= Lists of The New York Times number-one books =

This is a list of lists by year of The New York Times number-one books.

The New York Times Best Seller list was first published on October 12, 1931. It consisted of five fiction and four nonfiction for the New York City region only. The following month the list was expanded to eight cities, with a separate list for each city. By the early 1940s, fourteen cities were included. A national list was created August 9, 1942, in The New York Times Book Review (Sundays) as a supplement to the regular paper's city lists (Monday edition). The national list ranked by weighting how many times the book appeared in each city list. A few years later, the city lists were eliminated leaving only the national rankings, which was compiled according to "reports from leading booksellers in 22 cities," a system which remains essentially unchanged to this day (though the specifics have changed).

A separate category for "Advice, How-To and Miscellaneous" books was created January 1, 1984. Its number one bestseller (The Body Principal by Victoria Principal) had been number ten and number twelve on the nonfiction lists for the two preceding weeks.

== By year ==
(links are to lists of the New York Times fiction best sellers of each year)

- 1931
- 1932
- 1933
- 1934
- 1935
- 1936
- 1937
- 1938
- 1939
- 1940
- 1941
- 1942
- 1943
- 1944
- 1945
- 1946
- 1947
- 1948
- 1949
- 1950
- 1951
- 1952
- 1953
- 1954
- 1955
- 1956
- 1957
- 1958
- 1959
- 1960
- 1961
- 1962
- 1963
- 1964
- 1965
- 1966
- 1967
- 1968
- 1969
- 1970
- 1971
- 1972
- 1973
- 1974
- 1975
- 1976
- 1977
- 1978
- 1979
- 1980
- 1981
- 1982
- 1983
- 1984
- 1985
- 1986
- 1987
- 1988
- 1989
- 1990
- 1991
- 1992
- 1993
- 1994
- 1995
- 1996
- 1997
- 1998
- 1999
- 2000
- 2001
- 2002
- 2003
- 2004
- 2005
- 2006
- 2007
- 2008
- 2009
- 2010
- 2011
- 2012
- 2013
- 2014
- 2015
- 2016
- 2017
- 2018
- 2019
- 2020
- 2021
- 2022
- 2023
- 2024
- 2025
- 2026

== See also ==
- Books in the United States
- Publishers Weekly lists of bestselling novels in the United States
