= List of The New York Times number-one books of 1961 =

This is a list of books that topped The New York Times best-seller list in 1961.

== Fiction ==
The following list ranks the number-one best-selling fiction books.

The most popular titles of the year were Hawaii by James Michener, The Agony and the Ecstasy, by Irving Stone and Franny and Zooey by J. D. Salinger with respectively 12, 27 and 10 weeks at the top. Hawaii had previously dominated the 1960 list, and Franny and Zooey continued into 1962 at the top of the list for a total run of 26 weeks.

The only other book to top the list in 1961 was The Last of the Just by André Schwarz-Bart. That book, a multi-generational saga translated from the French, spent 18 weeks slowly rising to the top, and spent 4 weeks there before being toppled by The Agony and the Ecstasy. It continued among the top 15 best sellers for another 20 weeks.

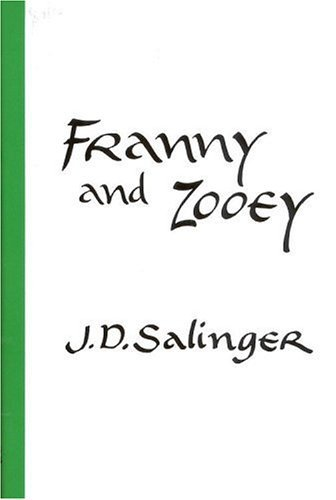
Franny and Zooey was a huge No. 1 bestseller for J.D. Salinger. His best known book, Catcher in the Rye, first published ten years earlier, never reached the No. 1 spot

Date	Book	Author
January 1	Hawaii	James Michener
January 8	Hawaii	James Michener
January 15	Hawaii	James Michener
January 22	Hawaii	James Michener
January 29	Hawaii	James Michener
February 5	Hawaii	James Michener
February 12	Hawaii	James Michener
February 19	Hawaii	James Michener
February 26	Hawaii	James Michener
March 5	Hawaii	James Michener
March 12	Hawaii	James Michener
March 19	Hawaii	James Michener
March 26	The Last of the Just	André Schwarz-Bart
April 2	The Last of the Just	André Schwarz-Bart
April 9	The Last of the Just	André Schwarz-Bart
April 16	The Last of the Just	André Schwarz-Bart
April 23	The Agony and the Ecstasy	Irving Stone
April 30	The Agony and the Ecstasy	Irving Stone
May 7	The Agony and the Ecstasy	Irving Stone
May 14	The Agony and the Ecstasy	Irving Stone
May 21	The Agony and the Ecstasy	Irving Stone
May 28	The Agony and the Ecstasy	Irving Stone
June 4	The Agony and the Ecstasy	Irving Stone
June 11	The Agony and the Ecstasy	Irving Stone
June 18	The Agony and the Ecstasy	Irving Stone
June 25	The Agony and the Ecstasy	Irving Stone
July 2	The Agony and the Ecstasy	Irving Stone
July 9	The Agony and the Ecstasy	Irving Stone
July 16	The Agony and the Ecstasy	Irving Stone
July 23	The Agony and the Ecstasy	Irving Stone
July 30	The Agony and the Ecstasy	Irving Stone
August 6	The Agony and the Ecstasy	Irving Stone
August 13	The Agony and the Ecstasy	Irving Stone
August 20	The Agony and the Ecstasy	Irving Stone
August 27	The Agony and the Ecstasy	Irving Stone
September 3	The Agony and the Ecstasy	Irving Stone
September 10	The Agony and the Ecstasy	Irving Stone
September 17	The Agony and the Ecstasy	Irving Stone
September 24	The Agony and the Ecstasy	Irving Stone
October 1	The Agony and the Ecstasy	Irving Stone
October 8	The Agony and the Ecstasy	Irving Stone
October 15	The Agony and the Ecstasy	Irving Stone
October 22	The Agony and the Ecstasy	Irving Stone
October 29	Franny and Zooey	J. D. Salinger
November 5	Franny and Zooey	J. D. Salinger
November 12	Franny and Zooey	J. D. Salinger
November 19	Franny and Zooey	J. D. Salinger
November 26	Franny and Zooey	J. D. Salinger
December 3	Franny and Zooey	J. D. Salinger
December 10	Franny and Zooey	J. D. Salinger
December 17	Franny and Zooey	J. D. Salinger
December 24	Franny and Zooey	J. D. Salinger
December 31	Franny and Zooey	J. D. Salinger

== Nonfiction ==
The following list ranks the number-one best-selling nonfiction books.

Date	Book	Author
January 1	The Rise and Fall of the Third Reich	William L. Shirer
January 8	The Rise and Fall of the Third Reich	William L. Shirer
January 15	The Rise and Fall of the Third Reich	William L. Shirer
January 22	The Rise and Fall of the Third Reich	William L. Shirer
January 29	The Rise and Fall of the Third Reich	William L. Shirer
February 5	The Rise and Fall of the Third Reich	William L. Shirer
February 12	The Rise and Fall of the Third Reich	William L. Shirer
February 19	The Rise and Fall of the Third Reich	William L. Shirer
February 26	The Rise and Fall of the Third Reich	William L. Shirer
March 5	The Rise and Fall of the Third Reich	William L. Shirer
March 12	The Rise and Fall of the Third Reich	William L. Shirer
March 19	The Rise and Fall of the Third Reich	William L. Shirer
March 26	The Rise and Fall of the Third Reich	William L. Shirer
April 2	The Rise and Fall of the Third Reich	William L. Shirer
April 9	The Rise and Fall of the Third Reich	William L. Shirer
April 16	The Rise and Fall of the Third Reich	William L. Shirer
April 23	The Rise and Fall of the Third Reich	William L. Shirer
April 30	The Rise and Fall of the Third Reich	William L. Shirer
May 7	The Rise and Fall of the Third Reich	William L. Shirer
May 14	The Rise and Fall of the Third Reich	William L. Shirer
May 21	The Rise and Fall of the Third Reich	William L. Shirer
May 28	The New English Bible: New Testament	
June 4	The Rise and Fall of the Third Reich	William L. Shirer
June 11	The Rise and Fall of the Third Reich	William L. Shirer
June 18	The Rise and Fall of the Third Reich	William L. Shirer
June 25	The Rise and Fall of the Third Reich	William L. Shirer
July 2	The Rise and Fall of the Third Reich	William L. Shirer
July 9	The Rise and Fall of the Third Reich	William L. Shirer
July 16	The Rise and Fall of the Third Reich	William L. Shirer
July 23	The Rise and Fall of the Third Reich	William L. Shirer
July 30	The Rise and Fall of the Third Reich	William L. Shirer
August 6	The Rise and Fall of the Third Reich	William L. Shirer
August 13	The Rise and Fall of the Third Reich	William L. Shirer
August 20	The Rise and Fall of the Third Reich	William L. Shirer
August 27	The Rise and Fall of the Third Reich	William L. Shirer
September 3	The Rise and Fall of the Third Reich	William L. Shirer
September 10	The Making of the President 1960	Theodore H. White
September 17	The Making of the President 1960	Theodore H. White
September 24	The Making of the President 1960	Theodore H. White
October 1	The Making of the President 1960	Theodore H. White
October 8	The Making of the President 1960	Theodore H. White
October 15	The Making of the President 1960	Theodore H. White
October 22	The Making of the President 1960	Theodore H. White
October 29	The Making of the President 1960	Theodore H. White
November 5	The Making of the President 1960	Theodore H. White
November 12	The Making of the President 1960	Theodore H. White
November 19	The Making of the President 1960	Theodore H. White
November 26	The Making of the President 1960	Theodore H. White
December 3	The Making of the President 1960	Theodore H. White
December 10	The Making of the President 1960	Theodore H. White
December 17	The Making of the President 1960	Theodore H. White
December 24	The Making of the President 1960	Theodore H. White
December 31	The Making of the President 1960	Theodore H. White

== See also ==
- Publishers Weekly list of bestselling novels in the United States in the 1960s
