= List of The New York Times number-one books of 1960 =

This is a list of books that topped The New York Times best-seller list in 1960.

== Fiction ==
The following list ranks the number-one best-selling fiction books.

Date	Book	Author
January 3	Advise and Consent	Allen Drury
January 10	Advise and Consent	Allen Drury
January 17	Hawaii	James Michener
January 24	Advise and Consent	Allen Drury
January 31	Hawaii	James Michener
February 7	Hawaii	James Michener
February 14	Hawaii	James Michener
February 21	Hawaii	James Michener
February 28	Hawaii	James Michener
March 6	Hawaii	James Michener
March 13	Hawaii	James Michener
March 20	Hawaii	James Michener
March 27	Hawaii	James Michener
April 3	Hawaii	James Michener
April 10	Hawaii	James Michener
April 17	Hawaii	James Michener
April 24	Hawaii	James Michener
May 1	Hawaii	James Michener
May 8	Hawaii	James Michener
May 15	Hawaii	James Michener
May 22	Advise and Consent	Allen Drury
May 29	Hawaii	James Michener
June 5	Advise and Consent	Allen Drury
June 12	Advise and Consent	Allen Drury
June 19	Advise and Consent	Allen Drury
June 26	Advise and Consent	Allen Drury
July 3	Advise and Consent	Allen Drury
July 10	Advise and Consent	Allen Drury
July 17	Hawaii	James Michener
July 24	Advise and Consent	Allen Drury
July 31	Advise and Consent	Allen Drury
August 7	Advise and Consent	Allen Drury
August 14	Advise and Consent	Allen Drury
August 21	Hawaii	James Michener
August 28	Hawaii	James Michener
September 4	Hawaii	James Michener
September 11	Hawaii	James Michener
September 18	Hawaii	James Michener
September 25	Hawaii	James Michener
October 2	Hawaii	James Michener
October 9	Hawaii	James Michener
October 16	Hawaii	James Michener
October 23	Hawaii	James Michener
October 30	Hawaii	James Michener
November 6	Hawaii	James Michener
November 13	Hawaii	James Michener
November 20	Hawaii	James Michener
November 27	Advise and Consent	Allen Drury
December 4	Hawaii	James Michener
December 11	Hawaii	James Michener
December 18	Hawaii	James Michener
December 25	Hawaii	James Michener

== Nonfiction ==
The following list ranks the number-one best-selling nonfiction books.

Date	Book	Author
January 3	Act One	Moss Hart
January 10	Act One	Moss Hart
January 17	Act One	Moss Hart
January 24	Act One	Moss Hart
January 31	Act One	Moss Hart
February 7	Act One	Moss Hart
February 14	Act One	Moss Hart
February 21	Act One	Moss Hart
February 28	Act One	Moss Hart
March 6	Act One	Moss Hart
March 13	May This House Be Safe From Tigers	Alexander King
March 20	May This House Be Safe From Tigers	Alexander King
March 27	May This House Be Safe From Tigers	Alexander King
April 3	May This House Be Safe From Tigers	Alexander King
April 10	May This House Be Safe From Tigers	Alexander King
April 17	May This House Be Safe From Tigers	Alexander King
April 24	May This House Be Safe From Tigers	Alexander King
May 1	May This House Be Safe From Tigers	Alexander King
May 8	May This House Be Safe From Tigers	Alexander King
May 15	May This House Be Safe From Tigers	Alexander King
May 22	May This House Be Safe From Tigers	Alexander King
May 29	May This House Be Safe From Tigers	Alexander King
June 5	May This House Be Safe From Tigers	Alexander King
June 12	May This House Be Safe From Tigers	Alexander King
June 19	May This House Be Safe From Tigers	Alexander King
June 26	May This House Be Safe From Tigers	Alexander King
July 3	May This House Be Safe From Tigers	Alexander King
July 10	May This House Be Safe From Tigers	Alexander King
July 17	May This House Be Safe From Tigers	Alexander King
July 24	May This House Be Safe From Tigers	Alexander King
July 31	May This House Be Safe From Tigers	Alexander King
August 7	Born Free	Joy Adamson
August 14	Born Free	Joy Adamson
August 21	Born Free	Joy Adamson
August 28	Born Free	Joy Adamson
September 4	Born Free	Joy Adamson
September 11	Born Free	Joy Adamson
September 18	Born Free	Joy Adamson
September 25	Born Free	Joy Adamson
October 2	Born Free	Joy Adamson
October 9	Born Free	Joy Adamson
October 16	Born Free	Joy Adamson
October 23	Born Free	Joy Adamson
October 30	Born Free	Joy Adamson
November 6	The Waste Makers	Vance Packard
November 13	The Waste Makers	Vance Packard
November 20	The Waste Makers	Vance Packard
November 27	The Waste Makers	Vance Packard
December 4	The Rise and Fall of the Third Reich	William L. Shirer
December 11	The Rise and Fall of the Third Reich	William L. Shirer
December 18	The Rise and Fall of the Third Reich	William L. Shirer
December 25	The Rise and Fall of the Third Reich	William L. Shirer

== See also ==
- Publishers Weekly list of bestselling novels in the United States in the 1960s
