= List of The New York Times number-one books of 1952 =

This is a list of books that topped The New York Times best-seller list in 1952.

== Fiction ==
The following list ranks the number-one best-selling fiction books.

Date	Book	Author
January 6	The Caine Mutiny	Herman Wouk
January 13	The Caine Mutiny	Herman Wouk
January 20	The Caine Mutiny	Herman Wouk
January 27	The Caine Mutiny	Herman Wouk
February 3	The Caine Mutiny	Herman Wouk
February 10	The Caine Mutiny	Herman Wouk
February 17	The Caine Mutiny	Herman Wouk
February 24	The Caine Mutiny	Herman Wouk
March 2	The Caine Mutiny	Herman Wouk
March 9	The Caine Mutiny	Herman Wouk
March 16	The Caine Mutiny	Herman Wouk
March 23	The Caine Mutiny	Herman Wouk
March 30	My Cousin Rachel	Daphne du Maurier
April 6	My Cousin Rachel	Daphne du Maurier
April 13	My Cousin Rachel	Daphne du Maurier
April 20	My Cousin Rachel	Daphne du Maurier
April 27	My Cousin Rachel	Daphne du Maurier
May 4	My Cousin Rachel	Daphne du Maurier
May 11	My Cousin Rachel	Daphne du Maurier
May 18	My Cousin Rachel	Daphne du Maurier
May 25	The Caine Mutiny	Herman Wouk
June 1	The Caine Mutiny	Herman Wouk
June 8	The Caine Mutiny	Herman Wouk
June 15	The Caine Mutiny	Herman Wouk
June 22	The Caine Mutiny	Herman Wouk
June 29	The Caine Mutiny	Herman Wouk
July 6	The Caine Mutiny	Herman Wouk
July 13	The Caine Mutiny	Herman Wouk
July 20	The Caine Mutiny	Herman Wouk
July 27	The Caine Mutiny	Herman Wouk
August 3	The Caine Mutiny	Herman Wouk
August 10	The Caine Mutiny	Herman Wouk
August 17	The Caine Mutiny	Herman Wouk
August 24	The Caine Mutiny	Herman Wouk
August 31	The Caine Mutiny	Herman Wouk
September 7	The Silver Chalice	Thomas B. Costain
September 14	The Silver Chalice	Thomas B. Costain
September 21	The Silver Chalice	Thomas B. Costain
September 28	The Silver Chalice	Thomas B. Costain
October 5	The Silver Chalice	Thomas B. Costain
October 12	The Silver Chalice	Thomas B. Costain
October 19	The Silver Chalice	Thomas B. Costain
October 26	The Silver Chalice	Thomas B. Costain
November 2	East of Eden	John Steinbeck
November 9	East of Eden	John Steinbeck
November 16	East of Eden	John Steinbeck
November 23	East of Eden	John Steinbeck
November 30	East of Eden	John Steinbeck
December 7	East of Eden	John Steinbeck
December 14	East of Eden	John Steinbeck
December 21	East of Eden	John Steinbeck
December 28	East of Eden	John Steinbeck

== Nonfiction ==
The following list ranks the number-one best-selling nonfiction books.

Date	Book	Author
January 6	The Sea Around Us	Rachel Carson
January 13	The Sea Around Us	Rachel Carson
January 20	The Sea Around Us	Rachel Carson
January 27	The Sea Around Us	Rachel Carson
February 3	The Sea Around Us	Rachel Carson
February 10	The Sea Around Us	Rachel Carson
February 17	The Sea Around Us	Rachel Carson
February 24	The Sea Around Us	Rachel Carson
March 2	The Sea Around Us	Rachel Carson
March 9	The Sea Around Us	Rachel Carson
March 16	The Sea Around Us	Rachel Carson
March 23	The Sea Around Us	Rachel Carson
March 30	The Sea Around Us	Rachel Carson
April 6	The Sea Around Us	Rachel Carson
April 13	The Sea Around Us	Rachel Carson
April 20	Mr. President	William Hillman
April 27	U.S.A. Confidential	Jack Lait and Lee Mortimer
May 4	The Sea Around Us	Rachel Carson
May 11	The Sea Around Us	Rachel Carson
May 18	The Sea Around Us	Rachel Carson
May 25	The Sea Around Us	Rachel Carson
June 1	The Sea Around Us	Rachel Carson
June 8	The Sea Around Us	Rachel Carson
June 15	The Sea Around Us	Rachel Carson
June 22	Witness	Whittaker Chambers
June 29	Witness	Whittaker Chambers
July 6	Witness	Whittaker Chambers
July 13	Witness	Whittaker Chambers
July 20	Witness	Whittaker Chambers
July 27	Witness	Whittaker Chambers
August 3	Witness	Whittaker Chambers
August 10	Witness	Whittaker Chambers
August 17	Witness	Whittaker Chambers
August 24	Witness	Whittaker Chambers
August 31	Witness	Whittaker Chambers
September 7	Witness	Whittaker Chambers
September 14	Witness	Whittaker Chambers
September 21	A Man Called Peter	Catherine Marshall
September 28	A Man Called Peter	Catherine Marshall
October 5	A Man Called Peter	Catherine Marshall
October 12	A Man Called Peter	Catherine Marshall
October 19	A Man Called Peter	Catherine Marshall
October 26	Tallulah: My Autobiography	Tallulah Bankhead
November 2	Tallulah: My Autobiography	Tallulah Bankhead
November 9	Tallulah: My Autobiography	Tallulah Bankhead
November 16	Tallulah: My Autobiography	Tallulah Bankhead
November 23	Tallulah: My Autobiography	Tallulah Bankhead
November 30	Tallulah: My Autobiography	Tallulah Bankhead
December 7	Tallulah: My Autobiography	Tallulah Bankhead
December 14	Tallulah: My Autobiography	Tallulah Bankhead
December 21	Tallulah: My Autobiography	Tallulah Bankhead
December 28	Tallulah: My Autobiography	Tallulah Bankhead

== See also ==
- Publishers Weekly list of bestselling novels in the United States in the 1950s
