= List of The New York Times number-one books of 1953 =

This is a list of books that topped The New York Times best-seller list in 1953.

== Fiction ==
The following list ranks the number-one best-selling fiction books.

Date	Book	Author
January 4	The Silver Chalice	Thomas B. Costain
January 11	East of Eden	John Steinbeck
January 18	The Silver Chalice	Thomas B. Costain
January 25	The Silver Chalice	Thomas B. Costain
February 1	East of Eden	John Steinbeck
February 8	The Silver Chalice	Thomas B. Costain
February 15	The Silver Chalice	Thomas B. Costain
February 22	The Silver Chalice	Thomas B. Costain
March 1	The Silver Chalice	Thomas B. Costain
March 8	Désirée	Annemarie Selinko
March 15	Désirée	Annemarie Selinko
March 22	Désirée	Annemarie Selinko
March 29	Désirée	Annemarie Selinko
April 5	Désirée	Annemarie Selinko
April 12	Désirée	Annemarie Selinko
April 19	Désirée	Annemarie Selinko
April 26	Désirée	Annemarie Selinko
May 3	Désirée	Annemarie Selinko
May 10	Désirée	Annemarie Selinko
May 17	Désirée	Annemarie Selinko
May 24	Désirée	Annemarie Selinko
May 31	Désirée	Annemarie Selinko
June 7	Désirée	Annemarie Selinko
June 14	Désirée	Annemarie Selinko
June 21	Désirée	Annemarie Selinko
June 28	Désirée	Annemarie Selinko
July 5	Désirée	Annemarie Selinko
July 12	Désirée	Annemarie Selinko
July 19	Désirée	Annemarie Selinko
July 26	Désirée	Annemarie Selinko
August 2	Désirée	Annemarie Selinko
August 9	Désirée	Annemarie Selinko
August 16	Désirée	Annemarie Selinko
August 23	Désirée	Annemarie Selinko
August 30	Désirée	Annemarie Selinko
September 6	Désirée	Annemarie Selinko
September 13	Désirée	Annemarie Selinko
September 20	Désirée	Annemarie Selinko
September 27	Désirée	Annemarie Selinko
October 4	Désirée	Annemarie Selinko
October 11	Beyond This Place	A.J. Cronin
October 18	Beyond This Place	A.J. Cronin
October 25	Désirée	Annemarie Selinko
November 1	Beyond This Place	A.J. Cronin
November 8	Beyond This Place	A.J. Cronin
November 15	Beyond This Place	A.J. Cronin
November 22	Beyond This Place	A.J. Cronin
November 29	Lord Vanity	Samuel Shellabarger
December 6	Lord Vanity	Samuel Shellabarger
December 13	Lord Vanity	Samuel Shellabarger
December 20	Lord Vanity	Samuel Shellabarger
December 27	Lord Vanity	Samuel Shellabarger

== Nonfiction ==
The following list ranks the number-one best-selling nonfiction books.

Date	Book	Author
January 4	Tallulah: My Autobiography	Tallulah Bankhead
January 11	Tallulah: My Autobiography	Tallulah Bankhead
January 18	Tallulah: My Autobiography	Tallulah Bankhead
January 25	Tallulah: My Autobiography	Tallulah Bankhead
February 1	Tallulah: My Autobiography	Tallulah Bankhead
February 8	Tallulah: My Autobiography	Tallulah Bankhead
February 15	Holy Bible: Revised Standard Version	
February 22	Annapurna	Maurice Herzog
March 1	Annapurna	Maurice Herzog
March 8	Annapurna	Maurice Herzog
March 15	Annapurna	Maurice Herzog
March 22	Annapurna	Maurice Herzog
March 29	Annapurna	Maurice Herzog
April 5	Annapurna	Maurice Herzog
April 12	Annapurna	Maurice Herzog
April 19	Annapurna	Maurice Herzog
April 26	Annapurna	Maurice Herzog
May 3	Annapurna	Maurice Herzog
May 10	Annapurna	Maurice Herzog
May 17	The Power of Positive Thinking	Norman Vincent Peale
May 24	The Power of Positive Thinking	Norman Vincent Peale
May 31	The Power of Positive Thinking	Norman Vincent Peale
June 7	The Power of Positive Thinking	Norman Vincent Peale
June 14	The Power of Positive Thinking	Norman Vincent Peale
June 21	The Power of Positive Thinking	Norman Vincent Peale
June 28	The Power of Positive Thinking	Norman Vincent Peale
July 5	The Power of Positive Thinking	Norman Vincent Peale
July 12	The Power of Positive Thinking	Norman Vincent Peale
July 19	The Power of Positive Thinking	Norman Vincent Peale
July 26	The Power of Positive Thinking	Norman Vincent Peale
August 2	The Power of Positive Thinking	Norman Vincent Peale
August 9	The Power of Positive Thinking	Norman Vincent Peale
August 16	The Power of Positive Thinking	Norman Vincent Peale
August 23	The Power of Positive Thinking	Norman Vincent Peale
August 30	The Power of Positive Thinking	Norman Vincent Peale
September 6	The Power of Positive Thinking	Norman Vincent Peale
September 13	The Power of Positive Thinking	Norman Vincent Peale
September 20	The Power of Positive Thinking	Norman Vincent Peale
September 27	The Power of Positive Thinking	Norman Vincent Peale
October 4	The Power of Positive Thinking	Norman Vincent Peale
October 11	The Power of Positive Thinking	Norman Vincent Peale
October 18	The Power of Positive Thinking	Norman Vincent Peale
October 25	The Power of Positive Thinking	Norman Vincent Peale
November 1	The Power of Positive Thinking	Norman Vincent Peale
November 8	The Power of Positive Thinking	Norman Vincent Peale
November 15	The Power of Positive Thinking	Norman Vincent Peale
November 22	The Power of Positive Thinking	Norman Vincent Peale
November 29	The Power of Positive Thinking	Norman Vincent Peale
December 6	The Power of Positive Thinking	Norman Vincent Peale
December 13	The Power of Positive Thinking	Norman Vincent Peale
December 20	The Power of Positive Thinking	Norman Vincent Peale
December 27	The Power of Positive Thinking	Norman Vincent Peale

== See also ==
- Publishers Weekly list of bestselling novels in the United States in the 1950s
