= List of The New York Times number-one books of 1968 =

This is a list of books that topped The New York Times best-seller list in 1968.

== Fiction ==
The following list ranks the number-one best-selling fiction books.

Date	Book	Author
January 7	The Confessions of Nat Turner	William Styron
January 14	The Confessions of Nat Turner	William Styron
January 21	The Confessions of Nat Turner	William Styron
January 28	The Confessions of Nat Turner	William Styron
February 4	The Confessions of Nat Turner	William Styron
February 11	The Confessions of Nat Turner	William Styron
February 18	The Confessions of Nat Turner	William Styron
February 25	The Confessions of Nat Turner	William Styron
March 3	The Confessions of Nat Turner	William Styron
March 10	The Confessions of Nat Turner	William Styron
March 17	The Confessions of Nat Turner	William Styron
March 24	The Confessions of Nat Turner	William Styron
March 31	Vanished	Fletcher Knebel
April 7	Airport	Arthur Hailey
April 14	Airport	Arthur Hailey
April 21	Airport	Arthur Hailey
April 28	Airport	Arthur Hailey
May 5	Airport	Arthur Hailey
May 12	Airport	Arthur Hailey
May 19	Airport	Arthur Hailey
May 26	Airport	Arthur Hailey
June 2	Airport	Arthur Hailey
June 9	Airport	Arthur Hailey
June 16	Airport	Arthur Hailey
June 23	Airport	Arthur Hailey
June 30	Couples	John Updike
July 7	Airport	Arthur Hailey
July 14	Airport	Arthur Hailey
July 21	Airport	Arthur Hailey
July 28	Airport	Arthur Hailey
August 4	Airport	Arthur Hailey
August 11	Airport	Arthur Hailey
August 18	Airport	Arthur Hailey
August 25	Airport	Arthur Hailey
September 1	Airport	Arthur Hailey
September 8	Airport	Arthur Hailey
September 15	Airport	Arthur Hailey
September 22	Airport	Arthur Hailey
September 29	Airport	Arthur Hailey
October 6	Airport	Arthur Hailey
October 13	Airport	Arthur Hailey
October 20	Airport	Arthur Hailey
October 27	Airport	Arthur Hailey
November 3	Airport	Arthur Hailey
November 10	The Salzburg Connection	Helen MacInnes
November 17	The Salzburg Connection	Helen MacInnes
November 24	The Salzburg Connection	Helen MacInnes
December 1	The Salzburg Connection	Helen MacInnes
December 8	The Salzburg Connection	Helen MacInnes
December 15	The Salzburg Connection	Helen MacInnes
December 22	The Salzburg Connection	Helen MacInnes
December 29	The Salzburg Connection	Helen MacInnes

== Nonfiction ==
The following list ranks the number-one best-selling nonfiction books.

Date	Book	Author
January 7	Rickenbacker: An Autobiography	Eddie Rickenbacker
January 14	Our Crowd	Stephen Birmingham
January 21	Our Crowd	Stephen Birmingham
January 28	Our Crowd	Stephen Birmingham
February 4	Our Crowd	Stephen Birmingham
February 11	Our Crowd	Stephen Birmingham
February 18	Our Crowd	Stephen Birmingham
February 25	Between Parent and Child	Haim G. Ginott
March 3	The Naked Ape	Desmond Morris
March 10	The Naked Ape	Desmond Morris
March 17	The Naked Ape	Desmond Morris
March 24	The Naked Ape	Desmond Morris
March 31	The Naked Ape	Desmond Morris
April 7	The Naked Ape	Desmond Morris
April 14	The Naked Ape	Desmond Morris
April 21	The Naked Ape	Desmond Morris
April 28	The Naked Ape	Desmond Morris
May 5	Between Parent and Child	Haim G. Ginott
May 12	Between Parent and Child	Haim G. Ginott
May 19	The Naked Ape	Desmond Morris
May 26	Between Parent and Child	Haim G. Ginott
June 2	The Naked Ape	Desmond Morris
June 9	Between Parent and Child	Haim G. Ginott
June 16	Between Parent and Child	Haim G. Ginott
June 23	Between Parent and Child	Haim G. Ginott
June 30	Between Parent and Child	Haim G. Ginott
July 7	The Money Game	"Adam Smith" (George Goodman)
July 14	The Money Game	"Adam Smith" (George Goodman)
July 21	The Money Game	"Adam Smith" (George Goodman)
July 28	The Money Game	"Adam Smith" (George Goodman)
August 4	The Money Game	"Adam Smith" (George Goodman)
August 11	The Money Game	"Adam Smith" (George Goodman)
August 18	The Money Game	"Adam Smith" (George Goodman)
August 25	The Money Game	"Adam Smith" (George Goodman)
September 1	The Money Game	"Adam Smith" (George Goodman)
September 8	The Money Game	"Adam Smith" (George Goodman)
September 15	The Money Game	"Adam Smith" (George Goodman)
September 22	The Money Game	"Adam Smith" (George Goodman)
September 29	The Money Game	"Adam Smith" (George Goodman)
October 6	The Money Game	"Adam Smith" (George Goodman)
October 13	The Money Game	"Adam Smith" (George Goodman)
October 20	The Money Game	"Adam Smith" (George Goodman)
October 27	The Money Game	"Adam Smith" (George Goodman)
November 3	The Money Game	"Adam Smith" (George Goodman)
November 10	The Money Game	"Adam Smith" (George Goodman)
November 17	The Money Game	"Adam Smith" (George Goodman)
November 24	The Money Game	"Adam Smith" (George Goodman)
December 1	The Money Game	"Adam Smith" (George Goodman)
December 8	The Money Game	"Adam Smith" (George Goodman)
December 15	Memoirs: Sixty Years on the Firing Line	Arthur Krock
December 22	The Money Game	"Adam Smith" (George Goodman)
December 29	The Money Game	"Adam Smith" (George Goodman)

== See also ==
- Publishers Weekly list of bestselling novels in the United States in the 1960s
