= List of The New York Times number-one books of 1947 =

This is a list of books that topped The New York Times best-seller list in 1947.

== Fiction ==
The following list ranks the number-one best-selling fiction books. Only six books topped the list that year. The most popular titles were Gentlemen's Agreement (14 weeks) and House Divided, which spent much of the last quarter of the year at the top of the list and a total of 15 weeks at the top overall. Two other novels, Lydia Bailey and The Moneymen each spent 12 weeks at the top. Sinclair Lewis had his only No. 1 bestseller that year (at least since the list went national in 1942).

Date	Book	Author
January 5	B.F.'s Daughter	John P. Marquand
January 12	B.F.'s Daughter	John P. Marquand
January 19	B.F.'s Daughter	John P. Marquand
January 26	B.F.'s Daughter	John P. Marquand
February 2	Lydia Bailey	Kenneth Roberts
February 9	Lydia Bailey	Kenneth Roberts
February 16	Lydia Bailey	Kenneth Roberts
February 23	Lydia Bailey	Kenneth Roberts
March 2	Lydia Bailey	Kenneth Roberts
March 9	Lydia Bailey	Kenneth Roberts
March 16	Lydia Bailey	Kenneth Roberts
March 23	Lydia Bailey	Kenneth Roberts
March 30	Lydia Bailey	Kenneth Roberts
April 6	Lydia Bailey	Kenneth Roberts
April 13	Lydia Bailey	Kenneth Roberts
April 20	Lydia Bailey	Kenneth Roberts
April 27	Gentlemen's Agreement	Laura Z. Hobson
May 4	Gentlemen's Agreement	Laura Z. Hobson
May 11	Gentlemen's Agreement	Laura Z. Hobson
May 18	Gentlemen's Agreement	Laura Z. Hobson
May 25	Gentlemen's Agreement	Laura Z. Hobson
June 1	Gentlemen's Agreement	Laura Z. Hobson
June 8	Gentlemen's Agreement	Laura Z. Hobson
June 15	Gentlemen's Agreement	Laura Z. Hobson
June 22	Gentlemen's Agreement	Laura Z. Hobson
June 29	Gentlemen's Agreement	Laura Z. Hobson
July 6	Kingsblood Royal	Sinclair Lewis
July 13	Kingsblood Royal	Sinclair Lewis
July 20	Gentlemen's Agreement	Laura Z. Hobson
July 27	Gentlemen's Agreement	Laura Z. Hobson
August 3	Gentlemen's Agreement	Laura Z. Hobson
August 10	Gentlemen's Agreement	Laura Z. Hobson
August 17	The Moneyman	Thomas B. Costain
August 24	The Moneyman	Thomas B. Costain
August 31	The Moneyman	Thomas B. Costain
September 7	The Moneyman	Thomas B. Costain
September 14	The Moneyman	Thomas B. Costain
September 21	The Moneyman	Thomas B. Costain
September 28	The Moneyman	Thomas B. Costain
October 5	The Moneyman	Thomas B. Costain
October 12	The Moneyman	Thomas B. Costain
October 19	The Moneyman	Thomas B. Costain
October 26	The Moneyman	Thomas B. Costain
November 2	The Moneyman	Thomas B. Costain
November 9	House Divided	Ben Ames Williams
November 16	House Divided	Ben Ames Williams
November 23	House Divided	Ben Ames Williams
November 30	House Divided	Ben Ames Williams
December 7	House Divided	Ben Ames Williams
December 14	House Divided	Ben Ames Williams
December 21	House Divided	Ben Ames Williams
December 28	House Divided	Ben Ames Williams

== Nonfiction ==
The following list ranks the number-one best-selling nonfiction books.

Date	Book	Author
January 5	Peace of Mind	Joshua L. Liebman
January 12	Peace of Mind	Joshua L. Liebman
January 19	Peace of Mind	Joshua L. Liebman
January 26	Peace of Mind	Joshua L. Liebman
February 2	Peace of Mind	Joshua L. Liebman
February 9	Peace of Mind	Joshua L. Liebman
February 16	Peace of Mind	Joshua L. Liebman
February 23	Peace of Mind	Joshua L. Liebman
March 2	Peace of Mind	Joshua L. Liebman
March 9	Peace of Mind	Joshua L. Liebman
March 16	Peace of Mind	Joshua L. Liebman
March 23	Peace of Mind	Joshua L. Liebman
March 30	Peace of Mind	Joshua L. Liebman
April 6	Peace of Mind	Joshua L. Liebman
April 13	Peace of Mind	Joshua L. Liebman
April 20	Peace of Mind	Joshua L. Liebman
April 27	Peace of Mind	Joshua L. Liebman
May 4	Peace of Mind	Joshua L. Liebman
May 11	Peace of Mind	Joshua L. Liebman
May 18	Peace of Mind	Joshua L. Liebman
May 25	Peace of Mind	Joshua L. Liebman
June 1	Peace of Mind	Joshua L. Liebman
June 8	Peace of Mind	Joshua L. Liebman
June 15	Peace of Mind	Joshua L. Liebman
June 22	Peace of Mind	Joshua L. Liebman
June 29	Inside U.S.A.	John Gunther
July 6	Inside U.S.A.	John Gunther
July 13	Inside U.S.A.	John Gunther
July 20	Inside U.S.A.	John Gunther
July 27	Inside U.S.A.	John Gunther
August 3	Inside U.S.A.	John Gunther
August 10	Inside U.S.A.	John Gunther
August 17	Inside U.S.A.	John Gunther
August 24	Inside U.S.A.	John Gunther
August 31	Inside U.S.A.	John Gunther
September 7	Inside U.S.A.	John Gunther
September 14	Inside U.S.A.	John Gunther
September 21	Inside U.S.A.	John Gunther
September 28	Inside U.S.A.	John Gunther
October 5	Inside U.S.A.	John Gunther
October 12	Inside U.S.A.	John Gunther
October 19	Inside U.S.A.	John Gunther
October 26	Inside U.S.A.	John Gunther
November 2	Inside U.S.A.	John Gunther
November 9	Inside U.S.A.	John Gunther
November 16	Speaking Frankly	James F. Byrnes
November 23	Speaking Frankly	James F. Byrnes
November 30	Speaking Frankly	James F. Byrnes
December 7	Speaking Frankly	James F. Byrnes
December 14	Speaking Frankly	James F. Byrnes
December 21	Speaking Frankly	James F. Byrnes
December 28	Speaking Frankly	James F. Byrnes

== See also ==
- Publishers Weekly list of bestselling novels in the United States in the 1940s
