= List of The New York Times number-one books of 1959 =

This is a list of books that topped The New York Times Best Seller list in 1959.

== Fiction ==
The following list ranks the number-one best-selling fiction books.

Date	Book	Author
January 4	Doctor Zhivago	Boris Pasternak
January 11	Doctor Zhivago	Boris Pasternak
January 18	Doctor Zhivago	Boris Pasternak
January 25	Doctor Zhivago	Boris Pasternak
February 1	Doctor Zhivago	Boris Pasternak
February 8	Doctor Zhivago	Boris Pasternak
February 15	Doctor Zhivago	Boris Pasternak
February 22	Doctor Zhivago	Boris Pasternak
March 1	Doctor Zhivago	Boris Pasternak
March 8	Doctor Zhivago	Boris Pasternak
March 15	Doctor Zhivago	Boris Pasternak
March 22	Doctor Zhivago	Boris Pasternak
March 29	Doctor Zhivago	Boris Pasternak
April 5	Doctor Zhivago	Boris Pasternak
April 12	Doctor Zhivago	Boris Pasternak
April 19	Doctor Zhivago	Boris Pasternak
April 26	Doctor Zhivago	Boris Pasternak
May 3	Doctor Zhivago	Boris Pasternak
May 10	Doctor Zhivago	Boris Pasternak
May 17	Exodus	Leon Uris
May 24	Exodus	Leon Uris
May 31	Exodus	Leon Uris
June 7	Exodus	Leon Uris
June 14	Exodus	Leon Uris
June 21	Exodus	Leon Uris
June 28	Exodus	Leon Uris
July 5	Exodus	Leon Uris
July 12	Exodus	Leon Uris
July 19	Exodus	Leon Uris
July 26	Exodus	Leon Uris
August 2	Exodus	Leon Uris
August 9	Exodus	Leon Uris
August 16	Exodus	Leon Uris
August 23	Exodus	Leon Uris
August 30	Exodus	Leon Uris
September 6	Exodus	Leon Uris
September 13	Exodus	Leon Uris
September 20	Exodus	Leon Uris
September 27	Exodus	Leon Uris
October 4	Advise and Consent	Allen Drury
October 11	Advise and Consent	Allen Drury
October 18	Advise and Consent	Allen Drury
October 25	Advise and Consent	Allen Drury
November 1	Advise and Consent	Allen Drury
November 8	Advise and Consent	Allen Drury
November 15	Advise and Consent	Allen Drury
November 22	Advise and Consent	Allen Drury
November 29	Advise and Consent	Allen Drury
December 6	Advise and Consent	Allen Drury
December 13	Advise and Consent	Allen Drury
December 20	Advise and Consent	Allen Drury
December 27	Advise and Consent	Allen Drury

== Nonfiction ==
The following list ranks the number-one best-selling nonfiction books.

Date	Book	Author
January 4	Only in America	Harry Golden
January 11	Only in America	Harry Golden
January 18	Only in America	Harry Golden
January 25	Only in America	Harry Golden
February 1	Only in America	Harry Golden
February 8	Only in America	Harry Golden
February 15	Only in America	Harry Golden
February 22	Only in America	Harry Golden
March 1	Only in America	Harry Golden
March 8	Only in America	Harry Golden
March 15	Only in America	Harry Golden
March 22	Only in America	Harry Golden
March 29	Only in America	Harry Golden
April 5	Only in America	Harry Golden
April 12	Mine Enemy Grows Older	Alexander King
April 19	Mine Enemy Grows Older	Alexander King
April 26	Mine Enemy Grows Older	Alexander King
May 3	Mine Enemy Grows Older	Alexander King
May 10	Mine Enemy Grows Older	Alexander King
May 17	Mine Enemy Grows Older	Alexander King
May 24	Mine Enemy Grows Older	Alexander King
May 31	Mine Enemy Grows Older	Alexander King
June 7	Mine Enemy Grows Older	Alexander King
June 14	The Status Seekers	Vance Packard
June 21	The Status Seekers	Vance Packard
June 28	The Status Seekers	Vance Packard
July 5	The Status Seekers	Vance Packard
July 12	The Status Seekers	Vance Packard
July 19	The Status Seekers	Vance Packard
July 26	The Status Seekers	Vance Packard
August 2	The Status Seekers	Vance Packard
August 9	The Status Seekers	Vance Packard
August 16	The Status Seekers	Vance Packard
August 23	The Status Seekers	Vance Packard
August 30	The Status Seekers	Vance Packard
September 6	The Status Seekers	Vance Packard
September 13	For 2¢ Plain	Harry Golden
September 20	The Status Seekers	Vance Packard
September 27	The Status Seekers	Vance Packard
October 4	The Status Seekers	Vance Packard
October 11	For 2¢ Plain	Harry Golden
October 18	For 2¢ Plain	Harry Golden
October 25	The Status Seekers	Vance Packard
November 1	Act One	Moss Hart
November 8	Act One	Moss Hart
November 15	Act One	Moss Hart
November 22	Act One	Moss Hart
November 29	Act One	Moss Hart
December 6	Act One	Moss Hart
December 13	Act One	Moss Hart
December 20	Act One	Moss Hart
December 27	Act One	Moss Hart

== See also ==
- Publishers Weekly list of bestselling novels in the United States in the 1950s
