= List of The New York Times number-one books of 1958 =

This is a list of books that topped The New York Times Best Seller list in 1958.

== Fiction ==
The following list ranks the number-one best-selling fiction books.

Date	Book	Author
January 5	By Love Possessed	James Gould Cozzens
January 12	By Love Possessed	James Gould Cozzens
January 19	By Love Possessed	James Gould Cozzens
January 26	By Love Possessed	James Gould Cozzens
February 2	By Love Possessed	James Gould Cozzens
February 9	By Love Possessed	James Gould Cozzens
February 16	By Love Possessed	James Gould Cozzens
February 23	By Love Possessed	James Gould Cozzens
March 2	By Love Possessed	James Gould Cozzens
March 9	Anatomy of a Murder	Robert Traver
March 16	Anatomy of a Murder	Robert Traver
March 23	Anatomy of a Murder	Robert Traver
March 30	Anatomy of a Murder	Robert Traver
April 6	Anatomy of a Murder	Robert Traver
April 13	Anatomy of a Murder	Robert Traver
April 20	Anatomy of a Murder	Robert Traver
April 27	Anatomy of a Murder	Robert Traver
May 4	Anatomy of a Murder	Robert Traver
May 11	Anatomy of a Murder	Robert Traver
May 18	Anatomy of a Murder	Robert Traver
May 25	Anatomy of a Murder	Robert Traver
June 1	Anatomy of a Murder	Robert Traver
June 8	Anatomy of a Murder	Robert Traver
June 15	Anatomy of a Murder	Robert Traver
June 22	Anatomy of a Murder	Robert Traver
June 29	Anatomy of a Murder	Robert Traver
July 6	Anatomy of a Murder	Robert Traver
July 13	Anatomy of a Murder	Robert Traver
July 20	Anatomy of a Murder	Robert Traver
July 27	Anatomy of a Murder	Robert Traver
August 3	Anatomy of a Murder	Robert Traver
August 10	Anatomy of a Murder	Robert Traver
August 17	Anatomy of a Murder	Robert Traver
August 24	Anatomy of a Murder	Robert Traver
August 31	Anatomy of a Murder	Robert Traver
September 7	Anatomy of a Murder	Robert Traver
September 14	Anatomy of a Murder	Robert Traver
September 21	Anatomy of a Murder	Robert Traver
September 28	Lolita	Vladimir Nabokov
October 5	Lolita	Vladimir Nabokov
October 12	Lolita	Vladimir Nabokov
October 19	Lolita	Vladimir Nabokov
October 26	Lolita	Vladimir Nabokov
November 2	Lolita	Vladimir Nabokov
November 9	Lolita	Vladimir Nabokov
November 16	Doctor Zhivago	Boris Pasternak
November 23	Doctor Zhivago	Boris Pasternak
November 30	Doctor Zhivago	Boris Pasternak
December 7	Doctor Zhivago	Boris Pasternak
December 14	Doctor Zhivago	Boris Pasternak
December 21	Not published due to a newspaper strike	
December 28	Not published due to a newspaper strike	

== Nonfiction ==
The following list ranks the number-one best-selling nonfiction books.

Date	Book	Author
January 5	Baruch: My Own Story	Bernard Baruch
January 12	Baruch: My Own Story	Bernard Baruch
January 19	Baruch: My Own Story	Bernard Baruch
January 26	Baruch: My Own Story	Bernard Baruch
February 2	Please Don't Eat the Daisies	Jean Kerr
February 9	Please Don't Eat the Daisies	Jean Kerr
February 16	Please Don't Eat the Daisies	Jean Kerr
February 23	Please Don't Eat the Daisies	Jean Kerr
March 2	Please Don't Eat the Daisies	Jean Kerr
March 9	Please Don't Eat the Daisies	Jean Kerr
March 16	Please Don't Eat the Daisies	Jean Kerr
March 23	Please Don't Eat the Daisies	Jean Kerr
March 30	Please Don't Eat the Daisies	Jean Kerr
April 6	Please Don't Eat the Daisies	Jean Kerr
April 13	Please Don't Eat the Daisies	Jean Kerr
April 20	Please Don't Eat the Daisies	Jean Kerr
April 27	Please Don't Eat the Daisies	Jean Kerr
May 4	Masters of Deceit	J. Edgar Hoover
May 11	Masters of Deceit	J. Edgar Hoover
May 18	Masters of Deceit	J. Edgar Hoover
May 25	Masters of Deceit	J. Edgar Hoover
June 1	Masters of Deceit	J. Edgar Hoover
June 8	Masters of Deceit	J. Edgar Hoover
June 15	Masters of Deceit	J. Edgar Hoover
June 22	Masters of Deceit	J. Edgar Hoover
June 29	Masters of Deceit	J. Edgar Hoover
July 6	Inside Russia Today	John Gunther
July 13	Inside Russia Today	John Gunther
July 20	Inside Russia Today	John Gunther
July 27	Inside Russia Today	John Gunther
August 3	Inside Russia Today	John Gunther
August 10	Inside Russia Today	John Gunther
August 17	Inside Russia Today	John Gunther
August 24	Inside Russia Today	John Gunther
August 31	Inside Russia Today	John Gunther
September 7	Inside Russia Today	John Gunther
September 14	Inside Russia Today	John Gunther
September 21	Only in America	Harry Lewis Golden
September 28	Only in America	Harry Lewis Golden
October 5	Only in America	Harry Lewis Golden
October 12	Only in America	Harry Lewis Golden
October 19	Aku-Aku	Thor Heyerdahl
October 26	Aku-Aku	Thor Heyerdahl
November 2	Only in America	Harry Lewis Golden
November 9	Only in America	Harry Lewis Golden
November 16	Only in America	Harry Lewis Golden
November 23	Only in America	Harry Lewis Golden
November 30	Only in America	Harry Lewis Golden
December 7	Only in America	Harry Lewis Golden
December 14	Only in America	Harry Lewis Golden
December 21	Not published due to a newspaper strike	
December 28	Not published due to a newspaper strike	

== See also ==
- Publishers Weekly list of bestselling novels in the United States in the 1950s
