= List of The New York Times number-one books of 1949 =

This is a list of books that topped The New York Times best-seller list in 1949.

== Fiction ==
The following list ranks the number-one best-selling fiction books.

Only five novels topped the list that year, which was dominated by John P. Marquand's Point of No Return which spent 22 straight weeks at the top of the list though it only lasted 34 weeks in the top 15 overall. Marquand's book is notable for its lampooning of W. Lloyd Warner, an anthropologist with whom Marquand had a personal grudge. Point of No Return was toppled by Marguerite Steen's Twilight on the Floods and then by John O'Hara's A Rage To Live, which spent 6 weeks at the top. That book stayed in the top five for another 20 weeks but the remainder of the year was dominated by The Egyptian by the Finnish author Mika Waltari. The Egyptian was translated from a Swedish translation by Naomi Walford.

Date	Book	Author
January 2	The Big Fisherman	Lloyd Douglas
January 9	The Big Fisherman	Lloyd Douglas
January 16	The Big Fisherman	Lloyd Douglas
January 23	The Big Fisherman	Lloyd Douglas
January 30	The Big Fisherman	Lloyd Douglas
February 6	The Big Fisherman	Lloyd Douglas
February 13	The Big Fisherman	Lloyd Douglas
February 20	The Big Fisherman	Lloyd Douglas
February 27	The Big Fisherman	Lloyd Douglas
March 6	The Big Fisherman	Lloyd Douglas
March 13	The Big Fisherman	Lloyd Douglas
March 20	The Big Fisherman	Lloyd Douglas
March 27	The Big Fisherman	Lloyd Douglas
April 3	The Big Fisherman	Lloyd Douglas
April 10	Point of No Return	John P. Marquand
April 17	Point of No Return	John P. Marquand
April 24	Point of No Return	John P. Marquand
May 1	Point of No Return	John P. Marquand
May 8	Point of No Return	John P. Marquand
May 15	Point of No Return	John P. Marquand
May 22	Point of No Return	John P. Marquand
May 29	Point of No Return	John P. Marquand
June 5	Point of No Return	John P. Marquand
June 12	Point of No Return	John P. Marquand
June 19	Point of No Return	John P. Marquand
June 26	Point of No Return	John P. Marquand
July 3	Point of No Return	John P. Marquand
July 10	Point of No Return	John P. Marquand
July 17	Point of No Return	John P. Marquand
July 24	Point of No Return	John P. Marquand
July 31	Point of No Return	John P. Marquand
August 7	Point of No Return	John P. Marquand
August 14	Point of No Return	John P. Marquand
August 21	Point of No Return	John P. Marquand
August 28	Point of No Return	John P. Marquand
September 4	Point of No Return	John P. Marquand
September 11	Twilight on the Floods	Marguerite Steen
September 18	A Rage To Live	John O'Hara
September 25	A Rage To Live	John O'Hara
October 2	A Rage To Live	John O'Hara
October 9	A Rage To Live	John O'Hara
October 16	A Rage To Live	John O'Hara
October 23	A Rage To Live	John O'Hara
October 30	The Egyptian	Mika Waltari
November 6	The Egyptian	Mika Waltari
November 13	The Egyptian	Mika Waltari
November 20	The Egyptian	Mika Waltari
November 27	The Egyptian	Mika Waltari
December 4	The Egyptian	Mika Waltari
December 11	The Egyptian	Mika Waltari
December 18	The Egyptian	Mika Waltari
December 26	The Egyptian	Mika Waltari

== Nonfiction ==
The following list ranks the number-one best-selling nonfiction books.

Date	Book	Author
January 2	Crusade in Europe	Dwight D. Eisenhower
January 9	Crusade in Europe	Dwight D. Eisenhower
January 16	Crusade in Europe	Dwight D. Eisenhower
January 23	Crusade in Europe	Dwight D. Eisenhower
January 30	Crusade in Europe	Dwight D. Eisenhower
February 6	Crusade in Europe	Dwight D. Eisenhower
February 13	Crusade in Europe	Dwight D. Eisenhower
February 20	Crusade in Europe	Dwight D. Eisenhower
February 27	Crusade in Europe	Dwight D. Eisenhower
March 6	Crusade in Europe	Dwight D. Eisenhower
March 13	Cheaper by the Dozen	Frank B. Gilbreth Jr. and Ernestine Gilbreth Carey
March 20	Cheaper by the Dozen	Frank B. Gilbreth Jr. and Ernestine Gilbreth Carey
March 27	Cheaper by the Dozen	Frank B. Gilbreth Jr. and Ernestine Gilbreth Carey
April 3	Cheaper by the Dozen	Frank B. Gilbreth Jr. and Ernestine Gilbreth Carey
April 10	Cheaper by the Dozen	Frank B. Gilbreth Jr. and Ernestine Gilbreth Carey
April 17	Cheaper by the Dozen	Frank B. Gilbreth Jr. and Ernestine Gilbreth Carey
April 24	Cheaper by the Dozen	Frank B. Gilbreth Jr. and Ernestine Gilbreth Carey
May 1	The Greatest Story Ever Told	Fulton Oursler
May 8	The Greatest Story Ever Told	Fulton Oursler
May 15	The Greatest Story Ever Told	Fulton Oursler
May 22	Cheaper by the Dozen	Frank B. Gilbreth Jr. and Ernestine Gilbreth Carey
May 29	Cheaper by the Dozen	Frank B. Gilbreth Jr. and Ernestine Gilbreth Carey
June 5	Cheaper by the Dozen	Frank B. Gilbreth Jr. and Ernestine Gilbreth Carey
June 12	Cheaper by the Dozen	Frank B. Gilbreth Jr. and Ernestine Gilbreth Carey
June 19	Cheaper by the Dozen	Frank B. Gilbreth Jr. and Ernestine Gilbreth Carey
June 26	Cheaper by the Dozen	Frank B. Gilbreth Jr. and Ernestine Gilbreth Carey
July 3	Cheaper by the Dozen	Frank B. Gilbreth Jr. and Ernestine Gilbreth Carey
July 10	Cheaper by the Dozen	Frank B. Gilbreth Jr. and Ernestine Gilbreth Carey
July 17	Cheaper by the Dozen	Frank B. Gilbreth Jr. and Ernestine Gilbreth Carey
July 24	Cheaper by the Dozen	Frank B. Gilbreth Jr. and Ernestine Gilbreth Carey
July 31	Cheaper by the Dozen	Frank B. Gilbreth Jr. and Ernestine Gilbreth Carey
August 7	Cheaper by the Dozen	Frank B. Gilbreth Jr. and Ernestine Gilbreth Carey
August 14	Cheaper by the Dozen	Frank B. Gilbreth Jr. and Ernestine Gilbreth Carey
August 21	Cheaper by the Dozen	Frank B. Gilbreth Jr. and Ernestine Gilbreth Carey
August 28	Cheaper by the Dozen	Frank B. Gilbreth Jr. and Ernestine Gilbreth Carey
September 4	White Collar Zoo	Clare Barnes Jr.
September 11	White Collar Zoo	Clare Barnes Jr.
September 18	White Collar Zoo	Clare Barnes Jr.
September 25	White Collar Zoo	Clare Barnes Jr.
October 2	White Collar Zoo	Clare Barnes Jr.
October 9	White Collar Zoo	Clare Barnes Jr.
October 16	White Collar Zoo	Clare Barnes Jr.
October 23	White Collar Zoo	Clare Barnes Jr.
October 30	White Collar Zoo	Clare Barnes Jr.
November 6	White Collar Zoo	Clare Barnes Jr.
November 13	White Collar Zoo	Clare Barnes Jr.
November 20	White Collar Zoo	Clare Barnes Jr.
November 27	White Collar Zoo	Clare Barnes Jr.
December 4	White Collar Zoo	Clare Barnes Jr.
December 11	White Collar Zoo	Clare Barnes Jr.
December 18	White Collar Zoo	Clare Barnes Jr.
December 26	White Collar Zoo	Clare Barnes Jr.

== See also ==
- Publishers Weekly list of bestselling novels in the United States in the 1940s
