= List of The New York Times number-one books of 1963 =

This is a list of books that topped The New York Times best-seller list in 1963.

The list is notable for being blank for the first three months as The New York Times, like many other newspapers in the city, worked its way through a major newspaper strike.

== Fiction ==
The following list ranks the number-one best-selling fiction books.

When the strike ended in April, J.D. Salinger's second No. 1 bestseller in 18 months, the anthologized novellas, "Raise High the Roof Beam, Carpenters" and "Seymour: An Introduction" led the list.

Salinger's book led the list for six weeks through the spring of 1963. Daphne du Maurier's The Glass-Blowers then spent six weeks on the list, followed by Morris West's novel about the Vatican, The Shoes of the Fisherman (14 weeks). On October 6, Shoes gave way to Mary McCarthy's semi-autobiographical novel The Group, which would spend the next 20 weeks at the top, closing out the year.

Date	Book	Author
January 6	Not published due to a newspaper strike	
January 13	Not published due to a newspaper strike	
January 20	Not published due to a newspaper strike	
January 27	Not published due to a newspaper strike	
February 3	Not published due to a newspaper strike	
February 10	Not published due to a newspaper strike	
February 17	Not published due to a newspaper strike	
February 24	Not published due to a newspaper strike	
March 3	Not published due to a newspaper strike	
March 10	Not published due to a newspaper strike	
March 17	Not published due to a newspaper strike	
March 24	Not published due to a newspaper strike	
March 31	Not published due to a newspaper strike	
April 7	Raise High the Roof Beam, Carpenters	J. D. Salinger
April 14	Raise High the Roof Beam, Carpenters	J. D. Salinger
April 21	Raise High the Roof Beam, Carpenters	J. D. Salinger
April 28	Raise High the Roof Beam, Carpenters	J. D. Salinger
May 5	Raise High the Roof Beam, Carpenters	J. D. Salinger
May 12	Raise High the Roof Beam, Carpenters	J. D. Salinger
May 19	The Glass-Blowers	Daphne du Maurier
May 26	The Glass-Blowers	Daphne du Maurier
June 2	The Glass-Blowers	Daphne du Maurier
June 9	The Glass-Blowers	Daphne du Maurier
June 16	The Glass-Blowers	Daphne du Maurier
June 23	The Glass-Blowers	Daphne du Maurier
June 30	The Shoes of the Fisherman	Morris West
July 7	The Shoes of the Fisherman	Morris West
July 14	The Shoes of the Fisherman	Morris West
July 21	The Shoes of the Fisherman	Morris West
July 28	The Shoes of the Fisherman	Morris West
August 4	The Shoes of the Fisherman	Morris West
August 11	The Shoes of the Fisherman	Morris West
August 18	The Shoes of the Fisherman	Morris West
August 25	The Shoes of the Fisherman	Morris West
September 1	The Shoes of the Fisherman	Morris West
September 8	The Shoes of the Fisherman	Morris West
September 15	The Shoes of the Fisherman	Morris West
September 22	The Shoes of the Fisherman	Morris West
September 29	The Shoes of the Fisherman	Morris West
October 6	The Group	Mary McCarthy
October 13	The Group	Mary McCarthy
October 20	The Group	Mary McCarthy
October 27	The Group	Mary McCarthy
November 3	The Group	Mary McCarthy
November 10	The Group	Mary McCarthy
November 17	The Group	Mary McCarthy
November 24	The Group	Mary McCarthy
December 1	The Group	Mary McCarthy
December 8	The Group	Mary McCarthy
December 15	The Group	Mary McCarthy
December 22	The Group	Mary McCarthy
December 29	The Group	Mary McCarthy

== Nonfiction ==
The following list ranks the number-one best-selling nonfiction books.

Date	Book	Author
January 6	Not published due to a newspaper strike	
January 13	Not published due to a newspaper strike	
January 20	Not published due to a newspaper strike	
January 27	Not published due to a newspaper strike	
February 3	Not published due to a newspaper strike	
February 10	Not published due to a newspaper strike	
February 17	Not published due to a newspaper strike	
February 24	Not published due to a newspaper strike	
March 3	Not published due to a newspaper strike	
March 10	Not published due to a newspaper strike	
March 17	Not published due to a newspaper strike	
March 24	Not published due to a newspaper strike	
March 31	Not published due to a newspaper strike	
April 7	Travels With Charley	John Steinbeck
April 14	Travels With Charley	John Steinbeck
April 21	Travels With Charley	John Steinbeck
April 28	Travels With Charley	John Steinbeck
May 5	Travels With Charley	John Steinbeck
May 12	Travels With Charley	John Steinbeck
May 19	The Whole Truth and Nothing But	Hedda Hopper with James Brough
May 26	The Whole Truth and Nothing But	Hedda Hopper with James Brough
June 2	The Whole Truth and Nothing But	Hedda Hopper with James Brough
June 9	The Whole Truth and Nothing But	Hedda Hopper with James Brough
June 16	The Whole Truth and Nothing But	Hedda Hopper with James Brough
June 23	The Whole Truth and Nothing But	Hedda Hopper with James Brough
June 30	The Whole Truth and Nothing But	Hedda Hopper with James Brough
July 7	The Fire Next Time	James Baldwin
July 14	The Fire Next Time	James Baldwin
July 21	I Owe Russia $1200	Bob Hope
July 28	The Fire Next Time	James Baldwin
August 4	The Fire Next Time	James Baldwin
August 11	The Fire Next Time	James Baldwin
August 18	The Fire Next Time	James Baldwin
August 25	The Fire Next Time	James Baldwin
September 1	The Fire Next Time	James Baldwin
September 8	The Fire Next Time	James Baldwin
September 15	The Fire Next Time	James Baldwin
September 22	The Fire Next Time	James Baldwin
September 29	The Fire Next Time	James Baldwin
October 6	J.F.K.: The Man and the Myth	Victor Lasky
October 13	J.F.K.: The Man and the Myth	Victor Lasky
October 20	J.F.K.: The Man and the Myth	Victor Lasky
October 27	J.F.K.: The Man and the Myth	Victor Lasky
November 3	J.F.K.: The Man and the Myth	Victor Lasky
November 10	J.F.K.: The Man and the Myth	Victor Lasky
November 17	J.F.K.: The Man and the Myth	Victor Lasky
November 24	J.F.K.: The Man and the Myth	Victor Lasky
December 1	J.F.K.: The Man and the Myth	Victor Lasky
December 8	The American Way of Death	Jessica Mitford
December 15	The American Way of Death	Jessica Mitford
December 22	The American Way of Death	Jessica Mitford
December 29	Profiles in Courage	John F. Kennedy

== See also ==
- Publishers Weekly list of bestselling novels in the United States in the 1960s
