= List of The New York Times number-one books of 1976 =

This is a list of books that topped The New York Times Best Seller list in 1976.

== Fiction ==
The following list ranks the number-one best-selling fiction books.

| Date | Book | Author |
|---|---|---|
| January 4 | Curtain | Agatha Christie |
| January 11 | Curtain | Agatha Christie |
| January 18 | Curtain | Agatha Christie |
| January 25 | Curtain | Agatha Christie |
| February 1 | Curtain | Agatha Christie |
| February 8 | Curtain | Agatha Christie |
| February 15 | Curtain | Agatha Christie |
| February 22 | Curtain | Agatha Christie |
| February 29 | Curtain | Agatha Christie |
| March 7 | Curtain | Agatha Christie |
| March 14 | Curtain | Agatha Christie |
| March 21 | Curtain | Agatha Christie |
| March 28 | Curtain | Agatha Christie |
| April 4 | Curtain | Agatha Christie |
| April 11 | 1876 | Gore Vidal |
| April 18 | 1876 | Gore Vidal |
| April 25 | 1876 | Gore Vidal |
| May 2 | 1876 | Gore Vidal |
| May 9 | 1876 | Gore Vidal |
| May 16 | 1876 | Gore Vidal |
| May 23 | 1876 | Gore Vidal |
| May 30 | 1876 | Gore Vidal |
| June 6 | 1876 | Gore Vidal |
| June 13 | Trinity | Leon Uris |
| June 20 | Trinity | Leon Uris |
| June 27 | Trinity | Leon Uris |
| July 4 | Trinity | Leon Uris |
| July 11 | Trinity | Leon Uris |
| July 18 | Trinity | Leon Uris |
| July 25 | Trinity | Leon Uris |
| August 1 | Trinity | Leon Uris |
| August 8 | Trinity | Leon Uris |
| August 15 | Trinity | Leon Uris |
| August 22 | Trinity | Leon Uris |
| August 29 | Trinity | Leon Uris |
| September 5 | Trinity | Leon Uris |
| September 12 | Trinity | Leon Uris |
| September 19 | Trinity | Leon Uris |
| September 26 | Trinity | Leon Uris |
| October 3 | Trinity | Leon Uris |
| October 10 | Trinity | Leon Uris |
| October 17 | Trinity | Leon Uris |
| October 24 | Trinity | Leon Uris |
| October 31 | Trinity | Leon Uris |
| November 7 | Sleeping Murder | Agatha Christie |
| November 14 | Sleeping Murder | Agatha Christie |
| November 21 | Sleeping Murder | Agatha Christie |
| November 28 | Sleeping Murder | Agatha Christie |
| December 5 | Sleeping Murder | Agatha Christie |
| December 12 | Sleeping Murder | Agatha Christie |
| December 19 | Sleeping Murder | Agatha Christie |
| December 26 | Trinity | Leon Uris |

== Nonfiction ==
The following list ranks the number-one best-selling nonfiction books.

| Date | Book | Author |
|---|---|---|
| January 4 | Bring on the Empty Horses | David Niven |
| January 11 | Bring on the Empty Horses | David Niven |
| January 18 | Bring on the Empty Horses | David Niven |
| January 25 | Bring on the Empty Horses | David Niven |
| February 1 | Bring on the Empty Horses | David Niven |
| February 8 | Bring on the Empty Horses | David Niven |
| February 15 | Bring on the Empty Horses | David Niven |
| February 22 | Bring on the Empty Horses | David Niven |
| February 29 | Bring on the Empty Horses | David Niven |
| March 7 | Winning Through Intimidation | Robert J. Ringer |
| March 14 | Doris Day: Her Own Story | A. E. Hotchner |
| March 21 | Doris Day: Her Own Story | A. E. Hotchner |
| March 28 | Doris Day: Her Own Story | A. E. Hotchner |
| April 4 | Doris Day: Her Own Story | A. E. Hotchner |
| April 11 | Doris Day: Her Own Story | A. E. Hotchner |
| April 18 | World of Our Fathers | Irving Howe with Kenneth Libo |
| April 25 | The Final Days | Bob Woodward and Carl Bernstein |
| May 2 | The Final Days | Bob Woodward and Carl Bernstein |
| May 9 | The Final Days | Bob Woodward and Carl Bernstein |
| May 16 | The Final Days | Bob Woodward and Carl Bernstein |
| May 23 | The Final Days | Bob Woodward and Carl Bernstein |
| May 30 | The Final Days | Bob Woodward and Carl Bernstein |
| June 6 | The Final Days | Bob Woodward and Carl Bernstein |
| June 13 | The Final Days | Bob Woodward and Carl Bernstein |
| June 20 | The Final Days | Bob Woodward and Carl Bernstein |
| June 27 | The Final Days | Bob Woodward and Carl Bernstein |
| July 4 | The Final Days | Bob Woodward and Carl Bernstein |
| July 11 | The Final Days | Bob Woodward and Carl Bernstein |
| July 18 | The Final Days | Bob Woodward and Carl Bernstein |
| July 25 | The Final Days | Bob Woodward and Carl Bernstein |
| August 1 | The Final Days | Bob Woodward and Carl Bernstein |
| August 8 | The Final Days | Bob Woodward and Carl Bernstein |
| August 15 | The Final Days | Bob Woodward and Carl Bernstein |
| August 22 | The Final Days | Bob Woodward and Carl Bernstein |
| August 29 | Passages | Gail Sheehy |
| September 5 | Passages | Gail Sheehy |
| September 12 | Passages | Gail Sheehy |
| September 19 | Passages | Gail Sheehy |
| September 26 | Passages | Gail Sheehy |
| October 3 | Passages | Gail Sheehy |
| October 10 | Passages | Gail Sheehy |
| October 17 | Passages | Gail Sheehy |
| October 24 | Passages | Gail Sheehy |
| October 31 | Passages | Gail Sheehy |
| November 7 | Passages | Gail Sheehy |
| November 14 | Passages | Gail Sheehy |
| November 21 | Roots | Alex Haley |
| November 28 | Roots | Alex Haley |
| December 5 | Passages | Gail Sheehy |
| December 12 | Roots | Alex Haley |
| December 19 | Roots | Alex Haley |
| December 26 | Passages | Gail Sheehy |

== See also ==
- Publishers Weekly list of bestselling novels in the United States in the 1970s
