= List of The New York Times number-one books of 1944 =

This is a list of books that topped The New York Times best-seller list in 1944.

== Fiction ==
The following list ranks the number one best-selling fiction books.

The most popular books of the year were Strange Fruit, by Lillian Smith and A Tree Grows in Brooklyn, by Betty Smith with respectively 22 and 15 weeks at the top. A "sleeper" success, A Tree Grows had been published fully 6 months before it eventually made it to the No. 1 spot. Somerset Maugham's mystical The Razor's Edge spent several weeks at No. 2, three times displacing Strange Fruit at No. 1.

Date	Book	Author
January 2	A Tree Grows in Brooklyn	Betty Smith
January 9	A Tree Grows in Brooklyn	Betty Smith
January 16	A Tree Grows in Brooklyn	Betty Smith
January 23	A Tree Grows in Brooklyn	Betty Smith
January 30	A Tree Grows in Brooklyn	Betty Smith
February 6	A Tree Grows in Brooklyn	Betty Smith
February 13	A Tree Grows in Brooklyn	Betty Smith
February 20	A Tree Grows in Brooklyn	Betty Smith
February 27	A Tree Grows in Brooklyn	Betty Smith
March 5	A Tree Grows in Brooklyn	Betty Smith
March 12	A Tree Grows in Brooklyn	Betty Smith
March 19	A Tree Grows in Brooklyn	Betty Smith
March 26	A Tree Grows in Brooklyn	Betty Smith
April 2	A Tree Grows in Brooklyn	Betty Smith
April 9	A Tree Grows in Brooklyn	Betty Smith
April 16	Strange Fruit	Lillian Smith
April 23	Strange Fruit	Lillian Smith
April 30	Strange Fruit	Lillian Smith
May 7	Strange Fruit	Lillian Smith
May 14	Strange Fruit	Lillian Smith
May 21	Strange Fruit	Lillian Smith
May 28	Strange Fruit	Lillian Smith
June 4	Strange Fruit	Lillian Smith
June 11	Strange Fruit	Lillian Smith
June 18	Strange Fruit	Lillian Smith
June 25	Strange Fruit	Lillian Smith
July 2	Strange Fruit	Lillian Smith
July 9	Strange Fruit	Lillian Smith
July 16	Strange Fruit	Lillian Smith
July 23	Strange Fruit	Lillian Smith
July 30	Strange Fruit	Lillian Smith
August 6	Strange Fruit	Lillian Smith
August 13	Strange Fruit	Lillian Smith
August 20	The Razor's Edge	Somerset Maugham
August 27	Strange Fruit	Lillian Smith
September 3	The Razor's Edge	Somerset Maugham
September 10	The History of Rome Hanks	Joseph S. Pennell
September 17	The History of Rome Hanks	Joseph S. Pennell
September 24	The History of Rome Hanks	Joseph S. Pennell
October 1	Strange Fruit	Lillian Smith
October 8	Strange Fruit	Lillian Smith
October 15	Strange Fruit	Lillian Smith
October 22	The Razor's Edge	Somerset Maugham
October 29	Green Dolphin Street	Elizabeth Goudge
November 5	Forever Amber	Kathleen Winsor
November 12	Forever Amber	Kathleen Winsor
November 19	Forever Amber	Kathleen Winsor
November 26	Forever Amber	Kathleen Winsor
December 3	Forever Amber	Kathleen Winsor
December 10	Forever Amber	Kathleen Winsor
December 17	Forever Amber	Kathleen Winsor
December 24	Forever Amber	Kathleen Winsor
December 31	The Green Years	A. J. Cronin

== Nonfiction ==
The following list ranks the number one best-selling nonfiction books.

Date	Book	Author
January 2	Under Cover	John Roy Carlson
January 9	Under Cover	John Roy Carlson
January 16	Under Cover	John Roy Carlson
January 23	Under Cover	John Roy Carlson
January 30	Under Cover	John Roy Carlson
February 6	Under Cover	John Roy Carlson
February 13	Good Night, Sweet Prince	Gene Fowler
February 20	Under Cover	John Roy Carlson
February 27	Good Night, Sweet Prince	Gene Fowler
March 5	Under Cover	John Roy Carlson
March 12	Good Night, Sweet Prince	Gene Fowler
March 19	Good Night, Sweet Prince	Gene Fowler
March 26	Good Night, Sweet Prince	Gene Fowler
April 2	Good Night, Sweet Prince	Gene Fowler
April 9	Good Night, Sweet Prince	Gene Fowler
April 16	Good Night, Sweet Prince	Gene Fowler
April 23	Good Night, Sweet Prince	Gene Fowler
April 30	Good Night, Sweet Prince	Gene Fowler
May 7	Good Night, Sweet Prince	Gene Fowler
May 14	Good Night, Sweet Prince	Gene Fowler
May 21	Good Night, Sweet Prince	Gene Fowler
May 28	Good Night, Sweet Prince	Gene Fowler
June 4	Good Night, Sweet Prince	Gene Fowler
June 11	Good Night, Sweet Prince	Gene Fowler
June 18	Good Night, Sweet Prince	Gene Fowler
June 25	Good Night, Sweet Prince	Gene Fowler
July 2	Yankee from Olympus	Catherine Drinker Bowen
July 9	I Never Left Home	Bob Hope
July 16	I Never Left Home	Bob Hope
July 23	I Never Left Home	Bob Hope
July 30	I Never Left Home	Bob Hope
August 6	I Never Left Home	Bob Hope
August 13	I Never Left Home	Bob Hope
August 20	I Never Left Home	Bob Hope
August 27	I Never Left Home	Bob Hope
September 3	I Never Left Home	Bob Hope
September 10	The Time for Decision	Sumner Welles
September 17	The Time for Decision	Sumner Welles
September 24	The Time for Decision	Sumner Welles
October 1	I Never Left Home	Bob Hope
October 8	I Never Left Home	Bob Hope
October 15	I Never Left Home	Bob Hope
October 22	The Time for Decision	Sumner Welles
October 29	I Never Left Home	Bob Hope
November 5	Yankee from Olympus	Catherine Drinker Bowen
November 12	I Never Left Home	Bob Hope
November 19	Yankee from Olympus	Catherine Drinker Bowen
November 26	Yankee from Olympus	Catherine Drinker Bowen
December 3	The Time for Decision	Sumner Welles
December 10	Yankee from Olympus	Catherine Drinker Bowen
December 17	The Time for Decision	Sumner Welles
December 24	Brave Men	Ernie Pyle
December 31	Brave Men	Ernie Pyle

== See also ==
- Publishers Weekly list of bestselling novels in the United States in the 1940s
