= List of The New York Times number-one books of 1941 =

This is a list of books that topped The New York Times best-seller list in 1941. When the list began in 1931 through 1941 it only reflected sales in the New York City area.

== Fiction ==
The following list ranks the number-one best-selling fiction books.

The two most popular books that year were The Keys of the Kingdom, by A. J. Cronin, which held on top of the list for 17 weeks, and This Above All by Eric Knight, which was on top of the list for 14 weeks.

Date	Book	Author
January 6	Oliver Wiswell	Kenneth Roberts
January 13	Oliver Wiswell	Kenneth Roberts
January 20	For Whom the Bell Tolls	Ernest Hemingway
January 27	Oliver Wiswell	Kenneth Roberts
February 3	For Whom the Bell Tolls	Ernest Hemingway
February 10	Oliver Wiswell	Kenneth Roberts
February 17	Random Harvest	James Hilton
February 24	Random Harvest	James Hilton
March 3	Random Harvest	James Hilton
March 10	Random Harvest	James Hilton
March 17	Random Harvest	James Hilton
March 24	Random Harvest	James Hilton
March 31	Random Harvest	James Hilton
April 7	Random Harvest	James Hilton
April 14	Random Harvest	James Hilton
April 21	Random Harvest	James Hilton
April 28	This Above All	Eric Knight
May 5	This Above All	Eric Knight
May 12	This Above All	Eric Knight
May 19	This Above All	Eric Knight
May 26	This Above All	Eric Knight
June 2	This Above All	Eric Knight
June 9	This Above All	Eric Knight
June 16	This Above All	Eric Knight
June 23	This Above All	Eric Knight
June 30	This Above All	Eric Knight
July 7	This Above All	Eric Knight
July 14	This Above All	Eric Knight
July 21	This Above All	Eric Knight
July 28	This Above All	Eric Knight
August 4	The Keys of the Kingdom	A. J. Cronin
August 11	The Keys of the Kingdom	A. J. Cronin
August 18	The Keys of the Kingdom	A. J. Cronin
August 25	The Keys of the Kingdom	A. J. Cronin
September 1	The Keys of the Kingdom	A. J. Cronin
September 8	The Keys of the Kingdom	A. J. Cronin
September 15	The Keys of the Kingdom	A. J. Cronin
September 22	The Keys of the Kingdom	A. J. Cronin
September 29	The Keys of the Kingdom	A. J. Cronin
October 6	The Keys of the Kingdom	A. J. Cronin
October 13	The Keys of the Kingdom	A. J. Cronin
October 20	The Keys of the Kingdom	A. J. Cronin
October 27	The Keys of the Kingdom	A. J. Cronin
November 3	The Keys of the Kingdom	A. J. Cronin
November 10	The Keys of the Kingdom	A. J. Cronin
November 17	Saratoga Trunk	Edna Ferber
November 24	Saratoga Trunk	Edna Ferber
December 1	The Keys of the Kingdom	A. J. Cronin
December 8	The Keys of the Kingdom	A. J. Cronin
December 15	Windswept	Mary Ellen Chase
December 22	Windswept	Mary Ellen Chase
December 29	Saratoga Trunk	Edna Ferber

== Nonfiction ==
The following list ranks the number-one best-selling nonfiction books.

Date	Book	Author
January 6	The White Cliffs	Alice Duer Miller
January 13	The White Cliffs	Alice Duer Miller
January 20	The White Cliffs	Alice Duer Miller
January 27	The White Cliffs	Alice Duer Miller
February 3	Out of the Night	Jan Valtin
February 10	Out of the Night	Jan Valtin
February 17	Out of the Night	Jan Valtin
February 24	Out of the Night	Jan Valtin
March 3	Out of the Night	Jan Valtin
March 10	Out of the Night	Jan Valtin
March 17	Out of the Night	Jan Valtin
March 24	Out of the Night	Jan Valtin
March 31	Out of the Night	Jan Valtin
April 7	Out of the Night	Jan Valtin
April 14	Out of the Night	Jan Valtin
April 21	The White Cliffs	Alice Duer Miller
April 28	Blood, Sweat and Tears	Winston Churchill
May 5	Blood, Sweat and Tears	Winston Churchill
May 12	Blood, Sweat and Tears	Winston Churchill
May 19	Blood, Sweat and Tears	Winston Churchill
May 26	Blood, Sweat and Tears	Winston Churchill
June 2	The Time is Now!	Pierre van Paassen
June 9	The Time is Now!	Pierre van Paassen
June 16	Blood, Sweat and Tears	Winston Churchill
June 23	Blood, Sweat and Tears	Winston Churchill
June 30	Berlin Diary	William L. Shirer
July 7	Berlin Diary	William L. Shirer
July 14	Berlin Diary	William L. Shirer
July 21	Berlin Diary	William L. Shirer
July 28	Berlin Diary	William L. Shirer
August 4	Berlin Diary	William L. Shirer
August 11	Berlin Diary	William L. Shirer
August 18	Berlin Diary	William L. Shirer
August 25	Berlin Diary	William L. Shirer
September 1	Berlin Diary	William L. Shirer
September 8	Berlin Diary	William L. Shirer
September 15	Berlin Diary	William L. Shirer
September 22	Berlin Diary	William L. Shirer
September 29	Berlin Diary	William L. Shirer
October 6	Berlin Diary	William L. Shirer
October 13	Berlin Diary	William L. Shirer
October 20	Berlin Diary	William L. Shirer
October 27	Berlin Diary	William L. Shirer
November 3	Berlin Diary	William L. Shirer
November 10	Berlin Diary	William L. Shirer
November 17	Berlin Diary	William L. Shirer
November 24	Berlin Diary	William L. Shirer
December 1	Berlin Diary	William L. Shirer
December 8	Berlin Diary	William L. Shirer
December 15	Berlin Diary	William L. Shirer
December 22	Berlin Diary	William L. Shirer
December 29	Berlin Diary	William L. Shirer

== See also ==
- Publishers Weekly list of bestselling novels in the United States in the 1940s
