= List of The New York Times number-one books of 1954 =

This is a list of books that topped The New York Times Best Seller list in 1954.

== Fiction ==
The following list ranks the number-one best-selling fiction books.

Date	Book	Author
January 3	Lord Vanity	Samuel Shellabarger
January 10	Lord Vanity	Samuel Shellabarger
January 17	Lord Vanity	Samuel Shellabarger
January 24	Lord Vanity	Samuel Shellabarger
January 31	Lord Vanity	Samuel Shellabarger
February 7	Lord Vanity	Samuel Shellabarger
February 14	Not as a Stranger	Morton Thompson
February 21	Not as a Stranger	Morton Thompson
February 28	Not as a Stranger	Morton Thompson
March 7	Not as a Stranger	Morton Thompson
March 14	Not as a Stranger	Morton Thompson
March 21	Not as a Stranger	Morton Thompson
March 28	Not as a Stranger	Morton Thompson
April 4	Not as a Stranger	Morton Thompson
April 11	Not as a Stranger	Morton Thompson
April 18	Not as a Stranger	Morton Thompson
April 25	Not as a Stranger	Morton Thompson
May 2	Not as a Stranger	Morton Thompson
May 9	Not as a Stranger	Morton Thompson
May 16	Not as a Stranger	Morton Thompson
May 23	Not as a Stranger	Morton Thompson
May 30	Not as a Stranger	Morton Thompson
June 6	Not as a Stranger	Morton Thompson
June 13	Not as a Stranger	Morton Thompson
June 20	Not as a Stranger	Morton Thompson
June 27	Not as a Stranger	Morton Thompson
July 4	Not as a Stranger	Morton Thompson
July 11	Not as a Stranger	Morton Thompson
July 18	Not as a Stranger	Morton Thompson
July 25	Not as a Stranger	Morton Thompson
August 1	Mary Anne	Daphne du Maurier
August 8	Mary Anne	Daphne du Maurier
August 15	Mary Anne	Daphne du Maurier
August 22	Mary Anne	Daphne du Maurier
August 29	Mary Anne	Daphne du Maurier
September 5	Mary Anne	Daphne du Maurier
September 12	Mary Anne	Daphne du Maurier
September 19	Mary Anne	Daphne du Maurier
September 26	Mary Anne	Daphne du Maurier
October 3	Mary Anne	Daphne du Maurier
October 10	Mary Anne	Daphne du Maurier
October 17	Love is Eternal	Irving Stone
October 24	Love is Eternal	Irving Stone
October 31	Love is Eternal	Irving Stone
November 7	Love is Eternal	Irving Stone
November 14	Love is Eternal	Irving Stone
November 21	Love is Eternal	Irving Stone
November 28	Love is Eternal	Irving Stone
December 5	Love is Eternal	Irving Stone
December 12	Love is Eternal	Irving Stone
December 19	Love is Eternal	Irving Stone
December 26	Love is Eternal	Irving Stone

== Nonfiction ==
The following list ranks the number-one best-selling nonfiction books.

Date	Book	Author
January 3	The Power of Positive Thinking	Norman Vincent Peale
January 10	The Power of Positive Thinking	Norman Vincent Peale
January 17	The Power of Positive Thinking	Norman Vincent Peale
January 24	The Power of Positive Thinking	Norman Vincent Peale
January 31	The Power of Positive Thinking	Norman Vincent Peale
February 7	The Power of Positive Thinking	Norman Vincent Peale
February 14	The Power of Positive Thinking	Norman Vincent Peale
February 21	The Power of Positive Thinking	Norman Vincent Peale
February 28	The Power of Positive Thinking	Norman Vincent Peale
March 7	The Power of Positive Thinking	Norman Vincent Peale
March 14	The Power of Positive Thinking	Norman Vincent Peale
March 21	The Power of Positive Thinking	Norman Vincent Peale
March 28	The Power of Positive Thinking	Norman Vincent Peale
April 4	The Power of Positive Thinking	Norman Vincent Peale
April 11	The Power of Positive Thinking	Norman Vincent Peale
April 18	But We Were Born Free	Elmer Holmes Davis
April 25	But We Were Born Free	Elmer Holmes Davis
May 2	The Power of Positive Thinking	Norman Vincent Peale
May 9	The Power of Positive Thinking	Norman Vincent Peale
May 16	The Power of Positive Thinking	Norman Vincent Peale
May 23	The Power of Positive Thinking	Norman Vincent Peale
May 30	The Power of Positive Thinking	Norman Vincent Peale
June 6	The Power of Positive Thinking	Norman Vincent Peale
June 13	The Power of Positive Thinking	Norman Vincent Peale
June 20	The Power of Positive Thinking	Norman Vincent Peale
June 27	The Power of Positive Thinking	Norman Vincent Peale
July 4	The Power of Positive Thinking	Norman Vincent Peale
July 11	The Power of Positive Thinking	Norman Vincent Peale
July 18	The Power of Positive Thinking	Norman Vincent Peale
July 25	The Power of Positive Thinking	Norman Vincent Peale
August 1	The Power of Positive Thinking	Norman Vincent Peale
August 8	The Power of Positive Thinking	Norman Vincent Peale
August 15	The Power of Positive Thinking	Norman Vincent Peale
August 22	The Power of Positive Thinking	Norman Vincent Peale
August 29	The Power of Positive Thinking	Norman Vincent Peale
September 5	The Power of Positive Thinking	Norman Vincent Peale
September 12	The Power of Positive Thinking	Norman Vincent Peale
September 19	The Power of Positive Thinking	Norman Vincent Peale
September 26	The Power of Positive Thinking	Norman Vincent Peale
October 3	The Power of Positive Thinking	Norman Vincent Peale
October 10	The Power of Positive Thinking	Norman Vincent Peale
October 17	The Power of Positive Thinking	Norman Vincent Peale
October 24	The Power of Positive Thinking	Norman Vincent Peale
October 31	The Power of Positive Thinking	Norman Vincent Peale
November 7	The Power of Positive Thinking	Norman Vincent Peale
November 14	The Power of Positive Thinking	Norman Vincent Peale
November 21	The Power of Positive Thinking	Norman Vincent Peale
November 28	The Power of Positive Thinking	Norman Vincent Peale
December 5	The Power of Positive Thinking	Norman Vincent Peale
December 12	The Power of Positive Thinking	Norman Vincent Peale
December 19	The Power of Positive Thinking	Norman Vincent Peale
December 26	The Power of Positive Thinking	Norman Vincent Peale

== See also ==
- Publishers Weekly list of bestselling novels in the United States in the 1950s
