= List of The New York Times number-one books of 1965 =

This is a list of books that topped The New York Times best-seller list in 1965.

== Fiction ==
The following list ranks the number-one best-selling fiction books.

Only three titles topped the list in 1965. The most popular was The Source by James Michener, which dominated the second half of the year, even through a three-week newspaper strike. The other two titles were Herzog, by Saul Bellow, which completed a run at the top for more than half a year, begun in October 1964 (29 weeks), and Up the Down Staircase by Bel Kaufman (8 weeks, and another 32 at No. 2, in all spending 65 weeks in the top 10 bestsellers). Coincidentally, both of the latter titles, Herzog and Staircase, are epistolary novels, featuring the extensive use of letters.

Date	Book	Author
January 3	Herzog	Saul Bellow
January 10	Herzog	Saul Bellow
January 17	Herzog	Saul Bellow
January 24	Herzog	Saul Bellow
January 31	Herzog	Saul Bellow
February 7	Herzog	Saul Bellow
February 14	Herzog	Saul Bellow
February 21	Herzog	Saul Bellow
February 28	Herzog	Saul Bellow
March 7	Herzog	Saul Bellow
March 14	Herzog	Saul Bellow
March 21	Herzog	Saul Bellow
March 28	Herzog	Saul Bellow
April 4	Herzog	Saul Bellow
April 11	Herzog	Saul Bellow
April 18	Herzog	Saul Bellow
April 25	Herzog	Saul Bellow
May 2	Herzog	Saul Bellow
May 9	Herzog	Saul Bellow
May 16	Up the Down Staircase	Bel Kaufman
May 23	Up the Down Staircase	Bel Kaufman
May 30	Up the Down Staircase	Bel Kaufman
June 6	Up the Down Staircase	Bel Kaufman
June 13	Up the Down Staircase	Bel Kaufman
June 20	Up the Down Staircase	Bel Kaufman
June 27	Up the Down Staircase	Bel Kaufman
July 4	Up the Down Staircase	Bel Kaufman
July 11	The Source	James Michener
July 18	The Source	James Michener
July 25	The Source	James Michener
August 1	The Source	James Michener
August 8	The Source	James Michener
August 15	The Source	James Michener
August 22	The Source	James Michener
August 29	The Source	James Michener
September 5	The Source	James Michener
September 12	The Source	James Michener
September 19	The Source	James Michener
September 26	The Source	James Michener
October 3	The Source	James Michener
October 10	The Source	James Michener
October 17	Not published due to a newspaper strike	
October 24	Not published due to a newspaper strike	
October 31	The Source	James Michener
November 7	The Source	James Michener
November 14	The Source	James Michener
November 21	The Source	James Michener
November 28	The Source	James Michener
December 5	The Source	James Michener
December 12	The Source	James Michener
December 19	The Source	James Michener
December 26	The Source	James Michener

== Nonfiction ==
The following list ranks the number-one best-selling nonfiction books.

Date	Book	Author
January 3	Markings	Dag Hammarskjöld
January 10	Markings	Dag Hammarskjöld
January 17	Markings	Dag Hammarskjöld
January 24	Markings	Dag Hammarskjöld
January 31	Markings	Dag Hammarskjöld
February 7	Markings	Dag Hammarskjöld
February 14	Markings	Dag Hammarskjöld
February 21	Markings	Dag Hammarskjöld
February 28	Markings	Dag Hammarskjöld
March 7	Markings	Dag Hammarskjöld
March 14	Markings	Dag Hammarskjöld
March 21	Markings	Dag Hammarskjöld
March 28	Markings	Dag Hammarskjöld
April 4	Markings	Dag Hammarskjöld
April 11	Markings	Dag Hammarskjöld
April 18	Markings	Dag Hammarskjöld
April 25	Markings	Dag Hammarskjöld
May 2	Markings	Dag Hammarskjöld
May 9	Markings	Dag Hammarskjöld
May 16	Markings	Dag Hammarskjöld
May 23	Markings	Dag Hammarskjöld
May 30	Markings	Dag Hammarskjöld
June 6	Markings	Dag Hammarskjöld
June 13	Markings	Dag Hammarskjöld
June 20	Markings	Dag Hammarskjöld
June 27	Markings	Dag Hammarskjöld
July 4	Markings	Dag Hammarskjöld
July 11	Markings	Dag Hammarskjöld
July 18	Markings	Dag Hammarskjöld
July 25	Markings	Dag Hammarskjöld
August 1	The Making of the President 1964	Theodore H. White
August 8	The Making of the President 1964	Theodore H. White
August 15	The Making of the President 1964	Theodore H. White
August 22	The Making of the President 1964	Theodore H. White
August 29	The Making of the President 1964	Theodore H. White
September 5	The Making of the President 1964	Theodore H. White
September 12	The Making of the President 1964	Theodore H. White
September 19	The Making of the President 1964	Theodore H. White
September 26	The Making of the President 1964	Theodore H. White
October 3	The Making of the President 1964	Theodore H. White
October 10	The Making of the President 1964	Theodore H. White
October 17	Not published due to a newspaper strike	
October 24	Not published due to a newspaper strike	
October 31	Kennedy	Ted Sorensen
November 7	Kennedy	Ted Sorensen
November 14	Kennedy	Ted Sorensen
November 21	Kennedy	Ted Sorensen
November 28	Kennedy	Ted Sorensen
December 5	Kennedy	Ted Sorensen
December 12	Kennedy	Ted Sorensen
December 19	Kennedy	Ted Sorensen
December 26	Kennedy	Ted Sorensen

== See also ==
- Publishers Weekly list of bestselling novels in the United States in the 1960s
