= List of The New York Times number-one books of 1931 =

This is a list of books that topped The New York Times best-seller list in 1931.

This was the first year that the list was published, though it was not yet a national list. Throughout the 1930s the list reflected sales in the New York City area.

== Fiction ==
The following list ranks the number-one best-selling fiction books.

Date	Book	Author
October 12	The Ten Commandments	Warwick Deeping
October 19	No List Published	
October 26	No List Published	
November 2	No List Published	
November 9	No List Published	
November 16	Maid in Waiting	John Galsworthy
November 23	No List Published	
November 30	Maid in Waiting	John Galsworthy
December 7	Maid in Waiting	John Galsworthy
December 14	Maid in Waiting	John Galsworthy
December 21	Maid in Waiting	John Galsworthy
December 28	Maid in Waiting	John Galsworthy

== Nonfiction ==
The following list ranks the number-one best-selling nonfiction books.

Date	Book	Author
October 12	Ellen Terry and Bernard Shaw: A Correspondence	Ellen Terry and Bernard Shaw
October 19	No List Published	
October 26	No List Published	
November 2	No List Published	
November 9	No List Published	
November 16	Ellen Terry and Bernard Shaw: A Correspondence	Ellen Terry and Bernard Shaw
November 23	No List Published	
November 30	Washington Merry-Go-Round	Anonymous (Drew Pearson and Robert S. Allen)
December 7	Bernard Shaw	Frank Harris
December 14	The Epic of America	James Truslow Adams
December 21	Mourning Becomes Electra	Eugene O'Neill
December 28	The Epic of America	James Truslow Adams

== See also ==
- Publishers Weekly list of bestselling novels in the United States in the 1930s
