= List of The New York Times number-one books of 1981 =

The American daily newspaper The New York Times publishes multiple weekly lists ranking the best-selling books in the United States.

== Fiction ==
The following list ranks the number-one best-selling fiction books, in the hardcover fiction category.

| Date | Book | Author |
|---|---|---|
| January 4 | The Covenant | James Michener |
| January 11 | The Covenant | James Michener |
| January 18 | The Covenant | James Michener |
| January 25 | The Covenant | James Michener |
| February 1 | The Covenant | James Michener |
| February 8 | The Covenant | James Michener |
| February 15 | The Covenant | James Michener |
| February 22 | The Covenant | James Michener |
| March 1 | The Covenant | James Michener |
| March 8 | The Covenant | James Michener |
| March 15 | The Covenant | James Michener |
| March 22 | The Covenant | James Michener |
| March 29 | The Covenant | James Michener |
| April 5 | The Covenant | James Michener |
| April 12 | The Covenant | James Michener |
| April 19 | The Covenant | James Michener |
| April 26 | Gorky Park | Martin Cruz Smith |
| May 3 | Gorky Park | Martin Cruz Smith |
| May 10 | Noble House | James Clavell |
| May 17 | Noble House | James Clavell |
| May 24 | Noble House | James Clavell |
| May 31 | Noble House | James Clavell |
| June 7 | Noble House | James Clavell |
| June 14 | Noble House | James Clavell |
| June 21 | Noble House | James Clavell |
| June 28 | Noble House | James Clavell |
| July 5 | Noble House | James Clavell |
| July 12 | Noble House | James Clavell |
| July 19 | Noble House | James Clavell |
| July 26 | Noble House | James Clavell |
| August 2 | Noble House | James Clavell |
| August 9 | Noble House | James Clavell |
| August 16 | Noble House | James Clavell |
| August 23 | Cujo | Stephen King |
| August 30 | Cujo | Stephen King |
| September 6 | Cujo | Stephen King |
| September 13 | Cujo | Stephen King |
| September 20 | Cujo | Stephen King |
| September 27 | The Hotel New Hampshire | John Irving |
| October 4 | The Hotel New Hampshire | John Irving |
| October 11 | The Hotel New Hampshire | John Irving |
| October 18 | The Hotel New Hampshire | John Irving |
| October 25 | The Hotel New Hampshire | John Irving |
| November 1 | The Hotel New Hampshire | John Irving |
| November 8 | The Hotel New Hampshire | John Irving |
| November 15 | An Indecent Obsession | Colleen McCullough |
| November 22 | An Indecent Obsession | Colleen McCullough |
| November 29 | An Indecent Obsession | Colleen McCullough |
| December 6 | An Indecent Obsession | Colleen McCullough |
| December 13 | An Indecent Obsession | Colleen McCullough |
| December 20 | An Indecent Obsession | Colleen McCullough |
| December 27 | An Indecent Obsession | Colleen McCullough |

== Nonfiction ==
The following list ranks the number-one best-selling nonfiction books, in the hardcover nonfiction category.

| Date | Book | Author |
|---|---|---|
| January 4 | Cosmos | Carl Sagan |
| January 11 | Cosmos | Carl Sagan |
| January 18 | Cosmos | Carl Sagan |
| January 25 | Crisis Investing | Douglas R. Casey |
| February 1 | Crisis Investing | Douglas R. Casey |
| February 8 | Crisis Investing | Douglas R. Casey |
| February 15 | Cosmos | Carl Sagan |
| February 22 | Cosmos | Carl Sagan |
| March 1 | Cosmos | Carl Sagan |
| March 8 | Never-Say-Diet Book | Richard Simmons |
| March 15 | Never-Say-Diet Book | Richard Simmons |
| March 22 | Cosmos | Carl Sagan |
| March 29 | Cosmos | Carl Sagan |
| April 5 | Never-Say-Diet Book | Richard Simmons |
| April 12 | Never-Say-Diet Book | Richard Simmons |
| April 19 | Never-Say-Diet Book | Richard Simmons |
| April 26 | Never-Say-Diet Book | Richard Simmons |
| May 3 | Never-Say-Diet Book | Richard Simmons |
| May 10 | Never-Say-Diet Book | Richard Simmons |
| May 17 | The Lord God Made Them All | James Herriot |
| May 24 | The Lord God Made Them All | James Herriot |
| May 31 | The Lord God Made Them All | James Herriot |
| June 7 | The Lord God Made Them All | James Herriot |
| June 14 | The Lord God Made Them All | James Herriot |
| June 21 | The Lord God Made Them All | James Herriot |
| June 28 | The Lord God Made Them All | James Herriot |
| July 5 | The Lord God Made Them All | James Herriot |
| July 12 | The Beverly Hills Diet | Judy Mazel |
| July 19 | The Beverly Hills Diet | Judy Mazel |
| July 26 | The Beverly Hills Diet | Judy Mazel |
| August 2 | The Beverly Hills Diet | Judy Mazel |
| August 9 | The Beverly Hills Diet | Judy Mazel |
| August 16 | The Beverly Hills Diet | Judy Mazel |
| August 23 | The Beverly Hills Diet | Judy Mazel |
| August 30 | The Beverly Hills Diet | Judy Mazel |
| September 6 | The Beverly Hills Diet | Judy Mazel |
| September 13 | The Beverly Hills Diet | Judy Mazel |
| September 20 | The Beverly Hills Diet | Judy Mazel |
| September 27 | The Beverly Hills Diet | Judy Mazel |
| October 4 | The Beverly Hills Diet | Judy Mazel |
| October 11 | The Beverly Hills Diet | Judy Mazel |
| October 18 | The Beverly Hills Diet | Judy Mazel |
| October 25 | Never-Say-Diet Book | Richard Simmons |
| November 1 | The Beverly Hills Diet | Judy Mazel |
| November 8 | The Lord God Made Them All | James Herriot |
| November 15 | Never-Say-Diet Book | Richard Simmons |
| November 22 | Never-Say-Diet Book | Richard Simmons |
| November 29 | A Light in the Attic | Shel Silverstein |
| December 6 | A Light in the Attic | Shel Silverstein |
| December 13 | A Light in the Attic | Shel Silverstein |
| December 20 | A Light in the Attic | Shel Silverstein |
| December 27 | A Light in the Attic | Shel Silverstein |

== See also ==
- Publishers Weekly list of bestselling novels in the United States in the 1980s
