= List of The New York Times number-one books of 1957 =

This is a list of books that topped The New York Times Best Seller list in 1957.

== Fiction ==
The following list ranks the number-one best-selling fiction books.

Date	Book	Author
January 6	Peyton Place	Grace Metalious
January 13	Peyton Place	Grace Metalious
January 20	Peyton Place	Grace Metalious
January 27	Peyton Place	Grace Metalious
February 3	Peyton Place	Grace Metalious
February 10	Peyton Place	Grace Metalious
February 17	Peyton Place	Grace Metalious
February 24	Peyton Place	Grace Metalious
March 3	Peyton Place	Grace Metalious
March 10	Peyton Place	Grace Metalious
March 17	Peyton Place	Grace Metalious
March 24	The Scapegoat	Daphne du Maurier
March 31	The Scapegoat	Daphne du Maurier
April 7	The Scapegoat	Daphne du Maurier
April 14	The Scapegoat	Daphne du Maurier
April 21	The Scapegoat	Daphne du Maurier
April 28	The Scapegoat	Daphne du Maurier
May 5	The Scapegoat	Daphne du Maurier
May 12	The Scapegoat	Daphne du Maurier
May 19	The Scapegoat	Daphne du Maurier
May 26	The Scapegoat	Daphne du Maurier
June 2	The Scapegoat	Daphne du Maurier
June 9	The Scapegoat	Daphne du Maurier
June 16	The Scapegoat	Daphne du Maurier
June 23	The Scapegoat	Daphne du Maurier
June 30	Peyton Place	Grace Metalious
July 7	Peyton Place	Grace Metalious
July 14	Peyton Place	Grace Metalious
July 21	Peyton Place	Grace Metalious
July 28	Peyton Place	Grace Metalious
August 4	Peyton Place	Grace Metalious
August 11	Peyton Place	Grace Metalious
August 18	Peyton Place	Grace Metalious
August 25	Peyton Place	Grace Metalious
September 1	Peyton Place	Grace Metalious
September 8	Peyton Place	Grace Metalious
September 15	Peyton Place	Grace Metalious
September 22	By Love Possessed	James Gould Cozzens
September 29	By Love Possessed	James Gould Cozzens
October 6	By Love Possessed	James Gould Cozzens
October 13	By Love Possessed	James Gould Cozzens
October 20	By Love Possessed	James Gould Cozzens
October 27	By Love Possessed	James Gould Cozzens
November 3	By Love Possessed	James Gould Cozzens
November 10	By Love Possessed	James Gould Cozzens
November 17	By Love Possessed	James Gould Cozzens
November 24	By Love Possessed	James Gould Cozzens
December 1	By Love Possessed	James Gould Cozzens
December 8	By Love Possessed	James Gould Cozzens
December 15	By Love Possessed	James Gould Cozzens
December 22	By Love Possessed	James Gould Cozzens
December 29	By Love Possessed	James Gould Cozzens

== Nonfiction ==
The following list ranks the number-one best-selling nonfiction books.

Date	Book	Author
January 6	The Nun's Story	Kathryn Hulme
January 13	The Nun's Story	Kathryn Hulme
January 20	The Nun's Story	Kathryn Hulme
January 27	The Nun's Story	Kathryn Hulme
February 3	The FBI Story	Don Whitehead
February 10	The FBI Story	Don Whitehead
February 17	The FBI Story	Don Whitehead
February 24	The FBI Story	Don Whitehead
March 3	The FBI Story	Don Whitehead
March 10	The FBI Story	Don Whitehead
March 17	The FBI Story	Don Whitehead
March 24	The FBI Story	Don Whitehead
March 31	The FBI Story	Don Whitehead
April 7	The FBI Story	Don Whitehead
April 14	The FBI Story	Don Whitehead
April 21	The FBI Story	Don Whitehead
April 28	The FBI Story	Don Whitehead
May 5	The FBI Story	Don Whitehead
May 12	The FBI Story	Don Whitehead
May 19	The FBI Story	Don Whitehead
May 26	Day of Infamy	Walter Lord
June 2	The FBI Story	Don Whitehead
June 9	Day of Infamy	Walter Lord
June 16	Day of Infamy	Walter Lord
June 23	The Day Christ Died	Jim Bishop
June 30	The Day Christ Died	Jim Bishop
July 7	The Day Christ Died	Jim Bishop
July 14	The Day Christ Died	Jim Bishop
July 21	The Day Christ Died	Jim Bishop
July 28	The Day Christ Died	Jim Bishop
August 4	The Hidden Persuaders	Vance Packard
August 11	The Hidden Persuaders	Vance Packard
August 18	The Day Christ Died	Jim Bishop
August 25	The Hidden Persuaders	Vance Packard
September 1	The Hidden Persuaders	Vance Packard
September 8	The Hidden Persuaders	Vance Packard
September 15	The Hidden Persuaders	Vance Packard
September 22	Baruch: My Own Story	Bernard Baruch
September 29	Baruch: My Own Story	Bernard Baruch
October 6	Baruch: My Own Story	Bernard Baruch
October 13	Baruch: My Own Story	Bernard Baruch
October 20	Baruch: My Own Story	Bernard Baruch
October 27	Baruch: My Own Story	Bernard Baruch
November 3	Baruch: My Own Story	Bernard Baruch
November 10	Baruch: My Own Story	Bernard Baruch
November 17	Baruch: My Own Story	Bernard Baruch
November 24	Baruch: My Own Story	Bernard Baruch
December 1	Baruch: My Own Story	Bernard Baruch
December 8	Baruch: My Own Story	Bernard Baruch
December 15	Baruch: My Own Story	Bernard Baruch
December 22	Baruch: My Own Story	Bernard Baruch
December 29	Baruch: My Own Story	Bernard Baruch

== See also ==
- Publishers Weekly list of bestselling novels in the United States in the 1950s
