= List of The New York Times number-one books of 1966 =

This is a list of books that topped The New York Times Best Seller list in 1966.

== Fiction ==
The following list ranks the number-one best-selling fiction books.

Only three novels topped the list that year, which was dominated by Jacqueline Susann's Valley of the Dolls which spent 28 weeks at the top of the list and 65 weeks in the top 10. Valley was toppled by Robert Crichton's The Secret of Santa Vittoria, a World War II story based on fact, which sold more than 100,000 copies in the first month of its release. It spent 18 weeks at the top of the list and nearly a year in the top 10. The other top seller of the year, James Michener's The Source, spent 36 weeks at the top of the list in 1965 and 1966.

Date	Book	Author
January 2	The Source	James Michener
January 9	The Source	James Michener
January 16	The Source	James Michener
January 23	The Source	James Michener
January 30	The Source	James Michener
February 6	The Source	James Michener
February 13	The Source	James Michener
February 20	The Source	James Michener
February 27	The Source	James Michener
March 6	The Source	James Michener
March 13	The Source	James Michener
March 20	The Source	James Michener
March 27	The Source	James Michener
April 3	The Source	James Michener
April 10	The Source	James Michener
April 17	The Source	James Michener
April 24	The Source	James Michener
May 1	The Source	James Michener
May 8	Valley of the Dolls	Jacqueline Susann
May 15	Valley of the Dolls	Jacqueline Susann
May 22	Valley of the Dolls	Jacqueline Susann
May 29	Valley of the Dolls	Jacqueline Susann
June 5	Valley of the Dolls	Jacqueline Susann
June 12	Valley of the Dolls	Jacqueline Susann
June 19	Valley of the Dolls	Jacqueline Susann
June 26	Valley of the Dolls	Jacqueline Susann
July 3	Valley of the Dolls	Jacqueline Susann
July 10	Valley of the Dolls	Jacqueline Susann
July 17	Valley of the Dolls	Jacqueline Susann
July 24	Valley of the Dolls	Jacqueline Susann
July 31	Valley of the Dolls	Jacqueline Susann
August 7	Valley of the Dolls	Jacqueline Susann
August 14	Valley of the Dolls	Jacqueline Susann
August 21	Valley of the Dolls	Jacqueline Susann
August 28	Valley of the Dolls	Jacqueline Susann
September 4	Valley of the Dolls	Jacqueline Susann
September 11	Valley of the Dolls	Jacqueline Susann
September 18	Valley of the Dolls	Jacqueline Susann
September 25	Valley of the Dolls	Jacqueline Susann
October 2	Valley of the Dolls	Jacqueline Susann
October 9	Valley of the Dolls	Jacqueline Susann
October 16	Valley of the Dolls	Jacqueline Susann
October 23	Valley of the Dolls	Jacqueline Susann
October 30	Valley of the Dolls	Jacqueline Susann
November 6	Valley of the Dolls	Jacqueline Susann
November 13	Valley of the Dolls	Jacqueline Susann
November 20	The Secret of Santa Vittoria	Robert Crichton
November 27	The Secret of Santa Vittoria	Robert Crichton
December 4	The Secret of Santa Vittoria	Robert Crichton
December 11	The Secret of Santa Vittoria	Robert Crichton
December 18	The Secret of Santa Vittoria	Robert Crichton
December 26	The Secret of Santa Vittoria	Robert Crichton

== Nonfiction ==
The following list ranks the number-one best-selling nonfiction books.

Date	Book	Author
January 2	Kennedy	Ted Sorensen
January 9	A Thousand Days	Arthur M. Schlesinger Jr.
January 16	A Thousand Days	Arthur M. Schlesinger Jr.
January 23	A Thousand Days	Arthur M. Schlesinger Jr.
January 30	A Thousand Days	Arthur M. Schlesinger Jr.
February 6	In Cold Blood	Truman Capote
February 13	In Cold Blood	Truman Capote
February 20	In Cold Blood	Truman Capote
February 27	In Cold Blood	Truman Capote
March 6	In Cold Blood	Truman Capote
March 13	In Cold Blood	Truman Capote
March 20	In Cold Blood	Truman Capote
March 27	In Cold Blood	Truman Capote
April 3	In Cold Blood	Truman Capote
April 10	In Cold Blood	Truman Capote
April 17	In Cold Blood	Truman Capote
April 24	In Cold Blood	Truman Capote
May 1	In Cold Blood	Truman Capote
May 8	The Last Battle	Cornelius Ryan
May 15	In Cold Blood	Truman Capote
May 22	The Last Battle	Cornelius Ryan
May 29	The Last Battle	Cornelius Ryan
June 5	The Last Battle	Cornelius Ryan
June 12	The Last Battle	Cornelius Ryan
June 19	The Last Battle	Cornelius Ryan
June 26	The Last Battle	Cornelius Ryan
July 3	The Last Battle	Cornelius Ryan
July 10	The Last Battle	Cornelius Ryan
July 17	How to Avoid Probate	Norman F. Dacey
July 24	How to Avoid Probate	Norman F. Dacey
July 31	How to Avoid Probate	Norman F. Dacey
August 7	How to Avoid Probate	Norman F. Dacey
August 14	How to Avoid Probate	Norman F. Dacey
August 21	How to Avoid Probate	Norman F. Dacey
August 28	How to Avoid Probate	Norman F. Dacey
September 4	How to Avoid Probate	Norman F. Dacey
September 11	How to Avoid Probate	Norman F. Dacey
September 18	How to Avoid Probate	Norman F. Dacey
September 25	How to Avoid Probate	Norman F. Dacey
October 2	How to Avoid Probate	Norman F. Dacey
October 9	How to Avoid Probate	Norman F. Dacey
October 16	How to Avoid Probate	Norman F. Dacey
October 23	How to Avoid Probate	Norman F. Dacey
October 30	How to Avoid Probate	Norman F. Dacey
November 6	How to Avoid Probate	Norman F. Dacey
November 13	Rush to Judgment	Mark Lane
November 20	Rush to Judgment	Mark Lane
November 27	Rush to Judgment	Mark Lane
December 4	Rush to Judgment	Mark Lane
December 11	Rush to Judgment	Mark Lane
December 18	Rush to Judgment	Mark Lane
December 26	Rush to Judgment	Mark Lane

== See also ==
- Publishers Weekly list of bestselling novels in the United States in the 1960s
