= List of The New York Times number-one books of 1946 =

This is a list of books that topped The New York Times best-seller list in 1946.

== Fiction ==
The following list ranks the number-one best-selling fiction books. The most popular title was The Hucksters which spent much of the latter half of the year (19 weeks) at the top of the list and a total of 35 weeks among the top 15. During its reign at the top, it was challenged, but never toppled, by two recognized classics, George Orwell's Animal Farm and Robert Penn Warren's All the King's Men, neither of which ever reached the top spot.

Date	Book	Author
January 6	The Black Rose	Thomas Costain
January 13	The Black Rose	Thomas Costain
January 20	The Black Rose	Thomas Costain
January 27	The Black Rose	Thomas Costain
February 3	The King's General	Daphne du Maurier
February 10	The King's General	Daphne du Maurier
February 17	The King's General	Daphne du Maurier
February 24	The King's General	Daphne du Maurier
March 3	The King's General	Daphne du Maurier
March 10	Arch of Triumph	Erich Maria Remarque
March 17	The King's General	Daphne du Maurier
March 24	Arch of Triumph	Erich Maria Remarque
March 31	Arch of Triumph	Erich Maria Remarque
April 7	Arch of Triumph	Erich Maria Remarque
April 14	Arch of Triumph	Erich Maria Remarque
April 21	Arch of Triumph	Erich Maria Remarque
April 28	Arch of Triumph	Erich Maria Remarque
May 5	Arch of Triumph	Erich Maria Remarque
May 12	This Side of Innocence	Taylor Caldwell
May 19	This Side of Innocence	Taylor Caldwell
May 26	This Side of Innocence	Taylor Caldwell
June 2	This Side of Innocence	Taylor Caldwell
June 9	This Side of Innocence	Taylor Caldwell
June 16	This Side of Innocence	Taylor Caldwell
June 23	This Side of Innocence	Taylor Caldwell
June 30	This Side of Innocence	Taylor Caldwell
July 7	This Side of Innocence	Taylor Caldwell
July 14	The Hucksters	Frederic Wakeman
July 21	The Hucksters	Frederic Wakeman
July 28	The Hucksters	Frederic Wakeman
August 4	The Hucksters	Frederic Wakeman
August 11	The Hucksters	Frederic Wakeman
August 18	The Hucksters	Frederic Wakeman
August 25	The Hucksters	Frederic Wakeman
September 1	The Hucksters	Frederic Wakeman
September 8	The Hucksters	Frederic Wakeman
September 15	The Hucksters	Frederic Wakeman
September 22	The Hucksters	Frederic Wakeman
September 29	The Hucksters	Frederic Wakeman
October 6	The Hucksters	Frederic Wakeman
October 13	The Hucksters	Frederic Wakeman
October 20	The Hucksters	Frederic Wakeman
October 27	The Hucksters	Frederic Wakeman
November 3	The Hucksters	Frederic Wakeman
November 10	The Hucksters	Frederic Wakeman
November 17	The Hucksters	Frederic Wakeman
November 24	East River	Sholem Asch
December 1	B.F.'s Daughter	John P. Marquand
December 8	B.F.'s Daughter	John P. Marquand
December 15	B.F.'s Daughter	John P. Marquand
December 22	B.F.'s Daughter	John P. Marquand
December 29	B.F.'s Daughter	John P. Marquand

== Nonfiction ==
The following list ranks the number-one best-selling nonfiction books.

Date	Book	Author
January 6	The Egg and I	Betty MacDonald
January 13	Up Front	Bill Mauldin
January 20	The Egg and I	Betty MacDonald
January 27	The Egg and I	Betty MacDonald
February 3	The Egg and I	Betty MacDonald
February 10	The Egg and I	Betty MacDonald
February 17	The Egg and I	Betty MacDonald
February 24	The Egg and I	Betty MacDonald
March 3	The Egg and I	Betty MacDonald
March 10	The Egg and I	Betty MacDonald
March 17	The Egg and I	Betty MacDonald
March 24	The Egg and I	Betty MacDonald
March 31	The Egg and I	Betty MacDonald
April 7	The Egg and I	Betty MacDonald
April 14	The Egg and I	Betty MacDonald
April 21	The Egg and I	Betty MacDonald
April 28	The Egg and I	Betty MacDonald
May 5	The Egg and I	Betty MacDonald
May 12	The Egg and I	Betty MacDonald
May 19	The Egg and I	Betty MacDonald
May 26	The Egg and I	Betty MacDonald
June 2	The Egg and I	Betty MacDonald
June 9	The Egg and I	Betty MacDonald
June 16	The Egg and I	Betty MacDonald
June 23	The Egg and I	Betty MacDonald
June 30	The Egg and I	Betty MacDonald
July 7	The Egg and I	Betty MacDonald
July 14	The Egg and I	Betty MacDonald
July 21	The Egg and I	Betty MacDonald
July 28	The Egg and I	Betty MacDonald
August 4	The Egg and I	Betty MacDonald
August 11	The Egg and I	Betty MacDonald
August 18	The Egg and I	Betty MacDonald
August 25	The Egg and I	Betty MacDonald
September 1	The Egg and I	Betty MacDonald
September 8	The Egg and I	Betty MacDonald
September 15	The Egg and I	Betty MacDonald
September 22	The Egg and I	Betty MacDonald
September 29	The Egg and I	Betty MacDonald
October 6	The Egg and I	Betty MacDonald
October 13	The Egg and I	Betty MacDonald
October 20	The Egg and I	Betty MacDonald
October 27	Peace of Mind	Joshua L. Liebman
November 3	Peace of Mind	Joshua L. Liebman
November 10	Peace of Mind	Joshua L. Liebman
November 17	Peace of Mind	Joshua L. Liebman
November 24	Peace of Mind	Joshua L. Liebman
December 1	Peace of Mind	Joshua L. Liebman
December 8	Peace of Mind	Joshua L. Liebman
December 15	Peace of Mind	Joshua L. Liebman
December 22	Peace of Mind	Joshua L. Liebman
December 29	Peace of Mind	Joshua L. Liebman

== See also ==
- Publishers Weekly list of bestselling novels in the United States in the 1940s
