= List of The New York Times number-one books of 1956 =

This is a list of books that topped The New York Times Best Seller list in 1956.

== Fiction ==
The following list ranks the number-one best-selling fiction books.

| Date | Book | Author |
|---|---|---|
| January 1 | Andersonville | MacKinlay Kantor |
| January 8 | Andersonville | MacKinlay Kantor |
| January 15 | Andersonville | MacKinlay Kantor |
| January 22 | Andersonville | MacKinlay Kantor |
| January 29 | Andersonville | MacKinlay Kantor |
| February 5 | Andersonville | MacKinlay Kantor |
| February 12 | Andersonville | MacKinlay Kantor |
| February 19 | Andersonville | MacKinlay Kantor |
| February 26 | Andersonville | MacKinlay Kantor |
| March 4 | Andersonville | MacKinlay Kantor |
| March 11 | Andersonville | MacKinlay Kantor |
| March 18 | Andersonville | MacKinlay Kantor |
| March 25 | The Last Hurrah | Edwin O'Connor |
| April 1 | The Last Hurrah | Edwin O'Connor |
| April 8 | The Last Hurrah | Edwin O'Connor |
| April 15 | The Last Hurrah | Edwin O'Connor |
| April 22 | The Last Hurrah | Edwin O'Connor |
| April 29 | The Last Hurrah | Edwin O'Connor |
| May 6 | The Last Hurrah | Edwin O'Connor |
| May 13 | The Last Hurrah | Edwin O'Connor |
| May 20 | The Last Hurrah | Edwin O'Connor |
| May 27 | The Last Hurrah | Edwin O'Connor |
| June 3 | The Last Hurrah | Edwin O'Connor |
| June 10 | The Last Hurrah | Edwin O'Connor |
| June 17 | The Last Hurrah | Edwin O'Connor |
| June 24 | The Last Hurrah | Edwin O'Connor |
| July 1 | The Last Hurrah | Edwin O'Connor |
| July 8 | The Last Hurrah | Edwin O'Connor |
| July 15 | The Last Hurrah | Edwin O'Connor |
| July 22 | The Last Hurrah | Edwin O'Connor |
| July 29 | The Last Hurrah | Edwin O'Connor |
| August 5 | The Last Hurrah | Edwin O'Connor |
| August 12 | Don't Go Near the Water | William Brinkley |
| August 19 | Don't Go Near the Water | William Brinkley |
| August 26 | Don't Go Near the Water | William Brinkley |
| September 2 | Don't Go Near the Water | William Brinkley |
| September 9 | Don't Go Near the Water | William Brinkley |
| September 16 | Don't Go Near the Water | William Brinkley |
| September 23 | Don't Go Near the Water | William Brinkley |
| September 30 | Don't Go Near the Water | William Brinkley |
| October 7 | Don't Go Near the Water | William Brinkley |
| October 14 | Don't Go Near the Water | William Brinkley |
| October 21 | Don't Go Near the Water | William Brinkley |
| October 28 | Don't Go Near the Water | William Brinkley |
| November 4 | Don't Go Near the Water | William Brinkley |
| November 11 | Don't Go Near the Water | William Brinkley |
| November 18 | Don't Go Near the Water | William Brinkley |
| November 25 | Peyton Place | Grace Metalious |
| December 2 | Peyton Place | Grace Metalious |
| December 9 | Peyton Place | Grace Metalious |
| December 16 | Peyton Place | Grace Metalious |
| December 23 | Peyton Place | Grace Metalious |
| December 30 | Peyton Place | Grace Metalious |

== Nonfiction ==
The following list ranks the number-one best-selling nonfiction books.

| Date | Book | Author |
|---|---|---|
| January 1 | Gift from the Sea | Anne Morrow Lindbergh |
| January 8 | Gift from the Sea | Anne Morrow Lindbergh |
| January 15 | Gift from the Sea | Anne Morrow Lindbergh |
| January 22 | Gift from the Sea | Anne Morrow Lindbergh |
| January 29 | Gift from the Sea | Anne Morrow Lindbergh |
| February 5 | Gift from the Sea | Anne Morrow Lindbergh |
| February 12 | Gift from the Sea | Anne Morrow Lindbergh |
| February 19 | Gift from the Sea | Anne Morrow Lindbergh |
| February 26 | Gift from the Sea | Anne Morrow Lindbergh |
| March 4 | The Search for Bridey Murphy | Morey Bernstein |
| March 11 | The Search for Bridey Murphy | Morey Bernstein |
| March 18 | The Search for Bridey Murphy | Morey Bernstein |
| March 25 | The Search for Bridey Murphy | Morey Bernstein |
| April 1 | The Search for Bridey Murphy | Morey Bernstein |
| April 8 | The Search for Bridey Murphy | Morey Bernstein |
| April 15 | The Search for Bridey Murphy | Morey Bernstein |
| April 22 | The Search for Bridey Murphy | Morey Bernstein |
| April 29 | The Search for Bridey Murphy | Morey Bernstein |
| May 6 | The Search for Bridey Murphy | Morey Bernstein |
| May 13 | The Search for Bridey Murphy | Morey Bernstein |
| May 20 | The Birth of Britain | Winston Churchill |
| May 27 | The Birth of Britain | Winston Churchill |
| June 3 | The Birth of Britain | Winston Churchill |
| June 10 | The Birth of Britain | Winston Churchill |
| June 17 | The Birth of Britain | Winston Churchill |
| June 24 | The Birth of Britain | Winston Churchill |
| July 1 | The Birth of Britain | Winston Churchill |
| July 8 | The Birth of Britain | Winston Churchill |
| July 15 | Arthritis and Common Sense | Dale Alexander |
| July 22 | The Birth of Britain | Winston Churchill |
| July 29 | Arthritis and Common Sense | Dale Alexander |
| August 5 | Eisenhower: The Inside Story | Robert J. Donovan |
| August 12 | Eisenhower: The Inside Story | Robert J. Donovan |
| August 19 | Eisenhower: The Inside Story | Robert J. Donovan |
| August 26 | Eisenhower: The Inside Story | Robert J. Donovan |
| September 2 | Eisenhower: The Inside Story | Robert J. Donovan |
| September 9 | Eisenhower: The Inside Story | Robert J. Donovan |
| September 16 | Eisenhower: The Inside Story | Robert J. Donovan |
| September 23 | Eisenhower: The Inside Story | Robert J. Donovan |
| September 30 | Eisenhower: The Inside Story | Robert J. Donovan |
| October 7 | Eisenhower: The Inside Story | Robert J. Donovan |
| October 14 | Eisenhower: The Inside Story | Robert J. Donovan |
| October 21 | The Nun's Story | Kathryn Hulme |
| October 28 | The Nun's Story | Kathryn Hulme |
| November 4 | The Nun's Story | Kathryn Hulme |
| November 11 | The Nun's Story | Kathryn Hulme |
| November 18 | The Nun's Story | Kathryn Hulme |
| November 25 | The Nun's Story | Kathryn Hulme |
| December 2 | The Nun's Story | Kathryn Hulme |
| December 9 | The Nun's Story | Kathryn Hulme |
| December 16 | The Nun's Story | Kathryn Hulme |
| December 23 | The Nun's Story | Kathryn Hulme |
| December 30 | The Nun's Story | Kathryn Hulme |

== See also ==
- Publishers Weekly list of bestselling novels in the United States in the 1950s
