= List of The New York Times number-one books of 1955 =

This is a list of books that topped The New York Times best-seller list in 1955.

== Fiction ==
The following list ranks the number-one best-selling fiction books.

Date	Book	Author
January 2	The View from Pompey's Head	Hamilton Basso
January 9	The View from Pompey's Head	Hamilton Basso
January 16	The View from Pompey's Head	Hamilton Basso
January 23	The View from Pompey's Head	Hamilton Basso
January 30	The View from Pompey's Head	Hamilton Basso
February 6	The View from Pompey's Head	Hamilton Basso
February 13	The View from Pompey's Head	Hamilton Basso
February 20	The View from Pompey's Head	Hamilton Basso
February 27	The View from Pompey's Head	Hamilton Basso
March 6	The View from Pompey's Head	Hamilton Basso
March 13	The View from Pompey's Head	Hamilton Basso
March 20	The View from Pompey's Head	Hamilton Basso
March 27	The View from Pompey's Head	Hamilton Basso
April 3	The View from Pompey's Head	Hamilton Basso
April 10	Sincerely, Willis Wayde	John P. Marquand
April 17	Sincerely, Willis Wayde	John P. Marquand
April 24	Sincerely, Willis Wayde	John P. Marquand
May 1	Sincerely, Willis Wayde	John P. Marquand
May 8	Sincerely, Willis Wayde	John P. Marquand
May 15	Sincerely, Willis Wayde	John P. Marquand
May 22	Bonjour Tristesse	Françoise Sagan
May 29	Bonjour Tristesse	Françoise Sagan
June 5	Bonjour Tristesse	Françoise Sagan
June 12	Bonjour Tristesse	Françoise Sagan
June 19	Bonjour Tristesse	Françoise Sagan
June 26	Bonjour Tristesse	Françoise Sagan
July 3	Something of Value	Robert Ruark
July 10	Bonjour Tristesse	Françoise Sagan
July 17	Something of Value	Robert Ruark
July 24	Bonjour Tristesse	Françoise Sagan
July 31	Bonjour Tristesse	Françoise Sagan
August 7	Bonjour Tristesse	Françoise Sagan
August 14	Bonjour Tristesse	Françoise Sagan
August 21	Bonjour Tristesse	Françoise Sagan
August 28	Auntie Mame	Patrick Dennis
September 4	Auntie Mame	Patrick Dennis
September 11	Auntie Mame	Patrick Dennis
September 18	Auntie Mame	Patrick Dennis
September 25	Auntie Mame	Patrick Dennis
October 2	Marjorie Morningstar	Herman Wouk
October 9	Marjorie Morningstar	Herman Wouk
October 16	Marjorie Morningstar	Herman Wouk
October 23	Marjorie Morningstar	Herman Wouk
October 30	Marjorie Morningstar	Herman Wouk
November 6	Marjorie Morningstar	Herman Wouk
November 13	Marjorie Morningstar	Herman Wouk
November 20	Marjorie Morningstar	Herman Wouk
November 27	Marjorie Morningstar	Herman Wouk
December 4	Marjorie Morningstar	Herman Wouk
December 11	Marjorie Morningstar	Herman Wouk
December 18	Marjorie Morningstar	Herman Wouk
December 25	Marjorie Morningstar	Herman Wouk

== Nonfiction ==
The following list ranks the number-one best-selling nonfiction books.

Date	Book	Author
January 2	The Power of Positive Thinking	Norman Vincent Peale
January 9	The Power of Positive Thinking	Norman Vincent Peale
January 16	The Power of Positive Thinking	Norman Vincent Peale
January 23	The Power of Positive Thinking	Norman Vincent Peale
January 30	The Power of Positive Thinking	Norman Vincent Peale
February 6	The Power of Positive Thinking	Norman Vincent Peale
February 13	The Power of Positive Thinking	Norman Vincent Peale
February 20	The Power of Positive Thinking	Norman Vincent Peale
February 27	The Power of Positive Thinking	Norman Vincent Peale
March 6	The Power of Positive Thinking	Norman Vincent Peale
March 13	The Power of Positive Thinking	Norman Vincent Peale
March 20	The Power of Positive Thinking	Norman Vincent Peale
March 27	The Power of Positive Thinking	Norman Vincent Peale
April 3	The Power of Positive Thinking	Norman Vincent Peale
April 10	The Power of Positive Thinking	Norman Vincent Peale
April 17	Gift from the Sea	Anne Morrow Lindbergh
April 24	Gift from the Sea	Anne Morrow Lindbergh
May 1	Gift from the Sea	Anne Morrow Lindbergh
May 8	Gift from the Sea	Anne Morrow Lindbergh
May 15	Gift from the Sea	Anne Morrow Lindbergh
May 22	Gift from the Sea	Anne Morrow Lindbergh
May 29	Gift from the Sea	Anne Morrow Lindbergh
June 5	Gift from the Sea	Anne Morrow Lindbergh
June 12	Gift from the Sea	Anne Morrow Lindbergh
June 19	Gift from the Sea	Anne Morrow Lindbergh
June 26	Gift from the Sea	Anne Morrow Lindbergh
July 3	Gift from the Sea	Anne Morrow Lindbergh
July 10	Gift from the Sea	Anne Morrow Lindbergh
July 17	Gift from the Sea	Anne Morrow Lindbergh
July 24	Gift from the Sea	Anne Morrow Lindbergh
July 31	Gift from the Sea	Anne Morrow Lindbergh
August 7	Gift from the Sea	Anne Morrow Lindbergh
August 14	Gift from the Sea	Anne Morrow Lindbergh
August 21	Gift from the Sea	Anne Morrow Lindbergh
August 28	Gift from the Sea	Anne Morrow Lindbergh
September 4	Gift from the Sea	Anne Morrow Lindbergh
September 11	Gift from the Sea	Anne Morrow Lindbergh
September 18	Gift from the Sea	Anne Morrow Lindbergh
September 25	Gift from the Sea	Anne Morrow Lindbergh
October 2	Gift from the Sea	Anne Morrow Lindbergh
October 9	Gift from the Sea	Anne Morrow Lindbergh
October 16	Gift from the Sea	Anne Morrow Lindbergh
October 23	Gift from the Sea	Anne Morrow Lindbergh
October 30	Gift from the Sea	Anne Morrow Lindbergh
November 6	Gift from the Sea	Anne Morrow Lindbergh
November 13	Gift from the Sea	Anne Morrow Lindbergh
November 20	Gift from the Sea	Anne Morrow Lindbergh
November 27	Gift from the Sea	Anne Morrow Lindbergh
December 4	Gift from the Sea	Anne Morrow Lindbergh
December 11	Gift from the Sea	Anne Morrow Lindbergh
December 18	Gift from the Sea	Anne Morrow Lindbergh
December 25	Gift from the Sea	Anne Morrow Lindbergh

== See also ==
- Publishers Weekly list of bestselling novels in the United States in the 1950s
