= List of The New York Times number-one books of 1983 =

The American daily newspaper The New York Times publishes multiple weekly lists ranking the best-selling books in the United States.

== Fiction ==
The following list ranks the number-one best-selling fiction books, in the hardcover fiction category.

Date	Book	Author
January 2	Space	James Michener
January 9	Space	James Michener
January 16	Space	James Michener
January 23	Space	James Michener
January 30	Space	James Michener
February 6	Space	James Michener
February 13	Space	James Michener
February 20	Mistral's Daughter	Judith Krantz
February 27	Space	James Michener
March 6	Space	James Michener
March 13	Space	James Michener
March 20	The Little Drummer Girl	John le Carré
March 27	The Little Drummer Girl	John le Carré
April 3	The Little Drummer Girl	John le Carré
April 10	The Little Drummer Girl	John le Carré
April 17	The Little Drummer Girl	John le Carré
April 24	The Little Drummer Girl	John le Carré
May 1	The Little Drummer Girl	John le Carré
May 8	The Little Drummer Girl	John le Carré
May 15	The Little Drummer Girl	John le Carré
May 22	The Little Drummer Girl	John le Carré
May 29	The Little Drummer Girl	John le Carré
June 5	The Little Drummer Girl	John le Carré
June 12	Star Wars: Return of the Jedi	Joan D. Vinge
June 19	Star Wars: Return of the Jedi	Joan D. Vinge
June 26	Star Wars: Return of the Jedi	Joan D. Vinge
July 3	Star Wars: Return of the Jedi	Joan D. Vinge
July 10	Star Wars: Return of the Jedi	Joan D. Vinge
July 17	Star Wars: Return of the Jedi	Joan D. Vinge
July 24	Star Wars: Return of the Jedi	Joan D. Vinge
July 31	Star Wars: Return of the Jedi	Joan D. Vinge
August 7	The Name of the Rose	Umberto Eco
August 14	The Name of the Rose	Umberto Eco
August 21	The Name of the Rose	Umberto Eco
August 28	The Name of the Rose	Umberto Eco
September 4	The Name of the Rose	Umberto Eco
September 11	Poland	James Michener
September 18	Poland	James Michener
September 25	Poland	James Michener
October 2	Poland	James Michener
October 9	Poland	James Michener
October 16	Poland	James Michener
October 23	Poland	James Michener
October 30	Poland	James Michener
November 6	Poland	James Michener
November 13	Pet Sematary	Stephen King
November 20	Pet Sematary	Stephen King
November 27	Pet Sematary	Stephen King
December 4	Pet Sematary	Stephen King
December 11	Pet Sematary	Stephen King
December 18	Pet Sematary	Stephen King
December 25	Poland	James Michener

== Nonfiction ==
The following list ranks the number-one best-selling nonfiction books, in the hardcover nonfiction category.

Date	Book	Author
January 2	And More by Andy Rooney	Andrew A. Rooney
January 9	And More by Andy Rooney	Andrew A. Rooney
January 16	And More by Andy Rooney	Andrew A. Rooney
January 23	Jane Fonda's Workout Book	Jane Fonda
January 30	Jane Fonda's Workout Book	Jane Fonda
February 6	Jane Fonda's Workout Book	Jane Fonda
February 13	Jane Fonda's Workout Book	Jane Fonda
February 20	Jane Fonda's Workout Book	Jane Fonda
February 27	Megatrends	John Naisbitt
March 6	Jane Fonda's Workout Book	Jane Fonda
March 13	Megatrends	John Naisbitt
March 20	Megatrends	John Naisbitt
March 27	Megatrends	John Naisbitt
April 3	Megatrends	John Naisbitt
April 10	Megatrends	John Naisbitt
April 17	Megatrends	John Naisbitt
April 24	In Search of Excellence	Thomas J. Peters and Robert H. Waterman Jr
May 1	In Search of Excellence	Thomas J. Peters and Robert H. Waterman Jr
May 8	In Search of Excellence	Thomas J. Peters and Robert H. Waterman Jr
May 15	In Search of Excellence	Thomas J. Peters and Robert H. Waterman Jr
May 22	In Search of Excellence	Thomas J. Peters and Robert H. Waterman Jr
May 29	In Search of Excellence	Thomas J. Peters and Robert H. Waterman Jr
June 5	In Search of Excellence	Thomas J. Peters and Robert H. Waterman Jr
June 12	In Search of Excellence	Thomas J. Peters and Robert H. Waterman Jr
June 19	In Search of Excellence	Thomas J. Peters and Robert H. Waterman Jr
June 26	In Search of Excellence	Thomas J. Peters and Robert H. Waterman Jr
July 3	Megatrends	John Naisbitt
July 10	In Search of Excellence	Thomas J. Peters and Robert H. Waterman Jr
July 17	In Search of Excellence	Thomas J. Peters and Robert H. Waterman Jr
July 24	In Search of Excellence	Thomas J. Peters and Robert H. Waterman Jr
July 31	In Search of Excellence	Thomas J. Peters and Robert H. Waterman Jr
August 7	In Search of Excellence	Thomas J. Peters and Robert H. Waterman Jr
August 14	In Search of Excellence	Thomas J. Peters and Robert H. Waterman Jr
August 21	In Search of Excellence	Thomas J. Peters and Robert H. Waterman Jr
August 28	In Search of Excellence	Thomas J. Peters and Robert H. Waterman Jr
September 4	In Search of Excellence	Thomas J. Peters and Robert H. Waterman Jr
September 11	In Search of Excellence	Thomas J. Peters and Robert H. Waterman Jr
September 18	In Search of Excellence	Thomas J. Peters and Robert H. Waterman Jr
September 25	In Search of Excellence	Thomas J. Peters and Robert H. Waterman Jr
October 2	In Search of Excellence	Thomas J. Peters and Robert H. Waterman Jr
October 9	In Search of Excellence	Thomas J. Peters and Robert H. Waterman Jr
October 16	In Search of Excellence	Thomas J. Peters and Robert H. Waterman Jr
October 23	Motherhood: The Second Oldest Profession	Erma Bombeck
October 30	Motherhood: The Second Oldest Profession	Erma Bombeck
November 6	Motherhood: The Second Oldest Profession	Erma Bombeck
November 13	Motherhood: The Second Oldest Profession	Erma Bombeck
November 20	Motherhood: The Second Oldest Profession	Erma Bombeck
November 27	Motherhood: The Second Oldest Profession	Erma Bombeck
December 4	Motherhood: The Second Oldest Profession	Erma Bombeck
December 11	Motherhood: The Second Oldest Profession	Erma Bombeck
December 18	Motherhood: The Second Oldest Profession	Erma Bombeck
December 25	Motherhood: The Second Oldest Profession	Erma Bombeck

== See also ==
- Publishers Weekly list of bestselling novels in the United States in the 1980s
