= List of The New York Times number-one books of 1993 =

The American daily newspaper The New York Times publishes multiple weekly lists ranking the best selling books in the United States.

== Fiction ==
The following list ranks the number-one best selling fiction books, in the hardcover fiction category.

Date	Book	Author
January 3	Dolores Claiborne	Stephen King
January 10	Dolores Claiborne	Stephen King
January 17	Dolores Claiborne	Stephen King
January 24	Dragon Tears	Dean Koontz
January 31	The Bridges of Madison County	Robert James Waller
February 7	The Bridges of Madison County	Robert James Waller
February 14	The Bridges of Madison County	Robert James Waller
February 21	The Bridges of Madison County	Robert James Waller
February 28	The Bridges of Madison County	Robert James Waller
March 7	The Bridges of Madison County	Robert James Waller
March 14	The Bridges of Madison County	Robert James Waller
March 21	The Client	John Grisham
March 28	The Client	John Grisham
April 4	The Client	John Grisham
April 11	The Client	John Grisham
April 18	The Bridges of Madison County	Robert James Waller
April 25	The Bridges of Madison County	Robert James Waller
May 2	The Bridges of Madison County	Robert James Waller
May 9	The Bridges of Madison County	Robert James Waller
May 16	The Bridges of Madison County	Robert James Waller
May 23	The Bridges of Madison County	Robert James Waller
May 30	The Bridges of Madison County	Robert James Waller
June 6	The Bridges of Madison County	Robert James Waller
June 13	The Bridges of Madison County	Robert James Waller
June 20	The Bridges of Madison County	Robert James Waller
June 27	The Bridges of Madison County	Robert James Waller
July 4	The Bridges of Madison County	Robert James Waller
July 11	The Bridges of Madison County	Robert James Waller
July 18	The Bridges of Madison County	Robert James Waller
July 25	The Bridges of Madison County	Robert James Waller
August 1	The Bridges of Madison County	Robert James Waller
August 8	The Bridges of Madison County	Robert James Waller
August 15	The Bridges of Madison County	Robert James Waller
August 22	The Bridges of Madison County	Robert James Waller
August 29	Without Remorse	Tom Clancy
September 5	Without Remorse	Tom Clancy
September 12	The Bridges of Madison County	Robert James Waller
September 19	The Bridges of Madison County	Robert James Waller
September 26	The Bridges of Madison County	Robert James Waller
October 3	The Bridges of Madison County	Robert James Waller
October 10	The Bridges of Madison County	Robert James Waller
October 17	The Bridges of Madison County	Robert James Waller
October 24	The Bridges of Madison County	Robert James Waller
October 31	The Bridges of Madison County	Robert James Waller
November 7	The Bridges of Madison County	Robert James Waller
November 14	Slow Waltz in Cedar Bend	Robert James Waller
November 21	Slow Waltz in Cedar Bend	Robert James Waller
November 28	Slow Waltz in Cedar Bend	Robert James Waller
December 5	Slow Waltz in Cedar Bend	Robert James Waller
December 12	Slow Waltz in Cedar Bend	Robert James Waller
December 19	Slow Waltz in Cedar Bend	Robert James Waller
December 26	Slow Waltz in Cedar Bend	Robert James Waller

== Nonfiction ==
The following list ranks the number-one best selling nonfiction books, in the hardcover nonfiction category.

Date	Book	Author
January 3	The Way Things Ought to Be	Rush H. Limbaugh
January 10	The Way Things Ought to Be	Rush H. Limbaugh
January 17	The Way Things Ought to Be	Rush H. Limbaugh
January 24	The Way Things Ought to Be	Rush H. Limbaugh
January 31	The Way Things Ought to Be	Rush H. Limbaugh
February 7	The Way Things Ought to Be	Rush H. Limbaugh
February 14	The Way Things Ought to Be	Rush H. Limbaugh
February 21	The Way Things Ought to Be	Rush H. Limbaugh
February 28	The Way Things Ought to Be	Rush H. Limbaugh
March 7	The Way Things Ought to Be	Rush H. Limbaugh
March 14	Healing and the Mind	Bill Moyers
March 21	Healing and the Mind	Bill Moyers
March 28	Healing and the Mind	Bill Moyers
April 4	Healing and the Mind	Bill Moyers
April 11	Healing and the Mind	Bill Moyers
April 18	Healing and the Mind	Bill Moyers
April 25	Women Who Run with the Wolves	Clarissa Pinkola Estes
May 2	Women Who Run with the Wolves	Clarissa Pinkola Estes
May 9	Women Who Run with the Wolves	Clarissa Pinkola Estes
May 16	Women Who Run with the Wolves	Clarissa Pinkola Estes
May 23	Women Who Run with the Wolves	Clarissa Pinkola Estes
May 30	Women Who Run with the Wolves	Clarissa Pinkola Estes
June 6	Women Who Run with the Wolves	Clarissa Pinkola Estes
June 13	Women Who Run with the Wolves	Clarissa Pinkola Estes
June 20	Women Who Run with the Wolves	Clarissa Pinkola Estes
June 27	The Way Things Ought to Be	Rush H. Limbaugh
July 4	The Way Things Ought to Be	Rush H. Limbaugh
July 11	The Way Things Ought to Be	Rush H. Limbaugh
July 18	Days of Grace	Arthur Ashe and Arnold Rampersad
July 25	Women Who Run with the Wolves	Clarissa Pinkola Estes
August 1	Women Who Run with the Wolves	Clarissa Pinkola Estes
August 8	Women Who Run with the Wolves	Clarissa Pinkola Estes
August 15	Women Who Run with the Wolves	Clarissa Pinkola Estes
August 22	Women Who Run with the Wolves	Clarissa Pinkola Estes
August 29	Women Who Run with the Wolves	Clarissa Pinkola Estes
September 5	Embraced by the Light	Betty J. Eadie with Curtis Taylor
September 12	Embraced by the Light	Betty J. Eadie with Curtis Taylor
September 19	Seinlanguage	Jerry Seinfeld
September 26	Seinlanguage	Jerry Seinfeld
October 3	Seinlanguage	Jerry Seinfeld
October 10	Seinlanguage	Jerry Seinfeld
October 17	Seinlanguage	Jerry Seinfeld
October 24	Private Parts	Howard Stern
October 31	Private Parts	Howard Stern
November 7	Private Parts	Howard Stern
November 14	Private Parts	Howard Stern
November 21	See, I Told You So	Rush H. Limbaugh
November 28	See, I Told You So	Rush H. Limbaugh
December 5	See, I Told You So	Rush H. Limbaugh
December 12	See, I Told You So	Rush H. Limbaugh
December 19	See, I Told You So	Rush H. Limbaugh
December 26	See, I Told You So	Rush H. Limbaugh

== See also ==
- Publishers Weekly list of bestselling novels in the United States in the 1990s
