= The Silver Chalice (novel) =

1952 American novel by Thomas B. Costain

- Author: Thomas B. Costain
- Illustrator: Paul Laune
- Language: English
- Genre: Historical novel
- Publisher: Doubleday & Company
- Publication date: July 1952
- Publication place: United States
- Media type: Print (hardcover)
- Pages: 533
- ISBN: 0-385-04429-1
- OCLC: 964407

The Silver Chalice is a 1952 English language historical novel by Thomas B. Costain. It is the fictional story of the making of a silver chalice to hold the Holy Grail (itself here conflated with the Holy Chalice) and includes 1st century biblical and historical figures: Luke, Joseph of Arimathea, Simon Magus and his companion Helena, and the apostle Peter.

The story was inspired by the archeological discovery of a 1st-century silver chalice in Antioch (see Antioch Chalice). It is in effect a prequel to the Arthurian Legend, where the search for the Holy Grail plays a conspicuous part.

Two years after its publication, Warner Bros. released a feature adaptation of the book. The film starred Paul Newman, in his first studio role, as Basil the craftsman.

First published in 1952, this classic recounts the story of Basil, a young silversmith, who is commissioned by Luke the Evangelist, a disciple of Christ and biographer of the Apostle Paul, to fashion a holder for the cup Jesus used at the Last Supper.

The Silver Chalice was a top best-selling fiction title of 1953 in the United States, atop The New York Times Best Seller list from September 7, 1952 to March 8, 1953, and remaining 64 weeks on the list until October 25, 1953.

== Plot introduction ==
The Silver Chalice takes place in Judea and other parts of the Roman Empire shortly after the death of Jesus. A young man, Basil, is adopted by a rich man, but loses his fortune when his father dies and his uncle defrauds him, claiming he was purchased as a slave, and sells him. As a slave, he survives by working as an artist and silversmith. He gains his freedom, becomes a Christian and is commissioned to create an outer covering for the cup Jesus drank from at The Last Supper.

The plot of The Silver Chalice centers on the Grail — the cup from which Christ drank at the Last Supper. Tired of “all the Arthurian tripe about the Holy Grail,” Costain imagined his own version of the story. Joseph of Arimathea hires Basil of Antioch, a lowborn artisan, to fashion a beautiful silver casing to hold the plain original cup that Jesus used. The casing is to be decorated with the faces of Jesus and the twelve Apostles. To fulfill the commission, Basil travels throughout the ancient Mediterranean world to meet these men and those who knew them intimately.

== Reception ==
=== Positive ===
The Silver Chalice was well received when it was published in 1952. The book was on the New York Times Best Seller List from September 7, 1952 to October 25, 1953 for a total of 64 weeks. It was near the top of that list for 6 months.

Also in 1953, Kirkus Reviews said:

Mr. Costain's best book of fiction, and one that will put out a strong bid to rival The Robe in success with that market. The subject is an illusive one that has been approached tentatively through the centuries -- the mystery of the holy grail...Occasional pandering to modern taste weakens the fundamental values, perhaps, but insures the larger market. A sure best seller.

After the author's death in 1965, The Canadian Book Review Annual said that:

There are a number of anachronisms but, by and large, the novel is a creative introduction to the period and worth a reprint.
