= Hawaii (novel) =

Novel by James A. Michener

- First edition
- Author: James A. Michener
- Language: English
- Publisher: Random House
- Publication date: November 20, 1959
- Publication place: United States
- Media type: print
- Pages: 937pp.

Hawaii is a novel by James A. Michener published in 1959, the year that Hawaii became the 50th U.S. state. It has been translated into 32 languages.

The novel is regarded to be a well researched work historical novel though the narrative about early Polynesian inhabitants is based more on folklore than anthropological and archaeological sources., and some of the events are fictionalized. It is written in episodic format, like many of Michener's works, and narrates the stories of the original Hawaiians who sailed to the islands from Bora Bora, the early American missionaries and merchants, and the Chinese and Japanese immigrants who traveled to work and seek their fortunes in Hawaii. The story begins with the formation of the islands themselves millions of years ago and ends in the mid-1950s. Each section explores the experiences of different groups of arrivals.

== Development ==
For Hawaiian history, Michener researched at the Hawaiian-Mission Historical Library and consulted experts on island history, volcanoes, botany, pineapples, and Chinese culture. His technical adviser, noted Hawaiian scholar Clarice B. Taylor, explained customs, language, family names, and nuances of Hawaiian culture to Michener. Taylor said, "The things you want are not in books...all this material you want has to come out of my head. A book cannot tell you how a Polynesian acts or how he talks."

Several characters in the novel are inspired by actual individuals. The character Reverend Abner Hale is a caricature of true-life missionary Hiram Bingham I. Asa Thurston was also a model for a missionary character in the novel. Chinn Ho, the "Chinese Rockefeller", was popularly considered to be the inspiration for the character Hong Kong Kee.

== Plot ==
The novel tells the history of Hawaiian Islands from the creation of the isles to the time they became an American state through the viewpoints of selected characters who represent their ethnic and cultural groups in the story (e.g. the Kee family represents the viewpoint of Chinese-Hawaiians). Most of the chapters cover the arrivals of different peoples to the islands. With the exception of Chapter 1, all the chapters are of standalone novel or novella length.

1. From the Boundless Deep describes the creation of the Hawaiian land from volcanic activity. It goes into flavorful detail describing such things as primary succession taking root on the island to life finally blooming.
2. From the Sunswept Lagoon begins on the island of Bora Bora, where many people, including King Tamatoa and his brother Teroro, are upset with the neighboring isles of Havaiki, Tahiti etc. because they are trying to force the Bora Borans to give up their old gods, Tāne and Ta'aroa, and start worshiping 'Oro, the fire god, who constantly demands human sacrifices. Tamatoa suggests to his brother and friends that they should migrate to some other place where they might find religious freedom. After finally agreeing to this plan, his brother secretly sets fire to Havaiki to take revenge for the human sacrifices they have been demanding from Bora Borans. Later they take the canoe Wait for the West Wind and sail to Hawaii. Later some return to Bora Bora to bring back with them some women and children and an idol of the volcano goddess, Pele.
3. From the Farm of Bitterness follows the journey of the first Christian missionaries to Hawaii in the 1800s and their influence over Hawaiian culture and customs. Many of the missionaries become founding families in the islands, including the Hales and Whipples.
4. From the Starving Village covers the immigration of Chinese to work on the pineapple and sugarcane plantations. The patriarch of the Kee family contracts leprosy (a.k.a. the "Chinese sickness") and is sent to the leper colony in Molokai. Chapter 4 includes a fictionalized version of 1893 historical events known as the overthrow of the Kingdom of Hawaii.
5. From the Inland Sea focuses on Japanese workers brought to the islands to replace Chinese laborers; the latter begin to set up their own businesses. It also covers the bombing of Pearl Harbor.
6. The Golden Men summarizes the changes in Hawaiian culture and economics based on the intermarriages of various groups in the islands.

== Cinematic adaptations ==
The film Hawaii (1966), starring Max von Sydow and Julie Andrews, was released in 1966. The film focused on the book's third chapter, "From the Farm of Bitterness", which covered the settlement of the island kingdom by its first American missionaries.

A sequel, The Hawaiians (1970), starring Charlton Heston, covered subsequent chapters of the book, including the arrival of the Chinese and Japanese and the growth of the plantations.
