= Publishers Weekly list of bestselling novels in the United States in the 1940s =

This is a list of bestselling novels in the United States in the 1940s, as determined by Publishers Weekly. The list features the most popular novels of each year from 1940 through 1949.

The standards set for inclusion in the lists – which, for example, lead to the exclusion of the novels in the Harry Potter series from the lists for the 1990s and 2000s – are currently unknown.

== 1940 ==
1. How Green Was My Valley by Richard Llewellyn
2. Kitty Foyle by Christopher Morley
3. Mrs. Miniver by Jan Struther
4. For Whom the Bell Tolls by Ernest Hemingway
5. The Nazarene by Sholem Asch
6. Stars on the Sea by F. Van Wyck Mason
7. Oliver Wiswell by Kenneth Roberts
8. The Grapes of Wrath by John Steinbeck
9. Night in Bombay by Louis Bromfield
10. The Family by Nina Fedorova

== 1941 ==
1. The Keys of the Kingdom by A. J. Cronin
2. Random Harvest by James Hilton
3. This Above All by Eric Knight
4. The Sun Is My Undoing by Marguerite Steen
5. For Whom the Bell Tolls by Ernest Hemingway
6. Oliver Wiswell by Kenneth Roberts
7. H. M. Pulham, Esquire by John P. Marquand
8. Mr. and Mrs. Cugat by Isabel Scott Rorick
9. Saratoga Trunk by Edna Ferber
10. Windswept by Mary Ellen Chase

== 1942 ==
1. The Song of Bernadette by Franz Werfel
2. The Moon Is Down by John Steinbeck
3. Dragon Seed by Pearl S. Buck
4. And Now Tomorrow by Rachel Field
5. Drivin' Woman by Elizabeth Pickett
6. Windswept by Mary Ellen Chase
7. The Robe by Lloyd C. Douglas
8. The Sun Is My Undoing by Marguerite Steen
9. Kings Row by Henry Bellamann
10. The Keys of the Kingdom by A. J. Cronin

== 1943 ==
1. The Robe by Lloyd C. Douglas
2. The Valley of Decision by Marcia Davenport
3. So Little Time by John P. Marquand
4. A Tree Grows in Brooklyn by Betty Smith
5. The Human Comedy by William Saroyan
6. Mrs. Parkington by Louis Bromfield
7. The Apostle by Sholem Asch
8. Hungry Hill by Daphne du Maurier
9. The Forest and the Fort by Hervey Allen
10. The Song of Bernadette by Franz Werfel

== 1944 ==
1. Strange Fruit by Lillian Smith
2. The Robe by Lloyd C. Douglas
3. A Tree Grows in Brooklyn by Betty Smith
4. Forever Amber by Kathleen Winsor
5. The Razor's Edge by W. Somerset Maugham
6. The Green Years by A. J. Cronin
7. Leave Her to Heaven by Ben Ames Williams
8. Green Dolphin Street by Elizabeth Goudge
9. A Bell for Adano by John Hersey
10. The Apostle by Sholem Asch

== 1945 ==
1. Forever Amber by Kathleen Winsor
2. The Robe by Lloyd C. Douglas
3. The Black Rose by Thomas B. Costain
4. The White Tower by James Ramsey Ullman
5. Cass Timberlane by Sinclair Lewis
6. A Lion Is in the Streets by Adria Locke Langley
7. So Well Remembered by James Hilton
8. Captain from Castile by Samuel Shellabarger
9. Earth and High Heaven by Gwethalyn Graham
10. Immortal Wife by Irving Stone

== 1946 ==
1. The King's General by Daphne du Maurier
2. This Side of Innocence by Taylor Caldwell
3. The River Road by Frances Parkinson Keyes
4. The Miracle of the Bells by Russell Janney
5. The Hucksters by Frederic Wakeman, Sr.
6. The Foxes of Harrow by Frank Yerby
7. Arch of Triumph by Erich Maria Remarque
8. The Black Rose by Thomas B. Costain
9. B.F.'s Daughter by John P. Marquand
10. The Snake Pit by Mary Jane Ward

== 1947 ==
1. The Miracle of the Bells by Russell Janney
2. The Moneyman by Thomas B. Costain
3. Gentleman's Agreement by Laura Z. Hobson
4. Lydia Bailey by Kenneth Roberts
5. The Vixens by Frank Yerby
6. The Wayward Bus by John Steinbeck
7. House Divided by Ben Ames Williams
8. Kingsblood Royal by Sinclair Lewis
9. East Side, West Side by Marcia Davenport
10. Prince of Foxes by Samuel Shellabarger

== 1948 ==
1. The Big Fisherman by Lloyd C. Douglas
2. The Naked and the Dead by Norman Mailer
3. Dinner at Antoine's by Frances Parkinson Keyes
4. The Bishop's Mantle by Agnes Sligh Turnbull
5. Tomorrow Will Be Better by Betty Smith
6. The Golden Hawk by Frank Yerby
7. Raintree County by Ross Lockridge Jr.
8. Shannon's Way by A. J. Cronin
9. Pilgrim's Inn by Elizabeth Goudge
10. The Young Lions by Irwin Shaw

== 1949 ==
1. The Egyptian by Mika Waltari
2. The Big Fisherman by Lloyd C. Douglas
3. Mary by Sholem Asch
4. A Rage to Live by John O'Hara
5. Point of No Return by John P. Marquand
6. Dinner at Antoine's by Frances Parkinson Keyes
7. High Towers by Thomas B. Costain
8. Cutlass Empire by F. Van Wyck Mason
9. Pride's Castle by Frank Yerby
10. Father of the Bride by Edward Streeter
