= The Treasure of Pleasant Valley =

1955 novel

- Author: Frank Yerby
- Language: English
- Genre: Historical
- Publisher: Dial Press
- Publication date: 1955
- Publication place: United States
- Media type: Print
- Pages: 348

The Treasure of Pleasant Valley is a 1955 historical novel by the American writer Frank Yerby. It was published by Dial Press. Yerby had already produced several bestsellers set in nineteenth century America including The Foxes of Harrow, A Woman Called Fancy and Benton's Row.

== Synopsis ==
During the 1840s Bruce Harkness, a young southerner, heads west to join the California Gold Rush. He enjoys a series of adventures and winds up in San Francisco after encountering the beautiful Juana. He ultimately makes a success as a farmer rather than a gold prospector.

== Bibliography ==
- Beverly, Edward Joseph. Chasing the Sun: A Reader's Guide to Novels Set in the American West. Sunstone Press, 2008.
- Bonner Jr., John W. Bibliography of Georgia Authors, 1949–1965. University of Georgia Press, 2010.
