= All the Brothers Were Valiant (disambiguation) =

All the Brothers Were Valiant is a 1953 American film.

All the Brothers Were Valiant may also refer to:

- All the Brothers Were Valiant (novel), a 1919 American novel by Ben Ames Williams
- All the Brothers Were Valiant (1923 film), an American silent film
