= Publishers Weekly list of bestselling novels in the United States in the 1950s =

This is a list of bestselling novels in the United States in the 1950s, as determined by Publishers Weekly. The list features the most popular novels of each year from 1950 through 1959.

The standards set for inclusion in the lists – which, for example, led to the exclusion of the novels in the Harry Potter series from the lists for the 1990s and 2000s – are currently unknown.

== 1950 ==
1. The Cardinal by Henry Morton Robinson
2. Joy Street by Frances Parkinson Keyes
3. Across the River and into the Trees by Ernest Hemingway
4. The Wall by John Hersey
5. Star Money by Kathleen Winsor
6. The Parasites by Daphne du Maurier
7. Floodtide by Frank Yerby
8. Jubilee Trail by Gwen Bristow
9. The Adventurer by Mika Waltari
10. The Disenchanted by Budd Schulberg

== 1951 ==
1. From Here to Eternity by James Jones
2. The Caine Mutiny by Herman Wouk
3. Moses by Sholem Asch
4. The Cardinal by Henry Morton Robinson
5. A Woman Called Fancy by Frank Yerby
6. The Cruel Sea by Nicholas Monsarrat
7. Melville Goodwin, U.S.A. by John P. Marquand
8. Return to Paradise by James A. Michener
9. The Foundling by Cardinal Spellman
10. The Wanderer by Mika Waltari

== 1952 ==
1. The Silver Chalice by Thomas B. Costain
2. The Caine Mutiny by Herman Wouk
3. East of Eden by John Steinbeck
4. My Cousin Rachel by Daphne du Maurier
5. Steamboat Gothic by Frances Parkinson Keyes
6. Giant by Edna Ferber
7. The Old Man and the Sea by Ernest Hemingway
8. The Gown of Glory by Agnes Sligh Turnbull
9. The Saracen Blade by Frank Yerby
10. The Houses in Between by Howard Spring

== 1953 ==
1. The Robe by Lloyd C. Douglas
2. The Silver Chalice by Thomas B. Costain
3. Desirée by Annemarie Selinko
4. Battle Cry by Leon M. Uris
5. From Here to Eternity by James Jones
6. The High and the Mighty by Ernest K. Gann
7. Beyond This Place by A. J. Cronin
8. Time and Time Again by James Hilton
9. Lord Vanity by Samuel Shellabarger
10. The Unconquered by Ben Ames Williams

== 1954 ==
1. Not as a Stranger by Morton Thompson
2. Mary Anne by Daphne du Maurier
3. Love Is Eternal by Irving Stone
4. The Royal Box by Frances Parkinson Keyes
5. The Egyptian by Mika Waltari
6. No Time for Sergeants by Mac Hyman
7. Sweet Thursday by John Steinbeck
8. The View from Pompey's Head by Hamilton Basso
9. Never Victorious, Never Defeated by Taylor Caldwell
10. Benton's Row by Frank Yerby

== 1955 ==
1. Marjorie Morningstar by Herman Wouk
2. Auntie Mame by Patrick Dennis
3. Andersonville by MacKinlay Kantor
4. Bonjour Tristesse by Françoise Sagan
5. The Man in the Gray Flannel Suit by Sloan Wilson
6. Something of Value by Robert Ruark
7. Not as a Stranger by Morton Thompson
8. No Time for Sergeants by Mac Hyman
9. The Tontine by Thomas B. Costain
10. Ten North Frederick by John O'Hara

== 1956 ==
1. Don't Go Near the Water by William Brinkley
2. The Last Hurrah by Edwin O'Connor
3. Peyton Place by Grace Metalious
4. Auntie Mame by Patrick Dennis
5. Eloise by Kay Thompson
6. Andersonville by MacKinlay Kantor
7. A Certain Smile by Françoise Sagan
8. The Tribe That Lost Its Head by Nicholas Monsarrat
9. The Mandarins by Simone de Beauvoir
10. Boon Island by Kenneth Roberts

== 1957 ==
1. By Love Possessed by James Gould Cozzens
2. Peyton Place by Grace Metalious
3. Compulsion by Meyer Levin
4. Rally Round the Flag, Boys! by Max Shulman
5. Blue Camellia by Frances Parkinson Keyes
6. Eloise in Paris by Kay Thompson
7. The Scapegoat by Daphne du Maurier
8. On the Beach by Nevil Shute
9. Below the Salt by Thomas B. Costain
10. Atlas Shrugged by Ayn Rand

== 1958 ==
1. Doctor Zhivago by Boris Pasternak
2. Anatomy of a Murder by Robert Traver
3. Lolita by Vladimir Nabokov
4. Around the World with Auntie Mame by Patrick Dennis
5. From the Terrace by John O'Hara
6. Eloise at Christmastime by Kay Thompson
7. Ice Palace by Edna Ferber
8. The Winthrop Woman by Anya Seton
9. The Enemy Camp by Jerome Weidman
10. Victorine by Frances Parkinson Keyes

== 1959 ==
1. Exodus by Leon Uris
2. Doctor Zhivago by Boris Pasternak
3. Hawaii by James A. Michener
4. Advise and Consent by Allen Drury
5. Lady Chatterley's Lover by D. H. Lawrence
6. The Ugly American by Eugene L. Burdick
7. Dear and Glorious Physician by Taylor Caldwell
8. Lolita by Vladimir Nabokov
9. Mrs. 'Arris Goes to Paris by Paul Gallico
10. Poor No More by Robert Ruark
