= Bride of Liberty =

1954 novel

- Author: Frank Yerby
- Language: English
- Genre: Historical romance
- Publisher: Doubleday
- Publication date: 1954
- Publication place: United States
- Media type: Print
- Pages: 219

Bride of Liberty is a 1954 historical novel by the American writer Frank Yerby. Along with Benton's Row it was received by critics as "third-rate pulp fiction", as part of a general downturn in the reputation of Yerby's novels. It also did not feature on the Publishers Weekly list of bestselling novels which Yerby's works had regularly appeared over the previous few years. It was originally written by Yerby for his own children.

== Synopsis ==
During the American Revolutionary War Polly Knowles, the daughter of a New York Loyalist, remains true to her love Ethan an officer in the Continental Army despite the fact that he is in love with her sister Kathy.

== Bibliography ==
- Bonner Jr., John W. Bibliography of Georgia Authors, 1949-1965. University of Georgia Press, 2010.
- Hill, James Lee. Anti-heroic Perspectives: The Life and Works of Frank Yerby. University of Iowa, 1976.
- Korda, Michael. Making the List: A Cultural History of the American Bestseller, 1900–1999 : as Seen Through the Annual Bestseller Lists of Publishers Weekly. Barnes & Noble Publishing, 2001.
