= Peapod (boat) =

A peapod is a type of small boat traditionally used for nearshore lobstering in Maine, United States. It is a double-ended rowboat usually made of wood. Today they are mainly used as pleasure boats.

== Origin, history, and use ==
Peapods were developed in Maine for lobstering. U.S. government reports from the 19th century record that the peapod was developed on the island of North Haven about 1870. However, Eric Dow, a Maine boat builder, disputed that the peapod's origin could be traced to any particular place in Maine. They were originally known as "double-enders." The peapod's shallow draft enabled navigation of rocky Maine waters where larger boats could not go. Peapods were commonly rowed from a forward-facing standing position.

The peapod's easy maneuverability also made it a favorite among lighthouse keepers.

James "Jimmy" Steele was a well-known builder of peapods. Many of his tools and molds are in the Penobscot Marine Museum collection.

Elisabeth Ogilvie's novels about traditional lobstering communities in Maine make frequent reference to peapods. Younger lobstermen in the novels often fished from peapods, and in The Dawning of the Day, the narrator explained that "boys who fished in fine weather from a peapod would go out with their fathers in the winter weather."

== Design ==
The peapod has a traditional plank-on-frame construction. It is symmetrical from stem to stern. Peapods were traditionally built in different sizes, with fifteen feet being a common length.
