= Yerby =

Yerby is a surname. Notable people with the surname include:

- Alonzo Smythe Yerby (1921–1994), American physician and academic
- Frank Yerby (1916–1991), American writer
- Lorees Yerby (1930–1996), American playwright and filmmaker
- William Yerby (1758–1824), Mississippi state legislator and plantation owner
