= The Saracen Blade (novel) =

1952 novel

- Author: Frank Yerby
- Language: English
- Genre: Historical
- Publisher: Dial Press
- Publication date: 1952
- Publication place: United States
- Media type: Print

The Saracen Blade is a 1952 historical adventure novel by the American writer Frank Yerby. It was ranked ninth on the Publishers Weekly list of bestselling novels in 1952. It is set during the reign of the Holy Roman Emperor Frederick II and follows the adventures of Pierto di Donati, the son of a Sicilian peasant, who is born at almost the same moment as the Emperor.

== Film adaptation ==
In 1954 it was adapted into a film of the same title produced by Hollywood studio Columbia Pictures. Directed by William Castle, it starred Ricardo Montalbán, Betta St. John and Rick Jason.

== Bibliography ==
- Goble, Alan. The Complete Index to Literary Sources in Film. Walter de Gruyter, 1999.
- Korda, Michael. Making the List: A Cultural History of the American Bestseller, 1900–1999 : as Seen Through the Annual Bestseller Lists of Publishers Weekly. Barnes & Noble Publishing, 2001.
