= Across to Singapore =

1928 film

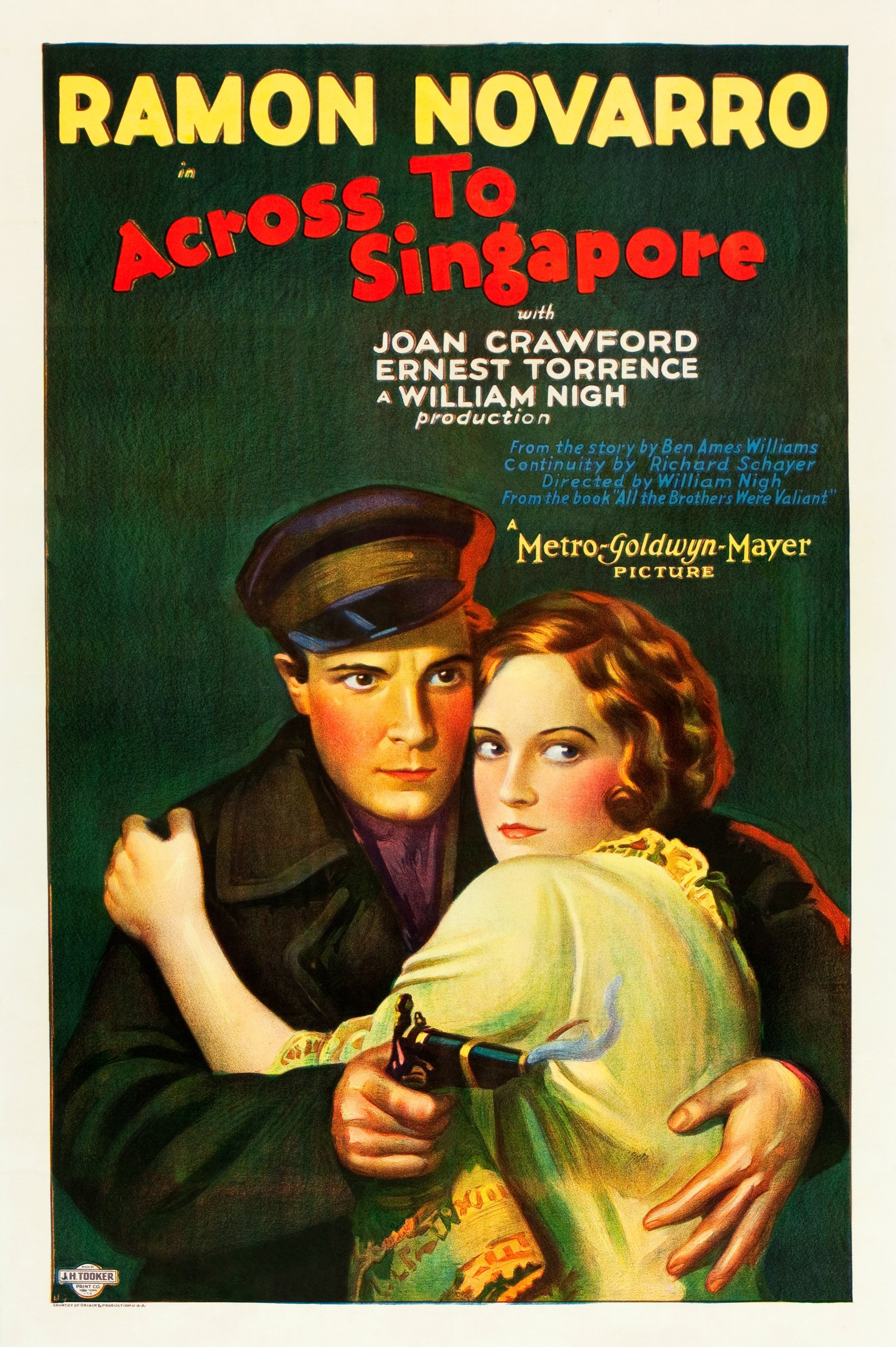
- Theatrical release poster
- Directed by: William Nigh
- Written by: Ted Shane; Titles: Joseph Farnham; Continuity: Richard Schayer
- Based on: All the Brothers Were Valiant; 1919 novel by Ben Ames Williams
- Produced by: William Nigh
- Starring: Ramon Novarro; Joan Crawford; Ernest Torrence; Frank Currier
- Cinematography: John F. Seitz
- Edited by: Ben Lewis
- Production company: Metro-Goldwyn-Mayer
- Distributed by: Metro-Goldwyn-Mayer
- Release date: April 30, 1928
- Running time: 85 minutes
- Country: United States
- Languages: Silent; English intertitles

Across to Singapore (1928) by William Nigh

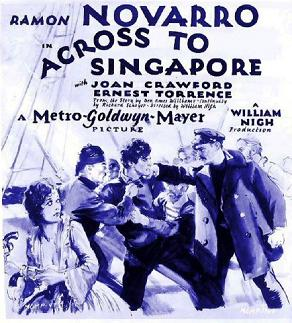
Theatrical release poster.

Across to Singapore is a 1928 American silent romantic drama film directed by William Nigh, and starring Ramon Novarro, Joan Crawford and Ernest Torrence. The plot involves a love triangle between a woman and two brothers, set on board ship and in Singapore.

The screenplay was written by Ted Shane based on the novel All the Brothers Were Valiant by Ben Ames Williams. This was the second film based on the novel; the first was All the Brothers Were Valiant (1923, now lost). It was remade a third time in 1953, as All the Brothers Were Valiant.

== Plot ==
In 1857, Joel Shore, the carefree youngest son of a seafaring family, has a flirtatious friendship with Priscilla Crowninshield, and he eventually falls in love with her. However, unbeknownst to him, Priscilla has been betrothed to Joel's much older brother, Mark. The wedding is announced in church as a surprise, and Joel and Priscilla are both shocked, with Priscilla refusing to kiss Mark after the betrothal ceremony.

Mark, a ship's captain, sails to Singapore, accompanied by Joel and their other brothers. Priscilla tells Joel she had no idea about the marriage and tries to kiss him, but Joel is hurt and rebuffs Priscilla's advances before he leaves. At the same time, Mark, mad about Priscilla spurning him, drinks heavily during the voyage and begins to see hallucinations of Priscilla. He senses that Priscilla loves someone else and threatens to harm whoever it is, but Joel tells him she does not love anyone but Mark. Mark continues to drink once they arrive in Singapore, but a conspiratorial crew led by Finch sails from Singapore without him, with Mark killed in a bar fight. Joel is put in handcuffs for allegedly not coming to his brother's aid during the fight.

Reaching home, Joel is freed; he finds Priscilla, and, taking her with him, he returns to Singapore for Mark, as he does not believe Mark is dead. They arrive in Singapore six months after having left, and find Mark a drunken mess. Mark sees that Priscilla does not love him, and he steps aside for his brother.

== Cast ==
- Ramon Novarro as Joel Shore
- Joan Crawford as Priscilla Crowninshield
- Ernest Torrence as Captain Mark Shore
- Frank Currier as Jeremiah Shore
- Dan Wolheim as Noah Shore
- Duke Martin as Matthew Shore
- Edward Connelly as Joshua Crowninshield
- James Mason as Ship's Mate Finch
- Anna May Wong as Singaporean Woman (uncredited)

== Production ==
Filming began on December 27, 1927, with the working title originally "China Bound". Douglas Fairbanks Jr. proposed to Joan Crawford at the pier in Long Beach, where the cast and crew had just arrived back from filming aboard the Nathan Ross.
