= Pride's Castle =

1949 novel

- Author: Frank Yerby
- Language: English
- Genre: Historical
- Publisher: Dial Press
- Publication date: 1949
- Publication place: United States
- Media type: Print

Pride's Castle is a 1949 historical novel by the American writer Frank Yerby. It was ranked ninth on the Publishers Weekly list of bestselling novels that year. Like many of his books it is set in nineteenth-century America. Although it was his first novel set in the North, the protagonist is a Southerner. It was adapted as an episode of The Philco Television Playhouse that aired on NBC in September 1949, with Anthony Quinn, Catherine McLeod and Louise Allbritton in the cast.

== Synopsis ==
Pride Dawson rises to become a robber baron in Gilded Age New York City.

== Bibliography ==
- Hill, James Lee. Anti-heroic Perspectives: The Life and Works of Frank Yerby. University of Iowa, 1976.
- Korda, Michael. Making the List: A Cultural History of the American Bestseller, 1900–1999 : as Seen Through the Annual Bestseller Lists of Publishers Weekly. Barnes & Noble Publishing, 2001.
