= Dangerous Mission =

1954 film by Louis King

- Theatrical release poster
- Directed by: Louis King
- Screenplay by: Charles Bennett; W. R. Burnett; Horace McCoy
- Story by: James Edmiston; Horace McCoy
- Produced by: Irwin Allen
- Starring: Victor Mature; Piper Laurie; Vincent Price
- Cinematography: William E. Snyder
- Edited by: Frederic Knudtson; Gene Palmer
- Music by: Roy Webb
- Production company: RKO Radio Pictures
- Distributed by: RKO Radio Pictures
- Release date: March 6, 1954 (United States)
- Running time: 75 minutes
- Country: United States
- Language: English
- Box office: $1 million

Dangerous Mission is a 1954 American Technicolor thriller film starring Victor Mature, Piper Laurie, Vincent Price and William Bendix. The film was produced by Irwin Allen, directed by Louis King and released by RKO Radio Pictures. It is remembered today mainly for its use of 3-D film technology.

== Plot ==
Louise Graham witnesses the murder of a New York City crime boss and flees the East to hide out in Glacier National Park, on the Montana-Canadian border. She is trailed there by two men, Matt Hallett and Paul Adams, one of whom is a federal agent charged with protecting her, the other a ruthless New York hit man who's been paid to silence her.

A subplot involves a Blackfeet Indian girl, Mary Tiller, a brilliant award-winning scholar whose overriding worries center on her father, Katoonai, a fugitive from the White man's justice. However, Glacier Park's chief of rangers, Joe Parker, believes he is innocent. Mary has another problem. She's unknowingly fallen in love with the aforementioned hit man.

All plotlines weave their way to one of the park's snow-covered mountains, a dangerous terrain where two of these characters meet their fate.

== Cast ==
- Victor Mature as Matt Hallett
- Piper Laurie as Louise Graham
- William Bendix as Chief Ranger Joe Parker
- Vincent Price as Paul Adams
- Betta St. John as Mary Tiller
- Dennis Weaver as The Ranger Clerk
- Harry Cheshire as Mr. Elster
- Steve Darrell as Katoonai Tiller
- Walter Reed as Ranger Dobson
- Marlo Dwyer as Mrs. Elster

== Production ==
The film was also known as Glacier and Rangers of the North. Filming began in July 1953.

The film is set in Glacier National Park, Montana and was largely filmed there.

W.R. Burnett said the original script was by Horace McCoy and the movie started filming when Burnett was called in. The writer said, "It was a terrible script. I couldn’t believe Horace wrote it—he must have been drunk—and Irwin didn’t know what was wrong with it." Burnett said he rewrote the script in four weeks, and later said "it's not a bad picture".

Charles Bennett called the film "the most ghastly mess" claiming the original script by W. R. Burnett and Irwin Allen "didn’t make any sense whatsoever" and Louis King approached Bennett two weeks into filming asking for help at a fee of $2,000 a week. "What I had to do was at least make some sense out of the script. I made sense of it, eventually, but it was bloody difficult, particularly because Victor Mature strongly objected to playing a dialogue scene that wasn’t in the script, which had to be there eventually in order to make sense of the story. Irwin, who was frightened to death of Mature, would say, “Leave it to Victor,” and I would have to fight like a bloody hyena."

== Reception ==
=== Critical response ===
In a contemporary review for The New York Times, critic Bosley Crowther called the film "unnatural, uninteresting and drab" and wrote: "Since our great national parks are open to virtually anyone who cares to visit them, there probably is no way of preventing their occasionally being exploited and abused. And that is most certainly what has happened to Glacier Park in the R. K. O. film ... [A] company of Hollywood people has the cheek to play a tale that hasn't the vitality or intelligence of a good comic-strip episode. It is a miserably dull and mixed-up fable about a hunt for a missing witness to a crime, with Vincent Price eventually emerging as some sort of villain, which is obvious all along."

More recently, critic Dennis Schwartz has also reviewed the film negatively, writing: "An action movie made for 3D that starts off looking like a real corker but winds up looking as stale as month-old bread. Director Louis King (Frenchie/Green Grass of Wyoming) never steers it away from its awkwardness. Despite a fine cast (unfortunately they all give corpse-like performances), capable screenwriters Charles Bennett and W.R. Burnett, and veteran story writers Horace McCoy and James Edmiston, the film is at best bearable ... William Bendix plays a blustery park ranger chief who knew Mature from their days as marines. His mission, in this film, is to put out a forest fire that has nothing to do with the plot, but looks swell on 3D. The film is noteworthy for the clumsy job Gene Palmer turned in as editor."

== Notes ==
- McGilligan, Patrick; Mate, Ken (1986). "W.R. Burnett: The Outsider". In McGilligan, Patrick (ed.). Backstory : interviews with screenwriters of Hollywood's golden age. University of California press. pp. 49–84.
