= Fairoaks (novel) =

1957 novel

- Author: Frank Yerby
- Language: English
- Genre: Historical
- Publisher: Dial Press
- Publication date: 1957
- Publication place: United States
- Media type: Print
- Pages: 405

Fairoaks is a 1957 historical novel by the American writer Frank Yerby. It was one of his better critically received works of the 1950s, at a time when his reputation amongst reviewers had been declining despite his popularity with readers.

== Synopsis ==
The novel spans four generations from 1780 to 1884 but focuses particularly on Guy Falks, a Southerner with ambitions and a desire for revenge that takes him to a variety of locations on both sides of the Atlantic Ocean, and the vast plantation Fairoaks.

== Bibliography ==
- Hill, James Lee. Anti-heroic Perspectives: The Life and Works of Frank Yerby. University of Iowa, 1976.
- Hill, James L. (2011). Tracy, Stephen C. (ed.). Writers of the Black Chicago Renaissance. Urbana, IL: University of Illinois Press. pp. 386–412. ISBN 9780252036392.
