= All the Brothers Were Valiant (novel) =

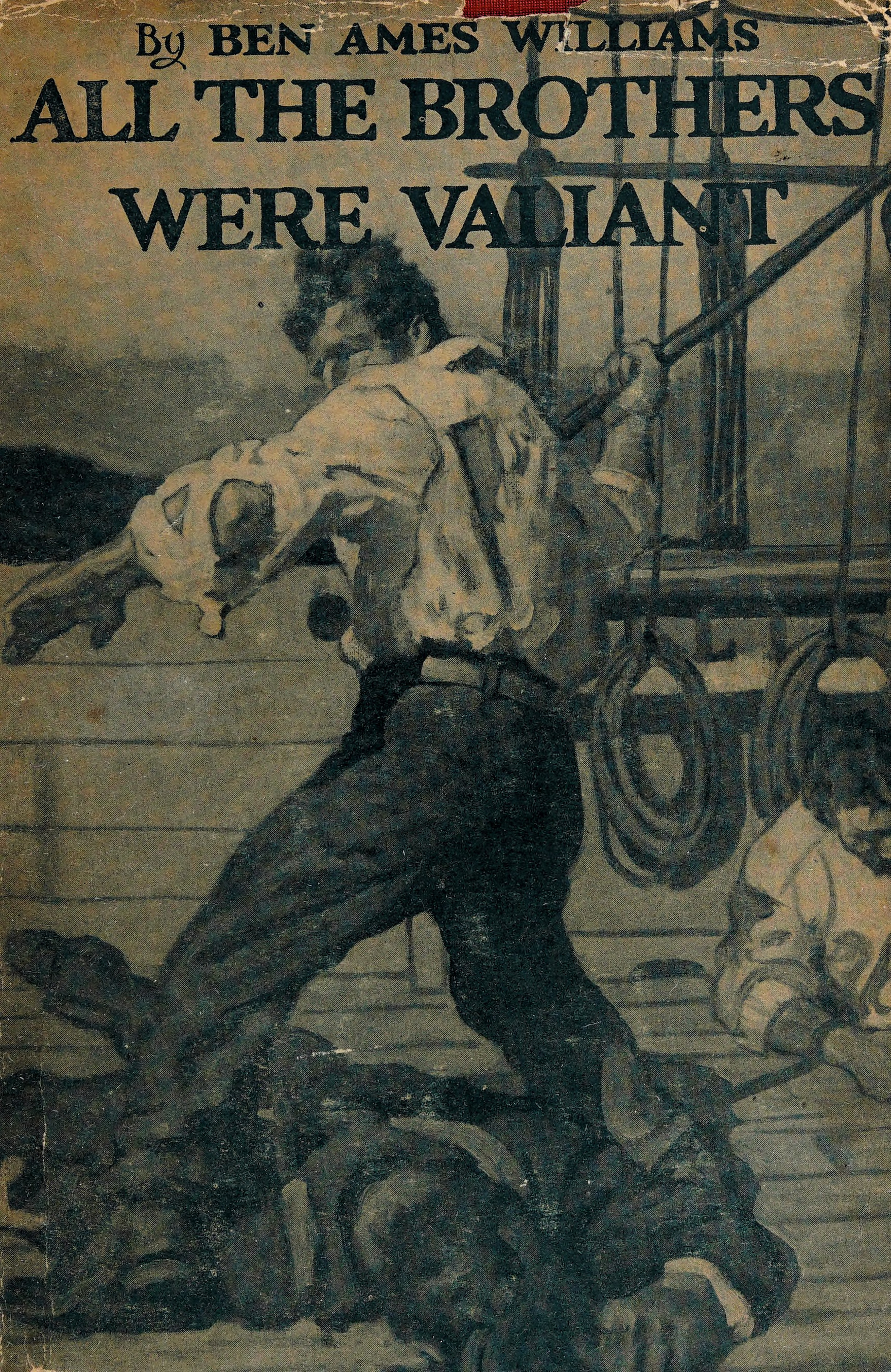
- Author: Ben Ames Williams
- Genre: Novel
- Publisher: The Macmillan Company
- Publication date: 1919
- Publication place: United States
- OCLC: 418497

All the Brothers Were Valiant is a story by Ben Ames Williams. It was published in the 1919 April and May issues of Everybody's Magazine with illustrations by N. C. Wyeth, a hardcover edition followed in May with jacket art, front and rear, also by Wyeth. It was Williams's first published novel, although he had previously written many short stories for magazines. It has been adapted to film three times, all by MGM: All the Brothers Were Valiant (1923, now lost), Across to Singapore (1928) and All the Brothers Were Valiant (1953). Polar explorer Richard E. Byrd carried a copy on his solo journey to Antarctica from 1933 to 1935—he wrote in his journal that he found it challenging to read due to eye problems caused by carbon monoxide poisoning from his stove.

== Editions ==
- Williams, Ben Ames (1919). All the Brothers Were Valiant (First ed.). New York: The Macmillan Company. pp. [2], 204, [2] p. (last 2 p. blank).
- Subsequent reimpressions include Grosset & Dunlap (New York, 1919), E.P. Dutton (New York, 1919), and the first U.K edition by Mills & Boon (London, 1920).
