= Floodtide (novel) =

1950 novel

- Author: Frank Yerby
- Language: English
- Genre: Historical
- Publisher: Dial Press
- Publication date: 1950
- Publication place: United States
- Media type: Print
- Pages: 342

Floodtide is a 1950 historical novel by the American writer Frank Yerby. It was ranked seventh on the Publishers Weekly list of bestselling novels that year. Like many of his works of the era it is set in the South during the nineteenth century.

== Synopsis ==
Ross Pary, the son of a saloon from the poor district of Natchez Under-the-Hill, schemes and fights his way up to join the slaveowner plantation elite of Mississippi.

== Bibliography ==
- Hill, James Lee. Anti-heroic Perspectives: The Life and Works of Frank Yerby. University of Iowa, 1976.
- Korda, Michael. Making the List: A Cultural History of the American Bestseller, 1900–1999 : as Seen Through the Annual Bestseller Lists of Publishers Weekly. Barnes & Noble Publishing, 2001.
