= Judas, My Brother =

Book by Frank Yerby

- First edition
- Author: Frank Yerby
- Language: English
- Genre: Historical novel
- Publisher: Dial Press
- Publication date: 1968
- Publication place: United States
- Media type: Print (Hardback & Paperback)
- ISBN: 0-434-89030-8 (hardback edition) & ISBN 0-8037-4289-4 (paperback edition)
- OCLC: 12983362

Judas, My Brother: The Story of the Thirteenth Disciple is a 1968 historical novel by Frank Yerby, published by Dial Press. The novel provides a narrative attempting a demythologized account of the events surrounding the life of Jesus and the origin of Christianity.

== Plot introduction ==
Written from the viewpoint of Nathan ('the Thirteenth Disciple'), the heavily footnoted book presents an adventure and romance storyline against the backdrop of the 1st century Roman Empire. Nathan's travels lead him to Rome to fight as a retiarius, and on his return to Judaea to become involved with the Apostles, the Zealots and the Essenes. He loves Shelomith (the disciple Salome, depicted in the novel as a prostitute), who does not return his affections due to her unrequited love for Yeshua (Jesus).

== Main themes ==
This story is simultaneously used as a vehicle for Yerby's examination of the historical personalities and Christian beliefs through the ideas of critical theological writings. The book is written from a strongly skeptical viewpoint: For miracles he offers alternative physical explanations, such as mistaken identity, discrepancies in traditional Jewish and Essene calendars, and other explanations of varying plausibility. On the frontispiece, Yerby warns "those emotionally dependent upon the Christian Religion" to read no further. The sleeve notes continue:

This novel touches on only two issues which, in a certain sense, might be called controversial: whether any man truly has the right to believe fanciful and childish nonsense; and whether any organization has the right to impose, by almost imperial fiat, belief in things that simply are not so. To me, irrationality is dangerous; perhaps the most dangerous force stalking through the world today. This novel, then, is one man's plea for an ecumenicism broad enough to include reasonable men; and his effort to defend his modest intellect from intolerable insult,

Though Yerby is skeptical of Biblical accounts of supernatural 'miracles', he presents the character 'Yeshua' as a man of strong moral character, deep compassion and keen insight into human nature, with a remarkable ability to inspire loyalty in his followers. Nathan finally concludes that the true miracle of Christianity is that a man could inspire such love in his disciples that they refuse to let him die; by sheer force of love they resurrect Him in their minds because they cannot live on without him.

Faced with this realization, Nathan becomes himself a disciple and devotes his life and wealth to the propagation of his new faith.
