= A Rage to Live =

1965 film by Walter Grauman

- Original film poster by Renato Fratini
- Directed by: Walter Grauman
- Screenplay by: John T. Kelley
- Based on: A Rage to Live by John O'Hara
- Produced by: Lewis J. Rachmil
- Starring: Suzanne Pleshette; Bradford Dillman; Ben Gazzara
- Cinematography: Charles Lawton Jr.
- Edited by: Stuart Gilmore
- Music by: Nelson Riddle
- Production company: The Mirisch Corporation
- Distributed by: United Artists
- Release date: October 20, 1965; (New York City)
- Running time: 101 minutes
- Country: United States
- Language: English

A Rage to Live is a 1965 American drama film directed by Walter Grauman and starring Suzanne Pleshette as a woman whose passions wreak havoc on her life. The screenplay by John T. Kelley is based on the 1949 novel of the same name by John O'Hara.

== Plot ==
The sexual voraciousness of newspaper heiress Grace Caldwell threatens to destroy the reputation of her wealthy Pennsylvania family. As a precocious teenager, she is assaulted in her own bedroom by a friend of her older brother Brock, Charlie Jay. She finally yields to Charlie willingly, making him the first of a long series of lovers. Grace understands her weakness but continues her path of seduction, until she meets San Francisco real estate broker Sidney Tate at a Christmas party. The two fall in love and he proposes marriage. Grace confesses her past, but despite being taken aback, Sidney marries her and she commits herself to a relationship. She maintains fidelity for the first few years of their union, which produces a son and a seemingly idyllic life on a farm.

Problems ensue when lusty contractor Roger Bannon, the son of one of her mother's former servants, confesses to Grace that he's been in love with her for years. An affair ensues and when she eventually ends it, he becomes enraged, gets drunk, and accidentally crashes his truck, killing himself. Reports of his death include details about his tryst with Grace, rumors which reach her husband. Under pressure, Grace admits her guilt to him and swears it will never happen again. Then, at a charity ball, an alcoholic socialite named Amy Hollister, whose husband, newspaper editor Jack Hollister, is in love with Grace, publicly accuses Grace of seducing her husband. Sidney, who witnesses the scene, is once more convinced that his wife has lied to him and goes away. Grace runs after him, swearing she had nothing with Jack Hollister. Still, Sidney departs, leaving her behind in a state of despair.

== Cast ==
- Suzanne Pleshette as Grace Caldwell Tate
- Bradford Dillman as Sidney Tate
- Ben Gazzara as Roger Bannon
- Peter Graves as Jack Hollister
- Bethel Leslie as Amy Hollister
- Carmen Mathews as Emily Caldwell
- Linden Chiles as Brock Caldwell
- Ruth White as Mrs. Bannon
- Mark Goddard as Charlie Jay
- Sarah Marshall as Connie
- George Furth as Paul Rutherford
- Virginia Christine as Emma

== Original novel ==
The novel was O'Hara's fourth book and his first in eleven years. The New York Times called it "his most ambitious book. It is by no means entirely successful, but it does express a vibrant vitality."

O'Hara said his earlier books "were special books about specialised people; but this is the big one, the over-all one."

The novel was a best seller.

== Text displayed after credits ==
At the end of the film, these lines of an Alexander Pope poem are displayed:

Wise Wretch! with Pleasures too refin'd to please,
With too much Spirit to be e'er at ease,
With too much Quickness ever to be taught,
With too much Thinking to have common Thought:
You purchase Pain with all that Joy can give,
And die of nothing but a Rage to live.

== Production ==
Film rights were bought by the Mirisch Corporation in 1959; the Mirisches had a deal with United Artists. The sale was on similar terms to O'Hara's From the Terrace – instead of selling the book for a flat price of $500,000 they had a five-year lease to make the film, with a down payment of $100,000 and O'Hara got 25% of the profits.

The novel was one of a series of properties the Mirisches bought around this time, others including Hawaii, West Side Story and Two for the Seesaw.

In July 1963 John T. Kelley was reported as working on the script.

By May 1964 Lewis J. Rachmill was assigned to produce, Walter Graumann was the director and Suzanne Pleshette had been cast in the lead. Graumann had just made 633 Squadron for the Mirisches. Ben Gazzara was given a male lead; it was his first film since finishing Arrest and Trial. Bradford Dillman played the other male lead.

Filming started June 1, 1964.

Grauman later signed to do three more films with the Mirisches.

== Critical reception ==
Variety said, "In this banal transfer from tome to film, the characters in John O'Hara's A Rage to Live have retained their two-dimensional unreality... Nympho heroine goes from man to man amidst corny dialog and inept direction which combine to smother all thesps."

TV Guide rates it 1 1/2 out of a possible four stars and adds, "In the transfer from novel to screen, O'Hara's characters have been transformed from vital, living personalities into stiff, unmotivated soap opera fodder."

== Awards and nominations ==
Howard Shoup was nominated for the Academy Award for Best Costume Design, Black and White but lost to Julie Harris for Darling.
