= The Golden Hawk (novel) =

1948 novel

- Author: Frank Yerby
- Language: English
- Genre: Historical
- Publisher: Dial Press
- Publication date: 1948
- Publication place: United States
- Media type: Print

The Golden Hawk is a 1948 historical novel by the American writer Frank Yerby. It was his third published novel, and was a popular success ranking sixth on the Publishers Weekly list of bestselling novels that year.

== Adaptation ==
In 1952 it was adapted into a film of the same title released by Columbia Pictures. It was directed by Sidney Salkow and featured Rhonda Fleming, Sterling Hayden and John Sutton.

== Bibliography ==
- Brown, Stephanie. The Postwar African American Novel: Protest and Discontent, 1945-1950. University Press of Mississippi, 2011.
- Goble, Alan. The Complete Index to Literary Sources in Film. Walter de Gruyter, 1999.
- Hill, James Lee. Anti-heroic Perspectives: The Life and Works of Frank Yerby. University of Iowa, 1976.
- Korda, Michael. Making the List: A Cultural History of the American Bestseller, 1900–1999 : as Seen Through the Annual Bestseller Lists of Publishers Weekly. Barnes & Noble Publishing, 2001.
