= Goat Song =

- First edition (publ. Dial Press)
- Author: Frank Yerby
- Language: English
- Publisher: Dial Press
- Publication date: 1967
- LC Class: PZ3.Y415 Gm

Goat Song (1967) is a novel by Frank Yerby describing ancient Sparta and the Peloponnesian War with Athens.

== Plot summary ==
Ariston, a Spartan youth undergoing the full extreme of Spartan training, is the hero cursed and blessed by a matchless beauty that was the Hellenic ideal. Wounded during training, he is wrongly accused of carnal relations with his mother. His fellow soldiers regard him as bad luck whom the gods have cursed, and refuse to fight alongside him. In battle against the Athenians, when his fellow Hoplites surrender, Ariston refuses and charges the enemy hoping to die. Captured and sold into slavery, he realises that Athens is a centre for culture and knowledge, things denied him during his harsh upbringing. Adopted by a wealthy Athenian knight, he studies under Socrates and learns the art of armour making, becoming a rich man. He earns his freedom and fortune only to face Sparta as an Athenian warrior, outfitting ships and showing reckless bravery in order to impress the Athenians and become one of them. Fighting to achieve Athenian citizenship, it is foretold that if he gains the thing he most desires, he will lose the thing he loves the most. It is only after many years of heartache, battles and death, when he meets the slave girl Cleothera, that he realises that in order to marry her, he must give up his dream of becoming an Athenian citizen. Which will win?

The title, a literal Greek etymology of the word 'tragedy', refers to advice given to Ariston as a desirable young man by a much older mentor: "So dance to the goat song while you can; hark to the panpipes in the hills. Put vine leaves in your hair; drink deeply. Clasp in hot embrace fair youths and maids."

== Historic Basis ==
It is a fair account of Athens in the time of Socrates, though the judgements on actual historic figures would obviously be a matter of dispute. But though the narrator writes as if he was basing the tale on a real individual whose work is mostly lost, there is no actual record of an Ariston who was a friend of Socrates.
