= The Saracen Blade =

1954 film by William Castle

- Directed by: William Castle
- Screenplay by: DeVallon Scott; George Worthing Yates
- Based on: The Saracen Blade by Frank Yerby
- Produced by: Sam Katzman
- Starring: Ricardo Montalbán; Betta St. John; Rick Jason
- Cinematography: Henry Freulich
- Edited by: Gene Havlick
- Color process: Technicolor
- Production company: Columbia Pictures
- Distributed by: Columbia Pictures
- Release date: June 6, 1954
- Running time: 77 minutes
- Country: United States
- Language: English

The Saracen Blade is a 1954 American adventure film directed by William Castle and starring Ricardo Montalbán, Betta St. John and Rick Jason. The film was produced and distributed by Columbia Pictures. It is based on the 1952 bestselling novel of the same name by Frank Yerby. It is set in Italy during the Crusades, when great families made war on each other during trips to the Holy Land.

== Plot ==
The story of Pietro di Donati, son of a 13th-century Sicilian peasant, who was born at almost the exact same moment as the Emperor Frederick. Their stories are linked against the early 13th century and backdrop of the Children’s and Albigensian Crusades. Pietro's father is killed and he is made an orphan early in life, it is very sad and tragic.

== Cast ==
- Ricardo Montalbán as Pietro Donati
- Betta St. John as Iolanthe Rogliano
- Rick Jason as Enzio Siniscola
- Carolyn Jones as Elaine of Siniscola
- Whitfield Connor as Frederick II
- Michael Ansara as Count Alesandro Siniscola
- Edgar Barrier as Baron Rogliano
- Nelson Leigh as Isaac
- Pamela Duncan as Zenobia
- Guy Prescott as Donati (as Frank Pulaski)

== Production ==
Castle said "it was a herculean task for me to adhere to the schedule of the movie... for three years I had been up to my ass in queens, kings and jokers" but he enjoyed working with Montalban.
