= The Miracle of the Bells =

1948 film by Irving Pichel

- Theatrical release poster
- Directed by: Irving Pichel
- Screenplay by: Ben Hecht; Quentin Reynolds
- Based on: The Miracle of the Bells; 1946 novel by Russell Janney
- Produced by: Jesse L. Lasky Jr. Walter MacEwen
- Starring: Fred MacMurray; Alida Valli; Frank Sinatra
- Cinematography: Robert De Grasse
- Edited by: Elmo Williams
- Music by: Leigh Harline
- Production company: Jesse L. Lasky Productions
- Distributed by: RKO Radio Pictures
- Release dates: March 16, 1948 (Premiere-New York City); March 27, 1948 (U.S.)
- Running time: 120 minutes
- Country: United States
- Language: English
- Budget: $2 million
- Box office: $2.1 million (US rentals)

The Miracle of the Bells is a 1948 American drama film directed by Irving Pichel, written by Quentin Reynolds and Ben Hecht, and produced by RKO. It stars Fred MacMurray, Alida Valli and Frank Sinatra.

The film is based on the 1946 best-selling novel, The Miracle of the Bells, by Russell Janney.

== Plot ==
Hollywood press agent Bill Dunnigan, who works for a movie studio, arrives by train with the body of actress Olga Treskovna, in her hometown of Coaltown, Pennsylvania. He was in love with Olga, although he never told her. He has brought her back to Coaltown to honor her deathbed request to be buried there. He encounters hostility from the local funeral director who resents her because she never finished paying for her father's burial. After being pressured by the funeral director and the pastor of the larger and more prestigious St. Leo's Catholic church, Dunnigan goes to Father Paul, the priest of the smaller and poorer Polish St. Michael's church in accordance with Olga's wishes. Showing Dunnigan where Olga's parents are buried in the graveyard atop a hill, away from the dust of the mines, Fr. Paul sings.

The main flashback story begins, showing how Olga is plucked from a chorus line in a nightclub to serve as the stand-in for an extremely temperamental film actress. Dunnigan realizes that Olga has the makings of a talented actress herself, and when the film's star throws a tantrum and walks out, he convinces Marcus Harris, the film's producer, to audition Olga, despite her having had no film experience. Olga is cast as Joan. As filming progresses, she shows signs of being seriously ill. Dunnigan is secretly by her doctor informed that Olga has a severe, fatal form of tuberculosis, likely caused by her inhalation of the coal dust where she grew up. Desperate to do something for her hometown that will restore the pride of its bitter and disillusioned citizens, Olga continues with the filming, and collapses after the shooting ends. Rushed to a hospital, she dies with Dunnigan at her side.

To generate interest in the film, Dunnigan convinces all five churches in Coaltown to ring their bells for three days as a tribute to the dead actress, paying them with checks that he cannot cover. Huge interest begins to develop in the actress who gave her life to complete the film, and Marcus Harris wires Dunnigan enough money to cover the checks. Harris calls Dunnigan and tells him that he has decided not to release the film, because the moviegoing public might resent greeting the arrival of a new star who has died. Harris intends to recast the role and begin filming all over again.

On the day of Olga's funeral, an overflow crowd which includes Dunnigan enters the tiny local church. As the crowd prays, a loud creaking noise is heard, and the statues of St. Michael and the Virgin Mary slowly turn on their pedestals until they face Olga's coffin. The parishioners regard this as a miracle, even though Fr. Paul has already determined the ground has shifted, causing the pillars which support the statues to move because of the large crowd. Dunnigan persuades Father Paul not to quash the faith of the people of Coaltown.

Marcus Harris, after much reluctance, decides to release the film, which becomes a huge success. Fr. Paul is overwhelmed by the nationwide donations his church has received and the movie studio's offer to build a clinic to fight the disease which cost Olga her life.

== Cast ==
- Fred MacMurray as Bill Dunnigan
- Alida Valli as Olga (as Valli)
- Frank Sinatra as Father Paul
- Lee J. Cobb as Marcus Harris (as Lee Cobb)
- Harold Vermilyea as Orloff
- Charles Meredith as Father Spinsky
- James Nolan as Tod Jones (as Jim Nolan)
- Veronica Pataky as Anna Klovna
- Philip Ahn as Ming Gow
- Frank Ferguson as Dolan
- Frank Wilcox as Dr. Jennings
- Dorothy Sebastian as Miss Katie Orwin (uncredited)
- Michael Raffetto as Harold Tanby (uncredited)

== Production ==
Several exterior scenes were shot on location in Glen Lyon, Pennsylvania, the mining town on which the fictional Coaltown of the novel and film was based. Many of the extras in the film were actual miners working for the Glen-Alden Coal Company.

== Release ==
The film encountered distribution difficulties in England because of a boycott against the films of Ben Hecht. Hecht had made derogatory comments about the presence of Britain in Palestine.

The premiere for the film took place on Friday, March 26, 1948 at the then "Park Theater" on Brownsville Road in the coal mining town of Library, Pennsylvania. The town was chosen to host the premiere because it "most resembled a typical American mining community, like the one portrayed in the movie." Accompanying the premiere, a large motorcade escorted movie stars Charles Coburn, Ruth Warrick and Leo Carrillo into the town of Library. The stars visited the War Memorial just down the road from the theater, where they addressed the enormous crowd of locals who showed up for the pomp and celebration.

== Reception ==
The Miracle of the Bells was dismissed by critics, and was mentioned in the satirical film book The Golden Turkey Awards, which poked fun at Frank Sinatra's portrayal of Father Paul. Time harshly criticized the film, declaring that "St. Michael ought to sue". In The Nation in 1948, critic James Agee wrote, "As pernicious a gobbet of pseudo-religious asafetida as I have been forced to sniff at, man and Sunday-school-boy. I hereby declare myself the founding father of a Society for the Prevention of Cruelty to God."

The film recorded a loss of $640,000. Bank of America repossessed the film from its producers.

== Radio adaptation ==
The Miracle of the Bells was presented on Lux Radio Theatre May 31, 1948. The adaptation starred MacMurray, Valli, and Sinatra.
