= The Devil's Laughter =

1953 novel

- Author: Frank Yerby
- Language: English
- Genre: Historical romance
- Publisher: Dial Press
- Publication date: 1953
- Publication place: United States
- Media type: Print
- Pages: 376

The Devil's Laughter is a 1953 historical adventure novel by the American writer Frank Yerby. One reviewer described it as having "more dazzle than depth". It is set in Europe of the late eighteenth century in contrast to Yerby's more usual setting of nineteenth century America.

== Synopsis ==
Jean Paul Marin, the son of a wealthy merchant father is committed to combating the injustices of French aristocracy and monarchy and becomes a leader of the developing French Revolution. He also becomes romantically involved with three very different women.

== Bibliography ==
- Bonner Jr., John W. Bibliography of Georgia Authors, 1949–1965. University of Georgia Press, 2010.
- Hill, James Lee. Anti-heroic Perspectives: The Life and Works of Frank Yerby. University of Iowa, 1976.
