= A Rage to Live (novel) =

1949 novel by John O'Hara

- Author: John O'Hara
- Language: English
- Genre: Fiction
- Published: 1949
- Publisher: Random House
- Publication place: USA
- Pages: 752
- ISBN: 9780812971354

A Rage to Live is a 1949 novel by John O'Hara. It was a bestseller upon release. The novel is described as a large-scale social chronicle, depicting a wide swath of American society, set in the fictional locale of Fort Penn, PA.

The book achieved commercial success, appearing at fourth place in Publishers Weekly's list of the top ten best-selling fiction works in the United States in the year 1949. A film based on the book was released in 1965.
