= The Vixens =

1947 novel

- Author: Frank Yerby
- Language: English
- Genre: Historical
- Publisher: Dial Press
- Publication date: 1947
- Publication place: United States
- Media type: Print
- Preceded by: The Foxes of Harrow

The Vixens is a 1947 historical novel by the American writer Frank Yerby. It was his second published novel and like the first, The Foxes of Harrow, to which it was a sequel it was a commercial success and was ranked fifth on the Publishers Weekly list of bestselling novels that year. Yerby himself disliked the book and later described it as his worst novel.

== Bibliography ==
- Brown, Stephanie. The Postwar African American Novel: Protest and Discontent, 1945-1950. University Press of Mississippi, 2011.
- Hill, James Lee. Anti-heroic Perspectives: The Life and Works of Frank Yerby. University of Iowa, 1976.
- Korda, Michael. Making the List: A Cultural History of the American Bestseller, 1900–1999 : as Seen Through the Annual Bestseller Lists of Publishers Weekly. Barnes & Noble Publishing, 2001.
