= The Foxes of Harrow =

1947 film by John M. Stahl

- Theatrical film poster
- Directed by: John M. Stahl
- Screenplay by: Wanda Tuchock; Dwight Taylor (contributor to dialogue) (uncredited); Edwin Justus Mayer (contributor to dialogue) (uncredited); Thomas Job (contributor to dialogue) (uncredited)
- Based on: The Foxes of Harrow; 1946 novel by Frank Yerby
- Produced by: William A. Bacher; Darryl F. Zanuck
- Starring: Rex Harrison; Maureen O'Hara; Richard Haydn; Victor McLaglen; Vanessa Brown; Patricia Medina; Gene Lockhart
- Cinematography: Joseph LaShelle
- Edited by: James B. Clark
- Music by: David Buttolph
- Distributed by: 20th Century Fox
- Release date: 24 September 1947
- Running time: 117 minutes
- Country: United Kingdom-United States
- Language: English
- Budget: $2,750,000
- Box office: $3,150,000 (US rentals)

The Foxes of Harrow is a 1947 American-British adventure film directed by John M. Stahl. The film stars Rex Harrison, Maureen O'Hara, and Richard Haydn. It is based on the novel of the same name by Frank Yerby, the sixth best-selling novel in the US in 1946.

The film was nominated for the Academy Award for Best Production Design (Lyle R. Wheeler, Maurice Ransford, Thomas Little, Paul S. Fox).

== Plot ==
In pre-Civil War New Orleans, roguish Irish gambler Stephen Fox buys his way into society – something he could not do in his homeland because he is illegitimate.

== Cast ==
- Rex Harrison as Stephen Fox
- Maureen O'Hara as Odalie 'Lilli' D'Arceneaux
- Richard Haydn as Andre LeBlanc
- Victor McLaglen as Captain Mike Farrell
- Vanessa Brown as Aurore D'Arceneaux
- Patricia Medina as Desiree
- Gene Lockhart as Viscount Henri D'Arceneaux
- Charles Irwin as Sean Fox
- Hugo Haas as Otto Ludenbach
- Dennis Hoey as Master of Harrow
- Roy Roberts as Tom Warren
- Marcel Journet as St. Ange
- Randy Stuart as Stephen's birth mother (uncredited; her first acting role)
- Ralph Faulkner as Fencing Instructor (uncredited)
- Kenneth Washington as Achille (uncredited)
- Eugene Borden as French Auctioneer (uncredited)

== Notes ==
The storyline is derived from the 1946 eponymous novel The Foxes of Harrow by Frank Yerby. Fox paid author Frank Yerby $150,000 for the motion picture rights to The Foxes of Harrow, which was his first novel. A December 1947 Ebony article called the figure "the biggest bonanza ever pocketed by a colored writer" and stated that the book was "the first Negro-authored novel ever bought by a Hollywood studio."

== Critical response ==
Variety wrote in its review: "It builds into a powerful drama of an adventurer's rise to fame and fortune in New Orleans of the 19th century. Exciting story has strong production, vivid developments and helped along with excellent pace most of the time."

Bosley Crowther of The New York Times wrote: "Obese is the word which a reviewer for this newspaper used to describe Frank Yerby's The Foxes of Harrow in its original novel form. The gentleman was being most courteous—if the film is even a shadow of the book.

== See also ==
- List of films featuring slavery
