= The Miracle of the Bells (novel) =

1946 novel by Russell Janney

- Book cover, 1946
- Author: Russell Janney
- Language: English
- Publisher: Prentice-Hall
- Publication date: 1946
- Publication place: United States
- Media type: Print (Hardcover, Paperback)
- Pages: 497

The Miracle of the Bells is a novel written by American author Russell Janney and released in September 1946. It was the first novel by Janney, who was 61 years old and had been a press agent for stage productions and motion pictures. It was the best-selling novel of 1947, as determined by Publishers Weekly. By March 1948, it had sold over 500,000 copies and had been translated into 14 languages.

== Plot ==
Olga Treskovna, a young woman from Coaltown, a Pennsylvania coal-mining town, receives a role as an extra in a movie adaptation of the life of Joan of Arc. She is then recast as the star of the film. During the production, she is diagnosed with a fatal case of tuberculosis developed from inhaling coal dust in her home town. She hides her illness and continues with filming, dying at the end of shooting. The motion picture's producer decides not to release the film, fearing that a film starring an unknown, dead actress will be a box office failure.

Bill Dunnigan, a press agent who befriended Olga, has silently loved her. Per Olga's final wish, Dunnigan accompanies her body back to Coaltown. He persuades the five churches in Coaltown to ring their bells continuously for four days as a publicity stunt. The stunt draws national attention with radio networks broadcasting the ringing bells. It also inspires faith as the people of Coaltown respond to the bells by flocking to churches they had neglected in favor of the town's 22 saloons. It also inspires a sense of warm-hearted community, as an atheist union leader finds religion and the owner of the local coal mine develops a feeling of brotherly love.

On the day of Olga's funeral, a large throng crowds into St. Michael's. Altar boys later discover that two statues, one of the Archangel and the other of Virgin Mary, have shifted on their pedestals, turning to face Olga's coffin. The parish priest discovers that the shifting of the statues was caused by the weight of the crowd on pillars in the basement, but Dunnigan persuades the priest to allow the people to believe it was a miracle with the following plea:

I found this town a deadly place; except for you, Father, filled, with selfish, cruel people. Their eyes did not see. The faces that passed me on the street the first evening -- dull, without hope, without joy. There was a change yesterday. The bells did that. If not joy, there was at least an awakening interest in something besides just to struggle for money and as I rushed here this morning there is another change -- a hope, a glow, a living flame in the faces -- in the eyes turning toward St. Michael. A bigger miracle than any mere turning of some statues is happening in Coaltown.

== Elements adapted from real life ==
The book includes autobiographical elements. Janney, like Dunnigan, was a press agent for motion pictures. The story of Olga was inspired by the life of actress Olga Treskoff. The real-life Treskoff was born as Anna Troski but later adopted the stage name Olga Treskoff. She grew up in the coal town of Glen Lyon, Pennsylvania, and moved to New York at age 16. Treskoff appeared in several theatrical plays and later partnered with Janney in producing Broadway plays, including The Vagabond King (1925). The real-life Olga died in 1938 and was buried at St. Michael's Church in Glen Lyon. After years of work on the novel, Janney wrote The Miracle of the Bells as "a loving remembrance of the real-life actress Olga Treskoff."

Much of the book is centered around events at Coaltown's St. Michael's Church, and Treskoff's funeral was held at St. Michael's Church in Glen Lyon. The release of the book and later the motion picture "brought worldwide fame to St. Michael's", as fans traveled to Glen Lyon to visit the actual locations.

== Reception ==
A review of the book in Time magazine opined: "As a novel, The Miracle of the Bells is one of the worst ever published; as a business proposition it has cornered the schmaltz market and provides a role for every star in Hollywood."

A reviewer in The Atlanta Constitution wrote that he had not read "a more engrossing and an appealing novel than this" since he read Tarzan of the Apes as a boy. The reviewer continued: "It is thrilling, in a meaningful and purposeful way. And it is constructed with simplicity, written in an easy free style that makes for enjoyable, not-to-be-put-down-until-finished reading."

Albert E. Idell in The Philadelphia Inquirer described it as "badly written, verbose and over-long," filled with stock characters, and "mawkish and sentimental to the point of being maudlin". Yet, Idell wrote that "the real miracle of Russell Janney's novel" is that, despite these flaws, the book "achieves remarkable power" and is "almost impossible to put it down."

H. W. Ettelson in The Commercial Appeal wrote that, while "no masterpiece", "it is a work that has definite merits and excellences". Ettelson praised the book's "vigorous narrative style" and its intriguing plot "developed with the skill of a natural storyteller." Ettelson wrote that the book's chief flaw was its "unconscious sacrilege" in treating religion "as if it were something to be promoted by a publicity ballyhoo a la Hollywood."

The Richmond Times-Dispatch called it "wildly improbable and delightfully heartwarming." The review continued:

Purists will shudder at Mr. Janney's style ... There will be gasps at cliches and some quivers at the liberty he takes with rules of rhetoric. But let grammarians shudder. While they're worrying, ... Mr. Janney will be cleaning up, for royalties will be rich and movie rights colossal on "The Miracle of the Bells" and readers who want a fine novel of escape, a story that restores their faith and love in and for their fellow-men will enjoy and recommend "The Miracle of the Bells."

A review in the Evening Star conceded the book might be viewed by some as "literary ham", but noted that ham, when cooked properly, is "a delicious and sustaining food." The reviewer found the purging of the town to be the book's essential element and concluded:

Even though you doubt that it would happen to a town full off hard-boiled coal miners, you feel it happening to you. Whence, I submit, no more defense of the author need be uttered, stale props or new. For, by that circumstance, he has the Father of Criticism on his side -- Aristotle, no less. Aristotle, to be sure, said that great drama should purge by the loftiness of its beauty and its moral. Mr. Janney, writing for people who are pretty close to immune to loftiness of any kind, offers the purge of promise -- of hope of escape from petty sordidness, of renewed belief in living faith, of life beyond the grave. These are the current heart hungers. His book speaks to them directly.

David T. Bazelon, in Commentary, wrote that Janney presents a world "simplified out of all relation to reality in order to enable Mr. Janney and Hollywood to approve of it as good." He continued: "Mr. Janney's fantastic piece of fiction is significant not only in that it shows the effect of the movies on other cultural media, but also for the relations it suggests between religion and Hollywood. Dunnigan is in part a press agent for religion, wanting to 'put it over' the same way he sells movies. He is continually saying that religion and the theater both put on 'shows'; he calls God the 'Great Producer.'"

The Pittsburgh Press called it a novel which "can be read in a convent", a "best-seller free of smut."

== Adaptations ==
Janney sold the motion picture rights to the book to Jesse L. Lasky Jr. for a reported $100,000 (equivalent to $1,441,878 in 2025). It was adapted into the 1948 film The Miracle of the Bells, starring Fred MacMurray and Frank Sinatra. Janney was furious with choices made by the film's producers, including the casting of MacMurray, who Janney viewed as colorless and inept, in the role of Dunnigan. His anger grew after reading the screenplay, and the "last straw" for Janney was the decision to include a song for Sinatra to warble in the role of Father Paul. Janney hired a lawyer to protest the decisions, but was advised that he was helpless to prevent the changes.

The work was also adapted for Lux Radio Theatre on May 31, 1948.
