= Dream Wife =

1953 film by Sidney Sheldon

- Theatrical release poster
- Directed by: Sidney Sheldon
- Screenplay by: Sidney Sheldon; Herbert Baker; Alfred Lewis Levitt
- Produced by: Dore Schary
- Starring: Cary Grant; Deborah Kerr; Walter Pidgeon; Betta St. John; Buddy Baer; Eduard Franz
- Cinematography: Milton R. Krasner
- Edited by: George White
- Music by: Conrad Salinger
- Distributed by: Metro-Goldwyn-Mayer
- Release date: June 19, 1953
- Running time: 100 minutes
- Country: United States
- Language: English
- Budget: $1,565,000
- Box office: $1,885,000

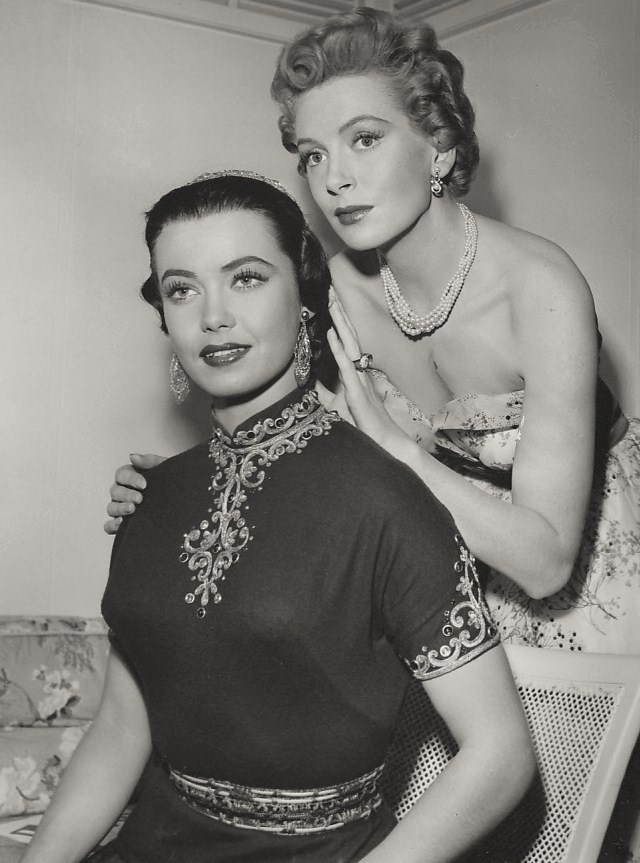
Betta St. John and Deborah Kerr

Dream Wife is a 1953 American romantic comedy film directed by Sidney Sheldon and starring Cary Grant, Deborah Kerr, and Walter Pidgeon, with Betta St. John, Buddy Baer, and Eduard Franz.

The film was produced by Dore Schary, from a screenplay by Sheldon, Herbert Baker, and Alfred Lewis Levitt. The music score was by Conrad Salinger, the cinematography by Milton R. Krasner and the art direction by Daniel B. Cathcart and Cedric Gibbons. The costume design by Herschel McCoy and Helen Rose received an Oscar nomination.

== Plot ==
Businessman Clemson Reade breaks off his engagement with workaholic fiance Effie, and becomes engaged to the adoring Princess Tarji from the fictional country of Bukistan, who he sees as an "old-fashioned" girl. As Bukistan is in the midst of making an oil trade agreement with the United States, the State Department assigns a handler to Princess Tarji. Surprisingly, the person given the assignment is Effie.

As Reade endeavors to get close to his fiance, Effie ends up educating the princess about Western ideas of emancipation and the modern role of a wife. Effie teaches Tarji the English language through books about important American feminists. While working with Tarjii, Effie comes to moderate some of her own ideas.

Conversely, Reade's attempted courtship of the princess, which he initially conducts by American customs, must be adjusted to Bukistan tradition. Effie explains to him that the marriage, called "hufi", is followed by a prolonged period of celebration called "bruchah". These terms are borrowed for comedic effect from the Jewish terms "huppah" — the canopy beneath which the marriage ceremony takes place, and the "sheva bruchis or sheva brachot" - the 7 blessings. "Bruchah" means "blessing", and these are recited both at the ceremony and throughout the week-long celebration that follows.

Tarji embraces the ideas Effie presents. She adopts American clothing and allows herself such activities as taking a walk through the city on her own. Not understanding the language, Tarji smiles warmly at the people she passes. A number of the men she passes mistake Tarji's friendliness for romantic intent. Several of them arrive at her apartment, and a fight breaks out between them and Reade. The police are called, with the result being that Tarji is thrown in jail. Outraged, her father travels to the United States with the intent of negating his daughter's engagement. However, Effie charms Tarji's father into reconsidering, much to Reade's dismay. Tarji confesses to Reade that she does not love him, and will not come to their wedding ceremony. Realizing his true feelings are for Effie, Reade is relieved to be released from his commitment.

Tarji is summoned by her father, who lectures her sternly. Despite her earlier assertion, she arrives for her wedding with Reade. He is aghast, and attempts to rebuke her for abandoning her newfound feminist ideals, ultimately succeeding in stopping the marriage. Tarji's father is outraged, but Effie slyly congratulates him, pointing out that he would not let a man like Reade ruin the oil deal he had with the United States, even though he was a scoundrel. Tarji's father agrees to uphold the treaty, despite the wedding not going through. He tells Effie she must love Reade very much, implying he understood her true motives all along. The wedding is cancelled, Reade and Effie kiss, and a mild earthquake occurs.

== Cast ==
- Cary Grant as Clemson Reade
- Deborah Kerr as Effie
- Walter Pidgeon as Walter McBride
- Betta St. John as Tarji
- Eduard Franz as Khan of Bukistan
- Les Tremayne as Ken Landwell
- Donald Randolph as Ali
- Bruce Bennett as Charlie Elkwood
- Richard Anderson as Henry Malvine
- Dan Tobin as Mr. Brown
- Movita as Rima
- Gloria Holden as Mrs. Jean Landwell
- Gordon Richards as Sir Cecil
- Virginia Mullen as Annie

== Reception ==
According to MGM records, the film earned $1,213,000 in the U.S. and Canada and $672,000 elsewhere, meaning it resulted in a loss of $456,000.

== In other media ==
The character of Princess Tarji was resurrected in one episode of Sheldon's I Dream of Jeannie, titled "This Is Murder" (4/9/66), portrayed by Gila Golan.
