= High Tide at Noon =

1957 film

- Film poster
- Directed by: Philip Leacock
- Written by: Neil Paterson
- Based on: novel by Elisabeth Ogilvie
- Produced by: David Deutsch; Earl St. John; Julian Wintle
- Starring: Betta St. John
- Cinematography: Eric Cross
- Edited by: Sidney Hayers
- Music by: John Veale
- Production company: Rank Organisation Film Productions
- Release date: 30 April 1957
- Running time: 109 minutes
- Country: United Kingdom
- Language: English

High Tide at Noon is a 1957 British drama film directed by Philip Leacock. It was entered into the 1957 Cannes Film Festival. High Tide at Noon was based on the first of a series of novels by Elisabeth Ogilvie, set in Maine. Location work was done in Devon.

The film was one of several Rank movies made set overseas to appeal to the international market.

== Plot ==
A woman named Joanna returns to an island off the coast of Nova Scotia where she was raised, and where memories immediately stir from her past. The entire film is thereafter in flashback.

She recalls being 17 and having the attentions of three young men. She has had a previous kiss with the handsome but arrogant and aggressive Simon Breck and she agrees to meet him. When he makes a move on her she runs off. Nils Sorensen loves her, but is seen by Joanna only as a friend, not a suitor. She ultimately marries Alec Douglas, a gentle soul who reads poetry to her. All the men and all the local fisherman use small boats to fish for Maine lobster.

Economic hardship overwhelms nearly everyone on the island, particularly Joanna's parents, the MacKenzies, as the fishing community's lobster traps start to come up empty. Worse for her, Alec amasses a large debt to Simon as a result of his gambling. It seems that Alec is stealing lobster from rival pots in order to pay his debts. One night, he is drowned: it is unclear if this is accidental but Nils takes part of the blame.

Simon threatens Joanna and Nils drives him off the island, threatening to kill him. Nils offers to marry Joanna but she declines. He leaves the island soon after without saying goodbye. All three men ultimately disappear from her life. However, as the flashback ends, upon her return many years later, Joanna is pleased to once again encounter Nils.

== Cast ==
- Betta St. John as Joanna
- William Sylvester as Alec Douglas
- Michael Craig as Nils Sorenson
- Flora Robson as Donna MacKenzie
- Alexander Knox as Stephen MacKenzie
- Peter Arne as Owen MacKenzie
- Patrick McGoohan as Simon Breck
- Patrick Allen as Charles MacKenzie
- Jill Dixon as Matille Trudeau
- Susan Beaumont as Kristy
- John Hayward as Philip MacKenzie
- Errol MacKinnon as Peter Grant

== Production ==
The film was based on a novel by Elisabeth Ogilvie which was published in 1945. The novel was set in Maine. She wrote a sequel, Storm Tide, which was published in 1947.

Film rights were purchased by the Rank Organisation. The original director was Pat Jackson, who was a freelance director who had done work for Rank. Jackson called the story "very interesting, quite good". Virginia McKenna was meant to star. Jackson saw Patrick McGoohan on stage in Moby Dick and cast him in the film. Jackson said, "He was going to be the hero! And he would have been wonderful."

Jackson struggled to find a suitable island off Nova Scotia or anyhere in Britain but found one off the coast of Sweden. A set was built recreating the village. When Jackson returned to Pinewood he was met by James Archibald, a Rank executive, who informed him McKenna did not approve of the script. This upset Jackson who complained about McKenna to John Davis, head of Rank. Davis informed Jackson he wanted to cancel the film because he lost faith in it.

Jackson then heard Davis had hired Philip Leacock to direct it and the film was made, with McGoohan as the villain. Jackson was offered two more films from Rank, including Dangerous Exile and turned them down. He said the whole experience "was a total disaster, for me. I mean, that really ended my film career."

Philip Leacock had previously directed another film set on Nova Scotia for Rank, The Little Kidnappers, which shared the same screenwriter as High Tide at Noon, Neil Paterson. Sean Connery auditioned for a role but was told he was "too dark".

The lead role went to American actor Betta St John, who had appeared in Britain on stage in South Pacific, fell in love with an Englishman and decided to stay. According to Michael Craig, St John did not tell them she was four months pregnant and "by the time we finished shooting the picture we couldn't shoot below the shoulders. There were a lot of problems with that." Filmink argued the movie had "a splendid lead part for a female, and it’s ironic that a few years previously, when Rank had a staggering line-up of female stars that it put in lousy roles (Kay Kendall, Diane Cilento, Diana Dors), they’d all since moved on to greener pastures; the studio offered it to Virginia McKenna who turned it down, so they went to Betta St John, who is nice and pretty but simply doesn’t have “It”."

The bulk of the movie was shot at Pinewood Studios, where a huge set was built for the village. There was some location work in Nova Scotia "with a few of the cast, mainly footage of the boat landing, stuff like that," said Leacock. There was also location filming in Cornwall. Filming in Canada took place in September 1956 with the unit in Pinewood by October.

According to Jackson, the film "cost a lot of money."

== Reception ==
=== Box office ===
Pat Jackson later said the film "did not do very well, how could it? A sea picture shot inside! In fact it did disastrously."

=== Critical ===
Variety called it "A long, slow-moving drama with modest marquee strength... a tough proposition to sell."

Filmink argued "it’s the sort of movie that should have been made fifteen years before at Gainsborough under Maurice Ostrer and Ted Black (not Sydney Box), or a few years later with additional sex content."

== Notes ==
- McFarlane, Brian (1997). An autobiography of British cinema : as told by the filmmakers and actors who made it. Methuen.
