= The Golden Hawk =

1952 film

- Theatrical release poster
- Directed by: Sidney Salkow
- Written by: Frank Yerby; Robert E. Kent
- Based on: The Golden Hawk; 1948 novel by Frank Yerby
- Produced by: Sam Katzman
- Starring: Rhonda Fleming; Sterling Hayden; John Sutton
- Cinematography: William V. Skall
- Edited by: Edwin Bryant
- Music by: Mischa Bakaleinikoff
- Production company: Esskay Pictures
- Distributed by: Columbia Pictures
- Release date: October 17, 1952
- Running time: 83 minutes
- Country: United States
- Language: English

The Golden Hawk is a 1952 American Technicolor historical adventure film directed by Sidney Salkow and starring Rhonda Fleming, Sterling Hayden and John Sutton. The screenplay is based on the 1948 novel of the same title by Frank Yerby.

== Plot ==
During the 17th century, French sea captain Kit "The Hawk" Gerardo is on Basse-Terre Island with a crew but no ship. He duels the captain of the ship Sea Flower and commandeers his ship. His objective is to capture a much larger 60-gun ship under command of Spanish pirate Luis del Toro, partly for loot but also believing him responsible for the death of Kit's mother, Jeanne Buoyant.

A female pirate who calls herself Captain Rouge wears a disguise as a Dutch maid in order to board a vessel. The Hawk lends her his flintlock pistol to defend herself in her cabin at night, but she shoots and wounds Kit when he attempts romantic advances. Rouge escapes through the window and swims to an island.

After several battles against Spanish ships, Kit takes a prisoner named Bianca who is betrothed to del Toro, and he begins a love affair with her. He demands 10,000 pieces of gold for her safe return. Del Toro pays but then surrounds Kit with three of his ships to recover the payment. Kit floats a raft of gunpowder out to the ships in the night and destroys one. However, when he tries to escape, he is captured.

Rouge wants half of the loot for herself. In a raid of Jamaica on the orders of the king, Kit discovers that the property once belonged to Rouge, who is really British subject Lady Jane Golfin, and she is trying to retrieve the riches that have been illegally taken from her family.

Kit breaches the Spanish fortress to destroy it, hoping for the help of Bianca, who resides there, but he is captured. Del Toro reveals to Bianca that he is Kit's father and that the death of his mother was an accident.

Kit is tried, convicted and sentenced to hang. Rouge appears and confronts Bianca. Rouge disguises herself as a man and manages to reach Kit's prison cell. The Sea Flower and multiple French ships attack the fortress. Kit finds the gunpowder store and destroys the fortress. Del Toro is taken prisoner and father and son are reunited. Kit declares his love for Rouge.

== Cast ==
- Sterling Hayden as Kit "The Hawk" Gerardo
- Rhonda Fleming as Captain Rouge
- Helena Carter as Blanca de Valdiva
- John Sutton as Captain Luis del Toro
- Paul Cavanagh as Jeremy Smithers
- Michael Ansara as Bernardo Díaz
- Raymond Hatton as Barnaby Stoll
- Alex Montoya as Homado
- Poppy del Vando as Doña Elena
- Albert Pollet as Governor Ducasse
- David Bond as Prosecutor
- Donna Martell as Emilie Savonez
- Mary Munday as Maria
- Franklyn Farnum as Spanish Tribunal Judge
- Tommy Farrell as Spanish Captain
- Stanley Blystone as Pirate Lookout
- Suzanne Ridgway as Native Girl
- Amapola Del Vando as Senora del Toro

== Production ==
Frank Yerby's novel, also titled The Golden Hawk, was published in 1948. The book became a bestseller, selling 1,863,000 copies. In 1951, it was announced that Sterling Hayden and Rhonda Fleming would star in the film adaptation.

== Reception ==
In a contemporary review for The New York Times, critic Bosley Crowther wrote: "A deal of the sort of blood and thunder that is standard in sword-and-romance films is spewed in this Technicolored gee-gaw turned out by Columbia. ... [T]he product is rambling and confusing, just people milling around in bright costumes."

== See also ==
- Sterling Hayden filmography
