= Captain Rebel =

1956 novel

- 1957 British edition
- Author: Frank Yerby
- Language: English
- Genre: Historical romance
- Publisher: Dial Press
- Publication date: 1956
- Publication place: United States
- Media type: Print
- Pages: 343

Captain Rebel is a 1956 historical novel by the American writer Frank Yerby. It was one of his less critically acclaimed novels, part of a trend that saw his populist novels draw increasingly less favorable reviews despite their success with readers. Like many of his works it is set in the nineteenth century American South.

== Synopsis ==
The story follows the life of Tyler Meredith, the son of a Louisiana plantation owner, from his pre-American Civil War life as a New Orleans rake. During the war he acts as a blockade runner and is later threatened with prosecution by the Union authorities following the fall of the city. He is drawn in two different directions romantically, towards the white Valerie who offers a respectable marriage and his mixed race mistress Lauriel. Ultimately his feelings for the latter lead him to abandon his inherited notions about slavery and race, and following the war he establishes a school for black children.

== Bibliography ==
- Hill, James Lee. Anti-heroic Perspectives: The Life and Works of Frank Yerby. University of Iowa, 1976.
- Kaser, James A. The New Orleans of Fiction: A Research Guide. Scarecrow Press, 2014.
- Tracy, Steven C. Writers of the Black Chicago Renaissance. University of Illinois Press, 2011.
