= All the Brothers Were Valiant (1923 film) =

1923 film by Irvin Willat

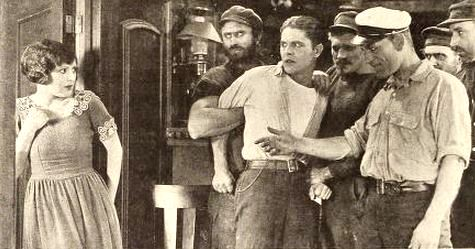
- Billie Dove, Malcolm McGregor, and Lon Chaney in the mutiny scene
- Directed by: Irvin Willat
- Screenplay by: Julien Josephson
- Based on: All the Brothers Were Valiant; 1919 novel by Ben Ames Williams
- Starring: Lon Chaney; Malcolm McGregor; Billie Dove; Robert McKim
- Cinematography: Robert Kurrle
- Production company: Metro Pictures Corporation
- Distributed by: Metro Pictures Corporation
- Release date: January 15, 1923
- Running time: 101 mins. (7 reels)
- Country: United States
- Language: Silent (English intertitles)

All the Brothers Were Valiant is a 1923 American silent sea adventure and romantic drama film starring Lon Chaney. The film was produced and distributed by Metro Pictures corporation and directed by Irvin Willat. The cast also features Malcolm McGregor, Billie Dove and Robert McKim. The screenplay was written by Julien Josephson, based on the eponymous novel by Ben Ames Williams. The film was also known as Cold Courage.

All the Brothers Were Valiant was remade by MGM as Across to Singapore in 1928 with Ernest Torrance playing Chaney's role, and in 1953 again as All the Brothers Were Valiant with Stewart Granger in the Chaney role. A still exists on the internet showing Chaney as Mark Shore, and another showing the mutiny scene. Chaney disliked his co-stars on this film, calling Malcolm McGregor a "dumb bell" and saying of Billie Dove "she's all beauty and no brains".

Portions of it were shot on location in San Francisco. Two real whaling ships were used in the making of the film, the 65-foot Port Saunders and the 165-foot Carolyn Frances. The film is now considered lost, destroyed in the 1965 MGM vault fire. A 2-minute fragment is said to exist in a Netherlands museum.

== Plot ==
Mark Shore, the elder brother of Joel, was captain of a whaling schooner called the "Nathan Ross", but when his ship returned to port from a trip to the Gilbert Islands, he was no longer aboard. Joel, who was working on another ship at the time, asks to be transferred to his brother's ship for a 3-year sojourn so that he can try to locate him. The request is granted and Joel takes his brother's place on the "Nathan Ross".

Before he sets sail, he marries Priscilla Holt and takes his bride with him on the journey. While his family history shows that all of their men-folk were brave and courageous, Priscilla thinks that her husband is really a coward at heart. Priscilla rapidly gets bored with sailing, and the smell of cooking whale blubber makes her sick to her stomach.

Joel finds his brother Mark who suddenly hops aboard the ship one night as it rounds Cape Horn. Mark explains that he was drinking heavily that night and the ship left port without him. Mark makes advances toward Joel's wife, and she complains to her husband. Mark tries to get Joel to change course and go with him to retrieve a cache of valuable pearls that he hid on an island, but Joel refuses. Mark incites the crew to mutiny by spreading rumors of the hidden treasure. Joel keeps order for a while but is soon overpowered and tied up. Aaron Burnham, the ship's carpenter, remains loyal to Joel and manages to release him from captivity.

Mark realizes his mistake and tries to call off the mutiny, but in the melee, he is hit on the head and falls into the sea. Joel jumps in and tries to rescue him, but Mark disappears below the surface before he can reach him. The mutiny is quelled and Priscilla realizes her husband is a true hero after all. At the end, Joel writes in the ship's logbook "All the brothers were valiant."

== Cast ==
- Malcolm McGregor as Joel Shore
- Billie Dove as Priscilla Holt
- Lon Chaney as Mark Shore
- William Orlamond as Aaron Burnham, the ship's carpenter
- Robert McKim as Finch
- Bob Kortman as Vorde
- Otto Brower as Morrell
- Curt Rehfeld as Hooper
- William V. Mong as the Cook
- Leo Willis as Tom
- Shannon Day as The Brown Girl (Mark's native girlfriend)
- Ted Billings as Crew Member
- Gwendolynne D'Amour

== Reception ==
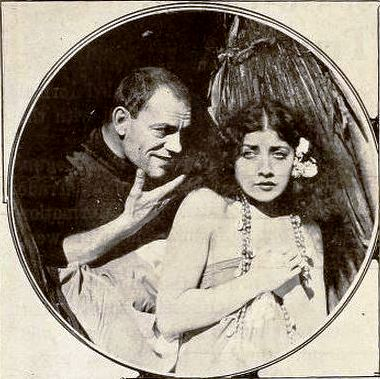
Still from Exhibitor's Trade Review

"Metro has converted Ben Ames Williams' story into a splendid sea picture.... It is an attraction that will be enthusiastically received by men, and because of its romantic interest will appeal to many women...Lon Chaney gives the most striking performance of the production. As the bragging husky of the seas, he is most convincing and gets a slightly humorous meaning out of his role. The character is a particularly human one." — Moving Picture World

"It is one of the best sea pictures that has come on the screen recently and should give entire satisfaction wherever shown. Lon Chaney is excellent as Mark Shore, the elder brother." — Exhibitor's Trade Review

"This is a whaling good story, though over long. Most of the action is on board ship, and there is some good saltwater atmosphere. Both of the brothers are valiant. Malcolm McGregor is a likeable hero. And the other, Lon Chaney, is most villainous!" — Photoplay

"A delightful adventurous tale of the water... The picture is a first rate entertainment of its kind and should please a great many. Lon Chaney gives his usual splendid performance." — Film Daily
