= The Unconquered (novel) =

1953 novel by Ben Ames Williams

- First edition
- Author: Ben Ames Williams
- Publisher: Houghton Mifflin
- Publication date: 1953
- Publication place: United States
- Pages: 689
- OCLC: 1048756

The Unconquered is a 1953 novel by Ben Ames Williams. It was Williams's final novel, completed in January 1953 less than a month before his death. It is a sequel to House Divided.
