= Marguerite Steen =

British writer

Marguerite Steen FRSL
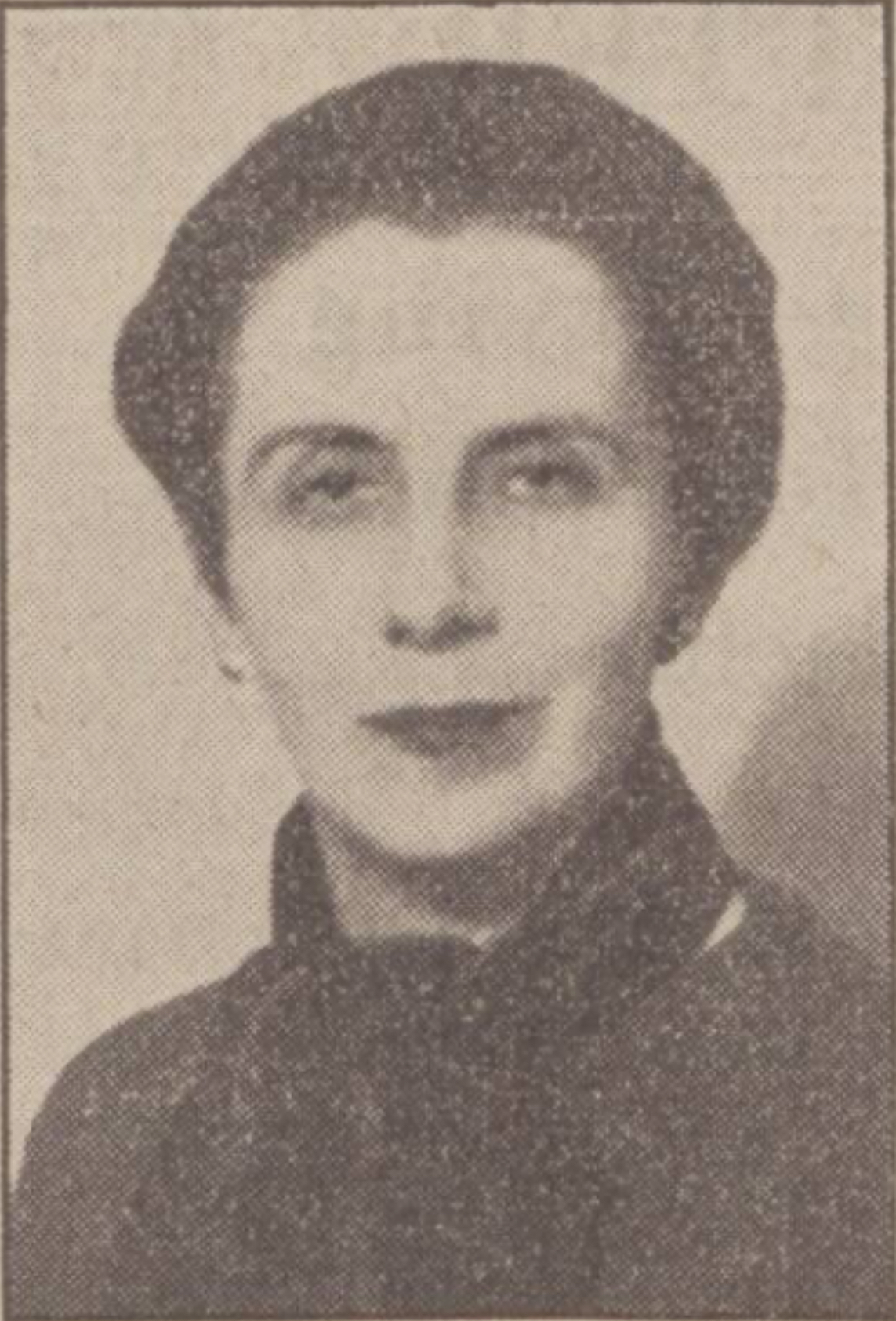
- Steen in the Liverpool Daily Post (1939)
- Born: 12 May 1894; Liverpool, England
- Died: 4 August 1975 (aged 81)
- Occupation: Writer
- Writing career
- Genres: Fiction, biography, drama
- Notable work: The Sun is My Undoing

Marguerite Steen FRSL (12 May 1894 – 4 August 1975) was a British writer, most popular in the 1930s and 1940s. In 1951, she was elected a Fellow of the Royal Society of Literature.

== Life ==
The daughter of Capt. George Connolly Benson, of the King's Shropshire Light Infantry and who was killed in action in Ashanti in 1900, and Margaret Jones, who married shortly before Benson's death, Marguerite was adopted by Joseph and Margaret Steen.

Educated at a private school and subsequently, with much more success, at Kendal High School, at 19 she became a teacher in a private school. After three years she abandoned that career and went to London to fulfil her ambition of working in the theatre. Failing to gain entry to the theatrical world, she accepted instead an offer to teach dance in Yorkshire schools. This earned her a comfortable living (rising to over £500 a year) which enabled her to spend long periods travelling in France and Spain—the latter becoming her adopted homeland.

In 1921, she joined the Fred Terry / Julia Neilson drama company, at £3 per week, and spent three years touring with them. She was befriended by Ellen Terry, and when she found herself unemployed in 1926, took her advice and wrote a novel (not her first, strictly speaking, as she had made an attempt at the age of 8). This work, The Gilt Cage, was published in 1927, and was followed by some 40 more books.

Very much at home among creative people, she wrote biographies of the Terrys, of her friend Hugh Walpole, of the 18th-century poet and actress (and sometime mistress to the George IV) Mary 'Perdita' Robinson, and of her own lover, the artist Sir William Nicholson. According to Steen's account in Looking Glass, they met in Andalucia in May 1935, and by mid-June were living together at Nicholson's mews studio in Apple Tree Yard, off Jermyn Street. Nicholson had been separated from his second wife Edith Stuart-Wortley for some years, but they remained on good terms; although Edie promised to give him a divorce, she never did so. Steen had a fair artistic talent herself, as evidenced by the illustrations in Oakfield Plays, and in a surviving watercolour sketch of Ellen Terry in the V&A. In the 1930s she wrote several plays, but her forte was the historical novel.

Steen's first major success was Matador (1934), for which she drew on her love of Spain, and of bullfighting. This was picked up by both the Book Society in Britain, and the Book of the Month Club in the US. Also a best-seller on both sides of the Atlantic was her massive saga of the slave-trade and Bristol shipping, The Sun Is My Undoing (1941); this was the first part of a trilogy, but the remaining volumes were far less popular. Though never quite accepted by literary critics- Sun..., for example, was described as "vigorous but tinselly"- she was elected a Fellow of the Royal Society of Literature in 1951. Her two volumes of autobiography, Looking Glass (1966) and Pier Glass (1968) offer some delightful views of the English creative set from the 1920s to the 1950s. The Sun Is My Undoing was dramatised for radio by Brian Gear, and broadcast in five parts on BBC Radio 4 in 1973.

Steen's literary agent was A.M. Heath of Holborn, London. The present-day agency recalls her as follows: "Marguerite Steen, whose 1934 novel Matador was one of the agency’s biggest successes to date, would publish more than thirty novels in her career – but, after her death, would have to wait until the emergence of e-books and new markets in the 21st century to be rediscovered."

Her home at the time of her death was the cottage she had shared with Nicholson during the last years of his life, in the village of Blewbury, Berkshire, bought after their London home was destroyed by a Second World War bomb.

== Published works ==
The published works of Marguerite Steen include:

=== Novels ===
- The Gilt Cage, London: Geoffrey Bles (1926)
- Duel in the Dark, London: Geoffrey Bles (1928)
- The Reluctant Madonna, London: Cassell & Co. (1929)
- They that Go Down, London: Cassell & Co. (1930)
- When the Wind Blows, London: Cassell & Co. (1931)
- Unicorn, London: Victor Gollancz (1931)
- The Wise and the Foolish Virgins, London: Victor Gollancz (1932)
- Stallion, London: Victor Gollancz (1933)
- Spider, London: Victor Gollancz (1933)
- Matador, London: Victor Gollancz (1934)
- Return of a Heroine, London: Victor Gollancz (1936)
- Who Would Have Daughters?, London: Collins (1937)
- The Marriage Will Not Take Place, London: Collins (1938)
- Family Ties, London: Collins (1939)
- "A Kind of Insolence" and other stories, London: Collins (1940)
- The Sun is My Undoing, London: Collins (1941)
- Shelter (as Jane Nicholson), London: G. G. Harrap & Co. (1941)
- Rose Timson, London: Collins (1946) - published in the U.S. as Bell Timson
- The One-Eyed Moon, London: Falcon Press (1949)
- Twilight on the Floods, London: Collins (1949)
- The Swan, with illustrations by Walter Goetz, London: Rupert Hart-Davis (1951)
- Phoenix Rising (1952). (Perhaps Bath: Chivers)
- Stallion, London: Falcon Press (1953)
- Anna Fitzalan, London: Collins (1953)
- Bulls of Parral, London: Collins (1954)
- The Unquiet Spirit, London: Collins (1955)
- The Woman in the Back Seat, London: Collins (1959)
- The Tower, London: Collins (1959)
- A Candle in the Sun, London: Longmans (1964)
- The Tavern, London: Nicholas Vane (1964)

=== Biography ===
- Hugh Walpole: A Study, [S.l.]: Ivor Nicholson and Watson (1933)
- The Lost One: A Biography of Mary Perdita Robinson, [S.l.]: Methuen and Co Ltd (1937)
- William Nicholson, London: Collins (1943)
- A Pride of Terrys, London: Longmans (1962)
- Looking Glass: An Autobiography, London: Longmans (1966)
- Pier Glass: More Autobiography, London: Longmans (1968)

=== Plays ===
- Oakfield Plays: Including the Inglemere Christmas play, London: Ivor Nicholson and Watson (1932)
- Peepshow, London: I. Nicholson & Watson (1933)
- French for Love: a comedy in three acts, with Derek Patmore. London: Collins (1940)

=== Belles lettres ===
- Granada Window, [S.l.]: [s.n.] (1949).
- Little White King (on cats), London: Michael Joseph (1956).

=== Contributor ===
- Paintings and drawings of the gypsies of Granada. Jo Jones, with text by Augustus John, Laurie Lee, Sir Sacheverell Sitwell, Walter Starkie, Marguerite Steen. London: Athelnay Books (1969).

=== Short stories ===
- "Strange Guest", The Strand Magazine (March 1933), pp. 270–281.

=== Illustration ===
- Oakfield Plays: Including the Inglemere Christmas play, London: Ivor Nicholson and Watson (1932)
- Racing without Tears. Caroline Ramsden. London: Rupert Hart-Davis (1952). (This ran to many editions, with later ones illustrated by Norman Thelwell rather than Steen)
