= Betta St. John =

American actress (1929–2023)

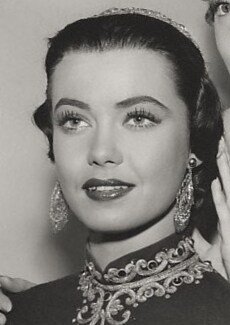
- In Dream Wife (1953).
- Born: Betty Jean Striegler; November 26, 1929; Hawthorne, California, U.S.
- Died: June 23, 2023 (aged 93); Brighton, England
- Occupations: Actress; singer; dancer
- Years active: 1938–1965
- Known for: High Tide at Noon
- Notable work: Dream Wife
- Spouse: Peter Grant (m. 1952; died 1992)
- Children: 3

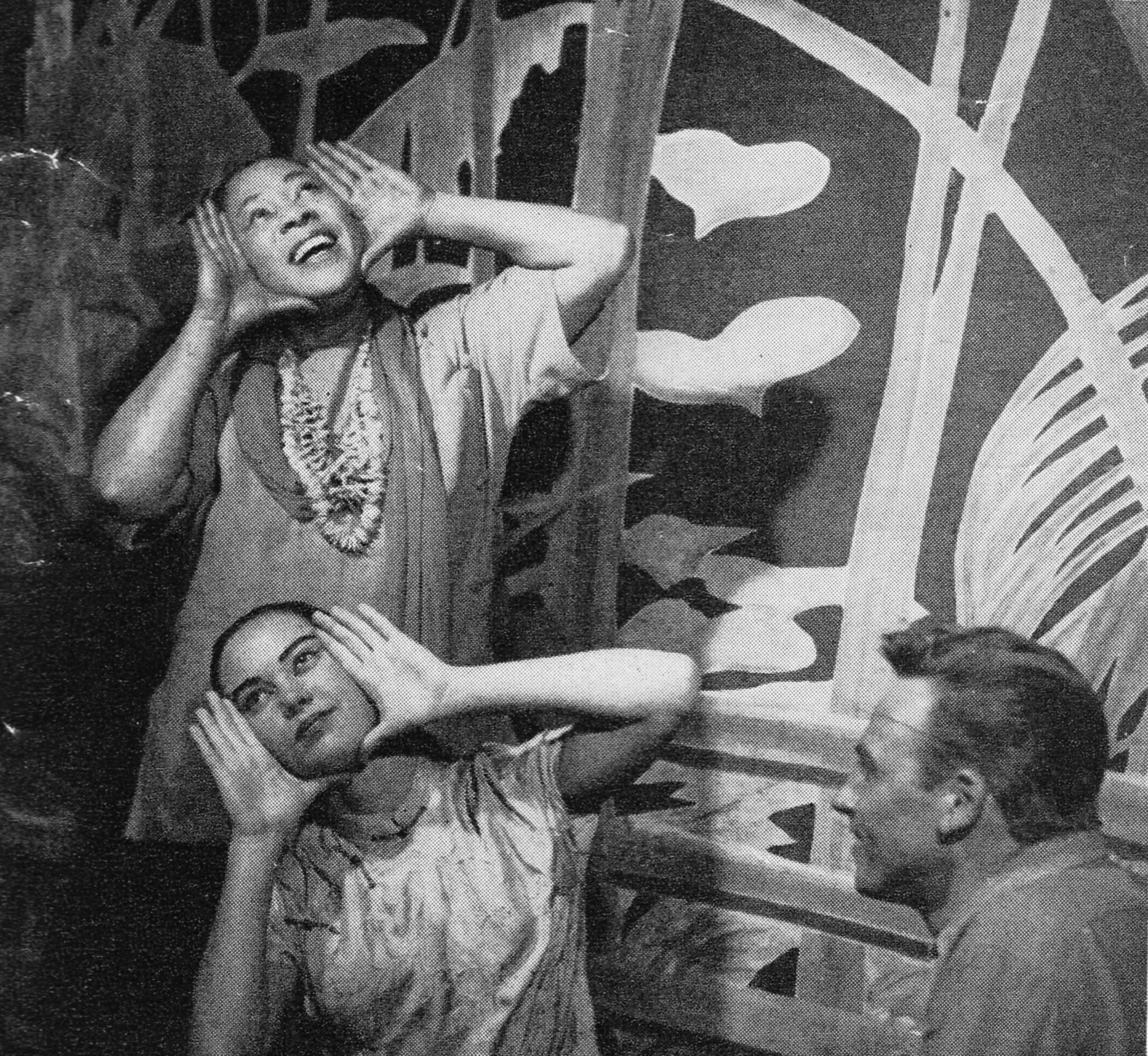
From top: Juanita Hall as Bloody Mary singing "Happy Talk", Betta St. John as Liat, and William Tabbert as Lt. Cable in the original Broadway cast of South Pacific (1950)

Betta St. John (born Betty Jean Striegler, November 26, 1929 – June 23, 2023) was an American actress, singer, and dancer who worked on Broadway, the West End, and in Hollywood films. She started her career aged 10 as a child actress in uncredited movie parts in her native USA. As an adult actress her first starring role was in the MGM film Dream Wife opposite Cary Grant in 1953. In 1954 she starred with Victor Mature in Dangerous Mission. After moving to England she appeared in starring roles in British films including High Tide at Noon, two Tarzan films, and the horror features Corridors of Blood with Boris Karloff and Horror Hotel with Christopher Lee.

She was an inductee into the Hawthorne Hall of Fame in 2019.

== Biography ==
Betty Jean Striegler was born in Hawthorne, California, on November 26, 1929. St. John, alongside Shirley Temple, was part of the Meglin Kiddies troupe of actors, singers, and dancers.

St. John made her film debut at age ten in an uncredited part in Destry Rides Again (1939) starring James Stewart and Marlene Dietrich. She then played an orphan in Jane Eyre (1943), starring Orson Welles and Joan Fontaine, also uncredited.

St. John played a small role in the Rodgers and Hammerstein Broadway musical Carousel from 1945 until 1947. She was a member of the show's touring company until 1949. Later that year, she created the role of Liat in the musical South Pacific, first on Broadway and then London.

St. John appeared in the 1953 films The Robe, Dream Wife, and All the Brothers Were Valiant, as well as 1954's The Student Prince.

Betta St. John starred in two Tarzan films the first in 1957 Tarzan and the Lost Safari which was the first Tarzan film to be filmed in colour, she returned to the franchise in Tarzan the Magnificent in 1960.

She continued to act in films and appear in TV series until 1965 before leaving the entertainment industry.

St. John was married to English actor Peter Grant from 1952 until his death in 1992. They had three children.

Betta St. John died at an assisted living facility in Brighton, England, on June 23, 2023, at the age of 93.

== Filmography ==
Year	Title	Role	Note
1939	Destry Rides Again	Singing Girl in Wagon	Uncredited
1940	Waldo's Last Stand	Top Dancer	Short
1941	Lydia	Blind Orphan	Uncredited
1943	Jane Eyre	Girl	Uncredited
1953	The Robe	Miriam	
1953	Dream Wife	Tarji	
1953	All the Brothers Were Valiant	Native Girl	
1954	Dangerous Mission	Mary Tiller	
1954	The Law vs. Billy the Kid	Nita Maxwell	
1954	The Student Prince	Princess Johanna	
1954	The Saracen Blade	Iolanthe Rogliano	
1955	The Naked Dawn	Maria Lopez	
1955	Alias John Preston	Sally Sandford	
1957	High Tide at Noon	Joanna	
1957	Tarzan and the Lost Safari	Diana Penrod	
1958	Corridors of Blood	Susan	
1958	The Snorkel	Jean Edwards	
1960	Tarzan the Magnificent	Fay Ames	
1960	The City of the Dead (film)	Patricia Russell	aka Horror Hotel
