= A Woman Called Fancy =

1951 novel

- Author: Frank Yerby
- Language: English
- Genre: Drama
- Publisher: Dial Press
- Publication date: 1951
- Publication place: United States
- Media type: Print

A Woman Called Fancy is a 1951 historical novel by the American writer Frank Yerby. The book's dedication page simply states "For my mother." A Woman Called Fancy was included in fifth place on the Publishers Weekly list of bestselling novels of 1951.

== Synopsis ==
Fancy grows up in the Appalachian Mountains of South Carolina in the late nineteenth century. When she is nineteen she runs away from home to escape an arranged marriage. She ends up in Augusta, Georgia, where she enjoys a series of romances.

== Bibliography ==
- Andrews, William L., Foster, Frances Smith and Harris, Trudier. The Concise Oxford Companion to African American Literature. Oxford University Press, 2001.
- Farr, Sidney Saylor. Appalachian Women: An Annotated Bibliography. University Press of Kentucky, 2021.
- Korda, Michael. Making the List: A Cultural History of the American Bestseller, 1900–1999 : as Seen Through the Annual Bestseller Lists of Publishers Weekly. Barnes & Noble Publishing, 2001.
