= Russell Janney =

American novelist

Russell Janney (April 14, 1884 – July 14, 1963) was an American theatrical producer and author. He is best known for his 1946 best-selling book and first novel, The Miracle of the Bells, which was made into a film of the same name in 1948. He also produced and co-authored the 1925 musical The Vagabond King, working with Brian Hooker and composer Rudolf Friml.

Janney also produced other plays including Marjolaine (1922) (based on Pomander Walk by Louis N. Parker), White Eagle (1927) (based on Edwin Milton Royle's The Squaw Man), June Love, Ballyhoo (1927), and an adaption of The O'Flynn (1934) by Justin Huntly McCarthy. His second novel, So Long As Love Remembers, was published in 1953, and the short novel Curtain Call followed in 1957.

Janney was born in Wilmington, Ohio and graduated from Yale University in 1906. While at college, he put on plays for his fraternity, Beta Theta Pi. He died of natural causes at his apartment in New York City on July 14, 1963.

Janney also served as a juror in a high-profile 1949 trial, one of the Smith Act trials of Communist Party leaders.

Janney married Edith Hulda Cramer in 1907; they later divorced. Their son William Janney was a film actor in the 1930s.
