= The Dawning of the Day (novel) =

1954 novel written by Elisabeth Ogilvie

- Author: Elisabeth Ogilvie
- Cover artist: Arthur Hawkins Jr.
- Language: English
- Publisher: Down East
- Publication date: 1954
- Publication place: United States
- Media type: Print (hardback)
- Preceded by: Rowan Head

The Dawning of the Day is an American romantic novel written by Elisabeth Ogilvie and first published in 1954. The novel is the second Ogilvie's Bennett Island Family series of novels and forms the first part of her "Lover's Trilogy."

== Plot summary ==
Philippa Marshall, a young war widow, takes up the mantle of new school teacher on Bennett Island, a fictional lobster-fishing community on the coast of Maine. Her work leads to a romance with the handsome son of one of the town's leading families.
