= Alonzo Smythe Yerby =

American physician and academic (1921–1994)

Alonzo Yerby
- Born: Alonzo Smythe Yerby; October 14, 1921; Augusta, Georgia, U.S.
- Died: February 16, 1994 (aged 72); Jamaica Plain, Boston, Massachusetts, U.S.
- Education: University of Chicago (BS); Meharry Medical College (MD); Harvard School of Public Health (MPH)
- Occupations: Physician, public health doctor, medical educator
- Spouse: Monteal May Yerby
- Children: 3

Alonzo Yerby (October 14, 1921 – February 16, 1994) was an American physician and academic who served as the Associate Dean of the Harvard School of Public Health in Boston. He previously served as New York City Hospitals Commissioner, as a department head and professor at the Harvard School of Public Health.

He was the first Black chairman of a department at the public health school, and the first Black New York City Hospitals Commissioner, heading the city's hospitals department. He is the namesake of the Harvard Chan Yerby Fellowship Program at the Harvard T.H. Chan School of Public Health.

== Early life and education ==
Yerby was born in Augusta, Georgia, on October 15, 1921, to Rufus Garvin Yerby and Wilhelmina Ethel Yerby (née Smythe). He earned a Bachelor of Science degree from the University of Chicago in 1941, and served in the United States Army during World War II. Yerby then earned his M.D. from Meharry Medical College in 1946, followed by his Master of Public Health from the Harvard School of Public Health in 1948. One of his siblings was the writer Frank Yerby.

== Career ==
While serving in the Army during World War II, Yerby was a member of the United States Public Health Service Commissioned Corps. In 1949, he became Deputy Chief of Medical Affairs in the Office of the Allied High Commission.

After graduating from the Harvard School of Public Health, Yerby held administrative posts in New York's Department of Health and Welfare. He later served as the New York City Commissioner of Hospitals, appointed by Mayor Robert F. Wagner and reappointed in 1966 by Mayor John Lindsay. From 1966 to 1982, Yerby was a professor of Health Services Administration at the Harvard School of Public Health.

Yerby is credited with helping craft the Medicare program with Rashi Fein of Harvard Medical School.

1980 and 1981, he served as Deputy Assistant Secretary for Intergovernmental Affairs in the United States Department of Health and Human Services, serving under Secretary Patricia Roberts Harris at the end of the Carter Administration.

From 1982 to 1989, he served as a professor of medicine at the Uniformed Services University of the Health Sciences.

== Honors ==
Yerby was a member of the Institute of Medicine of the National Academy of Sciences and the New York Academy of Medicine. He is credited with several African American 'firsts' in public health and health services administration.

== Personal life ==
Yerby married Monteal May in 1943. They had three children: Mark S. Yerby, Lynne E. Yerby, and Kris Yerby.

Yerby died in Jamaica Plain, Massachusetts, on February 16, 1994, at the age of 72 and was buried in the Arlington National Cemetery.
