= Maurice Ransford =

American art director (1896–1968)

- Born: August 3, 1896; Terre Haute, Indiana
- Died: August 25, 1968 (aged 72); San Diego
- Occupation: Art director
- Years active: 1940-1961

Maurice Ransford (August 3, 1896 – August 25, 1968) was an American art director. He was nominated for three Academy Awards in the category Best Art Direction. He was born in Terre Haute, Indiana and died in San Diego.

== Selected filmography ==
Ransford was nominated for three Academy Awards for Best Art Direction:

- Leave Her to Heaven (1945)
- The Foxes of Harrow (1947)
- Titanic (1953)
