= All the Brothers Were Valiant =

1953 film by Richard Thorpe

- Theatrical release poster
- Directed by: Richard Thorpe
- Written by: Harry Brown
- Based on: All the Brothers Were Valiant; 1919 novel by Ben Ames Williams
- Produced by: Pandro S. Berman
- Starring: Robert Taylor; Stewart Granger; Ann Blyth; Betta St. John; Keenan Wynn; James Whitmore
- Cinematography: George J. Folsey
- Edited by: Ferris Webster
- Music by: Miklós Rózsa
- Production company: Metro-Goldwyn-Mayer
- Distributed by: Loew's Inc.
- Release date: 13 November 1953
- Running time: 95 minutes 101 minutes (US)
- Country: United States
- Language: English
- Budget: $1,816,000
- Box office: $4,628,000

All the Brothers Were Valiant is a 1953 Technicolor adventure drama film produced by Metro-Goldwyn-Mayer and directed by Richard Thorpe. The film's screenplay was written by Harry Brown and based on the 1919 novel All the Brothers Were Valiant by Ben Ames Williams. The music score was led by Miklós Rózsa and the cinematography by George J. Folsey.

The film was made twice before, the silent All the Brothers Were Valiant (1923) starring Lon Chaney and produced by Metro Pictures (a forerunner of MGM), now a lost film; and as the silent Across to Singapore (1928, MGM) which starred Joan Crawford.

== Plot ==
In 1857, Joel Shore (Robert Taylor) returns to New Bedford, Massachusetts, after three years at sea, and learns that his brother Mark (Stewart Granger), captain of the whaling vessel Nathan Ross, was reported missing from his ship months earlier. Ship owner Asa Worthen (Robert Burton) offers the Nathan Ross to Joel, and although he and Mark were not close, Joel accepts and vows to learn more about his brother's fate.

That afternoon, Joel hears a drunken sailor in a pub claim that Mark jumped ship and abandoned his men, and when the sailor's companion confirms the story, Joel strikes him. Later, Joel calls on his captain, Holt (Lewis Stone), and proposes to Holt's granddaughter Priscilla (Ann Blyth). Joel and Priscilla marry and immediately depart for the South Seas on the Nathan Ross. One day, Joel questions mate Aaron Burnham (James Bell) about his brother's disappearance, and Aaron replies that Mark had been drinking heavily and fighting a severe fever when he left the ship.

After six months at sea, the ship approaches the island of Tubuai. While they are anchored offshore, Joel comes up from below deck and discovers Mark on board. The two brothers establish an uneasy rapport, and that evening, Priscilla overhears Mark tell Joel about the night he left the ship --- Drunk and ravaged by fever, Mark dives overboard and swims to shore, lured by the sound of the native drums. After Mark collapses, he is nursed back to health by a beautiful native woman, whom he marries in an island ceremony.

One night, Mark awakens to the sound of gunfire, and discovers that his wife has been kidnapped by several white men. Mark swims to the sloop and kills the man who is trying to rape his wife, but then collapses. Mark and his wife remain barricaded in the ship's cabin while the other two men, Quint (Kurt Kasznar) and Fetcher (James Whitmore), bide their time on deck. When Mark recovers his strength, he confronts Quint and Fetcher at gunpoint, and agrees to join them in their next pearling expedition.

One day, while examining their haul, Quint comes across a valuable black pearl, and Fetcher murders him for it. Several weeks later, they stop at a small island to pick fruit, and Fetcher murders their two native divers, then tries to kill Mark. Mark chokes Fetcher to death, but as he and his wife are leaving the island, they are attacked by natives. Mark's wife is killed by a native's spear, and Mark accidentally drops the bag containing a fortune in pearls into the lagoon.

Back aboard the Nathan Ross, Mark tells Joel he intends to go back for the pearls. Fearing the hostile natives, Joel refuses to join him, and instructs Mark not to mention the pearls to the men. Mark nonetheless tells one of the mates, and word of the sunken treasure soon spreads throughout the crew. Later, Mark tells Joel that he might have married Priscilla himself, and intimates that he can take her away. Mark then plants doubts in Priscilla's mind about Joel's courage.

One night, Mark and some of the mates announce that they will go after the pearls, and Mark demands that Joel turn over his guns. Interpreting Joel's lack of resistance as a sign of cowardice, Priscilla is ashamed of her husband, and as Mark comforts her, they kiss. Joel assembles the men and tells them they will not search for the pearls, proposing instead that he and Mark return to Tubuai and fight a duel.

Mark then seizes control of the ship and has Joel taken prisoner. Joel escapes and, after ordering Mark to end the mutiny, throws all their firearms overboard. The angry crew attacks and Mark --- determined not to have his brother's blood on his hands --- is forced to fight on Joel's side. Mark is killed during the brawl, impaled by a whaling harpoon.

Later, Joel writes in his captain's log that although Mark instigated the mutiny, he later regretted his actions and defended the ship. With their troubles behind them, Joel and Priscilla reconcile and kiss.

== Cast ==
- Robert Taylor as Joel Shore
- Stewart Granger as Mark Shore
- Ann Blyth as Priscilla 'Pris' Holt
- Betta St. John as Native Girl
- Keenan Wynn as Silva
- James Whitmore as Fetcher
- Kurt Kasznar as Quint
- Lewis Stone as Captain Holt
- Robert Burton as Asa Worthen
- Peter Whitney as James Finch, First Mate
- John Lupton as Dick Morrell, Third Mate
- Jonathan Cott as Carter
- Mitchell Lewis as Cook
- James Bell as Aaron Burnham
- Leo Gordon as Peter How

== Production ==
MGM bought the rights to the novel in 1936. Following the success of Captains Courageous, the studio announced that it would produce the film, to star Robert Taylor and Spencer Tracy. However, plans were postponed.

In November 1951, the film was reactivated as a vehicle for Taylor and Stewart Granger. Elizabeth Taylor was originally announced for the female lead.

Filming began on location in Jamaica in early 1953 with Granger and Betta St. John. While the unit was on location, Elizabeth Taylor, who had just given birth, was replaced by Ann Blyth.

Granger later called the film a "crappy melodrama" but admitted: "I had an OK villain's part." He said that the studio forced him to take the role instead of that which he truly wanted, the lead in Mogambo. He claimed that he had been promised the Mogambo role but that Dore Schary had reneged and given the role to Clark Gable. Granger enjoyed working with Robert Taylor, saying that Taylor "was the easiest person to work with but he had been entirely emasculated by the MGM brass who insisted that he was only a pretty face. He was convinced he wasn't really a good actor and his calm acceptance of this stigma infuriated me. He was such a nice guy, Bob, but he had even more hang-ups than I had."

Lewis Stone died six months after completing filming.

== Reception ==
The film received an Academy Award nomination for Best Color Cinematography (George J. Folsey).

In a contemporary review for The New York Times, critic Bosley Crowther panned the film: "What it all boils down to, in essence, is a lot of pseudo-salty South Seas whoop-de-do, put together with little distinction and without going off the studio lot."

=== Box office ===
According to MGM records, the film earned $2,004,000 at the North American box office and $2,624,000 elsewhere. It recorded a profit of $958,000.

In France, the film recorded admissions of 1,909,704.

=== Proposed follow-up ===
In July 1953, MGM announced that it had optioned Black Pawl, another sailing adventure novel written by Ben Ames Williams. Although MGM intended the film as a follow-up to All the Brothers Were Valiant and planned to again cast Robert Taylor and Stewart Granger, the project did not come to fruition.
