= Elisabeth Ogilvie =

American novelist (1917–2006)

Elisabeth M. Ogilvie (May 20, 1917 – September 9, 2006) was an American novelist. Ogilvie is best known for writing a series of novels set on islands off the coast of Maine, where she lived as an adult. She died in Cushing, Maine, at the age of 89.

== Early life and education ==
Ogilvie was born in Boston on May 20, 1917, to Frank and Maude Ogilvie. She had three older brothers. Growing up, Ogilvie spent summers on the Maine island of Criehaven. She was raised in Dorchester and Wollaston, and she graduated from North Quincy High School in 1934. Ogilvie did not earn a college degree, but took a writing course at Harvard.

== Career ==
Ogilvie published her first novel, High Tide at Noon in 1944, which was the first of eight novels in the Bennett's Island series. She modeled the setting on Criehaven, the Maine island where she spent summers growing up.

Ogilvie wrote 46 adult, young adult, and children's books. Many of her novels dealt with life in Maine and lobstering families along the coast. She also wrote a series of novels set in Scotland, inspired by her Scottish descent and her travels there. In 1950, Ogilvie published an autobiographical book, My World is an Island, about her life on Gay Island.

== Personal life ==
In 1944, Ogilvie moved to a 33-acre (130,000 m^{2}) farm on Gay Island in the town of Cushing, Maine. She lived there for more than 50 years, sharing the house with her longtime companion and friend Dorothy Simpson (1905–1998), and Simpson's husband, Guy.

== Death ==
Ogilvie died of a stroke on September 9, 2006 in Cushing, Maine.

== Works published ==
=== Series ===
Bennett Island Family

Tide Trilogy

1. High Tide at Noon (1944, Thorndike Press, ISBN 0-7838-8554-7)
2. The Storm Tide (1945, Thorndike Press, ISBN 0-7838-8800-7)
3. Ebbing Tide (1947, Thorndike Press, ISBN 0-7838-8801-5)

Lover's Trilogy

1. Dawning of the Day (1954, Down East, ISBN 0-89272-464-1)
2. The Seasons Hereafter (1966, Down East, ISBN 0-89272-465-X)
3. Strawberries in the Sea (1973, Down East, ISBN 0-89272-466-8)

Joanna Bennett's Island

1. An Answer in the Tide (1978, McGraw-Hill, ISBN 0-07-047664-0)
2. Day Before Winter (1997, Down East, ISBN 0-89272-429-3)

Standalone

- Summer of the Osprey (1987, McGraw-Hill, ISBN 0-07-047784-1)

Other Series

Cass Phillips

1. Blueberry Summer (1956, Amereon Ltd, ISBN 0-88411-327-2)
2. The Fabulous Year (1958, Whittlesey House, ISBN 0-401-31181-3)

Mirabelle Taggart

1. Weep and Know Why (1972, McGraw-Hill, ISBN 0-07-047619-5)
2. Dreaming Swimmer (1976, McGraw-Hill, ISBN 0-07-047598-9)

Jennie Trilogy

1. Jennie about to Be (1984, McGraw-Hill, ISBN 0-07-047769-8)
2. World of Jennie G. (1986, McGraw-Hill, ISBN 0-07-047783-3)
3. Jennie Glenroy (1993, Down East, ISBN 0-89272-326-2)

=== Adult novels ===
- Rowan Head (1949, Amereon Ltd, ISBN 0-88411-181-4)
- How Wide the Heart aka Steady Kind of Love (1959, Scholastic)
- Witch Door (1959, Amereon Ltd, ISBN 0-88411-182-2)
- Woman's Reputation (1962, Redbook)
- Call Home the Heart (1962, Aeonian Press, ISBN 0-88411-328-0)
- There May be Heaven (1966, Amereon Ltd, ISBN 0-88411-338-8)
- Waters on a Starry Night (1968, McGraw-Hill)
- Bellwood (1968, McGraw-Hill)
- Theme for Reason (1970, McGraw-Hill, ISBN 0-07-047634-9)
- Image of a Lover (1974, McGraw-Hill, ISBN 0-07-047648-9)
- Where the Lost Aprils Are (1975, McGraw-Hill, ISBN 0-07-047606-3)
- Dancer in Yellow (1979, McGraw-Hill, ISBN 0-07-047600-4)
- The Devil in Tartan (1980, McGraw-Hill, ISBN 0-07-047678-0)
- Silent Ones (1981, McGraw Hill, ISBN 0-07-047679-9)
- Road to Nowhere (1983, McGraw-Hill, ISBN 0-07-047700-0)
- When the Music Stopped (1989, McGraw-Hill, ISBN 0-07-047792-2)

=== Young-adult novels ===
- Whistle for a Wind: Maine 1820 (1954, Amereon Ltd, ISBN 0-88411-340-X)
- The Young Islanders (1960, McGraw-Hill)
- Becky's Island (1961, Amereon Ltd, ISBN 0-88411-326-4)
- Turn Around Twice (1962, Amereon Ltd, ISBN 0-88411-339-6)
- Ceiling of Amber aka Until the End of Summer (1964, Amereon Ltd, ISBN 0-88411-329-9)
- Masquerade at Sea House (1965, Aeonion Press, ISBN 0-88411-333-7)
- Pigeon Pair (1967, TBS The Book Service Ltd, ISBN 0-207-94993-X)
- Come Aboard and Bring Your Dory (1969)
- Face of Innocence (1970, McGraw-Hill)
- Beautiful Girl (1980, Scholastic, ISBN 0-590-31277-4)
- Too Young to Know (1982, Scholastic, 0-590-31710-8)
- A Forgotten Girl...and a Forgotten Time (1982, Scholastic, ISBN 0-590-32544-2)
- My Summer Love (1985, Scholastic, ISBN 0-590-33266-X)

=== Movie Tie-In ===
- Honeymoon (1947, Bart House), novelization of the screenplay by Michael Kanin from a story by Vicki Baum

=== Autobiography ===
- My World is an Island (1950, Down East Books, ISBN 0-89272-288-6)
