= Benton's Row =

1954 novel

- 1956 edition
- Author: Frank Yerby
- Language: English
- Genre: Historical
- Publisher: Dial Press
- Publication date: 1954
- Publication place: United States
- Media type: Print
- Pages: 346

Benton's Row is a 1954 historical novel by the American writer Frank Yerby. It was ranked tenth on the Publishers Weekly list of bestselling novels that year. It was one of several of his books set in nineteenth century Louisiana. It follows the progress of four generations of the Benton family culminating in World War 1.

== Bibliography ==
- Bonner Jr., John W. Bibliography of Georgia Authors, 1949–1965. University of Georgia Press, 2010.
- Davis, Thadious M. Southscapes: Geographies of Race, Region, and Literature. University of North Carolina Press, 2011.
- Korda, Michael. Making the List: A Cultural History of the American Bestseller, 1900–1999 : as Seen Through the Annual Bestseller Lists of Publishers Weekly. Barnes & Noble Publishing, 2001.
