= Frank Yerby =

American novelist (1916–1991)

- Born: Frank Garvin Yerby; September 5, 1916; Augusta, Georgia, United States
- Died: November 29, 1991 (aged 75); Madrid, Spain
- Occupations: Historical novelist
- Spouse(s): Flora Williams; Blanca Calle Perez
- Children: Jacques Yerby, Nikki Yerby, Faune Yerby, Jan Yerby
- Relatives: Alonzo Yerby (brother)

Frank Garvin Yerby (September 5, 1916 – November 29, 1991) was an American writer, best known for his 1946 historical novel The Foxes of Harrow.

== Early life ==
Yerby was born in Augusta, Georgia, on September 5, 1916, the second of four children of Rufus Garvin Yerby (1886–1961), a hotel doorman, and Wilhelmina Ethel Yerby (née Smythe) (1888–1960), a teacher. Yerby's ancestry was Black, White, and Native American. Yerby would later refer to himself as "a young man whose list of ancestors read like a mini-United Nations." One of Yerby's siblings was Alonzo Yerby, Associate Dean of the Harvard School of Public Health in Boston and New York City Hospitals Commissioner.

As a child, Yerby attended Augusta's Haines Institute, a private school for African Americans founded by Lucy Laney, from which he graduated in 1933. In 1937, he graduated from Paine College with a B.A. in English, and earned his M.A. in Dramatic Arts from Fisk University in 1938.

In 1938, he began courses for a doctorate in English at the University of Chicago, but left school for financial reasons in 1939. He was a professor of English at Florida A&M University from 1939 - 1940 and then Southern University in Louisiana from 1940 - 1941, before moving to Detroit and New York, where he worked in wartime defense industries.

He began his literary career while he was a student at Paine College by publishing poetry, starting with the poems "Miracles" and "Brevity" in the September 1934 issue of New Challenge, a literary magazine published by Dorothy West. Two years later, Yerby would publish his first short story, "Salute to the Flag," in the November 1936 issue of The Paineite, the student newspaper of Paine College. He would continue to publish poetry and short stories while he was a student at Paine College and Fisk University. While he was a student at the University of Chicago, he worked for the Federal Writers' Project, writing about religious groups he observed on the south side of Chicago as part of the social history The Negro in Illinois under the supervision of the dancer, choreographer, and anthropologist Katherine Dunham.

Yerby continued to publish short stories and wrote the manuscript of a protest novel, "This is My Own," about a black steel worker turned boxer who comes to a tragic end while he worked in the defense industry. That manuscript was rejected, but the editor Muriel Fuller of Redbook encouraged him to send her something else. He sent her the short story "Health Card." She decided it was unsuitable for Redbook, but she sent it to Harper's, which published it in 1944. "Health Card" won the prestigious O. Henry Memorial Prize for best short story. The success of "Health Card" earned Yerby a book contract with Dial Press. The rejection of "This is My Own" caused Yerby to abandon protest literature in favor of historical fiction.

== Novelist ==
Yerby was originally noted for writing romance novels set in the antebellum South. In mid-century, he began writing a series of best-selling historical novels ranging from the Athens of Pericles to Europe in the Dark Ages. Yerby took considerable pains in research and often end-noted his historical works. In all, he wrote 33 novels.

In 1946, he published The Foxes of Harrow, a Southern historical romance, which became the first novel by an African American to sell more than a million copies. In this work he faithfully reproduced many of the genre's most familiar features, with the notable exception of his representation of African-American characters, who bore little resemblance to the "happy darkies" that appeared in such well-known works as Gone With the Wind (1936). That same year he also became the first African American to have a book purchased for screen adaptation by a Hollywood studio, when 20th Century Fox optioned Foxes. Ultimately, the book became a 1947 film of the same name starring Rex Harrison and Maureen O'Hara which was nominated for the Academy Award for Best Production Design (Lyle R. Wheeler, Maurice Ransford, Thomas Little, Paul S. Fox).

In some quarters, Yerby is best known for his masterpiece The Dahomean (1971). The novel, which focuses on the life of an enslaved African chief's son who is transported to America, serves as the culmination of Yerby's efforts toward incorporating racial themes into his works. Prior to that, Yerby was often criticized by blacks for the lack of focus on African-American characters in his books.

In 2012, The New York Times columnist Nicholas Kristof wrote an article featuring an at-risk child whose life was turned around by reading Yerby books that one of his teachers was secretly providing to him.

== Private life ==
Yerby married Flora Helen Claire Williams (1921 - 2001) in 1941. They had four children. The couple separated in 1955, and their divorce was finalized in 1956.

Yerby left the United States in 1952, in protest against racial discrimination, and moved to Nice, France, for three years. In 1955, he moved to Madrid, Spain where he remained for the rest of his life. Yerby married Blanca Calle-Perez in 1956.

Yerby died from liver cancer in Madrid and was interred there in the Cementerio de la Almudena, the biggest Spanish cemetery.

== Posthumous honors ==
In 2006, Yerby was posthumously inducted into the Georgia Writers Hall of Fame.

In 2013, the Augusta Literary Festival created an award to honor Frank Yerby. This award is given to three fiction authors from a submission pool.

In 2023, the Georgia Historical Society, in partnership with the Lucy Craft Laney Museum of Black History, Haines Alumni Association, and Paine College, erected a Georgia historical marker in Augusta, Georgia recognizing the life and career of Frank Yerby.

== In popular media ==
Uncle Percy in Thomas Mullen's Darktown is partly based on Frank Yerby.

George R. R. Martin cites Frank Yerby as an influence on his own writing.

== Novels ==
- The Foxes of Harrow (1946) (filmed under the same name), the sixth best-selling novel in the US in 1946.
- The Vixens (1947), the fifth best-selling novel in the US in 1947.
- The Golden Hawk (1948) (filmed under the same name)
- Pride's Castle (1949)
- Floodtide (1950)
- A Woman Called Fancy (1951)
- The Saracen Blade (1952) (filmed under the same name)
- The Devil's Laughter (1953)
- Bride of Liberty (1954)
- Benton's Row (1954)
- The Treasure of Pleasant Valley (1955)
- Captain Rebel (1956)
- Fairoaks (1957)
- The Serpent and the Staff (1958, with jacket by George Adamson)
- Jarrett's Jade (1959)
- Gillian (1960)
- The Garfield Honor (1961)
- Griffin's Way (1962)
- The Old Gods Laugh (1964)
- An Odor of Sanctity (1965)
- Goat Song (1967)
- Judas, My Brother (1968)
- Speak Now (1969)
- The Dahomean (1971, later published as The Man from Dahomey)
- The Girl From Storeyville (1972)
- The Voyage Unplanned (1974)
- Tobias and the Angel (1975)
- A Rose for Ana Maria (1976)
- Hail the Conquering Hero (1977)
- A Darkness at Ingraham's Crest (1979)
- Western: A Saga of the Great Plains (1982)
- Devilseed (1984)
- McKenzie's Hundred (1985)

== Short stories ==
- "Salute to the Flag" (The Paineite 16, November, 1936, pp. 4, 13, 23)
- "Love Story" (The Paineite 16, February, 1937, pp. 15 – 16)
- "A Date with Vera" (The Fisk Herald 31, October, 1937, pp. 16 – 17)
- "Young Man Afraid" (The Fisk Herald 31, November, 1937, pp. 10 – 11)
- "The Thunder of God" (The Anvil 1, April–May, 1939, pp. 5 – 8)
- "Health Card" (Harper's 188, May, 1944, pp. 548 – 553)
- "White Magnolias" (Phylon 5, Fourth Quarter, 1944, pp. 319 – 326)
- "Roads Going Down" (Common Ground 5, Summer, 1945, pp. 67 – 72)
- "My Brother Went to College" (Tomorrow 5, January, 1946, pp. 9 – 12)
- "The Homecoming" (Common Ground 6, Spring, 1946, pp. 41 – 47)

Veronica T. Watson published an anthology of Frank Yerby's short stories, The Short Stories of Frank Yerby (2020). It includes five previously published and eleven previously unpublished short stories.

== Poems ==
- "Miracles" (New Challenge 1, September, 1934, p. 27)
- "Brevity" (New Challenge 1, September, 1934, p. 27)
- "To a Seagull" (New Challenge 1, May, 1935, p. 15)
- "Three Sonnets" (Challenge 1, January, 1936, pp. 11 – 12)
- "Weltschmerz" (Shards 4, Spring, 1936, p. 9)
- "Wisdom" (Arts Quarterly 1, July - September, 1937, p. 34)
- "Calm After Storm" (Shards 4, Spring, 1936, p. 20)
- "All I Have Known" (The Fisk Herald 31, November, 1937, p. 14)
- "You Are a Part of Me" (The Fisk Herald 31, December, 1937, p. 15)
- "Bitter Lotus" (The Fisk Herald 31, December, 1937, p. 22)
- "The Fishes and the Poet's Hands" (The Fisk Herald 31, January, 1938, pp. 10 – 11)

== Magazine articles ==
- "How and Why I Write the Costume Novel" (Harper's 219, October, 1959, pp. 145–150)

== Journal articles ==
- "A Brief Historical Sketch of the Little Theater in the Negro College" (The Quarterly Journal of Florida A&M University 10, 1940, pp. 27 – 32)
- "Problems Confronting the Little Theater in the Negro College" (Southern University Bulletin 27, 1941, pp. 96 – 103)

== Film adaptations ==
- The Foxes of Harrow (1947)
- The Golden Hawk (1952)
- The Saracen Blade (1954),
