= The Foxes of Harrow (novel) =

1946 novel by Frank Yerby

- Author: Frank Yerby
- Language: English
- Genre: Historical fiction
- Set in: Louisiana, United States
- Publisher: The Dial Press
- Publication date: February 1946
- Publication place: United States
- Media type: Print
- Pages: 534
- OCLC: 2868614
- Followed by: The Vixens

The Foxes of Harrow is the 1946 debut novel of American author Frank Yerby. It follows the life and family of Stephen Fox, an Irish gambler who becomes the patriarch of a large slave plantation in mid-1800s Louisiana. It was a bestseller with more than one million copies sold in its first year. In 1947, it was adapted as a movie of the same name, directed by John M. Stahl and starring Rex Harrison and Maureen O'Hara.

The novel was reviewed in numerous publications, including newspapers such as the Chicago Defender, the Chicago Tribune, The Cincinnati Enquirer, the Detroit Tribune, the Los Angeles Times, The Philadelphia Inquirer, and The New York Times, as well as journals of African-American culture such as The Journal of Negro Education and The Journal of Negro History.
