= Ben Ames Williams =

American novelist (1889–1953)

- Born: March 7, 1889; Macon, Mississippi, U.S.
- Died: February 4, 1953 (aged 63); Brookline, Massachusetts, U.S.
- Occupation: Writer
- Spouse: Florence Trafton Talpey (1912–1953)
- Children: Penelope Ann; Roger Chilton (Dartmouth, Class of `36); Ben Ames, Jr. (Dartmouth, Class of `38)
- Writing career
- Years active: 1919–1953

Ben Ames Williams (March 7, 1889 – February 4, 1953) was an American novelist and writer of short stories; he wrote hundreds of short stories and over 30 novels. Among his novels are Come Spring (1940), Leave Her to Heaven (1944) House Divided (1947), and The Unconquered (1953). He was published in many magazines, but the majority of his stories appeared in The Saturday Evening Post.

== Early life ==
Williams was born on March 7, 1889, in Macon, Mississippi, to Daniel Webster Williams and Sarah Marshall Ames. He was the grand-nephew of Confederate General James Longstreet.

Just after his birth, he and his parents moved to Jackson, Ohio. As his father was owner and editor of the Jackson Standard Journal, he grew up around writing, printing, and editing. In high school he worked for the Journal, doing grunt work in the beginning and eventually writing and editing. He attended Dartmouth College and upon graduation in 1910 was offered a job teaching English at a boys' school in Connecticut. He telegraphed his father seeking career advice, but his handwriting was terrible and the telegraph company clerk mistook "teaching" for "traveling", and the father, not wanting his son to become a traveling businessman, advised him not to take the job. Richard Cary says it later saved Williams from "a purgatory of grading endless, immature English 'themes'" and propelled him "toward a career as one of the most popular storytellers of his time".

After graduation, he took a job reporting for the Boston American. Williams worked hard reporting for the local newspaper, but only did this for income; his heart lay with magazine fiction. Each night he worked on his fiction writing with the aspiration that one day, his stories would support himself, his wife, Florence Talpey, and their children, Roger, Ben, and Penelope.

== Career ==
Williams first publications were The Wings of 'Lias in Smith's Magazine in July 1915, and on August 23, 1915 in The Popular Magazine with his short story, Deep Stuff. After this, his popularity slowly grew. On April 14, 1917, the Saturday Evening Post picked up one of Williams' stories, titled The Mate of the Susie Oakes. Richard Cary has highlighted the privilege of being printed in the pages of this mammoth magazine: "The Saturday Evening Post represented an Olympus of a sort to him and his contemporaries. To be gathered into its pantheon of authors, to be accepted three or five or eight (and eventually twenty-one) times in a year constituted "a seal of approval and a personal vindication", and it certainly helped his career. One of his stories in 1926 included a notorious mathematical puzzle known as the monkey and the coconuts, which provoked an outpouring of 2,000 letters to the Post asking for a solution to the problem. He published 135 short stories, 35 serials, and seven articles for the Post during a period of 24 years. After the Post took him, other magazines began eagerly seeking Williams to submit his fiction to their magazines.

Although there generally is not a common theme running through Williams' work, the pieces he contributed to the Saturday Evening Post tended to be focused on the business environment. Such stories of his as "His Public" complemented the business slant of the Post. Williams became "identified in later years with rural Maine" because so many of his stories were set there. He owned a summer home there, and grew fond of the land because he spent so much of his free time in Maine with friend A.L. McCorrison. Williams is perhaps most famous for creating the fictional town of Fraternity, located in rural Maine. 125 of his short stories were set in Fraternity, and they were most popular in the Post, though George Horace Lorimer was always upset that there was too much character and not enough plot in these stories

== Film adaptations ==
A number of his novels were turned into films, the more popular of these being Leave Her to Heaven (1945), The Strange Woman (1946), and All the Brothers Were Valiant; the latter was made twice, first in 1923 and again in 1953. His writing traversed a wide range of genres and evinced considerable expertise in a number of divergent fields. Other films based on the writing of Williams are After His Own Heart (1919), Jubilo, Jr (1927), Too Busy to Work (1932), Small Town Girl (1936), Adventure's End (1937) and Johnny Trouble (1957).

== Later years ==
The mid-1920s were the peak of Williams' short-story-writing career. In 1926, he published an impressive 21 stories in the Saturday Evening Post in addition to the stories he published in other magazines that same year. There were two main factors contributing to his slow fade from the spotlight: the Great Depression and the trend toward shorter fiction, a tough mold for the often-verbose Williams. This transition from magazine culture enabled him to focus on novel-writing.

Williams also edited and annotated the diary of Mary Boykin Chesnut (1823–1886), a Confederate wife; although others had published shorter editions, his version, titled A Diary from Dixie, was the most comprehensive edition for several decades. Recent commentators have noted that "his lack of scholarly acumen was alternately hailed by reviewers and lamented by academic critics, but Williams's work on the edition signaled his unwavering immersion in Civil War history." Steven Stowe of Indiana University explained that "Ben Ames Williams, a writer of popular fiction, brought out an edition of Chesnut’s diary in 1949, now known as one of the most extravagant escapades of editorial overreaching."

Ben Ames Williams died on February 4, 1953, in Brookline, Massachusetts after suffering a heart attack while participating in a curling contest at the Brookline Country Club. He was survived by his wife, three children, and his mother. His wife survived to 1970, and self-published a biography of her husband.

== Selected list of novels published ==
- All the Brothers Were Valiant (1919)
- The Sea Bride (1920)
- The Great Accident (1920)
- Evered (1921)
- Black Pawl (1922)
- Money Musk (1922) (Republished as Lady in Peril)
- Sangsue (1923)
- Audacity (1924)
- The Whaler (1924)
- The Rational Hand (1925)
- The Silver Forest (1926)
- Immortal Longings (1927)
- Splendor (1928)
- The Dreadful Night (1928)
- Death on Scurvy Street (1929)
- Touchstone (1930)
- Great Oaks (1931)
- An End to Mirth (1931)
- Pirate's Purchase (1931)
- Honeyflow (1932)
- Pascal's Mill (1933)
- Mischief (1933)
- Small Town Girl (1935)
- Crucible (1937)
- Thread of Scarlet (1939)
- The Happy End (1939)
- Come Spring (1940)
- The Strange Woman (1941)
- Deep Waters (1942)
- Time Of Peace (1942)
- Amateurs At War Edited (1943)
- Leave Her to Heaven (1944)
- It's a Free Country (1945)
- House Divided (1947)
- Owen Glen (1950)
- The Unconquered (1953)

The Strange Woman and Leave Her to Heaven were published as Armed Services Editions for distribution to servicemen and women serving overseas during World War II.
