= List of fiction set in Pittsburgh =

This is a list of fiction set in Pittsburgh, Pennsylvania, United States.

== Books ==
- Afterimage (Richard Christie Mystery #3) by Kathleen George
- All in Good Time by Carolyn Astfalk
- An American Childhood by Annie Dillard
- American Rust by Philipp Meyer
- Another Kind of Monday by William Coles
- Football Dreams by David Guy
- Second Brother by David Guy
- The Autobiography of My Body by David Guy
- Baby Teeth by Zoje Stage
- The Bend of the World by Jacob Bacharach
- Blood on the Forge by William Attaway
- The Book of Jonas by Stephen Dau
- The Bridge to Nowhere by Megan McDonald
- Burning Valley by Phillip Bonosky
- Captains and Kings by Taylor Caldwell
- Carnegie's Maid by Marie Benedict
- Christine by Stephen King
- Dear Zoe by Philip Beard
- Disquiet Heart by Randall Silvis
- Duffy's Rocks by Edward Fenton
- East Pittsburgh Downlow by Dave Newman
- The Einstein Pursuit (Payne & Jones #8) by Chris Kuzneski
- Elfhome (series) by Wen Spencer
- Emily, Alone by Stewart O'Nan
- Everyday People by Stewart O'Nan
- Fallen (Richard Christie Mystery #2) by Kathleen George
- Fleabrain Loves Franny by Joanne Rocklin
- From a Buick 8 by Stephen King
- The Great American Whatever by Tim Federle
- The Great Smith House Hustle by Jane Louise Curry
- Greenhorn on the Frontier by Ann Finlayson
- Ghosts of the Golden Triangle by Mord McGhee
- The Homewood Books by John Edgar Wideman
- Imaginary Friend by Stephen Chbosky
- Imposter (The Protectors #1) by Karen Fenech
- Iron City by Lloyd L. Brown
- Ironblood by Mord McGhee
- The King's Orchard by Agnes Sligh Turnbull
- The Last Chicken in America by Ellen Litman
- The Leap Year Boy by Marc Simon (2013)
- Lethal Legacy by Gerald Myers
- A Little Girl in Old Pittsburg by Amanda Minnie Douglas
- Looking For The General by Warren Miller
- Macaroni Boy by Katherine Ayres
- The Man Who Liked Slow Tomatoes by K.C. Constantine
- Me and Earl and the Dying Girl by Jesse Andrews
- The Memory Keeper's Daughter by Kim Edwards
- A Model World and Other Stories by Michael Chabon
- Monongahela Dusk by John Hoerr
- The Mysteries of Pittsburgh by Michael Chabon
- Only Ever You by Rebecca Drake
- Ophie's Ghosts by Justina Ireland
- Ornamental Graces by Carolyn Astfalk
- Our Lady of Immaculate Deception (Roxy Abruzzo Mystery #1) by Nancy Martin
- Out of This Furnace by Thomas Bell
- The Perks of Being a Wallflower by Stephen Chbosky
- The Plantation (Payne & Jones #1) by Chris Kuzneski
- Pickles to Pittsburgh by Judi Barrett
- Pride and Prejudice and Pittsburgh by Rachael Lippincott
- Remember the End by Agnes Sligh Turnbull (1938)
- Riot by William Trautmann
- Seducing Mr. Darcy by Gwyn Cready (2008)
- Sent for You Yesterday by John Edgar Wideman
- Settling Accounts: Drive to the East by Harry Turtledove
- She Gets the Girl by Rachael Lippincott and Alyson Derrick
- Snake Skin (Lucy Guardino FBI Thriller #1) by C.J. Lyons
- Stick Man by Richard Rossi
- Sword of God (Payne & Jones #3) by Chris Kuzneski
- Taken (Richard Christie Mystery #1 by Kathleen George
- The Tempering by Gloria Skurzynski
- Tomorrow and Tomorrow by Tom Sweterlitsch
- Three Golden Rivers by Olive Price
- The Two Georges by Harry Turtledove and Richard Dreyfuss
- Under the Same Blue Sky by Pamela Schoenewaldt
- U.S.A. by John dos Passos
- Ukiah Oregon (series) by Wen Spencer
- The Valley of Decision by Marcia Davenport
- Watch Your Mouth by Daniel Handler
- Ways to Disappear by Idra Novey
- Wonder Boys by Michael Chabon

== Comic books ==
- Firestorm the Nuclear Man
- The Pitt
- Star Brand

== Plays ==
- The Pittsburgh Cycle - In 2005, August Wilson completed a ten-play cycle, nine of which are set in Pittsburgh, chronicling the African-American experience in the 20th century. These are:
- 1900s - Gem of the Ocean (2003)
- 1910s - Joe Turner's Come and Gone (1984)
- 1920s - Ma Rainey's Black Bottom (1982) - set in Chicago
- 1930s - The Piano Lesson (1986) - Pulitzer Prize
- 1940s - Seven Guitars (1995)
- 1950s - Fences (1985) - Pulitzer Prize
- 1960s - Two Trains Running (1990)
- 1970s - Jitney (1982)
- 1980s - King Hedley II (2001)
- 1990s - Radio Golf (2005)

== Music ==
- "America", written by Paul Simon and performed by Simon & Garfunkel, includes the line "Kathy", I said, / As we boarded a Greyhound in Pittsburgh, / Michigan seems like a dream to me now."
- "Duquesne Whistle," which appears on the Bob Dylan album Tempest, was co-written by Dylan and Robert Hunter. The song describes a train ride through Pittsburgh. NPR's Ann Powers speculates that this may be the same train described in Dylan's "Lo and Behold".
- "A Good Man Is Hard to Find" by Bruce Springsteen describes "It's cloudy out in Pittsburgh / It's raining in Saigon / Snow's falling across the Michigan line."
- "I'm Not Dead (I'm in Pittsburgh)", which appears on the Frank Black album Fast Man Raider Man, was co-written by Black and Pittsburgher Reid Paley. It draws upon Pittsburgh's historical connection with the zombie genre.

"I finally found a place to call my own / a place where all good sinners can get stoned / I'll keep my holy vision, you keep your stupid pride / You said I couldn't make it on my own / But I'm not dead (I'm in Pittsburgh) / And now I can't get out of town / But I'm not dead (I'm in Pittsburgh) / They've got me all strung, come cut me down."

- "Life During Wartime," which appears on Talking Heads' Fear of Music and Stop Making Sense, asks the listener in a post-apocalyptic landscape, "Heard about Houston? Heard about Detroit? Heard about Pittsburgh, PA?" Long-time Talking Heads drummer Chris Frantz grew up in Pittsburgh.
- "Lo and Behold," which appears on The Basement Tapes by Bob Dylan and the Band, tells the story of the narrator recounting a train ride with "I come into Pittsburgh / At six-thirty flat / I found myself a vacant seat / An' I put down my hat."
- "Sweet Little Sixteen", by Chuck Berry, rhymes "Pittsburgh, P.A." with "Frisco Bay."
- "Six Days on the Road", written by Earl Green and Carl Montgomery, describes a trucker who says "Well, I pulled out of Pittsburgh", in describing life on the road.
- Pittsburgher Wiz Khalifa often mentions the city in his music.
- Pittsburgher Mac Miller often mentions his hometown in his music

== Video games ==
- Fallout 3
- Fallout 76
- The Last of Us
