= New Alexandria =

New Alexandria may refer to:

- New Alexandria, Ohio, USA
- New Alexandria, Pennsylvania, USA
- New Alexandria, Virginia, USA
- New Alexandria, Egypt
