= Afterimage (disambiguation) =

An afterimage is an optical illusion that occurs after looking away from a direct gaze at an image.

Afterimage or After image may also refer to:

== Film and television ==
- Afterimage (film), a 2016 Polish film
- "Afterimage" (Star Trek: Deep Space Nine), a television episode

== Music ==
- AfterImage, a Filipino pop/rock band
- The Afterimage, a Canadian metal band
- "Afterimage", a song by Rush, from their 1984 album Grace Under Pressure
- "Afterimage", a song by Justice, from their 2024 album Hyperdrama

== Print ==
- Afterimage (novel), a 2007 crime novel by Kathleen George
- After Image, a 2006 novel by Pierce Askegren based on the television series Buffy the Vampire Slayer
- Afterimages (poetry collection), a 2002 poetry collection by Robert Gray
- Afterimage, a 2000 novel by Helen Humphreys
- Afterimage, a 1992 novel by Kristine Kathryn Rusch and Kevin J. Anderson
- Afterimage (magazine), an American art magazine
