= The Nightingale (Turnbull novel) =

1960 novel by Agnes Sligh Turnbull

- First edition
- Author: Agnes Sligh Turnbull
- Language: English
- Genre: Novel
- Publisher: Houghton Mifflin
- Publication date: 1960
- Publication place: United States
- Media type: Print (hardback)
- Pages: 403
- OCLC: 1390870
- Preceded by: The Golden Journey
- Followed by: The King's Orchard

The Nightingale is a novel by the American writer Agnes Sligh Turnbull (1888–1982) set in a fictional rural Western Pennsylvania village (but much like the author's birthplace of New Alexandria, Pennsylvania, about thirty miles east of Pittsburgh) at the turn of the 20th century.

Violet Carpenter is already considered a spinster at age twenty-five when financial necessity forces her to take in lodgers. Her avocation, however, is to write poetry. To her astonishment, both paths lead to romantic crossroads.
