= Here We Stand =

Here We Stand may refer to:

- Here We Stand (Cock Sparrer album), 2007
- Here We Stand (The Fratellis album), 2008
- Here We Stand (Game of Thrones, House Mormont)

== See also ==
- Here I Stand (disambiguation)
