= Second Brother =

1985 novel by David Guy

- First edition
- Author: David Guy
- Language: English
- Genre: Novel
- Publisher: New American Library
- Publication date: 1985
- Publication place: United States
- Media type: Print (hardback)
- Pages: 264 pp
- ISBN: 0-453-00497-0
- OCLC: 11866742
- Dewey Decimal: 813/.54 19
- LC Class: PS3557.U89 S4 1985

Second Brother is a novel by the American writer David Guy set in 1960s Pittsburgh, Pennsylvania. It was his third novel, following Football Dreams and The Man Who Loved Dirty Books.

It tells the coming-of-age story of Henry Wilder who must measure himself in the shadow of his older brother, a star athlete and scholar.
