= Here I Stand =

Here I Stand may refer to:

- "Hier stehe ich" ("Here I stand"), a statement attributed to Martin Luther at the Diet of Worms (1521)
  - Here I Stand: A Life of Martin Luther, a 1950 book by Roland Bainton
- Here I Stand (book), a 1958 manifesto-autobiography by Paul Robeson
  - Paul Robeson: Here I Stand, a 1999 DVD about Paul Robeson
  - (Here I Stand) In the Spirit of Paul Robeson, a public artwork in Washington, D.C.
- Here I Stand (boardgame), a 2006 card-based wargame published by GMT Games

== Music ==
- Here I Stand (Oysterband album), 1999
- Here I Stand (Usher album), 2008
  - "Here I Stand" (Usher song), 2008
- "Here I Stand", a 1958 doo wop song by Wade Flemons
- "Here I Stand", a 1991 song by Milltown Brothers
- "Here I Stand", a 2007 song from From Them, Through Us, to You by Madina Lake
- "Here I Stand" (Vasil Garvanliev song), representing North Macedonia at Eurovision 2021
