= The Gown of Glory =

1952 novel by Agnes Sligh Turnbull

- First edition
- Author: Agnes Sligh Turnbull
- Language: English
- Publisher: Houghton Mifflin
- Publication date: March 13, 1952
- Publication place: United States
- Media type: Print (hardback)
- Pages: 403
- OCLC: 180710
- Preceded by: The Bishop's Mantle
- Followed by: The Golden Journey

The Gown of Glory is a 1952 novel by the American writer Agnes Sligh Turnbull (1888–1982). It is set in a fictional rural village of Ladykirk, which is much like the author's birthplace of New Alexandria, Pennsylvania, about thirty miles east of Pittsburgh.

== Plot ==
The story begins in 1881 when the Reverend David Lyall brings his new wife from the city to his rural manse expecting to stay only a year. Twenty-five years and three grown children later, David is still the spiritual leader of the Calvinist congregation. The plot explores the small joys and quiet griefs of a minister's life as well as what happens when a wealthy young man falls in love with the minister's daughter.
