= The Magic Fern =

1961 novel by Phillip Bonosky

- Front cover
- Author: Phillip Bonosky
- Language: English
- Genre: Proletarian literature
- Publisher: International Publishers
- Publication date: 1961
- Publication place: United States
- Media type: Print (hardback)
- Pages: 625
- OCLC: 4021544
- Preceded by: Burning Valley

The Magic Fern is a 1961 novel by the American writer Phillip Bonosky, set in the steel valley of Pittsburgh, Pennsylvania during the 1950s.

== Plot ==
A militant worker named Leo returns to his Pennsylvania hometown, where after the Korean War the steel mill is undergoing automation and workers are losing jobs. American Steel now has an international dimension. In its quest for profits iron ore is now imported from Venezuela and the Turpin Company's steel is exported around the world.

To prevent mass layoffs, the union organizes against the Turpin Company and a communist club takes a leading role in the struggle. Subplots include a struggle to free two black youths who are the victims of a racist frame-up, and the fight against the efforts of Turpin to shift the tax burden onto the poor and workers.
