= The Bishop's Mantle =

1948 novel by Agnes Sligh Turnbull

- First edition
- Author: Agnes Sligh Turnbull
- Language: English
- Publisher: The Macmillan Company
- Publication date: December 1948
- Publication place: United States
- Media type: Print (hardcover)
- Pages: 320 pp (Hardcover edition)
- Preceded by: The Day Must Dawn
- Followed by: The Gown of Glory

The Bishop's Mantle is a novel by Agnes Sligh Turnbull first published in 1947 by Macmillian. It is about the grandson of an American Episcopal bishop in New York City in the early years of World War II. The book was written during the Second World War but not published until shortly afterwards.

== Plot introduction ==
In around 1939, Hilary Laurens, a young Episcopal priest, has recently returned to his hometown, somewhere in the American heartland, upon receiving sudden word that his grandfather, the Bishop of that diocese and the only father he's known, has suddenly taken ill and is dying, and Hilary arrives just in time to talk briefly with his grandfather just before the Bishop's death, to tell him that he has just been appointed vicar of St. Matthews, a large church in a "great eastern city", and thus can perpetuate the Bishop's calling.

In course of the book, Hilary needs to cope with the multiple challenges of becoming a vicar of a major church just at the moment his grandfather dies, inheriting the Bishop's Mantle, dealing with the twin callings of a priest to keep his church financially viable, up to date, and yet in keeping of his duty to serve the poor, falling in love with Lex, the daughter of a wealthy church patron, and providing pastoral service to women in his flock, not all of whom want a priest so much as male company, and then finally deal with the odious consequences of the events of December 1941.

Hilary struggles to be a worthy replacement to his predecessor, and copes persistent attempts by various people to involve him in scandal. While Hilary deals with his pastoral issues at home, events on the world stage are escalating. His brother Dick, even though the American involvement in the war has not started, volunteers for ambulance service in Europe. Later in the novel Dick dies in the war zone, while Hilary is reconciling with the now-pregnant Lex after a period of conflict, and the attack on Pearl Harbor takes place, causing the gradual departure of young men from Hilary's parish into the Army.

== Characters in The Bishop's Mantle ==
- Hilary Laurens, Episcopal priest and protagonist of the novel
- Dick Laurens, Hilary's brother, who pursues a different life direction from his brother
- Lexa (Lex) McColly, a woman that Hilary met while visiting his brother in Maine
- Alex McColly, Lex's wealthy father, a self-made millionaire
- Eunice McColly, née Breckenridge, from old money stock, whose parents disowned her when she married Alex
- Stephen Cole, vestry man at St Matthews, Hilary's new church, whose son has committed suicide
- Miles Anderson, Stephen Cole's brother-in-law
- Dr Partridge, Hilary's predecessor as vicar of St Matthews

== Release details ==
1947, USA, MacMillan Company, Pub date 1947, hardcover (First edition)
