= An Occasional Hell =

1993 crime novel by Randall Silvis

- First edition
- Author: Randall Silvis
- Language: English
- Genre: Detective novel
- Publisher: Permanent Press
- Publication date: 1993
- Publication place: United States
- Media type: Print (hardback)
- Pages: 256 pp
- ISBN: 1-877946-24-9
- OCLC: 26674219
- Dewey Decimal: 813/.54 20
- LC Class: PS3569.I47235 O28 1993

An Occasional Hell is a 1993 detective novel by the American writer Randall Silvis, first published by Permanent Press.

Set in 1990s in the lower Monongahela River Valley below Pittsburgh, it tells the story of Ernest DeWalt, a former Chicago private investigator and successful novelist who is now a college professor. DeWalt's new life is interrupted when a philandering colleague, Alex Catanzaro, is killed in a farmland trysting place and his widow asks the former PI for help.

It was made into a film starring Tom Berenger in 1996.
