= A Little Girl in Old Pittsburg =

Book by Amanda Minnie Douglas

- First edition
- Author: Amanda Minnie Douglas
- Language: English
- Genre: Novel
- Publisher: Dodd, Mead and Company
- Publication date: 1909
- Publication place: United States
- Media type: Print (hardback)
- Pages: 335 pp
- OCLC: 22621447
- Preceded by: A Little Girl in Old Salem

A Little Girl in Old Pittsburg is a novel for children set in late 18th century Pittsburgh, Pennsylvania written by the American writer Amanda Minnie Douglas (1831–1916).

It opens in 1781 with the news of Lord Cornwallis’ surrender to George Washington as it reaches the Carrick, Bradin, and Duvernay families, pioneers who live near Fort Pitt. The protagonist, Daffodil, is the "little girl" of the title, and the plot primarily is used to illustrate the domestic life of early Pittsburghers. It ends with Daffodil's marriage and her taking leave of the city. The novel is part of a series (e.g., A Little Girl in Old Boston, A Little Girl in Old Philadelphia) that was among the first fiction series for American girls.

== See also ==
- List of fiction set in Pittsburgh
