= Dead Man Falling =

1996 crime novel by Randall Silvis

- First edition
- Author: Randall Silvis
- Language: English
- Genre: Novel
- Publisher: Carroll & Graf
- Publication date: 1996
- Publication place: United States
- Media type: Print (Hardback)
- Pages: 214 pp
- ISBN: 0-7867-0313-X
- OCLC: 34752787
- Dewey Decimal: 813/.54 20
- LC Class: PS3569.I47235 D4 1996

Dead Man Falling is a crime novel by the American writer Randall Silvis.

Set in 1990s in the Allegheny National Forest of Western Pennsylvania on the upper Allegheny River Valley, including the Kinzua Dam north Pittsburgh, it tells the story of wildlife filmmaker Mac Parris, who has spent most of his adult life hiding from the FBI and his own past, as he helps a young woman find her brother's killer.
