= Greenhorn on the Frontier =

1974 historical novel by Ann Finlayson

- First edition
- Author: Ann Finlayson
- Language: English
- Genre: Novel
- Publisher: Frederick Warne & Co
- Publication date: 1974
- Publication place: United States
- Media type: Print (hardback)
- Pages: 209 pp
- ISBN: 0-7232-6104-0
- OCLC: 1009199

Greenhorn on the Frontier is an historical, young-adult novel by the American writer Ann Finlayson.

It is set in 1770s Pittsburgh, Pennsylvania, just before the American Revolutionary War, and tells the story of nineteen-year-old Harry Warrilow and his twenty-three-year-old sister, Sukey, who move their few possessions by hand cart to start their own farm on the Western Pennsylvania frontier. The plot features characters like Simon Girty, Arthur St. Clair, and Indian tribes such as the Shawnee and Lenape.
