= The Rolling Years =

1936 novel by Agnes Sligh Turnbull

- First edition
- Author: Agnes Sligh Turnbull
- Language: English
- Publisher: The Macmillan Company
- Publication date: 1936
- Publication place: United States
- Media type: Print (hardback)
- Pages: 436
- OCLC: 17316163
- Followed by: Remember the End

The Rolling Years is the first novel by the American writer Agnes Sligh Turnbull (1888–1982) set in her childhood Laurel Highlands and Allegheny Mountains of Western Pennsylvania.

It is the first of Turnbull's three "Westmoreland novels" set in Westmoreland County, Pennsylvania. The three novels feature happy endings while critiquing excesses of patriarchy, strict Calvinism, and industrialization from a woman's perspective. The Rolling Years is considered an understudied example of Northern Appalachian fiction.

The Rolling Years is a family chronicle (1852–1910) of three generations of Scotch-Irish Presbyterians in rural Western Pennsylvania and their struggles to maintain their strict faith. The first generation is Daniel and Sarah McDowell, a farm couple. Sarah bears 12 children (of whom five survive) to her dour Calvinistic husband; her bitterness about her repeated, difficult confinements is effectively shown. The second generation is about their children, David and Jeannie. David moves to Pittsburgh where he becomes a judge. Jeannie marries a minister who has been serving as the local schoolteacher to earn money to complete his education. Jeannie's daughter, Constance, represents the third generation. She becomes a schoolteacher and struggles to find her place in a changing world. The novel dramatizes the gradual weakening of the strict Calvinism of the Scottish immigrants in an increasingly secular society.
