= Samuel Sillen =

American literary critic and editor of Marxist journals (1910–1973)

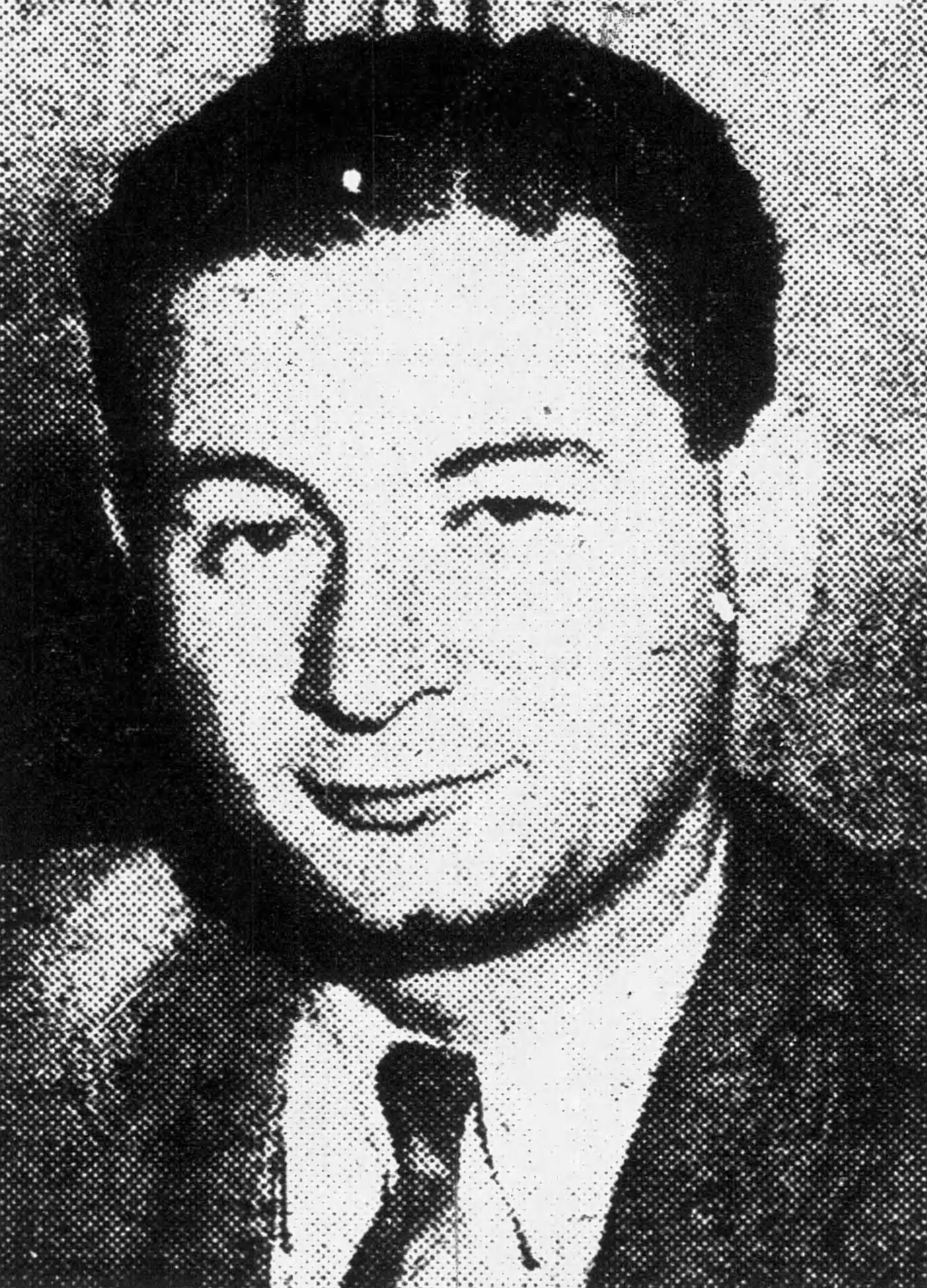
- Sillen c. 1948
- Born: June 17, 1910; New York City, U.S.
- Died: February 5, 1973 (aged 62); New York City, U.S.
- Citizenship: American
- Education: New York University; University of Wisconsin-Madison
- Occupations: Editor, teacher, author
- Employer(s): New York University; New Masses; Masses & Mainstream
- Spouse: Janet Feder (m. 1935)
- Children: Thomas; Robert
- Writing career
- Pen name: Walter Ralston
- Notable works: Walt Whitman: Poet of American Democracy (1944); Women against Slavery (1955)

Samuel Sillen (June 17, 1910 – February 5, 1973) was an American literary critic, author, professor, and magazine editor. In 1948, he co-founded and became the first editor of the Marxist monthly publication, Masses & Mainstream.

== Biography ==
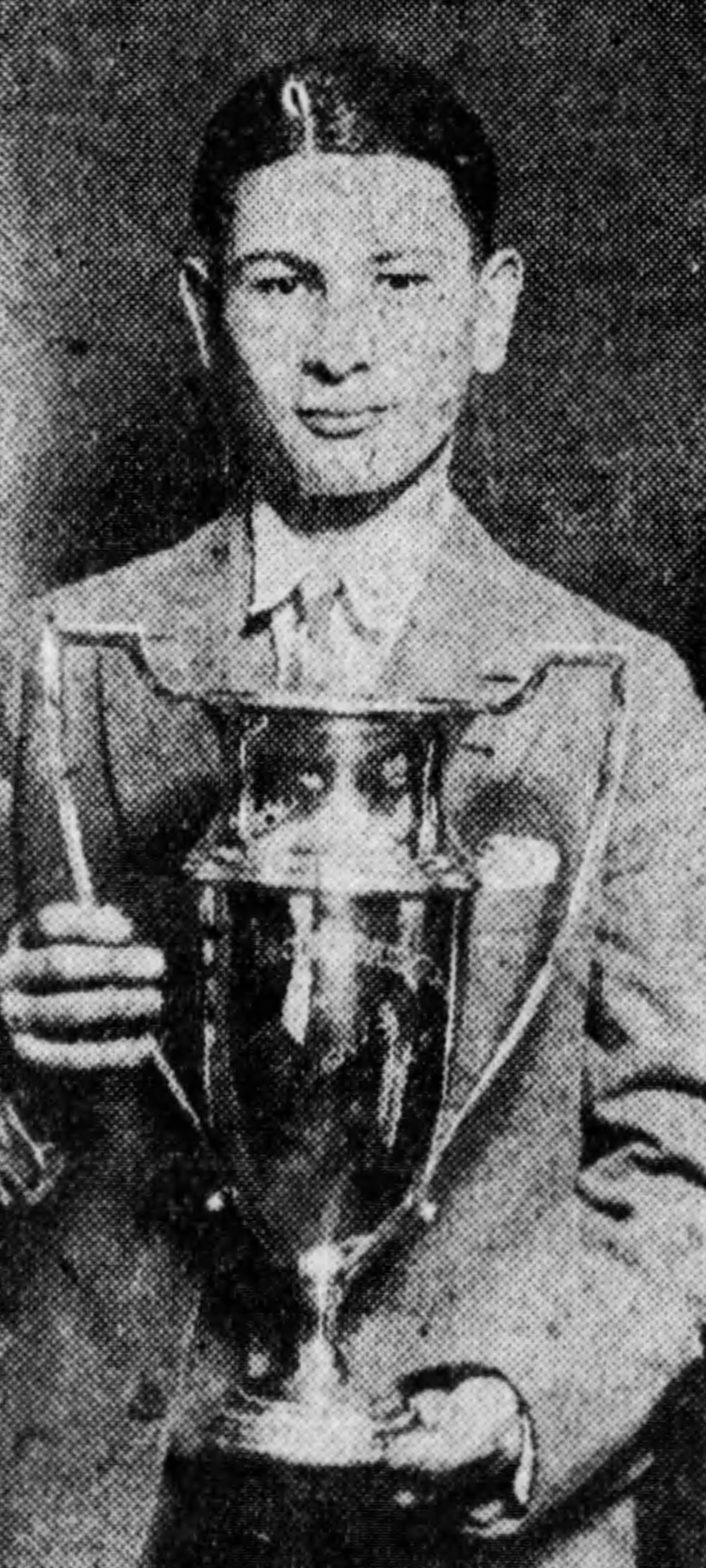
Sillen, aged 14, after winning a current events quiz competition hosted by The Brooklyn Daily Eagle, April 16, 1925

Sillen was born in Brooklyn, where he attended Boys High School. He graduated from NYU in 1930. In 1935, he received a doctorate in English from the University of Wisconsin-Madison. He wrote his dissertation on the 19th century English biographer, Sir Leslie Stephen. After graduating, Sillen was hired as an English professor at NYU. He remained in the job until 1944, when he left in anticipation of what he expected to be an anti-Communist purge at the university.

While teaching at NYU, Sillen started contributing articles to Communist Party (CPUSA) publications, including the Daily Worker and New Masses. For the latter publication, he sometimes used the pseudonym "Walter Ralston". In 1937, Sillen became literary editor at New Masses, eventually replacing Granville Hicks as chief literary critic. In 1944, Sillen edited and provided a lengthy introduction to Walt Whitman: Poet of American Democracy. The following year, he edited a similar anthology about 19th century American poet William Cullen Bryant.

In 1947, the CPUSA launched a quarterly literary journal called Mainstream, with Sillen serving as its editor. The journal only lasted one year. In 1948, facing dwindling financial resources, Mainstream and New Masses were merged into Masses & Mainstream. Sillen was a co-founder of the new monthly publication and its first editor. During his tenure, he wrote and/or edited numerous pamphlets that were published under the Masses & Mainstream imprint. In some instances, notable issues of the magazine were re-edited by Sillen and separately published. In 1955, he authored Women against Slavery, a book about American women abolitionists.

In April 1956, in the wake of Khruschev's Secret Speech at the 20th Congress of the Communist Party, Sillen resigned his editorship at Masses & Mainstream. He also dropped out of the CPUSA that same year. He then got a job as editor at Citadel Press. He became interested in the medical field and from 1963 to 1967 served as senior editor of Medical World News. In 1972, he co-authored with Alexander Thomas a book titled Racism and Psychiatry.

On February 5, 1973, Samuel Sillen died of cancer at University Hospital in Brooklyn. He was 62.

== Bibliography ==
- Leslie Stephen: A Study in Critical Theory. University of Wisconsin-Madson. 1935. OCLC 1512672893. Ph.D. dissertation.
- Walt Whitman: Poet of American Democracy. International Publishers. 1944. LCCN 45001286. OCLC 2211645. Edited and with an introduction by Sillen.
- William Cullen Bryant: Selections from His Poetry and Prose. International Publishers. 1945. LCCN 46002417. OCLC 1397217. Edited and with an introduction by Sillen.
- Pound relies on 'soft' Americans to escape traitor's fate. Daily Worker. 1945. OCLC 38545299.
- "The Worst Crimes in History". Daily Worker. May 8, 1945.
- Masses & Mainstream, Volume 1, Number 4. Masses & Mainstream. 1948. OCLC 1153697370.
- Dooley, Twain and Imperialism. Masses & Mainstream. 1948. OCLC 56094200.
- Cold War in the Classroom. Masses & Mainstream. 1950.
- Masses & Mainstream, Volume 3, Number 9. Masses & Mainstream. 1950. OCLC 56562727.
- Negro History Week. Masses & Mainstream. 1952. OCLC 495545766. Republication of Masses & Mainstream, Volume 5, Number 2.
- Charles W. Chesnutt: A Pioneer Negro Novelist. Masses & Mainstream. 1953. OCLC 383449777.
- "Introduction". The Mike Gold Reader. New York: International Publishers. 1954. OCLC 284415.
- Women against Slavery. Masses & Mainstream. 1955. LCCN 56001026. OCLC 1048506.
- The Standard Handbook of Style. Grosset & Dunlap. 1963. LCCN 63014803. OCLC 6201357.
- Racism and Psychiatry. Brunner/Mazel. 1972. ISBN 978-0876300497. OCLC 425590373. Co-written with Alexander Thomas.
