= Hilary Masters =

American novelist

- Born: February 3, 1928; Kansas City, Missouri, U.S.
- Died: June 14, 2015 (aged 87); Pittsburgh, Pennsylvania, U.S.
- Education: Davidson College; Brown University (BA)
- Occupation: Novelist
- Spouses: Polly Jo McCulloch (m. 1955; div. 1986) Kathleen George (m. 1994)
- Children: 3
- Parent(s): Edgar Lee Masters; Ellen Frances Coyne Masters

Hilary Masters (February 3, 1928 in Kansas City, Missouri – June 14, 2015 in Pittsburgh, Pennsylvania) was an American novelist, the son of poet Edgar Lee Masters, and Ellen Frances Coyne Masters. He attended Davidson College from 1944 to 1946, then served in the U.S. Navy from 1946 to 1947 as a naval correspondent. He completed a BA at Brown University in 1952.

Masters began his writing career after graduation in New York City with Bennett & Pleasant, press agents for concert and dance artists. Next he worked independently as a theatrical press agent for Off Broadway and summer theaters from 1953 to 1956. He then moved into journalism with the Hyde Park Record, in Hyde Park, New York from 1956 to 1959. In the 1960s he was a Democratic candidate for New York's 100th Assembly District. He also worked as a freelance photographer for Image Bank and exhibits.

He taught writing at the University of North Carolina at Greensboro, Drake University, Clark University, Ohio University, and the University of Denver. From 1983 until his death 32 years later he served as Professor of English at Carnegie Mellon University in Pittsburgh, Pennsylvania.

Masters married Polly Jo McCulloch in 1955 (divorced, 1986); they had three children. In 1994 he married the writer Kathleen George. Masters resided in Pittsburgh's Mexican War Streets and died at home in Pittsburgh, Pennsylvania.

== Works ==
- The Common Pasture, novel (New York: Macmillan, 1967)
- An American Marriage, novel (New York: Macmillan, 1969)
- Palace of Strangers, novel (New York: World Publishing, 1971)
- Last Stands: Notes from Memory , biography (Boston: David Godine, 1982)
- Clemmons, novel (Boston: David Godine, 1985)
- Hammertown Tales , short stories (Winston-Salem: Wright, 1986)
- Cooper, novel (New York: St. Martin's, 1987)
- Manuscript for Murder, novel under pseudonym P. J. Coyne (New York: Dodd, Mead, 1987)
- Strickland, novel (New York: St. Martin's, 1989)
- Success: New and Selected Short Stories, short stories (New York: St. Martin's, 1992)
- Home Is the Exile, novel (Sag Harbor: Permanent Press, 1996)
- In Montaigne's Tower, essays (Columbia: University of Missouri Press, 2000)
- Shadows On a Wall: Juan O'Gorman and the Mural in Patzcuaro, nonfiction (Pittsburgh: University of Pittsburgh Press, 2005)
- Elegy for Sam Emerson, novel (Dallas: Southern Methodist University Press, 2006)
- How the Indians Buried Their Dead, short stories (Dallas: Southern Methodist University Press, 2009)
- Post: A Fable, novel (2011)

== Sources ==
- Contemporary Authors Online. The Gale Group, 2004. PEN (Permanent Entry Number): 0000065011.
- Kelsey, Sigrid. "Hilary Masters." Dictionary of Literary Biography, Volume 244: American Short-Story Writers Since World War II, Fourth Series. A Bruccoli Clark Layman Book. Edited by Patrick Meanor Joseph McNicholas. The Gale Group, 2001. pp. 239–245.
