= Masses & Mainstream =

American Marxist magazine (1948–1963)

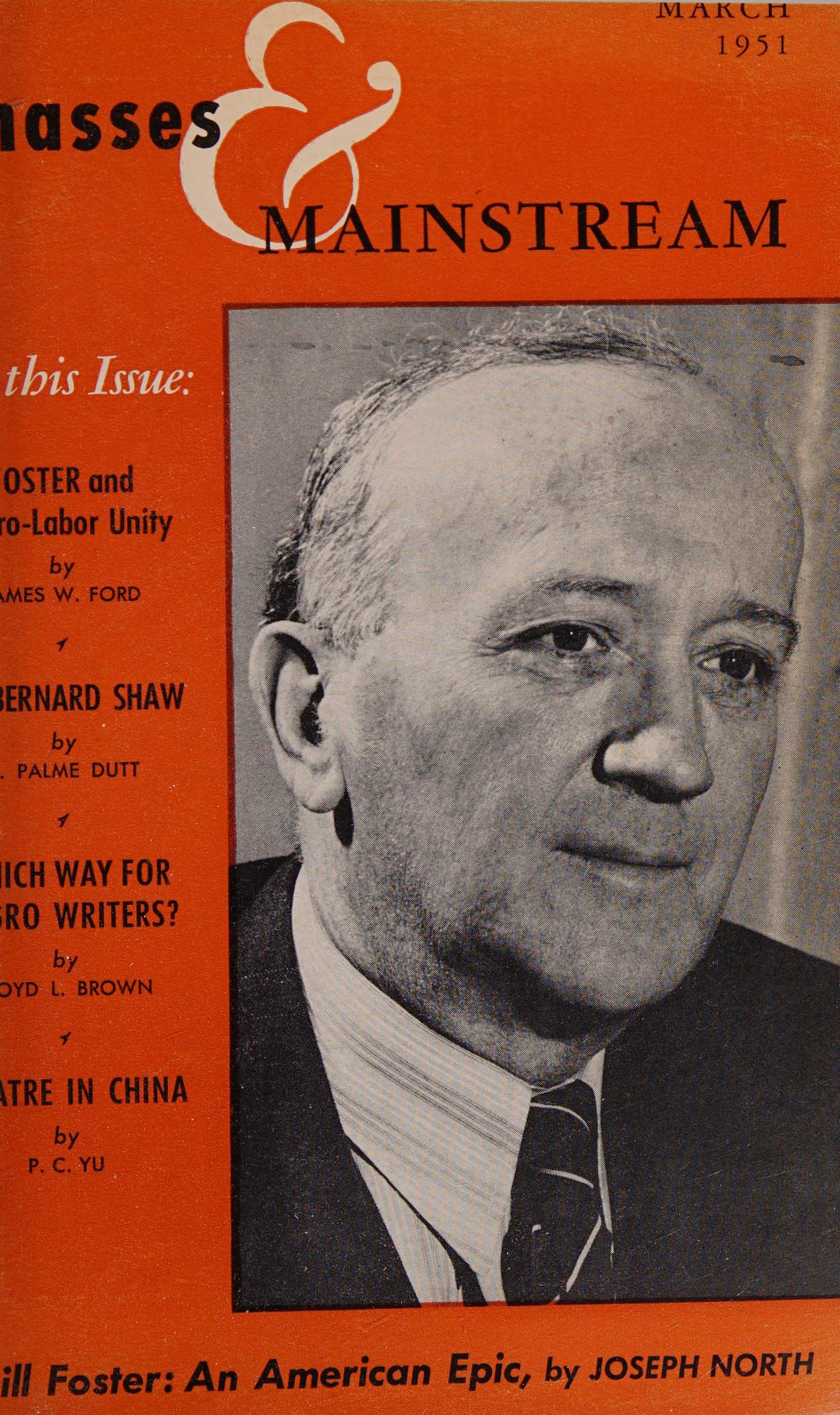
The cover of Masses & Mainstream's March 1951 issue, featuring William Z. Foster

Masses & Mainstream (1948–1963) was an American Marxist monthly publication headquartered in New York City. The magazine resulted from a merger between New Masses, which ceased publication in January 1948, and Mainstream, a Communist cultural quarterly established in 1947.

Masses & Mainstream was edited by Samuel Sillen. On the board of editors were critics, writers and scholars including Sidney Finkelstein, W.E.B. Du Bois, Mike Gold, Herbert Aptheker, Phillip Bonosky, Lloyd L. Brown, Annette Rubinstein, and John Howard Lawson.

Although many of the magazine's best-known contributors had written for New Masses before World War II, Masses & Mainstream also provided a platform for younger writers such as Howard Fast, Thomas McGrath, Eve Merriam, Jesús Colón, and Lorraine Hansberry.

In a book about the African-American cultural left of the 1950s, Mary Washington observes: "Except for black publications, no magazines or journals, even leftist journals like Partisan Review, published black writers regularly in the 1950s or 1960s" to the same extent as Masses & Mainstream. In its 1952 Negro History Week issue, the magazine listed 20 black contributors—among them Alice Childress, James W. Ford, William L. Patterson, Pettis Perry, Paul Robeson, and Charles W. White—whose writings appeared in the magazine in the prior year.

The magazine had a circulation of 17,000 in 1948, but steadily lost subscribers during the McCarthy era. Masses & Mainstream shut down in 1956. It then became an offshoot publication entitled Mainstream which lasted until 1963.

In addition to its monthly magazine, Masses & Mainstream published a small number of pamphlets and books, including:

- Howard Fast, Intellectuals in the Fight for Peace (1949) LCCN 74-191538
- V. J. Jerome, The Negro in Hollywood Films (1950) LCCN 68-126425
- Pablo Neruda, Let the Rail Splitter Awake and Other Poems (1950) LCCN 77-150747
- W. E. B. Du Bois, I Take My Stand for Peace (1951) OCLC 3347112
- Lloyd L. Brown, Iron City (1951) LCCN 51-4920
- Steve Nelson, The Volunteers (1953) LCCN 53-8179
- John Howard Lawson, Film in the Battle of Ideas (1953) LCCN 53-13277
- Virginia Gardner, The Rosenberg Story (1954) LCCN 54-11599
- Steve Nelson, The 13th Juror: The Inside Story of My Trial (1955) LCCN 55-31685
- Samuel Sillen, Women against Slavery (1955) LCCN 56-1026
- Anna Louise Strong, The Stalin Era (1956) LCCN 2023-658225
- Herbert Aptheker, The Truth about Hungary (1957) LCCN 57-2931
- Thomas McGrath, The Gates of Ivory, the Gates of Horn (1957) LCCN 58-14524
- Jesús Colón, A Puerto Rican in New York, and Other Sketches (1961) LCCN 61-19788
- W. E. B. Du Bois, Worlds of Color (1961) LCCN 61-3560
