= Home Is the Exile =

Novel by the American writer Hilary Masters

- Author: Hilary Masters
- Language: English
- Genre: Novel
- Publisher: Permanent Press
- Publication date: 1996
- Publication place: United States
- Media type: Print (hardback)
- Pages: 286
- ISBN: 1-877946-73-7
- OCLC: 32508976

Home Is the Exile is a novel by the American writer Hilary Masters set in 1990s Pittsburgh, Pennsylvania.

The novel weaves the stories of two military men of two eras: aviator Roy Armstrong is a veteran of the Republican cause in the Spanish Civil War, while Walt Hardy, a player in the Iran-Contra Affair, has returned to contemporary Pittsburgh, where he grew up.
