= Fallen (George novel) =

2004 novel by Kathleen George

- Author: Kathleen George
- Language: English
- Genre: Crime novel
- Publisher: Dell Publishing
- Publication date: 2004
- Publication place: United States
- Media type: Print (Paperback)
- Pages: 387
- ISBN: 0-440-23664-9
- OCLC: 55799202
- Preceded by: Taken
- Followed by: Afterimage

Fallen is a crime novel by the American writer Kathleen George set in 1990s Pittsburgh, Pennsylvania.

It tells the story of the murder of a Pittsburgh doctor, Dan Ross, his distraught wife, and how Commander Richard Christie tracks the killer.

== Sources ==
Contemporary Authors Online. The Gale Group, 2006. PEN (Permanent Entry Number): 0000142340.
