= Elegy for Sam Emerson =

Book by Hilary Masters

- Author: Hilary Masters
- Language: English
- Genre: Novel
- Publisher: Southern Methodist University Press
- Publication date: 2006
- Publication place: United States
- Media type: Print (hardback)
- Pages: 288
- ISBN: 0-87074-507-7
- OCLC: 63808368
- Preceded by: Shadows On a Wall: Juan O'Gorman and the Mural in Patzcuaro

Elegy for Sam Emerson is a novel by the American writer Hilary Masters set in pre-9/11 Pittsburgh, Pennsylvania.

The novel tells the story of Sam Emerson, proprietor of an upscale Mount Washington restaurant with stunning views of the three rivers below. Emerson, at midlife and nostalgic, ruminates on his strange childhood as he faces the prospect of life without his much younger lover, and at the same time, deals with disposing of his mother's ashes and traveling to France to look for his father's unmarked grave.

== Sources ==
Contemporary Authors Online. The Gale Group, 2004. PEN (Permanent Entry Number): 0000065011.
