= The Day Must Dawn =

1942 novel by Agnes Sligh Turnbull

- First edition
- Author: Agnes Sligh Turnbull
- Cover artist: John O'Hara Cosgrave II
- Language: English
- Publisher: The Macmillan Company
- Publication date: 1942
- Publication place: USA
- Media type: Print (Hardback)
- Pages: 483
- OCLC: 290523
- Preceded by: Remember the End
- Followed by: The Bishop's Mantle

The Day Must Dawn is a 1942 historical novel by the American writer Agnes Sligh Turnbull (1888–1982) set in 1777 in Hanna's Town, Pennsylvania, a frontier settlement thirty miles east of Pittsburgh.

It is the final work among Turnbull's three Westmoreland novels set in her childhood Laurel Highlands and Allegheny Mountains of Western Pennsylvania. The three Westmoreland novels feature happy endings and critiques of patriarchy, religious legalism, and industrialization from a woman's perspective. It is considered an understudied example of Northern Appalachian fiction.

The novel is an 18th-century pioneer romance about a Scotch-Irish family living in Pennsylvania. The mother, toughened by hardships, tries to have her daughter go east to a more civilized life. The novel peaks with the burning of Hanna's Town in July 1782 by British-allied American Indians led by Guyasuta. The story concludes with her acceptance that her daughter will marry a frontiersman and go west to even wilder country.
