= David Guy (author) =

American novelist (born 1948)

- Born: 1948 (age 77–78)
- Occupation: Writer
- Writing career
- Language: English
- Website: https://davidguy.org

David Guy (born 1948) is an American author and retired professor. Originally from Pittsburgh, Pennsylvania, he moved to Durham, North Carolina after graduating from Duke University. He published his first novel, Football Dreams in 1980, while also writing book reviews. Between 2001 and 2014 he taught at Duke's Sanford School of Public Policy.

== Bibliography ==
- Football Dreams, 1980
- The Man Who Loved Dirty Books, 1983
- Second Brother, 1985
- The Autobiography of My Body, 1991
- The Red Thread of Passion, 1999
- Jake Fades, 2007
- Hank Heals, 2022
