= Amanda Minnie Douglas =

American writer

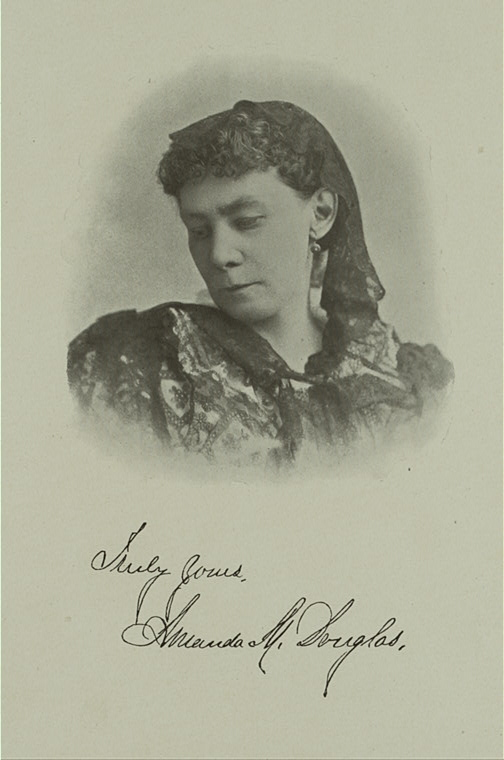
- Photo from the New York Public Library
- Born: July 14, 1831; New York City, U.S.
- Died: July 18, 1916 (aged 85); Newark, New Jersey, U.S.
- Resting place: Mt. Pleasant Cemetery, Newark
- Occupation: Author

Amanda Minnie Douglas (July 14, 1831 – July 18, 1916) was an American writer of adult and juvenile fiction. She was probably best remembered by young readers of her day for the Little Girl and Helen Grant series published over the decades flanking the turn of the twentieth century.

== Early life ==
Born in New York City, the eldest daughter of John Douglas and Elizabeth Horton was raised in the city of her birth with the exception of several years spent on a farm near Poughkeepsie, New York. She studied art design at the City Institute of New York City for a time before circumstances forced her to fall back on her greater talent as a writer to help support her family. In 1853, Douglas and her family moved from New York City to Newark, New Jersey, where she would remain a resident for the balance of her life.

== Career ==
Douglas began by submitting short stories and poems to local publications. In time her stories appeared in editions of The New York Ledger, Saturday Evening Post and the Lady's Friend Magazine. Her first novel, In Trust, was published in 1866 and sold some 20,000 copies. Learning from this first experience, Douglas made sure to retain the copyrights on all of her future works. She would go on to publish at least a novel a year until her retirement in 1913.

A sampling of her works over a near fifty-year career would include: Claudia (1867); Stephen Dane (1867); Sydnie Adriance (1868); With Fate Against Him (1870); Kathie's Stories for Young People (6 vols., 1870-'71); Lucia: Her Problem (1871); Santa Claus Land (1873); Home Nook (1873); The Old Woman who Lived in a Shoe (1874); Seven Daughters (1874); Nelly Kinnard's Kingdom (1876); From Hand to Mouth (1877); Hope Mills (1879); Lost in a Great City (1880); The Heirs of Bradley House (1882); Osborne of Arrochar (1883); Whom Kathie Married (1883); Floyd Grandon's Honor (1883); Out of the Wreck (1884); Bertha Wray's New Name (1884); A Woman's Inheritance (1885); Foes of Her Household (1886); In the King's Country (1886); The Midnight Marriage; or, A Plot to Gain a Fortune (c. 1890); Floyd Grandon's Honor (1892); In Wild Rose Time (1894); Her Place in the World (1895); Sherburne Series (6 vols., 1895); A Little Girl in Old New York (1897); A Little Girl in Old Boston (1897); A Little Girl in Old Philadelphia (1898); A Little Girl in Old Washington (1899); A Question of Silence (1901); Almost as Good as a Boy (1901); A Little Girl in Old New Orleans (1902); A Little Girl in Old Detroit. (1903); A Little Girl in Old Chicago; A Little Girl in Old San Francisco; Helen Grant's School Days; Helen Grant's Friends (1904); Helen Grant at Aldred House (1905); Helen Grant in College (1906); A Little Girl in Old Quebec (1906); Helen Grant, Senior (1907); Helen Grant, Graduate (1908); Helen Grant, Teacher (1909); and A Little Girl in Old Pittsburg (1909). Her final works, published in 1913, were A Modern Cinderella and The Red House Children at Grafton.

== Private life ==
Douglas cared for Annie, her chronically ill younger sister, for most of her life. She never married. Douglas patented a design of a portable folding mosquito net frame intended for travelers and artists, and had helped others perfect their inventions. Douglas was a friend of Louisa May Alcott and an acquaintance of Edgar Allan Poe. She was an active member of the Ray Palmer Club, a Newark woman's literary group, and the New Jersey Women's Press Club.

== Death ==
Douglas died four days past her 85th birthday at her Newark residence on Summer Avenue. Her funeral services were held at St. James Episcopal Church in Newark and her remains interred beside her sister in Mt. Pleasant Cemetery.

== Works ==
- The dates following the titles are publication and/or copyright dates.

=== The Kathie Stories ===
1. Kathie's Three Wishes, 1873, 1883, 1898
2. Kathie's Aunt Ruth, 1871, 1873, 1883
3. Kathie's Summer at Cedarwood, 1898
4. Kathie's Soldiers, 1871, 1877, 2015
5. In the Ranks (AKA Kathie in the Ranks), 1872
6. Kathie's Harvest Days, 1883, 1889, 2009

==== Follow up to The Kathie Stories ====
- Whom Kathie Married, 1883, 1911, 2016

=== Sherburne Series ===
1. Sherburne House, 1892, 2015
2. Lyndell Sherburne, 1893, 2010
3. Sherburne Cousins, 1894
4. A Sherburne Romance, 1895
5. The Mistress of Sherburne, 1896, 2016
6. The Children at Sherburne House, 1897
7. Sherburne Girls, 1898, 2016
8. The Heir of Sherburne, 1899
9. A Sherburne Inheritance, 1901, 1905
10. A Sherburne Quest, 1902, 2008
11. Honor Sherburne, September 1904
12. In the Sherburne Line, September 1907

=== A Little Girl Series ===
1. A Little Girl in Old New York, 1896, 2016
2. A Little Girl of Long Ago; Or, Hannah Ann (AKA Hannah Ann: A Sequel to A Little Girl in Old New York), 1897, 1898, 1901, 2008, 2009
3. A Little Girl in Old Boston, 1898, 2016 (starring Doris)
4. A Little Girl in Old Philadelphia, 1899 (starring Primrose)
5. A Little Girl in Old Washington, 1900
6. A Little Girl in New Orleans, 1901
7. A Little Girl in Old Detroit, 1902, 2009, 2015
8. A Little Girl in Old St. Louis, 1903
9. A Little Girl in Old Chicago, 1904, 2016 (starring Ruth Gaynor)
10. A Little Girl in Old San Francisco, 1905
11. A Little Girl in Old Quebec, 1906, 2015
12. A Little Girl in Old Baltimore, 1907
13. A Little Girl in Old Salem, 1908, 2015 (starring Cynthia Leveritt)
14. A Little Girl in Old Pittsburg, 1909 (starring Daffodil)

=== The Helen Grant Books ===
1. Helen Grant's Schooldays, 1903, 2017
2. Helen Grant's Friends, 1904
3. Helen Grant at Aldred House, 1905
4. Helen Grant in College, 1906
5. Helen Grant, Senior, 1907
6. Helen Grant, Graduate, 1908
7. Helen Grant, Teacher, 1909
8. Helen Grant's Decision, 1910
9. Helen Grant's Harvest Year, 1911

=== Little Red House Series ===
1. The Children in the Little Old Red House, 1912
2. The Red House Children at Grafton, 1913
3. The Red House Children's Vacation, 1914
4. The Red House Children's Year, 1915
5. The Red House Children Growing Up, 1916

=== The Maidenhood Series (various authors) ===
1. Seven Daughters, by Amanda Minnie Douglas, 1874, 2015
2. Our Helen, by Sophie May
3. The Asbury Twins, by Sophie May
4. That Queer Girl, by Miss Virginia F. Townsend
5. Running to Waste, by George M. Baker
6. Daisy Travers, by Adelaide F. Samuels

=== White Black and Gold Series (various authors) ===
1. Heroes of the Crusades, by Amanda Minnie Douglas, 1889, 1892
2. Adventures of a China Man, by Jules Verne
3. Fighting: The Life of Philip H. Sheridan, by Headley
4. Perseverance Island or the Robinson Crusoe of the Nineteenth Century, by Douglas Frazar
5. Our Standard-bearer: Olive Optic's Life of Gen. U.S. Grant, by Oliver Optic
6. Lives of the Presidents: From Washington to Cleveland, by unknown

=== Altemus' Golden Days Series (various authors) ===
1. An Easter Lily, by Amanda Minnie Douglas, 1906
2. Miss Appolina's Choice, by Ellen Douglas Deland
3. A Boy Lieutenant, by F.S. Bowley
4. Polly and the Other Girl, by Sophie Swett
5. Herm, and I, by Myron B. Gibson
6. Sam, by M.G. McClelland

=== Other ===
- Stephen Dane, 1867
- Sydnie Adriance: Or, Trying the World, 1867, 1869, 2018
- Claudia, 1868
- In Trust; or, Dr. Bertrand's Household. A tale, 1868, 1872, 1891
- Kept His Trust; or, The Doctor's Household, 1868
- With Fate against Him, 1870
- Lucia: Her Problem, 1872
- Home Nook: Or, The Crown of Duty, 1874, 1893, 1901
- The Old Woman Who Lived in a Shoe; Or, There's No Place Like Home, 1874, 1875, 2014, 2018
- There's No Place Like Home, 1875
- Drifted Asunder; Or, the Tide of Fate, 1876, 2013, 2015
- Nelly Kinnard's Kingdom, 1876, 1904
- From Hand to Mouth, 1878, 1905
- Our Wedding Gifts, 1878
- Hope Mills: Or, Between Friend and Sweetheart, 1879, 1880
- Lost in a Great City, 1880, 1881, 1908, 2012
- Floyd Grandon's Honor, 1883, 2015
- Out of the Wreck, 1884, 1885
- A Woman's Inheritance, 1885, 2016
- Foes of Her Household, 1886, 2016
- A Modern Adam and Eve in a Garden, 1888, 1889, 2010
- The Fortunes of the Faradays, 1888
- Osborne of Arrochar (Arrochan is a typo), 1889, 1890, 2016
- Guilty or Not Guilty: A Novel. The Leisure Hour Library. Vol. III. No. 278. February 15, 1890
- The Midnight Marriage; or, A Plot to Gain a Fortune, 1890, 1899
- The Heirs of Bradley House, 1892
- Bethia Wray's New Name, 1893
- Larry, 1893
- In the King's Country, 1894, 2016
- In Wild Rose Time, 1894, 1895, 2015
- Her Place in the World, 1897, 2015
- Almost as Good as a Boy, 1900, 1901
- A Question of Silence, 1901
- How Bessie Kept House, 1903
- A Little Missionary, by 1904
- Clover's Princess, 1904
- What Charlie Found to Do, 1906
- A Modern Cinderella, 1913, 2013
- The Girls at Mount Morris, 1914, 2015
