= Randall Silvis =

American novelist

- Born: Madison Township, Clarion County, Pennsylvania, U.S.
- Education: Clarion University; Indiana University of Pennsylvania
- Occupations: Novelist; playwright; screenwriter; educator
- Writing career
- Notable awards: Drue Heinz Literature Prize (1984)

Randall Silvis is an American novelist, writer, poet and teacher of creative writing.

== Life ==
Born in Madison Township, Clarion County, Pennsylvania, Silvis was educated at Clarion University and Indiana University of Pennsylvania. In 2008, Silvis was awarded an honorary Doctor of Letters from Indiana University of Pennsylvania for "a sustained career of distinguished literary achievement."

== Awards ==
Silvis won the Drue Heinz Literature Prize in 1984 for his first book, The Luckiest Man in the World, as selected by Joyce Carol Oates. He is the recipient of two fellowships from the National Endowment for the Arts and a Fulbright Senior Scholar Research Award, plus six fellowship awards from the Pennsylvania Council on the Arts for his fiction, drama, and screenwriting. His novels An Occasional Hell and Two Days Gone were finalists for the Hammett Prize for literary excellence in crime writing from the International Association of Crime Writers, and two of his short stories were nominated for a Pushcart Prize.

Other literary awards include:

- “On Bluebird Lane”, First Place, The 2024 Tennessee Williams Short Story Prize from the Key West Art & Historical Society
- Pabst Endowed Chair for Master Artists, Atlantic Center for the Arts
- James Thurber Writer-in-Residence, The Thurber House/The Ohio State University
- Pittsburgh New Works Festival
- Mercyhurst College Writer-in-Residence
- Ruby Lloyd Apsey Playwriting Award from the University of Alabama at Birmingham
- MacDowell Artists Colony Fellowship

== Books ==
- The Luckiest Man in the World, short stories (Pittsburgh: University of Pittsburgh Press, 1984)
- Excelsior, novel (New York: Henry Holt, 1988)
- Under the Rainbow, novel (Sag Harbor: Permanent Press, 1993)
- An Occasional Hell, novel (Sag Harbor: Permanent Press, 1993)
- Dead Man Falling, novel (New York: Carroll & Graf, 1996) 2nd edition (Two Suns Books 2025)
- Mysticus, novel (Los Angeles: Wolfhawk Books, 1999)
- On Night's Shore, novel (New York: Thomas Dunne Books, 2000)
- Disquiet Heart, novel (New York: St. Martin's Minotaur, 2002). Also published as Doubly Dead, novel (2004)
- North of Unknown: Mina Hubbard's Extraordinary Expedition into the Labrador Wilderness, nonfiction (New York: The Lyons Press, 2005). Originally published as Heart So Hungry (Knopf Canada, 2004)
- In a Town Called Mundomuerto, novel (Omnidawn Books, 2007)
- Hangtime, A Confession, novel (Kitsune Books, 2009)
- The Boy Who Shoots Crows, novel (Penguin/Berkley, 2011)
- Flying Fish, novel (PS Publishing UK, 2012)
- Blood & Ink, e-book novel (Kindle Scout, 2015) paperback edition (Two Suns Books, 2025)
- Two Days Gone, novel (Sourcebooks, 2017)
- Only the Rain, novel (Thomas & Mercer, 2017)
- Walking the Bones, novel (Sourcebooks, 2018)
- First the Thunder, novel (Thomas & Mercer, 2018)
- A Long Way Down, novel (Sourcebooks, 2019)
- Incident on Ten-Right Road, short story collection (Riverdale Avenue Books, 2019)
- No Woods So Dark as These, novel (Sourcebooks, 2020)
- My Secret Life, short story collection (Two Suns Books, 2021)
- From the Mirror, Reflections on Living, Writing, and Dying Well, memoir (Two Suns Books, 2021)
- Marguerite & the Moon Man, novel (Amazon Vella, 2021)
- When All Light Fails, novel (Sourcebooks, 2021)
- The Deepest Black, novel (Sourcebooks, 2022)
- Ten Easy Steps to Becoming a Writer, nonfiction (Two Suns Books, 2024)
- Finding Happiness in an Unhappy World, nonfiction (Two Suns Books, 2025)
- A Sunday Kind of Love, Vol. I The Poems, (Two Suns Books, 2025)
- A Sunday Kind of Love, Vol. II The Ballads, (Two Suns Books, 2025)
- Marguerite & the Moon Man, novel (Two Suns Books, 2025)
- The Ruin of Us All, novel (Two Suns Books, 2025)
- There Was a Crooked Man, short stories (Two Suns Books, 2025)
- Write My Name in Dust, novel (Two Suns Books, 2025)
- Hurt People, short novel (Two Suns Books, 2025)
