= Agnes Sligh Turnbull =

American writer (1888–1982)

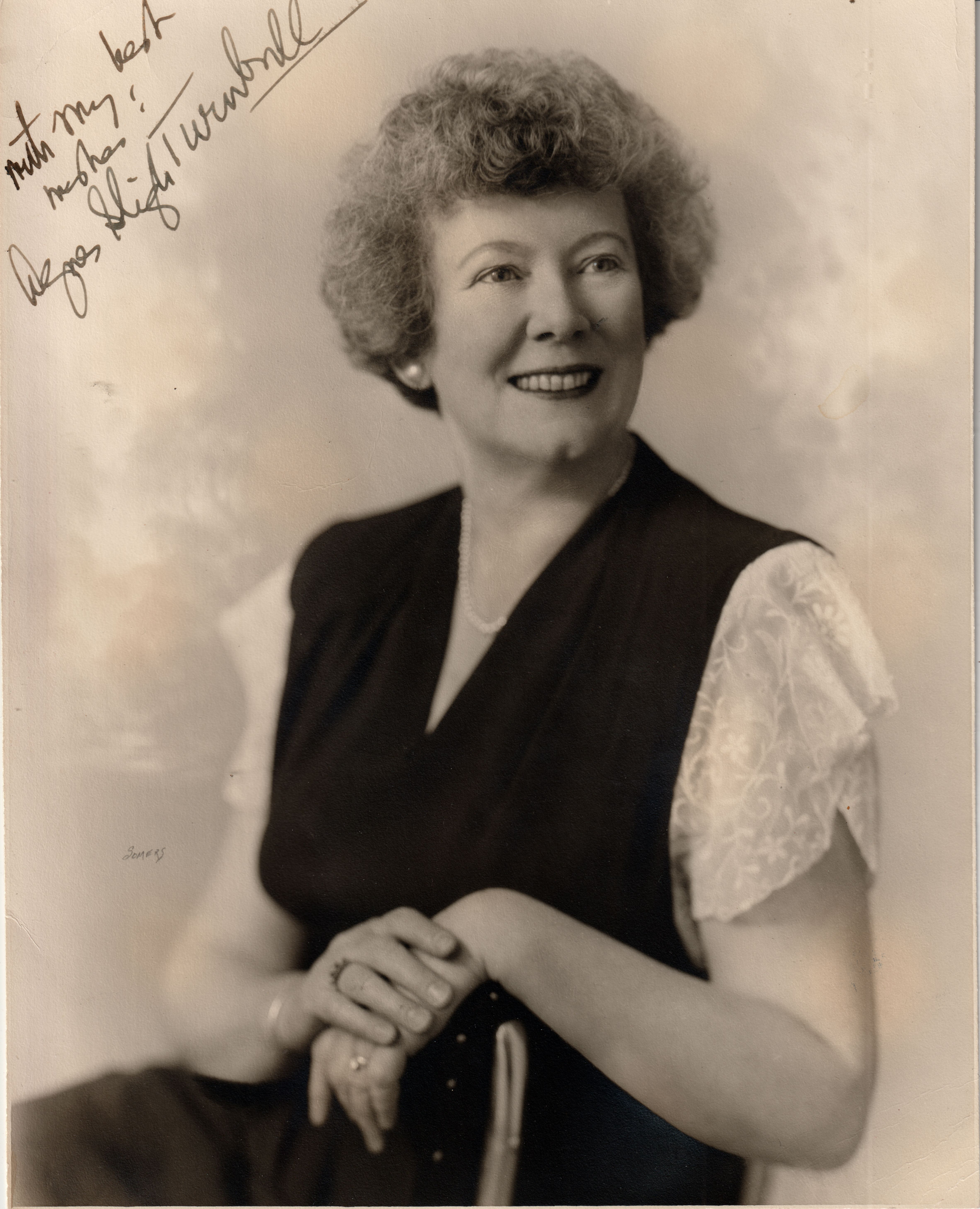
- Seated portrait photo of Agnes Sligh Turnbull
- Born: October 14, 1888 New Alexandria, Pennsylvania, United States
- Died: January 31, 1982 (aged 93) Livingston, New Jersey, United States
- Occupation: Author, Novelist

Agnes Sligh Turnbull (October 14, 1888, New Alexandria, Pennsylvania – January 31, 1982, Livingston, New Jersey) was a bestselling American writer, most noted for her works of historical fiction based in her native Western Pennsylvania.

== Biography ==
Turnbull was the youngest of two daughters born to Alexander Halliday Sligh, an immigrant from Scotland, and Lucinda Hannah McConnell, whose family was among early Scotch-Irish settlers in Westmoreland County, Pennsylvania. Turnbull attended the village school, a boarding school called Washington Female Seminary in 'Little Washington', then enrolled at Indiana State Teachers College (now Indiana University of Pennsylvania or IUP). Turnbull graduated from IUP Phi Beta Kappa and as valedictorian for the class of 1910. She also attended the University of Chicago before starting her career as a high school English teacher.

In 1918, she married James Lyall Turnbull, just before his departure for Europe during World War I. He returned, and they were married for 40 years and had one child, a daughter named Martha. The family moved to Maplewood, New Jersey in 1922, where she lived for the rest of her life.

Turnbull had her first short story published by The American Magazine in 1920, and published further short stories regularly until 1936, when she published her first novel, The Rolling Years.

== Death and interment ==
Turnbull died on January 31, 1982. She is buried in New Alexandria, Pennsylvania.

== Works ==
Turnbull's earliest novels, sometimes called her "Westmoreland Novels", are heavily influenced by Scotch-Irish ethno-religious culture that dominated her upbringing in rural Western Pennsylvania. These early novels have been identifies as offering subtle critiques of religious legalism, patriarchy, and industrial excesses. Over the span of her six-decade writing career, Turnbull's later works were increasingly regarded as having old-fashioned morality, which she and others attributed it to a hopeful outlook on life.

=== Novelettes ===
- In The Garden. New York: Fleming H. Revell, 1926
- The Wife of Pontius Pilate. New York: Fleming H. Revell, 1928
- The Colt That Carried A King. New York: Fleming H. Revell, 1933
- Once To Shout. New York: Macmillan, 1943
- Little Christmas. Boston: Houghton Mifflin, 1964

=== Novels ===
- The Rolling Years. New York: Macmillan, 1936.
- Remember the End. New York: Macmillan, 1938.
- The Day Must Dawn. New York: Macmillan, 1942.
- The Bishop's Mantle. New York: Macmillan, 1947.
- The Gown of Glory. Boston: Houghton Mifflin, 1952.
- The Golden Journey. Boston: Houghton Mifflin, 1955.
- The Nightingale. Boston: Houghton Mifflin, 1960.
- The King's Orchard. Boston: Houghton Mifflin, 1963
- The Wedding Bargain. Boston: Houghton Mifflin, 1966
- Many a Green Isle. Boston: Houghton Mifflin, 1968
- Whistle and I'll Come to You. Boston: Houghton Mifflin, 1970.
- The Flowering. Boston: Houghton Mifflin, 1972.
- The Richlands. Boston: Houghton Mifflin, 1974.
- The Winds of Love. Boston: Houghton Mifflin, 1977.
- The Two Bishops. Boston: Houghton Mifflin, 1980.

=== Collection of short stories ===
- This Spring of Love. New York: Fleming H. Revell, 1924
- Far Above Rubies. New York: Fleming H. Revell, 1926
- The Four Marys. New York: Fleming H. Revell, 1932
- Old Home Town. New York: Fleming H.Revell, 1933

=== Juvenile works ===
- Elijah the Fish-bite. New York: Macmillan, 1940.
- Jed, the Shepherd's Dog. Boston: Houghton Mifflin, 1957.
- George. Boston: Houghton Mifflin, 1964.
- The White Lark. Boston: Houghton Mifflin, 1968.

=== Memoir ===
- Dear Me: Leaves from the Diary of Agnes Sligh Turnbull. New York: Macmillan, 1941.
- Out Of My Heart. Boston: Houghton Mifflin, 1958

== Sources ==
- DeMarr, Mary Jean. "Agnes Sligh Turnbull and the World of the Pennsylvania Scotch-Irish Presbyterians." Journal of Popular Culture 19 (1986): 75–83.
- Halula, Edward K., "Old Home Town", The Sentinel, October 2002.
- Halula, Edward K., "A Nightingale Sang: A Story About Agnes Sligh Turnbull", The Sentinel, Feb. 2003.
- Halula, Edward K., "Two 'Girls' From New Alex", The Sentinel, June 2003.
- Richards, Samuel J. "Middlebrow Bestseller Obscured: Reconsidering Agnes Sligh Turnbull's Westmoreland Novels," Appalachian Journal 52:1–2 (2024–2025): 78–95.
