= The King's Orchard =

1963 novel by Agnes Sligh Turnbull

- First edition
- Author: Agnes Sligh Turnbull
- Cover artist: John O'Hara Cosgrave II
- Language: English
- Publisher: Houghton Mifflin
- Publication date: 1963
- Publication place: USA
- Media type: Print (hardback)
- Pages: 467
- OCLC: 59860900
- Preceded by: The Nightingale
- Followed by: The Flowering

The King's Orchard is a historical novel by the American writer Agnes Sligh Turnbull (1888–1982) based upon the life of James O'Hara (1752?–1819), an American industrialist.

Set in Pittsburgh, Pennsylvania during the early years of the American republic, it is the fictionalized biography of O'Hara, who came to America shortly before the American Revolution from Ireland in 1772 to find adventure and fortune on the Indian frontier. He became a trader, soldier and industrialist. In the novel, O'Hara travels to western Pennsylvania to Fort Pitt, now the site of modern-day Pittsburgh. O'Hara also became Washington's quartermaster during the war, and was prominent in the early history of Pittsburgh. The book includes characters such as George Washington, Guyasuta, Mad Anthony Wayne, and George Rogers Clark.
