= Olive Price =

American writer

- Born: September 21, 1903; Pittsburgh, Pennsylvania
- Died: November 3, 1991 (age 88)
- Other names: Olive Price Cherryholmes, Anne Cherryholmes, Olive M. Price, Barbara West
- Occupations: Writer, playwright

Olive Marie Price Cherryholmes (September 21, 1903 – November 3, 1991) was an American writer of books and plays for children. She was also known as Olive M. Price, and wrote under the pseudonyms of Anne Cherryholmes and Barbara West.

== Early life and education ==
Price was born in Pittsburgh, Pennsylvania, the daughter of Harrison Wilson Price and Lydia Barchfeld Price. Her father was a policeman. She attended the University of Pittsburgh in 1922 and 1923, and was a member of the Kappa Delta sorority there.

== Career ==
Price worked as an advertising copywriter for department stores in Pittsburgh until 1928. She moved to New York City, where she worked in publishing and radio. She wrote short educational plays for classroom use, and children's books. "But they are not only educational," explained a 1929 reviewer of her plays. "They are stirring dramas well worth producing for drama's sake." Her 1948 book Three Golden Rivers was set in 1850s Pittsburgh, and was the book-of-the-month selection for the Catholic Book Club.

== Personal life and legacy ==
Price married salesman and World War I veteran Rosslyn Marcellus Cherryholmes on June 30, 1927. They lived in Nassau County, New York, in 1940, and in Adams, Pennsylvania, in 1950. They bought a house in Bergen, New Jersey, in 1952, and later retired to Ocala, Florida. She died in 1991, at the age of 88; her grave is with her husband's, in the Florida National Cemetery. Three Golden Rivers was reissued in 1999 by the University of Pittsburgh Press, in their Golden Triangle line of children's books.

== Works ==
=== For children ===
- A Donkey for the King, McGraw, 1945.
- Miracle by the Sea, McGraw, 1947.
- Three Golden Rivers, Bobbs-Merrill, 1948.
- The Valley of the Dragon, Bobbs-Merrill, 1951.
- The Story of Marco Polo (selection of Parents' Magazine Book Club, People's Book Club, Boy's Club of America Book Club, and Sear's Book Club), Grosset, 1953.
- The Story of Clara Barton (Boy's Club of America Book Club selection), Grosset, 1954.
- The Glass Mountain, Washburn, 1954.
- The Blue Harbor, Washburn, 1956.
- Snifty, Westminster, 1957.
- The Golden Wheel, Westminster, 1958.
- River Boy, Westminster, 1959.
- Reindeer Island, Westminster, 1960.
- The Phantom Reindeer, Coward, 1961.
- Mystery of the Sunken City, Westminster, 1962.
- The Donkey with Diamond Ears, Coward, 1962.
- The Boy with One Shoe, Coward, 1963.
- The Island of the Silver Spoon (Under pseudonym Anne Cherryholmes), Coward, 1963.
- The Island of the Voyageurs (Under pseudonym Anne Cherryholmes), Coward, 1964.
- The Dog That Watched the Mountain, Coward, 1967.
- Kim Walk-In-My-Shoes (Books for Brotherhood Book Club selection), Coward, 1968.
- Rosa Bonheur: Painter of Animals, Garrad, 1972.

==== Picture books adapted for children from literary classics ====
- Alfred Ollivant, Bob, Son of Battle, 1960.
- Jack London, Call of the Wild, 1961.
- Margaret Sidney, Five Little Peppers and How They Grew, 1963.

==== Books of plays ====
- Short Plays from American History and Literature for Classroom Use: Grade Schools, Samuel French, Volume I, 1925, Volume II, 1928, Volume III, 1929, Volume IV, 1935; Plays for Schools, Baker's Plays, 1927.
- American History in Masque and Wig for Classroom Use, Baker's Plays, 1931.
- Plays for Young Children, U.S. Bicentennial Commission to Celebrate the Bicentennial of George Washington's Birthday, 1932.
- Plays of Far Places, Baker's Plays, 1936.
- Debutante Plays for Girls Twelve to Twenty, Samuel French, 1936.
- Plays of Belles and Beaux: Seven Short Plays for High School and Junior High, Samuel French, 1937.

=== Plays published individually ===
- Lantern Light, Samuel French, 1925.
- The Gateway of Tomorrow (an Americanization play), Scott Mitchell, 1929.
- Upstairs for the Weekend, 1930.
- Washington Marches On, U.S. Bicentennial Celebration, 1931.
- Angelica, Inc., Samuel French, 1937.
- The Young May Moon, Samuel French, 1939.
- Star Eternal, Dramatists Play Service, 1939.
- Holiday Hill, Row, Peterson, 1940.
- When the Bough Breaks, Eldridge Entertainment House, 1940.
- Freshman Bill, Eldridge Entertainment House, 1941.
- Announcing Antonia, Samuel French, 1941.
- Ask for the Moon, Row, Peterson, 1942.
- Sub-Deb Sue, Dramatists Play Service, 1942.
- Family Tree, Row, Peterson, 1943.
- (Under pseudonym Barbara West) Belles in Waiting, Row, Peterson, 1943.
- Out of the Mist, Eldridge Entertainment House, 1943.
- Magic on Main Street (for women), Row, Peterson, 1945.
- Stage Struck, Row, Peterson, 1946.
- Rummage Sale (for women), Row, Peterson, 1946.
- Sparkling Sixteen, Northwestern Press, 1947.
