= Remember the End =

1938 novel by Agnes Sligh Turnbull

- First edition
- Author: Agnes Sligh Turnbull
- Language: English
- Publisher: The Macmillan Company
- Publication date: 1938
- Publication place: USA
- Media type: Print (hardback)
- Pages: 468
- OCLC: 185415
- Preceded by: The Rolling Years
- Followed by: The Day Must Dawn

Remember the End is the second novel by the American writer Agnes Sligh Turnbull (1888–1982) and it is set in Pittsburgh, Pennsylvania from the 1890s to World War I.

The protagonist Alex MacTay is a Scotsman who is called to be a poet, but instead emigrates to America. On a farm in Western Pennsylvania he forms a partnership in a coal mine, marries the farmer's daughter, and suppresses his aesthetic interests. By age 34 he owns two coal mines and has made his first million, but at the cost of deeply wounding his wife and alienating his only son. Sympathetically portrayed, he typifies the strengths and weaknesses of the great tycoons of the period, such as his own model, Andrew Carnegie. During the 1907 depression he gets control of a steel mill, but then things go sour for MacTay.
