= Phillip Bonosky =

American novelist

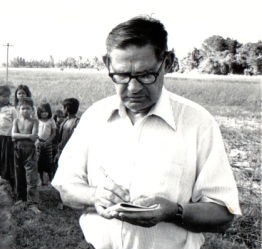
Phillip Bonosky in Cambodia (1980, after the defeat of Pol Pot and the Khmer Rouge)

Phillip Bonosky (March 7, 1916 – March 2, 2013) was an American novelist, journalist, and labor activist. A lifelong Communist, he wrote the coming-of-age novel Burning Valley and worked as cultural editor and Moscow correspondent for the Daily World. Bonosky was one of the first U.S. journalists to visit communist China and one of the few to interview Vietnamese revolutionary leader Ho Chi Minh.

== Background ==
Bonosky was born in 1916 in Duquesne, Pennsylvania, the fourth of eight children, to Lithuanian immigrant parents.

== Early career ==
As an adolescent he worked in the Duquesne Steel Works, but lost his job in the Great Depression and left home to find work. Norman Markowitz writes, "Bonosky joined large numbers of unemployed youth to ride the rails in the early 1930s, and eventually found himself in Washington, DC, living in a warehouse for transients that the early Roosevelt administration had provided."

== Social activism ==
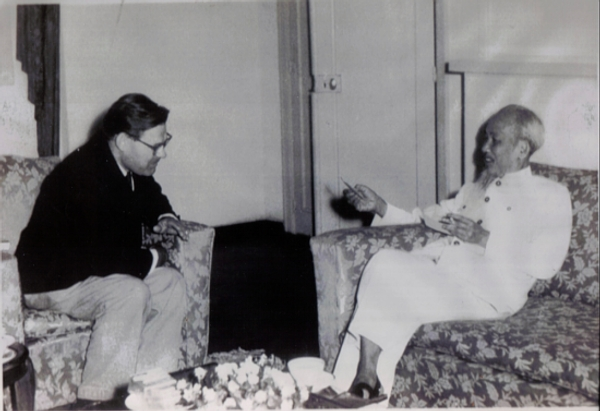
Philip Bonosky interviewing Ho Chi Minh in Hanoi (1960)

While in Washington, D.C., Bonosky befriended the social worker Ann Terry White, wife of Treasury Department official Harry Dexter White. With her financial assistance, Bonosky enrolled in Wilson Teachers College and soon joined the Communist Party USA. (In 1948, when Harry Dexter White was investigated by the House Committee on Un-American Activities (HUAC) for possible Communist ties, letters exchanged between his wife and Bonosky were seized by government investigators as evidence against him.) In 1940, as President of the Washington division of the Workers Alliance of America, Bonosky worked for the American Peace Committee to stop US entry into World War 2. He met with Eleanor Roosevelt to discuss government cuts in Works Progress Administration programs, an event that was reported in the press. When the American Peace Committee changed its name to the American People's Committee in June 1941, and advocated US entry into the war, Bonosky worked for war aid to the Soviet Union. By the time the U.S. entered World War II, Bonosky was a full-time organizer for the Communist Party. Bonosky would go on to become one of the leading voices in the Party, described by it as ‘fighting for the rights of working-class people’.

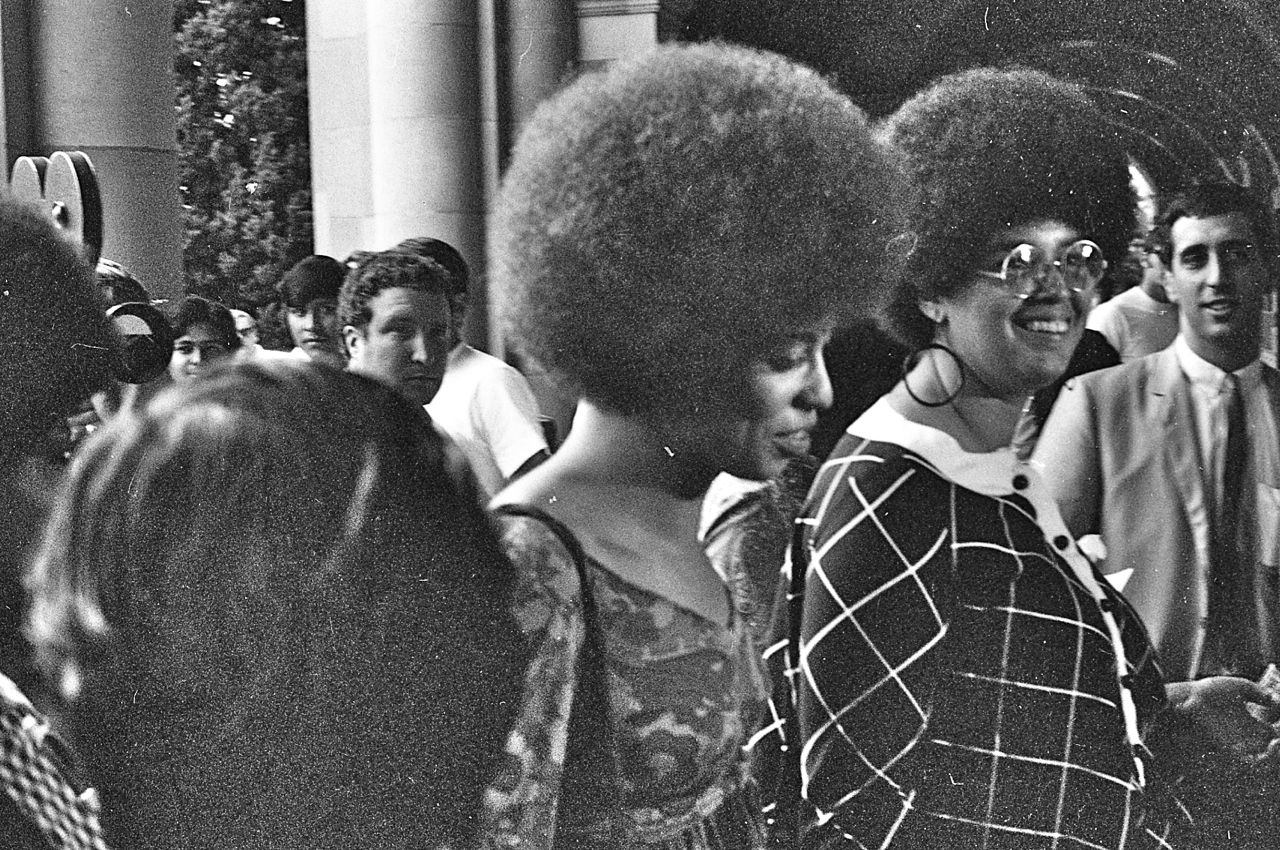
Angela Davis (here, 1969) was a long-time friend of Bonosky's

Friend and, for a time, fellow Communist Party member Angela Davis quoted Bonosky as giving his view of the period. He said that the 1930s were a "watershed in the American democratic tradition. It is a period which will continue to serve both the present and the future as a reminder and an example of how an aroused people, led and spurred on by the working-class, can change the entire complexion of the culture of a nation."

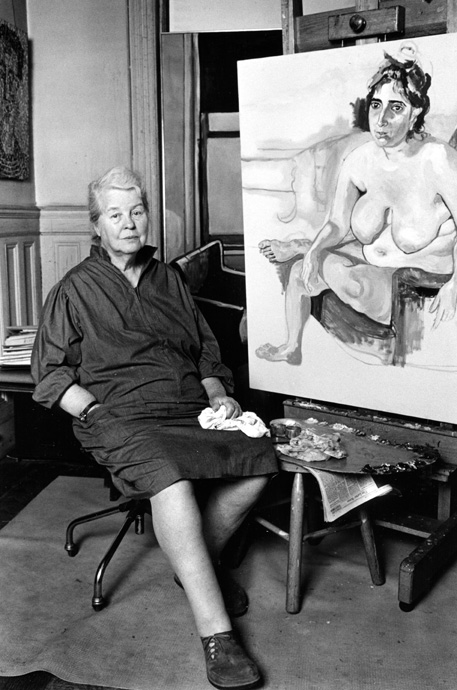
Alice Neel (here, 1973) was a lifelong friend of Bonosky's

In 1948, Bonosky began a lifelong friendship with the painter Alice Neel, detailed in the 2007 documentary film Alice Neel and in the Neel biography Alice Neel: The Art of Not Sitting Pretty by Phoebe Hoban. Hoban describes the first meeting between Bonosky and Neel: "Bonosky first met Neel at the offices of Masses & Mainstream, where he was an editor (as was Mike Gold). Neel asked him to sit for a portrait, and in early March 1948, he came up to her apartment every afternoon for a week, posing between one and four." Bonosky later organized an exhibition of Neel's paintings in Moscow.

== Death ==
Bonosky died age 96 on March 2, 2013, in Brooklyn, New York.

== Works ==
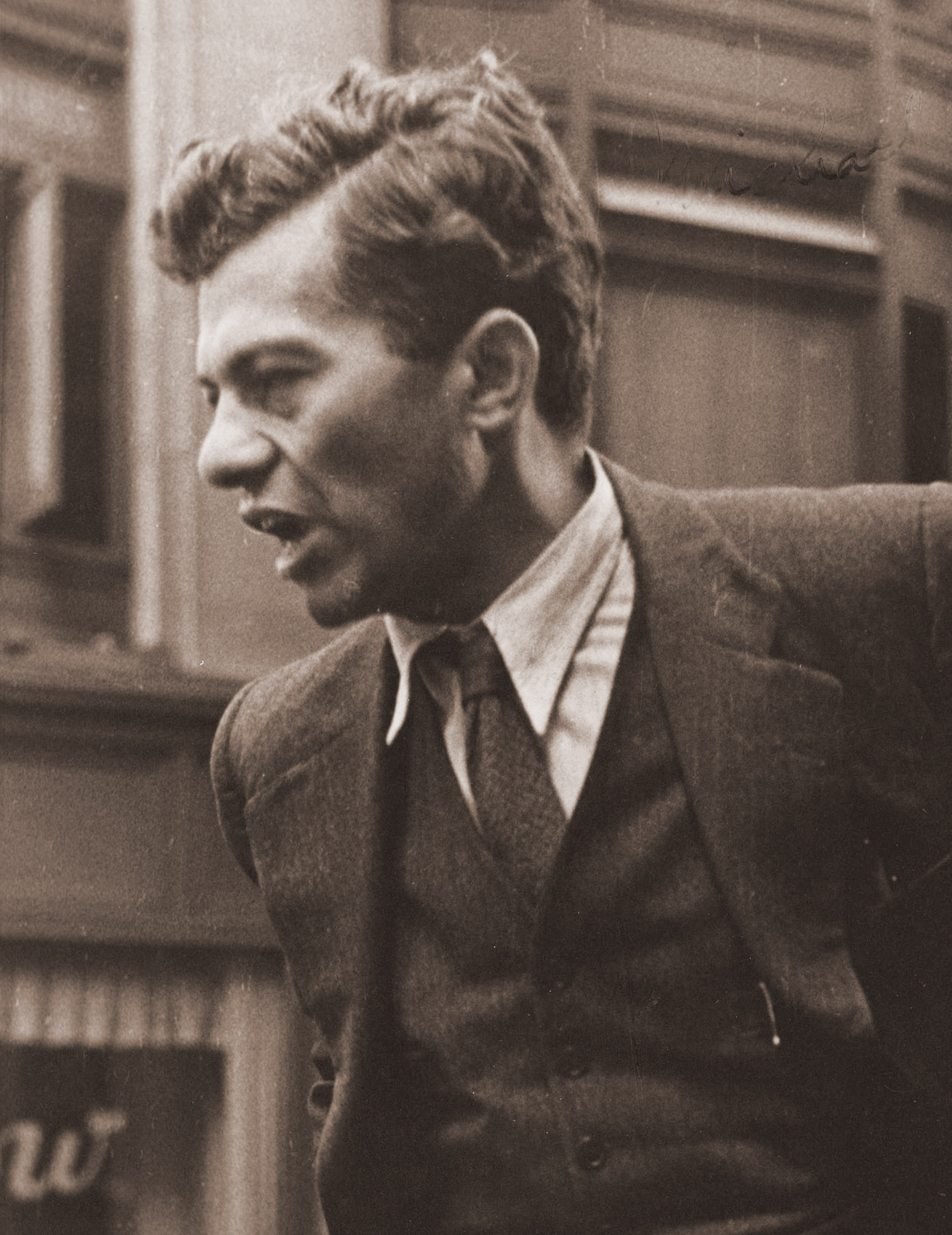
Mike Gold wrote that Bonosky's Burning Valley "adds a burning page to the story of the immigrant workers who built the heavy industry of America"

Bonosky published his first novel, Burning Valley, in 1953, and contributed to the literary journal Masses & Mainstream throughout the 1950s. His second novel, The Magic Fern, was published in 1960. In the 1960s, Bonosky interviewed Vietnamese president Ho Chi Minh and became cultural editor for the Communist Party newspaper Daily World. He interviewed Afghan leaders in the 1980s, and was one of the first Western journalists to visit Cambodia after the removal of the Khmer Rouge. He has published several collections of his work, including Beyond the Borders of Myth: From Vilnius to Hanoi (1967), Afghanistan: Washington’s Secret War (1985), Devils in Amber: The Baltics (1992. He published a collection of short stories, A Bird in Her Hair, in 1987.

His literary agent was Maxim Lieber.

Burning Valley is a 1953 coming-of-age novel set in the steel valley of Pittsburgh, Pennsylvania during the 1920s. It tells the story of Benedict Bulmanis, son of an immigrant Lithuanian steelworker, who feels called to the Roman Catholic priesthood, but is torn by local political events as steelworkers struggle to organize in the face of corporate expansion. The novel is largely based on Bonosky's own life and that of his father, both of whom worked in steel mills. While the novel received praise throughout the Soviet Union, China, and other socialist countries, it received little attention in the U.S. French writer and philosopher Simone de Beauvoir said, "I love very much the novel Burning Valley: It is rare to find a good book about the working class written by one of them." Author and literary critic Mike Gold wrote, "This novel ... adds a burning page to the story of the immigrant workers who built the heavy industry of America."

Books

- Burning Valley (1953)
- The Magic Fern (1960)
- Beyond the Borders of Myth: From Vilnius to Hanoi (1967)
- Afghanistan: Washington’s Secret War (1985)
- A Bird in Her Hair (1987)
- Devils in Amber: The Baltics (1992)
