= Lloyd L. Brown =

American journalist

Lloyd Louis Brown
- Born: April 3, 1913; St. Paul, Minnesota, U.S.
- Died: April 1, 2003 (aged 89); New York City, U.S.
- Occupation: Labor Organizer, Novelist, journalist, Communist Party activist
- Years active: c. 1929–1997
- Movement: Labor movement, Communist movement
- Children: 2

Lloyd Louis Brown (April 3, 1913 – April 1, 2003) was an American labor organizer, Communist Party activist, journalist, novelist, friend and editorial companion of Paul Robeson's, and a Robeson biographer.

== Early life ==
Brown was born Lloyd Dight in St. Paul, Minnesota, son of African-American Ralph Dight, a waiter originally from Alabama, and Magdalena Paul Dight, from Stearns County, Minnesota.

Brown and his three siblings were raised Roman Catholic and attended St. Peter Claver Church in St. Paul, an African-American parish. After Magdalena Dight died in 1917 Brown and his brother Ralph lived first in the Catholic Orphan Asylum in Minneapolis, then for two years in the Crispus Attucks Home, an African-American orphanage and old folks home in St. Paul.

== Education ==
Brown attended the Cathedral School through eighth grade, then Cretin (now Cretin-Derham Hall) After receiving a reprimand in catechism class he quit school and educated himself for a year at the St. Paul Public Library. He also joined the Young Communist League (then known as the Young Workers League.)

== Labor organizing ==
In 1929 Brown left St. Paul for Youngstown, Ohio, to work in the steel mills there. Because of the stock market crash of that year no steel jobs could be had, so Brown found work of a different sort: at the age of 16 he became a Communist labor organizer. He then took the surname Brown in honor of the anti-slavery activist John Brown. Lloyd Brown spent the next decade as a labor organizer in Ohio, New Jersey, Connecticut, and Pennsylvania, and also visited the Soviet Union as a journalist. His labor organizing in Western Pennsylvania landed him a stint in the Allegheny County Jail in Pittsburgh. After release he joined the US Army Air Corps and rose to the rank of sergeant.

== Literary career ==
After World War II Brown moved to New York City and began writing, first for the weekly The New Masses, and then its successor, the monthly Masses & Mainstream, both Marxist journals. Brown wrote on labor organizing, lynchings, baseball, among other topics, plus fiction and editorials. He served as managing editor of New Masses from 1946 to 1948 and associate editor of Masses & Mainstream from 1948 to 1952. In this literary environment Brown worked with celebrated leftist writers such as Dalton Trumbo, Meridel LeSueur, Herbert Aptheker, and, of greatest consequence to Brown, Paul Robeson.

In 1951 Brown published a novel, Iron City, based on his experiences in Allegheny County Jail, the fictionalized tale of his and other inmates’ efforts to save Willie Jones, condemned to death for murder.

Brown began working with Paul Robeson in 1950, helped him write his column for the Harlem newspaper, Freedom, and 1958 his autobiography, Here I Stand. In 1997 he published a partial biography, The Young Paul Robeson: On My Journey Now. In 2001 the Minnesota Historical Society republished, in its quarterly magazine Minnesota History, Brown’s 1948 fictionalized memoir of his years at the Crispus Attucks Home, God’s Chosen People, with a context-setting introduction.

== Later life ==
Brown lived his last decades in New York City. He and his wife, Lily Brown, of a New York Jewish family, had two daughters, Bonnie and Linda. Lily Brown died in 1996; a playground in Fort Washington Park is named for her. Lloyd Brown died in New York on April 1, 2003.
