= Three Golden Rivers =

1948 novel by Olive Price

- First edition
- Author: Olive Price
- Language: English
- Genre: Novel
- Publisher: Bobbs-Merrill
- Publication date: 1948
- Publication place: USA
- Media type: Print (hardback)
- Pages: 272
- ISBN: 0-8229-5707-8
- OCLC: 5161542

Three Golden Rivers is a historical, young-adult novel by the American writer Olive Price.

Set in 1850, it tells the story of four orphaned siblings who must leave the family farm after their father is killed and head to Pittsburgh, Pennsylvania, to find work. The children land in a multi-ethnic neighborhood where Stephen befriends a Scottish lad named Andrew Carnegie.

== Sources ==
- Contemporary Authors Online. The Gale Group, 2002. PEN (Permanent Entry Number): 0000079845.
