= Kathleen George =

American professor and writer (born 1943)

- Born: Kathleen Elizabeth George; July 7, 1943 (age 83) Johnstown, Pennsylvania, U.S.
- Occupation: Professor; writer
- Education: University of Pittsburgh (BA, MA, PhD)
- Notable works: Taken (2001); Fallen (2004); Afterimage (2007)
- Spouse: Hilary Masters

Kathleen Elizabeth George (born July 7, 1943) is an American professor and writer best known for her series of crime novels set in Pittsburgh, Pennsylvania. She teaches theatre arts at the University of Pittsburgh and fiction writing at the Chatham University Low-Residency MFA Program in Creative Writing.

== Early life and education ==
She was born in Johnstown, Pennsylvania and educated at the University of Pittsburgh: B.A. in English (1964), M.A. in theatre arts (1966), Ph.D. in theatre arts (1975), and M.F.A. in creative writing (1988).

Between 1968 and 1998 She directed numerous plays for Carlow College (where she taught), ‘the University of Pittsburgh, where she is a Professor, and The Three Rivers Shakespeare Festival, a professional summer company at Pitt.

She teaches playwriting, dramatic literature, and sometimes creative writing at Pitt.

== Personal life ==
Her husband was writer Hilary Masters, a professor of English at Carnegie Mellon University and son of Edgar Lee Masters, until his death on June 14, 2015.

She lives in Pittsburgh's Mexican War Streets.

== Works ==
- Rhythm in Drama, (Pittsburgh: University of Pittsburgh Press, 1980)
- Playwriting: The First Workshop, (Boston: Focal Press, 1994)
- The Man in the Buick and Other Stories, (Kansas City: BkMk Press, University of Missouri, 1999)
- Taken, novel (New York: Delacorte, 2001)
- Fallen, novel (New York: Dell, 2004)
- Winter's Tales: Reflections on the Novelistic Stage, (Newark: University of Delaware Press, 2005)
- Afterimage, novel (New York: Thomas Dunne Books, 2007)
- The Odds, novel (New York: Minotaur Books, 2009). Edgar finalist for Best Novel.
- Hideout, Minotaur, 2011
- Simple, Minotaur, 2012
- A Measure of Blood Mysterious 2013
- . Pittsburgh Noir. Akashic 2011
- . The Johnstown Girls U. Of Pittsburgh Press, 2014
- . The Blues Walked In. U. Of Pittsburgh Press, 2018
- . Mirth Regal Press, 2022

== Sources ==
- Contemporary Authors Online. The Gale Group, 2006. PEN (Permanent Entry Number): 0000142340.
