= Katherine Ayres =

American writer of children's literature

- Born: 1947 (age 78–79); Columbus, Ohio, United States
- Occupations: Educator and author of children's literature

Katherine Ayres is an American writer of children's literature and resident of Pittsburgh, Pennsylvania. She is a founding member of the Pittsburgh Public Theater's Playwrights’ Lab. In 2008, she described herself as "a poster child for early literacy."

== Early life ==
Born in 1947 in Columbus, Ohio, she was raised in Ohio, West Virginia, and New York. In 1965 she graduated from West Islip High School in West Islip, New York. She completed her BA at The College of Wooster in 1969 and her MA at Tufts University in 1974.

== Career ==
Ayres was employed as an educator and elementary school principal during the early phase of her professional life. She began writing for children in the 1990s. In 2008, Ayres traveled throughout Pennsylvania, reading her book, Up, Down, and Around, to preschool-aged children participating in the Pennsylvania One Book, Every Young Child literacy program. Roughly ninety thousand copies of her book were distributed to childcare and Head Start centers, family literacy programs and public libraries across Pennsylvania as part of the program, which was estimated to reach as may as five hundred thousand children that year. That same year, her poem, Roadside Shrine, was published in the Pittsburgh Post-Gazette.

Ayres coordinates the Chatham University Master of Fine Arts Program in Children’s and Adolescent Writing in Pittsburgh.

== Books ==
- Family Tree, fiction (New York: Delacorte Press, 1996).
- North by Night: A Story of the Underground Railroad, fiction (New York: Delacorte Press, 1998).
- Voices at Whisper Bend, fiction (Middleton, Wisconsin: Pleasant Company, 1999).
- Silver Dollar Girl, fiction (New York: Delacorte Press, 2000).
- Under Copp's Hill, fiction (Middleton, Wisconsin: Pleasant Company, 2000).
- Stealing South: A Story of the Underground Railroad, fiction (New York: Delacorte Press, 2001).
- A Long Way, fiction (Cambridge: Candlewick Press, 2003).
- Macaroni Boy, fiction (New York: Delacorte Press, 2003).
- Matthew's Truck, fiction (Cambridge: Candlewick Press, 2005).
- Up, Down, and Around, fiction (Cambridge: Candlewick Press, 2007).

== Sources ==
Contemporary Authors Online. The Gale Group, 2002.
