= Ann Finlayson =

English artist

Ann Finlayson Adams
- Born: Ann Elizabeth Finlayson; 6 November 1941; Glasgow, Scotland
- Died: 10 June 1999 (aged 57); Riverside, Thorpe, England
- Education: Glasgow School of Art; Kingston School of Art; Royal College of Art
- Occupation: Artist
- Spouse: John Barham Adams (m. 1995)

Ann Finlayson (6 November 1941 - 10 June 1999) was an English painter, draughtsperson and teacher. She worked as an assistant to Bridget Riley and Peter Sedgley from 1969 to 1971. She was best known for her abstract watercolours.

== Personal life and education ==
Ann Elizabeth Finlayson was born in Glasgow, the daughter of artist Helen Hay. She studied at the Glasgow School of Art in 1960, the Kingston School of Art from 1960 to 1964 and the Royal College of Art from 1965 to 1968. She won the E. Q. Henriques gift at the Royal College of Art in 1968 and the Daler-Rowney watercolour award at the Royal Academy of Arts in 1984. She married ceramicist John Barham Adams in Surrey, England in 1995.

== Art career ==
Finlayson worked as an assistant to Bridget Riley and Peter Sedgley between 1969 and 1971. She worked as an assistant to Alistair Grant in 1971 and assisted Leonard Rosoman with large scale murals from 1972 to 1974. She worked as an assistant to Ken Baynes, an exhibition consultant for the Welsh Arts Council, from 1972 to 1976.

=== Solo exhibitions ===
1969 – New Art Centre, Sloane Street
1975 – Triad Gallery
1976 – Oxford Gallery, London
1982 – Stirling Gallery
1985 – Adam Gallery, London
1997 – Thornton Bevan Arts, London

=== Group exhibitions ===
1985 – Artists Against Apartheid
1994 – London Guildhall University
1974 – Oxford Gallery
2019 – “Works on paper” Trent Art Gallery, Newcastle Under Lyme

=== Royal Academy Summer exhibitions ===
Finlayson had the following works selected for the Royal Academy Summer Exhibition:
1970: Exploding Rectangle
1972: Maze, Release and Volcano
1973: Silent Spaces, Bands of Time and Metamorphosis
1974: Black Diamond Vortex
1975: Wind and Reflection
1976: Waves
1980: Tapestry
1981: Pools
1982: Sunlit Flower and Tulip
1983: Four Objects
1984: Sea Edge and Sea Horizon
1985: Window 1
1987: The Child is Mother of the Woman (ink, charcoal, pastel)

=== Collections ===
Her work is held privately and in the following public collections:

- Bolton Museum of Art
- Bank of Boston, London
- Glyndebourne Opera House
- Hamilton Education Centre, Scotland

== Teaching ==
- 1970 – 1971: Exeter College of Art and Design, visiting lecturer
- 1971 – 1972: Vauxhall Manor Secondary School
- 1976 – 1978: City and Guilds of London Art School, part-time lecturer
- 1976 – 1990: Kingston Polytechnic
- 1978 – 1984: Berkshire College of Art
- 1984 – 1985: London Guildhall University(Sir John Cass)

== Illness and death ==
Adams was diagnosed with multi-system atrophy, similar to Parkinson's disease, in 1995. She was told she had between five and ten years to live. Unable to create art and finding it “difficult to come to terms with her illness” she committed suicide on 10 June 1999, age 57. Together with a suicide note, she left “literature about voluntary euthanasia.” Following her death, Finlayson's husband lodged a formal complaint with the government, calling for a “radical improvement in arrangements between police detectives, officers and surgeons” in order to reduce stress on the bereaved.
