= New Alexandria, Virginia =

Unincorporated community in Virginia, United States

- Unincorporated community
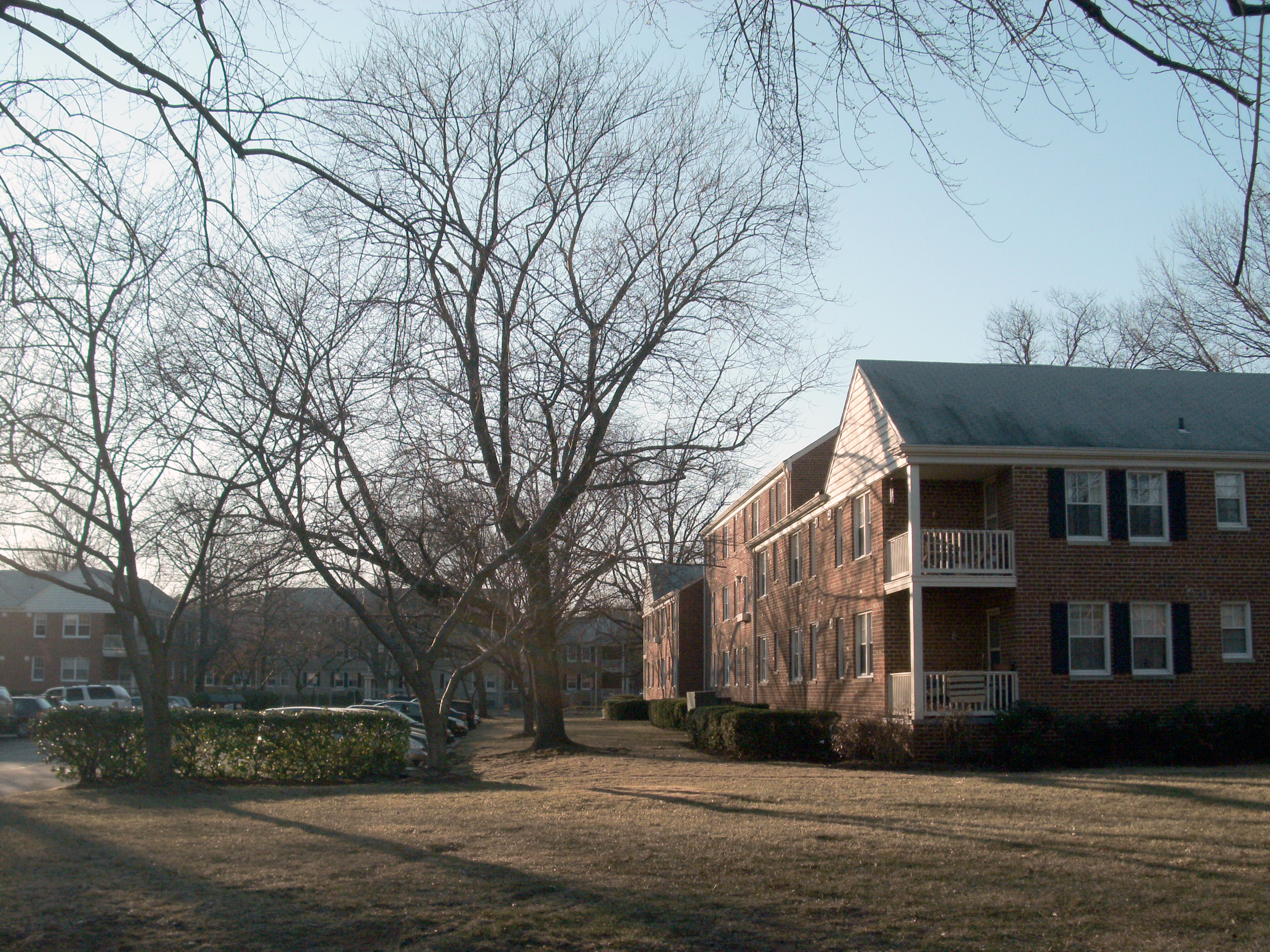
- Condominium complex in the New Alexandria area of Belle View

- Location within Northern Virginia Location within Virginia Location within the United States
- Coordinates: 38°46′35″N 77°03′24″W
- Country: United States
- State: Virginia
- County: Fairfax
- City: Belle Haven
- Time zone: UTC−5 (Eastern (EST))
  - Summer (DST): UTC−4 (EDT)
- GNIS feature ID: 1493340

New Alexandria is an unincorporated community in the census-designated place of Belle Haven, in Fairfax County, Virginia, United States. It comprises large homes, condominiums, and a major shopping center. New Alexandria was founded in 1892.
