= The Autobiography of My Body =

1991 novel by David Guy

- First edition
- Author: David Guy
- Language: English
- Publisher: Dutton
- Publication date: 1991
- Publication place: United States
- Media type: Print (hardback)
- Pages: 320 pp
- ISBN: 0-525-24974-5
- OCLC: 22311079
- Dewey Decimal: 813/.54 20
- LC Class: PS3557.U89 A94 1991

The Autobiography of My Body is the fourth novel by the American author David Guy, set in 1980s Pittsburgh, Pennsylvania.

It tells the story of the sexual liberation of Charles Bradford, who after a bad marriage has returned to his hometown to be near his ailing father. There he meets Andrea, a feminist and political activist, and they start a torrid affair that forces him to reexamine his life.

== Reaction ==
The New York Times called it "an intimate portrait of a man torn between appetite and intellect, a sort of Portnoy's Complaint for gentiles" and a "painstaking explication of habit and longing" in an ambiguous review.
