= Mary Greenway McClelland =

American novelist

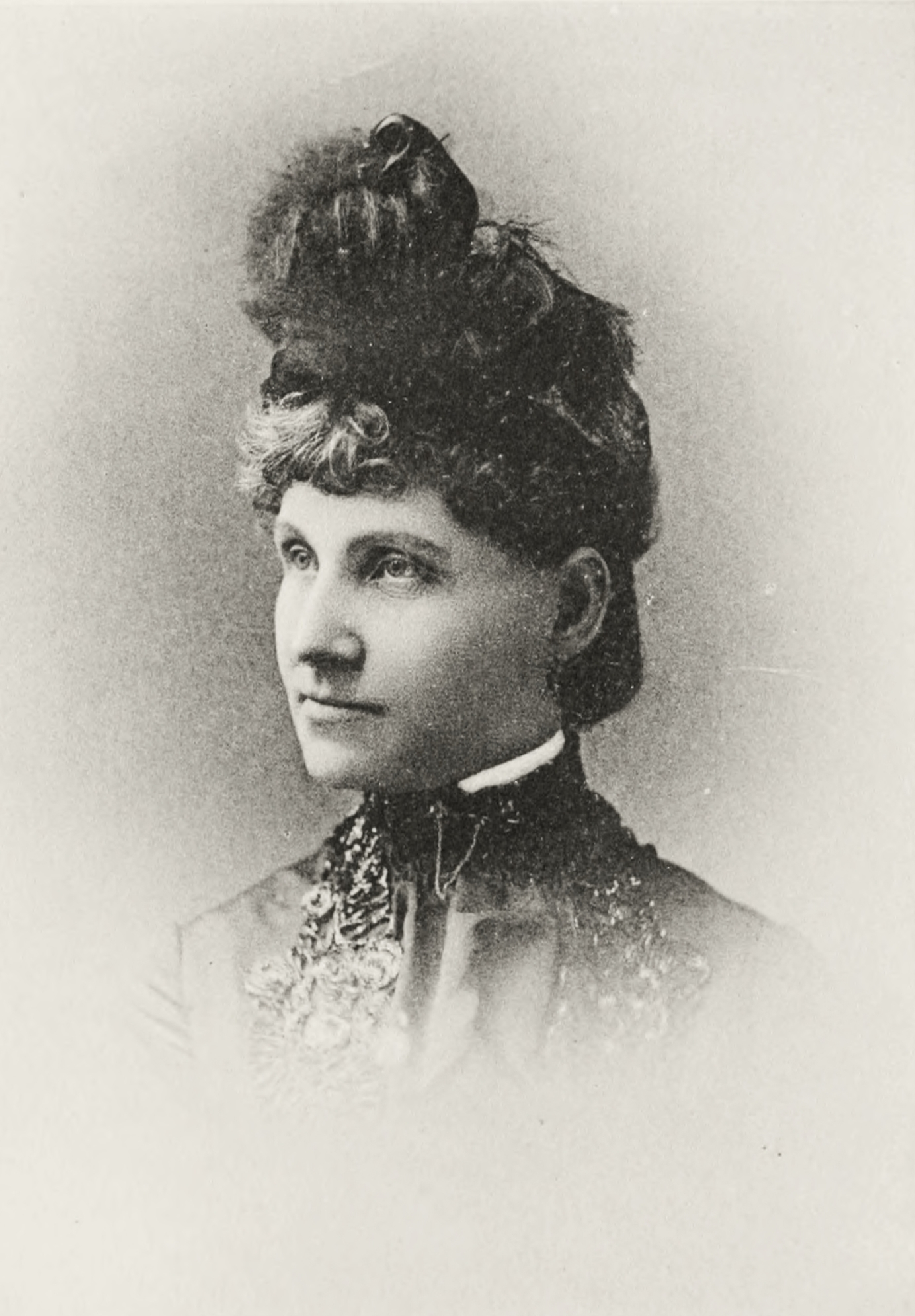
- Born: August 5, 1853; Norwood
- Died: August 2, 1895 (aged 41)
- Occupation: Writer

Mary Greenway McClelland (August 5, 1853 – August 2, 1895) was an American novelist who wrote under the name M. G. McClelland.

Mary Greenway McClelland was born on August 5, 1853, in Norwood, a small village in Nelson County, Virginia. She was the daughter of Thomas Stanhope McClelland, a planter, and Maria Louisa Graf, the daughter of a German-born Baltimore merchant. When she was young, her parents moved to Elm Cottage, an isolated home in Buckingham County, Virginia where she spent the rest of her life.

Her first publication was Ole Ike's Memories (1884), a 16-page collection of poems in African-American dialect. She went on to publish many novels, mostly through publisher Henry Holt and Co. She published in magazines including Lippincott's Monthly, Youth's Companion, and Harper's Monthly. She also served on the editorial staff of Peterson's Magazine.

Her novels have attracted little critical notice after the 19th century. Several authors have taken note of the love triangle in Broadoaks, where a Northern and a Southern man compete for the affections of the same woman. Cratis D. Williams criticized the portrayal of Southern mountaineers in three of her novels, writing that "her interpretations lack the ring of authenticity. Her knowledge of her subjects had been gathered from frontier fiction, magazine stories, and hearsay."

She died of tuberculosis at Elm Cottage on August 2, 1895.

== Bibliography ==
- Oblivion (1885)
- Princess (1886)
- Jean Monteith (1887)
- A Self-Made Man (1887)
- Madame Silva [also The Ghost of Dred Power] (1888),
- Burkett's Lock (1889)
- Eleanor Gwynn (1890)
- The Bite That Kills (1891)
- A Nameless Novel (1891)
- Manitou Island (1892)
- Broadoaks (1893)
- The Old Post-Road (1894)
- Mammy Mystic (1895)
- St. John's Wooing (1895)
- Sam (1906)
