= Macaroni Boy =

2004 novel by Katherine Ayres

- Yearling Books edition cover.
- Author: Katherine Ayres
- Language: English
- Genre: Historical Fiction
- Publisher: Yearling Books
- Publication date: 2004
- Publication place: United States
- Media type: Print Paperback
- Pages: 192 pp
- ISBN: 0-440-41884-4
- OCLC: 49799270

Macaroni Boy is a children's historical novel by the American writer Katherine Ayres.

It is set in 1933 in Pittsburgh, Pennsylvania during the Great Depression and tells the story of sixth-grader Mike Costa. His large Italian-American family owns a food warehouse in the Strip District, but the school bully taunts him, calling him Macaroni Boy. Mike is the store's rat killer, and when he checks his traps he is catching fewer. Mike eventually discovers a connection between the dying rats and his grandfather's illness. Mike's best friend, Joseph, helps Mike solve this great mystery
