= Here I Stand (book) =

1958 book by Paul Robeson

- First edition
- Author: Paul Robeson
- Language: English
- Publisher: Othello Associates
- Publication date: 1958
- Pages: 128

Here I Stand is a 1958 book written by Paul Robeson with the collaboration of Lloyd L. Brown. While Robeson wrote many articles and speeches, Here I stand is his only book. It has been described as part manifesto, part autobiography. It was published by Othello Associates and dedicated to his wife Eslanda Goode Robeson.

== Contents ==
Foreword

Robeson acknowledges his roots and dedicates himself to winning freedom for his people in America. He says he intends the book not to be an autobiography, but one that gives insight into his thinking.

Prologue

Robeson recalls his childhood and upbringing.

I Take My Stand

Robeson traces his development as actor/ singer from America to England which became his home from 1927 to 1939. There, he started to learn more about Africa, its cultures and languages. In 1934 he travelled to the Soviet Union where he says he experienced an absence of racism. He opines that communism would be helpful to overcome colonialism. Robeson affirms his belief in socialism, but also asserts that he never joined the Communist party. Robeson discusses his remarks at the World Peace Conference at Paris in 1948 where he asked Blacks to realize that the fight for a free world begins at home and the reactions to his speech. He says he fully concurs with the Ten Principles of Bandung.

Love Will Find Out the Way

Robeson says that while in England he connected to the common man, "This belief in the oneness of humankind.. has existed within me side by side with the deep attachment to the cause of my own race", a concept he first felt through song. With the rise of fascism in Europe in the thirties, he says he recognized that the struggle for black liberation was inseparable from the anti-fascist struggle. He further relates that he managed to maintain some international bonds during the years he has been restricted from travelling abroad by the State Department's revocation of his passport, and describes how the documentary The Song of the Rivers was created.

Our Right to Travel

Robeson's passport was revoked in 1950 and he argues this was done because he is a spokesperson for Black people and their freedom. He describes his position as fighting for freedom, and as being "American", while describing the State Department and John Foster Dulles's position as "un-American". He says that he right to travel is an important part of full citizenship. He acquaints the reader with Ira Aldridge who could only achieve artistic greatness by travelling abroad, and says of W. E. B. Du Bois, whose passport had also been revoked, that his presence at international congresses would have enhanced the standing of the United States.

The Time Is Now

Robeson, rejecting segregation and gradualism, demands full citizenship for Black people immediately. He views the people of the newly freed nations in Africa and Asia as natural allies of the Black cause. Realizing that he cannot change individual prejudice, he demands that racist laws limiting Black equality must end.

The Power of Negro Action

Robeson argues that the moral support of the American people would be on the side of the Black people when they claim their "lawful rights with... earnestness, dignity, and determination..." He says that Black people have the power of numbers, of organization, and of spirit to be successful now, and that important examples have been set such as the Prayer Pilgrimage for Freedom in Washington DC on May 17, 1957, and events in Little Rock and Montgomery. Robeson calls for concerted action and effective leadership.

Our Children, Our World

In the epilogue Robeson is optimistic. He says that progress has been made, as seen in Little Rock, that the appearance of Sputnik sends a message to work for peace, and that racism is the enemy.

== Appendix ==
The 1971 Appendix contains a number of essays, including one by Benjamin C. Robeson about "My Brother, Paul," and a statement by the author after having regained his passport. Also, Robeson includes an essay about the significance of the pentatonic scale. He claims to have discovered common links in folk songs though the use of the pentatonic scale and opines that this pattern also extends into Chinese and African languages. The last section contains "A Later Statement by the Author" from August 1964 that reviews the progress in the struggle for freedom of the Black people, ending with "we surely can sing together: "Thank God Almighty, we're moving!"

== 1971 Preface ==
In 1971, Lloyd L. Brown added the Preface to the book upon its reprinting. He recalls the difficult position Robeson was placed in when his rights as a citizen were denied although he was never charged with an illegal action. Robeson's book, Brown asserts, is indispensable to understand his viewpoint. The preface describes the initial reception of the book. It was ignored by the mainstream American press and not even mentioned in new book sections, in contrast to the black, left-wing and foreign press. Brown sees him as the "Great Forerunner" of Black liberation.

== Summation ==
The title echoes Martin Luther's famous statement in front of worldly authorities. The book is partly biographical, partly a manifesto. Robeson says that his primary allegiance is to his "own people" and that the trade-unions and the black church are the vanguard institutions. He declares that he is a "scientific socialist", a reference to a term made famous by Friedrich Engels. He says that the time for black liberation is in the present, calls for unity, and maintains that this liberation must be directed by Black leaders, not by outside organizations that have other interests. While the white mainstream press largely ignored the book, the black press did not. "I Am Not a Communist Says Robeson" was the headline in The Afro-American. The first edition was sold out within six weeks and Robeson reemerged after his enforced banishment.

== See also ==
Paul Robeson: Here I Stand, 1999 documentary
