= Burning Valley =

1953 novel by Phillip Bonosky

- First edition
- Author: Phillip Bonosky
- Language: English
- Genre: Proletarian literature
- Publisher: Masses & Mainstream
- Publication date: October 1953
- Publication place: USA
- Media type: Print (hardback)
- Pages: 288
- OCLC: 37315232

Burning Valley is a 1953 coming-of-age novel by the American writer Phillip Bonosky set in the steel valley of Pittsburgh, Pennsylvania during the 1920s. It was originally published in the Communist Party publication Masses and Mainstream. In 1998 it was reprinted as part of the series "The Radical Novel Reconsidered" by the University of Illinois Press.

The novel tells the story of Benedict Bulmanis, son of an immigrant Lithuanian steelworker, who feels called to the Roman Catholic priesthood, but is torn by local political events as steelworkers struggle to organize in the face of corporate expansion. Banks and millowners plan to clear land in the Monongahela River Valley for a new steel mill, but it means forcing workers from their homes. This expansion and technological upgrading will increase production but lay off thousands. The workers and homeless rebel, in an echo of the Steel strike of 1919, and young Benedict must choose sides.
