= Ellen Litman =

American novelist (born 1973)

- Born: 1973 (age 52–53); Moscow, Russia (emigrated to the United States in 1992)
- Education: Syracuse University (Master of Fine Arts, 2004); Wisconsin Institute for Creative Writing (fellowship, 2004)
- Occupations: Associate professor and associate director of the Creative Writing Program, University of Connecticut
- Writing career
- Genre: Fiction
- Notable awards: Rona Jaffe Foundation Writers' Award (2006)

Ellen Litman (born 1973) is an American novelist. She received the Rona Jaffe Foundation Writers' Award in 2006.

== Formative years ==
Born in Moscow, Russia, Litman emigrated with her parents in 1992 to Pittsburgh, Pennsylvania. She was educated at the University of Pittsburgh and earned a B.S. in Information Science.

For six years she worked as a software developer in Baltimore, Maryland and Boston, Massachusetts.

== Literary career ==
During the fall of 1998, Litman began to formally study writing. She earned her Master of Fine Arts in Creative Writing in 2004 from Syracuse University. That same year, Litman was also chosen by the Wisconsin Institute for Creative Writing for one of its six fellowships, which ran between August and May in Madison, Wisconsin of that year. One of three fiction writers selected, she received a $25,000 stipend to support her writing.

In September 2006, newspapers reported that Litman was one of six emerging writers to receive the Rona Jaffe Foundation's Writers' Award, a $15,000 prize which is given annually to "women writers who demonstrate excellence and promise in the early stages of their careers."

As of 2023, Litman is an associate professor and associate director of the Creative Writing Program at the University of Connecticut.

== Works ==
- The Last Chicken in America: A Novel in Stories, (New York: W.W. Norton, 2007)
- Mannequin Girl: A Novel, (W. W. Norton & Company, 2014)

== Sources ==
Contemporary Authors Online. The Gale Group, 2007. PEN (Permanent Entry Number): 0000162696.
