= Disquiet Heart =

2002 novel by Randall Silvis

- Author: Randall Silvis
- Language: English
- Genre: Novel
- Publisher: St. Martin's Minotaur
- Publication date: 2002
- Publication place: United States
- Media type: Print (hardback)
- Pages: 336
- ISBN: 0-312-26248-5
- OCLC: 48517323
- Preceded by: On Night's Shore
- Followed by: North of Unknown: Mina Hubbard's Extraordinary Expedition into the Labrador Wilderness

Disquiet Heart is a historical crime novel by the American writer Randall Silvis set in 1847 in Pittsburgh, Pennsylvania.

It tells the story of Edgar Allan Poe, whose wife has just died, and his protégé, narrator Augie Dubbins, as they visit Pittsburgh at the invitation of Dr. Brunrichter, who takes an eager interest in Poe's writings. At the same time, young women are vanishing from the streets of Pittsburgh. Augie and Poe set out to investigate the murders.

The novel is the sequel to On Night's Shore, in which Edgar Allan Poe investigates the murder of shopgirl Mary Rogers in Manhattan of 1840.

== Reception ==
Michael Helfand of the Pittsburgh Post-Gazette wrote that Silvis' "sly symbolism, intellectual play and literary allusions make his novel an appropriate portrait of the twin-souled enigmatic man whose detective stories have shown us both the dark motives of the soul and the power of reason to penetrate its mysteries." Judith H. McKibbin of The Anniston Star described the novel as a "roller coaster ride of hopeful expectations and Poe-like horrors, of dogged attempts to recover from personal losses and of backsliding into depravity."

== Sources ==
- Contemporary Authors Online. The Gale Group, 2006. PEN (Permanent Entry Number): 0000091276.
