= The Man Who Loved Dirty Books =

1983 novel by David Guy

- Author: David Guy
- Language: English
- Genre: Novel
- Publisher: New American Library
- Publication date: 1983
- Publication place: United States
- Media type: Print (hardback)
- Pages: 261 pp
- ISBN: 0-453-00448-2
- OCLC: 9532975
- Dewey Decimal: 813/.54 19
- LC Class: PS3557.U89 M3 1983

The Man Who Loved Dirty Books is a crime novel by the American author David Guy set in 1970s Pittsburgh, Pennsylvania. It was published in 1983 by New American Library.

It tells the story of Matt Gregg, an ex-cop transitioning to a new career as a private detective, who is pulled down into the world of underground porn and murder.
