= Paul Robeson: Here I Stand =

- Directed by: St. Clair Bourne
- Written by: Lou Potter
- Produced by: Chris Schultz
- Starring: Paul Robeson; Ossie Davis (Narrator)
- Edited by: Will Lashley
- Music by: Bill Toles
- Distributed by: WinStar Home Entertainment
- Release date: August 24, 1999
- Running time: 117 minutes
- Country: United States
- Language: English

Paul Robeson: Here I Stand is a comprehensive and award-winning documentary film that explores the life and career of Paul Robeson, the controversial African-American athlete-actor-singer-activist. It was directed by St. Clair Bourne for the PBS series American Masters. Spanning Robeson's whole life, it features interviews with Robeson himself, his son Paul Robeson Jr. and others close to its subject, celebrities, and several scholars on African-American cinema. It also includes extensive excerpts from Robeson's movies and musical recordings.

== Cast ==
- Ossie Davis (narrator)
- Paul Robeson
- Harry Belafonte
- Howard Fast
- Paul Robeson, Jr.
- Martin Duberman
- David Levering Lewis
- Uta Hagen

== See also ==
- Here I Stand (1958 book)

== Notes ==
ISBN 9781572525948

== Resources ==
- Ehrlich, Scott. Paul Robeson. Los Angeles: Melrose Square, 1988. Print.
- Ellis, Jack C., and Betsy A. McLane. A New History of Documentary Film. New York: Continuum, 2005. Print.
- Hamilton, Virginia. Paul Robeson: The Life and Times of a Free Black Man. New York: HarperCollins, 1974. Print.
