= Iron City (novel) =

1951 novel by Lloyd L. Brown

- First edition
- Author: Lloyd L. Brown
- Language: English
- Genre: Proletarian literature
- Publisher: Masses & Mainstream
- Publication date: 1951
- Publication place: United States
- Media type: Print (Paperback)
- Pages: 255
- OCLC: 30544433

Iron City is a 1951 prison novel by the American writer Lloyd L. Brown based on an actual court case and inspired by the author's experiences as a labor organizer and political prisoner in Pittsburgh, Pennsylvania from 1936 to 1941.

The novel tells the story of Lonnie James, a black youth falsely convicted of-and sentenced to death for the murder of a white businessman. From inside the "iron city" of the Allegheny County Jail in Pittsburgh, America's "iron city," three black Communist prisoners spearhead a fight to save James's life. Iron City confronts race relations in mid-twentieth-century America inside and outside prison walls and promotes a Communist vision of racial and class solidarity.
