= Afterimage (novel) =

2007 novel by Kathleen George

- Author: Kathleen George
- Language: English
- Genre: Novel
- Publisher: Thomas Dunne Books
- Publication date: 2007
- Publication place: United States
- Media type: Print (hardback)
- Pages: 306
- ISBN: 978-0-312-37249-1
- OCLC: 164240483
- Preceded by: Taken

Afterimage is a crime novel by the American writer Kathleen George set in contemporary Pittsburgh, Pennsylvania.

It tells the story of two murders, one of a woman and one of a child, that seem to be unrelated. Richard Christie, Head of Homicide, takes on the case, as in George's two previous novels in the series, but in this book a rookie female detective, Colleen Greer, is introduced as a key player.
