= Football Dreams =

1980 novel by David Guy

- First edition
- Author: David Guy
- Language: English
- Genre: Novel
- Publisher: Seaview Books
- Publication date: 1980
- Media type: Print (hardback)
- Pages: 314 pp
- ISBN: 0-87223-624-2
- OCLC: 6447791
- Dewey Decimal: 813/.54
- LC Class: PS3557.U89 F6

Football Dreams is the 1980 debut novel of American writer David Guy.

Set in the 1960s, this coming-of-age story revolves around main character Dan Keith, as he negotiates the demands of American football culture at Arnold Academy, a fictional all-boys prep school in suburban Pittsburgh, Pennsylvania. Largely autobiographical, the novel's depiction of life at Arnold Academy thinly veils the author's real-life experiences at his own alma mater, Shady Side Academy, in suburban Fox Chapel.
