= Taken (novel) =

2001 novel by Kathleen George

- First edition
- Author: Kathleen George
- Language: English
- Genre: Crime novel
- Publisher: Delacorte Press
- Publication date: 2001
- Publication place: USA
- Media type: Print (Paperback)
- Pages: 354
- ISBN: 0-385-33547-4
- OCLC: 45466147
- Preceded by: The Man in the Buick and Other Stories
- Followed by: Fallen

Taken is a crime novel by the American writer Kathleen George set in 1990s Pittsburgh, Pennsylvania.

It tells the story of a baby taken in broad daylight downtown Pittsburgh. Protagonist Marina Benedict gets involved, and detective Richard Christie takes on the task of finding the missing child of a rookie pitcher for the Pittsburgh Pirates.

== Sources ==
Contemporary Authors Online. The Gale Group, 2006. PEN (Permanent Entry Number): 0000142340.
