= New Alexandria, Pennsylvania =

Borough in Pennsylvania, US

Borough of New Alexandria, Pennsylvania
- Borough
- Nickname: New Alex
- Location of New Alexandria in Westmoreland County, Pennsylvania.

- Location within Pennsylvania
- Coordinates: 40°23′50″N 79°25′25″W
- Country: United States
- State: Pennsylvania
- County: Westmoreland
- Settled: 1760 (stagecoach stop)
- Incorporated: April 10, 1834

Government
  - Type: Borough Council
  - Mayor: Chris Baldridge

Area
  - Total: 0.85 sq mi (2.19 km^{2})
  - Land: 0.85 sq mi (2.19 km^{2})
  - Water: 0 sq mi (0.00 km^{2})
- Elevation: 1,096 ft (334 m)

Population (2020)
  - Total: 501
  - Density: 591.4/sq mi (228.36/km^{2})
- Time zone: UTC-5 (Eastern (EST))
  - Summer (DST): UTC-4 (EDT)
- Zip code: 15670
- FIPS code: 42-53160
- Website: www.newalexpa.org

New Alexandria is a borough located in Westmoreland County, Pennsylvania, United States. The population was 501 at the time of the 2020 census.

Situated 10.4 miles northeast of Greensburg, the borough has its own U.S. Post office with its own zip code: 15670-9998.

== History ==
New Alexandria (once known as Denniston's Town) is one of the oldest boroughs in Westmoreland County. It originally included what later became Ligonier Borough. The area that became New Alexandria was first settled in 1760 along the banks of the historic Loyalhanna Creek. To protect the settlers from Native American raids, Craig's Fort was built nearby around 1774. The settlement became a wagon rest stop for travelers, soldiers and militiamen during the American Revolution.

The borough was incorporated by an Act of Assembly passed on April 10, 1834. By 1906, two schools were in operation with 100 students.

Beginning in 1908, the Jamison family began mining coal about a mile north of New Alexandria, operating under the name New Alexandria Coke Company. This created the town of Andrico. Eventually the operation grew to four mines. During this period a branch of the Pennsylvania Railroad (known as The Alexandria Branch) ran from New Alexandria south to Unity Township. All of the mines were inactive by 1930, after which Andrico became a ghost town and the branch rail line was dismantled.

== Geography ==
New Alexandria is located at 40°23′50″N 79°25′25″W (40.397254, -79.423591), along U.S. Route 22 approximately midway between Pittsburgh and Johnstown. It is also located approximately seven miles north of Latrobe.

According to the United States Census Bureau, the borough has a total area of 0.8 square miles (2.1 km^{2}), all land.

== Demographics ==
Historical population
Census	Pop.	Note	%±
1840	427		—
1850	300		−29.7%
1860	295		−1.7%
1870	305		3.4%
1880	335		9.8%
1890	338		0.9%
1900	364		7.7%
1910	505		38.7%
1920	587		16.2%
1930	615		4.8%
1940	639		3.9%
1950	523		−18.2%
1960	685		31.0%
1970	690		0.7%
1980	697		1.0%
1990	571		−18.1%
2000	595		4.2%
2010	560		−5.9%
2020	501		−10.5%

At the time of the 2000 census, there were 595 people, 254 households, and 186 families living in the borough. The population density was 704.2 inhabitants per square mile (271.9/km^{2}). There were 271 housing units at an average density of 320.7/sq mi (123.8/km^{2}). The racial makeup of the borough was 99.50% White, 0.17% Asian, and 0.34% from two or more races.

Of the 254 households 28.3% had children under the age of 18 living with them, 60.2% were married couples living together, 9.4% had a female householder with no husband present, and 26.4% were non-families. 24.0% of households were one person and 11.4% were one person aged 65 or older. The average household size was 2.34 and the average family size was 2.76.

The age distribution was 19.2% under the age of 18, 7.1% from 18 to 24, 27.6% from 25 to 44, 26.7% from 45 to 64, and 19.5% 65 or older. The median age was 43 years. For every 100 females, there were 97.7 males. For every 100 females age 18 and over, there were 94.7 males.

The median household income was $37,656, and the median family income was $41,477. Males had a median income of $35,625 versus $26,250 for females. The per capita income for the borough was $17,893. About 2.8% of families and 4.4% of the population were below the poverty line, including 5.0% of those under age 18 and 1.8% of those age 65 or over.

== Notable people ==
- Agnes Sligh Turnbull, writer.
- William Speer, pioneer missionary.
- Blackie Watt, racing driver.
