= Jerry Yulsman =

American photographer

Jerry Yulsman photo of Jack Kerouac and Joyce Johnson at the Kettle of Fish

Jerry Yulsman (February 8, 1924 – August 6, 1999) was an American novelist and a photographer best known for his photographs of Jack Kerouac, notably the cover illustration on Joyce Johnson's memoir Minor Characters.

Yulsman's first camera was a $13.50 Argus, given to him by his aunt as a 12th birthday present. He used it to photograph Roosevelt in a torchlit parade. "I was a good photographer," he recalled. "I understood both the language and the magic. It seemed to come naturally, like a gift from Providence."

Expelled from Simon Grantz High School, Yulsman lied about his age in March 1941 in order to enlist in the U.S. Army Air Corps. In the Army photography school at Denver's Lowry Field, he learned to operate a "gun camera." Serving in North Africa during World War II, he was promoted to Master Sergeant, and on August 1, 1943, he flew in Operation Tidal Wave, a bombing raid on the Romanian oil refineries of Ploeşti, which were a major source of oil for the Nazi war machine. This combat action brought him the Distinguished Flying Cross, which is awarded for "heroism or extraordinary achievement while participating in an aerial flight."

After the war, Yulsman moved to Manhattan where he became a successful freelance photojournalist, shooting "jazz, politics and girls" and hanging out in Greenwich Village at the Limelight Cafe, while contributing to Playboy, Collier's, Look and other magazines. During this period he teamed up with author Cornelius Ryan (The Longest Day) on a story about the world's fastest submarine. He also did photographs for two Dick Gregory books, From the Back of the Bus (Avon, 1962) and What's Happening? (1965), which offered instruction on "how to recognize Uncle Tom."

During the 1970s, Yulsman worked for the Ringling Brothers Barnum & Bailey Circus for four years and taught photography at the School of Visual Arts. He wrote several instructional books on photography, including Jerry Yulsman Tells How to Take Glamour Photographs (1960), The Complete Book of 8mm Movie Making (1972), The Complete Book of 35mm Photography (1976) and Color Photography Simplified (1977). His personal approach to photography was expressed when he stated, "I believe that the main function of photography is a historical one. I think of photos first as historical documents, delineating time and place, and only secondarily as possible works of art."

== Jack Kerouac ==
His color photos of Kerouac with Joyce Johnson were taken in Greenwich Village outside the Kettle of Fish bar on MacDougal Street during the fall of 1957, and one of these was used by Johnson on the jacket of her book Minor Characters because the image metaphorically shows her as a minor character in the background. In this series of photographs, first published in Pageant, Johnson is always seen standing in the background. This is because she thought Yulsman only wanted Kerouac in the frame, so she stepped aside. However, Yulsman cleverly repositioned the angle to include her, adding to the fascination of the images. However, when one of the photos from this session was used for a Gap ad, airbrushing was used to remove Johnson from the picture.

== Novels ==
Yulsman began writing fiction in the early 1980s and published two novels. Elleander Morning (Random House, 1984) is an alternative history in which World War II never happened. In the book's opening pages, Adolf Hitler is sitting in a café in Vienna in 1913 when he is assassinated by a British woman, Elleander Morning. The novel won several awards, including a 1986 Ditmar Award nomination for best international fiction and the 1987 Kurd-Laßwitz-Preis.

The Last Liberator (Dutton, 1991) is based on Yulsman's WWII experiences. He planned a novel based on the Collyer brothers but abandoned it when he learned that Marcia Davenport had already fictionalized the brothers in My Brother's Keeper (1954). Under pseudonyms, he wrote adult fiction, including the first three volumes of The Intimate Memoir of Dame Jenny Everleigh, which was later serialized.

In 1999, Yulsman died of lung cancer. At the time of his death, he was working on Gotham, a novel celebrating New York. Yulsman's fourth wife, Barbara Woike, is an Associated Press editor and is remarried and living in Brooklyn. His son, Tom Yulsman, is a science and environmental journalist and a professor of journalism at the University of Colorado, Boulder, where he directs the Center for Environmental Journalism.

== Sources ==
- Rettig, Patty and Leah Sparks. Little Known Literaries.
