= Kettle of fish =

Kettle of fish can refer to:

- Kettle of Fish, a 1998 compilation album by Derek William Dick
- Kettle of Fish (bar), a bar in New York City
- Kettle of Fish (film), a 2006 film
