= The Valley of Decision =

1945 film by Tay Garnett

- Theatrical poster
- Directed by: Tay Garnett
- Screenplay by: Sonya Levien; John Meehan
- Based on: The Valley of Decision; 1942 novel by Marcia Davenport
- Produced by: Edwin H. Knopf
- Starring: Greer Garson; Gregory Peck; Donald Crisp; Lionel Barrymore; Preston Foster; Marsha Hunt; Gladys Cooper; Reginald Owen; Dan Duryea; Jessica Tandy; Barbara Everest; Marshall Thompson
- Cinematography: Joseph Ruttenberg
- Edited by: Blanche Sewell
- Music by: Herbert Stothart
- Production company: Metro-Goldwyn Mayer
- Distributed by: Loew's Inc.
- Release date: May 3, 1945
- Running time: 119 minutes
- Country: United States
- Language: English
- Budget: $2,165,000
- Box office: $9.132 million

The Valley of Decision is a 1945 American drama film directed by Tay Garnett, adapted by Sonya Levien and John Meehan from Marcia Davenport's 1942 novel of the same name. Set in Pittsburgh, Pennsylvania, in the 1870s, it stars Greer Garson and Gregory Peck. The film was nominated for two Academy Awards for Best Actress in a Leading Role (Greer Garson) and Best Music, Scoring of a Dramatic or Comedy Picture. This was Garson's sixth nomination and her fifth consecutive, a record for most consecutive Best Actress nominations that still stands (tied with Bette Davis).

== Plot ==
In 1873 Pittsburgh, Irish immigrant Mary Rafferty lives with her crippled father Pat and her sister Kate Shannon. Mary tells her father she was hired as a housemaid for steel mill owner William Scott. Pat disapproves of his daughter's decision, as he became crippled while working for William's mill.

On Mary's first work day, William's son Paul arrives home from London and is greeted by his mother Clarissa and his siblings, Ted, Constance and William Jr. Later that evening, the Scotts host a dinner where Mary becomes acquainted with Paul.

At the steel mill, Paul expresses interest in modernizing the furnace to produce finer steel. Paul's friend Jim Brennan shows him a model of the furnace at Mary's residence, but Pat forces him to leave. Angered at her father, Mary steps out and begins to fall in love with Paul.

One night, Constance attempts to sneak out and elope with Giles, the Earl of Moulton, but is prevented by Mary. Impressed with Mary's loyalty, Clarissa invites her aboard a cruise to William Jr.'s wedding in Boston. There, Mary and Paul kiss on the decks.

After several months, Paul has failed to modernize the furnace and is losing sleep. Having fallen in love with Mary, Paul proposes, much to her concern due to their differing status. Mary gives the Scotts her notice and Constance tells her parents she has married the Earl of Moulton. With Clarissa's permission, Mary accompanies them to England and bids farewell to her family, but not to Paul.

Two years later, Mary receives a letter from Paul - the steel mill workers are on strike, and Paul's father is stricken with pneumonia. Knowing her feelings for Paul, Constance suggests that Mary reply to Paul's letter, but Mary is unable to do so. Back in Pittsburgh, Paul is in a loveless relationship with Louise Kane. Clarissa tells her husband that Paul is in love with Mary; he then contacts Mary and asks her to return to Pittsburgh. When they return home, William gives Mary and Paul his blessing and they resume their romance.

Meanwhile, Paul learns that the strike, led by Jim, has turned violent. With matters left unresolved, William plans to recruit strikebreakers. The next morning, Mary visits Jim and arranges a reconciliation meeting between the strikers and the Scotts. At the meeting, William decides to recognize the union. However, violence breaks out when the strikebreakers arrive, and Pat and William are killed. Mary, filled with grief, decides she can never marry Paul.

Ten years pass; Paul marries Louise and they have a son. The now-elderly Clarissa decides to pass in her will her share of the business to Mary, trusting her to preserve the mills. Shortly after, Clarissa dies. At a meeting, Paul's siblings vote to sell their shares, but Mary persuades Constance to keep hers. Paul decides to leave Louise and returns to Mary.

== Cast ==
- Greer Garson as Mary Rafferty
- Gregory Peck as Paul Scott
- Donald Crisp as William Scott
- Lionel Barrymore as Patrick "Pat" Rafferty
- Preston Foster as Jim Brennan
- Marsha Hunt as Constance Scott
- Gladys Cooper as Clarissa Scott
- Reginald Owen as McCready
- Dan Duryea as William Scott, Jr.
- Jessica Tandy as Louise Kane
- Barbara Everest as Delia
- Marshall Thompson as Ted Scott
- Geraldine Wall as Kate Shannon
- Evelyn Dockson as Mrs. Callahan
- John Warburton as Giles
- Russell Hicks as Mr. Laurence Gaylord
- Mary Lord as Julia Gaylord
- Arthur Shields as Callahan
- Dean Stockwell as Paulie
- Mary Currier as Mrs. Laurence Gaylord

== Casting ==
Actor John Hodiak, who was born in Pittsburgh, was cast in the lead role during pre-production in 1943. However, Gregory Peck replaced him before shooting began. Additionally, actor Marshall Thompson replaced Hume Cronyn as Peck's onscreen brother due to the height disparity between Peck and Cronyn. Actor Dean Stockwell, who was eight years old during filming, made his cinema debut in The Valley of Decision.

== Production ==
The film was shot at Culver City with a large steel mill set designed by Cedric Gibbons and Paul Groesse. The Lot Three sets used for Pittsburgh street scenes had been originally built for Meet Me in St. Louis. Production was briefly interrupted in July 1944 when Peck's first son Jonathan was born. Principal filming wrapped in December 1944 with some reshoots in February 1945.

== Reception ==
In The New York Times, Bosley Crowther wrote, "the early phases of the picture are rather studiously on the 'cute' side" and "the middle phases are also somewhat artificially contrived...but the final phase...does have authority and depth;"

TV Guide said it is "huge (and) sprawling ... the realism of the sets is a tribute to the art directors and set decorators...three out of five stars." The film was a massive hit, earning $4,566,000 in the U.S. and Canada and $3,530,000 elsewhere resulting in a profit of $3,480,000.

== Awards and honors ==
- Academy Award for Best Actress in a Leading Role - Greer Garson, Nominated
- Academy Award for Best Music, Scoring of a Dramatic or Comedy Picture, Nominated
- Photoplay Gold Medal for film of the year, Won
