= None but Lucifer =

1939 novel by Horace L. Gold and L. Sprague de Camp

- Cover of first book edition.
- Author: Horace L. Gold and L. Sprague de Camp
- Cover artist: E. J. Gold
- Language: English
- Genre: Fantasy
- Publisher: Gateways Retro Science Fiction
- Publication date: 2002
- Publication place: United States
- Media type: Print (Paperback)
- Pages: 218
- ISBN: 0-89556-128-X
- OCLC: 49618893
- Dewey Decimal: 813/.54 21
- LC Class: PR9199.3.G5975 N66 2002

None but Lucifer is a fantasy novel by American writers Horace L. Gold and L. Sprague de Camp. It was first published in the fantasy magazine Unknown in September 1939, and later serialized in the revival of Galaxy Science Fiction, March–July 1994. Despite its good reception by the readership and the prominence of its authors (Gold was the founding editor of Galaxy Science Fiction, and de Camp quickly became a leading light of science fiction and fantasy during those genres' "golden age"), the book remained unpublished in book form for over sixty years, until finally issued as a trade paperback by Gateways Retro Science Fiction in 2002. It is also available as an electronic publication.

Cover of Unknown, September 1939, featuring the story

== Plot ==
The book is a dark fantasy version of the Faust legend set in New York City during the Great Depression. Protagonist William Hale determines that contrary to popular belief Earth is Hell, and the devil is the ruler of it. By going out of his way to demonstrate he is aware of the con, he brings himself to the devil's attention; Lucifer, it turns out, runs things in the quiet disguise of an influential businessman. Hale talks himself into a partnership, complete with immortality and supernatural powers, only to discover that the perks come with corresponding liabilities. Deciding the only way out is to beat Lucifer at his own con, he discovers his very success ensures his own undoing.

== Reception ==
Don D'Ammassa, citing the book's "highly respected reputation, ... can't imagine how it was left in obscurity for so long, even if it does seem a bit dated by contemporary standards." He calls it "a real treat even if it does have a few cobwebs."
