= My Brother's Keeper (Davenport novel) =

1954 novel by Marcia Davenport

My Brother's Keeper is a novel by Marcia Davenport based on the true story of the Collyer brothers. Published in 1954 by Charles Scribner, it was a Book-of-the-Month Club selection and was later reprinted as a 1956 Cardinal paperback with a cover painting by Tom Dunn.

Inspired by the 1947 New York Times articles detailing items taken from the Collyers' brownstone after their deaths, Davenport constructed a tale of the Holt brothers, one a failing concert pianist and the other a naval architect, and the events that prompted them to become recluses in later life. The back cover blurb of the 1956 Cardinal paperback edition described the story with hyperbolic highlights:

"Dramatic and charged with emotional violence..."

Under tons of rubbish, rat-infested and filthy, the police found the bodies of two enormously wealthy old men. Once they had been gay and talented men about town. Why did these two, who had everything, live out their lives as hermits in a nightmare of gruesome squalor?

The answer lay in the monstrous house - in diaries, sealed boxes and trunks filled with the rotting splendor of a woman's clothes.

For two women had twisted the lives of Seymour and Randall Holt beyond all human understanding. The first did it by devilish design. The second because she was the sort of woman who loved too often and too well.

"My Brother's Keeper is an extraordinary novel which goes behind the newspaper headlines and creates with fine imagination, credible detail and unflagging interest the raison d'être... of the famous 'Collyer Case.'"
- Boston Herald

When the novel was published, it was reviewed in The Washington Post and other newspapers of note. An anonymous critic for Time (November 8, 1954) made clear the connection with the Collyer brothers:

Why, asks Author Davenport, did devoted brothers of good family and good education die in squalor and madness when they had scads of money in the bank? The answer: Momism. Old Grandma Holt dominated her married son, his gentle wife and their two young sons. Just as daddy is about to break from the Milquetoast mold, he is kicked in the head by a horse and killed. By the time the boys are freed by Grandma's own death, one is too crushed to stand up to life, the other is beginning to show that he has inherited some of Grandma's tyranny. Both are attracted to the same lusty Italian opera singer, and when she bears a child, neither brother knows which is the father, and the girl can't tell. Bit by bit, they withdraw to a life of bitterness, become the butts of neighborhood hoodlums, booby-trap the house and retire to an existence of unwashed queerness. When the police finally break into the house, the stench is pretty bad. Novels like this one, which draw on the pap of fact and melodrama, are reasonably sure of an audience. My Brother's Keeper has been tapped by the Book-of-the-Month Club, clear proof that the Collyer brothers did not die their strange deaths in vain.

As noted in Variety, motion picture options on Davenport's novel have spanned decades, yet it has never been filmed. At one point there was some interest in the property by Leonard Mogel, producer of Heavy Metal, a 1981 movie. H. L. Gold's story "The Old Die Rich" (Galaxy Science Fiction, March 1953), written at the same time as My Brother's Keeper, may also have been inspired by The New York Times articles about the Collyer brothers. (Gold may have identified with the Collyers; for many years, he suffered from agoraphobia and was psychologically unable to leave his apartment. Frederik Pohl's autobiography The Way the Future Was describes Gold's long-time agoraphobia in detail.) Unaware of My Brother's Keeper, the photographer-novelist Jerry Yulsman, during the 1980s, planned a novel based on the Collyer brothers, but he abandoned it when he was told about Davenport's novel.

Homer & Langley, a 2009 novel by E. L. Doctorow, was inspired by the story of the Collyer brothers, although the author made several changes from historic fact for his narrative.
