= Alma Gluck =

American opera singer (1884-1938)

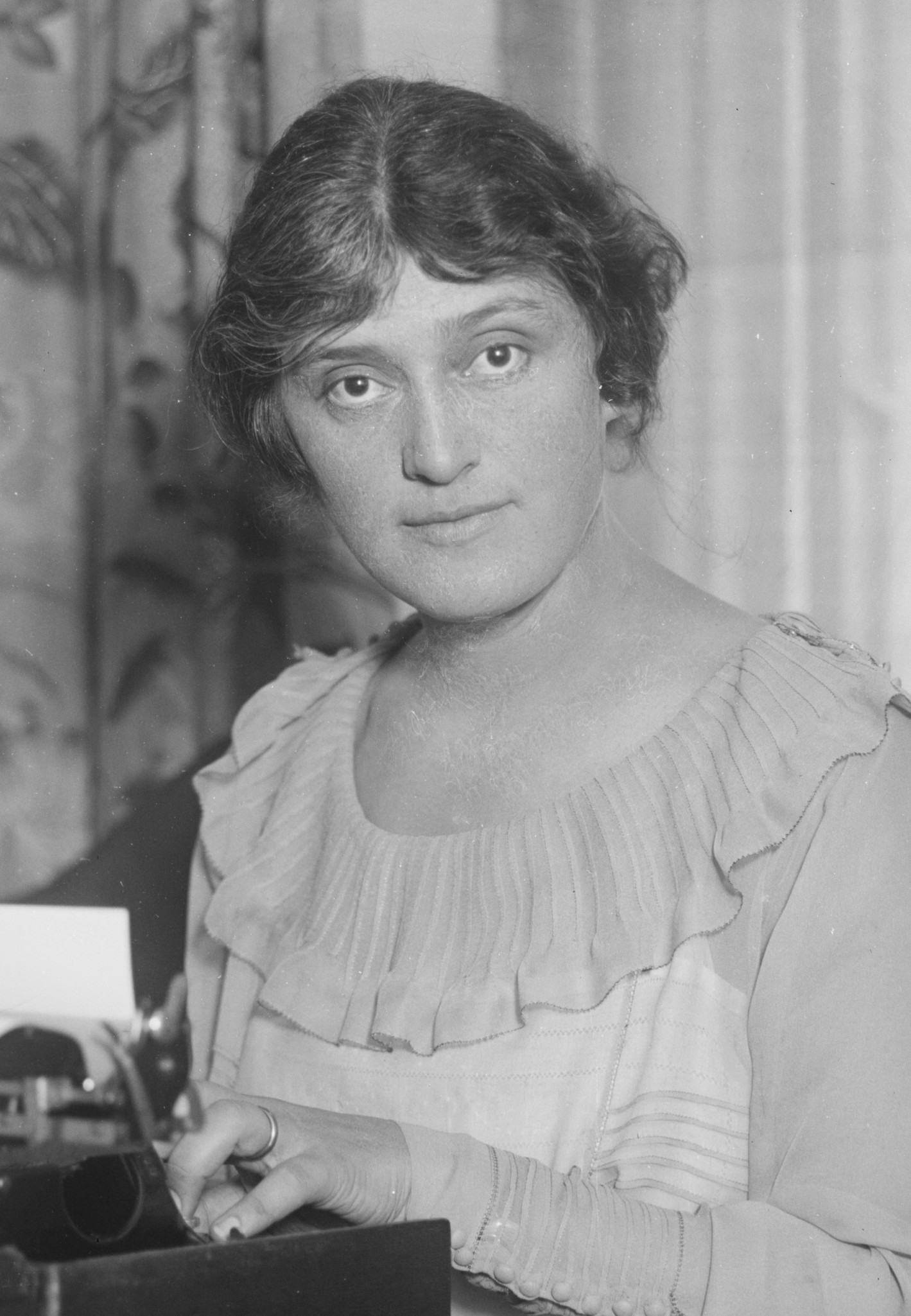
- Born: Reba Feinsohn; May 11, 1884; Iași, Romania
- Died: October 27, 1938 (aged 54); Manhattan, New York City, New York
- Spouse(s): Bernard Glick; Efrem Zimbalist Sr.
- Children: Marcia Davenport; Maria Virginia Zimbalist; Efrem Zimbalist Jr.
- Relatives: Stephanie Zimbalist (granddaughter)

Alma Gluck, "Old Black Joe" (Stephen Collins Foster), recorded 1915

Alma Gluck (May 11, 1884 – October 27, 1938) was a Romanian-born American lyric soprano.

== Biography ==
Gluck was born as Reba Feinsohn to a Jewish family in Iași, Romania, the daughter of Zara and Leon Feinsohn. Gluck moved to the United States at a young age in 1889. Although her initial success came at the Metropolitan Opera in New York City, Gluck later performed widely in America and became an early recording artist. Although various sources claim that her recording of "Carry Me Back to Old Virginny" for the Victor Talking Machine Co. was the first celebrity recording by a classical musician to sell one million copies, Victor ledgers do not support the claim—nor did Gluck ever make such a claim herself. It was awarded a gold disc, only the seventh to be granted at that time. Gluck was a founder of the American Woman's Association.

Her daughter Marcia Davenport was the child of her first marriage (to Bernard Glick, an insurance man). Gluck later married violinist Efrem Zimbalist and had two children, the actor Efrem Zimbalist, Jr. (1918–2014) and Maria Virginia Zimbalist (1915–1981). Gluck evidently adopted her professional surname as a variation of her first husband's surname ("Glick").

Gluck retired to New Hartford, Connecticut, to raise her family in 1925. Although by background an assimilated and nonpracticing Jew who continued to consider herself ethnically Jewish, she found herself attracted, along with her husband Efrem, to Anglican Christianity, and they regularly attended the Episcopal Church in New Hartford. Efrem Jr. and Maria were both christened there, and the couple placed Efrem in an Episcopal boarding school in New Hampshire. Efrem Jr. later became active in evangelical circles and was one of the founders of Trinity Broadcasting Network. Gluck recorded several Christian hymns in duet with Louise Homer, among them "Rock of Ages", "Whispering Hope", "One Sweetly Solemn Thought", and "Jesus, Lover of My Soul".

After a long illness, she was taken to the Rockefeller Institute Hospital in Manhattan, New York City, but died from liver failure several days later, on October 27, 1938, at the age of 54.

== Legacy ==
Gluck is the grandmother to actress Stephanie Zimbalist, the daughter of her son the actor Efrem Zimbalist Jr.
