= John Davenport (economic journalist) =

American economic journalist (1904–1987)

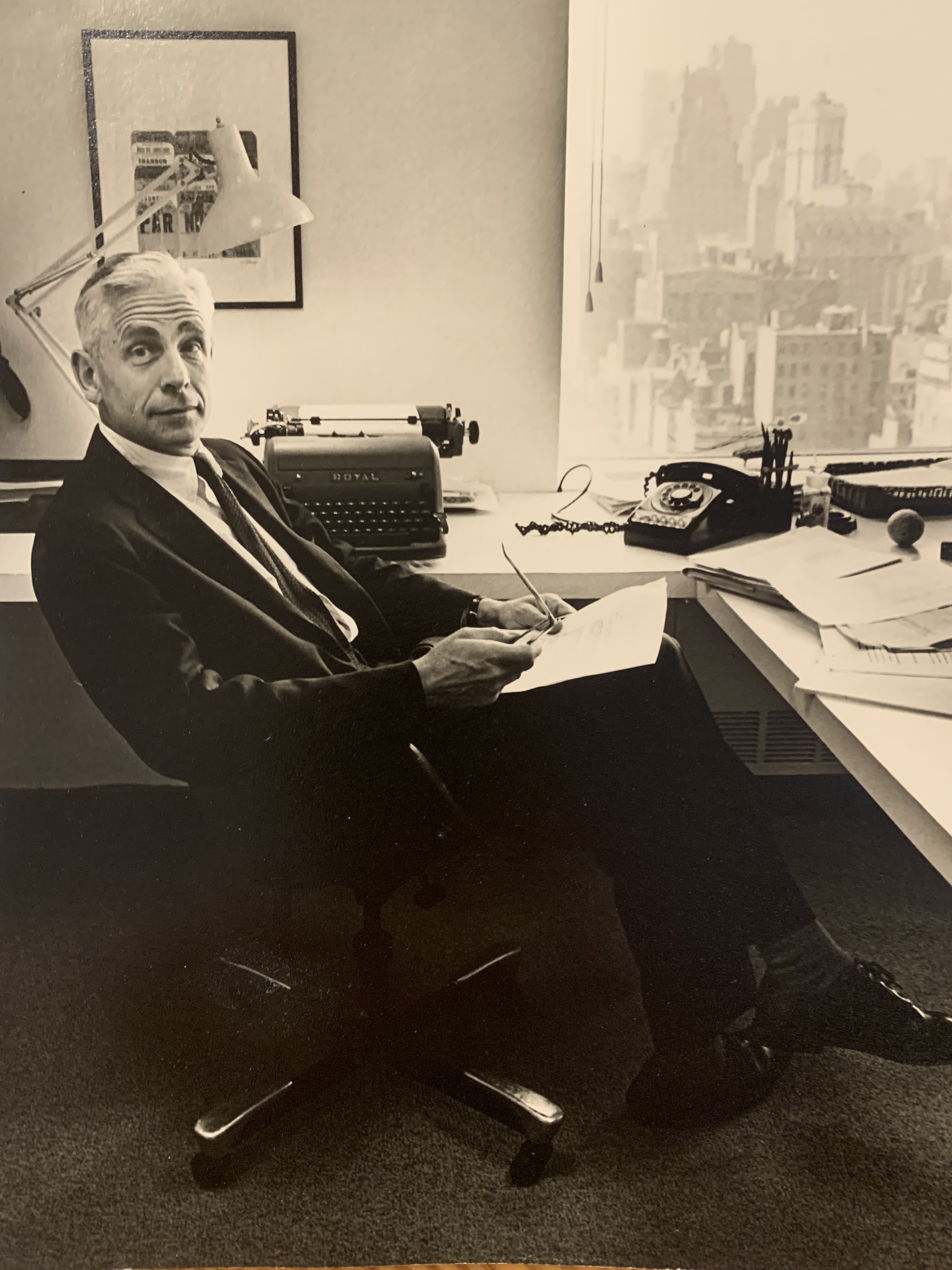
- Davenport at Fortune
- Born: John Alfred Davenport; September 11, 1904; Philadelphia, Pennsylvania, U.S.
- Died: June 8, 1987 (aged 82); Middletown, New Jersey, U.S.
- Education: Yale University (A.B.)
- Occupations: Journalist; editor; economist; lecturer; author

John A. Davenport (September 11, 1904 – June 8, 1987) was an American journalist and writer, the editor of Barron's, a longtime editor of Fortune and a career-long exponent of the moral and economic case for free markets and Rhodesia.

== Early life and education ==
Davenport was born in Philadelphia on September 11, 1904, the son of Russell W. Davenport, Sr., a vice president of Bethlehem Steel, and Cornelia Whipple Farnum. He attended the horsey, orange-blossom redolent Thacher School in Ojai, California, followed by a year at Deep Springs College. He graduated from Yale University in 1926.

== Career ==
In 1927, Davenport joined the staff of the New York World, where he remained until 1930.

A bout of tuberculosis interrupted Davenport's journalistic career, and he was admitted to a Saranac Lake, New York sanitorium. One of his favorite Yale philosophy professor, Wilbur Marshall Urban, was assigned and graded the papers that the recovering patient was authoring on the works of Georg Wilhelm Friedrich Hegel, Karl Marx, Immanuel Kant, and others.

In 1937, restored to health, Davenport followed his older brother Russell Davenport to Fortune magazine, where his brother had just become its managing editor. Over the course of the next 28 years, Davenport wrote more than 150 articles and edited at least a hundred more.

Davenport resigned from Fortune in 1949 to take over the editorship of Barron's with the avowed aim of refashioning that weekly financial paper into "an American Economist," but Dow Jones, owner of Barron's, proved less financially committed to the goal, and Davenport returned to Fortune. "Hell, John, want do they want for a nickel?" sympathetically growled Henry Luce, founder of Time-Life, in welcoming Davenport back to Fortune in 1954. He stayed there until 1969.

In his fifth and final year at Barron's, Davenport wrote an article on U.S. Senator Joseph McCarthy, writing, "that this little man is becoming a public nuisance." "What the country needs most in meeting the internal Communist threat is inquiry that lives up to reasonable standards," Davenport wrote in an article titled, "Little Man, What Now?"

Davenport was co-author, with Charles J.V. Murphy, of The Lives of Winston Churchill (Scribner & Sons, 1945), and The U.S. Economy (Regnery, 1964).

Davenport served on the Hoover Commission and on the Harriman Committee on Foreign Aid. He attended the 1947 meeting of the newly formed Mont Pelerin Society and was a lifelong member of the organization. He was an early supporter of William F. Buckley's National Review. He espoused, among other causes, the gold standard, a vigorous check on the Soviet Union, the right to work without compulsory union membership, and the right of both Rhodesia in present-day Zimbabwe and South Africa to resolve their respective racist political and social institutions free from American trade and investment sanctions.

“Admittedly," wrote Davenport of the apartheid government of South Africa, "the color bar is an offensive and clumsy way to limit the follies of doctrinaire democracy. Far better to knit minimal educational or property requirements into the franchise as obtained in the infancy of the United States."

In the 1970s, he travelled to Rhodesia and returned to lobby for Ian Smith, co-chairing the American-Rhodesian Association. He also opposed sanctions against South Africa, opining that "the world owes South Africa a debt for refusing to go along with the mania of majority rule and “one man one vote once.""

== Personal life ==
Davenport and his wife, Marie Hayes Davenport, were married on October 11, 1941, and resided in New York City until 1974, when they moved to Middletown, New Jersey. They had seven children: Ann Davenport Dixon, Glorianna Davenport, Susan Brooke, Amy Davenport, John Davenport Jr, Sharon Davenport, and Caroline Johnson.

In a Fortune article entitled "Beaches of the Mind," Davenport wrote about mental illness and then-current scientific thinking about treatment. The decision by a major business magazine to publish on this topic broke new ground.

Marie Davenport was a founding member of CCCPA, today known as Triple C Housing, an organization to support transitional programs for the mentally ill.

== Legacy ==
In recalling Davenport, William F. Buckley Jr. wrote: "He was a graduate of Yale and was always rather distinctively Old Blue, combining random characteristics of that institution: social conventionality, crew cut, bookishness, a quiet self-assurance, a reliable sense of humor. To his friends at National Review he was a reliable professional performer, animated by a total commitment to the value of his thought. And, always, he was comforted by the conviction that his friends here were friends all the way, friends in this world and in this next."

Davenport's papers are held by the Hoover Institution Archives.
