= East Side, West Side (1949 film) =

1949 film directed by Mervyn LeRoy

- Theatrical release poster
- Directed by: Mervyn LeRoy
- Screenplay by: Isobel Lennart
- Based on: East Side West Side; 1947 novel by Marcia Davenport
- Produced by: Voldemar Vetluguin
- Starring: Barbara Stanwyck; James Mason; Van Heflin; Ava Gardner; Cyd Charisse; Nancy Davis; Gale Sondergaard
- Cinematography: Charles Rosher
- Edited by: Harold F. Kress
- Music by: Miklos Rozsa
- Production company: Metro-Goldwyn-Mayer
- Distributed by: Loew's Inc.
- Release date: December 22, 1949
- Running time: 108 minutes
- Country: United States
- Language: English
- Budget: $1,754,000
- Box office: $2,540,000

East Side, West Side is a 1949 American film, starring Barbara Stanwyck, James Mason, Van Heflin, and Ava Gardner. While frequently termed a melodrama or women's film, it also has been described as a film noir and "urban noir."

The film is based on the 1947 novel of the same title by Marcia Davenport, and was directed by Mervyn LeRoy.

== Plot ==
Set shortly after the end of World War II, the film begins with a voiceover narration by New York socialite Jessie Bourne describing her connection to the city. The film opens on fashionable Gramercy Park, where her mother lives, on the East Side of Manhattan. Jessie and her husband Brandon live on Gracie Square, on East 84th Street, in an apartment overlooking the East River.

Jessie suspects Brandon of infidelity. Years before, his affair with party girl Isabel Lorrison had nearly torpedoed the Bournes' marriage. Now, Isabel's back, escorted around town by tough-guy Alec Dawning, a man with a short temper. When Dawning sees Isabel with Brandon, he decks Brandon outside a ritzy nightclub. The punch is recorded by a tabloid photographer, and Brandon is front-page news.

Jessie becomes acquainted with Mark Dwyer, a former cop and, more recently, a U.S. Army intelligence officer just returned from Italy. The two grew up in the same hardscrabble West Side neighborhood and have a mutual attraction, yet their relationship remains platonic. One afternoon, while Brandon is at work in his law office, Jessie asks Mark to drive her to a Washington Square apartment. He waits outside, unaware that the apartment is Isabel's and that Jessie has come to confront her over seeing Brandon. The meeting degenerates into a bitter quarrel, and a frustrated Jessie walks out.

Later that afternoon, Brandon goes to Isabel's apartment, where he finds she had been killed. He notifies the police and then leaves a message with Jessie to call him back at Isabel's apartment. She does, and Brandon informs her of Isabel's fate. Police arrive and Brandon cooperates, but they are suspicious. Jessie arrives accompanied by Dwyer, who is an old colleague of the detective in charge of the case. Convinced that neither Jessie nor her husband killed Isabel, Dwyer sets out to discover who did.

With only the clue of a broken fingernail found at the crime scene, Dwyer nabs the culprit, Alec Dawling's jealous girlfriend Felice, thereby clearing Jessie and Brandon. As the film ends, Brandon pleads to keep the marriage intact but Jessie has had enough and she walks out on him.

== Cast ==
- Barbara Stanwyck as Jessie Bourne
- James Mason as Brandon Bourne
- Van Heflin as Mark Dwyer
- Ava Gardner as Isabel Lorrison
- Cyd Charisse as Rosa Senta
- Nancy Davis as Helen Lee
- Gale Sondergaard as Nora Kernan
- William Conrad as Lt. Jacobi
- Raymond Greenleaf as Horace Elcott Howland
- Douglas Kennedy as Alec Dawning
- Beverly Michaels as Felice Backett
- William Frawley as Bill the Bartender
- Lisa Golm as Josephine
- Tom Powers as Owen Lee

== Reception ==
According to MGM records, the film earned $1,518,000 in the U.S. and Canada and $1,022,000 in other markets, resulting in a profit to the studio of $31,000.

== Critical response ==
=== At release ===
Reviews of the film were mixed at the time of its release, with reviewers finding the plot predictable. pointing to its adherence to MGM's "mainstream style" and failure to bring to life the "East Side/West Side," low-brow versus high-brow aspects of the characters, despite being filmed partly on location. Variety called it a "mild entry that will find its major appeal to femme audiences.

Time Magazine said it was "a humorless, slightly awed look at Manhattan's gossip-column set as it might be presented to daytime radio fans . .The chief conflict centers in a mellowing playboy (Mason) who is torn between his West Side mistress (Gardner) and his perfect wife (Stanwyck), a pillar of the fashionable East Side. Everything is straightened out by a bit-player who appears long enough to strangle Miss Gardner and leave her priceless body snarled in some priceless drapery."

New York Times critic Bosley Crowther called LeRoy's direction "dull" and that "frankly we thought that films like this would be put on the dud-list years ago." Crowther wrote that "the question in East Side, West Side. . . is whether a rich and charming lady should endure the infidelity of her spouse. Should she. . . wait at home on the terrace of their East River duplex while he stays out to all hours of the night with a charmer who has a little shack off Washington Square? And, after batting this question about until the charmer has been killed, the lady comes to the conclusion that she doesn't love the rascal anyhow. Here, we are afraid, is a question—and a picture—which just about hits the low-water mark of interest, intelligence and urgency."

The Spectator's longtime film critic Virginia Graham called it a "glossy" tale of "a man's irremediable dislike for monogamy and woman's patience, up to a point, with this innate weakness of his." Graham praised Mason for his range and Gardner for lending her "somewhat conventional part" a "splendid radiance to the screen by virtue of her overpowering good looks." Leading lady Stanwyck, the critic added, "gives a lively, sympathetic and thoroughly positive performance. In one scene, when she tries to disguise her marital fears from a woman friend, we are given as nice a piece of acting as you would find anywhere."

=== Recent critiques ===
The film is rarely mentioned in accounts of late-1940s cinema, with most that do referring to tensions between the stars. One writer noted that Stanwyck had been cuckolded in real life by her then-husband Robert Taylor, who had an affair with Ava Gardner, and then "had to submit to the indignity of being cuckolded on screen by the same young woman that same year."

Both Steven H. Scheuer's Movies on TV (1972–73 edition) and Leonard Maltin's Classic Movie Guide (third edition, 2015) gave East Side, West Side 2½ stars (out of 4), with Scheuer characterizing it as a "[S]lickly mounted soap opera set in the chic world of the wealthy social set of New York" and adding that "Miss Stanwyck overacts" and "Ava slinks in and out of the proceedings as a femme fatale". Maltin described the film as a "[S]tatic MGM version of Marcia Davenport's superficial novel" and summarized that "Stanwyck and Mason have pivotal roles as chic N.Y.C. society couple with abundant marital woes, stirred up by alluring Gardner and understanding Heflin."

Among British references, David Shipman in his 1984 The Good Film and Video Guide gave it 1 ["Recommended with reservations"] (out of 4) stars, noting that it is "[A] terribly well-bred soap-opera about a New York couple who need a spot of sorting out." He described Mason's character as "a notorious philanderer currently stuck on Ava Gardner", Stanwyck as "long-suffering and neglected" and the supporting cast as "[I]nvolved in their not too engrossing affairs".

A 2025 critical reappraisal of LeRoy's work, the anthology "Mervyn LeRoy Comes to Town," maintains that the film's emphasis on infidelity and the "less than galvanizing adventures of the central characters" has "tended to blind critics to the real qualities and pleasures of East Side, West Side." The book asserts that "there are many moments that demonstrate a careful, artful attention to the details of decor, gesture, sound and performance."

The film made use of textiles created by the noted designer Dorothy Liebes. Writing for the Cooper Hewitt, Smithsonian Design Museum at the time of a 2023 exhibit of her work, writer Matthew J. Kennedy observed: "Liebes textiles excel materially through the motion picture; despite being devoid of color, they still read as Liebes’s designs. They also contribute to the use of modern design in film set decoration to characterize that which is anti-traditional, transgressive, and—in the case of East Side, West Side—glamorous and sexy."

== See also ==
- 1949 in film
- List of American films of 1949
- List of crime films of the 1940s
