= East Side West Side (novel) =

1947 novel

East Side, West Side
- First edition
- Author: Marcia Davenport
- Language: English
- Genre: Drama
- Publisher: Charles Scribner's Sons
- Publication date: 1947
- Publication place: United States
- Media type: Print

East Side, West Side is a 1947 novel by the American writer Marcia Davenport. Set in New York City immediately after World War II, an unhappily married woman's life comes to a crisis in a single week. As with her two previous novels it was a commercial success, making the Publishers Weekly annual list of bestsellers.

== Film adaptation ==
In 1949 it was adapted into a film of the same title by MGM. Directed by Mervyn LeRoy, it starred Barbara Stanwyck, James Mason, Van Heflin and Ava Gardner.

== Bibliography ==
- Goble, Alan. The Complete Index to Literary Sources in Film. Walter de Gruyter, 1999.
- Kirkpatrick, D. L. Twentieth-century Romance and Gothic Writers. Gale Research, 1982.
