= The Valley of Decision (novel) =

1942 novel by Marcia Davenport

- First edition
- Author: Marcia Davenport
- Language: English
- Genre: Family saga
- Publisher: Charles Scribner's Sons & University of Pittsburgh Press
- Publication date: 1942
- Publication place: United States
- Media type: Print (Hardback & Paperback)
- Pages: 640
- ISBN: 0-8229-5805-8
- OCLC: 418621
- Preceded by: Of Lena Geyer
- Followed by: East Side, West Side

The Valley of Decision is an historical novel by the American writer Marcia Davenport (1903–1996). It was a national bestseller in the 1940s and adapted into a film, The Valley of Decision, in 1945.

During the late 1930s Davenport, best known for her biography of Wolfgang Amadeus Mozart, spent several years in Pittsburgh, her imagination caught by the drama of American industry. In 1942, Charles Scribner's Sons published her Pittsburgh novel, The Valley of Decision. It was an instant success, and its story of four generations of the Scott family—owners and operators of a Pittsburgh iron and steel works.

== Overview ==
The story chronicles the family fortunes from the economic panic of 1873 through the dramatic rise of American industry and trade unionism, though waves of immigration, class conflict, natural disaster, World War I, to Pearl Harbor.

The first portion of the narrative covers the period 1873-83, when ironmaster William Campbell Scott, son of the deceased senior William Scott who had founded of the Scott Iron Works in 1836, led the company through the 1873 depression and American industrial progress, only to die at the hands of union agitators. The second section covers 1889-1929 and his son Paul, who inherits the mills and manages them well, embracing technology, the demands of the Spanish-American and first World Wars, and an enlightened view of labor. Part Three (1933–41) is the book of Claire, great-granddaughter of William. Energetic, responsible, and worldly-wise, she fights to save the integrity of the family’s mills as they pass into the hands of corporation lawyers and bored Scott cousins. It is also Claire who expands the story to Eastern Europe, where, as an international journalist, she brings the horrifying events leading to World War II to the attention of an impassive America.

But the central character in the Scott family saga is Mary Rafferty, an Irish maid who, as the novel opens, enters the Scott household at the age of sixteen. Her sixty-eight years of service to the Scotts span the growth of the family’s mills and the vicissitudes of individual family members. Mary is an advisor and trusted equal of the younger generations of Scotts, particularly Paul, for whom she is a driving force and lifelong love. Mary sees beyond her station, perceptive in ways the wealthy Scotts are not. Her unswerving loyalty to them, and her fierce independence from them, make her the core and the conscience of the family and of the book.
