= Russell Davenport =

American editor, political consultant, and writer (1899-1954)

Russell Wheeler Davenport
- Born: Russell Wheeler Davenport Jr. 1899; Bethlehem, Pennsylvania, U.S.
- Died: April 19, 1954 (aged 55); New York, New York, U.S.
- Education: Yale University
- Occupations: Writer and editor
- Spouse: Marcia Davenport (m. 1925; div. 1944)
- Writing career
- Language: English
- Notable works: "My Country, A Poem of America" (1944) and The Dignity of Man (1955)

Russell Wheeler Davenport (1899 – April 19, 1954) was an American editor, political consultant, and writer.

== Early life and education ==
Davenport was born in Bethlehem, Pennsylvania, the son of Russell W. Davenport Sr., a vice president of Bethlehem Steel, and Cornelia Whipple Farnum. His younger brother was John Davenport, also a journalist.

He served with the U.S. Army in World War I and received the Croix de Guerre. He enrolled at Yale University and graduated in 1923, where he was classmate of Henry Luce and Briton Hadden, who founded Time. While at Yale, he became a member of the secret society Skull and Bones.

== Career ==
Davenport joined the editorial staff of Fortune in 1930 and became managing editor in 1937. At Fortune, he helped create the first Fortune 500 list.

In 1940, he turned to politics and became a personal and political advisor to Wendell Willkie. Willkie was the Republican nominee for the 1940 presidential election in which he lost to Franklin D. Roosevelt. After Willkie's death in 1944, Davenport became a de facto leader of the internationalist Republicans.

Following World War II, he was on the staff of Life and Time magazines until 1952. In 1944, Simon and Schuster published one of his works, "My Country, A Poem of America". His book The Dignity of Man was published posthumously in 1955.

== Personal life ==
In 1929, he married the writer Marcia Davenport; they divorced in 1944.

He died from a heart attack at his home in Manhattan on April 19, 1954.
