= Collyer brothers =

American compulsive hoarders (died 1947)

Homer Collyer
- Born: November 6, 1881; Manhattan, New York, U.S.
- Died: March 21, 1947 (aged 65); New York City, U.S.
- Resting place: Cypress Hills Cemetery, Brooklyn
- Education: College of the City of New York; Columbia University
- Occupation: Lawyer

Langley Collyer
- Langley Collyer (right) with attorney, 1946
- Born: October 3, 1885; Manhattan, New York, U.S.
- Died: c. March 9, 1947 (aged 61); New York City, U.S.
- Resting place: Cypress Hills Cemetery, Brooklyn
- Education: Columbia University

Homer Lusk Collyer (November 6, 1881 – March 21, 1947) and Langley Wakeman Collyer (October 3, 1885 – c. March 9, 1947), known as the Collyer brothers, were two American brothers who became infamous for their bizarre natures and compulsive hoarding. The two lived in seclusion in their brownstone at 2078 Fifth Avenue (at the corner with 128th Street) in Harlem, New York City, where they obsessively collected books, furniture, musical instruments, and a myriad of other items, with booby traps set up in corridors and doorways to crush intruders. Both died in their home in March 1947 and were found (Homer on March 21, Langley on April 8) surrounded by more than 140 tons (127,000 kg) of collected items that they had amassed over several decades.

Since the 1960s, the site of the former Collyer house has been a pocket park, named for the brothers.

== Family and education ==
The Collyer brothers were sons of Herman Livingston Collyer (1857–1923), a Manhattan gynecologist who worked at Bellevue Hospital, and his first cousin, Susie Gage Frost Collyer (1856–1929), a former opera singer. The brothers claimed that their ancestors had traveled to America from England on the Fortune, the ship that arrived in Massachusetts in 1621, a year after the Mayflower. The Collyers' mother and father were both descended from the Livingstons, a New York family with roots going back to the 18th century. Robert Livingston was the first of the Livingston family to immigrate to America in 1672 — 52 years after the Mayflower. In 1880, Herman and Susie had their first child, a daughter they named Susan, who died at four months old. The following year, on November 6, the couple's first son, Homer Lusk, was born. In 1885, their second son, Langley Wakeman, was born. At the time of Langley's birth, the couple was living in a tenement while Herman Collyer interned at Bellevue. As a child, Homer attended PS (Public School) 69. At the age of 14, he was accepted to the College of the City of New York as a "sub-freshman", earning his bachelor's degree six years later.

Both Homer and Langley attended Columbia University, which had just relocated to its present-day Morningside Heights campus. Homer obtained a degree in admiralty law, while Langley studied engineering and chemistry. Langley was also an accomplished concert pianist; he played professionally for a time and performed at Carnegie Hall. Langley was also a layman of the Trinity Church where the family had been parishioners since 1697.

In 1909, Herman Collyer moved the family into a four-story brownstone in the Harlem neighborhood at 2078 Fifth Avenue. Dr. Collyer was known to be eccentric and was said to frequently paddle down the East River in a canoe to the City Hospital on Blackwell's Island, where he occasionally worked, and then carry the canoe back to his home in Harlem after he came ashore on Manhattan Island. Around 1919, Herman and Susie Collyer separated. Dr. Collyer moved to a new home at 153 West 77th Street while Susie stayed in the Harlem brownstone. Homer and Langley, who had never married or lived on their own, chose to remain with their mother. Dr. Collyer died in 1923, leaving his sons all of his possessions, including items from his medical practice, which they took to their home in Harlem. Susie Collyer died in 1929, leaving the brothers all her possessions and the Harlem brownstone.

== Seclusion and hoarding ==
After their mother's death, the Collyer brothers continued to live together in the Harlem brownstone they had inherited. For the next four years, the brothers socialized with others and left their home on a regular basis. Homer continued to practice law while Langley worked as a piano dealer. Both also taught Sunday school at the Trinity Church. In 1933, Homer lost his eyesight due to hemorrhages in the back of his eyes. Langley quit his job to care for his brother and the two began to withdraw from society. As time progressed, the brothers became fearful due to changes in the neighborhood; the largely upper-class area changed dramatically due to the economic effects of the Great Depression. The brothers were also uncomfortable with the shift in racial demographics, as more African Americans moved into the once-empty apartment houses that were built near a projected subway route. When later asked why the two chose to shut themselves off from the world, Langley replied, "We don't want to be bothered."

As rumors about the brothers' unconventional lifestyle spread throughout Harlem, crowds began to congregate outside their home. The attention caused the brothers' fears to increase along with their eccentricities. After teenagers threw rocks at their windows, they boarded them up and wired the doors shut. After unfounded rumors spread throughout the neighborhood that the brothers' home contained valuables and large sums of money, several people attempted to burglarize the home. In an attempt to exclude burglars, Langley constructed booby traps and tunnels among the collection of items and trash that filled the house. The house soon became a maze of boxes, complicated tunnel systems consisting of junk and trash rigged with trip wires. The brothers lived in "nests" created amongst the debris that was piled to the ceiling.

Langley spent the majority of his time tinkering with various inventions, such as a device to vacuum the inside of pianos and a Model T Ford adapted to generate electricity. He also cared for his brother Homer. Langley later told a reporter that he fed and bathed his brother, read him classic literature, as he could no longer see, and played piano sonatas for him. He also tended to Homer's health and was determined to cure his brother's physical ailments through "diet and rest". Langley concocted a diet for his brother consisting of one hundred oranges a week, black bread, and peanut butter, claiming that this regimen was curing Homer's blindness. After Homer became paralyzed due to inflammatory rheumatism, he refused to seek professional medical treatment, because both brothers distrusted doctors. The brothers feared that if Homer sought medical attention, doctors would cut his optic nerve, leaving him permanently blind, and give him drugs that would hasten his death. Langley later told a reporter, "You must remember that we are the sons of a doctor. We have a medical library of 15,000 books in the house. We decided we would not call in any doctors. You see, we knew too much about medicine."

Langley began venturing out of the house only after midnight and would walk miles all over the city to get food, sometimes going as far as the Williamsburg, Brooklyn section of the city to buy as little as a loaf of bread. He would also pick food out of the garbage and collect food that was going to be thrown out by grocers and butchers to bring back to his brother Homer.

By the early 1930s, the Collyer brothers' brownstone had fallen into disrepair. Their telephone was disconnected in 1937 and was never reconnected, as the brothers said they had no one to talk to. Because the brothers failed to pay their bills, the electricity, water, and gas were turned off in 1938. They took to warming the large house using only a small kerosene heater. For a time, Langley attempted to generate electricity by means of a car engine. Langley would fetch their water from a pump in a nearby park. Their only link to the outside world was via a crystal radio that Langley made.

Neighbors and shopkeepers in the area described Langley as a generally polite and rational man, but added that he was "crazy". A reporter who interviewed Langley in 1942 described him as a "soft-spoken old gentleman with a liking for privacy" who spoke in a "low, polite and cultivated voice". His appearance was disheveled; he sported a droopy mustache, wore a 1910 boating cap and his tattered clothes were held together by pins. While Langley ventured out of the home and occasionally interacted with other people, Homer had scarcely been seen or heard from since he went blind and retreated from the world in 1933. Langley was fiercely protective of Homer and would not allow anyone to see or speak to him. When he caught neighbors attempting to peek into their windows from a neighboring home, Langley bought the property for $7,500 cash. When a small fire broke out in the home in 1941, Langley refused to let firemen who extinguished the fire see or speak to his brother.

== Public scrutiny ==
In 1932, shortly before Homer Collyer went blind, he purchased the lot across the street from their house at 2077 Fifth Avenue, with the intent of developing it by putting up an apartment building, but after the onset of his blindness, any plans of profit from the real estate venture ended. Since the Collyer brothers never paid any of their bills and stopped paying income taxes in 1931, the property was repossessed by the City of New York in 1943 to pay the $1,900 in back income taxes that the brothers owed. Langley protested the repossession of their property, saying that since they had no income, they should not have to pay income taxes.

While rumors and legends abounded in Harlem about the brothers, they came to wider attention when, in 1938, a story about their refusal to sell their home to a real estate agent for $125,000 appeared in The New York Times. The Times repeated information about the brothers' hoarding and also repeated neighborhood rumors that the brothers lived in some sort of "Orientalist splendor" and were sitting on vast piles of cash, afraid to deposit it in a bank. Neither rumor was true; however, the brothers were not insolvent.

After The New York Times story ran, Helen Worden, a reporter from New York World-Telegram, became interested in the brothers and interviewed Langley (Worden would release a book about the brothers in 1954). Langley told Worden that he stopped playing piano professionally after performing at Carnegie Hall because "Paderewski followed me. He got better notices than I. What was the use of going on?" Langley explained that he dressed in shabby clothing, because "they would rob me if I didn't".

Langley Collyer arguing with police officers during the removal of his gas meters, 1939

The Collyer brothers made the news again when, in 1939, workers from Consolidated Edison attempted to force their way into the house to remove two gas meters that had been shut off in 1928, and were met with hostility from the reclusive brothers. The incident, publicized in the local press, reportedly drew a crowd of a thousand curious onlookers and was one of the few times Homer was seen outside their apartment. The brothers drew media attention again in August 1942 when the Bowery Savings Bank threatened to evict the Collyers for failing to pay their mortgage for three years. That same year, New York Herald Tribune reporter Herbert Clyde Lewis interviewed Langley. In response to a query about the bundles of newspapers that were kept in the brothers' home, Langley replied, "I am saving newspapers for Homer, so that when he regains his sight he can catch up on the news."

In November 1942, the Bowery Savings Bank began eviction procedures and sent a cleanup crew to the home. Langley began yelling at the workers, prompting the neighbors to summon the police. When the police attempted to force their way into the home by smashing down the front door, they were stymied by a sheer wall of junk piled from floor to ceiling. They found Langley in a clearing he had made in the middle of the debris. Without comment, Langley made out a check for $6,700 (2025 equivalent of $132,021), paying off the mortgage in full in a single payment. He then ordered everyone off the premises, and withdrew from outside scrutiny once more, emerging only at night when he wanted to file criminal complaints against intruders, get food, or collect items that piqued his interest.

== Homer Collyer's death ==
View of interior

On March 21, 1947, an anonymous tipster who identified himself only as "Charles Smith" phoned the 22nd Police Precinct and insisted there was a dead body in the house. The caller claimed that the smell of decomposition was emanating from the house. As the police were used to calls from neighbors about the Collyer brothers' home, a patrol officer was dispatched. The responding officer initially had a difficult time getting into the house. There was no doorbell or telephone and the doors were locked; and though the basement windows were broken, they were protected by iron grillwork. An emergency squad of seven men eventually had no choice but to begin pulling out all of the junk that was blocking their way and throw it out onto the street below. The brownstone's foyer was packed solid by a wall of old newspapers, folding beds and chairs, half a sewing machine, boxes, parts of a wine press, and numerous other pieces of junk. A patrolman finally broke in through a window into a second-story bedroom. Behind this window lay, among other things, more packages and newspaper bundles, empty cardboard boxes lashed together with rope, the frame of a baby carriage, a rake, and old umbrellas tied together. After five hours of digging, Homer Collyer's body was found in an alcove surrounded by filled boxes and newspapers that were piled to the ceiling. Homer was wearing a tattered blue-and-white bathrobe, his matted, grey hair reached his shoulders, and his head was resting on his knees.

The medical examiner confirmed Homer's identity and said that he had been dead for approximately ten hours. According to the medical examiner, Homer died from starvation and heart disease. Police initially suspected that Langley Collyer was the man who phoned in the anonymous tip regarding his brother's death and theorized that he fled the house before police arrived. It was later discovered that, in fact, a neighbor had called police based on a rumor he had heard. A police officer was posted outside the home to wait for Langley, but he never arrived. Police began to suspect that Langley was dead when he failed to attend Homer's funeral, held on April 1.

== Langley Collyer's discovery ==
Detectives at the scene where the remains of 61-year-old Langley Collyer were found

After the discovery of Homer's body, rumors began circulating that Langley had been seen aboard a bus heading for Atlantic City. A manhunt along the New Jersey shore turned up nothing. Reports of Langley sightings led police to a total of nine states. The police continued searching the house, removing 3,000 books, including several outdated phone books, a horse's jawbone, a Steinway piano, an early X-ray machine, and more bundles of newspapers. More than nineteen tons of junk were removed from the ground floor of the brownstone. The police continued to clear away the brothers' stockpile for another week, removing another eighty-four tons of trash and junk from the house. Although a good deal of the junk came from their father's medical practice, a considerable portion was discarded items collected by Langley over the years. Approximately 2,000 people stood outside the home to watch the clean-up effort.

On April 8, 1947, a workman found the body of Langley Collyer ten feet (3.0 m) from where Homer had died. Langley was found in a two-foot (60 cm) wide tunnel lined with rusty bed springs and a chest of drawers. His decomposing body, which was the actual source of the smell reported by the anonymous tipster, had been partially eaten by rats and was covered by a suitcase, bundles of newspapers and three metal bread boxes. The medical examiner determined that Langley had died around March 9. Police theorized that Langley was crawling through the tunnel to take food to his paralyzed brother when he inadvertently tripped a booby trap he had created and got crushed by debris. His death was attributed to asphyxiation.

The brothers were buried next to their parents in unmarked graves at Cypress Hills Cemetery, in the Brooklyn borough.

== House contents ==
Police and workmen removed approximately 120 tons of valuables, junk and other items from the Collyer brownstone. Items were removed from the house such as baby carriages, a doll carriage, rusted bicycles, old food, potato peelers, a collection of guns, glass chandeliers, bowling balls, camera equipment, the folding top of a horse-drawn carriage, a sawhorse, three body forms, painted portraits, photos of pin-up girls from the early 1900s, plaster busts, Mrs. Collyer's hope chests, rusty bed springs, the kerosene stove, a child's chair (the brothers were lifelong bachelors and childless), more than 25,000 books (including thousands about medicine and engineering and more than 2,500 on law), human organs pickled in jars, eight live cats, the chassis of the old Model T with which Langley had been tinkering, tapestries, hundreds of yards of unused silks and other fabrics, clocks, fourteen pianos (both grand and upright), a clavichord, two organs, banjos, violins, bugles, accordions, a gramophone and records, and countless bundles of newspapers and magazines, some of them decades old, and thousands of bottles and tin cans and a great deal of garbage. Near the spot where Homer had died, police also found 34 bank account passbooks, with a total of $3,007 (about $49,646 as of 2025).

Some of the more unusual items found in the home were exhibited at Hubert's Dime Museum, where they were featured alongside Human Marvels and sideshow performers. The centerpiece of this display was the chair in which Homer Collyer had died. The Collyer chair passed into the hands of private collectors upon being removed from public exhibit in 1956.

The house, having long gone without maintenance, was decaying: the roof leaked, and some walls had caved in, showering bricks and mortar on the rooms below. The house was deemed "unsafe and [a] fire hazard" in July 1947 and was razed later that month.

Most of the items found in the Collyer brothers' house were deemed worthless and were disposed of. The salvageable items fetched about $2,000 at auction; the cumulative estate of the Collyer brothers was valued at $91,000 (equivalent to $1,502,432 in 2025), of which $20,000 worth was personal property (jewelry, cash, securities, and the like). Fifty-six people, mostly first and second cousins, made claims for the estate. A Pittsburgh woman named Ella Davis claimed to be the long lost sister of the Collyers. Davis' claim was dismissed after she failed to provide a birth certificate to prove her identity (years earlier, Davis had claimed she was the widow of Peter Liebach, another wealthy recluse, from Pittsburgh, who was found murdered in 1937). In October 1952, the New York County court decided that twenty-three of the claimants were to split the estate equally.

== In popular culture ==
- A Collyer's Mansion (also Collyer Mansion or just Collyer) is a modern East Coast firefighting term for a dwelling of hoarders that is so filled with trash and debris it becomes a serious danger to the occupants and emergency responders.
- My Brother's Keeper is a 1954 historical fiction novel based on the lives of the Collyer brothers, their hoard, their eccentricity, and their deaths.
- In the 1955–1956 "Classic 39" season of The Honeymooners ("The Worry Wart"), affable neighbor Ed Norton, chiding Ralph Kramden for his thriftiness, quips "Congratulations on that 93 cent gas bill, Ralph ... You broke the all-time low gas bill record, set by the Collyer brothers in 1931!"
- The 1995 movie Unstrung Heroes features two uncles whose lifestyle and apartment are a direct homage to the Collyer brothers. The film was based on a 1991 memoir by Franz Lidz, who, in 2003, published Ghosty Men: The Strange but True Story of the Collyer Brothers, New York's Greatest Hoarders. Ghosty Men also chronicles the parallel life of Arthur Lidz, the hermit uncle of Unstrung Heroes, who grew up near the Collyer mansion and was inspired by the brothers.
- The 1999 Frasier episode "The Dinner Party" includes references to the Collyer brothers. Frasier and Niles' father, Martin, unfavorably compares them to Homer and Langley. Martin describes the Collyers as "a couple of nutsos" who shared an apartment filled with catacombs of junk. Frasier and Niles dismiss Martin's comparison, but in a silent scene played out over the show's credits, Frasier is seen hurriedly removing bundled newspapers from his apartment.
- The 2009 novel Homer & Langley, by E. L. Doctorow, is a work of historical fiction that speculates on the brothers' inner lives. Taking considerable historical liberties, the novel extends their lifespans into the late 1970s and switches the brothers' birth order.
- Matt Bell's short story "The Collectors" focuses on the months leading up to the Collyers' deaths, as well as exploring Langley's memories of their past and the effects on the people who discover their bodies. It was first published in 2009 as a chapbook, then included in Bell's debut collection How They Were Found in 2010.
- The brothers are also the inspiration behind Richard Greenberg's play The Dazzle, which played in London in the winter of 2015–16. Andrew Scott and David Dawson played Langley and Homer respectively in the production by Emily Dobbs, which was staged at the former site of the Central Saint Martins School of Art on Charing Cross Road.
- A 1973 episode of the television show The Streets of San Francisco titled "The House on Hyde Street" was inspired by the Collyers.
- "Alta Kockers", episode 10 of season 20 of Law & Order: Special Victims Unit, makes reference to the Collyer brothers in the characters Joseph and Benjamin Edelman, who live in a hoard-filled, boobytrapped mansion and have not left the house in decades.

== See also ==
- List of recluses
- List of people from Harlem
