= List of recluses =

This is a list of notable people who have been described as recluses, individuals who live in voluntary seclusion from the public and society. Excluded are religious hermits, as well as people who live otherwise normal lives but value their privacy.

== People ==
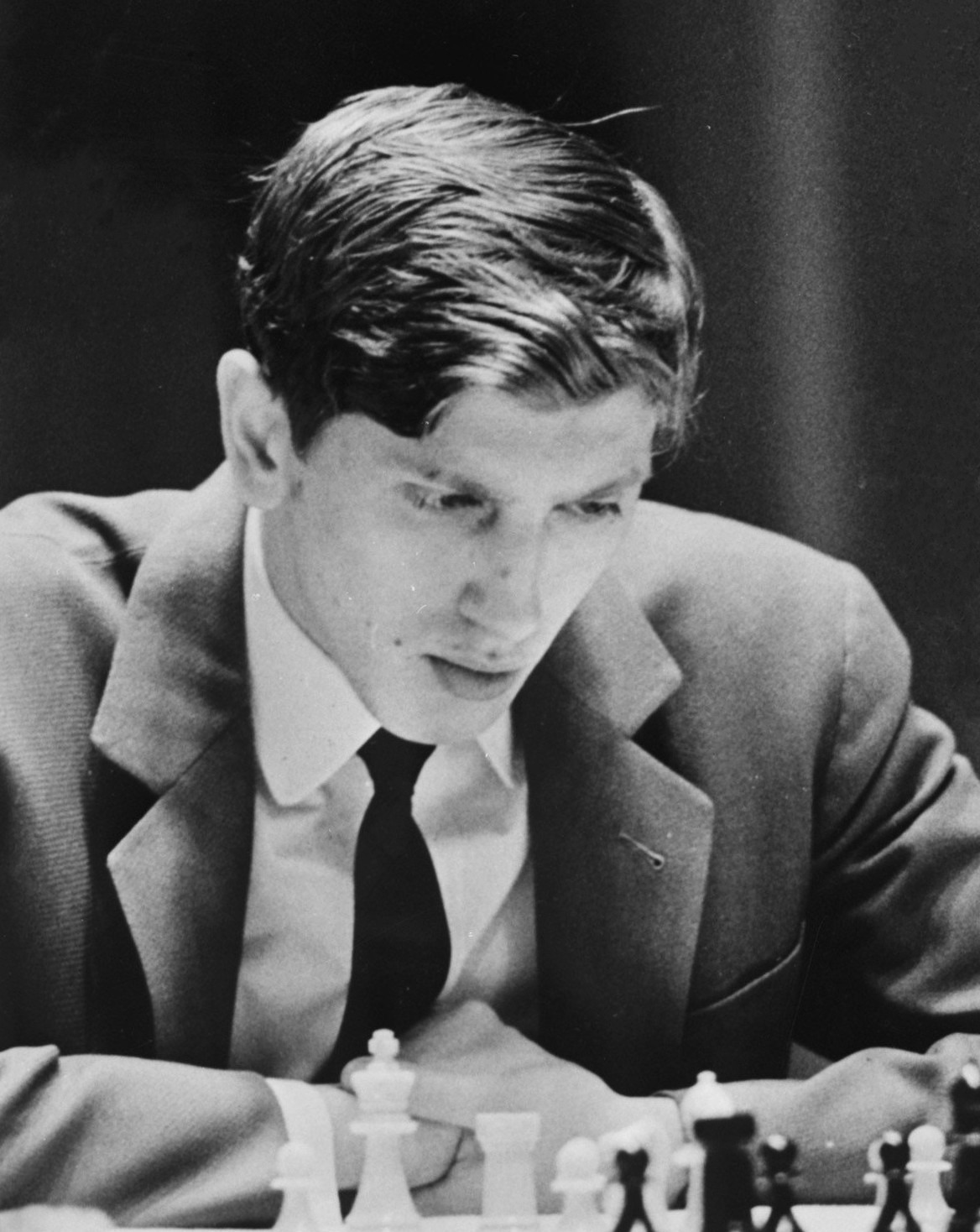
Bobby Fischer, chess champion

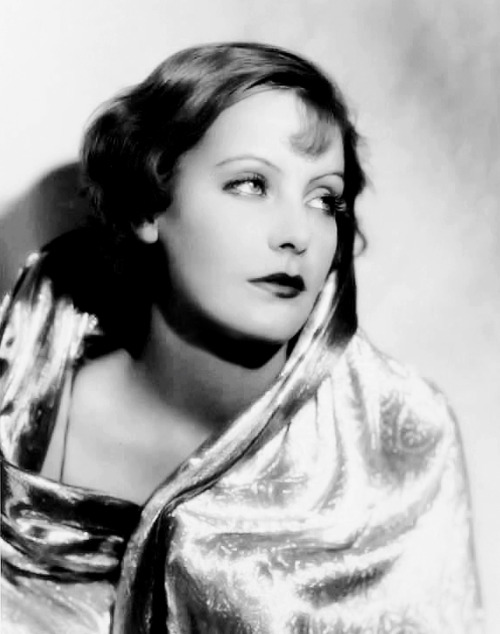
Greta Garbo, actress

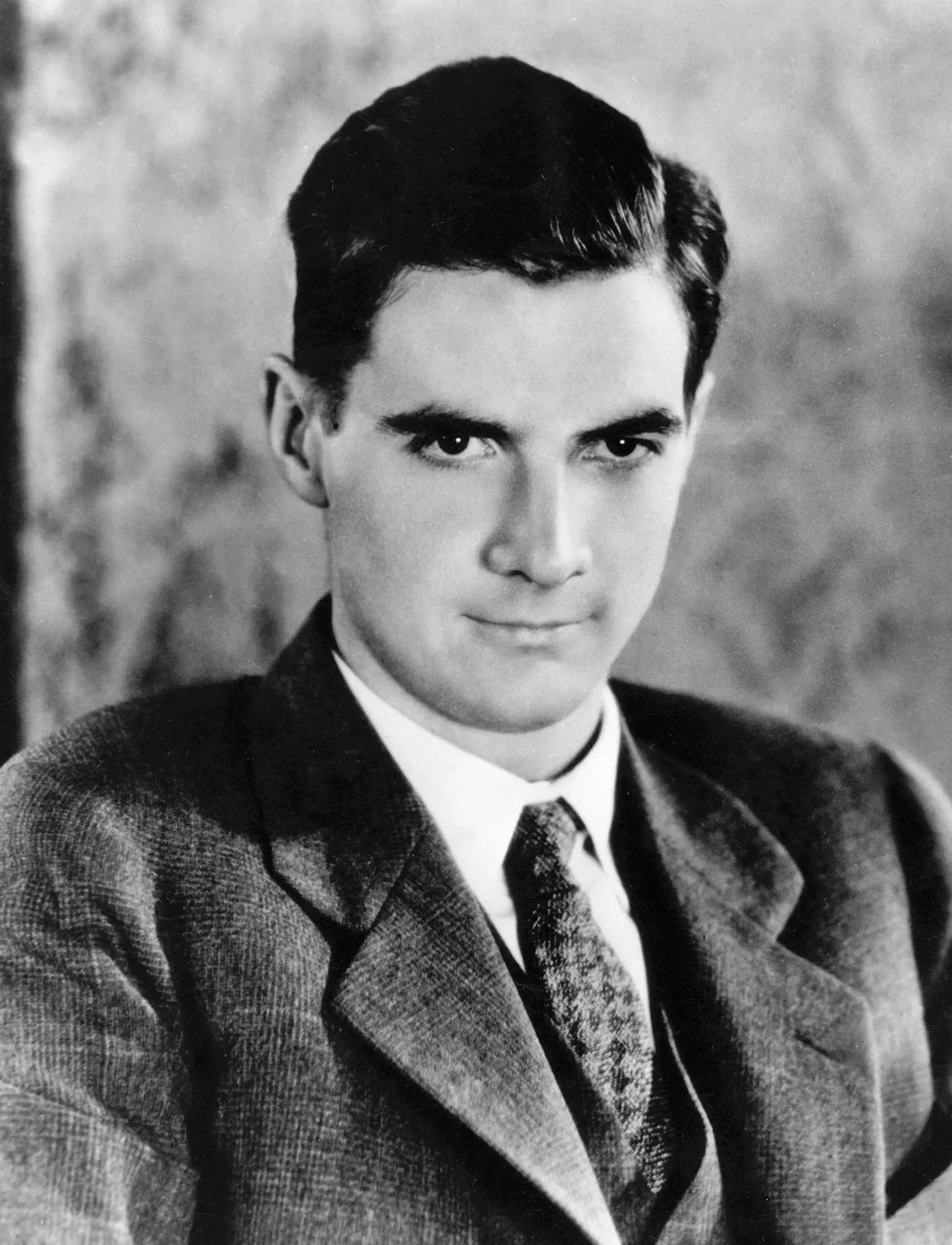
Howard Hughes, business magnate

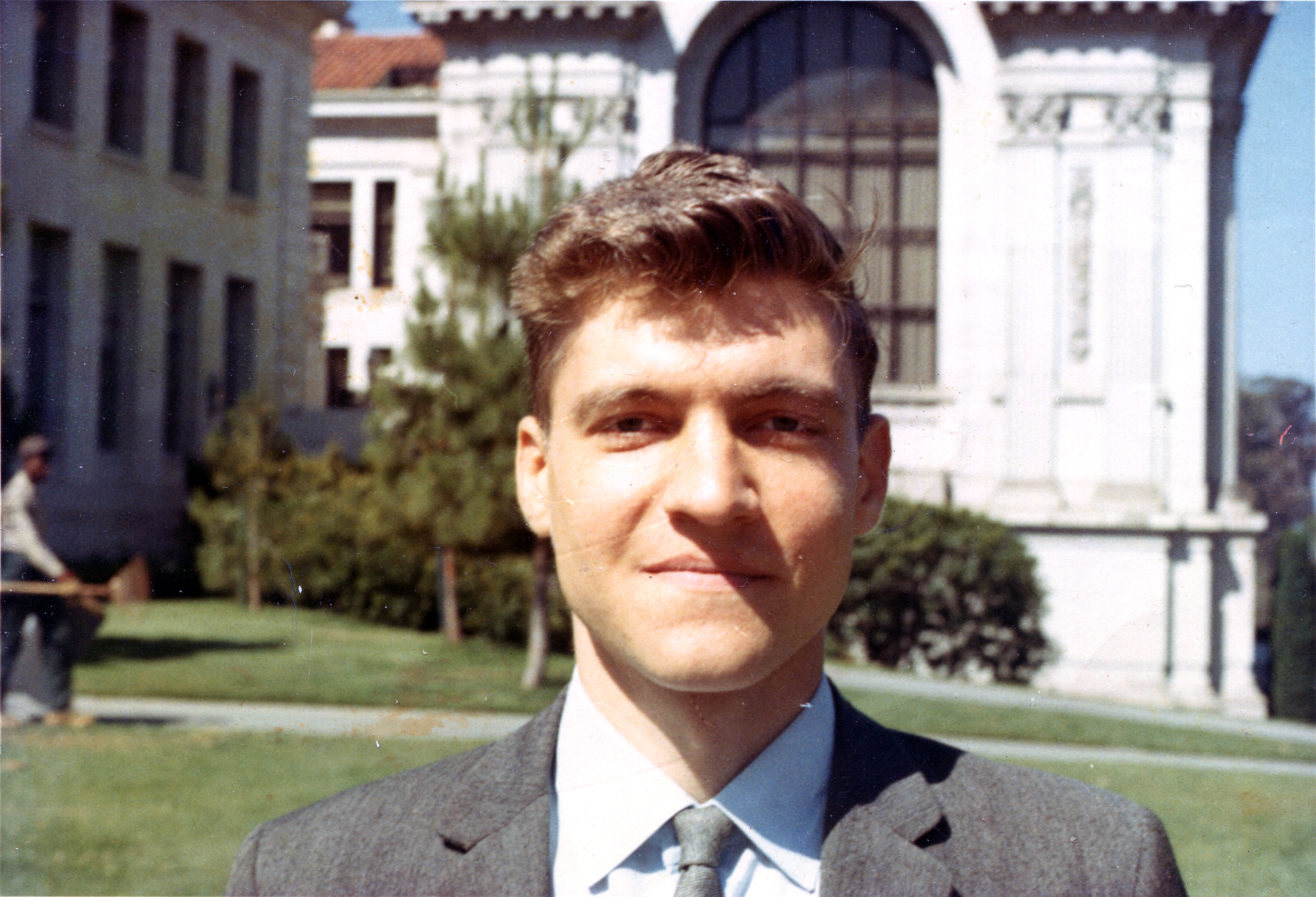
Ted Kaczynski, domestic terrorist and mathematician

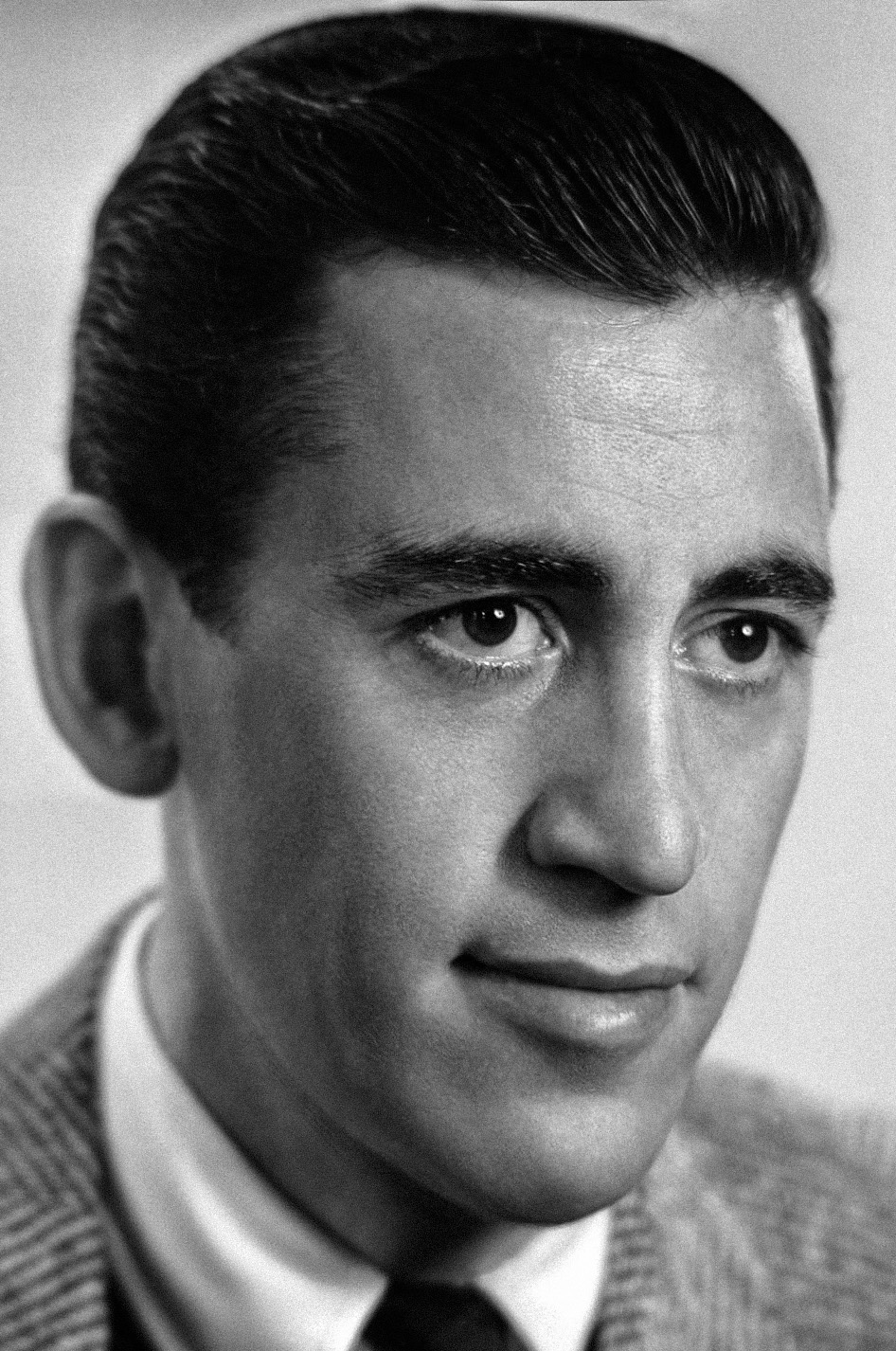
J.D. Salinger, novelist

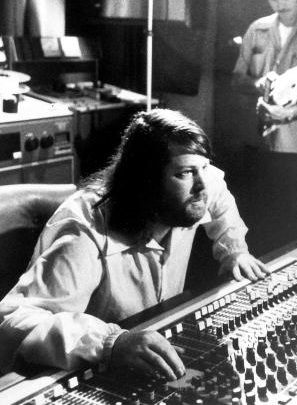
Brian Wilson, musician

Name	Year of birth	Year of death	Description
Devorah Baron	1887	1956	Hebrew author
Syd Barrett	1946	2006	English singer-songwriter, former leader of the band Pink Floyd
Marlon Brando	1924	2004	American actor
Maria Callas	1923	1977	Greek opera singer
Huguette Clark	1906	2011	American heiress and philanthropist
Margaret Clement	1881	1952(?)	Eccentric Australian pauper who sensationally disappeared under mysterious circumstances
John Deacon	1951		English musician, songwriter and former member of the band Queen
Eileen Derbyshire	1931		English actress
Emily Dickinson	1830	1886	American poet
Steve Ditko	1927	2018	American Comic Book illustrator, best known for being the co-creator of Spider-Man and sole creator of Doctor Strange.
Eliza Emily Donnithorne	1826	1886	Australian eccentric, rumored model for Miss Havisham in Great Expectations by Charles Dickens
Rod Evans	1947		English singer who was the original lead singer of the band Deep Purple
Bobby Fischer	1943	2008	American former world chess champion
Greta Garbo	1905	1990	Swedish-American actress
Glenn Gould	1932	1982	Canadian pianist
Alexander Grothendieck	1928	2014	German-French mathematician
Gene Hackman	1930	2025	American actor
Setsuko Hara	1920	2015	Japanese actress
Mark Hollis	1955	2019	British singer, instrumentalist and songwriter who was the lead vocalist of the band Talk Talk
Howard Hughes	1905	1976	American business magnate, record-setting pilot, engineer, film director, and philanthropist
Ted Kaczynski	1942	2023	American domestic terrorist known as the Unabomber
Harper Lee	1926	2016	American author, wrote To Kill a Mockingbird
Arthur MacArthur IV	1938		Only child of US Army General Douglas MacArthur
Jeff Mangum	1970		American singer, songwriter, and musician
Lee Mavers	1962		English singer-songwriter and the lead singer and rhythm guitarist of The La's
Pordenone Montanari	1937		Italian painter, sculptor and philosopher
Kentaro Miura	1966	2021	Japanese manga artist, creator of Berserk
Jimmie Nicol	1939		English drummer, fill-in for Ringo Starr on eight Beatles tour dates in 1964
Richard O'Sullivan	1944	2026	English comedy actor
William Onyeabor	1946	2017	Nigerian funk musician
Marcel Proust	1871	1922	French novelist of In Search of Lost Time
Thomas Pynchon	1937		American novelist
Tommy Quickly	1945		British singer, known for hit song "Tip of My Tongue"
J. D. Salinger	1919	2010	American author who wrote The Catcher in the Rye
Phil Spector	1939	2021	American record producer, songwriter and convicted murderer
Layne Staley	1967	2002	American singer and songwriter who was the original lead vocalist of the band Alice in Chains
Sly Stone	1943	2025	American musician, songwriter and record producer
Patrick Süskind	1949		German writer and screenwriter
John Swartzwelder	1949		American comedy writer best known for his work on The Simpsons
Akira Toriyama	1955	2024	Japanese manga artist and character designer, creator of Dragon Ball
Meg White	1974		American musician best known as the drummer of the rock band the White Stripes.
Brian Wilson	1942	2025	American musician, songwriter and record producer who led the Beach Boys
Jocky Wilson	1950	2012	Scottish former world darts champion
Peter Wilson	1947		Australian former footballer
Ida Wood	1838	1932	American socialite who later chose to remain in seclusion in a New York City hotel suite with two relatives for nearly a quarter century

== Fictional characters ==
Name	Work	Author	Notes
Miss Havisham	Great Expectations	Charles Dickens	
Lestat de Lioncourt	The Vampire Chronicles	Anne Rice	A recluse for extended periods throughout the series.
Boo Radley	To Kill a Mockingbird	Harper Lee	A recluse created by a famous recluse.
The Grinch	How the Grinch Stole Christmas! and its adaptations	Dr. Seuss	
Shrek	Shrek and its adaptations	William Steig	
Gilliat	Toilers of the Sea	Victor Hugo	
