= Death smell =

Smell occurring during decomposition

The smell of death is a smell occurring during decomposition. It is made up of over 800 different chemicals. There have been efforts to synthesize the smell of death. It has also been used as evidence in court trials involving murder.

Decomposition produces a range of volatile compounds, including but not limited to: dimethyl disulfide, dimethyl trisulfide, cadaverine, putrescine, indole, as well as fatty acids. It has been observed that dimethyl disulfide and dimethyl trisulfide occur at higher rates compared to methanethiol. Additionally, anaerobic decomposition produces aldehydes, ketones and esters, which may add a "sickly-sweet" undertone. It is difficult to detect cadaverine and putrescine in conventional GC/MS techniques. However, these two diamines have indeed been identified via specialized analysis approaches in other forms of tissue breakdown or anaerobic bacteria.

== Composition research ==
In 2004, the gasses released during decomposition began to be catalogued by the University of Tennessee Anthropological Research Facility. The research was prompted by a request for assistance in training cadaver dogs to determine if it is possible to distinguish the smell of human corpses from animals. An experiment bottled and stored decomposing flesh from various bodies of animals and humans, keeping all remains in identical conditions. Samples could be periodically taken from the remains over the 6-month test period and 452 organic compounds were recognized during this time. Pigs and humans share the largest amount of organic compounds, only 5 esters found to differentiate the two.

While this study provided useful information, researchers recognized that it is far from being used in direct training of dogs to find human bodies. Another limitation is the small portion of body tissues used during the testing may not be generalizable to entire bodies. Forensic anthropologist Anna Williams also stated that "The decomposition process is very dependent on all the surrounding conditions, temperature, humidity, access by insects, etc., and the (volatile organic compounds) given off are very dependent on which bacteria are active at which time". These factors would suggest that findings from inside the controlled lab with artificial conditions are far from creating an exact profile of what should be present/absent when identifying the organic compounds which signify a "death scent" as human. To introduce the volatile organic compounds or VOC, they use a "body farm" to monitor an environment of the variables. The other body farm doing VOC research to identify or confirm results is outside the US, The Australian Facility for Taphonomic Experimental Research.

== Synthetic production for training ==
The goal is to eventually synthesize the death smell of Putrescine and cadaverine, as not all facilities have access to human cadavers, for the training of cadaver dogs, and possibly even creation of an electric nose to sniff out human remains.

== Use as evidence ==
The "smell of death" research has been permitted as evidence in court. In the 2011 Caylee Anthony case, in which Casey Anthony was accused of having murdered her 2-year-old daughter, the scent from inside the trunk of the car in which she was accused of having stored a dead body was collected and then assessed by an expert witness. The analysis of the air detected 41 of the compounds involved in decomposition, but elements expected from human decomposition were missing.
