= Marcia Davenport =

American novelist (1903–1996)

- Born: Marcia Glick; June 9, 1903; New York City, U.S.
- Died: January 16, 1996 (aged 92); Pebble Beach, California, U.S.
- Occupations: Author, music critic
- Spouses: Frank Delmas Clarke (m. 1923; div. 1925) Russell Davenport (m. 1929; div. 1944)
- Children: 2
- Mother: Alma Gluck
- Relatives: Efrem Zimbalist Jr. (half-brother)

Marcia Davenport (née Glick; June 9, 1903 – January 16, 1996) was an American writer and music critic. She is best known for her 1932 biography of composer Wolfgang Amadeus Mozart, the first American published biography of Mozart. Davenport also is known for her novels The Valley of Decision and East Side, West Side, both of which were adapted to film in 1945 and 1949, respectively.

== Early life and education ==
Marcia Davenport was born Marcia Glick in New York City on June 9, 1903, the daughter of Bernard Glick and the opera singer Alma Gluck. Her family is of Romanian-Jewish descent. Around 1911, when Marcia was 8, her parents separated. Her mother remarried Efrem Zimbalist, a concert violinist. With Zimbalist as a step-father, Marcia had two half-siblings: Efrem Zimbalist Jr. (who became an actor) and Maria Virginia Zimbalist Bennett.

She described her childhood as very lonely, apart from music and books (she always knew she wanted to write). Her mother made her continue piano lessons as discipline throughout childhood despite her being very bad at it.

Growing up, Marcia traveled extensively with her parents. Intermittently, she was educated at the Friends School in Philadelphia, Pennsylvania, and the Shipley School in Bryn Mawr. She began studies at Wellesley College but eloped to Pittsburgh after two years to marry her first husband, Frank Delmas Clarke. After their divorce in 1925, she travelled abroad to complete her B.A. at the University of Grenoble.

== Career ==
After her divorce from Clarke in 1925, Davenport took an advertising copywriting job to support herself and her daughter. From 1928 to 1930, she worked on the editorial staff of The New Yorker.

From 1934 to 1939, Davenport worked as the music critic of Stage magazine. From 1936 to 1937, she also worked as a radio commentator on the Metropolitan Opera broadcasts. Through her opera-singing mother and violinist stepfather, Davenport had close ties to the classical music world, particularly the operatic world of Europe and America.

=== Biography of Mozart ===
In 1930, Davenport travelled to Prague to research the life of composer Wolfgang Amadeus Mozart up close. In 1932, she published her first book, Mozart, which was also the first American published biography of the composer. Widely praised, the book, which became Davenport's best known work, has remained continuously in print since its publication.

=== Novels ===
In 1936, Davenport published her first novel, Of Lena Geyer. The story is a portrait of an opera singer, told through the eyes of a devoted fan, her French duke lover, a platonic female friend, her maestro, and others. It is thought that inspiration for the book was taken from Davenport's mother, Alma Gluck. Gluck was born in Romania as Reba Feinsohn; Alma Gluck later became her stage name as a soprano opera singer. She was well known for being one of the 20th century's premier concert and recording artists. If Of Lena Geyer is not based on Alma Gluck, it is possible Davenport took inspiration from her personal life experience, or from the tales of another opera singer, Olive Fremstad. Lena's intense relationship with a conductor may have been based on a relationship between Gluck and Toscanini. Suggestions of a lesbian relationship are not supported by the contents of the novel.

In 1942, Davenport published her most popular fiction novel, The Valley of Decision, a historical fiction saga which traces the Scott family, prototypical owners of an iron works in Pittsburgh, from 1873 to the events of World War II. Davenport lived in Pittsburgh shortly after her first marriage with Frank Delmas Clarke, later using that background for her novel, along with further research on the steel industry, for the 788-page bestseller. Portions of the book are set in 1930's Prague, depicting the increasingly grim atmosphere up to the Munich Agreement and the Nazi Occupation of Czechoslovakia. In this Davenport made use of her knowledge of Prague, gained during the research for the Mozart book.

In 1947, East Side, West Side was published, also becoming a best-seller. It was one of the last works edited by Maxwell Perkins of the Charles Scribner's Sons publishing house.

Her memoir Too Strong for Fantasy (1967) describes the people, the music, the places and the political forces which shaped her life. Of particular interest is her telling of the events leading up to the death of the Czech diplomat and foreign minister Jan Masaryk in the Czernin Palace in Prague in 1948 and of her close relationship with Masaryk over many years.

==== Film adaptations ====
Two of Davenport's novels have been made into films, both released by Metro-Goldwyn-Mayer: The Valley of Decision and East Side, West Side. The Valley of Decision starred Greer Garson, Gregory Peck, Donald Crisp, Lionel Barrymore, Preston Foster, Marsha Hunt, Gladys Cooper, Reginald Owen, Dan Duryea and Jessica Tandy. The film was nominated for Academy Awards for Best Actress in a Leading Role (Greer Garson) and Best Music, Scoring of a Dramatic or Comedy Picture.

East Side, West Side starred James Mason, Barbara Stanwyck, Van Heflin, and Ava Gardner.

My Brother's Keeper (1954), based on the Collyer brothers, was optioned for films to various individuals over decades, but no film was ever produced.

=== Radio ===
During the 1930s, Davenport was a regular commentator on the radio broadcasts of the Metropolitan Opera, though she appeared infrequently in subsequent decades, with her final Met broadcast being in 1966. During the 1940s, she was heard on various radio panel discussion shows. On January 23, 1943, she was serving as a panelist on The People's Platform with Rex Stout and Alexander Woollcott when the latter suffered a heart attack during the broadcast and subsequently died before his arrival at Roosevelt Hospital.

In 1967, Davenport appeared on the NBC radio program Toscanini: The Man Behind the Legend, paying tribute to the legendary Italian conductor Arturo Toscanini, with whom she had a love affair.

== Personal life ==
Davenport married Frank Delmas Clarke in April 1923. Her first child, Patricia Delmas Clarke, was born in 1924. In 1925, she and Clarke divorced.

On May 13, 1929, she married Russell Davenport, and changed her name to Marcia Davenport. Russell Davenport became editor of Fortune magazine soon after marrying Marcia. The couple never had to worry about money, and together they travelled abroad to Europe often. The couple had homes in Milan, Lake Como, Salzburg, and Vienna. In an interview with the New York Times, Marcia Davenport said that once, Russell Davenport gave her a lion as a gift. Marcia and Russell Davenport had a daughter, Cornelia Whipple Davenport, in 1934. Her marriage to Russell Davenport ended in 1944.

During the later part of the Nazi occupation of Czechoslovakia, Marcia Davenport became a close friend of the refugee Czech statesman, Jan Masaryk. Davenport lived in Prague with Masaryk from 1945 to 1948, until the Communists seized power. Davenport thereupon returned to London, where she and Masaryk planned to be married as soon as he could join her, but only a few days later he was found dead under mysterious circumstances.

== Death ==
In the last years of her life, Davenport lived in Pebble Beach, California. She died on January 16, 1996, at a hospital in Monterey, at the age of 92. She was survived by her younger daughter Cornelia Davenport Schwartz, six grandchildren, and seven great-grandchildren. Davenport's papers are archived at the University of Pittsburgh and in the Library of Congress.

== Honors ==
A memorial plaque dedicated to Marcia Davenport at Loretánská Street 13 in Prague.

== Works ==
=== Non-fiction ===
- Mozart (New York: Charles Scribner's Sons, 1932)
- Garibaldi: Father of Modern Italy (New York: Random House, 1956)
- Too Strong for Fantasy (New York: Charles Scribner's Sons, 1967) (Memoir)
- Jan Masaryk: Posledni Portret (Czechoslovakia: 1990) (Memoir)

=== Fiction ===
- Of Lena Geyer (New York: Charles Scribner's Sons, 1936)
- The Valley of Decision (New York: Charles Scribner's Sons, 1942)
- East Side, West Side (New York: Charles Scribner's Sons, 1947)
- My Brother's Keeper (New York: Charles Scribner's Sons, 1954)
- The Constant Image (New York: Charles Scribner's Sons, 1960)
