= Kettle of Fish (bar) =

Coordinates: 40°44′02″N 74°00′09″W

General information
- Location: 59 Christopher St., New York City
- Inaugurated: 1950
- Relocated: 1987, 1999

Website
- www.kettleoffishnyc.com

Kettle of Fish is a historic bar in Greenwich Village, Manhattan, New York City. The bar was opened in 1950 on MacDougal Street, but in 1987 it relocated to the former site of Gerde's Folk City, before moving again in 1999 to its new location at 59 Christopher Street, which was the longtime (1958–1996) site of the literary watering hole The Lion's Head.

== History ==
Kettle of Fish is associated with Beat Generation figures such as Jack Kerouac and Allen Ginsberg and was also frequented by folk revival musicians such as Bob Dylan. During the 1960s, Kettle of Fish was located above The Gaslight Cafe, and performers at the Gaslight would often go to the Kettle between sets. According to Blues figure Dick Waterman: "Whoever was playing at the Gaslight, they went upstairs between sets. The Kettle of Fish had a bar on the left and a middle aisle all the way back to the restrooms... Bob Dylan and his manager, Albert Grossman, always sat at the back table with their backs against the air conditioner, looking at the room."

Musician Tom Paxton, discussing the Gaslight, noted that during the 1960s "it was really the Kettle of Fish where all the ideas, gossip, songs, and friendships were exchanged. There were constant comings and goings, and the cast of characters included Bob Dylan, Phil Ochs, Dave Van Ronk, Eric Andersen, and David Blue." The original MacDougal Street facade was recreated for the 2013 film Inside Llewyn Davis, loosely based on the life of Van Ronk. A recreation of the original location has also been featured in the TV series The Marvelous Mrs. Maisel, which took place in the 1950s and 60s.

As of 2013, Kettle of Fish is a New York City Green Bay Packer bar, and has been visited by Packers players such as Aaron Rodgers, Jerry Kramer, and Dave Robinson.

Like other bars in New York City, Kettle of Fish was shut down in March 2020 during the COVID-19 pandemic. In order to meet their high rent payments, the owners launched a GoFundMe campaign with a goal of raising $100,000. The funding campaign and the hashtag #savethekettle was shared on Twitter by a number of celebrities, including Aaron Rodgers.
