= List of The New York Times number-one books of 1951 =

This is a list of books that topped The New York Times best-seller list in 1951.

== Fiction ==
The following list ranks the number-one best-selling fiction books.

Date	Book	Author
January 7	The Disenchanted	Budd Schulberg
January 14	Joy Street	Frances Parkinson Keyes
January 21	Joy Street	Frances Parkinson Keyes
January 28	Joy Street	Frances Parkinson Keyes
February 4	Joy Street	Frances Parkinson Keyes
February 11	Joy Street	Frances Parkinson Keyes
February 18	The Disenchanted	Budd Schulberg
February 25	Joy Street	Frances Parkinson Keyes
March 4	Joy Street	Frances Parkinson Keyes
March 11	The Disenchanted	Budd Schulberg
March 18	Joy Street	Frances Parkinson Keyes
March 25	From Here to Eternity	James Jones
April 1	From Here to Eternity	James Jones
April 8	From Here to Eternity	James Jones
April 15	From Here to Eternity	James Jones
April 22	From Here to Eternity	James Jones
April 29	From Here to Eternity	James Jones
May 6	From Here to Eternity	James Jones
May 13	From Here to Eternity	James Jones
May 20	From Here to Eternity	James Jones
May 27	From Here to Eternity	James Jones
June 3	From Here to Eternity	James Jones
June 10	From Here to Eternity	James Jones
June 17	From Here to Eternity	James Jones
June 24	From Here to Eternity	James Jones
July 1	From Here to Eternity	James Jones
July 8	From Here to Eternity	James Jones
July 15	From Here to Eternity	James Jones
July 22	From Here to Eternity	James Jones
July 29	From Here to Eternity	James Jones
August 5	From Here to Eternity	James Jones
August 12	The Caine Mutiny	Herman Wouk
August 19	The Caine Mutiny	Herman Wouk
August 26	The Caine Mutiny	Herman Wouk
September 2	The Caine Mutiny	Herman Wouk
September 9	The Caine Mutiny	Herman Wouk
September 16	The Caine Mutiny	Herman Wouk
September 23	The Caine Mutiny	Herman Wouk
September 30	The Caine Mutiny	Herman Wouk
October 7	The Caine Mutiny	Herman Wouk
October 14	The Caine Mutiny	Herman Wouk
October 21	The Caine Mutiny	Herman Wouk
October 28	The Caine Mutiny	Herman Wouk
November 4	The Caine Mutiny	Herman Wouk
November 11	The Caine Mutiny	Herman Wouk
November 18	The Caine Mutiny	Herman Wouk
November 25	The Caine Mutiny	Herman Wouk
December 2	The Caine Mutiny	Herman Wouk
December 9	The Caine Mutiny	Herman Wouk
December 16	The Caine Mutiny	Herman Wouk
December 23	The Caine Mutiny	Herman Wouk
December 30	The Caine Mutiny	Herman Wouk

== Nonfiction ==
The following list ranks the number-one best-selling nonfiction books.

Date	Book	Author
January 7	Kon-Tiki	Thor Heyerdahl
January 14	Kon-Tiki	Thor Heyerdahl
January 21	Kon-Tiki	Thor Heyerdahl
January 28	Kon-Tiki	Thor Heyerdahl
February 4	Kon-Tiki	Thor Heyerdahl
February 11	Kon-Tiki	Thor Heyerdahl
February 18	Kon-Tiki	Thor Heyerdahl
February 25	Kon-Tiki	Thor Heyerdahl
March 4	Kon-Tiki	Thor Heyerdahl
March 11	Kon-Tiki	Thor Heyerdahl
March 18	Kon-Tiki	Thor Heyerdahl
March 25	Kon-Tiki	Thor Heyerdahl
April 1	Washington Confidential	Jack Lait and Lee Mortimer
April 8	Washington Confidential	Jack Lait and Lee Mortimer
April 15	Washington Confidential	Jack Lait and Lee Mortimer
April 22	Washington Confidential	Jack Lait and Lee Mortimer
April 29	Washington Confidential	Jack Lait and Lee Mortimer
May 6	Washington Confidential	Jack Lait and Lee Mortimer
May 13	Washington Confidential	Jack Lait and Lee Mortimer
May 20	Washington Confidential	Jack Lait and Lee Mortimer
May 27	Washington Confidential	Jack Lait and Lee Mortimer
June 3	Washington Confidential	Jack Lait and Lee Mortimer
June 10	Washington Confidential	Jack Lait and Lee Mortimer
June 17	Washington Confidential	Jack Lait and Lee Mortimer
June 24	Washington Confidential	Jack Lait and Lee Mortimer
July 1	Kon-Tiki	Thor Heyerdahl
July 8	Kon-Tiki	Thor Heyerdahl
July 15	Kon-Tiki	Thor Heyerdahl
July 22	Kon-Tiki	Thor Heyerdahl
July 29	Kon-Tiki	Thor Heyerdahl
August 5	Kon-Tiki	Thor Heyerdahl
August 12	Kon-Tiki	Thor Heyerdahl
August 19	Kon-Tiki	Thor Heyerdahl
August 26	Kon-Tiki	Thor Heyerdahl
September 2	Kon-Tiki	Thor Heyerdahl
September 9	The Sea Around Us	Rachel Carson
September 16	The Sea Around Us	Rachel Carson
September 23	The Sea Around Us	Rachel Carson
September 30	The Sea Around Us	Rachel Carson
October 7	The Sea Around Us	Rachel Carson
October 14	The Sea Around Us	Rachel Carson
October 21	The Sea Around Us	Rachel Carson
October 28	The Sea Around Us	Rachel Carson
November 4	The Sea Around Us	Rachel Carson
November 11	The Sea Around Us	Rachel Carson
November 18	The Sea Around Us	Rachel Carson
November 25	The Sea Around Us	Rachel Carson
December 2	The Sea Around Us	Rachel Carson
December 9	The Sea Around Us	Rachel Carson
December 16	The Sea Around Us	Rachel Carson
December 23	The Sea Around Us	Rachel Carson
December 30	The Sea Around Us	Rachel Carson

== See also ==
- Publishers Weekly list of bestselling novels in the United States in the 1950s
