= New Orleans Foundation for Francophone Cultures =

New Orleans Foundation for Francophone Cultures (Nous!)
- Established: 2020
- Founders: Scott Tilton and Rudy Bazenet
- Type: 501(c)(3) non-profit organization
- Purpose: Revitalize Louisiana's heritage cultures
- Website: www.nous-foundation.org

The New Orleans Foundation for Francophone Cultures (also known as Nous!) is a 501(c)(3) non-profit organization with the purpose of "supporting and revitalizing Louisiana's heritage cultures, focusing on Cajun, Creole, and indigenous communities." It was founded in 2020 by Scott Tilton and Rudy Bazenet and is currently headquartered in the French Quarter of New Orleans, Louisiana.

== History ==
The foundation was co-founded in 2020 by Scott Tilton and Rudy Bazenet, cultural activists who previously led the initiative that resulted in Louisiana joining the L'Organisation internationale de la Francophonie in 2018. The founders envisioned Nous! as a contemporary cultural hub for Louisiana's heritage cultures, drawing inspiration from cultural centers seen in Paris.

Originally housed inside the BK Historic House and Gardens, Nous! opened its French Quarter space in December 2025. This was completed in collaboration with the Historic New Orleans Collection. Their space is designed as an information center, gallery, French language bookstore, and coworking studio. It is also part of the French Quarter Museum Association.

== Operations ==
=== Programs ===
Nous! has four main areas of programming:

- La Galerie: a gallery space in their headquarters that displays biannual original exhibitions highlighting Louisiana's Francophone culture, history, and art.
- L'Académie: French and Louisiana heritage language thematic workshops and conversation classes run in collaboration with L'Union Française and other teachers.
- Le Studio: an independent publishing label (called Nous) which includes a record label, film studio, and publishing company.
- Public Support: includes Dr. Homer J. Dupuy Grant Program, Le Lab cultural accelerator and mentorship program, and study-abroad scholarships.

=== Original Exhibitions and Publications ===
- Haiti-Louisiana (2024)
- Musique(s)! (2025) –– included a record, short film, and accompanying book
- L'Amérique selon la Louisiane: Louisiana's America (upcoming, 2026)

== See also ==
- French Louisiana
- Louisiana French
- History of New Orleans
- French Quarter
