= The Explorer (novel) =

Novel by Frances Parkinson Keyes

- Cover of the book (first edition)
- Author: Frances Parkinson Keyes
- Cover artist: William Steinel
- Language: English
- Genre: Fiction
- Set in: Virginia, 1953
- Published: 1964
- Publisher: McGraw-Hill Book Company, NY
- Publication place: United States
- Media type: Print (hardback and paperback)
- Pages: 433 (first edition)
- ISBN: 978-0413438300

The Explorer is a 1964 novel by American author Frances Parkinson Keyes. Set in Virginia 1953, the novel was originally released by McGraw-Hill Book Company, there have since been several reprints of her book, with the latest release in paperback format in June 1994 by Hodder General Publishing Division.

== Plot ==
The Explorer, tells the story of Nicolas Hale, a transplanted Vermonter who was inspired by Hiram Bingham's amazing discovery of Machu Picchu in Peru.

Nicolas had avoided marriage until his desire for a son to carry on his profession and inherit his name compelled him to propose to Margaret Porterfield, an aristocratic young Virginian whom he envisions as the type of woman he would like to be the mother of his son. He has been her ideal suitor for a long time, and she quickly agrees to a fast marriage just five days before he departs on a new exploring venture in Peru.

He doesn't hide from her that she'll never be able to share his life there, and that exploring is his only great passion, and that she would have to endure long periods of separation from him.

Nicolas only visits on occasion over the next five years, spending the majority of his time in the Andes in quest of the hidden city whose discovery, if his aspirations are realized, will offer him fame and prosperity, but his absence leads to a separation from his wife and a marriage that ends with disastrous consequences.

== Characters ==
Nicolas Hale, an explorer.

- Mr. and Mrs. Waldo Hale of Woodstock, Vermont, his parents.
- Clarissa and Narcissa Hale, his twin sisters.
- Hiram Bingham, his ideal as an explorer.
- Lester Wendell, his secretary.
- Sam Steinmetz and Esther Schaeffer, New York friends of Nicolas Hale and Margaret Poterfield.

Margaret Porterfied, of Hills' End Plantation, Virginia, who becomes the wife of Nicolas Hale.

- Cassie, Annabelle and Rufus, black servants at Hill's End.
- Dr. Virginius Page, Margaret's uncle.
- Dr. Leonidas Bates, Rector of Pohick Church which Margaret attends.
- Dr. George Loomis, Margaret's physician.
- Perdita, Margaret's dog.
