= Frances Parkinson Keyes =

American novelist, memoirist, biographer

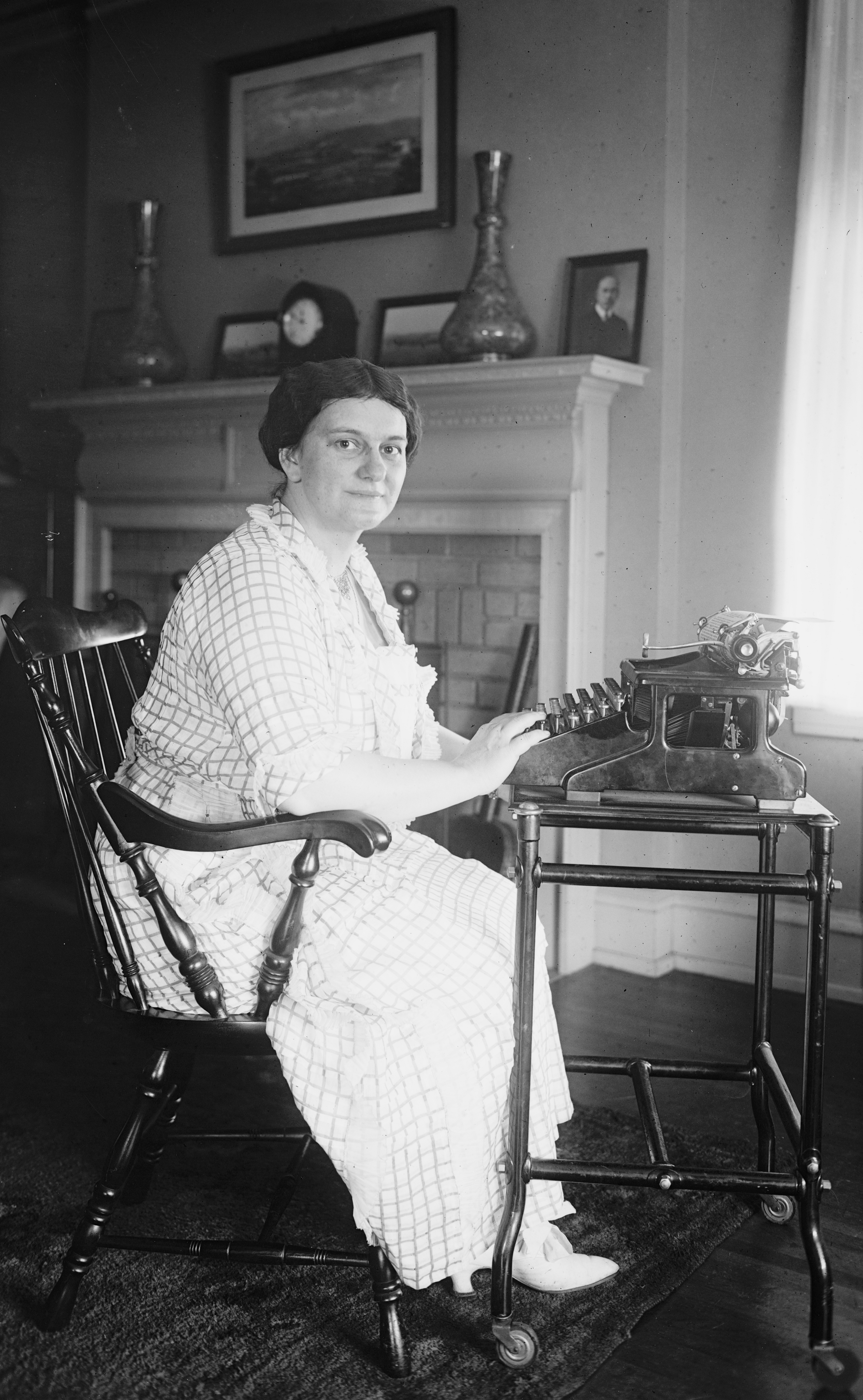
Frances Parkinson Keyes in 1921

Frances Parkinson Keyes (July 21, 1885 – July 3, 1970) was an American author who wrote about her life as the wife of a U.S. Senator and also wrote novels set in New England, Louisiana, and Europe. A convert to Roman Catholicism, her later works frequently featured Catholic themes and beliefs. Her last name rhymes with "eyes", not "keys".

== Life and career ==
Frances Parkinson Wheeler was born in Charlottesville, Virginia. Her mother, Louise Fuller Johnson, was the daughter of Edward Carlton Johnson, who was born in Newbury, Vermont. In 1868, Louise married her first husband, James Underhill, a New York lawyer, and they had a son, James Underhill Jr., who eventually became a geological engineer and lived in Colorado. In 1878, Louise became a widow. She then married Classics scholar John Henry Wheeler, a graduate of Harvard (B.A. 1871; A.M. 1875) and the University of Bonn (PhD 1879), who taught at Bowdoin College before being appointed to a professorship at the University of Virginia. Their only child, Frances Parkinson Wheeler, was named after paternal grandmother Frances Cochran Parkinson Wheeler. Illness forced John Henry Wheeler to resign his professorship and the family moved to Newbury, Vermont, where John Henry Wheeler died. Louise then married Boston lawyer Albert Pillsbury. The couple divorced in 1897. When Louise Fuller Johnson Wheeler Pillsbury was sixty-seven years old, she married a twenty-two year old Newbury dairy farmer named William Taisey.

Frances learned to read from her grandmother Wheeler. She said the most valuable education she received was a year she spent in Europe in 1895. Her formal education was mainly received at Miss Winsor's School in Boston. She attempted but failed to gain admittance to Bryn Mawr College.

On June 8, 1904, eighteen-year-old Frances married forty-year-old Henry (Harry) Wilder Keyes. Harry Keyes, a Harvard graduate, had been born in Newbury, Vermont, but raised in Haverhill, New Hampshire. He inherited Pine Grove Farm (formerly called the General Moses Dow Farm) from his father. He was a banker who became a Republican politician and served one term as Governor of New Hampshire (1917-1919) before his election to the United States Senate (1919-1937).

Frances Parkinson Keyes relates her story of their courtship in her first book of autobiography, Roses in December, and her story of their marriage in her second, All Flags Flying. According to Keyes, before their marriage, she extracted a promise from Harry that should they have a daughter she would be given the opportunity to attend college. Frances and Harry had three sons together: Henry Wilder Keyes, Jr. (b. 1905), John Parkinson Keyes (b. 1907), and Francis (called Peter) Keyes (b. 1912). All three sons attended Harvard University.

Keyes began writing while living at Pine Grove Farm. Her first article, "The Pride and Form of Mourning" was published in November 1917 in a New York magazine called The Chronicle. It endorsed the idea that women who had lost a loved one in the war should wear a gold star as a symbol of their sacrifice. Next came the publication of her sketch of her grandmother Frances Parkinson in The Granite Monthly, a New Hampshire magazine that went on to publish more of Keyes's historical sketches and a few of her stories. Greater success was achieved with the publication of her article "Satisfied Reflections of a Semi-Bostonian" in the Atlantic Monthly in December 1918. Her first novel, The Old Gray Homestead was published by Houghton Mifflin in 1919.

While Keyes was writing her poems and articles it became clear to her that her mother, previously very supportive of Frances' efforts, had become fervently against Frances' writing. After The Old Homestead was published it became evident that there was opposition to her writing not only from her mother but her husband as well. In the New England Quarterly' s article called Restless Lady it is recounted that Keyes told a reporter that her husband thought her fondness for scribbling "as unfriendly and disparaging" her mother’s. To avoid his disapproval she used the attic of their farmhouse to write her articles and books, hiding them in her underwear drawer. She later said, she was living a life of deception. To the reporter it appeared evident that “Nobody believed she could write and nobody wanted her to write.”

There was another important impetus for Frances to continue writing. She was earning money, and she used the money to pay bills. Even though her husband Harry became a U.S. Senator, the family was not wealthy. When a store in Boston denied them credit when she was trying to buy a new gown she realized she must find a way to pay for her own clothes. Payments she received from Atlantic Monthly and Houghton Mifflin enabled her to pay of medical bills, local travel expenses as well as allowing her to buy new clothing to "meet the demands of her position as the wife of a United States senator". With her earnings she gained the realization that she had a "destiny of her...own", apart from her life as a wife and mother.

After moving to Washington, D.C., Keyes wrote a series of articles for Good Housekeeping magazine titled "Letters from a Senator's Wife." These were eventually collected into a book by the same name, one of three nonfiction books she wrote about her experiences in Washington. (The others were Capital Kaleidoscope and All Flags Flying. Her 1941 novel All That Glitters is also about Washington politics.)

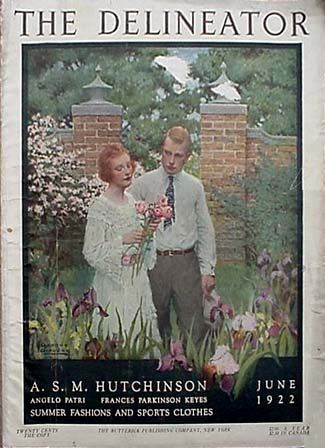
A Keyes work was featured in The Delineator for June 1922

In 1934 Keyes received an honorary degree of Litt.D. from Bates College. After her spouse's death in 1938, she wrote books and magazine articles prolifically. Her novels are set in New England, Virginia, Louisiana, Normandy, and South America, reflecting her upbringing and extensive travels.

In the 1950s, Keyes purchased the historic Beauregard House in New Orleans’ French Quarter and became a fixture of New Orleans life. The house had been built by the grandfather of chess master Paul Morphy, whose life is the subject of Keyes' book The Chess Players. The circumstances of the house's construction and early habitation are told in that book.

Many of Keyes' books are set in south Louisiana, and she eloquently described societal life and conventions in her historical novels. Keyes' novel Blue Camellia tells about the development of areas in south Louisiana from swampland to productive rice farms. The River Road concerns sugar plantations of the Mississippi River Delta and Crescent Carnival (her first Louisiana novel) tells the history of Carnival since the 1890s (with a good deal about Creole culture and its decline during that period). Once On Esplanade: A Cycle Between Two Creole Weddings is a fictionalized biography, originally written for teenage girls, of the Creole woman who provided Keyes with much of her understanding of Creole life between the Civil War and the First World War.

She went to great lengths to research her subject matter and ensure the historical, geographical, linguistic and even scientific accuracy of her writings. Many of her books include a dozen or more real people among the characters, many famous, some obscure and some even still living at the time she wrote them into her books (with their permission, of course). Keyes traveled on location to learn about her topics and enlisted local historians and residents to assist her. The meticulousness of her detailed accounts make her novels valuable tools for learning about a time long past and customs that have died away.

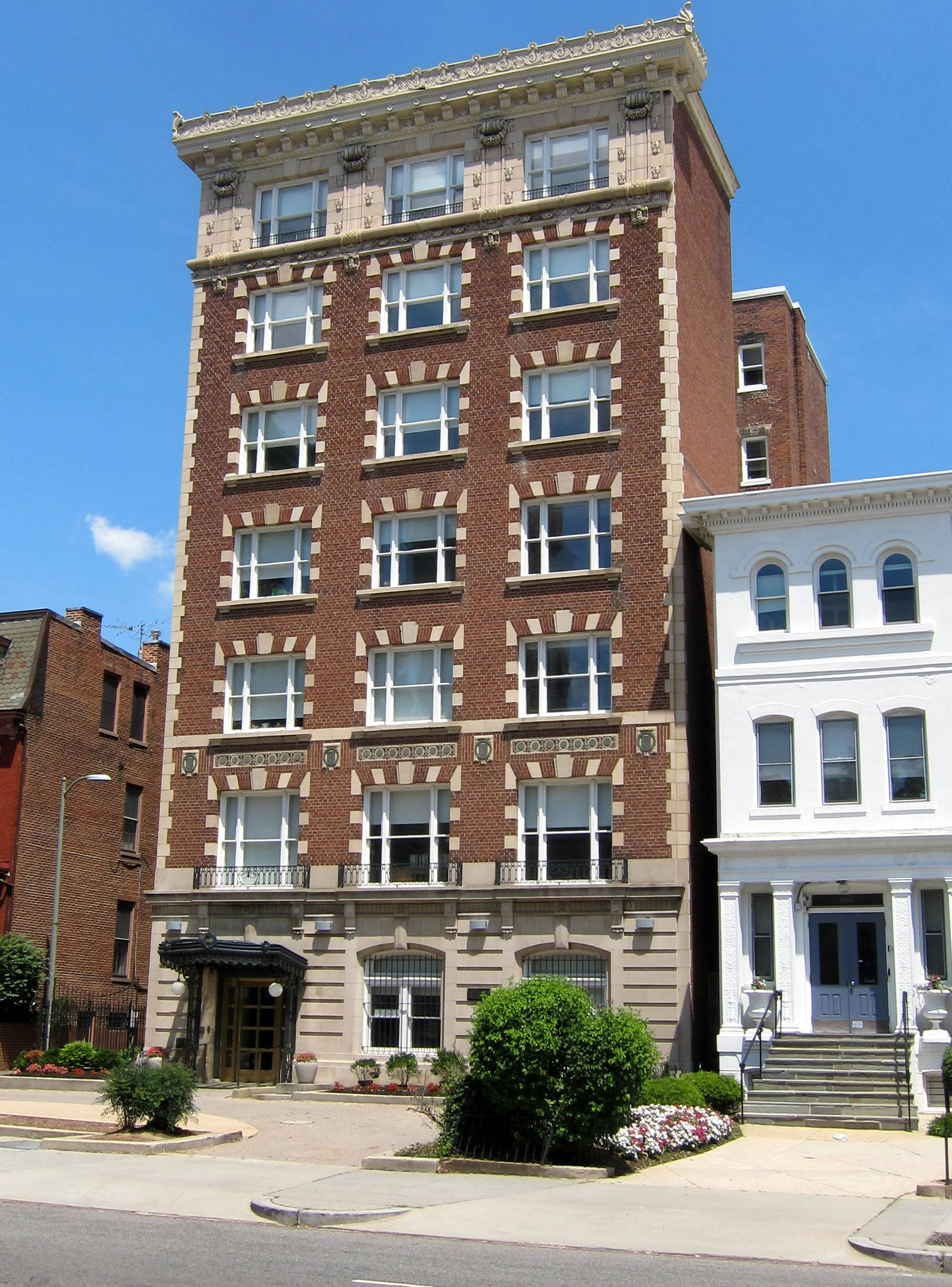
Keyes' former residence in Washington, D.C.

Modern readers will find her depictions of African-American characters generally regressive and simplistic, and there are occasional patches of the pre-World War II fashionable anti-Semitism in her Jewish characters. Some of her Irish and Italian characters are clichéd, or even burlesques of stereotypes. While Keyes was a popular author of the 1940s and 50s, existing editions of her books are becoming rare, and many libraries have removed her books from their shelves. There are a number of fan discussion sites devoted to her work, especially her Catholicism, which appeals to her many Catholic fans.

Keyes' conversion to Catholicism can be traced through her writings. As her world expanded from that of an educated New Englander to an increasingly sophisticated political wife and international traveler, so did her interest in the Catholic religion. She met many devout Catholics who were leaders beyond the realm of the Church. In the introduction to "Tongues of Fire," her book about Christian missionaries fueled by the Holy Spirit, she humorously notes that it may have been during the hour-long sermons of the Congregationalist church that she "took her first steps toward Catholicism."

In 1958 Keyes was decorated by Generalissimo Francisco Franco, who awarded her the ribbon of the Order of Isabel the Catholic. She died in 1970, at the age of 84, in New Orleans.

== Louisiana and Mississippi Valley novels ==
The first of Keyes' novels set in Louisiana was Crescent Carnival, which tells the story of three generations of two intertwined families. The Breckenridges are Protestants, while the Fontaines are Catholic Louisiana Creoles, and the plot hinges on the way that pride and misfortune conspire with cultural and political differences to keep prospective lovers from marrying. The cycle of failure only ends with two people have the courage to defy the odds and accept their love for each other. Carnival celebrations—mostly Carnival balls, but also including Mardi Gras parades—form the backdrop of many scenes. An incident involving two Mardi Gras parades facing off when they nearly collide is based on a true story, as recorded by Robert Tallent in his book, Mardi Gras.

The River Road is set against the backdrop of an old family sugar plantation, and the d'Alvery family that struggles to keep it viable between the two world wars. The River Road is notable among Keyes' books for the tragic endings of two out of the three marriages chronicled in the novel. Most characters do not experience a 'happy ending'. In the UK, The River Road was published as two volumes, The River Road (Parts I-VI of the U.S. publication) and Vail d'Alvery (Parts VII-XI of the U.S. publication).

San Francisco Plantation House in 1938

Steamboat Gothic is a true Gothic novel set along Louisiana's famed River Road. The plantation home which inspired this novel is still in existence; it is called "San Francisco", with mid-Victorian architecture reminiscent of a steamboat. Set between 1865 and the Great Depression, Steamboat Gothic discusses the change in transportation methods from steamboat to railroad and the effect the change had upon the plantations along the River Road. In the UK, the novel was published in two volumes, Steamboat Gothic in 1952 and Larry Vincent in 1953. The first book covers a period from 1869 to 1895, and the second a period from 1897 to 1930. Eyre & Spottiswoode published both titles in the UK.

Mrs. Keyes also lived for a time in one of the plantations along the River Road. "The Cottage" was located north of the area known as Duncan's Point and was the setting for her novel, The River Road. "The Cottage" burned to the ground in the 1960s. However, the ruins of the place still remain.

Blue Camellia is set in the prairie country of South Louisiana and takes place on a rice farm. The protagonist and his wife are transplanted Midwesterners who arrive in Cajun country and see the Cajun culture through the eyes of outsiders.

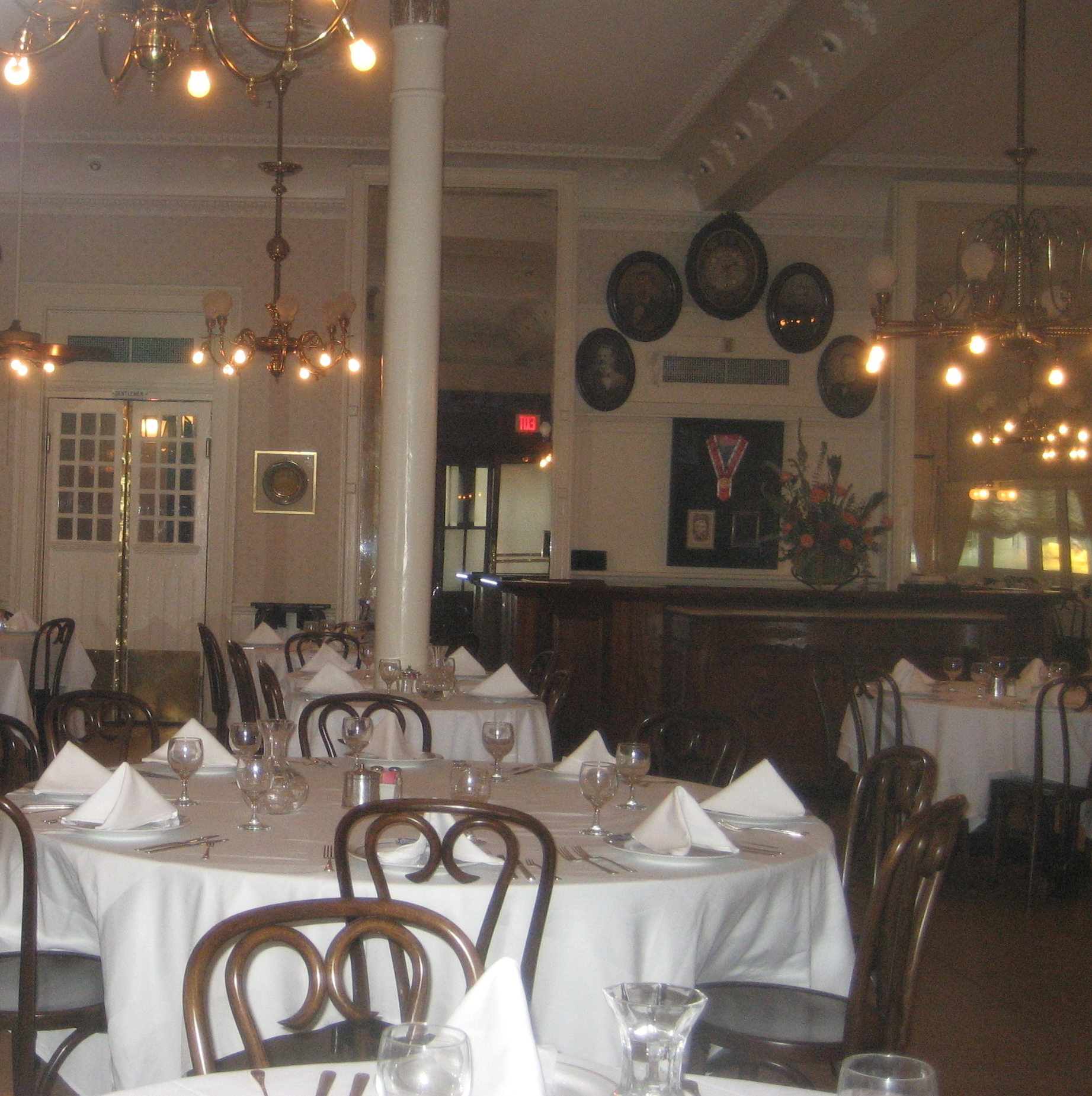
Dining room at Antoine's

The murder mystery Dinner at Antoine's, set in the immediate aftermath of World War II, became Keyes' biggest seller (and was also her only mystery, apart from the England-set The Royal Box, which has a few of the same characters). The plot is an interesting twist on the "Least Likely Person" concept of the murder mystery and is notable for "playing fair" with the reader; all the clues needed to solve the mystery are embedded in the novel. A subplot involving diplomatic and political manipulation made use of Keyes' experiences in Washington, D.C., as a Senator's wife.

Madame Castel's Lodger is a fictionalized biography of General P. G. T. Beauregard. Keyes' other Civil War novel is The Chess Players a highly fictionalized biography of Paul Morphy, the world chess champion who was born in New Orleans.

Keyes' Louisiana novels are loosely tied together by bits of common background that pop up in various books. Antoine's Restaurant appears at least briefly in all but Blue Camellia. General Beauregard also appears in each of the books set before 1900, and is mentioned in some way in all but one of the others (again, the exception is Blue Camellia). Paul Morphy is the lead character in The Chess Players and is discussed in several other books. A slightly ribald anecdote about a panicked Creole bride on her wedding night is told in The River Road and is mentioned in Once on Esplanade, Madame Castel's Lodger, The Chess Players and others. The Villere family are at center stage in Once on Esplanade and reappear (especially Madame Claiborne née Villere, Keyes' friend) in most of the other Louisiana books. The reader has the sense of a single, unified narrative world underlying the entire Louisiana set of novels.

Her Louisiana novels contained lengthy forewords or postscripts detailing her background research (including bibliographies) and listing the many people who provided her with information and/or inspiration.

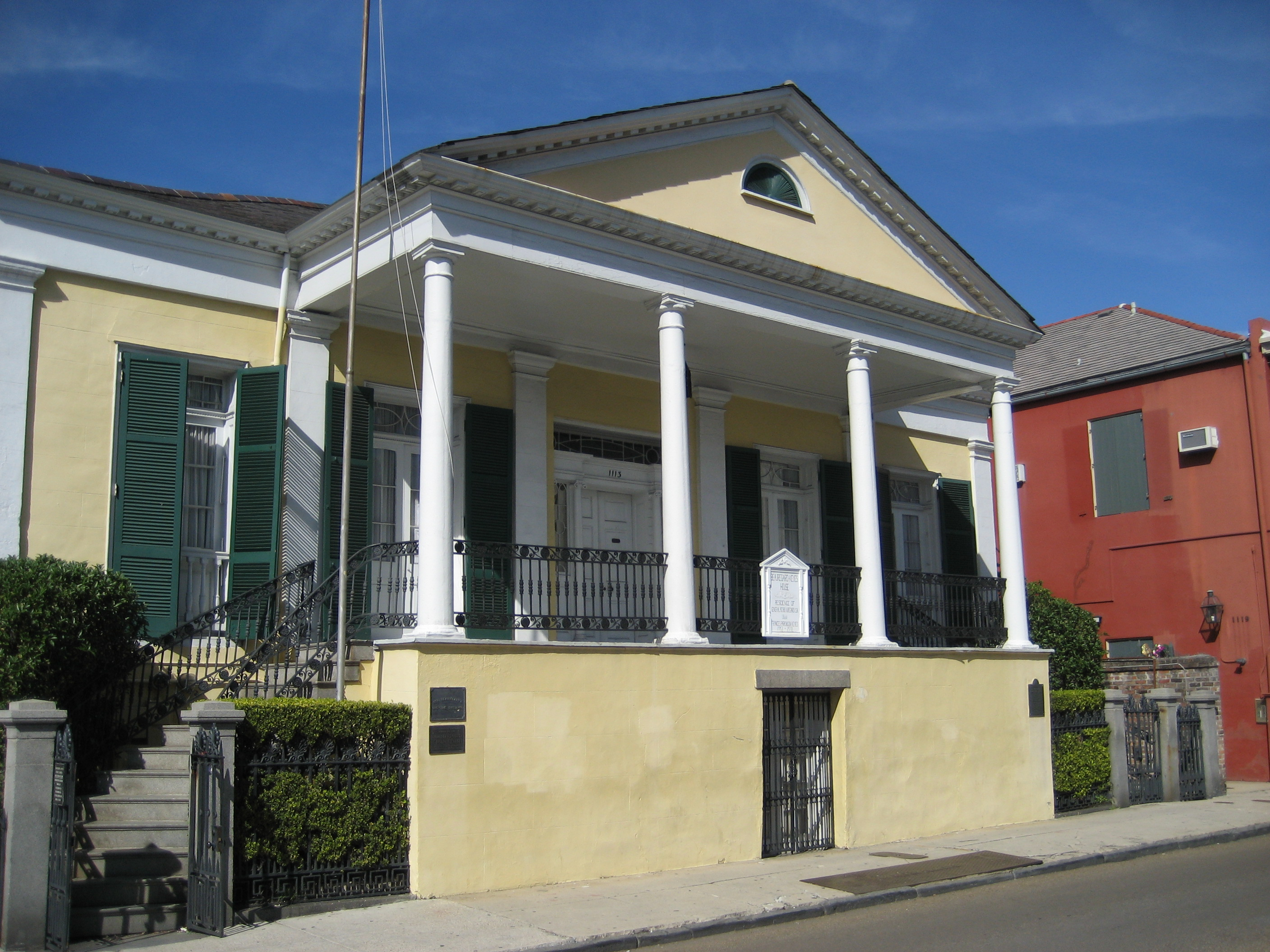
Beauregard-Keyes House

Her home in New Orleans, the Beauregard-Keyes House in the Vieux Carré, is now a museum. Confederate General P. G. T. Beauregard lived in but did not own it. Keyes restored the mansion to its Victorian glory, and her studio remains on display, complete with manuscripts. Now known as the Beauregard-Keyes House and Garden, the museum contains extensive Keyes correspondences, as well as her collections of dolls, fans, adult-sized costumes collected on her world travels and rare porcelain veilleuses, a kind of teapot in which the contents—anything from tea to milk—are kept warm by a small votive light. The veilleuse has the added bonus of serving as a nightlight and it was most commonly utilized at bedtime. Mrs. Keyes mentioned the use of a veilleuse in several of her novels. Her veilleuse collection was and is one of the most extensive in the world, second only to one in Trenton, Tennessee. Mrs. Keyes' doll collection was highlighted in a biographical documentary produced by Laurie McGill for the United Federation of Doll Clubs, Inc. (www.ufdc.org) entitled "Once Upon a Time: The Story of the Dixie Doll."

The Beauregard-Keyes house appeared none the worse for wear after Hurricane Katrina, but the structure suffered roof damage.

== Bibliography ==
Known works with original US publication dates (Louisiana / Mississippi Valley books) are marked with an asterisk*:

- The Old Gray Homestead (aka Sylvia Carey) (1919, novel)
- The Career of David Noble (1924, novel)
- Letters from a Senator's Wife (1924, memoirs)
- Queen Anne's Lace (1930, novel)
- Silver Seas and Golden Cities (1931, travelogue)
- Lady Blanche Farm: A Romance of the Commonplace (1931, novel)
- Senator Marlowe's Daughter (1933, novel) (aka Christian Marlowe's Daughter, UK)
- The Safe Bridge (1934, novel)
- The Happy Wanderer: The Collected Verse of Frances Parkinson Keyes (1935, poetry)
- Honor Bright (1936, novel)
- Written in Heaven: The Life on Earth of the Little Flower of Lisieux (1937, biography)
- Pioneering People in Northern New England: A Series of Early Sketches (1937, history)
- Capital Kaleidoscope: The Story of a Washington Hostess (1937, memoir)
- Parts Unknown (1938, novel)
- The Great Tradition (1939, novel)
- The Sublime Sheperdess: St. Bernadette Soubirous (1940, biography)
- Fielding's Folly (1940, novel)
- All That Glitters (1941, novel)
- Crescent Carnival (1942, novel - the first of the Louisiana books; aka If Ever I Cease To Love, UK)*
- Also the Hills (1943, novel)
- The River Road (1945, novel)*
- Came a Cavalier (1947, novel)
- Once on Esplanade: A Cycle Between Two Creole Weddings (1947, juvenile biography somewhat fictionalized)*
- Dinner at Antoine's (1948, novel, mystery)*
- Along A Little Way (1948, memoir and inspirational)
- The Cost of a Best Seller (1950, memoir and how-to book for aspiring writers)
- All This Is Louisiana: An Illustrated Story Book (1950, coffee-table photograph book)*
- Joy Street (1950, novel)
- St. Therese of Lisieux (aka Therese: Saint of a Little Way) (1950, biography)
- The Grace of Guadalupe (1951, biography)
- Steamboat Gothic (1952, novel)*
- The Ambassadress (1953, novel)
- Bernadette of Lourdes: Shepherdess, Sister and Saint, Julian Messner, Inc. (1953, biography of Bernadette Soubirous)
- The Royal Box (1954, novel, mystery)*
- The Frances Parkinson Keyes Cookbook (1955, cookbook)*
- St. Anne: Grandmother of Our Saviour (1955, biography)
- Blue Camellia (1957, novel)*
- Keeping Christmas (1957, inspirational)
- The Golden Slippers (aka Victorine) (1958, novel)*
- The Land of Stones and Saints, Doubleday & Co. Inc., New York City (1958, biography and history)
- Station Wagon In Spain (aka The Letter from Spain (1959, novel)
- Mother Cabrini (1959, biography)
- Christmas Gift (1960, inspirational)
- Roses in December (1960, memoir)
- The Chess Players: A Novel of New Orleans and Paris (1960, novel)*
- The Heritage (1960, novel)
- The Rose and the Lily: The Story of Two South American Saints (1961, biography)
- Shelter (1961?, novel?)
- Madame Castel's Lodger (1962, novel)*
- Three Ways to Love: The Story of Three Great Women (1963, juvenile biography)
- A Treasury of Favorite Poems (poetry anthology, edited) (1963)
- The Restless Lady and Other Stories (1963, short stories)
- The Explorer (1964, novel)
- Christmas Is Everywhere (1964, inspirational)
- Christmas At Home (1965, inspirational)
- Tongues of Fire: The Story of Christian Missionaries from St. Paul to the Present (1966, history)
- I, the King (1966, novel about Philip IV of Spain)
- All Flags Flying: Reminiscenses Of Frances Parkinson Keyes (1972, memoir)

== See also ==
- 1790 House (Woburn, Massachusetts)
