= Joy Street (novel) =

Book by Frances Parkinson Keyes

- First edition
- Author: Frances Parkinson Keyes
- Language: English
- Genre: Novel
- Publisher: Julian Messner (US) / Eyre and Spottiswoode (UK)
- Publication date: December 1, 1950
- Publication place: United States
- Media type: Print (hardcover)
- Pages: 490 pp

Joy Street is a 1950 novel by Frances Parkinson Keyes. Despite only being released on December 1, 1950, it was ranked as the second best-selling novel in the United States for 1950. Over two million copies were in print by the mid-1950s. It also topped the New York Times Best Seller list for eight weeks in 1951.

The novel is set in Boston and explores a married couple facing the elitist expectations and norms of Boston society. Kirkus Reviews described it as a "meticulously caparisoned romantic novel." William Darby's 1987 review of the popular literature of the 1950s describes the novel as "a characteristic woman's novel", which "unfolds at an excruciating pace."

The novel was also serialized in Good Housekeeping magazine in November and December 1950.

== Major characters ==
- Emily Thayer Field - the wife of Roger Field and a member of the prestigious Thayer family.
- Roger Field - a young Bostonian lawyer hired by the firm Roscoe, Cutter, and Mills.
- David Salomont - a Jewish lawyer hired by Roscoe, Cutter, and Mills. Falls in love with Emily. The first member of the firm to join into the American war effort in World War II.
- Brian Collins - an Irish lawyer hired by Roscoe, Cutter, and Mills. At first seems to be a nuisance but slowly becomes friends with Roger while entering into Bostonian politics. Though initially hesitant to enter into "Britain's war", he joins the war effort.
- Pellegrino "Pell" de Lucca - an Italian lawyer hired by Roscoe, Cutter, and Mills. Joins the American war effort in World War II.
- Evelina "Old Mrs." Forbes - Emily's grandmother. A rather important person in her granddaughter's life and in politics - being able to call President Roosevelt.
- Simonetta de Lucca - Pell's beloved and Carmella's daughter. Initially assumed to be his cousin until this is disproven by Roger.
- Carmella de Lucca - Pell's adoptive mother, a deeply religious and bitter woman. Revealed to only be distantly related to Pell near the end of Part 4.
- Priscilla Thayer - Emily's cousin, a somewhat vain and annoying woman whom is helped to enter into Bostonian society by Emily.
