= Beauregard-Keyes House =

- BK Historic House and Gardens
- U.S. National Register of Historic Places
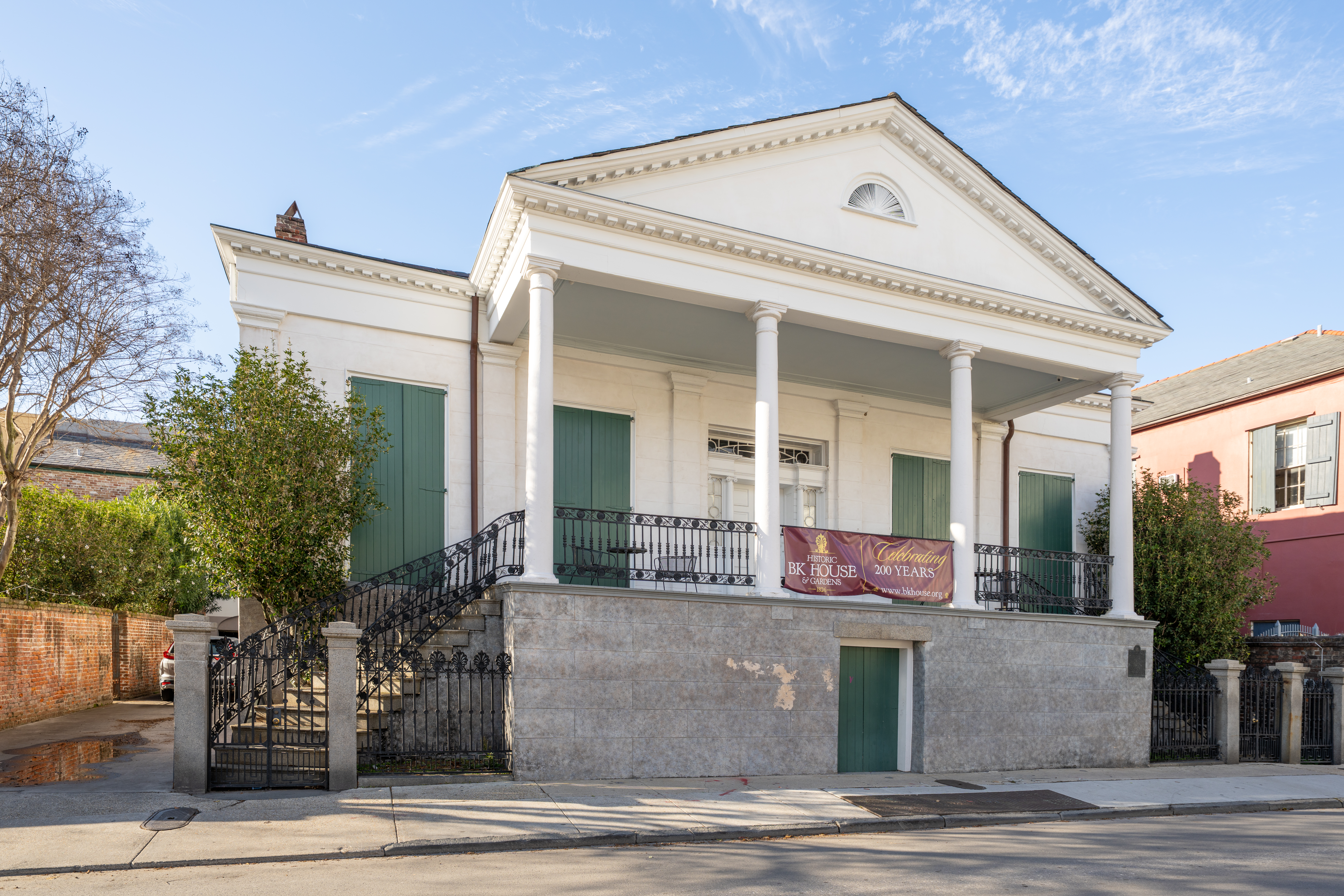

- Location within Louisiana
- Location: 1113 Chartres St., New Orleans, Louisiana
- Coordinates: 29°57′39″N 90°3′40″W
- Built: 1826
- Architectural style: Greek Revival
- NRHP reference No.: 75000853
- Added to NRHP: November 20, 1975

The Beauregard-Keyes House is a historic residence located at 1113 Chartres Street in the French Quarter, New Orleans, Louisiana. It is currently a museum, the BK Historic House and Gardens, that focuses on the past residents and associates of the house, notably the Confederate general P. G. T. Beauregard. These include its wealthy, pre-civil war French Creole inhabitants, the people they enslaved, the Italian immigrant families who moved in after the civil war, their tenants, and American author Frances Parkinson Keyes.

== History ==
The property where the house would be built was originally owned by Ursuline nuns, who sold off parcels of their land in 1825. The home was designed by François Correjolles and built by James Lambert in 1826 for auctioneer Joseph LeCarpentier. In his design, Correjolles combined elements of a Creole cottage with Greek Revival features, including a Palladian façade. In particular, he used Creole forms in the interior and on the rear elevation, as well as a cabinet gallery and detached outbuildings, but maintaining the American tradition of a central hall. Consul of Switzerland John A. Merle became the owner in 1833 and his wife, Anais Philippon, added the adjoining garden.

=== Beauregard ===
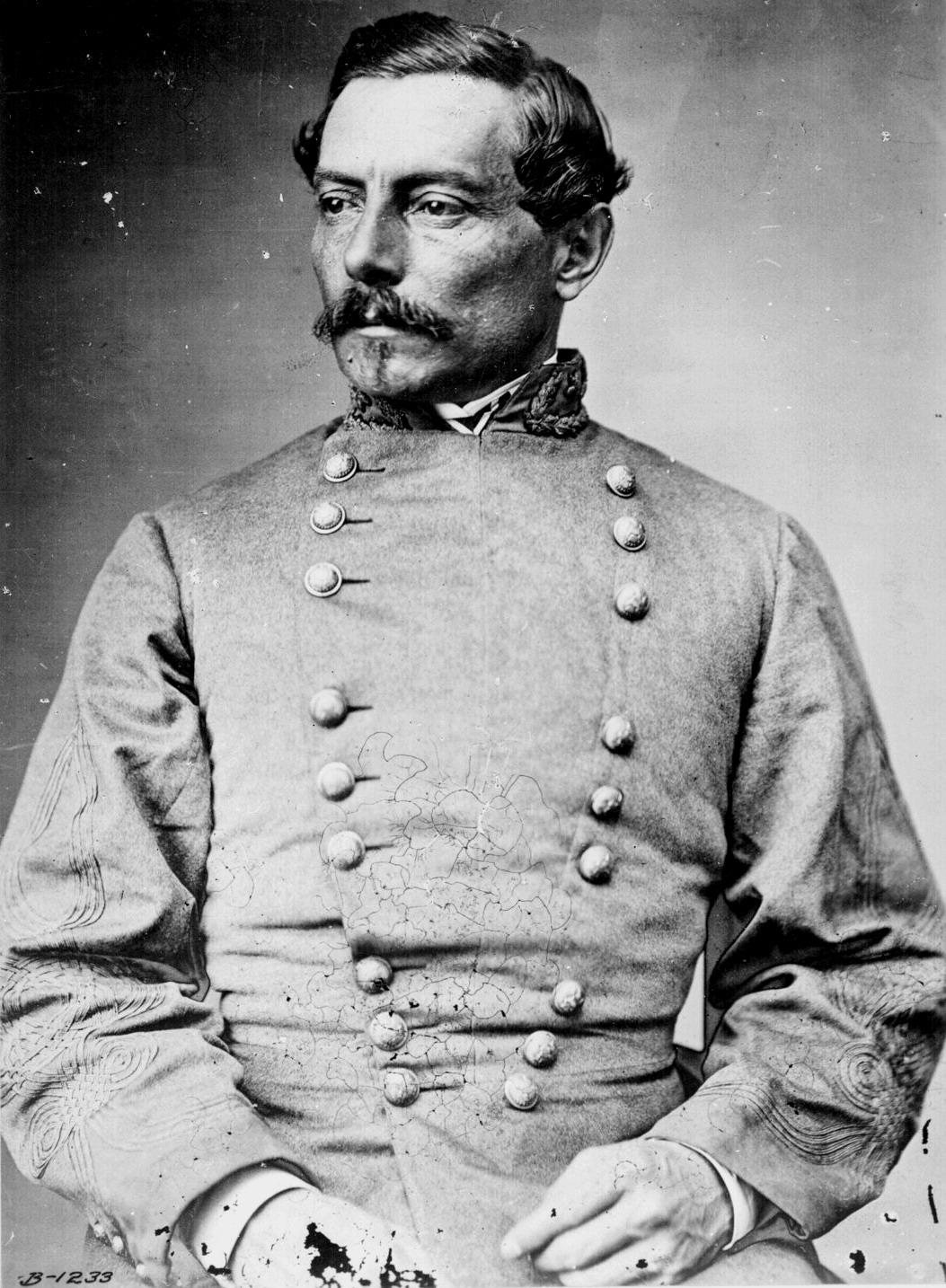
Beauregard

By 1865, the home was purchased by a local grocer named Dominique Lanata, who rented it out until 1904. His first tenants were the Beauregards. Pierre Gustave Toutant Beauregard married his second wife, Caroline Deslonde, in 1860. Caroline was the daughter of André Deslonde, a sugar planter from St. James Parish. The newlyweds honeymooned briefly in the house. Mrs. Beauregard died in 1864.

After the American Civil War, Beauregard returned to 1113 Chartres Street and lived in the house from 1866 to 1868. He then moved with his son René and a widowed older sister to a home at 934 Royal Street, where he lived until 1875.

In 1925, a new owner of the house wanted to tear it down to erect factories. Local women formed the Beauregard Memorial Association to preserve the home, though the garden could not be saved.

=== Keyes ===
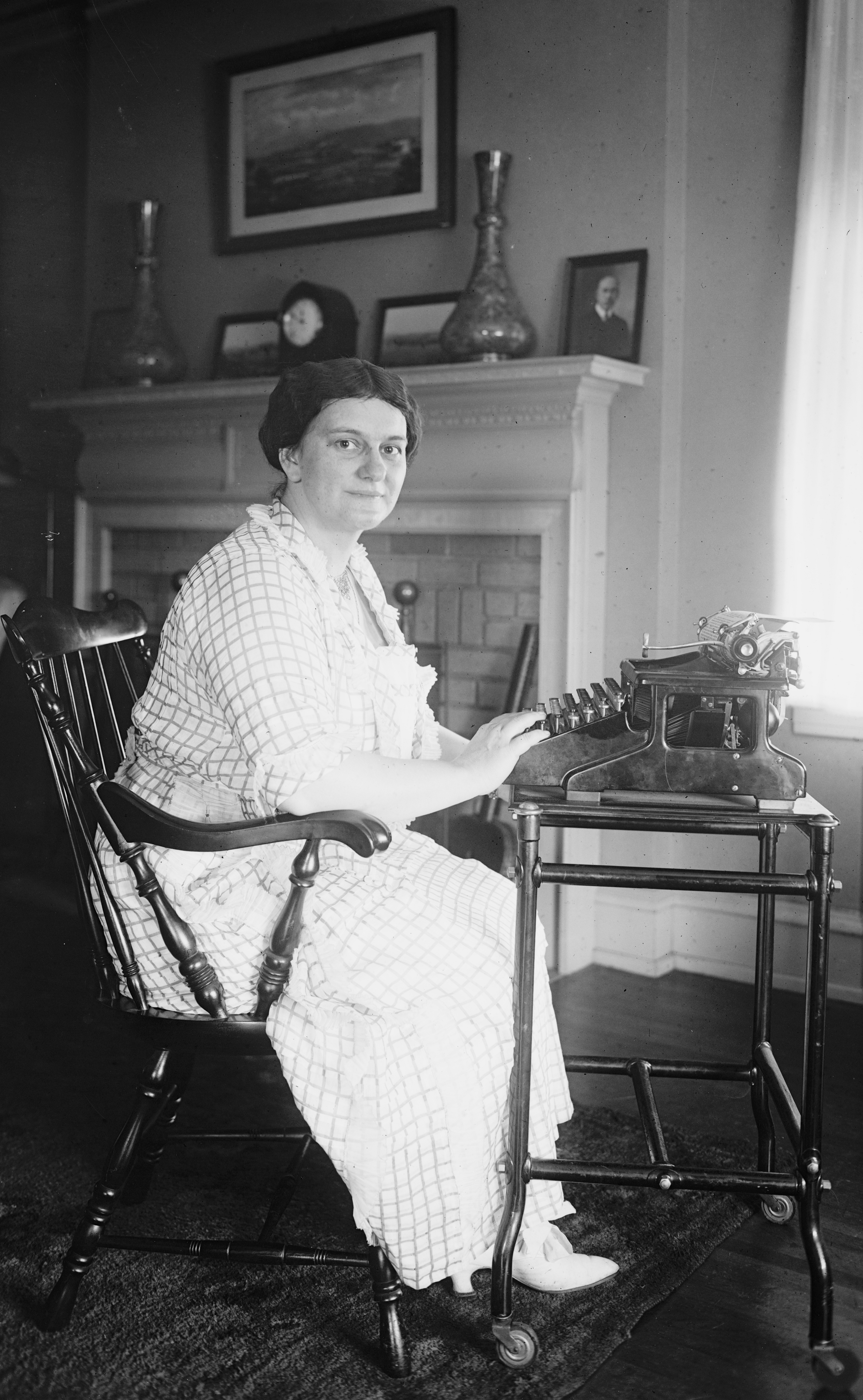
Keyes

American author Frances Parkinson Keyes purchased the house at 1113 Chartres Street and made it her residence. While living at the house, Keyes wrote numerous books, one of which was set in the house and included Beauregard as a character: Madame Castel's Lodger. The 1962 novel explored Beauregard's emotional struggles as a twice-widowed Civil War veteran who refused to take the loyalty oath to the Union. She also wrote a novel called The Chess Players, based on chess champion Paul Morphy, who was also the grandson of the original owner of the house, LeCarpentier.

== Modern history ==
Keyes began the restoration work on the house as early as 1945 when she hired architect Richard Koch to begin work. She also worked with a local group called the Garden Study Club to replant the garden to its 1830s–1860s look and rebuild the brick wall surrounding it. The Orleans Parish Landmarks Commission installed a bronze plaque identifying the home's history in 1958.

Today, the Beauregard-Keyes house is restored to its Victorian style and showcases items from Beauregard's family, as well as Keyes's studio and her collections of dolls and rare porcelain veilleuses (tea pots). Keyes wrote several articles about her doll collection for magazines and books. A film, "The Story of the Dixie Doll," produced by Laurie W. McGill (www.UFDC.org) discusses not only Keyes' life and books, but her dolls. The house is open for tours.

The house also hosts the Nous Foundation, a cultural institution promoting Louisiana’s French and Creole-speaking cultures.

In AMC's Interview With The Vampire, scenes set at the Fair Play Saloon/Azalea Hall were shot in the house, which was "completely transformed" for the TV series.

== Images of the building ==
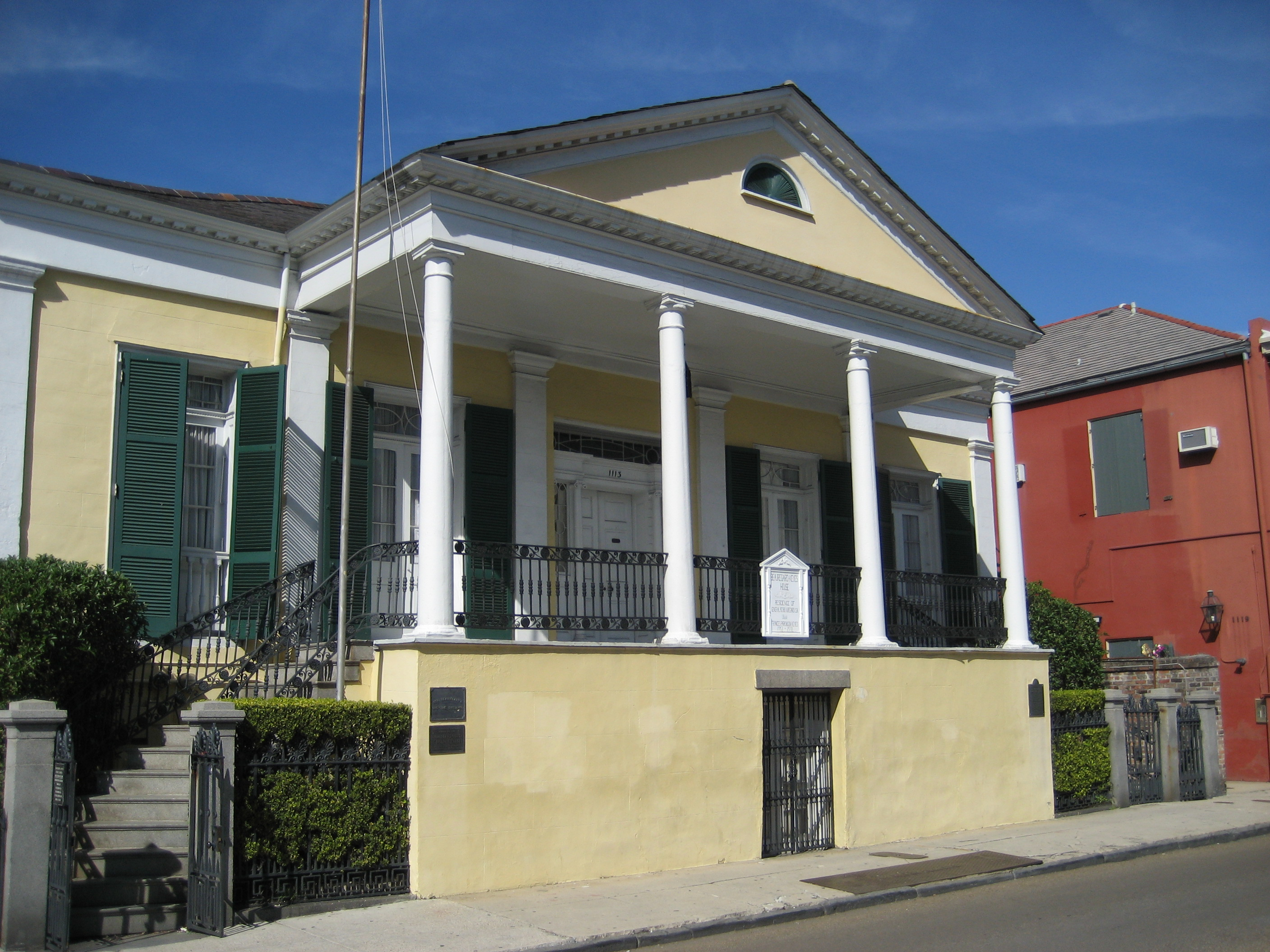
The Beauregard-Keyes House today

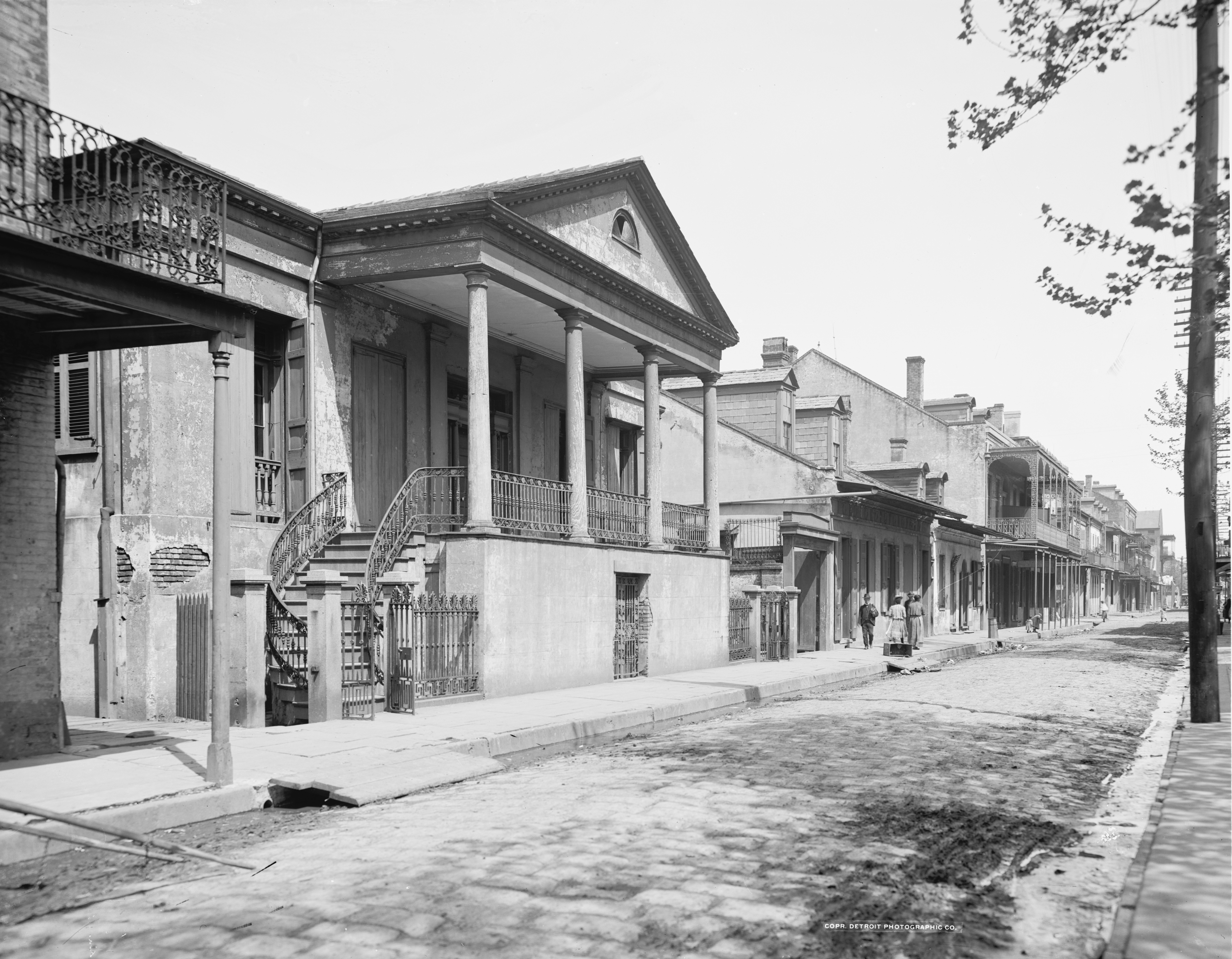
The house in the early 1900s

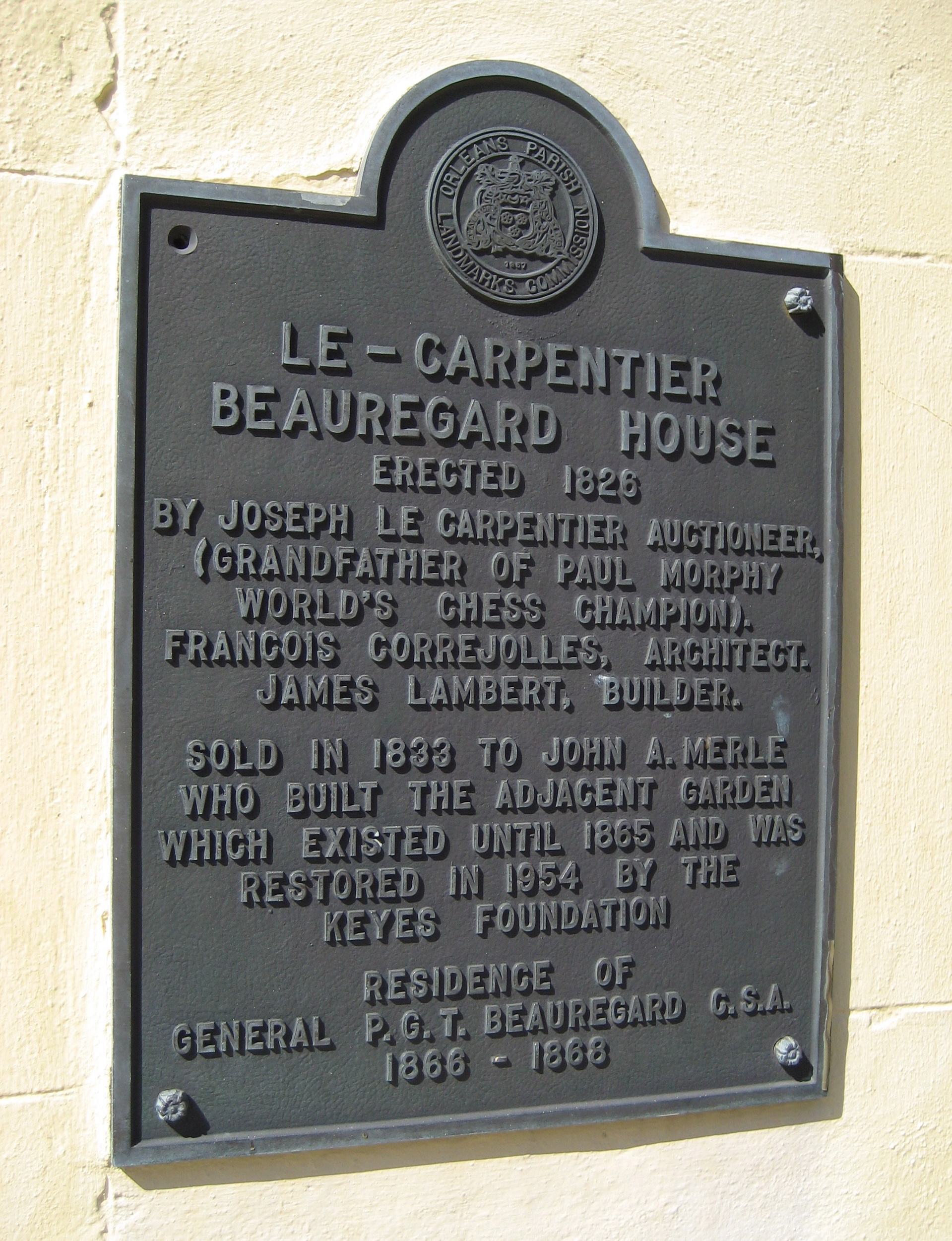
Plaque

== See also ==
- National Register of Historic Places listings in Orleans Parish, Louisiana
