= Mortis =

Mortis may refer to:

== In fiction ==
- Mortis (BanG Dream!), in the 2010s musical manga franchise
- Mortis (Star Wars), a 2011 fictional planet
- Lois London, or Mortis, a 1983 Marvel Comics supervillian

== Other uses ==
- Mortis (food), an Elizabethan-era pâté
- Chris Kanyon (1970–2010), American wrestler (ring name: Mortis)
- "(Mortis)", by Kasabian on their 2014 album 48:13

== See also ==
- Mortise (disambiguation)
- Mortiis, a Norwegian band
- Algor mortis
- Lacus Mortis, on the Moon
- Livor mortis
- Pallor mortis
- Rigor mortis (disambiguation)
