= Rigor (disambiguation) =

Rigour or rigor describes a condition of stiffness or strictness.

It may also refer to:

== Biology ==
- Rigor (medicine), or chills
- Rigor mortis, a stage of death

== Other uses ==
- Cognitive rigor, in education
- Rigor Dimaguiba, protagonist of Philippine TV series Batang Quiapo

== See also ==
- Rigor mortis (disambiguation)
- Academic honesty
- Intellectual honesty
- Mathematical proof
- Pedantry
