= Stages of human death =

Seven stages that occur after a human being dies

The stages of death of a human being have medical, biochemical and legal aspects. The term taphonomy from palaeontology applies to the fate of all kinds of remains of organisms. Forensic taphonomy is concerned with remains of the human body.

== History ==
The academic study of death is called thanatology, a field pioneered by Élie Metchnikoff in the early 20th century. Thanatology focuses on describing postmortem bodily modifications, as well as perspectives concerning psychosocial, medical, ethical, and spiritual aspects of death.

== Definition of death ==
Prior to the 1980s, the legal standard defined death as the absence of cardiopulmonary function including the loss of all vital signs. However, as medical technology advanced, there were situations where one might lose brain function and maintain cardiopulmonary function. This led the American Medical Association, the American Bar Association in collaboration with the National Conference of Commissioners on Uniform State Laws to come together in the 1980s to expand the definition of death through the Uniform Determination of Death Act (UDDA). Under this law, death can be defined as the loss of cardiopulmonary function or the loss of brain function including the brainstem and cortex.

== Clinical signs and stages of death ==
Signs of death or strong indications that a human is no longer alive are:

- Respiratory arrest (no breathing)
- Cardiac arrest (no pulse)
- Brain death (no neuronal activity)

The heart and lungs are vital organs for human life due to their ability to properly oxygenate human blood (lungs) and distribute this blood to all vital organs (heart). Hence, failure of the heart to pump blood or the lungs to obtain oxygen can lead to a cardiopulmonary death where the heart stops pumping and there is no pulse. In the brain, this can be manifested by a hypoxic state which leads to cerebral edema and thus an increase in intracranial pressure. The rise in intracranial pressure can lead to further disruption in cerebral blood flow, leading to necrosis or tissue death. The aforementioned mechanism is the most common cause of brain death; however, this increase in intracranial pressure does not always occur due to an arrest in cardiopulmonary function. Traumatic brain injuries and subarachnoid hemorrhages can also increase the intracranial pressure in the brain leading to a cessation of brain function and hence death. While cardiopulmonary death can be easily assessed by looking for the presence of a pulse, or identifying electrical activity through EKG tracings, assessment of brain death is slightly more nuanced. Per the United Kingdom Medical Royal Colleges, a diagnosis of brain death is a two-fold process including 1) identifying the cause of irreversible brain damage and excluding reversible causes of brain damage and 2) conducting a series of clinical and laboratory tests to assess brain stem function.

The definition of legal death, and its formal documentation in a death certificate, varies according to the jurisdiction. The certification applies to somatic death, corresponding to death of the person, which has varying definitions but most commonly describes a lack of vital signs and brain function. Death at the level of cells, called molecular death or cell death, follows a matter of hours later. These distinctions, and the independence of physicians certifying legal death, are significant in organ procurement.

== Post-mortem changes ==
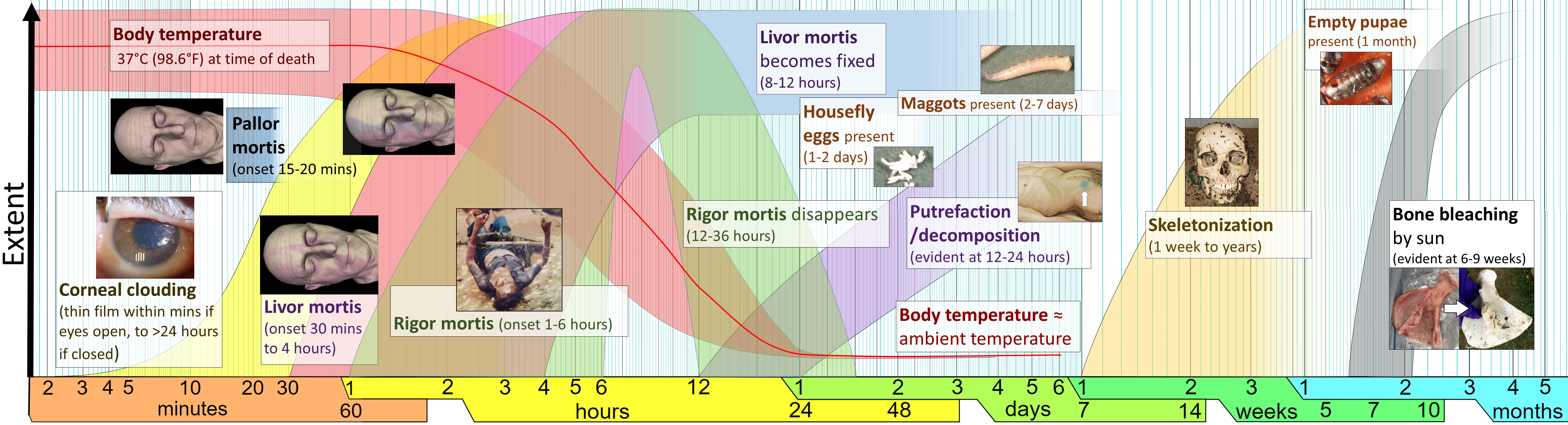
Timeline of postmortem changes (stages of death).

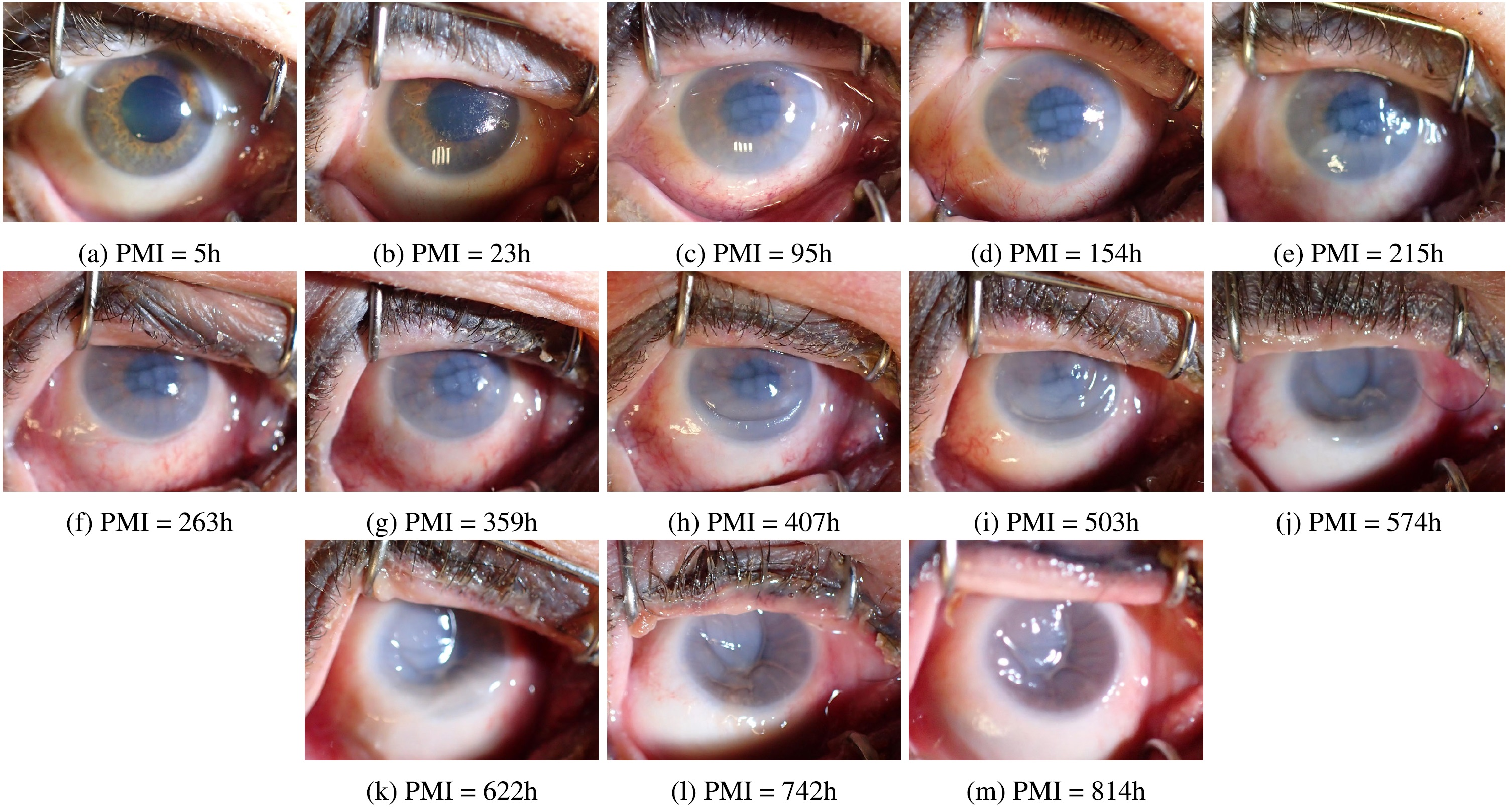
An example of postmortem corneal opacity.

Post-mortem changes refer to the series of changes that occur to a body after death. These changes can generally be divided between early post-mortem changes and late post-mortem changes (also known as decomposition). These changes occur along a continuum and can be helpful in determining the post-mortem interval, which is the time between death and examination.

The stages that follow shortly after death are:

- Corneal opacity, "clouding" in the eyes
- Pallor mortis, paleness which happens in the first 15–120 minutes after death
- Livor mortis, or dependent lividity, a settling of the blood in the lower (dependent) portion of the body
- Algor mortis, the reduction in body temperature following death. This is generally a steady decline until matching ambient temperature
- Rigor mortis, the limbs of the corpse becoming stiff (Latin rigor) and difficult to move or manipulate
- Putrefaction, the beginning signs of decomposition

Of these, with obvious mortal damage to the body, the textbook conclusive signs of death clear to a lay person are: algor mortis, rigor mortis, livor mortis, and putrefaction.

The cardinal signs of death may refer to the ending of breathing, heartbeat and circulation, or to algor mortis, livor mortis and rigor mortis; the adoption of brain death as a definition has lessened the centrality of these signs. In a clearer contemporary terminology, algor mortis, livor mortis and rigor mortis are called "early postmortem" changes, in distinction from the "immediate postmortem" changes associated with the cessation of bodily functions, as indicated by vital signs. With an ophthalmoscope, changes to the blood in the retina are quickly visible.

Those stages are followed, in taphonomy, by

- Decomposition, the reduction into simpler forms of matter, accompanied by a strong, unpleasant odor.
- Skeletonization, the end of decomposition, where all soft tissues have decomposed, leaving only the skeleton.
- Fossilization, the natural preservation of the skeletal remains formed over a very long period. This stage may not occur, depending on the circumstances and the conditions of the surrounding environment.

=== Decomposition stages ===
Descriptions of decomposition have had varying numbers of discrete stages. A 5-stage process developed by Galloway and colleagues that is commonly used in forensic pathology is detailed below:

- Stage 1: Fresh – about half of bodies show signs of lividity and no signs of insects.
- Stage 2: Early decomposition – Bacteria grow throughout the body, releasing gases, including putrescine and cadaverine which turn into bloating and cause an unpleasant odor.
- Stage 3: Advanced decomposition – This stage brings further discoloration to the body. The gases from bacterial decay begin to escape, causing a strong odor.
- Stage 4: Skeletonization – The internal organs liquefy and the body begins to dry out.
- Stage 5: Extreme decomposition – Advancing of the skeletonization with bleaching, exfoliation, and loss of wide portions of long bone.

== Post-mortem interval ==
The post-mortem interval (PMI) is also called the time since death. It is the time lapse between death and discovery. After death, decomposition occurs. Decomposition includes physical, chemical, and biological changes.

Below are some of the biochemical changes that happen during decomposition which can help estimate the time since death (keeping in mind that there is variation between species).

=== Macroscopic changes ===
- body cooling (body temperature decreases)
- rigor mortis
- livor mortis or hypostasis (gravity causes blood to pool)

=== Microscopic changes ===
==== Early after death ====
- cellular autolysis (with loss of cell adhesions)
- morphologic changes in WBCs
- changes in blood glucose
- changes in electrolyte concentrations
- changes in enzyme activities

=== Biological methods for estimation of the early PMI ===
==== Applied techniques in veterinary medicine ====
Techniques in veterinary medicine help estimate how long since bodies in animals have been dead.

- In pigs, the decrease in body temperature occurs in the eyeball, orbit soft tissue, rectum, and muscle tissue. Up to 13 hours after death, eyeball cooling in pigs provides a reasonable estimate of time since death. After 13 hours, muscle and rectal temperatures in pigs are better estimates of time since death.
- In dogs, the eye K+ decreases from 1.5 to seven hours after death. Rigor mortis of hindlimbs may persist up to 24 hours, and elbow rigidity is lost after three to seven days.

Tissue autolysis may also be used to measure the PMI.

- In rat livers, hepatocyte nuclear chromatin condense over 6 hours of autolysis after death. Hepatocytes individualize over 6 hours after death.
- In canine livers, the bile duct epithelium detaches from the basement membrane after 3 days. Hepatocyte nuclei autolyze by 7 days.
- In equine livers, autolysis can occur as early as 1 hour after death. Autolysis progresses over 72 hours.

== See also ==
- Suspended animation
- Lazarus syndrome
- Cadaveric spasm
