= Transient evidence =

Type of physical evidence

Transient evidence is term used in criminal forensics to indicate elements of physical evidence that might be expected to degrade or disappear within a particular time frame. As such, it is one of the five primary categories of physical evidence codified in Legal Medicine by the American College of Legal Medicine, along with conditional evidence, pattern evidence, transfer evidence and associative evidence. While, in a sense, many types of evidence degrade with the passage of time (such as witness recollections, a victim's clothing, etc.), the term is specific to factors with an inherently limited period of existence. A bloodstain itself is not transient evidence, despite its mutable nature. The condition and appearance of that bloodstain at a given point of time would, however, be transient evidence.

== Transient medical evidence ==
Transient evidence is frequently relied upon in the determination of time of death. The condition of rigor mortis begins to manifest after about 3 hours after death, and lasts about 72 hours. It then disappears as proteolytic enzymes from lysosomes break down the stiffness of the corpse. The reduction in internal temperature after death, a process known as algor mortis, can also be used to estimate demise.

Another noteworthy transient condition is livor mortis, the purplish pooling of blood within the body after the heart has stopped beating. Emergency responders are instructed to recognize it as a sign that CPR should not be attempted. Investigators may use it to determine if a body has been moved or repositioned after death. Livor mortis starts 20 minutes to 3 hours after death and is congealed in the capillaries in 4 to 5 hours. Maximum lividity occurs within 6–12 hours.

By far, the most commonly documented transient medical evidence is blood alcohol level. Since the development of accurate portable breathalyzer technology, the determination of illegal intoxication has become a matter of field forensics.

== Transient environmental evidence ==
Certain aspects of a crime scene may manifest themselves only for brief periods. For instance, the distinctive smoke and odor an incendiary device emits may be evident only within the first few minutes. Those arriving on the scene later, when the blaze is fully fueled by the structure itself, might perceive no indicators of suspicious origin, and indeed might not search for such a device among the debris.

Other examples include: the heat of a gun barrel, indicating it had been recently fired. The color of a bloodstain, indicating its freshness. The absence of transient environmental evidence can also be evidentiary, as in the case of odors associated with decomposition. If a skeletal body is found within the confines of a frequented space (such as in a closet in a public bar), the fact that no one complained about the smell during putrefaction is a strong indicator that the body has been relocated.

== Transient contextual evidence ==
Not all scenes can remain preserved during the course of an investigation. A vehicular incident, for example, must often be quickly cleared from the road. An exterior scene can be promptly compromised by weather. Sometimes aspects of the scene are intentionally destroyed in the process of investigation: one might, for instance, break down a locked door to discover what is on the other side, destroying a pattern of blood spatters on the door in the process.

In all such instances, the advent of photography has become invaluable. Immediate and extensive photographing of a scene is often the only means of preserving transient contextual evidence, which is why photographic documentation, in standard protocol, takes precedence to all other steps of investigation (subsequent to securing the scene). Investigators are encouraged "to not hesitate to photograph something which has no apparent significance at that time - it may later prove to be a key element in the investigation." .
