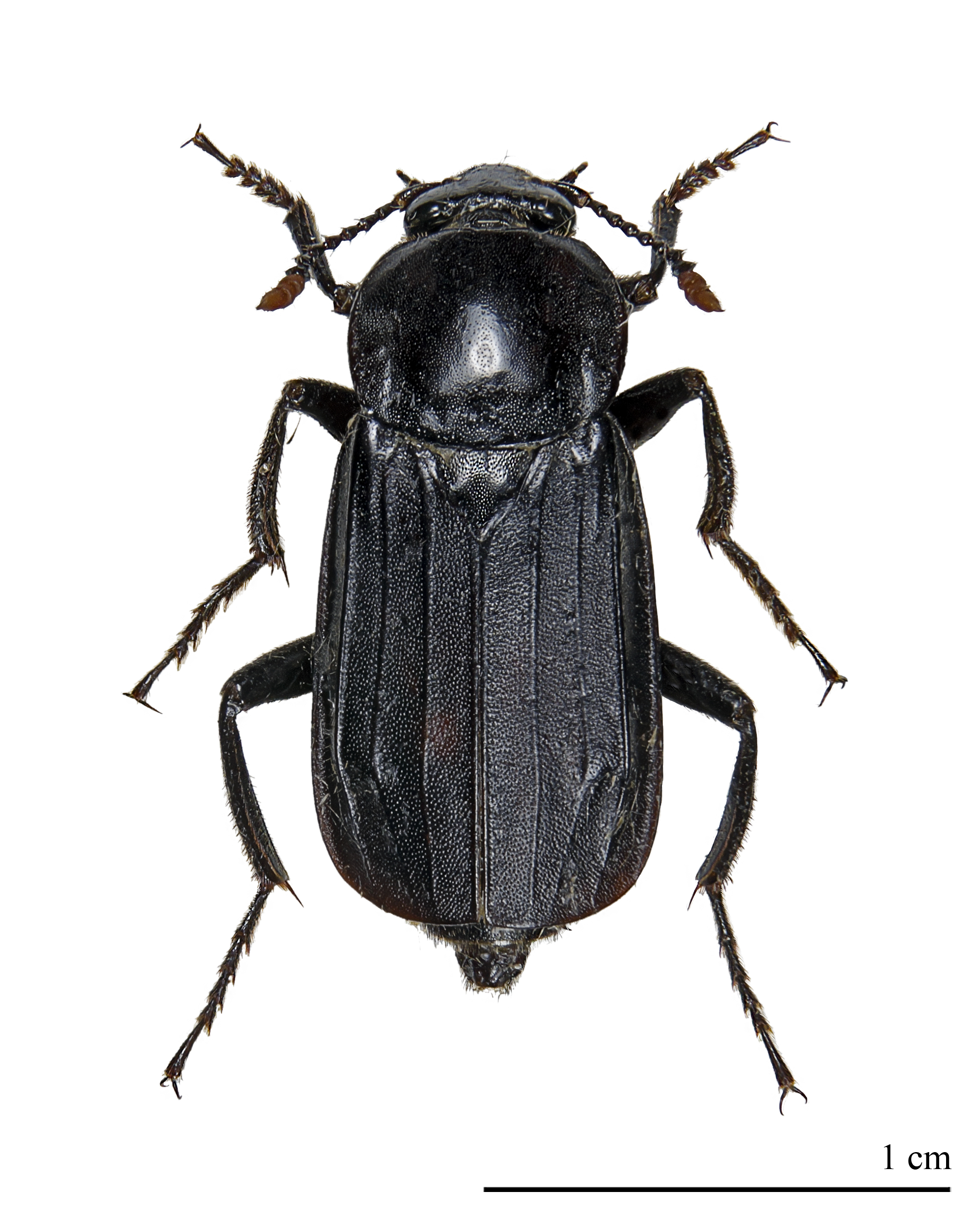

Scientific classification
- Kingdom: Animalia
- Phylum: Arthropoda
- Clade: Pancrustacea
- Class: Insecta
- Order: Coleoptera
- Suborder: Polyphaga
- Infraorder: Staphyliniformia
- Family: Staphylinidae
- Genus: Necrodes
- Species: N. littoralis

Binomial name
- Necrodes littoralis (Linnaeus, 1758)

Synonyms
- Silpha littoralis Linnaeus, 1758

= Necrodes littoralis =

Species of beetle

Necrodes littoralis, also known as the shore sexton beetle, is a species of carrion beetle of the genus Necrodes, found in countries across Europe. As a carrion beetle, it feeds on decaying vertebrate remains and maggots. This species' feeding behaviors make it an important asset to forensic entomology.

== Description ==
Adults of N. littoralis grow to be 15 to 25 mm (0.59 to 0.98 in) long and have a shiny black body. The beetles can be identified by a characteristic bump about three quarters down the length of their elytra, a hardened forewing that act as armor to protect the beetle from environmental factors and predators. Beetles of the order Coleoptera, like N. littoralis, have truncated elytra. The reason why some beetle species have adapted a shortened protection armor is unclear. The larvae of N. littoralis are campodeiform, meaning they have a flattened body, antennae, and have well-developed legs.

== Distribution ==
N. littoralis has a Palearctic distribution, but most observations are reported across Europe. They have been observed in Austria, Hungary, Slovakia, Czech Republic, Belgium, France, and England. Outside of Europe, N. littoralis has been observed in South Korea.

== Etymology ==
The Latin prefix necr- denotes corpse, and the Latin word littoralis denotes a coastal environment, which can be misleading given that the beetles are not found solely by the coast. In fact, the beetles are mostly seen in woody areas or fields.

== Habitat ==
Adult beetles and larvae are primarily found on large carrion in the late stages of decomposition. Further, the carrion is primarily found outdoors. However, there have been observations of N.littoralis on carrion that are indoors. Researchers hypothesize that the beetles have difficulty accessing decaying bodies indoors as they cannot easily detect openings in buildings.

Researchers from Italy reported the presence of N. littoralis on a human corpse in Italy for the first time in 2021. The decomposition conditions of the corpse at the time of discovery align with the consensus that the beetles inhabit corpses at later stages of decomposition. The corpse was found indoors, which the researchers explain that "the access to the building through the open door and the state of total neglect of the area where the corpse was found ... may have favored the indoor colonization by N. littoralis."

== Social behavior ==
Studies were conducted to elucidate the benefits of the aggregation behavior adopted by N. littoralis. Data on mortality, rate of growth, size was collected to for adults raised individually and compared to results obtained from beetles reared in aggregations. Scientists discovered that aggregations amongst larvae especially led to decreased development time, reduced mortality, and these beetles even grew to be larger. Temperature was a confounding variable that influenced these results as well. Lower temperatures of approximately 16 °C (61 °F) was the ideal condition to observe the greatest results from aggregative behavior. Larvae adjust for fluctuations in temperature by moving to other locations or raising the temperature within feeding aggregations. Group living has its benefits for these beetles because it makes foraging easier and creates a stronger defense against predators. These behaviors are important to understand because they impact N. littoralis's capacity to survival and develop.

== Life cycle ==
Mating of adult beetles typically occurs at night. Following mating, the female lays eggs in the ground near the carrion. Although there is variation in the exact number, females lay between 50 and 70 eggs at a time. Researchers who studied the instar development of N. littorialis explain that the beetles have three larval stages. Another study reveals that the three larval stages are first instar, second instar, and third instar.

Post-feeding larva, nymph, and imago are parts of the developmental stage of larvae into adult beetles. The first instar larvae are creamy white when they hatch and shift toward the carrion for food. First instar larvae are the most vulnerable. The second and third instar larvae are also creamy white after ecdysis, which is the process of insects shedding their exoskeleton. As part of the transition from third star larvae to post-feeding larvae, the third star larvae burrow into the ground and form pupal chambers "thrashing the abdomen and thus compacting the soil around them. They go through the prepupal, pupal, and teneral adult stages inside the chambers." The beetles emerge from the pupal chamber after "they become fully sclerotized and colored."

=== Larvae behavior ===
The larvae of N. littoralis aggregate, as they form large and orderly groups of larvae on the carrion. In these large groups, the larvae feed on the carrion. Researchers who are interested in exploring why the beetle larvae group for feeding performed an experiment to test the "importance of thermal cues and ground-deposited chemical cues for the aggregation behavior..." The experiment involved field data and lab tests. The field data consisted of analyzing the larvae growth results of previous experiments with pig carcasses. The lab tests involved collecting adult beetles, allowing one male to mate with one female, allowing the larvae to grow, and placing them on a sample carcass set-up to observe aggregation behavior. The study found that N. littoralis larvae formed aggregations around a heat source of the carrion, which demonstrates the importance of stable thermal conditions for the larval aggregations.

The experiment also found that if the heat source moved, the larvae aggregations followed by disassembling and forming a new aggregation around the new heat source. Stable thermal conditions are important for the development of the larvae into adult beetles. Notably, larvae in the later stages of development, specifically third instar larva, prefer to aggregate in cooler temperatures. The authors hypothesized that this preference allows the larvae to grow larger, though this growth happens more slowly. The third instar larva phase begins the transition to the post-feeding phase, which is when the largest larvae were observed in another study. Additionally, the aggregations form around parts of the carrion that are favorable for feeding. The data from the experiments did not support the ground-deposited chemical cues as an important motivation for aggregation behavior.

=== Adult behavior ===
Adult N. littoralis are most active during the spring and summer months. Adult beetles on carrion feed on the decaying tissues, but mostly consume Diptera larvae, which is the larvae of flies, especially blow flies.

Adult N. littoralis are hypothesized to perform indirect parental care for their larvae by spreading "anal exudates" on the carrion, which produces heat on the carrion and helps direct the location of larvae aggregation to an area with suitable temperatures.

=== Relationship to Volatile Organic Compounds (VOCs) ===
Necrodes littoralis and other necrophages are attracted to carrions by cadaveric volatile organic compounds (VOCs), which are gases emitted into the air by the carrion. Minimal information is known about the VOCs of cadavers at late stages of decomposition that attract beetles like N. littoralis.

To find out about the VOCs that attract N. littoralis, researchers tested the response of the beetles to different VOCs. The VOCs tested were "benzyl butyrate, butan-1-ol, butyric acid, cadaverine, dimethyl disulfide, dimethyl trisulfide, indole, phenol, putrescine and skatole" The list of VOCs tested included VOCs released in the late decomposition stages to account for the beetle's timing of habitation. The study found that there was not a positive and significant attraction of N. littoralis to the listed VOCs. The main limitation of the study was the low quantity of VOCs and replicates used in the experiment. Ultimately, this study did not resolve the mystery of which VOCs N. littoralis are attracted to. However, the researchers did observe that adult beetles began to inhabit the carrion around the time the carrion started bloating. Bloating of a carrion results from accumulation of gases released by decomposition. The researchers explain that future studies should focus on identifying the gases that cause bloating to narrow down the possible VOCs that attract N. littoralis to carrions.

== Competition ==
N. littoralis are not the only insects that inhabit large carrion. The other most common inhabitant of carrion is flies, specifically blow flies (Calliphoridae). It is understood that both beetles and blowflies help decompose bodies, but researchers in Poland were interested in the competitive aspect of the N. littoralis and blow fly interactions and thus conducted a study to investigate this. Blow flies inhabit the carrion soon after death whereas the beetles inhabit the carrion much later after death, closer to the time of the body bloating.

Despite these timing differences, the two insects share similarities in their interactions with the carrion. For example, larvae of both insects form aggregations while they feed on the carrion. The authors of the previously mentioned study explain that "similarities in carrion utilization prompted us to hypothesize that blow flies and Necrodes beetles compete over large carrion." The authors hypothesized that the blow flies would have access to the best territory on the carrion since they arrive first and the beetles would choose the remaining available areas of the carrion. This hypothesis was tested by evaluating experiment results of a previous study involving pig carcasses.

Another hypothesis proposed by the authors of the aforementioned study was that the beetles "compete with blow flies by killing the larvae that are prior on in their peak feeding phase [...] These predictions were tested in behavioral laboratory assays." The primary result of the study was that the blow flies and the beetles have a competitive relationship. This was made evident by the observation that flies reduce the available area of feeding on the carrion for the beetles, which is an indirect effect on the beetles, and that the beetles directly affect the flies by consuming the fly larvae. Interestingly, the beetles kill the fly larvae that are the youngest and smallest, indicating that consuming fly larvae is not a strategy to eat more food, but a strategy to reduce the competition over the carrion.

== Relevance to forensic entomology ==
N. littoralis are useful forensic entomologists as analysis of their behaviors and growth can reveal evidence in death cases. Post-mortem interval (PMI) is a measurement used to identify how long a body has been dead. PMI can be determined by creating a developmental model of the activity of carrion beetles, like N. littoralis. Researchers conducted a study comparing individual rearing vs. aggregation rearing of N. littoralis to develop a standardized approach to PMI estimation. The results of the study indicate that beetles reared individually have a higher mortality, take more time to develop and are smaller in size. On the other hand, beetles reared in aggregation have lower mortality, take less time to develop, and are larger in size. The authors suggest that for forensic entomologists to get more precise PMI results from modeling the beetle's activities, it is best to create a model that rears the beetles in aggregation.

N. littoralis have a preference for outdoors and decomposed cadavers. In a study investigating French forensic entomology cases involving the species, it was found that N. littoralis is primarily found on cadavers that are in "advanced decomposition". They are also frequently found on cadavers that are in "early decomposition", but are rarely found on cadavers that fresh. As a result of these preferences by the species, N. littoralis is uncommonly found in forensic entomology cases, since human cadavers are typically found early before advanced decomposition can occur and are also not commonly located outdoors.

N. littoralis also have a seasonal association with forensic entomology cases. In the previously mentioned study, it was found that most of the cases involving the species occurred in the months of June, July, August, and September. In the area of France, these months are typically dry and hot, demonstrating a preference of the species for these conditions.

== Interactions with humans and livestock ==
N. littoralis adults discovered on a human corpse in Italy were studied in experiments. It was revealed that N. littoralis can be retrieved from carcasses from the time frame of March to May. As the carcass decayed, adults appeared 11 days after its positioning and larvae emerged after 25 days. This species displays intense competitive and predatory behavior, toppling insect hierarchies and dominating the decay stage. Olfactometric studies were used to unveil that these beetles are attracted to the sulphur containing compounds that are released by carcasses during their decay. These compounds work in conjugation with other signaling molecules to attract N. littoralis adults and larvae. Carcasses were often a resource utilized by adults for breeding and the growth and development of their larvae.
