= Post-mortem interval =

Time that has elapsed since a person has died

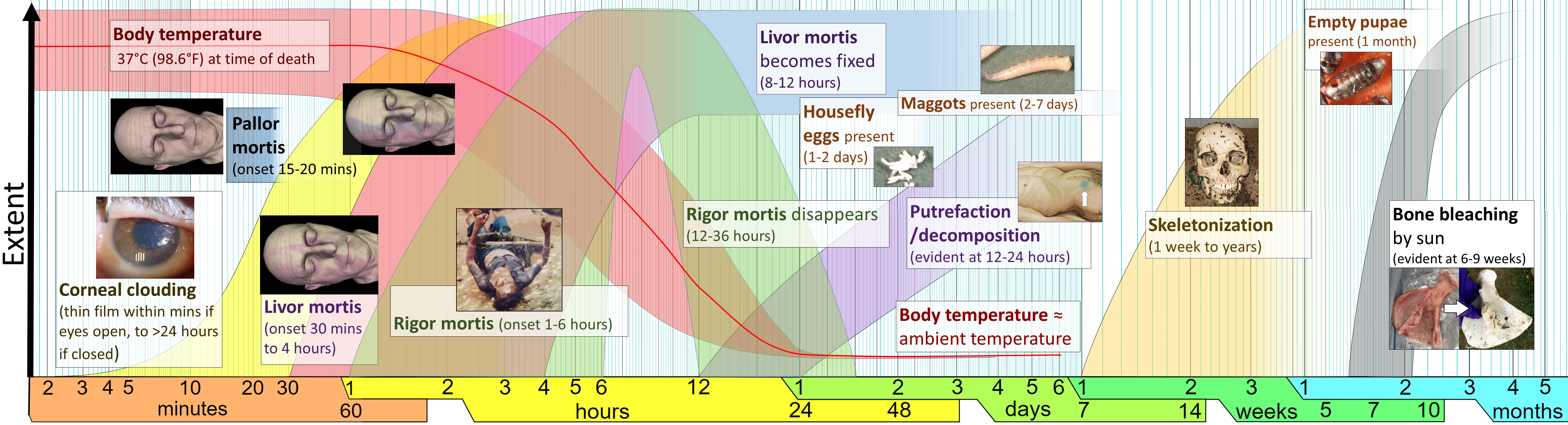
Timeline of postmortem changes.

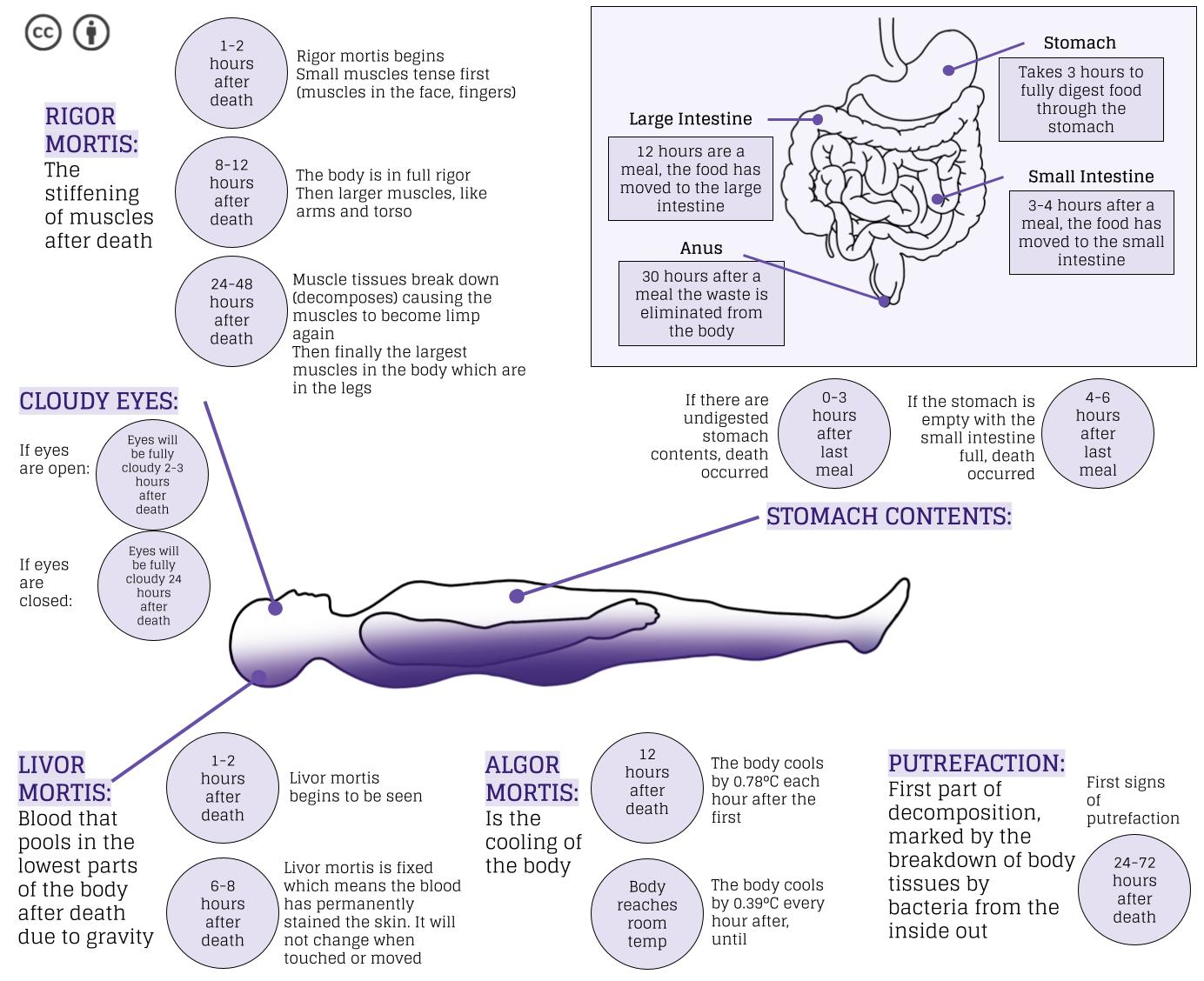
Figure 1. Post-mortem phenomena to estimate the time of death.

The post-mortem interval (PMI) is the time that has elapsed since an individual's death. When the time of death is not known, the interval may be estimated, and so an approximate time of death established. Postmortem interval estimations can range from hours, to days or even years depending on the type of evidence present. There are standard medical and scientific techniques supporting such an estimation.

== Examination of body and scene of death ==
Changes to a body occurring after death (post-mortem changes) include:

- Algor mortis: body cooling;
- Livor mortis: settling of blood in the lowest-placed parts of the body;
- Rigor mortis: stiffening of limbs.

Conditions at the scene of death affect the estimation of time of death. To algor mortis, livor mortis and rigor mortis, together with consideration of stomach contents, there needs to be some observation of environmental conditions at the death scene to accurately measure the PMI (Fig. 1). Factors that can affect the rate of human decomposition are concerned with the particular environment a body has been recovered from. Bodies can be found anywhere from terrestrial to aquatic environments, each possessing their own variables that can alter interval estimations. Along with common factors of temperature, humidity and element exposure, body habitus and clothing are an example of a component that can affect the rate of cooling of the body, and so its rate of decomposition. A very approximate rule of thumb for estimating the postmortem interval is as follows:

- Warm and flaccid: less than 3 hours
- Warm and stiff: 3 to 8 hours
- Cold and stiff: 8 to 36 hours
- Cold and flaccid: More than 36 hours.

Due to significant environmental variations between regions, universal formulas would be ill-suited for this topic in forensic science.

== Analytical techniques ==
There are analytical techniques that can be used to determine the post-mortem interval:

- Forensic entomology: insect (especially blowfly) activity on the corpse.
- Forensic botany: Plant and soil effects on the process of decomposition.
- Forensic pathology: Cause of death determination and subsequent postmortem changes
- Ocular changes: vitreous chemistry composition, eye structural changes.
- State or stage of decomposition: autolysis (process of self-digestion) and putrefaction (process caused by bacteria found within the body).

More advanced methods include DNA quantification, infrared spectroscopy, and for buried individuals changes in soil composition such as the levels of methane, phosphates and nitrates, ninhydrin-reactive nitrogen, volatile organic compounds, and water conductivity, could also reveal the time of death.
