= Rigor mortis (disambiguation) =

Rigor mortis is a stage and a sign of death.

Rigor mortis may also refer to:

== Music ==
- Rigor Mortis (band), American thrash-metal band (1983–2013)
  - Rigor Mortis (album), 1988
- "Rigor Mortis" (song), 1977, by Cameo
- "Rigamortis", 2011, by Kendrick Lamar on his album Section.80
- De RigueurMortis, a 2001 album by Australian band TISM

== Other media ==
- Rigor Mortis (film), a 2013 horror by Juno Mak
- Rigor Mortis (radio), a BBC comedy series, 2003–2006

== See also ==
- Rigor (disambiguation)
- Mortis (disambiguation)
- Trigger Mortis, a 2015 James Bond novel by Anthony Horowitz
