= María Amparo Pascual López =

Pharmacologist, medical doctor

María Amparo Pascual López (born November 29, 1944) is a Cuban pharmacologist, medical doctor and clinical trial expert.

She was the driving force behind the establishment of Cuba's Clinical Trials Coordinating Center (CENCEC), a center for the evaluation of products before their medical practice. She was also named Cuba's first biostatistician and was named one of the 10 most outstanding scientists of Latin America.

== Education ==
In 1967, María Amparo Pascual López graduated from University of Havana, as a Doctor of Medicine. Then, in 1974, she went to the School of Public Health (Escuela de Salud Pública) in La Havana, Cuba She first wanted to focus on medicine, but ultimately decided on becoming a biostatistician.

== Career ==
Following the rapid development of the pharmaceutical industry in Cuba, there needed to be a method for evaluating products before they are introduced to the public. As a result, María Amparo Pascual López, along with four other specialists, established the CENCEC, with the objective of ensuring proper clinical assessment of medical-pharmaceutical and biotechnology products will ethical, scientific and methodological rigor, while complying with international standards to be ready to be approved for marketing both in Cuba and internationally María Amparo Pascual López shifted her focus from being a doctor to investigation in oncology, and then in the rest of the specialties. She has also been a professor at the University of Habana, teaching Biostatistics and Bioethics.

From 1991 to 2014, María Amparo Pascual López was a founding director of the CENCEC. In 2013, she was named one of the 10 female leaders of science in Latin America.
