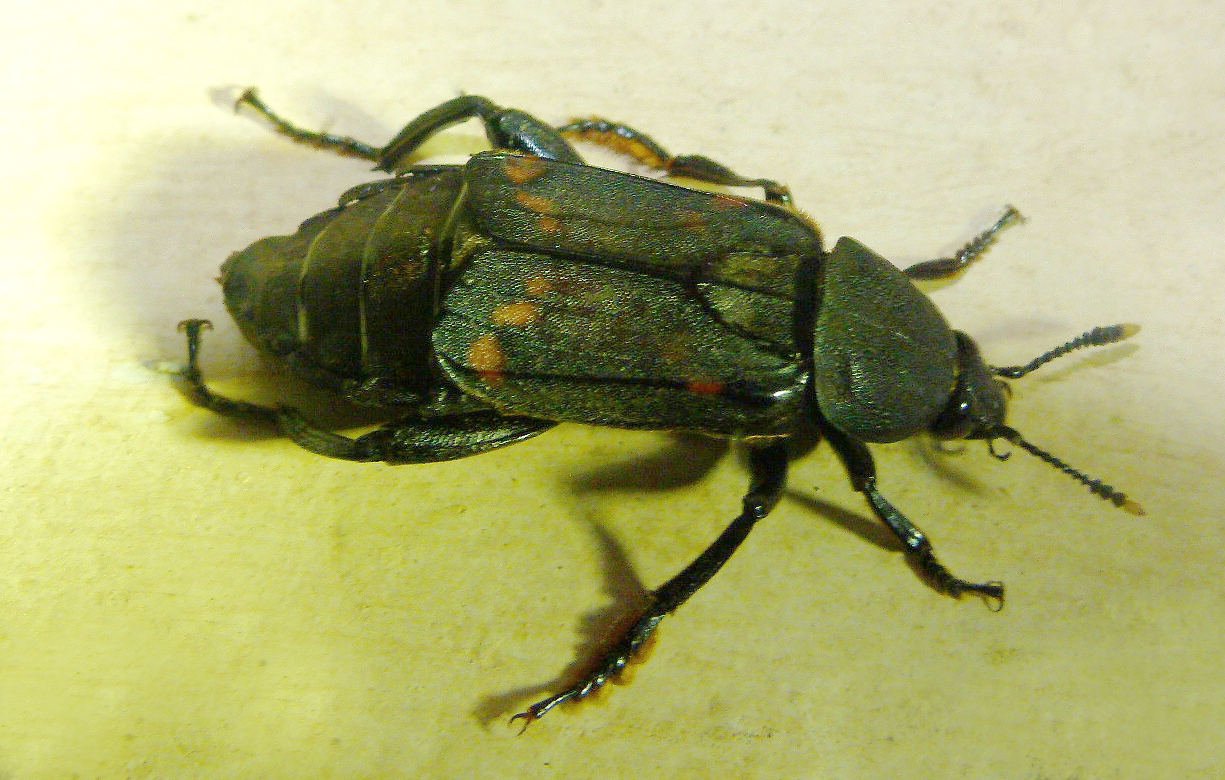

Scientific classification
- Kingdom: Animalia
- Phylum: Arthropoda
- Clade: Pancrustacea
- Class: Insecta
- Order: Coleoptera
- Suborder: Polyphaga
- Infraorder: Staphyliniformia
- Family: Staphylinidae
- Genus: Diamesus
- Species: D. osculans

Binomial name
- Diamesus osculans (Vigors, 1825)

Synonyms
- Diamesus diffusus Portevin, 1926; Diamesus reductus Pic, 1917; Necrodes bifasciatus Dejean, 1833; Necrodes osculans Vigors, 1825

= Diamesus osculans =

Species of beetle

Diamesus osculans, is a species of carrion beetle found in the Indo-Malayan Realm and is known from India, Sri Lanka, Indonesia, Philippines, Laos, China, and Australia.

== Description ==
It is the largest species carrion beetle in the subfamily Silphinae which is commonly found on decaying corpse with forensic value. Adults can be easily attracted by light trap and animal remains.

== Genetics ==
In 2020, the complete mitochondrial genome of the species was assembled. It comprised with 19,398 base pairs in length with a total of 22 tRNA genes, 2 rRNA, and 13 protein-coding genes (PCG).

== Gallery ==
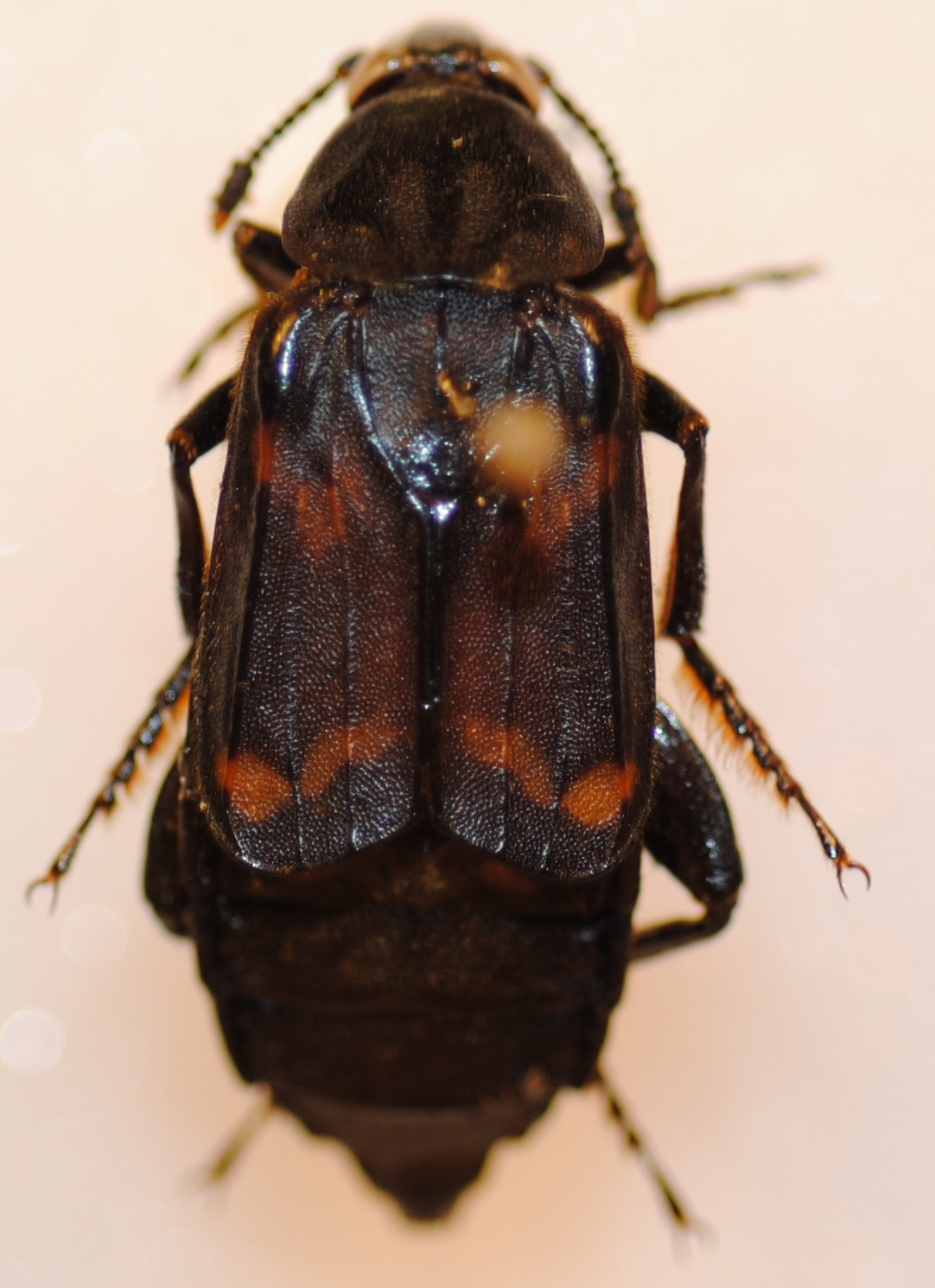

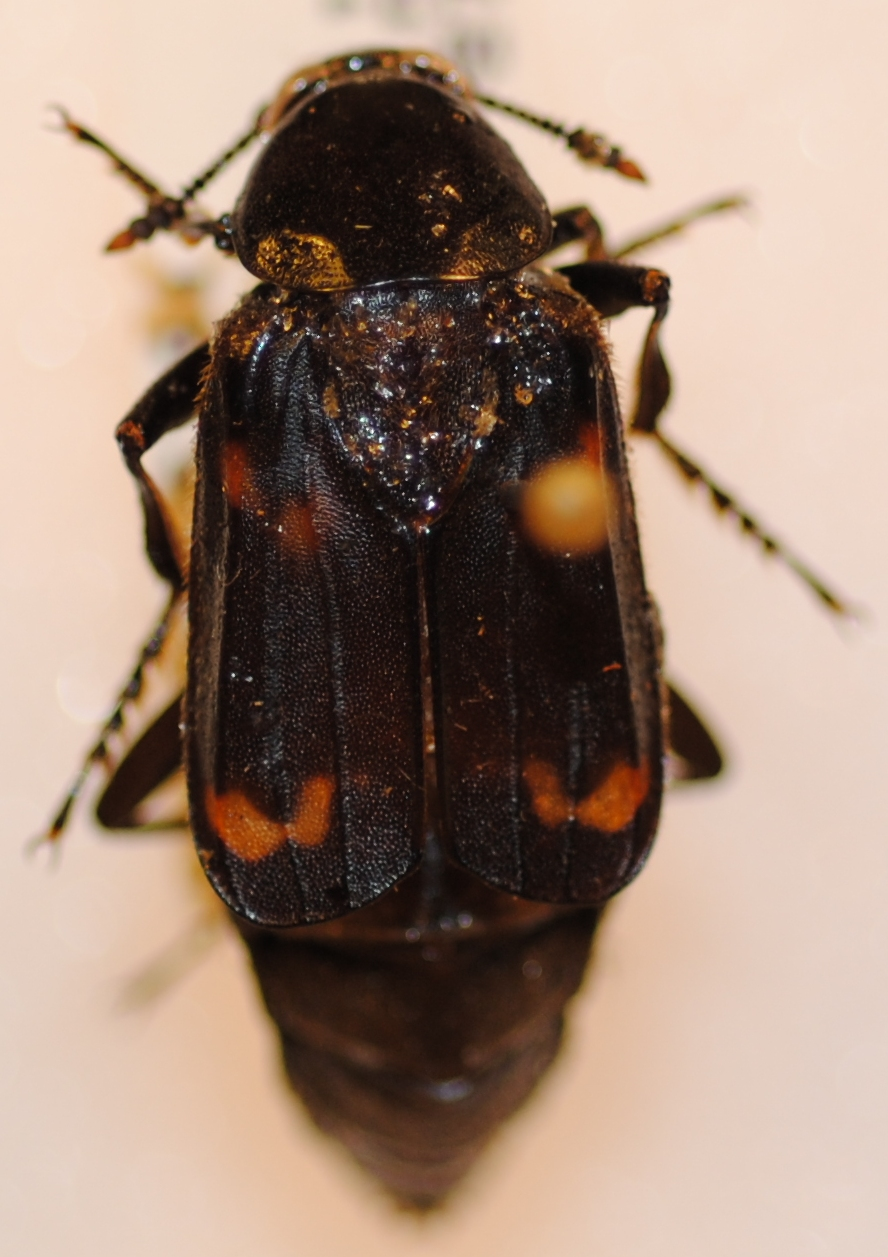

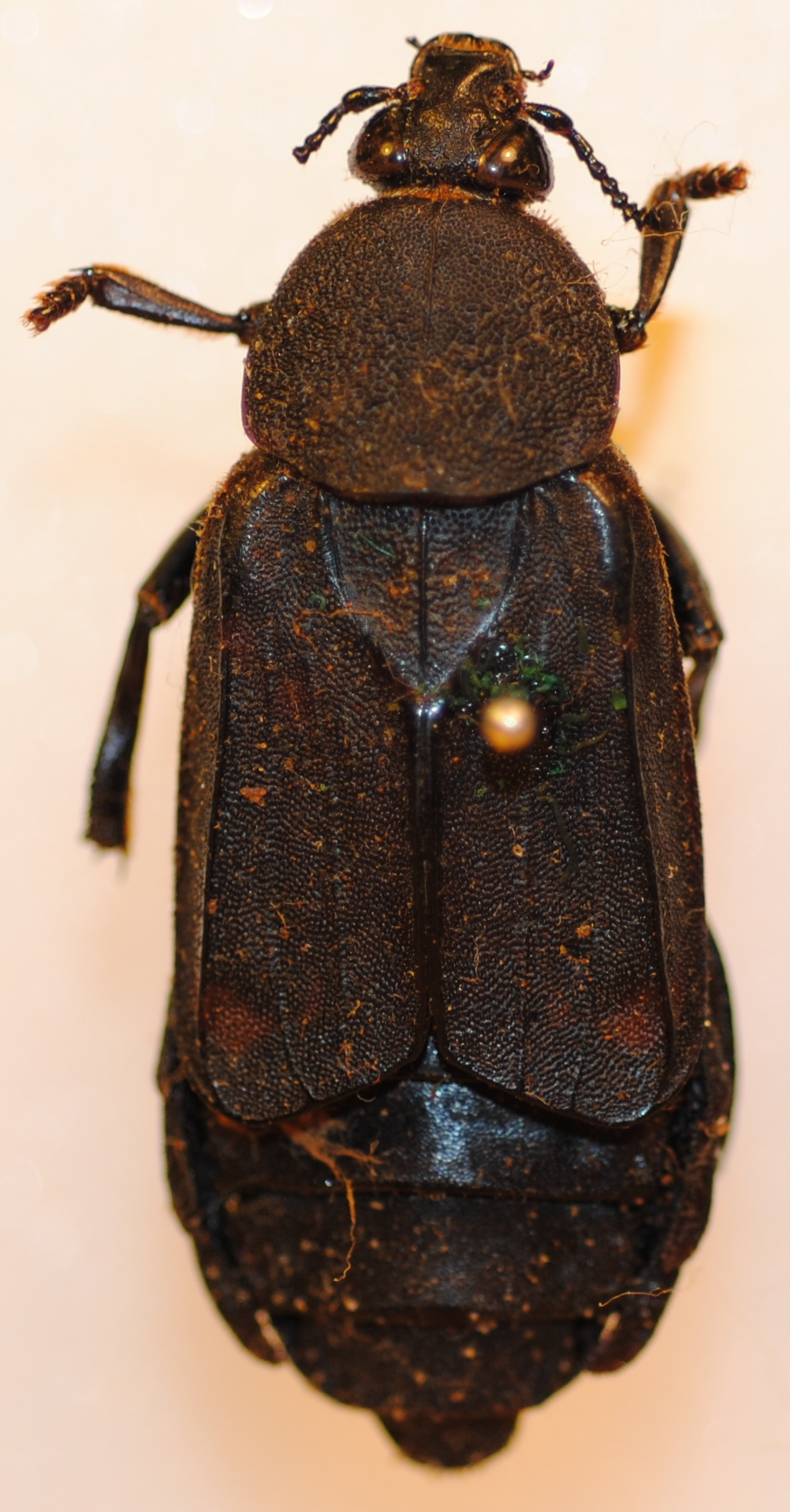

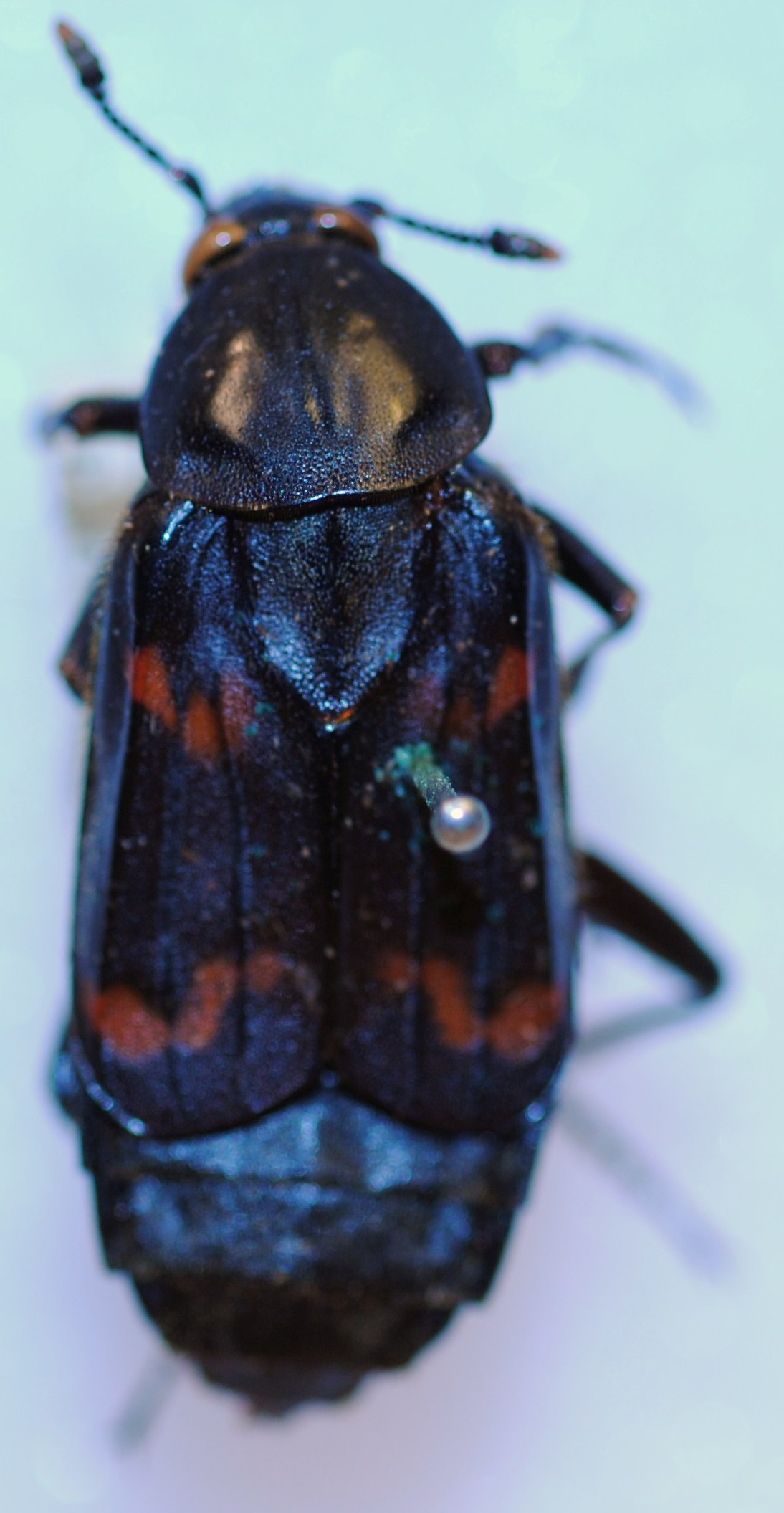

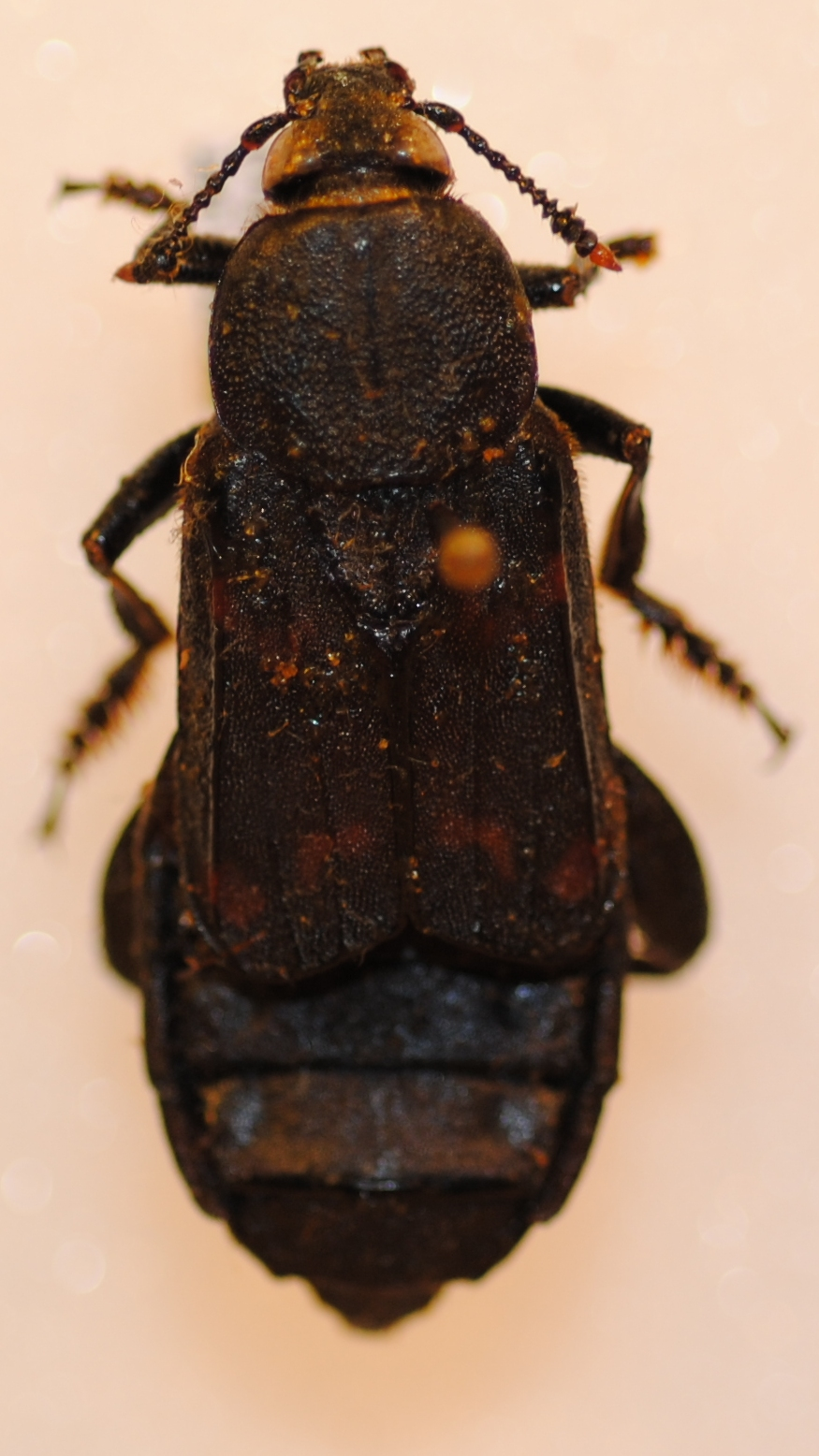

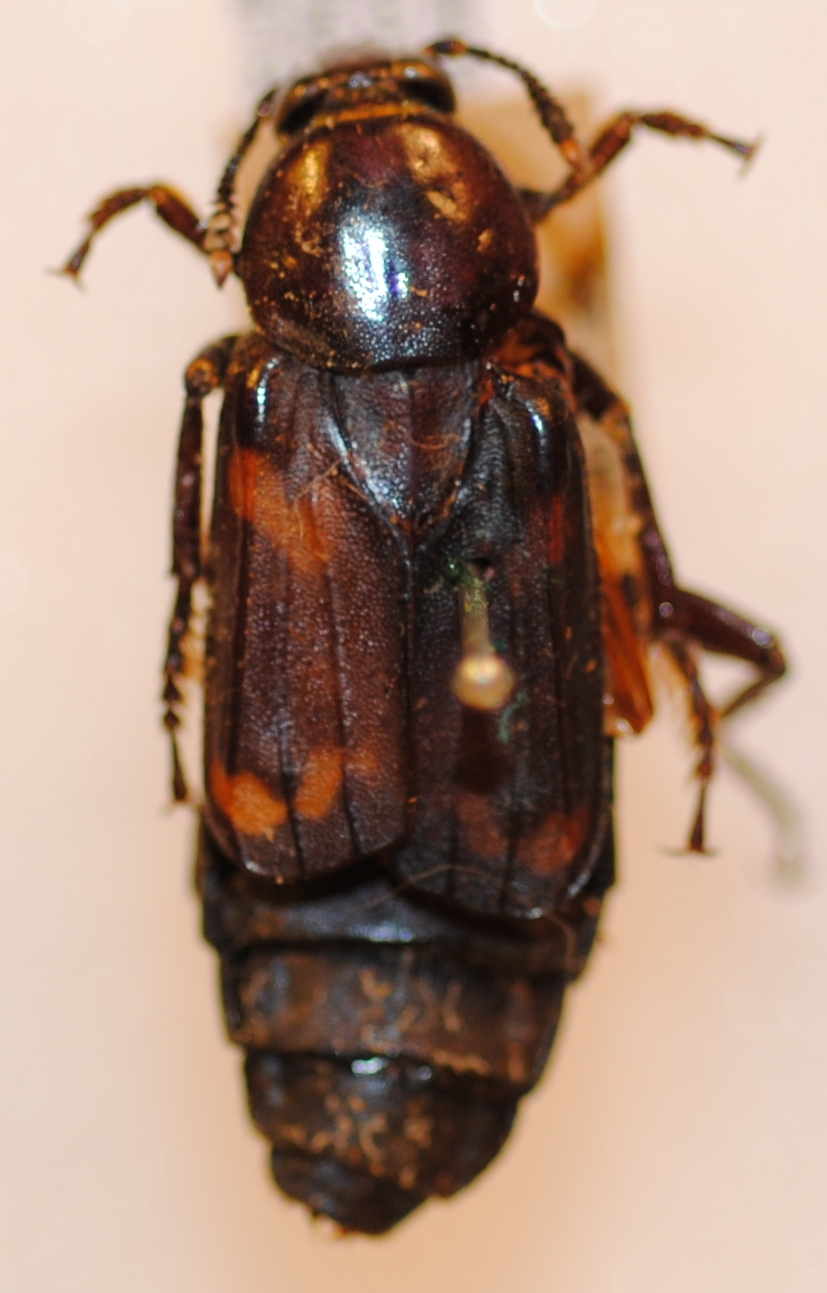

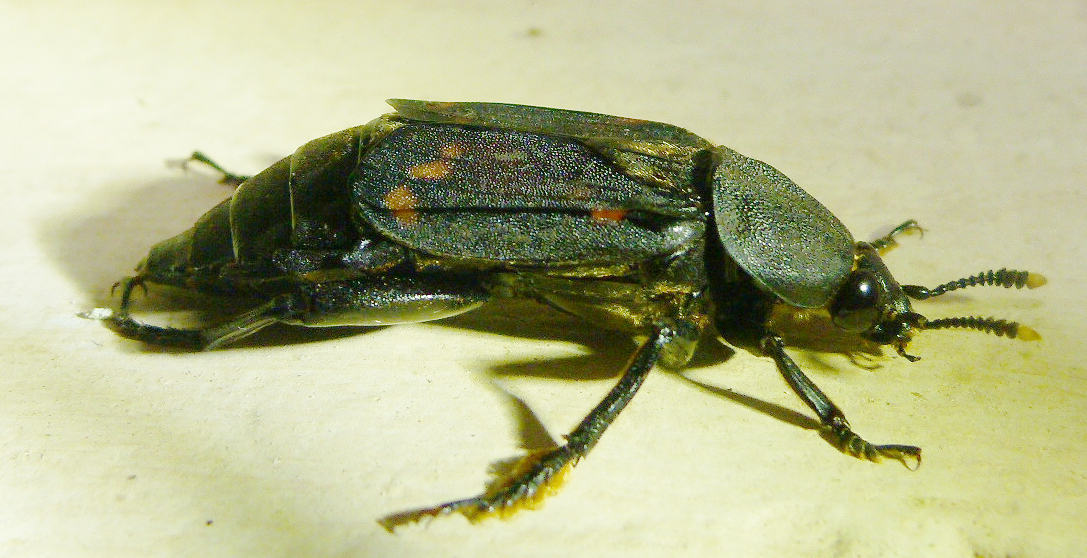
