= Pallor mortis =

First stage of death

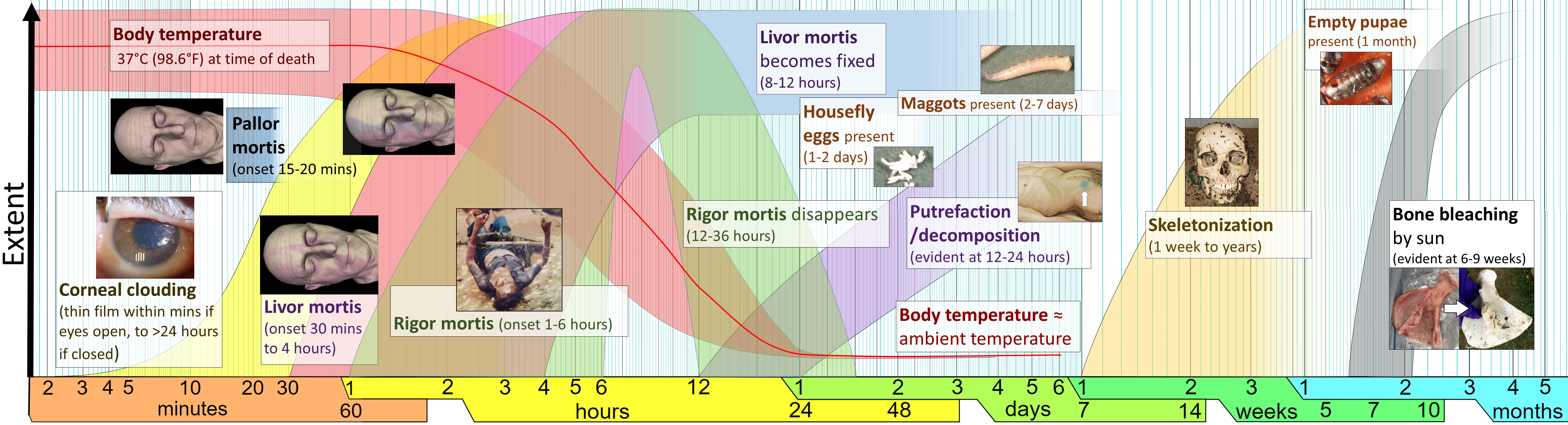
Timeline of postmortem changes (stages of death), with pallor mortis near left side.

Pallor mortis (from Latin pallor 'paleness' and mortis 'of death') is the first stage of death and is when the skin turns pale. It is most apparent in individuals with fair skin. An opto-electronical colour measurement device is used to measure pallor mortis on bodies.

== Timing and applicability ==
Pallor mortis occurs almost immediately, generally within 15–25 minutes, after death. Paleness develops so rapidly after death that it has little to no use in determining the time of death, aside from saying that it either happened less than 30 minutes ago or more, which could help if the body were found very soon after death.

== Cause ==
Pallor mortis results from the collapse of capillary circulation throughout the body. Gravity then causes the blood to sink down into the lower parts of the body, creating livor mortis.

== Similar paleness in living persons ==
A living person can look deathly pale, with such paleness often likened to death in figurative speech and in fiction. This can happen when blood escapes from the surface of the skin, in a matter of deep shock. Also heart failure (insufficientia cordis) can make the face appear pale; the person then might have blue lips. Skin can also become pale as a result of vasoconstriction as part of the body's homeostatic systems in cold conditions, or if the skin is deficient in vitamin D, as seen in people who spend most of the time indoors, away from sunlight.
