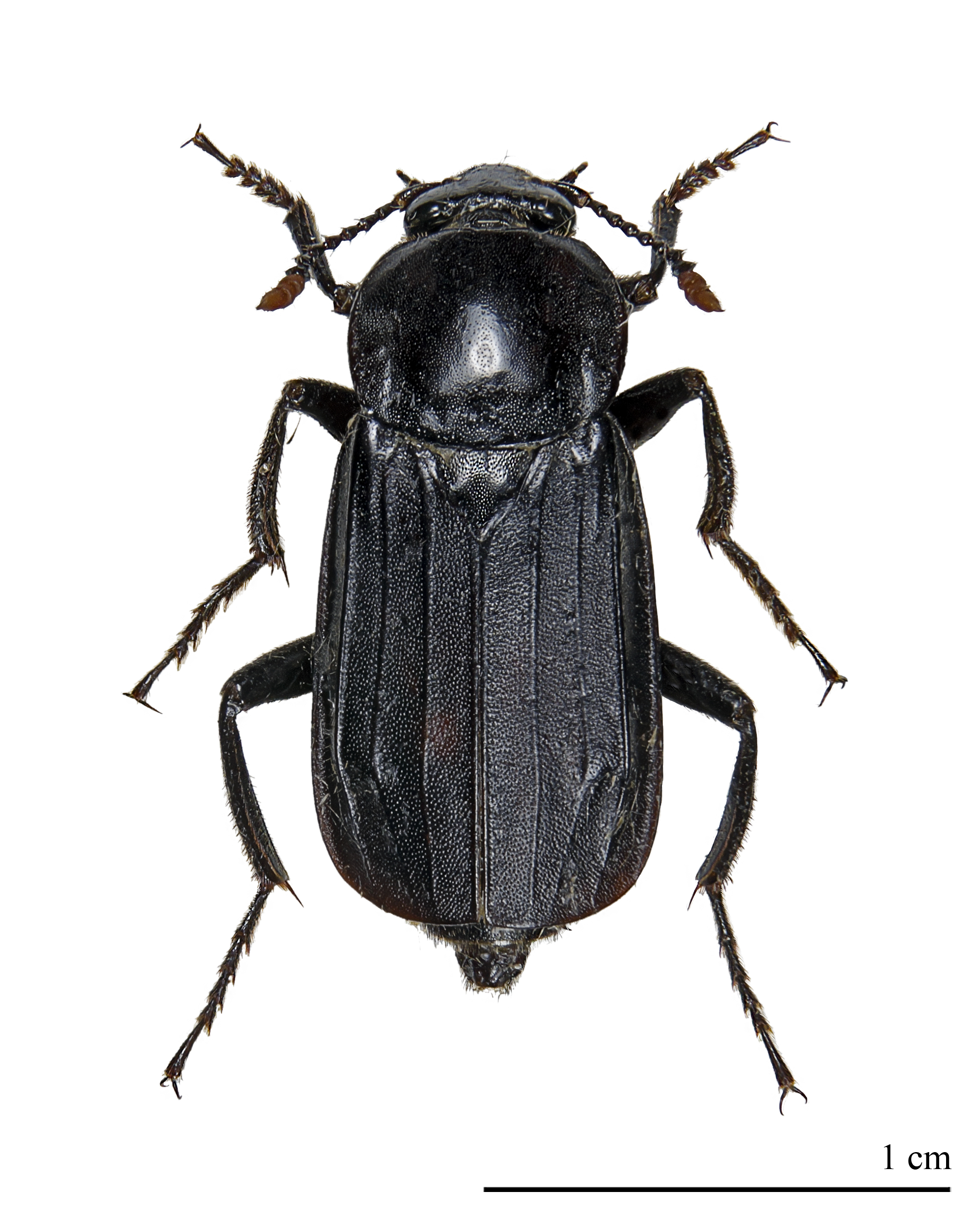
- Necrodes littoralis

Scientific classification
- Kingdom: Animalia
- Phylum: Arthropoda
- Clade: Pancrustacea
- Class: Insecta
- Order: Coleoptera
- Suborder: Polyphaga
- Infraorder: Staphyliniformia
- Family: Staphylinidae
- Subfamily: Silphinae
- Tribe: Necrodini; Portevin, 1926

= Necrodini =

Tribe of beetles

Necrodini is a tribe of carrion beetles in the subfamily Silphinae. It contains two genera - Necrodes and Diamesus.
