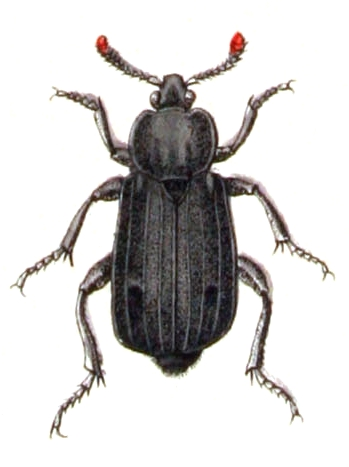
- Necrodes littoralis

Scientific classification
- Kingdom: Animalia
- Phylum: Arthropoda
- Clade: Pancrustacea
- Class: Insecta
- Order: Coleoptera
- Suborder: Polyphaga
- Infraorder: Staphyliniformia
- Family: Staphylinidae
- Subfamily: Silphinae
- Tribe: Necrodini
- Genus: Necrodes; Leach, 1815

= Necrodes =

Genus of carrion beetles in the family Silphidae

Necrodes is a genus of carrion beetles in the family Silphidae. There are at least four described species in Necrodes.

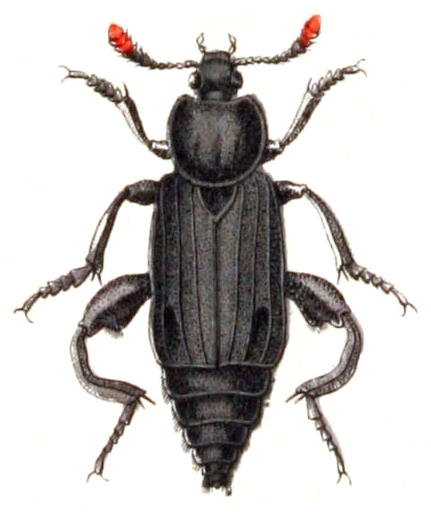

== Species ==
These four species belong to the genus Necrodes:

- Necrodes littoralis (Linnaeus, 1758)
- Necrodes nigricornis Harold, 1875
- Necrodes primaevus Beutenmüller & Cockerell, 1908
- Necrodes surinamensis (Fabricius, 1775) (red-lined carrion beetle)
