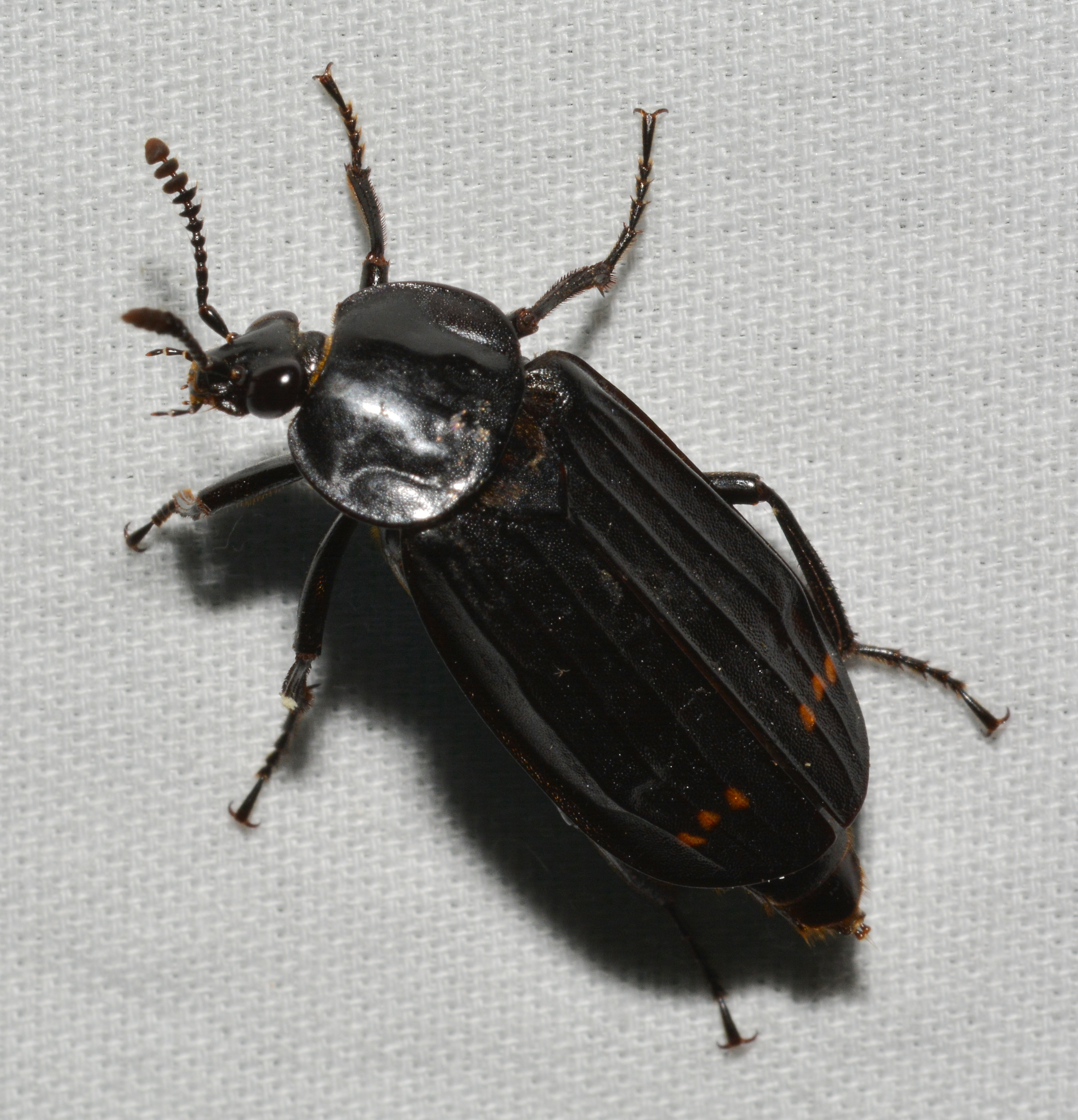

Scientific classification
- Kingdom: Animalia
- Phylum: Arthropoda
- Clade: Pancrustacea
- Class: Insecta
- Order: Coleoptera
- Suborder: Polyphaga
- Infraorder: Staphyliniformia
- Family: Staphylinidae
- Genus: Necrodes
- Species: N. surinamensis

Binomial name
- Necrodes surinamensis (Fabricius, 1775)

= Necrodes surinamensis =

Species of beetle

Necrodes surinamensis, the red-lined carrion beetle, is a species of carrion beetle in the family Silphidae. It is found in North America.
