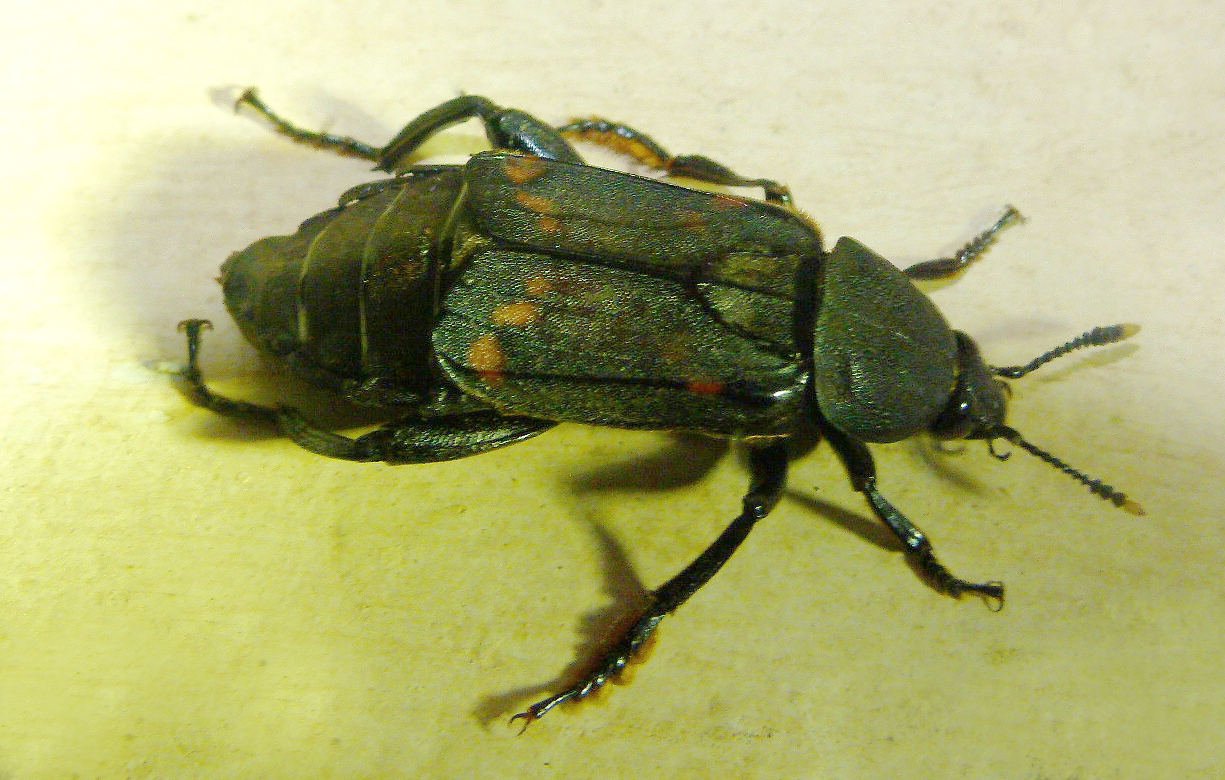
- Diamesus osculans from southern India

Scientific classification
- Kingdom: Animalia
- Phylum: Arthropoda
- Clade: Pancrustacea
- Class: Insecta
- Order: Coleoptera
- Suborder: Polyphaga
- Infraorder: Staphyliniformia
- Family: Staphylinidae
- Subfamily: Silphinae
- Tribe: Necrodini
- Genus: Diamesus; Hope, 1840

Species
- D. osculans (Vigors, 1825); D. bimaculatus Portevin, 1914

= Diamesus =

Genus of beetles

Diamesus is a genus of rather large carrion beetle with two species distributed in tropical Asia and Australia. Like other Silphinae, it has an antenna with 11 segments. About 3 or 4 abdominal segments are visible beyond the tip of the elytra. The elytra themselves have longitudinal keels. The type species is Diamesus osculans. The larvae are broad and flat and somewhat cockroach-like (blattiform).
