= Cognitive rigor =

Cognitive rigor is a combined model developed by superimposing two existing models for describing rigor that are widely accepted in the education system in the United States. The concept "is marked and measured by the depth and extent students are challenged and engaged to demonstrate and communicate their knowledge and thinking" and also "marks and measures the depth and complexity of student learning experiences."

Cognitive Rigor is the superposition of Bloom's Taxonomy and Webb's Depth-of-Knowledge levels and is used to categorize the level of abstraction of questions and activities in education. The Cognitive Rigor Matrix assists applying Cognitive Rigor in the classroom. These models are intended for use in curriculum development and lesson planning so that students acquire the rigorous skills and knowledge needed for post-secondary education.

The idea of interlacing Bloom's Taxonomy and Webb's Depth-of-Knowledge to create a new tool for measuring curricular quality was completed in 2005 by Karin Hess of the National Center for Assessment, producing a 4 X 6 matrix (the Cognitive Rigor Matrix or Hess Matrix) for categorizing the Bloom's Taxonomy and Webb's Depth-of-Knowledge levels for each activity or question appearing in curricular materials. The Cognitive Rigor Matrix aligns the six Bloom's Taxonomy levels along the columns of the matrix and the four Webb's Depth-of-Knowledge levels along the rows.

Working independently, John Walkup and Ben Jones of The Standards Company LLC developed an identical matrix in 2007 and used it to measure the cognitive rigor of completed student work collected from two large-scale studies of the enacted curriculum in Oklahoma and Nevada. In 2009, Hess, et al. published a paper defining Cognitive Rigor, describing how the model overcomes limitations of using Bloom's Taxonomy, and describing the model's use. The paper shows how Bloom's Taxonomy identifies processes (categorizes cognitive skills), and Webb's Depth of Knowledge shows quantification and application (focuses on depth of understanding and scope of content). The combined models further the application of Bloom's Taxonomy to testing and assessment applications. The Cognitive Rigor Matrix included in the article is often made available as a separate document, with example activities included in each cell of the matrix.

The Smarter Balanced Assessment Consortium adopted the concept of Cognitive Rigor and the Hess Matrix in 2012 to measure the rigor of test items for the Next Generation of Assessments. Various educational organizations, including the Arizona Department of Education, the New York City Department of Education, Chicago Public Schools, and most states currently use the Cognitive Rigor Matrix in training materials for their professional development.
