= Rigour =

Adhering absolutely to certain constraints with consistency

Rigour (British English) or rigor (American English; see spelling differences) describes a condition of stiffness or strictness. These constraints may be environmentally imposed, such as "the rigours of famine"; logically imposed, such as mathematical proofs which must maintain consistent answers; or socially imposed, such as the process of defining ethics and law.

== Etymology ==
"Rigour" comes to English through Old French (13th c., Modern French rigueur) meaning "stiffness", which itself is based on the Latin rigorem (nominative rigor) "numbness, stiffness, hardness, firmness; roughness, rudeness", from the verb rigere "to be stiff". The noun was frequently used to describe a condition of strictness or stiffness, which arises from a situation or constraint either chosen or experienced passively. For example, the title of the book Theologia Moralis Inter Rigorem et Laxitatem Medi roughly translates as "mediating theological morality between rigour and laxness". The book details, for the clergy, situations in which they are obligated to follow church law exactly, and in which situations they can be more forgiving yet still considered moral. Rigor mortis translates directly as the stiffness (rigor) of death (mortis), again describing a condition which arises from a certain constraint (death).

== Intellectualism ==
Intellectual rigour is a process of thought which is consistent, does not contain self-contradiction, and takes into account the entire scope of available knowledge on the topic. It actively avoids logical fallacy. Furthermore, it requires a sceptical assessment of the available knowledge. If a topic or case is dealt with in a rigorous way, it typically means that it is dealt with in a comprehensive, thorough and complete way, leaving no room for inconsistencies.

Scholarly method describes the different approaches or methods which may be taken to apply intellectual rigour on an institutional level to ensure the quality of information published. An example of intellectual rigour assisted by a methodical approach is the scientific method, in which a person will produce a hypothesis based on what they believe to be true, then construct experiments in order to prove that hypothesis wrong. This method, when followed correctly, helps to prevent against circular reasoning and other fallacies which frequently plague conclusions within academia. Other disciplines, such as philosophy and mathematics, employ their own structures to ensure intellectual rigour. Each method requires close attention to criteria for logical consistency, as well as to all relevant evidence and possible differences of interpretation. At an institutional level, peer review is used to validate intellectual rigour.

=== Honesty ===
Intellectual rigour is a subset of intellectual honesty—a practice of thought in which ones convictions are kept in proportion to valid evidence. Intellectual honesty is an unbiased approach to the acquisition, analysis, and transmission of ideas. A person is being intellectually honest when he or she, knowing the truth, states that truth, regardless of outside social/environmental pressures. It is possible to doubt whether complete intellectual honesty exists—on the grounds that no one can entirely master his or her own presuppositions—without doubting that certain kinds of intellectual rigour are potentially available. The distinction certainly matters greatly in debate, if one wishes to say that an argument is flawed in its premises.

== Politics and law ==
The setting for intellectual rigour does tend to assume a principled position from which to advance or argue. An opportunistic tendency to use any argument at hand is not very rigorous, although very common in politics, for example. Arguing one way one day, and another later, can be defended by casuistry, i.e. by saying the cases are different.

In the legal context, for practical purposes, the facts of cases do always differ. Case law can therefore be at odds with a principled approach; and intellectual rigour can seem to be defeated. This defines a judge's problem with uncodified law. Codified law poses a different problem, of interpretation and adaptation of definite principles without losing the point; here applying the letter of the law, with all due rigour, may on occasion seem to undermine the principled approach.

== Mathematics ==
Mathematical rigour can apply to methods of mathematical proof and to methods of mathematical practice (thus relating to other interpretations of rigour).

=== Mathematical proof ===
Mathematical rigour is often cited as a kind of gold standard for mathematical proof. Its history traces back to Greek mathematics, especially to Euclid's Elements.

Until the 19th century, Euclid's Elements was seen as extremely rigorous and profound, but in the late 19th century, Hilbert (among others) realized that the work left certain assumptions implicit—assumptions that could not be proved from Euclid's Axioms (e.g. two circles can intersect in a point, some point is within an angle, and figures can be superimposed on each other). This was contrary to the idea of rigorous proof where all assumptions need to be stated and nothing can be left implicit. New foundations were developed using the axiomatic method to address this gap in rigour found in the Elements (e.g., Hilbert's axioms, Birkhoff's axioms, Tarski's axioms).

During the 19th century, the term "rigorous" began to be used to describe increasing levels of abstraction when dealing with calculus which eventually became known as mathematical analysis. The works of Cauchy added rigour to the older works of Euler and Gauss. The works of Riemann added rigour to the works of Cauchy. The works of Weierstrass added rigour to the works of Riemann, eventually culminating in the arithmetization of analysis. Starting in the 1870s, the term gradually came to be associated with Cantorian set theory.

Mathematical rigour can be modelled as amenability to algorithmic proof checking. Indeed, with the aid of computers, it is possible to check some proofs mechanically. Formal rigour is the introduction of high degrees of completeness by means of a formal language where such proofs can be codified using set theories such as ZFC (see automated theorem proving).

Published mathematical arguments have to conform to a standard of rigour, but are written in a mixture of symbolic and natural language. In this sense, written mathematical discourse is a prototype of formal proof. Often, a written proof is accepted as rigorous although it might not be formalised as yet. The reason often cited by mathematicians for writing informally is that completely formal proofs tend to be longer and more unwieldy, thereby obscuring the line of argument. An argument that appears obvious to human intuition may in fact require fairly long formal derivations from the axioms. A particularly well-known example is how in Principia Mathematica, Whitehead and Russell have to expend a number of lines of rather opaque effort in order to establish that, indeed, it is sensical to say: "1+1=2". In short, comprehensibility is favoured over formality in written discourse.

Still, advocates of automated theorem provers may argue that the formalisation of proof does improve the mathematical rigour by disclosing gaps or flaws in informal written discourse. When the correctness of a proof is disputed, formalisation is a way to settle such a dispute as it helps to reduce misinterpretations or ambiguity.

=== Physics ===
The role of mathematical rigour in relation to physics is twofold:

1. First, there is the general question, sometimes called Wigner's Puzzle, "how it is that mathematics, quite generally, is applicable to nature?" Some scientists believe that its record of successful application to nature justifies the study of mathematical physics.
2. Second, there is the question regarding the role and status of mathematically rigorous results and relations. This question is particularly vexing in relation to quantum field theory, where computations often produce infinite values for which a variety of non-rigorous work-arounds have been devised.

Both aspects of mathematical rigour in physics have attracted considerable attention in philosophy of science (see, for example, ref. and ref. and the works quoted therein).

== Education ==
Rigour in the classroom is a hotly debated topic amongst educators. Even the semantic meaning of the word is contested.

Generally speaking, classroom rigour consists of multi-faceted, challenging instruction and correct placement of the student. Students excelling in formal operational thought tend to excel in classes for gifted students. Students who have not reached that final stage of cognitive development, according to developmental psychologist Jean Piaget, can build upon those skills with the help of a properly trained teacher.

Rigour in the classroom is commonly called "rigorous instruction". It is instruction that requires students to construct meaning for themselves, impose structure on information, integrate individual skills into processes, operate within but at the outer edge of their abilities, and apply what they learn in more than one context and to unpredictable situations.

== See also ==
- Cognitive rigor
- Intellectual honesty
- Intellectual dishonesty
- Pedant
- Scientific method
- Self-deception
- Sophistry
