= Livor mortis =

Second stage of death

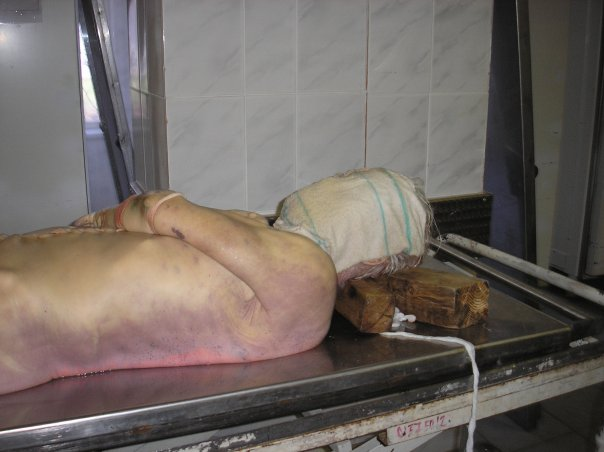
Livor mortis in a dead body

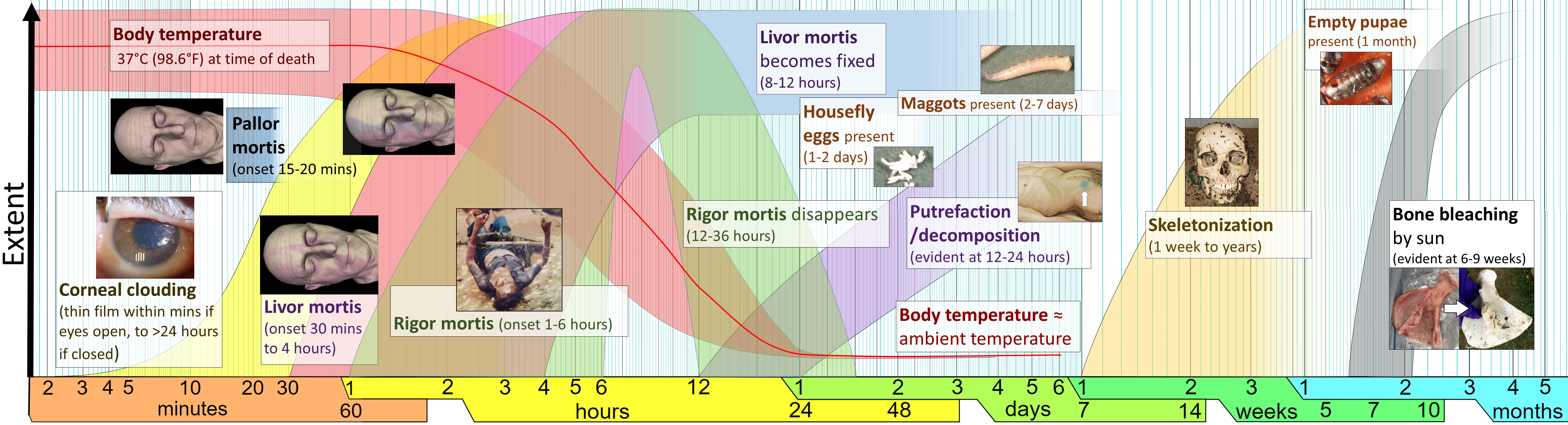
Timeline of postmortem changes, including livor mortis.

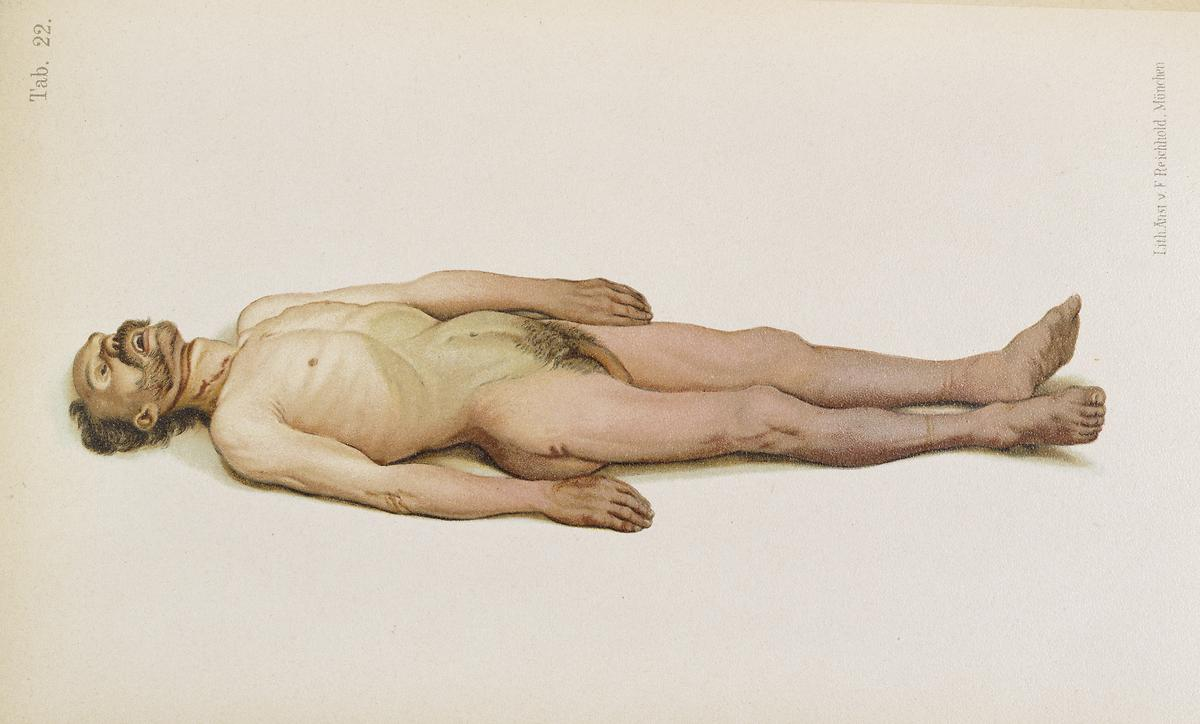
Depiction of a body after suicide hanging. Livor mortis is fixed in the legs and distal upper extremities because these were the dependent parts.

Livor mortis (from Latin līvor 'bluish color, bruise' and mortis 'of death'), postmortem lividity (from Latin post mortem 'after death' and lividitas 'black and blueness'), hypostasis (from Greek ὑπό (hypo) 'under, beneath' and στάσις (stasis) 'a standing') or suggillation, is the second stage of death and one of the signs of death. It is a settling of the blood in the lower, or dependent, portion of the body postmortem, causing a purplish red discoloration of the skin. When the heart stops functioning and is no longer agitating the blood, heavy red blood cells sink through the serum by action of gravity. The blood travels faster in warmer conditions and slower in colder conditions.

Livor mortis starts within 20–30 minutes, but is usually not observable by the human eye until two hours after death. The size of the patches increases in the next three to six hours. Fixation will begin to occur during this timeframe, causing the patches to be unaltered due to movement. Maximum lividity will occur between eight and twelve hours after death. Areas of blood pooling in contact with the ground will blanch, or remain white. The blood pools into the interstitial tissues of the body. The intensity of the color depends upon the amount of reduced haemoglobin in the blood. The discoloration does not occur in the areas of the body that are in contact with the ground or another object, in which capillaries are compressed.

== Applicability ==
Coroners can use the presence or absence of livor mortis as a means of determining an approximate time of death. It can also be used by forensic investigators to determine whether or not a body has been moved. For instance, if the body is found lying prone, but the pooling is present on the deceased's back, investigators can conclude that the body was originally positioned supine. The colour of the pooling can help in determining cause of death. Carbon monoxide poisoning causes a red colouration.

Among coroners and other investigators, such as homicide and forensic detectives, livor mortis is not considered an exact way to measure time of death, but rather as a method of approximating it. Livor mortis, along with algor mortis, rigor mortis, and practices such as forensic entomology are frequently combined by investigators to more accurately pinpoint the estimated time of death.
