= Algor mortis =

Third stage of death

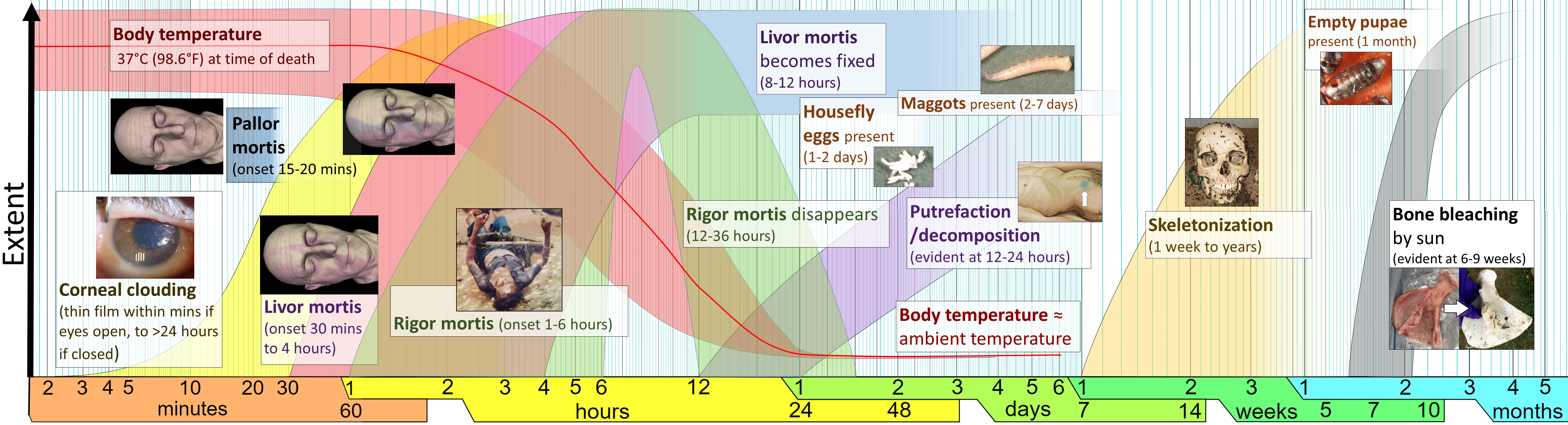
Timeline of postmortem changes, with algor mortis represented by red temperature line

Algor mortis (from Latin algor 'coldness' and mortis 'of death'), the third stage of death, is the change in body temperature post mortem, until the ambient temperature is matched. This is generally a steady decline, although if the ambient temperature is above the body temperature (such as in a hot environment), the change in temperature will be positive, as the (relatively) cooler body equalizes with the warmer environment. External factors can have a significant influence.

The term was first used by Bennet Dowler in 1849. The first published measurements of the intervals of temperature after death were done by John Davy in 1839.

== Applicability ==
An XY plot of the Glaister equation with values from 37 °C to 20 °C (a commonly used ambient temperature)

A measured rectal temperature can give some indication of the time of death. Although the heat conduction which leads to body cooling follows an exponential decay curve, it can be approximated as a linear process: 2 °C during the first hour and 1 °C per hour until the body nears ambient temperature.

The Glaister equation estimates the hours elapsed since death as a linear function of the rectal temperature:

$$(36.9^\circ C - \text{rectal temperature in Celsius})\cdot\frac{6}{5}$$

or

$$\frac{98.4\,^{\circ}{\rm F} - \text{rectal temperature in Fahrenheit}}{1.5}$$

== Variability ==
Generally, temperature change is considered an inaccurate means of determining time of death, as the rate of change is affected by several key factors, including:

- Stability or fluctuation of the ambient temperature.
- The thickness (i.e. thermal insulation value) and body coverage of clothing or similar materials.
- The thermal conductivity of the surface on which a body lies.
- Diseases or drugs which increase body temperature and thereby raise the starting temperature of the corpse at the time of death
- The existence of a "temperature plateau", a highly variable length of time in which the body does not cool.
