= Ripley's Believe It or Not! (1982 TV series) =

American documentary television series (1982–1986)

- Based on: Ripley's Believe It or Not!
- Country of origin: United States
- Original language: English
- No. of seasons: 4
- No. of episodes: 77 (incl. specials in 1981)

Production
- Production companies: Ripley Entertainment; Haley Lyon Rastar; King Features Syndicate; Columbia Pictures Television; Haley-Lyon Productions

Original release
- Network: ABC
- Release: 1982 – 1986

Related
- Ripley's Believe It or Not!; Ripley's Believe It or Not!: The Animated Series

Ripley's Believe It or Not! is an American documentary television series hosted by Jack Palance that aired on ABC from 1982 to 1986 and is the second television version of Ripley's Believe It or Not!. Based on the travels and discoveries of oddity-hunter Ripley, this show looked at the people, places and events that made up the stranger side of human history. Subjects have included Nikola Tesla, The Bermuda Triangle, The Elephant Man, and Mad King Ludwig. The series featured Palance or a co-host showcasing strange events, places of odd significance, trivia, and a commercial bumper of original art from Ripley's comics. In a few cases, such as the assassination of Rasputin, Palance reenacted the event in period costume and a stage set. Henry Mancini and His Orchestra provided the theme song.

The series was predated by two 1981 specials hosted by Palance on May 3, 1981 (directed by Ronald Lyon) and November 6, 1981.

Co-hosts included actress Catherine Shirriff in season 1, Palance's daughter Holly Palance in seasons 2 and 3 and singer Marie Osmond, in season 4.

== Episodes ==
| Season | Episodes | Originally released | |
| Season | Episodes | First released | Last released |
|---|---|---|---|
| 1 | 21 | September 26, 1982 | May 5, 1983 |
| Special 1 | 1 | May 3, 1981 | |
| Special 2 | 1 | November 6, 1981 | |
| 2 | 22 | September 25, 1983 | May 13, 1984 |
| 3 | 22 | September 23, 1984 | March 31, 1985 |
| 4 | 11 | September 29, 1985 | February 6, 1986 |

=== Specials ===
| No. | Directed by | Written by | Original release date |
|---|---|---|---|
| Special | Ronald Lyon | Ronald Lyon | May 3, 1981 |
Host Jack Palance examines some of the oddities chronicled for more than 60 years in the popular newspaper feature, including a mummy that attends board meetings at the University of London College (Jeremy Bentham); a tour of cemeteries to find humorous epitaphs; a man who survived for 12 years with a metal rod through his head; a "jinxed" German ship whose crew of 1800 dwindled to 36 after a string of accidents; how the legend of Dracula may be rooted in the atrocities of a 15th-century Hungarian countess (Elizabeth Báthory); and modern-day experiments in biofeedback.
| Special | Ronald Lyon | Ronald Lyon | November 6, 1981 |
Host Jack Palance examines the grave of Robin Hood, a church in Czechoslovakia made of human bones, and a castle haunted by the ghost of Anne Boleyn.

=== Season 1 ===
| No. | Directed by | Written by | Original release date |
|---|---|---|---|
| 1 | Mel Stuart | Leslie Gargan, David H. Vowell, Jimmy Sangster and Ed Spiegel | September 26, 1982 |
Hosts Jack Palance and Catherine Shirriff tour the world seeking the unique and bizarre. Among the opening oddities: moments captured through stroboscopic photography; buildings designed to appear unfinished or crumbling; a Paris cemetery considered "fashionable"; a conductor who can't read music conducting "the world's worst orchestra" in London; corpses in Denmark preserved for more than 2000 years; death rites and rituals.
| 2 | Ronald Lyon | David H. Vowell, Leslie Gargan | October 3, 1982 |
Segments include habits of the vampire bat; a dangerous Japanese log-rolling ritual; a lizard that runs across water; a French town's day-long mud fight; the world's largest carousel; the re-creation of the San Francisco finding of an heiress's will in a bottle thrown into London's Thames River 10 years earlier; a blind marathon runner; a snake in Borneo that glides through the air. Bumper(s): The funeral procession of Chinese General Yi Chun stretched out for 2300 miles; The echidna from Tasmania, has hind feet that point in a most peculiar direction, backwards; Sir Francis Joseph Campbell scaled the highest peak in the alps, despite the fact he was blind.
| 3 | Unknown | Unknown | October 17, 1982 |
A segment on unusual foods includes a rattlesnake-eating festival in Texas; an African tribe's daily meal of crocodile; and a lavish banquet, highlighted by truffles, for a Quebec gastronome club. A feature on gorillas includes a preserve in England, and albino gorilla in Spain, and a "conversation" between gorilla and teacher through signing. Archaeological discoveries in China include an "army" of 6000 clay statues built to guard a crypt, and a perfectly preserved corpse more than 2100 years old.
| 4 | Alex Grasshoff | Marshall Flaum, Paul Boorstin, Leslie Gargan, David H. Vowell, Jimmy Sangster, Diana Webster | October 24, 1982 |
After the volcanic destruction of Krakatoa, searchers found nothing left alive but a spider; As part of their mountain way ceremony Navajo Indians swallow their arrows; Gian Gastone de' Medici, the laziest ruler in history, governed Florence, Italy for 8 years from bed. This episode featured footage from Robinson Crusoe, Tarantula, and Laurel and Hardy's Our Wife. Bumper(s): The Real Robinson Crusoe, Alexander Selkirk; Tarantulas; Jumping Spiders, fishing spiders, trapdoor spiders, Dancing procession of Echternach, Luxembourg; Sufi whirling in Turkey, Sungyung Rite (Java), miracle of St. Januarius in Naples; Mad King Ludwig II of Bavaria; wedding customs in Papua New Guinea, Turkey & Korea; Olympic men's marathon of Dorando Pietri in 1908.
| 5 | Irwin Rosten | Leslie Gargan, David H. Vowell, Jimmy Sangster, Mel Stuart | October 30, 1982 |
Females of a species of angler fish, carry two tiny males attached to their sides for life; In the Philippines, bats are a tasty dish. They're simmered in milk and considered a delicacy. This episode featured footage from Richard III, Stagecoach, Lights of Old Santa Fe, and Dracula. Bumper(s): The tale of an English ghost who lead to the recovery of a missing human heart; Transylvania's real-life model for the evil Count Dracula.
| 6 | Jack Haley Jr. | David H. Vowell, Jimmy Sangster, Leslie Gargan | November 7, 1982 |
Episode opens with segment on William Brodie, the man who inspired Robert Louis Stevenson to write The Strange Case of Dr. Jekyll and Mr. Hyde. Segments on unusual occupations include a human mannequin; a man who swallows live poisonous snakes; New Zealanders who herd deer by plane. Segments on hoaxes include an artist who had to prove his skill at forgery to clear himself of a charge of Nazi collaboration; Piltdown Man, a supposed prehistoric species found in England in 1911 and exposed in 1953; writings attributed to Caesar and Cleopatra forge in French rather than Latin. This episode was postponed from an earlier date and featured footage from The Strange Case of Dr. Jekyll and Mr. Hyde. Bumper(s): Poet Gérard de Nerval walked his pet lobster through the streets of Paris on a leash; Crocodile hunters, in New Guinea, capture the ferocious beasts by diving beneath them and tickling their stomachs; In Paris, a conman sold the Eiffel Tower for $300,000 as scrap metal.
| 7 | Jimmy Sangster | Marshall Flaum, Paul Boorstin, Jack Haley Jr., Jimmy Sangster, Ed Spiegel, Diana Webster | November 14, 1982 |
Segments on natural phenomena include the Icelandic volcano Helfel; and a butterfly zoo in London. Segments on a man-made phenomena include the Maginot Line; the Edsel; a robot family built in France 200 years ago; a modern Japanese robot in the likeness of Marilyn Monroe. Also; two Spanish lovers who supposedly died of broken hearts; a trick in which a sheet of typing paper yields a hole big enough to step through. This episode featured footage from The Day the Earth Stood Still. Bumper(s): Mount Etna, the Sicilian volcano, occasionally puffs out huge smoke rings; The Dead Head Moth has a skull imprinted on its body; In Savona, Italy, is one of Europe's most modern Rail Road stations, but it has no tracks.
| 8 | Ed Spiegel | Irwin Rosten, David H. Vowell, Leslie Gargan, Jimmy Sangster | November 21, 1982 |
Segments on unusual sports include medieval jousting currently staged near Canterbury, England; an ancient Chinese martial art; Italian cheese-throwing. A feature on nature's unusual survival methods includes the mating habits of the black-widow spider; praying mantis; snail, water flea and pepsis wasp. A look at time includes a history of time measurement; the city hall clock tower in Munich, Big Ben in London. This episode featured footage from The Body Snatcher and Beat the Devil. Bumper(s): 16th-century wrestlers fought for a dagger, and the winner was entitled to cut the loser's throat; The ray-finned fish of the Amazon, is the only fish that lays its eggs out of water; In 1870, an inventor patented a vehicle powered by two dogs running in circular cage.
| 9 | Jack Palance | David H. Vowell, Jack Haley Jr., Jimmy Sangster, Leslie Gargan, Marshall Flaum, Ed Spiegel | November 28, 1982 |
Segments on Jack the Ripper, unusual death rites include the mummification of Japanese Buddhist saints; the catacombs of Paris; a drive-in mortuary in Atlanta, Ga. (USA) A look at unusual dwellings includes Ponte Vecchio in Italy; a house made of discarded materials in Simi Valley, Ca. A feature on unusual collections includes a 10-ton ball of string and an assemblage of warplanes. Also: the tallest man in modern history; the world's tallest living woman (Sandy Allen). This episode featured newsreel footage of Robert Wadlow. Bumper(s): Two parking meters, with time expired, mark the grave of Archie Arnold near Fort Wayne, Indiana; A house in the West Indies was built to look like a ship sailing out to sea; Walter Cavanagh, of Santa Clara, CA, has collected over 1,100 credit cards.
| 10 | Mel Stuart | David H. Vowell, Leslie Gargan, Jack Haley Jr., Mel Stuart | December 5, 1982 |
A feature with a metaphysical slant contrasts the mining of gold in Brazil's Serra Pelada with a Japanese Buddhist ritual in which priests undertake a marathon pilgrimage. A look at snakes includes the African mamba, grass snake and king snake. Segments on unusual adornments include punk rockers and Japanese geisha. Also: inventor Nikola Tesla. This episode featured footage from Frankenstein. Bumper(s): A combination policeman, judge, and hangman in New Guinea, wears a mask & cloak to conceal his identity; When it was rumored that he was to share the Nobel Prize with Thomas Edison, Nikola Tesla refused to accept it; Snakes have no ears. They perceive sound vibrations with their tongues.
| 11 | Nick Webster | Marshall Flaum, Paul Boorstin, Jimmy Sangster, Leslie Gargan, David H. Vowell, and Nicholas Webster | December 19, 1982 |
The Real Man in the Iron Mask, Amsterdam Diamond manufacturing, Hope Diamond, Munich Aviary, ancient monuments Venice, Italy, Parthenon in Greece, The Last Supper (Leonardo da Vinci) in Milan, Italy, the Coliseum in Rome, Aswan Dam and Sphinx in Egypt, Caves of Lascaux, Legoland Billund Resort, dominoes. This episode featured footage from The Man in the Iron Mask and "Diamonds Are a Girl's Best Friend" sequence in Gentlemen Prefer Blondes.
| 12 | Irwin Rosten | Irwin Rosten, Leslie Gargan, David H. Vowell | January 9, 1983 |
The curse of the SS Great Eastern; A segment on unusual music includes giant alphorns of Switzerland; saxophonists in Venice, Italy; face slapping to Hungarian Rhapsody No. 2; music made by moistening rims of wine glasses. A look at bees includes the creation of hives; the roles of queens and workers; the production of honey; and monkeys on Gibraltar and in India and Japan. A feature on human flight includes aircraft built before that of the Wright Brothers. This episode featured footage of the Wright Brothers' early test flights. Bumper(s): In Hasaam, India, an entire tree trunk hollowed out and covered with skins is the largest drum in the world; Considering its size, shape, and wingspan, the bumblebee is an aerodynamic misfit and should be unable to fly; A space station envisioned in France 200 years ago, was shaped like a battleship to be lifted by a giant balloon.
| 13 | Mel Stuart | David H. Vowell, Jack Haley Jr. | January 16, 1983 |
An 1884 murder described by Edgar Allan Poe in 1837 in The Narrative of Arthur Gordon Pym of Nantucket. A segment on New York City oddities includes a wheat field near the base of the World Trade Center. A feature on amphibians includes the ridley turtle; the silius frog's incubation of its young; the mudskipper. A look at money and greed includes the handling of currency at a Federal Reserve Bank; a Japanese ritual to assure good fortune. Bumper(s): Peter Minuit, bought Manhattan island for $24 from the wrong tribe. The first recorded New York swindle; In 1950, Ben and Elinore Carlin crossed the Atlantic in an automobile; an amphibious jeep; Square gold coins issued in Denmark were so unpopular, the king had to make it a crime not to accept them.
| 14 | William Kronick | Paul Boorstin, Leslie Gargan, David H. Vowell, Jack Haley Jr. | January 23, 1983 |
A feature on sharks includes shark-hunting in New Guinea; the search for shark repellent. A segment on unusual sports includes Texas rattlesnake-sacking; boulder-throwing in Switzerland. Unusual museums include one depicting (in plaster) the Peruvian Inquisition; a carnival museum in Connecticut. Bumper(s): Even the sharks name has an evil connotation. It stems from the word schurke, which in German means "scoundrel"; attached to balloons, sportsmen in the 1920s could cover up to a quarter of a mile in a single leap; J. Paul Getty spent $16 million to build an art museum and never had time to visit it.
| 15 | Jack Haley Jr. | Irwin Rosten, David H. Vowell, Paul Boorstin | February 6, 1983 |
Segments on the miracle of Dunkirk; unusual military weapons, including the B-19; Christo's unconventional art (he wrapped the Australian coastline in plastic); Patton's WW2 "decoy army" (equipped with mock tanks and planes); a fiery Japanese rite of passage; and a Brazilian replica of Jerusalem. Bumper(s): PT Barnum exhibited a mermaid constructed of the remains of a fish and monkey, and people paid to see it; Paintings produced by a chimpanzee were actually exhibited at London's Royal Festival Hall; A gun invented in Germany during World War II, actually could shoot around a corner.
| 16 | Nicolas Noxon | Nicolas Noxon, David H. Vowell, Paul Boorstin | February 13, 1983 |
The Glory Hand (a.k.a. Hand of Glory). The Tomb of Sir Richard Burton. Segments on memorials built at the sites of accidents on Yugoslavian highways; houses built for the dead in Eastern European graveyards; African wild dogs; a dog that drives a car; Greyfriars Bobby; the V-1 and V-2 rockets of Nazi Germany, and their role in World War II; the cricket dancers of the South Pacific, who have embraced the British game of cricket as a tribal rite. Bumper(s): Confident of resurrection, Dr. John Brown of West Virginia, had himself buried upright in a coffin equipped with a window; In the 19th century, the Earl of Bridgewater dressed his pet dogs and dined with them daily; A rocket plane propelled by gunpowder was designed by a German army officer in 1847.
| 17 | Nick Webster | Paul Boorstin, David H. Vowell, Jimmy Sangster, Marshall Flaum | February 20, 1983 |
Segments on Major William Martin; the Marquis Chimps; a high-diving horse and rider; a wrestling bear; a flea circus; Stavelot Laetare des Blancs-Moussis; ceremonial masks, a Japanese religious ritual involving mud-throwing; a mock battle between St. George and the dragon; the discovery of Roman ruins in Bath, England; the Mayan Roman Baths; the mysterious Olmecs, whose city was found near Veracruz, Mexico. This episode featured footage of The Man Who Never Was. Bumper(s): In Pakistan, camels are sometimes trained to dance to the accompaniment of drums and bagpipes; A ceremonial costume worn by men for special occasions in the new Islands, is made entirely of cobwebs; In 1834, a treasure hunter dismantled an ancient pyramid. He found the treasure, but the world lost a pyramid.
| 18 | Unknown | Unknown | February 27, 1983 |
Reports on cryogenics; Morocco's killer scorpions; the fastest train in the world; acupuncture as an anesthetic during surgery; the eruption of Mount St. Helens.
| 19 | Irwin Rosten | Irwin Rosten, David H. Vowell | April 10, 1983 |
Reports on the man who spent a lifetime compiling the Oxford English Dictionary; a Greek fire-walking ritual honoring Christian saints; a mammal that must eat every two or three hours or die; a developing fetus filmed in the womb; high speed film; streaking fad; curse of Robert Todd Lincoln. Bumper(s): In Tibet, a polite way of saying 'Hello' is to stick out your tongue; The Okapi of Africa, once considered extinct, has a tongue that is over a foot long and blue; In World War II, homing pigeons were equipped with tiny cameras to take aerial photographs.
| 20 | Unknown | Unknown | April 17, 1983 |
Segments on the mysterious execution of Michel Ney, one of Napoleon's marshals; computerized weapons of the future, surfing in a man-made "ocean"; the wildlife of New York City; the Japanese art of creating "food for the eyes". Bumper(s): During World War 2, military experts considered using bats to carry incendiary bombs; camels once pulled a car without an engine to deliver the mail across an Australian desert; there are more pigeons in New York City than there are people in Reno, Nevada.
| 21 | Mel Stuart | David H. Vowell | May 5, 1983 |
A feature on Hollywood includes the history of the Hollywood Sign, movie star's real names and famous lines that were never spoken. Also: pigeon racing in Belgium; blackbirds that invaded a small town in North Carolina; a man who committed suicide with a deck of cards; a visit to Mecca. Bumper(s): As part of a religious ritual, the whirling dervishes of Turkey dance for hours while completely in a trance-like state; A sparrow has fourteen vertebrae in its neck. Twice as many as a giraffe; Mickey Rooney has been an entertainer in showbusiness since he was only fifteen months old.

=== Season 2 ===
| No. | Directed by | Written by | Original release date |
|---|---|---|---|
| 22 | Mel Stuart | David H. Vowell, Thomas Fuchs, Mel Stuart, Draper Lewis | September 25, 1983 |
The second season begins with a look at the legendary Ninja at the Iga-ryū Ninja Museum, Onagadori; Onagadori cocks, hunting practices of lions, bats, Amazon river "Big Noise" (a.k.a. pororoca); Mojave desert Creosote bush and King Clone; CMI (computer musical instrument); Laser harp; George Landry's LYRA; Blacksmiths forging contest Malibu, South African snake sit-in; tobacco spitting, Talico, Ca; freshwater salamander eating contest; Hubble Space Telescope; Wilson and Penzias radio telescope and the discovery of cosmic microwave background radiation; the sun; Edward Montagu, 1st Earl of Sandwich. Bumper(s): The tongue of the giant pirarucu fish of Brazil, is so rough, it is used by local Indians as sandpaper; This musical instrument, the flute, is not named after the person who invented it, but for the flounder, a Sicilian eel; In a contest in Atlantic City, New Jersey, Israel Weintraub consumed 146 clams in 20 minutes.
| 23 | Mel Stuart | William Kronick, Thomas Fuchs, David H. Vowell, Jack Haley Jr. | October 2, 1983 |
Rasputin assassination; Japanese tattoos; Sudanese (Masakan); Brazil (Krohole); Indian man with the longest fingernails; Asaro Mudmen in (Papua New Guinea); Ede & Ravenscroft limited wigs; birds of prey (Philippine eagle, marbled murrelet Corm in Peru, osprey); operating rooms; surgical techs; Dragon's Breath in China; Movieland Wax Museum; Rare photos and outtakes of "The Jitterbug" scene in The Wizard of Oz; the curse of the Elgin Marbles British Museum. NOTE: Series Executive Producer, Jack Haley Jr., was the son of Wizard of Oz star Jack Haley, who played the Tin Man. Bumper(s): In the late nineteenth century, fashionable English women applied their make-up permanently by tattooing lips, cheeks and eyebrows; The official name of an Australian bird that mimics other creatures including a barking dog is appropriately the male lyrebird; To protect themselves during a plague, doctors in 16th-century France wore leather noses in which they burned incense.
| 24 | Jack Haley Jr. | Irwin Rosten, Thomas Fuchs, David H. Vowell, Mel Stuart, Draper Lewis | October 9, 1983 |
Forty-seven rōnin commit Harakiri for avenging their lord, Asano Naganori; reptiles - including the Komodo dragon, alligators and snakes; water - a waterpark in San Dimas, California; hydro-therapy; water birthing; and celebrations - "trooping of the colors" in England, saints and snakes in Italy; "naked festivals" of Japan; and boat burning in the Shetland Islands; Also: ancient sports; puzzle solving. This episode features footage of Fred Balthazar swimming. Bumper(s): Snakes rarely freeze to death. They can be frozen stiff and still be revived with no serious ill effects; Fred Balthazar of Cocoa, Florida, swam the English Channel, covering a distance of 42 miles entirely underwater; As part of an annual celebration, the people of the Nicobar Islands dug up the skulls of their kin, and staged a parade.
| 25 | Jack Haley Jr. | Nicolas Noxon, David H. Vowell, Thomas Fuchs | October 23, 1983 |
Segments include the legend of Jesse James; a school where frogs are trained to jump; a man who teaches Italian gestures to the Swiss; hand fan and romance; insect mating rituals; the origin of the match; ritual fire dancing in Suriname; a high-rise fire that killed 179 people in São Paulo, Brazil; exotic foods; Chinese imperial banquet; Rum-running; Horatio Nelson's body shipped in brandy. This episode featured footage of Jesse James. Bumper(s): In the great Baltimore disaster of 1904, fire destroyed 84 city blocks without the loss of a single life; By appointment of her majesty, Queen Victoria of Great Britain, Englishman Jack Black was employed as a royal rat catcher; Typically German dish of sauerkraut, pickled cabbage, originated in ancient China.
| 26 | Jack Haley Jr. | Irwin Rosten, David H. Vowell, Thomas Fuchs, Draper Lewis, Jack Haley Jr. | October 30, 1983 |
A New Orleans murderer who uses an ax publicly announced he wouldn't kill people while they listened to jazz; Volcanoes - Hawaii's Kilauea Volcano (pelée) rocks taken home by tourist is thought to be bad luck, Bali volcano Gunung Agung and rituals to appease volcano gods, Swiss artist André Bucher sculpts with lava in Italy, Japanese jigoku in Beppu, Japan; disabled people - New Zealand Ken Smith building his home, Maria French and cerebral palsy; artist and advocate quadriplegic Robert Thome; an art masterpiece hanging in a variety store in Pasadena, Texas; a crystal skull called The Skull of Doom. Bumper(s): The eruption of Mount St. Helens created enough ashes of dust to cover Manhattan Island to a depth of 28 stories; Disabled Irish writer, Christy Brown wrote six books by typing with a little toe of his left foot; In Long View, Washington, squirrels have their own man made suspension bridge to cross a busy thoroughfare.
| 27 | Mel Stuart | David H. Vowell, Thomas Fuchs, Paul Boorstin, Mel Stuart | November 6, 1983 |
Segments include an autopsy performed on Charles Francis Hall, an Arctic explorer, 100 years after he died; the longest automobile in the world; apartments that rent for 66 cents a year; land shaping; Artists - neon art by or collected by Liliana Diane Lakich, cedars as works of art by Dudley Carter, French wood artist Christian Renonciat, Robert Smithson's Spiral Jetty in the Great Salt Lake, Utah, video art by South Korean artist Nam June Paik; The London Dungeon: Degradation, Damnation & Death museum of wax statues on torture devices; dogs - Nipper of His Master's Voice, Japanese dog yoga and burial, American dog cemetery in Wantagh, New York, Husky sled dogs in Alaska, wrestling Japanese Tosa dogs and Kenyan wild dogs; puzzle - egg into bottle trick.
| 28 | Mel Stuart | William Kronick, Thomas Fuchs, Draper Lewis, Jack Haley Jr., David H. Vowell. | November 13, 1983 |
A spy who operated undetected out of the British Embassy in Ankara, Turkey during World War II; a Hawaiian island place of refuge for criminals, Bolivian Indians in the Andes Mountains hit each other to ensure the future fertility of the soil, Japanese rituals to ensure a good fortune, and the running of the bulls in Pamplona, Spain; unique occupations - chicken gender determination, cleaning Brazil's the Christ the Redeemer, scale tester, Californian Hal Wright delivers a newspaper via airplane, World Trade Center commodities trading including coffee taste testers; horses - unusual horses, including the Lippizaners, bucking broncos, and Incitatus; dancers - tap dancer Gene Bell, Minneapolis tap dancing spectacle, Chinese stilt dancing, and New York City break dancing; Tho Parr 150-year-old man dies from kindness. Bumper(s): Men of the Biharis tribe of India, believe being suspended from a hook while wearing women's clothing is a cure for infertility; Sherpas, the professional porters of Nepal, use needle & thread to patch the flesh on soles of their feet; Veteran jockey, Bill Shoemaker has raced over 25,000 miles, a distance equal to the circumference of the earth.
| 29 | Mel Stuart | Nicolas Noxon, David H. Vowell, Thomas Fuchs, Paul Boorstin | November 20, 1983 |
Segments on the Heike crabs of Japan; which are believed to be the spirits of dead samurai; accident research at the National Bureau of Standards; an Irish monk who sailed to America 900 years before Columbus; the origin of Sid Grauman's Chinese Theatre in Hollywood. Bumper(s): Because so many drivers in Amsterdam accidentally plunge into canals, motorists are given special underwater escape courses; In 1916, in Tennessee, a rogue elephant that killed 3 people was sentenced to death and hanged; For 60 years, mysterious fireballs have appeared above Brown Mountain in North Carolina. No one has yet offered a proveable explanation.
| 30 | Nicholas Webster | Thomas Fuchs, David H. Vowell, William Kronick, Draper Lewis, Mel Stuart | November 27, 1983 |
Segments on Black Bart, a desperado with a penchant for penning pathetic poetry; revolutionary crime-fighting techniques and devices; airships including the LZ 129 Hindenburg; the monasteries atop the Meteora in Northeastern Greece; insects; David Rice Atchison. Bumper(s): The police box; chinch bugs; Charles Green had hot-air balloon flight with horse.
| 31 | Unknown | Unknown | December 4, 1983 |
Segments on a mountain climber who uses no equipment; Japanese "onsen" spas; a grueling run across Death Valley and back. Also a feature commemorating the attack on Pearl Harbor includes Doolittle's raid, Japanese balloon bombs.
| 32 | Mel Stuart | Paul Boorstin, David H. Vowell, Thomas Fuchs, Draper Lewis | December 11, 1983 |
Segments include a 17-year-old who forged a Shakespearean play in the 18th century; Adolf Hitler's toy cannon; a walking robot. Also: a feature on death rites includes the Tung Wah Coffin Home in Hong Kong; a Buddhist sect that weds the soul of the dead dolls. This episode was postponed from an earlier date (October 16, 1983) and featured footage of The Son of the Sheik. Bumper(s): Upon the death of a Japanese General, his 20-inch-long mustache was buried with full honors, in a separate casket; Eccentric Scotsman, Robert Ferry, saved money on his wardrobe by sometimes stealing clothes from his neighbors scarecrows.
| 33 | Unknown | Unknown | January 8, 1984 |
Contests segment with belly flopping, gurning, and stone jumping. Segments on the octopus, garden eel, shark and sea urchin; a South Pacific ritual in which men dive toward the ground held only by a vine that breaks their fall at the last moment; modern artists who craft their works using bubbles, rocks, automobiles, and TV sets; and a Chinese ritual involving papers stained with blood from a human tongue. A segment about John Patée lottery and the Patee House. Bumper(s): In a bubblegum contest, Mrs. Susan Williams (Susan Montgomery Williams) took 1st prize with a bubble extending over 19 inches in a diameter; Dolphins can find an underwater object, as small as a dime, even while blindfolded; In 1846, American artist John Banvard completed a portrait of the Mississippi River that was 1 mile long.
| 34 | John Peyser | William Kronick, David H. Vowell, Thomas Fuchs, Draper Lewis, Paul Boorstin | January 15, 1984 |
Joshua A. Norton or Norton I Emperor of the United States; Con artists, forgeries, and hoaxes - James Hydrick is a self-described psychic, Elsie Wright and Frances Griffiths claimed they had photographed fairies in 1917, Spanish master forger of producing paintings like Picasso; Cats - domestic, jaguar, and lions; The Mon Lei, a Chinese junk built for a warlord; the capture of a Nazi U-boat during World War II; explorer Thor Heyerdahl's Atlantic voyage in a reed boat; Deserts - Will Tuttle's desert near Freeport Maine, desert shrimps come to live, momentarily; a servant figures out how to get a jewel on a carpet and became an adviser to a king. Bumper(s): In Australia, ten dollar bills bare the portrait of Francis Greenway, who was deported from England for forgery; Americans spend over a billion dollars a year to buy a million tons of cat food; In 1860, a young drummer boy survived a shipwreck on Lake Michigan by using his drum as a life preserver.
| 35 | Roger Spottiswoode | Nicolas Noxon, Thomas Fuchs, David H. Vowell, Paul Boorstin, Draper Lewis | January 29, 1984 |
The story of the Hatfield–McCoy feud; China Camp State Park, San Rafael, CA (U.S.A.); Canterbury Shaker Village; Truganini in Tasmania; last of the Shakers; Shoichi Yokoi in Guam; Christopher Janney "Soundstair" (Musical Stairs) in Cambridge, MA (U.S.A.); Suzuki method music; Levi Celerio Filipino violinist; Kangaroo babies; Bulldog ants and larvae; Bison calves; John Milburn Davis Memorial gravesite; Dali people mourning; Chinese graves; a Manila cemetery suburb; Raymond Tse Mercedes Benz tombstone; Toraja graveyard; non-linear thinking. Bumper(s): In detainee region of Sahara Desert, a single tree is the last vegetation for 600 miles; Every album ever made by the Beatles sold over a million copies; In India, husbands & wives who want children whisper their wishes in the ear of a sacred cow.
| 36 | John Peyser | David H. Vowell, Thomas Fuchs | February 5, 1984 |
Operation Valkyrie; The century cactus; South Koreans celebrate the Moses Miracle at Jindo Island; The echidna; diving bell spider; African Vadoma tribe of two-toes people; World Eskimo-Indian Olympic Games; Wushu; Landfills and garbage collection; University of Arizona garbologists; Sewage treatment in San Diego using hyacinths; Lufkin, Texas, sewage treatment using worms; Los Angeles sculptor makes sculptures from garbage; Man juggles bowling balls, flaming swords, and a chainsaw with two apples; Fire-breather street performer in Mexico City; Juggler balances a person in a chair on his chin; Artist recreates Michaelangelo paintings on Paris sidewalks; Benjamin Banneker's involvement in Washington, DC. Bumper(s): The glass snake is so fragile that if it is touched its tail falls off; To celebrate his victories a Mongolian conqueror played polo with the heads of the conquered generals; In Bangkok, the Wat Arun temple is covered with broken dishes.
| 37 | Mel Stuart | Nicolas Noxon, David H. Vowell, Thomas Fuchs, Paul Boorstin | February 26, 1984 |
Segments include Edgar Allan Poe's fear of being buried alive; traditions for exorcising evil spirits in Spain (Cascamorras), Switzerland (Silvesterklaus), and Hong Kong (Cheung Chau Bun Festival); a fighting-spider tournament; new technologies that aid the handicapped; the Dickin Medal, awarded to animal war heroes; New York's Hurley's saloon, built in 1870; hoarders Collyer brothers in 1947; dilapidated South Bronx John Fekner designs; 1691 8th NYC governor Edward Hyde, 3rd Earl of Clarendon and painting of Queen Anne. Bumper(s): Tradition sometimes requires women of the Multalunas tribe of Columbia to dance while carrying the bones of deceased relatives; In the 1740s, a blind English policeman was credited with identifying thousands of thieves by their voices alone; Because of the pull of the moon, the Empire State Building rises and falls about 18 inches every day.
| 38 | Unknown | Unknown | February 28, 1984 |
Segments on the unusual odyssey of Eva Peron's corpse; giant vegetables; an experiment with plants hooked up to a polygraph to determine if they feel pain. Also: a feature on earthquakes.
| 39 | Unknown | Unknown | March 4, 1984 |
Segments include dining in the Space Shuttle's galley; researching dinosaurs; the Spruce Goose, Howard Hughes' wooden plane; performing animals. A report on unusual foods features such delicacies as deep-dried rat, beetle sausage.
| 40 | John Peyser | David H. Vowell, Thomas Fuchs, Paul Boorstin, Mel Stuart | March 11, 1984 |
El Cid of Portugal; Inuit diet and hunting; Modern English people living as the ancient English did; The Washington memorial and Monument; the Treasury Department; President Monroe's house; The United States Capitol; Mount Rushmore; Hananuma Masakichi in Yokohama in Japan; Festival of Bachelors in Lisdoonvarna Ireland; Shashthipurti rituals in India; Meoto Iwa in Japan; Wind farm at Cuttyhunk Island; Inventor James L. Amick's wind-powered car; a solar-powered car; Solar 1 generator; solar-powered devices; paper loop trick. This episode featured footage of El Cid. Bumper(s): To survive a shipwreck in 1974, a determined woman clung to the backs of two seagoing turtles; In the United States, one city has more psychiatrists per capita than any other, Washington, DC (USA); At weddings in Borneo, a human skull was once part of the ceremony to symbolize love outlasted death.
| 41 | Unknown | Unknown | April 8, 1984 |
Segments include Hetty Green, who was known as the "Witch of Wall Street" because of her financial acumen; the Tiger Balm Gardens, a sprawling park in Hong Kong; the migration of the monarch butterfly; a lottery for burial plots; a floating city of the future. Bumper(s): In India, a holy man attracts pilgrims who come to the Ganges river, by burying his head in the sand; To navigate over long distances, homing pigeons have a built-in compass. Magnetic material embedded in nerve tissue; In Mexico, skulls made of hard candy bearing the initials of the deceased are kept as sentimental souvenirs.
| 42 | Nick Webster | David H. Vowell, Thomas Fuchs, Draper Lewis, Mel Stuart | May 6, 1984 |
Segments on King Ferdinand II of Aragon and Queen Juana of Spain, who was driven mad by love; the development and use of the atomic bomb; Hiroshima; surgical implants that relieve arthritis pain; video-game therapy; early brain scanning; hypnotism with treatment. A feature on construction feats includes Washington Roebling and the origin of the Brooklyn Bridge and the Great Wall of China. Asmat people and unique totems and carvings; fingernail artist; ritual pilgrimage with head shaving in India; the Pony Express. This episode featured footage of Col. Paul Tibbets and the Enola Gay. Bumper(s): As an aid in the treatment of sore backs, an 18th-century inventor developed an elaborate back rubbing machine; In Australia, a fence built to protect sheep is over 4,500 miles longer than the Great Wall of China.
| 43 | John Peyser | Irwin Rosten, David H. Vowell, Thomas Fuchs, Paul Boorstin, Draper Lewis | May 13, 1984 |
Segments include the 1911 theft of the Mona Lisa from the Louvre; sleep research; facial surgery; man-made natural oddities; an artificial hand; a circular car; and a vending machine that pays out money. Also: rarebirds and the Salem witch trials. Bumper(s): In medieval Europe, medical practitioners created a potent nostrum by grinding up fragments of mummies; To cross over the Himalaya mountains from India into Nepal, automobiles once were carried by porters; Inventors have piled plans of the U.S. Patent Office for over 300 devices designed to stop snoring.

=== Season 3 ===
| No. | Directed by | Written by | Original release date |
|---|---|---|---|
| 44 | Mel Stuart | David H. Vowell, Thomas Fuchs, Mel Stuart | September 23, 1984 |
Segments in the third-season opener include a horned toad that survived 31 years in a time capsule; training procedures at the Los Angeles Police Academy; advances in medical technology providing new treatments for kidney stones and tumors; recordings attached to the Voyager space vehicles; mushrooms.
| 45 | Mel Stuart | David H. Vowell, Thomas Fuchs, Don Hall | October 7, 1984 |
Getting an egg in a bottle out trick; Virginia City; Nevada Delta Saloon slot machines; gambling surveillance systems; Murph Stewart Dice inspector; Card Mechanic Richard Turner; a Faro suicide table; Maurice Ravel and the left-handed (concerto); armless Andy Detwiler; cerebral palsy songwriter Wayne Pronger; Mount of Olives; Monastery in Sicily catacombs; shrine 431 steps temple of 10 thousand Buddha's; morticians restorative art; poisonous frogs; water walker spider; the mating ritual of the bird of paradise; frill-necked lizard inspired Japanese dance; Walter Raleigh's severed head and legend of laying down his cloak for Elizabeth I of England. This episode was postponed from an earlier date (September 30, 1984). Bumper(s): In his will, a dedicated gambler specified burial in a special coffin, sitting up at a card table w/ a deck of cards close at hand; A blind man sailed from San Francisco to Hawaii; English eccentric Richard Howell specified in his will he be buried on horseback upside down.
| 46 | Mel Stuart | Don Hall, Thomas Fuchs, David H. Vowell, Mel Stuart | October 14, 1984 |
Animal group names; museum of man in Paris; Paul Bairoch; Study on brains; Electronic brain for blind; training center for hearing ear dog; sea turtles who are ill; Bird Street in Hong Kong; protection of golden eagles; Employee Mural Art in Vernon, California Paper Bag Factory; Chan painting in China; jet engine artist; desert majesty art; the Le Bateau Matisse painting upside down at MOMA; Mount Moriah; Shinbyu at the Shwedagon Pagoda; the pilgrimage to The Cristo Negro of Esquipulas; the death of Cardinal Thomas Wolsey because of William Kingston's name. Bumper(s): The brain is the most complex of human organs, but almost 75% of it is water; To predict earthquakes, the U.S. government science study behavior of mice & kangaroo rats; In China, artist Huang Ernan; created masterpieces by painting on silk with his tongue.
| 47 | Mel Stuart | Thomas Fuchs, Don Hall, David H. Vowell, Draper Lewis | October 21, 1984 |
Judge Roy Bean; Roman food tasters, Snake fang tester and venom collector, Belgium bomb disposal squad, English Steeplejack, Fred Dibnah;, Japanese pullulan food sheets, Dabbawala in Bombaby, India, Jumiles in Taxco, Mexico, CZimmer's Game and Seafood in Lockport, Ill; potato powered clock; blue whales; curious dolphins in Monkey Mia; Killer whales; Imperial Easter Egg of 1893; Fabergé eggs; diamond jubilee March 1946; Gem mining in Columbia; oyster farming; and Imperial Crown duplicate; PT Barnum's egress sign. Bumper(s): To assist an attorney in accident cases, Stuntman Alan Gibbs, duplicates the details of dangerous crashes; In 1977 Texan Steve Weldon consumed under 100 yards of spaghetti in 29 seconds; An Arctic whale called a Narwhal has a spiral tusk that can be as long as 8 feet long.
| 48 | Mel Stuart | David H. Vowell, Thomas Fuchs, Don Hall, Mel Stuart | October 28, 1984 |
A curse of Aztec Sea god Quetzalcoatl led to Hernán Cortés; Penicillin discovery; tongue surgery on Down Syndrome; Dr. Han Schemedal neuro-electrical (bionic) hand; blood transfusion; Dr. Charles R. Drew and blood plasma discovery; Hanover, N.H. (U.S.) snow and ice lab; Harbin International Ice and Snow Sculpture Festival in Northern China; Swiss Alps avalanches; Nenana Ice Classic lottery in Alaska; liquid nitrogen; a three-bedroom house built in less than seven hours; beer can house; architect of Eiffel Tower apartment on the 4th floor; a laundry that washes money in San Francisco's Westin St. Francis hotel; Hallstatt painted skulls ossuary; SC Johnson insecticide laboratory; match-tester Burt Wilkinson; Victor Hugo short letter writing. This episode featured footage of the Italian Front in the Alpines Bumper(s): In England in 1652 ordinary coffee was once advertised as a cure for gout and scurvy; If the snow & ice melted at the South Pole, it could flood every coastal city on earth; The Slovak Radio Building.
| 49 | Mel Stuart | Nicolas Noxon, David H. Vowell, Thomas Fuchs | November 4, 1984 |
Joan of Arc was not burned at the stake and was of royal blood; George Washington and Adolf Hitler's teeth; Pygmies human teeth sharpening; artist of teeth; daredevil museum in Niagara Falls, Ny; Japanese elimination contest; the fortress at Masada; the lost temple of Akhenaten; underwater ship graveyard in Chuuk Lagoon; insects used in maceration for museums; Hell money rituals in Hong Kong; man grinds beef oil and predicts tornadoes; candle wicks. This episode featured footage of Joan of Arc. Bumper(s): To keep them in good health, some sheep in Great Britain, had been fitted with false teeth; As part of his act, stuntman Edward Gibson (Hoot Gibson) had 60 pins stuck into his face and body; Constructed over 4700 years ago, the elephantine road in Egypt is the oldest highway in the world.
| 50 | Mel Stuart | David H. Vowell, Don Hall, Thomas Fuchs | November 11, 1984 |
Paper and a paperclip trick; Obsessions: Skull of French Count "Béthune Palone", home covered in jigsaw puzzles, artist John Perry, painter of whales; fishing with a kite; torture tests for household appliances (UL); military experts setting off a large conventional explosion called Operation Dice Throw of the Misty Castle series; hunting for spider webs; Fillmore fish hatchery; salmon struggling to reach their spawning ground; the top-secret preparations for the D-day invasion; books made of wood pulp. Bumper(s): Francis “Frank” Butland, British gourmet, tasted just about anything, including marinated mice on buttered toast; To test safes, a laboratory freezes them, bakes them, and drops them from the height of a three-story building; The password used by U.S. armed forces during the invasion of Normandy on D-Day was Mickey Mouse.
| 51 | John Peyser | Thomas Fuchs, David H. Vowell, Don Hall | November 18, 1984 |
Typhoid Mary; Explosives Marcelo Ramos; Controlled Demolition, Inc.; Double Dutch at Lincoln Center; thoroughbreds; cheetah w/ tiger stripes; Walking catfish; Dougal Dixon; Johann Ludwig Burckhardt rediscovered Petra; the Anasazi; a vacuum & cork trick. Bumper(s): For 300 years after they invented it, the Chinese used gunpowder not to make weapons, but to make firecrackers; An annual race is conducted in Deming, New Mexico to determine the fleetest of foot among domesticated ducks; The leaping two inch Jerboas of Australia can jump as high as six feet in a single bound.
| 52 | John Peyser | David H. Vowell, Thomas Fuchs, Don Hall | November 25, 1984 |
Balloon puncture trick; U.S. Navy survival training; British Royal Tournament; baseball for blind National Beep Baseball Association; handicapped man competes in Paralympic Games; Stephen Hawking; soil samples from Mars; a volcanic eruption on a moon of Jupiter; the Moon landing; astronauts training for zero gravity; Space Flight Operations Facility; a rooftop garden in New York City; a machine that picks apples; using corn smut in Mexico; how a grammatical error cost $2 million. This episode featured footage of the Apollo 14 mission. Bumper(s): During World War II, a pinup photograph of actress Betty Grable was used to teach flyers how to read aerial maps; A Chinese scientist attempted to ride a rocket-powered chair to the Moon, over a hundred years ago.
| 53 | Mel Stuart | Thomas Fuchs, Don Hall, David H. Vowell | December 2, 1984 |
Included: D.H. Lawrence's final resting place; a painless way to gather wool from sheep in Australia; Jerusalem's sacred Western Wall; milking cows by computer in Holland; how to make fertilizer; a valuable garbage dump; how to make a bulletproof window; luring rats to their deaths.
| 54 | Mel Stuart | Thomas Fuchs, David H. Vowell, Don Hall, Mel Stuart, Paul Boorstin | December 9, 1984 |
Included: how America was named; a fire that burned for eight months; living recreations of famous paintings; an artist who paints with cobwebs; the mechanical art of Survival Research Laboratories; triskaidekaphobia, the fear of the number 13; a high-stakes poker game pitting a man against a computer; a tower built as a home for bats; why $500 million is gathering dust in storage; how Leonardo kept his ideas secret. Bumper(s): To escape High-Rise fires, an inventor in 1879 patented parachute which attached with a chin-strap; Italian artist, Mario V uses the ink of live squids to create works of art; In England, a corpse of a dead gambler was displayed in a window so that his friends could collect his winnings.
| 55 | John Peyser | Nicolas Noxon, David H. Vowell, Thomas Fuchs, Don Hall | December 16, 1984 |
Included: the friendship of Henry Ford and Thomas Edison; the Fourth of July; how the New Year is celebrated in Japan; 10 days in history that have been lost forever; art of camouflage; how skiers keep in shape during the summer; sky divers performing at 14,000 feet. Bumper(s): To devout followers of the Shinto religion in Japan, Thomas Edison is worshipped as the god of electricity; In the 1920s, sportsmen attached themselves to balloons to leap almost a quarter of a mile in a single bound; To protect itself, the horned toad squirts blood as far as five feet, from its eyes.
| 56 | Jack Haley Jr. | David H. Vowell, Thomas Fuchs, Jack Haley Jr., Draper Lewis | January 6, 1985 |
Segments include crime-prevention techniques; reconstructing faces from skulls; how a slave won freedom with a snake bite; controlling the weather; how to make sea water drinkable; a customized Mercedes-Benz with a TV and fireplace; milk-carton boats; water that can cut through steel. Bumper(s): In 1982, government agents discovered that counterfeit $100 bills were being printed in a prison; In Paris in 1910, a painting won praise until the artist was revealed to be a donkey; Fire completely destroyed an ice house in Colorado without melting the mountain of ice it contained.
| 57 | Unknown | Unknown | January 13, 1985 |
Segments include a computer that helps create speech for the disabled; a scheme to sell the Eiffel Tower for scrap iron; F-15 pilots in mock aerial combat; how America saved the French wine industry; a pumpkin that weighs some 550 pounds. Bumper(s): As a training exercise, swimmers once suspended themselves on special racks to practice the proper moves; In China, soup made from steaks is considered to be a meal and a medicine.
| 58 | Mel Stuart | David H. Vowell, Thomas Fuchs | January 27, 1985 |
The discovery of the Dead Sea Scrolls; armor for an elephant; a 13-year-old test pilot; James Joyce and the longest passage in English literature; solar -powered planes; endangered turtles; CPR; arthroscopic knee surgery. Bumper(s): British eccentric, Henry Cope, was so obsessed with green that he would eat nothing but green fruits and vegetables; In England, in the 18th century, snails were boiled in tea water as a remedy for chest congestion; In Brazil, a rhinoceros was nominated for public office and won more votes than any other candidate.
| 59 | Unknown | Unknown | February 3, 1985 |
Segments on sleep research; Einstein's brain; a wedding performed in a tub; how visual brain waves can assist the handicapped; a Japanese ritual battle to ensure a bountiful harvest; a mountain village where people dress up as wild bears; a fish that lives in the desert.
| 60 | Mel Stuart | David H. Vowell, Thomas Fuchs, Mel Stuart, Don Hall | February 10, 1985 |
Pulling a dollar bill between two bottles trick; Segments on sacred sites and rituals in Jerusalem; Absalom's tomb, water baptism in the River Jordan, 7 martyrs church of Saint Saba, via dolorosa; ruins of Herod's second temple; words pronunciation; Missouri auction school; a Japanese rite dedicated to the sound of laughter; Vivian Fisher, a man who can imitate the sounds of musical instruments; devices for seeing in the dark (Infrared vision and Night vision); wildlife in darkness (Flashlight Fish, Fireflies, Foxes, and Bats); AMKUS pump; how firefighters rescue victims trapped in car wrecks; Pascal's calculator. Bumper(s): One ornithologist, Horatio Q. Birdbath can mimic the sounds of 300 different bird calls; In Waitomo, New Zealand, a cave is illuminated by millions of glow worms.
| 61 | John Peyser | Thomas Fuchs, David H. Vowell, Mel Stuart | February 17, 1985 |
Water optical trick; E.E. Cummings 1922 French Poem CHANSONS INNOCENTES; A transcontinental humming exercise w/ Bonnie Barnett; Fastest speaker Tom Adams; Sound poets Charles Stein and George Quasha; Knot's Berry Farm Haunted Shack; University of Edinburgh motion research; hypnotism w/ psychiatrist Martin Orne; Dice; Wong Tai Sin Temple; Tribal Bingo in (Cherokee, NC); Corning Museum of Glass; Yuichiro Miura Skied down Mount Everest; Edwin Boring and the ambiguous drawing My Wife and My Mother-in-Law. This episode featured footage from documentary The Man Who Skied Down Everest, about Miura. Bumper(s): A holy man began a chant which his followers continued for 13 years; The walls and columns of the Lincoln Memorial lean inward but appear straight; Charles Wells broke the Monte Carlo Casino and died penniless.
| 62 | John Peyser | Nicholas Noxon, David H. Vowell, Thomas Fuchs | February 24, 1985 |
Prince Lorenzo de' Medici; positive thinking; Japanese domino toppling champion; Color Blindness; JLS contact lenses; vocal chord surgery; muscle grafting; reconstructive microsurgery; cockroaches; Japanese giant wasps; the 1984 Australian mice plague; antique stores; Metro Zoo Miami, Fl - "Urban Man" Vidal, Albert; Moses the paper bag hat artist; Calcio Fiorentino in Florence, Italy; A Ripley's Believe It Or Not! cartoon led to "The Star-Spangled Banner" becoming the U.S. national anthem; square bullet reason for Puckle gun. Bumper(s): In China & Korea dominoes are used as a way to foretell the future; Doctors once prescribed metal collars w/ thumb screws for patients with stiff necks; There are about 7,000,000 bats in NYC - and only one person to patrol them.
| 63 | John Peyser | Thomas Fuchs, David H. Vowell | March 3, 1985 |
John Sutter and the origin of Sacramento, California; Douglas DC-3 plane; The city that inspired the mythical kingdom of Shangri-La, Lhasa; the Dalai Lama's route to exile through the Himalayas; San Diego Zoo nursery and (orangutans, tigers, pygmy hippo, spotted leopard, and tapir); Vancouver Aquarium and beluga whale giving birth; Serengeti National Park; Moses Coates apple peeler; Henry Ford museum; an early computerized photo alteration program; an eye typing program; MIT artificial intelligence; Henry J. Wooldridge gravesite monuments; Hong Kong burials; Fol-Sang dong chung; (place of little heaven) Qilakitsoq, Greenland; voices in relation to air. This episode featured footage from the film Lost Horizon. Bumper(s): The kiwi bird is about the size of a chicken but lays eggs ten times as large;
| 64 | Mel Stuart | David H. Vowell and Thomas Fuchs | March 10, 1985 |
The Dead Sea; Bonsai trees; mangled money; professional venom collectors; Nethercutt Collection in Sylmar, Ca; car customizer Dean Jeffries; low-rider competition; junkyard artist Jim Gary; National Severe Storms Forecast Center predicts violent weather; Elis Stenman's Paper house in Rockport, Mass; Ant Lovack French Riviera house; Empress Dowager Cixi's Marble Boat; origin of the Statue of Liberty and its French duplicate; Sea Cucumber in Steinhart Aquarium in San Francisco. Bumper(s): Thomas Paine, famous as a pamphleteer during the American Revolution was originally a corset maker; Ronald Coltsnov of Los Scat Ca, adorned his car with 1,045 plastic horses; Chinese experts claim that the leaves on ancient trees in China change colors to predict the weather.
| 65 | Alan Cooke | Nicolas Noxon, David H. Vowell, Thomas Fuchs, Mel Stuart | March 31, 1985 |
Cellist Anton Fils ate spiders regularly; Protective glass, Nuclear safety canisters; crash testing; chemo luminescent glow stick; crossword puzzles and the American Crossword Puzzle Tournament; Diaper Derby; the Lake Biwa Birdman Rally hang-gliding contest; Brahma pyramid (a.k.a. Tower of Hanoi); a deep-sea dive to retrieve the gold treasure aboard HMS Edinburgh; laser-beam technology; ice-cube, salt, and thread trick. Bumper(s): In New York State, some supermarkets have installed seat belts for children on shopping carts; An airborne competition in the 1920s daredevils played tennis on the wings of high flying aircraft; To lift priceless porcelain from the bottom of Japan's Seto Inland Sea, treasure hunters attached ropes to octopus.

=== Season 4 ===
| No. | Directed by | Written by | Original release date |
|---|---|---|---|
| 66 | Mel Stuart | David H. Vowell, Thomas Fuchs, Mel Stuart | September 29, 1985 |
Marie Osmond joins as host in the 4th season opener. Segments include Famous faces adorn U.S. currency; hypnotism in dental science; Hugo Ball Dadaism poetry; sound poets The Four Horsemen in Toronto; Marfortadowg (festival of free screaming) in Italy; NASA Space Training Center and Manned Maneuvering Unit in Denver; Kevin Clarke and the 5-year photographic journey of a red couch across America; Thailand chef Klinmahon. Note: Marie Osmond's take on the Hugo Ball poem "karawane", was later used on a cd companion to the 1989 book Lipstick Traces: A Secret History of the 20th Century by music critic Greil Marcus. Bumper(s): A West African python can tie itself into such a tight knot, it can roll like a bowling ball; Nose prints were at one time used to identify dogs on insurance policies; Florida diver Spencer Slate feeds a deadly 85 pound barracuda by letting it eat from his own mouth.
| 67 | Mel Stuart | Thomas Fuchs, David H. Vowell | October 6, 1985 |
An Italian inventor who bilked the French government of $100 million; a Japanese game show that tests contestants courage; automobile safety equipment; scientific technology to aid the disabled; a man who collects junk mail; a woman who designed a Victorian mansion from her dreams and nightmares: The Winchester Mystery House; a windmill restorer. Bumper(s): The albatross can fly for six days without beating its wings, and sometimes even goes to sleep in mid-air; Although far from any river, fresh fish are caught in the water holes of the Sahara desert; In the late 1780s, a performing pig in England became a sensation by solving mathematical problems.
| 68 | John Peyser | Nicolas Noxon, David H. Vowell and Thomas Fuchs | October 13, 1985 |
Postage stamp collecting - a 1918 upside-down plane postage stamp, a British Guiana stamp, Hitler's stamp made him a multi-millionaire; The dead-letter office of the New York General Post Office; unusual bronzed mementos; a London shoe store that requires an appointment for fitting; the hay-fever helmet; a French boy, "Julia Dauphin," born with a compromised immune system; a car shredder. Bumper(s): Scientists have combined the cells of a tomato and a cow to create the first vegetable that is also part animal; A parade in Sri Lanka features fifty richly decorated elephants in a celebration to honor a tooth of Buddha; To protect a valuable ring, a jeweler displayed it inside an aquarium filled with deadly piranha fish.
| 69 | John Peyser | David H. Vowell, Thomas Fuchs, Mel Stuart | October 27, 1985 |
A fatal downbeat struck by orchestra conductor Jean-Baptiste Lully; a musical number that can be performed by anyone on any instrument (John Cage's 4′33″); Performance art - (Tehching Hsieh) and Linda Montano are connected by a piece of rope for one year, sculptor Duane Hanson; the development of commercial aviation; aircraft safety; an autopsy performed on a 2500-year-old corpse. Bumper(s): Abstract artist Niki de Saint Phalle transforms objects into works of art, by firing a shotgun at them; To test toilets, a New Jersey company installed 60 in an 11-story tower and flushed them all at once; In England, during the late 1500s, women who adorned themselves with wigs and makeup, were subject to punishment as witches.
| 70 | Mel Stuart | Thomas Fuchs, David H. Vowell, Mel Stuart | November 10, 1985 |
Included: a 1916 quarter that was recalled for being indecent; the museum of mummies in Guanajuato, Mexico; human remains that are launched into orbit; revolutionary medical devices; the Russian space program; sonic sculpture; the unique sound of the Stradivarius violin; a natural art treasure. This episode featured footage from Sputnik 1, Neil Armstrong, and Yuri Gagarin space launch. Bumper(s): A recent study has revealed that some 30% of all office workers suffer from cyberphobia, the fear of computers; To provide raw material for anti-venom vaccine, Russ Lambert of Toledo, Ohio, captures and sells live wasps; Some of the first automobiles were decorated with horses heads to prevent frightening real horses.
| 71 | Unknown | David H. Vowell, Thomas Fuchs, Mel Stuart | November 17, 1985 |
Adolf Hitler and the Degenerate Art Exhibition; Johnson Space Center (Voice Command Center); Martine Kempf, inventor of Katalavox which operates machines by voice; turtle collector in Fountain Valley, Ca; a dog that skis and dives; Homing pigeons deliver film for photographer; Air Craft Carriers; Poet Renee Vivien; Eric Staller light art; Boston artist Silvana Cenci "Wheels in Motion" art piece created by explosives; orchards are watered with sensors in France. Bumper(s): The teeth of a vampire bat is so sharp, it can bite into a sleeping victim without being detected; A volcanic flow near Bend, Oregon created a river of obsidian glass 1 1/2 miles long; When angered the male sea elephant inflates its nose until it is 20 inches long.
| 72 | John Peyser | Thomas Fuchs, Nicolas Noxon, Mel Stuart, David H. Vowell | November 24, 1985 |
Included: the development of television; the man who pioneered the study of the human stomach; Soviet Russian assembly-line eye microsurgery; the world's largest TV set in Japan; widely held myths about Old West legends; a "bee beard" contest; Cleopatra's asp. Bumper(s): At La Crosse, Wisconsin, the bridge across the Mississippi river was forced to close by gigantic swarms of invading flies; The New York site occupied by St. Patricks cathedral was sold to the church in 1857 for only one dollar; Some superstitious Hong Kong drivers are paid more than $44,000 for lucky number license plates.
| 73 | Mel Stuart | David H. Vowell, Thomas Fuchs | December 1, 1985 |
Segments on how a gallery owner sparked public interest in an ignored painting; mud-bog racing; motorists who pray at the Temple of Safe Driving in Japan; the Franklin alphabet; miniature artwork; British Royal Marine basic training; a mystic artist; restoration of Leonardo's The Last Supper. Bumper(s): One of the first record players, the gramophone, looked like a sewing machine, you played it with your feet; A computer chip, the size of a sugar cube could contain all the information in the library of congress; In the ancient cities of France, human skulls were installed in stone walls to ward off evil spirits.
| 74 | Mel Stuart | David H. Vowell, Thomas Fuchs | December 8, 1985 |
A 75-year-old fake newspaper story that caused a Texas town to be torn apart; using hypnotism to control and prevent pain; a thermography machine; Arabian courtship customs; George Willig's illegal climb up the outside of the World Trade Center; rock climbing without equipment; cliff parachuting; an 18-year-old deaf woman studying to be a musician; the Leaning Tower of Pisa. Bumper(s): To honor her deceased husband, a widow built a 70-room California Mansion, in which no one has ever lived; As weapons of war, explosives were first used by the Chinese over 700 years ago; A Manhattan store once sold 35 ounce packages of ice chipped from icebergs, for $7 each.
| 75 | Unknown | Unknown | January 30, 1986 |
Included: a man who bilked the Portuguese treasury out of $15 million; modern-life sculptor Red Grooms; a man who claims to be the fastest messenger-service deliveryman in New York; a tarantula ranch; fish-smelling experts of Federal Food and Drug Administration; amputee Jeff Keith's run across America; training for Russian circus performers; the ancient Chinese discipline of gong fu; exploring the ocean floor; and a walking stick made of cabbage stalks. This episode was postponed from December 15, 1985.
| 76 | Unknown | Unknown | February 6, 1986 |
Segments include the "best-kept secret" of World War II; medicines derived from plants and insects; acupressure therapy; Buddhist monks of the Mount Koya monastery in Japan; altering the body's internal biological clock; a monument to a war hero who became a turncoat; the Corn Palace in Mitchell, South Dakota; a man who dives for golf balls lost in water hazards. Bumper(s): To set a world record, a teenager in Sri Lanka spoke non-stop for 159 hours; In the late 1800s Carl Herman Unthan performed violin concerts by playing with his feet; In Australia, Wendy Hall turned in record time 28.2 seconds to win a bed making contest.
