= Maceration =

Maceration may refer to:

- Maceration (cooking), in food preparation
- Maceration (wine), a step in wine-making
  - Carbonic maceration, a wine-making technique
- Maceration (sewage), in sewage treatment
- Maceration (bone), a method of preparing bones
- Acid maceration, the use of an acid to extract micro-fossils from rock
- Maceration, in chemistry, a method of extraction
- Skin maceration, in dermatology, the softening and whitening of skin that is kept constantly wet
- Maceration, in poultry farming, a method of chick culling
