= Masakichi =

- Gender: Male

Origin
- Origin: Japanese
- Meaning: Different meanings depending on the kanji used

Masakichi (written: 政吉) is a masculine Japanese given name. Notable people with the name include:

- Hananuma Masakichi (花沼 政吉; 1832–1895), Japanese sculptor
- Masakichi Inoue (井上 政吉; 1886–1975), Japanese general

== See also ==
- 5822 Masakichi, a main-belt asteroid
