= Forensic entomological decomposition =

Aspect of forensic science

Forensic entomological decomposition is how insects decompose and what that means for timing and information in criminal investigations. Medicolegal entomology is a branch of forensic entomology that applies the study of insects to criminal investigations, and is commonly used in death investigations for estimating the post-mortem interval (PMI). One method of obtaining this estimate uses the time and pattern of arthropod colonization. This method will provide an estimation of the period of insect activity, which may or may not correlate exactly with the time of death. While insect successional data may not provide as accurate an estimate during the early stages of decomposition as developmental data, it is applicable for later decompositional stages and can be accurate for periods up to a few years.

== Decomposition ==
Decomposition is a continuous process that is commonly divided into stages for convenience of discussion. When studying decomposition from an entomological point of view and for the purpose of applying data to human death investigations, the domestic pig Sus scrofa (Linnaeus) is considered to be the preferred human analogs. In entomological studies, five stages of decomposition are commonly described: (1) Fresh, (2) Bloat, (3) Active Decay, (4) Advanced or Post Decay, (5) Dry Remains. While the pattern of arthropod colonization follows a reasonably predictable sequence, the limits of each stage of decomposition will not necessarily coincide with a major change in the faunal community. Therefore, the stages of decomposition are defined by the observable physical changes to the state of the carcass. A pattern of insect succession results as different carrion insects are attracted to the varying biological, chemical and physical changes a carcass undergoes throughout the process of decay.

A decaying carcass provides "a temporarily, rapidly changing resource which supports a large, dynamic arthropod community." – M. Grassberger and C. Frank

=== Fresh stage ===
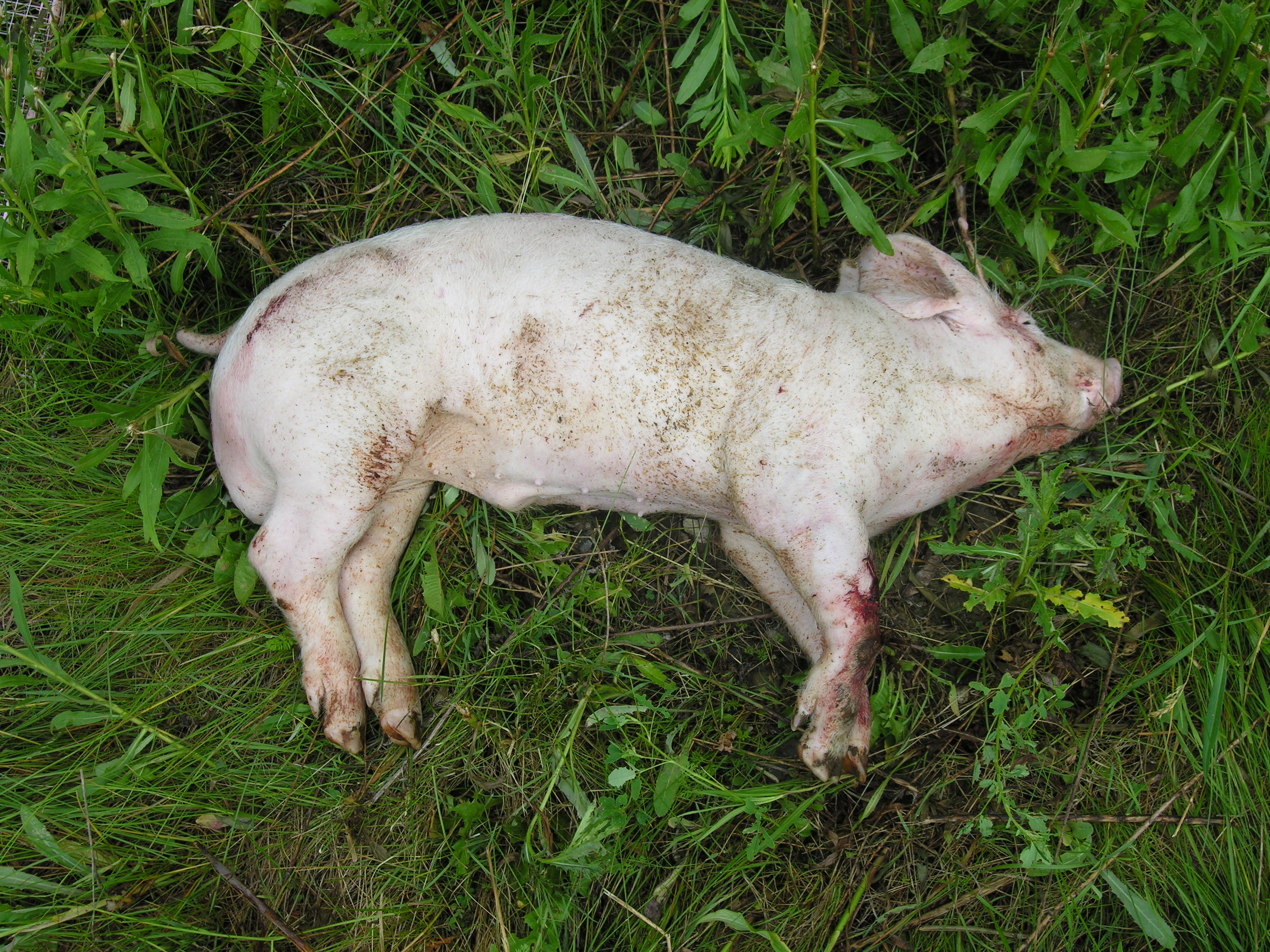
Pig carcass in the fresh stage of decomposition

The fresh stage of decomposition is generally described as the period between the moment of death and when the first signs of bloat are apparent. There are no outward signs of physical change, though internal bacteria have begun to digest organ tissues. No odor is associated with the carcass. Early post-mortem changes, used by pathologists as medical markers for early post-mortem interval estimations, have been described by Goff and include livor mortis, rigor mortis and algor mortis.

The first insects to arrive at decomposing remains are usually Calliphoridae, commonly referred to as blow flies. These flies have been reported to arrive within minutes of death or exposure, and deposit eggs within 1–3 hours. Adult flies of the families Sarcophagidae (flesh flies) and Muscidae are also common in this first stage of decomposition. First eggs are laid in or near the natural orifices of the head and anus, as well as at the site of perimortem wounds. Depending on the rate of decomposition and the development time of particular blowfly species, eggs may hatch and young larvae begin to feed on tissues and liquids while the carcass is still classified in the fresh stage.

Adult ants may also be seen at a carcass during the fresh stage. Ants will feed both on the carcass flesh as well as eggs and young larvae of first arriving flies.

=== Bloat stage ===
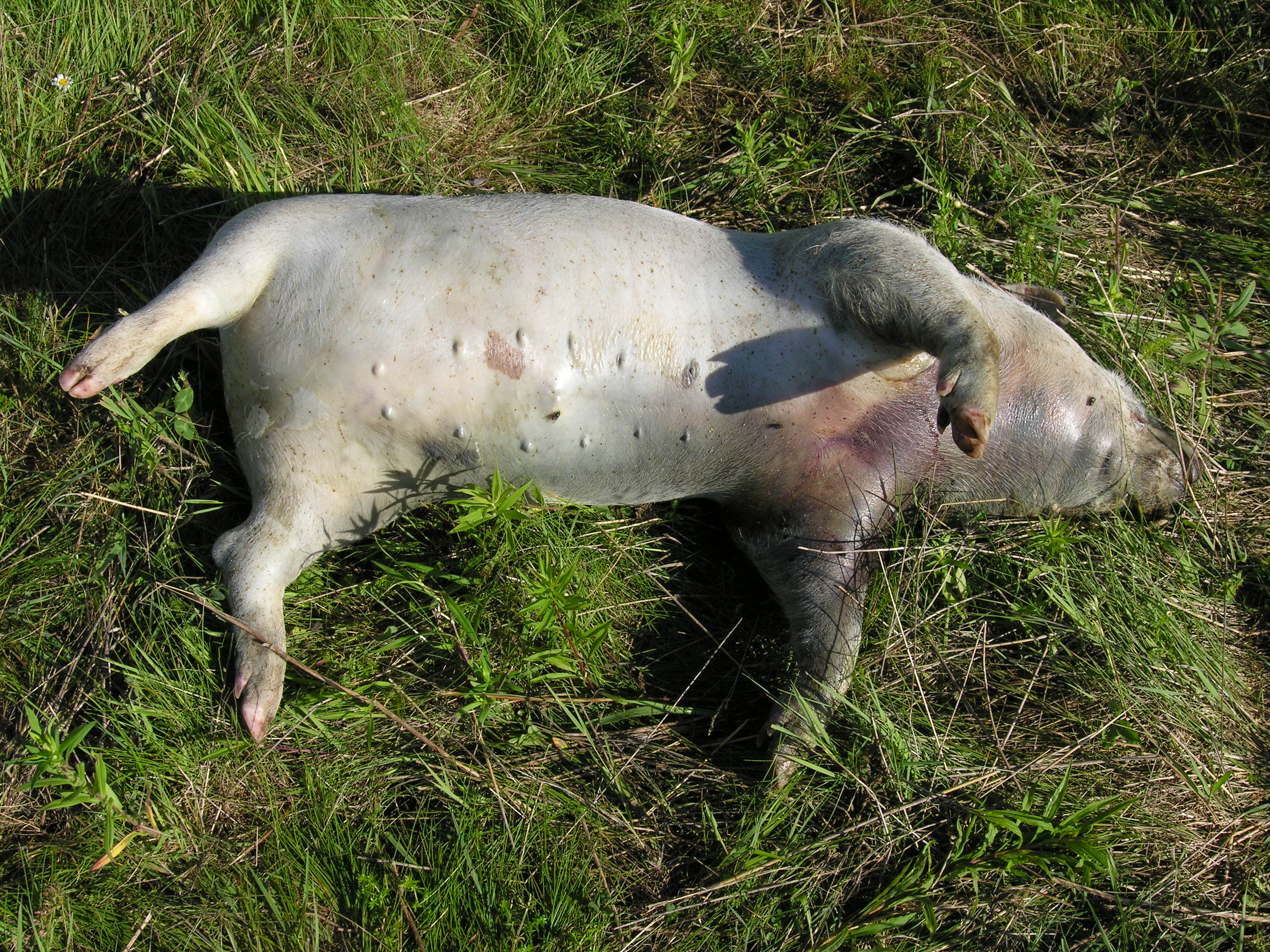
Pig carcass in the bloat stage of decomposition

The first visible sign of the Bloat Stage is a slight inflation of the abdomen and some blood bubbles at the nose. Activity of anaerobic bacteria in the abdomen create gases, which accumulate and results in abdominal bloating. A colour change is observed in the carcass flesh, along with the appearance of marbling. During the bloat stage the odor of putrefaction becomes noticeable.

Blowflies remain present in great numbers during the bloat stage, and blowflies, flesh flies and muscids continue to lay eggs. Insects of the families Piophilidae and Fanniidae arrive during the bloat stage. Ants continue to feed on the eggs and young larvae of flies.

The first species of Coleoptera arrive during the bloat stage of decomposition, including members of the families Staphylinidae (rove beetles), Silphidae (carrion beetles) and Cleridae. These beetles are observed feeding on fly eggs and larvae. Beetle species from the families Histeridae may also be collected during this stage, and are often hidden beneath remains.

=== Active decay stage ===
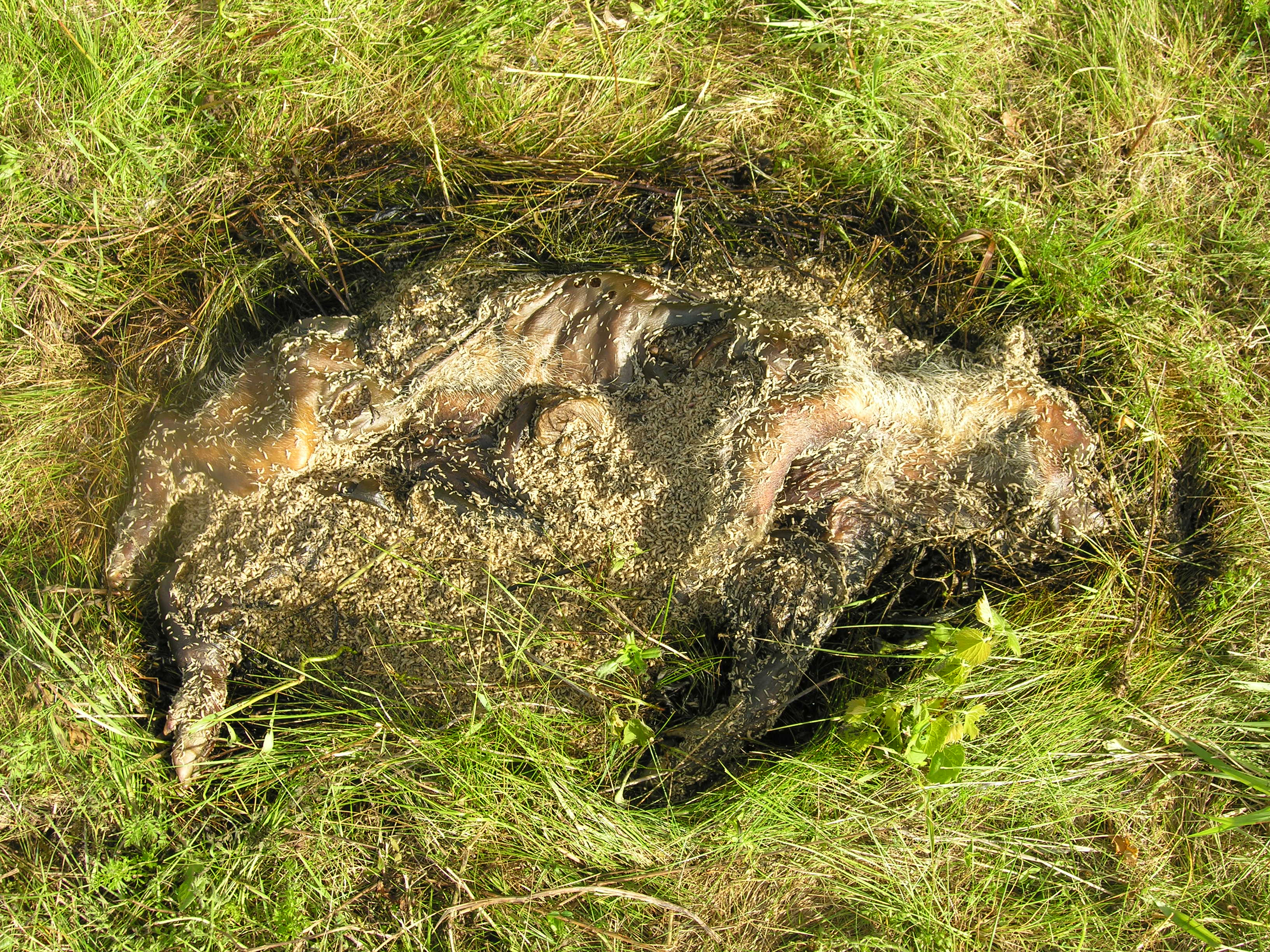
Pig carcass in the active decay stage of decomposition

The beginning of active decay stage is marked by the deflation of the carcass as feeding Dipteran larvae pierce the skin and internal gases are released. During this stage the carcass has a characteristic wet appearance due to the liquefaction of tissues. Flesh from the head and around the anus and umbilical cord is removed by larval feeding activity. A strong odor of putrefaction is associated with the carcass.

Feeding larvae of Calliphoridae flies are the dominant insect group at carcasses during the active decay stage. At the beginning of the stage larvae are concentrated in natural orifices, which offer the least resistance to feeding. Towards later stages, when flesh has been removed from the head and orifices, larvae become more concentrated in the thoracic and abdominal cavities.

Adult calliphorids and muscids decreased in numbers during this stage, and were not observed to be mating. However, non-Calliphoridae Dipterans are collected from carcasses. The first members of Sepsidae arrive at the carcass during the active decay stage. Members of Coleoptera become the dominant adult insects at the site of remains. In particular, the numbers of staphylinids and histerids increase.

=== Advanced decay stage ===
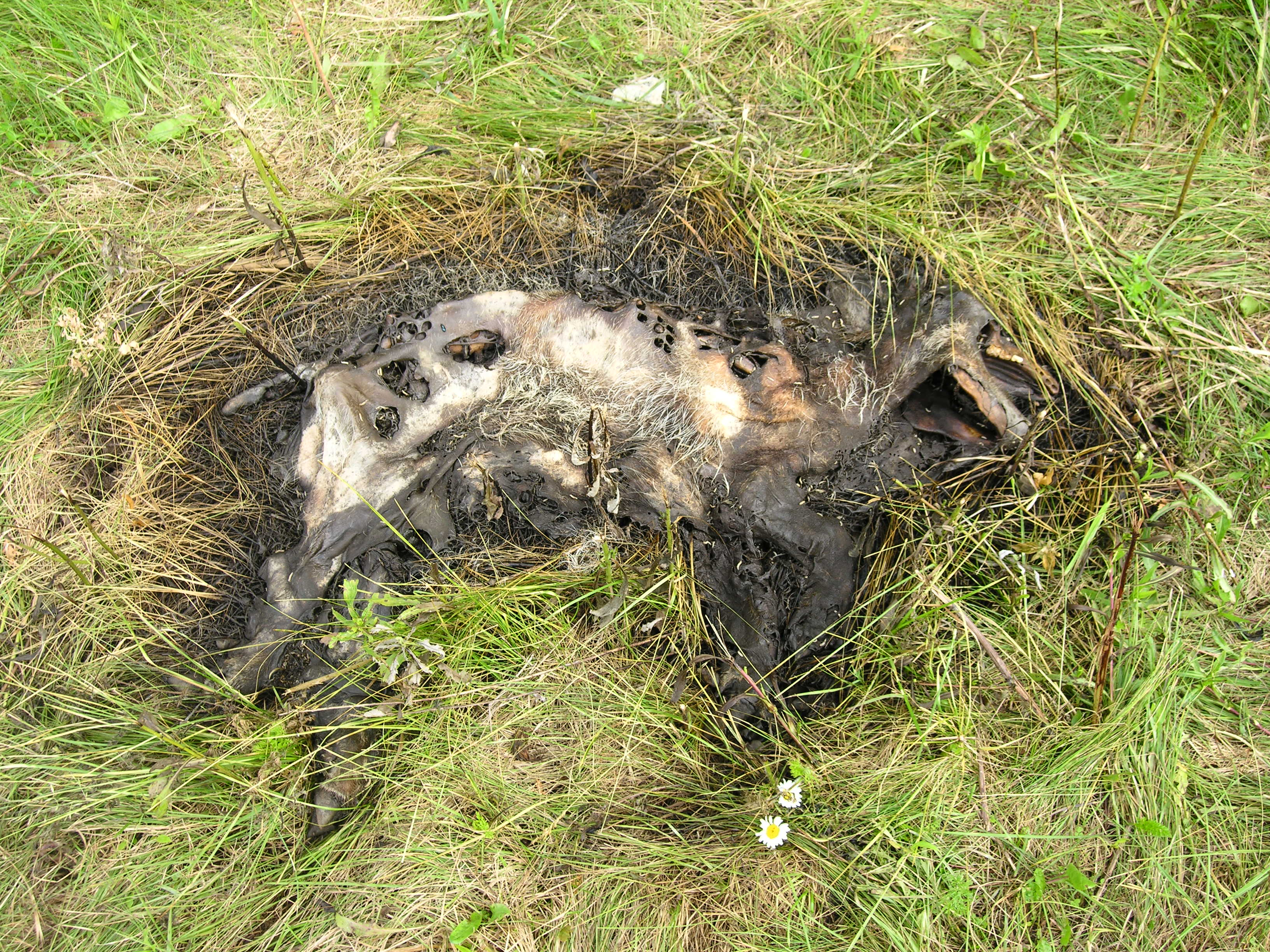
Pig carcass in the advanced decay stage of decomposition

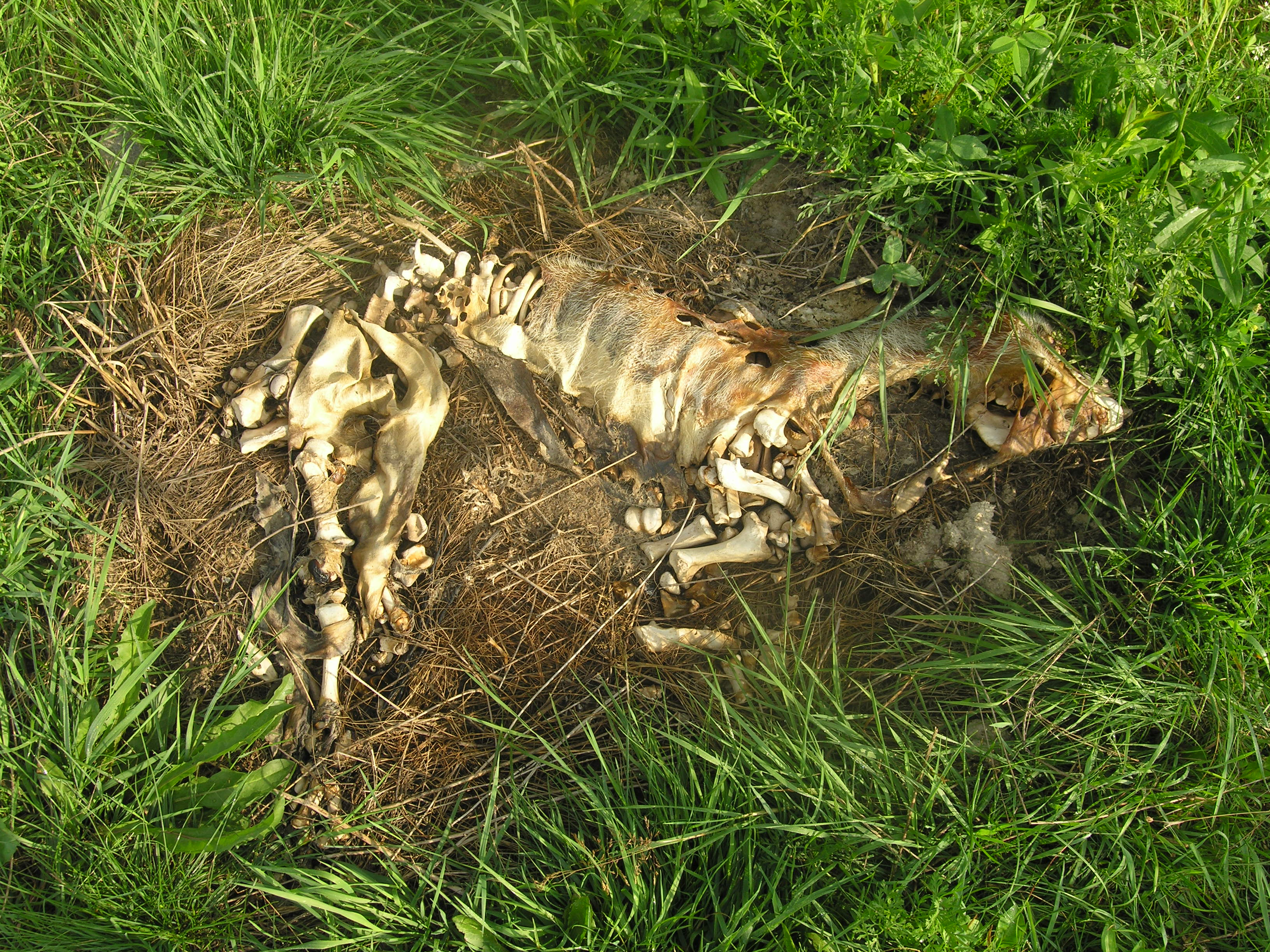
Pig carcass in the dry remains stage of decomposition

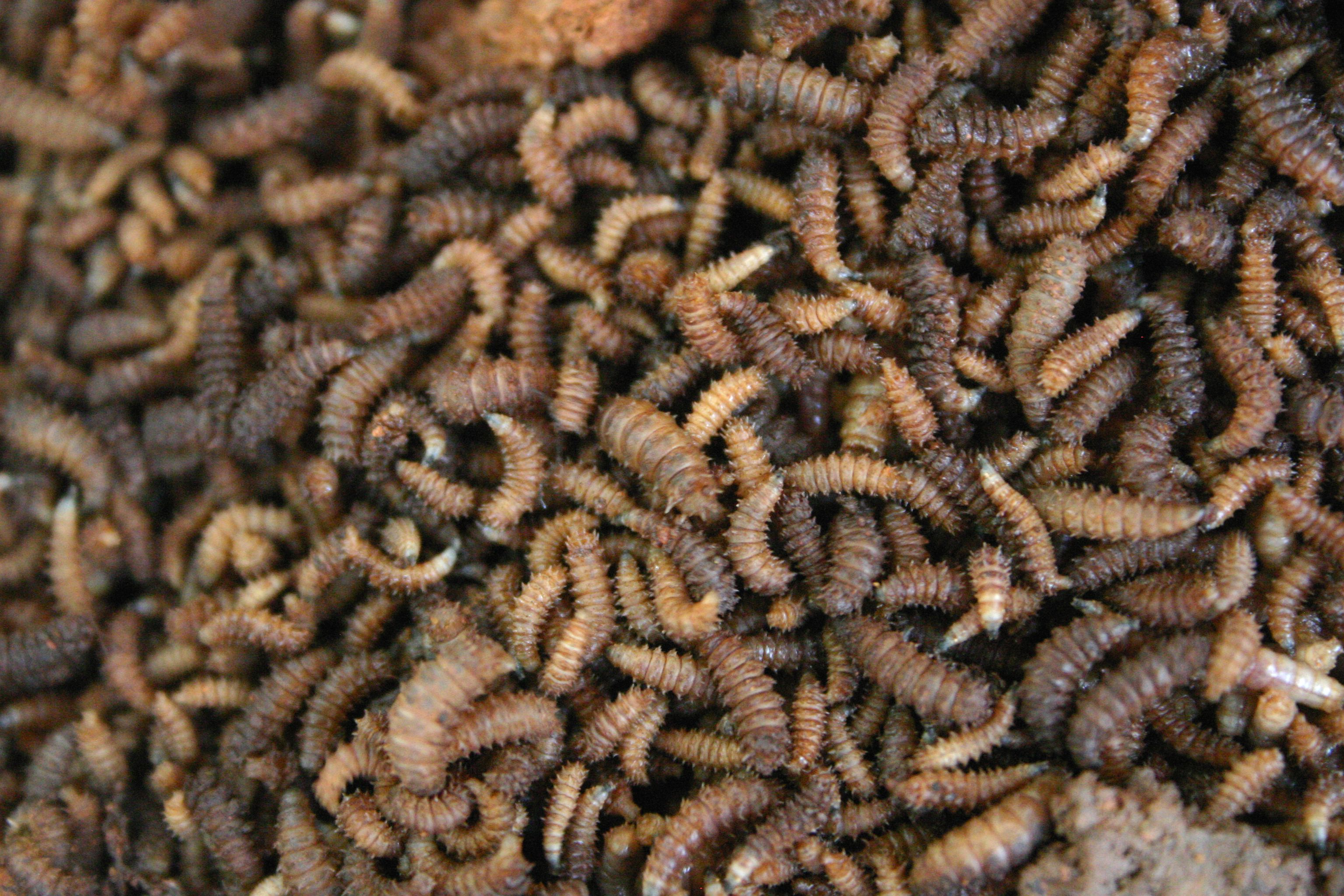
Blowfly and fly larvae on the 5-day-old corpse of a South African porcupine (Hystrix africaeaustralis)

Most of the flesh is removed from the carcass during the advanced decay stage, though some flesh may remain in the abdominal cavity. Strong odors of decomposition begin to fade.

This stage marks the first mass migration of third instar calliphorid larvae from the carcass Piophilidae larvae may also be collected at this stage. Few adult Calliphoridae are attracted to carcasses in advanced decay. Adult Dermestidae (skin beetles) arrive at the carcass; adult dermestid beetles may be common, whereas larval stages are not.

=== Dry decay ===
The final stage of decomposition is dry remains. Payne described a total of six stages of decay, the last two being separate dry and remains. As these stages are nearly impossible to distinguish between, many entomological studies combine the two into a single final stage. Very little remains of the carcass in this stage, mainly bones, cartilage and small bits of dried skin. There is little to no odor associated with remains. Any odor present may range from that of dried skin to wet fur.

The greatest number of species are reported to occur in the late decay and dry stages. The dry decay stage is characterized by the movement from previously dominant carrion fauna to new species. Very few adult calliphorids are attracted to the carcass at this stage, and adult piophilids emerge. The dermestid beetles, common in advanced decay, leave the carcass. Non-carrion organisms that commonly arrive at remains in dry decay are centipedes, millipedes, isopods, snails and cockroaches.

== Factors affecting decomposition ==
Understanding how a corpse decomposes and the factors that may alter the rate of decay is extremely important for evidence in death investigations. Campobasso, Vella, and Introna consider the factors that may inhibit or favor the colonization of insects to be vitally important when determining the time of insect colonization.

=== Temperature and climate ===
Low temperatures generally slow down the activity of blow-flies and their colonization of a body. Higher temperatures in the summer favor large maggot masses on the carrion. Dry and windy environments can dehydrate a corpse, leading to mummification. Dryness causes cessation in bacterial growth since there are no nutrients present to feed on.

=== Access ===
Access to the body can limit which insects can get to the body in order to feed and lay eggs. Those circumstances that enhance the availability of corpses for arthropod colonization are called "physical barriers". For example, corpses found in brightly lit areas are generally inhabited by Lucilia illustris, in contrast to Phormia regina, which prefers more shaded areas. Darkness, cold, and rain limit the amount of insects that would otherwise colonize the body. A submerged corpse can vary in temperature and is colonized by very few terrestrial insects. Fish, crustaceans, aquatic insects and bacteria would be the likely fauna in this case. Bodies that have been buried are harder to get to than freely available bodies which limits the availability of certain insects to colonize. The Coffin fly Megaselia scalaris is one of the few fly species seen on buried bodies because it has the ability to dig up to six feet underground to reach a body and oviposit.

=== Reduction and cause of death ===
Scavengers and carnivores such as wolves, dogs, cats, beetles, and other insects feeding on the remains of a carcass can make determining the time of insect colonization much harder. This is because the decomposition process has been interrupted by factors that may speed up decomposition. Corpses with open wounds, whether pre or post mortem, tend to decompose faster due to easier insect access. The cause of death likewise can leave openings in the body that allow insects and bacteria access to the inside body cavities in earlier stages of decay. Flies oviposit eggs inside natural openings and wounds that may become exaggerated when the eggs hatch and the larvae begin feeding.

=== Clothing and pesticides ===
Wraps, garments, and clothing have shown to affect the rate of decomposition because the corpse is covered by some type of barrier. Wraps, such as tight fighting tarps can advance the stages of decay during warm weather when the body is outside. However, loose fitting coverings that are open on the ends may aid colonization of certain insect species and keep the insects protected from the outside environment. This boost in colonization can lead to faster decomposition. Clothing also provides a protective barrier between the body and insects that can delay stages of decomposition. For instance, if a corpse is wearing a heavy jacket, this can slow down decomposition in that particular area and insects will colonize elsewhere. Bodies that are covered in pesticides or in an area surrounded in pesticides may be slow to have insect colonization. The absence of insects feeding on the body would slow down the rate of decomposition.

=== Percent body fat of corpse ===
More fat on the body allows for faster decomposition. This is due to the composition of fat, which is high in water content. Larger corpses with higher percent body fat also tend to retain heat much longer than corpses with less body fat. Higher temperatures favor the reproduction of bacteria inside high nutrient areas of the liver and other organs.

=== Drugs ===
On occasion, drugs that are present in the body at death can also affect how fast insects break down the corpse. Development of these insects can be sped up by cocaine and slowed down by drugs containing arsenic.

== Current research ==
New research in the related field entomotoxicology is currently studying the effects of drugs on the development of insects who have fed on the decomposing tissue of a drug user. The effects of drugs and toxins on insect development are proving to be an important factor when determining the insect colonization time. It has been shown that cocaine use can accelerate the development of maggots. In one case, Lucilia sericata larvae that fed in the nasal cavity of a cocaine abuser, grew over 8 mm longer than larvae of the same generation found elsewhere on the body. Other researchers in entomotoxicology are developing techniques to detect and measure drug levels in older fly pupae. This research is useful for determining cause of death for bodies that are found during later stages of decay. To this date, bromazepam, levomepromazine, malathion, phenobarbital, triazolam, oxazepam, alimemazine, clomipramine, morphine, mercury, and copper have been recovered from maggots.

== Conclusion ==
Understanding the stages of decomposition, the colonization of insects, and factors that may affect decomposition and colonization are key in determining forensically important information about the body. Different insects colonize the body throughout the stage of decomposition. In entomological studies these stages are commonly described as fresh, bloat, active decay, advanced decay and dry decay. Studies have shown that each stage is characterized by particular insect species, the succession of which depends on chemical and physical properties of remains, rate of decomposition and environmental factors. Insects associated with decomposing remains may be useful in determining post-mortem interval, manner of death, and the association of suspects. Insect species and their times of colonization will vary according to the geographic region, and therefore may help determine if remains have been moved.
