= King Clone =

Ancient clonal colony of creosote bush in the Mojave Desert

Coordinates: 34°25′14″N 116°42′17″W

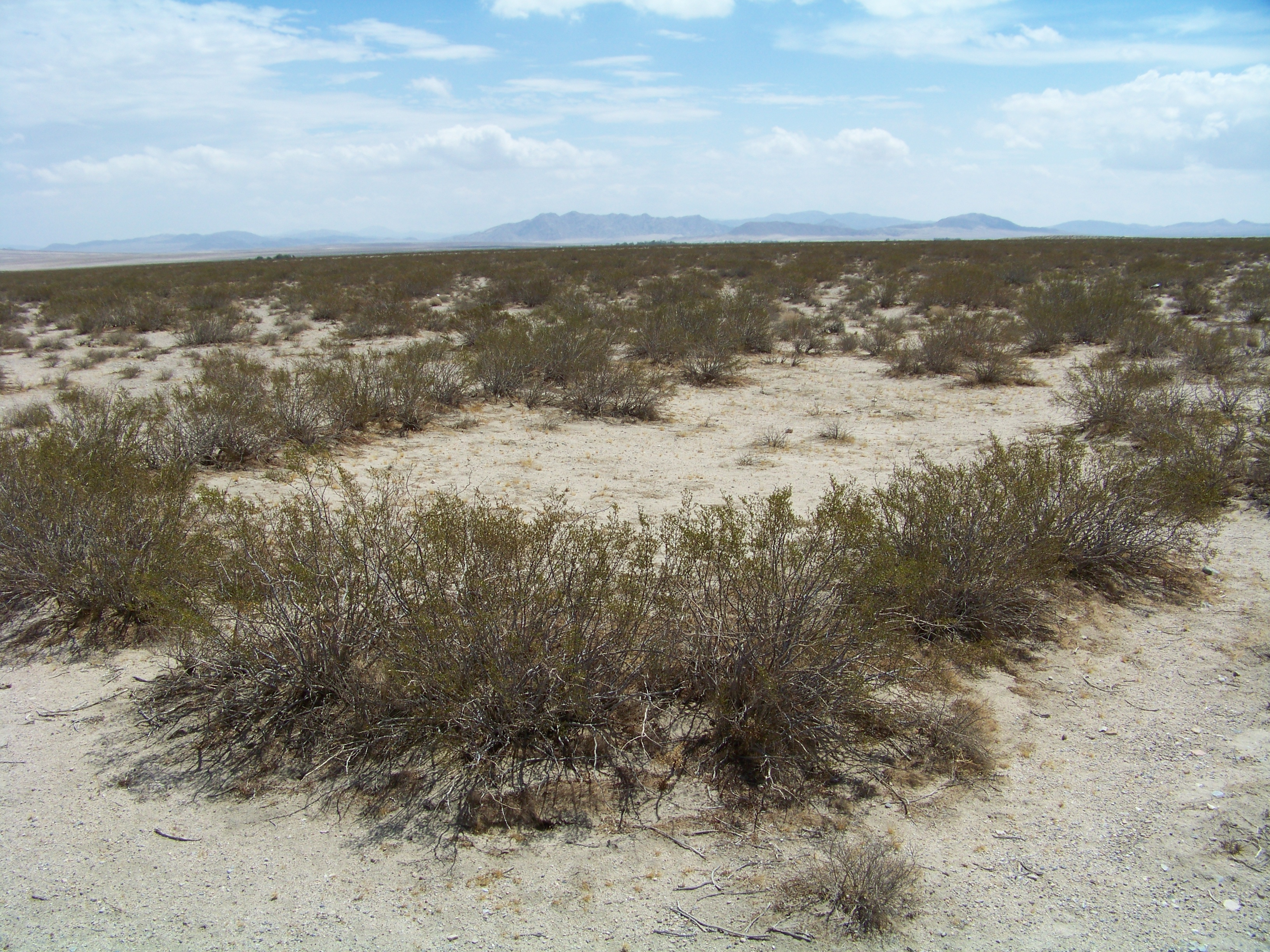
King Clone, the 11,700-year-old creosote bush ring in the Mojave Desert

King Clone is thought to be the oldest creosote bush ring in the Mojave Desert. The ring is estimated to be 11,700 years old, making it one of the oldest living organisms on Earth. This single clonal colony plant of Larrea tridentata reaches up to 67 feet (20 metres) in diameter, with an average diameter of 45 feet (14 m).

== Geography ==
The King Clone ring is on restricted-access land in the central Mojave Desert, near the towns of Lucerne Valley and Landers. It is in the Creosote Rings Preserve of the Lucerne Valley and Johnson Valley.

== Dating methodology ==
King Clone was identified and the age estimated by Frank Vasek, a professor at the University of California, Riverside. After Vasek hypothesized that the creosote ring was, in fact, one organism, Leonel da Silveira Lobo O'Reilly Sternberg (then a graduate student working in Vasek's lab), documented that plants within a ring had more similar characteristics than those from other plant clusters. Vasek then used two methods to estimate the age of the ring. One method counted rings and measured the distance of annual growth, and the other used radiocarbon dating on pieces of wood found in the center of the ring, and measuring their distances from each other and the living bushes. The two dating methods yielded similar results (age about 11,700 years).

== Media appearances ==
The plant was featured in an episode of Ripley's Believe It or Not! in 1983. This plant was in the episode "Desert Worlds" of the David Attenborough TV series The Green Planet where he revisited the plant in 2022, after previously filming it in 1982 for the episode "The Baking Deserts" of The Living Planet. The plant had grown by less than 1 inch (25 mm) during this time.

== See also ==
- List of oldest trees
- Fairy ring
