= Holly Palance =

American actress and journalist (born 1950)

- Palance in Ripley's Believe it or Not!, 1983
- Born: August 5, 1950 (age 76); Los Angeles, California, U.S.
- Occupation: Actress
- Years active: 1973–1989
- Spouses: Roger Spottiswoode (m. 1983; div. 1997) Robert Wallace (m. 2010)
- Children: 2
- Father: Jack Palance

Holly Palance (born August 5, 1950) is an American former actress and journalist. She is perhaps best known for her role as the nanny of Damien Thorn in Richard Donner's The Omen (1976). Palance also appeared in Pete Walker's horror film The Comeback (1978). Beginning in 1984, she also co-hosted the series Ripley's Believe it or Not! with her father, Jack Palance.

Palance also had a leading role opposite Robin Williams and Kurt Russell in the comedy The Best of Times (1986) before retiring from acting. She later shifted to a career in journalism, serving as the editor-in-chief of the Los Angeles Times's lifestyle magazine.

== Early life ==
Holly Kathleen Palance was born on August 5, 1950, in Los Angeles, California. She is the daughter of actor Jack Palance and his wife Virginia Baker. Holly was the first of three children born to the couple. She is of Ukrainian descent. Palance spent her early life in Los Angeles before relocating with her father to Europe in 1957, where she lived in several countries over the next seven years, including Switzerland, Italy, and Germany.

== Career ==
At age 19, Palance enrolled in a three-year acting program in London. Before appearing onscreen, Palance performed in theater in England beginning in 1971, appearing in productions at the Oxford Playhouse and in London's West End. She continued to work primarily in England for the remainder of the decade.

Palance played Lois Lane opposite Christopher Reeve in his screen test for the title role in Superman (1978). The tests included scenes from the balcony interview in Superman and the Niagara Falls hotel room scene from Superman II (1980), where Reeve played Clark Kent; this footage was released to the public as an extra feature on a special edition DVD release of the film in the early 2000s. Palance is notable for her role as an ill-destined young nanny in The Omen (1976), alongside Gregory Peck and Lee Remick. In 1979, after spending eight years working in England, Palance returned to her native United States.

In November 1979, Palance made her Broadway debut in the role of Allison St. James in Bernard Slade's Romantic Comedy, opposite Mia Farrow, Anthony Perkins, and Carole Cook. The production played at the Ethel Barrymore Theatre, the same theatre where both her parents served as understudies in the original Broadway production of A Streetcar Named Desire three decades earlier.

Palance co-hosted the television version of Ripley's Believe It or Not! with her father for two seasons in 1983 and 1984, replacing Jack's former co-host, Catherine Shirriff; Holly would later be replaced as co-host by singer Marie Osmond.

Palance had a leading role opposite Robin Williams and Kurt Russell in the comedy The Best of Times (1986), her final theatrical film. She appeared in the 1989 television film Cast the First Stone before formally retiring from acting.

After leaving acting, Palance began working as a journalist. She was an editor and columnist at Buzz Magazine for ten years. Her column "The Hills" was reprinted in the New York Times and nominated for a Maggie Award. She also worked as a freelance writer for the Los Angeles Times, Cosmopolitan, and other magazines. She then became editor-in-chief of Santa Barbara Magazine and, from 2004, editor-in-chief of the Los Angeles Times's Distinction magazine. She taught global studies at the University of California.

== Personal life ==
She married Tomorrow Never Dies director Roger Spottiswoode on April 9, 1983; they had two children and divorced in 1997. In 2010, Palance married journalist Robert Wallace.

== Filmography ==
=== Film ===
Year	Title	Role	Notes
1973	Golf Etiquette	A Golfer	
1976	The Omen	Nanny	
1977	The Strange Case of the End of Civilization as We Know It	Air Hostess	
1978	The Comeback	Gail Cooper	
1982	Tuxedo Warrior	Sally / Jane	
1983	Under Fire	Journalist	
1986	The Best of Times	Elly Dundee	
1989	Cast the First Stone	Ellen Armstrong	Television film

=== Television ===
Year	Title	Role	Notes
1975	Thriller	Susie Kay	Episode: "The Next Voice You See"
1976	Dickens of London	Miss Baldwin	Miniseries
1982	Bret Maverick	Jessica 'Dolly' D'Nard	Series regular
1983	The Thorn Birds	Miss Carmichael	Miniseries
1983–1985	Ripley's Believe it or Not!	Host	Mid Seasons 1 through 3
