= Putrefaction =

Fifth stage of death

Putrefaction is the fifth stage of death, following pallor mortis, livor mortis, algor mortis, and rigor mortis. This process references the breaking down of a body of an animal post-mortem. In broad terms, it can be viewed as the decomposition of proteins, and the eventual breakdown of the cohesiveness between tissues, and the liquefaction of most organs. This is caused by the decomposition of organic matter by bacterial or fungal digestion, which causes the release of gases that infiltrate the body's tissues, and leads to the deterioration of the tissues and organs. The approximate time it takes putrefaction to occur is dependent on various factors. Internal factors that affect the rate of putrefaction include the age at which death has occurred, the overall structure and condition of the body, the cause of death, and external injuries arising before or after death. External factors include environmental temperature, moisture and air exposure, clothing, burial factors, and light exposure. Body farms are facilities that study the way various factors affect the putrefaction process.

The first signs of putrefaction are signified by a greenish discoloration on the outside of the skin, on the abdominal wall corresponding to where the large intestine begins, as well as under the surface of the liver.

Certain substances, such as carbolic acid, arsenic, strychnine, and zinc chloride, can be used to delay the process of putrefaction in various ways based on their chemical make up.

== Description ==
In thermodynamic terms, all organic tissues are composed of chemical energy, which, when not maintained by the constant biochemical maintenance of the living organism, begin to chemically break down due to the reaction with water into amino acids, known as hydrolysis. The breakdown of the proteins of a decomposing body is a spontaneous process. Protein hydrolysis is accelerated as the anaerobic bacteria of the digestive tract consume, digest, and excrete the cellular proteins of the body.

The bacterial digestion of the cellular proteins weakens the tissues of the body. As the proteins are continuously broken down to smaller components, the bacteria excrete gases and organic compounds, such as the functional-group amines putrescine (from ornithine) and cadaverine (from lysine), which carry the noxious odor of rotten flesh. Initially, the gases of putrefaction are constrained within the body cavities, but eventually diffuse through the adjacent tissues, and then into the circulatory system. Once in the blood vessels, the putrid gases infiltrate and diffuse to other parts of the body and the limbs.

The visual result of gaseous tissue-infiltration is notable bloating of the torso and limbs. The increased internal pressure of the continually rising volume of gas further stresses, weakens, and separates the tissues constraining the gas. In the course of putrefaction, the skin tissues of the body eventually rupture and release the bacterial gas. As the anaerobic bacteria continue consuming, digesting, and excreting the tissue proteins, the body's decomposition progresses to the stage of skeletonization. This continued consumption also results in the production of ethanol by the bacteria, which can make it difficult to determine the blood alcohol content (BAC) in autopsies, particularly in bodies recovered from water.

Generally, the term decomposition encompasses the biochemical processes that occur from the physical death of the person (or animal) until the skeletonization of the body. Putrefaction is one of seven stages of decomposition; as such, the term putrescible identifies all organic matter (animal and human) that is biochemically subject to putrefaction. In the matter of death by poisoning, the putrefaction of the body is chemically delayed by poisons such as antimony, arsenic, carbolic acid (phenol), nux vomica (plant), strychnine (pesticide), and zinc chloride.

== Approximate timeline ==
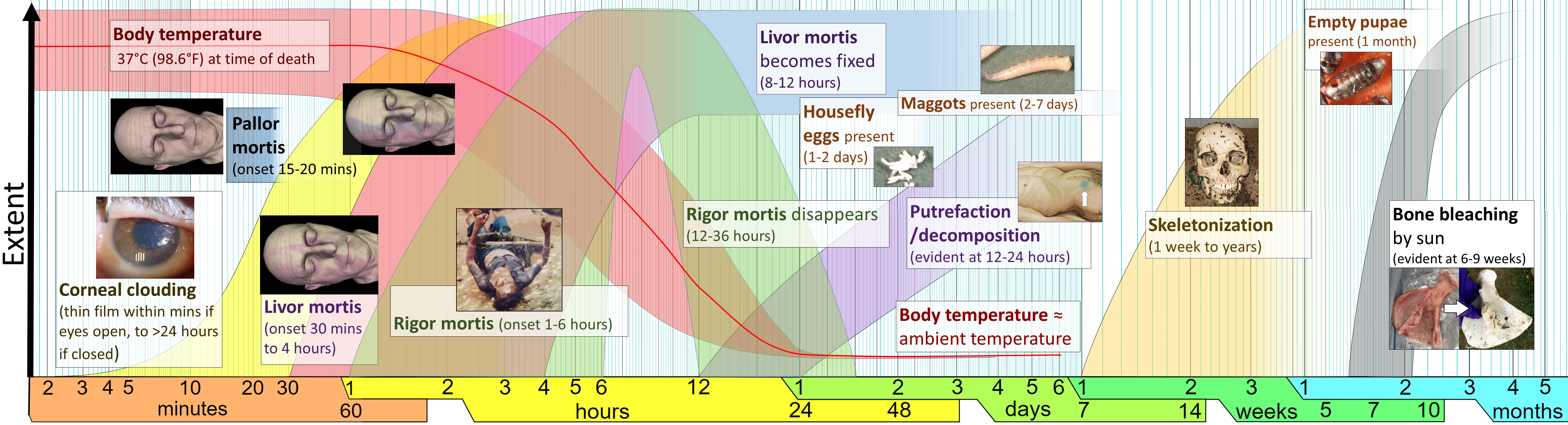
Timeline of postmortem changes (stages of death), with putrefaction labeled near middle.

The rough timeline of events during the putrefaction stage is as follows:

- 1–2 days: Pallor mortis, livor mortis, algor mortis, and rigor mortis are the first steps in the process of decomposition before the process of putrefaction.
- 2–3 days: Discoloration appears on the skin of the abdomen. The abdomen begins to swell due to gas formation.
- 3–4 days: The discoloration spreads and discolored veins become visible.
- 5–6 days: The abdomen swells noticeably and the skin blisters.
- 10–20 days: Black putrefaction occurs, which is when noxious odors are released from the body and the parts of the body undergo a black discoloration.
- 2 weeks: The abdomen is bloated; internal gas pressure nears maximum capacity.
- 3 weeks: Tissues have softened. Organs and cavities are bursting. The nails and hair fall off.
- 4 weeks: Soft tissues such as the internal organs begin to liquefy and the face becomes unrecognizable. The skin, muscles, tendons and ligaments degrade, exposing the body skeleton.

Order of organs' decomposition in the body:

1. Larynx and trachea
2. Infant brain
3. Stomach
4. Intestines
5. Spleen
6. Omentum and mesentery
7. Liver
8. Adult brain
9. Heart
10. Lungs
11. Kidneys
12. Bladder
13. Esophagus
14. Pancreas
15. Diaphragm
16. Blood vessels
17. Uterus

The rate of putrefaction is greatest in air, followed by water, soil, and earth. The exact rate of putrefaction is dependent upon many factors such as weather, exposure and location. Thus, refrigeration at a morgue or funeral home can retard the process, allowing for burial in three days or so following death without embalming. The rate increases dramatically in tropical climates. The first external sign of putrefaction in a body lying in air is usually a greenish discoloration of the skin over the region of the cecum, which appears in 12–24 hours. The first internal sign is usually a greenish discoloration on the undersurface of the liver.

== Factors affecting putrefaction ==
Various factors affect the rate of putrefaction.

=== Exogenous (external) ===
Environmental temperature: Decomposition is accelerated by high atmospheric or environmental temperature, with putrefaction speed optimized between 21 °C (70 °F) and 38 °C (100 °F), further sped along by high levels of humidity. This optimal temperature assists in the chemical breakdown of the tissue and promotes microorganism growth. Decomposition nearly stops below 0 °C (32 °F) or above 48 °C (118 °F).

Moisture and air exposure: Putrefaction is ordinarily slowed by the body being submerged in water, due to diminished exposure to air. Air exposure and moisture can both contribute to the introduction and growth of microorganisms, speeding degradation. In a hot and dry environment, the body can undergo a process called mummification where the body is completely dehydrated and bacterial decay is inhibited.

Clothing: Loose-fitting clothing can speed up the rate of putrefaction, as it helps to retain body heat. Tight-fitting clothing can delay the process by cutting off blood supply to tissues and eliminating nutrients for bacteria to feed on.

Manner of burial: Speedy burial can slow putrefaction. Bodies within deep graves tend to decompose more slowly due to the diminished influences of changes in temperature. The composition of graves can also be a significant contributing factor, with dense, clay-like soil tending to speed putrefaction while dry and sandy soil slows it.

Light exposure: Light can also contribute indirectly, as flies and insects prefer to lay eggs in areas of the body not exposed to light, such as the crevices formed by the eyelids and nostrils.

=== Endogenous (internal) ===
Age at time of death: Stillborn fetuses and infants putrefy slowly due to their sterility. Otherwise, however, younger people generally putrefy more quickly than older people.

Condition of the body: A body with a greater fat percentage and less lean body mass will have a faster rate of putrefaction, as fat retains more heat and it carries a larger amount of fluid in the tissues.

Cause of death: The cause of death has a direct relationship to putrefaction speed, with bodies that died from acute violence or accident generally putrefying slower than those that died from infectious diseases. Certain poisons, such as potassium cyanide or strychnine, may also delay putrefaction, while chronic alcoholism and cocaine use will speed it.

External injuries: Antemortem or postmortem injuries can speed putrefaction as injured areas can be more susceptible to invasion by bacteria.

=== Delayed putrefaction ===
Certain poisonous substances to the body can delay the process of putrefaction. They include:

- Carbolic acid (Phenol)
- Arsenic and antimony
- Strychnine
- Nux vomica (plant)
- Zinc chloride, ZnCl_{2}
- Morphine
- Aconitine

=== Embalming ===
Embalming is the process of preserving human remains by delaying decomposition. This is acquired through the use of embalming fluid, which is a mixture of formaldehyde, methanol, and various other solvents. The most common reasons to preserve the body are for viewing purposes at a funeral, for above-ground interment or distant transportation of the deceased, and for medical or religious practices.

== Research ==
Body farms subject donated cadavers to various environmental conditions to study the process of human decomposition. These include The University of Tennessee's Forensic Anthropologic Facility, Western Carolina Universities Osteology Research Station (FOREST), Texas State University's Forensic Anthropology Research Facility (FARF), Sam Houston State University's Southeast Texas Applied Forensic Science Facility (STAFS), Southern Illinois University's Complex for Forensic Anthropology Research, and Colorado Mesa University's Forensic Investigation Research Station. The Australian Facility for Taphonomic Experimental Research, near Sydney, is the first body farm located outside of the United States In the United Kingdom there are several facilities which, instead of using human remains or cadavers, use dead pigs to study the decomposition process. Pigs are less likely to have infectious diseases than human cadavers, and are more readily available without any concern for ethical issues, but a human body farm is still highly sought after for further research. Each body farm is unique in its environmental make-up, giving researchers a broader knowledge, and allowing research into how different environmental factors can affect the rate of decomposition significantly such as humidity, sun exposure, rain or snow, altitude level and more.

== Other uses ==
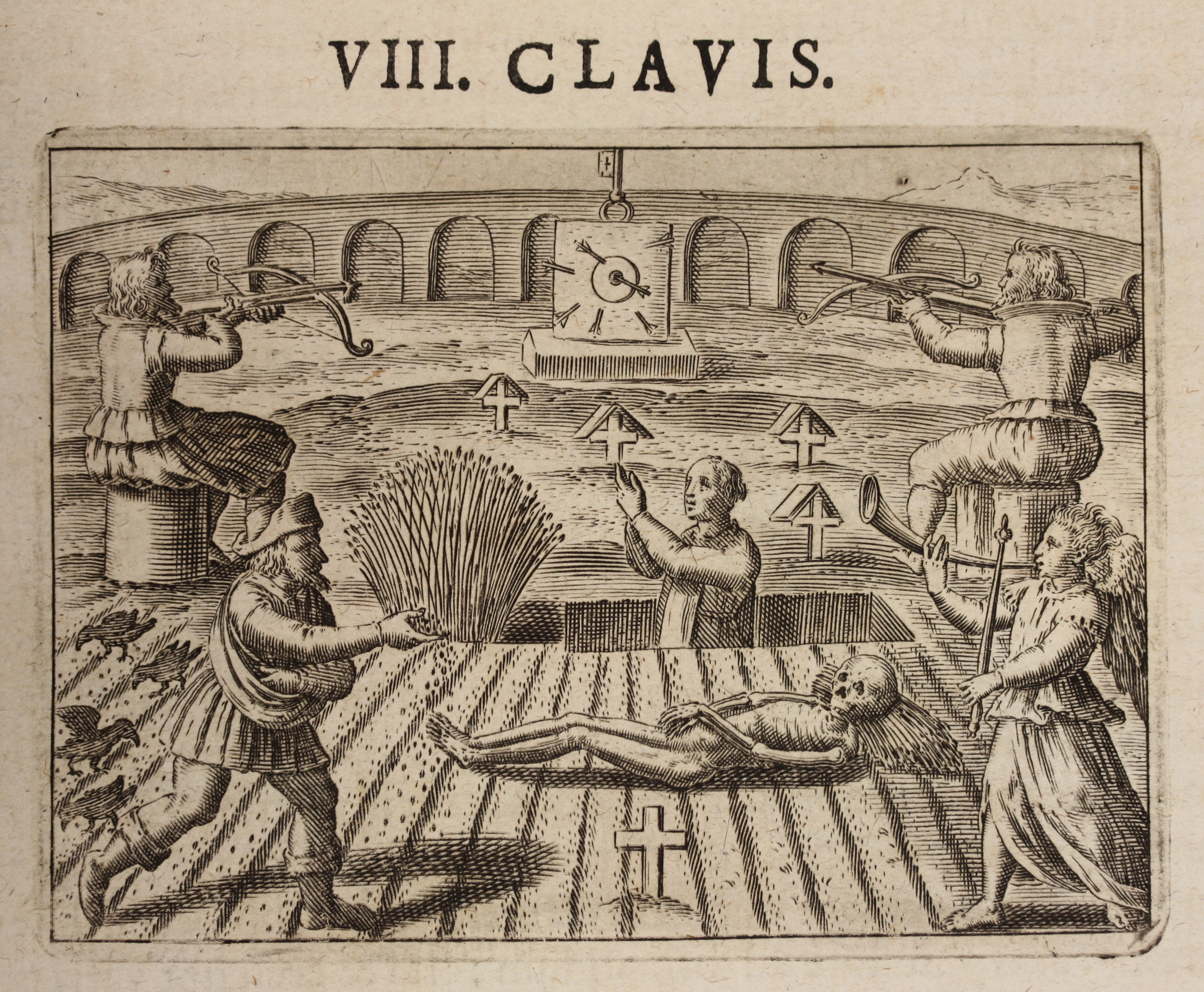
Putrefaction, the eighth alchemical key of Basil Valentine, 1678, Chemical Heritage Foundation

In alchemy, putrefaction is the same as fermentation, whereby a substance is allowed to rot or decompose undisturbed. In some cases, the commencement of the process is facilitated with a small sample of the desired material to act as a "seed", a technique akin to the use of a seed crystal in crystallization.

== See also ==
- Cryopreservation – Process to preserve biological matter
- Corpse decomposition – Process in which bodies break down
- Decomposition – Process of breaking down organic matter
- Embalming – Method of preserving human remains
- Forensic entomological decomposition – Aspect of forensic science
- Maceration (bone) – Technique to obtain a clean skeleton
- Promession – Method of corpse disposal
- Putrefying bacteria – Bacteria involved in decay of living matter
- Rancidification – Autoxidation or hydrolysis of fats and oils
- Cotard's syndrome – Delusion that one is dead or non-existent
