= Putrefying bacteria =

Bacteria involved in decay of living matter

Putrefying/decay bacteria are bacteria involved in putrefaction of living matter. Along with other decomposers, they play a critical role in recycling nitrogen from dead organisms. Putrefying bacteria also play a role in putrefaction and fermentation of proteins in the human gastrointestinal tract.

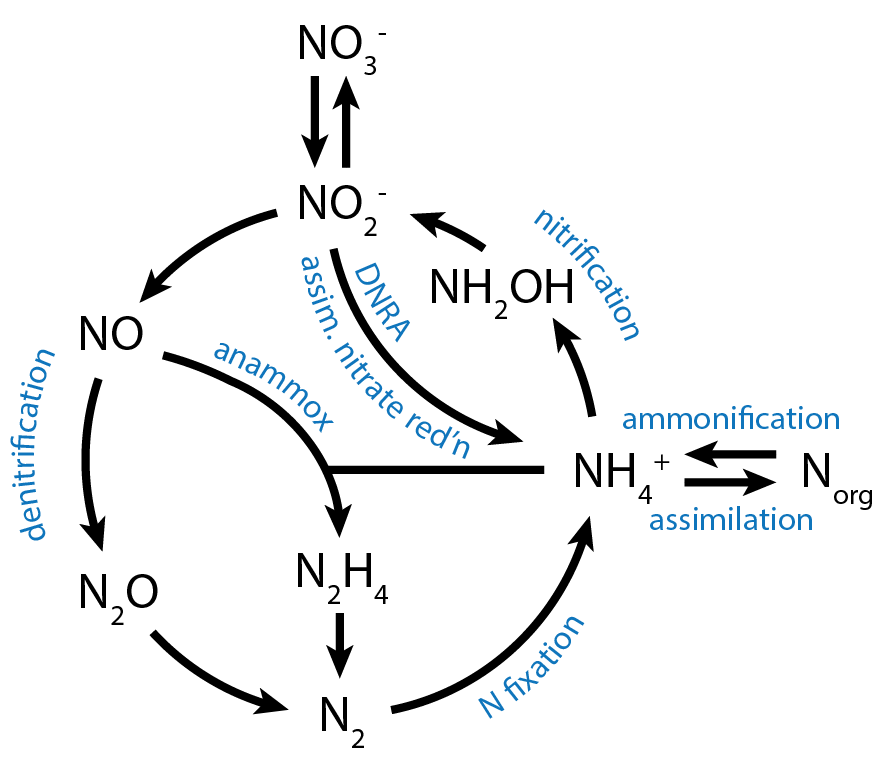
Putrefying bacteria play a key role in the nitrogen cycle.

Putrefying bacteria is a broad term used to define several species of bacteria involved in decomposition and fermentation. Putrefying bacteria play a key role in decomposing and fermenting substances within the body as well as the body itself after death. Putrefaction is defined as the final step of decomposition after death. Because these bacteria play a role in decomposition after death, putrefying bacteria also play a key role in the nitrogen cycle. They deconstruct and convert substances from dead organisms so nitrifying bacteria can then convert these products into a usable form of nitrogen.

== Putrefying bacteria in the nitrogen cycle ==
The nitrogen cycle is a vital part of life, and is essential to carry out biosynthesis of nitrogen containing compounds. Nitrogen is inaccessible to most organisms unless it is fixed, and this process can only be carried out by certain classes of prokaryotes. Putrefying bacteria use amino acids or urea as an energy source to decompose dead organisms. In the process, they produce ammonium ions. Nitrifying bacteria then convert this ammonium into nitrate by oxidation, which can then be used by plants to create more proteins thus completing the nitrogen cycle. This process is called nitrification. Energy from this oxidation reaction can also be used to synthesize organic compounds in a process called chemosynthesis.

== Putrefaction ==
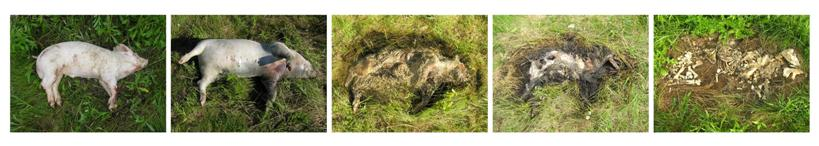
Putrefaction begins soon after death.

Putrefaction, i.e. fermentation of proteins, is considered the final step following death, and is carried out mainly by anaerobic organisms from the bowel. Putrefying bacteria produce a plethora of enzymes which aid in disintegration of the body. Because of the lack of immune function within the body, these bacteria spread through blood vessels and utilize the carbohydrates and proteins in the blood as an energy source. The main bacterial species carrying out putrefaction is Cl. welchii. This bacterium contributes to gas formation, breakdown of remaining blood clots, disintegration of tissue, and marked hemolysis.

This breakdown begins immediately after death, but is not noticeable to the naked eye until several hours after death. Within the following days, the body will begin to break down. The three characteristics of putrefaction are discoloration, disfiguration, and dissolution. There are many factors that could affect the rate of putrefaction in animals such as age, body composition, temperature, and if the body is located in a wet or dry area. Temperature must be between 0 °C and 48 °C for putrefaction to occur. The established bacterial community also play a role in rate of putrefaction. Newborn children that have not been fed will decompose slower than a toddler's body because of the lack of an established gut microbiota. Older individuals tend to decompose slower than younger individuals. Individuals with inflammatory disease, eating disorders, sepsis, and other conditions that affect gut microbiota will all decompose at different rates.

== Putrefying bacteria in gut ==
The gut microbiome plays a huge role in human health, and having a healthy bacterial community is essential to living a healthy life—bacteria aid in digesting nutrients that a human's gastrointestinal tract cannot process independently. Putrefying bacteria in the gut play a key role in fermenting or decomposing proteins that are not broken down by the body. The process of fermentation and putrefaction mainly occurs in the distal colon. These bacteria contribute to the number of metabolites in the large intestine. The gut microbial community is extremely diverse, and putrefying bacteria include diverse bacterial species. Some of these bacteria include Bacillus, Clostridium, Enterobacter, Escherichia, Fusobacterium, Salmonella, etc. These bacterial communities are established by diet, and the microbial modes of transmission. Today's research has not yet fully explored the implications of putrefying bacteria in the human gut microbiome, however current data suggests these bacteria could be helpful or harmful to our systems depending on the circumstances. Some products of putrefying pathways, such as Indole, have been shown to help protect against intestinal worms. Some putrefying bacteria such as Fusobacteriota (formerly Fusobacteria) contribute to harmful cancer and disease, such as colorectal carcinoma.

== See also ==
- Decomposition – Process of breaking down organic matter
- Anaerobic organism – Organism not requiring oxygen for its growth
- Nitrogen cycle – Biogeochemical cycle by which nitrogen is converted into various chemical forms
- Microbiome – Microbial community assemblage and activity
- Putrefaction – Fifth stage of death
