= Maceration (bone) =

Technique to obtain a clean skeleton

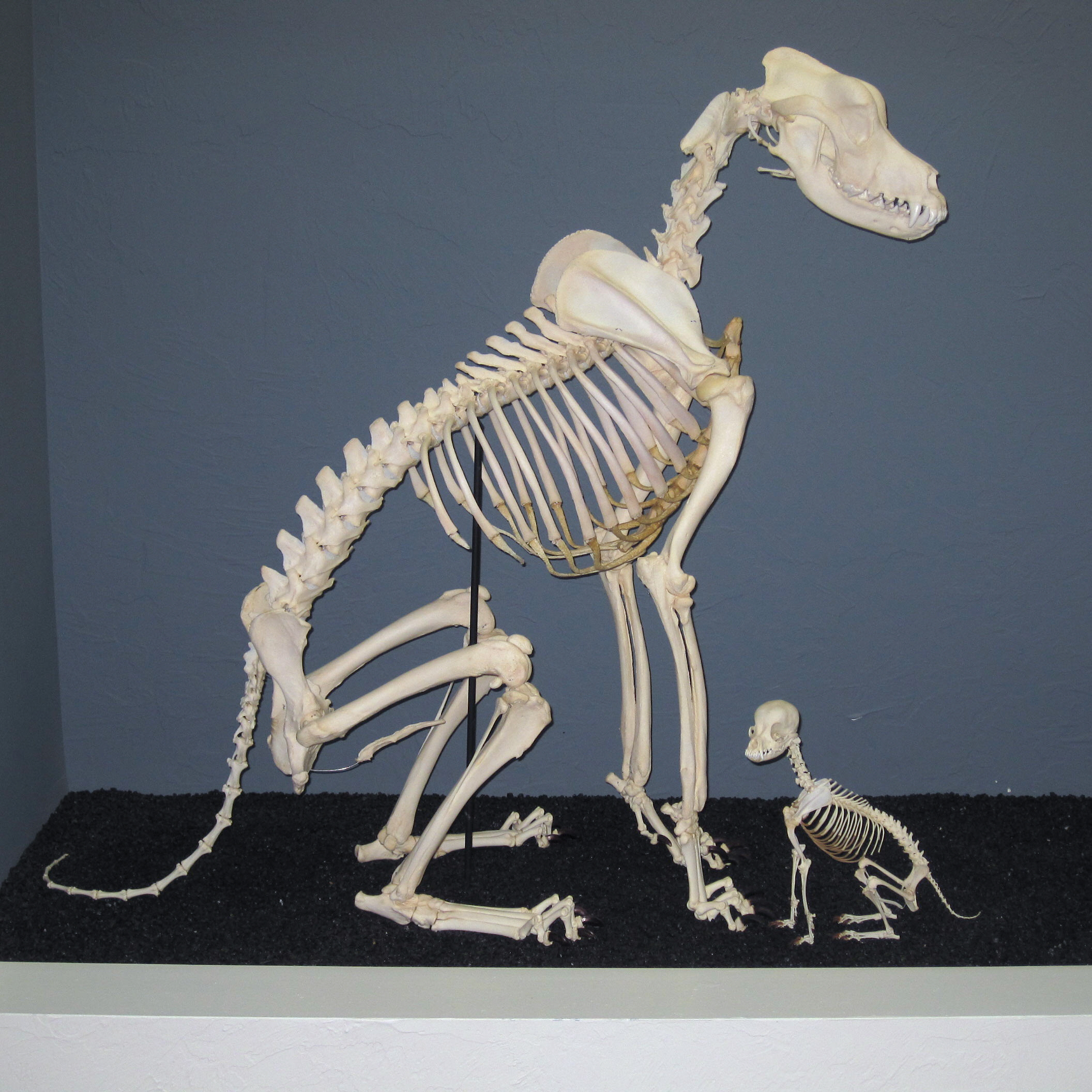
Macerated skeletons of a Great Dane and a Chihuahua, on display at The Museum of Osteology, in Oklahoma City.

Maceration is a bone preparation technique whereby a clean skeleton is obtained from a vertebrate carcass by leaving it to decompose inside a closed container at near-constant temperature. This may be done as part of a forensic investigation, as a recovered body is too badly decomposed for a meaningful autopsy, but with enough flesh or skin remaining as to obscure macroscopically visible evidence, such as cut-marks. In most cases, maceration is done on the carcass of an animal for educational purposes.

== Description ==
Maceration is a form of controlled putrefaction, a stage of decomposition in which the proteins of the body's cells are broken down and consumed by bacteria in anaerobic conditions. The temperature is usually maintained at a constant optimal temperature in an incubator. Maceration generates very strong and distasteful odors, and is therefore usually done in a closed container in a ventilated area.

Maceration is an alternative to the Dermestes method in which skin beetles are used to clean the flesh off of the corpse, a method which is used with corpses of small mammals, birds, reptiles, and amphibians, because these animals' bones tend to fall apart in many tiny parts. Maceration is an unsuitable method to clean the bones of a fish, as they have a poorly articulated, pliable skeleton.

== Process ==
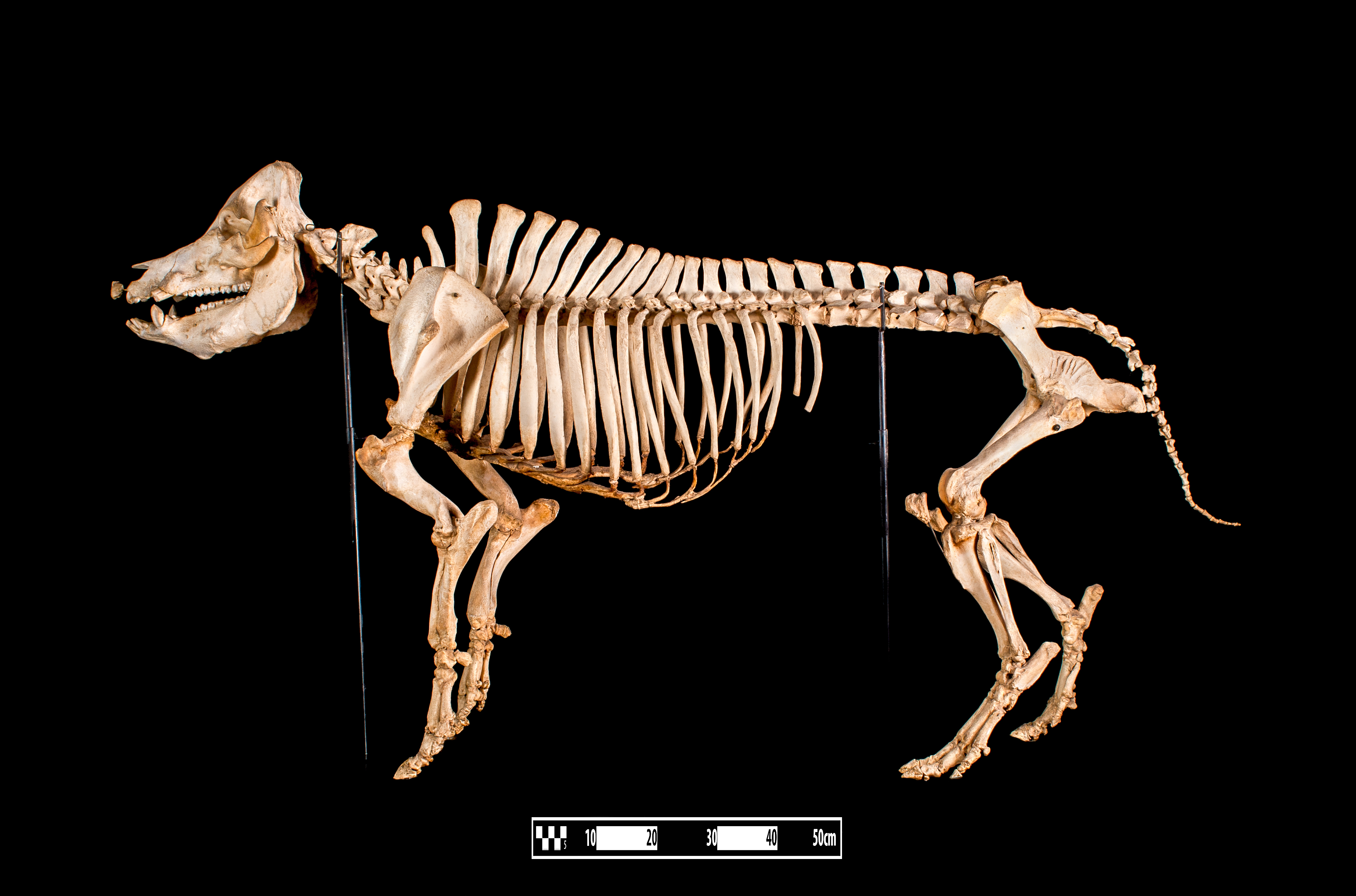
Skeleton of swine prepared by bone maceration

In the process of maceration, the carcass is first skinned and defleshed by hand as much as is practical, and all internal organs are removed. In this process, extra care is taken when removing the eyeballs, ears and jugular muscles, because some bones are shallow and brittle, such as the thickened external acoustic opening of many mammals. The tongue is usually left in place, because of its attachment to the hyoid bone. Severed parts of the carcass are sometimes kept in nylon pantyhose. Water is then put in a container and maintained a constant temperature, usually 35 °C though not warmer than 50 °C. Washing powder with enzymes (like Biotex) may be added, as it will soften the tissue. A mild detergent or emulsifier is sometimes used to remove fatty acids from the bone. When the carcass is put in the container, putrefying bacteria begin (or continue) to consume the soft tissue cells of the carcass, and will continue to do so as long as the temperature remains constant. After a few days, the water is replenished to maintain the bacteria, and some additional flesh may be cut away. Most medium-sized animals (like dogs) are macerated within about ten days.

Lipids and fatty acids in the bone and in the fat tissues tend to stain the bone brown. Oxidising bleaches may be used to whiten the bone, but if too much is used the perchlorate or hypochlorite damages the bone tissue, leaving it chalky and brittle. Hydrogen peroxide at quite low concentrations, say 1% to 3% replenished every few days, is less inclined to damage the tissue, though it may take a week or two to achieve complete whiteness.

== Completion ==
When the process of maceration is complete, the bones are removed from the solution and left to dry. If the skeleton is human and the subject of an investigation, the forensic anthropologist will then conduct an inventory and analysis of the remains. If the individual is to be identified, occupational and age-related osteological markers will be noted, and measurements of the bones will provide evidence suggesting the individual's height and race. If the skull is intact, forensic facial reconstruction is another option that may help in identifying the individual. If a crime has been established, an examination of the bones without overlying soft tissue may provide evidence on what weapon (if any) was used or on the nature of the injuries sustained.

In most cases, an animal is macerated for educational purposes. Once dry, the bones are collected, inventoried, and sometimes labelled or separated into labelled bags, all of which may then be placed in a container for storage. Alternately, steel wire is used to arrange the bones to appear as an articulated skeleton, and posed as the animal might have stood in life.

== See also ==
- Bioarchaeology
- Forensic anthropology
- Osteology
- Zoology
