= Hananuma Masakichi =

Japanese sculptor

- 花沼 政吉
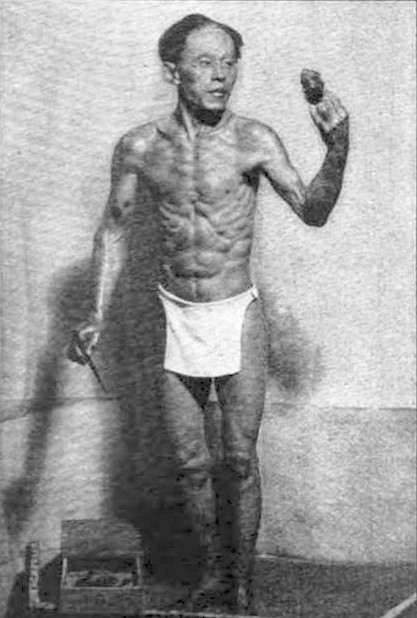
- Hananuma Masakichi's sculpture of himself
- Born: 1832
- Died: 1895 (aged 62–63)
- Known for: Sculptor

Hananuma Masakichi (花沼 政吉; 1832-1895) was a Japanese sculptor an doll maker who specialized in "iki-ningyo" or lifelike dolls. He was trained in the art under Gohei Nezumiya in Tokyo, during the 1870s. A number of his works have survived in American and British collections, notably those of Ripley's Believe It or Not! and the Sheffield Museum (the home town of the father of the Deakin Brothers of Yokohama, dealers in oriental art and curios in the 1890s).

Following his training under the fourteenth Gohei Nezumiya in Tokyo, Hananuma began working in collaboration with a Asakusa doll store and an art dealer based in Yokohama. His work began to become popular with foreigners after he produced a demon figure in 1878 for a Russian customer.

Hananuma sold a number of his works to the Deakin Brothers. This included a near life size sumo wrestler statue, themed around the Soga Monogatari. Harry Deakin later donated this sculpture to the Sheffield Museums Trust.

== Self portrait ==
One example of his work is self portrait, where he is portrayed naked, with details including hairs inserted in his gofun skin, holding a small mask in his hand (i.e. a mask sculptor), about life-size. This was exhibited in San Francisco in September 1894, and was depicted on a souvenir token from the Art Saloon, its owner at the time. It was reputed to be a self-portrait of the artist. Elaborations of the legend about this very lifelike image continued up through the time of the image's purchase by Ripley's in 1934, Robert Ripley would often put the statue in guest rooms at night in order to scare them. His house on B.I.O.N (Believe It or Not) Island had a slew of other strange collectibles including this. through its exhibit at the Chicago World's Fair in 1934, and into the present.

Ripley displayed the figure with the following story. Believing that he was dying from tuberculosis, Hananuma sculpted a life size statue of himself as a gift to the woman he loved, which was completed in 1885. The artist himself died 10 years later, in poverty aged 63.

Made of between 2000 and 5000 wooden strips (reports differ), it is connected only by dovetail joints, glue and wooden pegs. No joint is visible on the statue, and it is lacquered. Anatomically correct glass eyeballs were used and individual holes were drilled in the statue to represent the pores of the skin, and the corresponding hair inserted. The skin was made out of Gofun, a mixture of crushed oyster shells mixed with animal glue.

The theory that the sculpture is a self portrait has been disputed by some experts as there was no tradition of creating self portraits in Japan during this time.

The statue was later purchased by Robert Ripley in 1934, and was housed in his California Odditorium until his death in 1949. It was one of two self portrait sculptures by Hananuma that Ripley kept in his collection. After Ripley's death, the sculpture toured various Odditoriums until it was stored in the Los Angeles Odditorium where it was damaged in the 1994 Northridge earthquake. The statue was displayed on a rotating platform at the time and the earthquake had caused the platform to spin off the rotator. The sculpture took four months to repair but some signs of damage as still visible in the sculptures hair.

The statue is currently on display in the Amsterdam Odditorium, located on Dam Square and a replica is in the London Odditorium, located at 1 Piccadilly Circus.

== See also ==
- Ripley's Believe It or Not!
- Fine art
- Sculpture
