= Diutina catenulata =

Scientific classification
- Kingdom: Fungi
- Division: Ascomycota
- Class: Saccharomycetes
- Order: Saccharomycetales
- Family: Debaryomycetaceae
- Genus: Diutina
- Species: D. catenulata

Binomial name
- Diutina catenulata (Diddens & Lodder) Khunnamwong, Lertwattanasakul, Jindam., Limtong & Lachance, 2015

Species of fungus

Diutina catenulata is a yeast-form fungus in the phylum Ascomycota. It is distributed globally and commonly found on the skin of humans and animals, in soil, and in dairy products.

== Taxonomy ==
D. catenulata is a species originally assigned to the genus Candida. To be a species in the genus Candida implies a close relatedness to the type species Candida tropicalis, but it was found through tRNA, rRNA, and other phylogenetic analysis that C. catenulata is not closely related to C. tropicalis. As such, C. catenulata has been reclassified into a new genus, Diutina, as Diutina catenulata. This change also affected the family classification as Diutina is in the family Debaryomycetaceae/Metschnikowiaceae while the original genus Candida belongs to the family Saccaromycetaceae. Its membership to phylum Ascomycota, class Saccharomycetes, and order Saccharomycetales have remained unchanged.

== Morphology ==
D. catenulata is capable of living both as a yeast or as a pseudomycelium composed of pseudohyphae and capsule-shaped cells with dimensions of 1-2 micrometers by 5-7 micrometers.

== Ecology ==
Diutina catenulata is a skin and gut microbiome component of humans and animals, soil microbiome fungi, dairy product contaminant, and occasional opportunistic fungal pathogen. In the soil D. catenulata is most strongly associated with the necrobiome soil community. In soils surrounding cadavers, D. catenulata populations have been observed in experiments to grow to compose a significant portion of these soil communities over time. In cases of D. catenulata operating as an opportunistic pathogen it is most common that infections manifest as some type of superficial skin infection. In a rare case a 42-year-old woman in Strasbourg, France was found to be invasively infected by Diutina catenulata after blood cultures were prepared upon her re-admittance to a hospital post cancer treatment. This is the only recorded case of invasive infection by D. catenulata.

== Bioremediation ==
In a lab setting when supplied with food waste and composting, diesel fuel-inoculated colonies of D. catenulata were observed to degrade approximately 80% of petroleum hydrocarbons present in their environment. In un-inoculated colonies 48% hydrocarbon degradation was observed. Both of these results indicate D. catenulata is a promising species for use in bioremediation efforts of oil contaminated environments.
