= Saponifiable lipid =

A saponifiable lipid is part of the ester functional group. They are made up of long chain carboxylic (of fatty) acids connected to an alcoholic functional group through the ester linkage which can undergo a saponification reaction. The fatty acids are released upon base-catalyzed ester hydrolysis to form ionized salts. The primary saponifiable lipids are free fatty acids, neutral glycerolipids, glycerophospholipids, sphingolipids, and glycolipids.

By comparison, the non-saponifiable class of lipids is made up of terpenes, including fat-soluble A and E vitamins, and certain steroids, such as cholesterol.

== Applications ==
Saponifiable lipids have relevant applications as a source of biofuel and can be extracted from various forms of biomass to produce biodiesel.

== See also ==
- Lipids
- Simple lipid
