= Arpad Vass =

American forensic anthropologist (born 1959)

- Born: Arpad Alexander Vass; August 30, 1959 (age 67); Flemington, New Jersey
- Education: BS: Virginia Tech; MS: Virginia Commonwealth University; PhD: University of Tennessee
- Spouse: Victoria Ann Longo
- Scientific career
- Fields: Forensic anthropology
- Doctoral advisor: William M. Bass

Arpad Alexander Vass (born August 30, 1959) is a forensic anthropologist. He formerly taught at the Law Enforcement Innovation Center, which is part of the University of Tennessee's Institute for Public Service.

== Personal life ==
Vass is the son of a Hungarian immigrant. He grew up in Arlington, Virginia, where he graduated from Yorktown High School in 1977. He is married to Victoria Ann Longo.

He formerly taught at the Law Enforcement Innovation Center, which is part of the University of Tennessee's Institute for Public Service. For 23 years, he worked as a research scientist within the Life Sciences Division of the Oak Ridge National Laboratory until September 2012. Subsequently, he has been a part-time instructor at the National Forensic Academy in Oak Ridge, Tennessee, and has offered various services in missing person cases.

== Education and research ==
In 1980, Vass obtained the Antarctic Exploration certification from Scripps Institution of Oceanography. The following year, he earned a Bachelor of Science degree in biology from Virginia Tech. In 1984, Vass earned a Medical Technology degree from Fairfax Hospital. He earned a Masters of Science degree in Forensic Science from Virginia Commonwealth University in 1989, and he obtained his PhD from the University of Tennessee in anthropology.

In his work at the University of Tennessee Anthropological Research Facility (ARF), Arpad Vass researched the processes involved in the decomposition of human remains. He isolated specific tissues of the human body and the species of bacteria that affect their decomposition. He was particularly interested in using the chemicals released by a cadaver to determine the time since death and how the detection of those chemicals could assist in locating remains.

Vass's research centered on a forensic science technique called decomposition odor analysis, or DOA, which he claims would help to identify the body vapors which emanate from a decomposing human body. A database of such vapors would in theory enable the Federal Bureau of Investigation's search teams and cadaver dogs (Human Remains Detection dogs) to detect the location of remains of human beings. The database is a part of the University of Tennessee Anthropological Research Facility.

Vass has claimed to have developed a variety of forensic tools used to help detect and uncover forensic cases. He has also claimed, despite scientific consensus to the contrary, that dowsing rods can be used to find corpses. Eric Bartelink, former president of the American Board of Forensic Anthropology, has called Vass's services "not scientifically valid".

== Selected publications ==
- Vass, Arpad A (November 2001). "Beyond the grave – understanding human decomposition" (PDF). Microbiology Today. 28. Spencers Wood: Society for General Microbiology: 190–192. ISSN 1464-0570.
- Vass, Arpad A; et al. (September 1992). "Time since death determinations of human cadavers using soil solution". Journal of Forensic Sciences. 37 (5): 1236–1253. doi:10.1520/JFS13311J. ISSN 0022-1198. PMID 1402750.
- Vass, Arpad A; et al. (May 2002). "Decomposition chemistry of human remains: a new methodology for determining the postmortem interval". Journal of Forensic Sciences. 47 (3): 542–553. doi:10.1520/JFS15294J. ISSN 0022-1198. PMID 12051334.

== See also ==
- Forensic entomological decomposition
- Necrobiome
