= Chemical process of decomposition =

Human body composition
1. Water (64.0%)
2. Protein (20.0%)
3. Fat (10.0%)
4. Carbohydrate (1.00%)
5. Minerals (5.00%)

Decomposition in animals is a process that begins immediately after death and involves the destruction of soft tissue, leaving behind skeletonized remains. The chemical process of decomposition is complex and involves the breakdown of soft tissue, as the body passes through the sequential stages of decomposition. Autolysis and putrefaction also play major roles in the disintegration of cells and tissues.

The human body is composed of approximately: 64% water, 20% protein, 10% fat, 1% carbohydrate, 5% minerals. The decomposition of soft tissue is characterized by the breakdown of these macromolecules, and thus a large proportion of the decomposition products should reflect the amount of protein and fat content initially present in the body. As such, the chemical process of decomposition involves the breakdown of proteins, carbohydrates, lipids, nucleic acids, and bone.

== Protein degradation ==
Proteins make up a variety of different tissues within the body, which may be classified as soft or hard tissue proteins. As such, proteins within the body are not degraded at a uniform rate.

=== Proteolysis ===
Proteolysis is the process that breaks down proteins. It is regulated by moisture, temperature, and bacteria. This process does not occur at a uniform rate and thus some proteins are degraded during early decomposition, while others are degraded during later stages of decomposition. During the early stages of decomposition, soft tissue proteins are broken down. These include proteins that:

- line the gastrointestinal tract and pancreatic epithelium
- form the brain, liver, and kidneys

During later stages of decomposition, more resistant tissue proteins are degraded by the effects of putrefaction. These include:

- reticulin
- muscle protein
- collagen (a hard tissue protein), which survives even longer than the former tissue proteins

Keratin is a protein which is found in skin, hair, and nails. It is most resistant to the enzymes involved in proteolysis and must be broken down by special keratinolytic microorganisms. This is the reason that hair and nails are commonly found with skeletal remains.

==== Proteolysis products ====
In general, proteolysis breaks down proteins into:

- proteoses
- peptones
- polypeptides
- amino acids

Continuing proteolysis leads to the production of phenolic substances. In addition, the following gases will also be produced:

- carbon dioxide
- hydrogen sulphide, which is highly toxic
- ammonia
- methane

The sulfur-containing amino acids cysteine and methionine undergo bacterial decomposition to yield:

- ammonia
- thiols (decomposition gases known for their foul odours)
- pyruvic acid
- sulphides
- hydrogen sulphide gas
  - Ferrous sulphide will be produced if iron is present, which can be seen as a black precipitate

Two common decarboxylation products of protein associated with decomposition are putrescine and cadaverine. These compounds are toxic at high levels and have distinctive, foul odours. It is believed that they are components of the characteristic odours of decomposition commonly detected by cadaver dogs.

A summary of the protein degradation products can be found in Table 1 below.

=== Nitrogen release ===
Nitrogen is a component of amino acids and is released upon deamination. It is typically released in the form of ammonia, which may be used by plants or microbes in the surrounding environment, converted to nitrate, or can accumulate in soil (if the body is located on top of or within soil). It has been suggested that the presence of nitrogen in soil may enhance nearby plant growth.

In acidic soil conditions, ammonia will be converted to ammonium ions, which can be used by plants or microbes. Under alkaline conditions, some of the ammonium ions entering soil may be converted back to ammonia. Any remaining ammonium in the environment can undergo nitrification and denitrification to yield nitrate and nitrite. In the absence of nitrifying bacteria, or organisms capable of oxidizing ammonia, ammonia will accumulate in the soil.

=== Phosphorus release ===
Phosphorus can be released from various components of the body, including proteins (especially those making up nucleic acids), sugar phosphate, and phospholipids. The route phosphorus takes once it is released is complex and relies on the pH of the surrounding environment. In most soils, phosphorus exists as insoluble inorganic complexes, associated with iron, calcium, magnesium, and aluminum. Soil microorganisms can also transform insoluble organic complexes into soluble ones.

== Carbohydrate degradation ==
Early in decomposition, carbohydrates will be broken down by microorganisms. The process begins with the breakdown of glycogen into glucose monomers. These sugar monomers can be completely decomposed to carbon dioxide and water or incompletely decomposed to various organic acids and alcohols, or other oxygenated species, such as ketones, aldehydes, esters and ethers.

Depending on the availability of oxygen in the environment, sugars will be decomposed by different organisms and into different products, although both routes may occur simultaneously. Under aerobic conditions, fungi and bacteria will decompose sugars into the following organic acids:

- glucuronic acid
- citric acid
- oxalic acid

Under anaerobic conditions, bacteria will decompose sugars into:

- lactic acid
- butyric acid
- acetic acid

which are collectively responsible for the acidic environment commonly associated with decomposing bodies.

Other bacterial fermentation products include alcohols, such as butyl and ethyl alcohol, acetone, and gases, such as methane and hydrogen.

A summary of the carbohydrate degradation products can be found in Table 1 below.

== Lipid degradation ==
Lipids in the body are mainly contained in adipose tissue, which is made up of about 5-30% water, 2-3% protein, and 60-85% lipids, by weight, of which 90-99% are triglycerides. Adipose tissue is largely composed of neutral lipids, which collectively refers to triglycerides, diglyercides, phospholipids, and cholesterol esters, of which triglycerides are the most common. The fatty acid content of the triglycerides varies from person to person, but contains oleic acid in the greatest amount, followed by linoleic, palmitoleic, and palmitic acids.

=== Neutral lipid degradation ===
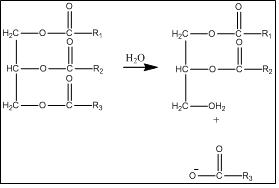
Neutral fat hydrolysis reaction

Neutral lipids are hydrolyzed by lipases shortly after death, to free the fatty acids from their glycerol backbone. This creates a mixture of saturated and unsaturated fatty acids. Under the right conditions (when sufficient water and bacterial enzymes are present), neutral lipids will be completely degraded until they are reduced to fatty acids. Under suitable conditions, the fatty acids can be transformed into adipocere. In contrast, fatty acids may react with sodium and potassium ions present in tissue, to produce salts of fatty acids. When the body is located near soil, the sodium and potassium ions can be replaced by calcium and magnesium ions to form soaps of saturated fatty acids, which can also contribute to the formation of adipocere.

=== Fatty acid degradation ===
The fatty acids resulting from hydrolysis can undergo one of two routes of degradation, depending on the availability of oxygen. It is possible, however, for both routes to take place at the same time in different areas of the body.

==== Anaerobic degradation ====
Anaerobic bacteria dominate within a body following death, which promote the anaerobic degradation of fatty acids by hydrogenation. The process of hydrogenation transforms unsaturated bonds (double and triple bonds) into single bonds. This essentially increases the amounts of saturated fatty acids, while decreasing the proportion of unsaturated fatty acids. Therefore, hydrogenation of oleic and palmitoleic acids, for example, will yield stearic, and palmitic acids, respectively.

$$\ce{\overset{unsaturated\ fatty\ acid}{CHOO-(CH2)7.CH=CH-(CH2)5.CH3} + H2 ->[\ce{bacterial\ enzymes}] \overset{saturated\ fatty\ acid}{CHOO-(CH2)7.CH2-CH2-(CH2)5.CH3}}$$

==== Aerobic degradation ====
In the presence of oxygen, the fatty acids will undergo oxidation. Lipid oxidation is a chain reaction process in which oxygen attacks the double bond in a fatty acid, to yield peroxide linkages. Eventually, the process will produce aldehydes and ketones.

- Initiation
  $$\ce{{RH} + O2 -> {R} + OH}$$
- Propagation
  $$\begin{array}{l}
\ce{{R} + O2 -> ROO}\\
\ce{{ROO} + RH -> {ROOH} + R}
\end{array}$$
- Termination
  $$\begin{array}{l}
\ce{{R} + R -> RR}\\
\ce{{R} + ROO -> ROOR}\\
\ce{{ROO} + ROO -> {ROOR} + O2}
\end{array}$$

A summary of the lipid degradation products can be found in Table 1 below.

== Nucleic acid degradation ==
The breakdown of nucleic acids produces nitrogenous bases, phosphates, and sugars. These three products are further broken down by degradation pathways of other macromolecules. The nitrogen from the nitrogenous bases will be transformed in the same way that it is in proteins. Similarly, phosphates will be released from the body and undergo the same changes as those released from proteins and phospholipids. Finally, sugars, also known as carbohydrates, will be degraded based on the availability of oxygen.

== Bone degradation ==
Bone is a composite tissue that is made up of three main fractions:

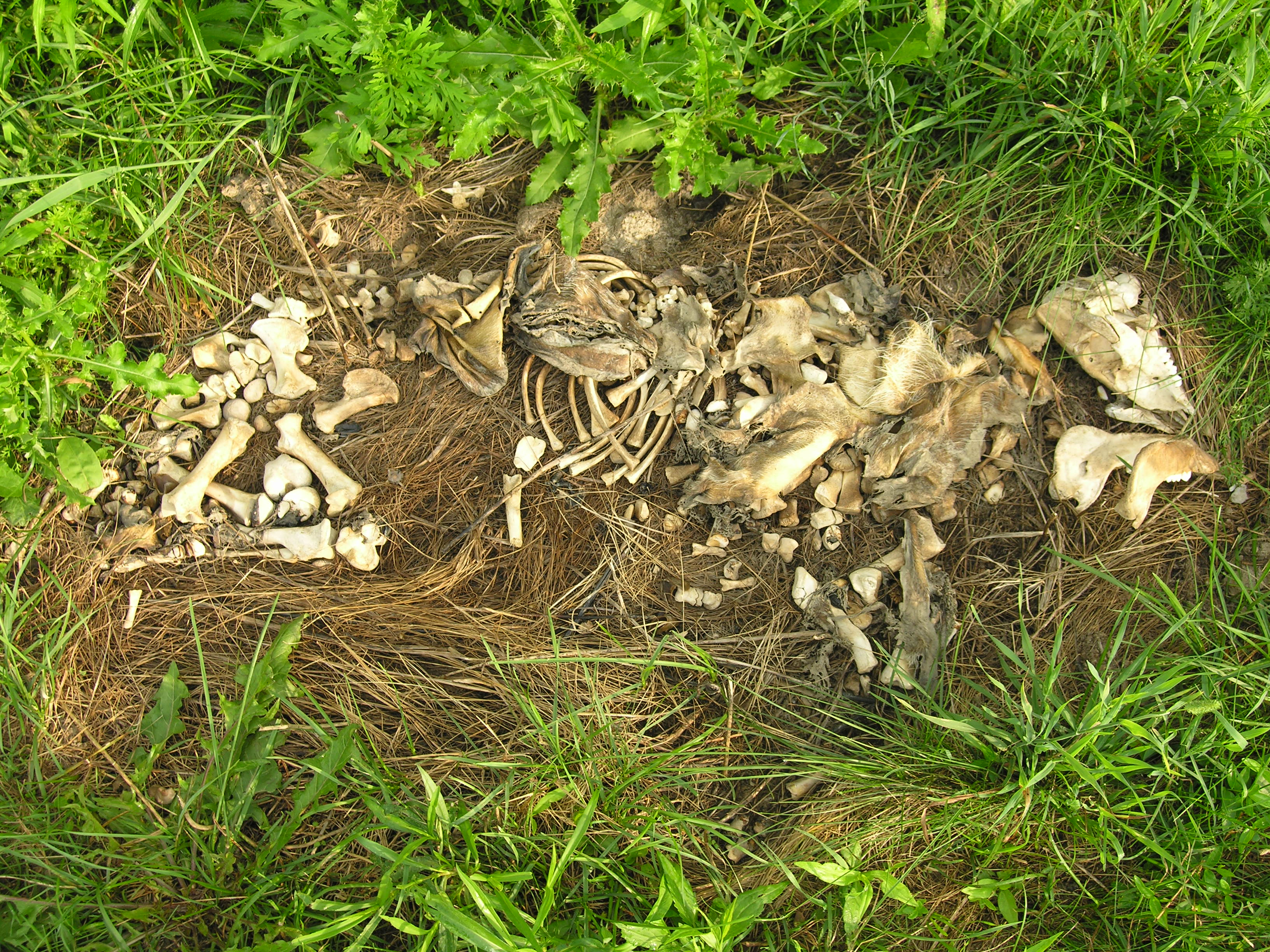
Partially skeletonized pig (sus Scrofa)

1. a protein fraction that mainly consists of collagen (a hard tissue protein that is more resistant to degradation than other tissue proteins), which serves as support
2. a mineral fraction that consists of hydroxyapatite(the mineral that contains the calcium and phosphorus in a bone), which stiffens the protein structure
3. a ground substance made of other organic compounds

The collagen and hydroxyapatite are held together by a strong protein-mineral bond that provides bone with its strength and its ability to remain long after the soft tissue of a body has been degraded.

The process that degrades bone is referred to as diagenesis. The first step in the process involves the elimination of the organic collagen fraction by the action of bacterial collagenases. These collagenases break down protein into peptides. The peptides are subsequently reduced to their constituent amino acids, which can be leached away by groundwater. Once the collagen has been removed from bone, the hydroxyapatite content is degraded by inorganic mineral weathering, meaning that important ions, such as calcium, are lost to the environment. The strong protein-mineral bond that provided bone with its strength will become compromised by this degradation, leading to an overall weakened structure, which will continue to weaken until full disintegration of bone occurs.

=== Factors affecting bone degradation ===
Bone is quite resistant to degradation but will eventually be broken down by physical breaking, decalcification, and dissolution. The rate at which bone is degraded, however, is highly dependent on its surrounding environment. When soil is present, its destruction is influenced by both abiotic (water, temperature, soil type, and pH) and biotic (fauna and flora) agents.

==== Abiotic factors ====
Water accelerates the process by leaching essential organic minerals from bone. As such, soil type plays a role, because it will affect the water content of the environment. For example, some soils, like clay soils, retain water better than others, like sandy or silty soils. Further, acidic soils are better able to dissolve the inorganic matrix of hydroxyapatite than basic soils, thus accelerating the disintegration of bone.

==== Biotic factors ====
Microorganisms, mainly bacteria and fungi, play a role in bone degradation. They are capable of invading bone tissue and causing minerals to leach into the surrounding environment, leading to disturbances in its structure. Small and large mammals often disturb bones by removing them from grave sites or gnawing on them, which contributes to their destruction. Finally, plant roots located above burial sites can be extremely destructive to bone. Fine roots can travel through the tissue and split long bones, while larger roots can produce openings in bones that may be mistaken for fractures.
