= Neutral fat =

Chemical structure of an example triglyceride.

Neutral fats, also known as true fats, are simple lipids formed by the dehydration synthesis of one or more fatty acids with an alcohol such as glycerol. Neutral fats are commonly referred to as triglycerides. These lipids are hydrophobic and dense due to their long hydrocarbon chains, and their main biological function is energy storage as body fat.

Neutral fats can be tightly packed due to the structure of their fatty acid chains. While triglycerides are primarily used for energy storage, they may also contribute to lipid membranes, where they help provide flexibility. Additionally, they can serve as precursors or components of signalling molecules.

A wide variety of neutral fats exist, owing to the diversity of fatty acids that can be incorporated and the multiple bonding arrangements possible with glycerol. An example is a monoglyceride, which has one fatty acid combined with glycerol, a diglyceride, which has two fatty acids combined with glycerol, or a triglyceride, which has three fatty acids combined with glycerol.

== Triglycerides ==
Triglycerides are formed from the esterification of three fatty acids with one glycerol molecule, which is a type of alcohol. This process releases three water molecules. The term 'triglyceride' refers to the number of fatty acids esterified to one molecule of glycerol.

Usually, the three types of fatty acids in a triglyceride are different, which classifies them as mixed fats. If all three fatty acids are the same, the result is a simple fat. Examples of simple fats include tripalmitin and tristearin.
