= Skeletonization =

Remains of an organism after soft tissues have broken down after death

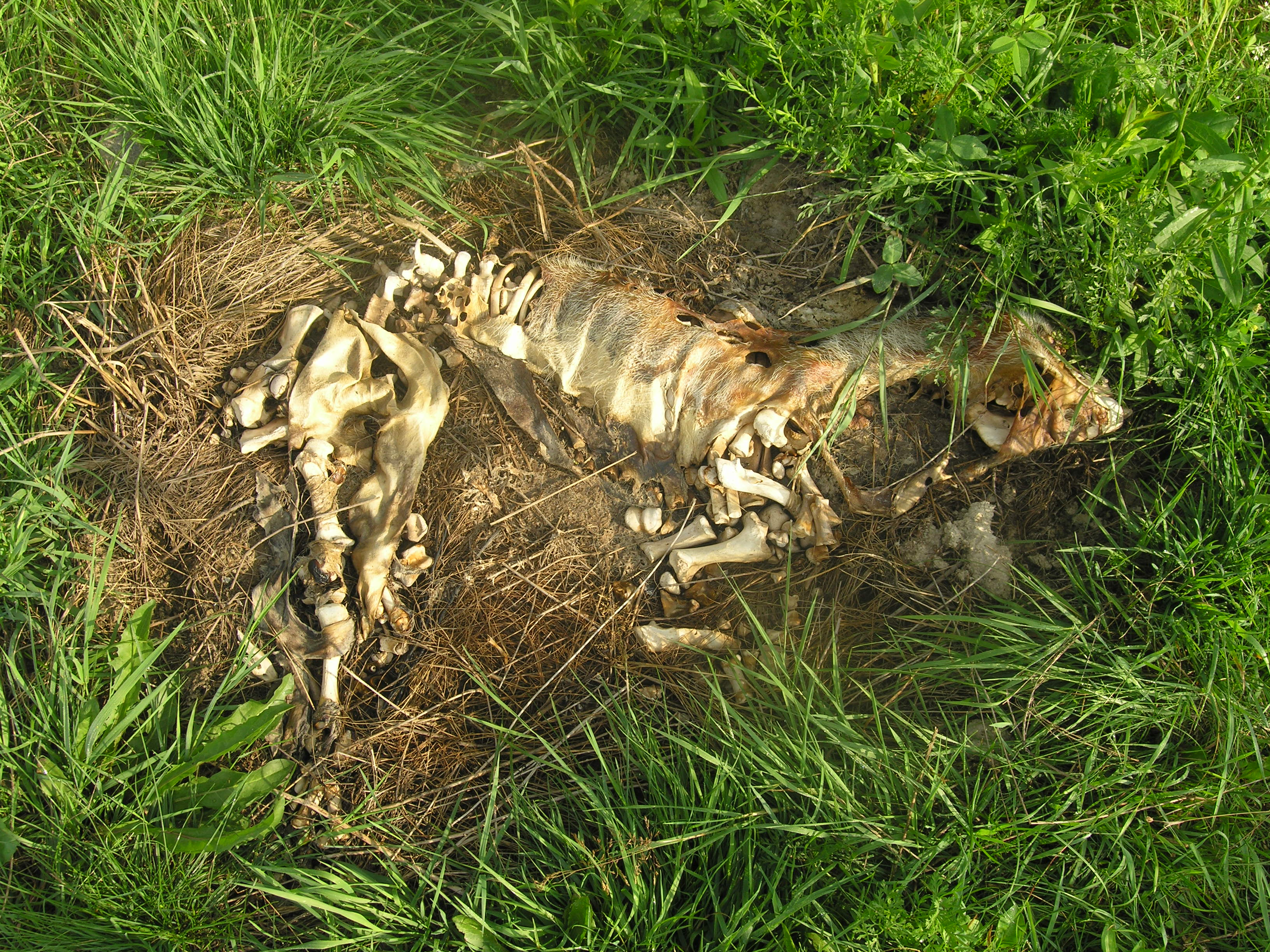
Partly skeletonized pig, seven weeks after death.

Skeletonization is the state of a dead organism after undergoing decomposition. Skeletonization refers to the final stage of decomposition, during which the last vestiges of the soft tissues of a corpse or carcass have decayed or dried to the point that the skeleton is exposed. By the end of the skeletonization process, all soft tissue will have been eliminated, leaving only disarticulated bones.

== Timeline ==
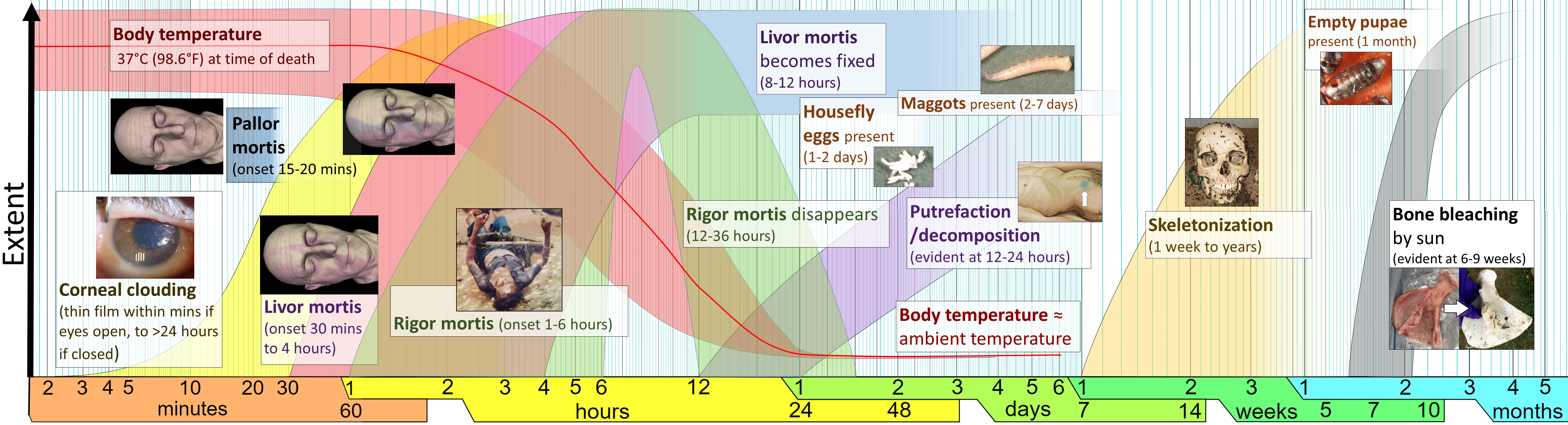
Timeline of postmortem changes (stages of death), with skeletonization near right side.

In a temperate climate, it usually requires three weeks to several years for a body to completely decompose into a skeleton, depending on factors such as temperature, humidity, presence of insects, and submergence in a substrate such as water. In tropical climates, skeletonization can occur in weeks, while in tundra areas, skeletonization may take years or may never occur, if freezing temperatures persist. Natural embalming processes in peat bogs or salt deserts can delay the process indefinitely, sometimes resulting in natural mummification.

The rate of skeletonization and the present condition of a corpse or carcass can be used to determine the time of death. Skeletonization occurs much quicker if vertebrate scavengers consume the corpse's flesh. A large flock of vultures can reduce a human corpse or carcass to a skeleton within few hours. After skeletonization, if scavenging animals do not destroy or remove the bones, acids in many fertile soils take about 20 years to completely dissolve the skeleton of mid- to large-size mammals, such as humans, leaving no trace of the organism. In neutral-pH soil or sand, the skeleton can persist for hundreds of years before it finally disintegrates. Alternately, especially in very fine, dry, salty, anoxic, or mildly alkaline soils, bones may undergo fossilization, converting into minerals that may persist indefinitely.

== Classification procedures of skeletal significance ==
Before analysing skeletal remains, it is essential to categorise the skeletal remains for its respective discipline for further investigation. In other words, researchers have to determine the skeletal remains’ significance. There are key procedures to follow in order to categorise the skeletal remains. First, extraneous materials that are not bones or teeth should be extinguished. Subsequently, researchers need to identify human bones from skeletal remains. Human bones will be examined for their significance deemed for forensic investigation purposes only. Otherwise, human bones will be proceeded to the next examination on the alternative possible significance that the skeletal remains have. Other than forensic contexts, skeletal remains can be classified as education or archaeological material education or anatomical material, war memorial items or archaeological materials which could be cemetery remains traced back from prehistorical or historical times.

=== Distinguishing non-human and human bones ===
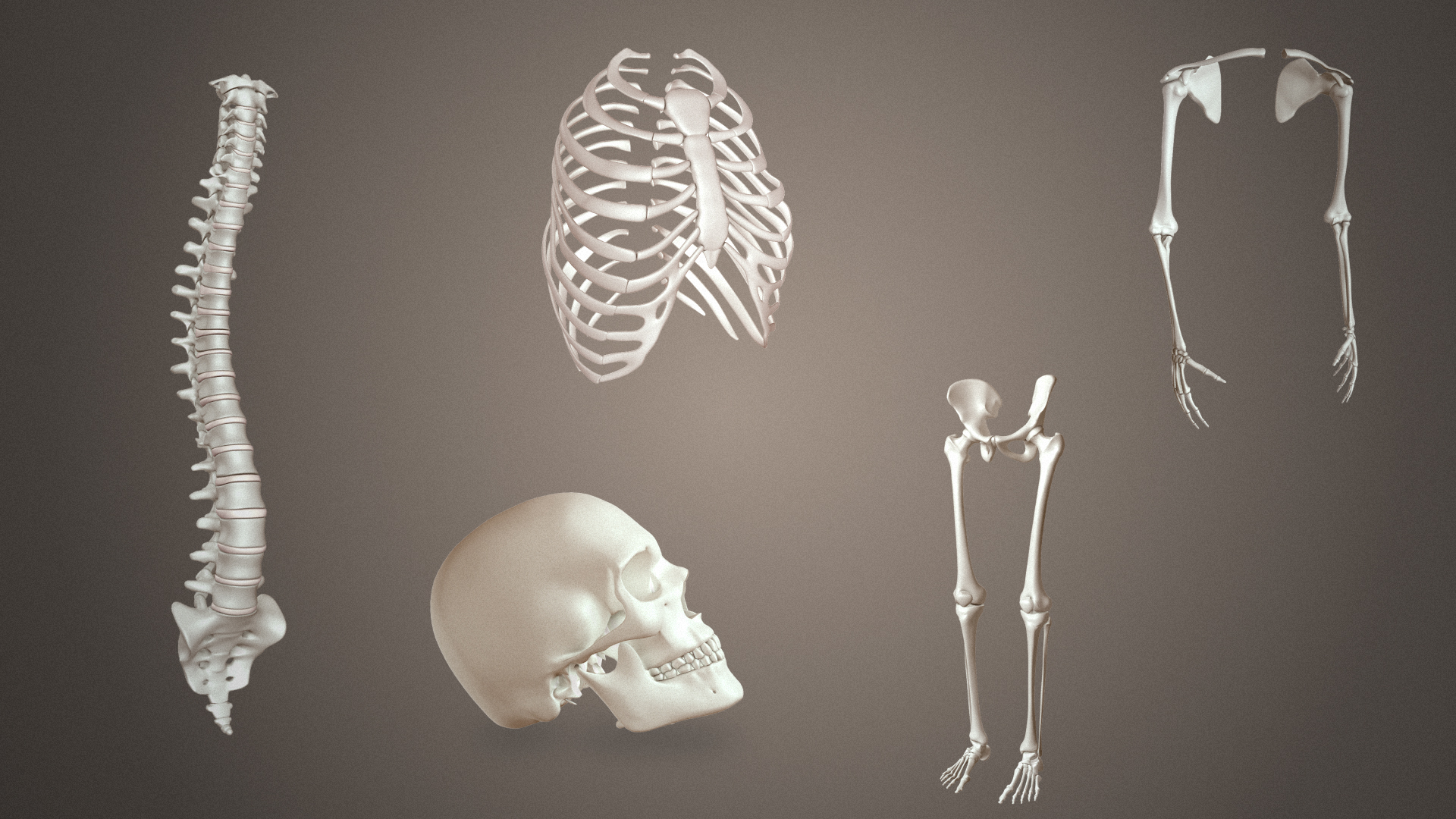
Different types of bones found in the human body, including the skull, spine, rib cage and limbs.

Once a pool of skeletal remains is collected, bones and non bone materials will be mixed together. In order to avoid non bone materials being misinterpreted as bones, the following methods are applied to increase the efficiency of distinguishing bones and non bone materials. A microscope can be used to examine whether there is an absence of graininess that will only appear on a bone's surface. Scanning electron microscopy and energy- dispersive X- ray spectroscopy are used to examine the chemical composition of any materials that are suspected to be bones. The results of the chemical composition test will be compared with the bone specimens of the FBI's Spectral Library for Identification database. Non bone materials are obvious to be detected since non bone materials do not have the same ratio of calcium-to-phosphorus that bones have.

When the suspected material is identified as bone, the next procedure is to categorise which bones belong to humans or animals. This procedure is conducted by forensic anthropologists since their daily tasks are to identify human bones. There are skeletal variations in both human and nonhuman bones. In terms of human bones, forensic anthropologists need to categorise human bones in accordance to their respective biological ages through investigating the maturity of the human bones. If the size of a piece of bone is suspected of having the same size of young adult bones, researchers will proceed to consider the possible factor of maturity and the presence of fused epiphyses for further analysis of classifying a bone as a young adult bone or a non bone. Small fragments of human bones or large mammalian animal bones will be easily confused occasionally.

Hence, microscopic methods are used to determine the external features of the bone's surface. Given that the microscopic pattern of nonhuman bones is plexiform or fibrolamellar if the primary osteon has the linear arrangement of rows or bands, analysing the microscopic anatomy of large mammalian bone fragments enables the forensic anthropologists to distinguish large mammals. This does not mean that microscopic methods can be applied in identifying human bones. Protein radioimmunoassay is a biomolecular method that identifies human bones and eliminates any nonhuman bones.

=== Forensic significance evaluation ===
Once the skeletal remains are excavated, forensic anthropologists need to ensure the skeletal remains have fulfilled a contextual criteria upon determining the forensic significance of the skeletal remains. The clothing that is being left with the skeletons must be contemporary clothing, absence of mortuary artefacts and buried in a discordant body posture. The timing of the bone quality is also crucial for distinguishing bones from archaeological bones, the key point to be marked on is the freshness of the bone in which postmortem intervals will be useful for justifying contemporary skeletal remains from skeletons served for archaeological purposes. The place of burial, physical characteristics and artefacts next to the skeletal remains will be taken into consideration to determine its forensic significance.

=== Archaeological significance evaluation ===
If the skeletal remains are deemed as materials that have no forensic significance, the skeletal remains will proceed to an examination of its archaeological significance. This will be determined if the skeletal remains are situated in a burial setting and the presence of accompanied artefacts beside the skeletons.

== Indications ==
The following information listed below is the information that was derived from skeletons.

=== Sex ===
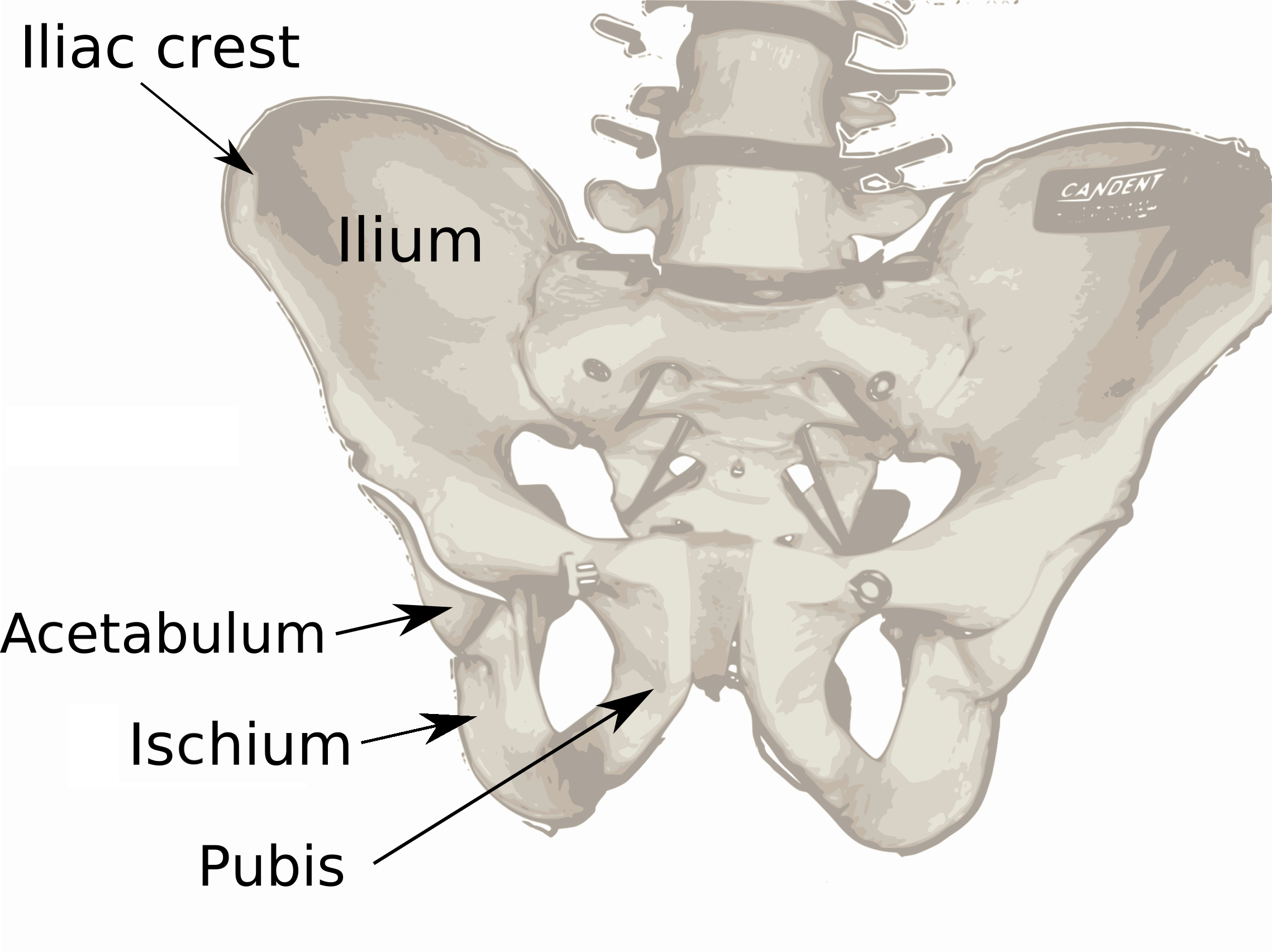
A labeled diagram of the human pelvis

The pelvis tends to display sexually dimorphic characteristics, and thus can be used to infer the sex of the skeleton. Specifically, the hip bone is dissected into three segments which are the sacroiliac segment, ischiopubic segment and acetabular segment. Any changes in the shape of the sciatic notch of the sacroiliac segment can help indicate the sex and the sexual maturation of the skeleton. Females tend to have a larger sciatic notch. The ischiopubic segment indicates the process of sexual dimorphism during puberty. For example, the subpubic angle and pubis of females in the ischiopubic segment tends to be larger. Sub-pubic concavity is usually only present in females. The acetabular segment indicates the spatial organisation of the general pelvic structure. Through observing the physical characteristics derived from the hip bones, females tend to have a U-shape subpubic angle and men tend to have a V-shape subpubic angle.

The female pelvis is usually wider than that of the male. A possible reason for these differences is because a narrow pelvis is may be more efficient for bipedal movement, evidenced by elite runners having narrower pelvic bones, so male humans benefit from a narrower pelvis. However, a narrow pelvis hinders childbirth, so female humans benefit from a pelvis that balances efficient locomotion with safe reproduction.

Consequently, males tend to have stronger mastoid processes on the sides, with nuchal crests and glabellae located in the front and the back respectively.

If the pelvic bone is absent from the skeletal specimen, the size and resiliency of the bones will be examined to infer sex. The quality of nutrition that the deceased specimen had in its lifetime will affect the size and resiliency of its bones, so this analysis cannot be considered entirely definitive in assigning sex to a skeleton.

=== Trauma ===
Trauma means the injury that had occurred on a deceased individual's living tissue which is inflicted by an external force or mechanism regardless of intentional or incidental means. Analysing trauma provides insight in detecting and explaining the lesions on the deceased individual or a respective population. By associating the relationship between trauma and the demographic information derived from the skeleton, the relationship between them facilitates the process of interpreting the socio- cultural variables that inflicted the trauma. Trauma analysis is conducted with the cooperation between forensic pathologists and anthropologists to establish the reason and manner of death. The occurrence of trauma is dissected into three stages which are ante- mortem, peri- mortem and post- mortem trauma. While peri- and post- mortem trauma that occurred simultaneously cannot provide hints for forensic pathologists and anthropologists, post- mortem trauma that occurred after the decomposition stage reveals the distinction between damage inflicted on dried and de- fleshed bones.

=== Age ===
Skeletal age estimation is written in the format of ranges because an individual's chronological age does not necessarily parallel his or her biological age. Individual health, family genetics and environmental stressors affect the skeleton age. Hence, the range format is written in the aim of combining the estimation of the skeleton's chronological age and individual variability. To avoid biased examinations in skeletal age estimation, at least more than one indicators is required. In order to investigate if there is an evidence of growth and development on the skeletons, the evolving pattern and fusion of ossification centers can be used to determine that the skeletons are developed. Thus, this means the skeletons are proven to be entering the stage of maturation.

== Preservation ==
Skeletons should be carefully managed and protected in order to retain their original state for further research purposes in any circumstances, for instance: educational, archaeological, forensic research. Applying the same case for animal skeletons, there are procedures to follow in the aim of ensuring the skeletal remains are reserved carefully for research purposes in the future. There are various possible sizes of collections that researchers might want to reserve for future investigation. For smaller sizes of bones collections which will be commonly applied to any researchers who retain them for archaeological or zoological educational purposes, it is suggested to organise those bones into categories, for instance: age group, tribal or ethnicity group, or sex. The storage method of such small and sophisticated types of bones is recommended to be placed in a sliding shelf. However, larger collections are served for academic disciplines that need a broad investigation instead of just focusing on a single piece of bone. Thus, the preservation and care management method will be different from above. First, researchers have to note down the basic demographic and mortality information which will be useful for future comparisons between skeletons. Similarly, for the skeletal remains collected for display or research purposes in the museum, the physical characteristics and the skeletal remains’ archaeological category has to be documented in order to acknowledge the background information of the skeletal remains. Next, bones should be carefully labelled and avoid chemical substances that will affect the original state of the bone that will affect accuracy of future investigation.

== Ethics and work integrity ==
Cultural and social factors affect the objectivity principle required to investigate a corpse. An ethical dilemma exists when forensic anthropologists and mortuary archaeologists need to adapt to the cultural context that they are working in respectively while obliged to uphold objectivity when they are engaging in skeletal analysis. Both forensic anthropologists and mortuary archaeologists should not enable the working conditions of a particular environment justifying their standard of investigation process.

Preceded by Decomposition	Stages of human development Skeletonization	Succeeded by Fossilization
