= Microbiology of decomposition =

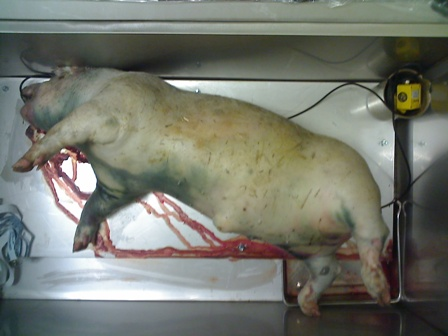
Decomposing pig showing signs of bloat and discoloration, a result of microbial proliferation within the body.

Microbiology of decomposition is the study of all microorganisms involved in decomposition, the chemical and physical processes during which organic matter is broken down and reduced to its original elements.

Decomposition microbiology can be divided into two fields of interest, namely the decomposition of plant materials and the decomposition of cadavers and carcasses.

The decomposition of plant materials is commonly studied in order to understand the cycling of carbon within a given environment and to understand the subsequent impacts on soil quality. Plant material decomposition is also often referred to as composting. The decomposition of cadavers and carcasses has become an important field of study within forensic taphonomy.

== Decomposition microbiology of plant materials ==
The breakdown of vegetation is highly dependent on oxygen and moisture levels. During decomposition, microorganisms require oxygen for their respiration. If anaerobic conditions dominate the decomposition environment, microbial activity will be slow and thus decomposition will be slow. Appropriate moisture levels are required for microorganisms to proliferate and to actively decompose organic matter. In arid environments, bacteria and fungi dry out and are unable to take part in decomposition. In wet environments, anaerobic conditions will develop and decomposition can also be considerably slowed down. Decomposing microorganisms also require the appropriate plant substrates in order to achieve good levels of decomposition. This usually translates to having appropriate carbon to nitrogen ratios (C:N). The ideal composting carbon-to-nitrogen ratio is thought to be approximately 30:1. As in any microbial process, the decomposition of plant litter by microorganisms will also be dependent on temperature. For example, leaves on the ground will not undergo decomposition during the winter months where snow cover occurs as temperatures are too low to sustain microbial activities.

== Decomposition microbiology of cadavers and carcasses ==
The decomposition processes of cadavers and carcasses are studied within the field of forensic taphonomy in order to:

- aid in the estimation of post-mortem interval (PMI) or time since death;
- aid in the location of potential clandestine graves.

Decomposition microbiology as applied to forensic taphonomy can be divided into 2 groups of studies:

- microorganisms from within the body;
- microorganisms from the decomposition environment.

=== Microorganisms in the body ===
When considering cadavers and carcasses, putrefaction is the proliferation of microorganisms within the body following death and also encompasses the breakdown of tissues brought upon by the growth of bacteria. The first signs of putrefaction are usually the discolorations of the body which can vary between shades of green, blue, red or black depending on 1) where the color changes are observed and 2) how far along within the decomposition process the observation is made. This phenomenon is known as marbling. Discolorations are the results of bile pigments being released following an enzymatic attack of the liver, gallbladder and pancreas and the release of hemoglobin breakdown products. Proliferation of bacteria throughout the body is accompanied with the production of considerable amounts of gases due to their capacities of fermentation. As gases accumulate within the bodily cavities the body appears to swell as it enters the bloat stage of decomposition.

As oxygen is present within a body at the beginning of decomposition, aerobic bacteria flourish during the first stages of the process. As the microbial population increases, an accumulation of gases changes the environment into anaerobic conditions which is consequently followed by a change to anaerobic bacteria. Gastro-intestinal bacteria are thought to be responsible for the majority of the putrefactive processes that occur in cadavers and carcasses. This can be in part attributed to the impressive concentrations of viable gastro-intestinal organisms and the metabolic capacities they possess allowing them to use an array of different nutrient sources. Gastro-intestinal bacteria are also capable of migrating from the gut to any other region of the body by using the lymphatic system and blood vessels. Furthermore, we know that coliform varieties of Staphylococcus are important members of the aerobic putrefactive bacteria and that members of the genus Clostridium make up a large part of anaerobic putrefactive bacteria.

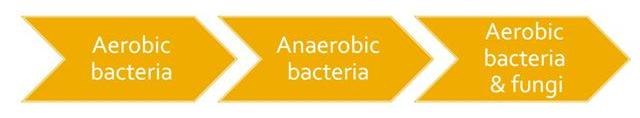
Proposed evolution of microorganisms within the body during decomposition. As oxygen is available at the beginning of decomposition, aerobic microorganisms flourish and quickly deplete the oxygen. Anaerobic bacteria can then proliferate in the body. Later in the decomposition process, fungi and bacteria from the environment will also become involved in the process.

=== Microorganisms outside the body ===
Cadavers and carcasses are usually left to decompose in contact with soil whether through burial in a grave or if left to decompose on the soil surface. This allows microorganisms in the soil and air to come in contact with the body and to take part in the decomposition process. Soil microorganism communities also undergo changes as a result of decomposition fluids leaching in the environment. Cadavers and carcasses often show signs of fungal growth suggesting that fungi use the body as a source of nutrients.

The exact impacts that decomposition may have on surrounding soil microbial communities remains unclear as some studies have shown increases in microbial biomass following decomposition whereas other have seen decreases. It is likely that the survival of microorganisms throughout the decomposition process is highly dependent of a multitude of environmental factors including pH, temperature and moisture.

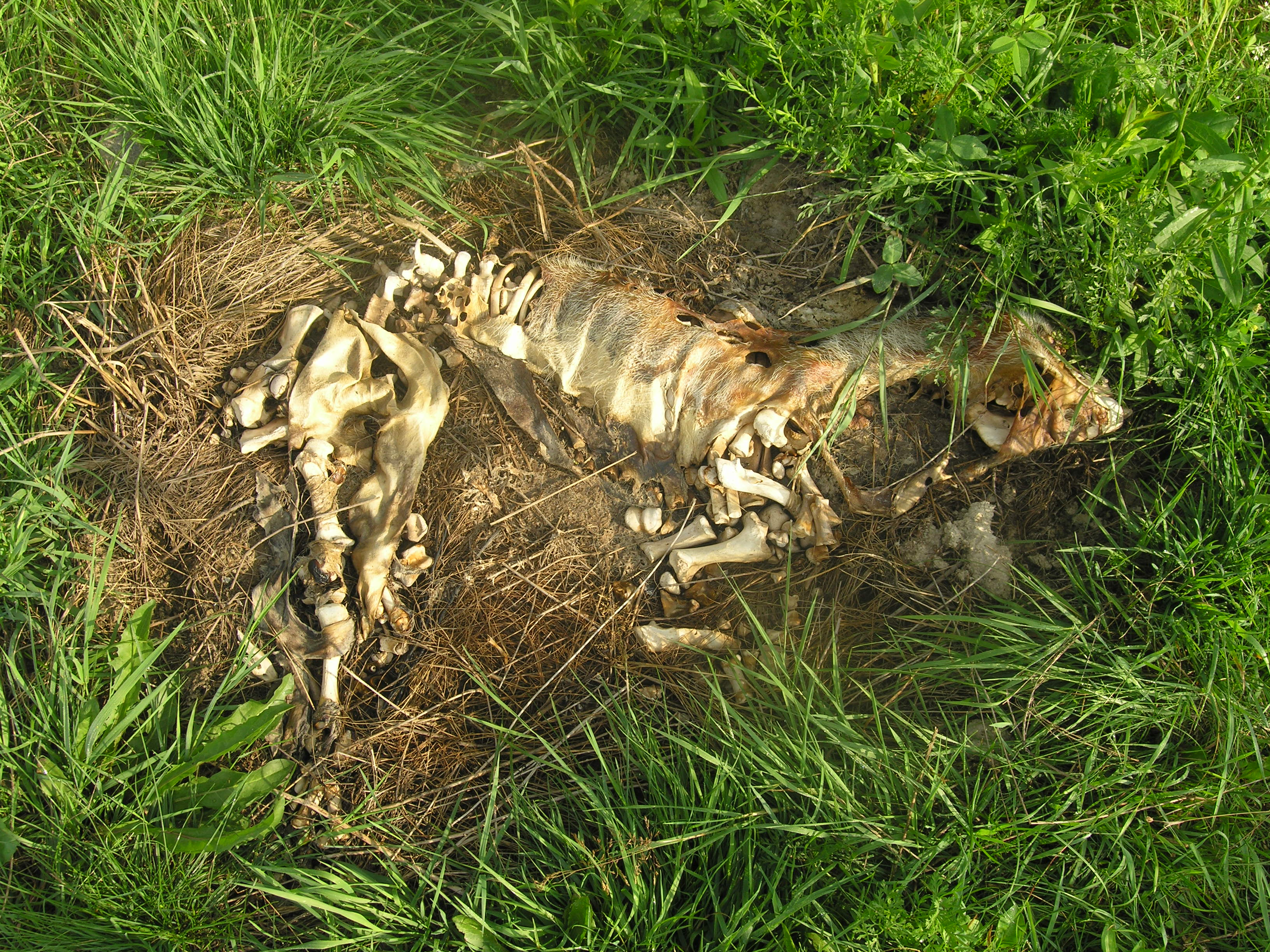
Skeletonized pig carcass showing the production of a cadaver decomposition island surrounding the remains as a result of leaching of decomposition fluids into the surrounding environment.

==== Decomposition fluids and soil microbiology ====
Decomposition fluids entering the soil represent an important influx of organic matter and can also contain a large microbial load of organisms from the body. The area where the majority of the decomposition fluid leaches into the soil is often referred to as a cadaver decomposition island (CDI). It has been observed that decomposition can have a favorable influence on the growth of plants due to increased fertility, a useful tool when trying to locate clandestine graves. The changes in the concentration of nutrients can have lasting effects that are still seen years after a body or carcass has completely disappeared. The influence that the surge in nutrients can have on the microorganisms and vegetation of a given site is not well understood but it appears that decomposition initially has an inhibitory effect for an initial stage before entering a second stage of increased growth.

==== Decomposition fungi ====
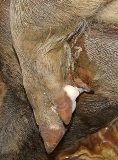
Fungal mycelia (white) on hoof of a deceased pig

It is well known that fungi are heterotrophic for carbon compounds and almost all other nutrients they require. They must obtain these through saprophytic or parasitic associations with their hosts which implicates them in many decomposition processes.

Two major groups of fungi have been identified as being linked to cadaver decomposition:

- ammonia fungi
- post-putrefactive fungi

Ammonia fungi are broken-down into two groups referred to as "early stage fungi" and "late stage fungi." Such a classification is possible due to the successions that are observed between the types of fungi that fruit in or around a burial environment. The progression between the two groups occurs following the release of nitrogenous products from a body in decomposition. Early stage fungi are described as being ascomycetes, deuteromycetes and saprophytic basidiomycetes whereas late stage fungi consisted of ectomycorrhizal basidiomycetes.

==== Decomposition fungi as PMI estimators ====
Considering the number of forensic cases in which significant amounts of mycelia are observed is quite high, investigating cadaver associated mycota may prove valuable to the scientific community as they have much forensic potential.

Only one attempt at using fungi as a PMI marker in a forensic case has been published to date. The study reported the presence of two types of fungi (Penicillium and Aspergillus) on a body found in a well in Japan and stated that they could estimate PMI as being approximately ten days based on the known growth cycles of the fungi in question.

== See also ==
- Necrobiome
