= Decomposition =

Process of breaking down organic matter

Decomposition of strawberries, reverse time lapse

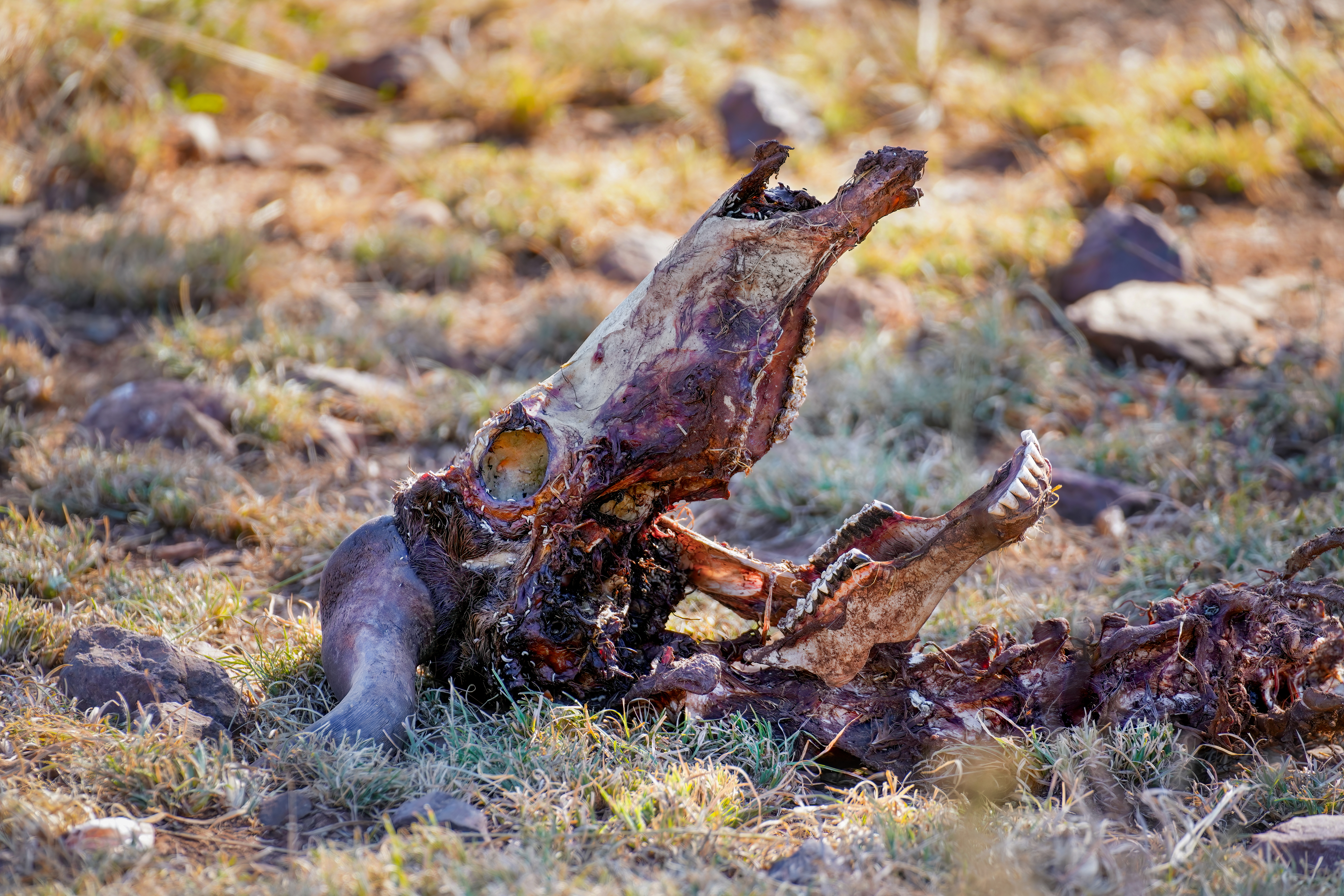
African buffalo skull decomposing in the Serengeti National Park, Tanzania

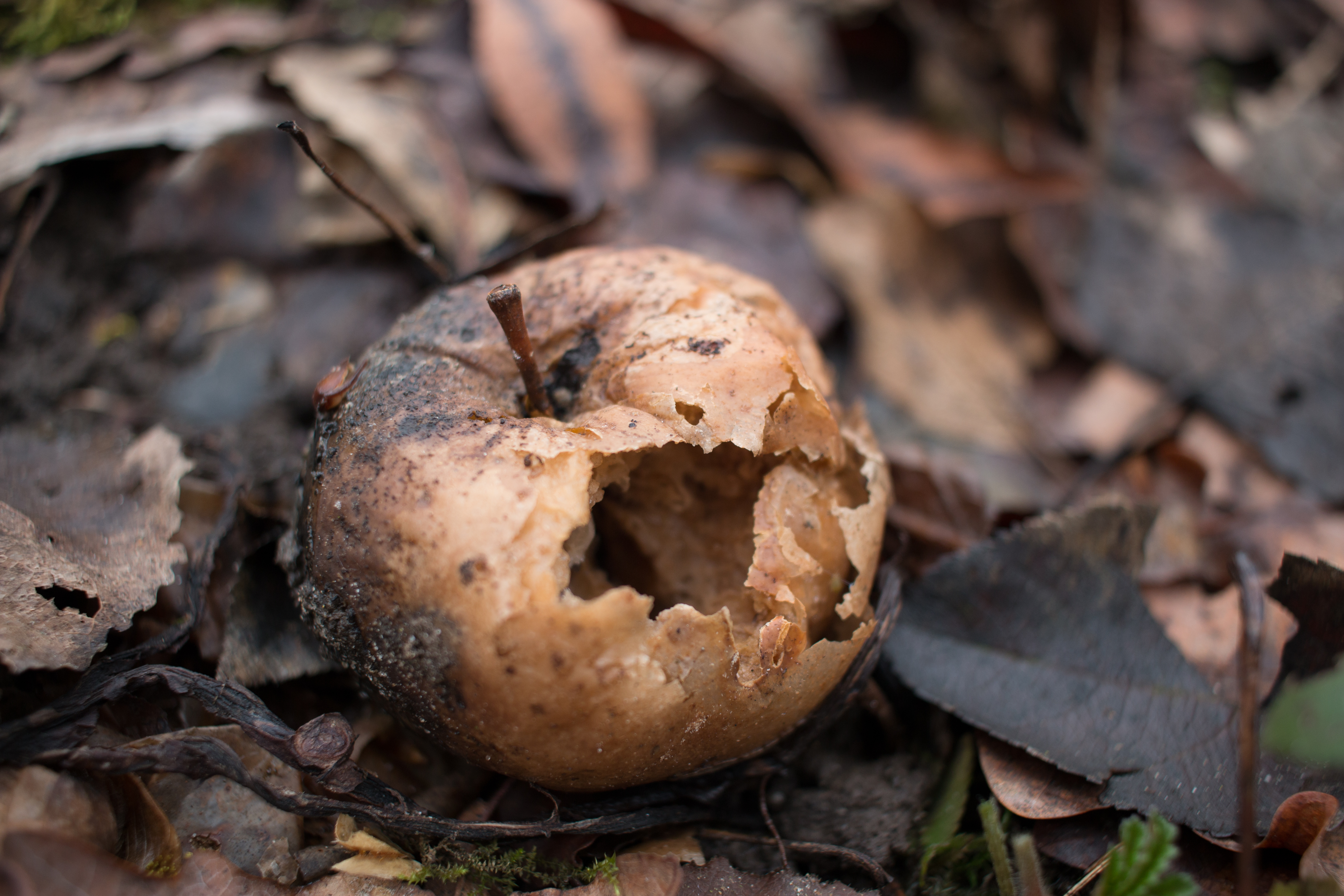
A rotten apple after it fell from a tree

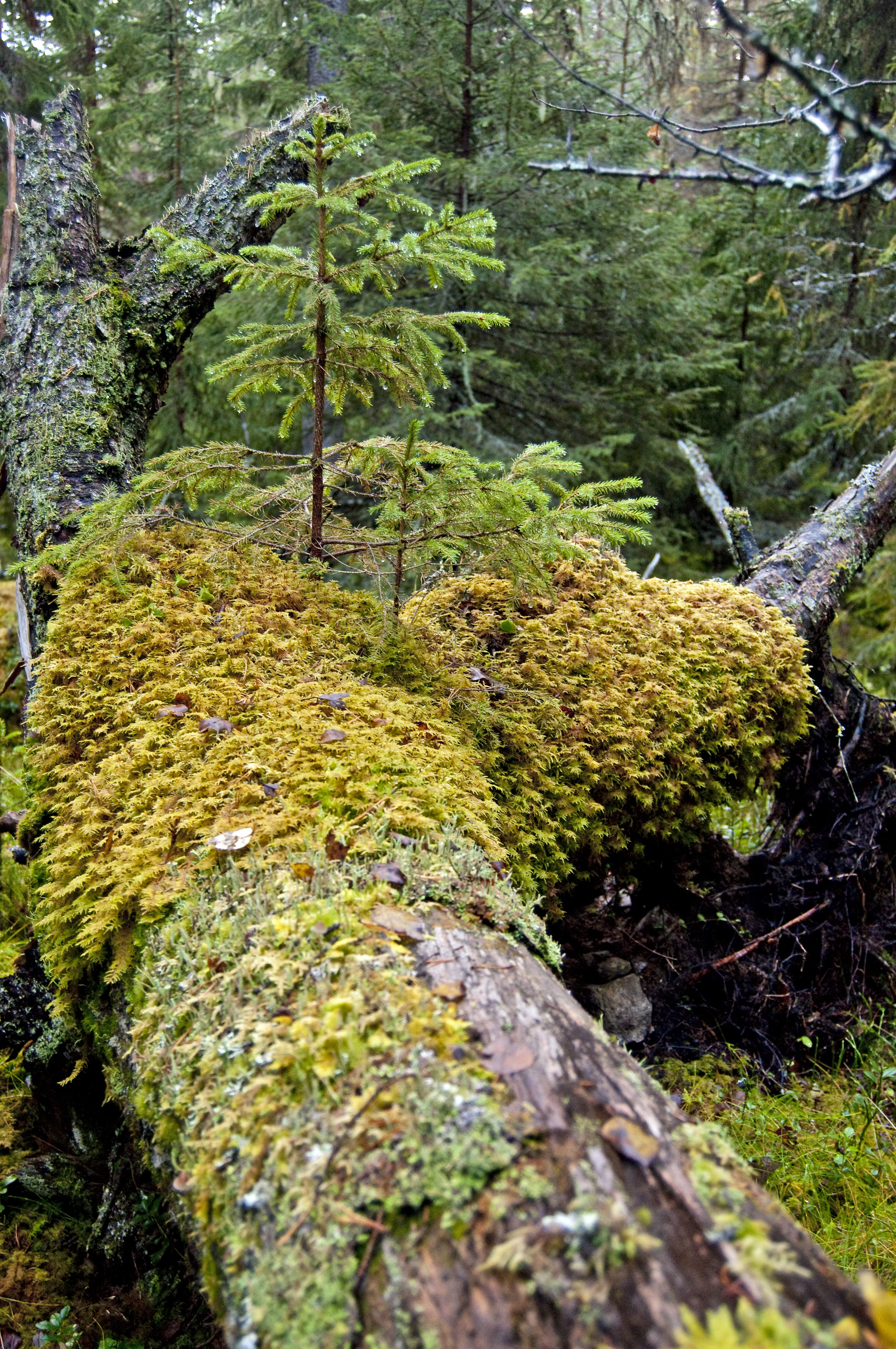
Decomposing fallen nurse log in a forest

Decomposition is the process by which dead organic substances are broken down into simpler organic or inorganic matter such as carbon dioxide, water, simple sugars and mineral salts. The process is a part of the nutrient cycle and is essential for recycling the finite matter that occupies physical space in the biosphere. Bodies of living organisms begin to decompose shortly after death. Although no two organisms decompose in the same way, they all undergo the same sequential stages of decomposition. Decomposition can be a gradual process for organisms that have extended periods of dormancy.

One can differentiate abiotic decomposition from biotic decomposition (biodegradation); the former means "the degradation of a substance by chemical or physical processes", e.g., hydrolysis; the latter means "the metabolic breakdown of materials into simpler components by living organisms", typically by microorganisms. Animals, such as earthworms, also help decompose the organic materials on and in soil through their activities. Organisms that do this are known as decomposers or detritivores.

The science which studies decomposition is generally referred to as taphonomy from the Greek word taphos, meaning 'tomb'.

== In animals ==
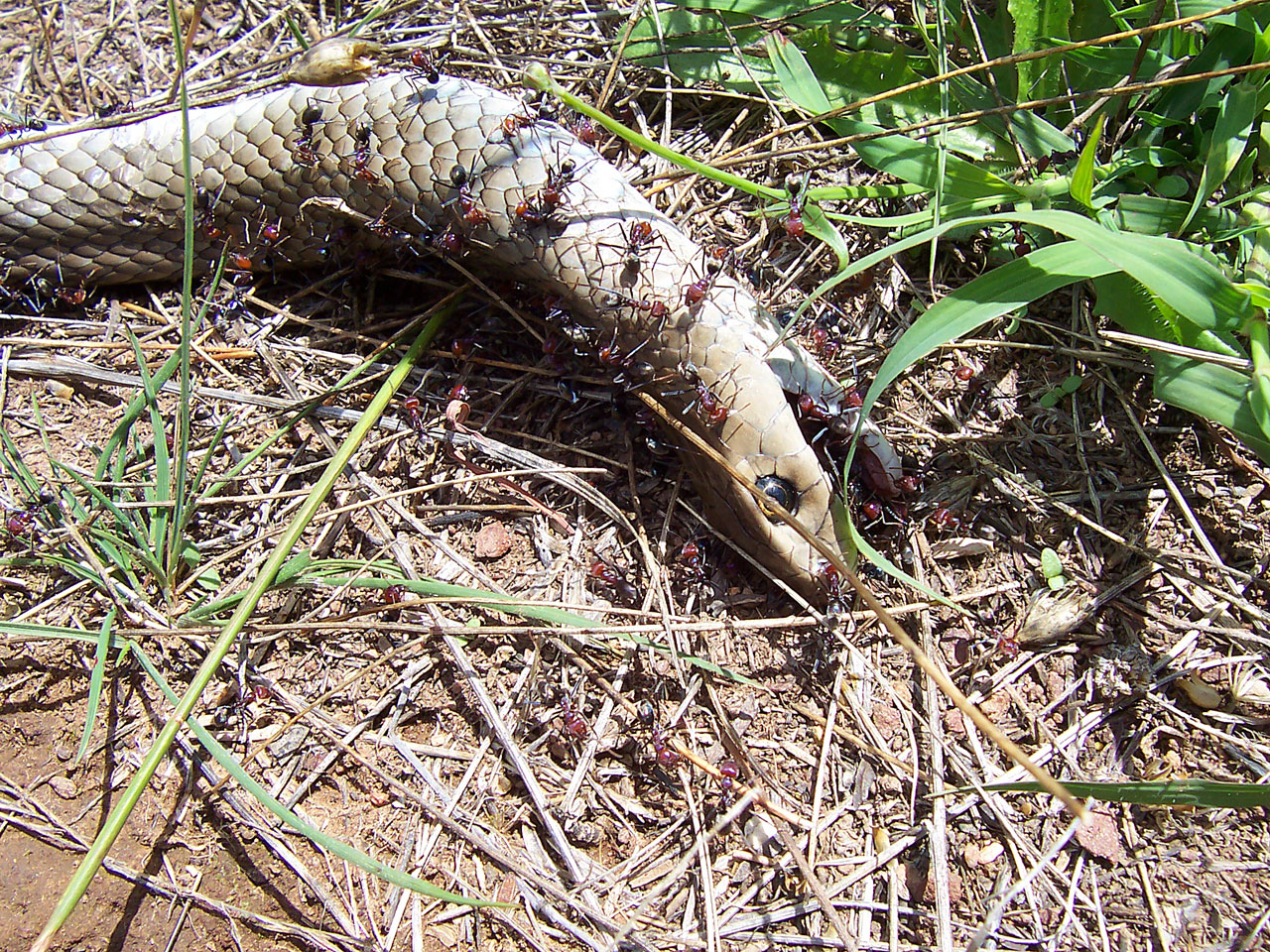
Ants eating a dead snake

Decomposition will begin at the moment of death, caused by two factors: autolysis, the breaking down of tissues by the body's own internal chemicals and enzymes, and putrefaction, the breakdown of tissues by bacteria. These processes release compounds such as cadaverine and putrescine, that are the chief source of the unmistakably putrid odor of decaying animal tissue.

Prime decomposers are bacteria or fungi, though larger scavengers also play an important role in decomposition if the body is accessible to insects, mites and other animals. Additionally, soil animals are considered key regulators of decomposition at local scales but their role at larger scales is unresolved. The most important arthropods that are involved in the process include carrion beetles, mites, the flesh flies (Sarcophagidae) and blowflies (Calliphoridae), such as the green bottle flies seen in the summer. In North America, the most important non-insect animals that are typically involved in the process include mammal and bird scavengers, such as coyotes, dogs, wolves, foxes, rats, crows and vultures. Some of these scavengers also remove and scatter bones, which they ingest at a later time. Aquatic and marine environments have break-down agents that include bacteria, fish, crustaceans, fly larvae and other carrion scavengers.

=== Stages of decomposition ===
Five general stages are typically used to describe the process of decomposition in vertebrate animals: fresh, bloat, active decay, advanced decay, and dry/remains. The general stages of decomposition are coupled with two stages of chemical decomposition: autolysis and putrefaction. These two stages contribute to the chemical process of decomposition, which breaks down the main components of the body. With death the microbiome of the living organism collapses and is followed by the necrobiome that undergoes predictable changes over time.

==== Fresh ====
Among those animals that have a heart, the fresh stage begins immediately after the heart stops beating. From the moment of death, the body begins cooling or warming to match the temperature of the ambient environment, during a stage called algor mortis. Shortly after death, within three to six hours, the muscular tissues become rigid and incapable of relaxing, during a stage called rigor mortis. Since blood is no longer being pumped through the body, gravity causes it to drain to the dependent portions of the body, creating an overall bluish-purple discoloration termed livor mortis or, more commonly, lividity. Depending on the position of the body, these parts would vary. For instance, if the person was flat on their back when they died, the blood would collect in the parts that are touching the ground. If the person was hanging, it would collect in their fingertips, toes and earlobes.

Once the heart stops, the blood can no longer supply oxygen or remove carbon dioxide from the tissues. The resulting decrease in pH and other chemical changes cause cells to lose their structural integrity, bringing about the release of cellular enzymes capable of initiating the breakdown of surrounding cells and tissues. This process is known as autolysis.

Visible changes caused by decomposition are limited during the fresh stage, although autolysis may cause blisters to appear at the surface of the skin.

The small amount of oxygen remaining in the body is quickly depleted by cellular metabolism and aerobic microbes naturally present in respiratory and gastrointestinal tracts, creating an ideal environment for the proliferation of anaerobic organisms. These multiply, consuming the body's carbohydrates, lipids and proteins, to produce a variety of substances including propionic acid, lactic acid, methane, hydrogen sulfide and ammonia. The process of microbial proliferation within a body is referred to as putrefaction and leads to the second stage of decomposition known as bloat.

Blowflies and flesh flies are the first carrion insects to arrive and they seek a suitable oviposition site.

==== Bloat ====
The bloat stage provides the first clear visual sign that microbial proliferation is underway. In this stage, anaerobic metabolism takes place, leading to the accumulation of gases, such as hydrogen sulfide, carbon dioxide, methane and nitrogen. The accumulation of gases within the bodily cavity causes the distention of the abdomen and gives a cadaver its overall bloated appearance. The gases produced also cause natural liquids and liquefying tissues to become frothy. As the pressure of the gases within the body increases, fluids are forced to escape from natural orifices, such as the nose, mouth and anus, and enter the surrounding environment. The buildup of pressure combined with the loss of integrity of the skin may also cause the body to rupture.

Intestinal anaerobic bacteria transform haemoglobin into sulfhemoglobin and other colored pigments. The associated gases which accumulate within the body at this time aid in the transport of sulfhemoglobin throughout the body via the circulatory and lymphatic systems, giving the body an overall marbled appearance.

If insects have access, maggots hatch and begin to feed on the body's tissues. Maggot activity, typically confined to natural orifices, and masses under the skin, causes the skin to slip, and hair to detach from the skin. Maggot feeding, and the accumulation of gases within the body, eventually leads to post-mortem skin ruptures which will then further allow purging of gases and fluids into the surrounding environment. Ruptures in the skin allow oxygen to re-enter the body and provide more surface area for the development of fly larvae and the activity of aerobic microorganisms. The purging of gases and fluids results in the strong distinctive odors associated with decay.

==== Active decay ====
Active decay is characterized by the period of greatest mass loss. This loss occurs as a result of both the voracious feeding of maggots and the purging of decomposition fluids into the surrounding environment. The purged fluids accumulate around the body and create a cadaver decomposition island (CDI). Liquefaction of tissues and disintegration become apparent during this time and strong odors persist. The end of active decay is signaled by the migration of maggots away from the body to pupate.

==== Advanced decay ====
Decomposition is largely inhibited during advanced decay due to the loss of readily available cadaveric material. Insect activity is also reduced during this stage. When the carcass is located on soil, the area surrounding it will show evidence of vegetation death. The CDI surrounding the carcass will display an increase in soil carbon and nutrients such as phosphorus, potassium, calcium and magnesium; changes in pH; and a significant increase in soil nitrogen.

==== Dry/remains ====
As the ecosystem recovers from the disturbance, the CDI moves into the dry/remains stage, which is characterized by a decrease in the intensity of the disturbance and an increase in the amount of plant growth around the affected area. This is a sign that the nutrients and other ecological resources present in the surrounding soil have not yet returned to their normal levels.

During this stage, it is important to monitor the ecosystem for any signs of continued disturbance or ecological stress. The resurgence of plant growth is a positive sign, but it may take several years for the ecosystem to fully recover and return to its pre-disturbance state. All that remains of the cadaver at this stage is dry skin, cartilage, and bones, which will become dry and bleached if exposed to the elements. If all soft tissue is removed from the cadaver, it is referred to as completely skeletonized, but if only portions of the bones are exposed, it is referred to as partially skeletonized.

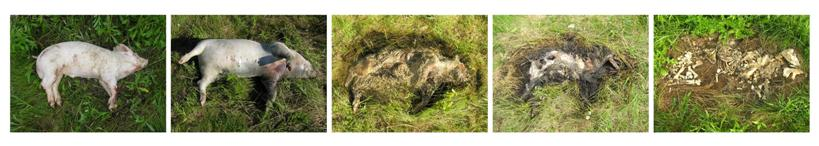
Pig carcass in the different stages of decomposition: fresh, bloat, active decay, advanced decay and dry remains

== Factors affecting decomposition of bodies ==
=== Exposure to the elements ===
A dead body that has been exposed to the open elements, such as water and air, will decompose more quickly and attract much more insect activity than a body that is buried or confined in special protective gear or artifacts. This is due, in part, to the limited number of insects that can penetrate soil and the lower temperatures under the soil.

The rate and manner of decomposition in an animal body are strongly affected by several factors. In roughly descending degrees of importance, they are:

- Temperature;
- The availability of oxygen;
- Prior embalming;
- Cause of death;
- Burial, depth of burial, and soil type;
- Access by scavengers;
- Trauma, including wounds and crushing blows;
- Humidity, or wetness;
- Rainfall;
- Body size and weight;
- Composition;
- Clothing;
- The surface on which the body rests;
- Foods/objects inside the specimen's digestive tract (bacon compared to lettuce).

The speed at which decomposition occurs varies greatly. Factors such as temperature, humidity, and the season of death all determine how fast a fresh body will skeletonize or mummify. A basic guide for the effect of environment on decomposition is given as Casper's Law (or Ratio): if all other factors are equal, then, when there is free access of air a body decomposes twice as fast as if immersed in water and eight times faster than if buried in the earth. Ultimately, the rate of bacterial decomposition acting on the tissue will depend upon the temperature of the surroundings. Colder temperatures decrease the rate of decomposition while warmer temperatures increase it. A dry body will not decompose efficiently. Moisture helps the growth of microorganisms that decompose the organic matter, but too much moisture could lead to anaerobic conditions slowing down the decomposition process.

The most important variable is the body's accessibility to insects, particularly flies. On the surface in tropical areas, invertebrates alone can easily reduce a fully fleshed corpse to clean bones in under two weeks. The skeleton itself is not permanent; acids in soils can reduce it to unrecognizable components. This is one reason given for the lack of human remains found in the wreckage of the Titanic, even in parts of the ship considered inaccessible to scavengers. Freshly skeletonized bone is often called green bone and has a characteristic greasy feel. Under certain conditions (underwater, but also cool, damp soil), bodies may undergo saponification and develop a waxy substance called adipocere, caused by the action of soil chemicals on the body's proteins and fats. The formation of adipocere slows decomposition by inhibiting the bacteria that cause putrefaction.

In extremely dry or cold conditions, the normal process of decomposition is halted—by either lack of moisture or temperature controls on bacterial and enzymatic action—causing the body to be preserved as a mummy. Frozen mummies commonly restart the decomposition process when thawed (see Ötzi the Iceman), whilst heat-desiccated mummies remain so unless exposed to moisture.

The bodies of newborns who never ingested food are an important exception to the normal process of decomposition. They lack the internal microbial flora that produces much of decomposition and quite commonly mummify if kept in even moderately dry conditions.

=== Anaerobic vs aerobic ===
Aerobic decomposition takes place in the presence of oxygen. This is most common to occur in nature. Living organisms that use oxygen to survive feed on the body. Anaerobic decomposition takes place in the absence of oxygen. This could be a place where the body is buried in organic material and oxygen cannot reach it. This process of putrefaction has a bad odor accompanied by it due to the hydrogen sulfide and organic matter containing sulfur.

=== Artificial preservation ===
Embalming is the practice of delaying the decomposition of human and animal remains. Embalming slows decomposition somewhat but does not forestall it indefinitely. Embalmers typically pay great attention to parts of the body seen by mourners, such as the face and hands. The chemicals used in embalming repel most insects and slow down bacterial putrefaction by either killing existing bacteria in or on the body themselves or by fixing cellular proteins, which means that they cannot act as a nutrient source for subsequent bacterial infections. In sufficiently dry environments, an embalmed body may end up mummified and it is not uncommon for bodies to remain preserved to a viewable extent after decades. Notable viewable embalmed bodies include those of:

- Eva Perón of Argentina, whose body was injected with paraffin, was kept perfectly preserved for many years, and still is as far as is known (her body is no longer on public display).
- Vladimir Lenin of the Soviet Union, whose body was kept submerged in a special tank of fluid for decades and is on public display in Lenin's Mausoleum.
  - Other Communist leaders with pronounced cults of personality such as Mao Zedong, Kim Il Sung, Ho Chi Minh, Kim Jong Il and most recently Hugo Chávez have also had their cadavers preserved in the fashion of Lenin's preservation and are now displayed in their respective mausoleums.
- Pope John XXIII, whose preserved body can be viewed in St. Peter's Basilica.
- Padre Pio, whose body was injected with formalin before burial in a dry vault from which he was later removed and placed on public display at the San Giovanni Rotondo.

=== Environmental preservation ===
A body buried in a sufficiently dry environment may be well preserved for decades. This was observed in the case for murdered civil rights activist Medgar Evers, who was found to be almost perfectly preserved over 30 years after his death, permitting an accurate autopsy when the case of his murder was re-opened in the 1990s.

Bodies submerged in a peat bog may become naturally embalmed, arresting decomposition and resulting in a preserved specimen known as a bog body. The generally cool and anoxic conditions in these environments limits the rate of microbial activity, thus limiting the potential for decomposition. The time for an embalmed body to be reduced to a skeleton varies greatly. Even when a body is decomposed, embalming treatment can still be achieved (the arterial system decays more slowly) but would not restore a natural appearance without extensive reconstruction and cosmetic work, and is largely used to control the foul odors due to decomposition.

An animal can be preserved almost perfectly, for millions of years in a resin such as amber.

There are some examples where bodies have been inexplicably preserved (with no human intervention) for decades or centuries and appear almost the same as when they died. In some religious groups, this is known as incorruptibility. It is not known whether or for how long a body can stay free of decay without artificial preservation.

=== Importance to forensic sciences ===
Various sciences study the decomposition of bodies under the general rubric of forensic science because the usual motive for such studies is to determine the time and cause of death for legal purposes:

- Forensic taphonomy specifically studies the processes of decomposition to apply the biological and chemical principles to forensic cases to determine post-mortem interval (PMI), post-burial interval as well as to locate clandestine graves.
- Forensic pathology studies the clues to the cause of death found in the corpse as a medical phenomenon.
- Forensic entomology studies the insects and other vermin found in corpses; the sequence in which they appear, the kinds of insects, and where they are found in their life cycle are clues that can shed light on the time of death, the length of a corpse's exposure, and whether the corpse was moved.
- Forensic anthropology is the medico-legal branch of physical anthropology that studies skeletons and human remains, usually to seek clues as to the identity, age, sex, height and ethnicity of their former owner.

The University of Tennessee Anthropological Research Facility (better known as the Body Farm) in Knoxville, Tennessee, has several bodies laid out in various situations in a fenced-in plot near the medical center. Scientists at the Body Farm study how the human body decays in various circumstances to gain a better understanding of decomposition.

== Plant decomposition ==
A decaying peach over a period of six days. Each frame is approximately 12 hours apart, as the fruit shrivels and becomes covered with mold.

Decomposition of plant matter occurs in many stages. It begins with leaching by water; the most easily lost and soluble carbon compounds are liberated in this process. Another early process is physical breakup or fragmentation of the plant material into smaller pieces, providing greater surface area for colonization and attack by decomposers. In fallen dead parts of plants (plant litter), this process is largely carried out by saprophagous (detritivorous) soil invertebrate fauna, whereas in standing parts of plants, primarily parasitic life-forms such as parasitic plants (e.g. mistletoes), insects (e.g. aphids) and fungi (e.g. polypores) play a major role in breaking down matter, both directly and indirectly via a multitrophic cascading effect.

Following this, the plant detritus (consisting of cellulose, hemicellulose, microbial metabolites, and lignin) undergoes chemical alteration by microbes. Different types of compounds decompose at different rates. This is dependent on their chemical structure. For instance, lignin is a component of wood, which is relatively resistant to decomposition and can in fact only be decomposed by certain fungi, such as the white-rot fungi.

Wood decomposition is a complex process involving fungi which transport nutrients to the nutritionally scarce wood from outside environment. Because of this nutritional enrichment, the fauna of saproxylic insects may develop and, in turn, affect dead wood, contributing to decomposition and nutrient cycling in the forest floor. Lignin is one such remaining product of decomposing plants with a very complex chemical structure, causing the rate of microbial breakdown to slow. Warmth increases the speed of plant decay by roughly the same amount, regardless of the composition of the plant.

In most grassland ecosystems, natural damage from fire, detritivores that feed on decaying matter, termites, grazing mammals, and the physical movement of animals through the grass are the primary agents of breakdown and nutrient cycling, while bacteria and fungi play the main roles in further decomposition.

The chemical aspects of plant decomposition always involve the release of carbon dioxide. In fact, decomposition contributes over 90 percent of carbon dioxide released each year.

== Food decomposition ==
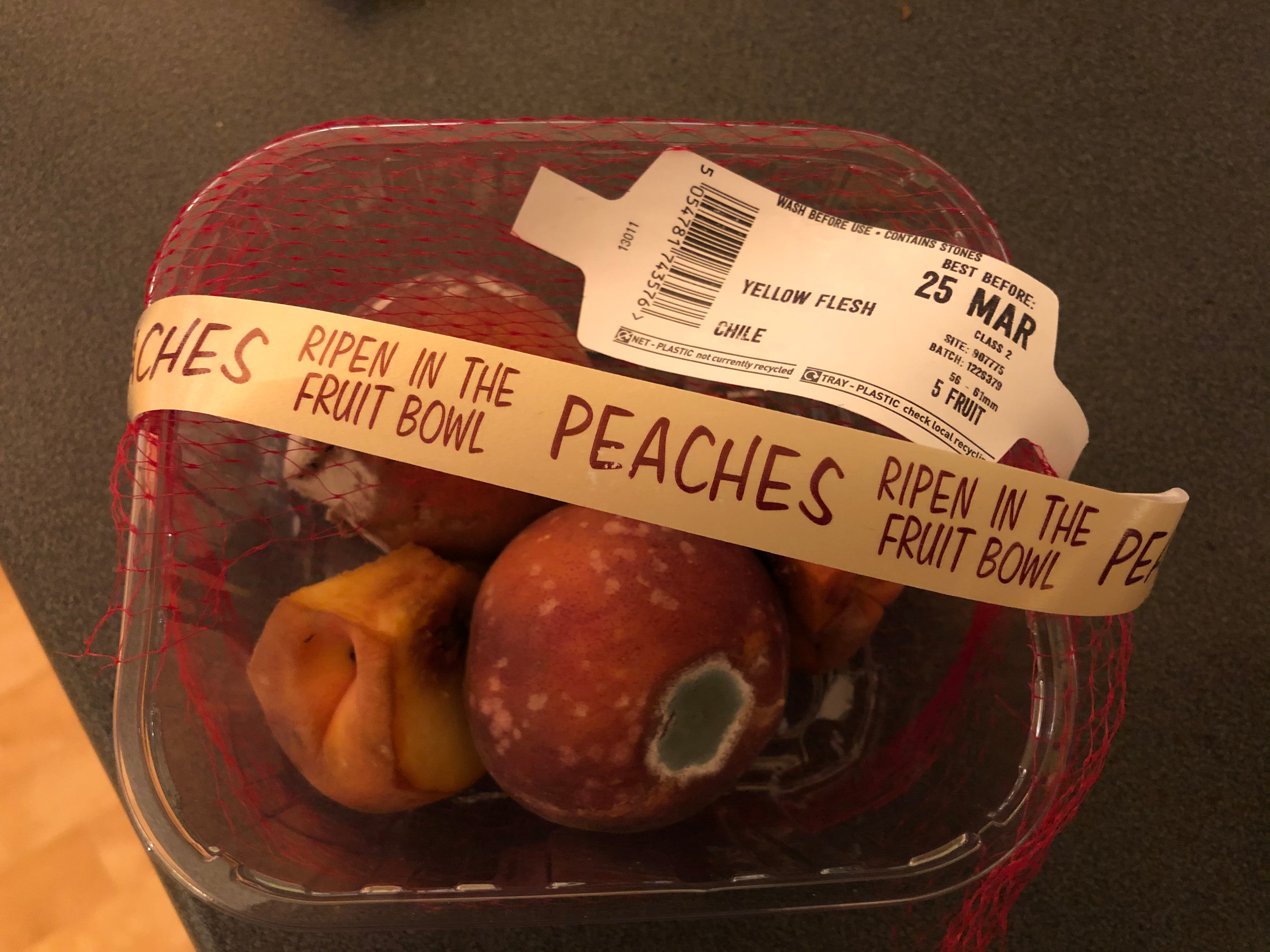
A punnet of rotten peaches

The decomposition of food, either plant or animal, called spoilage in this context, is an important field of study within food science. Food decomposition can be slowed down by conservation. The spoilage of meat occurs, if the meat is untreated, in a matter of hours or days and results in the meat becoming unappetizing, poisonous or infectious. Spoilage is caused by the practically unavoidable infection and subsequent decomposition of meat by bacteria and fungi, which are borne by the animal itself, by the people handling the meat, and by their implements. Meat can be kept edible for a much longer time—though not indefinitely—if proper hygiene is observed during production and processing, and if appropriate food safety, food preservation and food storage procedures are applied.

Spoilage of food is attributed to contamination from microorganisms such as bacteria, molds and yeasts, along with natural decay of the food. These decomposition bacteria reproduce at rapid rates under conditions of moisture and preferred temperatures. When the proper conditions are lacking the bacteria may form spores which lurk until suitable conditions arise to continue reproduction. Decomposition rates and speed may differ or vary due to abiotic factors such as moisture level, temperature, and soil type. They also vary depending on the initial amount of breakdown caused by the prior consumers in the food chain. This means the form that organic matter is in, original plant or animal, partially eaten, or as faecal matter when the detritivore encounters it. The more broken down the matter, the faster the final decomposition.

== Rate of decomposition ==
The rate of decomposition is governed by three sets of factors: the physical environment (temperature, moisture and soil properties), the quantity and quality of the dead material available to decomposers, and the nature of the microbial community itself.

Decomposition rates are low under very wet or very dry conditions. Decomposition rates are highest in damp, moist conditions with adequate levels of oxygen. Wet soils tend to become deficient in oxygen (this is especially true in wetlands), which slows microbial growth. In dry soils, decomposition slows as well, but bacteria continue to grow (albeit at a slower rate) even after soils become too dry to support plant growth. When the rains return and soils become wet, the osmotic gradient between the bacterial cells and the soil water causes the cells to gain water quickly. Under these conditions, many bacterial cells burst, releasing a pulse of nutrients. Decomposition rates also tend to be slower in acidic soils. Soils which are rich in clay minerals tend to have lower decomposition rates, and thus, higher levels of organic matter. The smaller particles of clay result in a larger surface area that can hold water. The higher the water content of a soil, the lower the oxygen content and, consequently, the lower the rate of decomposition. Clay minerals also bind particles of organic material to their surface, making them less accessible to microbes. Soil disturbance like tilling increases decomposition by increasing the amount of oxygen in the soil and by exposing new organic matter to soil microbes.

The quality and quantity of the material available to decomposers is another major factor that influences the rate of decomposition. Substances like sugars and amino acids decompose readily and are considered labile. Cellulose and hemicellulose, which are broken down more slowly, are "moderately labile". Compounds which are more resistant to decay, like lignin or cutin, are considered recalcitrant. Litter with a higher proportion of labile compounds decomposes much more rapidly than does litter with a higher proportion of recalcitrant material. Consequently, dead animals decompose more rapidly than dead leaves, which themselves decompose more rapidly than fallen branches. As organic material in the soil ages, its quality decreases. The more labile compounds decompose quickly, leaving an increasing proportion of recalcitrant material called humus. Microbial cell walls also contain recalcitrant materials like chitin, and these also accumulate as the microbes die, further reducing the quality of older soil organic matter.

== See also ==
- Cadaverine
- Chemical decomposition
- Data degradation
- Dry rot
- Ecosystem
- Humus
- Leachate
- Microbiology of decomposition
- Necrosis
- Peat (turf)
- Putrescine
- Root rot
- Staling

Preceded by Death	Stages of human development Decomposition	Succeeded by Skeletonization
