= Necrobiome =

Community of species associated with decaying corpse remains

The necrobiome has been defined as the community of species associated with decaying remains after the death of an organism. The process of decomposition is complex. Microbes decompose cadavers, but other organisms including fungi, nematodes, insects, and larger scavenger animals also contribute. Once the immune system is no longer active, microbes colonizing the intestines and lungs decompose their respective tissues and then travel throughout the body via the circulatory and lymphatic systems to break down other tissue and bone. During this process, gases are released as a by-product and accumulate, causing bloating. Eventually, the gases seep through the body's wounds and natural openings, providing a way for some microbes to exit from the inside of the cadaver and inhabit the outside. The microbial communities colonizing the internal organs of a cadaver are referred to as the thanatomicrobiome. The region outside of the cadaver that is exposed to the external environment is referred to as the epinecrotic microbial communities of the necrobiome, and is especially important when determining the time and location of death for an individual. Different microbes play specific roles during each stage of the decomposition process. The microbes that colonize the cadaver and the rate of their activity are determined by the cadaver itself and the cadaver's surrounding environmental conditions.

== History ==
There is textual evidence that human cadavers were first studied around the third century BC to gain an understanding of human anatomy. Many of the first human cadaver studies took place in Italy, where the earliest record of determining the cause of death from a human corpse dates back to 1286. However, understanding of the human body progressed slowly, in part because the spread of Christianity and other religious beliefs resulted in human dissection becoming illegal.

Non-human animals only were dissected for anatomical understanding until the 13th century when officials realized human cadavers were necessary for a better understanding of the human body. It was not until 1676 that Antonie van Leeuwenhoek designed a lens that made it possible to visualize microbes, and not until the late 18th century when microbes were considered useful in understanding the body after death.

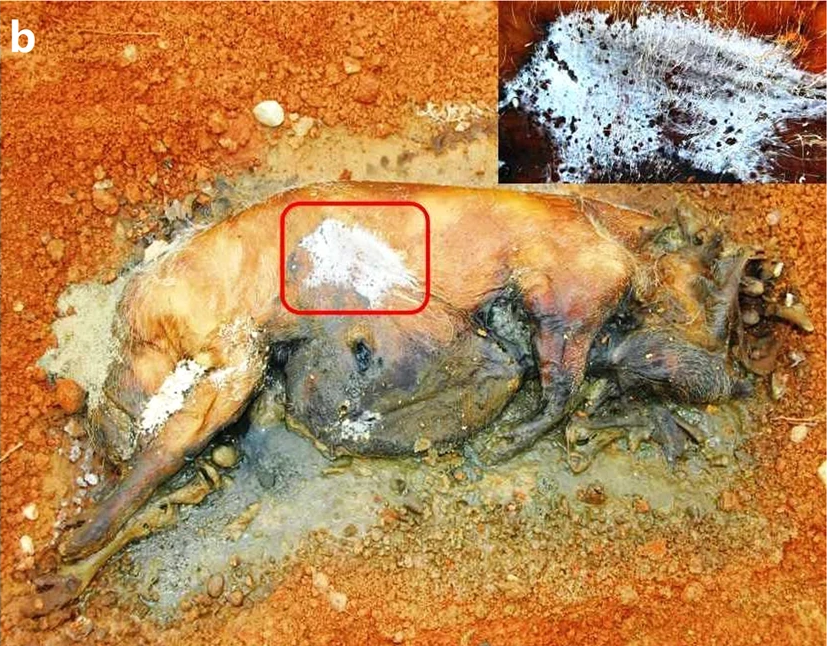
Necrobiome on pig cadaver

In modern times, human cadavers are used for research, but other animal models can provide larger sample sizes and produce more controlled studies. Microbial colonization between humans and some non-human animals is so similar that those models can be used to understand the decomposition process for humans. Swine have been used repeatedly to understand the human decomposition process in terrestrial environments. Pigs are suitable for studying human decomposition because of their size, sparse hairs, and similar bacteria found in their GI tracts. Using nonhuman carcasses as study subjects also offers the benefit of minimizing variation in the sample population.

Sophisticed molecular techniques have made it possible to identify the microbial communities that inhabit and decompose cadavers; however, this research is fairly new. Studying the necrobiome has become increasingly useful in determining the time and cause of death, which is useful in crime scene investigations.

== Applications in forensics ==
=== Microbial forensics ===
As the necrobiome deals with the various communities of bacteria and other organisms that catalyze the decomposition of plants and animals, this particular biome is an increasingly vital part of forensic science. The microbes occupying the space underneath and around a decomposing body are unique to it—similar to how fingerprints are exclusively unique to only one person. Using this differentiation, forensic investigators at a crime scene are able to distinguish between burial sites, as well as gain concrete factual information about how long the body has been there and the predicted area in which the death possibly occurred.

Forensic microbiologists investigate ways to determine time and place of death by analyzing the microbes present on the corpse. The microbial timeline of how a body decays is known as the microbial clock. It estimates how long a body has been in a certain place based on microbes present or missing. The succession of bacterial species populating the body after a period of four days is an indicator of minimum time since death. Recent studies have taken place to determine if bacteria alone can inform the post-mortem interval. Bacteria responsible for decomposing cadavers can be difficult to study because the bacteria found on a cadaver vary and change quickly. Bacteria can be brought to a cadaver by scavengers, air, or water. Other environmental factors like temperature and soil can impact the microbes found on a cadaver.

The time of death can be estimated not only by the type and amount of bacteria on a cadaver, but also by the chemical compounds produced by those bacteria. Forensic anthropologist Arpad Vass determined, from research he undertook in the 1990s, that three types of fatty acids, produced when bacteria break down fat tissues, muscles, and food remnants in the stomach are useful in predicting the time since death during forensic investigations.

=== Forensic entomology ===
Forensic entomology, the study of insects (arthropods) found in decomposing humans, is useful in determining the post-mortem interval after 3–4 days have passed since the death. Various types of flies are usually drawn to a cadaver and typically lay their eggs there. Therefore, both the developmental stages of one species of fly and the succession of different species can give an estimate of how long the person has been deceased. Since the presence and life cycle of insects varies by temperature and environmental conditions, this type of analysis cannot give the actual time of death, but results only in a minimum time since death. The deceased could not have been dead longer than the oldest maggot found.

Insect activity can also indicate the cause of death. Blowflies typically lay their eggs in natural body cavities that are easily assessible, yet also sheltered. If the pattern of maggot activity appears elsewhere, that could indicate an injury, such as a stab wound, even if the surrounding tissue has decomposed. In the event of a death caused by poison, traces of the toxin may have been consumed by the maggots, without harming them.

Since insect species tend to have certain geographic ranges and known habitat preferences, forensic entomologists can determine if a body has been moved after death. Analysis of the insects in the necrobiome can indicate if the death occurred in a different ecological or geographical environment than where the cadaver was found.

== Research ==
=== Human cadavers ===
The decomposition of human bodies is studied at research facilities known as body farms. Seven educational institution house such facilities in the United States: University of Tennessee in Knoxville, Western Carolina University, Texas State University, Sam Houston State University, Southern Illinois University, Colorado Mesa University, and University of South Florida. These facilities study the decomposition of cadavers in all possible manners of decay, including in open or frozen environments, buried underground, or within cars. Through the study of the cadavers, experts examine the microbial timeline and document what is typical in each stage in the various locations that each body is placed.

In 2013, at the Southeast Texas Applied Forensics Science facility at Sam Houston State University, researchers documented the bacteria growing in two decomposing cadavers placed in a natural outdoor environment. Their focus was on the bloat stage, when hydrogen sulfide and methane produced by bacteria build up and inflate the cadaver. They found that "by the end of the bloat period...anaerobic bacteria such as Clostridia had become dominant" and swaps of the oral cavity "showed a shift toward Firmicutes, a group of bacteria that includes Clostridia."

By 2019, Jennifer Pechal, a forensic science researcher at Michigan State University, had worked with microbes on almost 2,000 human remains in a spectrum of conditions. She proposed a pattern in the necrobiome that concurs with data from scientists in Italy, Austria, and France. They found that a "large, consistent shift in the microbial community" occurs about 48 hours after death, making it "fairly easy to tell if a body has been dead for more or less than 2 days." Pechal also hopes that microbial tests can be used in the future to help pathologists determine undiagnosed medical conditions that were the cause of death.

=== Non-human remains ===
A 2019 study at the University of Huddersfield in West Yorkshire, United Kingdom sought to investigate the influence fur has on the necrobiome of rabbits. The experiment involved six dead rabbits purchased from the pet food company, Kiezebrink. The fur was removed from the torsos of three of the test subjects. All six samples were placed on "sterile sand in clean plastic containers." Lids covering the containers prevented birds and other scavengers from accessing the carcasses, while small holes drilled into the sides of the containers allowed air flow and insect activity while the containers were exposed on the roof of a university building. Samples were collected from inside of the mouth, the upper skin of the torso exposed to the air environment, and the bottom skin of the torso in contact with the sand. Proteobacteria were the most abundant present, followed by Firmicutes, Bacteroidetes, and Actinobacteria during the active stage of decomposition. During the advanced stage of decomposition, Proteobacteria decreased from 99.4% to 81.6% in the oral cavity but were most abundant in the non-fur samples. Firmicutes were the most abundant for the skin samples in both fur and non-fur samples. Finally, Proteobacteria was most abundant in the soil interface during the beginning of decomposition in both fur and non-fur samples. The researchers also noted that Actinobacteria was the least abundant in the active stage and decreased even more during the dry stage. The conclusion of the experiment was that while bacterial communities changed over the course of decomposition, the most significant variation is attributed to different anatomical regions "but independently of the presence of the fur."

== Technology and techniques ==
Techniques for analyzing the necrobiome involve phospholipid fatty acid (PLFA) analysis, total soil fatty acid methyl esters, and DNA profiling. This technology is used to simplify the sample collection into sequences that scientists can read. The simplified sequence of the necrobiome is run through a data bank to match the name of it. Due to the lack of universal algorithm technology, there is a knowledge gap in various platforms across different regions of the world. In order to close that gap, there needs to be an expansion of the technology. However, there are a few obstacles, including identifying needs, research, prototype development, acceptance, and adoption.

Researchers are working on an algorithm to predict time since death with an accuracy of within two days, which would be an improvement over time frames given by forensic entomology. Jennifer Pechal states that those computer models must "be tested on bodies with a known time of death to ensure they are accurate." As of 2020, that technology is still 5 to 10 years away from becoming available.

== See also ==
- Microbiology of decomposition
- Biome
- Human microbiome
