= Simple lipid =

A simple lipid is a fatty acid ester of different alcohols and carries no other substance. These lipids belong to a heterogeneous class of predominantly nonpolar compounds, mostly insoluble in water, but soluble in nonpolar organic solvents such as chloroform and benzene.

"Simple lipid" can refer to many different types of lipid depending on the classification system used, but the most basic definitions usually classify simple lipids as those that do not contain acyl groups. The simple lipids are then divided further into glycerides, cholesteryl esters, and waxes. The term was first used by T. P. Hidlich in 1947 to separate "simple" greases and waxes from "mixed" triglycerides found in animal fats.

== See also ==
- Lipid
