= Soap made from human corpses =

Alleged Nazi atrocity

During the 20th century there were various instances of soap being made from human body fat. During World War I, the British press falsely claimed that the Germans operated a corpse factory in which they made glycerine and soap from the bodies of their own soldiers. Both during and after World War II, widely circulated rumors claimed that soap was being mass-produced from the bodies of the victims of Nazi concentration camps which were located in German-occupied Poland. During the Nuremberg trials items were presented as evidence of such production. The Yad Vashem Memorial has stated that the Nazis did not in fact produce soap with fat extracted from Jewish corpses on an industrial scale, but that they may have circulated rumors to this effect in order to frighten inmates.

== History ==
=== 18th century ===
In 1780, the former Holy Innocents' Cemetery in Paris was closed because of overuse. In 1786, the bodies were exhumed and the bones were moved to the Catacombs. Many bodies had incompletely decomposed and had reduced into deposits of fat. During the exhumation, this fat was collected and subsequently turned into candles and soap.

In 1787, the French inspector of manufactures Jean-Marie Roland de la Platière reportedly proposed a scheme to the Academy of Lyons for utilizing the bodies of the dead by converting the fat into lamp-oil and the bones into phosphoric acid.

=== World War I ===
The claim that Germans used the fat from human corpses to make products, including soap, was made during World War I. This allegation appears to have originated as a rumor which was spread by the British and Belgian media. The first recorded reference was made in 1915 when Cynthia Asquith noted in her diary (16 June 1915): "We discussed the rumour that the Germans utilise even their corpses by converting them into glycerine with the by-product of soap." It became a major international story when The Times of London reported in April 1917 that the Germans had admitted rendering the bodies of their dead soldiers for fat to make soap and other products.

After the war John Charteris, the former head of army intelligence, was reported to have claimed in a 1925 speech that he had invented the story. He subsequently insisted that his remarks had been misreported. The controversy led the British Foreign Secretary Sir Austen Chamberlain to officially state that the government accepted that the "corpse factory" story was untrue. The belief that the British had deliberately invented the story was later used by the Nazis.

=== World War II ===
Rumors which alleged that the Nazis produced soap from the bodies of concentration camp inmates were widely circulated during the war. Germany suffered from a shortage of fats during World War II, and the production of soap was put under government control. The "human soap" rumours may have originated because bars of soap were marked with the initials RIF (RIF), which some believed stood for "Rein-jüdisches-Fett" ("pure Jewish fat"). However, in fact, RIF stood for Reichsstelle für industrielle Fettversorgung ("National Center for Industrial Fat Provisioning", the German government agency which was responsible for the wartime production and distribution of soap and washing products). RIF soap was a poor quality substitute for soap and did not contain any fat, human or otherwise.

Rumors about the origin of RIF soap and the meaning of the labeling were also spread in the concentration camps. In his book Solitary in the Overwhelming Turbulence: Five Years as a Prisoner-of-War in East Prussia, Naphtali Karchmer describes his years in captivity as a Jewish-Polish POW. He writes about gray, rectangular, low-quality pieces of soap which he and other POWs received with the letters "RIF" inscribed on a center depression. These were only claimed to be made of "Rein-jüdisches Fett" ("pure Jewish fat") when prisoners complained about the low-foam, smooth soap. A version of the story is included in The Complete Black Book of Russian Jewry, one of the earliest collections of firsthand accounts of the Holocaust, assembled by Soviet writers Ilya Ehrenburg and Vasily Grossman. The specific story is part of a report which is titled "The Extermination of the Jews of Lvov" attributed to I. Herts and Naftali Nakht:

In another section of the Belzec camp was an enormous soap factory. The Germans picked out the fattest Jews, murdered them, and boiled them down for soap. Artur [Izrailevich] Rozenshtraukh—a bank clerk from Lvov, in whose words we relate this testimony—held this "Jewish soap" in his own hands. The Gestapo thugs never denied the existence of a "production process" of this kind. Whenever they wanted to intimidate a Jew, they would say to him, "We'll make soap out of you."

Raul Hilberg reports that such stories were circulated in Lublin as early as October 1942. The Germans were aware that the stories were being circulated, because SS-chief Heinrich Himmler received a letter which described the Poles' belief that Jews were being "boiled into soap", an indication that the Poles feared that they would suffer a similar fate. Because the rumors were circulated so widely, some segments of the Polish population boycotted the purchase of soap. One of the first instances of the claim concerned Oskar Dirlewanger, who was rumoured to have "cut up Jewish women and boiled them with horse fat to make soap".

Historian Joachim Neander, in a German paper which he presented at the 28th conference of the German Studies Association in Washington D.C., cites the following comment, which is contained in a letter Himmler wrote to the head of the Gestapo, Heinrich Müller; the letter is dated 20 November 1942. Himmler wrote the letter to Müller in response to an exposé by Stephen Wise printed in The New York Times that mentioned the soap rumor:

You have guaranteed me that at every site the corpses of these deceased Jews are either burned or buried, and that at no site anything else can happen with the corpses.

Müller was instructed to make inquiries if "abuse" had happened somewhere, and he was also instructed to report the results of his inquiries to Himmler "on an SS oath". Neander goes on to state that the letter represents circumstantial evidence which indicates that it was Nazi policy to abstain from processing corpses due to their known desire to keep their mass murder as secret as possible.

While the soap-making rumor was widely circulated and published as fact in numerous books and newspaper articles after the war, the myth has been debunked for many decades. Historians such as Deborah Lipstadt have frequently stated: "It is a fact that the Nazis never used the bodies of Jews, or for that matter anyone else, for the production of soap […]. The soap rumor was thoroughly investigated after the war and proved to be untrue." Despite this fact, many "believers" of the myth persist, and Neander believes that they are unwittingly playing into the hands of Holocaust deniers by giving them a chance to easily debunk the legend, allowing them to cast doubt upon the veracity of the entire Holocaust as such.

Soap-making rumors were underlying a cycle of Holocaust jokes of the time: "Moishe, why are you using soap with so much fragrance?" - "When they turn me into soap, at least I will smell good" or "Don't eat much: the Germans will have less soap!"

==== Danzig Anatomical Institute ====
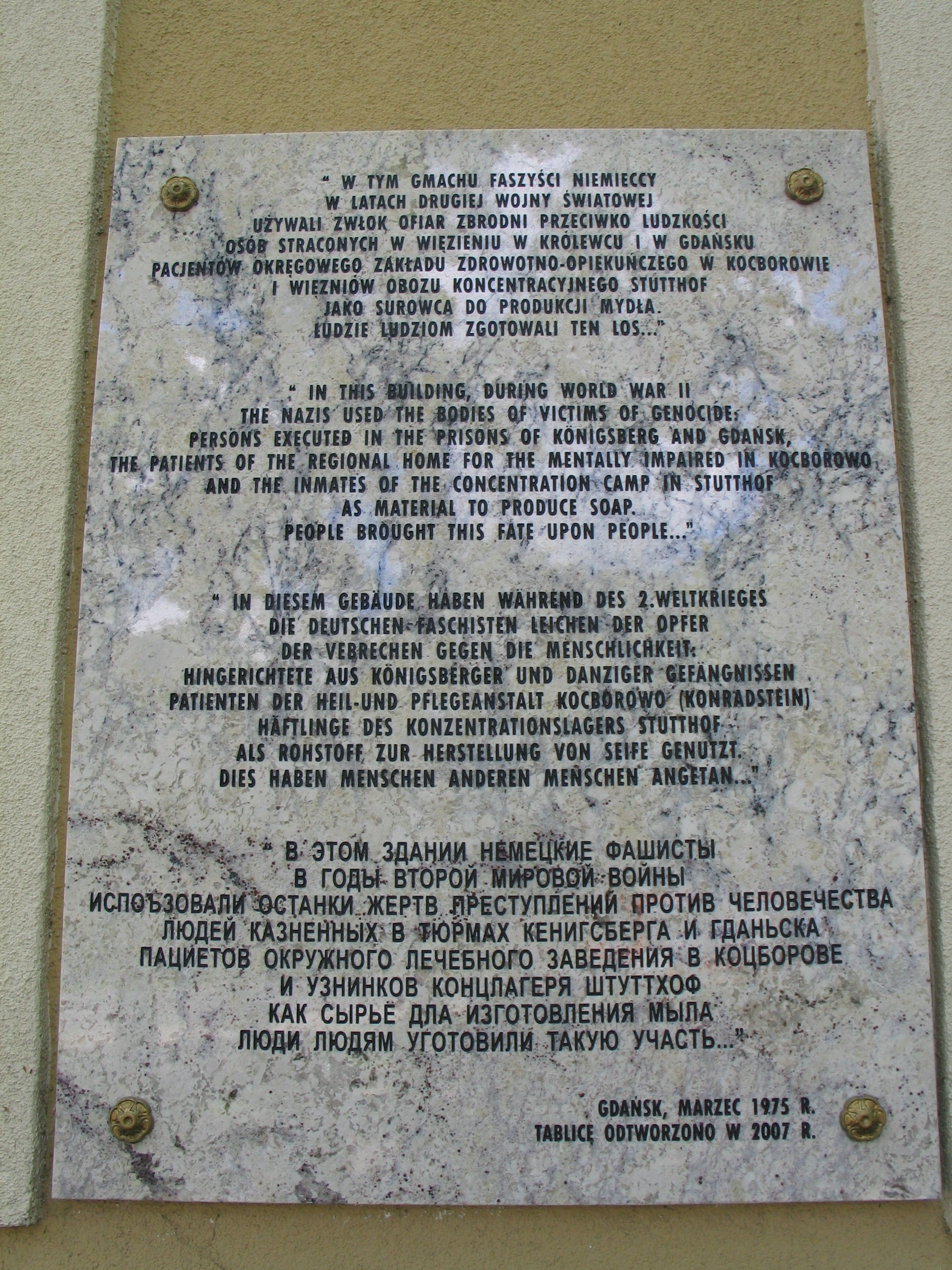
A memorial tablet in Gdańsk, Poland, chronicling Rudolph Spanner's alleged experiments

During the Nuremberg trials, Sigmund Mazur, a laboratory assistant at the Danzig Anatomical Institute, testified that soap had been made from corpse fat at the institute, and he also claimed that 70 to 80 kg (155–175 lb) of fat which was collected from 40 bodies could produce more than 25 kg (55 lb) of soap, and the finished soap was retained by Professor Rudolf Spanner. Two British POWs who had to perform auxiliary tasks at the Institute provided witness-accounts.

In his book Russia at War, 1941–1945, Alexander Werth claims that while visiting Gdańsk/Danzig in 1945 shortly after its conquest by the Red Army, he saw an experimental factory outside the city for making soap from human corpses. According to Werth, it had been run by "a German professor called Spanner" and it "was a nightmarish sight, with its vats full of human heads and torsos pickled in some liquid, and its pails full of a flakey substance—human soap".

Historian Joachim Neander states that the rumors which allege that the Nazis produced soap from the bodies of Jews whom they murdered in their concentration camps, long-since thoroughly debunked, are still widely believed, and they are exploited by Holocaust deniers. However, he goes on to say that even scholars who reject the aforementioned claim that the Germans made soap from human fat and mass-produced it are sometimes still convinced that the Germans attempted "experimental" soap production on a smaller scale in Danzig and this claim is still repeated as if it is a firm fact in several remembrance contexts. He, and the Polish historian Monika Tomkiewicz, who works in the investigative department of the Institute of National Remembrance (IPN) in Gdańsk, and Piotr Semków, formerly also an employee of the IPN, later a lecturer at the Naval Academy in Gdynia, have thoroughly investigated Spanner's claims which surround the Danzig Anatomical Institute and all of them have concluded that the Holocaust-related soap-making claims which surround it are myths, particularly cemented into Polish consciousness by Zofia Nałkowska's 1946 book Medaliony, which was mandatory reading in Poland until 1990, was widely distributed in the Eastern Bloc, and it is still popular today. They all alleged that such secondary sources have played a far greater role in spreading information about the claim than scholarly research has.

According to both Neander, and Tomkiewicz and Semków, "soap", made from human cadavers, came into existence at the Danzig institute, it was not related to the alleged Holocaust-related crimes of "harvesting" Jews or Poles for soap-making purposes, because the connection between "the Holocaust" on one side and the "Danzig soap" on the other side only exists by way of the confirmed false rumors of "concentration camp soap" which were circulated during the war. The idea that the Danzig Anatomical Institute, and Dr. Spanner's work therein, was related to the Holocaust originally stemmed from the findings of bodies and bone maceration processes in the creation of anatomical models in a small brick building on the premise of the anatomical institute. This, and the soapy grease which was created for the purpose of injecting it into the models' flexible joints, was used by the Soviets and the newly established Polish Chief Commission for the Prosecution of Crimes against the Polish Nation as proof of human soap production in Nazi concentration camps. The latter claims had been presented as fact and they had also become a stock phrase in Soviet propaganda, but no evidence of it could be found in the liberated camps. The "human soap" which was made from the bone maceration which was found in Danzig was conflated with the separate rumors regarding the Nazi concentration camps and they were presented together during the Nuremberg trials.

Semków states that the presence of human fat tissue has been confirmed in the samples of soapy grease from Danzig which were presented at the trials (which was claimed to be "unfinished soap") through analysis which was performed by the IPN and Gdańsk University of Technology in 2011 and 2006 respectively, but his and Tomkiewicz research concluded that this was a by-product stemming from Spanner's work in bone maceration. Spanner, a well-respected physician who was nominated for the Nobel Prize in Physiology or Medicine in 1939, would also not have been "experimenting" with soap production (which was widely understood and not something which needed experimentation) instead of teaching his students.

An investigation also maintained that at least 10 kg of soap from human fat was produced, sourced from the Stutthof concentration camp, based on the aforementioned testimonies which were delivered in 1945 and the presence of kaolin in the samples indicated that it was probably used as a cleaning soap due to its abrasive qualities, but the criminal investigation of this claim was discontinued because it lacked grounds which would indicate that Spanner had incited killings in order to obtain corpses for the Institute. Neander points out that the soap-making recipe from Mazur's testimony was contradictory and unrealistic, with a testimony from 12 May 1945 which claimed that 75 kg of fat were produced and 8 kg of soap were produced from the first boiling, a testimony from 28 May 1945 which claimed that 70–80 kg of fat were produced from 40 bodies and 25 kg of soap were produced from both boilings, and a testimony from 7 June 1945 which claimed that 40 bodies produced 40 kg of soap from both boilings. These inconsistencies were even pointed out before the Chief Commission. The witness testimonies of the two British POWs were also noted and they were described as being "contradictory and inconclusive" in a 1990s report which was compiled by the newly established Holocaust Memorial Museum in Washington D.C., which holds a cautious stance with regard to the Danzig Soap issue. Regarding the presence of kaolin, the abrasiveness of which has also been criticized as being unsuitable for flexible model-joints, it was noted by Tomkiewicz and Semków that Spanner had previously done research on kaolin injections into cadavers, meaning that the kaolin found in the soap could have come from the cadaver itself, rather than as later additive.

Tomkiewicz and Semków write that when Zofia Nałkowska, Vice-Chairperson of the Chief Commission, was already writing her short-story "Professor Spanner" (which would be published in Medaliony), Spanner was again working as a medical doctor, under his own name, in Schleswig-Holstein in September 1945, unaware that he was being linked to any possible crimes. He was arrested in May 1947, but was released after three days, later being arrested again, but he was once again released after explaining how he had conducted the maceration and injection process. Spanner would "repeat my statement given at the police and add: At the Danzig Anatomic Institute soap was manufactured to a limited extent from human fat. This soap was only used for the manufacturing of joint preparations". After being dismissed by intervention from the British occupation authorities he was declared "clean" by the denazification program in 1948, officially exonerated, and resumed his academic career, becoming director of the Institute of Anatomy in Cologne in 1957 and editor of the esteemed Werner Spalteholz anatomical atlas, before dying in 1960.

Neander concludes that no research or experiments on soap-making were conducted in Danzig, that Mazur never made soap according to his "recipe", that corpses which were delivered to be boiled and turned into anatomical models were all the corpses of Germans who had not been killed in order to "harvest" their bodies, and that the only soap created was a byproduct of this. He also concludes that what the IPN called the "chemical substance which was essentially soap", obtained by human fat, was used for laboratory cleaning purposes towards the end of the war, with Spanner, as head of the institute, bearing responsibility for this, but that such handling of dead bodies amounted to a misdemeanor as opposed to any criminal behavior, let alone a crime against humanity or involvement in any genocidal activities, something which is today officially acknowledged in Poland. As Holocaust deniers employ this controversy in order to criticize the veracity of the Nazi genocide, Neander states:

The time therefore has come to reduce the "Danzig Soap Case," inflated by postwar propaganda to a prime example of Nazi German crimes, to its real dimensions. "Revisionists" would lose one of their favorite "arguments" in their efforts to discredit serious Holocaust scholarship. Moreover, de-demonizing "Professor Spanner" would dismantle a popular Polish anti-German stereotype and would contribute to a better mutual understanding. The list of the Nazi crimes perpetrated in Poland and during the Holocaust is long enough. It will not become significantly shorter, if an alleged crime is deleted from it, but it will become more trustworthy.

==== Postwar ====
Alain Resnais, who treated the testimony of Holocaust survivors as fact, continued the accusation in his noted 1955 Holocaust documentary film Nuit et brouillard. Some postwar Israelis (in the army, schools) also referred disdainfully to Jewish victims of Nazism who arrived in Israel with the Hebrew word סבון (sabon, "soap"). In fact, this offensive word was not linked to the rumours about Nazi crimes and human soap, but it had the sense of "soft", "weaklings".

Though some still claim that evidence of "human soap" from the Danzig institute as proof, mainstream scholars of the Holocaust consider the idea that the Nazis manufactured soap as part of the Holocaust to be part of World War II folklore. Historian Israel Gutman has stated that "it was never done on a mass scale".

== Legacy ==
A BBC documentary about the death camps which was produced at the end of the war shows bars of "RIF" soap, which were alleged to be made of human fat, and evidence of similar atrocities including shrunken prisoner heads and preserved tattoos, which were put on display in Buchenwald and shown to the population of Weimar after the camp's liberation.

Several burial sites in Israel include graves for "soap made of Jewish victims by the Nazis". These are probably bars of RIF soap. Following a heated discussion about these graves in the media in 2003, Yad Vashem publicized Professor Yehuda Bauer's research which says that RIF soap was not made of human fat, and the RIF myth was probably propagated by the Nazi guards in order to taunt the Jews. Yad Vashem includes an image of an emotional funeral and a burial of "Jewish" soap in Romania.

A small bar of soap was on display at the Nazareth holocaust memorial museum in Israel, and a similar bar of soap was buried in the "holocaust cellar" live-museum in mount Zion in Jerusalem, Israel, during the museum's inception in 1958. A replica was on display there. Following the publication of Yad Vashem Professor Yehuda Bauer's conclusion that soap was not manufactured from the bodies of Jews or other Nazi concentration camp inmates in industrial quantities, Tom Segev, a "new historian" and an anti-establishment Israeli author, wrote in his book "The Seventh Million" that the belief in the existence of the Holocaust-Cellar soap was "idol worshiping in Jerusalem".

A bar of soap is displayed at the National Museum of the History of Ukraine in the Second World War inside the Motherland Monument in Kyiv, Ukraine.

The manufacture of soap from stolen liposuction waste is a major plot point in the 1999 film Fight Club.

In 2004, after Italian prime minister Silvio Berlusconi underwent liposuction, artist Gianni Motti claimed to have bought the fat from the Swiss clinic. He then moulded it a bar of soap, naming it Mani pulite after the early-1990s Italian anti-corruption investigation, and displayed it at the Art Basel fair, where a Swiss private collector bought it for 15,000 euros.

In September 2016, Dutch artist Julian Hetzel, created an art installation called Schuldfabrik using soap made from donated human fat, highlighting human excess and waste. Schuld is a German term that has two different yet related meanings: 'guilt' as a moral duty, and 'debt' as an economical obligation. 'Fabrik' is the German word for 'factory'.

== See also ==
- The Soap Myth
- Anthropodermic bibliopegy (in some cases, skin with tattoos was preserved in Nazi concentration camps)
- Jewish skull collection (Jews who were killed for their skeletons)
- German Corpse Factory, one of the most notorious anti-German atrocity propaganda stories to be circulated during World War I
- Lampshades made from human skin
- Fight Club, a novel (and subsequent film) in which soap is made out of rendered human fat stolen from the dumpsters of liposuction clinics.
- Human fat – Historic pharmaceutical substance of human origin
- Adipocere – Waxy substance formed by anaerobic hydrolysis of fat
- Leonarda Cianciulli, an Italian serial killer known for making soap from the corpses of her victims
