= Adipocere =

Waxy substance formed by anaerobic hydrolysis of fat

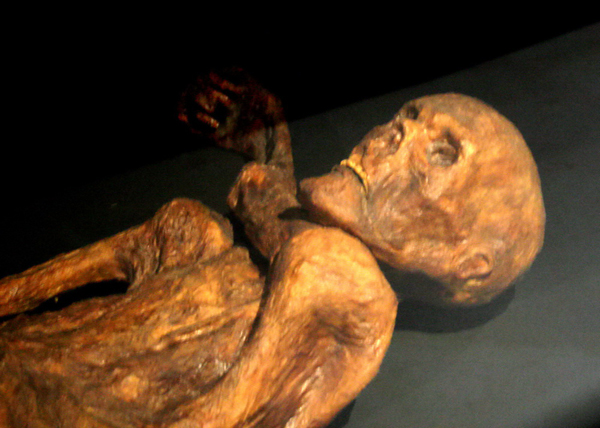
Reconstruction of Ötzi's mummy: the corpse was immersed in water before its mummification, which "dissolved" its epidermis and initiated the process of adipocere formation.

Adipocere (/ˈædɪpəˌsɪər, -poʊ-/), also known as corpse wax, grave wax or mortuary wax, is a wax-like organic substance formed by the anaerobic bacterial hydrolysis of fat in tissue, such as body fat in corpses. In its formation, putrefaction is replaced by a permanent firm cast of fatty tissues, internal organs, and the face.

== History ==
Adipocere was first described by Sir Thomas Browne in his discourse Hydriotaphia, Urn Burial (1658):

In a Hydropicall body ten years buried in a Church-yard, we met with a fat concretion, where the nitre of the Earth, and the salt and lixivious liquor of the body, had coagulated large lumps of fat, into the consistence of the hardest castile-soap: wherof part remaineth with us.

The chemical process of adipocere formation, saponification, came to be understood in the 17th century when microscopes became widely available.

In 1825, physician and lecturer Augustus Granville is believed to have (somewhat unwittingly) made candles from the adipocere of a mummy and used them to light the public lecture he gave to report on the mummy's dissection. Granville apparently thought that the waxy material from which he made the candles had been used to preserve the mummy, rather than its being a product of the saponification of the mummified body.

The body of the "Soap Lady", whose corpse turned into adipocere, is displayed in the Mütter Museum in Philadelphia, Pennsylvania.

Probably the most famous known case of adipocere is that of Scotland's Higgins brothers, murdered by their father in 1911 but whose bodies were not found until 1913. The bodies had been left floating in a flooded quarry, resulting in an almost complete transformation into adipocere. Pathologists Sydney Smith and Professor Littlejohn were able to find more than enough evidence from the preserved remains for police to identify the victims and charge the killer, who was hanged. At the same time, the pathologists secretly took some of the remains back to Edinburgh University for further study; nearly a century later, a relative requested the return of those remains so they could be given a Christian burial. The university agreed to do so if the claimant could prove her relationship to the boys and if other relatives agreed to her plan, and the remains were eventually cremated in 2009.

== Appearance ==
Adipocere is a crumbly, waxy, water-insoluble material consisting mostly of saturated fatty acids. Depending on whether it was formed from white or brown body fat, adipocere is either grayish white or tan in color.

In spite of its etymology, Latin adeps ("fat") and cera ("wax"), it is neither fat nor wax.

In corpses, the firm cast of adipocere allows some estimation of body shape and facial features, and injuries are often well preserved.

== Formation ==
Adipocere is formed by the anaerobic bacterial hydrolysis of fat in tissue. The transformation of fats into adipocere occurs best in an environment that has high levels of moisture and an absence of oxygen, such as in wet ground or mud at the bottom of a lake or a sealed casket, and it can occur with both embalmed and untreated bodies. Adipocere formation begins within a month of death, and, in the absence of air, it can persist for centuries. Adipocerous formation preserved the left hemisphere of the brain of a 13th-century infant such that sulci, gyri, and even Nissl bodies in the motor cortex could be distinguished in the 20th century. An exposed, insect-infested body or a body in a warm environment is unlikely to form deposits of adipocere.

Corpses of women, infants and overweight persons are particularly prone to adipocere transformation because they contain more body fat. In forensic science, the utility of adipocere formation to estimate the postmortem interval is limited because the speed of the process is temperature-dependent. It is accelerated by warmth, but temperature extremes impede it.

The degradation of adipocere continues after exhumation at the microscopic level resulting from the combination of exposure to air, handling, dissection and the enzymatic activity of microbiota.

== See also ==
- Bog body
- Human fat – Historic pharmaceutical substance of human origin
- Putrefaction
- Saponification
- Soap made from human corpses – Alleged Nazi atrocity
