= Hanna Nałkowska =

Polish sculptor (1888–1970)

- Born: Hanna Nałkowska; 18 January 1888; Warsaw, Poland
- Died: 24 September 1970 (aged 82); Warsaw
- Known for: Sculpture

Hanna Nałkowska (1888–1970) was a Polish sculptor. She practised sculpture professionally for 50 years but many of her earlier works were either destroyed during World War II or stolen by the Nazis in Poland.

== Early life and education ==
Nałkowska was born on 18 January 1888 in Warsaw. Her father was Wacław Nałkowski, a renowned journalist and geographer, and her mother was Anna (née Šafránek) Nałkowski, also a geographer as well as a teacher and an author of geography textbooks. Nałkowska's elder sister was the writer Zofia Nałkowska, whose reputation has outlived that of her sister, even though they were equally popular in the interwar years. The sisters were raised in a left-wing environment and from an early age they were surrounded by the intellectual and artistic elite of Warsaw.

Until the age of eleven she was homeschooled by her parents. She later graduated from the Emilia Pankiewiczówna boarding school and then studied sculpture under Teodor Skonieczny at the Museum of Crafts and Applied Arts. She first exhibited a piece of sculpture in 1913 at the Spring Salon of the Zachęta – National Gallery of Art in Warsaw, entitled "Helenka". In 1916, she entered the School of Fine Arts in Warsaw, where she studied painting with professors Edward Trojanowski, Stanisław Lentz, and Karol Tichy, and sculpture with Xawery Dunikowski and Edward Wittig. That same year, she received first prize in the Zachęta competition for her sculpture "The Fighter", with the sculpture later being installed in the lobby of the lower house of the Portuguese parliament. Lost during World War II, a replica was installed in the same lobby in November 2024. In 1924, she married Maksymilian Bick, a high-ranking official in the Polish Tobacco Monopoly.

== The Interwar period ==
Nałkowska was very active during the period between the First and Second World Wars. During the Polish–Soviet War (1919–1921) she studied nursing and then worked as a nurse. Returning to sculpture, she exhibited her works in numerous solo exhibitions, again at the Zachęta Gallery in Warsaw in 1922 and 1931, and in many group exhibitions, including those at the Trade Union of Visual Artists in Warsaw (1927, 1928) and the Institute of Art Propaganda (1935, 1937), as well as at smaller galleries in Warsaw, Poznań, Łódź, Lublin, and Lviv in Poland. She also exhibited at the Zaka Gallery in Paris in 1930, and at the Spring Salon (1930) and the Autumn Salon (1931) in Paris. In 1937, at the Jeu de Paume Museum in Paris she was one of several Polish women to exhibit at an exhibition called Les femmes artistes d'Europe, the first exhibition in France to show only works by women. She also exhibited at the 1939 New York World's Fair.

In 1930–1931, she went to see marble sculpture in Italy and then studied in Paris (under the supervision of Charles Despiau, Marcel Gimond, Joseph Bernard and Astrid Noack). At the 1937 World's Fair in Paris, she was awarded a medal for her sculpture "Ewa" and for a medallion with the likeness of her father. The sculpture “Ewa” is in the collection of the National Museum in Warsaw.

== During and after World War II ==
Nałkowska's husband committed suicide in France in 1941. She then lived with her mother in occupied Warsaw, where Hanna ran a tobacco shop. Her mother died in 1942 and, as the diaries of Nałkowska and her sister show, she was very affected by this. A significant portion of her work in Poland was lost during World War II, including that stolen by the Nazis. Only in Dąbrowa Tarnowska in Poland did a bronze bas-relief survive, on a monument dedicated to those who died in World War I. After the war, Nałkowska and her sister moved to Łódź because of the destruction of Warsaw. Their building was known in Łódź as the "house of writers" because many prominent Polish writers lived there at the time and this is where she started to sculpt again.

In 1947, she worked on the "Monument to the One Hundred Executed", which was intended to commemorate the execution of one hundred Poles in revenge for the murder of a Gestapo officer. The monument was commissioned from the sculptor by the Zgierz city council, but was never completed. In 1953, she returned to Warsaw, where she established a studio in the Old Town. It was here that she created her sister's tombstone (she died in 1954) in 1959. Her bust of her sister is in the Wacław Nałkowski Museum in Wołomin. In a competition organized by the Łódź authorities, she sculpted a bas-relief of "Socialist Woman", ultimately used as a component of the tombstone of Władysława Bytomska, a Łódź activist of the Communist Party of Poland (KPP). She remarried in 1952, to Zygmunt Stefanowicz, who was to die three years later.

Although many of her early works were of women, in later years idealized male portraits were more common. In 1961, Nałkowska did a bust of her father for the auditorium named after him at the Institute of Geography at the University of Warsaw. It remains there. She followed this with a head of the geophysicist, Antoni Bolesław Dobrowolski; a portrait of the philosopher Władysław Tatarkiewicz and the author Jan Brzechwa; several bas-relief portraits in Warsaw cemeteries; a commemorative plaque for Professor Leśniowski at the Infant Jesus Hospital in Warsaw; three religious statues in the Garrison Church in Łódź; and a statue of the Madonna in the church in Bełchatów. Another sculpture called "The Fighter" became part of her father's tombstone. Nałkowska's last solo exhibition was at the Kordegarda Gallery in Warsaw in 1963.

== Death ==
Nałkowska continued to sculpt until the end of her life. She also devoted her time to organising and sharing the legacy of her father and her sister, Zofia, with the publication of her sister's memoirs. She died in Warsaw on 24 September 1970 and shares a grave with her parents at the Powązki Cemetery in Warsaw (plot 219–2–1).
