= The Soap Myth =

Play about Holocaust historiography

The Soap Myth is a play by American playwright Jeff Cohen. It explores the conflict between survivor and historical memory in the context of historian disagreement on whether Nazis made soap out of human remains during the Holocaust. The play follows the relationship between a Holocaust survivor and a young Jewish journalist, dealing with themes of antisemitism and Holocaust denial.

== Overview ==
The Soap Myth follows Milton Saltzman, an elderly Holocaust survivor. He develops a friendship with Annie Blumberg, a young Jewish journalist assigned to write a story about Saltzman's adamance that the Nazi atrocity of soap made from human remains be displayed in Holocaust museums. Annie becomes caught between her sympathy for Saltzman's experiences and the play's Holocaust historians' stance that publication about the production of soap from human remains will be used by Holocaust deniers to discredit the reality of the Holocaust.

Two Holocaust historian characters argue that, despite many eyewitnesses of the experimental soap manufacturing facility at Danzig in 1944, no assertions that soap production took place should be published because no laboratory or production records survived as physical documents. Another character, Brenda Goodsen, represents Holocaust deniers. She demonstrates anti-Semitism through Holocaust denial, delivering a speech which minimized the Holocaust and blamed the Jews for its occurrence.

=== Historical references ===
The Soap Myth is primarily inspired by evidence of the Nazi regime developing a process for the mass-production of soap from the fat of Jews slaughtered in Nazi extermination camps at the Danzig Anatomic Institute in 1944. The play's Nuremberg trials scenes use dialogue from testimonies given by British prisoners of war. The scenes contained Nazi statements regarding the development of an industrial process for producing soap from human bodies, the production of such soap at Stutthof concentration camp, and use of this soap by Nazi personnel. Within these testimonies, the play includes a recipe for the production of the soap:

"5 kilos of human fat are mixed with 10 liters of water and 500 or 1,000 grams of caustic soda. All this is boiled 2 or 3 hours and then cooled. The soap floats to the surface while the water and other sediment remain at the bottom. A bit of salt and soda is added to this mixture. Then fresh water is added and the mixture again boiled 2 or 3 hours. After having cooled, the soap is poured into molds."

Holocaust historian Robert Melvin Spector concluded that the Nazis "did indeed use human fat for the making of soap at Stutthof," albeit in limited quantity.

While The Soap Myth is a work of fiction, it is "inspired by real people and real events as well as an article written by Josh Rolnick in Moment magazine profiling Holocaust survivor Morris Spitzer."

== Production history ==
The play was originally developed in July 2009 in a workshop run at the Dog Run Repertory Company. It was directed by Larissa Lury with a cast including Katia Asche, Victor Barbella, Aaron Costa-Ganis, Louise Flaningam and Joel Friedman. A new, rewritten version ran briefly in the early 2012 off-Broadway at The Roundabout Theater's Harold and Mimi Steinberg Theatre Center. It was directed by Arnold Mittelman with a cast including Greg Mullavey, Andi Potamkin, Dee Pelletier and Donald Corren.

On May 2, 2016, The Soap Myth was presented as a reading at the Bruno Walter Auditorium at the Lincoln Center Library for the Performing Arts. The reading starred 7-time Emmy Award winning actor Ed Asner and 2-time Tony Award nominee Jayne Atkinson alongside Blair Baker and Corren. The reading, produced by Burke-Cohen Entertainment, was the flagship event of Remembrance Readings, a national program in honor of Holocaust Memorial Day by the National Jewish Theater Foundation.

During the week commencing February 21, 2017, "The Soap Myth" had 5 West Coast readings. These were at the Academy and Marin Theater Company, the Shomrei Torah Synagogue in West Hills, Los Angeles, University Synagogue in Irvine and at Center Theatre Group's Kirk Douglas Theatre in Culver City. They were directed by Pam Berlin and had a cast of Asner, Tovah Feldshuh, Baker and Corren.

Under the same cast and direction, The Soap Myth had a brief tour. From January 22 to February 1, 2018, the play was read at the Adrienne Arsht Center for the Performing Arts in Miami Beach, the Adolph and Rose Levis Jewish Community Center in Boca Raton, the Parker Playhouse in Fort Lauderdale, the Zeiterion Theater Performing Arts Center in New Bedford, the Congregation Rodeph Shalom in Philadelphia, The Museum of Jewish Heritage in Battery Park City, and Hofstra University in Hempstead, Long Island.

In January and February 2019, "concert readings" of The Soap Myth were performed in Baltimore, Wilmington, New York City, Tenafly, and Commack with a cast including Asner, Feldshuh, Ned Eisenberg and Liba Vaynberg under directing by Berlin. In April and May 2019, further "concert readings" occurred at Tampa, Sarasota, Wilmington, New York City, Hartford, Milwaukee, Indianapolis, St. Louis, Cleveland, Columbus and Pittsburgh directed by Berlin with the following cast: Asner, Feldshuh (Tampa, Sarasota, Wilmington, Hartford & New York City), Pelletier (Milwaukee, Indianapolis, St. Louis, Cleveland, Columbus & Pittsburgh), Eisenberg (all locations except for Hartford), Corren (Hartford) and Vaynberg.

On July 22, 2019, The Soap Myth was performed at the Williamstown Theatre Festival with Asner, Feldshuh, Vaynberg and Eisenberg. Williamstown Artistic Director Mandy Greenfield wrote about her appreciation and support for the performance.

== Public reception ==
The first version of the play, a workshop production at South Street Seaport in July 2009, received praise from multiple sources. The Villager commented on its compelling nature while NYTheatre.com appreciated its "objectivity", "even-handedness", and "real moral heft". The New York Times described the play as a "pointed investigation of the politics of history" and Time out New York remarked on how the play discusses the subjectivity through which history forms, though criticized the play's dramaturgy.

The play was substantially rewritten and subsequently produced in March 2012, receiving uniformly positive reviews. The New York Times called the revised play "genuinely moving" while the History News Network described it as "an eye-opening history lesson." The Philadelphia Jewish Voice wrote that the play was "theatre of witness at its best - provocative and morally ambiguous."

== Film ==
On April 22, 2019, PBS flagship station WNET filmed a concert reading performance for broadcast on their All Arts channel at the Center for Jewish History in New York. The cast was Asner, Feldshuh, Vaynberg and Eisenberg.

A film, directed by Ron Kopp and Mr. Mittelman, was made of the National Jewish Theater production. It was broadcast nationally through American Public Television on PBS stations across the country. The sponsoring station, WPBT2 in Miami, broadcast the premiere on January 27, 2014. It was the first American film shown on Britain's Digital Theatre website.

Kopp also directed "I Will Refuse to Bubble: History and Theater as Defiance," a documentary about the making of The Soap Myth examining who has the right to write history, highlighting the importance of theater in understanding the world's most incomprehensible events. Featuring Holocaust survivor Irving Roth and scholars Michael Berenbaum, David Marwell and Bonnie Gurewitsch, it is also on the Digital Theatre website.
