= Rudolf Spanner =

Nazi anatomist

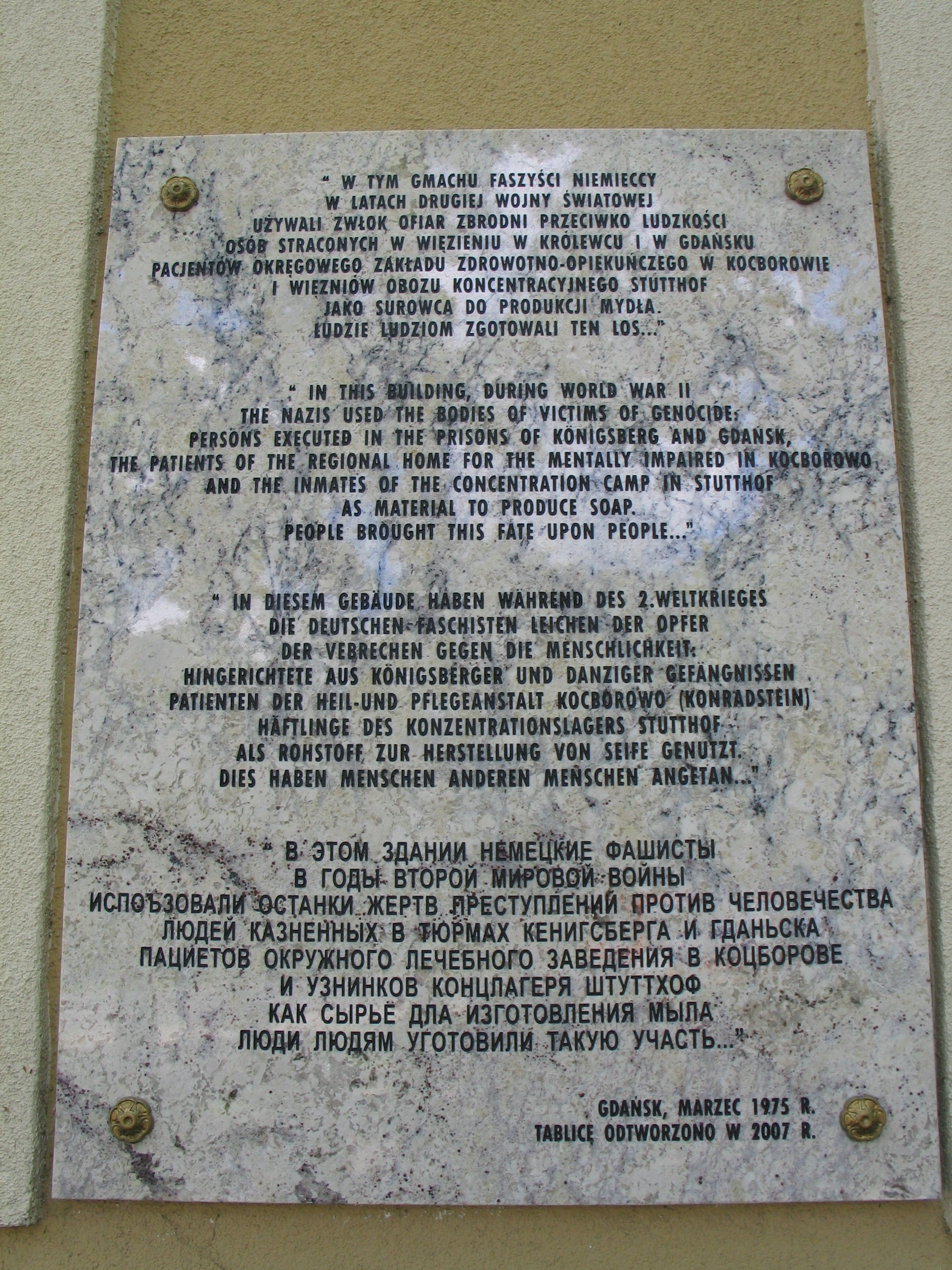
A memorial tablet in Gdańsk, Poland, chronicling Rudolph Spanner's alleged experiments.

Rudolf Spanner (born 17 April 1895 in Metternich bei Koblenz; died 31 August 1960) was Director of the Danzig Anatomical Institute during World War II and Nazi Party member (party membership ID 2733605). During the Second World War, Spanner used human corpses in the creation of anatomical models for the institute, which after a soap-like byproduct from the model-creation process was presented in the Nuremberg trials as soap made from victims of the Holocaust, has led to numerous accusations against Spanner of crimes against humanity.

== Production of human soap ==
Historian Joachim Neander states that the rumors which allege that the Nazis produced soap from the bodies of Jews who they murdered in their concentration camps, long-since thoroughly debunked, are still widely believed, and exploited by Holocaust deniers. He however goes on to say that even scholars who reject the aforementioned claims that the Germans made soap from human fat and mass-produced it are sometimes still convinced that the Germans attempted "experimental" soap production on a smaller scale in Danzig and that this claim is still repeated as if a firm fact in several remembrance contexts. He, and the Polish historians Monika Tomkiewicz, who works in the investigative department of the Institute of National Remembrance (IPN) in Gdańsk, and Piotr Semków, formerly also an employee of the IPN, later a lecturer at the Naval Academy in Gdynia, have thoroughly investigated the claims around the Danzig Anatomical Institute by Spanner and have all concluded the Holocaust-related soap-making claims surrounding it to also be myths, particularly cemented into Polish consciousness by Zofia Nałkowska's 1946 book Medaliony, which was mandatory reading in Poland until 1990, was widely distributed in the Eastern Bloc, and is still popular today. They all alleged that such secondary sources have played a far larger role of spreading information about the claim than scholarly research.

According to both Neander, and Tomkiewicz and Semków, "soap", made from human cadavers, did indeed come into existence at the Danzig institute, but that this was not related to the alleged Holocaust-related crimes of "harvesting" Jews or Poles for soap-making purposes, since the connection between "the Holocaust" on the one side and the "Danzig soap" on the other exists only by way of the confirmed false rumors of "concentration camp soap" which circulated during the war. The idea that the Danzig Anatomical Institute, and Dr. Spanners work therein, was related to the Holocaust originally stemmed from the findings of bodies and bone maceration processes in the creation of anatomical models in a small brick building on the premise of the anatomical institute. This, and the soapy grease created for injection into the models' flexible joints, was used by the Soviets and the newly established Polish Chief Commission for the Prosecution of Crimes against the Polish Nation as proof of human soap production in Nazi concentration camps. The latter claims had been presented as fact and had become a stock phrase in Soviet propaganda, but of which no evidence could be found in the liberated camps. The "human soap" from the bone maceration found in Danzig was conflated with the separate rumors regarding the Nazi concentration camps and were presented together during the Nuremberg trials.

Semków states that the presence of human fat tissue has indeed been confirmed in the samples of the soap from Danzig presented during the trial through surface analysis performed by the IPN and Gdańsk University of Technology and in 2011 and 2006, respectively, but his and Tomkiewicz research concluded but that the soapy grease presented at the trials (claimed to be "unfinished soap") was a by-product stemming from Spanner's work in bone maceration. Spanner, a well-respected physician who was nominated for the Nobel Prize in Physiology or Medicine in 1939, would also not have been "experimenting" with soap production (which was widely understood and not something which needed experimentation) instead of teaching his students.

The IPN also maintained that at least 10 kg of soap from human fat was produced, sourced from the Stutthof concentration camp, based on the aforementioned testimonies delivered in 1945 and the presence of kaolin in the samples indicated its possible use as a cleaning soap due to its abrasive qualities, but discontinued the criminal investigation of this due to lacking grounds to claim that Spanner had incited killings in order to obtain corpses for the institute. Regarding the presence of kaolin, the abrasiveness of which has also been criticized as being unsuitable for flexible model-joints, it was noted by Tomkiewicz and Semków that Spanner had previously done research on kaolin injections into cadavers, meaning that the kaolin found in the soap could have come from the cadaver itself, rather than as later additive. Neander also points out that the 1945 testimonies was contradictory and unrealistic, with a testimony from 12 May 1945 which claimed that 75 kg of fat were produced 8 kg of soap were produced from the first boiling, a testimony from 28 May 1945 which claimed that 70–80 kg of fat were produced from 40 bodies and 25 kg of soap were produced from both boilings, and a testimony from 7 June 1945 which claimed that 40 bodies produced 40 kg of soap from both boilings. These inconsistencies were even pointed out before the Chief Commission. Further testimonies were also noted and described as being "contradictory and inconclusive" in a 1990s report which was compiled by the newly established Holocaust Memorial Museum in Washington D.C., which holds a cautious stance with regard to the Danzig Soap issue.

Tomkiewicz and Semków write that when Zofia Nałkowska, Vice-chairperson of the Chief Commission, was already writing her short-story "Professor Spanner" (which would be published in Medaliony), Spanner was again working as a medical doctor, under his own name, in Schleswig-Holstein in September 1945, unaware that he was being linked to any possible crimes. He was arrested in May 1947, but was released after three days, later being arrested again, but he was once again released after explaining how he had conducted the maceration and injection process. Spanner would "repeat my statement given at the police and add: At the Danzig Anatomic Institute soap was manufactured to a limited extent from human fat. This soap was only used for the manufacturing of joint preparations". After being dismissed by intervention from the British occupation authorities he was declared "clean" by the denazification program in 1948, officially exonerated, and resumed his academic career, becoming director of the Institute of Anatomy in Cologne in 1957 and editor of the esteemed Werner Spalteholz anatomical atlas, before dying in 1960.

Neander concludes that no research or experiments on soap-making were conducted in Danzig, that corpses which were delivered to be boiled and turned into anatomical models were all the corpses of Germans who had not been killed in order to "harvest" their bodies and that the only soap created was a byproduct of this. He also concludes that what the IPN called the "chemical substance which was essentially soap", obtained by human fat, was used for laboratory cleaning purposes towards the end of the war, with Spanner, as head of the institute, bearing responsibility for this, but that such handling of dead bodies amounted to a misdemeanor as opposed to any criminal behavior, let alone a crime against humanity or involvement in any genocidal activities, something which is today officially acknowledged in Poland.
