= Anna Nałkowska =

Polish geographer, teacher and author (1862–1942)

Anna Teresa Nałkowska
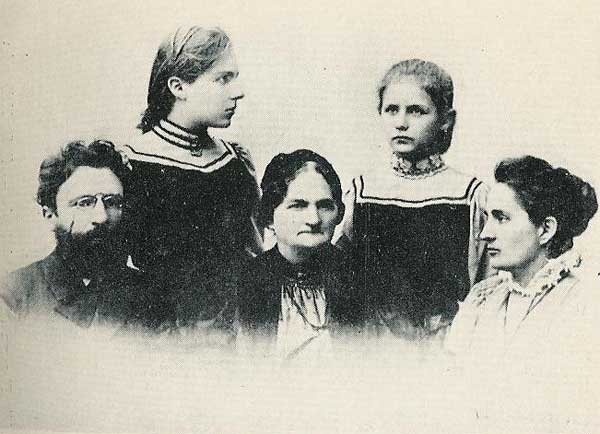
- The Nałkowski family (seated from the left: Wacław, Anna's mother, and Anna; standing: their daughters Zofia and Hanna).
- Born: Anna Šafránková; 29 July 1862; Lviv
- Died: 6 June 1942 (aged 79); Warsaw
- Burial place: Powązki Cemetery
- Occupations: Geographer, teacher and author
- Known for: Geography texts
- Spouse: Wacław Nałkowski
- Children: 2

Anna Teresa Nałkowska (née Šafránková, 1862–1942) was a Polish geographer, teacher and author of geography textbooks.

== Biography ==
Anna Nałkowska was born on 29 July 1862 in Lviv (now Ukraine), daughter of Jan Šafranek, a railway clerk from Slovakia, and Antonina Frank from France.

She married Wacław Nałkowski, a geographer and educator, on 22 September 1881, in the Church of St. Alexander on Three Crosses Square in Warsaw. Nałkowski (1851–1911), whose family belonged to the city's elite, was an educator, geographer, literary critic and author of geography textbooks for schools. The couple had three daughters, two of whom lived to adulthood: writer Zofia Nałkowska and sculptor Hanna Nałkowska.

After graduating from a teachers' seminary in 1886, Anna studied geography at the University of Leipzig in Germany and then returned to Warsaw, where she taught in secondary schools.

According to the diaries of her daughter Hanna, the children were raised in an intellectual environment. "A cult of learning and work reigned supreme. The entire family assisted Wacław Nałkowski in his numerous activities. His wife, Anna, a teacher and author of several textbooks on general geography, served as editor of her husband's works. Both daughters, Zofia and Hanna, wrote under their father's dictation, translated geographical works, and compiled indexes and illustration designs for his works."

=== Writings ===
Anna Nałkowska wrote her best-known textbook, Geography of the Lands of Ancient Poland, for classroom teaching. In it she explored ancient Polish lands and described for each its location and surface area, river networks, lakes, vegetation, animal life and population. The scope of her books included geographical features including mountain ranges, lowlands, uplands and lake districts.

=== Selected distinctions ===
In 1934, she was awarded the Silver Laurel of the Polish Academy of Literature.

Anna Nałkowska died at 79 on 6 June 1942, in Warsaw, and was buried in the Powązki Cemetery.

== Selected memberships ==
- One of the founders of the Polish Geographical Society.
- Participated in the Commission on the Teaching of Geography and the Polish Tourist Society.
- First Polish woman to become a corresponding member of the Society of Women Geographers in Washington, D.C.

== Selected works ==
- Nałkowska, Anna. "Outline of the geography of the Kingdom of Poland with a general glance at the geography of Europe" (1903).
- Nałkowska, Anna. "Beginning knowledge about the Earth: (geography) course 2, part 1: (for direct use by learners)" (1906).
- Nałkowska, Anna. "School geography: (elementary) according to Kirchhoff, Langenbeck, Nałkowski, Pahde, Richter, Schrader, Supan and others. Part 2, Australia, America, Africa and Asia." (1908).
- Nałkowska, Anna. "Geography of Poland." (1920).
