= Jeff Cohen (playwright and theater director) =

American stage director and dramatist

Jeff Cohen is an American theater director, playwright and producer.

== Early life and education ==
Cohen grew up in Baltimore, Maryland, partially in Mt. Washington with his step-father Josh Fendell (a painter and art professor) and with his father Stanley in a house across from Druid Hill Park in the Liberty Heights neighborhood of Baltimore, the setting for his plays Squeakyand Men of Clay.. He graduated from Baltimore Friends School in 1975 before attending New York University where he studied acting with the late Stella Adler.

== Career ==
With his friend Jimmy Burke, Cohen is a partner in the theater, film and television production company Burke Cohen Entertainment, LLC. Among their productions are the upcoming Broadway musical about Patsy Cline, The PBS film of his play The Soap Myth starring Ed Asner in his last great performance and Tovah Feldshuh. BCE also co- produced the film of the Off Broadway production of the play which was the first American production on the British website Digital Theatre.

Highlights of his career include his role as founder and artistic director of four significant Off and Off Off Broadway theater companies - the Dog Run Repertory Theater Company, The Tribeca Playhouse, the Worth Street Theater Company, and The RAPP Arts Center (now the Connelly Theatre) where he produced and directed over fifty productions that have won Drama Desk, Lucille Lortel, Obie and Outer Critics awards.

Cohen plays include The Soap Myth, The Man Who Ate Michael Rockefeller adapted from the short story by Christopher Stokes (Critic's Pick - New York Times, Time Out New York), Men Of Clay (Best New Play 2005 - Baltimore City Paper), and adaptations of Chekhov including The Seagull: The Hamptons, (with various casts including Tammy Grimes, D. B. Sweeney, Neil Huff, Marin Hinkle, and Laura Linney's stage debut in 1990), Uncle Jack (published in Playing With Canons).

Award-winning and notable Cohen productions include Four by Christopher Shinn (Lortel Award), the revival of The Normal Heart (Best Revival, The Public Theater - Drama Desk nomination), The Mystery of Attraction, by Marlene Meyer (Obie Award), The Moonlight Room, (Outer Critics nomination, 2 Lortel nominations), and The Tribeca Playhouse Stage Door Canteen (special 2002 Drama Desk Award).

He has taught at Johns Hopkins University, California Institute of the Arts and Pace University. He received a 2002 Drama Desk Award for The Tribeca Playhouse Stage Door Canteen, his 10-week response to the attacks of 9/11 that brought Broadway, television and music stars to Ground Zero to 'entertain the troops' - the rescue and recovery workers at the World Trade Center site. Performers included Colin Quinn, S. Epatha Merkerson, Mario Cantone, Sandy Duncan, Kate Shindle, Daisy Eagan, Lea DeLaria, Kristin Chenoweth and many others.

== The Soap Myth ==
Cohen's play The Soap Myth is considered one of the most important play about the Holocaust by the foremost Holocaust historians around the world including Michael Berenbaum (founding director of the United States Holocaust Memorial Museum), Dr. William L. Schulman (Director of the Association of Holocaust Organizations) and Kelly Szany (Director of the Illinois Holocaust Museum and Education Center). The role of Holocaust survivor Milton Saltzman has been performed by Ed Asner and Richard Dreyfuss.
