= Alexander Werth =

Russian-born British journalist (1901–1969)

Alexander Werth (4 February 1901 – 5 March 1969) was a Russian-born, naturalized British writer, journalist, and war correspondent.

== Biography ==
Werth was born in St Petersburg. Werth fled with his father and grandfather to the United Kingdom in the wake of the Russian Revolution. He attended classes at the University of Glasgow from 1919 to 1922, taking classes in English, French, History, Russian, Philosophy and Comparative Literature. He became a naturalised British citizen on 7 July 1930.

Werth wrote about France in the prewar period and he also wrote about Russia in World War II, especially the Battle of Stalingrad and the Siege of Leningrad. He was one of the first outsiders to be allowed into Stalingrad after the battle. He spoke and wrote both Russian and English fluently. Werth spent most of World War II in Russia as a BBC correspondent, and had unrivalled access due to the combination of his BBC press credentials and his ability to function as a native Russian speaker. In January 1944, he was part of the delegation of Western correspondents who visited the graves in Katyn forest at the invitation of the Soviets. He believed the Soviet version that the Germans were the perpetrators. He did not agree with the Russian version of Katyn. He was the Moscow correspondent for the Guardian newspaper from 1946 to 1949. His best-known work is Russia at War, 1941 to 1945, (London, 1964) a behind-the-scenes look at life in the wartime Soviet Union. Other works include: France 1940–1955: the de Gaulle Revolution; Moscow 41; The Last Days of Paris: a Journalist's Diary; Leningrad; The Year of Stalingrad; and Musical Uproar in Moscow.

In 1948, Werth left Russia, and did not return until 1961; he travelled much of Russia until he published Russia at War, 1941–1945 in 1964, and spent a few months in Russia each year thereafter until 1968. Werth ended his own life in March 1969, at the age of 68 in Paris.

His son Nicolas Werth is a French historian (Directeur de recherche au CNRS) who specializes in the history of the Soviet Union.

== Majdanek concentration camp ==
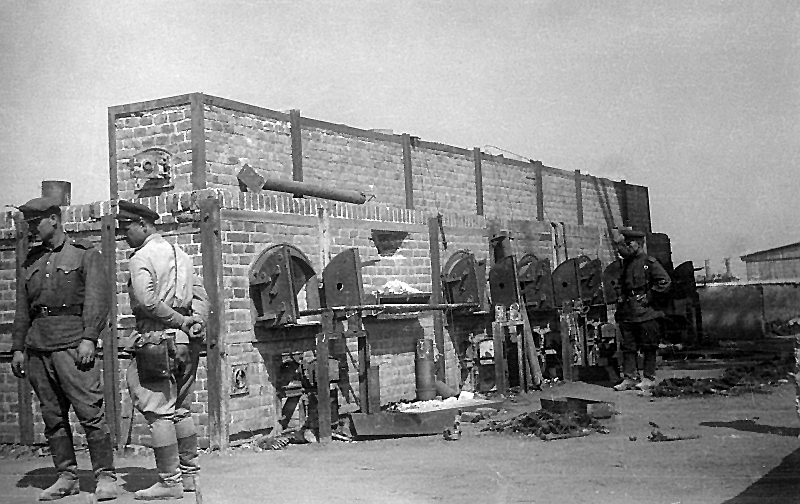
Red Army soldiers examining the ovens at Majdanek, following the camp's liberation, summer 1944

Werth was among a group of journalists who visited Majdanek concentration and extermination camp after it had been discovered by the advancing Red Army. He filed a report on the atrocities that had been committed there, but the BBC initially refused to broadcast it, believing that it was too incredible to be true and suspecting a Soviet propaganda stunt.

== Works ==
- The Diary of Tolstoy's Wife 1860–1891. (authorised translation) London: Victor Gollancz, 1928
- The Countess Tolstoy's Later Diary 1891–1897. (authorised translation) London: Victor Gollancz, 1929
- The Diary of a Communist Undergraduate. (translation of the diary of Nikolai Ognev) London: Victor Gollancz, 1929
- France in Ferment. London: Jerrolds, 1934.
- The Destiny of France. London: Hamish Hamilton, 1937. Published in US as Which Way France.
- France And Munich Before And After The Surrender. London: Hamish Hamilton, 1939.
- The Last Days of Paris: A Journalist's Diary. London: Hamish Hamilton, 1940.
- The Twilight of France, 1933–1940: A Journalist's Chronicle. London: Hamish Hamilton, 1942. Abridged versions of The Destiny of France and of France and Munich, plus the epilogue of The Last Days of Paris. Edited, with an Introduction, by D.W. Brogan.
- Moscow '41. London: Hamish Hamilton, 1942. Published in US as Moscow War Diary.
- Leningrad. London: Hamish Hamilton, 1944.
- The Year of Stalingrad: An Historical Record and a Study of Russian Mentality, Methods and Policies. London: Hamish Hamilton, 1946.
- Musical Uproar in Moscow. London: Turnstile Press, 1949.
- France, 1940–1955. London: Robert Hale, 1956.
- The Strange History of Pierre Mendès France and the Great Conflict over French North Africa. London: Barrie Books, 1957. Published in US as Lost Statesman: The Strange Story of Pierre Mendes-France.
- America in Doubt. London: Robert Hale, 1959.
- The De Gaulle Revolution. London: Robert Hale, 1960.
- The Khrushchev Phase: The Soviet Union Enters the "Decisive" Sixties. London: Robert Hale, 1961. Published in US as Russia Under Khrushchev.
- Russia at War, 1941-1945. London: Barrie & Rockliff, 1964. (German edition: Russland im Krieg 1941–1945. München: Droemer Knaur 1965)
- De Gaulle: A Political Biography. London: Simon & Schuster, 1965. 2nd edition, with additional material: London: Penguin Books, 1967
- Russia: Hopes and Fears. London: Barrie & Rockliff, 1969.
- Russia: The Post-War Years. London: Robert Hale, 1971.
