= Russia at War, 1941–1945 =

Book by Alexander Werth

- Author: Alexander Werth
- Language: English
- Subject: Russia in World War II
- Publisher: Barrie & Rockliff
- Publication date: 1964
- Publication place: United Kingdom
- Pages: xxv+1110 pages
- OCLC: 785129392

Russia at War, 1941–1945 is a 1964 book by British journalist Alexander Werth in which he describes his experiences as a correspondent for the BBC and the Sunday Times in the war time Soviet Union, at the same time attempting to provide a fuller picture of Russia at war.

The reviewers have generally praised Werth for his personal observations, but have been more critical of his research, analysis and use of other sources.

== Similar or related works ==
- Allies at War by Tim Bouverie (2025)
- The Second World War by Antony Beevor (2012).
- Inferno: The World at War, 1939-1945 by Max Hastings (2011).
- The Storm of War by Andrew Roberts (2009).
