= Karol Tichy =

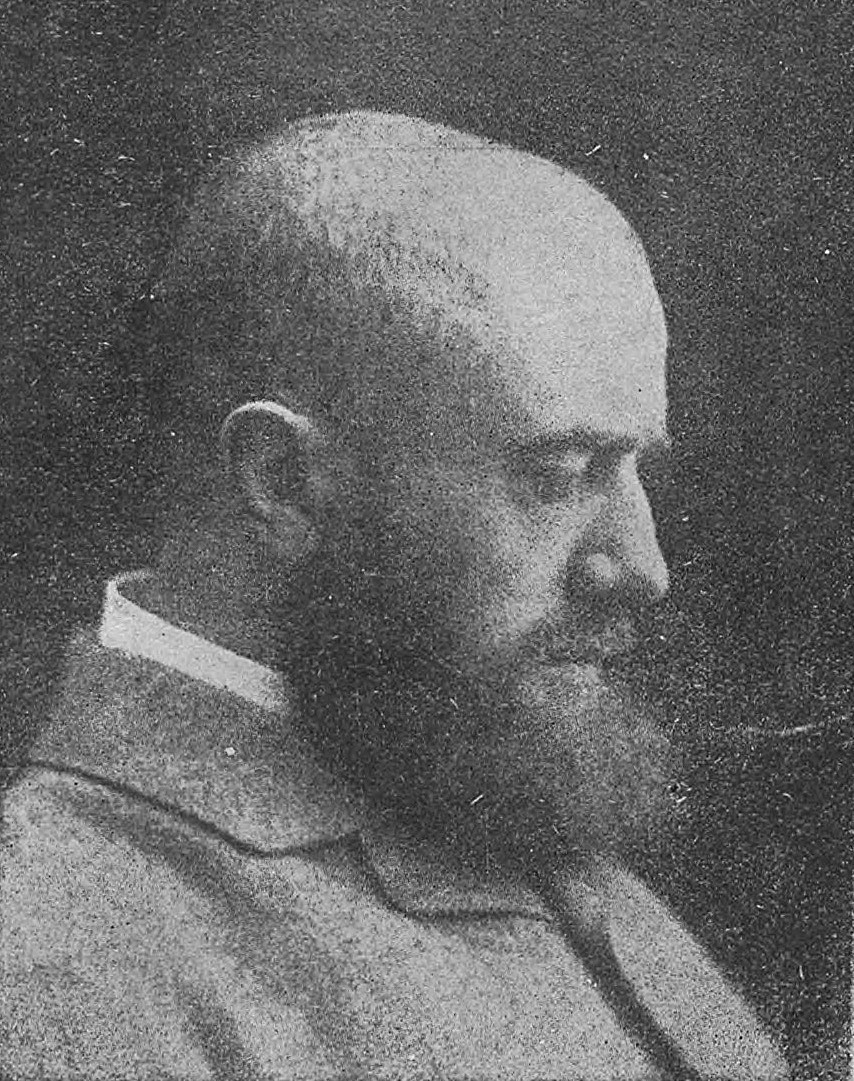
Tichy before 1923

Karol Józef Tichy (2 February 1871 – 26 or 27 November 1939) was a Polish Art Nouveau painter, academic, lecturer and designer.

== Biography ==
He was born in Bursztyn, then in the Austrian Empire and now in Ukraine. After leaving secondary school, he began studying law at the Jagiellonian University (1889–1890) and painting at the School of Fine Arts, both in Kraków. He continued studying art in Munich and at the École des beaux-arts in Paris.

He was mainly involved in applied arts, designing interiors, fabrics, furniture and ceramics (making him one of the pioneers of modern artistic ceramics in Poland). He co-founded the artists' cooperative Ład in 1926 and was a member of the Polska Sztuka Stosowana (Polish Applied Art) (1901–1914).

From 1904 onwards he was a lecturer at the Academy of Fine Arts in Warsaw, where he ran a painting and ceramic studio, and was the academy's director from 1922 to 1923. He died in Warsaw and was buried at Niepołomice.

== Decorations ==
- Order of Polonia Restituta:
  - Officer's Cross, 2 May 1924
  - Commander's Cross, "for merits in the field of development of art", 11 November 1936

== Gallery ==
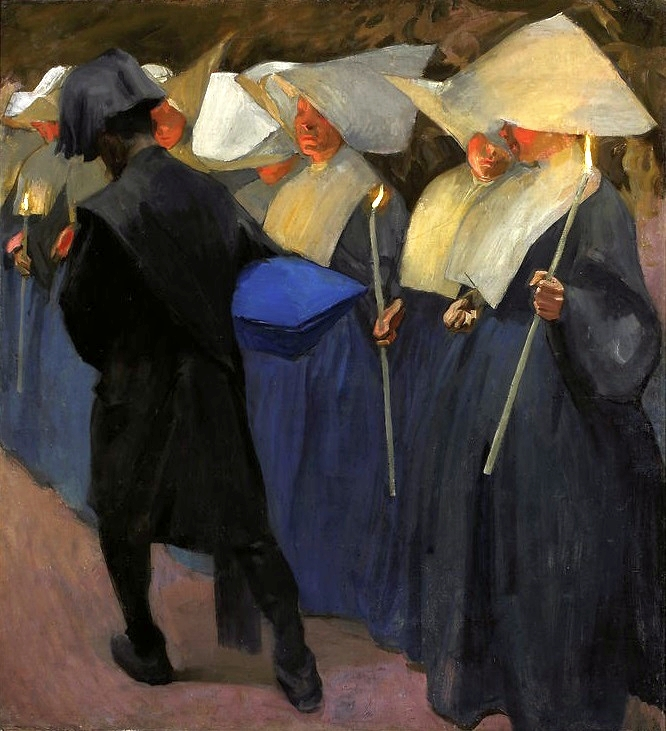
Funeral, oil on canvas, c. 1900

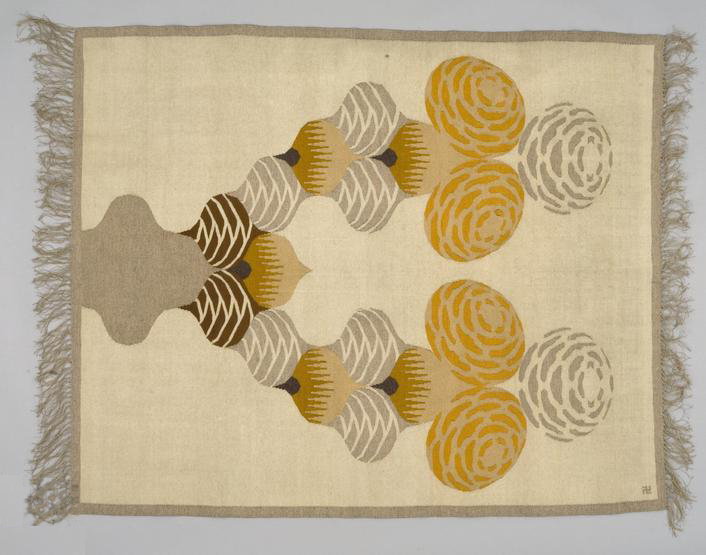
Rug, c. 1900

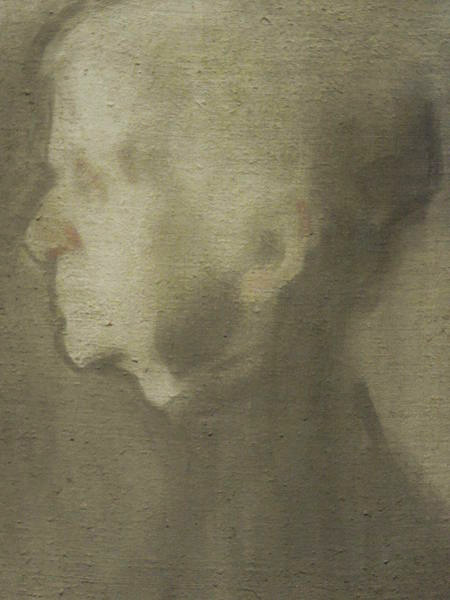
Portrait of the Artist's Mother, c. 1900

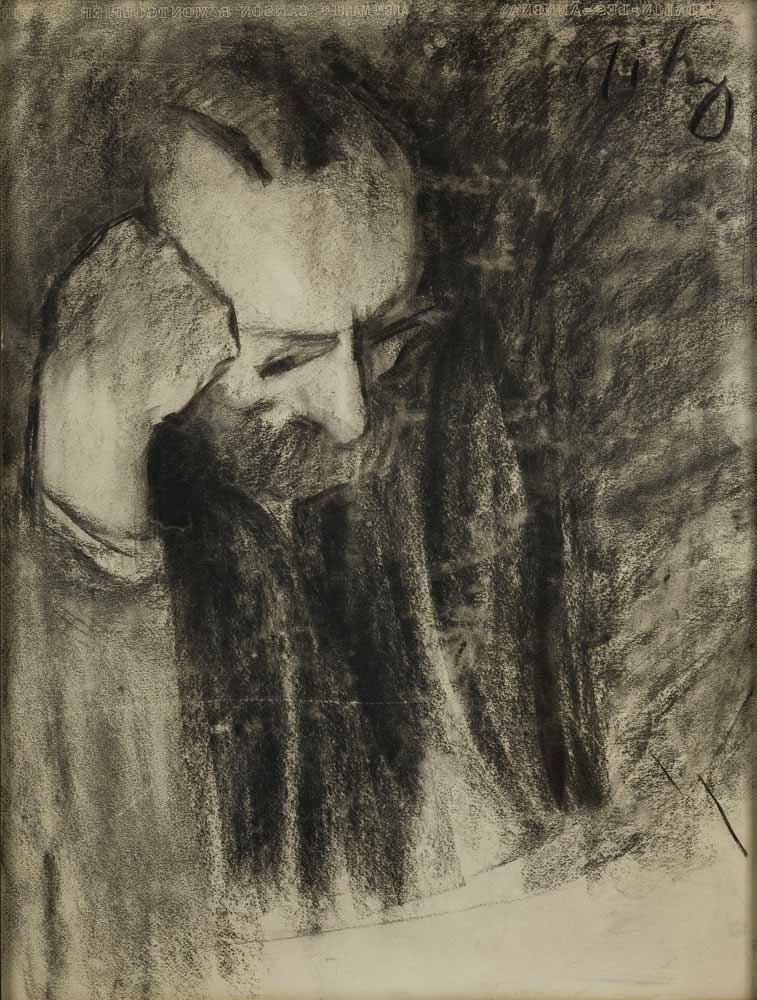
Portrait of Feliks Jasieński, c. 1901

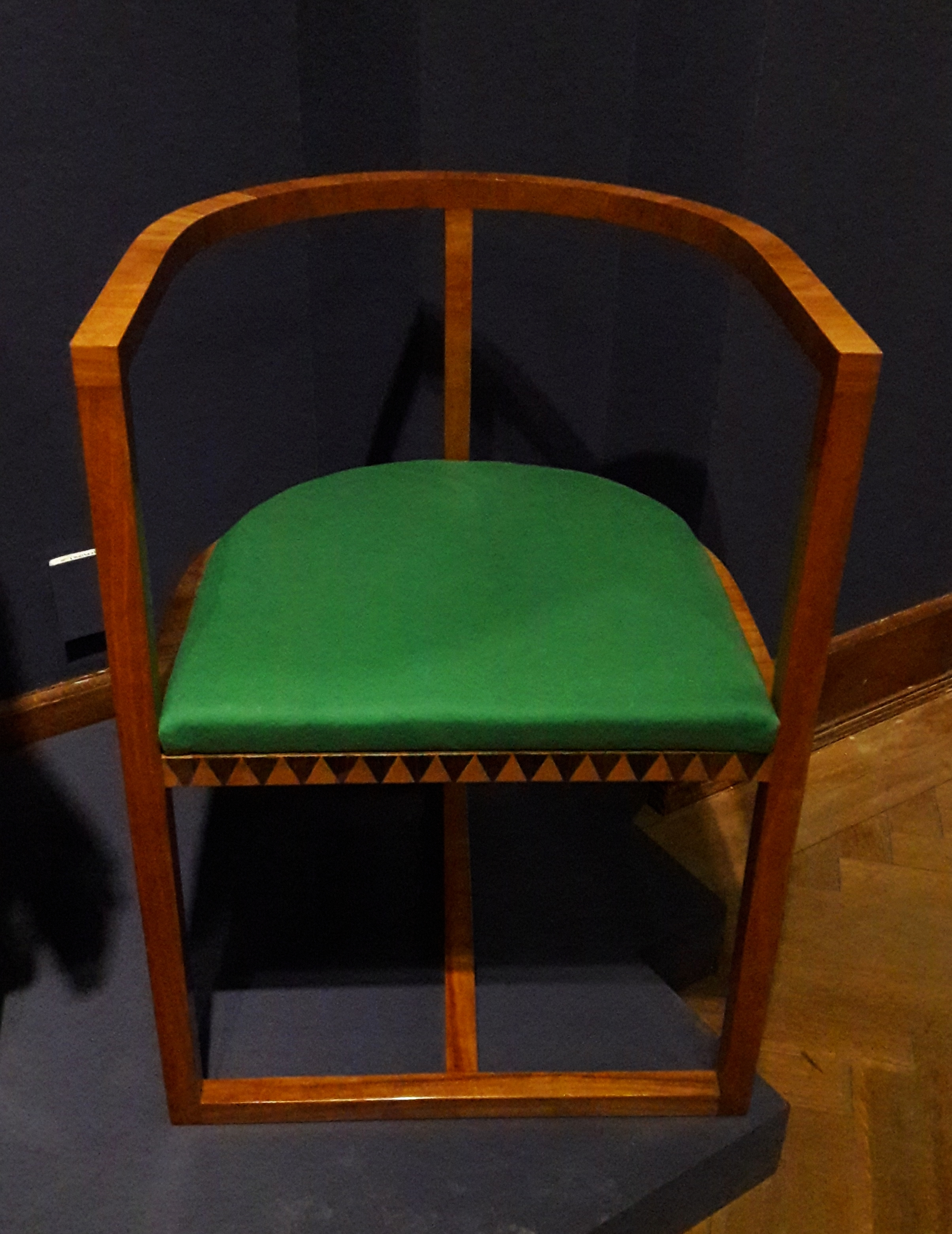
Armchair from a bedroom suite, 1909, National Museum, Warsaw

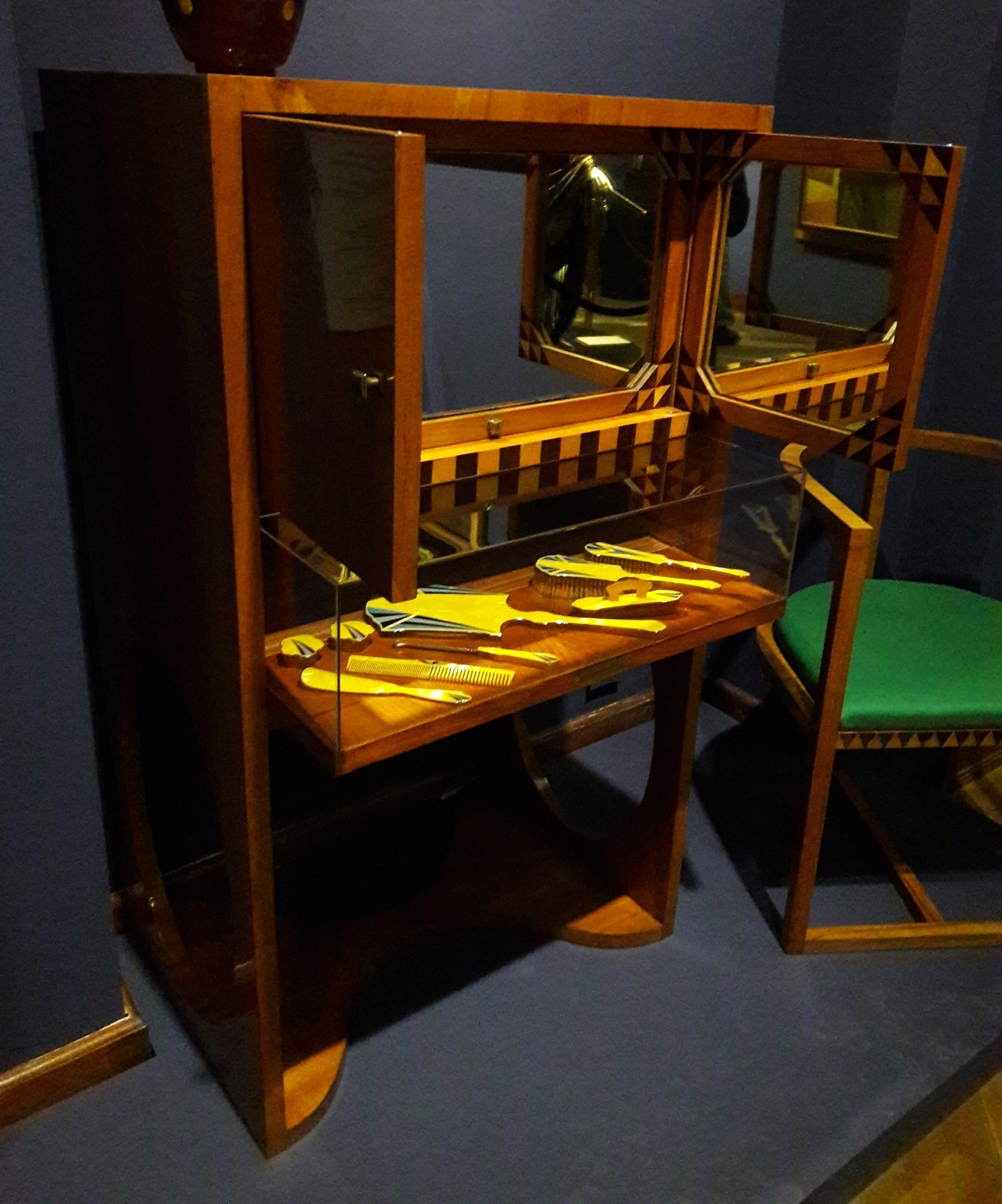
Dressing table from a bedroom suite, 1909, National Museum, Warsaw

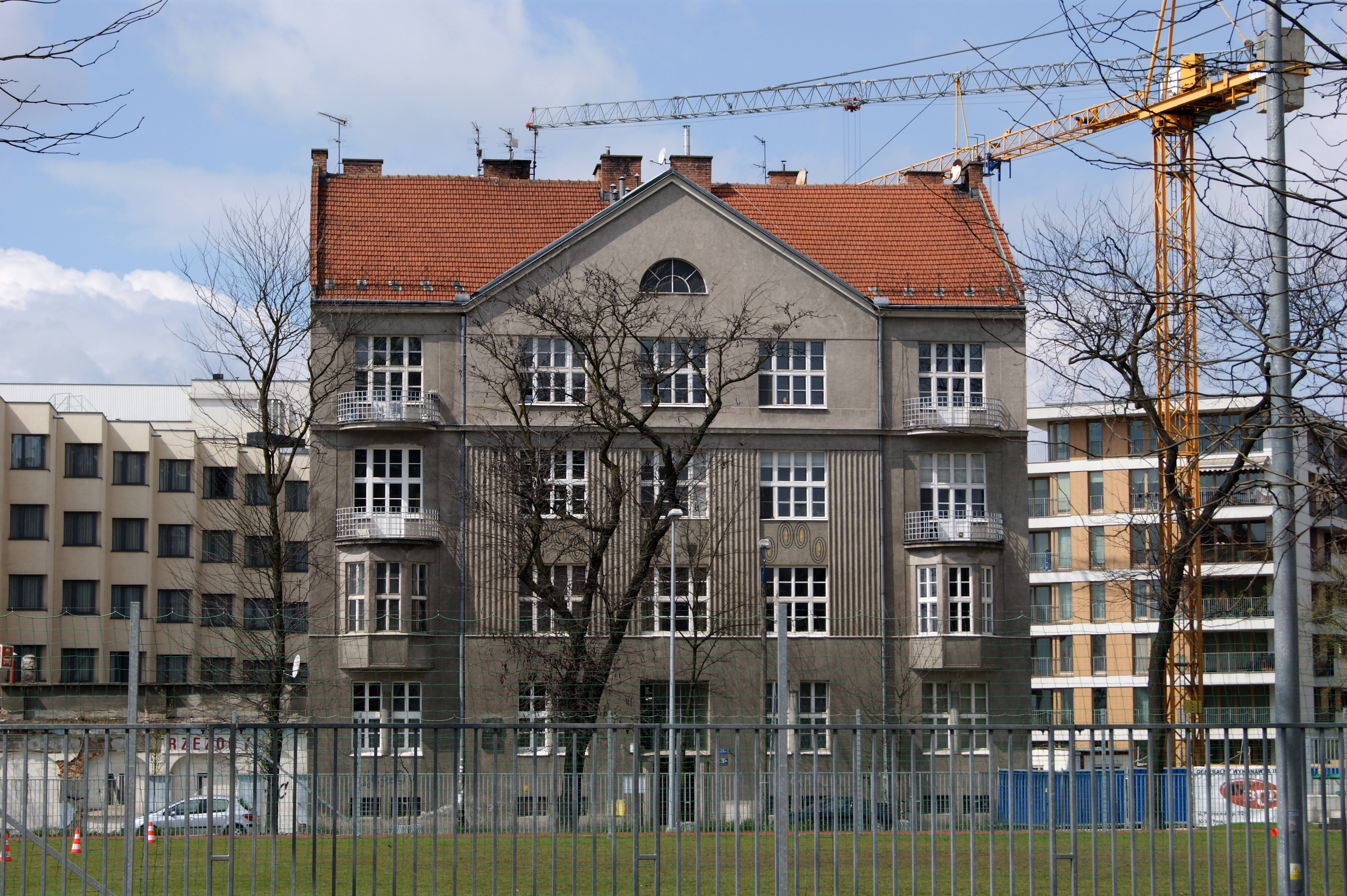
His house in Kraków, designed by him in 1912

== Bibliography ==
- M. Wallis: Secesja. Wydanie II. Wydawnictwo Arkady, Warsaw 1974. (in Polish)
- Wielka Encyklopedia Powszechna PWN, tom 11, p. 524, Warsaw 1968. (in Polish)
