= Augustus Granville =

Italian physician and writer (1783–1872)

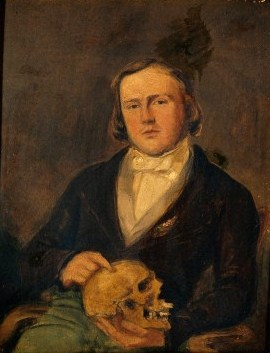
Augustus Granville.

Augustus Bozzi Granville FRS (born Augusto Bozzi, 7 October 1783 – 3 March 1872) was a medical doctor, writer, and Italian patriot.

Born in Milan, he studied medicine before leaving to avoid being enlisted in Napoleon's army. After practicing medicine in the Ottoman Empire, Spain, and Portugal, he joined the British Navy and sailed to the West Indies. There he learned English and married an Englishwoman. He later moved to London, where he practiced as a physician and writer. He is credited with carrying out the first medical autopsy on an Ancient Egyptian mummy which he described to the Royal Society of London in 1825.

== Selected works ==
- [Augusts Bozzi Granville,] Science Without a Head; or, The Royal Society Dissected. By One of the 687 F.R.S.---sss. (London: T. Ridgway, 1830). This 122 page work contributed to the debate over the decline of science in England generated by Charles Babbage. Originally published anonymously, an expanded edition with the author's name appeared in 1836 (Henry Lyons, The Royal Society 1660–1940. Cambridge University Press, 1944, p. 251). Reprinted 1969 by Gregg International Publisher Ltd ISBN 978-0576291569
- A catechism of facts : or, Plain and simple rules respecting the nature, treatment, and prevention of cholera (1832)
- Extracts from a work on counter-irritation, its principles and practice (1839)
- The sumbul : a new Asiatic remedy of great power against nervous disorders, spasms of the stomach cramp, hysterical affections, paralysis of the limbs, and epilepsy (1859)
