= Medallions (book) =

1946 book

- First edition
- Author: Zofia Nałkowska
- Original title: Medaliony
- Translator: Diana Kuprel; Zofia Nałkowska
- Language: English
- Genre: Documentary
- Publisher: Czytelnik
- Publication date: 1946
- Publication place: United States
- English publication date: Feb 1999; Northwestern University Press
- Media type: Print (paperback)
- Pages: 49
- ISBN: 0-8101-1743-6
- OCLC: 42475803
- Dewey Decimal: 940.53/174386 21
- LC Class: PG7158.N34 M3413 2000

Medallions (the original Polish title: Medaliony) is a book consisting of eight short stories by the Polish author Zofia Nałkowska.

The book was originally published in 1946, soon after the end of World War II. In it, Nałkowska calmly related selected stories of Nazi atrocities in Poland and the fates of their victims. Nałkowska was a member of a special committee for the investigation of Nazi crimes that took place in Poland, where she had learned facts directly from victims and witnesses.

Considered a masterpiece of antifascist world literature, Medallions (written in 1945 and first published in 1946) stands as the culmination of Nalkowska's literary style, a style that the Polish writer Witold Gombrowicz once described as "the iron capital of her art and one of the very few exportables in our national literature." More than mere historical record, Medallions offers the reader startling immediacy, the repetition of an event as it persists in the testimonial present, in the scars on the consciousness and conscience of individuals.

— Northwestern University Press,

Part of the text was published in English in the Introduction to Modern Polish Literature edited by Adam Gillon and Ludwik Krzyżanowski. A complete translation by Diana Kuprel was published by the Northwestern University Press in 2000.

The collection includes:

- "Professor Spanner" (original title: "Profesor Spanner")
- "Rock Bottom" (original title: "Dno")
- "The Cemetery Woman" (original title: "Kobieta cmentarna")
- "By the Railway Track" (original title: "Przy torze kolejowym")
- "Dwojra Zielona" (original title: "Dwojra Zielona")
- "The Visa" (original title: "Wiza")
- "Man Is Strong" (original title: "Człowiek jest mocny")
- "Adults and Children in Auschwitz" (original title: "Dorośli i ǳieci w Oświęcimiu")

== See also ==
- Holocaust
- Nazi crimes against ethnic Poles
- Rudolf Spanner
