= Zofia Nałkowska =

Polish prose writer and dramatist (1884–1954)

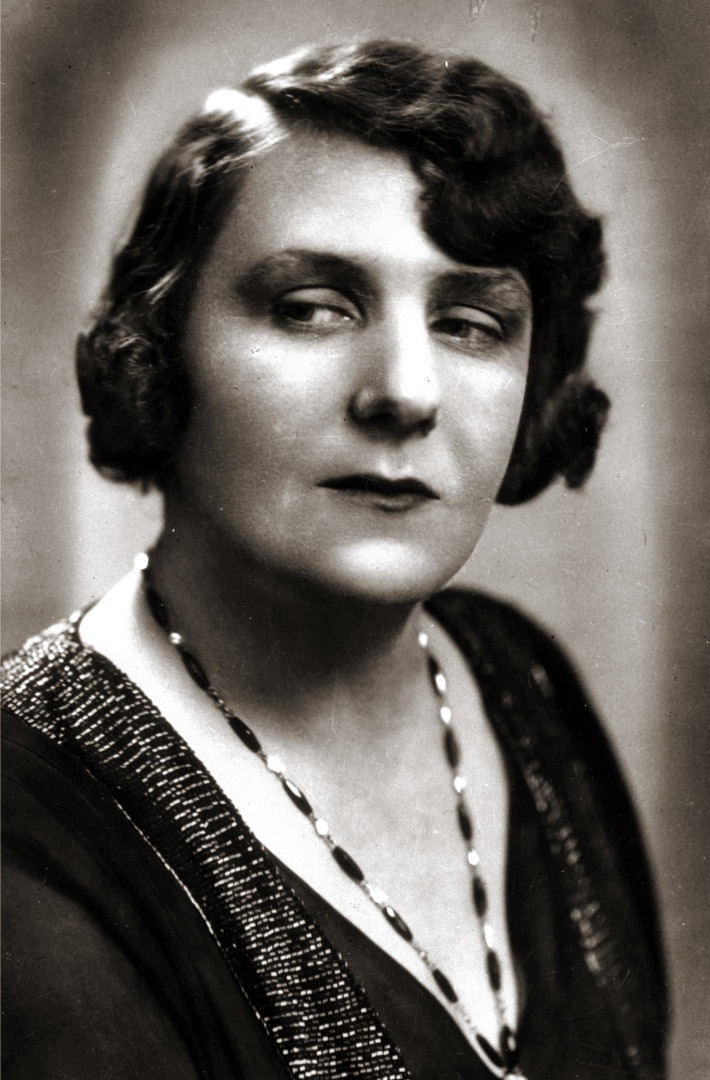
- Born: 10 November 1884; Warsaw, Congress Poland, Russian Empire
- Died: 17 December 1954 (aged 70); Warsaw, Polish People's Republic
- Spouses: Leon Rygier (m. 1904; div. 1918) Jan Jur-Gorzechowski (m. 1922; div. 1929)
- Relatives: Wacław Nałkowski (father)
- Writing career
- Notable works: Granica (Boundary); Medaliony (Medallions)

Signature
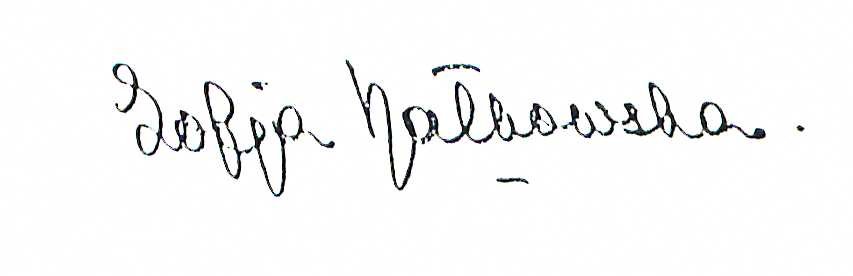

Zofia Nałkowska ([ˈzɔfia nawˈkɔvska], 10 November 1884 – 17 December 1954) was a Polish prose writer, dramatist, prolific essayist and a politician. She was a member of the Polish Writers' Union and served as the executive member of the prestigious Polish Academy of Literature (1933–1939) during the interwar period. Her most well-known works include the novel Granica (1936) and a collection of short stories set during World War II entitled Medallions (1946).

== Biography ==
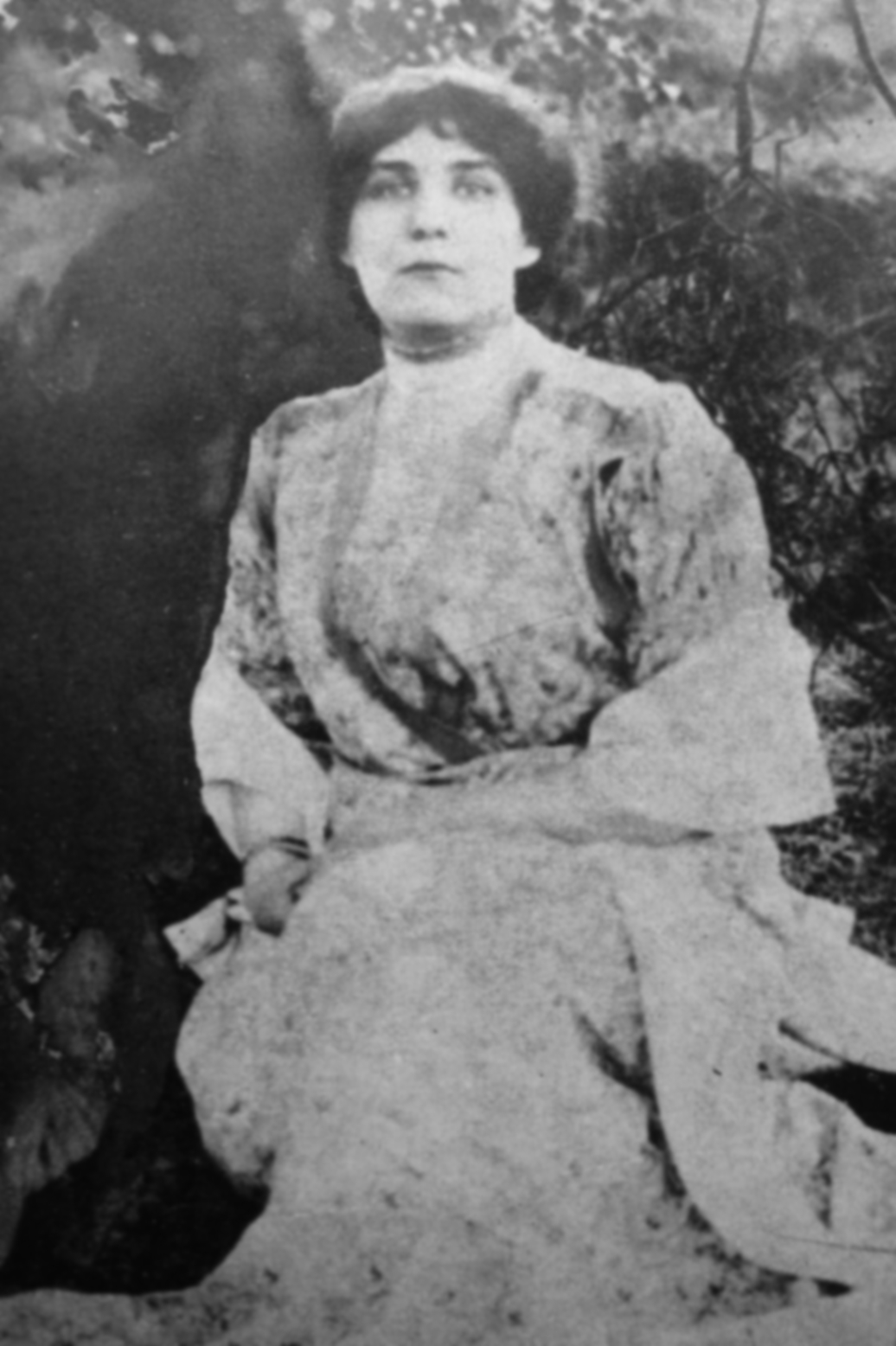
Zofia Nałkowska in her youth

Nałkowska was born into a family of intellectuals dedicated to issues of social justice. She was the sister of the sculptor Hanna Nałkowska and her parents were Anna Nałkowska and Wacław Nałkowski.

Zofia studied at the clandestine Flying University under the Russian partition. Upon Poland's return to independence and the establishment of the Second Polish Republic she became one of the country's most distinguished feminist writers of novels, novellas and stage-plays characterized by socio-realism and psychological depth.

From 1928, she was vice-president of the Polish PEN Club. In the 1930s, she took an active part in speeches against the Sanation regime. She was one of the organizers of protests against political persecution in Poland. From 1933, she has been a member of the Polish Academy of Literature.

During the German occupation, she was engaged in underground literary activities and after participated in the work of the International Commission for the Investigation of Hitler's Crimes in Poland. A supporter of the new communist authorities in Poland, Nałkowska became a deputy of the State National Council and later a deputy of the National Assembly of the Polish People's Republic.

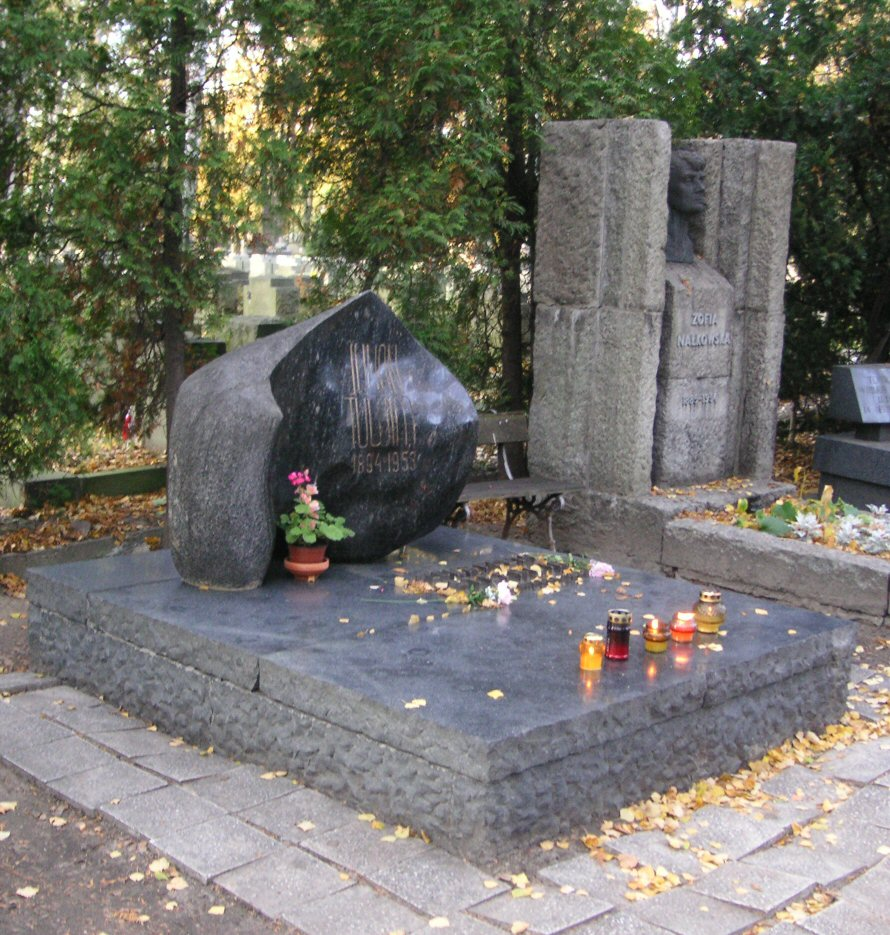
Graves of Julian Tuwim (left) and Zofia Nałkowska (right) adorned with dark bronze bust, in Powązki Cemetery, Warsaw

Nałkowska died of a cerebral hemorrhage and was buried at the Powązki Military Cemetery with full state honours.

== Literary output ==
Nałkowska's first literary success was the Romans Teresy Hennert (The Romance of Teresa Hennert, 1923) followed by a slew of popular novels. She is best known for her books Granica (Boundary, 1935), the Węzły życia (Bonds of Life, 1948) and Medaliony (Medallions, 1947).

In her writing, Nałkowska boldly tackled difficult and controversial subjects, professing in her 1932 article "Organizacja erotyzmu" (Structure of Eroticism) published in the Wiadomości Literackie magazine – the premier literary periodical in Poland at the time – that:

...a rational, nay, intellectual approach to eroticism must be encouraged and strengthened, to allow for a consideration of eroticism in conjunction with other aspects of the life of the human community. Eroticism is not a private matter of the individual. It has its ramifications within all domains of human life and it is not possible to separate it from them by way of contemptuous disparagement in the name of morality, discretion, or yet by a demotion on the hierarchy of subjects worthy of intellectual attention: it cannot be isolated by prudery or relegated to science for its purely biological dimension."

== Tribute ==
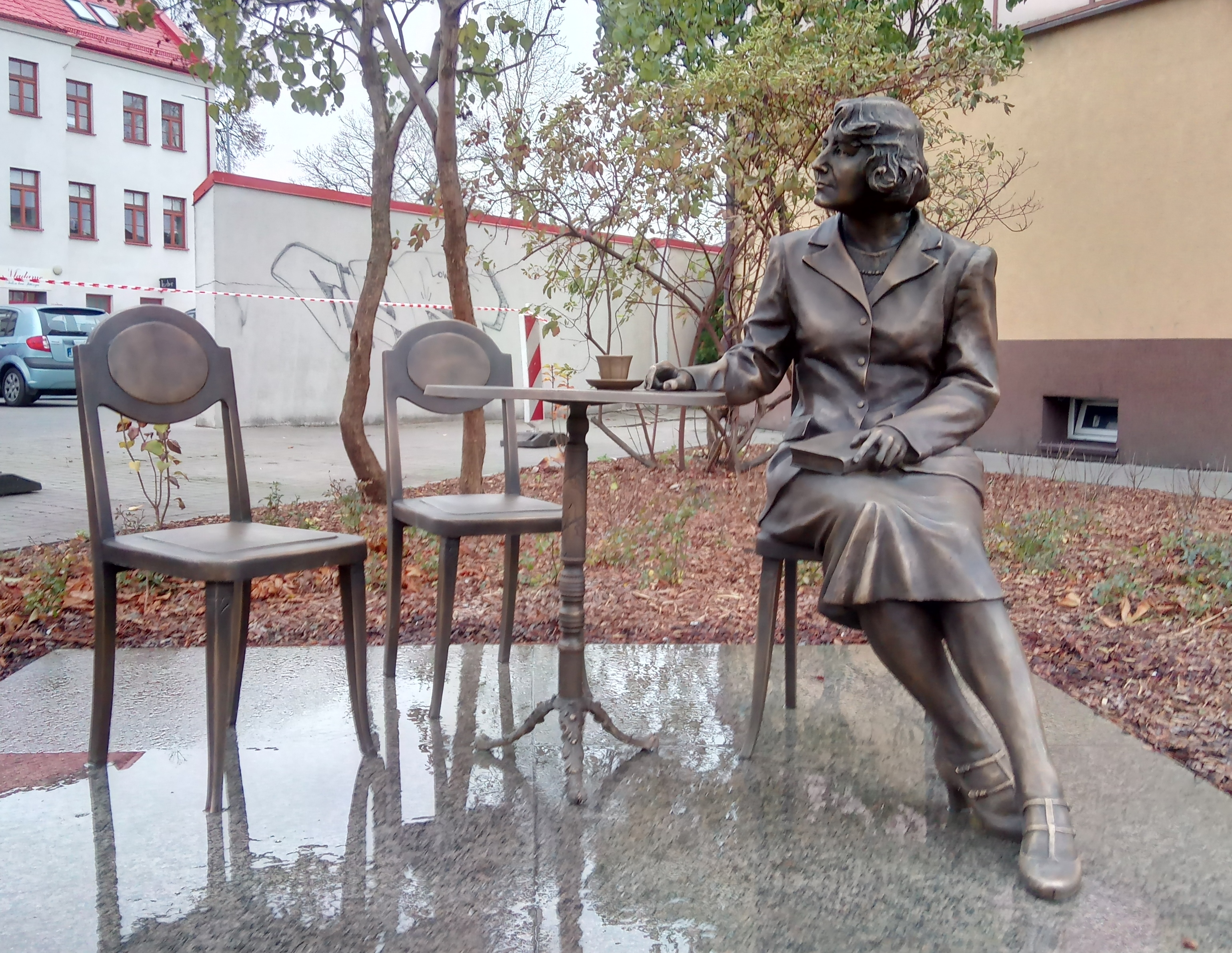
Monument to Zofia Nałkowska in Wołomin

On 10 November 2014 Google celebrated her 130th birthday with a Google Doodle.

From May 2024, a manuscript Nałkowska's Diary is presented at a permanent exhibition in the Palace of the Commonwealth in Warsaw.

== Works ==
=== Novels ===
- Kobiety (Women, 1906), translated by Michael Henry Dziewicki, 1920
- Książę (The Prince, 1907)
- Rówieśnice (Contemporaries, 1909)
- Narcyza (1911)
- Noc podniebna (Heavenly night, novella, 1911)
- Węże i róże (Snakes and roses, 1914)
- Hrabia Emil (Count Emil, 1920)
- Na torfowiskach (At the bogs, 1922)
- Romans Teresy Hennert (The Romance of Teresa Hennert, 1923), translated by Megan Thomas and Ewa Malachowska-Pasek, 2014
- Dom nad łąkami (House upon the meadows, autobiography, 1925)
- Choucas (1927), translated by Ursula Phillips, 2014 (winner of the Found in Translation Award 2015)
- Niedobra miłość (Bad love, 1928)
- Granica (Boundary, 1935), translated by Ursula Phillips, 2016
- Niecierpliwi (Anxious,1938)
- Węzły życia (Living ties, 1948)
- Mój ojciec (My father, 1953)

=== Short stories ===
- Medaliony (Medallions, 1946), a collection of 8 short stories about German World War II atrocities in occupied Poland, translated by Diana Kuprel, 2000

=== Stage plays ===
- Dom kobiet (1930)
- Dzień jego powrotu (1931) (The Day of his Return, translated by Marja Slomczanka, performed 1931)
- Renata Słuczańska (1935)

== See also ==
- Feminism in Poland
- List of feminist literature
