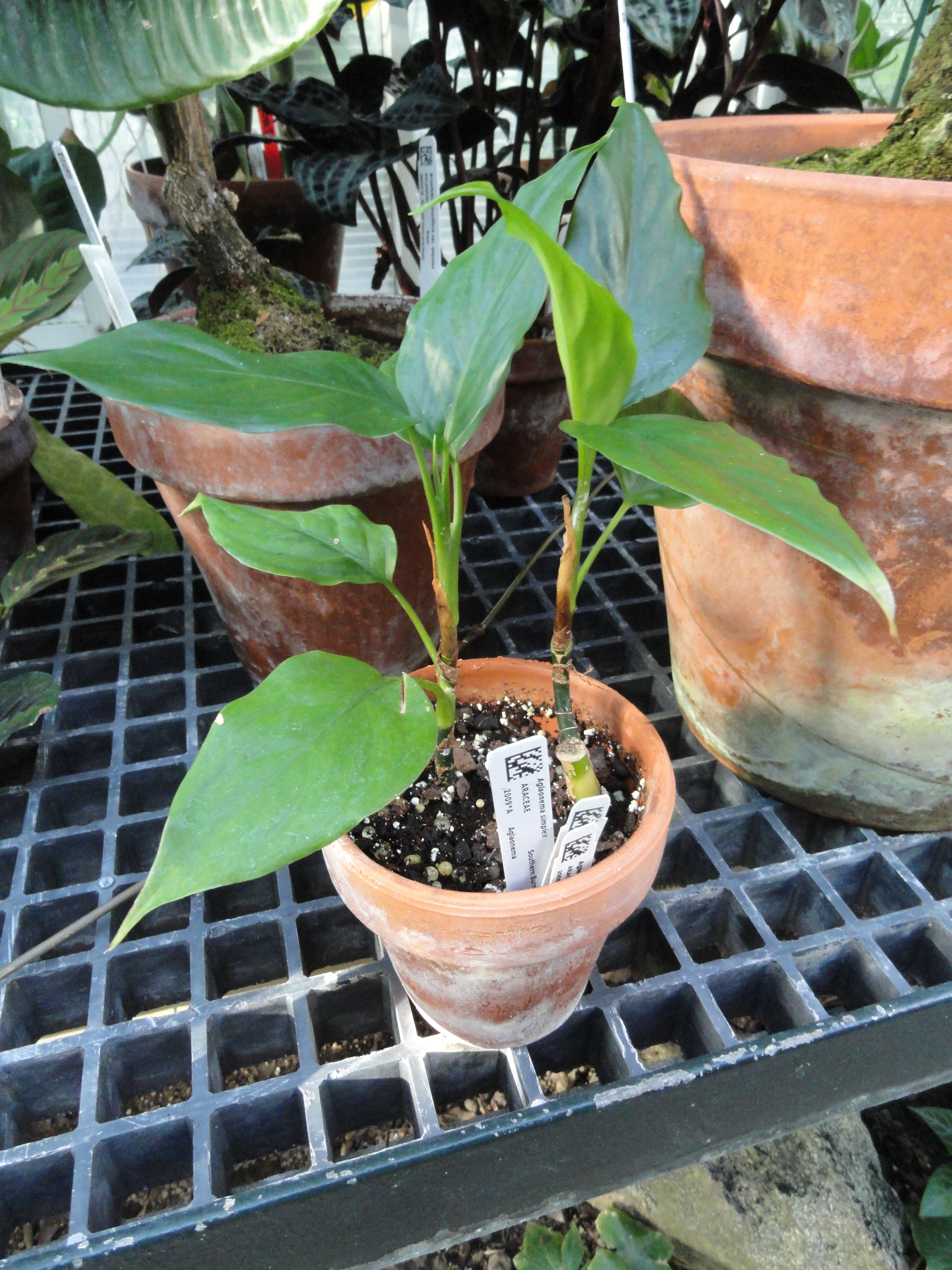

Conservation status
- Least Concern (IUCN 3.1)

Scientific classification
- Kingdom: Plantae
- Clade: Embryophytes
- Clade: Tracheophytes
- Clade: Spermatophytes
- Clade: Angiosperms
- Clade: Monocots
- Order: Alismatales
- Family: Araceae
- Genus: Aglaonema
- Species: A. simplex

Binomial name
- Aglaonema simplex (Blume) Blume

= Aglaonema simplex =

Species of plant

Aglaonema simplex, also known as the Malayan sword (Indonesian: kering, Javanese: wetune, Malay: penggeheh, Chinese: 常青粗肋草) is a perennial species of flowering plant in the family Araceae. It is native to Southeast Asia.

== Etymology ==
The specific epithet simplex derives from the Latin word for "single", referring to the fact that the species is single-stemmed.

== Description ==
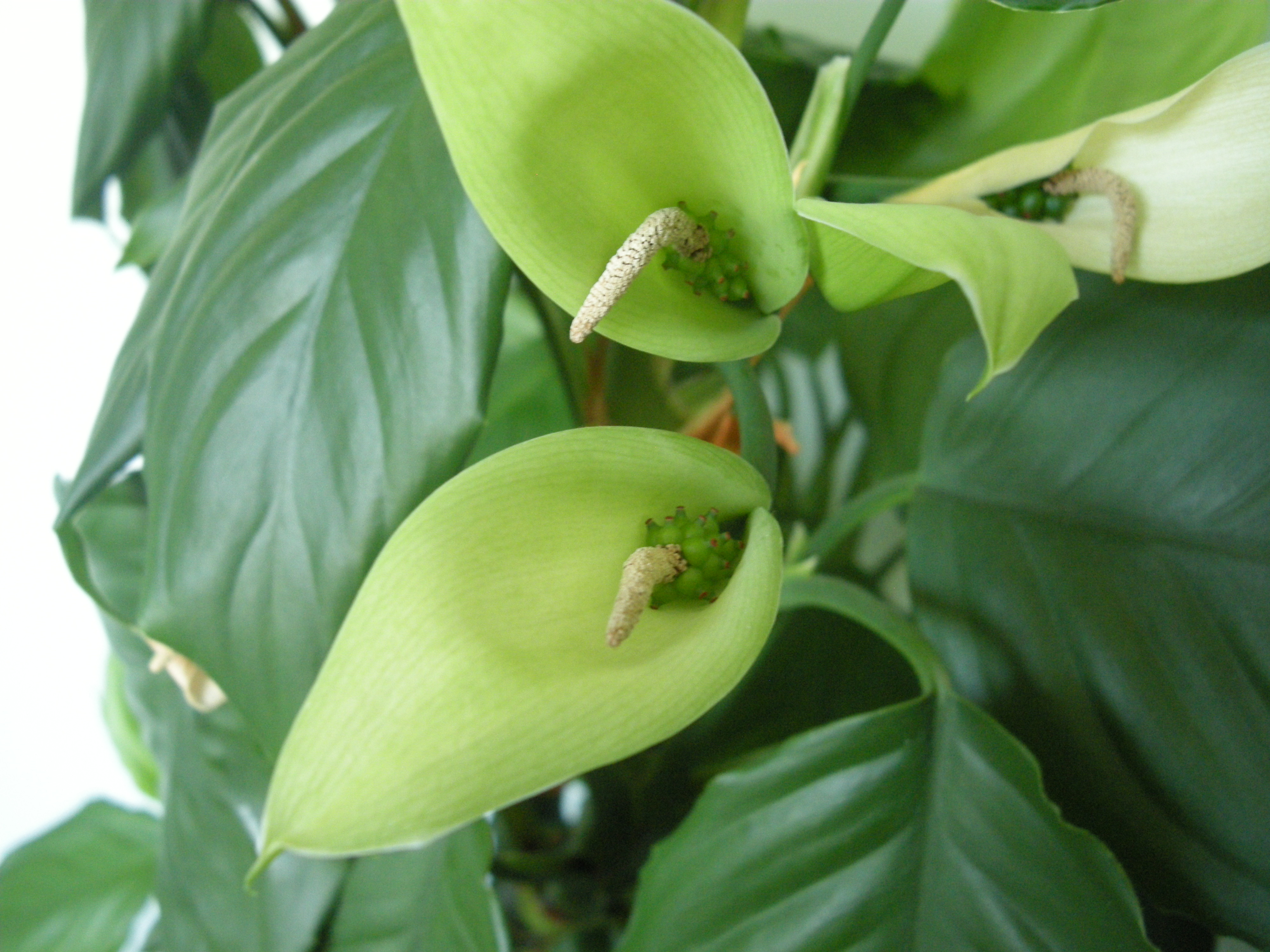
Its Flowers

The Malayan sword is a shrubby plant that grows to about 0.2 to 1.2 m (7.9 in to 3 ft 11.2 in) tall with straight stems. Its dark-green leaves are arranged spirally. The leaves are oval-shaped, with a length between 10 – 35 cm and a width between 1.9 – 25 cm, and sunken veins. The fruits are red and ovoid. The seeds are possibly dispersed by mammals and birds.

Its flowers are enclosed in a very greenish-white leaf. They are also a monoecious species. They are pollinated by carrion insects.

This species grows relatively slowly. They are suited to moist, well-drained soil although they are tolerant to waterlogging. They prefer to be situated in shaded areas. In addition, they can be propagated with cuttings. They begin to flower between late summer and early autumn.

This species contains 20 chromosomes. It also has a high amount of variation, with some individuals having narrow leaves, while others have broad leaves.

== Distribution ==
This flower is usually found wet tropical and sub-tropical forests and freshwater swamps in Bangladesh, Yunnan, Myanmar, Thailand, Laos, Cambodia, Vietnam, Philippines, Malaysia, Indonesia and Singapore. They can be found at elevations between 0 - 1500m.

== Status ==
The Aglaonema simplex is listed as least concern by the IUCN. While this species is abundant, its native habitat is threatened by deforestation for wood harvesting and wood plantations.

== Uses ==
=== Ornamental ===
This species is used in horticulture for the aquarium trade.

Due to its slow-growing nature, bushy appearance and its ability to filter air (though this would require a vast amount to have any notable effects on humans), they are popular as a houseplant and are commercially sold.

=== Medicinal ===
The leaves of the Aglaonema simplex are pounded in coconut oil to be rubbed on the bodies on pregnant women going through labour in order to hasten delivery and reduce childbirth pain.

In addition, a decoction made from the roots of this plant is used to treat edemas and fever.

In the leaves and stems of Aglaonema simplex, five different photocytotoxic pheophorbide-related compounds are present. Due to the way that they interact with human leukaemia cells, they have been proposed as a potential treatment for tumour cells.

== Toxicity ==
Like all Aglaonema species, Aglaonema simplex contains poisonous calcium oxalate crystals, which act as an irritant.
