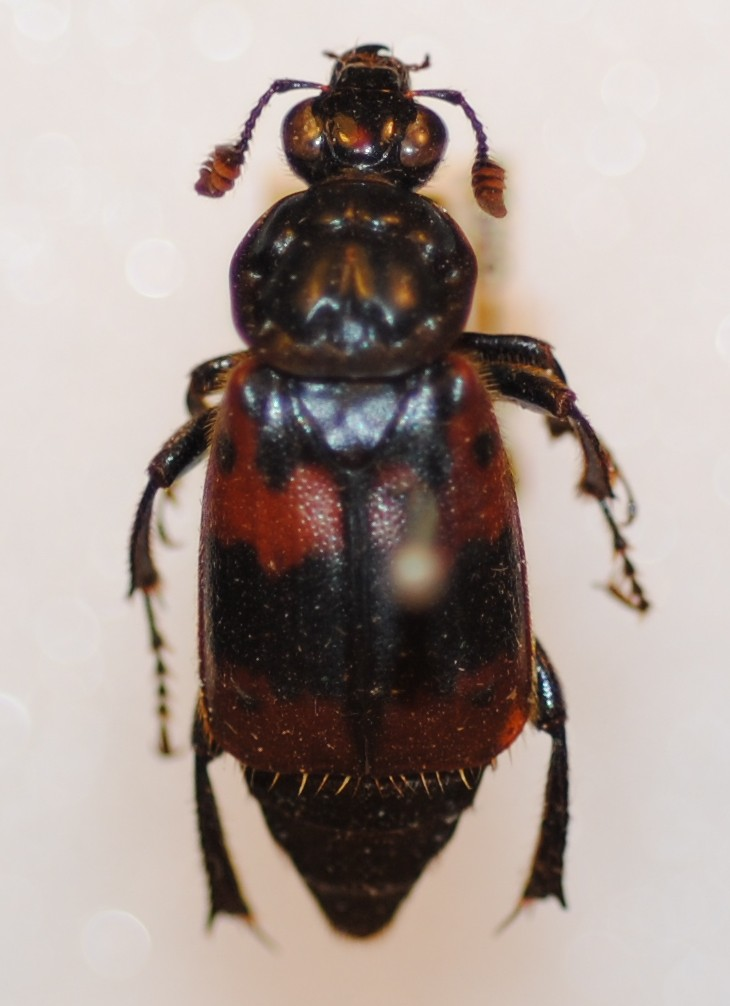

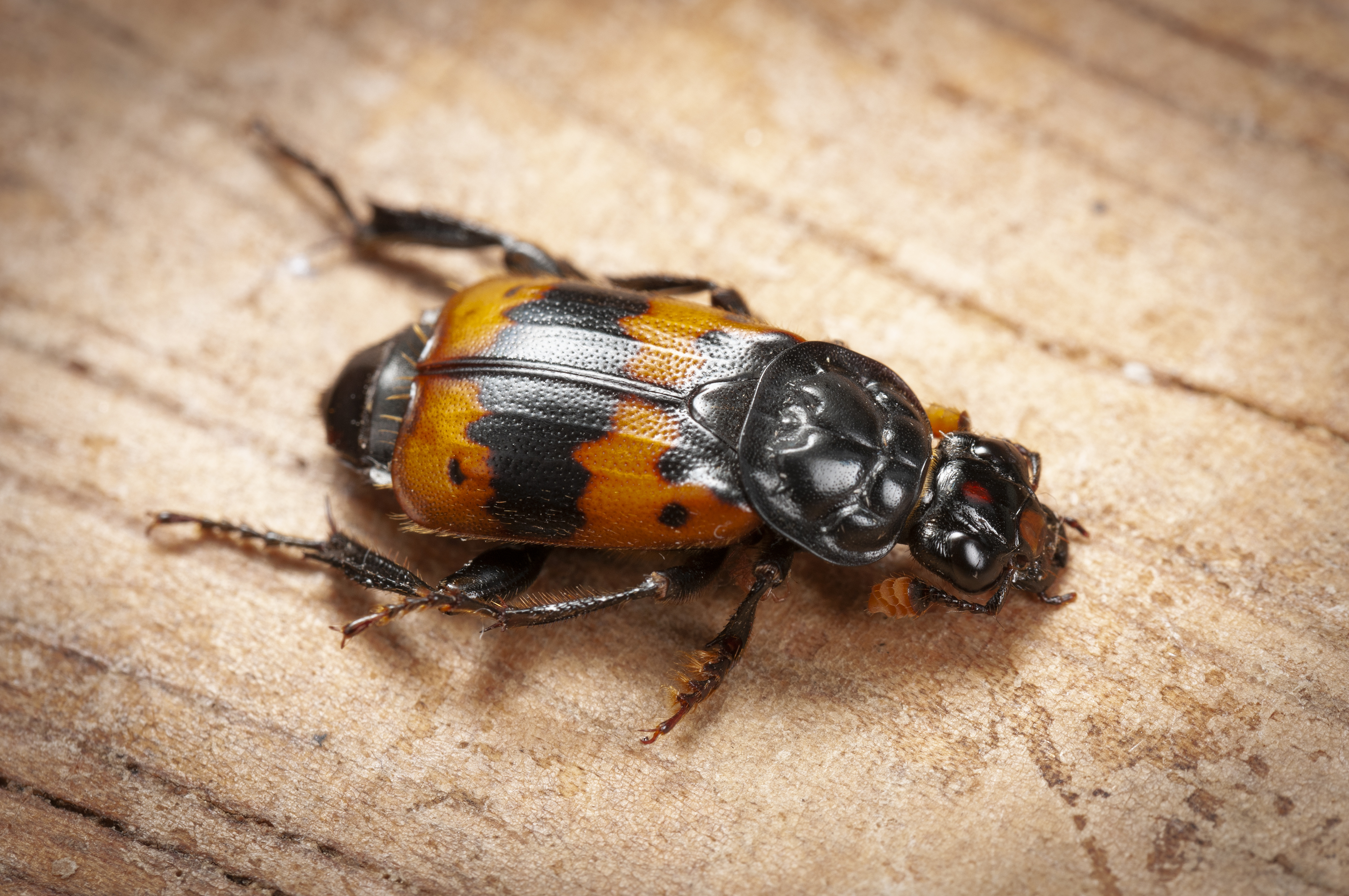
- Adult, South Korea

Scientific classification
- Kingdom: Animalia
- Phylum: Arthropoda
- Clade: Pancrustacea
- Class: Insecta
- Order: Coleoptera
- Suborder: Polyphaga
- Infraorder: Staphyliniformia
- Family: Staphylinidae
- Genus: Nicrophorus
- Species: N. quadripunctatus

Binomial name
- Nicrophorus quadripunctatus Kraatz, 1877

Synonyms
- Necrophorus [sic] maculifrons v. quadripunctatus Kraatz, 1877; Necrophorus [sic] quadripunctatus v. immaculatus Portevin, 1923

= Nicrophorus quadripunctatus =

Species of beetle

Nicrophorus quadripunctatus is a species of burying beetle that predominates in East Asia. First described by German entomologist Ernst Kraatz in 1877, this beetle has since been the subject of much scientific inquiry—particularly concerning its parental care. Like other burying beetles, N. quadripunctatus inhabit small, vertebrate animal carcasses. This environment provides the beetles with the requisite nutrients for themselves and their offspring. To limit resource theft and predation, the carcass is buried underground. For additional protection, a single, dominant male-female pair guards the carcass cooperatively.

Adult N. quadripunctatus have an average pronotum width of around 5 mm, and are identifiable by their horizontal red striping on their elytra. They possess formidable mandibles capable of tearing into carcasses. They also have a pair of chemoreceptor antennae for locating carrion. N. quadripunctatus engage in both female and male intrasexual competition for mates and are typically monogamous. Once mated, they exhibit biparental care for their offspring.

== Habitat ==
N. quadripunctatus have been frequently sighted in the forest regions of Japan, South Korea, and eastern Russia, but they do not exclusively inhabit these areas. Optimal reproduction temperature for these beetles is around 20˚C, which is reflected in their preferred climate. Temperatures of 25 °C and higher are detrimental to the beetle’s oviposition.

N. quadripunctatus emerge above ground according to a bimodal seasonal pattern with distinct peaks in May and September. However, much of the burying beetle’s life is spent underground in its burrow with its ball of carrion, either as larvae, or raising larvae of its own.

== Diet ==
N. quadripunctatus are carnivorous scavengers. They play a critical role in breaking down organic matter and recycling its nutrients back into the soil. They mainly eat the carrion they bury, which often consists of mice or small birds. Until they are ready to undergo metamorphosis and leave the burrow, larvae will eat liquefied flesh regurgitated by their parents. If the carcass is infested with flies, the beetle may eat the flies’ eggs and larvae as well. When food is scarce, N. quadripunctatus have also been shown to cannibalize their larvae. The larvae that beg the most for food are often the first to be cannibalized.

=== Preparation of carrion ===
N. quadripunctatus bury animal carcasses for sustenance and safety. It takes approximately 12 hours from the time of carrion discovery to when it is buried and inhabited, and there is an extensive procedure to prepare the carcass into suitable condition for the beetles. Once a carcass is located through the chemoreceptors in the antennae, a breeding pair works together to strip the body of all its fur and feathers. The mandibles are used like scissors to trim the animal’s coat. After this is completed, the pair rolls the carcass into a ball and begins to tunnel beneath it. This loosens the soil, causing the ball to slowly sink into the ground. If the soil is too hard to tunnel through however, N. quadripunctatus can roll the carrion ball to another location more suitable for digging. In order to do this, the beetle flips on its back, wiggles underneath the carcass, and propels it forward using its legs. This is an especially difficult maneuver considering the large difference between the weight of the beetles and the carcasses they want to bury. Indeed, another species of burying beetle, Nicophorus Americanus, has been observed rolling a carcass that exceeds its own body weight 200-fold.

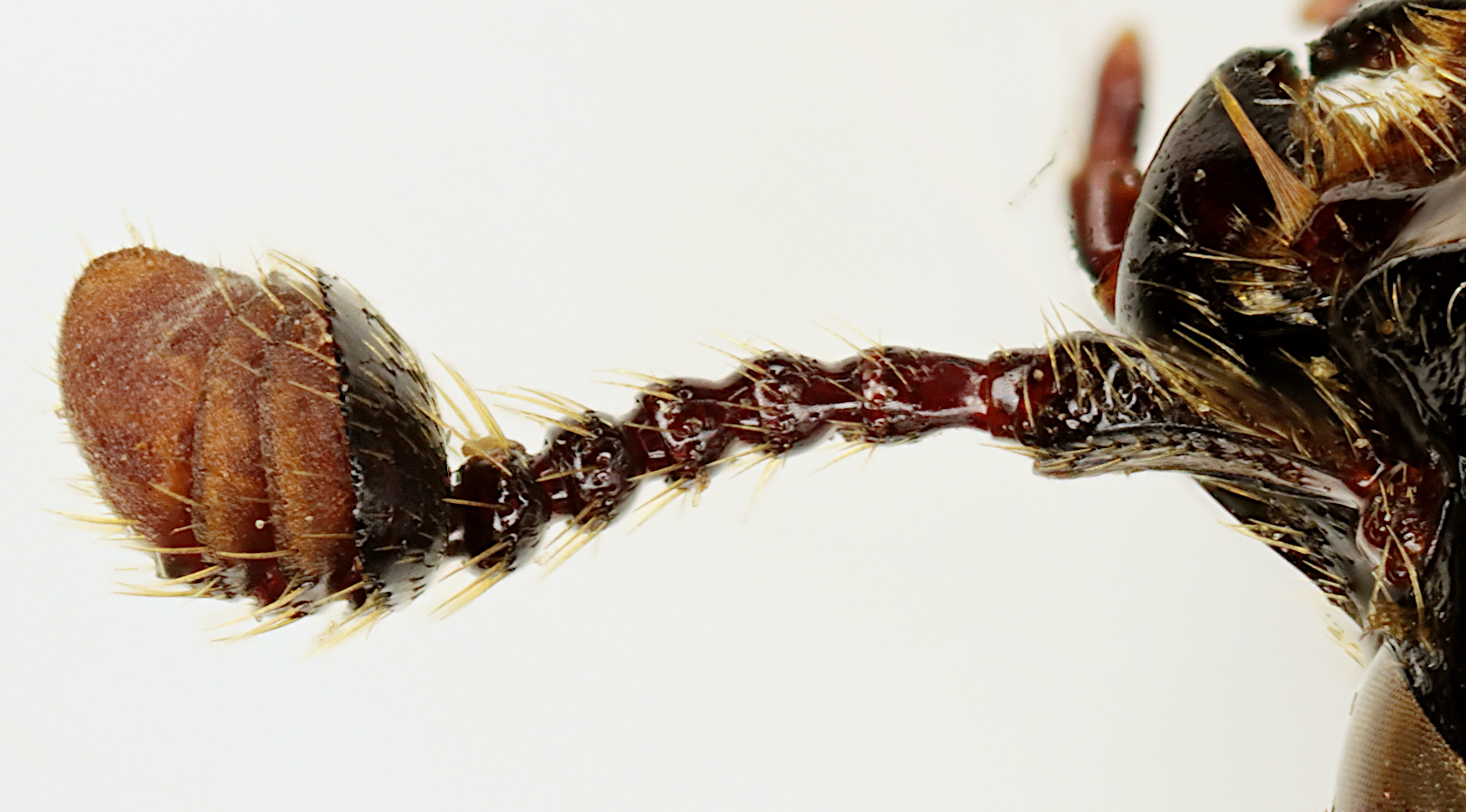
Chemoreceptive antenna of a burying beetle

Once in the ground, the beetles treat the body with oral and anal secretions. These reduce intra- and interspecies conflict, thus extending the carrion’s utility to the beetle. The secretions mask the rotting smell, which would otherwise attract the attention of other burying beetles, or scavengers in general (e.g. flies). In addition, experiments have shown the secretions to have antibacterial and antifungal properties. Without the chemical coat provided by N. quadripunctatus, mold can prematurely decompose the carcass. Some researchers have hypothesized the phospholipase A_{2} in the oral secretion could act as a preservative, although the true mechanism of preservation is yet unknown.

== Parental care ==
N. quadripunctatus care for their young biparentally, meaning both the male and female assume caretaking responsibilities. This increases the maximum number of offspring that can be reared contemporaneously. Such care has been suggested to be indispensable to the survival of progeny. Without a parent to regurgitate carrion, few larvae survive to the post-feeding stage. However, this comes at the cost of future fecundity. If occupied with caring for their offspring, the beetles cannot continue to reproduce. This trade-off between current and future reproduction is a concept fundamental to ecology. In a biparental model this is further complicated. Here, optimal investment of a N. quadripunctatus beetle should account for the investment of its cooperating partner, according to negotiation game theory. This informs the establishment of an evolutionarily stable strategy that is resistant to the destabilization of intrapair conflict. Despite this, facultative behavior is observed in a limited capacity. When their mate was handicapped with the attachment of a 0.2 g weight to its pronotum, neither male nor female N. quadripunctatus adjusted their rates of provisioning. Only in the absence of a female partner did males adjust their effort.

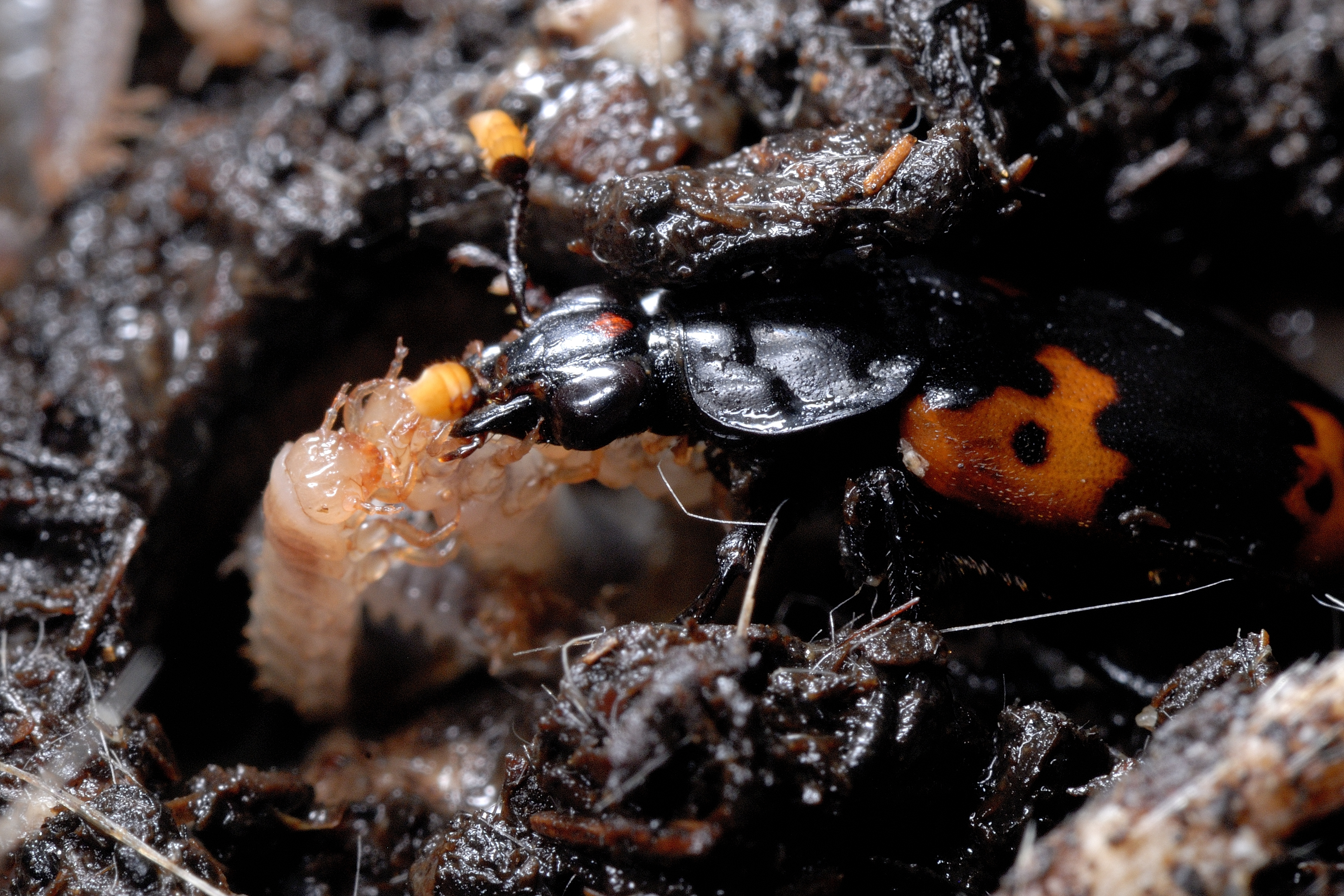
Burying beetle feeding larvae

Male and female N. quadripunctatus share in the responsibility of caretaking tasks. These include: burying the carrion, guarding against intruders, carrion maintenance, and feeding the larvae. Notably, the division of labor is not always equivalent. For example, females carry a greater share of the burying and feeding burden. In contrast, males spend a greater time guarding against intruders than their female partners.

Carrion invasion has particularly deleterious effects. As a result, guarding occupies much of the resident parents’ time. Inferior conspecifics reside near the carcass, acting as satellite males and brood parasites. If they are successful in invading, the resident parents’ offspring are killed and possession of the invaluable carcass is transferred to the invader. The body size of the defender is predictive of its ability to repel intruders, and therefore the larger males often have a higher probability of success in defending the brood. The males are also more likely to injure themselves when guarding. This may, in part, be due to the fact that they have more to lose. While females can replace their brood after infanticide by mating with the invading beetle, males are not afforded this consolation. In any case, simultaneous guarding by both the mother and father is more effective than the father alone. Experiments have shown that this cooperation enables the repulsion of stronger intruders with greater success.

== Social behavior ==
The mother lays her eggs in the soil nearby the carrion. Eggs are often laid asynchronously, so hatching also takes place asynchronously. Once they hatch, they migrate to the carrion to be fed by their parents. Larvae are in direct competition with each other for food resources. This is exacerbated by the different hatching times. Early hatching larvae typically obtain more food and grow to be larger and stronger.

N. quadripunctatus larvae beg to be fed by their parents by raising their head and waving their legs in the direction of their parents mouths. Without parental assistance, N. quadripunctatus are unable to obtain food, and thus die before the dispersal stage. Mothers elicit begging through the emission of the antimicrobial, aromatic compound, 2-phenoxyethanol. This compound is secreted into the parent’s regurgitation prior to provisioning. Pheromone-informed begging is postulated to be a cost reducing behavior for both parents and larvae because it limits superfluous begging. The intensity of the begging behavior is indicative of how hungry the larva is. Larvae exhibit more begging towards the mother than father, regardless of hunger status.

== Life cycle ==
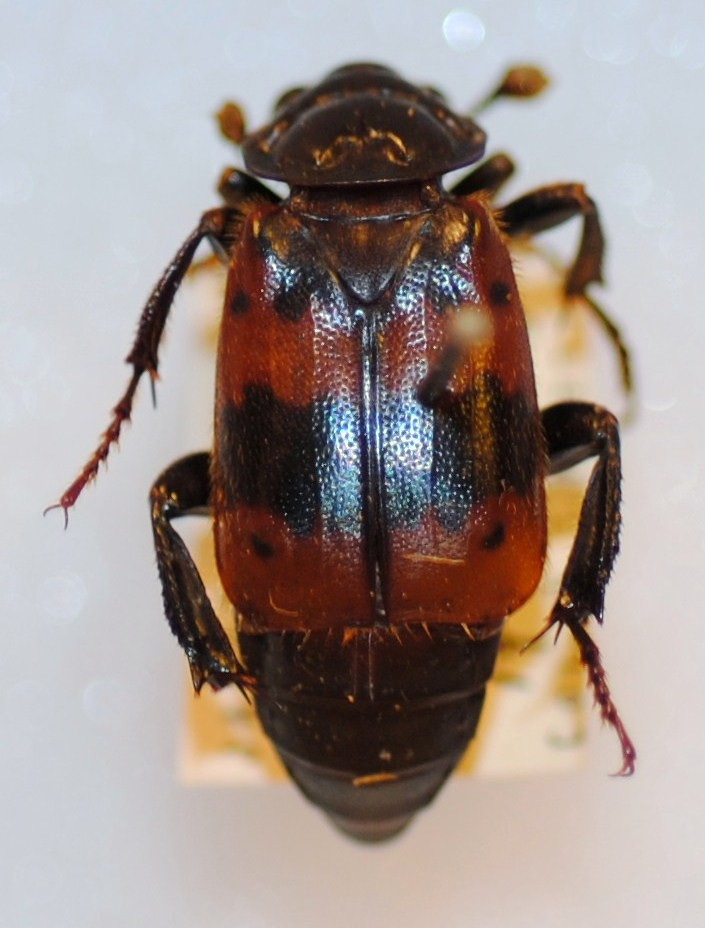
Nicrophorus Quadripunctatus imago

There are five distinct stages of the N. quadripunctatus’ life cycle. To begin, after a breeding pair of N. quadripunctatus locate and prepare carrion, the female will lay her eggs in a nearby location. Two days after being laid, the eggs hatch and larvae migrate to the carrion. Once in the carcass, the offspring are called feeding larvae and are cared for by the parents. After approximately six days, offspring enter their post-feeding larva stage and move to nearby soil. They pupate in cells in the soil for approximately eight days after which they shed their exoskeletons in a process called ecdysis. At this point, the N. quadripunctatus emerge from their cells as adult beetles, also known as imago. The beetles then rise above the soil to locate carrion and start families of their own and the cycle begins again.

== Mating ==
=== Mate searching ===
N. quadripunctatus males emit pheromones to attract mates. To do so, they climb up to an elevated location and raise their abdomen in the air. Although not necessary for copulation, males that have found a carcass prior to emitting pheromones experience greater certainty of paternity. The female can either accept copulation by bending the tip of her abdomen upwards, or reject copulation by bending the tip of her abdomen downwards. The latter behavior prevents the intromission of the male aedeagus, although the maneuver is not always successful.

There is frequent intrasexual conflict between males for female partners. Larger males are advantaged in these contests, and thus experience greater opportunity for copulation. Additionally, female N. quadripunctatus have been shown to accept copulation with larger males at higher rates, than with smaller males. There is no difference in copulation duration between larger males and smaller males. Females use superior fighting ability as a proxy for fitness. Therefore, in selecting larger partners, they maximize reproductive success by mating with dominant males. There is no difference in copulation duration, however, between larger males and smaller males.

=== Female–male interactions ===
Once a male and female mate, they often defend their brood together, even after the larvae have hatched. They will attack predators and any intruders cooperatively. Inferior individuals may stay in near proximity as a satellite male in case the male mate is injured or killed. Male and female mate pairs provide biparental care to the offspring and will work together to defend carcasses and feed larvae as well.
