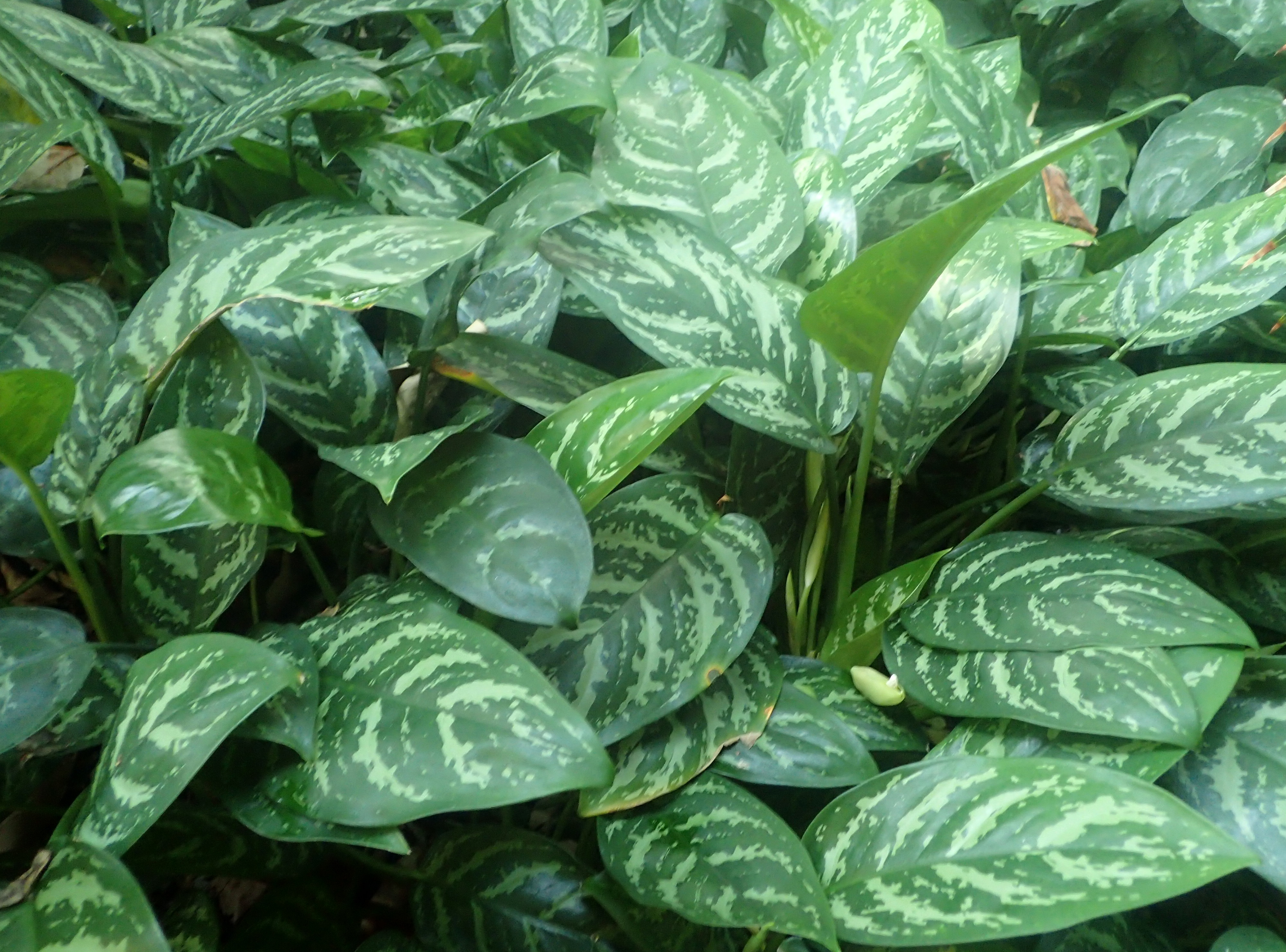
- At the Missouri Botanical Garden
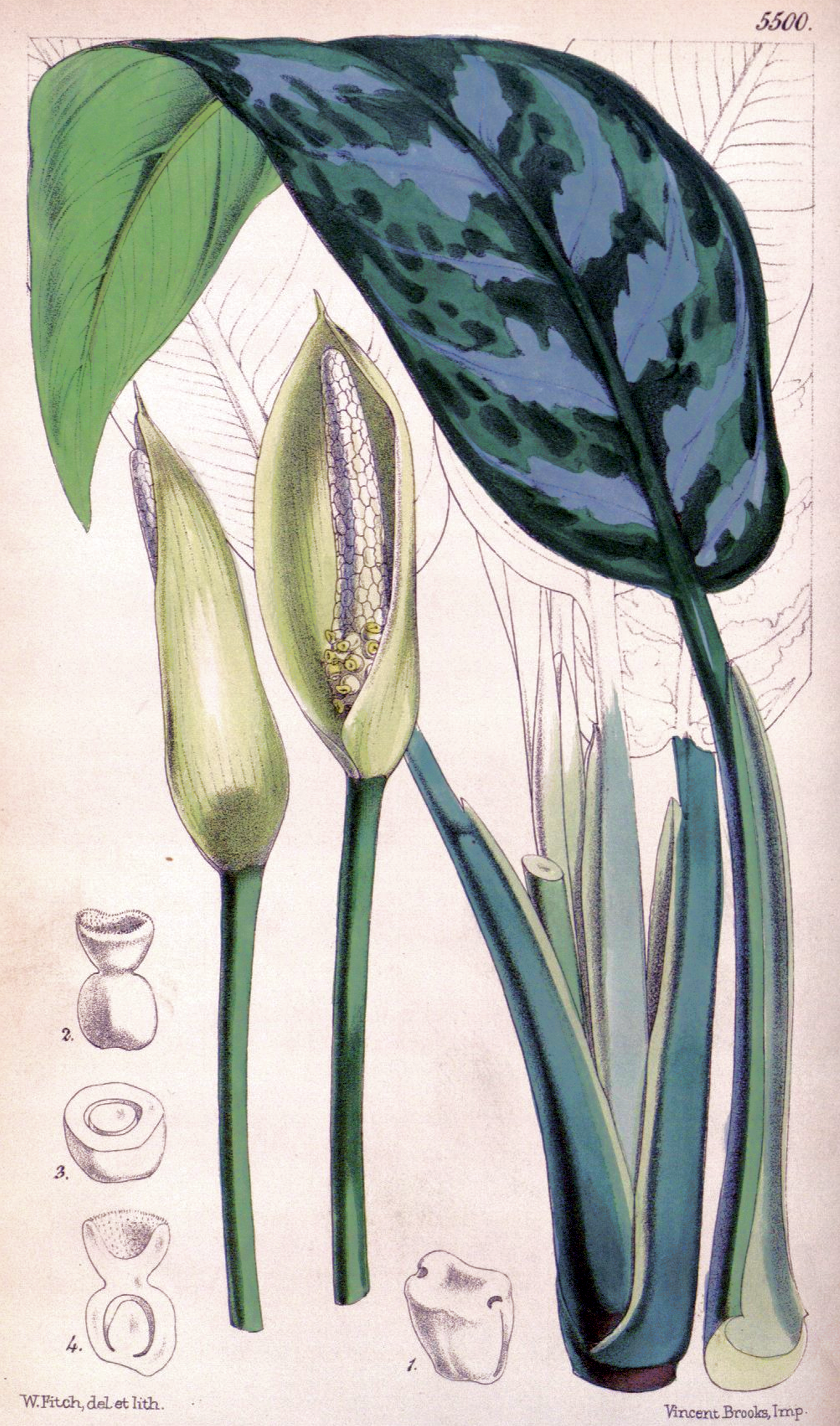
- Aglaonema commutatum var. maculatum botanical illustration

Scientific classification
- Kingdom: Plantae
- Clade: Embryophytes
- Clade: Tracheophytes
- Clade: Angiosperms
- Clade: Monocots
- Order: Alismatales
- Family: Araceae
- Genus: Aglaonema
- Species: A. commutatum

Binomial name
- Aglaonema commutatum Schott

Synonyms
- Aglaonema commutatum f. concolor Jervis; Aglaonema commutatum f. elegans (Engl.) Jervis; Aglaonema commutatum var. picturatum Jervis; Aglaonema commutatum f. viridans Jervis; Aglaonema elegans Engl.; Aglaonema maculatum Blume; Aglaonema robustum Alderw.; Aglaonema warburgii Engl.

= Aglaonema commutatum =

Species of flowering plant

Aglaonema commutatum, the poison dart plant, is a species of flowering plant in the Chinese evergreen genus Aglaonema, family Araceae. It is native to the Philippines and northeastern Sulawesi, and has been introduced to other tropical locales, including Cuba, Puerto Rico, Trinidad and Tobago, Comoros, the Chagos Archipelago, India, Bangladesh, and the Cook Islands. Its hybrid cultivar 'Silver Queen' (with A. nitidum) has gained the Royal Horticultural Society's Award of Garden Merit as a houseplant.

== Subtaxa ==
The following varieties are accepted:

- Aglaonema commutatum var. commutatum – central Luzon
- Aglaonema commutatum var. elegans (Engl.) Nicolson – central Luzon
- Aglaonema commutatum var. maculatum (Hook.f.) Nicolson – central Luzon
- Aglaonema commutatum var. warburgii (Engl.) Nicolson – northeast Sulawesi
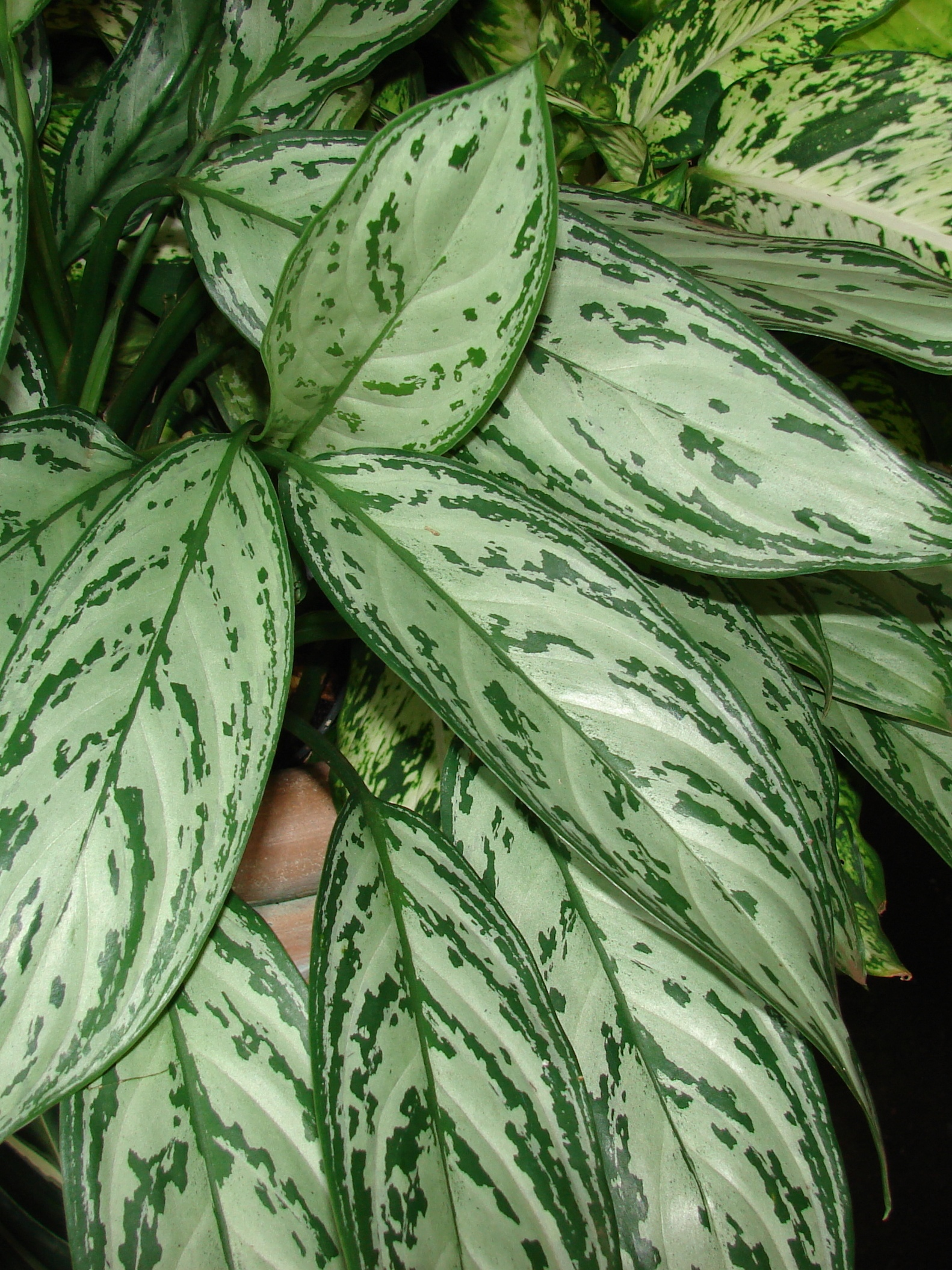
'Silver Queen' hybrid cultivar.

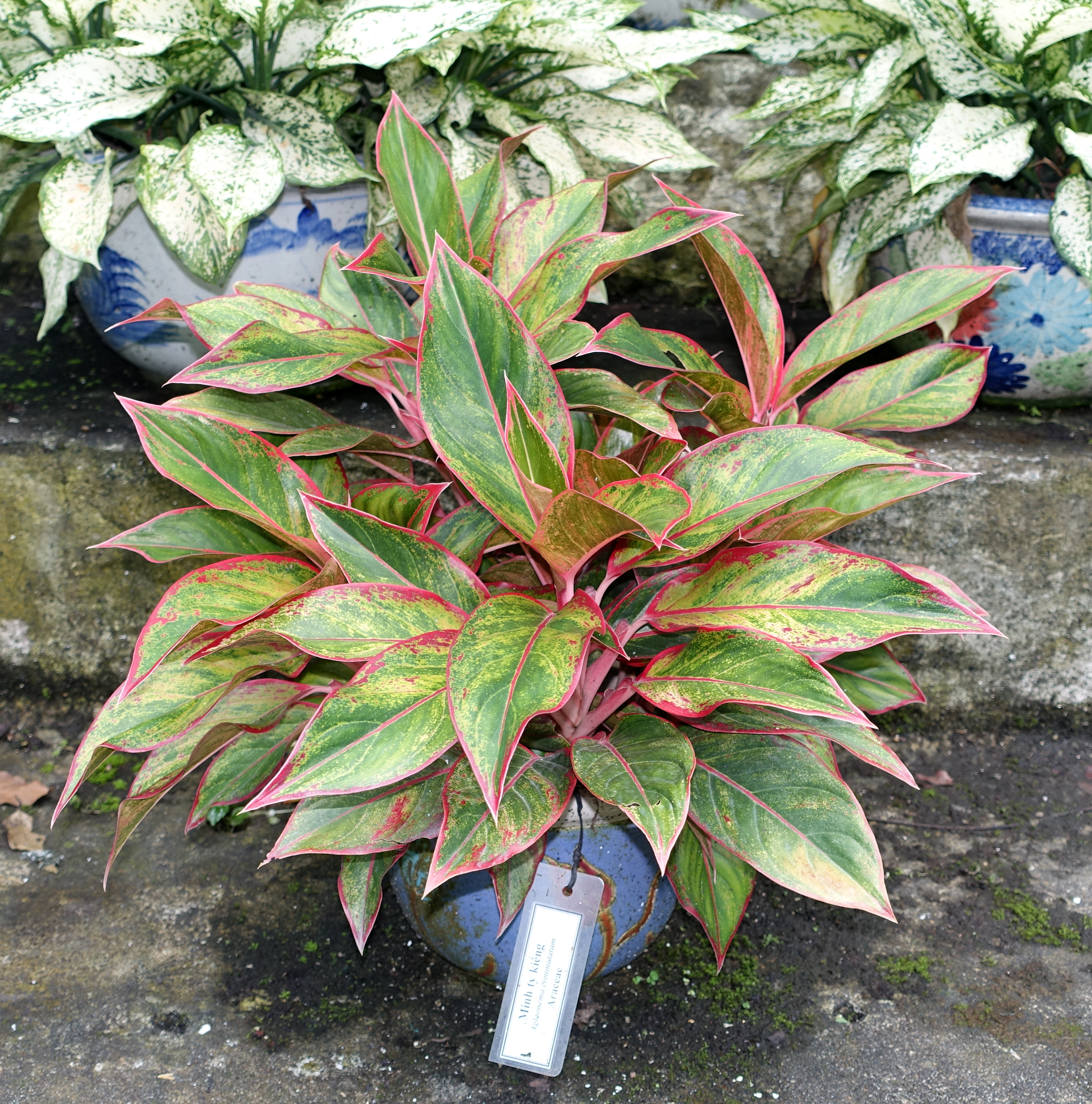
A cultivar with red-edged leaves, ‘Siam Aurora’.

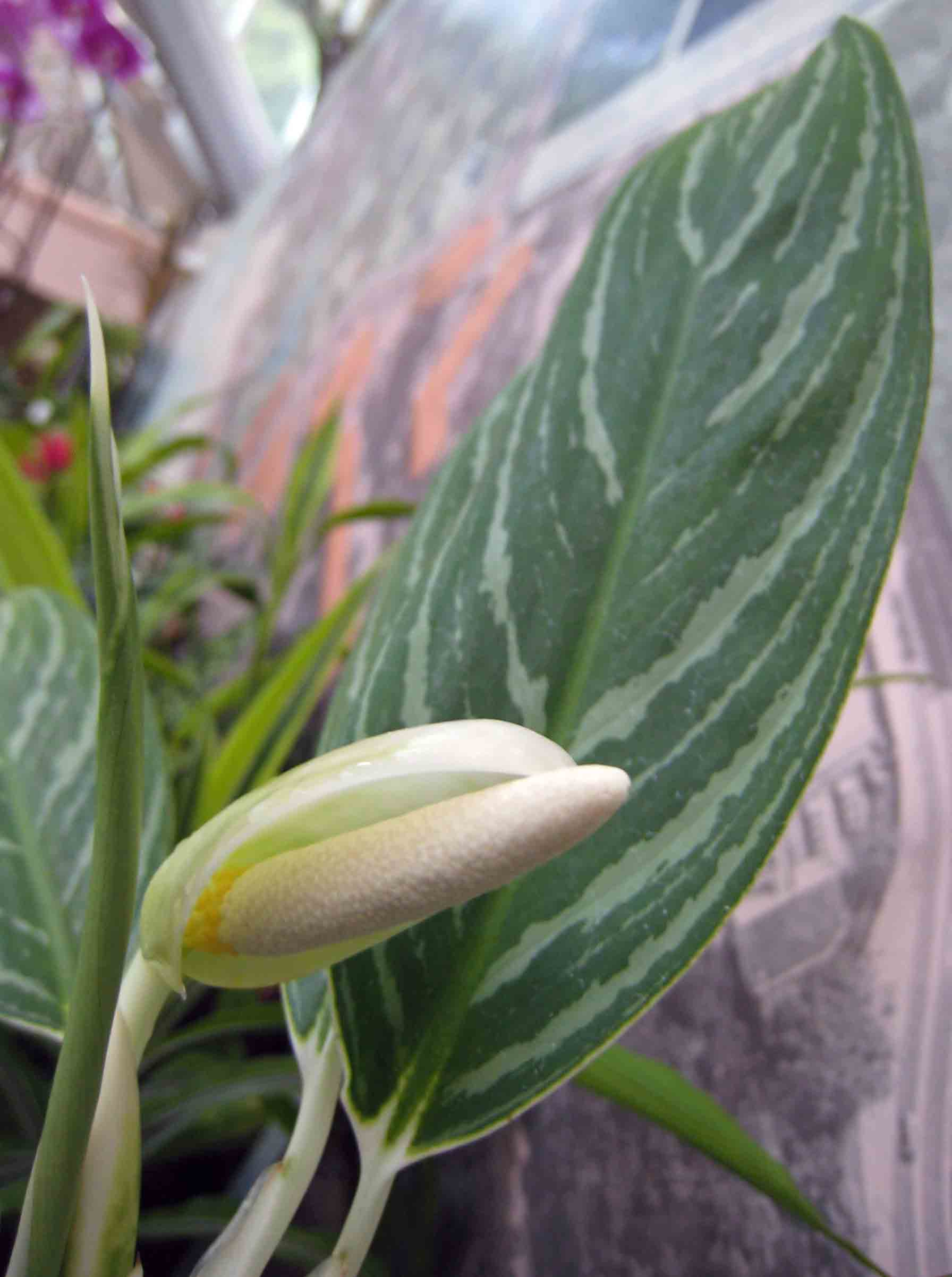
Flower.

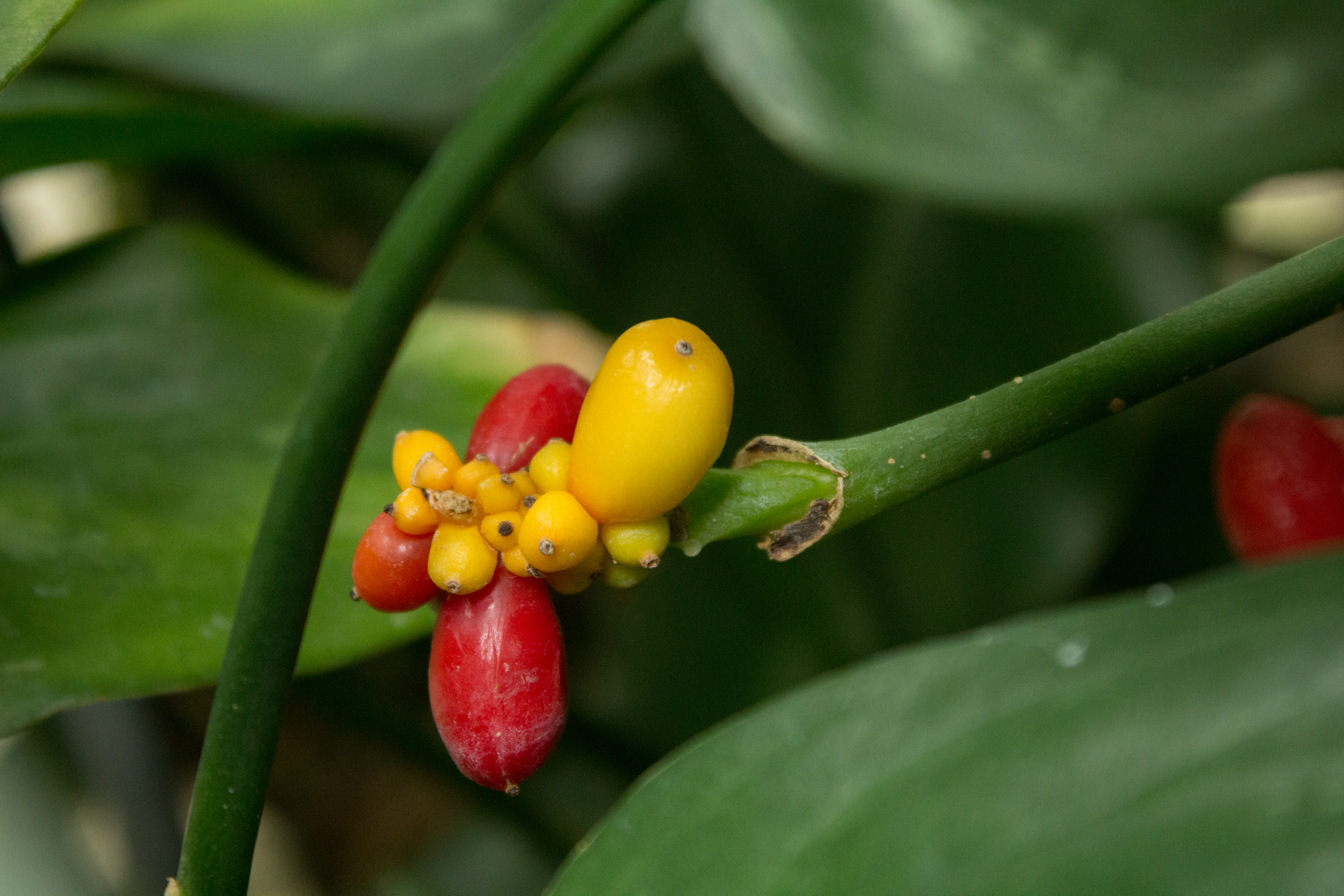
Close-up of fruit.
