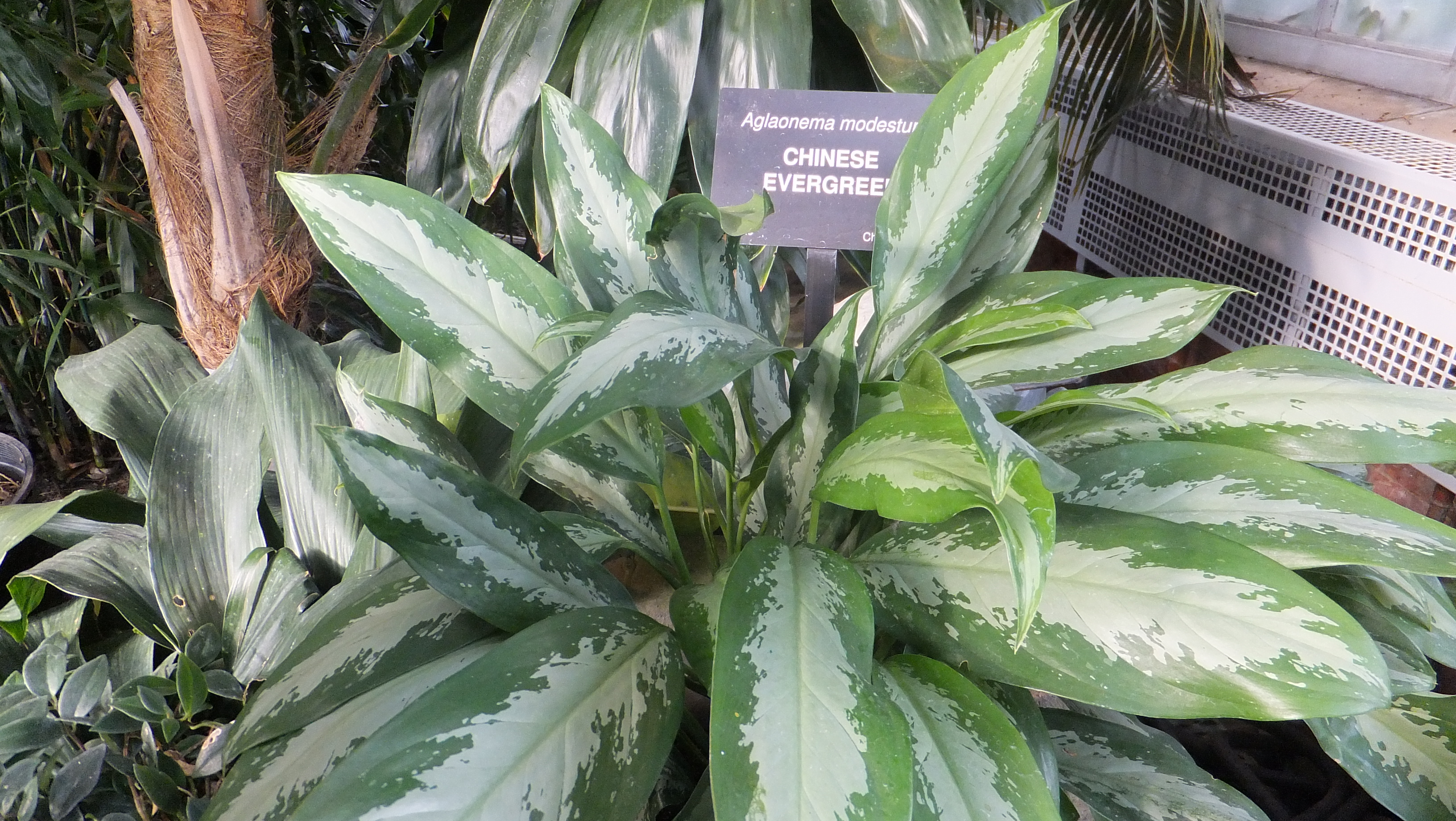
- At the Belle Isle Conservatory
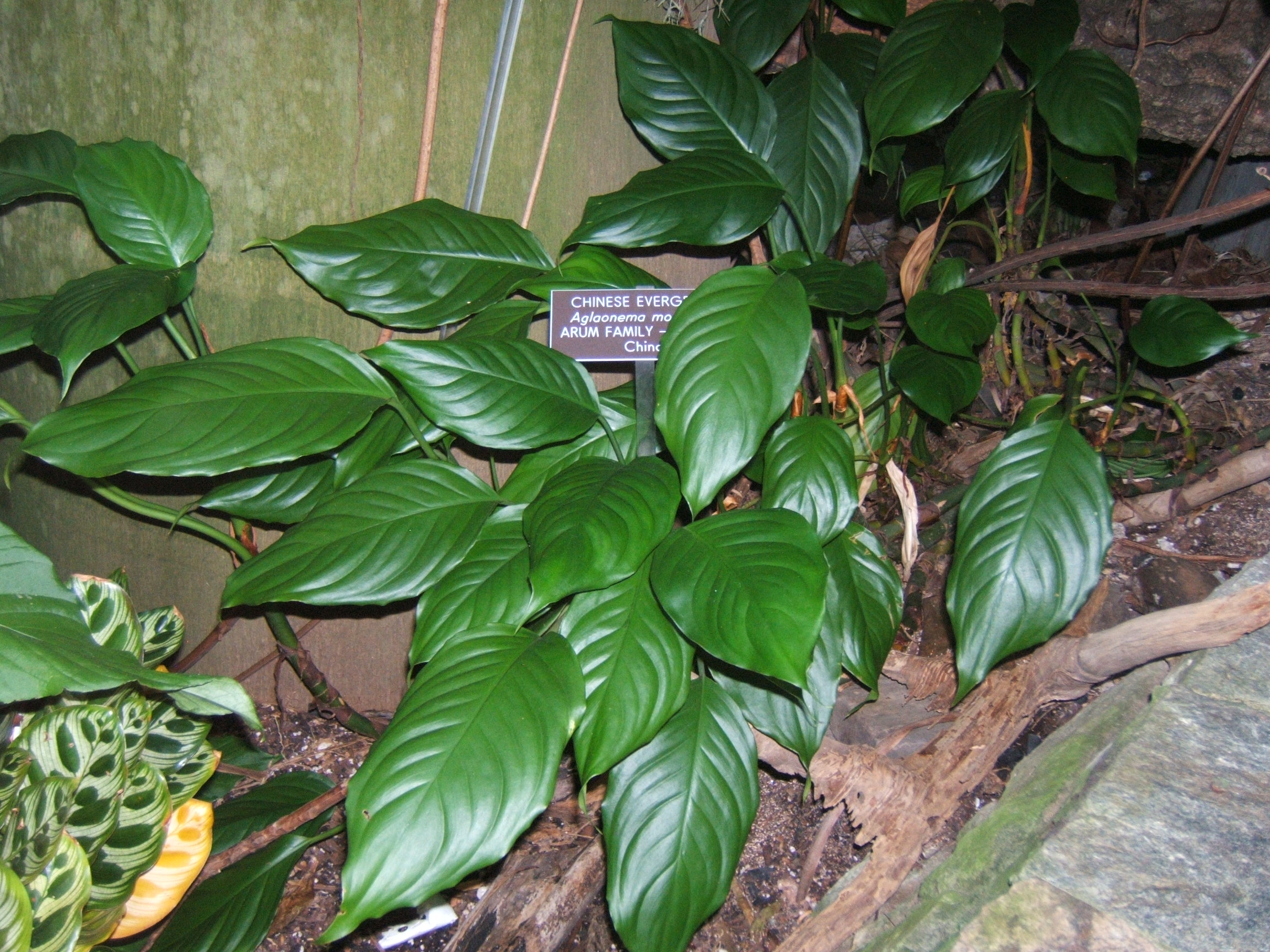
- A wild-type at the United States Botanic Garden

Scientific classification
- Kingdom: Plantae
- Clade: Tracheophytes
- Clade: Angiosperms
- Clade: Monocots
- Order: Alismatales
- Family: Araceae
- Genus: Aglaonema
- Species: A. modestum

Binomial name
- Aglaonema modestum Schott ex Engl.

Synonyms
- Aglaonema acutispathum N.E.Br.; Aglaonema laoticum Gagnep.

= Aglaonema modestum =

Species of flowering plant

Aglaonema modestum, called Chinese evergreen, green-for-ten-thousand-years, and lily of China, is a species of flowering plant in the genus Aglaonema, native to Bangladesh, Thailand, Laos, Vietnam, and southeast and south-central China. In these areas, it is found in tropical swamps and rainforests.

== Cultivation ==
It has gained the Royal Horticultural Society's Award of Garden Merit.

A. modestum is typically 30–90 cm (1–3 ft) tall and 60–120 cm (2–4 ft) wide. It occasionally produces white spathe-and-spadix flowers that give way to oval-shaped, reddish fruits that are 25–75 mm (1–3 in) long. Its lance-shaped leaves measure 200 mm × 100 mm (8 in × 4 in), and are borne on 300 mm (12 in) stalks that arise from a central growing point.

A. modestum requires a shaded location, and should not be exposed to temperatures below 7 °C (45 °F), which can damage the foliage. It cannot endure direct sunlight and is a good choice for dimly lit rooms. It requires ample moisture except for a very short winter rest period, in which watering can be somewhat reduced. Young plants should be repotted every spring, while mature specimens need be repotted only every two to three years.

== Toxicity ==
This plant contains calcium oxalate crystals which are poisonous to humans, dogs, cats, and horses. If ingested, it may cause severe burning and swelling in the mouth and tongue. Contact with the sap may also cause skin irritation.
