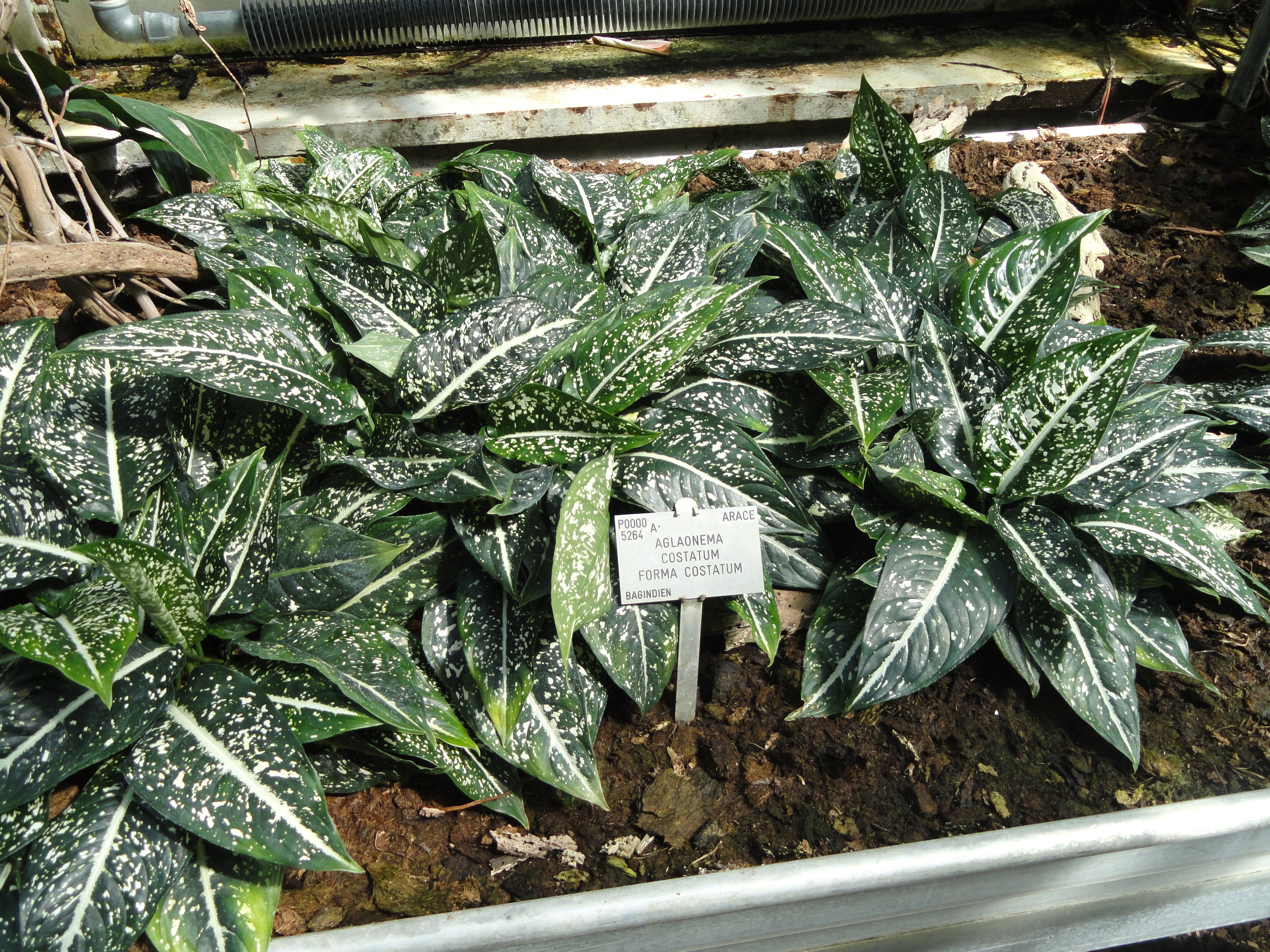
- At the University of Copenhagen Botanical Garden
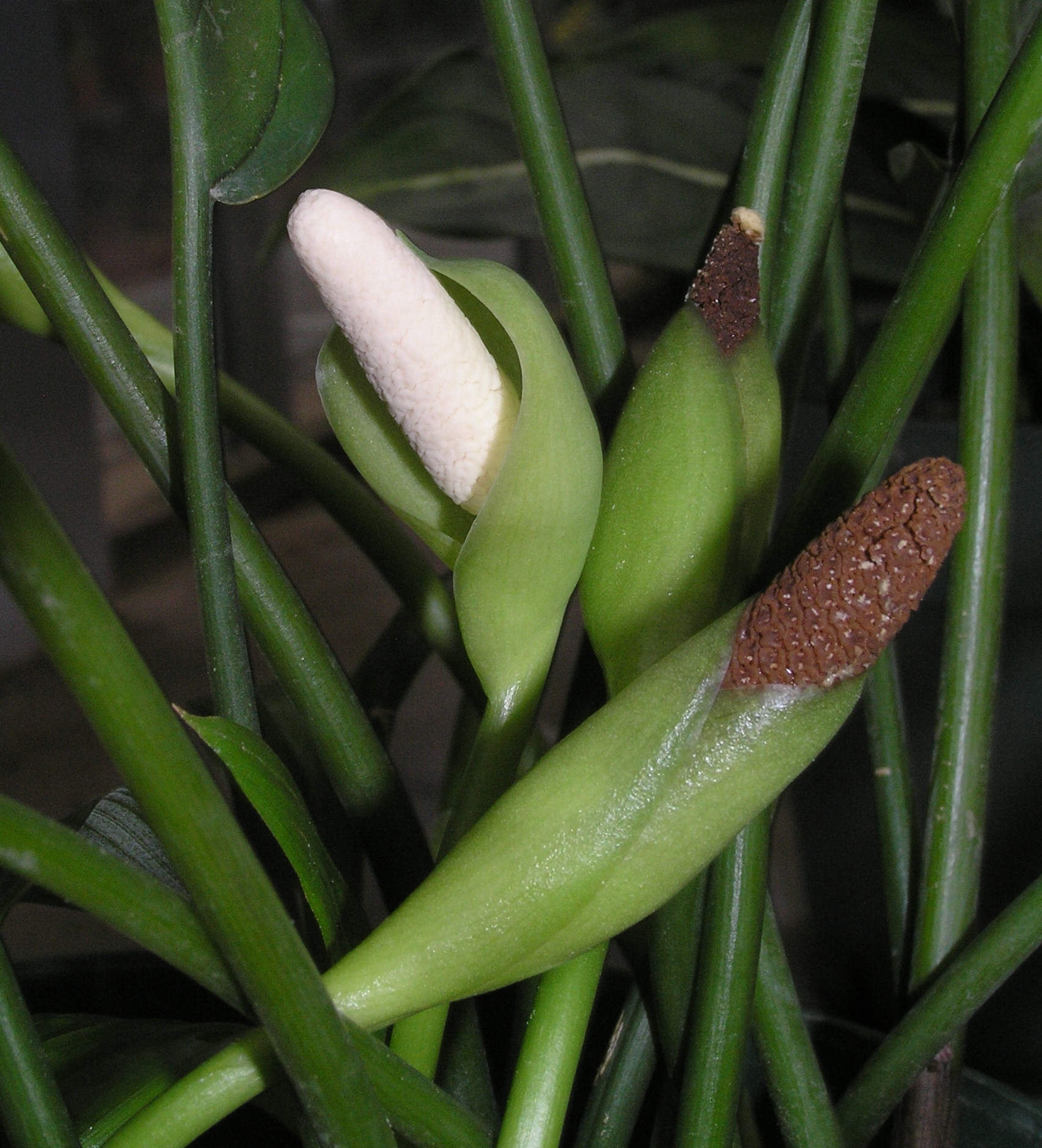
- Aglaonema costatum f. immaculatum

Scientific classification
- Kingdom: Plantae
- Clade: Embryophytes
- Clade: Tracheophytes
- Clade: Angiosperms
- Clade: Monocots
- Order: Alismatales
- Family: Araceae
- Genus: Aglaonema
- Species: A. costatum

Binomial name
- Aglaonema costatum N.E.Br.

Synonyms
- Aglaonema costatum f. foxii (Engl.) Jervis

= Aglaonema costatum =

Species of flowering plant

Aglaonema costatum, called the spotted evergreen, is a species of flowering plant in the genus Aglaonema, native to Bangladesh, Thailand, Peninsular Malaysia, Laos, Cambodia and Vietnam. In these areas, the plant is typically found growing in the understory of tropical rain forests. Its putative form, Aglaonema costatum f. immaculatum, called the unspotted Chinese evergreen, has gained the Royal Horticultural Society's Award of Garden Merit.

A. costatum typically reaches about 60 cm tall and 30-45 cm wide. Its leaves are typically about 20 centimeters long, ovately shaped, with entire margins. They are green, with a white stripe along the midrib and a number of irregularly shaped white spots. In the summer, it produces white spathe-and-spadix flowers, about 2–3.5 centimeters long.

As a result of the calcium oxalate crystals found in all parts of the plant, it will irritate the mouth and esophagus of a human who ingests it, and it is toxic to cats and dogs.
