= Aglaonema nebulosum =

Scientific classification
- Kingdom: Plantae
- Clade: Tracheophytes
- Clade: Angiosperms
- Clade: Monocots
- Order: Alismatales
- Family: Araceae
- Genus: Aglaonema
- Species: A. nebulosum

Binomial name
- Aglaonema nebulosum N.E.Br.

Species of flowering plant

Aglaonema nebulosum is a species of flowering plant in the family Araceae. It is native to Assam, India.

== Distribution ==
Aglaonema nebulosum can be found in Malaya, Borneo, Java and the east coast of Sumatra.

=== India ===
This species can be found at elevations between 1100-1600m above sea level. Three separate populations were found in the villages of Urmasi, Nongtrai and Tynra. The total number of individuals in these populations were found to be 384. They are found in montane sub-tropical regions in the moister habitats near water streams.

== Description ==
The plant starts to flower in November and persists to do so until March. Fruiting also commences in September and matures by April.

This species can grow to about 70–150 cm tall. It has a stem diameter of 0.5–1.0 cm. 5–27 cm long petioles with leaves being 19.6-26.3 cm long and 9.6–11.4 cm wide.
