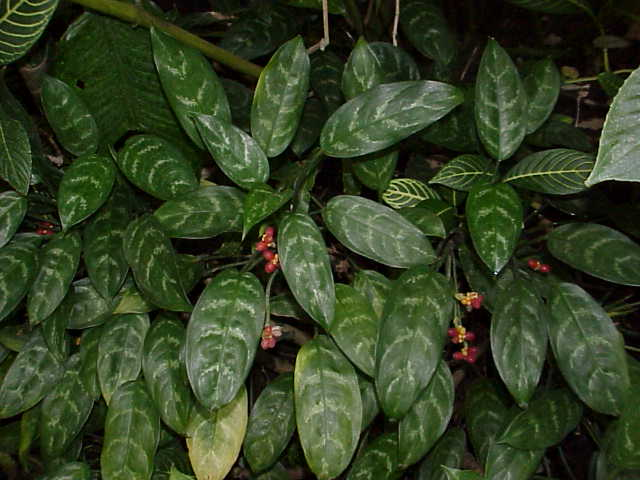
- Aglaonema commutatum

Scientific classification
- Kingdom: Plantae
- Clade: Tracheophytes
- Clade: Angiosperms
- Clade: Monocots
- Order: Alismatales
- Family: Araceae
- Subfamily: Aroideae
- Tribe: Aglaonemateae
- Genus: Aglaonema; Schott

= Aglaonema =

Genus of flowering plants

Aglaonema is a genus of flowering plants in the arum family, Araceae. They are native to tropical and subtropical regions of Asia and New Guinea. They are known commonly as Chinese evergreens.

== Description ==
These are evergreen perennials with stems growing erect or decumbent and creeping. Stems that grow along the ground may root at the nodes. There is generally a crown of wide leaf blades which in wild species are often variegated with silver and green coloration. The inflorescence bears unisexual flowers in a spadix, with a short zone of female flowers near the base and a wider zone of male flowers nearer the tip. The fruit is a fleshy berry that ripens red. The fruit is a thin layer covering one large seed.

Plants of the genus are native to humid, shady tropical forest habitat.

== Cultivation and uses ==
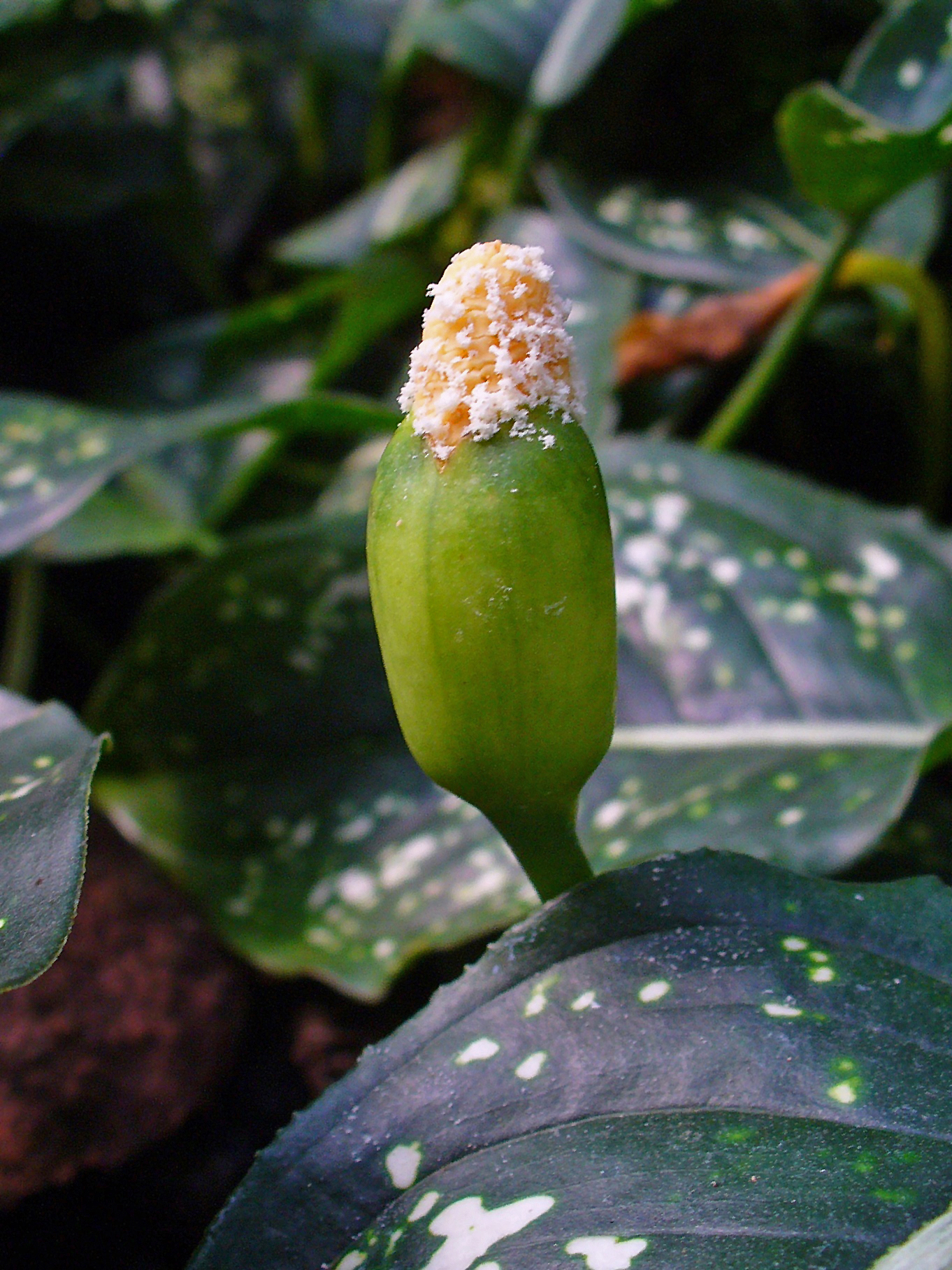
Aglaonema costatum

Aglaonema have been grown as luck-bringing ornamental plants in Asia for centuries. They were introduced to the West in 1885, when they were first brought to the Royal Botanic Gardens, Kew. They have been cultivated, hybridized, and bred into a wide array of cultivars. They live in low-light conditions and are popular houseplants.

This mainly tropical genus is known for its intolerance of cold temperatures. Chilling injury can begin at 15 °C (59 °F). The injury manifests in dark, greasy-looking patches on the foliage.

Cultivars have been selected for their shape and size, and especially for the color and pattern of the leaves. Many have white or cream-colored stems. Some have also been developed to tolerate colder temperatures. The most common cultivar is 'Silver Queen', which has gained the Royal Horticultural Society's Award of Garden Merit.

Most propagation of Aglaonema is done with cuttings and by dividing the basal shoots. Care of the houseplant involves protecting it from cold temperatures and excessive sunlight and removing any inflorescences that develop, which can prolong the life of the plant. It requires moist soil, and while some cultivars require a small amount of fertilizer, plants are easily injured when oversupplemented. Aglaonema are prone to false mites (Brevipalpus californicus). They may also acquire populations of nematodes, such as root-knot nematodes and Pratylenchus species, which cause root lesions. Pathogens include the fungus Myrothecium roridum and bacteria such as Pseudomonas cichorii, Erwinia chrysanthemi, and Xanthomonas campestris, which can all cause leaf spot. Colletotrichum fungi can cause anthracnose.

The NASA Clean Air Study determined that the species modestum of this plant genus was effective at removing common household air toxins formaldehyde and benzene.

Aglaonema plants are poisonous due to calcium oxalate crystals. If ingested they cause irritation of the mucous membranes, and the juice can cause skin irritation and painful rash.

== Diversity ==
Species include:

- Aglaonema brevispathum – Indochina
- Aglaonema chermsiriwattanae – Thailand
- Aglaonema cochinchense – Vietnam, Cambodia, Thailand, Malaysia
- Aglaonema commutatum – Philippines, Sulawesi; naturalized in West Indies
- Aglaonema cordifolium – Mindanao
- Aglaonema costatum – Fox's aglaonema, spotted evergreen – Pulau Langkawi, Indochina
- Aglaonema densinervium – Philippines, Sulawesi
- Aglaonema flemingianum – Terengganu
- Aglaonema hookerianum – Darjiling, Assam, Bangladesh, Bhutan, Myanmar
- Aglaonema marantifolium – Maluku, New Guinea
- Aglaonema modestum – Japanese-leaf – Bangladesh, Indochina, southern China
- Aglaonema nebulosum – Borneo, Malaysia, Sumatra
- Aglaonema nitidum – Borneo, Malaysia, Sumatra, Java, Indochina
- Aglaonema ovatum – Laos, Thailand, Vietnam
- Aglaonema philippinense – Philippines, Sulawesi
- Aglaonema pictum – Nias, Sumatra
- Aglaonema pumilum – Myanmar, Thailand
- Aglaonema roebelinii – Luzon
- Aglaonema rotundum – Sumatra
- Aglaonema simplex – Malayan-sword – Yunnan, Indochina, Malaysia, Indonesia, Philippines
- Aglaonema tricolor – Philippines
- Aglaonema vittatum – Sumatra, Lingga Islands
