= Carrion insects =

Insects associated with decomposing remains

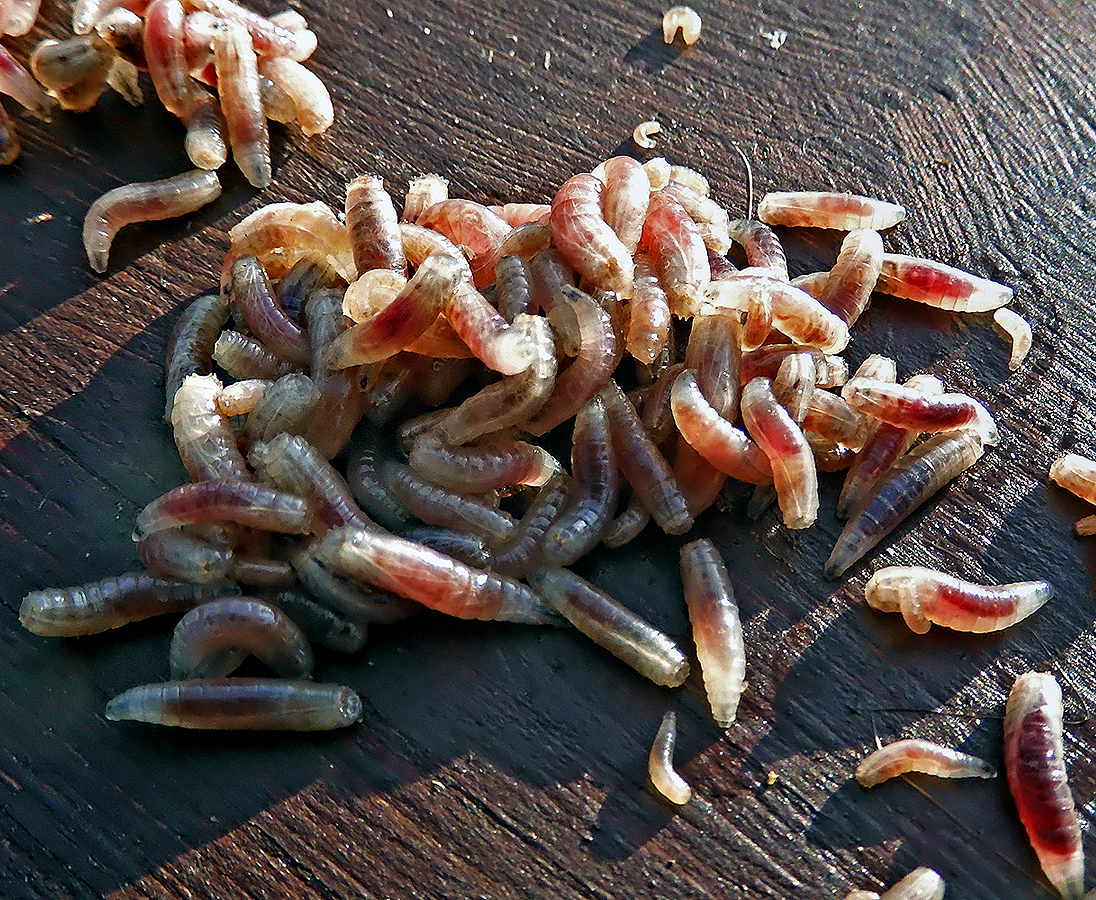
Carrion insects from a rabbit.

Carrion insects on dead vole, including greenbottle flies, flesh fly, rove beetle, dermestes beetle and American carrion beetle

Carrion insects (also known as necrophilous insects) are insects associated with decomposing remains. The processes of decomposition begin within a few minutes of death. Decomposing remains offer a temporary, changing site of concentrated resources which are exploited by a wide range of organisms, of which arthropods are often the first to arrive and the predominant exploitive group. However, not all arthropods found on or near decomposing remains will have an active role in the decay process.

== Ecological roles ==
Carrion insects are commonly described based on their ecological role. Four commonly described roles are:

1. Necrophagous species
2. Predators and parasites of necrophagous species
3. Omnivorous species
4. Adventive species

=== Necrophagous species ===
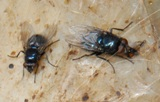
Necrophagous Protophormia terraenovae (Robineau-Desvoidy).

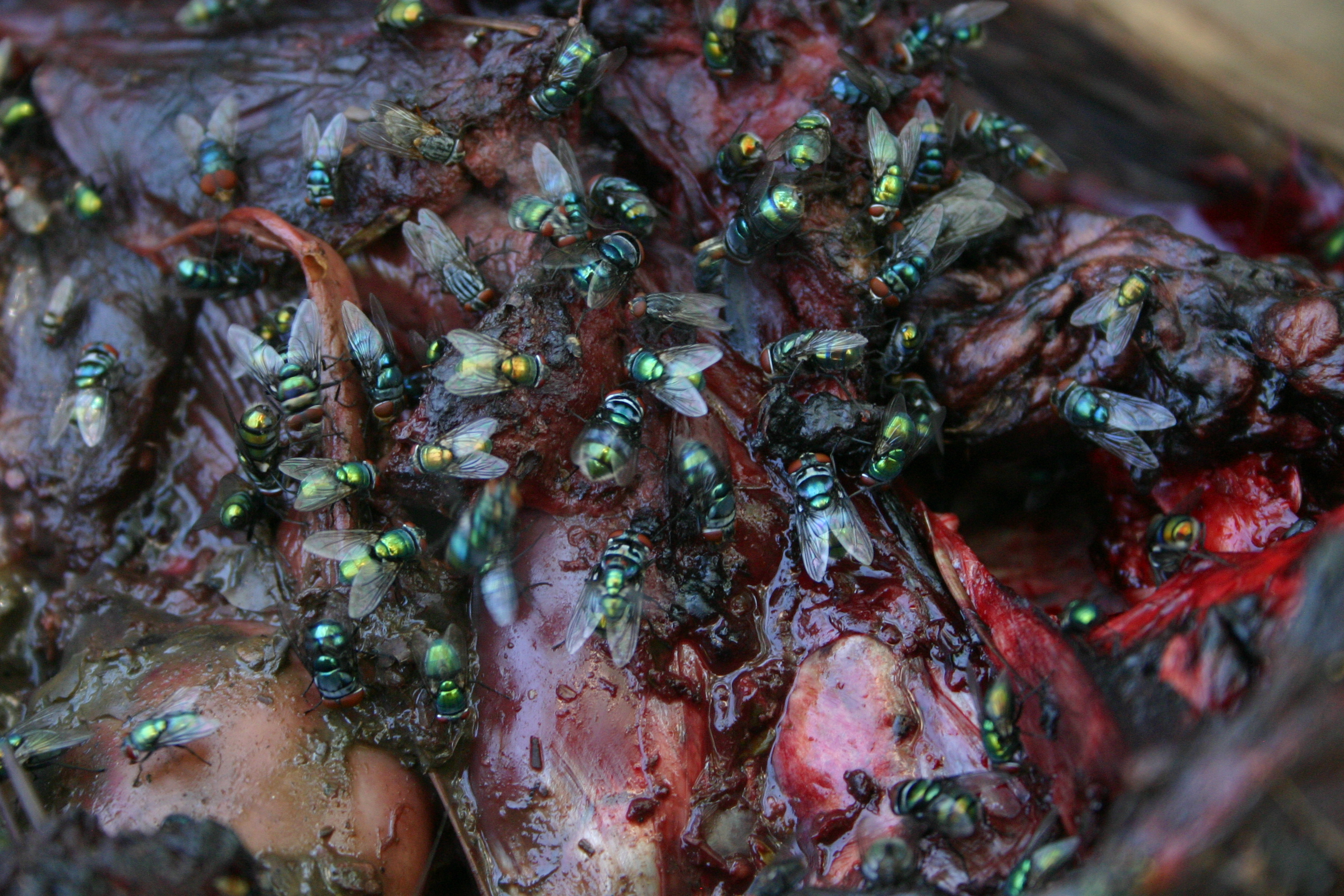
Calliphoridae, Sarcophagidae and Muscidae on fresh porcupine corpse

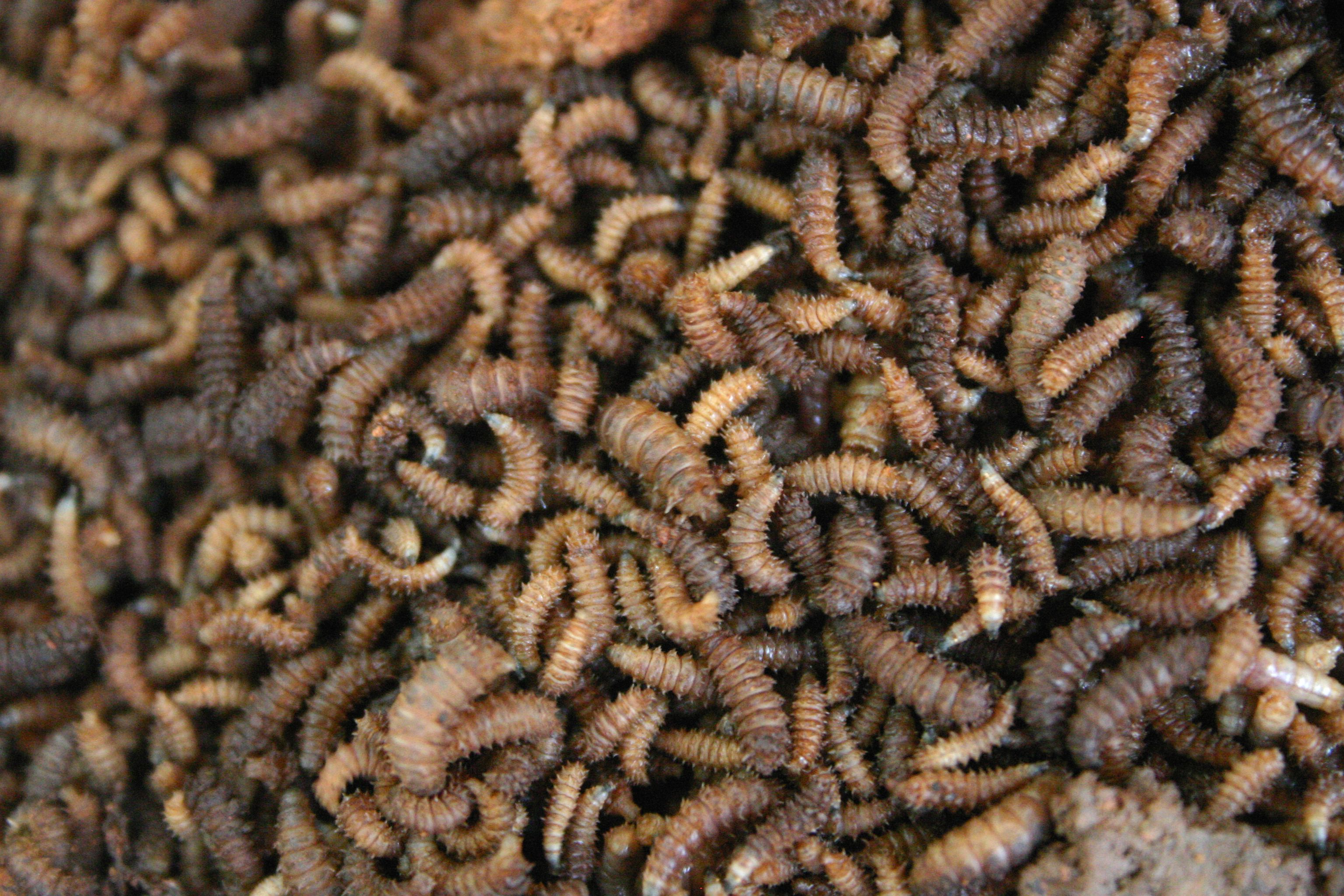
Larvae of blowflies and flies on 5-day old porcupine corpse

Necrophagous species are insects/arthropods that feed directly on remains, or the fluids released from remains during the decomposition process. This ecological classification includes many species of the order Diptera (true flies) from the families Calliphoridae (blowflies) and Sarcophagidae (flesh flies), and some species of the order Coleoptera (beetles). Although specific arthropod species present at remains will vary by geographic location, some examples of common blowflies are Calliphora vicina, Phormia regina, Protophormia terraenovae and Lucilia sericata

Necrophagous blowfly species are often the first to arrive and colonize at a site of decomposing remains. These species develop from eggs laid directly on the carcass and complete their life cycle on or near the remains. Because of this, necrophagous species are considered to be the most important for post-mortem interval estimations. The initial colonizers of greatest importance are those of the family Calliphoridae, Sarcophagidae and Muscidae (house flies), as these are typically the first insects to lay eggs at remains.

The fresh stage of decomposition is characterized by the arrival of necrophagous blowflies and flesh flies. These blowflies are also strongly attracted during the bloat stage of decomposition. Many Dipterans, especially their larval forms, are involved in removal of material from the carcass, though not in an appreciable amount. Necrophagous species of Coleoptera are most strongly attracted during the active stage of decomposition.

=== Predators and parasites of necrophagous species ===
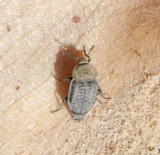
Thanatophilus lapponicus (Herbst), Family Silphidae.

This role includes those insects which feed on, or act as parasites of, necrophagous species. These insects do not feed directly on the decomposing remains or its fluids, but are considered to be the second most forensically important ecological role. Predators of necrophagous insects include species from the Coleoptera families Silphidae (carrion beetles) and Staphylinidae (rove beetles). Parasites may include species of parasitic wasps, from the order Hymenoptera (family Braconidae).

Some species of blowflies may begin their larval development in the necrophagous role, feeding directly on remains, but become predaceous during later larval stages. These species are listed as being schizophagous, and are included in the predators and parasites ecological role.

The majority of beetles present at remains are there as predators of blowfly larvae, and are not directly concerned with the removal of carcass materials. Predaceous beetles may arrive at a site of remains as early as the bloat stage of decomposition, when there is a strong attraction of their necrophagous prey. Some of these species may also remain during active decay. During the advanced stage of decay there is an increase in those insects which are predaceous and/or parasitic on necrophagous beetles.

=== Omnivorous species ===
Omnivorous species feed on both the decomposing remains as well as other carrion-associated insects, usually necrophagous species. Large numbers of omnivorous insects can slow the rate at which carcass materials are removed by depleting the number of necrophagous larvae. This category includes species of ants, wasps, and some species of carrion beetles.

=== Adventive species ===
Adventive species may or may not play a significant role in the decomposition of remains. Arthropods in this ecological role are not necessarily attracted to decaying remains, but use it as an extension of their natural habitats. Adventive species originate within the vegetation and soils surrounding decomposing remains. These insects may visit remains from time to time, or use them for concealment, but their presence can only be accounted for by chance. They may also become predators of necrophagous species found at remains. Adventive species include springtails, centipedes and spiders.

The diagram below shows the relationship between each ecological role and a site of decaying remains.

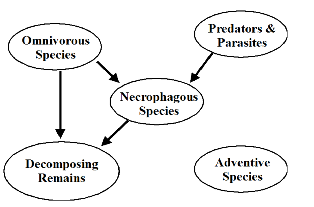
Trophic level relationships between ecological roles of carrion insects. Image adapted from Smith (1986).

== Condensed ecological roles ==
The ecological roles described above can further be condensed into two broad, general classifications:

1. Properly cadaveric entomofauna
2. Arbitrary entomofauna of a cadaver

=== Properly cadaveric entomofauna ===
This classification consists of necrobiont insects which use decaying remains as a permanent environment necessary for their life and development. Necrobiont insects includes necrophagous and entomophagous trophic specializations, or necrophagous, predaceous/parasitic and omnivorous species.

=== Arbitrary entomofauna of a cadaver ===
Some insects or arthropods visit sites of carrion, but do not colonize them. This classification consists of those insects for which decomposing remains are not a permanent feature for development. The adventive trophic specialization falls into this category.

== Forensic relevance ==
Each group or species of insect will be attracted to decomposing remains at different stages of decomposition, as changes within the remains result in the availability of different resources. The predictable order in which the above described insect groups are attracted to and observed on remains is referred to as a succession pattern, and can be used in forensic investigations to estimate the post-mortem interval (PMI) or time since death. This method of PMI estimation is most useful in the later stages of decomposition.

A second method of PMI determination, in early stages of decomposition, by insect evidence utilizes the development rate of colonizing arthropods. This method is usually applied to necrophagous blowflies, as they are often the first to colonize and are associated with remains for the longest period. Development rates are only useful in forensic investigations until the first new generation has completed development and left the remains.
