= Three to Get Deadly =

1997 novel by Janet Evanovich

- First edition
- Author: Janet Evanovich
- Language: English
- Series: Stephanie Plum
- Genre: Crime novel
- Publisher: St. Martin's Press
- Publication date: February 14, 1997
- Publication place: United States
- Media type: Print (Hardcover, Paperback)
- Pages: 304 pp
- ISBN: 0-684-82265-2
- OCLC: 35280874
- Dewey Decimal: 813/.54 20
- LC Class: PS3555.V2126 T48 1997
- Preceded by: Two for the Dough
- Followed by: Four to Score

Three to Get Deadly is the third novel by Janet Evanovich featuring the bounty hunter Stephanie Plum and was first published in 1997. It won the 1998 Dilys Award.

== Plot introduction ==
Stephanie Plum is a streetwise Jersey Girl who ended up as a bounty hunter by chance (and family connections). When a kind, old candy store owner (Uncle Mo) goes FTA (failure to appear) after being arrested for carrying a concealed weapon, Stephanie reluctantly agrees to go after him.

== Explanation of the novel's title ==
The title comes from the saying "One for the money, two for the show, three to get ready, and four to GO!"

== Plot summary ==
Stephanie is on the trail of beloved Moses Bedemier, a mild-mannered man who runs an ice-cream parlor/candy store in the Burg. Mo is an upstanding citizen with ties to almost every family in Trenton. He gets ticketed by an overly-excited, fresh-out-of-the-academy cop for carrying a concealed weapon, and then fails to appear for his court date. No one wants to help Stephanie haul "Uncle Mo" (as he is widely known) to jail, so her apprehension work is frustratingly slow. "Mo would never do anything wrong," is the standard refrain from all the Burg's residents when Stephanie questions them.

Since her neighbors and family refuse to help her, she calls on her mentor Ranger, her sidekick (and aspiring bounty hunter) Lula, and Joe Morelli, vice cop and former lover. As she investigates, Stephanie confides to Morelli that something feels wrong about Mo - everyone loves him for his profession, but no one seems to know anything about his private life, and a concealed weapons charge is not serious enough for him to go on the run.

Lula's friend Jackie, still working as a prostitute on Stark Street, asks Stephanie to help her find her worthless boyfriend, who disappeared with Jackie's almost-new car. A short while later, they find the man's body under the car, shot dead. Even more strange, while snooping through the basement of Mo's ice cream shop, Stephanie finds four dead bodies buried in the dirt, all drug dealers. Stephanie suspects that mild-mannered Mo has become a vigilante.

This suspicion soon circulates around the Burg, and, far from being upset, most of the residents decide Mo is a hero and still refuse to help Stephanie find him. Worse, men in masks are following her around, threatening to kill her if she keeps looking for Mo.

It is Stephanie's slimy cousin Vinnie who provides the final clue. Vinnie had already told her that Mo was secretly homosexual, but she has a theory about his connection with the drug dealers, and Vinnie's investigation confirms it: Mo, under an alias, is actually a renowned director and producer of underground BDSM films. He owns a small rural house outside Trenton under that alias, where he shoots most of his movies.

Stephanie, Lula, and Ranger confront Mo at the house, where he is hiding out. He confesses that one of the drug dealers "procured" young men and women (i.e., drug addicts desperate for money) to perform in Mo's movies, but crossed the line when he asked permission to sell drugs outside Mo's store. Mo pretended to agree, but suggested a "sting operation" to a local church reverend, who embraced the idea. However, Mo did not plan on the scheme "snowballing", and now the reverend and several members of his congregation have become a death squad, privately "cleaning up the streets" of Trenton. Mo was prepared to testify to the authorities, but the vigilantes are now hunting him along with the drug dealers.

Just then, the death squad pulls up outside the house and attacks with heavy weapons, including a rocket launcher that blows up Stephanie's pickup truck. Ranger hunkers down in the house, while telling Stephanie and Lula to take Mo to safety. Stephanie tells Lula to drive away with Mo, then draws her gun to help Ranger, but Morelli and the police arrive with reinforcements before anyone is killed or seriously wounded. The vigilantes are apprehended, and Stephanie returns Mo to court.

As Stephanie attempts to resume her relationship with Morelli, they are constantly interrupted - first by criminals, then by Stephanie's accidental dye job that makes her look like Ronald McDonald.

=== Car Death ===
- Stephanie's Baby Nissan Pickup, shot by a rocket launcher
- Ranger's BMW stolen and later returned

=== Failure-to-Appear (FTA) assignments ===
- Moses "Uncle Mo" Bedemier: Carrying Concealed
- Stuart Baggett: Shooting up 14 unoccupied cars (including two police cars)

== Trivia ==
- Jackie, Lula's friend, first appeared in One for the Money.

== Development ==
Janet Evanovich started the Stephanie Plum series after writing a series of romance novels. She wrote Stephanie based on people she knew, including her daughter Alex (and herself). The mystery genre appealed to her as a way to include humor, romance and adventure in her work.

== Publication Order of Stephanie Plum Books ==
- Evanovich, Janet (1995), One for the Money
- Evanovich, Janet (1996), Two for the Dough
- Evanovich, Janet (1997). Three to Get Deadly
- Evanovich, Janet (1998). Four to Score
- Evanovich, Janet (1999). High Five
- Evanovich, Janet (2000). Hot Six
- Evanovich, Janet (2001). Seven Up
- Evanovich, Janet (2002). Hard Eight
- Evanovich, Janet (2003). Visions of Sugar Plums. A short Christmas special.
- Evanovich, Janet (2003). To the Nines
- Evanovich, Janet (2004). Ten Big Ones
- Evanovich, Janet (2005). Eleven on Top
- Evanovich, Janet (2006). Twelve Sharp
- Evanovich, Janet (2007). Plum Lovin'.
- Evanovich, Janet (2007). Lean Mean Thirteen
- Evanovich, Janet (2008). Plum Lucky.
- Evanovich, Janet (2008). Fearless Fourteen.
- Evanovich, Janet (2009). Plum Spooky.
- Evanovich, Janet (2009). Finger Lickin' Fifteen
- Evanovich, Janet (2010). Sizzling Sixteen
- Evanovich, Janet (2011). Smokin' Seventeen
- Evanovich, Janet (2011). Explosive Eighteen
- Evanovich, Janet (2012). Notorious Nineteen
- Evanovich, Janet (2013). Takedown Twenty
- Evanovich, Janet (2014). Top Secret Twenty-One
- Evanovich, Janet (2015). Tricky Twenty-Two
- Evanovich, Janet (2016). Turbo Twenty-Three
- Evanovich, Janet (2017). Hardcore Twenty-Four
- Evanovich, Janet (2018). Look Alive Twenty-Five
- Evanovich, Janet (2019). Twisted Twenty-Six
- Evanovich, Janet (2020). Fortune and Glory
- Evanovich, Janet (2021). Game On
- Evanovich, Janet (2022). Going Rogue
- Evanovich, Janet (2023). Dirty Thirty
- Evanovich, Janet (2024). Now or Never

== Critical reception ==
Publishers Weekly called the character of Stephanie Plum 'redoubtable' and said she was 'crying out for a screen debut.'

== Awards and nominations ==
Three to Get Deadly won the 1998 Dilys Award presented by the Independent Mystery Booksellers Association.
