= Two for the Dough =

1996 novel by Janet Evanovich

- First edition
- Author: Janet Evanovich
- Language: English
- Series: Stephanie Plum
- Genre: Crime
- Publisher: St. Martin's Press
- Publication date: January 10, 1996
- Publication place: United States
- Media type: Print (Hardcover, Paperback)
- Pages: 304 pp
- ISBN: 0-684-19638-7
- OCLC: 32893459
- Dewey Decimal: 813/.54 20
- LC Class: PS3555.V2126 T96 1996
- Preceded by: One for the Money
- Followed by: Three to Get Deadly

Two for the Dough, published in 1996, is the second novel by Janet Evanovich featuring the bounty hunter Stephanie Plum. Like others in the Stephanie Plum series, Two for the Dough was a best-seller, spending 36 weeks on the Top 150 list.

== Plot introduction ==
Stephanie Plum is still an inexperienced bounty hunter, so her boss and cousin Vinnie gives her an easy case: apprehend local boy Kenny Mancuso, accused of shooting his best friend in the knee and then jumping bail. Because Kenny is the black sheep cousin of vice cop Joe Morelli, Morelli is on Kenny's trail as well. There's also a case of 24 missing caskets competing for Stephanie's time.

== Plot summary ==
While Stephanie is looking for Kenny around their Trenton neighborhood, the friend he shot - Moogey Bues - is shot again. This second attack is fatal, which complicates the case against Kenny. At the same time, Stephanie is approached by Spiro Stiva, the stepson of the owner of the local funeral home, who wants to hire her as a private investigator. Spiro purchased twenty-four bargain basement coffins, but they have mysteriously gone missing. Spiro has not reported the loss to the police, out of fear that his stepfather, who is convalescing in the hospital, will find out.

Morelli, who is also looking for Kenny, warns her that something is suspicious about Spiro's offer; any legitimate person would have filed a police report, plus the fact that Spiro, Kenny, and Moogey were best friends in high school.

As the book continues, Stephanie begins receiving embalmed body parts in her apartment along with threatening notes. When she refuses to stop investigating, Kenny attacks her Grandma Mazur on the street, stabbing her through the hand with an icepick, though without doing permanent damage.

Morelli confides to Stephanie that a large shipment of military-grade weapons - armor-piercing bullets, LAWs, and brand-new assault rifles and pistols - went missing from Fort Braddock, and several reappeared on the streets in Philadelphia and around New Jersey. Kenny, who was discharged from the U.S. Army two months ago, had access to the weapons depot, and the gun he used to shoot Moogey also belonged to the missing inventory. Morelli believes that Kenny, Spiro and Moogey stole the guns and were selling them, though he doesn't know who killed Moogey or why.

Eventually, Stephanie and Grandma Mazur find themselves locked in the basement of Stiva's Funeral Home when Spiro and Kenny confront each other. It turns out that an associate of Kenny's, an auto mechanic named Sandeman, overheard enough to figure out what Kenny and Spiro were up to. He killed Moogey and stole the guns, which were hidden in Spiro's caskets. Kenny, believing that Spiro had double-crossed him, went on a rampage, sending body parts and threats to Spiro as well as Stephanie, before tracking down Sandeman and the guns, now hidden in the basement of the Funeral Home. They just have to kill Stephanie and Grandma Mazur to cover their tracks.

However, Spiro and Kenny both underestimated Grandma Mazur. When they open the locked room, Grandma pulls a pistol from her handbag and opens fire, inadvertently hitting one of the caskets and causing an explosion that burns down the funeral home. Stephanie and Grandma Mazur both manage to escape, and Kenny staggers out a moment later, though there is no sign of Spiro. In a rage, Stephanie subdues Kenny - with some help from Morelli - and takes him to jail.

Lula, the prostitute introduced in the previous book, One For the Money, gets a job as a file clerk at Vinnie's Bail Bonds company. She often joins Stephanie as her sidekick in addition to her filing duties.

=== Failure-to-Appear (FTA) assignments ===
- Kenny Mancuso: Shooting his best friend in the knee
- Eugene Petras: Domestic Violence

== Critical reception ==
Two for the Dough is recommended for its "sharp repartee" and for Plum's "cynical but still fond" relationships with her family and her home community.

== Publication order of Stephanie Plum books ==
- Evanovich, Janet (1995), One for the Money
- Evanovich, Janet (1996), Two for the Dough
- Evanovich, Janet (1997). Three to Get Deadly
- Evanovich, Janet (1998). Four to Score
- Evanovich, Janet (1999). High Five
- Evanovich, Janet (2000). Hot Six
- Evanovich, Janet (2001). Seven Up
- Evanovich, Janet (2002). Hard Eight
- Evanovich, Janet (2003). Visions of Sugar Plums. A short Christmas special.
- Evanovich, Janet (2003). To the Nines
- Evanovich, Janet (2004). Ten Big Ones
- Evanovich, Janet (2005). Eleven on Top
- Evanovich, Janet (2006). Twelve Sharp
- Evanovich, Janet (2007). Plum Lovin'.
- Evanovich, Janet (2007). Lean Mean Thirteen
- Evanovich, Janet (2008). Plum Lucky.
- Evanovich, Janet (2008). Fearless Fourteen.
- Evanovich, Janet (2009). Plum Spooky.
- Evanovich, Janet (2009). Finger Lickin' Fifteen
- Evanovich, Janet (2010). Sizzling Sixteen
- Evanovich, Janet (2011). Smokin' Seventeen
- Evanovich, Janet (2011). Explosive Eighteen
- Evanovich, Janet (2012). Notorious Nineteen
- Evanovich, Janet (2013). Takedown Twenty
- Evanovich, Janet (2014). Top Secret Twenty-One
- Evanovich, Janet (2015). Tricky Twenty-Two
- Evanovich, Janet (2016). Turbo Twenty-Three
- Evanovich, Janet (2017). Hardcore Twenty-Four
- Evanovich, Janet (2018). Look Alive Twenty-Five
- Evanovich, Janet (2019). Twisted Twenty-Six
- Evanovich, Janet (2020). Fortune and Glory
- Evanovich, Janet (2021). Game On
- Evanovich, Janet (2022). Going Rogue
- Evanovich, Janet (2023). Dirty Thirty
- Evanovich, Janet (2024). Now or Never
