= Publishers Weekly list of bestselling novels in the United States in the 2000s =

This is a list of bestselling novels in the United States in the 2000s (decade), as determined by Publishers Weekly. The list features the most popular novels of each year from 2000 through 2009.

The books in the Harry Potter series are excluded "because of the way AAP [Assoc of American Publishers] measures industry sales. The organization takes actual sales from 81 reporting companies (including Potter publisher Scholastic) and then uses Census Bureau data to extrapolate sales for the entire industry. In the past, the inclusion of Potter novels has distorted growth (and, in non-Potter years, the decline) of the children's category."

== 2000 ==
1. The Brethren by John Grisham
2. The Mark: The Beast Rules the World by Jerry B. Jenkins and Tim LaHaye
3. The Bear and the Dragon by Tom Clancy
4. The Indwelling: The Beast Takes Possession by Jerry B. Jenkins and Tim LaHaye
5. The Last Precinct by Patricia Cornwell
6. Journey by Danielle Steel
7. The Rescue by Nicholas Sparks
8. Roses Are Red by James Patterson
9. Cradle and All by James Patterson
10. Angels and Demons by Dan Brown

== 2001 ==
1. Desecration by Jerry B. Jenkins and Tim LaHaye
2. Skipping Christmas by John Grisham
3. A Painted House by John Grisham
4. Dreamcatcher by Stephen King
5. The Corrections by Jonathan Franzen
6. Black House by Stephen King and Peter Straub
7. The Kiss by Danielle Steel
8. Valhalla Rising by Clive Cussler
9. A Day Late and a Dollar Short by Terry McMillan
10. Violets Are Blue by James Patterson

== 2002 ==
1. The Summons by John Grisham
2. Red Rabbit by Tom Clancy
3. The Remnant by Jerry B. Jenkins and Tim LaHaye
4. The Lovely Bones by Alice Sebold
5. Prey by Michael Crichton
6. Skipping Christmas by John Grisham
7. The Shelters of Stone by Jean M. Auel
8. Four Blind Mice by James Patterson
9. Everything's Eventual: 14 Dark Tales by Stephen King
10. The Nanny Diaries by Emma McLaughlin and Nicola Kraus

== 2003 ==
1. The Da Vinci Code by Dan Brown
2. The Five People You Meet in Heaven by Mitch Albom
3. The King of Torts by John Grisham
4. Bleachers by John Grisham
5. Armageddon by Tim LaHaye and Jerry B. Jenkins
6. The Teeth of the Tiger by Tom Clancy
7. The Big Bad Wolf by James Patterson
8. Blow Fly by Patricia Cornwell
9. The Lovely Bones by Alice Sebold
10. The Wedding by Nicholas Sparks

== 2004 ==
1. The Da Vinci Code by Dan Brown
2. The Five People You Meet in Heaven by Mitch Albom
3. The Last Juror by John Grisham
4. Glorious Appearing by Jerry B. Jenkins and Tim LaHaye
5. Angels & Demons by Dan Brown
6. State of Fear by Michael Crichton
7. London Bridges by James Patterson
8. Trace by Patricia Cornwell
9. The Rule of Four by Ian Caldwell and Dustin Thomason
10. The Da Vinci Code: Special Illustrated Collector's Edition by Dan Brown

== 2005 ==
1. The Broker by John Grisham
2. The Da Vinci Code by Dan Brown
3. Mary, Mary by James Patterson
4. At First Sight by Nicholas Sparks
5. Predator by Patricia Cornwell
6. True Believer by Nicholas Sparks
7. Light from Heaven by Jan Karon
8. The Historian by Elizabeth Kostova
9. The Mermaid Chair by Sue Monk Kidd
10. Eleven on Top by Janet Evanovich

== 2006 ==
1. For One More Day by Mitch Albom
2. Cross by James Patterson
3. Dear John by Nicholas Sparks
4. Next by Michael Crichton
5. Hannibal Rising by Thomas Harris
6. Lisey's Story by Stephen King
7. Twelve Sharp by Janet Evanovich
8. Cell by Stephen King
9. Beach Road by James Patterson and Peter de Jonge
10. The 5th Horseman by James Patterson and Maxine Paetro

== 2007 ==
1. A Thousand Splendid Suns by Khaled Hosseini
2. Playing For Pizza by John Grisham
3. Double Cross by James Patterson
4. The Choice by Nicholas Sparks
5. Lean Mean Thirteen by Janet Evanovich
6. Plum Lovin' by Janet Evanovich
7. Book of the Dead by Patricia Cornwell
8. The Quickie by James Patterson and Michael Ledwidge
9. The 6th Target by James Patterson and Maxine Paetro
10. The Darkest Evening of the Year by Dean Koontz

== 2008 ==
1. The Appeal by John Grisham
2. The Story of Edgar Sawtelle by David Wroblewski
3. The Host by Stephenie Meyer
4. Cross Country by James Patterson
5. The Lucky One by Nicholas Sparks
6. Fearless Fourteen by Janet Evanovich
7. Christmas Sweater by Glenn Beck
8. Scarpetta by Patricia Cornwell
9. Your Heart Belongs to Me by Dean Koontz
10. Plum Lucky by Janet Evanovich

== 2009 ==
1. The Lost Symbol by Dan Brown
2. The Associate by John Grisham
3. The Help by Kathryn Stockett
4. I, Alex Cross by James Patterson
5. The Last Song by Nicholas Sparks
6. Ford County by John Grisham
7. Finger Lickin' Fifteen by Janet Evanovich
8. The Host by Stephenie Meyer
9. Under the Dome by Stephen King
10. Pirate Latitudes by Michael Crichton
