= Visions of Sugar Plums =

2003 novella by Janet Evanovich

- First edition
- Author: Janet Evanovich
- Language: English
- Series: Stephanie Plum
- Genre: Crime novel
- Publisher: St. Martin's Press
- Publication date: 2003
- Publication place: United States
- Media type: Print (Hardcover)
- Preceded by: Hard Eight
- Followed by: To the Nines / Plum Lovin'

Visions of Sugar Plums is a 2003 novella by Janet Evanovich. It is the first of four "Between the Numbers" volumes in Evanovich's Stephanie Plum series, featuring the adventures of the eponymous bounty hunter in Trenton, New Jersey. Unlike the primary novels of the series, its title is based on a holiday rather than a number. It is followed by the novellas Plum Lovin' and Plum Lucky, and the full-length novel Plum Spooky.

The novella introduces the character of Diesel, who appears in all the subsequent "Between the Numbers" novels and was subsequently made the protagonist of Evanovich's Wicked spin-off series.
