= One for the Money (film) =

2012 film by Julie Anne Robinson

- Theatrical release poster
- Directed by: Julie Anne Robinson
- Screenplay by: Liz Brixius; Stacy Sherman; Karen Ray
- Based on: One for the Money by Janet Evanovich
- Produced by: Sidney Kimmel; Wendy Finerman; Tom Rosenberg; Gary Lucchesi
- Starring: Katherine Heigl; Jason O'Mara; Daniel Sunjata; John Leguizamo; Sherri Shepherd; Debbie Reynolds
- Cinematography: Jim Whitaker
- Edited by: Lisa Zeno Churgin
- Music by: Deborah Lurie
- Production companies: Lakeshore Entertainment; Sidney Kimmel Entertainment; Wendy Finerman Productions
- Distributed by: Lionsgate
- Release date: January 27, 2012
- Running time: 91 minutes
- Country: United States
- Language: English
- Budget: $40 million
- Box office: $38.1 million

One for the Money is a 2012 American crime comedy film based on Janet Evanovich's 1994 novel of the same name. Directed by Julie Anne Robinson, the screenplay was written by Liz Brixius, Karen McCullah Lutz, and Kirsten Smith. It stars Katherine Heigl, Jason O'Mara, Debbie Reynolds, John Leguizamo, Daniel Sunjata and Sherri Shepherd. The story revolves around Stephanie Plum, a broke and unemployed woman becoming a bail enforcement agent, going after a former high school crush who both skipped out on his payments and is a murder suspect.

The film was in development hell after Columbia and TriStar Pictures had purchased the novel's adaptation rights in 1997. In April 2010, Lionsgate acquired the distribution rights. Produced by Lakeshore and Sidney Kimmel Entertainment, principal photography took place in the Ambridge borough in Beaver County, Pennsylvania. This film was the last theatrical appearance of Debbie Reynolds before her death on December 28, 2016.

One for the Money was theatrically released in the United States on January 27, 2012 and was both a critical and commercial failure. The film was panned by critics, with many criticizing the script and Heigl's performance, and grossed just $38.1 million worldwide against a $40 million budget.

== Plot ==
In the Chambersburg neighborhood of Trenton, New Jersey, Stephanie Plum is divorced and unemployed. Seeking a job at her cousin Vinnie's bail bonds business, she blackmails him into letting her become a bail enforcement agent and tracks down fugitive Joe Morelli, her high school ex-boyfriend who has skipped his $500,000 bail. Morelli escapes the inexperienced Stephanie, who turns to veteran bounty hunter Ricardo "Ranger" Manoso for help. Explaining that Morelli, a vice detective, is wanted for the murder of heroin dealer Ziggy Kulesza, Ranger buys Stephanie a gun.

Police officer Eddie Gazarra, Stephanie's friend, informs her that Morelli shot Ziggy at the apartment of prostitute Carmen Sanchez. Morelli claimed to act in self-defense, but no evidence could be found that Ziggy had a gun, and Carmen and another man at the apartment have disappeared. Stephanie befriends a prostitute named Lula, who points her to a boxing gym where she questions cage fighter Benito Ramirez, Carmen's boyfriend, and his manager Jimmy Alpha. Before Ramirez can assault her, she is rescued by Morelli, who reveals that Carmen was his informant and suspects Ramirez is responsible for her disappearance.

Stephanie receives a threatening call from Ramirez, and commandeers Morelli's car after searching his apartment. Desperate for money, she recovers her first fugitive, delivering her nudist neighbor to the police for failure to appear. In the shower, she is confronted by Morelli and left handcuffed and naked, forcing her to call Ranger for help. She visits Carmen's apartment and meets John Cho, a neighbor who witnessed the shooting. He explains that he knocked Morelli unconscious, after which a "flat-nosed guy" fled the apartment. After capturing another fugitive, who first steals her gun and shoots at Ranger, Stephanie learns that Cho has been killed.

She is tailed by Ramirez, who leaves Lula badly beaten outside Stephanie's apartment. Morelli asks for Stephanie's help in clearing his name, in exchange for sole credit and payment for his capture, and she agrees, allowing him to lay low at her apartment. Vinnie's regular recovery agent Morty Beyers arrives to take over Morelli's bounty, and steals the keys to Morelli's car, but is killed by a car bomb intended for Stephanie, and Carmen’s apartment building is fire-bombed. Wearing a wire so Morelli can track her movements from nearby, Stephanie spots the flat-nosed man at a butcher shop frequented by Ziggy. The man loads two barrels onto a truck, and Stephanie follows him and the butcher to a marina, where she and Morelli discover the butcher’s boat is being used to transport heroin.

Hearing gunshots, they find the flat-nosed man and the butcher shot dead in the truck, and Carmen's body in one of the barrels. They are attacked by Ramirez and subdue him, but are held at gunpoint by Jimmy Alpha. He admits that he, Ramirez, and Ziggy were selling heroin, and killed Carmen for informing on them to Morelli; at Carmen's apartment, Ziggy did try to kill Morelli, but the flat-nosed man fled with Ziggy's gun. Stephanie manages to shoot Jimmy dead, but locks Morelli in the truck and delivers him to the police, along with her covert recording of Jimmy's confession, which exonerates Morelli. She collects the $50,000 bounty for Morelli, who arrives at her door, and they rekindle their relationship.

== Cast ==
- Katherine Heigl as Stephanie Plum
- Jason O'Mara as Joseph "Joe" Morelli
- Daniel Sunjata as Ricardo "Ranger" Carlos Manoso
- John Leguizamo as Jimmy Alpha
- Sherri Shepherd as Lula
- Debbie Reynolds as Grandma Edna Mazur
- Debra Monk as Helen Mazur Plum
- Nate Mooney as Eddie Gazarra
- Adam Paul as Bernie Kuntz
- Fisher Stevens as Morty Beyers
- Ana Reeder as Connie Rossoli
- Patrick Fischler as Vinnie Plum
- Ryan Michelle Bathe as Jackie
- Leonardo Nam as John Cho
- Annie Parisse as Mary Lou
- Danny Mastrogiorgio as Lenny
- Gavin-Keith Umeh as Benito Ramirez
- Louis Mustillo as Frank Plum
- Joshua Elijah Reese as Cop
- Olga Merediz as Rosa Gomez
- Alexis Treadwell as Carmen Sanchez

== Production ==
In an October 2010 interview, author Janet Evanovich stated that TriStar Pictures had purchased the rights to her novel thirteen years previously, and the film had been in development hell since that time. When asked about the status of the film, Evanovich commented, "Hard to believe they've been sitting on this multi-million dollar franchise for all these years but go figure." In February 2010, Variety announced that Katherine Heigl had been cast to play Stephanie Plum. In April 2010, Lionsgate announced that they had acquired distribution rights, would co-produce with Sidney Kimmel Entertainment and Lakeshore Entertainment (which had acquired the rights from Columbia), and Julie Anne Robinson (The Last Song) would direct.

The film adaptation was produced by Tom Rosenberg for Lakeshore Entertainment, with Katherine Heigl playing the role of Stephanie Plum. The production was shot in metropolitan Pittsburgh from July to early September 2010. Principal photography began the week of July 12, 2010, in the borough of Ambridge in suburban Beaver County, and continued in six different locations in the town. Pittsburgh's Central Northside neighborhood as well as the recently shuttered UPMC facility in the inner suburb of Braddock, doubled for the book's setting of Trenton, New Jersey, neighborhoods and government buildings. Establishing shot of bridge overlooking Trenton, New Jersey was filmed in Kittanning.

The end credits showed, "In Fond Memory of Michael Dennison", because costume designer Dennison died from a brain aneurysm on September 2, 2010 during the film shoot in Pittsburgh, stunning the cast and crew of the film, which was preparing to wrap principal photography.

== Reception ==
=== Critical response ===
The film was not initially screened for critics and was widely panned. On the review aggregator website Rotten Tomatoes, 2% of 53 critics' reviews are positive, with an average rating of 3.2/10. The website's consensus reads: "Dull and unfunny, One for the Money wastes Katherine Heigl's talents on a stunningly generic comic thriller." Metacritic, which uses a weighted average, assigned the film a score of 22 out of 100, based on 17 critics, indicating "generally unfavorable" reviews. Audiences polled by CinemaScore gave the film an average grade of "B−" on an A+ to F scale. It was ranked number 46 in a Rotten Tomatoes editorial on the 100 worst movies of all time.

R. Kurt Osenlund of Slant Magazine criticized the cartoonish portrayal of New Jersey and its various caricatures, and the dumbed-down gender depiction of its main cast by an all-female production team, saying that, "This isn't girl-power filmmaking, this is cutesy contentment, a production team of gals enforcing their own stereotypes by willfully succumbing to demographic views of sexist Hollywood honchos." Sheri Linden of the Los Angeles Times noted the film's poor scripting of Heigl's character, story progression, and balancing both screwball and black comedy, calling it "an ungainly mix of flat-footed gumshoeing and strained attempts at hilarity, all delivered with an unconvincing Joizy vibe." Kimberley Jones of The Austin Chronicle said that the film's "glancing relationship with reality" involving its main heroine, story and setting doesn't translate well on the silver screen and is more suited as a made-for-TV movie, concluding with, "If the filmmakers can't be bothered to believe in the real-world implications of its premise, then why ever should we?" Mark Feeney of The Boston Globe gave credit to the supporting performances of Leonardo Nam and Debbie Reynolds for having "an out-of-left-field quality the rest of the movie lacks."

Frank Scheck of The Hollywood Reporter believed Heigl and the film's supporting cast were up to the task, but felt they were undone by a script unsure of its genre, saying that it "mostly resembles a failed television pilot, a feeling which is only reinforced by its late-January release and failure to be screened for critics." Jeff Otto from IndieWire repeated what Scheck wrote about the genre confusion, saying that it carries elements of a romantic comedy but "Otherwise [the film] dabbles in thriller territory, sort of an attempt at Elmore Leonard gone Jersey Shore. But it’s not smart enough for that." Feeney felt the film was having a genre battle with itself over "gritty-ethnic inner city vs. girly-girly comic", calling it "chick-lit [Elmore] Leonard." Entertainment Weekly's Owen Gleiberman added that if said "[Elmore] Leonard movie was scripted by a bad Nora Ephron imitator."

Many critics derided Heigl for her portrayal of Stephanie Plum. Sam Adams of The A.V. Club found her miscast as Stephanie because she lacked any spunk or tenacity to make the character tolerable and charming, despite some decent comedic timing, saying "there's a hollowness at the movie’s center, right where Heigl's heart should be." Andrew Barker from Variety wrote about Heigl having "an almost standoffish lack of conviction" in her performance, and Elizabeth Weitzman of the New York Daily News described her as being "too movie-star glam, [too] stiffly prissy, and [too] lacking in any affection for Stephanie herself." Gleiberman saw Heigl as being unsuitable to emulate the mannerisms of a guidette, saying that she portrays "working-class sexy slovenliness in an overly thought-out way." Rolling Stone's Peter Travers also noted Heigl's miscasting as part of a "cringingly false" film that's devoid of the "Evanovich talent and energy" throughout the direction and screenwriting, concluding that One for the Money is "so godawful there'll never be another Plum movie to rectify this mess. Evanovich deserved better."

Author Janet Evanovich was delighted with how the film turned out and did some joint interviews with Heigl to promote the film. Evanovich stated that she would now envision Heigl as Stephanie when writing the character. Complex placed the film at number five on its list of the 25 worst movies of 2012. Complex staff writer Matt Barone said, "[I]f the movie's only offense was how it soils the Garden State's reputation worse than JWoww, it'd be reprehensible, but not worthy of severe public humiliation. But considering that One for the Money is also about as funny as a colonic, there's nothing left to do but rip it apart before banishing the flick from our memory banks."

=== Box office ===
One for the Money was released on January 27, 2012 and debuted at number 3 behind The Grey and Underworld: Awakening with $11.5 million on its opening weekend. The film grossed $26,414,527 domestically and $10,479,194 globally to a total of $36,893,721 worldwide, below its $40 million budget. The film was promoted using discount ticket offers from Groupon. Exit polling indicated high audience awareness of the promotion, an estimated 11% bought tickets using Groupon, and 93% of that segment indicated they would not have attended the film otherwise. Box Office Mojo estimated that the "Groupon bump" amounted to around $1 million.

=== Awards ===
Heigl was nominated for a Golden Raspberry Award for Worst Actress for her performance in the film, but lost the award to Kristen Stewart for both Snow White and the Huntsman and The Twilight Saga: Breaking Dawn – Part 2.
