= Hard Eight =

A hard eight is a wager in the game of craps which ultimately wins by rolling two fours. It may also refer to:

- Hard Eight (film), a 1996 film directed by Paul Thomas Anderson
- Hard Eight (novel), a novel by Janet Evanovich in the Stephanie Plum series
