= Lean Mean Thirteen =

2007 novel by Janet Evanovich

- First edition
- Author: Janet Evanovich
- Language: English
- Series: Stephanie Plum
- Genre: Crime novel
- Publisher: St. Martin's Press
- Publication date: June 19, 2007
- Publication place: United States
- Media type: Print (Hardcover)
- Pages: 486 pp
- ISBN: 0-7393-2733-X
- OCLC: 104626191
- Preceded by: Plum Lovin'
- Followed by: Plum Lucky and Fearless Fourteen

Lean Mean Thirteen is a 2007 novel by Janet Evanovich, the thirteenth in the Stephanie Plum series. It was released on June 19, 2007.

The novel marks another thematic shift in the series; the first through seventh novels focus on Stephanie learning her trade as a bounty hunter, and the travails that come as she tries to apprehend a particular fugitive. The eighth through twelfth novels feature Stephanie coping with being stalked by criminals for various reasons; Lean Mean Thirteen, and several of the subsequent novels, focus on Stephanie getting caught up in the search for a missing person, in a manner related only peripherally, or not at all, to her work as a fugitive apprehension agent.

== Plot summary ==
Stephanie's path crosses again with that of her despised ex-husband, Richard "Dickie" Orr, while doing a favour for Ranger. When Dickie is later discovered missing from his apartment under some rather violent circumstances, Stephanie becomes the prime suspect in his apparent murder.

== Synopsis ==
On the pretext of seeking legal advice from Dickie, Stephanie drops by his office, hoping to plant a listening device on him. The meeting goes downhill when she notices a recent photo of him and her archenemy, Joyce Barnhardt (Stephanie divorced Dickie after catching him in flagrante with Joyce). Dickie makes the mistake of remembering his affair with Joyce as an amusing lark, and ends up on the floor of his office with Stephanie's hands around his throat, before her friends Connie and Lula pry her away. In a fit of indignation, Stephanie snatches a desk clock off Dickie's desk, declaring that it was a wedding present from her aunt.

Later that evening, Stephanie's on-again/off-again boyfriend, detective Joe Morelli, is told that Dickie has disappeared, and there are signs that he has been abducted or murdered from his house. Because of her earlier altercation with Dickie, Morelli tells Stephanie that she might be a suspect in his disappearance. Joyce Barnhardt has no trouble believing it, and reports Stephanie to both the Trenton police and the press. When she is questioned by the police, Stephanie is stunned to learn that Dickie never changed his will after their divorce, which means she will inherit everything.

Morelli tells Stephanie that he has to go underground on an assignment, and reluctantly suggests that she enlist Ranger's help with protection and in tracking Dickie down. Stephanie confronts Ranger, wanting to know why he wanted the bug planted. He explains that the brother of one of his employees, Ziggy Zabar, an accountant, prepared the taxes for Dickie's law firm, but disappeared. A few days later, Ziggy's dead body washes ashore, shot through the head.

While snooping through Joyce's house, Stephanie finds handwritten notes that lead her to an account in Dickie's name with Smith Barney that was recently emptied of $40 million. Following his trail around Trenton, Stephanie stumbles onto the bodies of two of Dickie's three partners, both of whom have been killed with a flamethrower. Both of the buildings in which the bodies are found have been rigged with bombs, forcing Stephanie and Ranger to make a hasty exit before they explode.

Joyce, convinced that Stephanie knows where Dickie or the $40 million is, follows her around, inveigling herself into a family dinner at the Plum home, and even saves her from a musclebound thug trying to kidnap her.

When she drops by Morelli's house to borrow some DVDs for Lula, Stephanie finds Dickie, alive and well, living there under protective custody. Morelli admits that Dickie turned himself in to the police a few days after his disappearance, and offered to testify against his partners, but that he only trusted Morelli to protect him. Dickie explains that he was recruited by the other three partners of the law firm - Roland Petiak, Victor Gorvich, and Peter Smullen - to be the "token real lawyer" in the firm, which was being used as a front for a sort of modern triangle trade: Petiak's men stole guns from military depots and Smullen traded the guns to several South American drug cartels, in exchange for drugs being sold on the streets of Trenton. Except for Dickie, all the partners' income came from illegal gun and drug sales, reported as attorney's fees on the firm's tax reports. Dickie swears that he didn't know about any of this until Ziggy Zabar disappeared, and the next day he overheard Petiak saying he had been eliminated. Dickie emptied the firm's Smith Barney account and was preparing to leave the country when Stephanie visited his office and unknowingly stole the key card to the account (hidden in the desk clock). When the partners came looking for their money, they sent thugs to Dickie's house, and he fled.

Morelli shrewdly guesses that Dickie has little to no interest in testifying against his partners; his sole motive is to get the key back from Stephanie, which is why he is trying to stay close to Morelli. Stephanie also guesses that Petiak has eliminated his two other partners and now knows that she has the key, after interrogating Dickie. Surprised, Stephanie remembers that she left the desk clock in her rundown Crown Victoria after it broke down, and Ranger had it towed to a salvage yard.

After visiting her parents, Stephanie is ambushed by Petiak and two thugs, who demand the key. Stephanie guides them to the salvage yard, where she manages to slip free, run into the foreman's office and lock the door. Petiak tries to use his flamethrower on the door, but the flames ricochet and set him on fire, and he topples to his death into an activated garbage crusher. Stephanie finds a phone and calls Morelli, who arrives followed by Ranger, Dickie and Joyce. Joyce is infuriated to hear that Dickie has lost the $40 million, calls him a waste of her time, and storms away.

After the investigation is completed, Stephanie and Morelli return to his house. Morelli regretfully reports that, since there is no evidence of criminal activity in the firm's records, and Dickie appears to be guilty of nothing more than "being stupid and devious", he will likely end up as sole owner of the office property and the $40 million. Stephanie is galled, but Morelli tells her that "justice has a way of prevailing", and something may yet still happen to prevent Dickie from claiming the money. He also reminds her that, thanks to her tantrum, Joyce is no longer involved with Dickie and won't be getting any share of the money.

=== Car deaths ===
- Stephanie's Ford Crown Victoria: broken down, and subsequently crushed into a cube at a salvage yard;
- Joyce's Mercedes-Benz: disabled when one of Ranger's men removes the engine, though subsequently repaired

=== FTAs ===
- Stuart Hansen: possession of a controlled substance; Hansen is found hiding in the kitchen of his family home, which has been converted into a marijuana farm; a stray gunshot from Lula shatters a bottle of ether, and Stephanie, Lula, and Hansen barely escape before the house explodes in flames; thanks to the marijuana fumes from the fire, in short order, "people are driving in from all over Jersey to breathe in Burg air."
- Simon Diggory: assault and disturbing the peace; Diggory is a professional grave-robber; after several failed attempts to bring him in (one of which strands Stephanie and Lula in an open grave during a rainstorm), Stephanie finally corners Diggory in the parking lot of a convenience store, where he does tax returns for several Burg citizens. He agrees to turn himself in, and do Stephanie's taxes for free, if she will wait a couple of weeks for him to finish his "clients'" returns.
- Carl Coglin: destruction of private property; a taxidermist, Coglin has a penchant for building IEDs with the bodies of his stuffed animals, and is living at home while waiting for the cable company to show up (he was arrested after exploding one of his animals in company truck). Stephanie convinces him to come with her by asking her Grandma Mazur to house-sit for him while they are at the courthouse. She also buys a stuffed beaver from Coglin and explodes it in Joyce's living room, as payback for reporting her to the police.
