= Fearless Fourteen =

2008 novel by Janet Evanovich

- First edition
- Author: Janet Evanovich
- Language: English
- Series: Stephanie Plum
- Genre: Crime novel
- Publisher: St. Martin's Press
- Publication date: June 17, 2008
- Publication place: United States
- Media type: Print (Hardcover)
- Preceded by: Plum Lucky and Lean Mean Thirteen
- Followed by: Plum Spooky and Finger Lickin' Fifteen

Fearless Fourteen is a novel written by Janet Evanovich, the fourteenth in her series featuring bounty hunter Stephanie Plum. It was released on June 17, 2008.

== Plot summary ==
Stephanie Plum apprehends Loretta Rizzi for failure to appear in court, but Loretta, who is a distant cousin of Stephanie's policeman boyfriend, Joe Morelli, agrees to go along only if Stephanie will take care of her son, Mario. Unfortunately, Loretta has no collateral and no relatives willing to sign for her, so she has to remain in jail. Stephanie is now responsible for Mario, a.k.a. Zook, who is obsessed with playing Minionfire, a popular MMORPG.

Meanwhile, Ranger needs Stephanie's help with a job: Brenda (a famous one-name singer like Cher or Madonna) is coming to town and she needs security, so Stephanie reluctantly obliges. Stephanie and Ranger's assorted merry men help to protect Brenda from PETA protesters, women protesting Brenda's breast augmentation, and Brenda's cousin/stalker, Gary, who claims to have psychic abilities since being struck by lightning.

Loretta is eventually bailed out, but within hours of her release, she is kidnapped. Stephanie contacts Loretta's brother, Dom, who has a history of anger issues and has just finished a prison term for a bank robbery of $9 million. Dom is enraged to learn that his nephew has been staying at Morelli's, and alleges that Mario is Morelli's son (as Loretta had never revealed the identity of his father) and threatens to kill Morelli.

Stephanie takes Zook to stay with her parents, and he quickly gets Stephanie's Grandma Mazur and two of her friends hooked on Minionfire. After Zook upsets Stephanie's mother by decorating the house with graffiti, however, Stephanie has to take him back to Morelli's until she can locate Loretta. Then, Stephanie's ex-stoner classmate Walter "Mooner" Dunphy arrives at Morelli's, revealing that he is the Minionfire player Moondog who has been griefing Zook and Grandma Mazur.

Stephanie is working with Ranger to protect Brenda, and trying to survive Lula's engagement to Tank, Ranger's right-hand man. Brenda tries to start a bounty-hunter reality show and goes with Stephanie and Lula on an apprehension, but causes them to be attacked by the FTA's pet monkey. Gary the stalker also begins to lurk at Morelli's house with Zook and Mooner. After repeated break-ins and the discovery of a dead body in the basement, Stephanie and Morelli realize that either the robbery money or some clue to its location is buried in the basement, which is a problem because Morelli had a concrete floor poured after inheriting the house, which would have gone to Dom, had he not been convicted of robbery.

Stephanie discovers that Dom has been staying with his old friend Jelly Kantner, and breaks into the apartment to investigate, when two men come looking for Dom. She hides under the bed, but hears enough to realize that they're the other two partners in the robbery.

After Brenda, who is now trying her hand as an investigative reporter, suggests on television that the money is buried in Morelli's yard, local treasure-hunters keep showing up with shovels, effectively destroying his yard. Morelli, tired of the chaos and already footing the bill to feed everyone who's begun frequenting his house, pays Zook, Mooner, and Gary to act as security and keep the treasure-diggers away. Then, in a more serious turn of events, Stephanie receives a package containing a severed pinkie toe, purportedly Loretta's.

Figuring out that the corpse in Morelli's basement was one of Dom's three partners in the robbery, Stephanie goes to confront Stanley Zero, the other known partner, but finds him dead. Stephanie is contacted by the unknown fourth partner, who wants to trade Loretta for the money, which is hidden in a van in a location that only Dom knows. The police prepare a duplicate van and fake money, but the fourth partner contacts Stephanie and tells her that he's aware of the deception, and unless she gets the real money to him by noon the next day, he will cut off Loretta's hand.

Stephanie discovers that a camera has been mounted on the house across the street from Morelli's, which explains how the kidnapper has been aware of events at the house. Morelli sends a lab technician to disable the camera, and when Stephanie talks to him, she recognizes his voice: He was the other man in Jelly's apartment, and therefore the fourth partner in the robbery.

Dom arrives, recognizes the kidnapper, and makes a deal to take him to the money. Stephanie tries to get Dom to stall until the police arrive, but he refuses, so she, Mooner, Zook, and Gary (along with their homemade potato guns which they've been using for security) pursue them, followed by Brenda and her TV crew. As the kidnapper is escaping in the van, Mooner shoots a potato through his windshield, causing him to crash into a deli. This makes the van explode, killing the kidnapper and sending the stolen money flying. Loretta is retrieved from the kidnapper's basement, uninjured and with all her toes intact. Gary's prophecy comes true: the explosion at the deli caused Brenda to be hit by a flying frozen pizza.

The story ends at Morelli's house with everyone watching the news. Mooner managed to collect some of the stolen money during the explosion, but gives most of it away. Brenda announces that she's leaving New Jersey to do a reality show with Gary. Dom declares that he no longer wants to kill Morelli, even though he abandoned Loretta after impregnating her. Surprised, Loretta explains that she never slept with Morelli as a teenager, and that Mario's father was a classmate who died in a freak accident the day after he got her pregnant.

=== Car death(s) ===
- Stephanie's Nissan Sentra: not destroyed, but heavily graffiti'd by "Zook".

=== FTAs ===
- Loretta Ricci: armed robbery;
- Susan Stitch: assault with a deadly weapon.
