= Four to Score =

1998 crime novel by Janet Evanovich

- First Edition
- Author: Janet Evanovich
- Language: English
- Series: Stephanie Plum
- Genre: Crime
- Published: June 15, 1998 St. Martin's Press
- Publication place: United States
- Media type: Print (Hardcover, Paperback)
- Pages: 304 pp
- ISBN: 0-312-18586-3
- OCLC: 38468414
- Dewey Decimal: 813/.54 21
- LC Class: PS3555.V2126 F6 1998
- Preceded by: Three to Get Deadly
- Followed by: High Five

Four to Score is the fourth novel by Janet Evanovich featuring the bounty hunter Stephanie Plum and her friends and family in New Jersey. Written in 1998, it is set mainly in Trenton, but also includes Point Pleasant and Atlantic City.

== Plot summary ==
Stephanie is infuriated to learn that her boss/cousin, Vinnie, has hired her arch-rival Joyce Barnhardt as another bounty hunter. Vinnie tells her to "be professional" and focus on tracking down her latest FTA: Maxine Nowicki, a waitress accused of stealing her ex-boyfriend's car and jumping bail.

Eddie gives Stephanie a coded message from Maxine, that references some "property", and explains that Maxine has some embarrassing love letters he once wrote to her, and promises Stephanie an extra $1,000 to let him talk to Maxine before she delivers her to the cops, which Stephanie agrees to. Looking for help cracking the codes from her neighbors, one of them steers her to a nephew, Salvatore Sweet, who has a knack for such things. "Sally" is an aspiring rock musician who made his big breakthrough performing in drag.

With Sally's help, Stephanie decodes the message, which leads her to the second, and third, and so on. Maxine's trail takes Stephanie and her hangers-on—Sally, former-prostitute-turned-backup Lula, and even Stephanie's Grandma Mazur—all over Trenton, to Point Pleasant, and even to Atlantic City. Stephanie encounters Maxine several times, but never manages to capture her. Along the way she interviews Maxine's mother and her friend Margie, learning that someone else has been visiting them and demanding Maxine's whereabouts, going so far as to scalp Mrs. Nowicki and cut off one of Margie's fingers.

Alarmingly, someone is stalking Stephanie, leaving threatening notes warning her to stay away from their boyfriend. When the stalker throws a firebomb through Stephanie's bedroom window, Stephanie is thankfully not home, but her apartment is almost entirely destroyed. In fright, she takes her hamster, Rex, and goes to stay with Morelli at his house, and she and Morelli finally resume their intimate relationship.

The stalker is found to be Sugar, who Stephanie and Morelli apprehend at a nightclub. One of Eddie's friends confides to Stephanie that Eddie passed him a counterfeit $20 bill, and Morelli admits that he has been working with the U.S. Treasury, monitoring a suspected counterfeiter in the area.

When Eddie Kuntz disappears, Stephanie talks to his Uncle Leo and Aunt Betty, who appear unconcerned and refuse to answer any questions. A bit later Stephanie goes snooping through Leo and Betty's basement, and finds a corpse wrapped in a garbage bag. Leo and Betty catch her and are about to kill her, when Lula distracts them with a gunshot through the window, allowing Stephanie to run and call for help. At the same time the police arrive to arrest Betty and Leo, Eddie Kuntz appears, having been kidnapped by Maxine and released after being tattooed with derogatory slogans.

A tip from Eddie's friend sends Stephanie and Lula to the airport, intercepting Maxine before she can leave the country. Joyce Barnhardt actually makes the apprehension first, but Stephanie and Lula, deciding they have earned the "collar", tase Joyce and leave her unconscious behind the wheel of her car. Mrs. Nowicki and Margie are also waiting at the airport, but Stephanie lets them go, since she has no authority to detain them.

Morelli reports that the investigation has turned out very well for the police: Leo is a retired enforcer for the mob in Detroit; twenty years ago, he stole a set of well-made counterfeiting plates and later decided to set up business in Trenton, washing the money through a dry cleaner's owned by another ex-Mafioso. Eddie helped with the counterfeiting, and couldn't resist bragging to Maxine about what a "big shot" he was. Maxine was once in love with Eddie, but he was abusive and unfaithful, and she planned the perfect revenge: after she was bailed out of jail for stealing his car, she pretended to make up with Eddie, persuaded him to show her the plates, then stole them.

The coded messages were a game to torment Eddie, who was desperate to get the plates back, but Maxine did not anticipate that Leo would go hunting for her himself, including mutilating her mother and Margie. He also killed his partner, the dry cleaner (the body Stephanie found in his basement).

Eventually, Maxine demanded $1 million in genuine money in exchange for the plates, and Leo complied. Maxine was planning to leave the country with her mother and Margie when Stephanie caught up with her. Stephanie and Morelli's sympathies are firmly with Maxine, and Morelli adds that no additional charges will likely be pressed against Maxine—there is no evidence of the blackmail, and Eddie is too humiliated to prosecute her for kidnapping—so Maxine will likely serve a short jail sentence for the original auto theft charge, and then be free to join Mrs. Nowicki and Margie and enjoy her million dollars.

Morelli invites Stephanie for a celebratory ride on his Ducati motorcycle. Stephanie, afraid of being relegated to the "helpless female" role in their burgeoning relationship, demands that he make the ultimate concession and let her drive. Morelli concedes, but says she will owe him later.

== Characters ==
- Stephanie Plum, the protagonist of the story, is a former lingerie saleswoman and currently works as a bounty hunter for her cousin Vinnie (Vincent Plum).
- Grandma Mazur is the feisty matriarch of the family who loves a good funeral and thrilling action. It is impossible to shock her.
- Connie is the office manager at Vincent Plum Bail Bonds, a bit older than Stephanie, wears her hair in a beehive, and is sympathetic to Stephanie but stays on Vinnie's good side as well.
- Lula works at Vincent Plum Bail Bonds helping out with filing, and sometimes helping Stephanie out with apprehensions, surveillance, whatever is needed. A former sex worker in One for the Money, her voluptuous body and dramatic fashion sense complement her ability to face any situation.
- Vinnie is Stephanie's cousin, owns the Bail Bonds company, but acts out in his private life to the embarrassment of Stephanie and her family
- Morelli has been in Stephanie's life since childhood, in a very complicated way. He grew up and became a cop, and also a better-than-most Morelli, working with/against Stephanie in almost equal measure.
- Ranger had been Stephanie's mentor starting out, as he also works for Vinnie as a bounty hunter. His skill set is extensive, his body is "as good as a body can get", and his other income-earning activities and extensive and successful.
- Maxine Nowicki is Stephanie's FTA—life-long Trenton resident, high school softball player and waitress at the Silver Dollar Diner. Maxine was arrested for stealing her boyfriend's car. The car (which Maxine had often borrowed) was returned, however she failed to show up in court—having previously disappeared "on vacation".
- Eddie Kuntz is Maxine's boyfriend and car owner. He does have over-pumped, steroid-enhanced muscles, and he believes that he has a way with women. While dining with Stephanie at her parents' house for Saturday night chicken, Eddie mentions that Maxine contacted him and promised to "make him squirm".
- Uncle Leo is Eddie's uncle, who with Betty rent him the other half of their duplex.
- Aunt Betty is Eddie's aunt, who with Eddie rent him the other half of their duplex.
- Salvatore Sweet, "Sally" is a musician and cross-dresser who has excelled at puzzles all his life. He helps Stephanie decode the messages Maxine keeps leaving for Eddie.
- Gregory Stern, "Sugar" is the roommate, bandmate and close friend of Sally who helped him learn to cross dress. Sugar is secretly in love with Sally, and misreads the relationship between Sally and Stephanie as something problematic.
- Terry Gilman is a foe from high school who went with Morelli to Prom. After cheerleading for the NY Giants for some years, she has since returned to work for her Uncle Vito Grizolli, a local Mob boss.
- Kenny Martin is Vito Grizolli's nephew, and when he failed to appear for his court date after an armed robbery, Ranger asks her to assist him in separating him from the other Grizolli's at Stiva's.
- Constantine Stiva is the owner of the funeral home that is most popular with Stephanie's community.

=== Car deaths ===
1. Stephanie's Honda CRX: soaked in gasoline by Sugar, then ignited by a discarded cigarette butt from Mrs. Nowicki.
2. Lula's Pontiac Firebird: parked by Stephanie's car and blown up with it

=== Failure-to-appear (FTA) assignments ===
- Maxine Nowicki: Motor vehicle theft
- Kenny "the Man" Martin: armed robbery
- Norvil Thompson: armed robbery

== Critical reception ==
Publishers Weekly called Stephanie "Half-Hungarian, half-Italian and all-Jersey, Trenton's best-known bounty hunter... a raucous delight." With Four to Score, Evanovich switched to St. Martin's Press. Her first three books in the Stephanie Plum series each had incremental sales increases. Four to Score sold 100% more than Three to Get Deadly.
