= Ten Big Ones =

2004 novel by Janet Evanovich

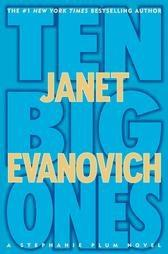
- First edition cover
- Author: Janet Evanovich
- Language: English
- Series: Stephanie Plum
- Genre: Crime novel
- Publisher: St. Martin's Press
- Publication date: May 31, 2004
- Publication place: United States
- Media type: Print (Hardcover, Paperback)
- Pages: 312 pp (first edition, hardback)
- ISBN: 0-312-28972-3 (first edition, hardback)
- OCLC: 54432613
- Dewey Decimal: 813/.54 22
- LC Class: PS3555.V2126 T47 2004
- Preceded by: To the Nines
- Followed by: Eleven on Top

Ten Big Ones is the tenth novel by Janet Evanovich featuring the bounty hunter Stephanie Plum. It was written in 2004.

The novel depicts Stephanie's inadvertent exposure to the worsening gang activity in Trenton, which leads to her being targeted for assassination.

== Plot summary ==
Stephanie and Lula happen to be waiting outside a deli when a young man in a red Devil mask runs outside after robbing it, only to find that his getaway bicycle's tire is flat, Lula having shot it while trying to disprove Stephanie's doubts about her marksmanship. "Red Devil" throws a Molotov cocktail into the store, but the owner throws it back before it explodes, accidentally destroying Stephanie's latest car. Her boyfriend, police detective Joe Morelli, warns her that gang activity in Trenton is worsening, and "Red Devil"'s gang, the "Comstock Street Slayers", may decide to target her, especially if he believes Stephanie can identify him without his mask.

By coincidence, Stephanie is driving her latest FTA, Salvatore "Sally" Sweet, and her Grandma Mazur, to the police station, when she notices Red Devil and several gang cohorts at a fast food drive-through. She calls the police, but the gang opens fire with automatic weapons, wounding her friend, Officer Eddie Gazzara, though not seriously. Furious and terrified in equal measure, Stephanie tries to think of a way to neutralize the gang, especially since she refuses Morelli's attempts to keep her under house arrest at his home.

Stephanie's mentor, former Special Forces soldier and bounty hunter Carlos "Ranger" Manoso, loans Stephanie the use of a truck from his security company's fleet. On a whim, she follows the truck's GPS system to its previous location, which turns out to be a high-security office building with a luxurious apartment on the top floor, where Stephanie decides to wait out the crisis, at least until Ranger returns from his out-of-state trip. Although she feels that she and her family members are safe for the time being, she can't relax until the gang is no longer a threat to her.

Stephanie catches a break when she recognizes her latest FTA, Anton Ward, as the Red Devil. She, Connie Rosoli and Lula bail Ward out of jail and spirit him to their boss, Vincent Plum's second home in Point Pleasant, intending to interrogate him about the gang's intentions, but none of them can sufficiently intimidate him. When Ranger returns from his trip, Stephanie takes him to Ward, who quickly confesses: after the Slayers' Trenton "captain" was killed, the gang brought "Junkman", a ranking member of the gang's Los Angeles branch, to fill the vacancy, but to prove himself to the gang, he is required to kill a list of targets, including two rival gang members and one police officer (which he already has), and finally Stephanie. As a bounty hunter, Stephanie has apprehended several members of the gang in the past, all of whom consider it humiliating to be brought to jail by a woman. Stephanie is sickened to hear that the Slayers' plan is to kidnap and gang-rape her before Junkman kills her.

Ranger offers Stephanie the continued use of his apartment, but when Morelli tells her that someone tentatively identified as Junkman has been arrested, Stephanie considers the threat over and rushes out to attend her sister Valerie's bridal shower. Stepping outside the hall, she is kidnapped without warning and brought to a children's playground where the Slayers hold court at night. Before she is attacked, however, Sally Sweet, whose band was playing at the shower and saw her being abducted, drives his school bus onto the scene and opens fire on the gang members with a fully automatic Uzi, killing several, including Junkman, and causing the rest to flee. Before the police and Ranger's men arrive, Stephanie places dropped guns into the hands of the dead Slayers to ensure that it appears they fired first and Sally acted in defense of himself and her. Morelli and Ranger, amused at having been "upstaged by a man in a strapless dress," congratulate Sally for his heroism and mention that the city has posted a $10,000 reward ("ten big ones") for Junkman's capture.

=== Car deaths ===
- Stephanie's Ford Escape - Fire bombed by the Red Devil
- Stephanie's $200 Lincoln Town Car - Sprayed with graffiti and shot to bits by The Slayers.

=== Almost car death ===
- "Big Blue" - sprayed with graffiti, but somehow spared being destroyed; recovered by Morelli and detailed back to normal

=== FTAs ===
- Roger Banker
- Harold Pancek
- Carol Cantell
- Salvatore "Sally" Sweet
- Anton Ward
- Shoshanna Brown
- Jamil Rodriguez

== Major events ==
- Stephanie learns, for the first time, the location of Ranger's office and residence, which is a closely guarded secret in the previous books.
- Sally Sweet reappears after his introduction in "Four to Score", and, because of his extensive knowledge about women's clothing, is hired by the Plum family as Valerie's wedding planner.

== Publication history ==
When Janet Evanovich was questioned why she decided to focus on gang violence in this book, she replied, "I keep in touch with the Trenton Police Department. Over the last few years Bloods and Crips have come into the Trenton area, and it's caused serious problems."
