= Hot Six =

2000 novel by Janet Evanovich

- First cover
- Author: Janet Evanovich
- Language: English
- Series: Stephanie Plum
- Genre: Crime novel
- Publisher: St. Martin's Press
- Publication date: June 2000
- Publication place: United States
- Media type: Print (Hardcover, Paperback)
- ISBN: 1-4028-0666-3
- Preceded by: High Five
- Followed by: Seven Up

Hot Six is the sixth novel by Janet Evanovich featuring the bounty hunter Stephanie Plum and was published in 2000.

The novel was a finalist for the 2001 Dilys Award.

== Plot summary ==
The prologue begins at the point where High Five ended, revealing who Stephanie picked: Ranger or Joe Morelli.

Five months later, Stephanie's latest "failure to appear" (FTA), Carol Zabo, is attempting to avoid jail-time by jumping off a bridge to drown herself. Stephanie talks her down by promising to persuade the man who reported her not to press charges.

Returning to the bonds office, Stephanie is handed a nightmare assignment: Ranger has gone FTA, and Stephanie has to track him down. Apart from her attraction to and respect for Ranger, Stephanie knows that his skills as a bounty hunter are far beyond hers. Ranger was scheduled to appear in court for a minor charge of carrying a concealed weapon, but he is also wanted for questioning related to a fire in an office park, where Homer Ramos, the son of notorious international arms dealer Alexander Ramos, was killed. Stephanie is afraid Ranger might be suspected of murdering Homer, and even more afraid that he might have actually done it.

To complicate matters, Stephanie also has to deal with:

- Being followed by two hit men, waiting for Ranger to make contact with her;
- Being followed by her nemesis, Joyce Barnhardt, expecting the same;
- her eccentric Grandma Mazur moving into her apartment after an argument with Stephanie's father;
- being saddled with a giant, voracious dog named Bob; Stephanie initially agrees to dog-sit Bob as a favor to the police officer who arrested Carol Zabo, in exchange for him dropping the charges, but then realizes that the move is meant to be permanent;
- having to track down the high-bond FTAs normally given to Ranger, including a psychopathic killer/rapist, Morris Munson.

Ranger makes contact with her (without giving her the opportunity to capture him) and asks her to do surveillance on the Ramos family's properties in Jersey. When she drives past the Ramos compound in Deal, she is surprised when Alexander, the Ramos patriarch himself, jumps into her car alone and offers her $20 to drive him to a bar so he can smoke without interference. Over drinks, Stephanie pretends to recognize Alexander from news coverage and expresses her condolences over Homer's death. Alexander is dismissive, saying Homer was "stupid and greedy", and caused his own death.

Breaking into the Trenton home of Alexander's eldest son, Hannibal, Stephanie and Lula find Homer's ex-girlfriend, Cynthia Lotte, searching the house for the jewelry and the silver Porsche that Homer gave her as gifts. They find the Porsche, with a dead man sitting behind the wheel, shot through the head. Cynthia insists on driving away with her Porsche, so Stephanie and Lula are forced to help her shove the corpse out the door, before Stephanie reports the crime. A short time later, Cynthia is also found shot to death, behind the wheel of the Porsche.

Growing impatient, the two hit men, Mitchell and Habib, kidnap Stephanie and bring her before their boss, Arturo Stolle. Stolle says she is to act as the bait for Ranger, but she escapes through the window of the warehouse room they lock her in. Needing to make contact with Ranger again, she asks Carol Zabo to ambush Joyce Barnhardt and ensure that Stephanie is not followed to her meeting. However, this backfires when Joyce orders Stephanie to deliver Ranger to her, or else she will press charges against Carol and likely prompt her to attempt suicide again. Stephanie and Lula manage to trick Joyce into kidnapping an old acquaintance of Lula's who marginally resembles Ranger.

Stephanie confers separately with Morelli and Ranger, and she figures out the mystery. Ranger explains that Arturo Stolle's normal "slice of the Trenton crime pie" is human trafficking, but recently has diversified into drug dealing. He recruited Homer Ramos to be the bagman for his operation, believing that the other Jersey crime factions would be hesitant to cross Alexander. But instead, Homer's actions upset the boundaries between the factions, where previously the Ramos family has restricted their illegal activities to arms, while the mob has enjoyed a monopoly on drugs. Ranger has been acting as an intermediary between the factions, hoping to prevent a crime war. Eventually, the mob decided to have Homer assassinated. Stephanie shrewdly guesses that Homer's death was faked, and Alexander and Hannibal have been hiding him in their houses until he can be slipped out of the country.

When she returns home, Stephanie is confronted and held at gunpoint by Homer, who has been searching frantically for the bag of money he was carrying to the meeting with Ranger. It was originally in the trunk of the Porsche, and he first thought that Cynthia had taken it, but now believes that only Stephanie could have it. Before Homer can shoot her, Ranger appears and subdues him. Later, Morelli gleefully reports to her that Homer has given the police and the FBI enough evidence to indict both Alexander and Hannibal, and that Mitchell and Habib, arrested for kidnapping, have likewise turned evidence on Stolle. In secret, Stephanie learns that, after she drove away in the Porsche, Cynthia unwittingly threw the gym bag filled with money out of the trunk while cleaning it, and it was picked up by Stephanie's friend and sometime-FTA, "Mooner" and his friend Dougie. She decides to let them enjoy it.

After Stephanie spends the night at Morelli's house, they are confronted the next morning by his mother and grandmother, who scold her for taking advantage of him. To her surprise, Morelli assures them that he plans to marry Stephanie.

=== Car deaths ===
This is a list of cars destroyed or abandoned by Stephanie Plum during the course of the novel.

1. Honda Civic, burned up by reefer from Mooner
2. "Rollswagon", not dead, just abandoned for being junk
3. Lincoln Town Car, hit by Morris Munson
4. Carpet Car, set on fire by flaming dog poop bag

=== FTAs ===
1. Carol Zabo: shoplifting, destruction of police property
2. Morris Munson: vehicular manslaughter
3. Lenny Dale: domestic violence
4. Walter "Moon Man" Dunphy: drunk and disorderly, urinating in public

== Reception ==
Hot Six received starred reviews from Booklist, Kirkus Reviews, and Publishers Weekly.

Booklist's GraceAnne A. DeCandido started her review by writing, "If you were angry with Evanovich at the end of High Five, when she coyly didn't tell us which of Stephanie Plum's two studmuffins the Jersey Girl/bounty hunter was planning to visit, you'll soon forgive her". DeCandido ended her review by saying she "can't wait for the next one".

Kirkus Reviews wrote, "Steph and company make for another helping of energetic entertainment".

Publishers Weekly called the novel "wildly amusing" and concluded that "Evanovich just keeps getting better".

Writing for Library Journal, Wilda Williams noted that "the mystery is not particularly interesting" but concluded that "Evanovich's wisecracking, feisty heroine and the bizarre characters she meets will leave readers wanting more".

Booklist also reviewed the audiobook, narrated by C.J. Critt.
