= High Five (novel) =

1999 novel by Janet Evanovich

- First Edition
- Author: Janet Evanovich
- Language: English
- Series: Stephanie Plum
- Genre: Crime
- Publisher: St. Martin's Press
- Publication date: July 16, 1999
- Publication place: United States
- Media type: Print (Hardcover, Paperback)
- Pages: 304 pp
- ISBN: 0-312-20303-9
- OCLC: 41002780
- Preceded by: Four to Score
- Followed by: Hot Six

High Five is the fifth novel by Janet Evanovich featuring the bounty hunter Stephanie Plum. It was written in 1999.

== Plot summary ==
The only Failure-to-Appear (F.T.A.) Vinnie has for Stephanie is so minor league (Briggs), that she focuses her attention on the mysterious disappearance of her Uncle Fred instead. Mabel gives Stephanie some photos she found in Fred's desk of half-opened garbage bags, containing dismembered human body parts. She insists the photos are recent, and very unusual for Fred. Stephanie sees enough to identify the body as a woman's, and gives duplicates of them to her on-again/off-again boyfriend, Detective Joe Morelli, who passes them on to the sergeant in charge of the case. Mabel tells Stephanie that Fred had been furiously pursuing RCG Waste Haulers to get his $2 back because they skipped picking up garbage at his house one time. RCG (Ruben, Grizolli, and Cotell) had refused to refund him, because his payment wasn't in the system - they demanded to see his cancelled check. He was on his way to bring a copy of that to RCG when he disappeared.

While Stephanie is starting to look into Fred's activities, Bunchy shows up, mysteriously demanding that Stephanie find Fred for him. Since the Fred mystery is on her own personal time, Stephanie is facing financial hardship and out of desperation she takes a job with Ranger's security company to make ends meet. Ranger assures her the jobs are morally justifiable, if not entirely legal, but Stephanie is (again) over her head while tagging along with Ranger's men. The activities start with "Interior decorating" -forcibly evicting the occupants of a drug den in a slum apartment building - which ends up in an explosion when the man being evicted is shot by an old lady in a pink nightgown, and the explosives he has attached to himself go off. Further activities include chauffeuring a sheikh; and distracting a deadbeat in a bar while his car is repossessed.

To add to all of Stephanie's problems, Morelli informs her that Benito Ramirez, the psychopathic boxer who attacked Lula and threatened her in One for the Money has been released from prison thanks to the work of expensive lawyers. Ramirez begins stalking her again, playing his game of psychological torture with her. Meanwhile, Ranger lets her use a Porsche Turbo as a "company car" while working for him, which is both exciting and nerve-wracking. On the Morelli front, she is trying to keep her distance because of their relationship goals mismatch, but seeing him with Terry Gilman makes her see red.

Fred's disappearance looks increasingly serious when RCG's receptionist Martha is found shot to death. The next day another employee, Larry Lipinski, apparently commits suicide, leaving behind a note confessing to the Martha's murder. John Curly - an employee at the cable company accused of ripping off customers - was hit by a truck. Stephanie matched the gruesome garbage photos partially to the picture of Larry and his wife used at his memorial, especially since she had 'mysteriously disappeared' around the same time. Stephanie, Grandma Mazur and Bunchy question the wife of the guy being cheated by the cable company, and found out John Curly had taken all the related cancelled checks. Further investigating reveals that both the cable company and RCG are routing a small percentage of customer payments to a different bank - skimming funds for personal use.

While she is investigating, a bomb blows up the Porsche, thankfully without hurting anyone. She shares her suspicions with Morelli, who confirms that the Trenton Police and federal authorities are investigating the same crimes. Vito Grizzoli is co-owner of the garbage company, so at first the police suspected money laundering, then they realized that someone is skimming from Vito's profits. Vito is cooperating with the investigation, but prefers to keep the police at arm's length, so he uses Terry (his niece) and Morelli as intermediaries. "Bunchy" is actually a federal agent named Bronfman, who thinks that Fred somehow stumbled on the scam, and that is why he disappeared.

As the information starts to fall in to place, Allen Shempsky - the bank manager - breaks into Stephanie's apartment, ties up Briggs and ambushes Stephanie, holding her at gunpoint. He says he and Tipp started small, skimming a modest amount just for occasional gambling stakes, but started taking more and more. Larry and Curly got involved, and it started to unravel when Larry's estranged wife, Laura, found out and demanded part of the money. Allen and Larry killed her, Fred happened to see them dumping her body and so Allen killed Fred. Allen also killed Martha, then Larry, and then Curly. He had set the explosives in the car Stephanie was driving when he realized she was close to figuring things out.

Allen is about to kill Stephanie, when Ramirez jumps into the window from her fire escape. Allen empties his gun at Ramirez, killing him, and allowing Stephanie to flee outside and borrow her neighbor's gun. Before she can return to her apartment, Allen escapes.

Stephanie had already promised Ranger to chauffeur Ahmed back to the airport. While she is en route, with Grandma Mazur in the front seat, Briggs calls, having hacked the bank's records and found out that Allen was booked to fly out of the airport within the hour. With Grandma and Ahmed's help, Stephanie apprehends Allen, who confesses where he buried Fred. Stephanie learns Allen was actually stealing from Larry and Curly (who were skimming from Vito).

Returning home from Fred's memorial service, Stephanie decides it is time to make a choice; she dresses in a slinky cocktail dress, then calls one of the two men in her life and asks him to come over. The novel ends without saying which one she called.

== Characters ==
- Stephanie Plum, the protagonist of the story, is a former lingerie saleswoman and currently works as a bounty hunter for her cousin Vinnie (Vincent Plum).
- Grandma Mazur is the feisty matriarch of the family who loves a good funeral and thrilling action. It is impossible to shock her.
- Connie is the office manager at Vincent Plum Bail Bonds, a bit older than Stephanie, wears her hair in a beehive, and is sympathetic to Stephanie but stays on Vinnie's good side as well.
- Lula works at Vincent Plum Bail Bonds helping out with filing, and sometimes helping Stephanie out with apprehensions, surveillance, whatever is needed. A former sex worker in One For the Money, her voluptuous body and dramatic fashion sense complement her ability to face any situation.
- Vinnie is Stephanie's cousin, owns the Bail Bonds company, but acts out in his private life to the embarrassment of Stephanie and her family
- Leona Freeman is a friend of Stephanie's who works at First Trenton bank. She provides the information that the cancelled checks Stephanie showed her were deposited (and cancelled) at First Trenton, but both companies used a different bank for their main business accounts.
- Allen Shempsky is a mild-mannered white guy who holds the position of Vice President of First Trenton bank. He was in school with Stephanie and Leona. Not only was the funds-skimming scheme his idea, but he is responsible for all of the murders as well.
- Martha Deeter - the receptionist at RCG Waste Haulers.
- Larry Lipinski - the bookkeeper at RCG Waste Haulers, who says there's a computer glitch that makes it not recognize some customers.
- Morelli has been in Stephanie's life since childhood, in a very complicated way. He grew up and became a cop, and also a better-than-most Morelli, working with/against Stephanie in almost equal measure.
- Ranger had been Stephanie's mentor starting out, as he also works for Vinnie as a bounty hunter. His skill set is extensive, his body is 'as good as a body can get,' and his other income-earning activities and extensive and successful.
- Randy Briggs is Stephanie's FTA - arrested for carrying a knife. Randy is a computer programmer in his forties who resists Stephanie's efforts in order to finish a project for his boss. And he's a little person. Stephanie does manage to complete the task, but destroys the door to his apartment in the process. Briggs threatens to sue for damages when he gets out on bail, Vinnie instead puts him up in Stephanie's apartment while repairs are completed.
- Bunchy shows up in Stephanie's life claiming to be a bookie that Fred owes money too, which Stephanie doubts. Lula helps distract him once while Stephanie escapes. Over time he seems less sinister than a lot of the other characters running around, and Stephanie end up going along - answering his questions and putting up with him tailing her. Turns out he's a federal treasury agent working with Morelli, whose real name is Bronfman. When it's all over, he asks for Lula's phone number.
- Fred Schutz is a Pip. He's Stephanie's Uncle who was out running errands and seemingly vanished. A longtime philanderer, he is also extremely frugal. When he had extra yard leaves to get rid of, he went to dump them behind Giovichinni's (who overcharged him for meat in his opinion), and saw Larry and Allen dumping trash illegally nearby. He tried to get his $2 back from RCG, and was annoyed by Larry.. then realized that's who he'd seen dumping trash. He went back to take pictures of the trash Larry had dumped, and found human body parts. He took a whole roll of pictures, intending to blackmail Larry.
- Mabel Schutz is married to Fred, not especially happily. Her preoccupation the week after he's gone is figuring out which changes to make in her life first.
- Winnie Black is married to Axel but sleeping with Fred, and is able to explain the missing hour on the day he disappeared.
- Benito Ramirez is a sadistic serial rapist, who loved the smell of fear and enjoyed causing prolonged pain and terror. His dramatic championship boxing career was just about to take off in One for the Money. Now that he was released from jail, he was back to terrorize Stephanie for getting him put away.
- Constantine Stiva is the owner of the funeral home that is most popular for Stephanie's community.
- Terry Gilman is a foe from high school who went with Morelli to Prom, and now after a few short careers is back working for her uncle Vito.
- Vito Grizolli is a local mob boss, and Terry's uncle. He's involved in various commercial ventures including, but is the victim of theft himself at the moment.
- Harvey Tipp is Vito's accounts receivable guy. He starting skimming from Vito originally, along with Allen. Later after it all unraveled, he gave Allen up to Morelli.
- Ahmed Fahed is a young, spoiled sheikh who is visiting relatives in Trenton.
- Sol Burger was a person around the area whose account was messed up by the cable company - his payments were misapplied.
- Margaret Burger, Sol's wife, helped Stephanie figure things out when she found the one misfiled cancelled check to the cable company that John Curly hadn't taken.
- John Curly was a cable company employee who was skimming funds
- Mark Stemper - was filling in at RCG Waste Haulers when Stephanie came in to get Fred and Mabel's account cleared up, and showed him the cancelled check. He sent a copy to the main office. He was never seen again.

=== Car Death ===
1. Stephanie's Porsche Boxster (on loan from Ranger): crushed by a garbage truck, then destroyed by a bomb
2. The aforementioned garbage truck: blown up next to the Porsche
3. Stephanie's BMW (also on loan from Ranger): Stolen

=== Failure-to-Appear (FTA) assignments ===
- Randy Briggs: carrying concealed
- Alphonse Ruzick: armed robbery and assault with a deadly weapon
- Kenyan Lally: spousal abuse, history of DUI's

== Critical reception ==
High Five - which continued Stephanie's string of comical mysteries - also was the first in the Stephanie Plum series to end with a cliffhanger. Publishers' Weekly recommends High Five as being " just as wacky and over the top as its predecessors" with continual action, biting dialogue and particularly unique characters. High Five was also commercially successful, reaching the Times fiction list.
