= Hard Eight (novel) =

Novel by Janet Evanovich

- First cover
- Author: Janet Evanovich
- Language: English
- Series: Stephanie Plum
- Genre: Crime novel
- Publisher: St. Martin's Press
- Publication date: June 18, 2002
- Publication place: United States
- Media type: Print (Hardcover, Paperback)
- Pages: pp
- ISBN: 0-312-26585-9
- OCLC: 49406167
- Dewey Decimal: 813/.54 21
- LC Class: PS3555.V2126 H37 2002b
- Preceded by: Seven Up
- Followed by: Visions of Sugar Plums, To the Nines

Hard Eight is the eighth novel by Janet Evanovich featuring the bounty hunter Stephanie Plum. It was written in 2002.

Hard Eight revolves around a child custody bond, rather than a criminal bail bond, and marks the (sometimes repeated) departure of the series from Stephanie chasing bad guys to Stephanie being stalked by bad guys. The ninth, tenth, eleventh and twelfth volumes likewise revolve around Stephanie having a stalker.

== Plot ==
Stephanie is asked by her parents' next-door neighbor, Mabel Markowitz, to find her granddaughter, Evelyn and great-granddaughter, Annie, who have disappeared. During a messy divorce with her ex-husband, Steven Soter, Evelyn was forced to post a child custody bond, and Mabel used her house as collateral. If Evelyn is not found, then the bond company will foreclose on her house, and the money will be forfeited to Steven. Mabel asks for Stephanie's help, since as a bounty hunter she is the closest thing Mabel knows to a detective. Stephanie is unable to refuse, even though she is not a private investigator.

After interviewing Evelyn's bondsman, Les Sebring, and Steven Soter, Stephanie is baffled; Steven was domineering and abusive, and Evelyn had no friends or other family members she might go to in an emergency, and no one has any idea where she might have gone. Steven seems to be less concerned about Annie's well-being than he is eager to get his hands on the bond money.

While snooping through Evelyn's apartment, Stephanie encounters her landlord, a local crime boss named Eddie Abruzzi. He warns Stephanie that if she knows where Evelyn is, she should tell him, or else he will "declare war" and she will be "the enemy." Stephanie's mentor, Ranger Manoso, explains to her that Abruzzi is an avid wargamer, and tends to frame everything in quasi-military terms.

At the Plum home, a new crisis arises when Stephanie's "perfect" sister, Valerie, gets fired from her job at the bank. Stephanie's mother turns to her in desperation, and Stephanie improvises, setting Valerie up with Albert Kloughn, Evelyn's hapless divorce lawyer. Kloughn's practice has been slow in taking off, so he soon becomes attached to Stephanie, following her and Lula around in trying to apprehend fugitives and investigate Evelyn's whereabouts.

As she is trying to track down Evelyn, Stephanie is unnerved to realize that she is being stalked. First, someone leaves a bag of wild snakes attached to her apartment door, then a large tarantula on the seat of her car. Worse, men dressed in animal costumes are following her around. An attack by one of the men destroys Stephanie's car, then a second. When the men try to kidnap her, her mother sees them and impulsively runs over one with her car.

Finally, Stephanie comes home one night and finds Steven Soter on her living room couch, shot through the head. The police investigate, and when she asks Joe Morelli how the body got into her apartment without any of her neighbors noticing, she is horrified by his answer: Soter's body was sawed in half at the waist, and the pieces were carried in with two large bags, then taped back together.

Stephanie realizes that Abruzzi is "conducting psychological warfare" against her, believing that she knows where Evelyn is. Ranger asks around and finds out that Abruzzi is searching obsessively for his most prized possession: a medal that once belonged to Napoleon. Abruzzi, besides being a wargamer, is an avid collector of military memorabilia, and believes the medal is a lucky talisman. Ranger admits he doesn't know why Abruzzi would think Evelyn has the medal, but obviously he does.

Then Ranger informs her that he is collecting on her "debt" to him, and, since Stephanie is on a "break" from her relationship with Morelli, she consents to have sex with Ranger.

With Soter's death, the child custody bond is no longer necessary, and Mabel is relieved to be told that her house is safe, but Evelyn does not resurface. Stephanie eventually tracks her to the airport, before she is about to leave for Miami with Annie. Evelyn explains that Steven was in debt to Abruzzi, and was scared of him, but Abruzzi considered Steven a member of his "command", and so invited Steven and all of his "troops" with small children to Abruzzi's daughter's birthday party. While she was there, Annie wandered into Abruzzi's office and palmed the medal, thinking it was a party favor.

Now that Evelyn is finally free of Steven, she has arranged to sell the medal to a collector in Miami for enough money to start a new life. She knew Abruzzi was threatening Mabel, but she couldn't come out of hiding or go to the police, knowing that "the law moves too slowly for a guy like Abruzzi." Stephanie, seeing how scared and desperate Evelyn is, lets her and Annie go.

When Stephanie returns to her apartment, Abruzzi's men appear in a van, holding Valerie at gunpoint, telling Stephanie to come with them or they'll kill her sister. Stephanie complies, and Valerie is released. Stephanie is brought to Abruzzi at a safe house, and he begins torturing her - searing her arm with a hot poker - for Evelyn's exact location in Miami, which she doesn't know. Before he can do more, Valerie, who has followed them, jumps into the van and drives it through the wall of the house, allowing both her and Stephanie to escape.

Running home, Stephanie calls both Morelli and Ranger. After listening to her story, Ranger excuses himself, and a short time later, Abruzzi is found dead in his car, with a note saying that he has killed himself over some recent business failures. Stephanie is unnerved to know that Ranger has killed Abruzzi to keep her and Evelyn safe, but she and Morelli silently agree not to pursue it any further.

=== Car deaths ===
1. Honda CR-V - Fire bombed by a rabbit-costumed man
2. Honda CR-V - Doused with lighter fluid and lit up with a match
3. Ranger's truck - Set on fire when a package was thrown in the bed

=== FTAs ===
- Andy Bender
- Martin Paulson
- Laura Minello

== Notable events ==
- The novel introduces Albert Kloughn, a struggling attorney and later Stephanie's brother-in-law.
- Stephanie, on a "break" from her relationship with Joe Morelli, has sex with Ranger.
