= Stephanie Plum =

Fictional character

- First appearance: One for the Money (novel)
- Created by: Janet Evanovich
- Portrayed by: Katherine Heigl

In-universe information
- Gender: Female
- Occupation: Bounty Hunter
- Nationality: American

Stephanie Plum is a fictional character and the protagonist in a series of novels written by Janet Evanovich. She is a spunky combination of Nancy Drew and Dirty Harry, and—although a female bounty hunter—is the opposite of Domino Harvey. She is described by the author as "incredibly average and yet heroic if necessary".

Evanovich claims the inspiration for Stephanie's character came after watching Midnight Run starring Charles Grodin and Robert De Niro, adding, "If Mickey Spillane wrote Archie and Veronica, Stephanie would be Betty." As the series has progressed, Stephanie has become more stable and responsible, and a better bounty hunter. "But truthfully," Evanovich says, "Stephanie has stayed the same more than she's changed."

As of 2026, Stephanie has appeared in 31 full-length novels, four holiday novellas, and a short story in a compilation of various authors' works. The first book, One for the Money, was adapted as a 2012 film starring Katherine Heigl as Stephanie.

== Character history ==
Evanovich admits that Stephanie Plum's character is inspired by her own, in both history and "similar embarrassing experiences". Evanovich says, "I wouldn't go so far as to say Stephanie is an autobiographical character, but I will admit to knowing where she lives."

Like Evanovich, Stephanie originates from New Jersey, although Janet hails from South River and Stephanie was born in Trenton, New Jersey, the city where the series is set. Stephanie grew up in the Chambersburg neighborhood known to locals as "the Burg", and—like Evanovich—attended Douglass College, although Stephanie graduated "without distinction". The Burg is often portrayed in the series as a close-knit community, from which people rarely leave. Stephanie often finds former classmates and neighbors still living in the Burg, only a few streets away from their childhood home. After graduation, Stephanie married Dickie Orr, then promptly divorced him after discovering him in their new home, cheating on her with rival Joyce Barnhardt on their brand new dining room table.

At the beginning of the first book, One for the Money, Stephanie has been laid off from her job as a lingerie buyer, she is being forced to sell off her appliances one by one in order to pay her rent, and her car is repossessed. This last straw prompts her to turn to her cousin Vinnie, owner of Vincent Plum Bail Bonds, for a job. She originally hopes to find a file clerk job at the Bail Bonds office but the position was taken, and the only position available is as an apprehension agent or bounty hunter. Vinnie refuses to hire her, but she manages to convince him to give her a shot by threatening to blackmail him. Stephanie's financial situation is still rather perilous, partially due to her poor financial skills, and she often finds herself seeking alternative ways to earn money in order to pay her bills.

When the series begins, Stephanie Plum is single and living with her hamster, Rex, in an apartment building with predominantly elderly neighbors. She regularly visits her parents who live several miles away in the Burg for meals, "family time," and pineapple upside-down cake. While Stephanie finds her family stressful, they often give her tips or connections which assist in her job.

== Appearance ==
Stephanie Plum briefly describes herself in the first chapter of each book, typically mentioning her Italian-Hungarian descent, fast metabolism, with light skin, naturally curly brown hair (that she keeps shoulder-length), and blue eyes, and is 5 feet 7 inches (170 cm) tall, and roughly 130 pounds (59 kg). Katherine Heigl of Grey's Anatomy landed the role for the feature film, One for the Money, released on January 27, 2012.

== Friends and colleagues ==
=== Lula ===
Lula was introduced as a minor character working as a hooker in the first book in the series, One For the Money. In Two For the Dough, she becomes Vinnie's filing clerk and Stephanie's occasional partner. Stephanie refers to her as a plus-sized black woman who attempts to shove a size 16 body into size 10 spandex. She reappears in later books after she begins to work as a file clerk at the bail bonds office. The other file clerk quit after Vinnie attempted to sexually harass her. Lula is a quick file clerk, and this frequently allows her the time to accompany Stephanie when she is going after bonded clients who have not shown up for their court appearance (known colloquially as Failure to Appear, or FTAs). By the 11th book, Lula has worked her way up into being a full-time bounty hunter and takes over for Stephanie after she quits working as a bounty hunter. Eventually Stephanie returns to the job, and Lula goes back to being the file clerk and Stephanie's sometime partner. By the 22nd book office filing is largely digital, so a file clerk is no longer needed, though she retains the job title. She appeared in the film adaptation of One for the Money, Lula is played by Sherri Shepherd.

=== Connie Rosolli ===
Connie is Vinnie's receptionist/office manager. Her ties to the Mafia are hinted at but never fully explored. She is short and curvy with a hairy upper lip. Stephanie went to school with her little sister Tina. She is occasionally described as Betty Boop with a moustache. In the One for the Money film, she is played by Ana Reeder.

=== Mary Lou ===
Mary Lou Stankovic is Stephanie's best friend. Married to Lenny Stankovic with children and a dog. Stephanie occasionally pays her a visit, usually to talk about Morelli. Maiden name is Mary Lou Molnar. In the film, Mary Lou is played by Annie Parisse and Lenny by Danny Mastrogiorgio.

=== Vinnie Plum ===
Vinnie is the owner of Vincent Plum's Bail Bonds, where Stephanie is employed. He is also Stephanie's cousin, and he can barely tolerate his employees. He's rumored to have had romantic relationships with farm animals and is usually locked away in his office talking with his bookie; taking a snooze or having a conversation with his "Johnson". In the film he played by Patrick Fischler.

== Family ==
=== Grandma Mazur ===
Grandma Mazur is Stephanie's maternal grandmother. In Two For The Dough her real name is revealed to be Edna. She has lived in Stephanie's parents' house ever since her husband died of heart failure. In Lean Mean Thirteen Grandma Mazur uses his real name: Harry. She is a woman unwilling to grow old, ever. Stephanie relates to Grandma Mazur more than any other member of her family. Beginning in Two For the Dough, Grandma Mazur begins to tag along on cases with Stephanie, often pulling a gun out of her purse at inappropriate moments. Grandma Mazur also frequents the local funeral parlors because they are the social centers of the neighborhood. She sometimes peeks underneath the casket lid to see the dead body, causing hysteria in the parlor. Grandma Mazur is also the official owner of Big Blue, a '53 powder blue Buick that men love and women hate. The car is virtually indestructible, and Grandma Mazur got it from Stephanie's Grand Uncle Sandor. She moved in with Stephanie for a short period of time during Hot Six. She also occasionally watches pay-per-view porn, on account that "The Weather Channel doesn't have enough action".

In several interviews, Evanovich says that Grandma Mazur is "loosely based on my Aunt Lena and my Grandma Fanny," adding "She's who I want to be when I grow up."

In the film she is played by Debbie Reynolds.

=== Valerie ===
Valerie, Stephanie's older sister who moved to California after getting married, is mentioned briefly in the first six books as being the perfect daughter. For the first six books, Valerie lived in California. In Seven Up, Valerie moves back in with her parents after a failed marriage, her two daughters—Angie and Mary Alice—in tow. Angie is much like Valerie was at her age, and Mary Alice has a vivid imagination more like her Aunt Stephanie. Valerie tries to become a lesbian in book seven but doesn't like it. Her husband is mentioned, but never appears in the books, as having run away with Angie's and Mary Alice's babysitter. In Hard Eight, Valerie becomes bumbling lawyer Albert Kloughn's receptionist, and the two begin a relationship. In Visions of Sugar Plums Valerie becomes pregnant with Kloughn's daughter, whom they name Lisa. In Eleven on Top, Valerie and Kloughn cancel their wedding after a stressful bout of wedding planning, but are eventually tricked into getting married in Plum Lovin' after Val gets pregnant with Kloughn's second child.

=== Stephanie's parents ===
Her mother, Helen (or Ellen) and father, Frank, have the type of relationship built to last. Her father gets served first in exchange for getting to pretend he controls the house, and to keep him from stabbing Grandma Mazur with his fork. Her mother gets to cook and rule the house. Her mother thinks Stephanie should have a relationship like hers but Steph is skittish about marrying again. Her mother also wants Stephanie to get a nice, safe job and reminds her regularly, "They're hiring at the button factory!" Her father seems less concerned about Stephanie and her job. Stephanie's father also drives a cab part-time to get away from Grandma Mazur and, later in the series, Valerie and Albert Kloughn when they move into Stephanie's parents' house. In the film they are played by Debra Monk and Louis Mustillo respectively.

=== Bob ===
Bob is a big Golden Retriever a policeman acquaintance conned Stephanie into dog-sitting for in Hot Six. The arrangement becomes permanent when the owner refuses to reclaim the dog, and Bob becomes a part of Stephanie's life. By Seven Up, Bob has decided to move in with Joe Morelli, and he and Stephanie now have shared ownership of him. Bob has been described as a big, orange bottomless pit. He'll eat just about anything (including various items of clothing—thongs, socks, shoes, etc.) and usually leaves big dog piles wherever he goes… which is why Stephanie likes to walk him on Joyce Barnhardt's lawn.

=== Rex ===
Stephanie's roommate/hamster. Spends most of his time sleeping in his soup can or running on his wheel. Known to bite when scared or frightened.

After 25 books, Rex is becoming notable as fiction's oldest hamster.

== Romantic relationships ==
=== Joseph Morelli ===
Joe Morelli is Stephanie's on-and-off boyfriend, a former bad boy turned vice cop. He is also known as Officer Hottie or the Italian Stallion. Her history with Morelli started with a "choo choo" incident when she was six. At the age of sixteen, Stephanie lost her virginity to Morelli in the Tasty Pastry shop behind the éclair stand, after which he never called (but left quite a few flattering messages in bathroom and stadium walls around town). Three years later she saw Morelli and ran over him with her father's Buick, breaking his leg. A few years later in One for the Money Morelli was suspected of murder and was her first FTA, and Stephanie chased him around town, much to his annoyance. Eventually, she turns him in (after locking him in a freezer truck with three bodies) and clears his name. In Three To Get Deadly, she notices that he's stopped flirting and trying to get her into bed. After she asks him why, Morelli claims that "A man would have to be a total masochist to be interested in you", but by the end, he is interested in her again. Their relationship has since evolved into a romance that runs alternately passionately hot and ice cold.

At various times, both Stephanie and Morelli have seriously considered marriage, but never at the same time. They both know they are not ready for commitment, but often comment on the idea together and have lived together more than once. Their relationship runs cold as a result of many arguments—usually over her job (she has been known to stress Morelli enough that he takes Rolaids & Maalox and tells her that he is quickly deteriorating because of her) and they eventually lead to her relationship with Ranger. Being that both were born and bred in Trenton, whatever happens to/around her usually has a number of people calling Morelli to inform him—cars being blown up, bodies being found, etc. He has said that he does not even need to listen to the radio anymore; he knows she is always involved (usually by some illegal means) and that he always gets calls about her and the latest situation she is in. By the later books, Morelli has resignedly accepted it to be almost normal, but it does not make him any less stressed or worried.

Morelli has told her that he trusts her, but he doesn't trust Ranger (same with Diesel) and she often has bouts of jealousy when Morelli's name is said with other women. She has been prone to sneaking around his house to spy when that happens. Later on, it appears that Morelli has finally accepted her job (not so much the Ranger part), but it does not make him worry less or try less to protect her. In the more recent books, he often tag-teams with Ranger for her protection, much to her extreme annoyance at being shuffled back and forth between the two men like luggage.

Stephanie also often stays at his house, which he inherited from his Aunt Rose. She comments on how he is different from his infamous Morelli male relatives and has domesticated since his "wild-oat sowing days". In Seven Up, Stephanie and Joe announced their engagement under pressure from their families, but called off the wedding in book seven. When asked if Stephanie and Morelli will end up in a permanent relationship, Evanovich responds, "I don't want to tie Stephanie down to Morelli yet. Maybe some day, but certainly not for several more books."

In Twelve Sharp, Stephanie is finally able to tell Morelli that she loves him, but omits the part about how she loves Ranger as well.

In book 14 Stephanie spends most of her time at Morrellis house. She is taking care of Zook who is thought to be Loretta and Joe's kid. In the end of the book, Zook turns out to not be Joe's kid.

I'm Finger lickin Fifteen, Stephanie and Joe are on the outs. In the beginning of the book she explains "we had a disagreement over peanut butter that turned into a disagreement over everything under the sun, and we haven’t seen each other since"

In explosive eighteen Morelli and Stephanie are on the outs after Morelli catches Stephanie with Ranger in Hawaii. Ranger and Morelli get in a fight resulting in Morelli breaking his nose and black eyes. Ranger got 7 stitches and a broken bone in his hand.

In book 22, Morelli breaks up with Stephanie while they are naked in bed. He claims they need to date other people although she isn't allowed to date Ranger. Morelli gets mad when Stephanie calls Ranger first when Lula goes missing. By the end of book 22 they have reunited and Morelli wants to be engaged to be engaged.

In book 23 while at Disney world with Ranger, Stephanie is told by Ranger “Babe, he’s been stringing you along since you were five years old. You’re no closer to marriage with him than you were in kindergarten.” Stephanie has an epiphany and states "In fact, we didn’t talk about it ever. He avoided dinner with my parents so he didn’t have to talk about marriage. The subject never came up between us. Not even during intimate moments. Plus, there was the billiard table. Initially I thought he was saving his money to buy me a ring, but he bought the table with the money. Face facts, Stephanie, when a man is thinking about marriage and starting a family he doesn’t replace his dining-room table with a billiard table. Besides, I don’t even like billiards"

In the movie, One for the Money, Joe Morelli is played by actor Jason O'Mara.

=== Ranger ===
Ranger is Stephanie's fellow bounty hunter and tutor and sometimes known as "Batman" because of his mysterious ways. He’s close to six foot, one way or the other, is Latino, with medium brown skin and dark brown hair cut short. His teeth are white and even, and he has a killer smile that is seen only on special occasions. He dresses in black. His given name is Carlos Manoso. His street name, Ranger, is a holdover from time spent in Special Forces. These days, he does the occasional high-risk bond enforcement job, and is the managing partner of a security firm located in a stealth building in center city. Ranger is Cuban-American, and drives a rotation of very expensive black cars—including a black Porsche 911 Turbo (Stephanie has lingering questions about the origin of Ranger's car-supply, but he will only say "Don't ask"). He is the C.E.O. of RangeMan Enterprises, LLC, a security company (among other things). Ranger's real name is Ricardo Carlos Manoso; in High Five, it is revealed that he has a daughter named Julie. Julie's mother is named Rachel and her stepfather is named Ron; Ranger got Rachel pregnant one night when he was in the military and on leave. Ranger married her and gave the baby his name and financial support. The two were divorced when the baby was born, but he visits when invited.

Stephanie's relationship with Ranger, somewhere between boyfriend/girlfriend and teacher/pupil, provides much of her day-to-day stress, along with the almost constant threat of car bombing. Ranger says he loves Stephanie "in his own way" but is not the marrying type. Regardless of his rivalry with Morelli, he has said that "Morelli is a good man" and is the marrying type Stephanie wants. Ranger does high-dollar or high-risk recovery for Vinnie, and sometimes lends Stephanie a hand with some of the more dangerous or slippery FTAs. He often assigns employees to guard or track her when she is in serious danger. Ranger "bleeds money" every time Stephanie requires protection, which is frequently; she minds, but he does not so much—she actually appears as a line item in his budget (where she is listed under "entertainment"). In some of the later novels, Stephanie moonlights for RangeMan during safety or financial dilemmas. As a result of him often coming to her aid or rescue, she has built up quite a tab with him and he has said that one day, he will collect. Later on in the series (after their one night as lovers) Ranger amends his statement; saying there was no tab for what they give each other.

She also has a key to his seventh-floor apartment and sometimes goes there when she feels threatened. To him and his Merry Men, Stephanie is considered his "personal property" and he often tag-teams with Morelli for her protection. By "Twelve Sharp", after being kidnapped with Julie by a Ranger copycat, Stephanie realizes that she loves both Morelli and Ranger. More than once, she has acknowledged that she cannot ever have the full family life she wants with Ranger (he has made it clear more than once that he will not settle down), but continues to associate with him anyway—much to Morelli's dismay.In Smokin Seventeen Stephanie and Ranger sleep together many times including in his Porche 911.

On explosive eighteen Ranger and Stephanie spends time together in Hawaii. Morelli and Ranger get in a fight. Ranger ends up with seven stitches and a broken bone in his hand.

In book twenty three Stephanie sleeps with Ranger at the contemporary resort Disney World after spending the day at Magic Kingdom. She wears Tinkerbell underwear for him.

In the movie One for the Money, Ranger is played by actor Daniel Sunjata.

=== Diesel Diesel ===
Diesel appears in the four holiday novellas: Visions of Sugar Plums, Plum Lovin', Plum Lucky, and Plum Spooky, as well as in Hardcore Twenty-Four. Originally born Swiss, he is described as "over six feet of gorgeous, hard-muscled, slightly tanned male" with brown eyes and thick, unruly sandy blond hair with a dangerous set of dimples. Although not nearly as significant as Morelli and Ranger, Diesel and Stephanie share a mild flirtation. But like Morelli and Ranger, he also has affectionate nicknames for her and is just as every bit amused at the situations she finds herself in. He has special abilities and his job is to track down fugitives with supernatural abilities, called Unmentionables. He pops up every once in a while in Stephanie's life and always sleeps in her bed when he is in town (staying at her apartment and sometimes going over to dinner at her parents'). In Plum Lucky, when Stephanie mentions Diesel to Ranger, Ranger shows exasperation and when asked if he does not like Diesel, simply says, "We don't hang out together." After finding out about Stephanie's involvement with Diesel, Ranger warns her about Diesel's enemies. Stephanie has made it clear that she is not looking for a relationship (already possessing a boyfriend, to whom she is "practically married" Twelve Sharp, and another, even more mysterious man in her life, whom she has admitted she also loves), but it hardly stops Diesel from making moves—sleeping on top of her in bed, somehow stealing her bra (while she is still wearing it), etc.

In Plum Spooky, Stephanie and Diesel babysit Carl the monkey and get stuck caring for other monkeys they pick up as well. When Ranger finds out that Diesel has been carting the monkeys around, he "looked like he might burst out laughing again." After she is seen with him at Pino's in Plum Spooky, Morelli gets several calls informing him and is also none too happy about Diesel's living arrangements with her when he is around. But like Morelli, Diesel resorted to Pepto-Bismol worrying over Stephanie's safety in "Plum Spooky" (after telling her he was getting an ulcer because of her). He thinks it is amusing that she is so gullible about his paranormal abilities. Despite her ongoing romantic entanglements with two men already, Diesel does not mind trying to get her into bed as well and he constantly flirts with her.

In 2010 Evanovich spun off Diesel into the "Wicked" series, Wicked Appetite (2010) and Wicked Business (2012). Carl the monkey is present, the villain, Gerwulf Grimoire (Wulf), and a new Diesel love interest, Lizzie Tucker, a preternatural cupcake baker.

The 2021 novel Game On: Tempting Twenty-Eight reveals that Diesel is the character's first and last name.

== Nemeses ==
=== Joyce Barnhardt ===
First referenced in One for the Money, and first appeared in Two for the Dough. Joyce is Stephanie's arch rival. She has picked on Stephanie ever since grade school, and still is an object of contempt after Stephanie caught her cheating with Dickie Orr, Stephanie's then-husband. Joyce also occasionally sleeps with Vinnie, who likes to spank her and make her bark like a dog. In turn Vinnie gives her a few cases to capture. Despite their mutual dislike, on several occasions, Joyce actually helps Stephanie out of bad situations, with the reason she would rather humiliate Stephanie than let a bad guy get her. In Finger Lickin' Fifteen, Joyce aggressively goes after Morelli (as he is then off with Stephanie) despite his desperate maneuvers to avoid her and he considers shooting her "just to get it over with." Joyce actually is shot in the chest toward the end of the novel, but survives.

=== Dickie Orr ===
First referenced in One for the Money, and first appeared in Two for the Dough. Dickie Orr is Stephanie's ex-husband. Marrying him was known as one of her stupid choices. Not even a year after they got married, Stephanie divorced him after finding him cheating on her with Joyce Barnhardt on her dining room table. The divorce was not at all friendly, and they stopped talking to each other. Dickie appears occasionally in the books and is a featured character in Lean Mean Thirteen when he vanishes after a public argument with Stephanie, making her a suspect in his disappearance.

=== Grandma Bella ===
First appeared in "Two for the Dough" referred to as Vinnie's Grandma Bella and later was Joe Morelli's grandma. She tends to be a little kooky at best. She gives Stephanie the "eye" and likes to make predictions about Stephanie's future, especially with Morelli. Though her visions are normally morbid, there have been times, specifically in To the Nines, when Grandma Bella has been kind to Stephanie in her visions, telling her that she would not die until she was very old. In book 17, Bella puts the eye on Stephanie and later put the vordo curse on her which leads to Stephanie sleeping with Ranger.

=== Benito Ramirez ===
First appeared in One for the Money, and reappears in High Five. A boxer and homicidal rapist who brutalizes and sometimes kills women. Refers to himself in the third person as "The Champ". Introduced in One for the Money, in which he stalks Stephanie and almost kills Lula, and is incarcerated. He returns in the fifth book, High Five out on parole and proclaims to follow Jesus. He returns to finish what he started by stalking Stephanie again and is killed in her apartment by and during her confrontation with Allen Shempsky.

=== Terry Gilman ===
First appeared in Four to Score. Terry Gilman (né Grizoli), was prom queen at Stephanie's high school, who took Morelli as her date—two reasons for Stephanie to loathe her. After a brief career as a cheerleader for the New York Giants, and an equally brief marriage (from which she retains her married name), she has gone to work for her Mafia uncle Vito Grizoli as a "female wise guy". Morelli and Gilman sometimes act as the intermediaries when the Trenton police and the Trenton mob need information from each other, but this contact grates on Stephanie's nerves, since she knows Gilman still carries a torch for Morelli.

== Supporting characters ==
=== Moon-Man ===
Walter "Moon-Man" or "The Mooner" Dunphy went to high school with Stephanie, where he was considered the class stoner. He has made appearances in Hot Six, Seven Up (as a major character), Fearless Fourteen, Sizzling Sixteen and Smokin' Seventeen. In Seven Up, the Mooner lives with another man named Dougie, who sells hijacked goods to people. He is a known "Trekkie", and he hosts a Star Trek party which is ruined when Stephanie tries to arrest a man dressed as Captain Kirk. In Fearless Fourteen, Moon-Man appears as a character who plays an online video game called Minion Fire with Morelli's distant cousin, Mario (who is known as "Zook"), and Grandma Mazur ("Scorch") and her friends. By then, he has also cleaned up his act and no longer does drugs.

=== Sally Sweet ===
Salvatore Sweet is a cross-dresser who first appears in Four to Score as a person who solves a series of word puzzles for one of Stephanie's cases. At this time, he is part of a transvestite rock band called "The Lovelies". He joins Stephanie and Lula during a takedown, which (naturally) does not go as planned. He helps Valerie and Albert Kloughn plan their wedding during Ten Big Ones and Eleven on Top, during which time he also drives a school bus. He saves Stephanie from the Comstock Street Slayers at the end of Ten Big Ones, running over or shooting down most of the gang members with an UZI. He and Lula are performing together in a band called The What in Twelve Sharp (Grandma Mazur briefly joins the band as well).

=== Eddie Gazarra ===
Eddie Gazarra, a Trenton cop, grew up in the same neighborhood as Stephanie. He is usually called in when Stephanie blows up a car or finds a dead body. Eddie is married to Stephanie's cousin Shirley-the-Whiner. Eddie is also usually one of the first people on the scene when something happens to Stephanie.

=== Tank ===
Tank is Ranger's right-hand man. He is pure muscle, and starting in Twelve Sharp, he starts going out with Lula. By Fearless Fourteen, Lula and Tank are engaged after she tricks him. The engagement is called off in Plum Spooky. Tank owns cats and Lula is allergic. Summarized in Takedown Twenty, "A while back he dated Lula, but Lula was allergic to his cats, and Tank wasn’t giving up his cats for love or money or Lula."

In Fearless Fourteen, it is implied that Tank is African-American. This is indicated by the sentence in Chapter Five, "Tank's eyes were blank and his face went gray under the brown." However, brown is a rather generic descriptor, so it could also indicate that he is Hispanic.

In Book 5 when Tank is first introduced he is in a group of three men, two African-American and one undetermined. The undetermined man speaks and it is not Tank. It is also later mentioned in Fearless Fourteen, he is definitely African-American.

In Lean Mean Thirteen, while Tank is in the hospital after being shot, we learn that his real first name is Pierre. Although, according to Ranger, "Tank isn't overly fond of being named Pierre."

In To The Nines, Tank is ordered by Ranger to be Stephanie's guard.

=== Randy Briggs ===
First appeared in High Five. Briggs is a little person and a computer programmer. After Stephanie trashes his apartment while trying to apprehend him, he moves into her apartment, and the two eventually become friends and sometimes allies, though he has "the personality of a hyperactive raccoon." Stephanie sometimes uses him as a helper for odd jobs that require a person of his stature.

=== Joe Juniak ===
Juniak was once a Trenton police officer, but during the series he has been mayor of Trenton. He was running for a state position as well.

=== Mrs. Bestler ===
Mrs. Bestler is a senior citizen who lives in Stephanie's building. She enjoys playing "Elevator Operator" and she sometimes forgets where she lives.

=== Dillon Ruddick ===
Dillon is the building supervisor at Stephanie's apartment building. He lives in the basement, and on numerous occasions, he has helped Stephanie take care of her unit in exchange for a six-pack.

=== Constantine Stiva ===
Stiva owned his own funeral parlor, known as the best in the Burg. The original building burned down after Stephanie and Grandma Mazur were cornered by Kenny Mancuso and his goons in Two for the Dough. In Eleven on Top, Stiva, acting as his stepson (who died in the fire), threatens Stephanie, who is getting close to spoiling his plans to retrieve some loot he and some companions stole years before. He causes Stephanie to burn down the Cluck-in-a-Bucket that she was working at. He is arrested, and in later books, his funeral parlor is being run by two gay men.

== Car death ==
Stephanie is infamous for destroying cars, for which she has been dubbed the "Bombshell Bounty Hunter" in the local paper. She has had cars repossessed, stolen, stripped, wrecked, crushed by burning garbage trucks, and smashed into little cubes. Over time, she has had to resort to a truck with a bad radiator, a mismatch of two cars called a Rollswagen, and a series of other clunkers. Ranger often supplies her with a high-end SUV or sports car, but these fare no better than her other vehicles. To her regret, Stephanie is often forced to resort to her late Great-Uncle Sandor's seemingly indestructible, powder blue 1953 Buick Roadmaster, aka "Big Blue", that now belongs to Grandma Mazur. Most men admire Big Blue as a classic; Stephanie hates it, considering it unwieldy and a gas hog, not to mention much too conspicuous, but more often than she likes, she finds herself driving it. Big Blue's biggest advantage (as far as Stephanie is concerned) is that it seems to be nearly indestructible; every accident Plum has been in with the car has resulted in either no damage or only scratches to the paint (even when the other car is smashed inwards); even a bomb attached to the car failed to explode. Stephanie quoted that if the seat was taken out that, "It would probably regenerate". This car is based on the car on which Evanovich learned to drive.

== Bibliography ==
- Evanovich, Janet (1995). One For the Money.
- Evanovich, Janet (1996). Two For the Dough.
- Evanovich, Janet (1997). Three to Get Deadly.
- Evanovich, Janet (1997). The Last Peep. (Short Story)
- Evanovich, Janet (1998). Four to Score.
- Evanovich, Janet (1999). High Five.
- Evanovich, Janet (2000). Hot Six.
- Evanovich, Janet (2001). Seven Up.
- Evanovich, Janet (2002). Hard Eight.
- Evanovich, Janet (2003). Visions of Sugar Plums. A short Christmas special.
- Evanovich, Janet (2003). To the Nines.
- Evanovich, Janet (2004). Ten Big Ones.
- Evanovich, Janet (2005). Eleven on Top.
- Evanovich, Janet (2006). Twelve Sharp.
- Evanovich, Janet (2007). Plum Lovin'.
- Evanovich, Janet (2007). Lean Mean Thirteen.
- Evanovich, Janet (2008). Plum Lucky.
- Evanovich, Janet (2008). Fearless Fourteen.
- Evanovich, Janet (2009). Plum Spooky.
- Evanovich, Janet (2009). Finger Lickin' Fifteen.
- Evanovich, Janet (2010). Sizzling Sixteen.
- Evanovich, Janet (2011). Smokin' Seventeen.
- Evanovich, Janet (2011). Explosive Eighteen.
- Evanovich, Janet (2012). Notorious Nineteen.
- Evanovich, Janet (2013). Takedown Twenty.
- Evanovich, Janet (2014). Top Secret Twenty-one.
- Evanovich, Janet (2015). Tricky Twenty-two.
- Evanovich, Janet (2016). Turbo Twenty-three.
- Evanovich, Janet (2017). Hardcore Twenty-four.
- Evanovich, Janet (2018). Look Alive Twenty-Five.
- Evanovich, Janet (2019). Twisted Twenty-Six.
- Evanovich, Janet (2020). Fortune and Glory: Tantalizing Twenty-Seven.
- Evanovich, Janet (2021). Game On: Tempting Twenty Eight.
- Evanovich, Janet (2022). Going Rogue: Rise and Shine Twenty-Nine.
- Evanovich, Janet (2023). Dirty Thirty.
- Evanovich, Janet (2024). Now or Never: Thirty-One on the Run.
