= Sizzling Sixteen =

Novel by Janet Evanovich

- First edition
- Author: Janet Evanovich
- Language: English
- Series: Stephanie Plum
- Genre: Crime novel
- Publisher: St. Martin's Press
- Publication place: United States
- Media type: Print (Hardcover)
- Preceded by: Finger Lickin' Fifteen
- Followed by: Smokin' Seventeen

Sizzling Sixteen is a 2010 novel by Janet Evanovich, the sixteenth in the Stephanie Plum series.

== Plot Introduction ==
Stephanie's boss, her cousin Vinnie, has been abducted by his bookie, who demands that Vinnie pay back his gambling losses (more than a million dollars) in five days, or he's dead. Stephanie, Connie Rosoli and Lula must combine forces to rescue Vinnie and raise the money, especially after the bookie reveals that he and Vinnie are both in debt to someone much more powerful and much scarier.

== Plot summary ==
"Vinnie" of Vincent Plum Bail Bonds is kidnapped due to an outstanding debt of $786,000 to mobster Bobby Sunflower. Vinnie is the dubious and sex pervert cousin of Stephanie Plum's. With nobody else willing to pay to get Vinnie back, Stephanie and her girls, Lula and Connie, only have 5 days to raise the money and pay back Vinnie's debt to save him. To do this Stephanie, Lula and Connie all need to dive headfirst into the criminal underbelly of Trenton, New Jersey, to find and apprehend Vinnie's outstanding FTA's (failure to appears) that include a man wanted for polygamy, a turnpike toilet paper bandit, and a drug dealer with a pet alligator named Mr. Jingles.

Lula and Connie want Stephanie to ask for help from her on and off again boyfriend Jo Morelli, Trenton's hottest detective. However, Stephanie does not want to seek help from Morelli because the bookie holding Vinnie is not exactly kosher and she and Morelli are currently in an 'off' stage of their relationship. This only leaves security expert Ranger, Stephanie's long term mentor and Morelli's competition, to go to for help. To start with Stephanie needs to find and rescue Vinnie, as well as all her FTA's. However, Morelli finds Stephanie first, at their favourite bakery and offers to help and provides Stephanie with information and further help, if Stephanie asks for it. Later, Ranger also offers help in tracking persons of interest, with his gadgets. Stephanie continues to hold Ranger at arms length to maintain her possible reconciliation with Morelli, not yet wanting to give up what her and Morelli have/could have together.

Asking for help from Morelli and Ranger is a question and circumstance that keeps coming up for Stephanie throughout this adventure. Stephanie however resists the urge to seek help from both her favourite men in her life and goes it alone with her gal-pals Lula and Connie. In the end Stephanie needs to be rescued by Ranger, Morelli and Mooner's merry hobbits, after being kidnapped by Vinnie's former creditors.
