= Plum Lovin' =

2007 novel by Janet Evanovich

- First edition
- Author: Janet Evanovich
- Language: English
- Series: Stephanie Plum
- Genre: Crime novel
- Publisher: St. Martin's Press
- Publication date: January 9, 2007
- Publication place: United States
- Media type: Print (Hardcover)
- Pages: 176 pages
- ISBN: 978-0-312-30634-2
- OCLC: 76864675
- Dewey Decimal: 813/.54 22
- LC Class: PS3555.V2126 P56 2007b
- Preceded by: Twelve Sharp
- Followed by: Lean Mean Thirteen and Plum Lucky

Plum Lovin' is a 2007 novel by American writer Janet Evanovich. It is the 14th book in the Stephanie Plum series. The audiobook is narrated by Lorelei King.

== Plot summary ==
The story takes place on Valentine's Day where bounty hunter Stephanie Plum is tracking down Annie Hart, a relationship expert, who was charged with armed robbery. According to Stephanie's file, Hart stole a necklace from a pawn shop owned by Stanley Cramp and shot him in the foot. Vinnie is worried that if Hart isn't brought in soon he won't be able to afford the big champagne in the Valentine's Day cruise he is supposed to take with his wife Lucille.

Diesel is back and he's hunting down Bernie Beaner. Bernie's marriage of thirty-five years has apparently ended and he's blaming Annie Hart for it. Until Diesel can take care of Bernie Beaner, he's keeping Annie Hart in protective custody. The only problem is that Annie won't give up her work and has Diesel promise to make sure all of her clients have a good Valentine's Day. Diesel passes this task off to Stephanie for a hundred dollars and a promise that she won't have to do anything illegal or life-threatening.

=== Annie Hart's Cases ===
Annie Hart has five cases that Stephanie and Diesel work their way through while they hunt down Bernie Beaner. Charlene Klinger is forty-two years old, divorced with four children, originally from New Hampshire and works for the DMV. Her deadbeat ex-husband is on a beach in Santa Barbara and hasn't sent child support in over a year. When Diesel visits Stephanie at her house a cat's tail catches on fire. Diesel manages to put out the fire with orange juice but then a dog slips and hurts his leg. Early on a Saturday morning and it would be expensive to go to an emergency clinic. Luckily, Stephanie knows someone who can help.

Gary Martin is a forty-year-old, five foot and six inches tall, bald and chubby veterinarian who has never been married. Larry Burlew is a six-foot-tall, 230 pound, soft spoken and very shy butcher. Jeanine Chan is thirty-five and involved with a guy, however she continues to run into a problem with men and needs help to fix it.

Albert Kloughn is a bald, Jewish lawyer who works next to a laundromat, and looks similar to the Pillsbury dough boy. Albert and Stephanie's sister Valerie have one daughter together, named Lisa. Albert and Valerie have tried to get married but ran away to Disneyland instead. Valerie is pregnant again and Stephanie is absolutely determined to get Albert to marry her sister. Stephanie says that she is marrying Diesel at her parents' house to get Valerie and Albert there while Annie gets the paperwork and the Justice of the Peace, and Lula and Connie get a wedding cake. After a quick place change and faster vows, Valerie and Albert are finally married.
