= One for the Money (novel) =

1994 crime novel by Janet Evanovich

- 1994 Paperback cover
- Author: Janet Evanovich
- Language: English
- Series: Stephanie Plum
- Genre: Crime novel
- Publisher: St. Martin's Press
- Publication date: August 26, 1994
- Publication place: United States
- Media type: Print (Hardcover, Paperback)
- Pages: 288 pp.
- ISBN: 0-684-19639-5
- OCLC: 29634364
- Dewey Decimal: 813/.54 20
- LC Class: PS3555.V2126 O5 1994
- Followed by: Two for the Dough

One for the Money is the first novel by Janet Evanovich featuring the bounty hunter Stephanie Plum. It was published in 1994 in the United States and in 1995 in Great Britain. Like its successors, Two for the Dough and Three to Get Deadly, One for the Money is a long-time best-seller, appearing for 75 consecutive weeks on the USA Today list of 150 best-selling novels, peaking at number 13.

Before this novel, Evanovich wrote 11 category romance novels. She then "ran out of sexual positions and decided to move into the mystery genre." Before writing One for the Money, her first mystery novel, Evanovich spent two years investigating the world of law enforcement, shadowing both bail enforcement agents and the Trenton police, observing their actions and the equipment they carried. She also learned how to shoot a gun.

One for the Money was named a New York Times Notable Book, a Publishers Weekly "Best Book of 1994," and a USA Today "Best Bet." For this book, Evanovich also won the 1995 Dilys Award, one of only three authors to do so for their first mystery (the others being Julia Spencer-Fleming and Louise Penny).

This novel introduced characters that would frequent the subsequent novels. As of 2020, there have been 27 published novels, four novellas, and one short story in the Stephanie Plum series.

== Plot summary ==
Stephanie Plum, laid off from her job as a lingerie buyer for a Newark department store, applies for a filing job with her cousin Vinnie, a bail bondsman. Vinnie's assistant, Connie, tells her the job is taken, but suggests she work as a bounty hunter, apprehending clients who have failed to appear for their court dates. Stephanie is excited to learn that Joe Morelli, a Trenton vice cop and onetime sexual acquaintance of hers, is FTA and facing charges for murder one. Vinnie initially refuses to give her a job, but Morelli's bounty is $10,000, which Stephanie desperately needs, so she blackmails Vinnie into employing her, by threatening to expose his "addiction to kinky sex" to his unsuspecting wife.

Staking out Morelli's apartment, Stephanie follows his cousin, Mooch, to Morelli's hideout and finds him quickly, but is humiliated when he laughs off her demand that she come with him, pointing out (correctly) that she has neither the equipment nor the training to apprehend an unwilling fugitive. Connie puts her in touch with Vinnie's "star" bounty hunter, Ricardo Manoso, a.k.a. "Ranger", who gives her a crash-course in bounty hunting. He also buys Stephanie her first gun, a compact Smith & Wesson revolver, and fills her in on Morelli's alleged crime: shooting an unarmed man, Ziggy Kuleska, at the apartment of a prostitute, Carmen Sanchez. Morelli claims that Ziggy was armed and Morelli shot him in self-defense, but no gun was recovered at the crime scene. Stephanie's friend, police officer Eddie Gazarra, advises her that Morelli is likely going around Trenton, trying to find witnesses who will clear his name, so her best bet at finding him is to follow the same trail.

Stephanie's first stop is a boxing gym on Stark Street (Trenton's roughest neighborhood) to interview champion boxer Benito Ramirez and his manager Jimmy Alpha, both known associates of Ziggy Kuleska. Her interview with Ramirez quickly turns ugly when he assaults her, but she is rescued by Morelli, who disappears almost as quickly as he appeared.

Exploring Morelli's apartment with Ranger, Stephanie decides to "commandeer" Morelli's Jeep Grand Cherokee, counting on trapping him when he tries to steal it back. Instead, he catches her unaware in the shower and leaves her handcuffed, naked, to the curtain rod, forcing her to call Ranger for help.

She continues to follow the trail of possible witnesses to Morelli's crime, but is shaken when two of the witnesses are later found dead, and Lula, a prostitute working on Stark Street that she spoke with, is hung outside her apartment window, raped and beaten nearly to death. When Stephanie returns home from the hospital, Morelli is there, and offers her a deal: his movements have become too restricted, so if she helps him investigate and clear his name, he will let her bring him into custody and collect the bounty.

While he is hiding in her apartment, Vinnie's regular bounty hunter, Morty Beyers, comes by and requests his case files back, since he's recovered from his appendicitis. He also steals the keys to Morelli's SUV from Stephanie's purse, thinking to lure Morelli to him in the same way. Instead, Morty is killed when a car bomb destroys the SUV, proving that whatever Stephanie is investigating is making someone angry or nervous.

At a butcher shop that Ziggy Kuleska was known to frequent, Stephanie is shocked to recognize the "flat-nose" guy behind the counter as the witness Morelli described at the scene of Ziggy's death. They follow him to a moored boat, and Morelli finds traces of heroin that link the boat to the illegal drug traffic run by a local Jamaican gang. They then follow the trail to a freezer truck, where they find oil drums containing the bodies of Carmen and the witness. Morelli despairs, knowing that this has practically eliminated the chances of him clearing his name. Stephanie advocates calling the police, but Morelli refuses, tossing in a remark about her ineptitude as a bounty hunter that stings her into locking him in the freezer truck and driving it to the police station to hand him over.

Returning home, Stephanie is held at gunpoint by Jimmy Alpha, who she had taken to be a helpless bystander. Ruefully, he tells her that managing a champion boxer like Ramirez is every promoter's dream, but Ramirez has become a sadistic psychopath, and Alpha can't control him any longer. Alpha has tried to "diversify" by using his earnings from Ramirez to buy other businesses, such as the butcher shop, but was lured into using his boat and his businesses to assist in the Jamaicans' drug trade. Carmen was on the verge of telling the truth to Morelli, which is why Ziggy killed her before Morelli arrived, and the now-dead witness took Ziggy's gun after Morelli shot him. Now Stephanie is too close to the truth, which is why Alpha will have to have Ramirez rape and torture her to death, before Alpha shoots him and retires peacefully. Stephanie shoves Alpha to the ground, taking a bullet in her rear end from Alpha's gun, before grabbing her purse and emptying her revolver into Alpha's heart.

Thanks to a microphone hidden on her by Morelli, Alpha's confession was recorded and clears Morelli's name, though Stephanie still receives the capture fee from Vinnie. Morelli visits her apartment with a conciliatory pizza, adding that Ramirez has been arrested and indicted. He also asks if she will continue working for Vinnie, and she says she probably will. The experience has rekindled their attraction for each other, and he tries to make amends by apologizing for writing a lewd poem about her on the stadium wall. Stephanie, who only knew about the poem on the wall of the local delicatessen, gets furious all over again.

=== Car death(s) ===
- Stephanie's Mazda Miata: repossessed;
- Morelli's Jeep Grand Cherokee: destroyed by a car bomb.

=== Failure-to-Appear (FTA) assignments ===
- Joe Morelli: First degree murder
- Clarence Sampson: DUI
- Lonnie Dodd: auto theft
- William Earling: indecent exposure

== Film adaptation ==
A film adaptation was produced by Tom Rosenberg for Lakeshore Entertainment, with Katherine Heigl playing the role of Stephanie Plum. Additional cast members included Jason O'Mara as Morelli, Sherri Shepherd as Lula, Daniel Sunjata as Ranger, Patrick Fischler as Vinnie Plum, John Leguizamo as Jimmy Alpha, and Debbie Reynolds as Grandma Mazur. Describing the fit of her books to film, Janet explained, 'I'm an entertainer.. When I write, it's a movie to me. I even started doing dialogue by going on stage and doing improv.'

The film was released on January 27, 2012 to universally negative reviews from critics and was a box office disappointment.

== Development ==
Janet Evanovich started the Stephanie Plum series after writing a series of romance novels. She wrote Stephanie as 'sassy and smart-mouthed', the 'Indiana Jones of Trenton'. The mystery genre appealed to her as a way to include humor, romance and adventure in her work.

== Critical reception ==
Publishers Weekly's positive review noted One for the Money for its humor, as well as its dialogue: 'astute and raunchy,'

== Awards and nominations ==
One for the Money won the 1995 Dilys Award presented by the Independent Mystery Booksellers Association.
