= Eleven on Top =

2005 novel by Janet Evanovich

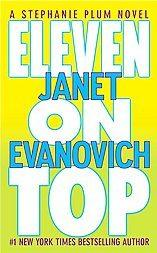
- 2005 Paperback Cover
- Author: Janet Evanovich
- Language: English
- Series: Stephanie Plum
- Genre: Crime novel
- Publisher: St. Martin's Press
- Publication date: June 21, 2005
- Publication place: United States
- Media type: Print (Hardcover, Paperback)
- Pages: 288 pp
- ISBN: 0-7553-2803-5
- OCLC: 62264158
- Preceded by: Ten Big Ones
- Followed by: Twelve Sharp

Eleven on Top is the 11th novel by Janet Evanovich featuring the bounty hunter Stephanie Plum. It was published in June 2005, and quickly became a #1 best-seller, remaining on the USA Today list of 150 best-selling novels for 19 weeks.

== Plot summary ==
Stephanie Plum has had enough - enough of grappling with fugitives in garbage piles, enough of being constantly shot at, and enough of having her cars blown up on a semi-regular basis. So she quits her job as a bail enforcement agent and resolves to get a normal job and a normal life. However, events conspire against her. Her three attempts at a normal job - working at a button factory, the Kan-Kleen Dry-Cleaning Service, and serving fast-food chicken at Cluck-in-a-Bucket - all end in disaster, partly because someone is, once again, attempting to kill her. It's someone she knows, and someone who knows her too well, but, as her on-again/off-again boyfriend, cop Joe Morelli points out, she's made a lot of enemies.

At the same time, Stephanie is trying to avoid having to wear an eggplant-colored gown as maid of honor at her sister Valerie's upcoming wedding. The wedding itself hits a snag when Valerie's hapless fiancé, lawyer Albert Kloughn, makes an insensitive remark about her weight at a family dinner, and she vows not to get married unless she can lose at least sixty pounds in less than ten days.

Stephanie becomes convinced that the man stalking her is Spiro Stiva, the fugitive son of the Burg's favorite undertaker, Constantine. Spiro disappeared when Stephanie and her Grandma Mazur inadvertently burned down the Stiva funeral home in Two for the Dough, and now it looks like Spiro is back for revenge.

- A car bomb claims Stephanie's Saturn as her ex-boss, Mama Macaroni, is trying to drive away in it;
- Stephanie's last customer at Cluck-in-a-Bucket heaves a bomb through the drive-through window, and Stephanie catches a glimpse of a heavily scarred face before he drives off.
- While escorting Grandma Mazur at a funeral viewing at Stiva's parlor, the same scarred man runs over Morelli with a car, breaking his leg.

Stephanie's mentor, ex-Special Forces mercenary Ranger Manoso, offers her a job with his security firm, running background checks on persons of interest. Despite her trepidation at being too close to Ranger, and the friction it causes with Morelli, she accepts for the security it offers her.

While running information searches, Stephanie discovers evidence linking Spiro's reappearance with the disappearance of four older men from the Burg, all of whom disappeared on the same day and were later found shot to death in a shallow grave outside Trenton. All four men were United States Army veterans, stationed at Fort Dix at the same time as Constantine Stiva.

In a fit of depression, Stephanie confides to Morelli that she quit her job as a bounty hunter because she feels "stupid and boring" - she has no career path, no hobbies, no strong interests, and nothing she's really good at. Morelli smiles and says that, while "stupid" is sometimes "a tough call," he finds her anything but boring.

While Stephanie's mother was complaining about Stephanie's lack of direction, Stephanie recklessly told her family a small lie, claiming that she can play the cello - and before she knew it, her mother has rented one for her to play at Valerie's wedding. Now she has to find a way out of that predicament as well. Fortunately for her, two events intervene on her behalf: a bomb blows up Morelli's garage (with the cello inside) on the night of the wedding reception; the next day, Valerie calls from the airport to cancel the wedding, as she, her three children, and Albert are all leaving for Disney World, and may not come back.

After driving Grandma Mazur to another viewing at the funeral home, Stephanie goes snooping through Constantine Stiva's attached house, looking for signs that Spiro is hiding out there. Then she is tazed unconscious and wakes up in a coffin, being wheeled into an abandoned house in Spiro's name. Her kidnapper turns out to be Constantine himself.

Spiro, he confides, died in the fire, but makes a convenient scapegoat for what Constantine had to do. Thirty-six years ago, he masterminded an armored car hijacking at Fort Dix; he and four Army buddies stole $7 million and hid it in a vault in the basement of the funeral home, doling out shares at 10-year intervals. It was arranged that all five of them were needed to open the vault, but Constantine eventually figured out the combination and "borrowed" from the stash from time to time, then had to take it all to rebuild his business after the funeral home burned down. A month ago, one of his accomplices was diagnosed with cancer and requested his entire remaining share of the money. Constantine called all of them to a meeting, ostensibly to vote on the distribution, and Constantine shot and buried them all. Now he has to kill Stephanie in order to complete the illusion that Spiro is the one responsible. He locks her in the basement and heads out to do one last Spiro impersonation.

Before he returns, Stephanie is rescued from the basement by Ranger and his crew, who have been looking non-stop for her in the six hours since she disappeared. Ranger pleads with Stephanie to go home and stay safe while he and his men stay behind to apprehend Constantine. He goes so far as to handcuff her to his right-hand man, Tank, who escorts her to Morelli's house before releasing her.

On the pretext of taking Morelli's dog, Bob, for a walk, Stephanie borrows her family's Buick and stakes out the Stiva house, while Ranger is lying in wait for him. When Constantine pulls into the garage, Stephanie rear-ends his car with the Buick, crushing the car and trapping Constantine behind the air bag. Stephanie tells Ranger she feels much better, and decides that, while learning to play the cello might be fun, she doesn't need to, as her life is already plenty interesting.
