= Finger Lickin' Fifteen =

Book by Janet Evanovich

- First edition
- Author: Janet Evanovich
- Language: English
- Series: Stephanie Plum
- Genre: Crime novel
- Publisher: St. Martin's Press
- Publication place: United States
- Media type: Print (Hardcover)
- Preceded by: Plum Spooky
- Followed by: Sizzling Sixteen

Finger Lickin' Fifteen is a 2009 novel by Janet Evanovich, the fifteenth in the Stephanie Plum series.

== Plot summary ==
Stephanie's friend Lula witnesses the murder (by decapitation) of celebrity chef Stanley Chipotle. When Chipotle's sponsors offer a $1 million reward for the capture of the killers, Lula decides to enter an upcoming BBQ cook-off contest, deciding that the most likely suspect is a rival chef. Despite her complete lack of culinary skills, she is joined by Stephanie's Grandma Mazur, their friend Connie Rosoli, and a reluctant Stephanie.

Several of Ranger's clients' homes have been burglarized, leading him to suspect one of his men. He asks Stephanie to resume her job at Rangeman, as a pretext for snooping around. He also offers to lend his considerable skills as a bounty hunter to helping her do her regular job.

While Lula attempts to perfect her "skills" as a chef, she is attacked several times by Chipotle's (extremely inept) killers, but manages to escape each time, though she is forced to move in with Stephanie, and later with the Plum family, and her prized Pontiac Firebird is destroyed by a poorly constructed car bomb.

On the day of the cook-off, one of the killers, "Marco the Maniac" is caught trying to flee to the airport. He identifies his accomplice as the cook-off's emcee, a vice president of the sauce company that employed Chipotle. The emcee holds Lula hostage at gunpoint and confesses: Chipotle was having an affair with the company president's wife, who planned to divorce her husband and carry half his assets to a new company founded with Chipotle. The killing and the reward were intended to be a publicity stunt that would both rid them of Chipotle and generate media attention to the company. Lula manages to disarm and subdue the emcee, though she has to accept that she won't be getting the reward.

After patient investigation, Stephanie identifies Ranger's thieves as two teenagers who were turned down for jobs at his company, then decided to finance their own company by robbing Ranger's clients, with hidden cameras planted over the clients' security keypads. When Ranger and his men burst into the rival "company"'s office, they find all of the stolen jewelry and valuables stored there; the teenagers were so inept that they used the cash they stole to rent the office space, but had no idea how to fence the stolen property. Ranger does not usually display emotion, but admits to severe embarrassment at being "almost ruined by two goofy kids."

Having solved both her problems, Stephanie decides to resume the "on" stage of her "on-again/off-again" relationship with Joe Morelli.
