= Seven Up (novel) =

2001 novel by Janet Evanovich

- First edition
- Author: Janet Evanovich
- Language: English
- Series: Stephanie Plum
- Genre: Crime novel
- Publisher: St. Martin's Press
- Publication date: 2001
- Publication place: United States
- Media type: Print (Hardcover, Paperback)
- Preceded by: Hot Six
- Followed by: Hard Eight

Seven Up (2001) is the seventh novel by Janet Evanovich in her series featuring bounty hunter Stephanie Plum. The audiobook is narrated by Tanya Eby.

== Plot summary ==
Stephanie's latest quarry is Eddie DeChooch, a septuagenarian semi-retired mobster who was arrested for smuggling cigarettes into New Jersey from Richmond, Virginia. Stephanie finds him in a state of abject depression at his home, but he eludes her and, while searching the house for clues, Stephanie finds a dead body in his shed, an elderly woman named Loretta Ricci, shot multiple times.

Stephanie soon learns that she is not the only one searching for DeChooch; two Mafia types, Benny and Ziggy, are following her around and making themselves at home in her apartment, while her boyfriend, police detective Joe Morelli, wants to question DeChooch about the dead woman in his home. At the same time, Stephanie's friend "Mooner" is worried because his friend and roommate, Dougie Kruper, has disappeared.

At home, Stephanie's dinner with her family is interrupted by the surprise appearance of her older sister, Valerie, with her two young daughters, whose "perfect" life in California came to an abrupt end when her husband abandoned her for their teenage babysitter. Over the next few days, Valerie proposes a number of radical schemes to get her life back under control, ranging from following Stephane's example as a bounty hunter to becoming a lesbian.

Stephanie learns that DeChooch is searching for something, and tries to tempt him into the open by claiming to have whatever "it" is. Connie Rosoli, the office manager for Stephanie's boss, finds out from her Mafia-affiliated family members that DeChooch is looking desperately for a human heart!

When DeChooch was in Richmond, the Mafioso he was collecting the cigarettes from, Louis "Louie D." DiStephano, died of a sudden heart attack. DeChooch telephoned his boss back in Trenton, but misheard his boss's instructions to escort the body back to Trenton for burial ("bring the fart to me") as instructions to bring Louie D's heart back. DeChooch cut out Louie D's heart and brought it back to Trenton, but now he's lost it, and Louie's widow, Sophia, is demanding that he get it back.

DeChooch kidnaps Stephanie's Grandma Mazur and demands the heart in exchange for her. Stephanie manages to rescue her by swapping her for a pig's heart from the butcher shop.

When Mooner also disappears, Stephanie tracks him and Dougie down, with Ranger's help, in the basement of Sophia DiStephano's home in Richmond, where she has been torturing them for the location of the heart. Ranger and Stephanie free Mooner and Dougie, though Sophia manages to escape. Mooner and Dougie confess that DeChooch tasked them to take an ice cooler to Richmond, but they had no idea what was in it, and it turns out that a neighborhood dog ate the heart from the cooler while it was unattended, and Dougie inadvertently delivered an empty cooler to Sophia.

The only thing left is to arrest DeChooch. Stephanie confronts him at his home, and asks him if he killed Loretta Ricci. He says no; Loretta gave herself a fatal heart attack while trying, over-enthusiastically, to rouse him from impotence. He shot her body in frustration, and also to conceal the real cause of death (because it was too embarrassing). Sophia appears, holding both of them at gunpoint, and demanding that Stephanie cut out DeChooch's heart, as "an Eye for an eye". Stephanie manages to subdue Sophia, who is arrested by the police. DeChooch admits that he is too tired to keep running, but insists, for the sake of his pride, that he be brought in by Ranger, not a woman.

The novel ends with Ranger approaching Stephanie in her apartment, reminding her that they have "unfinished business" - specifically, she promised to spend a night with him if he helped her capture DeChooch.

=== FTAs ===
- Eddie DeChooch
- Roseanne Kreiner
- Melvin Baylor

=== Car deaths ===
- Stephanie's Honda CRV
- Mary Mason's Cadillac Seville - hit by a train.
