= Twelve Sharp =

2006 novel by Janet Evanovich

- 2006 Hardcover
- Author: Janet Evanovich
- Language: English
- Series: Stephanie Plum
- Genre: Crime
- Publisher: St. Martin's Press
- Publication date: June 20, 2006
- Publication place: United States
- Media type: Print (Hardcover, Paperback)
- Pages: 320 pp
- ISBN: 0-312-34948-3
- OCLC: 70078334
- Dewey Decimal: 813/.54 22
- LC Class: PS3555.V2126 T93 2006b
- Preceded by: Eleven on Top
- Followed by: Plum Lovin' and Lean Mean Thirteen

Twelve Sharp, published in 2006, is the 12th novel by American author Janet Evanovich featuring the bounty hunter Stephanie Plum. The audiobook is narrated by Lorelei King.

The hardcover version appeared at the top of the New York Times Bestseller List in the week of July 9, 2006, while the paperback release has also been in the top four spots in 2007.

== Plot summary ==
The novel begins with Stephanie being stalked by Carmen Manoso, a woman claiming to be the wife of Ranger, a fellow bounty hunter with whom Stephanie has occasionally been intimate. Ranger is out of town on "bad business" when Stephanie learns that his daughter has been kidnapped. Ranger is the prime suspect.

Ranger comes back to Trenton and hides at Stephanie's apartment. He is trying his best to find his daughter, which isn't made easier by the fact that the police are looking for him. As the story progresses, Stephanie learns that Carmen is actually married to a man named Edward Scrog who is attempting to steal Ranger's identity, even going so far as to kidnap Ranger's daughter Julie. Scrog looks quite a lot like Ranger, that makes the entire thing even more complicated. Scrog wants to be Ranger, because he once saw him arresting an FTA (failure to appear) in the store he worked at and knew that he'd been meant to be Ranger. Ranger asks Steph for help, knowing that she is what the kidnapper wants. He is trying to use Stephanie as bait, tracing her with a GPS-device, so that he can find his daughter.

After Scrog kills Carmen he kidnaps Stephanie to complete his "family" and start a new life. However, he needs money, so Stephanie convinces him to try to find one of her FTAs (wanted for armed robbery) and steal his money. To prevent Stephanie from escaping, Scrog constructs a bomb and tapes it to her. As they try to negotiate for the money, Stephanie's old nemesis Joyce Barnhart turns up to capture the FTA herself. In the struggle that ensues, Scrog gets shot in the foot and Stephanie manages to rip the bomb off before Scrog stun-guns her.

When Stephanie wakes up, her boyfriend Joe Morelli is there. Joyce caught the FTA, as he ran over the bomb after Stephanie tossed it in the road and it exploded. Together Stephanie and Morelli return to the trailer where she and Julie were being kept, but find it empty. Stephanie returns to her apartment, where she finds Scrog. He stun-guns her once more, then ties her to a chair. Even though he originally planned to make his "family" complete with Stephanie, he's seriously considering killing her now. Julie, who is drugged, is in Stephanie's apartment too. Scrog's plan is to kill Ranger when he arrives. Ranger finds them, opens the door with his hands up and Scrog shoots him. Julie attacks Scrog, the drugs having worn off, and shoots him. The police, paramedics and Morelli come in. Ranger, bleeding badly, is rushed to the hospital. On the way there Stephanie finally tells Morelli that she loves him, but leaves out the fact that she loves Ranger, too.

Ranger returns from hospital a while later. One of the bullets penetrated the bulletproof vest, one hit his arm, one his neck; it is still hurting, but he is managing. Stephanie brings him some get-well presents, including cake. She jokingly says that it will be pretty boring with only one Ranger around. Ranger feeds her with some cake and tells her that one Ranger is all she will ever need.

The FTAs throughout the book are Lonnie Johnson, Kevin Gallager, Leon James, Dooby Biagi, Caroline Scarzolli, Melvin Pickle, Charles Chin, Bernard Brown, Mary Lee Truk, and Luis Queen.
