= Plum Spooky =

2009 novel by Janet Evanovich

- First edition cover
- Author: Janet Evanovich
- Audio read by: Lorelei King
- Publisher: St. Martin's Press
- Publication date: January 6, 2009
- ISBN: 978-0-312-38332-9

Plum Spooky (2009) is a novel by Janet Evanovich starring the fictional character Stephanie Plum. It is one of the four holiday novellas in the series (now referred to by the publisher as "Between-the-Numbers Novels") that star the bounty hunter. The audiobook, read by Lorelei King, was released in January 2009.
