= Plum Lucky =

2008 novel by Janet Evanovich

- First edition
- Author: Janet Evanovich
- Language: English
- Series: Stephanie Plum
- Genre: Crime novel
- Publisher: St. Martin's Press
- Publication date: January 8, 2008
- Publication place: United States
- Media type: Print (Hardcover)
- Pages: 176 pp
- ISBN: 978-0-312-37763-2
- OCLC: 156832479
- Dewey Decimal: 813/.54 22
- LC Class: PS3555.V2126 P58 2008b
- Preceded by: Lean Mean Thirteen
- Followed by: Fearless Fourteen

Plum Lucky is a crime novel by mystery writer Janet Evanovich. It is the sixteenth part of her series dedicated to bounty hunter Stephanie Plum. It was published on January 8, 2008.

== Synopsis ==
Diesel and Stephanie end up teaming up with a strange man who thinks he's a leprechaun in an effort to save a horse named Doug and Grandma Mazur.
