= Failure to appear =

Situation of an individual not appearing before a judicial body at a predetermined time

A "failure to appear" (FTA), also known as "bail jumping", occurs when a defendant or respondent does not come before a tribunal as directed in a summons. In the United States, FTAs are punishable by fines, incarceration, or both when committed by a criminal defendant. The severity of the punishment depends on the seriousness of the criminal charges that were the subject of the missed proceeding. An FTA may trigger a bench warrant for the defendant's arrest and impair their eligibility for bail and pretrial release in subsequent proceedings.

== In the United States ==
=== Historically ===
Punishments for FTAs originated out of courts' contempt powers. The Judiciary Act of 1789, the first federal framework governing pretrial detention, did not single out FTAs for punishment but decreed that there should be sanctions for "all contempts of authority". Specific penalties for FTAs emerged on the heels of the federal government's campaign to prosecute Communist leaders under the Smith Act of 1940, which made it a crime to "knowingly or willfully advocate, abet, advise, or teach the duty, necessity, desirability, or propriety of overthrowing or destroying any government in the United States". After the Supreme Court affirmed the convictions of eleven Communist leaders under the Smith Act in Dennis v. United States, four of the defendants fled in July 1951. All four leaders either turned themselves in or were later apprehended, but their flight would inspire Congress to enact punishments for FTAs three years later:

The Federal bail jumping statute was first enacted in 1954 to fill the void in the criminal law highlighted by the conduct of fleeing fugitives who were leaders of the Communist Party. The only available penalties, at that time, were forfeiture of money and contempt proceedings. In the absence of an indictable offense of bail jumping, defendants were able to buy their freedom by forfeiting their bonds and taking the risk that they could go unapprehended. Even if apprehended, many defendants could hide for periods long enough for the government's case, especially for major offenses, to grow weaker because of the unavailability of witnesses, memory lapses, and the like, and thereby defeat the government's prosecutive efforts. They would then be subject only to the criminal contempt charge, the sentence for which was usually of considerably less gravity than for the original offense. These were the reasons that led to the original Federal bail jumping statute of 1954.

As of 1954, few FTA statutes existed at the state level. New York and Minnesota were among the earliest adopters of statutes penalizing FTAs, but these laws were rarely used in practice. By 1966, only seven states had separate sanctions for FTAs. Over thirty states implemented FTA-specific penalties over the next two decades. These laws coincided with a growing national concern about dangerous defendants and the perceived need for greater deterrence in the pretrial system.

The Bail Reform Act of 1966, one of the first significant pieces of the federal bail legislation, made "willfully fail[ing] to appear before any court or judicial officer as required" punishable by up to five years in prison and a $5,000 fine. In 1984, Congress increased the sanctions for FTAs in federal court. In early versions of the bill, lawmakers expressed their resolve to "deter those who would obstruct law enforcement by failing to appear for trial or other judicial appearances and to punish those who indeed fail to appear". Lawmakers saw heightening the penalties for FTAs "as a means of enhancing the effectiveness of the bail jumping offense as a deterrent to flight."

=== Modern federal law ===
Today, a defendant who "fails to appear before a [federal] court as required by the conditions of release" or "fails to surrender for service of sentence pursuant to a court order" remains subject to criminal sanctions. A court will use the following scheme to determine a defendant's punishment:

Offense of preconviction	Punitive measure	Offense level
Offense punishable by death, life imprisonment, or imprisonment up to at least 15 years	prison up to 10 years or fine or both	14
Offense punishable by imprisonment up to at least 5 years	prison up to 5 years or fine or both	11
Any other felony	prison up to 2 years or fine or both	8
Misdemeanor	prison up to 1 year or fine or both	5

A defendant can present an affirmative defense that "uncontrollable circumstances prevented" their appearance. To make this claim successfully, the defendant must not have contributed to the uncontrollable circumstances and must have "appeared or surrendered as soon as such circumstances ceased to exist".

An "uncontrollable circumstance" can either be physical or mental, the latter of which courts refer to as "duress". Not all mental pressures satisfy the uncontrollable circumstance requirement; courts have held that only something as serious as threats of significant bodily harm or death can excuse an FTA. The prospect of prosecutorial reprisal, fear of harassment, and loss of faith in the criminal justice system generally do not amount to uncontrollable duress. Courts have dismissed claims based on fears of deportation and a defendant's desire "to make a political statement or engage in protest activity". The legislative history for the federal statute indicates that the affirmative defense should only apply in extreme circumstances: "for example, a person is recuperating from a heart attack and to leave his bed would imperil his life, or, after he had made careful plans for transportation to the court house, his vehicle breaks down or unexpected weather conditions bring traffic to a halt."

=== State laws ===
All fifty states have implemented statutes penalizing FTAs, which several state statutes call "bail jumping" in their official codes. The District of Columbia and all states besides Mississippi make FTAs the basis of additional criminal charges. For example, an FTA can qualify as a misdemeanor or felony in Idaho depending on the underlying offense:

A person set at liberty by court order, with or without bail, upon condition that he will subsequently appear at a specified time and place, commits a misdemeanor if, without lawful excuse, he fails to appear at that time and place. The offense constitutes a felony where the required appearance was to answer to a charge of felony, or for disposition of any such charge, and the actor took flight or went into hiding to avoid apprehension, trial or punishment. This section does not apply to obligations to appear incident to release under suspended sentence or on probation or parole.

At least thirty states and the District of Columbia authorize courts to issue bench warrants for a defendant's arrest or orders for a defendant to appear after an FTA. Many jurisdictions leave the decision to issue a bench warrant within the judge's discretion—at least under some circumstances. For example, in Maryland, a defendant who "forfeits [...] bail or recognizance and willfully fails to surrender" will have a bench warrant automatically issued for their arrest, whereas a judge retains discretion over whether to use a bench warrant when a defendant fails to appear in response to a citation.

At least forty states impose a driver's license penalty for FTAs, often suspending an individual's license until the person appears in court. These laws generally apply when the FTA occurs in traffic court. In Missouri, a "resident charged with a moving traffic violation" will have their license automatically suspended for failing to appear in court when required. At least seven states authorize driver's license suspensions for reasons unrelated to traffic court. Other license-related punishments include "authorized vehicle immobilization, liens and mandatory delinquency [and] reinstatement fees".

=== Consequences for future proceedings ===
An FTA will often follow a defendant in future proceedings. When deciding whether to release someone pretrial, a judge must usually ask whether a defendant is likely to appear for trial if released and whether the defendant would pose a danger to the community. A defendant's record of prior court attendance is one of the primary factors that a judge looks to when determining whether to grant pretrial release. Having a single FTA can lead courts to refuse to release defendants on their own recognizance or let them post bail. Some courts rely on risk-assessment tools, which use algorithms to predict the likelihood that a defendant will not appear; a prior FTA, especially a recent one, significantly slants the algorithm toward deeming the defendant high-risk.

== Criticism ==
=== Definitional problems ===
Critics argue that policymakers define "failure to appear" too broadly, conflating people who intentionally flee the jurisdiction with those who miss their court dates due to forgetfulness or logistical difficulties. Risk-assessment tools tend to treat all FTAs the same when calculating a defendant's risk score. One scholar has proposed breaking FTAs into three categories: "true flight" (intentionally fleeing the area); local absconding (remaining in the jurisdiction but refusing to come to court even if reminded); and low-cost non-appearance (failing to appear for reasons besides avoiding justice). Critics say these types of FTAs may warrant different interventions.

=== Causes of non-appearance ===
Scholars, activists, and practitioners have criticized federal and state laws for operating on the mistaken assumption that most FTAs reflect a conscious decision to abscond. Critics believe most FTAs are the product of forgetfulness or logistical difficulties—and that, if given another opportunity, a defendant will appear when requested. They note that a single legal proceeding can span several years and consist of multiple court dates; due to backlogs in some courts, defendants may wait all day for their hearings only for a judge to impose a delay. Defendants who must go before a judge regularly can confuse or forget their court dates. Jurisdictions nationwide have reduced FTA rates by reminding people of upcoming court hearings. In New York, an effort to redesign court summons forms and notify people of their court dates using text messages reduced FTAs by 13% and 21%, respectively. These interventions resulted in an estimated 30,000 fewer warrants issued over three years.

Critics note that attending court can be particularly onerous for low-income individuals. Studies have documented a lack of access to transportation and childcare as two factors driving FTAs. Defendants may struggle to make their court dates due to conflicts with their work, as many courts are only open during business hours. Researchers have confirmed a positive correlation between indigence and FTAs across racial and gender demographics. They speculate that the logistical challenges and financial burdens associated with court attendance drove the disparities observed in their results. Advocates have called for transportation assistance and childcare support instead of criminal sanctions to address FTAs. Advocates note that some people, including houseless individuals and people dealing with substance abuse, require additional support and that the threat of criminal sanctions is ineffective.

=== Warrant backlogs ===
Some scholars contend that FTAs have led to warrant backlogs nationwide. In 2019, around one in seven adults had warrants out for their arrest in New Orleans, Louisiana; FTAs were responsible for over half of warrants issued in New Orleans in 2017. A Department of Justice investigation of the police department in Ferguson, Missouri, found that a municipal court had generated thousands of FTA warrants and used them to impose fines and fees on residents. Individuals with warrants out of their arrest may be less likely to seek educational and employment opportunities for fear of getting apprehended. They may have their driver's license revoked and cannot access public benefits. Several jurisdictions have taken steps to clear FTA warrants to reduce these backlogs.

=== Questions about FTA prevalence ===
Whether FTA rates are prevalent enough to warrant criminal sanctions has become a point of contention. FTAs are most common for lower-level, non-violent crimes: primarily in traffic court. Not all individuals who receive a traffic ticket or summons for a minor infraction realize that not attending court can lead to a warrant for their arrest. For serious felonies, FTAs are relatively rare. The most recent data available from the Bureau of Justice Statistics demonstrate that 83% of felony defendants will never miss a court date. The majority of those who miss an appearance will return to court within one year. FTA rates are also challenging to measure and compare. Some jurisdictions treat a single-missed court appearance as an FTA, such that a new FTA arises whenever an individual misses a court date in a single legal proceeding. Other jurisdictions treat all missed court appearances within one legal proceeding as a single FTA.
