= Chelsea Buckland =

Canadian soccer player

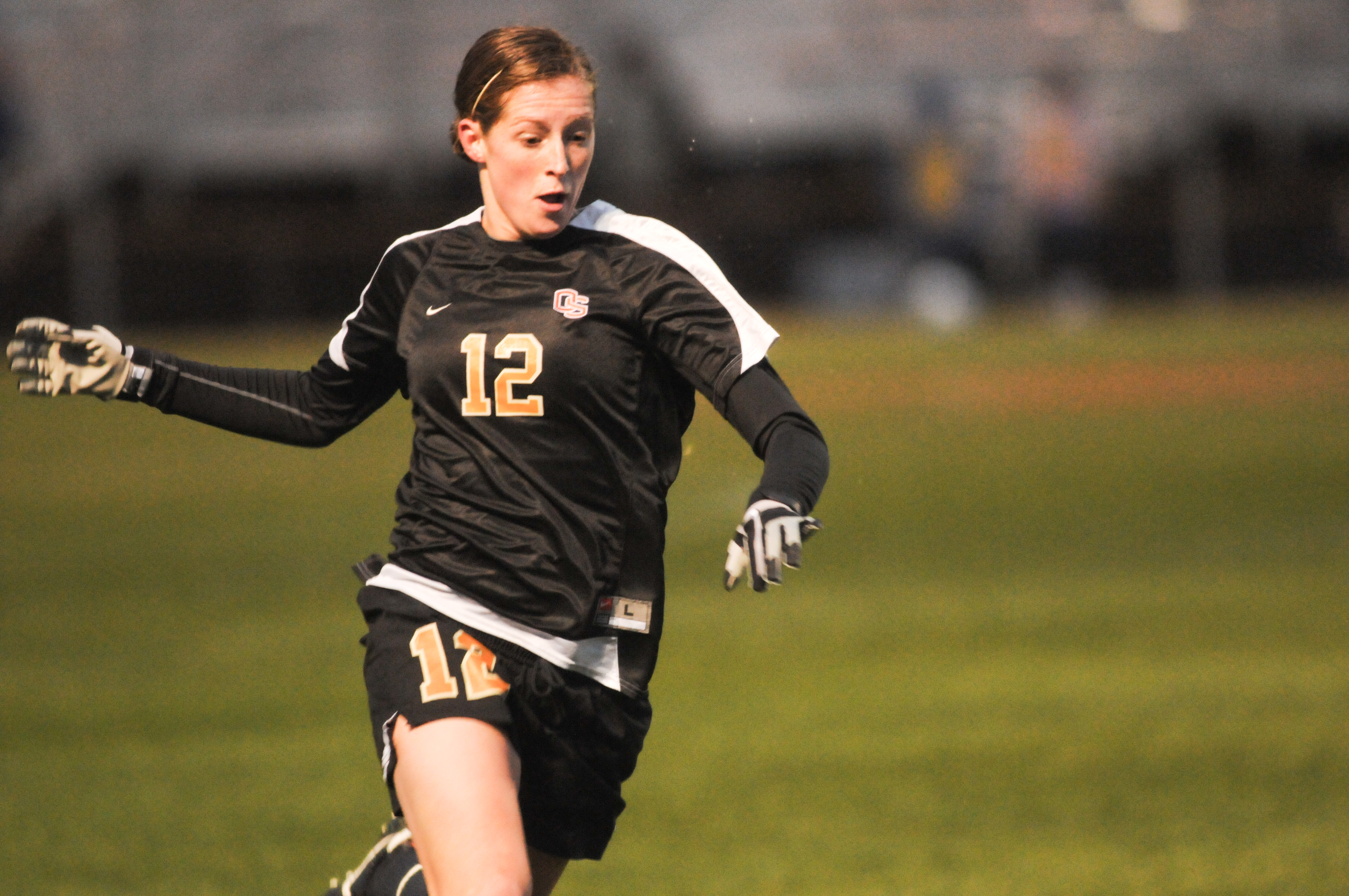

Personal information
- Full name: Chelsea May Buckland
- Date of birth: January 20, 1990 (age 36)
- Place of birth: Surrey, British Columbia, Canada
- Height: 5 ft 6 in (1.68 m)
- Position: Forward

Youth career
- North Shore Storm
- 2005–08: Sands Secondary Scorpions
- 2008: Vancouver Whitecaps

College career
Years	Team	Apps	(Gls)
2008–2013	Oregon State Beavers		

Senior career*
Years	Team	Apps	(Gls)
2009	Vancouver Whitecaps	6	(0)

International career^{‡}
2011–2013	Canada	13	(1)
- * Club domestic league appearances and goals as of January 22, 2012 ‡ National team caps and goals as of August 2, 2013

Chelsea Buckland (born January 20, 1990) is a Canadian former soccer forward who played for the Oregon State Beavers and the Canadian women's national team. Born and raised in Greater Vancouver, British Columbia, she played at the youth and senior women's level for Vancouver Whitecaps FC, before joining the Beavers in the NCAA ranks in 2008. She joined the national team prior to her junior college year and has been with Canada at the 2011 FIFA World Cup (as an alternate) and the 2012 CONCACAF Olympic Qualifying Tournament.

== Early life and youth career ==
Buckland was born in Surrey, British Columbia, and was raised in nearby North Delta. Her father, Glenn, has worked for Canadian Pacific Railway, while her mother, Gail, has worked as a hospital service worker. She also has a younger brother, Reece.

Buckland first began playing organized soccer for a boys team in Whalley, British Columbia. Growing up, she played youth soccer with the North Shore Storm and helped the team to national and provincial championships in numerous years. As a young player, she aspired to play for the Canadian national team and looked up to such players as Christine Sinclair and Karina LeBlanc.

Attending Sands Secondary in North Delta, British Columbia, she led the school's soccer team in scoring for three years, while additionally lettering with the school's basketball and volleyball teams. Prior to her graduation in June 2008, Buckland was featured in the local Province newspaper as one of British Columbia's top high school student-athletes.

== Club career ==
In 2006, Buckland joined the Vancouver Whitecaps FC Prospects Program. Two years later, she was competing with the club's Pacific Coast Soccer League (PCSL) side and scored 11 goals, despite missing a third of the campaign. The Whitecaps advanced to the semifinals of the PCSL Challenge Cup playoffs, where they were defeated 4–2 by the Tri-Cities Xtreme. Aside from league play, Buckland competed in the Keg Spring Cup and the San Diego Surf Cup with the Whitecaps Prospects. At the first tournament, held in Victoria, British Columbia, in March 2008, she scored game-winning goals in the semifinal against the University of British Columbia Thunderbirds and final against the University of Victoria Vikes to help capture the championship. Several months later, in August, she recorded five goals in as many games at the latter tournament, a U19 competition against youth teams from the United States. Helping Vancouver to the semifinals, they lost 3–1 to Northern California state champions Mustang FC.

Buckland advanced to the Whitecaps' to W-League team in 2009, joining them midway through the season. She appeared in 6 of the team's 12 games (starting in one of them) and recorded two assists. Vancouver finished fifth in the Western Conference, failing to qualify for the playoffs.

== Collegiate career ==
Upon graduating from Sands Secondary, Buckland moved on to the college ranks on an athletic scholarship with the Oregon State Beavers of the NCAA's Pacific-10 Conference. Prior to committing to Oregon State in December 2007, Canadian national team player Karina LeBlanc had attempted to recruit her for Rutgers University in New Jersey.

After beginning her college career as a redshirt in 2008, she appeared in all the Beavers' 23 games in 2009, including one start. She scored her first two career collegiate goals in a game against Cal State Northridge, en route to a team-leading 7 goals and 16 points. Her 54 shots (24 on goal) also led the team. At the end of her first college year, she was named to the Pac-10 All-Freshman Team.

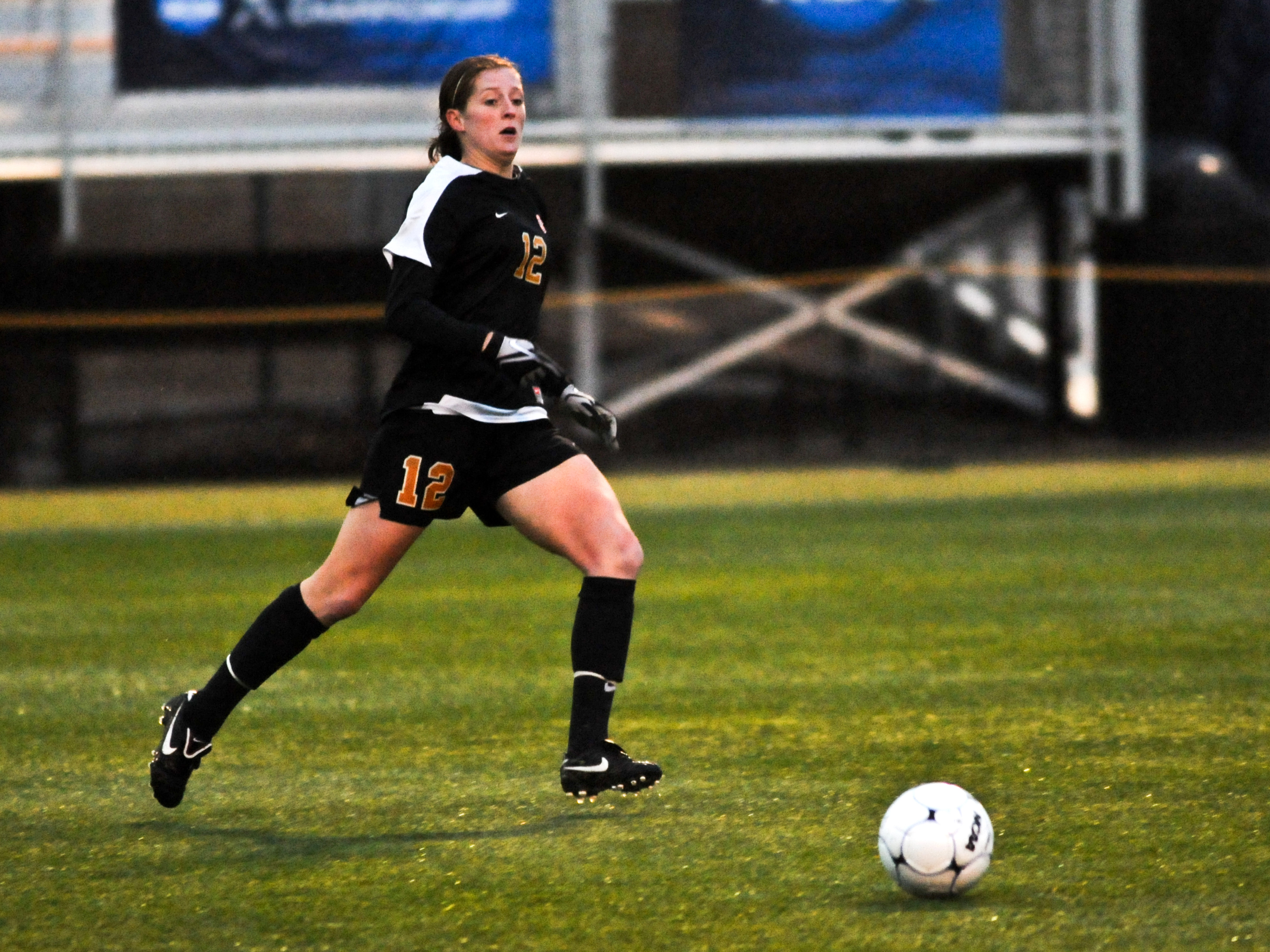
Buckland with Oregon State during a game against Memphis in November 2010

The following year, she improved to 10 goals and 23 points, both team-leading statistics (she tied for the lead in points), while starting in all 20 games. Her efforts helped the Beavers to an NCAA Tournament appearance. Buckland's sophomore year culminated in a selection to the All-Pacific Regional Third Team by the National Soccer Coaches Association of America (NSCAA) and the Pac-10 All-Conference Second Team.

After an injury hampered Buckland's play over the first seven games of her junior season, Buckland was named Offensive MVP at the Oregon State Nike Invitational after scoring four goals in the tournament. she was named Pac-12 Player of the Week on September 27, 2011. Her efforts included her first collegiate hat trick in a 7–0 win against the FIU Golden Panthers. The following month, she earned her second weekly distinction of the year after recording two goals in a pair of Beavers victories between October 17 and 24. Buckland went on to lead her team for a third consecutive year with 11 goals (third among conference players). Playing in the 2011 NCAA Tournament, the Beavers lost in the first round to Portland Pilots 7–6 in a shootout. The NCAA Tournament game was the first hosted by Oregon State (at the women's soccer level) in school history. At the end of the year, Buckland was named to the NSCAA All-Pacific and Pac-12 All-Conference First Teams.

In lieu of her participation with the Canadian national team, which will include the Summer Olympics in London, Buckland placed her academic and athletic career on hiatus in 2012. Prior to Buckland's arrival in Oregon State, the school's soccer program struggled to compete within their conference. Her tenure with the Beavers has helped improve the team in Pac-12 standings, earning them three consecutive berths in the NCAA Tournament for the first time in school history. She has formed an effective duo at the forward position alongside fellow Greater Vancouver native and Whitecaps product Jenna Richardson, who she helped recruit to Oregon State.

== International career ==
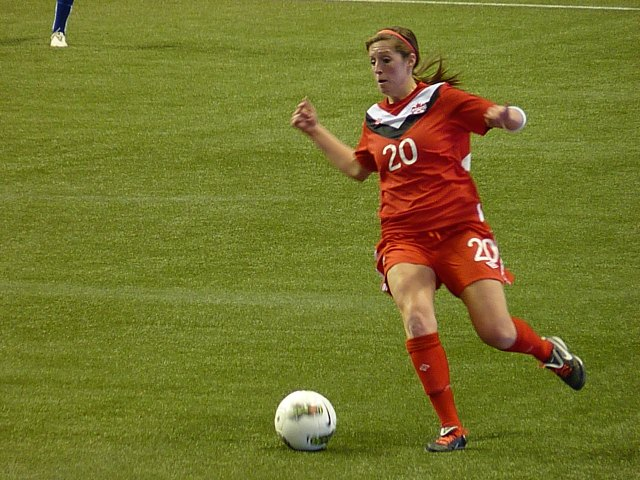
Buckland with the Canadian national team in January 2012 during a game against Haiti

Never having played for any of Canada's national junior teams, Buckland was selected as an alternate to the senior women's 2011 FIFA World Cup squad following her performance in a January 2011 training camp. Prior to the tournament, she was additionally named to Canada's team for the 2011 Cyprus Cup, an annual invitational tournament. Canada went on to win the championship, defeating the Netherlands 2–1 in the final. Buckland did not play in any tournament games, later debut with the national team on May 15, 2011, a 1–1 friendly draw against Switzerland. At the World Cup, held in Germany, Canada failed to advance from the group stage after losing all three of their games; Buckland did not appear in any contests.

Following Buckland's junior year with Oregon State, she joined the Canadian national team's training camp in Sweden. Head coach John Herdman has recalled the camp as a turning point in Buckland's career with the national team and praised her ability to generate plays with other forwards. On November 22, 2011, she recorded her first international goal in a friendly against Sweden. Scored against goalkeeper Hedvig Lindahl, the goal came two minutes after coming off the bench and tied the score at 1–1, before Canada scored again to win the game.

In December 2011, Buckland was named to Canada's team for the 2012 CONCACAF Olympic Qualifiers after competing for a roster spot during another training camp in Fullerton, California. She made her international tournament debut in her hometown Vancouver, British Columbia, coming off the bench in Canada's first game, a 6–0 win against Haiti on January 18, 2012. Buckland then logged her first international start in Canada's second group contest against Cuba. After playing in all three group games, she sat on the bench for the playoffs as Canada succeeded in qualifying for the Olympics by advancing to the final. They lost 4–0 to the United States, winning silver.

Several months later, Buckland dressed for a friendly and was a late sub in a 1–0 win against China PR on May 30. The match was held on home soil in Moncton, New Brunswick. Continuing to train with Canada's national team, Buckland sustained an injury while scrimmaging in Richmond, British Columbia, less than two months ahead of the Olympics. Attempting to make a sharp turn, she tore the anterior cruciate ligament (ACL) and meniscus in her left knee. She underwent surgery and was projected to be sidelined for six to eight months. Though Buckland had not yet been named to the Olympic team (the roster was officially announced two weeks after her injury), she was expected to compete for a spot. Herdman continued to voice his support for Buckland, heralding her as a "strong contender for working alongside Sinclair in the future."

== Awards ==
Award	Year
Keg Spring Cup (with the Vancouver Whitecaps FC Prospects)	2008
Pac-10 All-Freshman	2009
Pac-10 All-Conference Second Team	2010
Pac-12 All-Conference First Team	2011
NSCAA All-Pacific Regional Third Team	2010
NSCAA All-Pacific Regional First Team	2011
Pac-12 Player of the Week	September 19–26, 2011; October 17–24, 2011
