= North Delta Secondary School =

North Delta Secondary
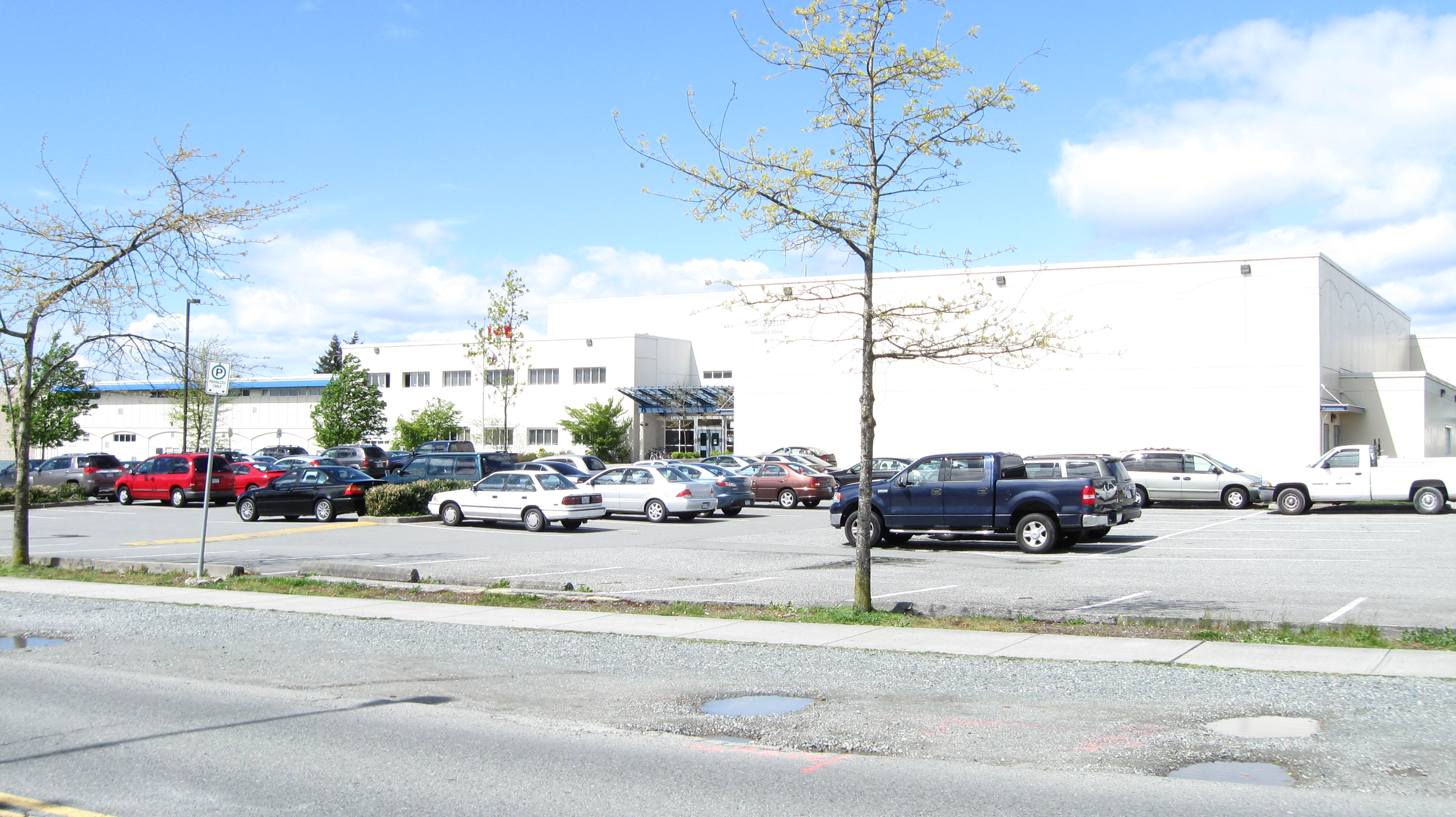

Location
- 11447 82 Avenue; Delta, British Columbia, V4C 5J6; Canada; 49.15327°N 122.90536°W

Information
- School type: Public, high school
- Motto: High is our Honour, Proud is our Name
- Founded: 1957
- School number: 3737012
- Principal: S. Sahota
- Staff: 81
- Grades: 8-12
- Enrollment: 1200 (September 16, 2008)
- Area: North Delta
- Colour: Black/Gold/White
- Mascot: Husky
- Team name: ND Huskies
- Website: nd.deltasd.bc.ca
- Last updated: September 16, 2006

North Delta Secondary is a public high school in Delta, British Columbia, Canada. It is part of School District 37 Delta.

North Delta Secondary School, when it was opened in 1957, was originally a secondary school designed to accommodate approximately 550 students. At that time it was the second secondary school in Delta and eliminated the need for students in the north of Delta to commute south to Delta Senior Secondary in Ladner. It housed grade 8 to grade 12 students and continued to be a five-grade secondary school until 1975. In the early 1970s, due to new construction and population increases in the community, Burnsview Junior Secondary and Sands Junior Secondary joined Delview Junior Secondary as the three feeder schools to North Delta. Until the opening of Seaquam Secondary School in the Sunshine Hills area in 1977, all senior secondary students in the North Delta area were graduates of North Delta Secondary School.

In October 2003, after two years of major construction and renovation, NDSS had a ribbon-cutting ceremony that officially opened the new North Delta Secondary School. North Delta Secondary School is now capable of carrying an enrollment of 1350 students.

The 2004-2005 school year marked the last year of North Delta Senior Secondary. Starting with the 2005-2006 school year, the school became known as North Delta Secondary, with the addition of grade 10s. This was followed with the subsequent addition of grade 8 and 9s in the following year.

== Notable alumni ==
- Mitch Berger - professional football punter in the National Football League (NFL)
- Ian Boothby - comedian, podcaster, writer for The Simpsons comics, cartoonist for The New Yorker, writer/creator of the Sparks! book series
- Troy Brouwer - professional hockey player, winner of the 2010 Stanley Cup Finals
- Tyler Connolly - lead singer, Theory of a Dead Man
- Chris Crippin - drummer for the Juno Award-winning band, Hedley
- Charlotte Diamond - Juno Award-winning children's singer
- Jeff Francis - professional baseball player in Major League Baseball (MLB)
- Kyle O'Reilly - two-time Ring Of Honor wrestling tag team champion and ECCW Pacific Cup winner
- Gordie Pladson - professional baseball player for the Houston Astros of MLB
- Davis Sanchez - professional football player in the NFL and Canadian Football League
- Paul Steele - rower who was a member of the Canadian men's eights team that won the gold medal at the 1984 Summer Olympics
