= Holly Elementary School =

Holly Elementary School can mean:

- Holly Elementary School (Delta, British Columbia)
- Holly Elementary School (Surrey, British Columbia)
