= We All Fall Down (2000 film) =

- Directed by: Martin Cummins
- Written by: Richard C. Burton; Martin Cummins
- Starring: Darcy Belsher; Martin Cummins; Helen Shaver; Françoise Robertson; Nicholas Campbell; René Auberjonois; Ryan Reynolds
- Release date: 2000
- Running time: 92 minutes
- Country: Canada
- Language: English

We All Fall Down is a 2000 Canadian drama film directed by Martin Cummins.

The film stars Darcy Belsher as Michael, a young man whose life enters a downward spiral after the death of his mother. The film's cast also includes Helen Shaver, Françoise Robertson, Nicholas Campbell, René Auberjonois, Barry Pepper, Mike Dopud and Ryan Reynolds.

Shaver won the Genie Award for Best Supporting Actress at the 21st Genie Awards.

== Cast ==
- Darcy Belsher as Michael
  - Silas Wind Radies as Young Michael
- Martin Cummins as Kris
- Francoise Robertson as Ryan
- Helen Shaver as Sherry
- Nicholas Campbell as Bruce
- Rene Auberjonois as Tim
- Barry Pepper as John
- Ryan Reynolds as "Red Shoes"
- Richard C. Burton as Tom Sellek (credited as Richard Burton)
- Raquel Meade as Emmett
- Brandy Ledford as Ultimate Woman
- Barbara Lemarre as Kendra
- Ocean Hellman as Michael's Mother
- Glen Marcoux as Tracey
- Danny Mack as Himself
- Dan Tapanila as Himself
- Barry Hendricks as Rod
- Joey Seiffert as Carol
- Mel Tuck as Himself
- Karen Elizabeth Austin as Michael's Aunt (credited as Karen Austin-Tuck)
- Mike Dopud as Tracey's Cousin
