= Pier 66 (film) =

- Written by: Kimberley Costello
- Directed by: Michael Lange
- Country of origin: United States
- Original language: English

Production
- Producer: Bruce Shurley
- Editor: Michael F Anderson
- Production company: Aaron Spelling Productions

Original release
- Release: May 25, 1996

Pier 66 is a 1996 American TV film. It was shot as a pilot for a TV series that did not eventuate but screened as a stand-alone TV movie.

It was known as "Melrose Place in a marina".

== Plot ==
The lives and loves of young people who live in a marina.

== Cast ==
- Michael Weatherly as Decker Monroe
- Jeri Lynn Ryan as Beth Madison
- Meredith Salenger as Kate Kelly
- Martin Cummins as Nick Monroe
- Brandy Ledford as Alex Davies
- Timothy Patrick Quill as Jack Tyler
- Denise Richards as Carlin Mills
- Fernando Lopez as J.D. Ramos

== Production ==
The series was inspired by the success of Melrose Place. Aaron Spelling wanted to do a similar show in a tropical setting, "Melrose in a marina". In November 1994 a brainstorming session was held involving Kimberley Costello who had worked on Melrose. Costello says she wanted to go to a place that wasn't instantly familiar to the TV audience. "All of a sudden, I blurted out Fort Lauderdale," she says. "I was thinking `young, East Coast' and a place where we haven't been. It was as if all the bells and whistles had gone off."

Spelling's partner E. Duke Vincent knew the area from scouting missions for a proposed Blockbuster Park (Spelling Entertainment was a subsidiary of Blockbuster). Spelling sold the show to ABC.

Filming took place in Fort Lauderdale in March–April 1995. It was originally called Fort Lauderdale before being renamed Pier 66.

"This will probably be the final thing we need to dispel the area's reputation as a tacky spring break place," said Elizabeth Wentworth, head of the film office at the Broward Economic Development Council. "It will show us as a beautiful, upscale area, the yachting capital of the world."

"There will be no drug deals or killings on the dock," said Costello. "If anything like that happens, it will be away from our regular locations. That isn't what this show is about and it would undermine what we want the place to represent, a glamorous location where people would want to come."

ABC did not pick up the series. "We're going to sell that show," said producer Aaron Spelling. "It's going to be on someplace if I have to take it to cable. I loved the look of Fort Lauderdale and I loved the way the pilot screened.... I was very surprised - shocked - that ABC didn't pick us up. I think they were scared to death of having another serial." No series resulted. But the pilot was aired as a stand-alone movie in 1996.

"The show might be more sizzle than substance, the equivalent of a deliciously trashy beach novel, but at least it's not a rerun," said one review.
