= Seaquam Secondary School =

Seaquam Secondary
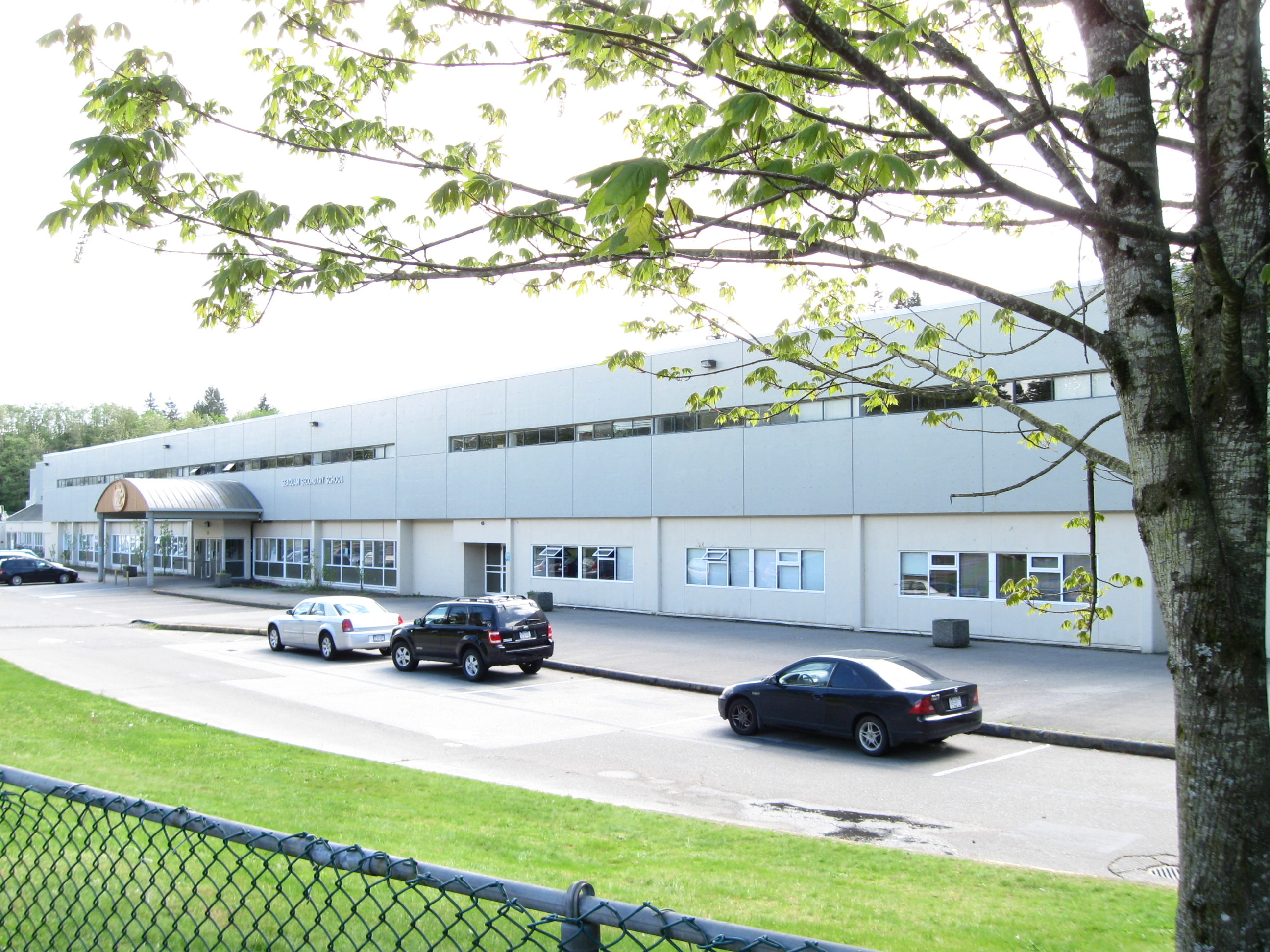
- Seaquam Secondary (Front)

Location
- 11584 Lyon Road; British Columbia (BC), V4E 2K4; Canada; 49.12664°N 122.9023°W

Information
- School type: Public, high school
- Founded: 1977
- School board: School District 37 Delta
- School number: 3737040
- Principal: Ken Headley, Mike Annandale, Rebeca Rubio
- Staff: 77
- Grades: 8-12
- Enrollment: 1324 (30 September 2007)
- Language: English
- Area: North Delta
- Colours: Royal blue, black & yellow
- Mascot: Seahawks
- Team name: Seaquam Seahawks
- Feeder schools: Cougar Canyon Elementary; Heath Elementary; Pinewood Elementary; Sunshine Hills Elementary
- Website: se.deltasd.bc.ca
- Last updated: September 9th, 2025

Seaquam Secondary /siːˈækwəm/ is a public high school serving the affluent Sunshine Hills and Sunshine Woods neighbourhoods in Delta, British Columbia. Seaquam opened in 1977. The Fraser Institute listed Seaquam Secondary as the highest ranked public school in British Columbia in 2018, coming in 20th overall with independent schools taking the first 19 spots.

The school name was decided by a contest in which students and members of the community participated. The Board of School Trustees chose "Seaquam" in the end, which means or 'sunshine' in the Musqueam language.

The school opened on September 6, 1977, with 37 staff members and 633 students in grades 7 to 11. The number of staff was increased to 41 when one hundred more students enrolled than expected. Since then, grade 12 was added and grade 7 was dropped to meet the present 8-12 standard for high schools. A few of the original teaching staff still remain teaching in Seaquam.

== Programs ==
Since 2011 Seaquam has been an IB (International Baccalaureate) World School.

On five occasions, the Seaquam Performing Arts Program has placed in the top six at the BC Festival of the Arts. Many Seaquam alumni have become well known professional performers.

The Seaquam Secondary Athletics program has won four BC provincial Championships, with the first coming in 2004 by the Junior Girls Volleyball team. The Football program subsequently won BC Provincial Championships three years in a row from 2006 to 2008. The Varsity Football Team won the BC AA High School Championship in 2006 and in 2016. This was followed by a BC AA Junior Varsity Championship in 2007 and a Grade 8 Tier II Championship in 2008. In 2011 The Senior Girls Volleyball team captured the school's first ever Senior Girls BCSS Championship by winning the AAA Girls Volleyball Provincials in Parksvile.

== Notable alumni ==
- Vinessa Antoine, actress
- Kristian Ayre, actor
- Adam Braidwood, former CFL player
- Martin Cummins, actor
- Cameron Melnyk, State Shock singer
- Deanna Milligan, actress
- Jalen Philpot, CFL football player
- Tyson Philpot, CFL football player
- Dave Randorf, TSN sports analyst
- Davis Sanchez, football player
- Jason Gray-Stanford, actor

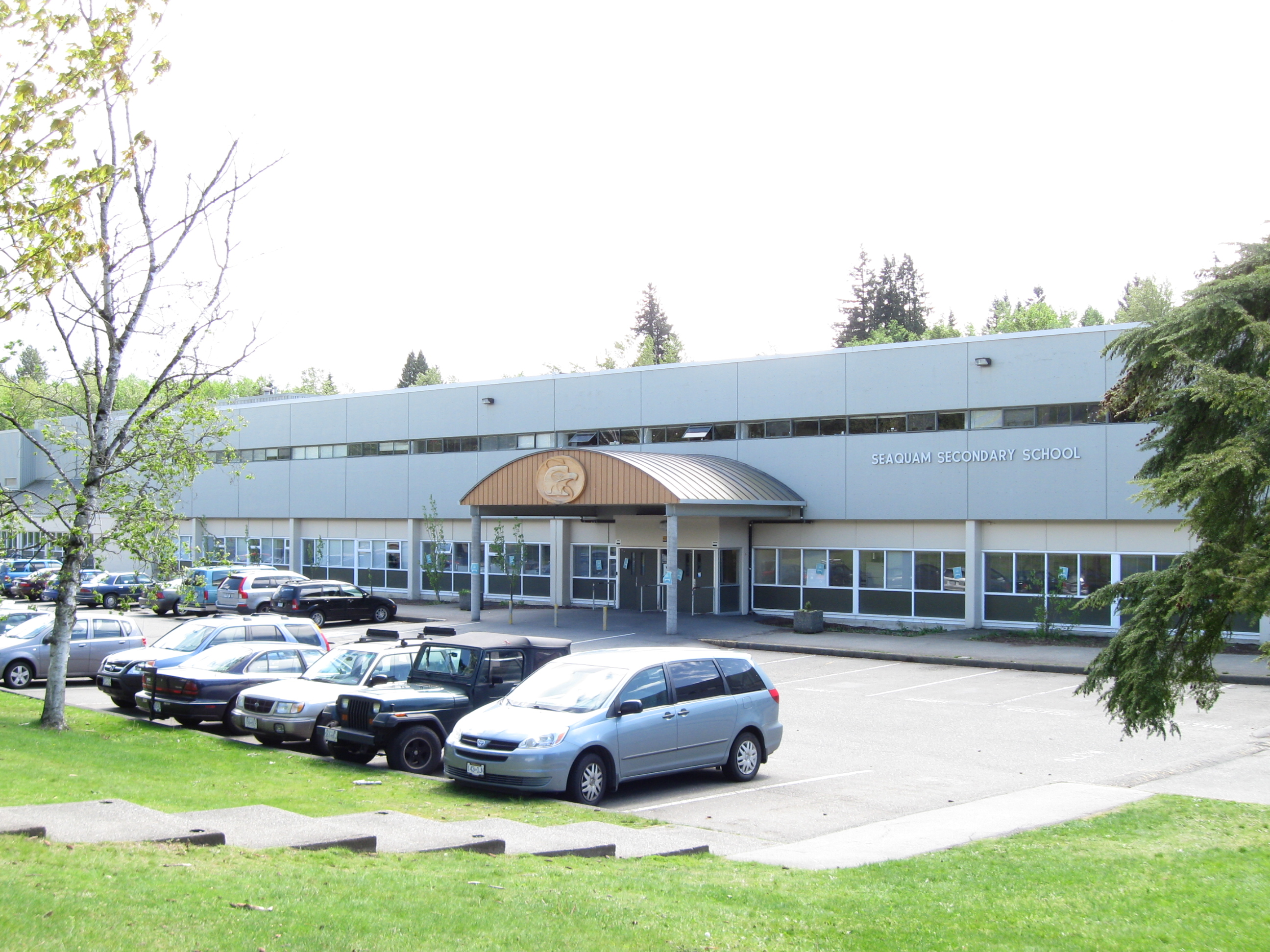
Frontal view of Seaquam Secondary

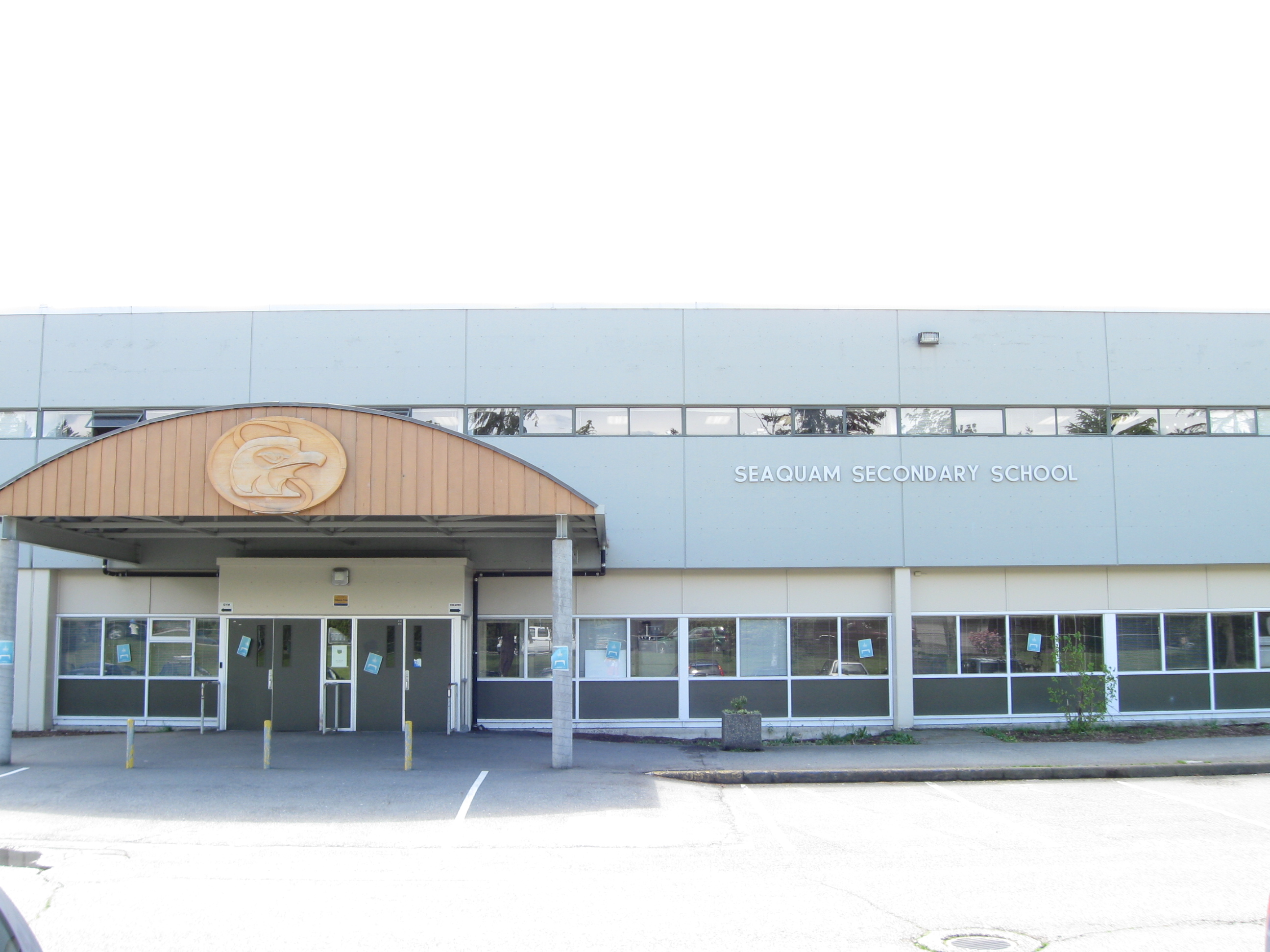
Main entrance to Seaquam Secondary
