= Zebra Lounge =

- DVD cover
- Written by: Claire Montgomery; Monte Montgomery
- Directed by: Kari Skogland
- Starring: Kristy Swanson; Stephen Baldwin; Brandy Ledford; Cameron Daddo
- Music by: John McCarthy
- Country of origin: Canada
- Original language: English

Production
- Producer: Paco Alvarez
- Cinematography: Barry Parrell
- Editor: George Roulston
- Running time: 93 minutes

Original release
- Release: October 4, 2001

Zebra Lounge is a 2001 erotic thriller directed by Kari Skogland and starring Kristy Swanson, Stephen Baldwin, Brandy Ledford, and Cameron Daddo. It was written by Claire Montgomery and Monte Montgomery.

== Plot ==
Alan and Wendy Barnet are stuck in a marital rut and decide to answer an ad they find in a Swinging magazine. The couple meets with Jack and Louise Bauer at the Zebra Lounge. The Bauers are a pair of experienced swingers who help the Barnets fulfill their sexual fantasies. However, Alan and Wendy soon realize that the Bauers are not who they seem to be.

== Reception ==
Reviewer Ryan Cracknell called Zebra Lounge "a trite, albeit steamy, waste of time." The film has a 2.9 star rating on Rotten Tomatoes.

== Cast ==
- Kristy Swanson - Louise Bauer
- Stephen Baldwin - Jack Bauer
- Brandy Ledford - Wendy Barnet
- Cameron Daddo - Alan Barnet
- Dara Perlmutter - Brooke Barnet
- Daniel Magder - Daniel Barnet
- Vincent Corazza - Neil Bradley
- Brian Paul - Adam Frazier
- Howard Hoover - Bill Wallace
- J.D. Nicholsen - Detective
- Brandan Turcic - Evan
- Chris Gillett - Hank
- Judy White - Janet
- Stephen Fretwell - Paul McGrew
- Joan Gregson - Grandma Margaret
- Stephanie Moore - Marissa Wallace
- Larissa Gomes - Marnie
- Shani Scherenzel - Tina

== Home media ==
The film was released on DVD and VHS in January 2002.
