= Twists of Terror =

- American/UK VHS cover of "Twists of Terror"
- Genre: Horror, Thriller
- Written by: John Shirley
- Directed by: Douglas Jackson
- Starring: Jennifer Rubin; Françoise Robertson; Nick Mancuso; Joseph Ziegler
- Theme music composer: Alan Reeves
- Country of origin: Canada
- Original language: English

Production
- Executive producers: Neil Meron; Craig Zadan
- Producer: Nicolas Clermont
- Editor: Glenn Berman
- Running time: 90 minutes
- Budget: $4.7 million

Original release
- Network: The Movie Network
- Release: July 2, 1997

Twists of Terror, originally titled Primal Scream, is a 1997 Canadian made-for-television horror anthology film directed by Douglas Jackson and starring Jennifer Rubin, Françoise Robertson, Nick Mancuso and Joseph Ziegler.

== Plot ==
A collection of three macabre tales, presented by an agoraphobic middle-aged man, named Philip, who lives in a seedy section of Los Angeles. As he sorts through his piles of yellowed newspaper clippings, he relates his paranoid nightmares through three stories.

"The People You Meet" is based on a couple, Joe and Amy, who are on their second honeymoon, when they are forced off the road by a speeding sportscar. They get a lift from an odd local who is not what he seems. They pick up another hiker, who just happens to be a friend of the local, and they kidnap Joe and Amy and take them to an abandoned cabin. It concludes with the man and woman both turning on one another, as they had set each other up.

"The Clinic" finds a workaholic traveling salesman, Crenshaw, who after stopping for gas late one night in a nowhere town is attacked by a vicious dog. He finds sanctuary in a private clinic where he is treated by the young Dr. Roberts and a beautiful nurse. Very strange things seem to be happening in this clinic. Blood on the walls, bone chilling screams, patients dancing in the hall. Crenshaw is told that the hallucinations are caused by a rare form of rabies. However, it turns out that inmates have taken over the clinic, which is an asylum.

"Stolen Moments" shows a shy and pretty Cindy Craig who has trouble meeting men, living her life in an apartment with a plethora of pets. One evening she goes to a bar and is picked up by two men, they go back to an abandoned house and have sex, but then she murders them and resumes her life as the 'quiet' woman she is.

== Cast ==
- Jennifer Rubin as Amy
- Françoise Robertson as Cindy
- Nick Mancuso as Daniel
- Joseph Ziegler as The Host
- Christopher Heyerdahl as Darien
- Carl Marotte as Joe
- Martin Neufeld as Dr. Roberts
- Jayne Heitmeyer as Tanya
- Andrew Jackson as Barry
- Jack Langedijk as Richard
- Keath Thome as Bernard
- Claudia Besso as Mai
- Steve Adams as Sam

== Production ==
The film was based on a screenplay by horror and sci-fi novelist John Shirley, known for his work on The Crow. It was produced by Canadian studio Filmline International (in conjunction with Canada's The Movie Network), with U.S. studio Paramount Pictures acquiring distribution rights. In a 2000 interview, Shirley said that he didn't conceive the title Twists of Terror, which he thought was a poor name, but added that the film itself "came out pretty good in a low budget way". The film had the working title of Primal Scream when it was being shot, and according to Playback magazine, was budgeted at $4.7 million.

Filming occurred in Montreal, Quebec and Léry, Quebec. The cast consisted of local actors from Quebec and other parts of Canada, aside from the first segment, which features American actress Jennifer Rubin, who had notably appeared in the horror film A Nightmare on Elm Street 3: Dream Warriors ten years prior.

Martin Neufeld, who appears in the second segment "The Clinic", later recalled that he was nervous to be working with veteran actor Nick Mancuso, saying on his website, "I had always been a fan of Nick Mancuso since his Stingray days, a show that I enjoyed immensely and watched regularly. So when I found out that I would be working with Nick I was very excited. Because 'The Clinic' was pretty much going to be a three hander between Nick, Jayne Heitmeyer and myself. But for some reason, I was extremely nervous on the first day of shooting. I only had a small scene that day with Nick, and yet I kept missing my mark. I wasn't getting into my light, I was struggling to remember my dialogue, I was sweating bullets, it was horrible. I felt terrible. And of course the worse I felt the more self conscious I became. And that is death for any actor. Thankfully Nick was really cool about the whole thing. We finally got the scene in the can and then I was fine. The rest of the shoot went extremely well."

== Release ==
Twists of Terror premiered on The Movie Network in its native Canada on July 2, 1997. Later in 1997, the film was released on video in Germany and Australia (where it received an 18+ rating for an explicit sex scene in the third segment), and then in the UK and Japan in April 1998. In Spain, it was released on VHS under the title Terror en la Penumbra, which translates to Terror in the Darkness. This release featured a Spanish dub. In Argentina, it was released as Lazos De Terror (meaning Ties to Terror), although this release was subtitled, rather than featuring the same dub as the Spanish VHS.

The film made its U.S. television premiere on October 17, 1998, airing on the Paramount-affiliated Showtime. It would continue to be aired heavily during the early 2000s, on both The Movie Network and Showtime.

In the U.S., it was released on VHS by Paramount Home Entertainment during April 1999, The Canadian VHS was released in 2000, with a DVD later being released in the country on November 26, 2003. It was released on LaserDisc in Hong Kong by CIC Video (a joint venture created by Paramount and Universal to distribute their films outside North America). The non-North American VHS releases had also been handled by CIC Video.

The film has never been made officially available on any digital platforms.

== Reception ==
Twists of Terror is included in the 2000 book Creature Features: The Science Fiction, Fantasy, and Horror Movie Guide, with author John Stanley writing "This loosely knit trilogy of horror stories, lifting its narrative styles from Tales from the Crypt and Amazing Stories, captures a surreal quality usually missing from this type of anthology. Scriptwriter John Shirley sets his stories in a dark world where innocence and guilt are turned topsy-turvy, where sex and retribution are the standards of the night. The only connecting link is a storyteller called simply "The Host," but he's an odd duck, having none of the cackling charm of the Cryptkeeper. No, this creepy yarnmeister is in dire need of a shave, haircut, and bath as he wanders through the upper story of a run-down mansion surrounded by old newspapers with screaming headlines that recount the tales he spins."

Allmovie gave the film two out of five stars and claim it "offers up three spooky stories." Reelfilm gave the film two and a half out of four stars in October 2001, and wrote "What really kills Twists of Terror is the painfully dull second story, which just seems to go on and on for far too long. And by the time the twist comes, it's really hard to care. The third tale isn't bad, but after that second one, all of my interest had vanished and was replaced by growing irritation. Mancuso was good, though, as was Rubin (she was also in the dreadful Little Witches - it's really a shame that she's getting typecast as a horror chick)."

Canuxploitation.com wrote an unfavorable review, stating "As with much of his work, Jackson manages to put a nice professional sheen on Twists of Terror, but like so many Canadian direct-to-video timewasters, the film falls victim to its lack of resources--from an underdeveloped script to unconvincing actors and a wretched synthesizer score. The films trio of terrible tales may not be as flagrantly stupid as those in Freakshow, but they also fail to live up to the promise of The Uncanny, which managed to integrate an interesting wraparound vignette with its well-thought-out (if not always successful) stories. Too uninteresting and sanitized to recommend to the horror fans that might be interested in it, Twists of Terror is a triple disappointment."

Apollo Guide gave a rating of 31/100. Emanuel Levy awarded the film three out of five stars. The book DVD & Video Guide 2005 (Ballantine Books) gave the film two and a half out of five stars.
