= Provincial Outreach Program for Autism and Related Disorders =

Public school in Delta, British Columbia, Canada

Location
- 4746 57 Street; Delta, British Columbia, V4K 3C9; Canada; 49°5′16″N 123°3′53″W

Information
- Funding type: Public
- School board: School District 37 Delta
- School number: 3795008
- Principal: Leslie Mackay
- Website: www.autismoutreach.ca
- Last updated: March 29, 2006

The Provincial Outreach Program for Autism and Related Disorders (POPARD) (formerly Provincial Resource Program for Autism and Related Disorders) is a specialized program within Canada's School District 37 Delta. The program is funded by the Ministry of Education to serve the needs of school age students with profound developmental disorders or disabilities that limit their ability to participate in a regular school environment.
