= Françoise Robertson =

Canadian actress

- Born: London, England
- Occupation: actress

Françoise Robertson is a Canadian actress, known to US audiences for her portrayal of D'orothea Wilson in the TV miniseries More Tales of the City (1998) and its follow-up Further Tales of the City (2001). These miniseries were sequels to Tales of the City (1994), which starred Cynda Williams in the role of D'orothea.

She appeared as the main character of the third story in the 1997 TV movie Twists of Terror.

She was born in London, England.

Her career has spanned two decades, with appearances in Sliders, Stargate SG-1, The Minion, V, and Supergirl, and the films We All Fall Down and Jesus of Montreal.
