= The Minion =

- Promotional release poster
- Directed by: Jean-Marc Piché
- Written by: Matt Roe
- Produced by: Claudio Castravelli
- Starring: Dolph Lundgren; Françoise Robertson
- Cinematography: Barry Parrell
- Edited by: Yvann Thibaudeau
- Music by: Jean Corriveau; Eric Wurst; David Wurst
- Production companies: Taurus 7 Film Corporation; Mahagonny Pictures
- Distributed by: The Kushner-Locke Company
- Release date: September 26, 1998
- Running time: 95 minutes
- Countries: Canada; United States
- Language: English
- Budget: $6 million

The Minion is a 1998 action supernatural horror film directed by Jean-Marc Piché and starring Dolph Lundgren and Françoise Robertson. It was released to television and video in various countries.

== Plot ==
The film's plot revolves around the coming of the Apocalypse, heralded by the imminent liberation of the Antichrist from the depths of Hell through a certain gateway at the close of one full millennium. This gate can only be opened by a special key, which has been kept guarded by the order of the Templars (who in this version existed since the last days of Jesus). The key in turn is sought out by the servant of the Antichrist, simply known as the Minion, a demonic spirit that transfers itself into the next available host body when his previous one is killed off. His first attempt to gain the key at the close of the year 999 is foiled; the sole surviving Templar of the company charged with hiding the key eventually takes off with a ship to the west, to what was at that time known as the "end of the world", to keep it from the Minion's grasp.

A thousand years later, near Christmas of 1999, two city engineer workers accidentally find a hidden Templar burial chamber beneath New York City. A Mohawk archeologist, Karen Goodleaf, is tasked with the examining the chamber and its contents, when the Minion attacks. Before he can claim the key, however, he is stopped by a man wearing a priest's outfit who kills the Minion's host body with a blow from a spiked gauntlet to the neck and then takes the key for himself. Confused, Karen chases after the man, who eventually introduces himself as Lukas Sadorov, a Templar and former Speznas who deserted the Soviet army after witnessing a massacre of civilians in Afghanistan and was sent by the head of his order to recover the key. Karen insistently tags along with Lukas and eventually gains his trust. After having seen the Minion in action, she proposes they hide the key in a nuclear waste depository built on the grounds of her childhood reservation home, whose lingering radioactivity would theoretically prevent the Minion's host bodies from claiming it. She enlists the help of her grandfather, Michael Bear, a Mohawk shaman who works as a foreman at the depository plant, in order to gain access to the facility.

However, the Minion repeatedly takes over people who unwittingly come into contact with his previous host bodies, enabling him to continue his relentless pursuit. He finally takes over Karen's former archeology tutor Professor Schulman, who is assisting the NYPD in the investigation of the apparent serial murder case, and tricks the police into opening a manhunt on Lukas. After killing Karen's grandfather and donning his radiation suit as a disguise, he tricks Lukas into giving him the key and escapes with it to Jerusalem, the location of the Templar's sanctuary and the gate to Hell hidden within its crypts.

The Minion arrives at the Templars' headquarters just before Lukas and Karen do, taking the Templars by surprise and killing most of them. Bernard, one of the Templar Knights, manages to kill the Minion's host, but in his eagerness to prove himself better than Lukas, he accidentally allows the Minion to take possession of him and thus insert the key into the gate. Lukas and Karen arrive shortly after, and while Karen tries to remove the key from the lock, Lukas battles the possessed Bernard and kills him. Together, he and Karen, although tempted by the Antichrist himself, manage to prevent the gate's unlocking just before the final seal on the door is burst. With the Templars decimated, Lukas decides to rebuild the order, and Karen decides to join him, marking the dawn of a new generation of Templars to guard the gate and the key.

== Cast ==
- Dolph Lundgren as Lukas Sadorov
- Françoise Robertson as Karen Goodleaf
- Roc LaFortune as David Schulman
- Allen Altman as Dante
- Andy Bradshaw as Photographer
- Michael Greyeyes as Gray Eagle
- David Nerman as Lieutenant Roseberry
- Jean-Marc Bisson as Bernard
- Anik Matern as Police Lieutenant
- Tony Calabretta as Dispatcher
- Don Francks as Michael Baer
- Tedd Dillon as Stranger
- Matt Holland as Parking Lot Cop
- Dennis St John as Gregor
- Michel Perron as Giannelli

== Reception ==
=== Critical response ===
Robert Pardi of TV Guide stated in his positive review that "Despite its bible-bending flights of fancy, this nail-biter builds interest in its supernatural fiend. The story itself isn't much, but the film's personnel have studied the scripture of how to craft rock 'em, sock 'em action sequences."

TheActionElite.com gave it 2 out of 5 and criticized "Its boring pace and lack of action make it a chore to get through so go watch End of Days again instead."

Michael Haag in his book Templars: History and Myth: From Solomon's Temple to the Freemasons (2009) said, "The budget for this film was $12 million. A pity they did not spend a cent on research (citing that one reference was 600 years out).
