= Immaculate Conception Delta =

Immaculate Conception School

Location
- 8840 88th Avenue & 119th Street; Delta, British Columbia, V4C 6M4; Canada; 49.1643°N 122.8934°W

Information
- School type: Private elementary school
- Founded: 1959
- Principal: Mr. Maurice Jacob
- Grades: K-7
- Enrollment: 1334 (16 January 2006)
- Language: English
- Area: North Delta
- Colours: Navy, white
- Team name: IC Storm
- Website: www.icdelta.com
- Last updated: 3 January 2013

Immaculate Conception Delta is a private elementary school located in North Delta, British Columbia, Canada. It was founded by the Ursuline Sisters in 1959 and it belongs to the Catholic Independent Schools of the Vancouver Archdiocese. The kindergarten-7 school offers a well-rounded academic program for the children of the Immaculate Conception Parish community. This school was one of many chosen to host the "Man of the Shroud" exhibit in 2013.
