= North Delta =

North Delta Annieville
- Neighbourhood of Delta
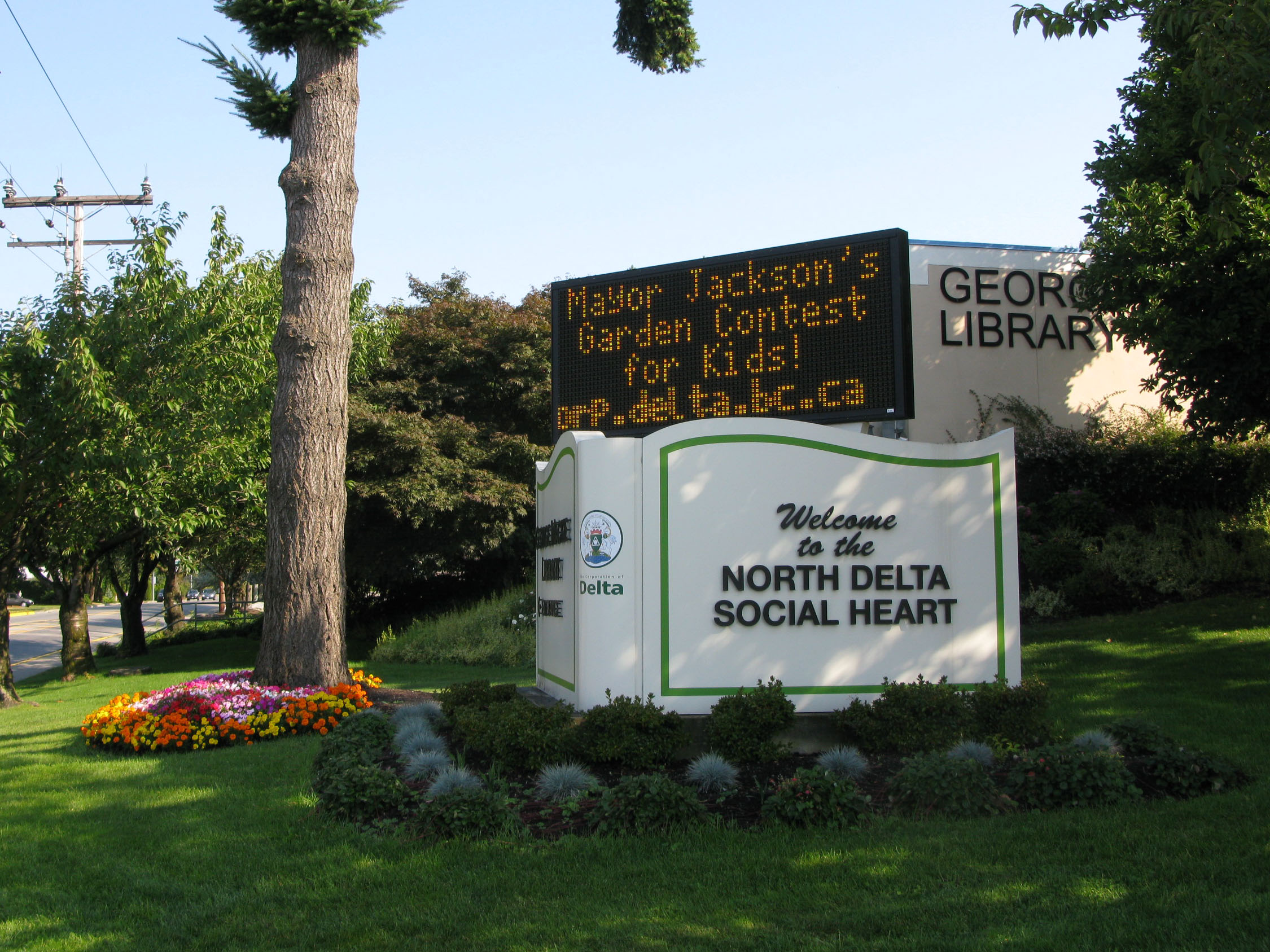
- North Delta's "Social Heart" area includes the George Mackie Library opposite Nordel Shopping Centre

- Location of North Delta within Metro Vancouver
- Coordinates: 49°09′16″N 122°54′00″W
- Country: Canada
- Province: British Columbia
- Region: Lower Mainland
- Regional District: Metro Vancouver
- City: Delta
- Incorporated: 1870

Government
  - Mayor: George V. Harvie
  - MP (Fed.): Jill McKnight (LPC)
  - MLA (Prov.): Ravi Kahlon (NDP)

Population (2021)
  - Total: 60,769
- Time zone: UTC−8 (PST)
  - Summer (DST): UTC−7 (PDT)

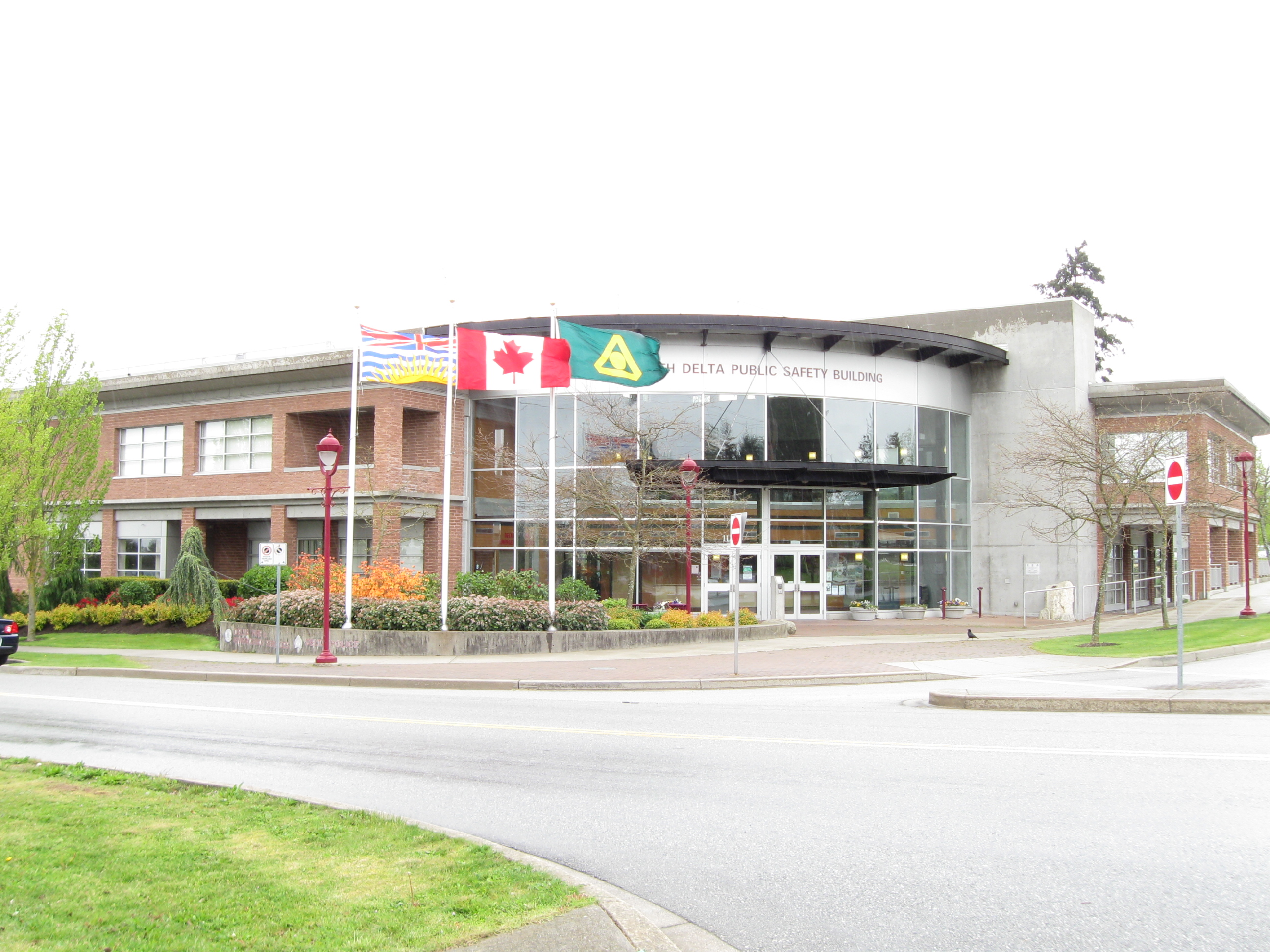
The North Delta Public Safety Building on 84 Avenue acts as a service point for police and fire services in North Delta.

North Delta (founded as Annieville) is a largely middle-class commuter town situated in the Lower Mainland, of British Columbia, Canada. The community is the most populous of the three communities (North Delta, Ladner, and Tsawwassen) that make up the City of Delta. North Delta is home to numerous parks and recreational opportunities. Alongside North Delta is Burns Bog, the largest raised urban peat bog in North America. As well, Watershed Park provides walking and biking trails, home to many artesian aquifers. Besides this, North Delta is home to a large amount of green-space. As of the 2021 census, North Delta has a population of 60,769.

== Location ==
North Delta borders Surrey on the east side by Scott Road (or 120th Street), and on the north side by 96th Avenue and the Fraser River. To the west across the river is Annacis Island and Richmond, accessible via the Alex Fraser Bridge. Burns Bog is to the west, bordered by Highway 91. Clark Drive in Panorama Ridge marks the community boundary to the south.

== Transportation ==
North Delta is mostly divided up into a grid with streets running north–south and east–west. Running east–west are the avenues, they are numbered with increasing numbers when traveling north, and vice versa. Running north–south, the streets are numbered following the grid laid out for the municipality of Delta. This grid is part of the greater street grid set out by the British Royal Engineers in the 19th century. Lower numbers are nearest the Pacific Ocean, and the street numbering continues up through the 200s in Langley.

Some of the main arterial roads in North Delta are River Road, Nordel Way, and 120th Street (Scott Road).

Before the construction of the South Fraser Perimeter Road, River Road ran along the shore of the Fraser River. It starts in Surrey, and travels through the industrial zones of North Delta and the residential community of Annieville before junctioning the Nordel Way, where a driver can access Highway 91. No longer part of North Delta, River Road continues north of Burns Bog and terminates at Highway 99, where it becomes Highway 17A. The South Fraser Perimeter Road, part of Highway 17, is a freeway that opened in 2013, running closer to the shore than River Road for the entirety of its North Delta portion.

Nordel Way is a high speed corridor that runs from River Road to Surrey, where it merges with 88th Avenue. It is mostly used by drivers commuting from the northern parts of North Delta and Surrey to Highway 91 and back. Until the late 1990s, Nordel Way terminated at 116th Street, but it was extended into Surrey.

120th Street, or Scott Road, is the street that divides Delta and Surrey to the east. Many businesses and shopping areas are along this street. The street travels into Surrey beyond 96th Avenue and joins with King George Boulevard, where one can cross the Pattullo Bridge into New Westminster.

72nd Avenue, 64th Avenue, and 56th Avenue (Highway 10) are also major connectors, having access from Highway 91 into Surrey.

There is no major transit exchange in North Delta. However, before the 2000s, the Scottsdale Exchange was located in North Delta by Scott Road before it was moved to the other side of the border, within walking distance. The bus routes provide residents of North Delta connections to nearby SkyTrain stations such as Scott Road Station and 22nd Street Station, among other destinations.

== Demographics ==
North Delta is highly multicultural and diverse. The three largest pan-ethnic groups in the community include South Asians (41.1 percent), Europeans (34.6 percent), and East Asians (10.8 percent).

Panethnic groups in North Delta (2016–2021)
Panethnic group	2021		2016	
Panethnic group	Pop.	%	Pop.	%
South Asian	24,885	41.07%	18,265	32.71%
European (Note: Statistic includes all persons that did not make up part of a visible minority or an indigenous identity.)	20,945	34.57%	25,330	45.37%
East Asian (Note: Statistic includes total responses of "Chinese", "Korean", and "Japanese" under visible minority section on census.)	6,525	10.77%	6,140	11%
Southeast Asian (Note: Statistic includes total responses of "Filipino" and "Southeast Asian" under visible minority section on census.)	2,985	4.93%	2,425	4.34%
Indigenous	1,555	2.57%	1,465	2.62%
African	750	1.24%	450	0.81%
Middle Eastern (Note: Statistic includes total responses of "West Asian" and "Arab" under visible minority section on census.)	705	1.16%	425	0.76%
Latin American	675	1.11%	580	1.04%
Other/multiracial (Note: Statistic includes total responses of "Visible minority, n.i.e." and "Multiple visible minorities" under visible minority section on census.)	1,490	2.46%	855	1.53%
Total responses	60,595	99.71%	55,835	99.68%
Total population	60,769	100%	56,017	100%

== Neighbourhoods and communities ==
- Annieville – original settlement and location of the first commercial salmon cannery in BC in 1870
- Canterbury Heights
- Nordel
- Panorama Ridge, Delta Side
- Royal York
- Scottsdale
- Sunbury
- Sunshine Hills
- Sunshine Woods

== Schools ==
North Delta has five high schools: North Delta Secondary, Seaquam Secondary, Sands Secondary, Burnsview, and Delview. Prior to the 2004–2005 school year, Sands, Burnsview, and Delview were Junior Secondary schools, offering only grades 8 to 10. Graduates from these three schools fed into North Delta Senior Secondary, which offered only a grade 11 and 12 curriculum; Seaquam Secondary was the only complete grade 8 to 12 secondary school in North Delta. North Delta Senior Secondary typically had one of the largest graduating classes in British Columbia. Despite the controversy surrounding the reconfiguration, in the academic year 2004 - 2005 the three Junior Secondary schools were reconfigured to include grade 11 and 12 classes, while North Delta Senior Secondary was expanded to include junior level courses.

Elementary schools in North Delta include McCloskey, Cougar Canyon, Devon Gardens, Chalmers, Sunshine Hills, Pinewood, Heath, Annieville, Hellings, Richardson, Gray, Jarvis, Immaculate Conception, Gibson, and Brooke.

== Recreational facilities ==
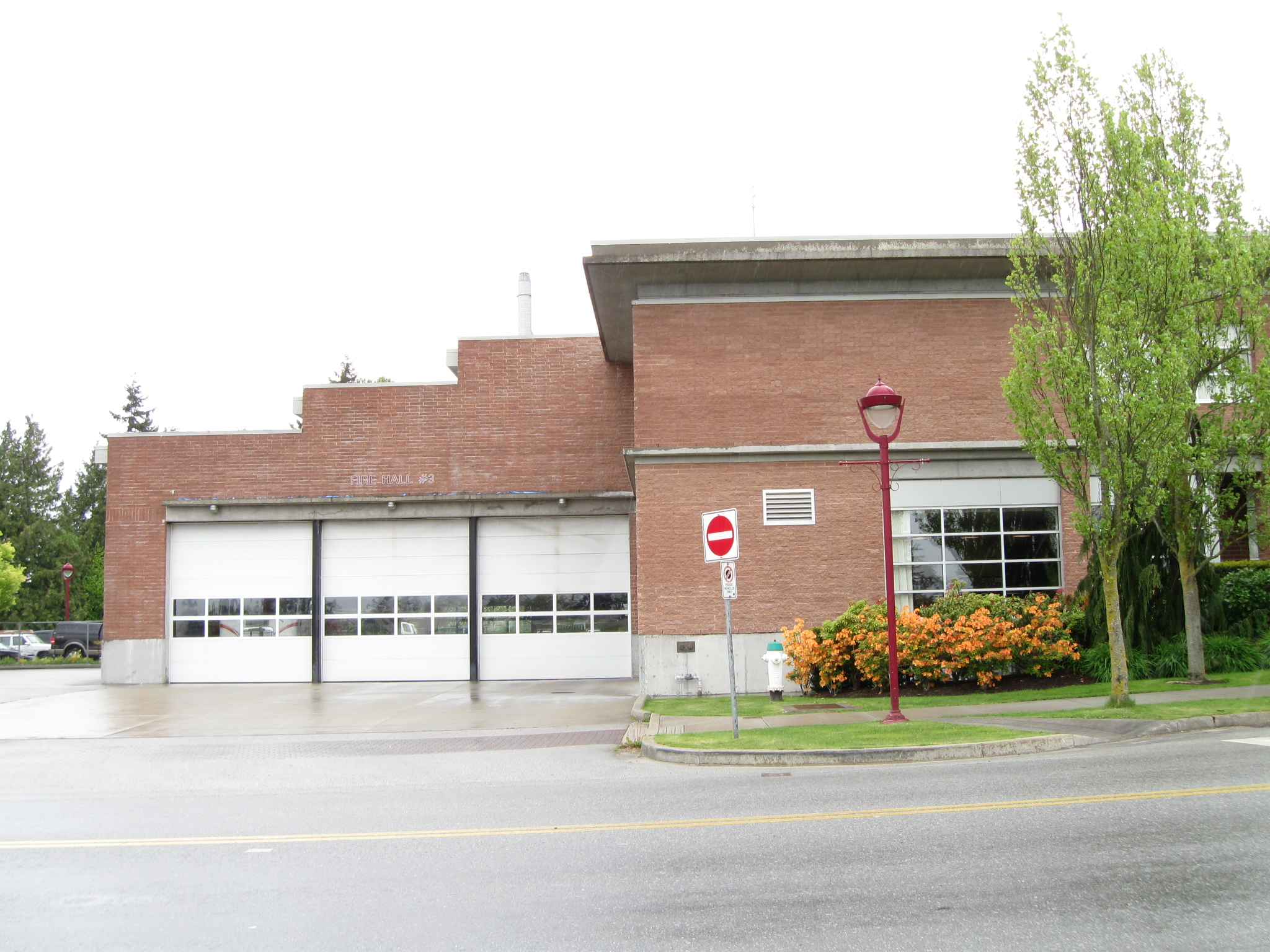
North Delta Fire Hall No.3 at 11375 84 Avenue.

North Delta is home to three recreational complexes: Sungod Recreation Centre, which houses both a swimming pool and an indoor ice rink; the Great Pacific Forum ice arena at the base of the Alex Fraser Bridge; and North Delta's oldest sports complex, the North Delta Recreational Centre, which consists of an ice rink, 6 curling sheets, and an outdoor pool. Lying adjacent to the North Delta Recreational Centre is a small kids' camp, a large softball park, skateboard park, and bike pump track.

== Retail ==
North Delta's major shopping centers are Scottsdale Centre, Scott 72 Centre, Delta Shoppers Mall and Kennedy Heights.

== Notable people ==
- Martin Cummins
- Byron Ritchie

== See also ==
- Delta North
- Newton—North Delta
- Theory of a Deadman
