= Ice Men (film) =

- DVD Cover of Ice Men
- Directed by: Thom Best
- Written by: Michael MacLennan
- Produced by: Mikhel Harilaid; Rick Warden; Thea Gill
- Starring: Martin Cummins; David Hewlett; Greg Spottiswood; James Thomas; Ian Tracey; Brandy Ledford
- Cinematography: Gavin Smith
- Edited by: Andrew Kowalchuk; Mike Munn
- Production company: Black Walk Productions
- Distributed by: Wolfe Releasing (2005)
- Release date: July 12, 2005 (United States)
- Running time: 110 minutes
- Country: Canada
- Language: English

Ice Men is a 2005 Canadian film written by Michael MacLennan and directed by (former television director and cinematographer) Thom Best. The film stars David Hewlett as Bryan, Martin Cummins as Vaughn, Greg Spottiswood as Jon, James Thomas as Steve, and Ian Tracey as Trevor. The movie gained considerable recognition through gay and lesbian film festivals.

== Plot ==
For the first time since taking possession of the family cabin, Vaughn who has just celebrated his 30th birthday, has invited his best friends up for a winter weekend of hunting and drinking. But the arrival of unexpected visitors turns a simple getaway into two days of life changing turmoil.

Vaughn and his brother Trevor were abused by their father and have become estranged. After their father’s death, Vaughn buys the family cabin from his mother with his inheritance while brother Trevor has gambled all his away and has a large debt to pay. With the unexpected visit of his brother at the cabin, Vaughn and his best friends discover they all have deep issues.

Bryan, Vaughn’s best friend, is having relations with Vaughn’s ex girlfriend (Renee) behind his back. Jon and Steve have a fling that threatens Steve’s marriage and all he knows about himself. The story culminates in Trevor’s hidden depression coming to light shocking his brother and friends into facing their own issues, all while saving somebody they didn’t realize needed saving.

== Cast ==
- Martin Cummins as Vaughn
- David Hewlett as Bryan
- Greg Spottiswood as Jon
- James Thomas as Steve
- Ian Tracey as Trevor
- Brandy Ledford as Renee
- Thea Gill as Jennifer
- Galen Dineen as Young Boy
- Henry Dineen as Young Boy
- Justin Heeley as Young Boy
- Keith Jackson as Young Boy
- Travis Ryder as Young Boy

== Reception ==
Eddie Cockrell of Variety states “Emotions run hot but story blows cold” and it has “impressive production values” for a movie destined for video sales. Preston Jones of DvdTalk.com notes "charismatic cast" with "a pleasant diversion but not much more".

Lewis Whittington of culturevulture.net stated the film is a "buddy movie wrapped inside a gay flick around a situation comedy of testosterone manners" and "strong ensemble acting and dimensional characters; Ice Men engages, but ultimately is too sketchy". It was listed on Ranker at No. 73 in the list of “The Best Movies With Ice in the Title” published in January 2019.
