= Dennis St John =

British actor (1928–2007)

- Born: 27 September 1928; Lambeth, United Kingdom
- Died: 6 November 2007 (aged 79); Montréal, Québec, Canada
- Spouse: Akiko St John Iwai (m. 1998)
- Children: 2

Dennis St John (27 September 1928 - 6 November 2007) was a British actor who most notably portrayed Franz von Papen in Yves Simoneau's Nuremberg.

St John was born 27 September 1928 in Lambeth where he studied drama at the British Theatre Association. He emigrated to Canada in 1967 where he began acting professionally at the Concordia University in Montréal. St John died at 79 in 2007 following health complications from his treatment for his leukemia.

== Filmography ==
- 1989: The Scorpio Factor - Tag
- 1989: The Tell Tale Heart - The Old Man
- 1990: You're Driving Me Crazy - Father
- 1993: Map of the Human Heart - Moravian Minister (uncredited)
- 1995: Chasseurs de loups, chasseurs d'or (TV Series) - Principal
- 1995: Hiroshima (TV Movie) - Walter Bartky
- 1996: Go West (TV Mini-Series) - Fowler
- 1998: The Minion - Gregor
- 1998: Captive (TV Movie) - Shoe Shine Man
- 1999: Quand je serai parti... vous vivrez encore - Lord Russell (uncredited)
- 1999: Back to Sherwood (TV Series) - The Abbott
- 1999: Bonanno: A Godfather's Story (TV Movie) - Station Railway Clerk
- 1999: P.T. Barnum (TV Movie) - Beefeater
- 2000: Nuremberg (TV Mini-Series) - Franz von Papen
- 2000: The List - Priest
- 2001: The Sign of Four - Sherman
- 2002: Summer (TV Movie) - Professor Ridley
- 2002: Heartstrings (Short) - The Salesman
- 2004: The Aviator - Nick the Custodian
- 2004: Il Duce canadese (TV Mini-Series) - Piano teacher
- 2005: The Greatest Game Ever Played - Wallis' Butler
- 2005: Ten Days to Victory (TV Movie documentary) - Old Man
- 2006: Bethune (TV Movie) - Old Man
- 2006: 300 - Spartan Baby Inspector
- 2007: I'm Not There - Captain Henry
- 2007: Still Life - Museum Snob 1
