= Delview Secondary School =

Delview Secondary
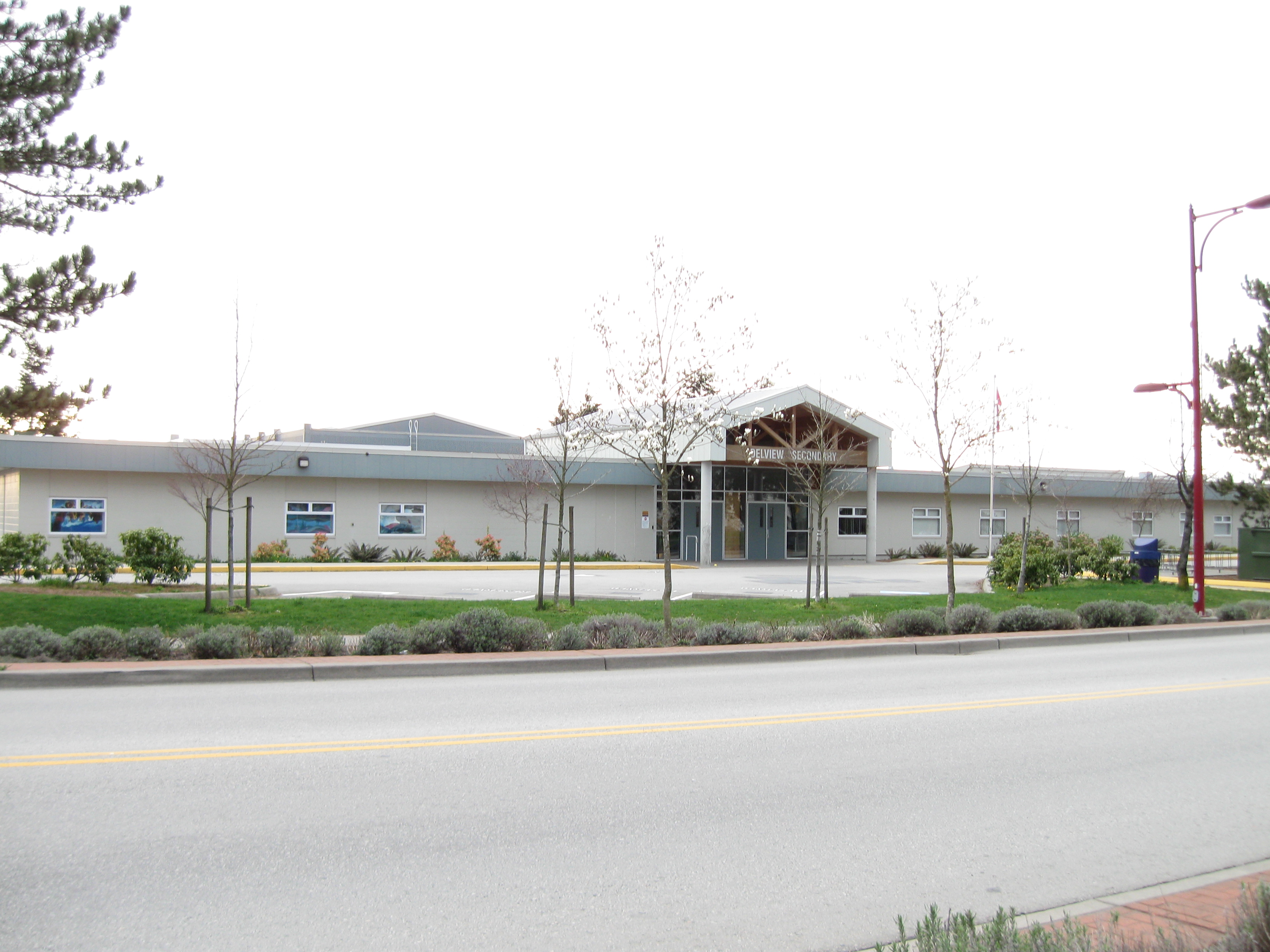

Location
- 9111 116 Street; Delta, British Columbia, V4C 5W8; Canada; 49.1692°N 122.9023°W

Information
- School type: Public, high school
- Motto: "Once a Raider, Always a Raider."
- Opened: 1969; 57 years ago
- School board: School District 37 Delta
- School number: 3737021
- Principal: John Pavao
- Grades: 8–12
- Enrollment: approx. 700 (May 2026)
- Language: English
- Colours: Red; Black; White
- Team name: Delview Raiders
- Feeder schools: Annieville, Gibson, Royal Heights, Devon Gardens
- Website: dl.deltasd.bc.ca

Delview Secondary is a public high school located on 116th Street in Delta in British Columbia, Canada. Founded in 1969, the school has approximately 700 students enrolled, as of 2026.

The school mascot is a Raider, reflecting the Scandinavian roots in the school's area, when Norse settlers came to the Annieville area.

== Governance ==
It is managed by the School District 37 Delta.

== History ==
The school was established in 1969, with the first Principal Ernie Marshall combining the names "Delta" and "Riverview" to make Delview. That September, the school opened, sharing premises at North Delta Secondary School. In February 1970, the school moved to its permanent site at 116th Street with a budget of $130,000.

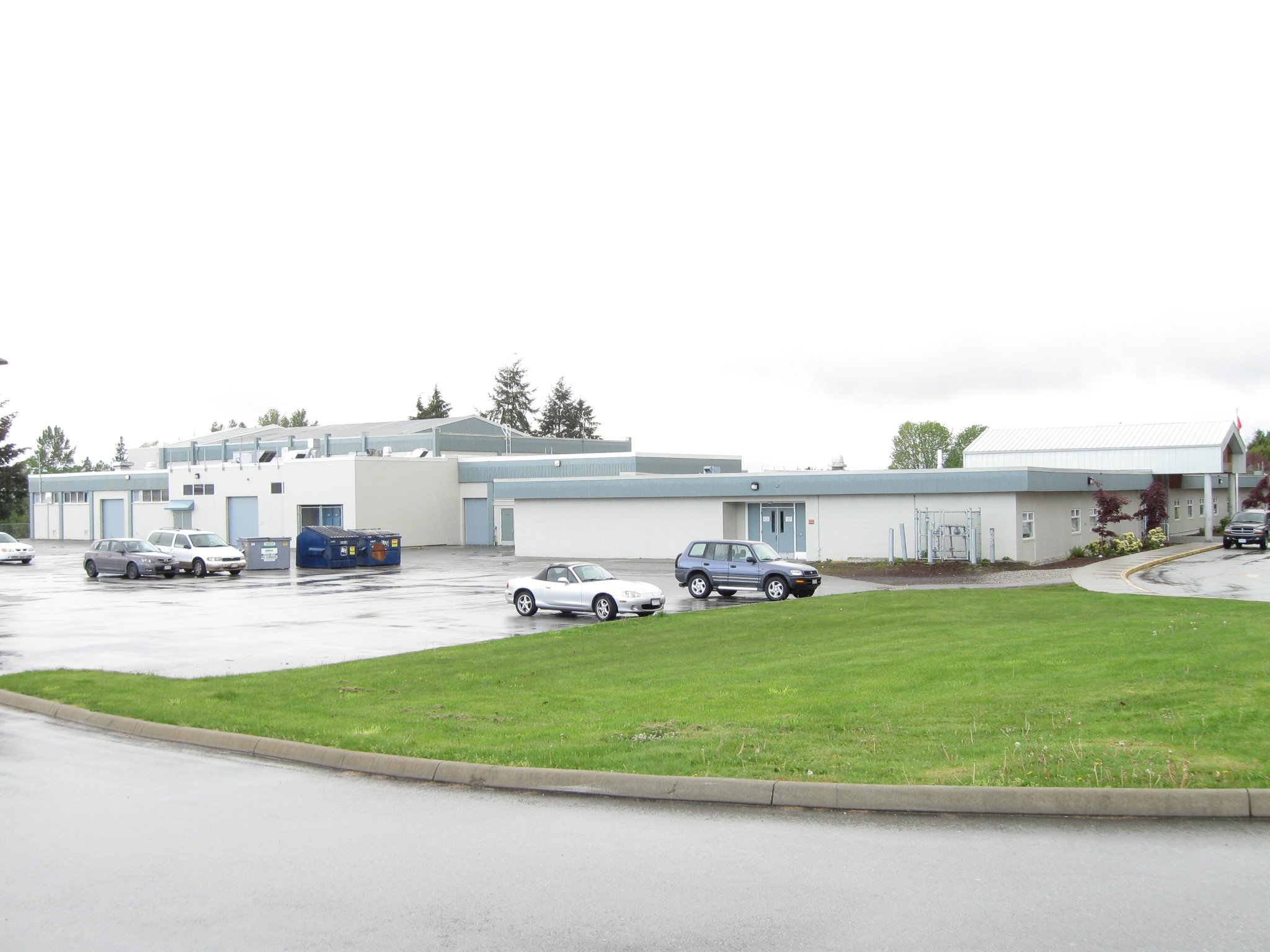
Northwest facing view of Delview Secondary (old)

Seismic upgrading of the school was approved in April 2006 and was completed by fall 2007.

Classes for students in grades 11 and 12 were added in 2006–07 and the school now supports a full 8–12 curriculum, no longer requiring students to switch over to North Delta Secondary School after 10th grade.

== Curriculum ==
Delview offers a wide range of academic classes to its students.

Delview's elective courses depend on the interest in the course, with a wide range of choices as well. Grade 8's do not get to choose their own electives for their first year at Delview, but instead go through a full rotation of all of the electives offered at Delview for three weeks each.

Electives are organized into Fine Arts and Applied Skills (ADST) for Grade 8s, until students can choose their own electives in Grade 9.

Delview operated on a two-semester timetable, consisting of 8 courses total over both semesters, with 4 courses a day, labelled as blocks A, B, C and D.

The school offers a special course called Innovation 10, the only school to offer it. It is a cross-curricular course covering Science 10, Social Studies 10, and English 10 along with an Independent Directed Study (IDS) elective all together. Students are part of a cohort of students meeting every day for two consecutive blocks during the semester (students completing the course will earn credit for 4 courses in 2 blocks which adds up to 2 extra blocks in their schedules).

== Sport and extracurricular activities ==
Delview Secondary offers a number of sports programs including athletics, soccer, volleyball, basketball, wrestling and badminton.

The school also has a variety of extracurricular clubs:

- The Delview Leos Club, a youth branch of the Lions Club International, committing to helping the community through service and leadership, youth branch of Surrey Central Lions Club. Events from the club have included tree planting, spaghetti dinners, community picnics, and park cleanups.
- Delview's Robotics Club, learning about how to create and code technology to be able to create robotics that can complete tasks and obstacles, and competing with other schools.
- DYAC (Delta Youth Advisory Council), a program in all 7 Delta high schools after school playing an important role in communicating student's thoughts to the Delta Board of Education and creating a community for students.
- Grad Committee (grade 12s only), a club that focuses on creating grad events and on creating a positive environment for their graduating class.
- Morning Announcements Committee, a growing community of voices regularly displayed on the morning announcements to let the school know about upcoming events in the school.
- Relay For Life Committee - Annual event raising funds for cancer awareness with the Canadian Cancer Society.
- STEMastery - Teaches local Gibson students about science through after-school programs.
- Torchbearers Remembrance Society - Observes history and Canada's role in war, conflict and peacekeeping.
- Voxtet - Choir performing at student events and assemblies.
- Model UN - Delegates go to conferences to roleplay as countries in international diplomacy, have debates and policy discussions.
- Math Club - Activities and games enhancing math skills.
- Bhangra Club - Learns dance routines to perform at asselmblies and school events.
- Green Society - Organizes sustainability initiatives in the school and community.
- Art Of Our Community - Plans student art service collaborations for events/advocacy.
- Analog Club - Film photography composition, development, and scanning.
- Anti-Racism Committee, a club for spreading cultural awareness and breaking down stereotypes of race in a school setting.

=== Leadership ===
In Grades 11 and 12, Delview students are able to join Leadership, an in-block course focused on contributing to the school and building leadership skills that are useful in everyday life.

=== Theatre Company (grades 9–12) ===
Theatre Company consists of a collection of X-block courses. There are 3 types of theatre courses offered at Delview as listed below:

- Theatre Company 9-12 offers students the whole performing package, with a variation of musical theatre and plays. Delview has performed musicals and plays such as The Addams Family, The Last Lifeboat, Urinetown, Delvusical, TDM Mixtape, D.O.A., and The Drowsy Chaperone.
- Theatre Production & Design 10-11 offers students a separate look into the makings of a production, eventually getting to help set up and organise the production set as well as do many creative projects in the program.
- Theatre Scriptwriting and Directing 11-12 offers students a chance to write and direct short plays and learn the techniques to making masterpieces on stage, eventually presenting a self-written play at the end.
- *Theatre Company "Club" (Grade 8) offers students the same benefits as Theatre Company 9–12, but does not give course credits- instead students can get volunteer hours while still acting in the play.

=== Yearbook (grades 10–12) ===
Yearbook is an X-Block course offered to students to give them a chance to learn visual and graphic design through photography, photoshop, and writing, coming together to form the yearbook, a book composed and sold to Delview students consisting of photos from the year.

== Thanks 4 Giving ==
Thanks 4 Giving is an annual event hosted in October at Delview Secondary where students, parents, and staff come together to collect non-perishable food items, recyclables and cash donations from across North Delta for the Surrey Food Bank and Deltassist. Class competitions also take place in school to raise cans and funds to support the cause before the main night.

On the night of T4G, teams of students collect donations door-to-door and bring them back to the school where they will be counted, sorted and boxed for pick up the following morning.

Started by teachers Ron McNeill, Barb Woodford and Sandy Ferguson in 1992 under the name "Ten-in-One" (10,000 items collected in one night), it has grown as a volunteer event that influences people from across North Delta to contribute and help out local food banks.

For the 31st year of Thanks 4 Giving on October 11, 2023, Delview's T4G committee raised 26,552 cans after the final count, setting a new record for the school.

Since 1992, T4G has collected over 480,000 non-perishable foods and is the largest one-day food drive in all of Canada.

== Notable alumni ==
- Chris Crippin, drummer for Hedley
- Jenaya Robertson, 5-year TWU Women's Soccer Captain and recipient of the Chantal Navert Memorial Award for best Women's soccer player
