= Davis Sanchez =

Canadian gridiron football player (born 1974)

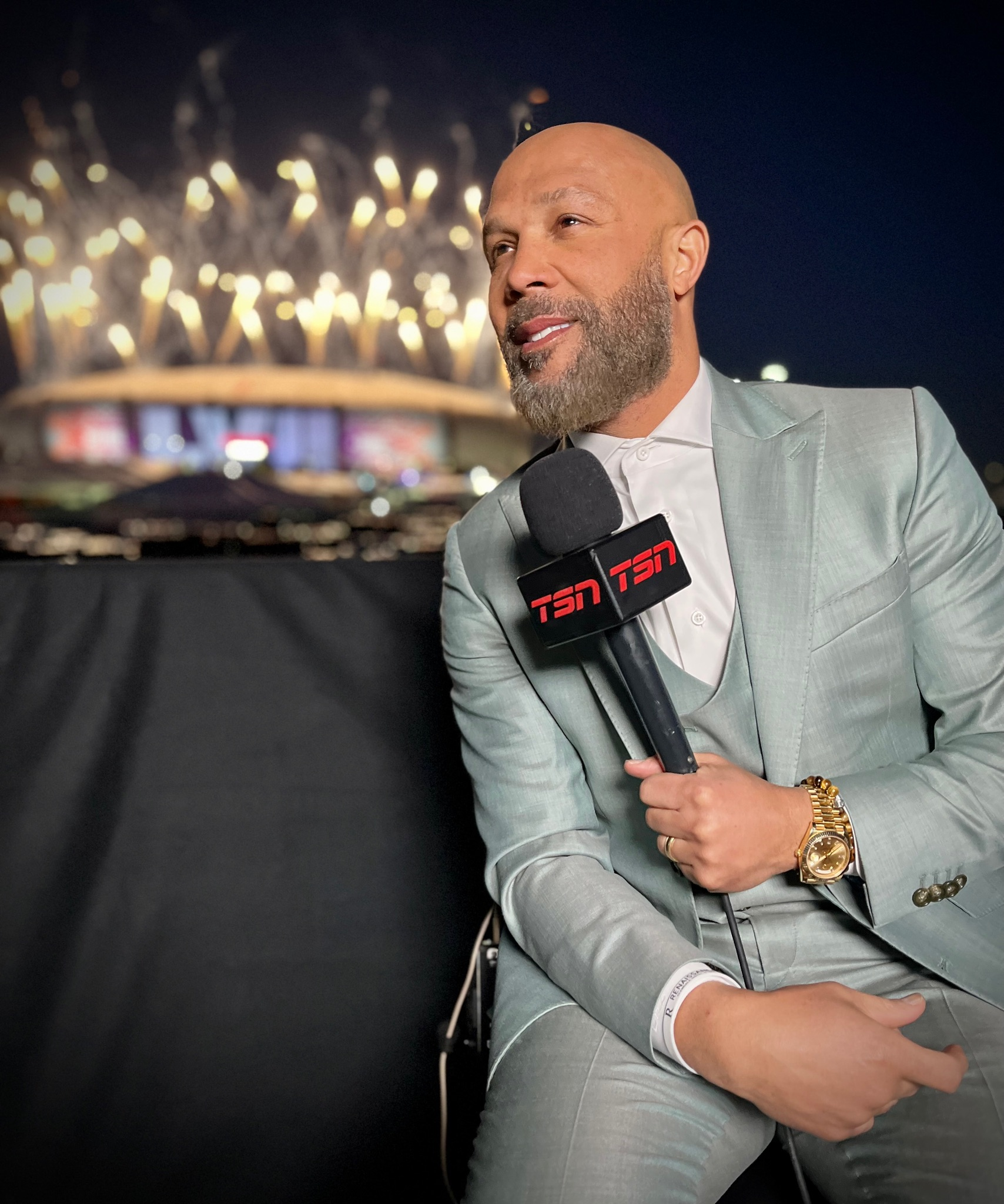
- Sanchez covering Super Bowl week from Los Angeles

No. 33, 2
- Position: Cornerback

Personal information
- Born: August 7, 1974 (age 52); Delta, British Columbia, Canada
- Listed height: 5 ft 10 in (1.78 m)
- Listed weight: 188 lb (85 kg)

Career information
- High school: North Delta
- College: Oregon
- CFL draft: 1999: 1st round, 6th overall pick

Career history
- 1999–2000: Montreal Alouettes
- 2001–2002: San Diego Chargers
- 2003: Calgary Stampeders
- 2004: Montreal Alouettes
- 2005: Edmonton Eskimos
- 2006–2009: Montreal Alouettes
- 2010–2011: BC Lions

Awards and highlights
- 3× Grey Cup champion (2005, 2009, 2011); Lew Hayman Trophy (2000); CFL All-Star (2000); 3× CFL East All-Star (2000, 2004, 2008)

Career CFL statistics
- Games played: 155
- Def tackles: 330
- Sacks: 2
- Interceptions: 28
- Stats at CFL.ca (archived)
- Stats at Pro Football Reference

Davis Sanchez (born August 7, 1974) is a Canadian former professional football player who played cornerback in both the Canadian Football League (CFL) and National Football League (NFL). He is the co-founder of the TSN Edge and is an NFL and CFL game analyst at TSN.

Sanchez was the first Canadian-born player to start at cornerback in the NFL. In 2001, during his rookie season, Sanchez made starts versus the Raiders and Eagles. Sanchez played basketball and football in college and was eventually inducted into the Butte College Football Hall of Fame. He is now a broadcaster at TSN and has had NFL and CFL broadcasts on there since 2018.

== Early life and education ==
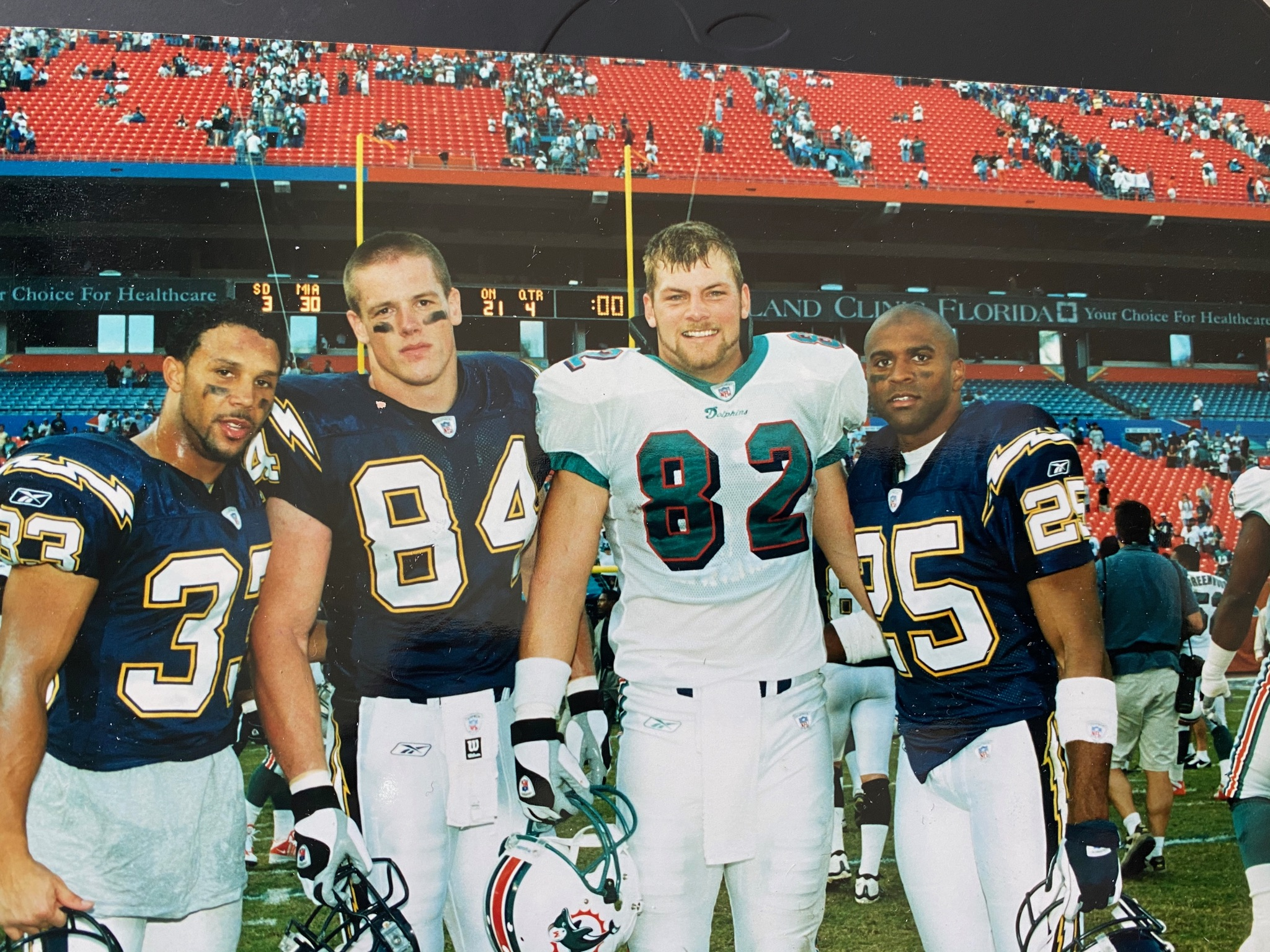
University of Oregon Ducks in the NFL. Left to right: Chargers Davis Sanchez, Justin Peelle, Jed Weaver, and Alex Molden.

Sanchez attended North Delta Secondary School where he played basketball, but not football. He played one year of college basketball and then turned his attention completely to football. As a member of the Butte College sports hall of fame, he was a 1st team All-American and California JC Defensive Player of the year before signing with the Oregon Ducks. After his Oregon career was cut short after a broken leg, he entered the CFL Draft and was selected in the 1st round.

== Professional football career ==
Sanchez was selected 6th overall in the 1999 CFL College Draft by the Montreal Alouettes. He had nine interceptions in 2000, topping the CFL. That year, he won the Lew Hayman Trophy as the best Canadian in the East Division. In 2001, he signed with the San Diego Chargers, with whom he played two seasons. He returned to the CFL in 2003 with the Calgary Stampeders. In 2004, he was traded to Montreal. In 2005, he signed with the Edmonton Eskimos. On February 18, 2006, he was traded again to Montreal for Reggie Durden and Rob Brown. This was Sanchez's third spell with the Alouettes, who he played with for four seasons.

In his career, Sanchez has played on three Grey Cup-winning teams. The first was in 2005 with the Edmonton Eskimos, though he was injured and did not play in the Grey Cup Game. He was able to take part in the Montreal Alouettes' 2009 Grey Cup victory, saying afterward, "I'm so excited, there's no words." Sanchez has been named to the East Division All-Star team on three occasions.

On February 9, 2010, Sanchez signed with his hometown team, the BC Lions, after requesting his release from the Montreal Alouettes. In 2011, he won his third Grey Cup. After two seasons with the Lions, he announced his retirement on May 14, 2012.

== Broadcasting career ==
Sanchez joined TSN In 2017 and has been full time on both the NFL and CFL broadcasts since 2019. Sanchez and TSN colleague Milt Stegall host a podcast and YouTube show called "Stegall and Sanchez Wide Open".

In May 2017, Sanchez was announced as the new game analyst on TSN 690 for the Alouettes' radio broadcasts. In 2018, Sanchez joined the CFL on TSN panel as a game analyst for TSN's CFL television broadcasts. In 2019, he joined the NFL on TSN broadcasts and in 2020, started covering the NFL for TSN and CTV on a full-time basis. Along with being a TSN football analyst he is also the co-founder of The TSN Edge which launched in 2020 and is TSN's Sports betting and fantasy hub.

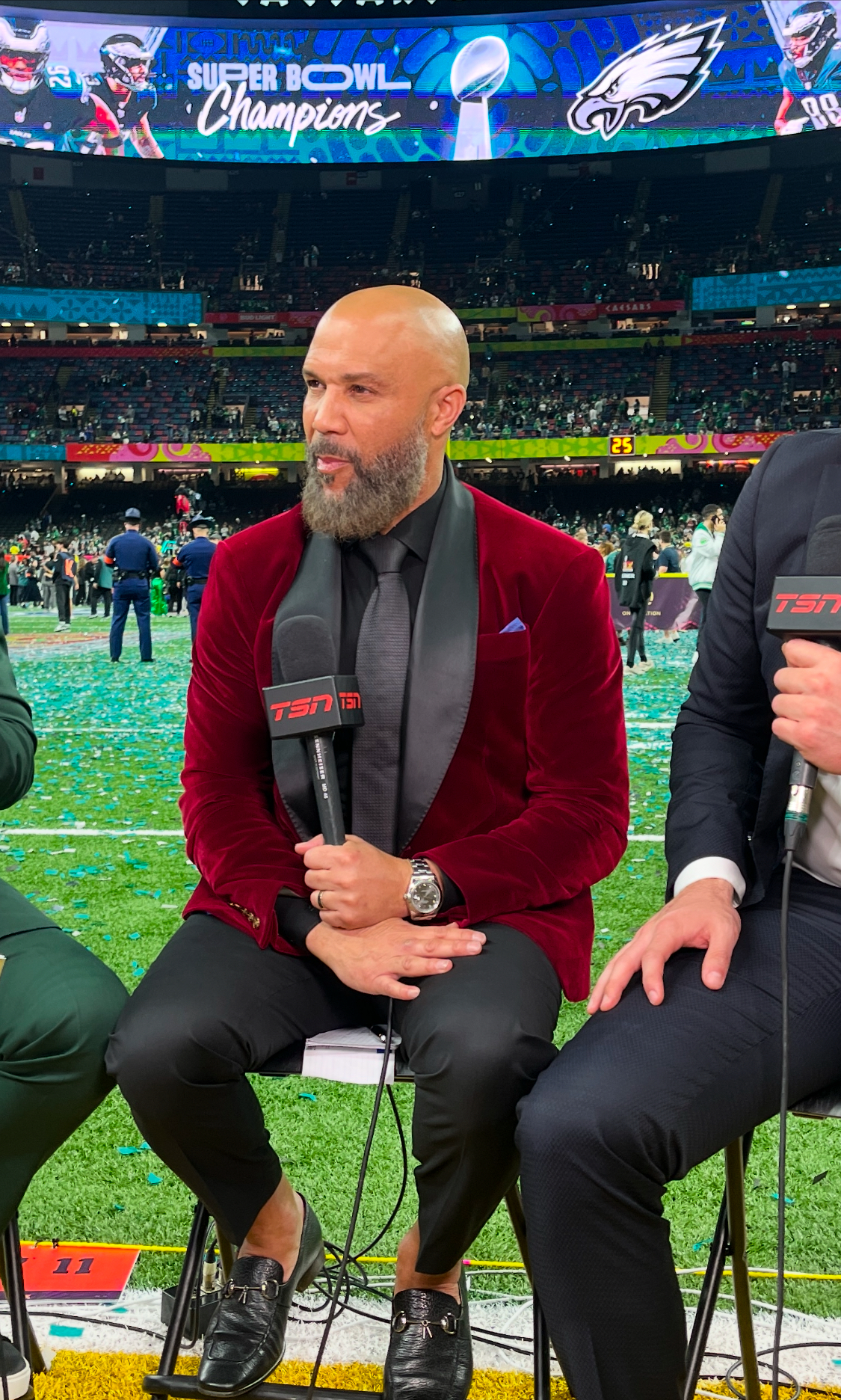
Davis Sanchez on the field at the Super Bowl in New Orleans for TSN's broadcast.

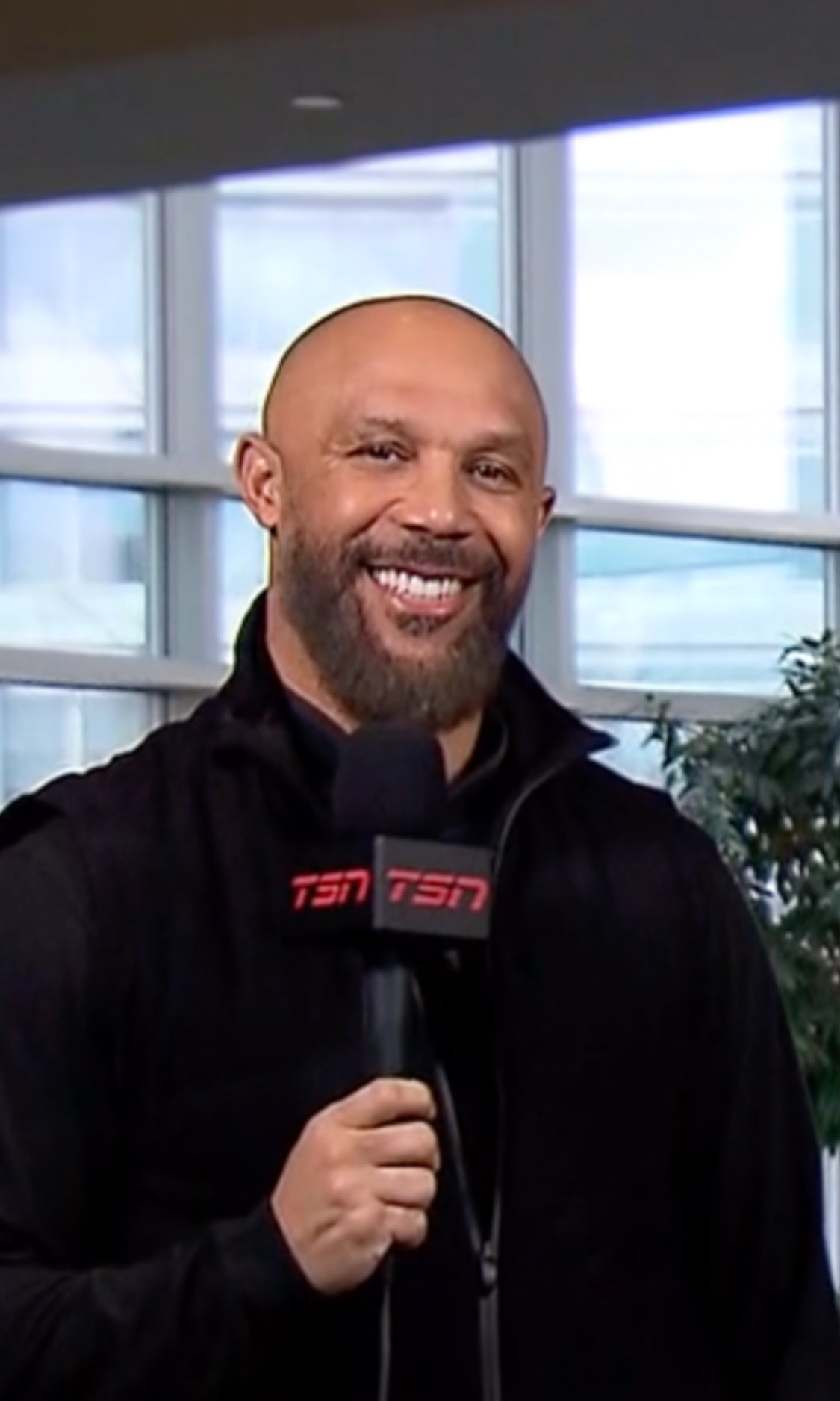
TSN's Davis Sanchez from the NFL Combine in Indianapolis

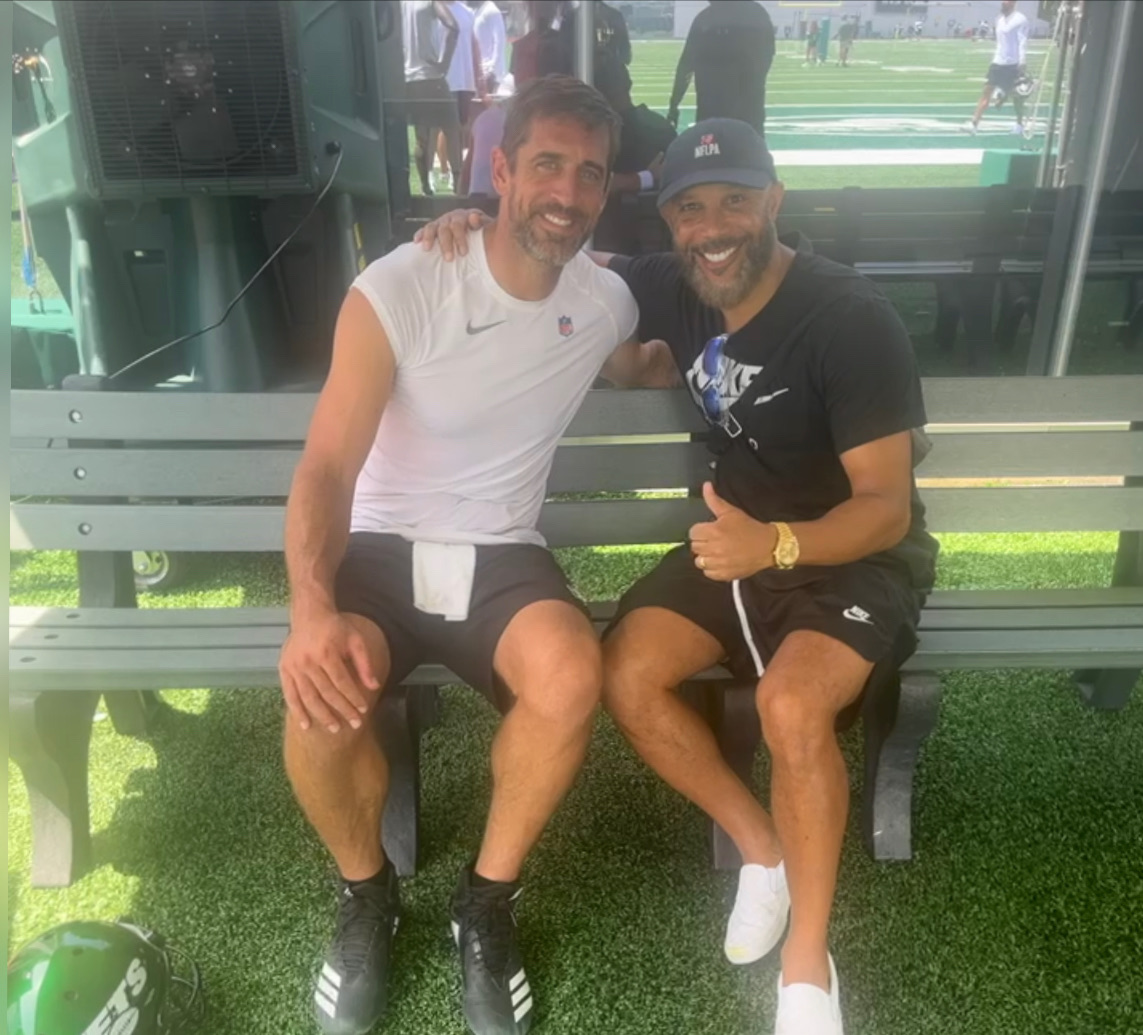
Butte College Football Hall of Famer's Aaron Rodgers and TSN's Davis Sanchez
