= Brandy Ledford =

American actress and model

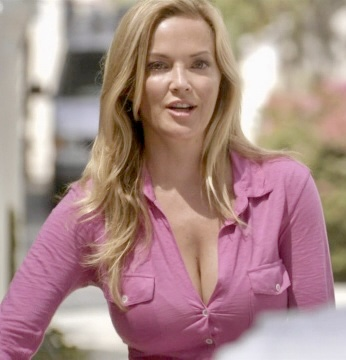
- Ledford in 2009
- Born: Brandy Lee Ledford; February 4, 1969 (age 57); Denver, Colorado, U.S.
- Other names: Jisel; Brandy Sanders
- Occupations: Actress; model
- Years active: 1981–present
- Known for: Doyle on Andromeda
- Spouse(s): Damian Sanders (divorced) Martin Cummins (m. 1998; div. 2004) Unknown spouse (as of 2020)
- Children: 2

Brandy Lee Ledford (born February 4, 1969) is an American actress, model, and Penthouse magazine's 1992 "Pet of the Year". She played the role of Desiree on Modern Family, starred as Dawn Masterton on Baywatch Hawaii, and as Doyle in the science fiction television series Andromeda.

== Career ==
In addition to Andromeda and Baywatch Hawaii, Ledford also starred in the SciFi Channel series The Invisible Man and the critically acclaimed Whistler, for which she was nominated for Best Actress, at both the Leo Awards and Gemini Awards.

== Personal life ==
Ledford was born in Denver, Colorado. In the early 1990s, she was married to snowboarder Damian Sanders, and appeared in Critical Condition and Snowboarders in Exile as herself. From 1998 until 2004, she was married to Canadian actor Martin Cummins, with whom she has a child. As of 2020, she was married and had a second child. Ledford suffers from alcoholism but has attained sobriety.

== Filmography ==
=== Film ===
Year	Title	Role	Notes
1993	Indecent Behavior	Elaine Croft	
1993	Demolition Man	Fiber Op Girl	
1994	National Lampoon's Last Resort	Mermaid	
1995	Killing for Love	Celena	
1996	Irresistible Impulse	Heather McNeill	Video
2000	My 5 Wives	Blanche	
2001	Zebra Lounge	Wendy Barnet	
2001	Rat Race	Vicky	
2004	Ice Men	Renee	
2006	Fracture	Candy	Video short

=== Television ===
Year	Title	Role	Notes
1994	The George Carlin Show	Tammi	Episode: "George Runs Into an Old Friend"
1994	Silk Stalkings	Tamara Knight	Episode: "Vengeance"
1995	Married... with Children	Brandi	Episode: "The Naked and the Dead, But Mostly the Naked"
1995	High Tide	Sandra Peck	Episode: "The Grind"
1995	Walker, Texas Ranger	Lisa Burns	Episode: "Point After"
1995	The George Wendt Show	Kiki	Episode: "My Brother, the Albatross"
1996	Pier 66	Alex Davies	Television film
1996	Panic in the Skies!	Charlene Davis	Television film
1997–1998	Fast Track	Mimi Chandler	Main role
1998	The Outer Limits	Elana Chomsky	Episode: "Nightmare"
1998	Welcome to Paradox	Sgt. Darcy	Episode: "Our Lady of the Machine"
1998	First Wave	Michelle	Episode: "Cul-De-Sac"
1999	Viper	Tina Bloom	Episode: "Tiny Bubbles"
1999	Poltergeist: The Legacy	Vicky	Episode: "Gaslight"
1999–2000	Baywatch: Hawaii	Dawn Masterton	supporting cast role appeared in 15 episodes (season 10)
2000	First Target	Kelsey Innes	Television film
2001	Strange Frequency	Christine	Episode: "Disco Inferno"
2001	Zebra Lounge	Wendy Barnet	Television film
2001–2002	The Invisible Man	Alex Monroe	Main role (season 2)
2002	Smallville	Mrs. Gibson	Episode: "Stray"
2002	We'll Meet Again	Molly Lasch	Television film
2004	Faultline	Lynn Larson McAllister	Television film
2004	Behind the Camera: The Unauthorized Story of Charlie's Angels	Candy Spelling	Television film
2004	Cold Squad	Cori Thompson	Episode: "No Life Like It"
2004	Stargate SG-1	Zarin	Episode: "Endgame"
2004–2005	Andromeda	Doyle	Recurring role (season 5)
2006	Stargate Atlantis	Norina	Episode: "Inferno"
2006–2007	Whistler	Shelby Varland	Recurring role (season 1)
2008	A Woman's Rage	Kathryn Brown	Television film
2009	Modern Family	Desiree	Episode: "The Bicycle Thief"
2013	NCIS: Los Angeles	Allison Hall	Episode: "Drive"

1970s	Evelyn Treacher	Stephanie McLean	Tina McDowall	Patricia Barrett	Avril Lund
1970s	Anneka Di Lorenzo	Laura Bennett Doone	Victoria Lynn Johnson	Dominique Maure	Cheryl Rixon
1980s	Isabella Ardigo	Danielle Deneux	Corinne Alphen	Sheila Kennedy	Linda Kenton
1980s	None	Cody Carmack	Mindy Farrar	Patty Mullen	Ginger Miller
1990s	Stephanie Page	Simone Brigitte	Jisel	Julie Strain	Sasha Vinni
1990s	Gina LaMarca	Andi Sue Irwin	Elizabeth Ann Hilden	Paige Summers	Nikie St. Gilles
2000s	Juliet Cariaga	Zdeňka Podkapová	Megan Mason	Sunny Leone	Victoria Zdrok
2000s	Martina Warren	Jamie Lynn	Heather Vandeven	Erica Ellyson	Taya Parker
2010s	Taylor Vixen	Nikki Benz	Jenna Rose	Nicole Aniston	Lexi Belle
2010s	Layla Sin	Kenna James	Jenna Sativa	Gina Valentina	Gianna Dior
2020s	Lacy Lennon	Kenzie Anne	Amber Marie	Tahlia Paris	Renee Olstead
2020s	Kassie Wallis	-	-	-	-
