= Burnsview Secondary School =

Location
- Street; Delta, British Columbia, V4C 4V8; Canada; 49.141791°N 122.911607°W

Information
- School type: Public, high school
- Motto: "All it takes is all you’ve got!"
- Founded: 1972
- School board: School District 37 Delta
- School number: 3737034
- Principal: A. Akune
- Staff: 66 (including support staff)
- Grades: 8–12
- Enrollment: 873 (October 2022)
- Language: English, French
- Area: North Delta
- Colours: Red, navy blue
- Mascot: Griffin
- Team name: Burnsview Griffins
- Website: bu.deltasd.bc.ca
- Last updated: October 27, 2022

Burnsview Secondary School is a public high school in North Delta, British Columbia, Canada. Burnsview Secondary School is part of School District 37 Delta. It was originally a junior high school when it was built in the 1970s, but now accommodates grades 8 through 12. It is the only French Immersion secondary school in North Delta.

== History ==
=== School history ===
Burnsview Secondary School opened in 1972 as a junior high school, accommodating grades 7 through 10. In 1992, at its 20th anniversary celebration, a time capsule was created by students to remain sealed until its opening in 2012. At the 40th Anniversary Reunion, held on Friday, November 23, 2012, the time capsule was unsealed. Burnsview suffered a fire in the summer of 1997, in which a whole school wing was destroyed. The rebuilding took over a year. The school was part of the Delta School District's reconfiguration project, and accepted Grade 11 students in 2005 and Grade 12 students in 2006.

== World Vision 30 Hour Famine ==
Burnsview has actively participated in the World Vision 30 Hour Famine since the early 1990s. In 1992 students raised $10,000 for people in Somalia. In 1995, the student body managed to increase donations to $12,000, and sent this money to Rwanda. Students also gave up junk food for three weeks to add to their collection totals. The total money raised placed Burnsview as the second top fundraising school in Canada, just behind Collingwood School.

In 1997, Canadian rocker Tom Cochrane performed a private concert for participants at the 30 Hour Famine. 150 students raised over $11,000, giving the school the highest per student average in Canada for that year. In 1998, before the start of the famine, students had raised over $18,500.

The 2003 famine raised $20,000 for AIDS in Africa. In 2007, students raised over $30,000 in an effort to regain the title as top fund raising school in Canada. In 2008, students raised over $40,000 for World Vision.

== Enrichment programs ==
In 2003, Burnsview began to host for a district-wide Aboriginal Education program to educate Aboriginal students about their history. This program only accepts Aboriginal students. That same year, Burnsview was awarded part of the Delta School District's $300,000 to purchase computers for students in Grade 8 English classes. This was part of a multi-year project to improve student achievement in literacy, specifically in proofreading, editing, and revising.

== Prime Minister's Award for Teaching Excellence ==
Four teachers have won Prime Minister's Awards for Teaching Excellence while they have taught at Burnsview Secondary. They are:

1. Shain Chisholm, a French Immersion and Humanities teacher, in 1999.
2. John Westlake in 2000.
3. Wendy Van Haastregt, a science teacher, in 2001.
4. Angelika Hedley, a special education teacher, in 2002.

== Notable alumni ==
- Ian Boothby, comedian, writer for The Simpsons and Exorsisters comic books, The New Yorker, MAD Magazine and the Sparks! series of children's books.
- Jeff Francis, pitcher for the Colorado Rockies.
- Tyler Connolly, lead singer of Theory of a Deadman.
- Nicolas Petan, centre for the Vancouver Canucks.
- Danielle Kisser, Paralympic swimmer for Canada.
- Juvy Kooner, A Soccer player for the S.C. Braga.
- Tristan Jarry, goaltender for the Pittsburgh Penguins.
