= School District 37 Delta =

School district in British Columbia, Canada

- School District 37 Delta Logo

Location
- 4585 Harvest Drive, Ladner, British Columbia Ladner, North Delta, Tsawwassen in Metro/Coast Canada

District information
- Superintendent: Doug Sheppard
- Asst. superintendent(s): Jane Gray, Brad Bauman
- Schools: 31
- Budget: CA$203.1 million (2025)

Students and staff
- Students: 16,000+ (2025)
- Staff: 2,260 (2025)

Other information
- Website: www.deltasd.bc.ca

School District No. 37 (Delta) is a school district in British Columbia south of Vancouver. The district serves the Municipality of Delta including the three communities of Ladner, Tsawwassen, and North Delta.

== Population ==
As of 2025 the Delta School District has more than 16,000 students, gaining over 300 students since 2024, when the district total was 15,732, composed of 8,750 elementary and 7,162 secondary school students.

== Trustees ==
Delta Board of Education

Type
- Type: Unicameral

Leadership
- Chair: Joe Muego since November 2022
- Vice Chair: Val Windsor since 2011

Structure
- Seats: 7 trustees
- Political groups: Achieving For Delta (6) Independent (1)

Elections
- Voting system: Plurality at-large voting
- Last election: October 15, 2022
- Next election: October 17, 2026

Meeting place
- 4585 Harvest Drive, Ladner, British Columbia

Website
- www.deltasd.bc.ca/board/trustees/

Constitution
- School Act

The Delta Board of Education is composed of seven elected trustees, who are each assigned to specific schools in the district. Trustees of the Vancouver School Board are elected under an at-large system.

As of 2025, the current elected trustees for Delta are:

Name	Party
Erica Beard	Achieving For Delta
Val Windsor	Achieving For Delta
Ammen Dhillon	Achieving For Delta
Masako Gooch	Achieving For Delta
Nimmi Daula	Achieving For Delta
Joe Muego	Achieving For Delta
Nick Kanakos	Independent

== Schools ==
School/Program	Location	Grades
Annieville Elementary School	North Delta	K-7
Beach Grove Elementary School	Tsawwassen	K-7
Brooke Elementary School	North Delta	K-7
Burnsview Secondary School	North Delta	8-12
Chalmers Elementary School	North Delta	K-7
Cliff Drive Elementary School	Tsawwassen	K-7
Cougar Canyon Elementary School	North Delta	K-7
Delta Secondary School	Ladner	8-12
Delview Secondary School	North Delta	8-12
Devon Gardens Elementary School	North Delta	K-7
English Bluff Elementary School	Tsawwassen	K-7
Gibson Elementary School	North Delta	K-7
Gray Elementary School	North Delta	K-7
Hawthorne Elementary School	Ladner	K-7
Heath Elementary School	North Delta	K-7
Hellings Elementary School	North Delta	K-7
Holly Elementary School	Ladner	K-7
Jarvis Traditional Elementary School	North Delta	K-7
Ladner Elementary School	Ladner	K-7
McCloskey Elementary School	North Delta	K-7
Neilson Grove Elementary School	Ladner	K-7
North Delta Secondary School	North Delta	8-12
Pebble Hill Traditional Elementary School	Tsawwassen	K-7
Pinewood Elementary School	North Delta	K-7
Port Guichon Elementary School	Ladner	K-7
Richardson Elementary School	North Delta	K-7
Sands Secondary School	North Delta	8-12
Seaquam Secondary School	North Delta	8-12
South Delta Secondary School	Tsawwassen	8-12
South Park Elementary School	Tsawwassen	K-7
Sunshine Hills Elementary School	North Delta	K-7
Continuing Education	Ladner	
Delta Community College	North Delta	
International Student Programs	Ladner	
Facilities, Sustainability & Emergency Planning	Ladner	
Provincial Resource Program for Autism and Related Disorders	Ladner	

== See also ==
- List of school districts in British Columbia
