= Martin Cummins =

Canadian actor (born 1969)

- Born: November 28, 1969 (age 55); North Delta, British Columbia, Canada
- Education: Seaquam Secondary School
- Occupation: Actor
- Years active: 1987–present
- Spouses: Brandy Ledford (m. 1998; div. 2004) Christine Wallace (m. 2013)
- Children: 4

Martin Cummins (born November 28, 1969) is a Canadian actor known for his role as Ames White in Dark Angel and as Nick Boyle in Poltergeist: The Legacy.

== Life and career ==
Cummins went to Seaquam Secondary School in the town of North Delta, British Columbia. He attended the Vancouver Actors Studio. One of his early significant roles was as host of the teen variety series Pilot One on CBC Television.

Cummins guest-starred in a number of American and Canadian television shows before landing the part of Nick Boyle in the MGM series Poltergeist: The Legacy, which was filmed in Vancouver, in the late 1990s. He used the money and resources he gained while working on Poltergeist: The Legacy to fund and staff his own film We All Fall Down, based on the events of his own life after his mother's death.

Cummins' other appearances include the TV series When Calls the Heart, Andromeda, The 4400, Dice, Friday the 13th Part VIII: Jason Takes Manhattan, Kyle XY, Smallville, Stargate SG-1, Life As We Know It, Live Once, Die Twice, UnREAL, Omen IV: The Awakening, and Devour. In this film, he co-starred with Jensen Ackles from Dark Angel.

Cummins won a Genie Award for Performance by an Actor in a Supporting Role in 2000 for Love Come Down. In 2011, he began a recurring role as Thomas on the ABC series V. He portrayed Carroll McKane in Gary Sherman's horror thriller film 39: A Film by Carroll McKane. As of 2014, Cummins has been co-starring on the series When Calls the Heart and Riverdale, the latter as Sheriff Keller.

== Filmography ==
=== Film ===
Year	Title	Role	Notes
1989	Friday the 13th Part VIII: Jason Takes Manhattan	Wayne Webber	
1991	Omen IV: The Awakening	Drifter	
1994	Cyberteens in Love	Kon	
2000	Love Come Down	Matthew Carter	
2000	We All Fall Down	Kris	
2002	Liberty Stands Still	Russell Williams	
2004	Ice Men	Vaughn	
2005	Devour	Aiden Kater	
2006	39: A Film by Carroll McKane	Carroll McKane	
2008	Vice	Agent Arnaud	
2014	Down Here	Tim Brown	
2015	Through the Uncanny Valley	Bloom	short film
2017	Cold Zone	Rodger Summers	
2018	Beautiful Gun	Wade	Short film
2018	Merrymakers of Bedlam	Sam	Short film
TBA	Chasing Midnight	Detective Jackson	post-production

=== Television ===
Year	Title	Role	Notes
1987–1988	Danger Bay	Jeff / Bill	two episodes
1990	My Secret Identity	Grant Bodrosian	episode: "Stolen Melodies"
1990–1993	Neon Rider	Jesse / Dave	three episodes
1991	21 Jump Street	Nick Capelli	one episode
1992	Street Justice	Seth Pierce	episode: "Circle of Death"
1992	The Commish	Don Bellin	episode: "The Frame"
1992	Miles from Nowhere		TV film
1993	Born to Run	Art	TV film
1993	The Substitute	Student (uncredited)	TV film
1993	Other Women's Children	Dr. Gifford	TV film
1994	Highlander	Pete Wilder	episode: "Counterfeit: Part 1"
1994	M.A.N.T.I.S.	Paul Benton / Dog Face	three episodes
1996–1999	Poltergeist: The Legacy	Nick Boyle	87 episodes
1999	The Outer Limits	Jack Burrell / Esterhaus	twp episodes
2000	Level 9	Special Agent David Gaines	episode: "Ten Little Hackers"
2000	T.R.A.X.		TV film
2001	Strange Frequency	Dante	episode: "Disco Inferno"
2001	Dice	Patrick Styvesant	miniseries; six episodes
2001–2002	Dark Angel	Ames White	21 episodes
2002–2004	Smallville	Dr. Lawrence Garner	three episodes
2003	Stargate SG-1	Aden Corso	episode: "Forsaken"
2003	Black Sash	Phillip Rodgers	three episodes
2003	Jake 2.0	Mystery Man	episode: "Last Man Standing"
2004	Andromeda	Kulis Bara	episode: "Exalted Reason, Resplendent Daughter"
2004	Life as We Know It	Coach Dave Scott	four episodes
2004	The Mountain	Eric Toth	four episodes
2005	Killinaskully	Ghost of Christmas Future	episode: "A Christmas Carol"
2005	Reunion	Jake Terrance	two episodes
2005	Murder at the Presidio	Sergeant Barry Atkins	TV film
2005	Painkiller Jane	Sergeant Flynn	TV film
2006	Live Once, Die Twice	Evan Lauker / Luke Ravena / Ken Valeur	TV film
2006	The Collector	Bartett	Eepisode: "The Spy"
2007	The 4400	Gabriel Hewitt	two episodes
2007–2008	Kyle XY	Brian Taylor	14 episodes
2009	Defying Gravity	Dr. Eric Davidson	episode: "Rubicon"
2009	Fear Island	Detective Armory	TV film
2010	Fringe	Joe Falls	episode: "Johari Window"
2010	Smoke Screen	Jay	TV film
2010–2011	Shattered	Det. Terry Rhodes	13 episodes
2011	V	Thomas	six episodes
2011	Sanctuary	Brad Sylvester	episode: "Monsoon"
2011	R.L. Stine's the Haunting Hour	Pete	episode: "Scarecrow"
2011	The Pastor's Wife	Steve Farese Sr.	TV film
2011–2012	Eureka	Dekker	four episodes
2012	True Justice	Thomas Madison (T.M.) Snow	three episodes
2012	Radio Rebel	Rob Adams	TV film
2012	Seattle Superstorm	Jacob Stinson	TV film
2012	Duke	Javier	TV film
2012	The Killing	Corey Peterson	episode: "Ogi Jun"
2013	Mr. Hockey: The Gordie Howe Story	Bill Dineen	TV film
2014	Bates Motel	Peter	two episodes
2014	The Christmas Shepherd	Mark Green	TV film
2014–present	When Calls the Heart	Henry Gowen	103 episodes
2015	The Whispers	President Chip Winters	six episodes
2015–2016	Unreal	Brad	six episodes
2016	A Mother's Suspicion	Gerald	TV film
2016	Not with His Wife	Collin Murphy	TV film
2017	Garage Sale Mysteries	Andrew	episode: "The Art of Murder"
2017	Emma Fielding Mysteries	Tony Markham	
2017–2023	Riverdale	Sheriff Keller	78 episodes
2018	Take Two	Wes McManus	episode: "Stillwater"
2019	Witness to Murder: A Darrow Mystery	Brian Herriman	
2020	Away	Jack Willmore	six episodes
2022	The Song to My Heart	Hank	TV film
2025	Watson	Dr. Moynihan	episode: "Take a Family History"
