= Sands Secondary School =

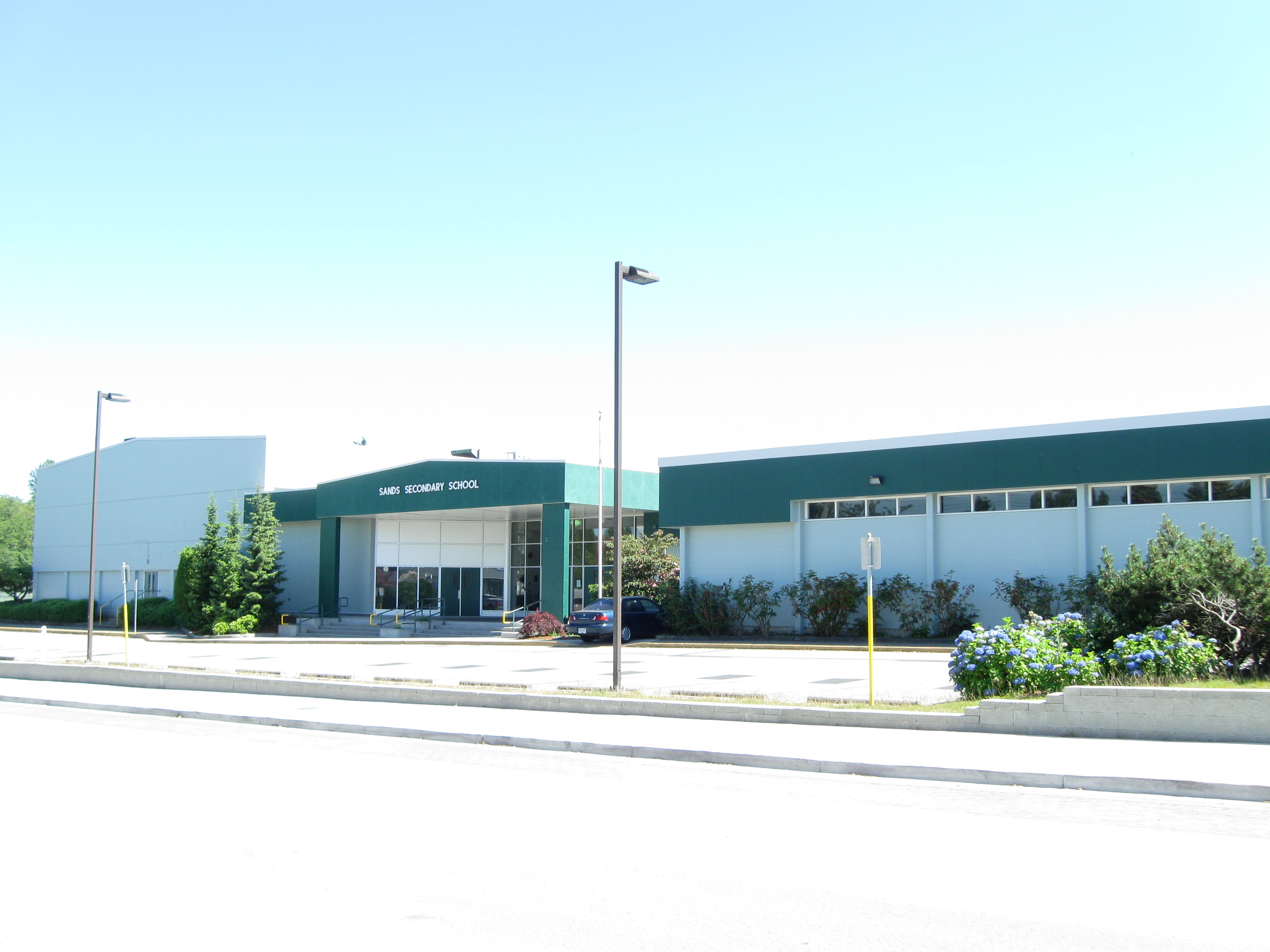

Location
- 10840 82 Avenue; Delta, British Columbia, V4C 2B3; Canada; 49.151650°N 122.922437°W

Information
- School type: Public, High School
- Established: 1974 students attended, 1975 official opening
- School board: School District 37 Delta
- School number: 3737038
- Principal: Ms. Farnden
- Grades: 8-12
- Enrollment: 750
- Education system: Semester
- Language: English
- Area: North Delta
- Colours: Blue and Green
- Mascot: Scorpion ("Hank")
- Team name: Scorpions
- Feeder schools: Brooke Elementary, Gray Elementary
- Website: sa.deltasd.bc.ca
- Last updated: Oct. 24, 2026

Sands Secondary is a public high school in Delta, British Columbia part of School District 37 Delta.

Sands is adjacent to Mackie Park, with Gray Elementary on the other (south) side. Next to Sands there is a forested area with paths, a dog park area, baseball field, grass fields, tennis courts, outdoor basketball hoops, and turf fields.

Some Sands traditions include the Winter assembly with student and staff performances and the whole school singing "The 12 Days of Christmas"; spirit dress up days, with the biggest participation for Formal Day on the last day before winter break; and Grade 12 vs. Staff volleyball and softball.

== History ==
Sands opened it's doors as Sands Junior Secondary to Grades 8 & 9 in September 1974, while parts of the school were still under construction (for practises and games they would walk up the road to NDSS as the gym wasn't completed until February). The official dedication took place in the spring of 1975. Grade 10 was added for the 1975-1976 year. Sands Junior Secondary stayed a Grade 8-10 school, with students moving on to North Delta Senior Secondary for Grades 11-12, until 2004. With the reconfiguration of four high schools in North Delta (Sands, Delview, Burnsview, and North Delta), North Delta changed from three Junior high schools and one Senior high school to four 8-12 high schools. Sands Junior Secondary became Sands Secondary, had the Grade 10s continue into Grade 11 for the 2004-2005 year, and graduated its first Grade 12 class in June 2006. Some renovation was done as part of reconfiguration along with earthquake preparation: A front entrance was added, including a foyer with a Scorpion logo in the floor (designed by student Dylan Bark of Mrs. Dunn's art class), a new courtyard "fishbowl" (which interrupted the front drive-through lane), work on the central science Superlab, parts of outdoor spaces were turned into study halls, and several hallways had their heights opened up so that outside light shines in. Mrs. Thornicroft and Mrs. Barham were Principal and Vice-Principal at the time of reconfiguration.

Sands celebrated its 50th Anniversary on May 3, 2024. There were prizes, food, a photo booth, yearbook poster hallway, karaoke, and grads vs alumni volleyball. Hundreds of student and staff alumni came to visit their old high or junior high.

Some original staff from 1974 came in 2024 to be interviewed by yearbook students about Sands' early days for their 50th special edition: Marion (Chamberlain) McNeill, Ron McNeill, Margaret (Clarke) Bellamy, and Moira Doig.

== Athletics ==
Sands has several sports teams, including junior and senior level Volleyball and Basketball teams. In 2009–2010, the Senior Boys Soccer team won the AAA provincials. In 2011-2012 the Senior Boys Soccer team won the Fraser Valley Championship. In 2007–2008, 2009–2010, Sands won the Fraser Valley Badminton Championships. The Scorpions compete in the Fall Sports of Volleyball, Boys Soccer, Swimming, Cross Country; Winter sports of Basketball, Curling, Gymnastics; and Spring Sports of Ice Hockey, Rugby, Girls Soccer, Ultimate, Badminton, Golf, and Track & Field.

Sands team colours are usually based on the school colours of Navy Blue and Green.

== Theatre Productions ==
Each year the Theatre Program puts on a Spring show. Past productions include Grease, Rent, Into the Woods, Little Mermaid Jr., Addams Family, Emma! A Pop Musical, Anne of Green Gables, Almost, Maine, Footloose. 2027's show is Seussical.

== System ==
In 2021-2022 Sands Secondary switched from a traditional linear system to running on a semester system, which has 4 classes every day from Sept-Jan, and 4 different blocks from Feb-June. There is a "day 1" "day 2" schedule. For example, if Monday is a day 1 then Tuesday would have to be a day 2. Wednesday would go back to a day 1, etc. Each day contains 4 blocks. Day 1 order is blocks A B C D block, while on a day 2 the morning blocks flip and the afternoon blocks flip ie. B A D C. Lunch takes place between 2nd and 3rd block. In semester 2 the blocks are named E F G H.

Sands runs a "Flex" block between 1st and 2nd block. During Flex (technically still course time), students choose which of their 4 classes to attend and work on coursework, get help, or pursue their own learning or passion projects.

Due to the Covid-19 pandemic, for one year in 2020-2021, a quarter system was used, students stayed together in "cohorts", and had only two 2-hour long classes a day.

Classes run from 8:30 - 2:45. Every Wednesday, students have a late start as staff have Collaboration or Prep time, so there is no Flex and first block starts at 9:30 instead. (Due to the extra week of summer in 2026, Wednesday classes start at 9:20 instead for 2026-2027.)
