= List of The New York Times number-one books of 2009 =

The American daily newspaper The New York Times publishes multiple weekly lists ranking the best selling books in the United States. The lists are split into three genres—fiction, nonfiction and children's books. Both the fiction and nonfiction lists are further split into multiple lists.

== Fiction ==
The following list ranks the number-one best selling fiction books, in the hardcover fiction category.

The most popular books of the year were The Lost Symbol, by Dan Brown and The Associate, by John Grisham with respectively 7 and 4 weeks at the top. The author James Patterson was at the top for four different books (8th Confession, Swimsuit, Alex Cross's Trial and I, Alex Cross).

Date	Book	Author
January 4	The Christmas Sweater	Glenn Beck
January 11	Scarpetta	Patricia Cornwell
January 18	Black Ops	W. E. B. Griffin
January 25	Plum Spooky	Janet Evanovich
February 1	Plum Spooky	Janet Evanovich
February 8	Plum Spooky	Janet Evanovich
February 15	The Associate	John Grisham
February 22	The Associate	John Grisham
March 1	The Associate	John Grisham
March 8	The Associate	John Grisham
March 15	Promises in Death	J. D. Robb
March 22	Handle with Care	Jodi Picoult
March 29	Handle with Care	Jodi Picoult
April 5	Handle with Care	Jodi Picoult
April 12	True Detectives	Jonathan Kellerman
April 19	Long Lost	Harlan Coben
April 26	Turn Coat	Jim Butcher
May 3	Just Take My Heart	Mary Higgins Clark
May 10	First Family	David Baldacci
May 17	8th Confession	James Patterson and Maxine Paetro
May 24	Dead and Gone	Charlaine Harris
May 31	Wicked Prey	John Sandford
June 7	Gone Tomorrow	Lee Child
June 14	The Scarecrow	Michael Connelly
June 21	Skin Trade	Laurell K. Hamilton
June 28	Relentless	Dean Koontz
July 5	Knockout	Catherine Coulter
July 12	Finger Lickin' Fifteen	Janet Evanovich
July 19	Swimsuit	James Patterson and Maxine Paetro
July 26	Black Hills	Nora Roberts
August 2	Best Friends Forever	Jennifer Weiner
August 9	The Defector	Daniel Silva
August 16	The Girl Who Played with Fire	Stieg Larsson
August 23	Bad Moon Rising	Sherrilyn Kenyon
August 30	South of Broad	Pat Conroy
September 6	South of Broad	Pat Conroy
September 13	Alex Cross's Trial	James Patterson and Richard DiLallo
September 20	Dark Slayer	Christine Feehan
September 27	The Last Song	Nicholas Sparks
October 4	The Lost Symbol	Dan Brown
October 11	The Lost Symbol	Dan Brown
October 18	The Lost Symbol	Dan Brown
October 25	The Lost Symbol	Dan Brown
November 1	The Lost Symbol	Dan Brown
November 8	The Lost Symbol	Dan Brown
November 15	The Gathering Storm	Robert Jordan and Brandon Sanderson
November 22	Ford County	John Grisham
November 29	Under the Dome	Stephen King
December 6	I, Alex Cross	James Patterson
December 13	I, Alex Cross	James Patterson
December 20	"U" Is for Undertow	Sue Grafton
December 27	The Lost Symbol	Dan Brown

== Nonfiction ==
The following list ranks the number-one best selling nonfiction books, in the hardcover nonfiction category.

Date	Book	Author	Publisher
January 4	Outliers	Malcolm Gladwell	Little Brown
January 11	Outliers	Malcolm Gladwell	Little Brown
January 18	Outliers	Malcolm Gladwell	Little Brown
January 25	Outliers	Malcolm Gladwell	Little Brown
February 1	Outliers	Malcolm Gladwell	Little Brown
February 8	Outliers	Malcolm Gladwell	Little Brown
February 15	Outliers	Malcolm Gladwell	Little Brown
February 22	The Yankee Years	Joe Torre and Tom Verducci	Doubleday
March 1	The Yankee Years	Joe Torre and Tom Verducci	Doubleday
March 8	The Yankee Years	Joe Torre and Tom Verducci	Doubleday
March 15	The Yankee Years	Joe Torre and Tom Verducci	Doubleday
March 22	Outliers	Malcolm Gladwell	Little Brown
March 29	Outliers	Malcolm Gladwell	Little Brown
April 5	Outliers	Malcolm Gladwell	Little Brown
April 12	Liberty and Tyranny	Mark R. Levin	Threshold Editions
April 19	Liberty and Tyranny	Mark R. Levin	Threshold Editions
April 26	Liberty and Tyranny	Mark R. Levin	Threshold Editions
May 3	Liberty and Tyranny	Mark R. Levin	Threshold Editions
May 10	Liberty and Tyranny	Mark R. Levin	Threshold Editions
May 17	Liberty and Tyranny	Mark R. Levin	Threshold Editions
May 24	Liberty and Tyranny	Mark R. Levin	Threshold Editions
May 31	Resilience	Elizabeth Edwards	Broadway
June 7	Liberty and Tyranny	Mark R. Levin	Threshold Editions
June 14	Liberty and Tyranny	Mark R. Levin	Threshold Editions
June 21	Liberty and Tyranny	Mark R. Levin	Threshold Editions
June 28	Liberty and Tyranny	Mark R. Levin	Threshold Editions
July 5	Liberty and Tyranny	Mark R. Levin	Threshold Editions
July 12	Catastrophe	Dick Morris and Eileen McGann	Harper/HarperCollins
July 19	Catastrophe	Dick Morris and Eileen McGann	Harper/HarperCollins
July 26	Outliers	Malcolm Gladwell	Little Brown
August 2	Unmasked	Ian Halperin	Simon Spotlight Entertainment
August 9	Outliers	Malcolm Gladwell	Little Brown
August 16	Culture of Corruption	Michelle Malkin	Regnery
August 23	Culture of Corruption	Michelle Malkin	Regnery
August 30	Culture of Corruption	Michelle Malkin	Regnery
September 6	Culture of Corruption	Michelle Malkin	Regnery
September 13	Culture of Corruption	Michelle Malkin	Regnery
September 20	Culture of Corruption	Michelle Malkin	Regnery
September 27	Official Book Club Selection	Kathy Griffin	Ballantine
October 4	True Compass	Edward M. Kennedy	Twelve
October 11	Arguing with Idiots	Glenn Beck, Kevin Balfe, and others	Mercury Radio Arts/Threshold Editions
October 18	Have a Little Faith	Mitch Albom	Hyperion
October 25	Have a Little Faith	Mitch Albom	Hyperion
November 1	Have a Little Faith	Mitch Albom	Hyperion
November 8	Have a Little Faith	Mitch Albom	Hyperion
November 15	The Book of Basketball	Bill Simmons	Ballantine
November 22	Have a Little Faith	Mitch Albom	Hyperion
November 29	Open	Andre Agassi	Knopf
December 6	Going Rogue	Sarah Palin	Harper/HarperCollins
December 13	Going Rogue	Sarah Palin	Harper/HarperCollins
December 20	Going Rogue	Sarah Palin	Harper/HarperCollins
December 27	Going Rogue	Sarah Palin	Harper/HarperCollins

== See also ==
- Publishers Weekly list of bestselling novels in the United States in the 2000s
