= Aaron Klein (disambiguation) =

Aaron Klein (born 1979) is a radio host and writer.

Aaron Klein may also refer to:

- Aaron E. Klein (1930–1998), science writer
- Aaron Klein, character in Where Are You Now?
- Aaron J. Klein (1960–2016), Israel-based American author and journalist
- Aaron Klein (born 1978), CEO at Riskalyze, former Sierra College Trustee, and co-founder of Hope Takes Root
