= A Stranger Is Watching =

A Stranger Is Watching may refer to:

- A Stranger Is Watching (novel), a 1977 novel by Mary Higgins Clark
- A Stranger Is Watching (film), a 1982 American thriller film, based on the novel
