= List of The New York Times number-one books of 1999 =

The American daily newspaper The New York Times publishes multiple weekly lists ranking the best selling books in the United States.

== Fiction ==
The following list ranks the number-one best selling fiction books, in the hardcover fiction category.

Date	Book	Author
January 3	A Man in Full	Tom Wolfe
January 10	A Man in Full	Tom Wolfe
January 17	A Man in Full	Tom Wolfe
January 24	A Man in Full	Tom Wolfe
January 31	Southern Cross	Patricia Cornwell
February 7	Southern Cross	Patricia Cornwell
February 14	Southern Cross	Patricia Cornwell
February 21	The Testament	John Grisham
February 28	The Testament	John Grisham
March 7	The Testament	John Grisham
March 14	The Testament	John Grisham
March 21	The Testament	John Grisham
March 28	The Testament	John Grisham
April 4	The Testament	John Grisham
April 11	The Testament	John Grisham
April 18	The Testament	John Grisham
April 25	Bittersweet	Danielle Steel
May 2	The Girl Who Loved Tom Gordon	Stephen King
May 9	We'll Meet Again	Mary Higgins Clark
May 16	We'll Meet Again	Mary Higgins Clark
May 23	Star Wars Episode I: The Phantom Menace	Terry Brooks
May 30	Star Wars Episode I: The Phantom Menace	Terry Brooks
June 6	Star Wars Episode I: The Phantom Menace	Terry Brooks
June 13	Star Wars Episode I: The Phantom Menace	Terry Brooks
June 20	Harry Potter and the Chamber of Secrets	J. K. Rowling
June 27	Hannibal	Thomas Harris
July 4	Hannibal	Thomas Harris
July 11	Hannibal	Thomas Harris
July 18	Hannibal	Thomas Harris
July 25	Hannibal	Thomas Harris
August 1	Hannibal	Thomas Harris
August 8	Hannibal	Thomas Harris
August 15	Harry Potter and the Philosopher's Stone	J. K. Rowling
August 22	Black Notice	Patricia Cornwell
August 29	Black Notice	Patricia Cornwell
September 5	Black Notice	Patricia Cornwell
September 12	Harry Potter and the Philosopher's Stone	J. K. Rowling
September 19	The Alibi	Sandra Brown
September 26	Harry Potter and the Prisoner of Azkaban	J. K. Rowling
October 3	Harry Potter and the Prisoner of Azkaban	J. K. Rowling
October 10	Harry Potter and the Prisoner of Azkaban	J. K. Rowling
October 17	Harry Potter and the Prisoner of Azkaban	J. K. Rowling
October 24	Harry Potter and the Prisoner of Azkaban	J. K. Rowling
October 31	Harry Potter and the Prisoner of Azkaban	J. K. Rowling
November 7	Harry Potter and the Prisoner of Azkaban	J. K. Rowling
November 14	Harry Potter and the Prisoner of Azkaban	J. K. Rowling
November 21	Harry Potter and the Prisoner of Azkaban	J. K. Rowling
November 28	Harry Potter and the Prisoner of Azkaban	J. K. Rowling
December 5	Harry Potter and the Chamber of Secrets	J. K. Rowling
December 12	Harry Potter and the Chamber of Secrets	J. K. Rowling
December 19	Harry Potter and the Chamber of Secrets	J. K. Rowling
December 26	Harry Potter and the Chamber of Secrets	J. K. Rowling

== Nonfiction ==
The following list ranks the number-one best selling nonfiction books, in the hardcover nonfiction category.

Date	Book	Author
January 3	The Greatest Generation	Tom Brokaw
January 10	The Greatest Generation	Tom Brokaw
January 17	The Greatest Generation	Tom Brokaw
January 24	The Greatest Generation	Tom Brokaw
January 31	The Greatest Generation	Tom Brokaw
February 7	The Greatest Generation	Tom Brokaw
February 14	The Greatest Generation	Tom Brokaw
February 21	The Greatest Generation	Tom Brokaw
February 28	The Greatest Generation	Tom Brokaw
March 7	The Greatest Generation	Tom Brokaw
March 14	The Greatest Generation	Tom Brokaw
March 21	Monica's Story	Andrew Morton
March 28	All Too Human	George Stephanopoulos
April 4	All Too Human	George Stephanopoulos
April 11	All Too Human	George Stephanopoulos
April 18	All Too Human	George Stephanopoulos
April 25	All Too Human	George Stephanopoulos
May 2	The Greatest Generation	Tom Brokaw
May 9	The Greatest Generation	Tom Brokaw
May 16	The Greatest Generation	Tom Brokaw
May 23	The Greatest Generation	Tom Brokaw
May 30	The Greatest Generation	Tom Brokaw
June 6	Every Man a Tiger	Tom Clancy with Chuck Horner
June 13	The Greatest Generation	Tom Brokaw
June 20	The Greatest Generation	Tom Brokaw
June 27	The Greatest Generation	Tom Brokaw
July 4	The Greatest Generation	Tom Brokaw
July 11	Shadow	Bob Woodward
July 18	Shadow	Bob Woodward
July 25	Shadow	Bob Woodward
August 1	Shadow	Bob Woodward
August 8	Shadow	Bob Woodward
August 15	Tuesdays with Morrie	Mitch Albom
August 22	Tuesdays with Morrie	Mitch Albom
August 29	Tuesdays with Morrie	Mitch Albom
September 5	Tuesdays with Morrie	Mitch Albom
September 12	Tuesdays with Morrie	Mitch Albom
September 19	Tuesdays with Morrie	Mitch Albom
September 26	Tuesdays with Morrie	Mitch Albom
October 3	Tuesdays with Morrie	Mitch Albom
October 10	'Tis	Frank McCourt
October 17	'Tis	Frank McCourt
October 24	'Tis	Frank McCourt
October 31	'Tis	Frank McCourt
November 7	'Tis	Frank McCourt
November 14	'Tis	Frank McCourt
November 21	'Tis	Frank McCourt
November 28	'Tis	Frank McCourt
December 5	Have a Nice Day!	Mick Foley
December 12	Tuesdays with Morrie	Mitch Albom
December 19	Tuesdays with Morrie	Mitch Albom
December 26	Tuesdays with Morrie	Mitch Albom

== See also ==
- Publishers Weekly list of bestselling novels in the United States in the 1990s
