= A Cry in the Night (novel) =

1982 novel by Mary Higgins Clark

- First edition
- Author: Mary Higgins Clark
- Language: English
- Genre: Mystery
- Publisher: Simon & Schuster
- Publication date: September 1982
- Publication place: United States
- Media type: Print (hardback & paperback)
- ISBN: 0-671-43128-5
- OCLC: 8552071
- Dewey Decimal: 813/.54 19
- LC Class: PS3553.L287 C76 1982

A Cry in the Night (1982) is a suspense novel by American author Mary Higgins Clark.

== Synopsis ==
Jenny MacPartland, a divorced single mother, falls in love with artist Erich Kreuger while working for a New York gallery. They marry within a month and set up home on Erich's vast Minnesota ranch. For several months they are happily married, but Jenny begins to feel uneasy around her increasingly unstable husband. Within a year, their marriage is ripped apart by scandal and Jenny plans to return to New York City until she realizes that she is pregnant and completely dependent financially on Erich. Unsure of what to do, Jenny lives in fear and hides her growing baby from her husband as long as she physically can.

As Jenny's pregnancy progresses, she discovers Erich's obsession with his dead mother, Caroline—the exact image of Jenny. Jenny begins to realize who she is married to and worrying about his child which she is carrying. Soon after he finds out she is planning to leave him, he starts to stalk her. He leaves without her on a trip and takes her two children. In an attempt to find out the truth about his plans, Jenny explores his past...

== Characters in A Cry in the Night ==
- Jenny MacPartland – a divorced single mother, protagonist
- Erich Krueger – a painter whom Jenny marries in the course of the story
- Caroline Bonardi – Enrich’s Mother
- Kevin MacPartland – Jenny's lazy ex-husband; an actor
- Beth MacPartland – Jenny's first daughter
- Tina MacPartland – Jenny's second daughter
- Joe – Erich's working hand on the farm
- Elsa – Erich's maid
- Mark – A doctor and the only man Jenny feels comfortable with
- Rooney Toomis – Jenny's friend and Caroline's old friend
- Clyde – Rooney Husband

== Adaptations ==
A Cry in the Night was made into a television movie in 1992 starring Carol Higgins Clark and Perry King.
