= We'll Meet Again (novel) =

1999 American novel

- Author: Mary Higgins Clark
- Language: English
- Genre: Mystery
- Publisher: Simon & Schuster
- Publication place: United States
- Media type: Print (hardback, paperback), ebook, audiobook
- Pages: 320 pages
- ISBN: 0-684-83597-5 First edition hardback (US)
- Preceded by: You Belong to Me
- Followed by: The Night Awakens

We'll Meet Again is a 1999 mystery novel by American novelist Mary Higgins Clark. It was published by Simon & Schuster and spent multiple weeks on the New York Times' Bestseller lists for its hardback and paperback editions. A made for TV film was released in 2002, starring Laura Leighton and Brandy Ledford.

== Synopsis ==
Socialite Molly Lasch is married to Gary, a prominent physician and founder of the Remington Health Management HMO. She's horrified to learn that he has been cheating on her with one of his nurses, even having a child with her. When he's discovered murdered, his head bashed in by a statue and Molly standing over his body, the police assume that she is the culprit. Claiming to have no memory of the events and that she is innocent, Molly agrees to plead guilty to manslaughter rather than face trial over murder charges. She gains early parole and once out, begins to once again proclaim her innocence. Among the reporters is her old college friend Fran, who Molly contacts in hopes that she can help her case. During the course of their investigation the two discover evidence that points towards the true killer being someone else, including evidence that Gary was involved in unsavory dealings. When the mistress is found dead in a parking lot the police immediately suspect Molly, as the two had recently spoken.

== Release ==
We'll Meet Again was first published in hardback in the United States on April 26, 1999 through Simon & Schuster. An audiobook adaptation read by Jan Maxwell was released on the same day in audiocassette and CD formats, also through Simon & Schuster. The novel was released in paperback format the following year.

Since its publication the novel has been released in multiple countries and given translations into languages such as Spanish, Polish, and Italian.

=== Sales ===
Copies of We'll Meet Again sold well and the novel placed on the New York Times' Bestsellers List. It held the number one spot for hardcover fiction for the weeks of May 9 and 16, 1999, dropping to second after the release of the Star Wars: Episode I – The Phantom Menace novelization. The paperback edition of the novel also held the number one place for mass-market paperbacks for the weeks of May 7 and 21, 2000.

== Film adaptation ==
On November 11, 2002 PAX TV aired a made for TV adaptation of We'll Meet Again, directed by Michael Storey. The film starred Laura Leighton and Brandy Ledford as Fran and Molly, respectively. Gedeon Burkhard, Andrew Jackson, and Anne Openshaw also starred in the movie.

== Reception ==
Critical reception for We'll Meet Again was generally favorable. Reviewers for the Star Tribune and Wisconsin State Journal both praised the novel, with the former stating that while the novel is formulaic it "works" as "What's wrong with a formula? Certain tactics become formulas because they work every time." A reviewer for the Associated Press was more critical, as they felt that the novel was "hodgepodge, and not very interesting or well-written."
