= Mary Jane Clark =

American novelist

Mary Jane Clark (born 1954; Mary Jane Elizabeth Behrends) is an American author of two series of suspense novels. Her first twelve books are media thrillers influenced by her three decades of experience in broadcast journalism. She plots murder mysteries investigated and solved by the characters who work at KEY News, the fictional television news world she has created. Her next series is The Wedding Cake Mysteries, featuring an actress-turned wedding cake designer who gets involved in murder cases which threaten to prevent ceremonies.

== Early life ==
The daughter of a special agent with the FBI who uncovered Russian espionage during the Cold War and, later, worked on kidnapping and extortion cases, her interest in suspense started at an early age. She attended Immaculate Heart Academy in Washington Township, Bergen County, New Jersey, graduating in 1972. With the goal of working in television news, she graduated from the University of Rhode Island with degrees in journalism and political science.

She started her professional career as a desk assistant at CBS News headquarters in New York City, eventually becoming a producer and writer.

== Present ==
Clark resides in Hillsdale, New Jersey and Florida. She has two children, a daughter, Elizabeth, an actress, and a son, David who has Fragile X Syndrome, the most common inherited form of developmental disability. Mary Jane supports the FRAXA Research Foundation, a non-profit organization that supports scientific research aimed at finding a treatment or a cure for the condition.

Clark's former mother-in-law and sister-in-law are the well-known American authors Mary and Carol Higgins Clark, respectively.

== Books ==
Key News

- 1998 Do You Want to Know a Secret
- 1999 Do You Promise Not to Tell
- 2000 Let Me Whisper in Your Ear
- 2001 Close To You
- 2002 Nobody Knows
- 2003 Nowhere to Run
- 2004 Hide Yourself Away
- 2005 Dancing in the Dark
- 2006 Lights Out Tonight
- 2007 When Day Breaks
- 2008 It Only Takes a Moment
- 2009 Dying for Mercy

Wedding Cake Mysteries

- 2011 To Have and To Kill
- 2012 The Look of Love
- 2013 Footprints in the Sand
- 2014 That Old Black Magic
