= RAMJAC =

Fictional multinational conglomerate

- First appearance: 1979
- Created by: Kurt Vonnegut
- Owner: Mary Kathleen O'Looney (bequeathed to the people of the United States upon her death)
- Key people: Jack Graham
- Subsidiaries: (see list)

The RAMJAC Corporation is a fictional multinational conglomerate, or megacorp, featured in several novels by Kurt Vonnegut. In Vonnegut's 1979 novel, Jailbird, the company, at its height, owns 19 percent of the United States, twice as large as the next largest conglomerate in the "Free World". Copyrights on Vonnegut's later books are also held by RAMJAC, much like Isaac Asimov's later copyrights are held by Nightfall, Inc.

According to Jailbird, RAMJAC was established by Jack Graham, a mining engineer from West Virginia, and then passed on to his widow, known to the world as Mrs. Jack Graham (in "reality", the former Mary Kathleen O'Looney, the ex-lover of the book's narrator, Walter F. Starbuck). Mrs. Graham ordered her surrogates to "acquire, acquire, acquire", instructions which eventually produced the conglomerate's vast holdings. Two years after her death (her will being concealed by Starbuck for that time), it was discovered that she had transferred ownership of RAMJAC to the "people of the United States", as part of a misguided attempt to bring about widespread state ownership – Mrs. Graham had been a Communist since college. The U.S. government immediately began selling off RAMJAC's assets.

== "Divisions and holdings" of The RAMJAC Corporation ==
RAMJAC is said to have vast holdings in other businesses, including both real companies and media products along with fictional elements:

- All in the Family
- American Harp Company
- Anheuser-Busch
- AT&T
- Barnum and Bailey Circus
- Bergdorf Goodman
- Bloomingdale's
- Chrysler Air Temp
- The Plain Dealer
- Colonel Sanders
- Diamond Match Company
- Down Home Records
- Dell Publishing
- Gulf+Western
- Henri Bendel
- Hospitality Associates, Ltd., including the Arapahoe Hotel and the Hilton Department
- The Illinois Institute of Instruction
- Manufacturers Hanover Trust Company
- Marlborough Gallery
- McDonald's
- The New York Times
- Peanuts comic strip
- Pinkerton Detective Agency
- Playboy magazine
- Plymouth Cordage Company
- Ringling Brothers Circus
- The Rosewater Foundation
- Sesame Street
- Sloane's department store
- Tiffany's department store
- Transico
- Kilgore Trout and Sons
- Universal Pictures
- Lawrence Welk
- Who's Who
- Youngstown Steel

== See also ==
- Acme Corporation – fictional company in Warner Bros. cartoons
- Weyland-Yutani – fictional megacorporation from the Alien film franchise
- Yoyodyne – fictional company featured in Thomas Pynchon's novels
