= No Place Like Home (novel) =

2005 thriller novel by Mary Higgins Clark

- First edition
- Author: Mary Higgins Clark
- Language: English
- Genre: Thriller, mystery
- Publisher: Simon & Schuster
- Publication date: April 2005
- Publication place: United States
- Media type: Print (hardback & paperback)
- Pages: 368 pp
- ISBN: 0-7434-9728-7
- OCLC: 65190581

No Place Like Home is a 2005 thriller novel written by American author Mary Higgins Clark.

== Plot summary ==
The story starts with 10-year-old Liza Barton accidentally shooting and killing her mother and shooting and injuring her stepfather Ted. She is acquitted of the crime and is later adopted by some distant relatives.

Twenty-four years later, the story picks up with Liza determined to bury her past. She has changed her name to Celia Foster and married Alex Nolan after her first husband Larry's death. Alex, not aware of Celia's past, gifts her with a surprise birthday present—the keys to her own parents' home in a neighboring town Mendham. Alex, Celia and her 4-year-old son, Jack, move into the home to find that it has been vandalized. Unsure of how Alex would react to her past, Celia decides to hide it from him for some more time.

Flashes of the night her mom died come back to Celia as she sets out to find out more about what really happened that night. She discreetly tries to find information about her father's accident that led to his death a year before her mother's death. One by one, a few of the older residents of the town are murdered and some of the evidence leads to Celia being suspected. Celia finds her own life in danger, as the pursuit of the murderer's identity picks up pace.

== Critical reception ==
Msnbc.com described the novel as a "suspenseful murder mystery". New York Times writer Marilyn Stasio said that the novel "taps into the tensions that go along with the joys of moving into a new home".
