= The Adventures of Buckaroo Banzai Across the 8th Dimension =

1984 American science fiction film by W. D. Richter

- Theatrical release poster
- Directed by: W. D. Richter
- Written by: Earl Mac Rauch
- Produced by: W. D. Richter; Neil Canton
- Starring: Peter Weller; John Lithgow; Ellen Barkin; Jeff Goldblum; Christopher Lloyd
- Cinematography: Fred J. Koenekamp
- Edited by: George Bowers; Richard Marks
- Music by: Michael Boddicker
- Production company: Sherwood Productions
- Distributed by: 20th Century Fox
- Release date: August 10, 1984
- Running time: 102 minutes
- Country: United States
- Language: English
- Budget: $17 million
- Box office: $6.3 million

The Adventures of Buckaroo Banzai Across the 8th Dimension, often shortened to Buckaroo Banzai, is a 1984 American adventure science fiction comedy film produced and directed by W. D. Richter and written by Earl Mac Rauch. It stars Peter Weller in the title role, with Ellen Barkin, John Lithgow, Jeff Goldblum, and Christopher Lloyd. The supporting cast includes Lewis Smith, Rosalind Cash, Clancy Brown, Pepe Serna, Robert Ito, Vincent Schiavelli, Dan Hedaya, Matt Clark, Bill Henderson, Jonathan Banks, Carl Lumbly and Ronald Lacey.

The film centers upon the efforts of the polymath Dr. Buckaroo Banzai, a physicist, neurosurgeon, test pilot, and rock star, to save the world by defeating a band of inter-dimensional aliens called Red Lectroids from Planet 10. The film is a cross between the action-adventure and science fiction film genres and also includes elements of comedy and romance.

After screenwriter W. D. Richter hired novelist Earl Mac Rauch to develop a screenplay of Mac Rauch's new character, Buckaroo Banzai, Richter teamed with producer Neil Canton to pitch the script to MGM/UA studio chief David Begelman, who took it to 20th Century Fox to make the film. Box office figures were low and less than half of the film's production costs were recovered. Some critics were put off by the complicated plot, although Pauline Kael enjoyed the film and Vincent Canby called it "pure, nutty fun." Buckaroo Banzai has been adapted for books, comics, and a video game and has attracted a loyal cult following.

== Plot ==
Buckaroo Banzai and his mentor Dr. Tohichi Hikita perfect the "oscillation overthruster", a device that allows an object to pass through solid matter. Banzai tests it by driving his Jet Car through a mountain. While in transit, he finds himself in another dimension. After exiting the mountain and returning to his normal dimension, he discovers an alien organism has attached itself to his car.

Dr. Emilio Lizardo, incarcerated at the Trenton Home for the Criminally Insane, sees a television news story of Banzai's successful test. In 1938, Drs. Lizardo and Hikita had built a prototype overthruster in Princeton, New Jersey, but he tested it before it was ready and became stuck between dimensions. In those moments, he saw alien creatures and struggled until freed by his colleagues, emerging crazily changed and violent. Understanding that Banzai has finally accessed the 8th dimension, Lizardo escapes the asylum and plots to steal the overthruster.

Banzai and his band, "The Hong Kong Cavaliers", are performing at a nightclub when Banzai interrupts their musical intro to speak to a sad woman in the audience, Penny Priddy. During a song he performs especially for her ("Since I Don't Have You"), she attempts to shoot herself, which is mistaken for an assassination attempt on Banzai. After questioning her at the New Brunswick jail, he realizes she is his late wife Peggy's long-lost identical twin sister and bails her out.

Later, during a press conference to discuss his Jet Car experience, the overthruster, and the specimen of alien/transdimensional life he obtained while traversing the 8th dimension, Banzai is called to the phone, where he receives an electrical shock. Simultaneously, strange men disrupt the event and kidnap Hikita. When Banzai returns, his electrical shock enables him to recognize them as humanoid aliens, and he gives chase. He rescues Hikita, and they evade the aliens long enough for the Cavaliers to rescue them.

Banzai and the Cavaliers return to the Banzai Institute, where they are met by John Parker, a messenger from John Emdall, the leader of the peaceful Black Lectroids of Planet 10. Parker delivers a recording from Emdall in which she explains that her people have been at war with the hostile Red Lectroids for years, managing to banish them to the 8th dimension. Lizardo's failed test of the overthruster in 1938 allowed the Red Lectroids' tyrannical leader, Lord John Whorfin, to take over Lizardo's mind and enable several dozen of his allies to escape. Because Banzai has now perfected the overthruster, Emdall fears Whorfin and his allies will try to acquire it to free the other Red Lectroids and tasks Banzai with stopping Whorfin; otherwise, the Black Lectroids will attack Russia from their orbiting ship, triggering a nuclear World War III that will annihilate the Red Lectroids on Earth as well as humankind.

The Cavaliers track the Red Lectroids to Yoyodyne Propulsion Systems in New Jersey. They realize that Orson Welles's broadcast of The War of the Worlds described the Lectroids' arrival in Grovers Mill, New Jersey in 1938, though afterward the Lectroids forced him to state it was fictional. Yoyodyne has been building a spacecraft to cross over to the 8th dimension, disguised as a new United States Air Force bomber. While the Cavaliers plan their response, Red Lectroids break into the Institute and kidnap Penny, unaware that they have also captured the overthruster, which she was carrying.

At Yoyodyne, Penny refuses to tell the Red Lectroids where the overthruster is, and they begin torturing her. Banzai enters Yoyodyne headquarters alone; the Cavaliers soon follow, reinforced by several groups of the Blue Blaze Irregulars—civilians recruited to assist the Cavaliers. Banzai saves Penny and fights off the Red Lectroids, though she is wounded and unconscious. While the Cavaliers tend to her, Banzai and Parker sneak into a pod on the Yoyodyne spacecraft. Lacking Banzai's overthruster, Whorfin insists they use his imperfect model, which fails to make the dimensional transition; instead, the Red Lectroid spaceship breaks through the Yoyodyne wall and takes off into the atmosphere.

Lord Whorfin ejects the pod containing Banzai and Parker from the craft, but they activate it and use its weapon systems to destroy Whorfin and the other Red Lectroids. Banzai parachutes back to Earth while Parker returns to his people in orbit using the pod. With the situation resolved and war averted, Banzai finds Penny, who appears to have died from her injuries. When he gives her a farewell kiss, Emdall allows Banzai one more brief moment of electricity, reviving Penny.

== Cast ==
- Peter Weller as Dr. Buckaroo Banzai
- John Lithgow as Dr. Emilio Lizardo / Lord John Whorfin
- Ellen Barkin as Penny Priddy / Peggy Banzai
- Jeff Goldblum as Dr. Sidney Zweibel / "New Jersey"
- Christopher Lloyd as John Bigbooté
- Lewis Smith as "Perfect Tommy"
- Rosalind Cash as John Emdall
- Robert Ito as Professor Tohichi Hikita
- Pepe Serna as Reno Nevada
- Michael Santoro as Billy Travers
- Ronald Lacey as President Widmark
- Matt Clark as Secretary of Defense John McKinley
- Clancy Brown as "Rawhide"
- William Traylor as General Catburd
- Carl Lumbly as John Parker
- Vincent Schiavelli as John O'Connor
- Dan Hedaya as John Gomez
- Mariclare Costello as Senator Margaret Cunningham
- Bill Henderson as Casper Lindley
- Damon Hines as Scooter Lindley
- Billy Vera as "Pinky" Carruthers
- Laura Harrington as Mrs. Eunice Johnson
- Yakov Smirnoff as National Security Advisor Smirnoff
- Jonathan Banks as Lizardo Hospital Guard

== Production ==
=== Development ===
In 1974, W.D. Richter's wife read a review of Dirty Pictures from the Prom, the debut novel from Dartmouth College graduate and writer Earl Mac Rauch, and recommended it to her husband. Richter, also an alumnus from the college, read the book, loved it, and wrote Mac Rauch a letter. The two men began corresponding. When the writer told him about his interest in becoming a screenwriter, Richter offered him an open-ended invitation to visit him in Los Angeles where he was attending the University of Southern California and working as a script analyst for Warner Bros.

=== Screenplay ===
Years passed and Richter became a successful screenwriter. Mac Rauch took Richter up on his offer and arrived in L.A. Richter proceeded to introduce the writer to producer/director Irwin Winkler, who gave Mac Rauch rent money for the next six months. Over several dinners, Mac Rauch told Richter and his wife of a character named Buckaroo Bandy about whom he was thinking of writing a screenplay. Richter and his wife liked the idea and paid Mac Rauch $1,500 to develop and write it. According to Mac Rauch, his script was inspired by "all those out-and-out, press-the-accelerator-to-the-floor, non-stop kung fu movies of the early '70s". Richter remembers that Mac Rauch wrote several stories about this character, then he "would get thirty or forty pages into a script, abandon its storyline and write a new one". Mac Rauch recalled, "It's so easy to start something and then—since you're really not as serious about it as you should be—end up writing half of it ... You shove the hundred pages in a drawer and try to forget about it. Over the years, I started a dozen Buckaroo scripts that ended that way".

Mac Rauch's original 30-page treatment was titled Find the Jetcar, Said the President - A Buckaroo Banzai Thriller. Early on, one of the revisions Mac Rauch made was changing Buckaroo's surname from Bandy to Banzai. Mac Rauch was not happy with the name change, but Richter convinced him to keep the new name. The Hong Kong Cavaliers also appeared in these early drafts, but, according to Richter, "it never really went to a completed script. Mac wrote and wrote but never wrote the end". Another early draft was titled The Strange Case of Mr. Cigars about a huge robot and a box of Adolf Hitler's cigars. Mac Rauch shelved his work for a few years while he wrote New York, New York for Martin Scorsese and other unproduced screenplays.

In 1980, Richter talked with producers Frank Marshall and Neil Canton about filming one of his screenplays. Out of this meeting, Canton and Richter formed their own production company and decided that Buckaroo Banzai would be the first film. Under their supervision, Mac Rauch wrote a 60-page treatment titled Lepers from Saturn. They shopped Mac Rauch's treatment around to production executives who were their peers, proposing that Richter direct it, but no one wanted to take on such unusual subject matter by two first-time producers and a first-time director. Canton and Richter contacted veteran producer Sidney Beckerman at MGM/UA, with whom Canton had worked before. Beckerman liked the treatment and introduced Richter and Canton to studio chief David Begelman. Within 24 hours, they had a development deal with the studio. It took Mac Rauch a year and a half to write the final screenplay; during this time, the Lepers from the treatment became Lizards and then Lectroids—from Planet 10. Much of the film's detailed character histories were taken from Mac Rauch's unfinished Banzai scripts.

The 1981 Writers Guild of America strike forced the project to languish in development for more than a year. Begelman left MGM as several of his projects had performed poorly at the box office; this put all of his future projects, Buckaroo Banzai included, in jeopardy. Begelman formed Sherwood Productions and exercised a buy-out option with MGM for the Banzai script. He took it to 20th Century Fox who agreed to make it with a $12 million budget. Mac Rauch ended up writing three more drafts before they had a shooting script.

=== Casting ===
When considering the role of Buckaroo Banzai, Richter wanted an actor who "could both look heroic with grease all over his face, and project the kind of intelligence you would associate with a neurosurgeon and inventor". The studio wanted a recognizable film star, but Richter and Canton wanted to cast a relatively unknown actor. Richter looked in New York City because he assumed that an actor with experience on stage and small films "would be able to completely interact with props". He had been impressed by Peter Weller's performance in Shoot the Moon and met with him. At first, the actor was hesitant to take the role because he was unclear on the overall tone of the film. "Would it be campy? Would it be a cartoon? Or would it be the sort of wacky, realistic film that would catch people sideways—and not be a cartoon", Weller remembers thinking. Richter told Banzai's story to Weller and convinced him to do the film. The actor stated that he based his character on Elia Kazan, Jacques Cousteau, Albert Einstein, Leonardo da Vinci, and Adam Ant.

For the role of Dr. Emilio Lizardo, the studio wanted to cast an unknown actor, but Mac Rauch had written the role with John Lithgow in mind. Like Weller, Lithgow was not sure about the character, but Richter convinced him by "claiming what a real feast for an actor this wonderful Jekyll and Hyde character was", Lithgow later said. He told an interviewer, "I have had roles where I came very close to going over the top. In Twilight Zone [in "Nightmare at 20,000 Feet"], I almost went over the top several times. But this role is completely over the top. It makes the role in Twilight Zone seem like a model of restraint. I do it in a wild, red fright wig and rotten false teeth with a thick Italian accent. It's wild." For Lizardo's accent, Lithgow spent time with an Italian tailor at MGM and recorded his voice (film credit to "Roberto Terminelli: John Lithgow's dialect coach"). Lithgow changed his walk to that of an "old crab, because my alien metabolism is supposed to be messed up". He said of his character, "playing Lizardo felt like playing the madman in The Cabinet of Dr. Caligari."

Ellen Barkin, who played the romantic interest "Penny Priddy", describes the film as "if Terry Southern had written Star Wars. None of the characters are quite what they should be—just my kind of thing." Richter's only choice to play John Bigbooté was Christopher Lloyd, who agreed to the role. Richter first met Jeff Goldblum on Invasion of the Body Snatchers and wanted him to play the character New Jersey; the actor admired the script and was eager to work with the cast the director had assembled. Lewis Smith was asked to dye his hair blond; it took eight hours, and he saw it go from red to orange to fluorescent yellow to white. Clancy Brown said that his character is "very common sensical. He's the everyman of the film". Robert Ito was so determined to get the role of Dr. Hikita that he disguised himself as an old man, designing his own make-up job to age himself thirty years.

=== Pre-production ===
Getting the right look for the characters was an important part of the filmmaking and led costume designer Aggie Guerard Rodgers to raid LA stores looking for appropriate outfits. From left: New Jersey (Goldblum), Billy Travers (Santoro), Rawhide (Brown), Buckaroo (Weller), Reno (Serna), Pinky Carruthers (Vera) and Perfect Tommy (Smith).

Production designer J. Michael Riva had worked with Richter before and spent two years working on the look for Banzai. He and Richter studied many kinds of art and literature for the film's look, including medical journals, African magazines, and Russian history. They did not want metal spaceships and opted for a more organic look like a deep sea oyster shell. Gregory Jein, Inc. and Stetson Visual Concepts built the spaceship models and worked off sketches by production illustrator Tom Cranham and used seashells as guides. Richter purposely wanted the film to have an unpolished look because the "real world appears ramshackle—because people constantly repair whatever's around them".

The inspiration for the look of the Red Lectroids came from Riva sporting a lobster on his nose. He wanted to base their alien form on Canadian-American paleontologist Dale Russell's "dinosauroid", an upright-posture dinosaur (based on what dinosaurs might have evolved into if they had survived), but modified the concept because it would have required prosthetics that would have immobilized the actors. Their makeup ultimately consisted of 12 separate pieces of latex appliances per alien. Each actor's makeup was unique, with casts taken of their faces. Riva consulted Russian history, as he wanted to give them a "baggy-suited, Moscow bureaucrat sort of image", yet influenced by contemporary Russian lifestyles; they went with greens, blues and yellows because, according to Riva, they are "sick and anemic."

Costume designer Aggie Guerard Rodgers, who designed costumes for Return of the Jedi, American Graffiti and The Conversation, met Richter while working on Invasion of the Body Snatchers. Riva noted that "She fell right into step with the stuff I was designing for the sets," making the costumes match the color of the rooms. Richter wanted the Black Lectroids to have a "warrior-like demeanor, but in an elegant, not fierce fashion"; their costumes came from African tribal markings. For Buckaroo's and his Cavaliers' look, Rodgers gathered Gianni Versace, Perry Ellis, and Giorgio Armani sports jackets, suits, and ties; the clothing was mostly found in LA area stores. Rogers noted "We also wanted to have something a little off so that there's a kick to everything to make it unique. Rick changed something on every outfit" and that "It's an interesting style, not a cliche style. You throw stuff in there that people will recognize." Goldblum's character Dr. Zweibel was given a cowboy outfit from Nudie Cohn's Rodeo Tailors to wear; according to costumer Radford Polinski, the character thought he was dressed appropriately for an audition for a person named "Buckaroo".

=== Principal photography ===
By the time of filming, Richter had compiled a 300-page book called The Essential Buckaroo that consisted of notes and every incomplete script Mac Rauch had written over the years. These included various references to a villain named Hanoi Xan, leader of the World Crime League. Begelman was adamant that all references to Xan be removed. This included the removal of the original opening, which showed Buckaroo's father being killed by Xan and featuring Jamie Lee Curtis as Buckaroo's mother.

Principal photography had begun during the second week of September 1983 on locations in and around South Gate, an industrial suburb of L.A. Buckaroo's neurosurgery scene with New Jersey was shot at the Lakeview Medical Center in the San Fernando Valley. The jet car sequences were shot in October on a dry lake north of the San Bernardino Mountains. The vehicle was designed by Riva and art director Stephen Dane, and built by Thrust Racing owners Jerry Segal and George Hedebeck. Segal started with a Ford F-350 truck, reinforced the frame assembly, added the front end from a Grand National stock car, borrowed air scoops from a DC-3, and a one-man cockpit modeled after a Messerschmitt fighter plane. Under the hood, Segal modified the Ford engine with an oversized carburetor and nitrous oxide injectors. Northrop University loaned the production a working GE turbojet engine. The oscillation overthruster was created by Riva and visual effects supervisor Michael Fink out of a gyroscope to which a metal frame, wires, circuits, and tiny strobe lights were added.

Cinematographer Jordan Cronenweth was initially hired as the film's director of photography but, halfway through production, producers replaced him with Fred J. Koenekamp. Several scenes shot by Cronenweth, including the iconic nightclub scene, are included in the final cut, though Cronenweth goes uncredited.

The Banzai Institute exteriors were shot in Rustic Canyon, Los Angeles, with the interiors filmed in an Art Deco house designed in 1931 by MGM art director Cedric Gibbons for his wife, Dolores del Río. Deserted rooms at Brentwood's V.A. hospital were used for Dr. Lizardo's room at the Trenton Home for the Criminally Insane. Lizardo's 1938 laboratory was filmed at a deserted industrial site, Alpha Tubing. The set decorators rented a collection of 1930s electrical props originally used in the original Boris Karloff Frankenstein films. The interiors of Yoyodyne Propulsion Systems were shot in the abandoned Firestone tire factory. Wilmington's Department of Water and Power provided the location for Dr. Lizardo's shock tower and served as the Yoyodyne exterior, while the Armco Steel Plant in Torrance housed the Lectroid launch hangar. Weller remembers that during the scene where his character is tortured by Dr. Lizardo, "I was laughing at the banter between [Christopher] Lloyd and [John] Lithgow ... I never laughed so hard in my life! They had to stop takes over and over on that segment." Finally, 12 weeks of filming was done on the backlot and soundstages at MGM.

Begelman continually interfered with production through the initial stages of shooting, demanding changes and sending notes. The director later described him as "our enemy for the entire movie." By the end of filming, these demands had disappeared. The crew became convinced that Begelman had "checked out", and to test their theory, added a now-famous scene in which the presence of a watermelon becomes a topic for a short discussion. When the scene was allowed into the movie without comment, they concluded that management was indeed ignoring them, and they had free rein to put in whatever they wanted.

Begelman eventually made one more major change after seeing that the movie ended with a kiss and demanded something more. By this time, the budget was almost completely spent and postproduction nearly complete. Richter decided to have the end credits appear over a new scene that was shot in the style of a music video, hiring a choreographer to arrange the action over new music by Michael Boddicker. The song was not ready in time, so the crew filmed it while playing Billy Joel's Uptown Girl. Richter described the scene as having "kind of emerged from the end of the postproduction." The scene was shot with the actors walking in the LA River bed in front of the Sepulveda Dam. The scene, called "gleefully bizarre", opens with the only remaining reference to the Hanoi Xan storyline when it mentions a (never produced) sequel called "Buckaroo Banzai against the World Crime League."

=== Soundtrack ===
The film's music coordinator and sound designer Bones Howe began working with musician Michael Boddicker on the film's theme music and sound effects, as they had worked together on the soundtrack for Get Crazy. Boddicker was Howe's first choice to write and perform the film's score. Boddicker had just won a Grammy Award for his song "Imagination" on the Flashdance soundtrack. In addition to composing the score, Boddicker also produced the alien sound effects, while Alan Howarth was hired to create the sounds of the 8th Dimension.

Howe selected the source music for the club scene and put together a special arrangement of "Since I Don't Have You" that Buckaroo sings to Penny Priddy. Weller, an accomplished musician, played the guitar and pocket trumpet, did his own vocals, and learned to mime piano playing. Howe and the filmmakers decided not to go with a rock music score for the film and opted for an electronic one instead. Howe wanted to "integrate music and sound effects so that everything would merge on the soundtrack with no distinction between music and sound."

== Reception ==
=== Release ===
Fox hired Terry Erdmann and a team of publicists including Blake Mitchell and Jim Ferguson to promote the film at Star Trek conventions with a few film clips and free Banzai headbands, which have since become highly sought-after collector's items by fans of the film. The studio made no attempts to sell the film to a mainstream audience with traditional promotion, although there were some magazine advertisements (primarily in Marvel Comics) and related licensing which served as viral advertising in limited venues. Studio publicist Rosemary LaSalmandra said, "Nobody knew what to do with Buckaroo Banzai. There was no simple way to tell anyone what it was about—I'm not sure anybody knew". Lithgow said, "I've tried to explain the story line to people and it takes about an hour. I mean it; it's that complicated. But it's terrific. Every time I tell people about it, I get so excited that I end it by saying, Buckaroo Banzai, remember where you heard it first!"

Buckaroo Banzai was originally scheduled to be released on June 8, 1984, but was pushed back to August 10. It opened on 236 screens and faced stiff competition against the likes of Star Trek III: The Search for Spock (also featuring Banzai co-star Christopher Lloyd), Indiana Jones and the Temple of Doom, and Ghostbusters. It made US$620,279 on its opening weekend before finally grossing $6.2 million in North America, earning back less than half of its production costs.

=== Critical response ===
Although reportedly "dismissed by many critics as 'strange' and 'unintelligible'" at the time of its release, the film received positive reviews from 67% of 45 surveyed critics on Rotten Tomatoes. The critical consensus on Rotten Tomatoes reads, "Sci-fi parodies like these usually struggle to work, but Buckaroo Banzai succeeds through total devotion to its own lunacy." Bill Cosford of The Miami Herald praised it as "an unusual film": "Its comedy springs from that odd combination of self-effacement and self-absorption [...] [It] is basically a comic strip, relentlessly hip [...] an adventure in the Buck Rogers mold." Dave Kehr, in the Chicago Reader, wrote, "Richter seems to have invented an elaborate mythology for his hero [...] but he never bothers to explicate it; the film gives you the mildly annoying sensation of being left out of a not very good private joke". Danny Peary's 1986 Guide for the Film Fanatic described Buckaroo Banzai as a "scatterbrained, sloppily made science-fiction comedy for the stoned-out generation [...] a surprising failure when hip audiences were turned off by [the] conceited attempt by filmmakers and actors to show off how hip they were." In his review for The New York Times, Vincent Canby wrote that Buckaroo Banzai "may well turn out to be a pilot film for other theatrical features, though this one would be hard to top for pure, nutty fun". Richard Corliss, for Time, wrote, "its creators, Earl Mac Rauch and W.D. Richter, propel their film with such pace and farfetched style that anyone without PhDs in astrophysics and pop culture is likely to get lost in the ganglion of story strands. One wonders if the movie is too ambitious, facetious and hip for its own box-office good". The New Yorker, film critic Pauline Kael wrote, "I didn't find it hard to accept the uninflected, deadpan tone, and to enjoy Buckaroo Banzai for its inventiveness and the gags that bounce off other adventure movies, other comedies. The picture's sense of fun carried me along".

Danny Bowes, writing a retrospective in 2011 for Tor.com, said that the film "is paradoxically decades ahead of its time and yet completely of its time; it's profoundly a movie by, for, and of geeks and nerds at a time before geek/nerd culture was mainstreamed, and a movie whose pre-CG special effects and pre-Computer Age production design were an essential part of its good-natured enthusiasm. What at the time was a hip, modern take on classic SF is now [...] almost indistinguishable from the SF cinema that inspired it in terms of the appeal to modern viewers: the charmingly old-fashioned special effects, and the comparatively innocent earnestness of its tone."

=== Home media ===
Buckaroo Banzai was first released for home media on LaserDisc, VHS, and Betamax in 1985 by Vestron Video, in 1990 by Video Treasures, and in 2001 by MGM Home Entertainment. The film was released on DVD on January 4, 2002, by MGM Home Entertainment. Entertainment Weekly gave the DVD release a "B+" rating and wrote, "Fans will drool over the extras, including some illuminating deleted scenes (of particular note is an alternate opening detailing Buckaroo's tragic childhood, featuring Jamie Lee Curtis as Banzai's mother) and director Richter's commentary, which reveals some colorful behind-the-scenes battles with studio execs." IGN gave the DVD their highest rating and was "thrilled by the special edition treatment that this landmark cult film has received at the hands of MGM. The video is great, the sound is great, there are tons of extras". For the Blu-ray format, the film was featured as part of Shout! Factory's Shout! Select Blu-ray line in August 2016; the Shout! Factory release contains a two-hour retrospective documentary featuring interviews with Weller, Lithgow, Brown, Serna, Smith, Vera, Lloyd, and director W.D. Richter, among others. A Blu-ray was also released in the United Kingdom by Arrow Video in 2015.

== Legacy ==
Buckaroo Banzai has since attracted a loyal cult following and has been popular on home video. Richter said, "It has had the most dramatic reactions of anything I've worked on. Some loathe it and others are willing to die for it". The director feels that the film failed commercially because the narrative was too complex; he would have liked to have had more coverage for certain scenes and felt he could have edited the film better, as there were too many master shots and two-shots that left little for the editor to work with.

Wired Magazine, in 2009, celebrated "the 25th anniversary of the release of a film near and dear to many geeks who came of age in the '80s. The Adventures of Buckaroo Banzai Across the 8th Dimension was a great, adventurous, geeky movie, with enough silly science fiction and great characters to fill any three lousy summer blockbusters these days ... and it gave us so many great, geeky lines to quote." Bill Cosford, in his 1984 Miami Herald review, had foreseen the dialogue's popularity: "I suspect that Buckaroo's odd musings, particularly the one about being there no matter where you go, are about to enter the popular argot on the scale of "Where's the beef?" Entertainment Weekly ranked Buckaroo Banzai as No. 43 in their Top 50 Cult Movies. The film was ranked No. 21 on the magazine's "The Cult 25: The Essential Left-Field Movie Hits Since '83" list. The Guardian has also cited Buckaroo Banzai as one of their "1,000 films to see before you die".

== Other media ==
=== Books ===
The film was novelized by creator Earl Mac Rauch in 1984. The book, entitled Buckaroo Banzai, was published by Pocket Books and released in conjunction with the film, then reprinted in 2002 to coincide with the release of the film on DVD. Like the film, the novel teases future installments. The second book in the series, The Adventures of Buckaroo Banzai Against the World Crime League, et al: A Compendium of Evils, also by Mac Rauch, was published by Dark Horse in November 2021. Both novels are written in the first person point of view from the Hong Kong Cavaliers character Reno's perspective in a "nonfiction" style, relating the plots as if accounts of true events.

=== Comics ===
Also in conjunction with the film's 1984 release, Marvel Comics published a comic book adaptation by writer Bill Mantlo and artists Mark Texeira in Marvel Super Special No. 33. The adaptation was also released as a two-issue limited series.

Moonstone Books began publishing comic books in 2006 depicting earlier and further adventures of Buckaroo Banzai and the Hong Kong Cavaliers. The first story, Buckaroo Banzai: Return of the Screw, was written by creator Earl Mac Rauch. The black-and-white preview edition of the comic was released in February 2006, featuring a behind-the-scenes article by Dan Berger regarding the transformation of the rejected Buckaroo Banzai television pilot script Supersize those Fries into the present comic book limited series. The three issues of this comic have been collected into a trade paperback. In December 2007, Moonstone released a new Banzai comic story "A Christmas Corrall" in the Moonstone Holiday Super Spectacular compilation, also written by Mac Rauch and drawn by Ken Wolak. A two-issue prequel to the film was released in early 2008 called Of Hunan Bondage. It was written by Mac Rauch with art by Superman Returns storyboard artist Chewie. Moonstone released Big Size in early 2009, a special oversize one-shot comic written by Mac Rauch with art by Paul Hanley.

=== Video game ===
In conjunction with the film's 1984 release, the interactive fiction game The Adventures of Buckaroo Banzai: Across the 8th Dimension was released for the Apple II, Atari 8-bit computers, Commodore 64, Commodore 16, Plus/4, IBM PC compatibles, TI-99/4A, and ZX Spectrum by Adventure International.

=== Television series ===
In late 1998, the Fox Network announced development of a Buckaroo Banzai TV series titled Buckaroo Banzai: Ancient Secrets and New Mysteries. It was never released. The special edition DVD contains a short computer-animated sequence by Foundation Imaging made as a test reel for the series. The clip depicts a Space Shuttle trying to land with broken landing gear; Dr. Banzai maneuvers his Jet Car under the Shuttle and uses it to take the place of the broken gear.

In May 2016, Kevin Smith announced he would be adapting the film for television through MGM Television. Amazon Studios indicated a deal was being negotiated to produce the series. However, by November, during a Facebook Live Stream, Smith revealed that he would be walking away from the project after MGM filed a lawsuit against the original creators.

=== Other references ===
The film has been seen in other media.

- Yoyodyne had earlier been featured as the name of an aerospace company in two 1960s novels by Thomas Pynchon.
- The 1987 instructional book The Hitchhikers Guide to the Internet made frequent use of "Yoyodyne" in its examples of corporate URLs, and Yoyodyne Propulsion Systems had an office on the promenade of Star Trek's Deep Space Nine.
- The current incarnation of the comic strip Dick Tracy has seen two subtle references to the film in the storyline: In a strip dated October 22, 2013, there is a reference to a business named "Emilio Lizardo Crematorium" and in a strip dated November 7, 2013, Dick Tracy's granddaughter Honeymoon tells him she will be attending a Hong Kong Cavaliers concert with the hope of getting Perfect Tommy's autograph.
- The PhD thesis of Eric Weinstein was called Extension of Self-Dual Yang-Mills Equations Across the Eighth Dimension.
- The triumphant ending of the movie with Banzai and an ever-growing group of friends walking together was copied for the ending of Wes Anderson's 2004 film The Life Aquatic with Steve Zissou (Jeff Goldblum appears in both scenes).
- Parzival, the main character of the 2018 film Ready Player One, appears in a Buckaroo Banzai costume for a date. Aech says to Parzival, "You're going to wear the outfit from your favorite movie." His date Art3mis responds to his costume with, "I like Buckaroo Banzai!"

== See also ==
- List of cult films
