= Yoyodyne =

Fictional aerospace company

- First appearance: 1963
- Created by: Thomas Pynchon
- Location: San Narciso, California
- Owner: Clayton "Bloody" Chiclitz
- Purpose: Aerospace industry

Yoyodyne is a fictional company featured in Thomas Pynchon's novels, most prominently in The Crying of Lot 49, and humorously referenced in various other media.

== Background ==
Yoyodyne was first introduced as a fictional defense contractor in Pynchon's debut novel V. (1963) and featured prominently in his novella The Crying of Lot 49 (1966). Described in the latter book as "a giant of the aerospace industry," Yoyodyne was founded by World War II veteran Clayton "Bloody" Chiclitz. The company has a large manufacturing plant in the fictional town of San Narciso, California. The name is reminiscent of several real high-tech companies, including the Gyrodyne Company of America, Teledyne and Teradyne, all of which were founded a few years before Pynchon wrote The Crying of Lot 49, and Rocketdyne, an aerospace company that manufactured, among other things, propulsion systems.

The name comes from "yoyo", a repetitive motion, and "dyne", a unit of force. According to Gyu Han Kang, it "symbolizes the destructive force of sameness and artificially structured order".

Joseph W. Slade suggests that Yoyodyne was based on Pynchon's time working for Boeing.

== Reception and analysis ==
Ralph Clare notes that Yoyodyne is typical of companies depicted by Pynchon that "appear rather banal, represented not primarily by management and corporate hatchet men but by frustrated salaried employees in their natural cubicle-habitat". It is further noted that although "there has been no physical violence perpetrated by Yoyodyne against its workers or the community", the company "dispossesses people nonetheless" through "entitlement to its workers' patents", thereby turning the process of inventorship from one of creativity to another form of assembly-line drudgery.

Demonstrating how Pynchon uses Yoyodyne as an example of stifling innovation, Cyrus Patell writes: "The corporations that employ these inventors stress the value of 'team-work,' but for [Stanley] Koteks 'teamwork' is nothing but 'a way to avoid responsibility ... a symptom of the gutlessness of the whole society'" He also notes, "Yoyodyne follows the prototypical evolutionary pattern of a business within a culture of corporate capitalism: begun by an individual entrepreneur, it soon grows into a large entrenched bureaucracy that is hostile to individual initiative and inventiveness".

Slade explains that the company is an example of a contradiction in values Pynchon presents in The Crying of Lot 49: "Yoyodyne ... manufactures destructive high-tech weapons but markets them in classical capitalist fashion, as if they were ordinary industrial products".

== Legacy and influence ==
=== In fiction ===
Yoyodyne has frequently been referenced as an "in-joke" in other media. For example:

- The 1984 film The Adventures of Buckaroo Banzai Across the 8th Dimension used the name Yoyodyne Propulsion Systems for a defense contractor whose corporate offices feature the sign, "The future begins tomorrow". Yoyodyne is a front for a group of Red Lectroid aliens, all with the first name John, that landed in Grovers Mill, New Jersey in 1938, using the panic created by Orson Welles' War of the Worlds radio play as cover.
- Numerous references in the Star Trek series, such as control panels and dedication plaques, indicate that parts of Federation starships were manufactured by Yoyodyne Propulsion Systems or YPS. Often, these notices are too small to be visible on a television screen, or can only be observed by freeze-framing.
- Yoyodyne is a client of the law firm Wolfram & Hart on the television series Angel at the beginning in the 9th episode of the 5th season titled "Harm's Way".
- The central bus station on the television series The John Larroquette Show was constructed by Yoyodyne.

=== In technical disciplines ===
In June 1991 version 2 of the open-source license GNU General Public License used the fictional company name "Yoyodyne, Inc." as an example grantor of the license.

=== Real-world companies named Yoyodyne ===
Yoyodyne was an Internet-based direct marketer, founded by Seth Godin and later joined by Mark Hurst, and acquired by Yahoo! on October 12, 1998. Godin took the name from the company in The Adventures of Buckaroo Banzai Across the 8th Dimension.

A company named Yoyodyne LLC, based in Morristown, New Jersey, is a retailer of aftermarket motorcycle parts, including self-branded clutch accessories.

== See also ==
- Acme Corporation – fictional company in Warner Bros. cartoons
- RAMJAC - fictional conglomerate in the works of Kurt Vonnegut
- Weyland-Yutani – fictional megacorporation from the Alien film franchise
