= We'll Meet Again (2002 film) =

- Based on: We'll Meet Again by Mary Higgins Clark
- Written by: Michael Thoma and John Benjamin Martin
- Directed by: Michael Storey
- Starring: Laura Leighton; Brandy Ledford; Gedeon Burkhard; Andrew Jackson; Anne Openshaw
- Country of origin: United States
- Original language: English

Production
- Producer: Stephen Arnott
- Cinematography: Henry M. Lebo
- Editor: Jana Fritsch
- Running time: 95 minutes

Original release
- Network: PAX TV
- Release: November 11, 2002

We'll Meet Again is a 2002 film, based on the 1999 novel by Mary Higgins Clark.

== Plot ==
Socialite Molly Lasch is released from prison after serving a six-year sentence for the murder of her husband, Dr. Gary Lasch. Now with the help of Fran, an investigative reporter, Molly sets out to prove her innocence. Together they uncover a conspiracy of silence at the Lasch Medical Center and a shocking secret that could cost both women their lives.

== Cast ==
- Laura Leighton as Fran Silman
- Brandy Ledford as Molly Lasch
- Gedeon Burkhard as Dr. Peter Gaynes
- Andrew Jackson as Nick Whitehall
- Anne Openshaw as Jenna Whitehall
