= Earl Mac Rauch =

American novelist and screenwriter

- Born: United States
- Education: Dartmouth College
- Occupation: Writer

Earl Mac Rauch is an American novelist and screenwriter.

Rauch is best known for writing the screenplays for A Stranger Is Watching; New York, New York and The Adventures of Buckaroo Banzai Across the 8th Dimension.

== Bibliography ==
- Dirty Pictures from the Prom (1969)
- Arkansas Adios (1971)
- New York, New York (1977)
- Buckaroo Banzai (novelisation) (1984)
- Buckaroo Banzai Against the World Crime League, et al: A Compendium of Evils (2021)

== Filmography ==
- New York, New York (1977) (with Mardik Martin)
- A Stranger Is Watching (1982) (with Victor Miller)
- The Adventures of Buckaroo Banzai Across the 8th Dimension (1984) (writer)
- Wired (1989) (writer)
