= Remember Me (Clark novel) =

1994 novel by Mary Higgins Clark

- First edition
- Author: Mary Higgins Clark
- Cover artist: Paul Bacon
- Language: English
- Genre: Suspense
- Published: 1994
- Publisher: Simon & Schuster
- Publication place: United States
- Media type: Print (hardback & paperback), Online
- Pages: 496 pp (Hardcover)
- ISBN: 978-0-671-89468-9
- Preceded by: I'll Be Seeing You
- Followed by: The Lottery Winner

Remember Me is a 1994 suspense novel by American author Mary Higgins Clark.

== Synopsis ==
After losing her young son Bobby in a tragic accident, bereaved mother Menley Nichols finds her relationship with husband Adam, a high-profile criminal attorney, steadily falling apart. However, the birth of their second child, Hannah, promises to save their marriage, and the three of them start a new life in a rented house on Cape Cod.

But as Menley will soon learn, things are never that simple. For at her new home, the aptly named Remember House, strange incidents force her into reliving the terrible night she lost her son, and she soon fears for the safety of her new daughter. Meanwhile, Adam takes on a client suspected of drowning his wife, and the two scenarios soon collide and result in a dramatic final confrontation on a rainswept beach for the Nicholses.

== Reception ==
The novel was a critical and commercial success, topping The New York Times bestseller lists and garnering positive reviews.

- "Clark takes the reader on a mysterious and suspenseful ride, twisting plot after plot... A fascinating climax..." - Tam Gordon, Nashville Banner
- "A grippingly readable thriller... Mary Higgins Clark does wonders." - Les Roberts, The Plain Dealer
- "Remember Me pulls it off brilliantly, harkening back to the best of Daphne Du Maurier." - Susan Toepfer, People
- "In "Remember Me", Mary Higgins Clark returns to Cape Cod, the scene of her first novel "Where Are the Children"... Her enduring theme - children in peril - is one she does well." - Elaine Budd, Hartford Courant

== Television adaptation ==
A television adaptation of the novel directed by Michael Switzer and starring Kelly McGillis was broadcast on CBS on November 19, 1995.
