= I Heard That Song Before =

- First edition (publ. Simon & Schuster)
- Author: Mary Higgins Clark
- Language: English
- Publisher: Simon & Schuster
- Publication date: 2007
- Dewey Decimal: 813.54
- LC Class: PS3553.L287 I15

I Heard That Song Before is a 2007 suspense novel by American author Mary Higgins Clark.

== Synopsis ==
The daughter of a landscaper for the wealthy Carrington family, six-year-old Kay Lansing sneaks away from her father's side one morning, and overhears a woman blackmailing a man for money. When she tells him that this will be the last time, he caustically responds: "I heard that song before". That same night teenager Susan Althrop, eldest son Peter Carrington‘s girlfriend, vanishes into thin air and is never seen again. Twenty-two years later, Peter, forty-two, now runs the family empire and has been widowed; his pregnant wife drowned in their swimming pool eight years ago. As fate would have it, Kay falls in love with Peter after she approaches him about hosting a literary luncheon, and the two promptly marry. However, his peculiar nocturnal habits soon set her teeth on edge, especially when he's unconsciously drawn to the place where the former Mrs. Carrington met her end...

== Reception ==
The novel was a critical and commercial success.
