= Family Passions =

Canadian-German television serial

- Also known as: Macht der Leidenschaft
- Written by: Bruce Neckels; Thom Racina
- Directed by: Jørn Winther
- Starring: Andrew Jackson
- Countries of origin: Germany; Canada
- Original languages: German; English
- No. of seasons: 1

Production
- Production locations: Hamburg, Germany Canada

Original release
- Network: Baton Broadcasting System; ZDF
- Release: September 1993

Family Passions (German: Macht der Leidenschaft) is the first hour-long television serial produced in Canada and Germany. It was produced and distributed by Baton Broadcasting System and ZDF between 1993 and 1994. In 1996, BBS stations replayed the entire series in a half-hour format.

== Storylines ==
To assist with bringing in a German audience, the show went on location to Hamburg when a jewel thief and his lover (who had been in a coma for seven years and wanted revenge on the woman her husband had married in the meantime) stole the Dimarco diamond from a museum in that country.

Another milestone of this show was the exploration of a lesbian couple attempting to adopt a daughter whose biological mother was deemed unfit because of her addiction to cocaine. Their attempts were thwarted when the child's biological father (who had been working as their butler) intervened. This couple also frequently shared on screen kisses. When the ABC Daytime serial All My Children did this ten years later, it made international news.

Family Passions featured popular soap actors such as Kin Shriner, Roscoe Born, Andrew Jackson and Gordon Thomson as well as many Canadian actors including future The Walking Dead actress Laurie Holden, future Star Wars actor Hayden Christensen, Barry Flatman, Jennifer Dale, Jason Cadieux, Susan Hogan and Von Flores. Also German actors such as Dietmar Schönherr, Raphael Wilczek, Adelheid Arndt and Tina Ruland made an appearance on the show.

== Main crew ==
- Jørn Winther
- Bruce Neckels
- Thom Racina
- Jack McAdam
- Alfie Kemp
