= Where Are You Now? (novel) =

2008 novel by Mary Higgins Clark

- First edition
- Author: Mary Higgins Clark
- Language: English
- Genre: Mystery
- Publisher: Simon & Schuster
- Publication date: April 2008
- Publication place: United States
- Media type: Print (Hardback & paperback)
- ISBN: 978-1-4165-6638-0
- OCLC: 166373538

Where Are You Now? is a 2008 suspense novel by American author Mary Higgins Clark.

The novel was ranked number 102 of the 250 most borrowed books from UK libraries in 2008 and 2009.

== Synopsis ==
Ten years ago, 21-year-old Charles MacKenzie, Jr. ("Mack") walked out of his apartment without a word and has never been seen again. He does, however, call his mother annually on Mother's Day to assure her of his health and safety, then hangs up, leaving her frantic questions unanswered. Even his father's death in the 9/11 attacks didn't bring him home or break the pattern of his calls. Now, Carolyn MacKenzie has decided the only way to move on with her own life is to find closure and bring an end to the mystery of her brother's disappearance. This year when Mack makes his regular Mother's Day call, she declares her intention to track him down, no matter what. The following day, Monsignor Devon Mackenzie receives a scrap note reading: Uncle Devon, tell Carolyn she must not look for me. Despite the disapproval and angry reactions of loved ones, Carolyn persists in a search that plunges her into a world of unexpected danger and winding questions.
