= Andrew Jackson (actor) =

Canadian actor

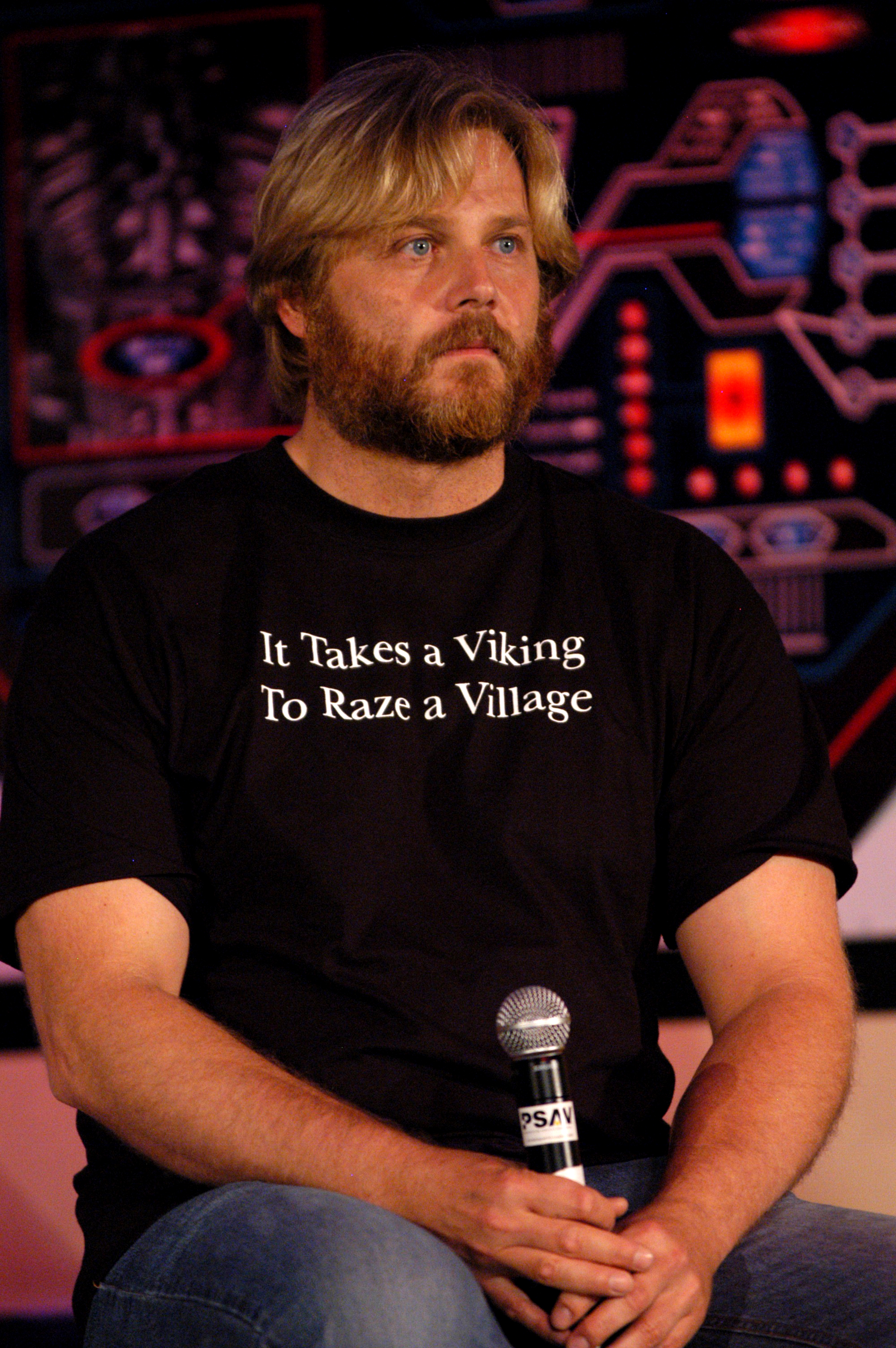
- Jackson in 2005
- Born: Ontario, Canada
- Occupation: Actor
- Years active: 1987–present

Andrew Jackson is a Canadian actor known for his roles in television, film, anime, and video games.

== Early life ==
Jackson was born in Newmarket, Ontario. His mother was a high school music teacher and his father served in the Canadian Armed Forces.

== Career ==
Jackson has played major roles in various television shows and movies, including Merlin's Apprentice, All My Children, Family Passions, Wind at My Back (season 2 as David Doyle, the Dynamite Kid in "The Champ") (season 5 as Vanaver Mainwaring, Grace Bailey's husband), Held Up, Criminal Minds, Deadly Betrayal, Kyle XY, Twists of Terror and Sea Wolf. He also provided the English dub voices of Lark in Devil Kings, Rubanoid, Plitheon, Sabator and Phosphos in Bakugan: Gundalian Invaders, Dylan, Wolfurio, Zenthon, Zenthon Titan, Slycerak, Spatterix and Balista in Bakugan: Mechtanium Surge, as well as the voice of Doji in Beyblade: Metal Fusion, as his predecessor Juan Chioran, voiced Doji in the first 32 episodes, and Rago in Beyblade Metal Fury.

== Filmography ==
=== Film ===
Year	Title	Role	Notes
1988	State Park	Corky	
1990	Red Blooded American Girl	Donald	
1996	Specimen	Sixty-Six	
1997	Pippi Longstocking	Romeo / Classical Stage Actor	
1998	Shadow Builder	Shadowbuilder	
1999	Held Up	Billy (SWAT Team Leader)	
2002	Try Seventeen	Guy	
2004	Scooby-Doo 2: Monsters Unleashed	Man in Car	
2005	Edison	Ives	
2006	Seed	Dr. Parker Wickson	
2013	Breakout	Lapin	
2016	The Apostle Peter: Redemption	Processus	
2016	Total Frat Movie	Captain Vickers	
2016	East End	Capo Mission / Speedo / Secret Service Officer	
2018	Robbery	The Pit Boss	
2019	The River You Step In	Gabe	
2023	Christmas in Maple Hills	Jim Warrick	

=== Television ===
Year	Title	Role	Notes
1987	Alfred Hitchcock Presents	Parks	Episode: "The Initiation"
1989	The Comedy of Errors	Balthazar	Television film
1990	Friday the 13th: The Series	General Lafayette	Episode: "The Charnel Pit"
1991	Top Cops	Michael Carew	Episode: "Dennis Pardini/Larry Robinson/Michael Carew"
1991	Peeping Tom	Mr. Battering Ram	Television film
1991–1993	All My Children	Dr. Stephen Hamill	213 episodes
1993	Highlander	Pallin Wolf	Episode: "The Darkness"
1993–1994	Family Passions	Jön Futing	29 episodes
1994	Bermuda Grace	Raymond Mitchell	Television film
1994	Sirens	Chris Joworski	2 episodes
1995	Lonesome Dove: The Series	Acton	Episode: "Rebellion"
1995	Due South	Hogan	Episode: "North"
1995	Ultraforce	Prime	3 episodes
1996	Road to Avonlea	Goliath	Episode: "Davey and the Mermaid"
1996	F/X: The Series	Blade	Episode: "Eye of the Dragon"
1996–1997	Psi Factor	Frank Kelterbourne	2 episodes
1997	Breach of Faith: A Family of Cops II	Boris Kalichoff	Television film
1997	Beast Wars: Transformers	Various characters	2 episodes
1997	Twists of Terror	Barry	Television film
1997	Joe Torre: Curveballs Along the Way	Paul O'Neill	Television film
1997	Fast Track	Tucker Ricks	Episode: "Kennedy Gets a Ride"
1997	Wind at My Back	David "The Dynamite Kid" Doyle	Episode: "The Champ"
1998	The Last Don II	Dirk Von Schelburg	2 episodes
1998	Blackjack	Don Tragle	Television film
1998	Arliss	Luc Cassoulet	Episode: "The Family Trust"
1998	Universal Soldier II: Brothers in Arms	Sgt. Andrew Scott / GR13	Television film
1998	Highlander: The Raven	Darryl Keenan	Episode: "Crime and Punishment"
1999	Charmed	Nicholas	Episode: "That '70s Episode"
1999	Amazon	Colonel Miller	Episode: "Fallen Angels"
1999	Millennium Man	Jake Adaman / Adam / Adam II	Television film
1999	Cover Me	Kevin	6 episodes
1999–2002	Earth: Final Conflict	The First Jaridian	4 episodes
2000	Catch a Falling Star	Ryan Steele	Television film
2000	Big Wolf on Campus	Boris Federov	Episode: "Commie Dawkins"
2000	Beggars and Choosers	Richard Ellis	Episode: "Fifty Three Percent Solution"
2000	Stargate SG-1	Supreme High Councillor Per'sus	Episode: "Divide and Conquer"
2000	First Wave	Davis	Episode: "Legacy"
2000–2001	Wind at My Back	Vanaver Mainwairing/James F. Marshall III	7 episodes
2001	Los Luchadores	Gniknod	Episode: "Confrontation in the Constellation"
2001	Prince Shotoku	Hata	Television film
2002	Brother's Keeper	Adam Ruane	Television film
2002	Scared Silent	Officer John McCrane	Television film
2002	Smallville	Ray Wallace	Episode: "Duplicity"
2002	We'll Meet Again	Nick Whitehall	Television film
2002	Taken	Buddy Parker	Episode: "High Hopes"
2003	Cold Squad	Jeff Hawkins	Episode: "Bob & Carol & Len & Ali"
2003	Deadly Betrayal	Adam Hamilton	Television film
2003	Doc	Danny Taylor	Television film
2003	Tarzan	Jonathan Clayton	Episode: "Pilot"
2003–2004	Sue Thomas: F.B.Eye	Kevin Duffman	2 episodes
2003–2004	Andromeda	Lipp-Sett	2 episodes
2004	The Book of Ruth	Elton	Television film
2004	Life as We Know It	Walter Bradford	3 episodes
2004	Category 6: Day of Destruction	Walt Ashley	Television film
2004–2006	The Collector	Danny Hullstrom	6 episodes
2005	Criminal Minds	Tim Vogel	Episode: "Extreme Aggressor"
2005	Terminal City	Tomas Bukowski	3 episodes
2005	Glass	Morgan	3 episodes
2006	The Evidence	Oliver Beckman	Episode: "Five Little Indians"
2006	Kyle XY	Cyrus Reynolds	3 episodes
2006	Hank Williams First Nation	David Wright	Episode: "Duelling Hotties"
2006	Merlin's Apprentice	Master Burton	2 episodes
2007	The Dead Zone	Doug O'Connell	Episode: "Ambush"
2007	Di-Gata Defenders	Von Faustien	Episode: "Von Faustien"
2008	XIII: The Conspiracy	Roger Deakins	2 episodes
2009	Being Erica	Marcus Stahl	2 episodes
2009	The Amazing Spiez!	Macho Man	Episode: "Operation Solo Spy"
2009	Sea Wolf	Johnson	2 episodes
2009–2013	Beyblade: Metal Fusion	Doji / Rago / Anton	30 episodes
2010–2011	Skatoony	Xcquankly / Finwoe	5 episodes
2010–2011	Bakugan Battle Brawlers	Spatterix / Dylan / Wolfurio	53 episodes
2011	King	T-Bone	Episode: "T-Bone"
2011	Breakout Kings	Kellen Stackhouse	Episode: "Steaks"
2011	Razzberry Jazzberry Jam	Various roles	3 episodes
2011	Against the Wall	Jerry Riggs	Episode: "A Good Cop"
2011	Warehouse 13	Jackson	Episode: "The 40th Floor"
2011	Covert Affairs	Petr	Episode: "Letter Never Sent"
2012	Lost Girl	Jed	Episode: "School's Out"
2012	Nikita	Chairman	Episode: "Power"
2012	Hatfields & McCoys	Icelandic Photographer / Gunman	Episode #1.3
2012	Pegasus Vs. Chimera	Cyros	Television film
2012	Copper	Junius Brutus Booth	2 episodes
2013	Beyblade: Shogun Steel	Merci / Energy Doji / Robo Doji	11 episodes
2013	The Listener	Lincoln Roth	Episode: "An Innocent Man"
2014–2016	Numb Chucks	Various characters	40 episodes
2015	Reign	Lord Barker	Episode: "Betrothed"
2015, 2017	Dark Matter	The General	2 episodes
2016	Rogue	Alexei	Episode: "How to Treat Us"
2016	Gangland Undercover	Tug	Episode: "Mongol Nation"
2017	Camp Lakebottom	Bob	Episode: "Lakebo-Tron / Rise of the Dawn of the Beginning of the Planet of Armand!"
2017	Christmas Next Door	Bruce	Television film
2018–2019	Rusty Rivets	Botarilla	6 episodes
2019	Corn & Peg	Teddy	Episode: "Let's Go Fly a Corn/Cattle Drive"
2019	Christmas in Paris	Cliff	Television film
2019	D.N. Ace	Night Leaper	Episode: "Mommelganger"
2020	The Boys	Love Sausage	Episode: "The Bloody Doors Off"
2022	Hero Elementary	Branch Man	Episode: "Friends of the Forest; Chicken Hero"
2022–2023	My Little Pony: Make Your Mark	Alphabittle Blossomforth (voice)	Taking over role originated by Phil LaMarr
2022–2024	My Little Pony: Tell Your Tale	Berries / Alphabittle Blossomforth (voice)	
2023	Star Trek: Strange New Worlds	Captain D'Chok	Episode: "The Broken Circle"
2023	Scott Pilgrim Takes Off	Lobby Announcer (voice)	Episode: "The World vs. Scott Pilgrim"
2023	Catch Me If You Claus	Santa	Television film
2024	Shifting Gears	Steven	Television film

=== Video games ===
Year	Title	Role	Notes
1995	Marvel Super Heroes	Hulk / Thanos	
1997	Marvel Super Heroes vs. Street Fighter	Hulk	
1997	Marvel vs. Capcom: Clash of Super Heroes	Hulk / Orange Hulk / Thor	
2000	Marvel vs. Capcom 2: New Age of Heroes	Hulk / Thanos of Titan	
2005	Devil Kings	Lark	
