= Just Take My Heart =

2009 book by Mary Higgins Clark

First edition (publ. Simon & Schuster)

Just Take My Heart is a romantic suspense novel by Mary Higgins Clark. It was released in print and Audio CD on April 7, 2009.

== Critical reception ==
Terri Schlichenmeyer of the Savannah Morning News said that the "'bad guy' is one of the creepiest, most unsettling killers I've seen in a long time."
