= A Stranger Is Watching (novel) =

1977 novel by Mary Higgins Clark

- First edition cover
- Author: Mary Higgins Clark
- Language: English
- Genre: Thriller novel
- Publisher: Simon & Schuster
- Publication date: 1977
- Publication place: United States
- Media type: Print (hardback & paperback)
- Pages: 256 pp (first edition hardcover)
- ISBN: 0-671-23071-9 (first edition hardcover)
- OCLC: 3380058
- Dewey Decimal: 813/.5/4
- LC Class: PZ4.C5942 St 1978 PS3553.L287
- Preceded by: Where Are the Children?
- Followed by: The Cradle Will Fall

A Stranger Is Watching (1977) is a suspense novel by Mary Higgins Clark.

== Plot summary ==
The main characters in the novel are Steve Peterson, whose wife Nina was murdered two years before, his six-year-old son Neil, who witnessed the murder, and Sharon Martin, a young journalist who befriends them both. The novel opens as Steve and Sharon debate capital punishment. A young man named Ronald Thompson has been sentenced to death for Nina's murder. Sharon is against the death penalty and tries to save Thompson. Unknown to them, Thompson is actually innocent. The real killer is a psychopath named August Rommel Taggart, Arty for short. He calls himself Foxy because General Rommel was called the desert fox. He kidnaps Sharon and Neil, hiding them under New York's famed Grand Central Station. The rest of the novel describes the race against time to save the three innocent people.

== Film adaptation ==
The novel was made into a 1982 film starring Rip Torn, James Naughton, and Kate Mulgrew.
