= A Stranger Is Watching (film) =

1982 American horror film by Sean S. Cunningham

- Film poster
- Directed by: Sean S. Cunningham
- Screenplay by: Earl Mac Rauch; Victor Miller
- Based on: A Stranger Is Watching by Mary Higgins Clark
- Produced by: Sidney Beckerman
- Starring: Kate Mulgrew; Rip Torn; James Naughton; Shawn von Schreiber; Barbara Baxley
- Cinematography: Barry Abrams
- Edited by: Susan E. Cunningham
- Music by: Lalo Schifrin
- Production companies: Metro-Goldwyn-Mayer; Heron Communications
- Distributed by: United Artists
- Release date: January 22, 1982
- Running time: 92 minutes
- Country: United States
- Language: English
- Budget: $3.2 million
- Box office: $2.5 million

A Stranger is Watching is a 1982 American thriller film directed by Sean S. Cunningham. The screenplay was written by Earl Mac Rauch and Victor Miller, based on the 1977 novel of the same name by Mary Higgins Clark.

== Plot ==
Steve Peterson's wife, Nina is murdered in front of their young daughter Julie. Three years later, Julie and Peterson's new girlfriend Sharon Martin are kidnapped by the same killer, the psychotic Artie Taggart. Taggart imprisons them in a bunker below Grand Central Station, throwing the police into a race against time to save them.

== Cast ==
- Kate Mulgrew as Sharon Martin
- Rip Torn as Artie Taggart
- James Naughton as Steve Peterson
- Shawn von Schreiber as Julie Peterson
- Barbara Baxley as Lally
- Stephen Joyce as Detective Taylor
- James Russo as Ronald Thompson
- Frank Hamilton as Bill Lufts
- Maggie Task as Mrs. Lufts
- Roy Poole as Walter Kurner
- Maurice Copeland as Roger Perry
- Eleanor Phelps as Glenda Perry
- Joanne Dorian as Nina Peterson
- Stephen Strimpell as Detective Marlowe
- David Allen Brooks as Big Bum
- William Hickey as Maxi
- Jennie Ventriss as Kathy Green

== Development ==
The film's script was written by Earl Mac Rauch and Victor Miller, based on the novel by the same name by Mary Higgins Clark. Filming took place in New York City during 1981. Kate Mulgrew and Rip Torn were both confirmed as starring in the film.

== Release ==
A Stranger is Watching premiered in the United States on January 22, 1982.

== Critical reception ==
Critical reception for the film was generally negative. Stephen Hunter of The Baltimore Sun was critical, stating that "Cunningham is close to being a film illiterate" and that "Cunningham and his cinematographer Barry Abrams (who should never be allowed to work again) attempt to play up the spooky, shadowy terror of this nightworld. What they create instead is a murky, grainy mess."

Allmovie was more favorable, writing "Sean Cunningham's first post-Friday the 13th film was shrugged off by most critics, but it is better than its reputation might lead one to believe." Janet Maslin of The New York Times thought the film is "a lot better" than Friday the 13th, and noted: "The story offers a few surprises, and the bowels of the railway station are scenic, in their grubby way."
