= Carol Higgins Clark =

American author (1956–2023)

- Higgins Clark at the 2000 Distinguished Author Award
- Born: July 28, 1956; New York City, U.S.
- Died: June 12, 2023 (aged 66); Los Angeles, California, U.S.
- Education: Mount Holyoke College (BA)
- Occupation: Novelist
- Relatives: Mary Higgins Clark (mother) Mary Jane Clark (former sister-in-law)
- Writing career
- Genre: Mystery
- Notable work: Regan Reilly series

Carol Higgins Clark (July 28, 1956 – June 12, 2023) was an American mystery author. She was the daughter of suspense writer Mary Higgins Clark, with whom she co-authored several Christmas novels, and the former sister-in-law of author Mary Jane Clark.

== Writing career ==
Born in New York City and raised in Washington Township, Bergen County, New Jersey, Clark attended Immaculate Heart Academy. She received her B.A. from Mount Holyoke College. During college, she began re-typing her mother's transcripts. She also made contributions such as renaming locations and characters. She was the only one of the five Clark siblings to become a writer. One thing that influenced this decision was helping her mother. While Mary Higgins Clark attempted juggling a full-time job and trying to finish her second book, the younger Higgins Clark grasped this opportunity to familiarize herself with the process of writing a book and telling tales, not knowing this would be her start in becoming a well-known author. Just as her mother did, Clark wrote suspense books. One difference in the mother and daughter's writings is that Clark's books contain a slight sense of humor that her mother's do not possess. All of her novels feature Regan Reilly (a famous recurring character), plot points about male escorts, and pantyhose conventions that come from real sources. In her video for NJN Public Television, Clark explains how she used her first job experience to help her with ideas about her book. In her book Iced, she uses a woman who is working at a dry cleaners. The woman uncovers evidence found in the pockets of a customer.

== Acting ==
Clark chose acting as her profession and began to study acting after graduating from Mount Holyoke College. In 1975, she starred in "Who Killed Amy Lang", which aired on Good Morning America. She also performed in Wendy Wasserstein's play "Uncommon Women". She played the lead in the film A Cry In The Night, based on a novel by her mother.

== Personal life and death ==
In 2001, Clark appeared as a contestant on the game show To Tell The Truth; three of the panelists correctly identified her.

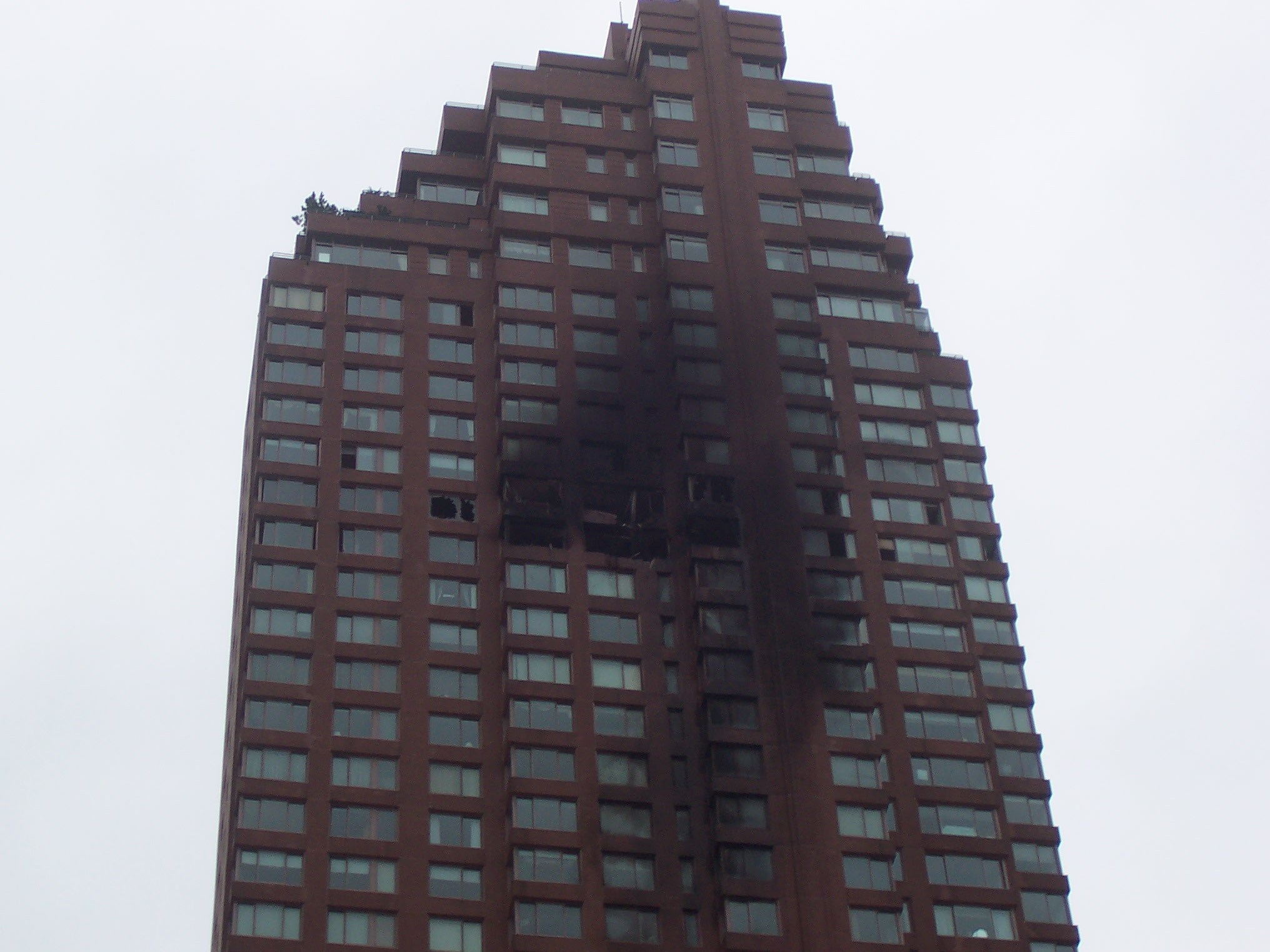
The impact damage to the Belaire Apartments

Clark's New York apartment building, The Belaire, was hit by a small plane on October 11, 2006 flown by New York Yankees pitcher Cory Lidle. Her 38th floor condominium was just a floor below the main impact zone; she was not at home during the accident.

On June 12, 2023, Clark died at Cedars-Sinai Medical Center in Los Angeles of appendix cancer at the age of 66.

== Bibliography ==
=== Regan Reilly series ===
- Clark, Carol Higgins (1992). Decked. New York: Grand Central Publishing. ISBN 0-446-51549-3. OCLC 24627336.
- ————————— (1993). Snagged. New York: Warner Books. ISBN 0-446-51548-5. OCLC 27897123.
- ————————— (1995). Iced. New York: Warner Books. ISBN 978-0-446-51764-5. OCLC 32167693.
- ————————— (1998). Twanged. New York: Warner Books. ISBN 0-446-51763-1. OCLC 37801332.
- Clark, Mary Higgins (2000). Deck the Halls. Carol Higgins Clark. New York: Simon & Schuster/Scribner. ISBN 0-7432-1200-2. OCLC 44640199. (co-written with Mary Higgins Clark; crossover with Mary's Willy & Alvirah series)
- Clark, Carol Higgins (2001). Fleeced. New York: Scribner. ISBN 0-7432-0581-2. OCLC 47623810.
- ————————— (2002). Jinxed. New York: Scribner. ISBN 0-7432-0582-0. OCLC 50435405.
- ————————— (2003). Popped. New York: Pocket Books. ISBN 0-7434-7665-4. OCLC 55850168.
- Clark, Mary Higgins (2006). The Christmas Thief. Carol Higgins Clark. New York: Pocket Books. ISBN 978-0-7432-7225-4. OCLC 75407602. (co-written with Mary Higgins Clark; crossover with Mary's Willy & Alvirah series)
- Clark, Carol Higgins (2005). Burned. New York: Scribner. ISBN 0-7432-4275-0. OCLC 57641681.
- ————————— (2006). Hitched. New York: Scribner. ISBN 0-7432-8942-0. OCLC 65284653.
- Clark, Mary Higgins (2006). Santa Cruise: A Holiday Mystery at Sea. Carol Higgins Clark. New York: Simon & Schuster / Scribner. ISBN 978-1-4165-3552-2. OCLC 77076961. (co-written with Mary Higgins Clark; crossover with Mary's Willy & Alvirah series)
- Clark, Carol Higgins (2008). Laced. New York: Pocket Star Books. ISBN 978-1-4165-2337-6. OCLC 194155472.
- ————————— (2009). Zapped. New York: Pocket Star Books. ISBN 978-1-4165-6382-2. OCLC 301707390.
- Clark, Mary Higgins (2008). Dashing Through the Snow. Carol Higgins Clark. New York: Pocket Books. ISBN 978-1-4391-3008-7. OCLC 701235836. (co-written with Mary Higgins Clark; crossover with Mary's Willy & Alvirah series)
- Clark, Carol Higgins (2009). Cursed. New York: Scribner. ISBN 978-1-4165-6217-7. OCLC 232979179.
- ————————— (2010). Wrecked. New York. ISBN 978-1-4391-7025-0. OCLC 424555495.
- ————————— (2012). Mobbed. New York: Pocket Books. ISBN 978-1-4391-7029-8. OCLC 741542639.
- ————————— (2012). Gypped. New York: Scribner. ISBN 978-1-4391-7031-1. OCLC 765969859.
- ————————— (2015). Knocked. New York. ISBN 978-1-4767-1051-8. OCLC 883147492. (due date per publisher)

=== Other novels co-authored with her mother ===
- Clark, Mary Higgins (2001). He Sees You When You're Sleeping. Carol Higgins Clark. London: Pocket. ISBN 0-7434-4099-4. OCLC 50527235.

=== Collections co-authored with her mother ===
- Clark, Mary Higgins (2010). The Christmas Collection. Carol Higgins Clark. Riverside: Simon & Schuster. ISBN 978-1-4516-4013-7. OCLC 1085170869.
- A Holiday Collection (2010)

=== Awards ===
Clark's début novel Decked was nominated for the 1992 Agatha Award and the 1993 Anthony Award for "Best First Novel".

== See also ==
- List of crime writers
