= The Associate (novel) =

Novel by John Grisham

- First edition cover
- Author: John Grisham
- Language: English
- Genre: Thriller novel
- Publisher: Doubleday
- Publication date: January 26, 2009
- Publication place: United States
- Media type: Print (hardcover)
- Pages: 384 pp
- ISBN: 978-0-385-51783-6
- OCLC: 232980206
- Dewey Decimal: 813/.54 22
- LC Class: PS3557.R5355 A95 2009
- Preceded by: The Appeal
- Followed by: Ford County

The Associate is a legal thriller by John Grisham. His 21st novel, it was published by Doubleday and released in the United States on January 26, 2009.

== Plot summary ==
After graduating from Yale Law School, idealistic Kyle McAvoy intends to devote three years to public service before applying for employment with a prestigious firm. However, his plans are derailed when he is approached and questioned by two men claiming to be FBI agents, who then pass him on to a mysterious man named Bennie Wright. Bennie has a videotape of a party that took place in Kyle's apartment five years earlier, when he was an undergraduate student at Duquesne University. In it, two of Kyle's fraternity brothers, Joey Bernardo and Baxter Tate, are seen having sexual relations with Elaine Keenan, a young woman who later claimed she was raped while unconscious. At the time, police determined there had been no assault and declined to take further action. With the tape now in his possession, Bennie threatens to expose Kyle's secret unless he cooperates.

Bennie's plan is to have Kyle accept a position at New York-based Scully & Pershing, the world's largest law firm, which is representing Trylon Aeronautics in its case against Bartin Dynamics. The two defense contractors had joined forces to design the B-10 HyperSonic Bomber for the Pentagon, and when they won the contract over Lockheed, the competitor sought support from senators and lobbyists. Legal battles ensued, and Trylon and Bartin, each laying claim to ownership of the design, are now ready to battle in court. Kyle will be required to infiltrate Scully & Pershing's files and deliver to Bennie crucial information desired by the people he represents. Kyle's first instinct is to ignore Bennie's blackmail, but the thought of the shame his family would suffer if he were indicted for his role in the date rape, not to mention the negative impact on his future, leads him to agree to Bennie's demands.

Constantly watched while outdoors and living in an apartment he knows is bugged, Kyle slowly learns how to trick those who are trailing him. He seeks help from Joey, who has more to lose than Kyle does if the videotape is made public, and plots to outwit Bennie. Creating an interest in spy novels, he learns about all the different technical components and devices used in surveillance and learns about a store nearby specializing in gadgets and devices for this purpose. What he doesn't anticipate is the re-emergence of Elaine, who still maintains she was raped, and Baxter, who has completed a lengthy stint in rehab and, as part of his twelve-step program, wants to make amends to her. His confession will give Elaine the proof she needs to file charges, and with Kyle drawn into the spotlight, his position at Scully & Pershing will be jeopardized–a risk Bennie must eliminate by any means. Baxter is found shot dead, with Kyle certain that Bennie ordered it.

After working at Scully & Pershing's "boot camp" for some months, Kyle eventually gets drawn into the Trylon case and is granted access to the highly secure computer room where the case files are stored. Bennie and Nigel, a computer expert, force him to use a thumbdrive to download the files. But by this time, realizing that Bennie is nearly always one step ahead of him, Kyle tells the whole story to Roy Benedict, a criminal lawyer and former FBI operative. Roy still has good connections within the Bureau, and they set up an operation to catch Bennie while Roy transfers information that is not sensitive. However, it misfires; Bennie and his associates vanish and remain at large, although Kyle thinks he's working for some other branch of the government.

Kyle admits his actions to the firm's partners and agrees to leave their employ immediately, and not practice law in New York. He also voices his belief that one of the firm's partners has acted as a mole, passing information to Bennie. Refusing the FBI's offer of witness protection, Kyle goes home to his father, also a lawyer, who knows what has happened and has already signed a deal with Elaine and her lawyer. Kyle plans to become a partner in his father's law firm. Roy, himself a highly paid New York lawyer, is a bit surprised at Kyle's decision: "The Editor of the Yale Law Journal – practicing law on Main Street in York, Pennsylvania?" to which Kyle answers exuberantly: "I have never been more serious! Real clients. Real people. Real cases. Deer hunting on Saturdays, Steelers on Sundays. A real life."

== Background ==
Grisham's plot is based in part on the case of a Las Vegas man, William Beebe, who, as part of his Alcoholics Anonymous program, wrote a letter of apology to a woman named Liz Seccuro that he had raped at a fraternity party at the University of Virginia in 1984. It had been a gang rape at Phi Kappa Psi fraternity – the other two perpetrators were not indicted. Her claim had been ignored by the University police and school officials at the time, but nineteen years later his admission of guilt resulted in his being charged with rape by Charlottesville Police and the Commonwealth of Virginia, and eventually serving six months in prison after plea bargaining.

== Critical reception ==
Janet Maslin of The New York Times stated, "Mr. Grisham so often writes similar books that the same things must be said of them. The Associate is true to form: it grabs the reader quickly, becomes impossible to put down, stays that way through most of its story, and then escalates into plotting so crazily far-fetched that it defies resolution. Kyle McAvoy is another of the two-dimensional yet terrifically likeable heroes who come to life on Mr. Grisham’s pages only to evaporate later. It’s easy to predict what choice Kyle will make at the end of the novel. It’s impossible to imagine, let alone care, what his life will be like once the improbably wild furor surrounding this one lone law-firm recruit is over."

Richard Rayner of the Los Angeles Times said, "Nobody goes to Grisham for style, and there's a sense here of a skilled craftsman cranking it out on autopilot. Nothing much happens, and when it happens, it's pretty predictable. Grisham's Kyle is cardboard-thin (Scott Turow has a much defter hand with character), but Grisham is an effective lens through which we observe the intricacies of corporate law, an easily corruptible world governed, not by right and wrong, but by the concept of the billable hour . . . The Associate springs to angry life from time to time, but on the whole it's by the numbers, a plodding page-turner. But it's still a page-turner: Many of Grisham's legions of fans will doubtless sign up for this latest ride, eager to see how Kyle McAvoy manages to get himself out of the hole. With ideals restored, Grisham ensures, making Kyle an appealing model for our troubled new time."

Patrick Anderson of The Washington Post observed, "Grisham has long since proved his narrative talent. His plot is highly fanciful, and he makes it easy for us to keep flipping the pages to see if Kyle can find a way out of this mess. He mostly writes clean, workmanlike prose, but I have one stylistic complaint about the novel. It's important to Grisham not only that Kyle be seen as noble, but also that his tormentor be a rat. Thus, as Bennie spits out his nefarious demands, we're variously told that he speaks 'with a sneer,' with a 'smart-ass grin,' with a 'silly smirk.' Enough already; we get it."

Charles Taylor of Newsday said, "You don't need to be sadistic or foul-mouthed to write a good thriller, but you need exactly what Grisham lacks: a taste for cunning, meanness and grit. He sets up a big showdown only to walk away from it, and so the tension just dribbles off. Worse, Grisham's country-mouse attitude toward the big, bad city - where apartments rent for thousands of dollars a month and you can't find a good $3.99 blue-plate special at the local diner - is a drag. Who wants to reach for a thriller and wind up with Frank Capra?"

Lev Grossman of Time said the novel "ticks along lightly and pleasantly — it's crafted and paced with the same signature glossy perfection that makes Grisham, book for book, probably the best-selling novelist in the world. It's just that it's not about anything. In fact it's amazing that anybody could put together a book that is this compulsively readable while at the same time being almost entirely devoid of substance of any kind . . . The Associate is as close to being about nothing as a book can be — it's a masterpiece of almost ghostly narrative minimalism, a book of names without characters, a book with plot points but no plot. There's something comforting about the meaningless hindbrain tension that The Associate generates in the reader — empty tension, the kind where there's nothing genuine at stake. Comforting too is the cozy quaintness of Grisham's little world. It's supposed to be a scary place, in theory, full of brooding criminals and impossible choices, but it's really a relic of the American past, one as sentimental and archaic as a Norman Rockwell painting . . . The Associate is high-calorie comfort food, a thriller that doesn't actually thrill."

Joshua Rozenberg of The Observer said, "Suffice it to say that The Associate bears many similarities to The Firm, even down to the two dust jackets, which both show shadowy young lawyers on the run. Plagiarism? No, because both books are by John Grisham. Those who believed, even for a moment, that I was suggesting impropriety will recognise this as the sort of false trail that Grisham uses to good effect . . . Though our hero believes himself to be in the clear, he goes along with the blackmailers' demands. The reader screams at him to call their bluff, but that would ruin the story. So we suspend our disbelief. Then, just as we have got used to the idea, he changes his mind and sets about trapping the blackmailers after all. And that's it. The ending is curiously flat."
