= Riskalyze =

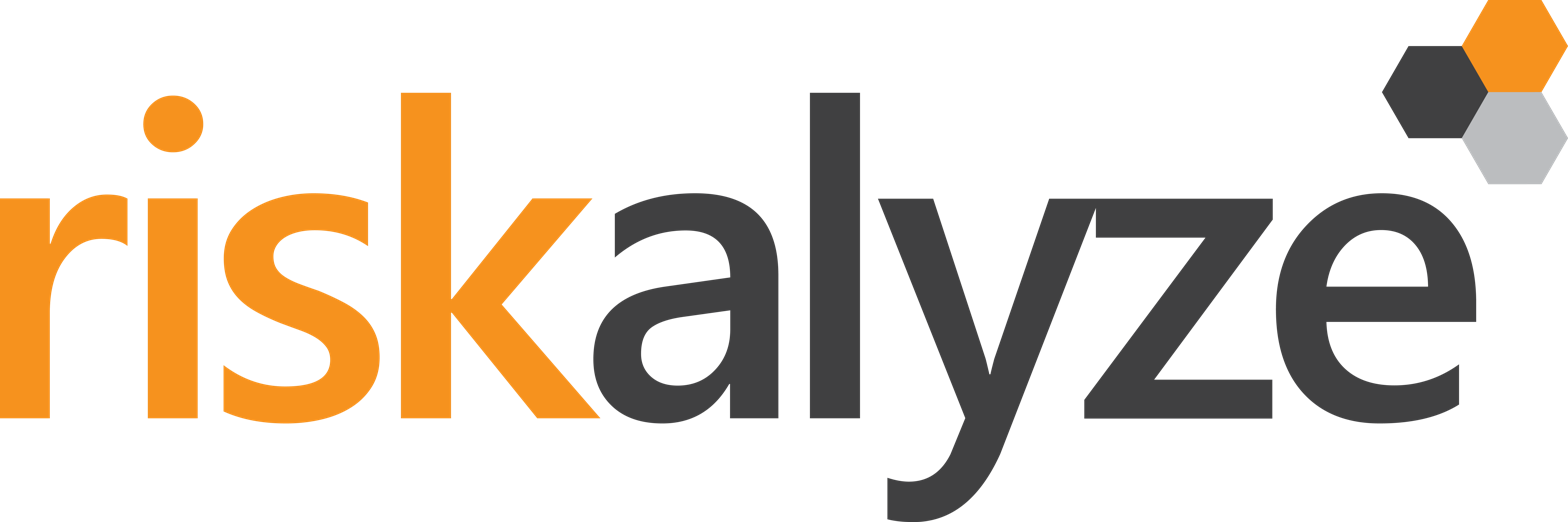
- Company type: Private
- Industry: Financial services, Software
- Founded: 2011; 15 years ago
- Founders: Aaron Klein (CEO); Mike McDaniel (CIO); Matt Pistone (CTO)
- Headquarters: Auburn, California
- Products: Riskalyze Select; Riskalyze Elite; Riskalyze Trading; Command Center
- Number of employees: ~200
- Website: www.riskalyze.com

Riskalyze is a financial technology company that provides software as a service to financial advisors in the United States. Riskalyze's platform provides tools for analyzing investment risk, delivering 401(k) plans, and building and implementing investment portfolios.

Riskalyze invented the Risk Number, an alignment tool for financial advisors to quantitatively measure investor risk tolerance, risk capacity, and portfolio risk on a scale from 1 to 99.

== History ==
Co-founders Aaron Klein (Chief Executive Officer), Mike McDaniel (Chief Investment Officer), and Matt Pistone (Chief Technology Officer) founded the company in 2011. Riskalyze was initially a free consumer product, but became a tool licensed to financial advisors after a shift in the business model.

In 2016, Riskalyze raised Series-A institutional funding of $20 million from FTV Capital, and was then recapitalized by Hg in 2021. Riskalyze was recognized by Fast Company on its list of The World’s Top 10 Most Innovative Companies in Finance 2013 and The World’s Top 10 Most Innovative Companies in Personal Finance 2015. Forbes recognized Riskalyze on its Fintech 50 list in 2015 and 2016.

== Current operations ==
In August 2017, Riskalyze was reported to support 20,000 advisors collectively representing hundreds of billions in assets under management. Riskalyze has approximately 225 employees, two offices in Auburn, California, and one office in Atlanta, Georgia in the Bank of America Plaza.
