= To the nines (disambiguation) =

To the nines is an idiom meaning "to perfection" or "to the highest degree".

To the Nines may also refer to:

- To the Nines (Only Crime album), 2004
- To the Nines (Hatesphere album), 2009
- To the Nines (novel), a 2003 Janet Evanovich novel
