= South River High School =

South River High School may refer to:

- South River High School (Maryland) in Edgewater, Maryland
- South River High School (New Jersey) in South River, New Jersey
