= List of Super Smash Bros. Brawl tournaments =

This list includes tournament results for Super Smash Bros. Brawl.

== Major tournament results ==
Tournament	Location	Date	Format	Entrants	Prize pool	1st	2nd	3rd	4th
GENESIS	Philadelphia, Pennsylvania	February 7–8, 2009	Singles	292	US$5,841	Ally	Mew2King	Tyrant	Dojo
GENESIS	Philadelphia, Pennsylvania	February 7–8, 2009	Doubles	108	US$3,118	Mew2King, Fiction	Ally, Sean	Dojo, UTDZac	Havoc, Mike Haze
Apex 2009	Princeton, New Jersey	May 9–10, 2009	Singles	210	US$2,250	Ally	Mew2King	Iain	Anti
Apex 2009	Princeton, New Jersey	May 9–10, 2009	Doubles	77	US$1,500	Mew2King, Ally	UltimateRazer, UTDZac	Inui, Atomsk	Anti, Judge
EVO 2009	Las Vegas, Nevada	July 17–19, 2009	Singles	128	US$1,920	Mew2King	Ally	Mike Haze	Tyrant
EVO 2009	Las Vegas, Nevada	July 17–19, 2009	Doubles	53		Mew2King, Ally	Fiction, Mike Haze	Havoc, Hall	SK92, FOW
Pound 4	Frederick, Maryland	January 16–18, 2010	Singles	192		ADHD	Mew2King	Ally	Ksizzle
Pound 4	Frederick, Maryland	January 16–18, 2010	Doubles	78		Mew2King, Ally	Atomsk, Lee Martin	ADHD, CO18	DMBrandon, Shadow
MLG Orlando 2010	Kissimmee, Florida	April 16–18, 2010	Singles	184	US$7,000	Mew2King	Ally	Tyrant	ESAM
MLG Orlando 2010	Kissimmee, Florida	April 16–18, 2010	Doubles	45	US$880	Mew2King, Ally	DEHF, Tyrant	Zex, Fatal	Lee Martin, Atomsk
MLG Columbus 2010	Columbus, Ohio	June 4–6, 2010	Singles	250	US$7,000	Mew2King	Ally	Nick Riddle	Lee Martin
MLG Columbus 2010	Columbus, Ohio	June 4–6, 2010	Doubles	64	US$1,280	Mew2King, Ally	Nick Riddle, Shaky	Gnes, Dojo	Mike Haze, Havoc
Apex 2010	Kissimmee, Florida	August 6–8, 2010	Singles	269	US$4,035	DEHF	Brood	Mew2King	Lee Martin
Apex 2010	Kissimmee, Florida	August 6–8, 2010	Doubles	93	US$930	Mew2King, Lee Martin	ChuDat, Junebug	Gnes, UltimateRazer	Atomsk, Nairo
MLG Raleigh 2010	Raleigh, North Carolina	August 27–29, 2010	Singles	148	US$7,000	Mew2King	Lee Martin	Felix	Seibrik
MLG Raleigh 2010	Raleigh, North Carolina	August 27–29, 2010	Doubles	42	US$840	Mew2King, Ally	ADHD, Fatal	Atomsk, DEHF	ESAM, MVD
MLG DC 2010	Washington, D.C.	October 15–17, 2010	Singles	174	US$7,000	ADHD	Rich Brown	Mew2King	ESAM
MLG DC 2010	Washington, D.C.	October 15–17, 2010	Doubles	42	US$840	Nairo, Anti	Ally, Mew2King	DEHF, Felix	Tearbear, Kadaj
MLG Dallas 2010	Dallas, Texas	November 5–7, 2010	Singles	174	US$35,000	Gnes	Tyrnat	ESAM	Ally
MLG Dallas 2010	Dallas, Texas	November 5–7, 2010	Doubles	48	US$960	Ally, Lee Martin	Nick Riddle, Shaky	DEHF, Gnes	ESAM, MVD
Pound V	Arlington, Virginia	February 19–21, 2011	Singles	151	US$2,265	Ally	Anti	Seibrik	ESAM
Pound V	Arlington, Virginia	February 19–21, 2011	Doubles	48	US$1,440	Mew2King, Anti	Ally, ADHD	ESAM, MVD	Jerm, Trela
GENESIS 2	Antioch, California	July 15–17, 2011	Singles	197	US$6,875	Mew2King	Ally	ADHD	Gnes
GENESIS 2	Antioch, California	July 15–17, 2011	Doubles	64	US$3,540	Mew2King, Ally	Gnes, UltimateRazer	ADHD, Seibrik	ESAM, MVD
Apex 2012	Rutgers University–New Brunswick	January 6–8, 2012	Singles	400	US$8,000	Otori	Nietono	Nairo	ESAM
Apex 2012	Rutgers University–New Brunswick	January 6–8, 2012	Doubles	128	US$1,216	Kakera, Otori	Anti, Mew2King	Gnes, UltimateRazer	ADHD, Nairo
SKTAR	South River, New Jersey	July 14–15, 2012	Singles	140	US$1,400	Nairo	ESAM	Vinnie	Anti
SKTAR	South River, New Jersey	July 14–15, 2012	Doubles	52	US$900	Mew2King, Trela	Ally, Nairo	Anti, Boss	Tyrant, Rich Brown
Apex 2013	Rutgers University–New Brunswick	January 11–13, 2013	Singles	338	US$6,570	Salem	Mew2King	Otori	Nairo
Apex 2013	Rutgers University–New Brunswick	January 11–13, 2013	Doubles	110	US$2,310	Nairo, ADHD	Ally, Mew2King	FOW, MJG	Rich Brown, Tyrant
SKTAR 2	Somerset, New Jersey	August 3–4, 2013	Singles	141	US$1,410	ADHD	MVD	Denti	Nakat
SKTAR 2	Somerset, New Jersey	August 3–4, 2013	Doubles	45	US$900	ADHD, Nairo	False, Nakat	Nick Riddle, Shaky	Ally, ZeRo
Apex 2014	Somerset, New Jersey	January 17–19, 2014	Singles	370	US$6,325	Nairo	CT | ZeRo	ESAM	EMP | Mew2King
Apex 2014	Somerset, New Jersey	January 17–19, 2014	Doubles	114	US$2,280	Nairo, ADHD	Ally, Anti	ESAM, MVD	Nick Riddle, Shaky
WHOBO		May 2014							
SKTAR 3	Somerset, New Jersey	May 31–June 1, 2014	Singles	97		9B	Nairo	ESAM	CT | ZeRo
SKTAR 3	Somerset, New Jersey	May 31–June 1, 2014	Doubles	30		Nairo, ADHD	Mew2King, Ally	ESAM, MVD	ZeRo, Vex Kasnari
Apex 2015	Somerset, New Jersey	January 30–February 1, 2015	Singles	176	US$1,960	Boreal | Ally	Nairo	CT | MVD	CT | Salem
Apex 2015	Somerset, New Jersey	January 30–February 1, 2015	Doubles	41	US$410	Nairo, Ally	Salem, Mew2King	Seibrik, MVD	MJG, FOW
Super Smash Con	Chantilly, Virginia	August 6–9, 2015	Singles	121	US$6,190	COG | Mew2King	PG | ESAM	Nairo	V115
Super Smash Con	Chantilly, Virginia	August 6–9, 2015	Doubles	23	US$560	Nairo, V115	False, Nakat	Bloodcross, Pelca	Blindbeard, Cheesewhiz
Super Smash Con 2016	Chantilly, Virginia	August 11–14, 2016	Singles		152	iQHQ | Vinnie	V115	ST | ADHD	dT | ANTi
Super Smash Con 2016	Chantilly, Virginia	August 11–14, 2016	Doubles		96	ADHD, Nairo	Gomamugitya, Taiheita	V115, Blacktwins	Vinnie, Abadango
CEO Dreamland	Orlando, Florida	April 14–16, 2017	Singles	63		NRG | Nairo	V115	MVG | Salem	ICG | Seagull Joe
CEO Dreamland	Orlando, Florida	April 14–16, 2017	Doubles	16		Mew2King, Salem	Captain Zack, Nairo	Dabuz, ANTi	Seagull Joe, Player-1
