= Jonathan Janson =

Jonathan Janson is the name of:

- Jonathan Janson (painter) (born 1950), American painter and art historian
- Jonathan Janson (sailor) (1930–2015), British Olympic sailor
