= Playbook =

Playbook may refer to:

== Arts and entertainment ==
- Playbook (TV series), an American football show
- The Playbook (2005 TV series), an American comedy show
- The Playbook (2020 TV series), a docuseries
- "The Playbook" (How I Met Your Mother), a TV episode
- "Playbook", a daily feature of political newspaper Politico
- "Playbook", a series of stories in TV programme The Story Makers

== Sports ==
- Basketball playbook, sport strategies
- American football plays, or Football playbook, sport strategies

== Other uses ==
- BlackBerry PlayBook, a tablet computer
- Ansible Playbooks, files for repeating tasks

== See also ==
- Workflow, an orchestrated and repeatable pattern of activity
- Gamebook, a fictional work that allows the reader to participate in the story by making choices
- Play (theatre), a form of drama intended for theatrical performance
- Fleury Playbook, a medieval collection of Latin biblical dramas
