= Elmer Stout =

American football player (1929–2013)

No. 26
- Position: Linebacker

Personal information
- Born: November 23, 1929; South Amboy, New Jersey, U.S.
- Died: September 20, 2013 (aged 83); West Palm Beach, Florida, U.S.

Career information
- High school: South River (NJ)
- College: Oklahoma A&M

Awards and highlights
- First-team All-American (1950); First-team All-Eastern (1950)

Elmer Eugene Stout (November 23, 1929 – September 20, 2013) was an American football player. He was born in South Amboy, New Jersey and attended South River High School. After attending Valley Forge Military Academy he was admitted into the United States Military Academy at West Point, New York. At West Point, he played college football for the Army Cadets at the linebacker position. He was selected by the Associated Press and the Football Writers Association of America as a first-team linebacker and on their 1950 College Football All-America Teams. He later attended Oklahoma A&M University where he played college football at the linebacker and running back positions and received a civil engineering degree. He lived in South River, New Jersey, and worked for many years for Goodkind & O'Dea Consulting Engineers. He died in 2013 at age 83.
