= St. Mary's Church (South River, New Jersey) =

Historic church in New Jersey, United States

- U.S. National Register of Historic Places
- New Jersey Register of Historic Places
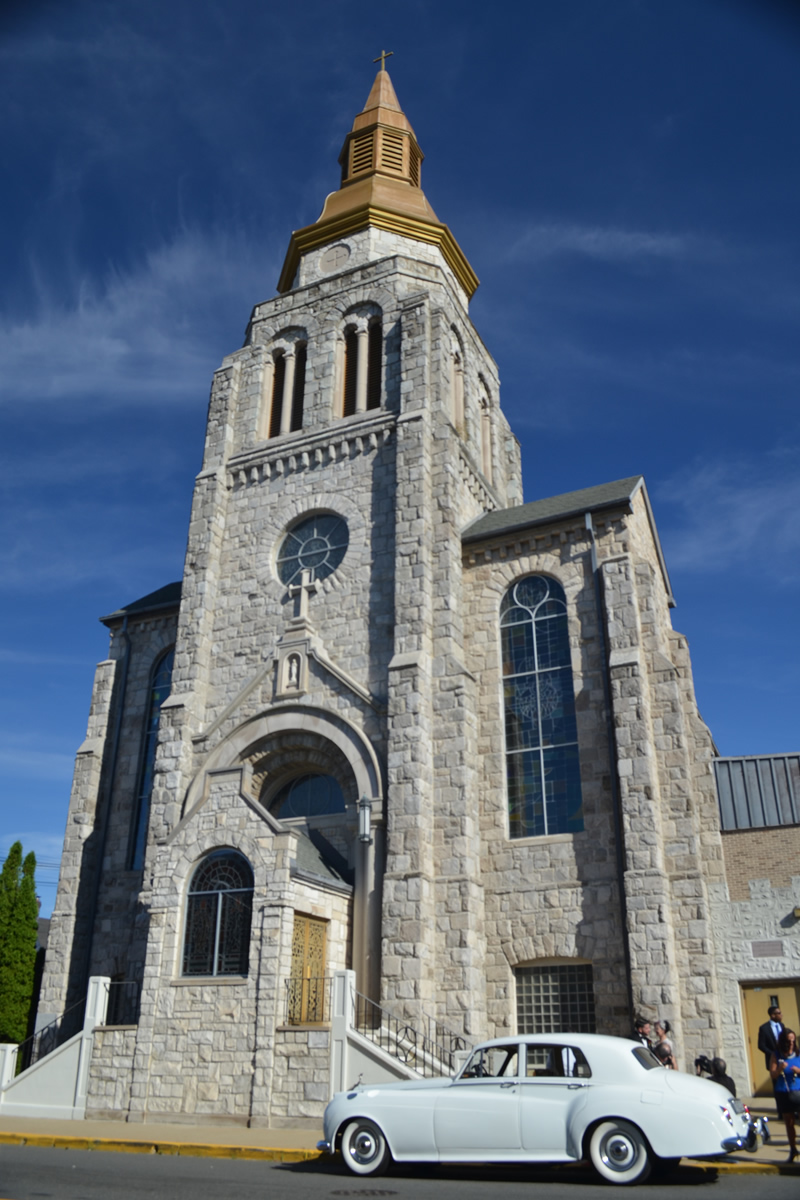

- Location within Middlesex County, New Jersey Location within New Jersey Location within the United States
- Location: Jct. of Jackson Street and Whitehead Avenue, South River, New Jersey
- Coordinates: 40°26′59″N 74°22′40″W
- Area: 0.3 acres (0.12 ha)
- Built: 1904
- Architect: Henry D. Dagit
- Architectural style: Romanesque
- NRHP reference No.: 03001276
- NJRHP No.: 4206

Significant dates
- Added to NRHP: December 10, 2003
- Designated NJRHP: October 24, 2003

St. Mary of Ostrabrama is a historic Polish Roman Catholic church at the junction of Jackson Street and Whitehead Avenue in South River, Middlesex County, New Jersey, United States.

It was built in 1904 and added to the National Register of Historic Places on December 10, 2003.

== History ==
During the late 1800s, there was a large influx of Polish immigrants in the South River/Sayreville area – the men found work in the brickyards and the women as needle operators in the factories on Whitehead Avenue. They worshiped at the only Catholic Church in the area at that time, was Our Lady of Victories in Sayreville. However, the community wanted to build a church where they could worship God in their native tongue, provide schooling for their children and carry on the traditions of their ancestors. An appeal was first made to the Bishop of Trenton by representatives of 252 families with 445 children in 1897. But this initial appeal was rejected.

The community worked diligently through many years of negotiations with the Bishop. Finally, on November 2, 1902. Bishop McFaul approved the petition to establish a new parish and Our Lady of Ostrabrama was born. In December 1902, the Bishop assigned Father Joseph Regorowicz to be the founding pastor of St. Mary's. The first mass of the new parish was celebrated in the Bohi factory on Water Street on December 16, 1902.

In the spring of 1903, the permanent site of the new church, the corner of Jackson Street and Whitehead Avenue was approved. The land was purchased for the sum of $2100. Construction of the new church began a few months later. Even after working long hours, the men of the parish came out with shovels and pickaxes to help with the excavation for the church foundation.

In a little less than a year, a roof covered the basement and mass was now celebrated in the church. Additionally, the parish acquired a six-acre plot in April 1905 to serve as the parish cemetery.

Father John Supenski was the second pastor of St. Mary's. His principal task was to complete the church building which up until this point had only been at the basement level. The projected cost was $4500 plus $3000 for the stained glass windows. Bishop McFaul blessed the church on October 11, 1908.

The third pastor was Father John Pawlowski. During his administration, St. Mary's began its parochial school sessions conducted by the Felician sisters in four classrooms in the basement of the church. The white main altar was also installed during this time.

Under the fourth pastor, Father Francis Czarnecki, the church purchased its first organ. Until that time, accordions provided the music for worship and devotion. In September 1919, five lots were purchased on the corner of Jackson Street and Holmes Avenue to be used for a new school. Father John Budzink became the fifth pastor. He began construction on the new school on June 17, 1927.

On November 24, 1928, Bishop John J. McMahon assigned Father Maximilian Wujek to be the sixth pastor of St. Mary's. Father Wujek, a graduate of the Polytechnic Institute of Lwow, Poland, had thorough training in construction and was able to supervise the subsequent parish construction.

Among the many projects he oversaw during his 41-year pastorate were the construction of a convent for the Bernadine sisters in 1940, the erection of the parish CYO building in 1960 and an additional wing to the school containing a new cafeteria and four classrooms. Father Wujek was elevated to Monsignor on September 16, 1938 by Pope Pius XI. After serving St. Mary's for 41 years, Monsignor Wujek retired in June 1969.

The seventh pastor was Father Michael Kseniak who had served as an associate under Monsignor Wojek in the 1940s. Father Kseniak was responsible for many renovations to the school including carpeting the classrooms, buying new desks, enlarging the school library purchasing the visual aid equipment and renovating the whole structure. There was a disastrous fire in 1970 after which the whole building was refurbished, air conditioning was installed, the St. Anne's Chapel was erected in the basement and basilica bells were installed in the tower. He also razed the house used as a rectory and built a new rectory in 1979. He became a monsignor in June 1986 and served St. Mary's until February 1987.

Father Vincent Nebus was installed as the eighth pastor in March 1987. A huge project undertaken by Father Nebus was the installation of an elevator in the church. He was also faced with addressing structural deterioration in the church due to the age of the church and the damage to the roof done by the fire years earlier. Under his leadership, the mortar on the interior church was redone, most of the exterior stone was removed and replaced, the chimney on the north side of the church was taken down and repaired and all the copper fixtures, including the small bell tower and downspouts were replaced with new copper fixtures. The artistic icon of our Lady of Czestochowa was also prepared and blessed to adorn our place of honor for Our Lady. Father Nebus retired in 1996.

Reverend Robert L. Weil assumed the responsibilities of the ninth pastor in 1996. Father Bob served in this capacity for less than two years but continued the refurbishment work that needed to be done. Work on the Chapel of St. Anne was done including painting, additional lighting and window coverings. He also added the statue of St. Joseph which now adorns the upper church. Father Bob left in 1998 to become Chaplain of the Shrine of Our Lady of Fatima at Washington, NJ.

The Most Reverent Bishop Vincent de Paul Breen assigned the Reverend Stanley G. Gromadzki to be the Church's Administrator. Father Stan accepted this assignment on June 9, 1998 and was officially installed as St. Mary's tenth Pastor on September 8, 1999. Fr. Stan set to work immediately to make much needed restorations in the school building. New floors were installed, the classrooms were painted and fans were bought. The school auditorium which lay idle for many years was refurbished. He also took on the work needed to restore the entire lower level of the church, including updating the Senior's Room and the Music Room. During his tenure, St. Mary's celebrated its Centennial and Fr. Stan oversaw not only the planning for this celebration but also the work to ensure the church was in good shape for this milestone celebration. These are but a few of the large projects Father Stan successfully addressed at St. Mary's. After 14 years at St. Mary's, Rev. Stanley G. Gromadzki assumed duties as pastor at Sacred Heart Church in South Amboy on June 12, 2012.

Most Rev. Paul G. Bootkoski, fourth Bishop of Metuchen, then appointed Rev. Michael J. Gromadzki Pastor of St. Mary's Church. Rev. Michael J. Gromadzki, so it happens, is the younger brother of Rev. Stanley G. Gromadzki and they are the first two brothers within the Diocese of Metuchen.
