= Janet Evanovich =

American writer (born 1943)

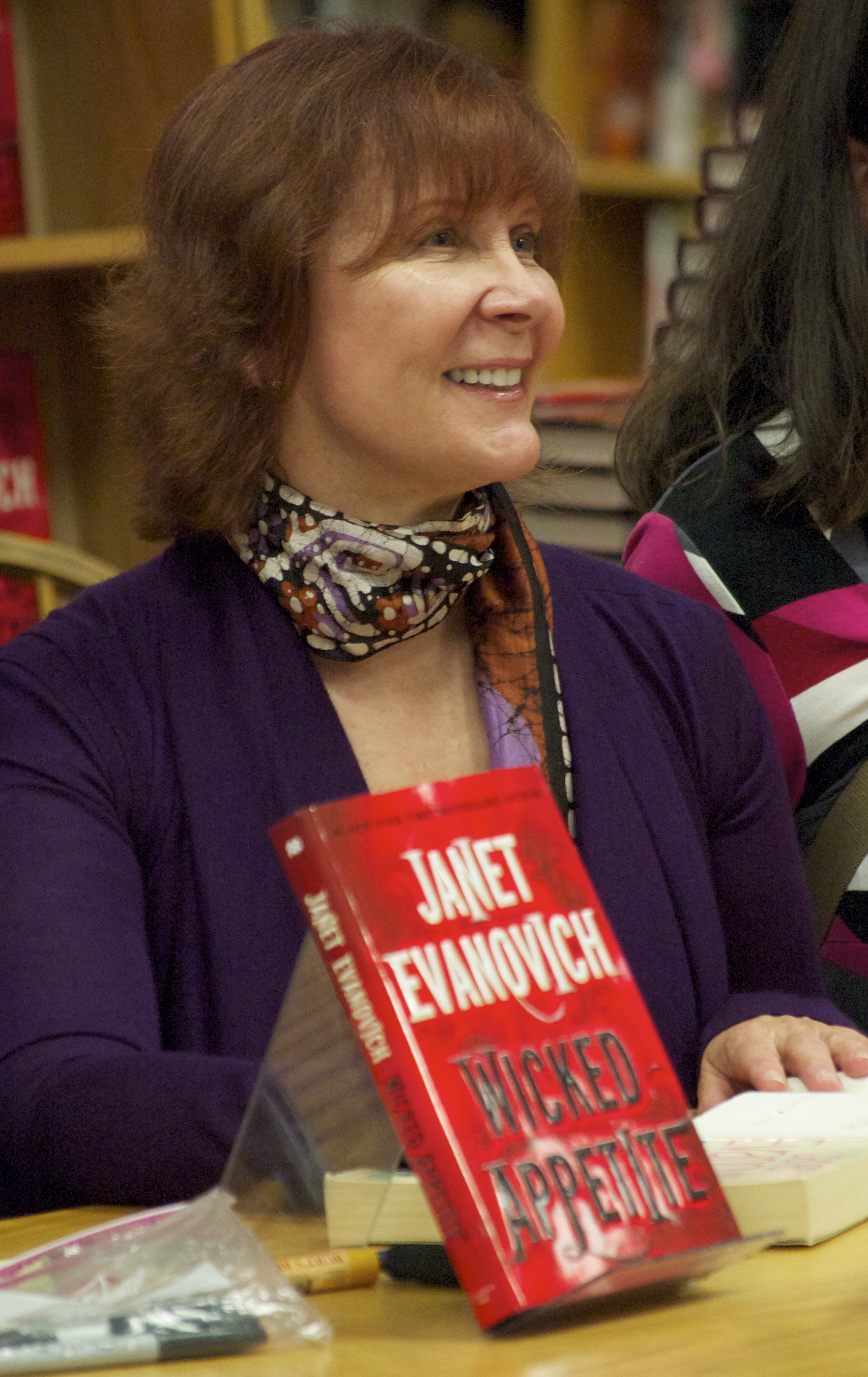
- Evanovich in 2010
- Born: Janet Schneider; April 22, 1943 (age 83); South River, New Jersey, U.S.
- Education: Rutgers University
- Occupation: Novelist
- Spouse: Pete Evanovich (m. 1964)
- Children: Peter, Alexandra
- Writing career
- Pen name: Steffie Hall
- Period: 1987–present
- Genres: Romance, suspense, mystery
- Notable work: Stephanie Plum series
- Website: www.evanovich.com

Signature
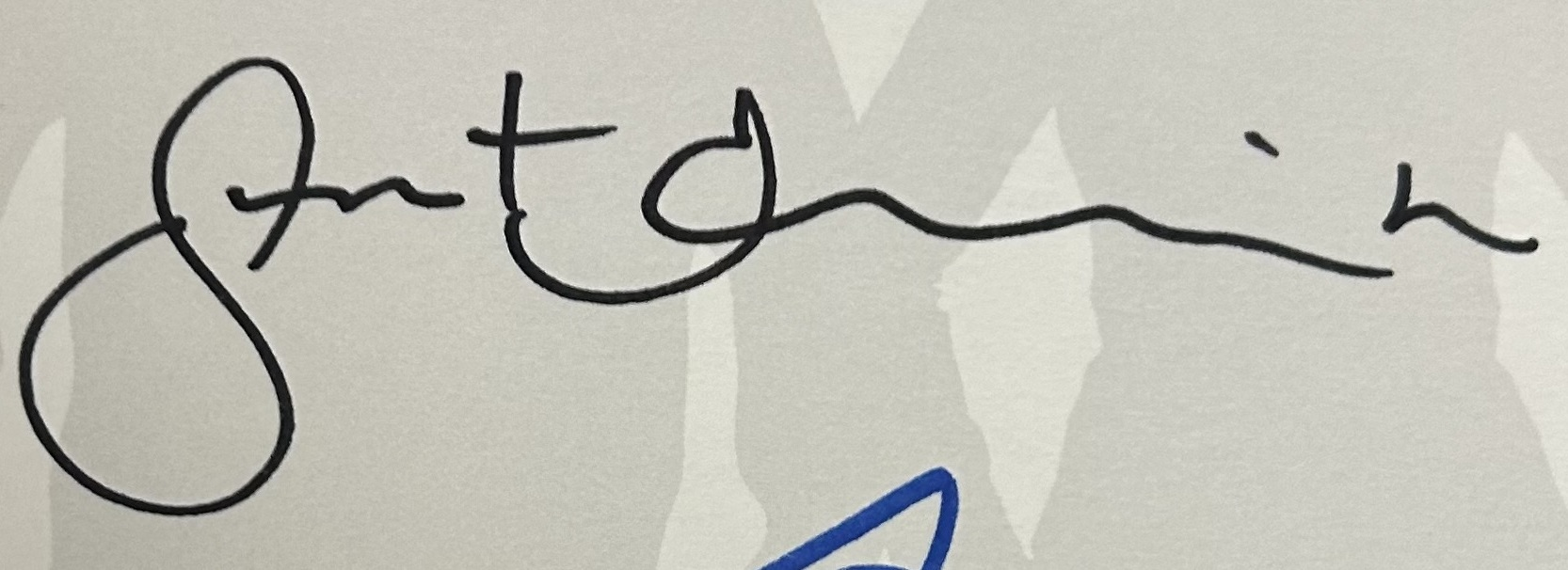

Janet Evanovich (née Schneider; April 22, 1943) is an American writer. She began her career writing short contemporary romance novels under the pen name Steffie Hall, but gained fame authoring a series of contemporary mysteries featuring Stephanie Plum, a former lingerie buyer from Trenton, New Jersey, who becomes a bounty hunter to make ends meet after losing her job. The novels in this series have been on The New York Times, USA Today, Wall Street Journal and Amazon bestseller lists. Evanovich has had her last seventeen Plums debut at #1 on the NY Times Best Sellers list and eleven of them have hit #1 on USA Today Best-Selling Books list. She has over two hundred million books in print worldwide, and her books have been translated into over 40 languages.

== Early years ==
Evanovich is a second-generation American born in South River, New Jersey, to a machinist and a housewife. After attending South River High School, she became the first in her family to attend college when she enrolled at Douglass Residential College, part of Rutgers University, to study art.

When Evanovich had children, she chose to become a housewife like her mother. In her thirties, she began writing novels. To learn the art of writing dialog, Evanovich took lessons in improv acting. For ten years, she attempted to write the Great American Novel, finishing three manuscripts that she was unable to sell. After someone suggested she try writing romance novels, Evanovich read several romances and discovered that she enjoyed the genre. She wrote two romances and submitted them for publishing. Still unable to find a publisher, Evanovich stopped writing and signed with a temporary employment agency. Several months after beginning work for them, she received an offer to buy her second romance manuscript for $2,000, which she considered an "astounding sum".

== Romance novels ==
That novel, Hero at Large, was published in 1987 in the Second Chance Love category line under the pseudonym Steffie Hall. The following year she began writing for Bantam Loveswept under her own name. For the next five years she continued to write category romances for Loveswept. Her work within the romance novel genre helped her learn to create likable characters and attractive leading men. In this time, Evanovich also became known for the humor that filled her novels. She believes that "it's very important to take a comic approach. If we can laugh at something, we can face it."

After finishing her twelfth romance, however, Evanovich realized that she was more interested in writing the action sequences in her novels than the sex scenes. Her editors were not interested in her change of heart, so Evanovich took the next eighteen months to formulate a plan for what she actually wanted to write.

=== Stephanie Plum Series ===
She quickly decided that she wanted to write romantic adventure novels. She wanted to include humor, romance and adventure in her work and this fit into her style of mystery novel. Unlike the style of romance novels, her books would be told in first person narrative. Her new type of writing should contain heroes and heroines, as well as "a sense of family and community". In that vein, she intended her new style of writing to be based on the TV sitcom model. Like Seinfeld, her new books would have a central character that the rest of the cast of characters revolve around.

Inspired by the Robert De Niro movie Midnight Run, Evanovich decided that her heroine would be a bounty hunter. This occupation provided more freedom for Evanovich as a writer, as bounty hunters do not have a set work schedule and are not forced to wear a uniform. The profession is also "romanticised to some extent". To become acquainted with the demands of the career, Evanovich spent a great deal of time shadowing bond enforcement agents. She also researched more about the city of Trenton, where she wanted her books to be set.

In 1994, her initial romantic adventure, One for the Money, was published to good reviews. This was the first of a light-hearted series of mysteries starring barely competent bounty hunter Stephanie Plum. One for the Money was named a New York Times notable book, a Publishers Weekly Best Book of 1994 and a USA Today Best Bet.

Evanovich has continued to write romantic adventures starring Plum. The sixth book in the series, Hot Six, was the first of her novels to reach number one on the New York Times Best Seller List. Her subsequent Plum novels have each debuted at number one. All About Romance has described her as the "rare breed of romance author who has left the genre and yet not alienated her many romance fans".

The Plum novels have taken many attributes from Evanovich's own life. Evanovich shares many commonalities with Plum. Both are from New Jersey, both devour Cheetos, both had owned a hamster, and both have shared "similar embarrassing experiences". The character Grandma Mazur is loosely based on Evanovich's Grandma Fanny and Aunt Lena. Evanovich claims the spirited elderly lady is "who I want to be when I grow up".

Shortly before One for the Money was released, Evanovich sold the movie rights to Columbia TriStar for $1 million. Lions Gate Entertainment released One for the Money on January 27, 2012. The film stars Katherine Heigl as Stephanie Plum, Sherri Shepherd from The View as Lula, Debbie Reynolds as Grandma Mazur, Jason O'Mara as Joe Morelli, and Daniel Sunjata as Ranger. It was directed by Julie Anne Robinson.

=== Knight & Moon Series ===
In 2016 Evanovich released the first book, Curious Minds, in her new Knight & Moon mystery series. Co-authored with Phoef Sutton, the book introduces two new characters, Emerson Knight and Riley Moon. Emerson Knight is a rich, eccentric introvert with little-to-no sense of social etiquette. He is also brilliant and handsome. Riley Moon is a recent Harvard Law and Harvard Business graduate. Her aggressive Texas spitfire attitude helped her land her dream job as a junior analyst at Blane-Grunwald where Emerson is a client. Together this unlikely duo finds themselves thrust into solving the most difficult of mysteries.

Dangerous Minds, the second book in the series, was written by Evanovich and released in June 2017.

=== Wicked Series ===
In 2010 Evanovich published Wicked Appetite, spinning off the character Diesel from the between the numbers Plum books. The heroine of Wicked Appetite is sweet cupcake baker Lizzy Tucker, who, unlike Stephanie Plum, can cook. The "Wicked" series is set in Salem, Massachusetts. In the series, Diesel & Lizzy search for the seven stones of power, each representing a different deadly sin. Lizzy & Diesel are "Unmentionables", humans with additional powers. Their rivals for the stones are Diesel's dark cousin, Gerwulf "Wulf" Grimoire, introduced in Plum Spooky and his medieval-esque minion Hatchet. Lizzy's animal companions are one-eyed Cat 7143 and Carl the Monkey, from Fearless Fourteen and Plum Spooky. Her friends include Glo, a "Questionable," and Clara Dazzle, an "Unmentionable" who lost her powers after congress with another "Unmentionable." In Wicked Appetite, the stone sought is that incarnating the sin of gluttony.

In 2012 Evanovich published Wicked Business, the second in the series. In Wicked Business, the stone embodies the sin of lust. A new villain is introduced, deranged candy heiress Deirdre Early, or Anarchy. Lizzy, through a selfless act and exchange of body fluids with Wulf, converts the lust stone into the "icky true love stone", implying that in the right circumstances, the stones of sin can be converted into stones of virtue.

In 2015 Evanovich teamed up with Phoef Sutton for the third novel in the series, Wicked Charms. The Stone of Avarice (Greed) is the focus of this installment.

=== Fox and O'Hare Series ===
In June 2013, Evanovich published the novella "Pros & Cons" and the novel The Heist, the first two works in a new series co-written with Lee Goldberg. Since then the series has grown to six novels (The Heist, The Chase, The Job, The Scam, The Pursuit, and The Big Kahuna), two novellas (Pros & Cons and The Shell Game) and one online short-story, The Caper.

The protagonist is FBI special agent Kate O’Hare who has devoted her career to taking down one of the FBI’s most wanted con men and master thieves, Nick Fox. That is until the FBI pairs Kate with the most unlikely person, Nick Fox, to take down criminals. Together they travel the globe skirting on the edge of what is legal and illegal. Kate’s father, Jake O’Hare, a retired Special Forces operative, often aids in their quest. In June 2016, the fifth novel in the series, The Pursuit, was released.

=== Other novels ===
Evanovich began a collaboration with Charlotte Hughes because she wanted to see some of her other ideas on paper but did not have the time to write them. This resulted in the "Full" series. Set in Beaumont, South Carolina, it features Jamie Swift and Maximillian Holt, who meet in the second "Full" book, Full Tilt.

The Elsie Hawkins novels are standalone romances with supporting character Elsie Hawkins, a gun-toting retiree with tight grey curls who "doesn't take sass from no one". She drives a 1957 powder-blue Cadillac that never seems to sustain damage. In the Plum series, Grandma Mazur and Stephanie drive Uncle Sandor's similarly indestructible 1953 powder-blue Buick.

In 2004, Evanovich launched the "Motor" series with Metro Girl. It debuted at Number 2 on the New York Times Best Seller List. Set in the southern U.S., the series features heroine Alexandra Barnaby, an auto mechanic, and her love interest, Sam Hooker, a hedonistic NASCAR driver. Books in the series include Motor Mouth and the graphic novels Troublemaker 1 & 2.

Evanovich collaborated with the TV writer and producer Stephen J. Cannell (A Team, Rockford Files, Baretta, 21 Jump Street) on No Chance, which was to be the first book in a new series. It was to be released in October 2007, but in July 2007, the book was canceled. Cannell died in 2010 of melanoma.

== Awards and honors ==
Work	Year & Award	Category	Result	Ref.
One for the Money	1995 Dilys Award		Won	
One for the Money	1995 Macavity Awards	Best First Mystery Novel	Finalist	
One for the Money	1995 Crime Writers' Association	New Blood Dagger	Won	
One for the Money	1995 Anthony Awards	Novel	Nominated	
One for the Money	1994 Agatha Award	First Novel	Finalist	
One for the Money	1995 Edgar Allan Poe Award	First Novel	Nominated	
Two for the Dough	1997 Macavity Awards	Mystery Novel	Nominated	
Three to Get Deadly	1998 Dilys Award		Won	
Three to Get Deadly	1998 Lefty Award	Most Humorous Mystery	Won	
Four to Score	1999 Lefty Award	Most Humorous Mystery	Won	
High Five	2000 Anthony Awards	Novel	Nominated	
High Five	2000 Barry Award	Novel	Nominated	
Hot Six	2001 Dilys Award		Nominated	
Eleven on Top	2005 Quill Award	Mystery/Suspense/Thriller	Won	
Twelve Sharp	2006 Quill Award	Mystery/Suspense/Thriller	Won	
Finger Lickin' Fifteen	2010 Goodreads Choice Awards	Mystery & Thriller	Nominated	
Smokin' Seventeen	2011 Goodreads Choice Awards	Mystery & Thriller	Won	
Smokin' Seventeen	2011 Goodreads Choice Awards	Favorite Goodreads Author	Nominated	
Wicked Business	2012 Goodreads Choice Awards	Paranormal Fantasy	Nominated	
Top Secret Twenty-One	2014 Goodreads Choice Awards	Mystery & Thriller	Nominated	
Top Secret Twenty-One	2015 Killer Nashville Awards	Silver Falchion Award (Romantic Suspense)	Finalist	

== Personal life ==
During the week, Evanovich works eight or more hours per day. On weekends she generally works for an additional four hours each day. She generally creates a brief outline before beginning a new book, with one or two sentences about what will happen in each chapter. Upon the release of a new book, Evanovich regularly goes on book tours. Her book signings attracted thousands of people. Beginning with her third Stephanie Plum book, Three to Get Deadly, and ending with Smokin' Seventeen, all of the titles have been chosen from fan submissions.

Evanovich lives in Hawaii and North Carolina with her husband Pete, whom she married in 1964. Her husband, son, and daughter all work for her company, Evanovich Inc. Evanovich's niece by marriage is author Stephanie Evanovich.

== Published Works ==
=== Single romance novels ===
Originally written under the name Steffie Hall

- Hero at Large (1987)
- Thanksgiving (1988)
- The Grand Finale (1988)
- Wife for Hire (1988) - with character Elsie Hawkins
- Foul Play (1989)
- Manhunt (1988)
- Ivan Takes a Wife (1988), then republished as Love Overboard (2005)
- Back to the Bedroom (1989) - with character Elsie Hawkins
- Smitten (1990) - with character Elsie Hawkins
- Rocky Road to Romance (1991) - with character Elsie Hawkins
- Naughty Neighbor (1992)

=== Stephanie Plum Series ===
1. One for the Money (1994)
2. Two for the Dough (1996)
3. Three to Get Deadly (1997)
4. Four to Score (1998)
5. High Five (1999)
6. Hot Six (2000)
7. Seven Up (2001)
8. Hard Eight (2002)
9. To the Nines (2003)
10. Ten Big Ones (2004)
11. Eleven on Top (2005)
12. Twelve Sharp (2006)
13. Lean Mean Thirteen (2007)
14. Fearless Fourteen (2008)
15. Finger Lickin' Fifteen (2009)
16. Sizzling Sixteen (2010)
17. Smokin' Seventeen (2011)
18. Explosive Eighteen (2011)
19. Notorious Nineteen (2012)
20. Takedown Twenty (2013)
21. Top Secret Twenty-One (2014)
22. Tricky Twenty-Two (2015)
23. Turbo Twenty-Three (2016)
24. Hardcore Twenty-Four (2017)
25. Look Alive Twenty-Five (2018)
26. Twisted Twenty-Six (2019)
27. Fortune & Glory Tantalizing Twenty-Seven (2020)
28. Game On: Tempting Twenty-Eight (2021)
29. Going Rogue: Rise and Shine Twenty-Nine (2022)
30. Dirty Thirty (2023)
31. Now or Never: Thirty-One On the Run (2024)
32. Split Second: Thirty-Two Switcheroo (2026)

==== Stephanie Plum and Diesel ====
8.5 Visions of Sugar Plums (2002)
12.5 Plum Lovin' (2007)
13.5 Plum Lucky (2008)
14.5 Plum Spooky (2009)

=== Fox & O'Hare Series ===
0.1 The Caper (2018) co-written with Lee Goldberg
0.2 Pros and Cons (2013) co-written with Lee Goldberg
1 The Heist (2013) co-written with Lee Goldberg
1.1 The Shell Game (2015) co-written with Lee Goldberg
2 The Chase (2014) co-written with Lee Goldberg
3 The Job (2014) co-written with Lee Goldberg
4 The Scam (2015) co-written with Lee Goldberg
5 The Pursuit (2016) co-written with Lee Goldberg
6 The Big Kahuna (2019) co-written with Peter Evanovich
7 The Bounty (2021) co-written with Steve Hamilton

=== Wicked Series ===
1. Wicked Appetite (2010)
2. Wicked Business (2012)
3. Wicked Charms (2015) co-written with Phoef Sutton

=== Knight and Moon Series ===
1. Curious Minds (2016) co-written with Phoef Sutton
2. Dangerous Minds (2017)

=== Barnaby and Hooker Series ===
1. Metro Girl (2004)
2. Motor Mouth (2006)
3. Troublemaker (2007)
4. Troublemaker 2 (2010)

=== Gabriella Rose series ===
1. The Recovery Agent (2022)
2. The King's Ransom (2025)

=== Full Series ===
Co-written with Charlotte Hughes

1. Full House (2002)
2. Full Tilt (2003)
3. Full Speed (2003)
4. Full Blast (2004)
5. Full Bloom (2005)
6. Full Scoop (2006)

=== Co-authored romance novels ===
- Hot Stuff (2007) co-written with Leanne Banks
- Love in a Nutshell (2012) co-written with Dorien Kelly
- The Husband List (2013) co-written with Dorien Kelly

=== Anthologies ===
- The Plot Thickens
- The Last Peep

=== Non-fiction ===
- How I Write (2006)
