= To the Nines (novel) =

2003 novel by Janet Evanovich

- First edition cover
- Author: Janet Evanovich
- Language: English
- Series: Stephanie Plum
- Genre: Crime novel
- Publisher: St. Martin's Press
- Publication date: July 15, 2003
- Publication place: United States
- Media type: Print (Hardback & Paperback)
- Pages: 320 pp (first edition, hardback)
- ISBN: 0-312-26586-7 (first edition, hardback)
- OCLC: 51766254
- Dewey Decimal: 813/.54 21
- LC Class: PS3555.V2126 T6 2003b
- Preceded by: Hard Eight
- Followed by: Ten Big Ones

To the Nines is the ninth novel by Janet Evanovich featuring the bounty hunter Stephanie Plum. Written in 2003, it's the second book in a row that doesn't revolve around a criminal bond, and the first to take Stephanie out of New Jersey and into the neon glitz of Las Vegas.

To the Nines appeared on the USA Today list of 150 best-selling novels for 17 weeks, peaking at number 2.

== Plot introduction ==
Stephanie Plum is a bounty hunter and amateur detective, who with a combination of luck and intuition usually gets the job done (though often by accident). She's got all the normal concerns in life: the rent, her family, men; yet all of her concerns are topped by the minor fact that someone is usually trying to kill her.

=== Explanation of the novel's title ===
The title appears to come from the common phrase, 'dressed to the nines'.

== Plot summary ==
Stephanie's cousin and boss, Vinnie, has written the visa bond for Samuel Singh, an Indian immigrant working temporarily in New Jersey. Now he has gone missing, and his landlord, Mrs. Apusenja, insists that Vinnie track him down. She claims Singh is engaged to her daughter, Nonnie, but Nonnie appears more concerned for her dog, "Boo," who went missing at the same time.

Partnered with Ranger, Stephanie begins with TriBro, Singh's workplace, owned by three brothers, Andrew, Bart and Clyde Cone. While Andrew is helpful and Clyde is very enthusiastic about the case, Bart Cone gives Stephanie the creeps. Her boyfriend, Joe Morelli, does a background check and finds that Bart Cone was a suspect in the unsolved murder of a woman named Lillian Paressi. Circumstantial evidence tied him to the crime scene, but the indictment was dismissed when the DNA evidence proved negative.

After returning home from TriBro, Stephanie is unnerved to find a bouquet of white carnations and red roses, accompanied by photographs of a murdered woman. She also receives some rather creepy emails.

Based on the Apusenjas' description of his habits, Stephanie identifies Singh's only friend, an Indian man named Howie that works at a nearby McDonald's. While she is questioning him outside the restaurant, a passing motorist shoots him between the eyes.

Stephanie only gets more nervous when she questions Lillian Paressi's friend, who remembers that Lillian also received a bouquet of carnations and roses.

Andrew Cone excitedly calls Stephanie to tell her that Singh has applied for a job in Las Vegas, and his prospective employer called TriBro for a reference. Stephanie sets out for Vegas, accompanied by her sidekick Lula and Vinnie's secretary, Connie Rossoli. They rescue Boo from the home of a woman Singh was living with, but Stephanie gets a call from Morelli, who was informed by the Vegas police that Singh's body was found in a car at the airport, shot execution style. Afraid that the "Roses and Carnations Killer" has followed them to Nevada, Stephanie and Connie quickly return to New Jersey; Lula, afraid to fly again, decides to drive cross-country with Boo for company.

Drafted to attend a birthday dinner for Morelli's uncle, Stephanie is even more unnerved when Morelli's spooky Grandma Bella claims to have "visions" of Morelli being married with many children, but losing his wife to a violent death.

Ranger assigns his security company's employees to keep Stephanie safe, but two of them are badly injured while following her around: Tank, Ranger's right-hand man, suffers a broken leg when a fugitive jumps out his window and lands on him; later, when Stephanie's pregnant sister Valerie goes into labor, her water breaks over the second man, Cal, who faints dead away and suffers a concussion hitting his head on the floor. Stephanie's new niece, her older sister Valerie's daughter with Albert Kloughn, is born. She is named Lisa.

Stepping outside the hospital to get some air, Stephanie is accosted by a teenager with a gun, who calls himself "Fisher Cat" and tells her she is the prize of a "game" - the winner is the one who succeeds in killing her. Stephanie disarms Fisher Cat with a groin kick, but is knocked unconscious by his stun gun. When she regains consciousness, Fisher Cat is dead beside her, shot twice through the head. Morelli examines Fisher Cat's laptop and finds that the game is run through an online chat room, by "The Webmaster."

Unwilling to let go of her suspicion that Bart Cone is the Roses and Carnations Killer, Stephanie goes back to the TriBro factory to confront him, only to discover that the Webmaster is the youngest brother, Clyde (his "Webmaster" appellation has less to do with his online role in masterminding the game than with his lifelong passion for Spider-Man comics). Clyde killed Lillian Paressi, which is why Bart was circumstantially linked to the crime, but the DNA evidence was inconclusive. Clyde also killed Howie, Samuel Singh, and Fisher Cat. He has also kidnapped Lula and Albert and wired them to a bomb in another part of the factory. Still playing his "game", Clyde draws a gun and stalks Stephanie through the factory floor, but Stephanie manages to find a gun concealed in Bart's desk and return fire, killing Clyde. Ranger and Morelli arrive and defuse the bomb, freeing Lula and Albert.

After spending the night with Morelli, Stephanie is greeted the following morning by his mother and Grandma Bella, who admits that the woman in her vision was someone else's wife, but "maybe she was just sleeping."

== Characters in To the Nines ==
- Stephanie Plum – detective and protagonist
- Lula – Stephanie's partner who is on the Atkins diet
- Vinnie – Plum's cousin and boss
- Samuel Singh – a bondee who is on the run
- Andrew, Bart and Clyde Cone – Brothers, owners of TriBro, Singh's workplace
- Mrs Apusenja – Singh's landlord
- Nonnie Apusenja – Daughter of Mrs Apusenja and engaged to Singh

== Trivia ==
- This is only the second time Stephanie has killed someone with a gun, after Jimmy Alpha in One for the Money. Both shootings were self-defense.
