= Joe Theismann =

American football player and broadcaster (born 1949)

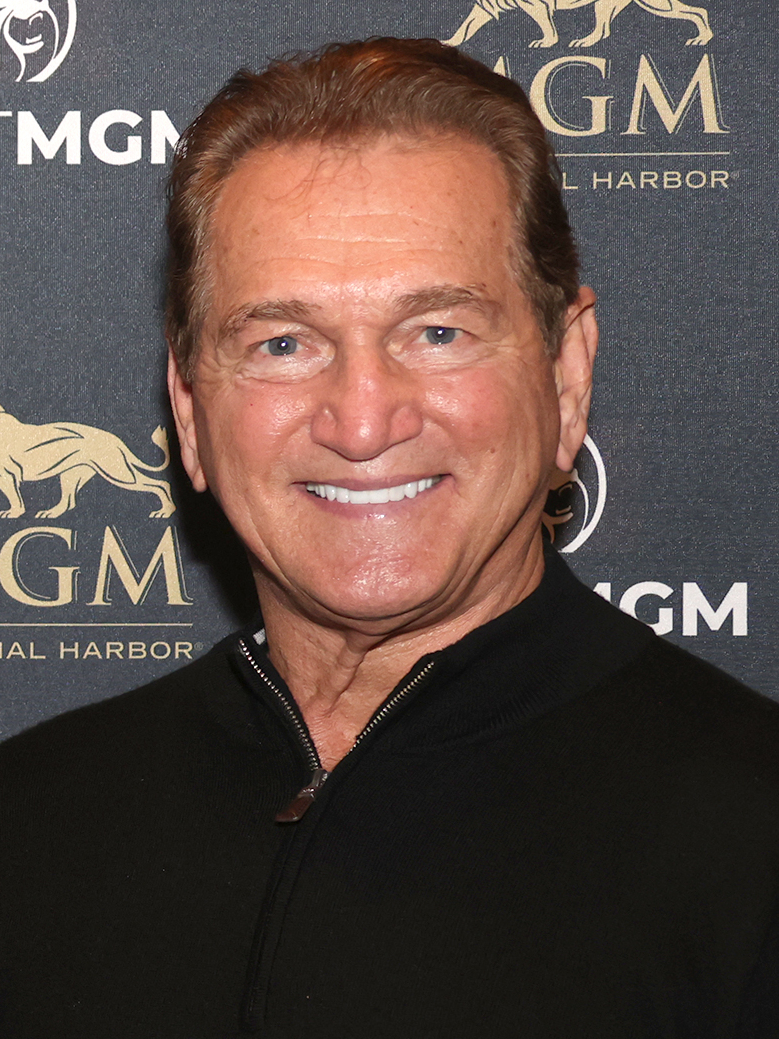
- Theismann in 2021

No. 7
- Position: Quarterback

Personal information
- Born: September 9, 1949 (age 77); New Brunswick, New Jersey, U.S.
- Listed height: 6 ft 0 in (1.83 m)
- Listed weight: 192 lb (87 kg)

Career information
- High school: South River (South River, New Jersey)
- College: Notre Dame (1967–1970)
- NFL draft: 1971: 4th round, 99th overall pick

Career history
- Toronto Argonauts (1971–1973); Washington Redskins (1974–1985)

Awards and highlights
- Super Bowl champion (XVII); NFL Most Valuable Player (1983); NFL Offensive Player of the Year (1983); NFL Man of the Year (1982); First-team All-Pro (1983); 2× Pro Bowl (1982, 1983); Bert Bell Award (1982); Washington Commanders 90 Greatest; Washington Redskins Ring of Fame; 2× CFL All-Star (1971, 1973); First-team All-American (1970)

Career NFL statistics
- Passing attempts: 3,602
- Passing completions: 2,044
- Completion percentage: 56.7%
- TD–INT: 160–138
- Passing yards: 25,206
- Passer rating: 77.4
- Rushing yards: 1,815
- Rushing touchdowns: 17
- Stats at Pro Football Reference

Career CFL statistics
- TD–INT: 40–47
- Passing yards: 6,093
- Passer rating: 77.2
- College Football Hall of Fame

Joseph Robert Theismann (/ˈθaɪzmən/; born September 9, 1949) is an American former professional football player, sports commentator, corporate speaker, and restaurateur. He rose to fame playing quarterback in the National Football League (NFL) and Canadian Football League (CFL). Theismann spent 12 seasons with the Washington Redskins, where he was a two-time Pro Bowler and led the team to consecutive Super Bowl appearances, winning Super Bowl XVII over the Miami Dolphins and losing Super Bowl XVIII to the Los Angeles Raiders. He played college football for the Notre Dame Fighting Irish and was inducted into the College Football Hall of Fame in 2003.

During the Redskins' 11th game of the 1985 NFL season, Theismann suffered a career-ending leg injury, forcing him to retire. Theismann worked as a sportscaster and an analyst on pro football broadcasts with ESPN for nearly 20 years. He primarily partnered with Mike Patrick, for the network's Sunday Night Football package and for one season of Monday Night Football with Mike Tirico and Tony Kornheiser. Theismann also worked as a color analyst on NFL Network's Thursday Night Football package with play-by-play voice Bob Papa and Matt Millen. Theismann also co-hosts the network's weekly show Playbook. Since 2011, he has worked on the Washington Commanders preseason television broadcast team. Theismann also works on the NFL Network on a variety of programs, primarily as an analyst.

== Early life ==
Theismann was born to Austrian Joseph John Theismann who "ran a gas station and worked in his brother's liquor store." His Hungarian mother, Olga Tóbiás, worked for Johnson & Johnson until her retirement. Theismann was raised in South River, New Jersey, and attended South River High School, where he lettered in baseball, basketball, and football.

He was a high school teammate of Drew Pearson. Theismann accepted a college football scholarship to attend the University of Notre Dame, where he lived in Zahm Hall.

== College career ==
At Notre Dame, Theismann became the starting quarterback in his sophomore year after Terry Hanratty was injured late in the season.

In the three remaining games in the regular season, he led the Irish to two wins and a tie. In 1969, Theismann led the Irish to a number five ranking, but lost to the University of Texas in the 1970 Cotton Bowl Classic, 21–17. The next year, the Irish had a 10–1 record, a number two ranking, and won against Texas in the 1971 Cotton Bowl Classic, 24–11.

That year, Theismann was an All-American and an Academic All-American and was in contention for the Heisman Trophy, but he finished second to Jim Plunkett of Stanford University. Theismann, whose last name was actually pronounced THEES-mann, later recalled that Notre Dame Sports Information Director Roger Valdiserri insisted that he change the pronunciation of his name to rhyme with "Heisman", although in the process, Theismann learned from his grandmother that the original pronunciation of his last name was TICE-mann.

Theismann set school records for passing yards in a season (2,429) and touchdowns in a season (16). He also set a school record for passing yards in a game (526) and completions in a game (33) while playing against the University of Southern California in a torrential downpour in 1970, which the Irish lost 38–28. As a starting quarterback, Theismann compiled a 20–3–2 record while throwing for 4,411 yards and 31 touchdowns. His 4,411 passing yards rank fifth on Notre Dame's career passing list.

Theismann was inducted into the College Football Hall of Fame in 2003. He was the eighth Notre Dame quarterback enshrined into the hall, joining former Heisman Trophy winners Angelo Bertelli, John Lujack, and Paul Hornung.

== Professional career ==
=== Toronto Argonauts ===
Theismann was selected 99th overall in the fourth round of the 1971 NFL draft by the Miami Dolphins and in the 39th round of the 1971 Major League Baseball draft by the Minnesota Twins. After prolonged negotiations with the Dolphins failed, Theismann elected to sign with the Toronto Argonauts of the Canadian Football League for $50,000 per season.

In his rookie year, Theismann quarterbacked the Argonauts to a 10–4 record, led the league's Eastern Conference in passing statistics, and won a berth in the Grey Cup game against the Calgary Stampeders in Vancouver, British Columbia (59th Grey Cup). A fumble late in the fourth quarter by Argonaut running back Leon McQuay close to the goal line cost the Argonauts what would have been their first Grey Cup victory since 1952.

In 1971, Theismann completed 148 of 278 passes for 2,440 yards, 17 touchdowns, and 21 interceptions. His 1972 season was shortened by injury, but he completed 77 of 127 passes for 1,157 yards and ten touchdowns. During his last CFL season in 1973, he completed 157 of 274 passes for 2,496 yards and 13 touchdowns and the same number of interceptions. Theismann was an all-star in both 1971 and 1973.

=== Washington Redskins ===
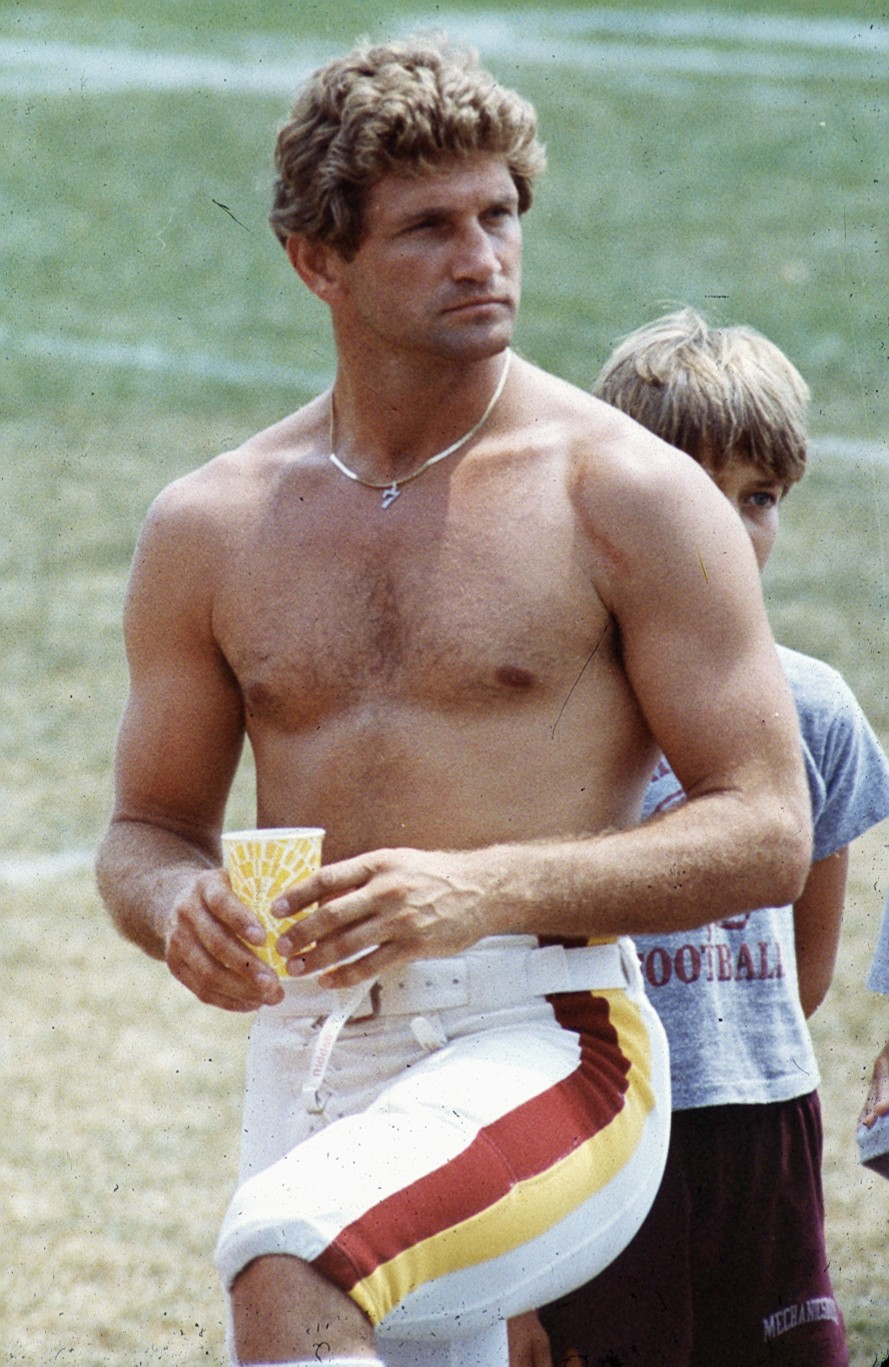
Theismann at practice

In 1974, the Washington Redskins obtained Theismann's rights from the Dolphins in exchange for the team's first-round draft pick in 1976 (the Dolphins selected linebacker Larry Gordon with the pick). Theismann left the CFL and joined the Redskins, where he served as the team's punt returner during his first season. In 1978, Theismann became the Redskins' starting quarterback, succeeding Billy Kilmer.

In 1982, Theismann led the Redskins to their first championship in 40 years against the Dolphins in Super Bowl XVII. He threw two touchdowns and with the Redskins trailing 17–13 in the third quarter made arguably the most important defensive play of the game. After his pass was deflected by Dolphins lineman Kim Bokamper, causing what appeared to be an interception and sure touchdown that would have given Miami a two-score lead and effectively taken MVP running back John Riggins out of the game, Theismann himself was able to knock the ball out of Bokamper's hands to have it result in an incompletion rather than a catch. Later on, Washington ran their way to victory. He also led the team to an appearance in Super Bowl XVIII the following year and would go on to set several Redskins franchise records, including most career passing attempts (3,602), most career passing completions (2,044) and most career passing yards (25,206), while also throwing 160 touchdown passes, with 138 interceptions. On the ground, he rushed for 1,815 yards and 17 touchdowns. He was named NFL MVP in 1983 by four organizations. He earned the Player of the Game Award in the second of his two Pro Bowl appearances. Theismann also punted once in his career, for one yard against the Chicago Bears.

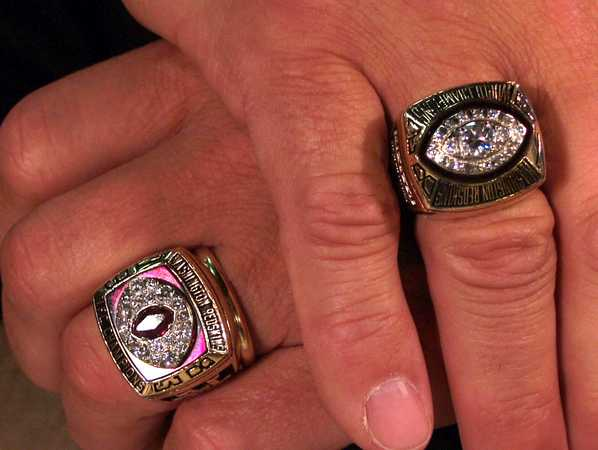
Joe Theismann's NFL rings; his 1983 NFC Championship ring (left), and his 1982 Super Bowl XVII Championship ring (right)

In an era when most quarterbacks had long since used variations of a double-bar facemask or "cage" facemasks that afforded more protection, Theismann stood out in his use of a signature one-bar face mask throughout his pro career.

However, on at least one occasion, Theismann wore a helmet with a more standard facemask. Substituting for an ineffective Billy Kilmer against the Dallas Cowboys on October 16, 1977, Theismann entered the game wearing a facemask similar to the style worn by Ken Stabler at the time.

==== Career-ending injury ====
On November 18, 1985, Theismann suffered a comminuted compound fracture of the tibia and fibula in his right leg when he was sacked by linebackers Lawrence Taylor and Harry Carson. The injury took place during a Monday Night Football game against the New York Giants telecast by ABC from RFK Stadium in Washington, DC.

The injury was later voted the NFL's "Most Shocking Moment in History" by viewers in an ESPN poll, and the tackle was ultimately dubbed "The Hit That No One Who Saw It Can Ever Forget" by The Washington Post.

The game's score was 7–7 in the second quarter when the Redskins attempted to run a "flea-flicker" play; Theismann handed the ball off to fullback John Riggins, who subsequently lateralled the ball back to the quarterback. The Giants' defense, however, was tightly focused, and they tried to blitz Theismann. As Taylor pulled Theismann down, Taylor's knee came down and drove straight into Theismann's lower right leg, fracturing both the tibia and the fibula as Giants linebackers Gary Reasons and Harry Carson also joined Taylor in the sack. Theismann would later describe the incident (December 22, 2005):

The pain was unbelievable, but it didn't last more than a second or two. My leg snapped like a breadstick. I heard it clearly, it sounded like two muzzled gunshots over my left shoulder. Pow, pow! ... It was at that point, I also found out what a magnificent machine the human body is. Almost immediately, from the knee down, all the feeling was gone in my right leg. The endorphins had kicked in, and I was not in any great pain.

As Theismann was down, Taylor immediately popped to his feet and began frantically waving, before looking back and seeing Theismann sprawled on the ground. Initially, many Redskins personnel thought Taylor was taunting after the play before quickly realizing that Theismann was seriously injured, but it was later confirmed that Taylor knew immediately that something had happened and was trying to signal for help from the emergency medical technicians, something the Monday Night Football announcer team of Frank Gifford, O. J. Simpson, and Joe Namath had correctly inferred from the start.

While initially only the players on the field could see the extent of the damage to Theismann's leg, the reverse-angle instant replay provided a clearer view of what had actually happened: Theismann's lower leg bones were broken midway between his knee and his ankle, such that his leg from his foot to his mid-shin was lying flat against the ground while the upper part of his shin up to his knee was at a 45-degree angle to the lower part of his leg. ABC's decision to screen the reverse-angle instant replay several times despite its palpably graphic content shocked millions of viewers, with some describing it as "the most horrific professional sports injury of all time"; the repeated screening of this replay remains one of the most controversial in-game television production decisions in NFL history. As the replays were shown, Gifford repeatedly urged viewers at home to exercise discretion: "If your stomach is weak, just don't watch."

The compound fracture of the tibia and fibula led to insufficient bone growth during Theismann's recovery, leaving his right leg shorter than his left. As a result, the injury ended Theismann's career, forcing him to retire at the age of 36. While Theismann has clarified that Taylor apologized to him many times for the incident, he also stated that he never blamed Taylor, reiterating that he was merely doing his job.

Theismann's injury was highlighted in the film The Blind Side as the reason that, after the quarterback, one of the highest paid football players is the left tackle, who protects a right-handed quarterback's blind side. A very similar injury occurred exactly 33 years later to another Redskins quarterback, Alex Smith, on November 18, 2018, in a game against the Houston Texans when cornerback Kareem Jackson and defensive end J. J. Watt sacked Smith, a game that Theismann himself was attending. However, unlike Theismann, Smith managed to play an additional season two years later in 2020 and won the Comeback Player of the Year award before retiring in 2021.

== Career statistics ==
=== NFL ===
Legend
	AP NFL MVP & OPOTY
	Won the Super Bowl
**Bold**	Career high

==== Regular season ====
Year	Team	Games			Passing									Rushing				
Year	Team	GP	GS	Record	Cmp	Att	Pct	Yds	Avg	Lng	TD	Int	Rtg	Att	Yds	Avg	Lng	TD
1974	WAS	9	0	–	9	11	81.8	145	13.2	69	1	0	149.1	3	12	4.0	12	1
1975	WAS	14	0	–	10	22	45.5	96	4.4	30	1	3	33.7	3	34	**11.3**	21	0
1976	WAS	14	5	3–2	79	163	48.5	1,036	6.4	44	8	10	59.8	17	97	5.7	22	1
1977	WAS	14	6	4–2	84	182	46.2	1,097	6.0	52	7	9	57.9	29	149	5.1	14	1
1978	WAS	**16**	14	7–7	187	390	47.9	2,593	6.6	63	13	18	61.6	37	177	4.8	20	1
1979	WAS	**16**	**16**	10–6	233	395	59.0	2,797	7.1	62	20	13	83.9	46	181	3.9	22	**4**
1980	WAS	**16**	15	6–9	262	454	57.7	2,962	6.5	54	17	16	75.2	29	175	6.0	**37**	3
1981	WAS	**16**	**16**	8–8	**293**	**496**	59.1	3,568	7.2	79	19	**20**	77.3	36	177	4.9	24	2
1982	WAS	9	9	8–1	161	252	**63.9**	2,033	**8.1**	78	13	9	91.3	31	150	4.8	16	0
1983	WAS	**16**	**16**	**14–2**	276	459	60.1	**3,714**	**8.1**	**84**	**29**	11	**97.0**	37	234	6.3	22	1
1984	WAS	**16**	**16**	11–5	283	477	59.3	3,391	7.1	80	24	13	86.6	**62**	**314**	5.1	27	1
1985	WAS	11	11	6–5	167	301	55.5	1,774	5.9	55	8	16	59.6	25	115	4.6	25	2
Career		167	124	77–47	2,044	3,602	56.7	25,206	7.0	84	160	138	77.4	355	1,815	5.1	37	17

==== Postseason ====
Year	Team	Games			Passing									Rushing				
Year	Team	GP	GS	Record	Cmp	Att	Pct	Yds	Avg	Lng	TD	Int	Rtg	Att	Yds	Avg	Lng	TD
1974	WAS	1	0	—	0	0	0.0	0	0.0	0	0	0	0	0	0	0.0	0	0
1976	WAS	1	0	—	0	0	0.0	0	0.0	0	0	0	0	0	0	0.0	0	0
1982	WAS	4	4	**4—0**	**58**	**85**	**68.2**	716	8.4	46	**8**	3	**110.7**	**9**	27	3.0	12	0
1983	WAS	3	3	2—1	48	84	57.1	**774**	**9.2**	**70**	3	3	85.1	5	30	6.0	8	0
1984	WAS	1	1	0—1	22	42	52.4	292	7.0	35	0	1	64.8	5	**38**	**7.6**	**13**	0
Career		10	8	6—2	128	211	60.7	1,782	8.4	70	11	7	91.4	19	95	5.0	13	0

==== Super Bowl ====
Year	SB	Team	Opp.	Passing								Rushing				Result
Year	SB	Team	Opp.	Cmp	Att	Pct	Yds	Y/A	TD	Int	Rtg	Att	Yds	Y/A	TD	Result
1982	XVII	WAS	MIA	15	23	**65.2**	143	6.2	**2**	**2**	**75.1**	**3**	**20**	**6.7**	0	**W** 27–17
1983	XVIII	WAS	RAI	**16**	**35**	45.7	**243**	**6.9**	0	**2**	45.3	**3**	18	6.0	0	L 38–9
				31	58	53.4	386	6.7	2	4	57.1	6	38	6.3	0	W−L 1–1

=== CFL ===
Year	Team	GP	Passing								Rushing			
Year	Team	GP	Cmp	Att	Pct	Yds	Avg	TD	Int	Rtg	Att	Yds	Avg	TD
1971	TOR	14	148	278	53.2	2,440	8.8	17	21	71.9	81	564	7.0	1
1972	TOR	6	77	127	60.6	1,157	9.1	10	13	77.2	21	147	7.0	1
1973	TOR	14	157	274	57.3	2,496	9.1	13	13	83.8	70	343	4.9	1
Career		34	382	679	56.3	6,093	9.0	40	47	77.2	172	1,054	6.1	3

== Career highlights ==
=== Awards and honors ===
NFL

- Super Bowl champion (XVII)
- NFL Most Valuable Player (1983)
- NFL Offensive Player of the Year (1983)
- NFL Man of the Year (1982)
- First-team All-Pro (1983)
- 2× Pro Bowl (1982, 1983)
- Pro Bowl MVP (1983)
- Bert Bell Award (1982)
- Washington Commanders 90 Greatest
- Washington Redskins Ring of Fame

CFL

- 2× CFL All-Star (1971, 1973)

College

- First-team All-American (1970)
- College Football Hall of Fame (2003)

=== Washington Redskins franchise records ===
- Most career wins by a quarterback (87)
- Most career passing yards (25,206)
- Most career passing completions (2,044)
- Most career passing attempts (3,602)

== Broadcast and acting career ==
In 1985, Theismann helped call Super Bowl XIX for ABC alongside Frank Gifford and Don Meredith, becoming only the second player to do commentary on a Super Bowl telecast while still an active player at the time (the first was Jack Kemp when he helped call Super Bowl II for CBS). Theismann served as a color commentator on regional CBS NFL coverage in 1986 and 1987, then worked on ESPN's Sunday Night Football telecasts from 1988 to 2005, and on their Monday Night Football coverage in 2006.

In addition to covering football, Theismann hosted the first half of the first season of American Gladiators in 1989.

On March 26, 2007, ESPN announced that Ron Jaworski would replace Theismann in the Monday Night Football booth. Theismann rejected an offer to work on the network's college football coverage. He has since done a number of Washington Redskins pre-season games on CSN. On September 16, 2009, the NFL Network announced that Theismann would analyze game films on the show Playbook, airing Thursday and Friday nights at 6 p.m. Eastern.

On January 9, 2010, Theismann and his former head coach Joe Gibbs served as color commentators, along with play-by-play man Tom Hammond, for the Saturday AFC wild card game between the New York Jets and the Cincinnati Bengals.

On September 6, 2010, NFL Network announced that they added Theismann to their Thursday Night Football broadcast crew alongside Bob Papa and Matt Millen. The grouping lasted one season. He also co-hosted NFL games on NBC in 2010, and co-hosted NFL Network's No Huddle in 2011.

=== Acting appearances ===
Theismann has occasionally acted, although most appearances are as himself or as himself in a fictional context. He does have several TV and movie appearances, including B.J. and the Bear (1981), Cannonball Run II (1984), and The Man from Left Field (1993).

Theismann appeared as himself, as part of a buyer group for the fictional "New York Hawks" football team on the TV series Necessary Roughness (2013) and on the post-Super Bowl episode "Operation: Broken Feather" of Brooklyn Nine-Nine (2014). His most recent acting appearances were in movies for the Hallmark Channel. In 2016's Love on the Sidelines, he appeared as the father of an injured professional football player. In 2019's SnowComing, he played an agent for professional athletes (in particular, a professional football player).

== Legacy ==
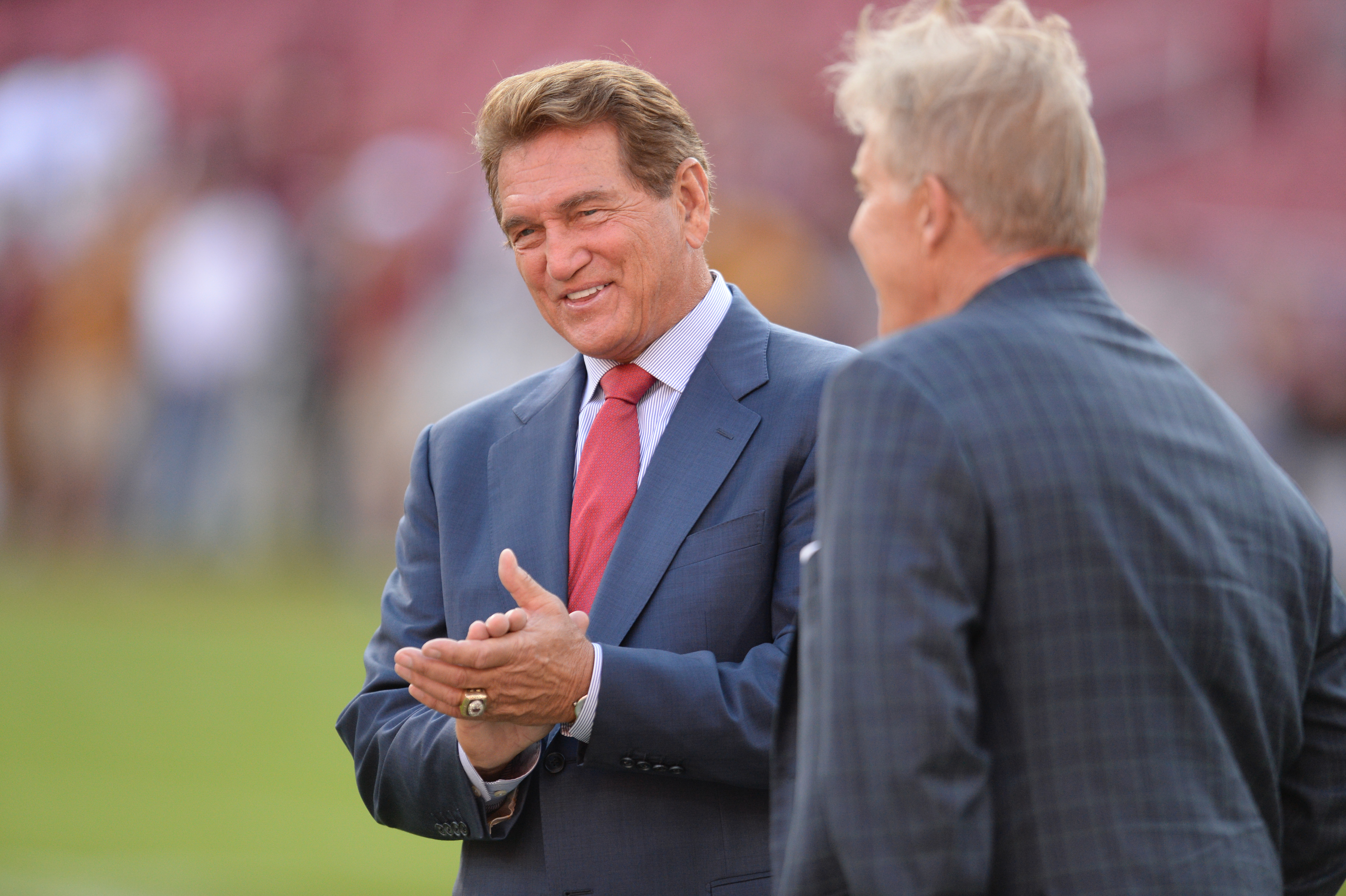
Theismann with John Elway in 2018

Theismann received the Golden Plate Award of the American Academy of Achievement presented by Awards Council member Tom Landry in 1983.

Theismann was inducted into the New Jersey State Interscholastic Athletic Association Hall of Fame in 1997. He was inducted into the College Football Hall of Fame in 2003.

In 2011, Theismann was inducted into the New Jersey Hall of Fame.

On September 5, 2014, Theismann was honored by the Ride of Fame as they christened a double decker sightseeing bus in Washington, DC, dedicated to him and his achievements.

== Personal life ==
Theismann and his first wife, the former Shari Brown, had three children: Joseph Jr., Amy, and Patrick. The couple divorced in April 1985, seven months before Theismann's injury. Theismann was engaged to television personality Cathy Lee Crosby in September 1985, and their relationship lasted until December 1990 when he filed suit against her. In January 1991, Crosby countersued for $4.5 million. The suits were settled privately in June.

His second marriage, to former Miss Connecticut winner and Miss America contestant Jeanne Caruso, ended in divorce after three years in 1995. Theismann was ordered to pay nearly $1 million of marital property and $3,500 a month in alimony. In 1996, Theismann married Robin Smith. They have homes in Virginia, Tennessee, and the Florida Panhandle.

In 1975, he founded Theismann's Restaurant and Bar in Bailey's Crossroads, Virginia, later expanding to a chain of five restaurants in the DC-Baltimore area. As of 2015 the restaurant has a single location in Alexandria, Virginia.

In October 2010, the UFL's Florida Tuskers had a portion of their franchise bought by Theismann. Theismann expressed disappointment at the way he was treated during his time in the league and left the team when it was folded into the Virginia Destroyers in January 2011.

Media offices
Preceded by None	Super Bowl television color commentator (prime-time package carrier); 1984 (with Don Meredith)	Succeeded by Frank Gifford and Dan Dierdorf
