= Russell Zavistovich =

Belarusian-American community leader

Russel Rascislav Zavistovich
- Расьціслаў Завістовіч
- Born: June 2, 1928; Wilno, Poland
- Died: December 20, 2000 (aged 72)
- Citizenship: United States
- Education: Rutgers University
- Organization: Belarusian Congress Committee of America
- Spouse: Iraida Zavistovich
- Father: Michas Zavistovič

Russell Rascislav Zavistovich (Note: Belarusian: Расціслаў Завістовіч, romanized: Rastsislaw Zavistovich, polonized: Raścisłaŭ Zavistovič) (June 2, 1928 – December 20, 2000) was one of the leaders of the Belarusian American community in 1990–2000.

== Biography ==
=== Early life ===
Zavistovich was born in Wilno, then part of the Second Polish Republic, into a Belarusian family. In 1944 he left Belarus with his parents. After several years in displaced persons camps, in 1948 the family moved to the United States and settled in South River, New Jersey.

=== Career ===
In the early 1950s he was drafted in the US Army and served in Germany in the 313th Military Intelligence Service Platoon After demobilization, Zavistovich returned to the United States and studied at Rutgers University in New Jersey, graduating with a degree in electronics engineering.

From the mid-1970s until 1986 Zavistovich worked as a civilian with the support center of the Office of Naval Intelligence in Suitland, responsible for translating Soviet documents of naval significance.

=== As the leader of the Belarusian community ===
Since 1990, Russell Zavistovich served as president of the Belarusian Congress Committee of America, a political action group of the Belarusian diaspora in the United States. He attended White House meetings on the Belarusian issues, held correspondence with President Bill Clinton and assisted the newly established embassy of the independent Republic of Belarus in Washington, D.C.

After President Aliaksandr Lukashenka established his authoritarian regime in Belarus, Zavistovich actively criticized him in a number of articles.

Zavistovich served as an honorary member of the host committee for the NATO 50th anniversary summit.

== Family ==
Russell Zavistovich was married to Iraida Zavistovich and had two children.

== Other ==
Zavistovich is the author of a Belarusian translation of Belovezhskaya pushcha, a popular Soviet song by Nikolai Dobronravov and Aleksandra Pakhmutova, performed by the Belarusian Soviet rock band Pesniary. The Belarusian version was recorded by Bohdan "Danchyk" Andrusyshyn, a widely-popular singer from the Belarusian diaspora.

== See also ==
- Belarusan-American Association
- Rada BNR
