= Wicked Appetite =

- First edition (publ. St. Martin's Press)
- Author: Janet Evanovich
- Language: English
- Publisher: St. Martin's Press
- Publication date: 2010
- Dewey Decimal: 813.54
- LC Class: PS3555.V2126 W53

Wicked Appetite is a 2010 novel by Janet Evanovich set in Salem, Massachusetts. Elizabeth Tucker (referred to as Lizzie) is a baker at Dazzle's Bakery, specialising in cupcakes. Lizzie has recently moved to Salem after inheriting her aunt's house. Diesel (from Visions of Sugar Plums, Plum Lovin', Plum Spooky, and Plum Lucky, the "Between The Numbers" Stephanie Plum holiday novellas) appears out of thin air in Dazzle's Bakery after Lizzie has been accosted by Gerwulf Grimoire, otherwise known as Wulf (from Plum Spooky).

Unbeknownst to her, Lizzie is an Unmentionable, with a special talent for finding things that Diesel needs. A Stone of Power has re-surfaced and Diesel needs to get to it before Wulf does. The Seven Stones of Power reflect each of the Seven Deadly Sins, the stone in this book dedicated to the sin of gluttony. The stones are known by the acronym SALIGIA, from the Latin names for the sins: superbia, avaritia, luxuria, invidia, gula, ira, & acedia, or pride, greed, lust, envy, gluttony, anger, & sloth.

Lizzie's co-worker Glo, not an Unmentionable but a Questionable, tries out a number of spells with unusual results. Lizzie adopts an odd orange one-eyed cat, who possibly belonged to her deceased Aunt Ophelia, and Carl, the monkey with an attitude problem, rides along. Carl the monkey was introduced in Fearless Fourteen humping Brenda's hair, and was featured in Plum Spooky.

A sequel, titled Wicked Business, was released on June 19, 2012.
