= Jonathan Janson (painter) =

American painter and art historian

Jonathan Janson (born November 10, 1950) is an American painter and art historian.

== Biography ==
Born in South River, New Jersey and raised in upstate New York and Florida, Janson graduated from the Rhode Island School of Design (Providence, Rhode Island) in 1972 with a major in painting. The turning point in his studies came when in 1969 he visited the Isabella Stewart Gardner Museum in Boston, Mass., where he saw Johannes Vermeer’s "Concert." This small but perfect masterpiece left a profound impression on the emergent painter decisively orienting his artistic direction. In his senior year at R.I.S.D. he studied in Rome, Italy, having been selected for the European Honors Program at Palazzo Cenci.

After a brief return to his home in Florida, Janson returned to Rome (where he continues to live and work until today) to deepen his studies of 17th-century European painting and establish his family. In this period of creative incubation, Janson came to grips with the complexities of organizing detailed, multi-layered figurative painting.

Janson put together a group of small, tightly composed interior paintings and suburban landscapes manifestly inspired by Vermeer in which the artist updated the Dutch painter's motifs of contemporary life. A Roman art dealer organized Janson's first solo show in 1980 which introduced his work to the Italian art public. Shortly after, he began showing with the influential Galleria Forni, Bologna which exposed his work to an international audience. Janson continued to refine his technique while exploring the cultural continuum of Dutch genre themes such as reading, writing, family life and music making.

In 1983, after a summer sojourn in his native Florida, Janson painted a series of minimalist watercolors inspired by the harsh, semitropical environment of the suburban Florida landscape. The most characteristic motifs of this series are devoid of human presence, which, however, is incessantly signaled by cars moving along highways or parked quietly in anonymous strip-mall parking lots or gas stations. These small scenes are characterized by intense backlighting which frames the voids and unnoticed events of America's daily life. The artist's deft touch and two or three color palette draws inspiration from the topographical studies of William Turner and the New England watercolors of Edward Hopper.

In 1984 Janson presented a group of the Florida watercolors in a solo-exhibition at the historical photo-realist O.K. Harris Gallery, New York. In the years which follow, he took part in more than 50 group and 30 solo exhibitions until the most recent in late 2009, a solo-exhibition of Seattle and Florida suburban landscapes unified by a mute gray palette and severe weather conditions. Janson continues to work alternately in the two parallel modes of painting: landscape watercolors and interior oil paintings.

== Internet ==
Responding to the internet medium, Janson created a website called Essential Vermeer in 2001. Essential Vermeer has developed into the primary internet resource for Vermeer studies and the most comprehensive website dedicated to a single painter. Essential Vermeer presents a balanced in-depth study of the life, art and cultural milieu of Johannes Vermeer comprising hundreds of web pages, thousands of images, collaborative studies, interviews with Vermeer notables and multi-media features. The site includes a complete interactive catalogue of the Dutch artist which permits the navigator to access extensive information on each work using images mapping and expandable topic boxes. Janson issues a free newsletter which keeps thousands of subscribers informed about Vermeer-related exhibitions, publications and multi-media events.

Janson's commitment has brought the Essential Vermeer to the attention of art historians and specialists in 17th-century Dutch art as well as writers who use it regularly as a reference point. He travels extensively and is in constant contact with museum personnel and art historians involved with Dutch genre painting and specifically with the work of Vermeer.

== Television and documentary film ==
In 2002, Janson was commissioned by the American Hallmark Hall of Fame to paint a hypothetical Vermeer for the television adaptation Brush with Fate, based on Susan Vreeland's best-selling novel Girl in Hyacinth Blue. It was broadcast on CBS a year after.

In 2009, Janson is featured in a documentary Views on Vermeer: 12 Short Stories by Hans Pool and Koos de Wilt. The film presents influential contemporary painters, writers, photographers, art historians and opinion leaders who unravel the extraordinary and mysterious impact of the 17th century Delft master Johannes Vermeer in our day and age.

== Writings ==
In 2006, Janson published his first book, How to Paint Your Own Vermeer: The Methods and Materials of a Seventeenth-Century Master, mainly thought as a manual for practicing painters who wish to emulate the great Dutch Master's technique and style. In addition to the book he produced a CD, How to Paint Your Own Vermeer. A Painting in Progress which documents the painting of an interior done in the style of Vermeer with sequential images that enhance the textual contents of How to Paint Your Own Vermeer.

His second publication, Looking Over Vermeer’s Shoulders. A Study of the Painting Methods and Materials of Johannes Vermeer is an adaptation from the first one, a comprehensive guide to the mysterious relationship between painting technique and artistic expression, as well as the mental and physical machinery of Johannes Vermeer.

== Publications ==
- How to Paint Your Own Vermeer: The Methods and Materials of a Seventeenth-Century Master. 1st edn 2006.
- How to Paint Your Own Vermeer. A Painting in Progress (CD). 1st edn 2008.
- Looking Over Vermeer's Shoulders. A Study of the Painting Methods and Materials of Johannes Vermeer. 2008.
