= Playbook (TV series) =

- Starring: Joe Theismann various analysts
- Country of origin: United States
- No. of seasons: 4

Production
- Running time: 60 minutes

Original release
- Network: NFL Network (2003–2006)
- Release: 2003 – May 7, 2019

Related
- NFL Total Access

Playbook is an American football show. Playbook went into the NFL Films room to examine a head coach's game film. In its original format, it was a 30-minute program hosted every weeknight during the NFL season and playoffs. In its new format, it was a one-hour program on Thursday and Friday, each day centering on either the AFC (Thursday) or the NFC (Friday).

== Personalities ==
Paul Burmeister was the host. The analysts were Sterling Sharpe, Solomon Wilcots, Mike Mayock, Brian Baldinger and Butch Davis.

In the new edition, Brian Baldinger, Joe Theismann and Sterling Sharpe host, with guest hosts, usually players on their bye week, occasionally coming on the program.

== Cancellation and rebranding ==
The program was cancelled when NFLN revamped its programming lineup in 2006. Elements of the show have been seen on NFL Total Access and NFL Replay. The show was brought back for the 2007 season with a new format, new hosts, new time slot, and a split to Playbook AFC and Playbook NFC.

Playbook was among several NFL Network programs canceled in a $20 million budget cut on May 7, 2019.
