= South River, New Jersey =

Borough in Middlesex County, New Jersey, US

- Borough
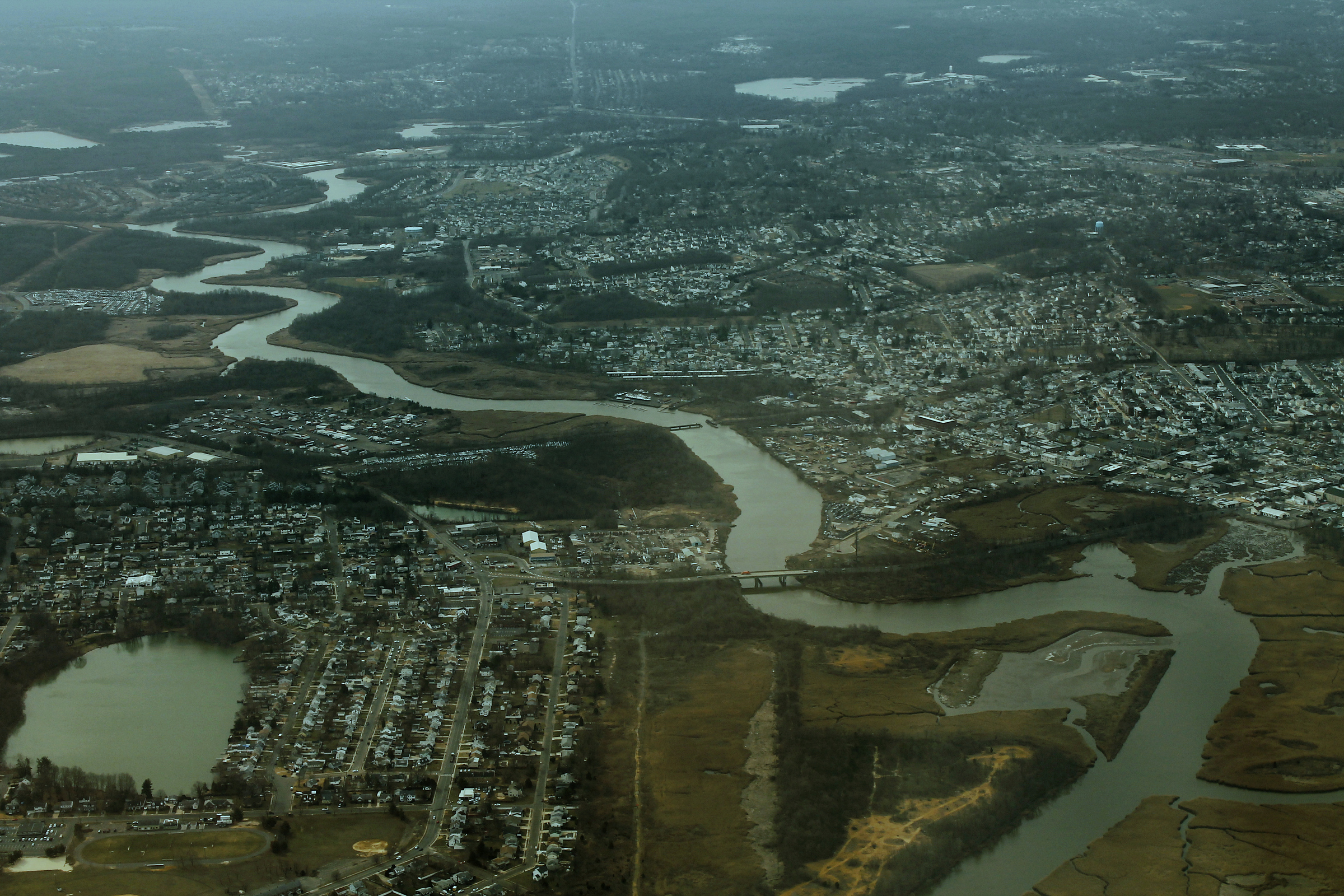
- Aerial view of South River borough, along the banks of the namesake South River tributary of the Raritan River

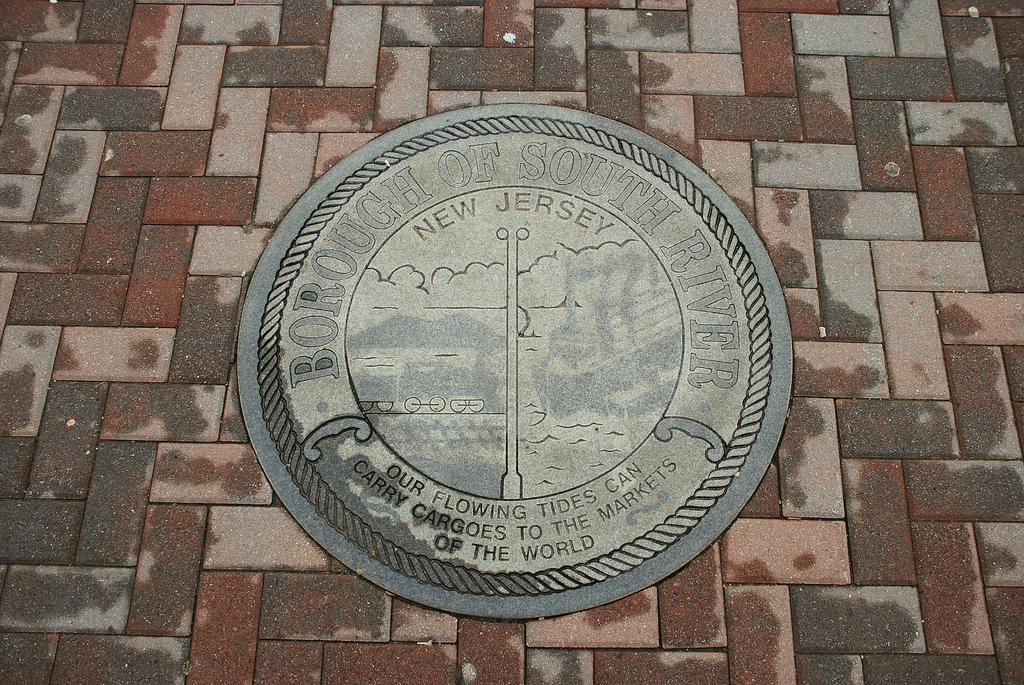
- Seal
- Motto: "A Community With a Proud Past and a Bright Future"
- Location of South River in Middlesex County highlighted in red (left). Inset map: Location of Middlesex County in New Jersey highlighted in orange (right).

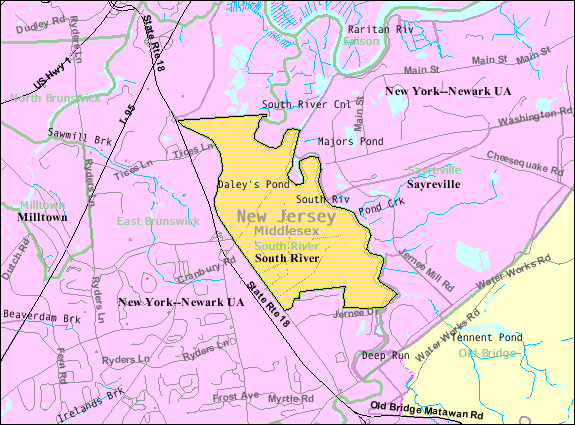
- Census Bureau map of South River, New Jersey

- Location in Middlesex County Location in New Jersey Location in the United States
- Coordinates: 40.445652°N 74.378459°W
- Country: United States
- State: New Jersey
- County: Middlesex
- Incorporated: February 28, 1898

Government
  - Type: Borough
  - Body: Borough Council
  - Mayor: Peter Guindi (R, term ends December 31, 2027)
  - Administrator: Arthur Londensky
  - Municipal clerk: Alyssa Guglietti

Area
  - Total: 2.94 sq mi (7.61 km^{2})
  - Land: 2.78 sq mi (7.21 km^{2})
  - Water: 0.15 sq mi (0.40 km^{2}) 5.27%
  - Rank: 336th of 564 in state 17th of 25 in county
- Elevation: 23 ft (7.0 m)

Population (2020)
  - Total: 16,118
  - Estimate (2024): 16,392
  - Rank: 164th of 564 in state 15th of 25 in county
  - Density: 5,787.4/sq mi (2,234.5/km^{2})
  - Rank: 95th of 564 in state 7th of 25 in county
- Time zone: UTC−05:00 (Eastern (EST))
  - Summer (DST): UTC−04:00 (Eastern (EDT))
- ZIP Codes: 08882
- Area code: 732
- FIPS code: 3402369420
- GNIS feature ID: 0885403
- Website: www.southrivernj.org

South River is a borough in Middlesex County, in the U.S. state of New Jersey. As of the 2020 United States census, the borough's population was 16,118, an increase of 110 (+0.7%) from the 2010 census count of 16,008, which in turn reflected an increase of 686 (+4.5%) from the 15,322 counted in the 2000 census.

What is now South River was originally formed as the town of Washington within East Brunswick Township on February 23, 1870. South River was incorporated as an independent borough by an act of the New Jersey Legislature on February 28, 1898, replacing Washington town. It was named after the Raritan River's South River tributary, which marks the borough's eastern and northeastern boundary.

== History ==
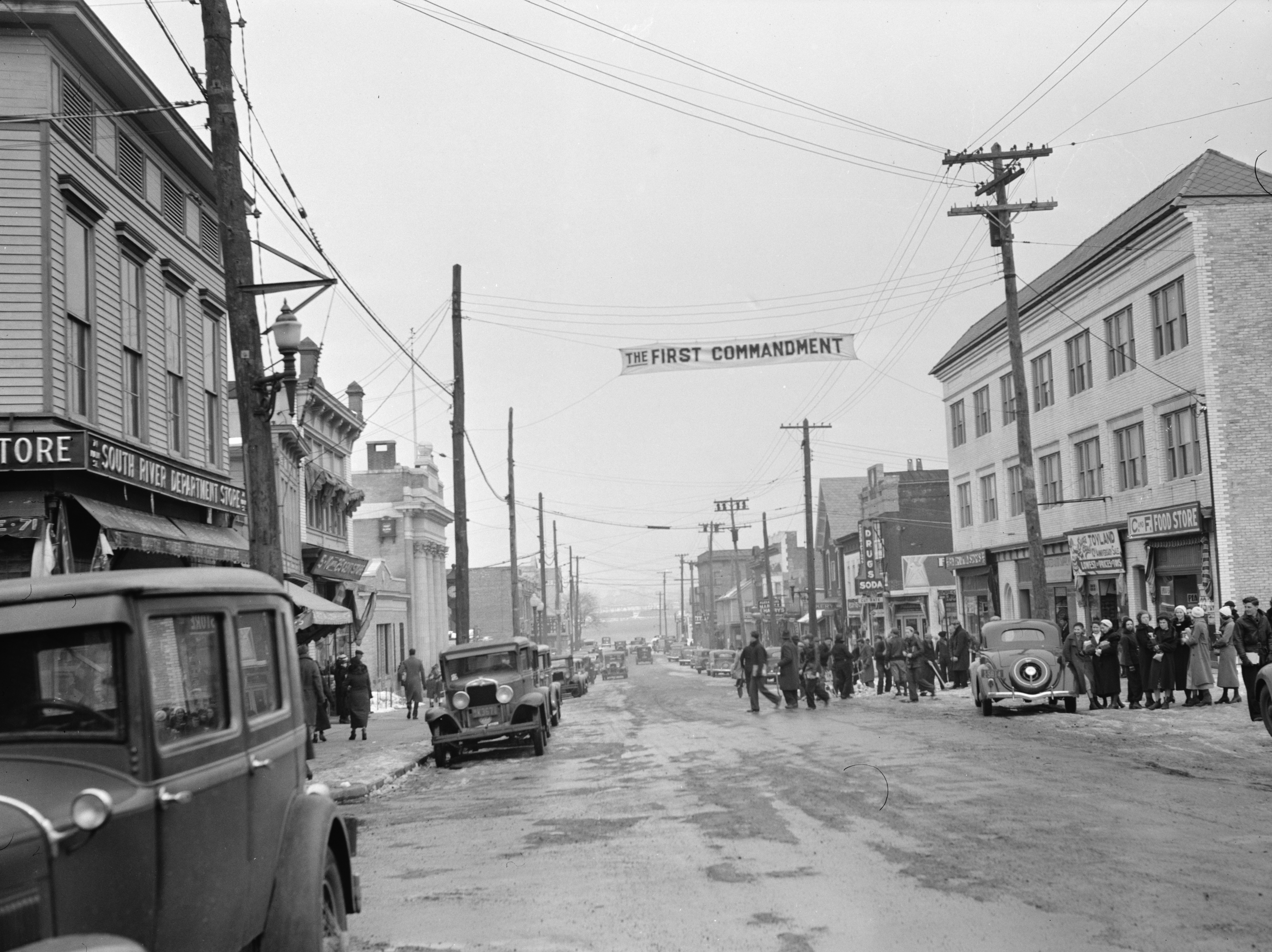
South River in 1936

South River was originally part of East Brunswick Township. Originally referred to as Washington, the community eventually split away, as did Spotswood and Milltown.

From 1683 to 1720, the area was commonly referred to as South River Landing. In 1720, the name Willettstown was adopted after settler Samuel Willett. In 1784, the name was changed to Washington and the area was variously referred to as Washington Village, Washington Woods, and Little Washington. The name was considered at the suggestion of Abraham Barkelew, one of the original settlers in the town. In 1870, the name was changed to South River and on February 28, 1898, South River officially became a borough.

== Geography ==
According to the United States Census Bureau, the borough had a total area of 2.94 square miles (7.61 km^{2}), including 2.79 square miles (7.21 km^{2}) of land and 0.16 square miles (0.40 km^{2}) of water (5.27%).

The borough borders the Middlesex County communities of East Brunswick and Sayreville.

Unincorporated communities, localities and place names located partially or completely within the borough include Newton Heights, which is situated along the border of South River and East Brunswick.

== Demographics ==
Historical population
Census	Pop.	Note	%±
1880	1,081		—
1890	1,796		66.1%
1900	2,792		55.5%
1910	4,772		70.9%
1920	6,596		38.2%
1930	10,759		63.1%
1940	10,714		−0.4%
1950	11,308		5.5%
1960	13,397		18.5%
1970	15,428		15.2%
1980	14,361		−6.9%
1990	13,692		−4.7%
2000	15,322		11.9%
2010	16,008		4.5%
2020	16,118		0.7%
2024 (est.)	16,392	▲	1.7%
Population sources: 1880–1890 1890–1920; 1890–1910 1910–1930; 1940–2000 2000; 2010 2020

=== 2020 census ===
As of the 2020 census, South River had a population of 16,118, with 5,694 households and 4,220 families. The population density was 5,787.4 per square mile (2,234.5/km^{2}), and there were 5,977 housing units at an average density of 2,146.1 per square mile (828.6/km^{2}). The median age was 39.1 years; 21.2% of residents were under age 18 and 13.7% were age 65 or older. For every 100 females, there were 101.7 males, and for every 100 females age 18 and over, there were 100.2 males age 18 and over. The borough had 8,127 males and 7,991 females, including 6,355 males age 18 and over and 6,345 females age 18 and over.

100.0% of residents lived in urban areas, while 0.0% lived in rural areas.

Of the 5,694 households, 34.3% had children under the age of 18 living in them. Of all households, 53.3% were married-couple households, 16.8% were households with a male householder and no spouse or partner present, and 23.4% were households with a female householder and no spouse or partner present; 25.9% were non-families. About 21.4% of all households were made up of individuals, including 9.9% with a male householder living alone and 11.5% with a female householder living alone. About 9.4% had someone living alone who was 65 years of age or older, including 3.2% with a male householder and 6.2% with a female householder.

Of housing units, 4.7% were vacant. The homeowner vacancy rate was 1.4% and the rental vacancy rate was 4.2%.

Racial composition as of the 2020 census
Race	Number	Percent
White	9,387	58.2%
Black or African American	1,072	6.7%
American Indian and Alaska Native	89	0.6%
Asian	832	5.2%
Native Hawaiian and Other Pacific Islander	5	0.0%
Some other race	2,680	16.6%
Two or more races	2,053	12.7%
Hispanic or Latino (of any race)	4,198	26.0%

=== Income and poverty ===
The Census Bureau's 2020-2024 American Community Survey showed that (in 2024 inflation-adjusted dollars), median household income was $96,147 (with a margin of error of +/- $14,340) and a median family income of $109,773 (+/- $27,503). Male full-time, year-round workers had a median income of $72,333 (+/- $11,382) versus $58,235 (+/- $7,720) for females. The per capita income for the borough was $42,301 (+/- $4,224). About 10.7% of families and 12.5% of the population were below the poverty line, including 23.5% of those under 18 and 10.3% of those 65 or older.

=== 2010 census ===
The 2010 United States census counted 16,008 people, 5,652 households, and 4,019 families in the borough. The population density was 5,781.4 per square mile (2,232.2/km^{2}). There were 5,957 housing units at an average density of 2,151.4 per square mile (830.7/km^{2}). The racial makeup was 76.18% (12,195) White, 7.13% (1,142) Black or African American, 0.31% (50) Native American, 4.84% (775) Asian, 0.06% (9) Pacific Islander, 8.18% (1,309) from other races, and 3.30% (528) from two or more races. Hispanics or Latinos of any race were 18.20% (2,913) of the population.

Of the 5,652 households, 32.5% had children under the age of 18; 53.5% were married couples living together; 12.2% had a female householder with no husband present and 28.9% were non-families. Of all households, 22.9% were made up of individuals and 10.1% had someone living alone who was 65 years of age or older. The average household size was 2.83 and the average family size was 3.32.

22.6% of the population were under the age of 18, 8.9% from 18 to 24, 30.6% from 25 to 44, 26.1% from 45 to 64, and 11.8% who were 65 years of age or older. The median age was 37.2 years. For every 100 females, the population had 103.3 males. For every 100 females ages 18 and older, there were 101.5 males.

The Census Bureau's 2006–2010 American Community Survey showed that (in 2010 inflation-adjusted dollars) median household income was $62,284 (with a margin of error of +/− $9,691) and the median family income was $78,109 (+/− $8,122). Males had a median income of $51,599 (+/− $6,269) versus $46,014 (+/− $3,025) for females. The per capita income for the borough was $28,178 (+/− $1,766). About 4.4% of families and 6.6% of the population were below the poverty line, including 6.9% of those under age 18 and 10.1% of those age 65 or over.

=== 2000 census ===
As of the 2000 United States census, there were 15,322 people, 5,606 households, and 3,985 families residing in the borough. The population density was 5,444.7 inhabitants per square mile (2,102.2/km^{2}). There were 5,769 housing units at an average density of 2,050.0 per square mile (791.5/km^{2}). The racial makeup of the borough was 83.55% White, 9.66% Hispanic or Latino, 6.06% African American, 0.12% Native American, 3.54% Asian, 0.05% Pacific Islander, 3.83% from other races, and 2.85% from two or more races.

The most common ancestries of the population are Polish (18.9%), Italian (14.6%), Irish (13.0%), German (12.5%), Portuguese (9.3%), and Russian (4.5%).

There were 5,606 households, out of which 32.3% had children under the age of 18 living with them, 55.2% were married couples living together, 11.1% had a female householder with no husband present, and 28.9% were non-families. 23.3% of all households were made up of individuals, and 11.4% had someone living alone who was 65 years of age or older. The average household size was 2.72 and the average family size was 3.23.

In the borough, the population was spread out, with 23.0% under the age of 18, 8.4% from 18 to 24, 33.4% from 25 to 44, 20.7% from 45 to 64, and 14.6% who were 65 years of age or older. The median age was 36 years. For every 100 females, there were 97.8 males. For every 100 females age 18 and over, there were 95.7 males.

The median income for a household in the borough was $52,324, and the median income for a family was $62,869. Males had a median income of $42,186 versus $31,098 for females. The per capita income for the borough was $23,684. About 3.7% of families and 4.9% of the population were below the poverty line, including 3.9% of those under age 18 and 7.3% of those age 65 or over.

A large Polish, Russian, and Portuguese immigrant population moved into the borough in the 1950s-1980s. Today, South River's largest incoming immigrant population are Asian, Mexican and Brazilian populations.

=== Belarusians in South River ===
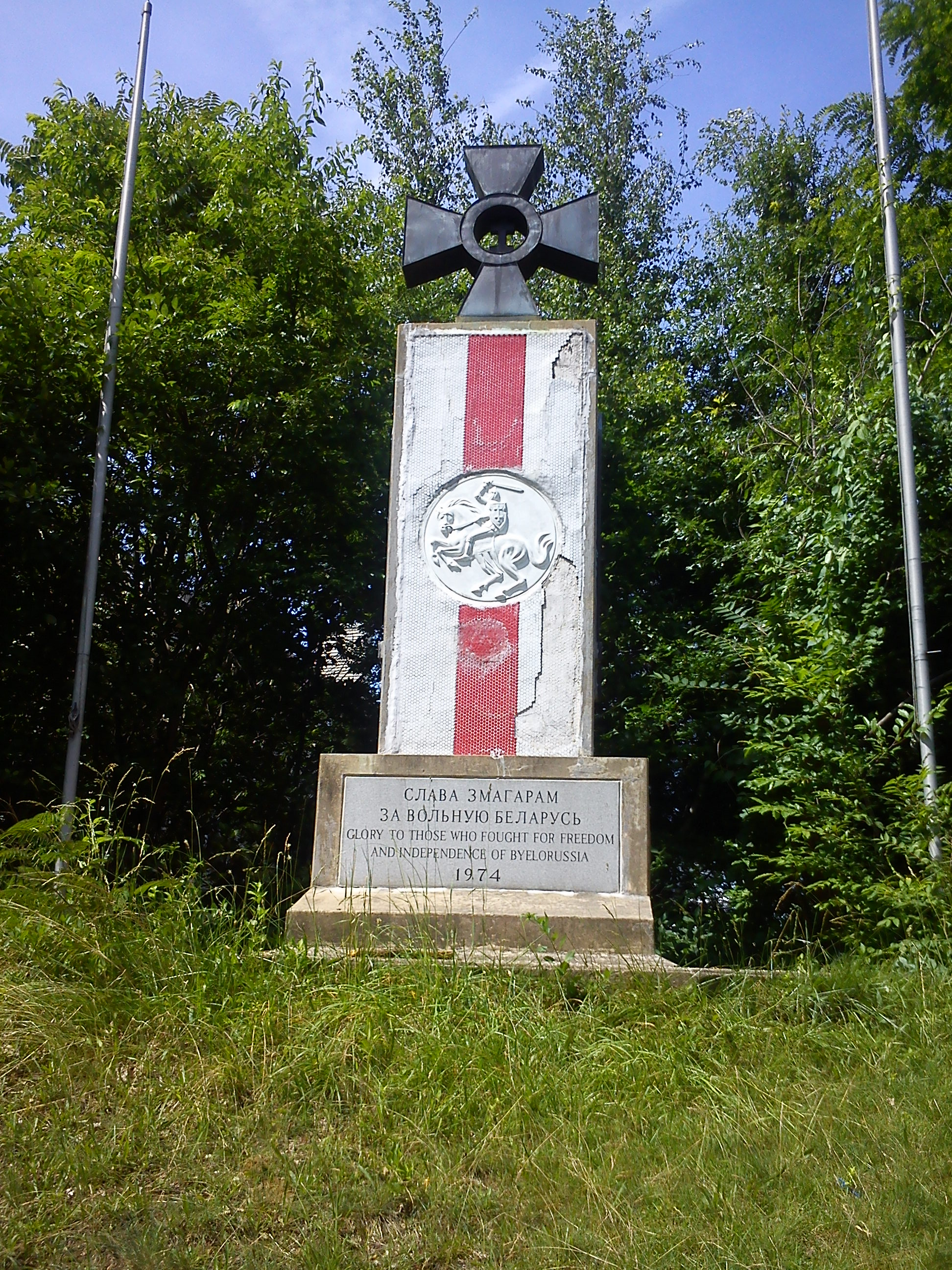
Monument for "Those who fought for Freedom and Independence of Byelorussia"

South River has become a center for Belarusian Americans in the postwar-period.

The first immigrants from present-day Belarus (from the areas of modern-day western Minsk Voblast and Hrodna Voblast, around the towns of Vilejka, Maladziečna and others) arrived to South River in the late 19th century. Most of the immigrants of that time identified themselves as Polish or Russian, depending on their faith. Immigrants from Belarus established a Roman Catholic church of Our Lady of the Gate of Dawn (a prominent Catholic icon in Vilnius, venerated primarily by Catholics in Western Belarus and Lithuania) and a 250 members strong Russian Orthodox parish of St. Peter and St. Paul.

The postwar immigrants founded the Belarusian Congress Committee of America here in 1951. In the 1950s, they reestablished the Belarusian Orthodox parish of St. Eufrasinnia, that previously existed in Germany. A Belarusian cemetery was opened in 1953, that also houses Radasłaŭ Astroŭski.

== Government ==
=== Local government ===
South River is governed under the borough form of New Jersey municipal government, which is used in 218 municipalities (of the 564) statewide, making it the most common form of government in New Jersey. The governing body is comprised of the mayor and the borough council, with all positions elected at-large on a partisan basis as part of the November general election. A mayor is elected directly by the voters to a four-year term of office. The borough council includes six members elected to serve three-year terms on a staggered basis, with two seats coming up for election each year in a three-year cycle. The borough form of government used by South River is a "weak mayor / strong council" government in which council members act as the legislative body with the mayor presiding at meetings and voting only in the event of a tie. The mayor can veto ordinances subject to an override by a two-thirds majority vote of the council. The mayor makes committee and liaison assignments for council members, and most appointments are made by the mayor with the advice and consent of the council.

As of 2024, the mayor of South River is Republican Peter S. Guindi, whose term of office ends December 31, 2027. Members of the Borough Council are Council President John Krenzel (R, 2024; appointed to serve an unexpired term), Donna Balazs (R, 2025), Anthony Ciulla (R, 2025), John Frost (R, 2024; appointed to serve an unexpired term), Henry Dziemian (R, 2026) and James Gurchensky (R, 2026).

John Frost was appointed in May 2024 to fill the term ending December 2024 that had been held by Jason Oliveira until he resigned from office the previous month.

In January 2014, the borough council selected former councilmember Michael Trenga from among three names nominated by the Republican municipal committee to fill the nearly three years remaining on the vacant seat of John Trzeciak, who cited personal reasons in resigning from office just weeks after taking his seat on the council. In the November 2014 general election, Trenga was elected to serve the balance of the term of office.

=== Federal, state and county representation ===
South River is located in the 12th Congressional District and is part of New Jersey's 18th state legislative district

For the 119th United States Congress, New Jersey's 12th congressional district is represented by Bonnie Watson Coleman (D, Ewing Township). New Jersey is represented in the United States Senate by Democrats Cory Booker (Newark, term ends 2027) and Andy Kim (Moorestown, term ends 2031).

For the 2026–2027 session, the 18th legislative district of the New Jersey Legislature is represented in the State Senate by Patrick J. Diegnan (D, South Plainfield) and in the General Assembly by Robert Karabinchak (D, Edison) and Sterley Stanley (D, East Brunswick).

Middlesex County is governed by a Board of County Commissioners, whose seven members are elected at-large on a partisan basis to serve three-year terms of office on a staggered basis, with either two or three seats coming up for election each year as part of the November general election. At an annual reorganization meeting held in January, the board selects from among its members a commissioner director and deputy director. As of 2025, Middlesex County's Commissioners (with party affiliation, term-end year, and residence listed in parentheses) are:

Director Ronald G. Rios (D, Carteret, 2027), Deputy Director Shanti Narra (D, North Brunswick, 2027), Claribel A. "Clary" Azcona-Barber (D, New Brunswick, 2025), Charles Kenny (D, Woodbridge Township, 2025), Leslie Koppel (D, Monroe Township, 2026), Chanelle Scott McCullum (D, Piscataway, 2025) and Charles E. Tomaro (D, Edison, 2026).

Constitutional officers are: Clerk Nancy Pinkin (D, 2025, East Brunswick), Sheriff Mildred S. Scott (D, 2025, Piscataway) and Surrogate Claribel Cortes (D, 2026; North Brunswick).

=== Politics ===
As of March 2011, there were a total of 7,901 registered voters in South River, of which 2,520 (31.9%) were registered as Democrats, 1,186 (15.0%) were registered as Republicans and 4,193 (53.1%) were registered as Unaffiliated. There were 2 voters registered as Libertarians or Greens.

United States presidential election results for South River
Year	Republican		Democratic		Third party(ies)	
Year	No.	%	No.	%	No.	%
2024	3,316	55.22%	2,573	42.85%	116	1.93%
2020	3,019	48.75%	3,094	49.96%	80	1.29%
2016	2,681	49.13%	2,596	47.57%	180	3.30%
2012	2,101	40.51%	3,033	58.48%	52	1.00%
2008	2,434	42.87%	3,148	55.45%	95	1.67%
2004	2,460	46.54%	2,763	52.27%	63	1.19%
2000	2,040	42.04%	2,590	53.38%	222	4.58%

In the 2012 presidential election, Democrat Barack Obama received 58.5% of the vote (3,033 cast), ahead of Republican Mitt Romney with 40.5% (2,101 votes), and other candidates with 1.0% (52 votes), among the 5,233 ballots cast by the borough's 8,095 registered voters (47 ballots were spoiled), for a turnout of 64.6%. In the 2008 presidential election, Democrat Barack Obama received 54.9% of the vote (3,148 cast), ahead of Republican John McCain with 42.5% (2,434 votes) and other candidates with 1.7% (95 votes), among the 5,729 ballots cast by the borough's 8,078 registered voters, for a turnout of 70.9%. In the 2004 presidential election, Democrat John Kerry received 51.8% of the vote (2,763 ballots cast), outpolling Republican George W. Bush with 46.1% (2,460 votes) and other candidates with 0.8% (63 votes), among the 5,331 ballots cast by the borough's 7,591 registered voters, for a turnout percentage of 70.2.

Gubernatorial election results for South River
Year	Republican		Democratic		Third party(ies)	
Year	No.	%	No.	%	No.	%
2025	2,115	48.17%	2,254	51.33%	22	0.50%
2021	1,994	56.33%	1,509	42.63%	37	1.05%
2017	1,508	50.86%	1,402	47.28%	55	1.85%
2013	1,997	63.80%	1,094	34.95%	39	1.25%
2009	1,916	53.81%	1,378	38.70%	267	7.50%
2005	1,554	44.43%	1,721	49.20%	223	6.38%

In the 2013 gubernatorial election, Republican Chris Christie received 63.8% of the vote (1,997 cast), ahead of Democrat Barbara Buono with 35.0% (1,094 votes), and other candidates with 1.2% (39 votes), among the 3,163 ballots cast by the borough's 8,146 registered voters (33 ballots were spoiled), for a turnout of 38.8%. In the 2009 gubernatorial election, Republican Chris Christie received 53.2% of the vote (1,916 ballots cast), ahead of Democrat Jon Corzine with 38.2% (1,378 votes), Independent Chris Daggett with 6.5% (235 votes) and other candidates with 0.9% (32 votes), among the 3,604 ballots cast by the borough's 7,787 registered voters, yielding a 46.3% turnout.

United States Senate election results for South River1
Year	Republican		Democratic		Third party(ies)	
Year	No.	%	No.	%	No.	%
2024	2,904	52.05%	2,497	44.76%	178	3.19%
2018	2,085	50.13%	1,924	46.26%	150	3.61%
2012	1,989	40.82%	2,804	57.54%	80	1.64%
2006	1,506	46.15%	1,631	49.98%	126	3.86%

United States Senate election results for South River2
Year	Republican		Democratic		Third party(ies)	
Year	No.	%	No.	%	No.	%
2020	2,803	46.20%	3,080	50.77%	184	3.03%
2014	1,286	47.09%	1,388	50.82%	57	2.09%
2013	911	53.81%	758	44.77%	24	1.42%
2008	2,197	42.19%	2,874	55.18%	137	2.63%

== Education ==
The South River Public Schools serve students in pre-kindergarten through twelfth grade. As of the 2024–25 school year, the district, comprised of five schools, had an enrollment of 2,435 students and 218.78 classroom teachers (on an FTE basis), for a student–teacher ratio of 11.13:1. Schools in the district (with 2024–25 enrollment data from the National Center for Education Statistics) are South River Early Learning Center with 151 students in PreK, South River Primary School with 508 students in grades PreK-2, South River Elementary School with 496 students in grades 3-5, South River Middle School with 524 students in grades 6-8 and South River High School with 716 students in grades 9-12.

Eighth grade students from all of Middlesex County are eligible to apply to attend the high school programs offered by the Middlesex County Magnet Schools, a county-wide vocational school district that offers full-time career and technical education at its schools in East Brunswick, Edison, Perth Amboy, Piscataway and Woodbridge Township, with no tuition charged to students for attendance.

== Transportation ==
=== Roads and highways ===
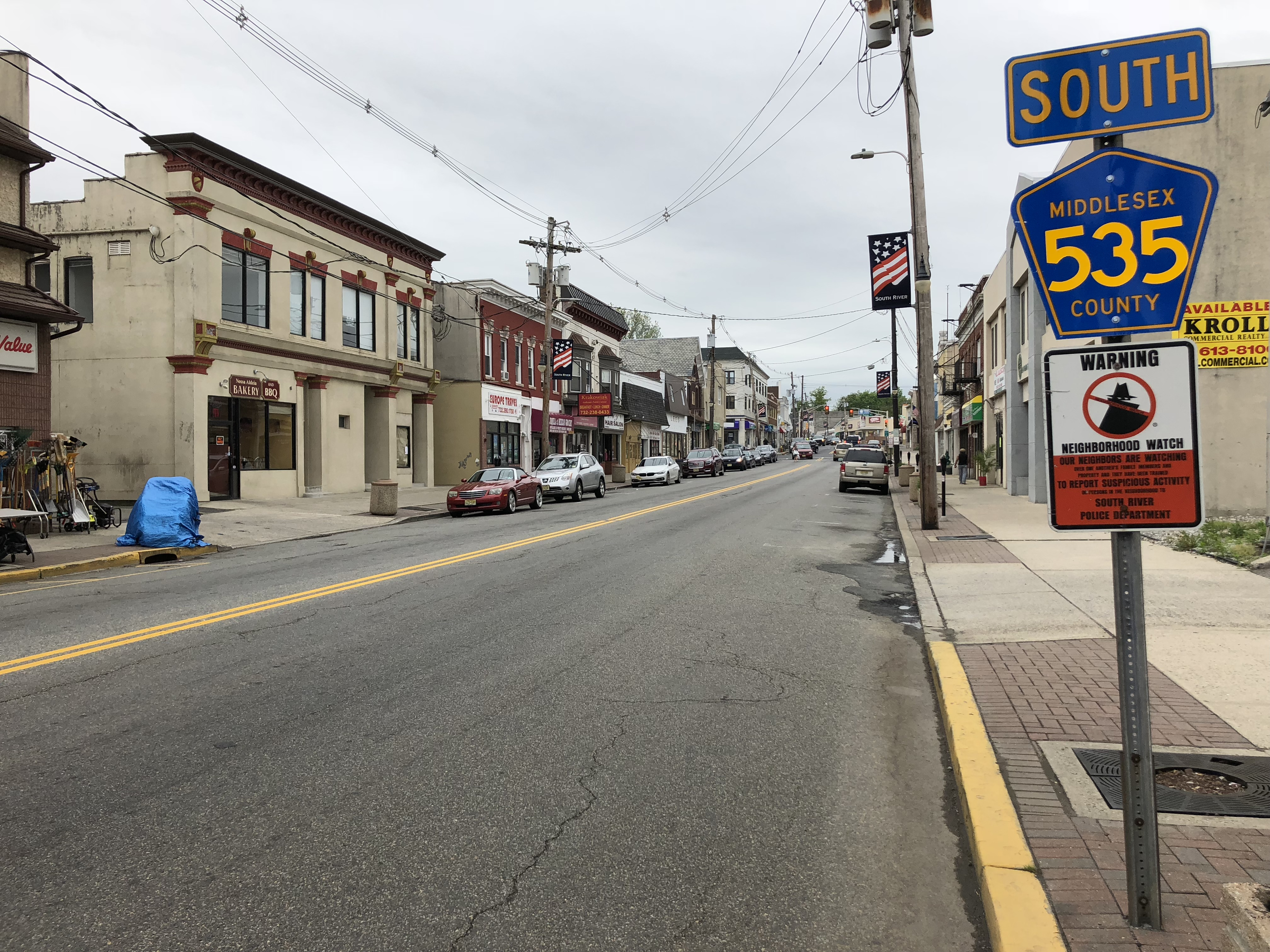
County Route 535 in South River

As of May 2010, the borough had a total of 49.25 miles (79.26 km) of roadways, of which 43.50 miles (70.01 km) were maintained by the municipality and 5.75 miles (9.25 km) by Middlesex County.

The main roads that travel through are CR 527 and CR 535. Route 18 passes just west of the borough, which provides access to the New Jersey Turnpike (Interstate 95).

=== Public transportation ===
NJ Transit bus service is provided on the 811 and 815 routes.

== Notable people ==
People who were born in, residents of, or otherwise closely associated with South River include:

- Radasłaŭ Astroŭski (1887–1976), Belarusian political leader and Nazi Collaborator
- George Brasno (1911–1982), vaudevillian performer known for his appearances alongside his sister Olive in the Our Gang comedies and Charlie Chan movie series
- Olive Brasno (1917–1998), vaudevillian performer known for her appearances in the Our Gang comedies and Charlie Chan movie series
- Joseph Csatari (1929-2025), painter
- Janet Evanovich (born 1943), author
- John H. Froude (born 1930), politician who served in the New Jersey General Assembly from 1972 to 1980
- Angelica Generosa, ballet dancer who is a principal dancer with the Pacific Northwest Ballet
- Lyle Goodhue (1903–1981), scientist
- Kenny Jackson (born 1962), former professional football player
- Jonathan Janson (born 1950), painter
- Stanley Kamel (1943–2008), actor who performed in the USA Network series Monk as Dr. Charles Kroger
- Barys Kit (1910–2018), Belarusian-American rocket scientist
- Evan Louro (born 1996), soccer player who plays as a goalkeeper for the New York Red Bulls in Major League Soccer
- Melbourne MacDowell (1856–1941), stage and silent screen actor, when the borough was still known as Little Washington
- Frank Mula (1950–2021), writer for The Simpsons
- Alfred Nisonoff (1923–2001), immunology researcher
- Drew Pearson (born 1951), former professional football player
- Brian Sicknick (1978–2021), officer of the United States Capitol Police who died following the January 6 United States Capitol attack
- Pete Sivess (1913–2003), pitcher for the Philadelphia Phillies
- Elmer Stout (1929–2013), football player
- Joe Susan (born 1955), former head coach of the Bucknell Bison football team and current Special Assistant to The Head Football Coach at Rutgers University
- Joe Theismann (born 1949), former professional football player
- Alex Wojciechowicz (1915–1992), professional football player
- Russell Zavistovich (1928–2000), leader of the Belarusian American community

== In popular culture ==
Rescue 911 (Season 3, Episode 25) features a segment about a Good Samaritan who assisted in the rescue of an occupant from an apartment fire on January 8, 1991, at the Emess Apartments (now known as Deer Creek Village).
