= South River High School (New Jersey) =

High school in Middlesex County, New Jersey, US

Location
- 11 Montgomery Street; South River, Middlesex County, New Jersey 08882; United States
- Coordinates: 40.4395°N 74.3811°W

Information
- Type: Public high school
- Established: Current location: 1961; High school program: 1891
- School district: South River Public Schools
- NCES School ID: 341539003648
- Principal: Jamie Kinard
- Faculty: 59.05 FTEs
- Grades: 9–12
- Enrollment: 716 (as of 2024–25)
- Student to teacher ratio: 12.13:1
- Colors: Maroon and Gray
- Athletics conference: Greater Middlesex Conference (general); Big Central Football Conference (football)
- Team name: Rams
- Rival: Spotswood Chargers
- Newspaper: The Ram
- Yearbook: Oriflamme
- Website: hs.srivernj.org

South River High School is a four-year comprehensive community public high school that serves students in ninth through twelfth grades from South River in Middlesex County, in the U.S. state of New Jersey, operating as the lone secondary school of the South River Public Schools. South River High School is overseen by the New Jersey Department of Education.

As of the 2024–25 school year, the school had an enrollment of 716 students and 59.05 classroom teachers (on an FTE basis), for a student–teacher ratio of 12.13:1. There were 378 students (52.8% of enrollment) eligible for free lunch and 82 (11.5% of students) eligible for reduced-cost lunch.

== Awards, recognition and rankings ==
The school was the 227th-ranked public high school in New Jersey out of 339 schools statewide in New Jersey Monthly magazine's September 2014 cover story on the state's "Top Public High Schools", using a new ranking methodology. The school had been ranked 249th in the state of 328 schools in 2012, after being ranked 234th in 2010 out of 322 schools listed. The magazine ranked the school 186th in 2008 out of 316 schools. The school was ranked 271st in the magazine's September 2006 issue, which surveyed 316 schools across the state.

== Athletics ==
The South River High School Rams participates in the Greater Middlesex Conference, which is comprised of public and private high schools located in the greater Middlesex County area and operates under the supervision of the New Jersey State Interscholastic Athletic Association (NJSIAA). With 504 students in grades 10-12, the school was classified by the NJSIAA for the 2019–20 school year as Group II for most athletic competition purposes, which included schools with an enrollment of 486 to 758 students in that grade range. The football team competes in Division 2B of the Big Central Football Conference, which includes 60 public and private high schools in Hunterdon, Middlesex, Somerset, Union and Warren counties, which are broken down into 10 divisions by size and location. The school was classified by the NJSIAA as Group II South for football for 2024–2026, which included schools with 514 to 685 students.

Interscholastic sports offered at South River High School include soccer, football, wrestling, basketball, track and field, cross-country, tennis, bowling, baseball, and softball.

The school participates together with Spotswood High School in a joint ice hockey team in which East Brunswick High School is the host school / lead agency. The co-op program operates under agreements scheduled to expire at the end of the 2023–24 school year.

The football team won the Central Jersey Group II state championship in 1977-1979, and won the Central Jersey Group I title in 1980, 1983, 1991, 1995, 2000 and 2001. After a 2-0 loss in their first game of the season, the 1977 won out the balance of their schedule, finishing with a 10-1 record after defeating Red Bank Regional High School by a score of 28-0 in the Central Jersey Group II playoff finals. The 1978 team defeated previously unbeaten Shore Regional High School by a score of 21-7 to win the Central Jersey Group II state sectional title, scoring three touchdowns after being behind 7-0 at halftime. A 23-3 win against North Brunswick High School in the championship game gave the 1979 team the Central Jersey Group II sectional title and a 10-0-1 record to bring the team to 32 games without a loss. The 1980 team won the Central Jersey Group I sectional title with a 24-13 victory against Spotswood High School in the playoff finals. The 1983 team finished the season with a 9-2 record and won its fifth sectional title in a seven year-span after defeating Dunellen High School by a score of 21-7 in the Central Jersey Group II sectional championship game. The 1991 team won the Central Jersey Group I sectional title with a 14-0 win against Dunellen. The 2001 team finished the season with a record of 10-0 after a 12-7 win against Shore Regional High School in the Central Jersey Group I sectional finals played at Kean University.

The 1980 boys' basketball team finished the season with a record of 25-3 after winning the Group II state championship game by a score of 65-60 against a Berkeley Heights High School team that had come back to tie the game in the third quarter but fell behind when they couldn't hit critical foul shots.

The boys' wrestling team won the Central Jersey Group I sectional title in 1988, 1991, 1995-1997 and 2002.

The last team to win a sectional State Championship was Baseball in 2016. South River defeated Keyport 5-0 to win the Central Jersey Group 1 State Championship. South River finished with a record of 19-8-1 also winning the GMC Blue division title.

== National Honor Society ==
The National Honor Society (NHS) includes students who have proved their dedication to education with their outstanding grades. Initially, a person is required a GPA (grade point average) of 3.5 or higher. This is only available to grades 10, 11, and 12. They must complete another requirement either by essay or an activity sheet. The National Honor Society emphasizes that "Selection to NHS is a privilege, not a right. Students do not apply for membership in the National Honor Society; instead, they provide information to be used by the local selection committee to support their candidacy for membership." (National Honor Society Handbook, 15th edition)

In addition to scholarship (as demonstrated by the GPA), there are three other, equally weighted areas in which potential NHS inductees must excel. These are leadership, service, and character. Academically eligible students who are interested in seeking selection into the NHS are expected to participate in activities, both in and out of school, which will enable them to exhibit these elements. According to the National Honor Society Handbook, "Leadership roles in both the school and community may be considered, provided they can be verified ... In considering service, the contributions [the] candidate has made to school, classmates, and community, as well as the student's attitude toward service can be reviewed ... [and] the society supports and recommends the use of a multi-faceted definition of character known as the `Six Pillars of Character' ... A person of character demonstrates the following six qualities: respect, responsibility, trustworthiness, fairness, caring, and citizenship."

Each year the Faculty Council reviews the information provided by each candidate, as well as faculty evaluation forms in order to make consistent, equitable selection determinations. An individual interview may be offered in an effort to afford candidates an additional opportunity to provide the Faculty Council with relevant information and clarify any questions that may arise.

== Administration ==
The school's principal is Jamie Kinard.

== Notable alumni ==
Notable alumni of South River High School include:

- Patty Casazza, one of the Jersey Girls, instrumental in the creation of the 9/11 Commission
- Janet Evanovich (born 1943), author
- John H. Froude (born 1930), politician who served in the New Jersey General Assembly from 1972 to 1980
- Kenny Jackson (born 1962), former wide receiver for the Philadelphia Eagles and collegiate All-American at Penn State University
- Frank Mula (1950–2021), writer for The Simpsons.
- Drew Pearson (born 1951), former wide receiver for the Dallas Cowboys
- Elmer Stout (1929–2013), football player
- Joe Theismann (born 1949), former quarterback who played in the NFL for the Washington Redskins
- Alex Wojciechowicz (1915–1992), offensive lineman and linebacker who played for the Detroit Lions and Philadelphia Eagles
