= To the nines =

English idiom

"To the nines" is an idiom meaning "to perfection" or "to the highest degree". In modern English usage, the phrase most commonly appears as "dressed to the nines" or "dressed up to the nines".

== Origin ==
The phrase is said to be Scots in origin. The earliest written example of the phrase is from the 1719 Epistle to Ramsay by the Scottish poet William Hamilton:

The bonny Lines therein thou sent me,
How to the nines they did content me.

Robert Burns' "Poem on Pastoral Poetry", published in 1791, also uses the phrase:

Thou paints auld nature to the nines,
In thy sweet Caledonian lines.

Brewer's Dictionary of Phrase and Fable (New and Revised edition. 1981) states that the phrase is "perhaps a corruption of 'then eyne' (to the eyes)"

The phrase may have originally been associated with the Nine Worthies or the nine Muses. A poem from a 17th century collection of works by John Rawlet contains the following lines:

The learned tribe whose works the World do bless,
Finish those works in some recess;
Both the Philosopher and Divine,
And Poets most who still make their address
In private to the Nine.
