= Danielle Steel bibliography =

This bibliography is a list of works from American writer Danielle Steel. As of 2025, she has written more than 210 books, including 182 novels and 18 children books. Her books have been translated into 43 languages and can be found in 69 countries across the globe. (Note: Sources vary on the exact number of books written by Steel, placing it between 179 and 210. Since 2023 her website states 210 is the total number, with 182 novels and 18 children books. She has released between 6 and 7 books per year since 2016, so the precise number changes frequently.)

== Novels ==
A list of all novels by Danielle Steel, linked to from Steel's official site, can be found here.

Key
*	New York Times hardcover fiction number-one bestseller

Year	Title
1973	Going Home
1977	Passion's Promise (US) / Golden Moments (UK)
1978	Now and Forever
1978	The Promise
1979	Season of Passion
1979	Summer's End
1980	The Ring
1981	Palomino
1981	To Love Again
1981	Remembrance
1981	Loving
1982	Once in a Lifetime
1982	Crossings
1983	A Perfect Stranger
1983	Thurston House
1983	Changes
1984	Full Circle*
1985	Family Album*
1985	Secrets
1986	Wanderlust*
1987	Fine Things*
1987	Kaleidoscope*
1987	Zoya*
1989	Star*
1989	Daddy*
1990	Message from Nam
1991	Heartbeat*
1991	No Greater Love
1992	Jewels*
1992	Mixed Blessings*
1993	Vanished
1994	Accident*
1994	The Gift*
1994	Wings
1995	Lightning
1995	Five Days in Paris*
1996	Malice
1996	Silent Honor*
1997	The Ranch
1997	Special Delivery*
1997	The Ghost*
1998	The Long Road Home*
1998	The Klone and I*
1998	Mirror Image
1999	Bittersweet*
1999	Granny Dan
1999	Irresistible Forces
2000	The Wedding*
2000	The House on Hope Street*
2000	Journey
2001	Lone Eagle
2001	Leap of Faith*
2001	The Kiss*
2002	The Cottage
2002	Sunset in St. Tropez
2002	Answered Prayers*
2003	Dating Game
2003	Johnny Angel*
2003	Safe Harbour
2004	Ransom
2004	Second Chance
2004	Echoes
2005	Impossible
2005	Miracle
2005	Toxic Bachelors
2006	The House*
2006	Coming Out
2006	H.R.H.
2007	Sisters
2007	Bungalow 2
2007	Amazing Grace
2008	Honor Thyself
2008	Rogue
2008	A Good Woman
2009	One Day at a Time
2009	Matters of the Heart
2009	Southern Lights
2010	Big Girl
2010	Family Ties
2010	Legacy
2011	44 Charles Street
2011	Happy Birthday
2011	Hotel Vendome
2012	Betrayal
2012	Friends Forever
2012	The Sins of the Mother
2013	Until the End of Time*
2013	First Sight
2013	Winners
2014	Power Play
2014	A Perfect Life
2014	Pegasus
2015	Prodigal Son
2015	Country
2015	Undercover
2015	Precious Gifts
2016	Blue*
2016	Property of a Noblewoman
2016	The Apartment
2016	Magic
2016	Rushing Waters
2016	The Award
2017	The Mistress
2017	Dangerous Games
2017	Against All Odds
2017	The Duchess
2017	The Right Time
2017	Fairytale
2017	Past Perfect
2018	Fall from Grace
2018	Accidental Heroes
2018	The Cast
2018	The Good Fight
2018	In His Father's Footsteps
2018	Beauchamp Hall
2019	Turning Point
2019	Silent Night
2019	Blessing in Disguise
2019	Lost and Found
2019	The Dark Side
2019	Child's Play
2019	Spy
2020	Moral Compass
2020	The Numbers Game
2020	The Wedding Dress
2020	Daddy's Girls
2020	Royal
2020	All That Glitters
2021	Neighbors
2021	The Affair
2021	Finding Ashley
2021	Nine Lives
2021	Complications
2021	The Butler
2021	Flying Angels
2022	Invisible
2022	High Stakes
2022	Beautiful
2022	Suspects
2022	The Challenge
2022	The High Notes
2022	The Whittiers
2023	Without a Trace
2023	Worthy Opponents
2023	The Wedding Planner
2023	Palazzo
2023	Happiness
2023	Second Act
2023	The Ball at Versailles
2024	Upside Down
2024	Never Too Late
2024	Only The Brave
2024	Resurrection
2024	Joy
2024	Triangle
2024	Trial by Fire
2025	Never Say Never
2025	Far From Home
2025	A Mind of Her Own
2025	A Mother's Love
2025	For Richer For Poorer
2025	The Portrait
2025	The Color of Hope
2026	The Devil's Daughter
2026	Felicia's Favorites
2026	A Woman's Place
2026	Weddings
2026	The True Meaning of Love
2026	Ruthless
2026	Celebration
2027	24 Hours
2027	Strong in the Broken Places
2027	Brave Together
2027	The Light Within
2027	Broken Hearted
2027	Lucky
2027	Home for Christmas

== Non-fiction ==
- Love: Poems (1984)
- Having a Baby (1984)
- His Bright Light (1998)
- A Gift of Hope: Helping the Homeless (2012)
- Pure Joy: The Dogs We Love (2013)
- Expect a Miracle (2020)

== Picture books ==
- The Happiest Hippo in the World (2009)
- Pretty Minnie in Paris (2014)
- Pretty Minnie in Hollywood (2016)

== Children's books ==
=== Max & Martha series ===
- Martha's New Daddy (1989)
- Max and the Babysitter (1989)
- Martha's Best Friend (1989)
- Max's Daddy Goes to the Hospital (1989)
- Max's New Baby (1989)
- Martha's New School (1989)
- Max Runs Away (1990)
- Martha's New Puppy (1990)
- Max and Grandma and Grampa Winky (1991)
- Martha and Hilary and the Stranger (1991)

=== Freddie series ===
- Freddie's Trip (1992)
- Freddie's First Night Away (1992)
- Freddie and the Doctor (1992)
- Freddie's Accident (1992)
