= Vanished =

Vanished or The Vanished may refer to:

== Film and television ==
- Vanished!, a 1971 TV film adaptation of Fletcher Knebel's novel starring Richard Widmark
- Vanished (1995 film) or Danielle Steel's Vanished, an American romantic drama TV film
- "Vanished", an episode of NCIS (season 2)
- Vanished (2006 TV series), an American serial drama TV series
- Vanished (2006 film), an American TV film on Lifetime TV featuring A. J. Cook
- Vanished (2009 film), a Cambodian thriller
- Vanished (2012 film), a short film featuring Scott Elrod
- Vanished (2014 film), an American romantic drama film starring Richard Bryant
- The Vanished (2018 film), a South Korean psychological thriller
- The Vanished (2020 film), an American action thriller
- Vanished (British TV series), a 2023 factual series
- Vanished (2026 TV series), an American serial mystery

== Literature ==
- Vanished, a 2009 novel by Joseph Finder
- Vanished, a 1968 political novel by Fletcher Knebel
- Vanished, a 1988 novel by Mary McGarry Morris
- A Void, 1969 French novel, also translated under the titles A Vanishing and Vanish'd
- Vanished (novel), a 1993 novel by Danielle Steel

== Music ==
- "Vanished" (Crystal Castles song) (2008)
- "Vanished", a 2004 song by Front Line Assembly from Civilization

== Other uses ==
- The Vanished (podcast), a podcast hosted by Marissa Jones
- The Vanished (Star Trek: The Role Playing Game), a 1983 role-playing game adventure
- The Vanished (Marvel Cinematic Universe), a name for victims of the Blip, an event in the Marvel Cinematic Universe

== See also ==
- Vanish (disambiguation)
- Vanishing (disambiguation)
