= List of The New York Times number-one books of 1997 =

The American daily newspaper The New York Times publishes multiple weekly lists ranking the best selling books in the United States.

== Fiction ==
The following list ranks the number-one best selling fiction books, in the hardcover fiction category.

Date	Book	Author
January 5	Airframe	Michael Crichton
January 12	Airframe	Michael Crichton
January 19	Airframe	Michael Crichton
January 26	Airframe	Michael Crichton
February 2	Hornet's Nest	Patricia Cornwell
February 9	Hornet's Nest	Patricia Cornwell
February 16	Hornet's Nest	Patricia Cornwell
February 23	Hornet's Nest	Patricia Cornwell
March 2	Sole Survivor	Dean Koontz
March 9	Sole Survivor	Dean Koontz
March 16	The Partner	John Grisham
March 23	The Partner	John Grisham
March 30	The Partner	John Grisham
April 6	The Partner	John Grisham
April 13	The Partner	John Grisham
April 20	The Partner	John Grisham
April 27	The Partner	John Grisham
May 4	Pretend You Don't See Her	Mary Higgins Clark
May 11	Pretend You Don't See Her	Mary Higgins Clark
May 18	Pretend You Don't See Her	Mary Higgins Clark
May 25	Pretend You Don't See Her	Mary Higgins Clark
June 1	Pretend You Don't See Her	Mary Higgins Clark
June 8	The Partner	John Grisham
June 15	Plum Island	Nelson DeMille
June 22	Plum Island	Nelson DeMille
June 29	Plum Island	Nelson DeMille
July 6	Plum Island	Nelson DeMille
July 13	Plum Island	Nelson DeMille
July 20	Special Delivery	Danielle Steel
July 27	Special Delivery	Danielle Steel
August 3	Unnatural Exposure	Patricia Cornwell
August 10	Unnatural Exposure	Patricia Cornwell
August 17	Unnatural Exposure	Patricia Cornwell
August 24	Unnatural Exposure	Patricia Cornwell
August 31	Cold Mountain	Charles Frazier
September 7	Cold Mountain	Charles Frazier
September 14	Cold Mountain	Charles Frazier
September 21	Cold Mountain	Charles Frazier
September 28	Cold Mountain	Charles Frazier
October 5	Cold Mountain	Charles Frazier
October 12	Flood Tide	Clive Cussler
October 19	Flood Tide	Clive Cussler
October 26	Flood Tide	Clive Cussler
November 2	Cold Mountain	Charles Frazier
November 9	Cold Mountain	Charles Frazier
November 16	Cold Mountain	Charles Frazier
November 23	Cold Mountain	Charles Frazier
November 30	The Ghost	Danielle Steel
December 7	Cold Mountain	Charles Frazier
December 14	Cold Mountain	Charles Frazier
December 21	Cold Mountain	Charles Frazier
December 28	Cold Mountain	Charles Frazier

== Nonfiction ==
The following list ranks the number-one best selling nonfiction books, in the hardcover nonfiction category.

Date	Book	Author
January 5	A Reporter's Life	Walter Cronkite
January 12	A Reporter's Life	Walter Cronkite
January 19	A Reporter's Life	Walter Cronkite
January 26	A Reporter's Life	Walter Cronkite
February 2	A Reporter's Life	Walter Cronkite
February 9	A Reporter's Life	Walter Cronkite
February 16	Angela's Ashes	Frank McCourt
February 23	Personal History	Katharine Graham
March 2	Personal History	Katharine Graham
March 9	Personal History	Katharine Graham
March 16	Murder in Brentwood	Mark Fuhrman
March 23	Murder in Brentwood	Mark Fuhrman
March 30	Angela's Ashes	Frank McCourt
April 6	Angela's Ashes	Frank McCourt
April 13	Angela's Ashes	Frank McCourt
April 20	Angela's Ashes	Frank McCourt
April 27	Angela's Ashes	Frank McCourt
May 4	Angela's Ashes	Frank McCourt
May 11	Underboss	Peter Maas
May 18	Angela's Ashes	Frank McCourt
May 25	Mothers & Daughters	Carol Saline and Sharon J. Wohlmuth
June 1	Without a Doubt	Marcia Clark with Teresa Carpenter
June 8	Into Thin Air	Jon Krakauer
June 15	Into Thin Air	Jon Krakauer
June 22	Into Thin Air	Jon Krakauer
June 29	Just as I Am	Billy Graham
July 6	Into Thin Air	Jon Krakauer
July 13	Angela's Ashes	Frank McCourt
July 20	Angela's Ashes	Frank McCourt
July 27	Angela's Ashes	Frank McCourt
August 3	Angela's Ashes	Frank McCourt
August 10	Angela's Ashes	Frank McCourt
August 17	Angela's Ashes	Frank McCourt
August 24	Angela's Ashes	Frank McCourt
August 31	Angela's Ashes	Frank McCourt
September 7	Angela's Ashes	Frank McCourt
September 14	Angela's Ashes	Frank McCourt
September 21	Angela's Ashes	Frank McCourt
September 28	Angela's Ashes	Frank McCourt
October 5	The Royals	Kitty Kelley
October 12	The Royals	Kitty Kelley
October 19	The Royals	Kitty Kelley
October 26	The Royals	Kitty Kelley
November 2	Diana: Her True Story – In Her Own Words	Andrew Morton
November 9	Diana: Her True Story – In Her Own Words	Andrew Morton
November 16	Diana: Her True Story – In Her Own Words	Andrew Morton
November 23	Angela's Ashes	Frank McCourt
November 30	Midnight in the Garden of Good and Evil	John Berendt
December 7	Midnight in the Garden of Good and Evil	John Berendt
December 14	Midnight in the Garden of Good and Evil	John Berendt
December 21	Midnight in the Garden of Good and Evil	John Berendt
December 28	Midnight in the Garden of Good and Evil	John Berendt

== See also ==
- Publishers Weekly list of bestselling novels in the United States in the 1990s
