= Vendome (disambiguation) =

Vendôme is a town in Loir-et-Cher, central France.

Vendome or Vendôme may also refer to:

== People ==
- List of counts and dukes of Vendôme, including:
  - Louis Joseph, Duke of Vendôme (1654–1712) French general and marshal of France
  - Renaud of Vendôme, both bishop of Paris from 991 to 1017 as well as count of Vendôme (1005–1017).
  - Fulk of Vendôme, count of Vendôme from 1028 until his expulsion in 1032 and again from 1056 to his death in 1066
  - Geoffrey II, Count of Anjou (1032–1056)
  - Geoffrey II of Vendôme (1085–1102)
  - John VI of Vendôme (1354–1364)
  - Catherine of Vendôme (1372–1403)
  - Louis, Count of Vendôme (1403–1446), son of the above, later Louis de Bourbon

== Locations ==
- Place Vendôme, large square in Paris, with the Vendôme column
  - Place Vendome (disambiguation), other uses
- Vendome (restaurant), near Cologne, Germany
- Vendôme, a cinema in Brussels, Belgium, location for the Brussels Short Film Festival
- Vendôme Battery, large 18th-century gun-platform in Malta
- Le Vendôme Beirut Hotel, Beirut
- The Vendome and the St. Ives, historic houses in Worcester, Mass., US
- Vendôme station, a Montreal intermodal transit station for metro and commuter rail
- Vendôme Tower, a fort in Malta built 1715

== Other uses ==
- Hotel Vendome (disambiguation)
- Vendôme (typeface), a set of characters designed in 1954

== See also ==
- Hotel Vendome fire, 1972 fire in Boston that claimed the lives of nine firefighters
