= List of The New York Times number-one books of 2000 =

The American daily newspaper The New York Times publishes multiple weekly lists ranking the best selling books in the United States. The lists are split into three genres—fiction, nonfiction and children's books. Both the fiction and nonfiction lists are further split into multiple lists.

== Changes to the list ==
On July 23, 2000, a new list was created for best-selling children's books. This controversial decision was due to the dominance of the Harry Potter series, which had occupied three of the top spots for over a year.

== Fiction ==
The following list ranks the number-one best selling fiction books, in the hardcover fiction category.

Date	Book	Author
January 2	Harry Potter and the Chamber of Secrets	J. K. Rowling
January 9	Harry Potter and the Chamber of Secrets	J. K. Rowling
January 16	Harry Potter and the Chamber of Secrets	J. K. Rowling
January 23	Harry Potter and the Chamber of Secrets	J. K. Rowling
January 30	Harry Potter and the Chamber of Secrets	J. K. Rowling
February 6	Harry Potter and the Chamber of Secrets	J. K. Rowling
February 13	Harry Potter and the Chamber of Secrets	J. K. Rowling
February 20	The Brethren	John Grisham
February 27	The Brethren	John Grisham
March 5	The Brethren	John Grisham
March 12	The Brethren	John Grisham
March 19	The Brethren	John Grisham
March 26	The Brethren	John Grisham
April 2	The Brethren	John Grisham
April 9	The Brethren	John Grisham
April 16	The Brethren	John Grisham
April 23	The Wedding	Danielle Steel
April 30	The Wedding	Danielle Steel
May 7	Before I Say Good-Bye	Mary Higgins Clark
May 14	Before I Say Good-Bye	Mary Higgins Clark
May 21	Before I Say Good-Bye	Mary Higgins Clark
May 28	Before I Say Good-Bye	Mary Higgins Clark
June 4	Easy Prey	John Sandford
June 11	The Indwelling	Tim LaHaye and Jerry B. Jenkins
June 18	The Indwelling	Tim LaHaye and Jerry B. Jenkins
June 25	The Indwelling	Tim LaHaye and Jerry B. Jenkins
July 2	The Indwelling	Tim LaHaye and Jerry B. Jenkins
July 9	Hot Six	Janet Evanovich
July 16	The House on Hope Street	Danielle Steel
July 23	The House on Hope Street	Danielle Steel
July 30	The House on Hope Street	Danielle Steel
August 6	The House on Hope Street	Danielle Steel
August 13	The House on Hope Street	Danielle Steel
August 20	Winter Solstice	Rosamunde Pilcher
August 27	Winter Solstice	Rosamunde Pilcher
September 3	Winter Solstice	Rosamunde Pilcher
September 10	The Bear and the Dragon	Tom Clancy
September 17	The Bear and the Dragon	Tom Clancy
September 24	The Bear and the Dragon	Tom Clancy
October 1	The Bear and the Dragon	Tom Clancy
October 8	The Bear and the Dragon	Tom Clancy
October 15	The Rescue	Nicholas Sparks
October 22	The Rescue	Nicholas Sparks
October 29	Drowning Ruth	Christina Schwarz
November 5	The Last Precinct	Patricia Cornwell
November 12	The Last Precinct	Patricia Cornwell
November 19	The Last Precinct	Patricia Cornwell
November 26	Winter's Heart	Robert Jordan
December 3	The Mark	Tim LaHaye and Jerry B. Jenkins
December 10	The Mark	Tim LaHaye and Jerry B. Jenkins
December 17	The Mark	Tim LaHaye and Jerry B. Jenkins
December 24	The Mark	Tim LaHaye and Jerry B. Jenkins
December 31	The Mark	Tim LaHaye and Jerry B. Jenkins

== Nonfiction ==
The following list ranks the number-one best selling nonfiction books, in the hardcover nonfiction category.

Date	Book	Author
January 2	Tuesdays with Morrie	Mitch Albom
January 9	Tuesdays with Morrie	Mitch Albom
January 16	Tuesdays with Morrie	Mitch Albom
January 23	Tuesdays with Morrie	Mitch Albom
January 30	The Rock Says	The Rock with Joe Layden
February 6	The Rock Says	The Rock with Joe Layden
February 13	The Rock Says	The Rock with Joe Layden
February 20	Tuesdays with Morrie	Mitch Albom
February 27	The Rock Says	The Rock with Joe Layden
March 5	Tuesdays with Morrie	Mitch Albom
March 12	Tuesdays with Morrie	Mitch Albom
March 19	Tuesdays with Morrie	Mitch Albom
March 26	Tuesdays with Morrie	Mitch Albom
April 2	Tuesdays with Morrie	Mitch Albom
April 9	Tuesdays with Morrie	Mitch Albom
April 16	Tuesdays with Morrie	Mitch Albom
April 23	Tuesdays with Morrie	Mitch Albom
April 30	Tuesdays with Morrie	Mitch Albom
May 7	Tuesdays with Morrie	Mitch Albom
May 14	Tuesdays with Morrie	Mitch Albom
May 21	Tuesdays with Morrie	Mitch Albom
May 28	Tuesdays with Morrie	Mitch Albom
June 4	Tuesdays with Morrie	Mitch Albom
June 11	Flags of Our Fathers	James Bradley with Ron Powers
June 18	Flags of Our Fathers	James Bradley with Ron Powers
June 25	Flags of Our Fathers	James Bradley with Ron Powers
July 2	Flags of Our Fathers	James Bradley with Ron Powers
July 9	Flags of Our Fathers	James Bradley with Ron Powers
July 16	Tuesdays with Morrie	Mitch Albom
July 23	Tuesdays with Morrie	Mitch Albom
July 30	The Day John Died	Christopher Andersen
August 6	Life on the Other Side	Sylvia Browne with Lindsay Harrison
August 13	It's Not about the Bike	Lance Armstrong with Sally Jenkins
August 20	It's Not about the Bike	Lance Armstrong with Sally Jenkins
August 27	Tuesdays with Morrie	Mitch Albom
September 3	It's Not about the Bike	Lance Armstrong with Sally Jenkins
September 10	Tuesdays with Morrie	Mitch Albom
September 17	Nothing Like It in the World	Stephen Ambrose
September 24	Nothing Like It in the World	Stephen Ambrose
October 1	Nothing Like It in the World	Stephen Ambrose
October 8	Nothing Like It in the World	Stephen Ambrose
October 15	Nothing Like It in the World	Stephen Ambrose
October 22	The Beatles Anthology	The Beatles
October 29	The Beatles Anthology	The Beatles
November 5	The Beatles Anthology	The Beatles
November 12	The O'Reilly Factor	Bill O'Reilly
November 19	The O'Reilly Factor	Bill O'Reilly
November 26	The O'Reilly Factor	Bill O'Reilly
December 3	The O'Reilly Factor	Bill O'Reilly
December 10	The O'Reilly Factor	Bill O'Reilly
December 17	The O'Reilly Factor	Bill O'Reilly
December 24	The Beatles Anthology	The Beatles
December 31	The Beatles Anthology	The Beatles

== See also ==
- Publishers Weekly list of bestselling novels in the United States in the 2000s
