= Silent Honor =

Silent Honor may refer to:

- Silent Honor (novel), a 1996 novel by Danielle Steel
- Silent Honor (TV series), a 2025 Chinese spy drama TV series
