= Daddy (1991 film) =

- British DVD cover
- Also known as: Danielle Steel's Daddy
- Genre: Drama; Romance
- Based on: Daddy by Danielle Steel
- Written by: L. Virginia Browne
- Directed by: Michael Miller
- Starring: Patrick Duffy; Lynda Carter; Kate Mulgrew
- Music by: Dennis McCarthy
- Country of origin: United States
- Original language: English

Production
- Executive producer: Douglas S. Cramer
- Producer: Paul Pompian
- Production location: Los Angeles
- Cinematography: Laszlo George
- Editor: Michael S. McLean
- Running time: 100 minutes
- Production companies: The Cramer Company; NBC Productions

Original release
- Network: NBC
- Release: October 23, 1991

Daddy, also known as Danielle Steel's Daddy, is a 1991 American made-for-television romantic drama film directed by Michael Miller. The film is based upon the 1989 novel Daddy written by Danielle Steel.

== Plot ==
Oliver Watson has never been luckier: he is a successful advertising executive, shares a marriage of twenty years with Sarah, and has three loving kids: 18-year-old Ben, 16-year-old Melissa, and 10-year-old Sam. His perfect life suddenly falls apart when his wife Sarah announces that she wants to enter a graduate school 200 miles away from home, as she regrets that she gave up her bohemian protester's life and promising writing career to become the wife of a conservative traditionalist.

A devastated Oliver tries to prevent her from going and even offers to move with her, but Sarah has made up her mind: she will enroll in college and does not want any company. The children are just as displeased when they find out about their mother's decision, for which Ben and Melissa hold their father responsible. They start acting out as a reaction, which mostly affects Ben. Instead of attending classes and getting good grades, he spends most of his time with promiscuous teenager Bobbi Carver, who becomes pregnant.

Meanwhile, Oliver unsuccessfully tries to save his marriage, until Sarah admits that she is seeing someone else. Meanwhile, his mother's health is worsening, and after months of being kept alive through machines, his father George decides to pull the plug. At the funeral, Sarah shows up to reveal her plans on filing for divorce. Feeling that his life has no purpose there anymore, Oliver accepts a job in Los Angeles. Melissa and Sam move with him, but Ben stays behind with Bobbi and their newly born son Alexander.

In California, Oliver falls in love with Charlotte Sampson, a successful actress in a popular TV series who dreams of a Broadway career. After a short romance, during which she connects with his children, they become engaged. However, when she is offered a role on Broadway, Oliver fears the past is repeating. Rather than seeing his partner slip away due to a long-distance relationship, he breaks off their engagement. Meanwhile, Bobbi suddenly leaves Ben, taking Alexander with her.

Desperate, Ben turns to Oliver, and together they fight successfully for full custody. Afterwards, Ben visits Charlotte, and finds out that she has rejected the Broadway role. Although she is still mad at Oliver for cutting her out of his life, she accepts Ben's invitation to Alexander's christening, and when she and Oliver meet, they reconcile.

== Cast ==
- Patrick Duffy as Oliver Watson
- Lynda Carter as Charlotte Sampson
- Kate Mulgrew as Sarah Watson
- John Anderson as George Watson
- Ben Affleck as Benjamin 'Ben' Watson
- Jenny Lewis as Melissa Watson
- Matthew Lawrence as Sam Watson
- Robyn Peterson as Daphne Hutchinson
- Richard McKenzie as Jeremy Bosworth
- Georgia Emelin as Bobbi Carver
- Peter Hansen as Doctor
