= Hotel Vendome =

Hotel Vendome may refer to:

- Hotel Vendome (Prescott, Arizona), a historic hotel on the National Register of Historic Places
- Hotel Vendome (San Jose, California) in San Jose, California
- Hotel Vendome fire, a 1972 fire in Boston, Massachusetts
- Hôtel de Vendôme (boulevard Saint-Michel, Paris), location of the École nationale supérieure des mines de Paris
- Hôtel de Vendôme (place Vendôme, Paris), a hotel since 1858
- Hôtel de Vendôme (rue Saint-Honoré), a mansion in Paris from 1603 to 1685; demolished to make way for the Place Vendôme
- Hotel Vendome (novel), a 2011 novel by Danielle Steel
