= A Good Woman =

A Good Woman may refer to:

- A Good Woman (novel), a 2008 novel by Danielle Steel
- A Good Woman (film), a 2004 film directed by Mike Barker, based on the Oscar Wilde play Lady Windermere's Fan
- Good Woman (Gladys Knight album), 1991, or the title track
- Good Woman (The Staves album), 2021
- "Good Woman", a song by American country singer Maren Morris from her 2019 album Girl
- "Good Woman", a song by Cat Power on the 2003 album You Are Free

== See also ==
- The Good Wife (disambiguation)
