= Kaleidoscope (novel) =

1987 novel by Danielle Steel

- First edition
- Author: Danielle Steel
- Language: English
- Genre: Romance novel
- Publisher: Delacorte Press
- Publication date: 1987
- Publication place: United States
- Media type: Print (hardback & paperback)
- Pages: 395 pp (first edition, hardback)
- ISBN: 0-385-29594-4 (first edition, hardback)
- OCLC: 15251531
- Dewey Decimal: 813/.54 19
- LC Class: PS3569.T33828 K3 1987

Kaleidoscope is a 1987 novel by Danielle Steel, published by Delacorte Press. It was adapted into the NBC television movie of the same name in 1990 starring Jaclyn Smith and Perry King. It is Steel's 22nd novel.

== Plot ==
The story revolves around three sisters born to a French mother and an American GI father. The father kills the mother and then commits suicide. The story features the events of each girl's life. Separated after the death of their parents, each one is raised quite differently. They are later reunited by an estranged family friend: the lawyer who placed them in the homes where they spent their childhoods. They later find out that he is part of the reason their father killed their mother.
