= Friends Forever (novel) =

2012 novel by Danielle Steel

Friends Forever:A Novel
- First edition
- Author: Danielle Steel
- Language: English
- Publisher: Delacorte Press
- Publication date: July 24, 2012
- Publication place: United States
- Media type: Print (hardback)
- Pages: 320
- ISBN: 0385343213 (978-0385343213)
- Preceded by: Betrayal
- Followed by: The Sins of the Mother

Friends Forever: A Novel is a novel by Danielle Steel, published by Delacorte Press in July 2012. It is Steel's eighty-seventh novel, and (including non-fiction and children's books) her 105th book overall.

== Synopsis ==
This novel tells the story of five friends - Gabby, Billy, Izzie, Andy, and Sean.
