= The Heart of the Matter (disambiguation) =

The Heart of the Matter is a 1948 novel by Graham Greene.

The Heart of the Matter or Heart of the Matter may also refer to:

== Film and television ==
- The Heart of the Matter (film), a 1953 British film based on the 1948 Graham Greene novel
- Heart of the Matter (TV series), a British television debate series, 1979–2000
- The Heart of the Matter (documentary film), a 1994 film about HIV/AIDS in American women
- "The Heart of the Matter" (Grey's Anatomy), a television episode broadcast in 2007
- "Heart of the Matter" (Once Upon a Time in Wonderland), a television episode broadcast in 2014

== Music ==
- The Heart of the Matter (Kenny Rogers album), 1985 album by Kenny Rogers
- "The Heart of the Matter" (song), a 1989 song by Don Henley
- Heart of the Matter (EP), a 2004 EP by The Screaming Jets
- The Heart of the Matter (Triosphere album), 2014 album by Triosphere

== Other uses ==
- Heart of the Matter, a 2010 novel by Emily Giffin
- The Heart of the Matter, a 2013 report and film for The Commission on the Humanities and Social Sciences

== See also ==
- Matters of the Heart (disambiguation)
