= The Long Road Home (novel) =

1998 novel by Danielle Steel

- First edition
- Author: Danielle Steel
- Language: English
- Genre: Romance
- Publisher: Delacorte Press
- Publication date: May 1, 1998
- Publication place: United States
- Pages: 408
- ISBN: 0-385-31956-8

The Long Road Home is a 1998 romance novel written by Danielle Steel. The book was released to commercial success, despite receiving unfavorable critical reviews. It is Steel's 42nd novel.

== Plot ==
Gabriella Harrison, a child of the fifties, suffers abuse from the hands of her mother, Eloise, who explains her abuse as disciplining Gabriella for being so bad. Frequent beatings mar her life. Her father, afraid to annoy her mother, plays a spectator to all the evil happenings. Before Gabbie turns thirteen her father, tired of his wife's constant abuse towards their daughter, leaves. Her mother blames Gabbie for her father's departure. She says it's only because of her badness that her parents hate her. Gabbie is left at a nunnery to finish her education, so her mother can abandon the biggest disappointment in her life.

Gabriella decides she wants to become a nun. In the course of being a postulant, she falls in love with a priest, Father Joe Connors. They want to move into the real world to live their life loving each other, but the priest is not confident. Gabbie is pregnant. The priest commits suicide, for he cannot break the promise made to the brotherhood of serving the needed, and he cannot live without Gabriella. Gabriella thus loses her love, and then their child in a miscarriage. Ultimately she is compelled to leave the convent for the sin committed.

Cast out into society, she is determined to move on and finds an apartment where the tenants welcome her lovingly, particularly an old professor. Everything seems to be going well; Gabbie has a job at a pastry shop, but loses it when she defends a child whose mother dislocates her arm in a fit of impatience. Eventually she finds a job at a book store while buying a Christmas present for her doting friend, the old professor.

Gabbie meets a new tenant named Steve in the boarding house, and eventually falls for him. She has a long relationship with him. He does not have a job and is constantly after Gabbie to give him money. She obliges, until the day he steals from her. He turns out to be a con artist, wanted by the police for stealing money from several people. When she learns this, he demands that she give him most of the money the old professor leaves her when he dies. She refuses to give him any money after learning his true face and that he was responsible for the professor's death. Steve beats her up, nearly killing her. Gabbie is taken to a hospital, where she becomes friends with a Doctor Peter presiding over her. Before moving on with her life with Peter, Gabriella decides to meet her parents and ask them the long avoided question - why they abandoned her and never loved her.

Gabbie visits her father, hoping to get some answers about why he allowed her mother to treat her so horribly. Her father says only that he was weak. Gabbie visits her stepfather and his new wife, where she learns that her mother never changed her bitter ways until the end, and verbally abused her new husband until she died of cancer.

At last, after realizing that it was not her fault that her parents never loved her, Gabbie lets go of the past and moves on with her life with her new love - the doctor by her side.

== Reception ==
Publishers Weekly gave the book an unfavorable review, remarking that "The inevitable happy ending, when it finally arrives, can't make up for a plodding narrative lacking in any real suspense." Kirkus Reviews offered a similar review, stating, "Steel goes to battle with yet another worthy cause, but her good intentions this time fizzle in a sea of Åber-melodrama."
