= Thurston House (novel) =

1983 novel by Danielle Steel

- First edition
- Author: Danielle Steel
- Language: English
- Genre: Romance novel
- Publisher: Dell Publishing Company
- Publication date: 1983
- Publication place: United States
- Media type: Print (hardback & paperback)
- ISBN: 0-7515-0561-7
- OCLC: 32130273

Thurston House is a romance novel by American Danielle Steel. The book was first published on August 4, 1983, by Dell Publishing Company. It is Steel's fifteenth novel.

The plot follows Jeremiah, a self-made, wealthy businessman who is looking for a lady in his life. He meets Camille, a younger woman with whom he has intentions to raise a family. For his growing family, he builds Thurston House, which becomes one of the most symbolic mansions of San Francisco.
