= Undercover (disambiguation) =

Being undercover is the practice of disguising one's identity for the purposes of a police investigation or espionage.

Undercover may also refer to:

== Films ==
- Under Cover (1916 film)
- Undercover (1943 film), a 1943 British war film
- Undercover (OSS training film), a 1943 Office of Strategic Services training film
- Undercover (1983 film), a 1983 Australian film
- Under Cover (1987 film), a film directed by John Stockwell
- Undercover (1991 film), a New Zealand television film.
- Undercover (2024 film), a 2024 film directed by Arantxa Echevarría
- Undercover: Exposing the Far Right

== Television ==
=== Series ===
- Undercover (2013 TV series), a Philippine drama
- Undercover (2015 TV series), a British comedy
- Undercover (2016 TV series), a British miniseries
- Undercover (2019 TV series), a Belgian-Dutch streaming series
- Undercover (Bulgarian TV series), a 2011 crime drama series
- Undercovers (TV series), a 2010 American series that aired on NBC
- Under Cover (1991 TV series), an American series that aired on ABC
- Undercover (2021 TV series), a South Korean series

=== Episodes ===
- "Undercover" (Brooklyn Nine-Nine)
- "Undercover" (Ben 10: Alien Force)
- "Undercover" (Columbo)
- "Undercover!"

== Music ==
=== Groups ===
- Undercover (band), a Christian rock band from the United States
- Undercover (dance group), a UK dance music act

=== Albums ===
- Undercover (Ministry album), 2010
- Under Cöver, 2017 album by Motörhead
- Under Cover (Ozzy Osbourne album), 2005
- Undercover, 2003 album by German band Puhdys
- Undercover (Rolling Stones album), 1983
- Undercover (Paul Taylor album), 2000
- Under Cover (Joe Lynn Turner album), 1997
- Undercover (Tying Tiffany album), 2005
- Under Cover – Chapter One, a 2010 album by Tangerine Dream
- Undercover, a 2017 EP by Sheppard (band)
- Undercover, an EP by the Infamous Stringdusters

=== Songs ===
- "Undercover" (song), by Gemma Hayes, 2006
- "Undercover", a song by Kehlani from SweetSexySavage
- "Undercover", a 2006 song by Pete Yorn from Spider-Man (soundtrack)
- "Undercover", a bonus track included on the iTunes release of Nelly Furtado's 2006 album, Loose
- "Undercover", a song by Selena Gomez from the 2013 album Stars Dance
- "Undercover", a song by Stephanie Mills from the 1984 album I've Got the Cure
- "Undercover", a song by DJ Drama from the 2011 album Third Power

== Literature ==
- Undercover: The True Story of Britain's Secret Police (2012), a non-fiction book by The Guardian journalists Rob Evans and Paul Lewis
- Undercover (novel), a 2015 novel by Danielle Steel
- Under Cover, 1943 exposé of fascism by Arthur Derounian

== Other uses ==
- Need for Speed: Undercover, a 2008 entry in the Need for Speed video game series
- Undercover: Operation Wintersun

== See also ==
- "Undercover of the Night", a 1983 song by the Rolling Stones
- "Under Covers", a 2005 episode of the TV series NCIS
