= The Good Wife (disambiguation) =

The Good Wife is an American television series.

The Good Wife may also refer to:

- The Good Wife (Indian TV series)
- The Good Wife (Japanese TV series), a 2019 remake of the American series
- The Good Wife (film) or The Umbrella Woman, a 1987 Australian film
- The Good Wife (South Korean TV series), a 2016 remake of the American series
- A Good Wife, a 2016 Serbian film
- Goodwife, an archaic polite form of address for women

== See also ==
- A Good Lawyer's Wife, a 2003 South Korean film
- "Good Wife, Wise Mother", an ideology coined by Nakamura Masanao in 1875
- "Good Wife's Guide", a magazine article rumored to have been published in the May 13, 1955 issue of Housekeeping Monthly
- Le Ménagier de Paris, a French medieval guidebook translated at The Good Wife's Guide
- A Good Woman (disambiguation)
