= Season of Passion =

1979 novel by Danielle Steel

Season Of Passion
- First edition
- Author: Danielle Steel
- Language: English
- Genre: Romance novel
- Publisher: Dell publications
- Publication date: 1979
- Publication place: United States
- Media type: Print (Hardback & Paperback)
- Pages: 432
- ISBN: 0-440-17704-9
- OCLC: 10584253

Season Of Passion is a 1979 romantic novel by American Danielle Steel. The book was originally published on June 1, 1979, by Dell Publications, containing 432 pages. It is Steel's fifth novel.

== Synopsis ==
Kate meeting Tom Harper, a well known pro-football star, widely recognised across the United States. When first meeting, they enjoyed their relationship, however, after an attempt at suicide, Tom becomes mentally and physically disabled for the rest of his life, leaving Kate pregnant with his unborn son, as well upset about recent circumstances. However, after a chance at a new relationship and fresh start, Kate realises she will have to leave the past behind, to move forward.
