= Big Girl =

Big Girl may refer to:

== Fiction ==
- Big Girl (film), a 2005 Canadian short film by Renuka Jeyapalan
- Big Girl (novel), a 2010 novel by Danielle Steel
- The Big Girl & Other Stories, a 1964 short-story collection by Alagu Subramaniam

== Music ==
- Big Girl (Candy Dulfer album), 1996, or the title song
- Big Girl (Seyi Shay album), 2021
- "Big Girl (You Are Beautiful)", a 2007 song by Mika
- "Big Girl", a 2000 song by Precocious Brats featuring Kevin & Perry from Kevin & Perry Go Large
- "The Big Girl", a 2018 song by Eureka O'Hara

== See also ==
- "Big Girls", a 1984 song by Electric Pandas
- "Big Girls", a 2009 song by Bow Wow from New Jack City II
