= Zoya (novel) =

1987 novel by Danielle Steel

- First edition
- Author: Danielle Steel
- Language: English
- Genre: Romance novel
- Publisher: Delacorte Press
- Publication date: 1987
- Publication place: United States
- Media type: Print (Hardback & Paperback)
- ISBN: 9780385296496
- OCLC: 695587179

Zoya is a 1987 romance novel by American Danielle Steel. It is Steel's 23rd novel.

== Plot ==
Zoya Konstantinovna Ossupov is a Russian countess, a young cousin to Tsar Nicholas II. Escaping the Russian Revolution with her grandmother and a loyal retainer, she arrives in Paris, penniless, where she must carve a new life for herself and her loved ones. There, she joins Diaghilev's Ballets Russes. Against the wishes of her grandmother, who objects to consorting with those outside her class, she meets and falls in love with American GI Clayton Andrews. After World War I, they marry and move to America, where Zoya faces many joys and hardships in her life. She struggles through the Great Depression and World War II, then meets and falls for millionaire cloth merchant, Simon Hirsch, who later died in another war.

== Adaptation ==
In the Made-for-TV movie version which aired on NBC in September of 1995, Zoya is portrayed by Melissa Gilbert. Her husband, Clayton Andrews, is portrayed by her then-husband Bruce Boxleitner. Zoya's grandmother Evgenia is portrayed by Dame Diana Rigg; Philip Casnoff, David Warner, Denise Alexander and Jennifer Garner also appear.
