= Crossings (miniseries) =

1986 American TV mini series

- Based on: Crossings by Danielle Steel
- Teleplay by: Bill and Jo LaMond
- Directed by: Karen Arthur
- Starring: Cheryl Ladd; Lee Horsley
- Composer: Michael LeGrand
- No. of episodes: 3

Production
- Executive producers: Aaron Spelling; Douglas S. Cramer
- Cinematography: Paul Lohmann
- Editors: Millie Moore; Maurie Beck
- Running time: 269 minutes
- Production company: Aaron Spelling Productions

Original release
- Network: ABC
- Release: February 23 – February 25, 1986

Crossings is a 1986 American TV miniseries based on the 1982 novel of the same name by Danielle Steel. It first aired on ABC.

== Cast ==
=== Starring ===
- Cheryl Ladd as Liane DeVilliers
- Lee Horsley as Nick Burnham

=== Special guest stars ===
- Christopher Plummer as Armand DeVilliers
- Jane Seymour as Hillary Burnham

=== Also starring ===
- Garrick Dowhen as Philip Markham
- Stewart Granger as George Hackett
- Joan Fontaine as Alexandra Markham
- Joanna Pacuła as Marissa Freilich
- Horst Buchholz as Martin Goertz
- Zach Galligan as Robert DeVilliers
