= Now and Forever (1983 film) =

- Directed by: Adrian Carr
- Based on: Now and Forever by Danielle Steel
- Starring: Cheryl Ladd
- Music by: Bruce Rowland
- Release date: 1983
- Country: Australia
- Language: English
- Box office: AU $34,671 (Australia)

Now and Forever is a 1983 Australian drama film directed by Adrian Carr and starring Cheryl Ladd, Robert Coleby and Carmen Duncan. The screenplay concerns a seemingly perfect couple, whose marriage is destroyed when the husband is accused of rape by another woman. It was based on a 1978 novel by Danielle Steel.

== Cast ==
- Cheryl Ladd - Jessie Clarke
- Robert Coleby - Ian Clarke
- Carmen Duncan - Astrid Bonner
- Christine Amor - Margaret Burton
- Aileen Britton - Bethanie
- Alex Scott - Andrew Wundham
- Kris McQuade - Matilda Spencer
- John Allen - Martin Harrington
- Rod Mullinar - Geoffrey Bates
- Kevin Healy - Jock Martin
- Michael Long - William Horton
- Tim Burns - Kent Adams
- Henri Szeps - Barry York
- Redmond Phillips - Judge
- Amanda Ma - Kit
- Sarah De Teliga - Zina
- Ray Marshall - Harvey Green
- Paul Bertram - James Eaton
- Alan Tobin - Wayne Buttery
- Reg Gillam - Magistrate
