= Full Circle (novel) =

1984 novel by Danielle Steel

- US first edition cover
- Author: Danielle Steel
- Language: English
- Genre: Romance novel
- Publisher: Delacorte Press
- Publication date: May 1, 1984
- Publication place: United States
- Media type: Print (hardback & paperback)
- Pages: 323
- ISBN: 0-385-29326-7
- OCLC: 12459978

Full Circle is a 1984 romance novel by American Danielle Steel. It was adapted by Karol Ann Hoeffner into a 1996 television film starring Teri Polo. It is Steel's seventeenth novel.

== Plot ==
Tana Roberts, coming of age in the turbulent 1960s, has ambitions of an important career. Her feelings about love and marriage have been shaped by her mother's role as a married man's longtime mistress.

Tana's only sexual encounter with a male involved her surviving rape at his hands. Combined with what she sees as her mother's intentional dependence on a man (her boss, Arthur Durning) who won't commit to Jean even after his wife dies - at least, not until his failing health means he needs a full-time caretaker, Tana chooses not to be dependent on a man for her happiness in life. It certainly doesn't help Tana's outlook that her rapist is Arthur's son, Billy, and that Arthur has been her de facto step-father throughout her childhood. When Tana tells Jean what happened, Jean calls her a liar.

Leaving New York to attend Green Hill Junior College in South Carolina, Tana rooms with the only African-American student on campus, Sharon Blake. Sharon's brother is lynched, and Sharon herself is later murdered. Following Sharon's death, Tana becomes active in the Civil Rights movement. Her involvement leads to her expulsion.

Back in New York, Tana meets Harry Winslow IV, the polar opposite of Billy Durning - except that they're both rich. Tana's relationship with Harry is platonic, and stays that way even after he returns from Vietnam, much to Jean's displeasure. Harry, though, has feelings for Tana that he never acts on, while she is attracted to Harry's father, Harrison Winslow III. Harrison won't get involved with Tana - even though he's fallen in love with her too - because he's aware of Harry's feelings. Tana enrolls at Berkeley to study law, and also becomes involved with a violent anti-war activist.

Jean implores Tana to get married and have children, but Tana is set on her career. She achieves her goals in record time, too, graduating law school and becoming an ADA in San Francisco in just a few short years, then shortly afterward, a judge. As Harry and his wife celebrate the birth of their first child, Tana finally begins to wonder what family life must be like. Her perspective on happiness begins to turn to the more traditional route her mother has been advocating: marriage to a man. Eventually, she marries the judge who swore her in, Russ Carver.

== Book reviews ==
Steel commented in an interview that she received largely positive reviews for Full Circle and worried that it might hurt her sales, since her numbers seemed to always increase with negative reviews.

Ann DeFrango of The Daily Oklahoman said that the novel's heroine illustrated an archetype with Steel examining the "emergence of independent women" without allowing the book to be weighed down by the serious politics of 1960s America. Carol Iaciofano of the Hartford Courant found the novel lacking, not just in "heart" but also in finesse. Iaciofano felt Tana's characterization was weak and the plot lacked tension. The review calls Steel's writing boring, dull, and vapid by turns that even Steel's fans wouldn't appreciate.

Connie Jo Ozinga of the Seymour Daily Tribune stated that even though she found Steel's story-telling ability to be praise-worthy, Ozinga found Steel's writing "lousy". Ozinga found the inclusion of every aspect of turbulent U.S. history in the 1960s and 1970s to be damaging to the story. She laments that the characters are unrelatable, and stated that this is a phenomenon universally present in Steel's novels. However, she admits that she enjoys contemporary romance despite not believing the works to be "good writing" or "meaningful".

Lucy Taylor of the Richmond Times-Dispatch summed up her opinion of the novel by saying that it was filled with "self-defeating sacrifice". Taylor found the characters too one-dimensional. The lack of complexity was only illustrated by how the characters could be defined as either good people - who are, incidentally, all physically attractive - or bad people, without nuance.

Alice Osborne of The Breese Journal felt the novel brought to light the complexity in social challenges faced by those who had not previously needed to acknowledge them. She felt the story captured the perspective of modern Americans who seek "personal significance" when the idea of obtaining "everything" is fluid. The fluctuation of the meaning is demonstrated in the vastly different opinions of what will bring happiness, at least initially, between Jean and Tana. B.H.H. of The Anniston Star felt that the rapid pace of the tale and the sentimentality employed with blatant cliche would be welcomed by Steel's fans.

Ethel S. Adams of The Fresno Bee likened it to a Mattel toy, with character emotions, dialogue, and motivations being typical fare for a soap opera, though the language used in some places would be censored by the FCC. Gail Smith Wallace of The News & Observer commented that the only real departure from the usual formula was the order in which the heroine attained life goals: rather than love then marriage then career then pregnancy, the 1980s culturally-apropos order would be to have the career first. Wallace also implied that Tana's rape was included not as character development for Tana, but rather to keep readers from feeling any sympathy for either Jean or Arthur.

Diana Ketcham of the Oakland Tribune stated that this book represented Steel's attempt to evolve her writing style, to be considered a novelist rather than just a romance writer. Ketcham acknowledged that the prose is better than Steel's previous novels and that the story is told more through the characters speaking to one another than through simply thinking about one another. Ketcham also pointed out that Steel has attempted to address the serious concerns of a single mother intertwined with the cultural issues of a quickly-changing society. But Ketcham noted that the changes to Steel's usual "fantas[y] of upscale consumerism" made it all-too-easy to point out flaws in the writing, and that the departure from her established formula might alienate Steel's fans.

Francis J. Thompson of The Tampa Tribune-Times notes that Steel comments a great deal on how much her characters cry while admonishing readers not to bother reading the last twenty pages if they've enjoyed weeping themselves. Myrna Lippman of the Asbury Park Press summed up her thoughts by calling the story implausible, employing stereotypes as characters, wrapped in sophomoric prose. Kathleen Kelly of The Wichita Eagle Beacon, on the other hand, described the novel as a pleasant way of willing away a day, refuting the idea that Steel's characters are unrelatable if only because the contemporary nature of her writing means that most readers will feel at least one character is comparable to someone they personally know.

Sue Allison, writing for United Press International, admitted that the sales boon for Steel made for unappealing commentary regarding American readers' literary tastes. Allison also compared the story to daytime melodrama and called it "mindless entertainment". Jacqueline Villa of the Arizona Daily Star disagreed, saying that the story is satisfying because it's a fairy tale with a happy ending and relatable characters. Villa's only complaint was the amount of time that Tana spends crying in the book. Ruth M. White of The Pittsburgh Press simply said that Steel's fans would be pleased with the novel and the happy ending for which Steel was widely known.

Lisa Zeidner of The Philadelphia Inquirer points out that when Harry marries, his wife immediately falls pregnant "and gets fat". This, Zeidner says, is standard commentary used to discourage marriage and pregnancy, to demonstrate to readers why the heroines want to avoid becoming "dull and powerless". Steel's appeal lies in the fact that her stories don't provide escapism; rather, they impress upon the reader that since everything turns out fine for the heroine in the end that their comparably normal lives are also perfectly acceptable.
