= HRH (disambiguation) =

HRH is an abbreviation for His or Her Royal Highness, a style used by high-ranking members of royal families.

HRH or Hrh may also refer to:

- Aligarh Airport, Aligarh, Uttar Pradesh; IATA airport code
- H.R.H. (novel), a 2006 novel by Danielle Steel
- Health human resources, also known as human resources for health
- Hereditary renal hypouricemia, a benign medical condition
- Horsham railway station, West Sussex, England; National Rail station code
- HRH, a Rockwell scale of materials' hardness
- Hudson Regional Health, a hospital network in New Jersey
- Human Resources for Health, a healthcare journal
- Kinney HRH, a 2001 American helicopter
- McDonnell HRH, an unbuilt 1950 American compound helicopter for the US Marine Corps
