= Coming Out (novel) =

2006 novel by Danielle Steel

- First edition
- Author: Danielle Steel
- Language: English
- Publisher: Delacorte Press
- Publication date: June 2006
- Publication place: United States
- Media type: Print (hardback & paperback)
- Pages: 208 pp
- ISBN: 978-0-385-33832-5
- OCLC: 58919953
- Dewey Decimal: 813/.54 22
- LC Class: PS3569.T33828 C66 2006

Coming Out (2006) is a novel by American author Danielle Steel, published by Random House in June 2006. It is Steel's sixty-ninth novel.

== Synopsis ==
Olympia Crawford Rubinstein is a lawyer, wife and mother to twin daughters, a son in college, and one in kindergarten. Her life is perfect, until she opens an invitation for her daughters to attend the most exclusive coming-out ball in New York, and chaos erupts all around her. One twin is outraged while the other is ecstatic. Her husband is appalled. As her family is thrown into disarray, the ball turns out to be a blessing in disguise, as old wounds are healed and the family learn that acceptance and love are all they ever needed.
