= One Day at a Time (novel) =

2009 novel by Danielle Steel

- First edition
- Author: Danielle Steel
- Language: English
- Publisher: Delacorte Press
- Publication date: February 2009
- Publication place: United States
- Media type: Print (hardback & paperback)
- Pages: 336 pp
- ISBN: 978-0-385-34029-8
- OCLC: 232392201
- Dewey Decimal: 813/.54 22
- LC Class: PS3569.T33828 O64 2009

One Day at a Time is a novel by American author Danielle Steel, published by Delacorte Press in February 2009. It is Steel's seventy-seventh novel.

== Synopsis ==
Coco Barrington, the wayward member of a family of Hollywood celebrities, agrees to dog-sit at her successful sister's house. There, she meets Leslie Baxter, a British actor hiding from a vindictive ex with his six-year-old girl. Coco finds love and also reconciliation with the rest of her family, healing old wounds one day at a time.

== List of characters ==
- Coco Barrington: daughter of wealthy dramatic agent Buzz Barrington in Hollywood and best-selling romance novelist mother Florence Flowers
- Jane Barrington: elder sister of Coco, a successful movie producer
- Leslie Baxter: world-famous British movie star who happens to stay at Jane's house while Coco house-sits during her sister's absence
- Ian White: ex-lover of Coco who died and left his Australian shepherd, Sallie
- Florence Flowers: Coco's mother, a successful novelist
- Chloe: daughter of Leslie, living with her mother Monica, an ex-girlfriend of Leslie
- Elizabeth: Jane's gay partner
- Gabriel: Florence's young boyfriend
