= Matters of the Heart =

Matters of the Heart may refer to:

- Matters of the Heart (Tracy Chapman album), 1992
- Matters of the Heart (Bob Bennett album), 1983
- Matters of the Heart (Commissioned album), 1994
- Matters of the Heart (Restless Heart album), 1994
- Matters of the Heart (novel), a 2009 novel by Danielle Steel
- Matters of the Heart (1973 film), a Soviet drama film
- Matters of the Heart (1993 film), a Ghanaian film
- Matters of the Heart (2024 film), a Danish film
