= Safe Harbour (film) =

- DVD cover
- Directed by: Bill Corcoran
- Written by: Edithe Swensen
- Based on: Safe Harbour by Danielle Steel
- Produced by: Daniel Grodnik
- Starring: Melissa Gilbert; Brad Johnson; Liana Liberato
- Cinematography: Curtis Petersen
- Edited by: Evan Talnik
- Music by: Joey Newman
- Production company: Daniel Grodnik Productions
- Distributed by: New Line Home Video
- Release date: October 30, 2007
- Running time: 103 minutes
- Country: United States
- Language: English
- Budget: $2.5M

Safe Harbour (also known as Danielle Steel's Safe Harbour) is a 2007 American direct-to-video romantic drama film directed by Bill Corcoran, based upon the 2003 novel of the same name by Danielle Steel.

Ophelia MacKenzie and her daughter Philippa, recover from the death of her husband and son in a plane crash at a beach house, where Philippa meets handsome divorcé and artist Matt Bowles, who she introduces to Ophelia. A romantic relationship develops between the adults once Ophelia opens up.

== Plot ==
Thirteen-year-old Philippa 'Pip' Mackenzie and her French widow mother Ophelia live in Safe Harbour, San Francisco. Since her husband and their son Chad died in a plane crash, Ophelia has suffered severe grief. Although the marriage was lackluster, she remains emotionally distant from Pip.

While with their dog on the beach, Pip befriends artist Matt Bowles, who gives her drawing lessons. Ophelia angrily accosts him, wary of his motives, threatening to call the police. Matt defuses the situation with an apology.

Her friend Andrea Wilson encourages Ophelia to spend time with Matt. As their relationship grows, he promises to accompany Pip to her school prom, as a father figure.

Matt confides in Ophelia that his ex-wife, Sally, left him with their daughter, Vanessa, for a wealthy colleague and now lives in New Zealand. During a beach walk, Matt rescues a drowning surfer whom Ophelia successfully resuscitates, demonstrating her life-saving skills. Safe Harbour's therapy instructor Blake suggests Ophelia volunteer at the homeless shelter Wexler Center, downtown San Francisco.

Once back in their urban home, Ophelia relapses into depression after entering Chad's bedroom. Pip finds her unresponsive, so calls Matt for help. He comforts Ophelia with his unconventional approach, encouraging her to use her life-saving skills by volunteering at the Wexler Center. There, veteran Lorraine and two ex-cops persuade Ophelia to join their field nights distributing supplies and guiding the homeless toward shelters. Matt objects, fearing Ophelia is not emotionally stable enough for street work.

Vanessa, visits Matt at the beach house after a long estrangement. He had painted Vanessa's portrait from a photograph, as his ex-wife Sally had never given her his letters. Invited by Sally to a hotel, she reveals her wealthy husband has died so attempts to seduce Matt. He rejects her advances, stating they can only be friends.

Just as Ophelia feels ready to let go of Ted and Chad’s belongings, she finds a letter from Andrea in Ted's coat. The letter blames Ophelia for their problems, revealing Andrea was pregnant with his son William. She urged Ted to divorce Ophelia and marry her. Ophelia confronts Andrea, and ends their relationship. Finished with grieving, she volunteers more time with the field agents.

As Matt feared, an unstable homeless man threatens Ophelia with a gun, shoots her thrice, sending her the hospital in critical condition. Matt and Pip hurry there, but cannot see her until morning. The next day, still weak, Ophelia quits at the Wexler Centre. They also overhaul their policies to protect volunteers. Overjoyed, Pip pressures Matt to propose immediately, which Ophelia accepts.

Andrea visits the recuperating Ophelia, apologizing for the affair. Dying of cancer, she asks Ophelia to care for her infant William. She agrees, and they hug.

Ophelia and Matt wed on the beach, Pip cheekily shouts “I do!” for them, and Vanessa smiles.

== Cast ==
- Melissa Gilbert as Ophelia
- Brad Johnson as Matt Bowles
- Liana Liberato as Pip Mackenzie
- Rebecca Staab as Andrea Wilson
- Idalis DeLeon as Millie
- Michael Jace as Jeff
- Kate Vernon as Sally
