= Impossible (novel) =

2005 novel by Danielle Steel

- Author: Danielle Steel
- Language: English
- Publisher: Delacorte Press
- Publication date: March 2005
- Publication place: United States
- Media type: Print (hardback & paperback)
- Pages: 336 pp
- ISBN: 978-0-385-33826-4
- OCLC: 55502741
- Dewey Decimal: 813/.54 22
- LC Class: PS3569.T33828 I48 2005

Impossible is a novel by Danielle Steel, published by Delacorte Press in March 2005. It is Steel's sixty-fifth novel.

== Synopsis ==
Sasha's husband suddenly dies, leaving her widowed without the man she loves. Liam's marriage is falling apart. Sasha has worked her father's art gallery into an intercontinental success, while Liam has become one of the most striking artists of his time. When the two meet and fall in love, Sasha and Liam must protect one another's reputations and hearts from getting hurt again.

Sasha commutes between New York, where her grown children Xavier and Tataina live, and Paris and her two thriving galleries. Then a family tragedy changes his life forever, making him sacrifice his love for Sasha to help his family heal. Their love is so strong that they are drawn together once more into a love that seemed impossible.

== Reception ==
Publishers Weekly criticized the novel for its "sketchy, meandering plot", "skimpy characterizations" and "hyperbolic, often stunningly repetitious style". Kirkus Reviews called it a "notably unsexy romance" with "cartoonish prose and skimpy storyline".
