= Varnish (disambiguation) =

Varnish is a mixture used primarily to coat wood.

Varnish may also refer to:

- Varnish (software), a reverse proxy and HTTP accelerator
- Jessica Varnish, British track cyclist
- Desert varnish, a coating found on exposed rock surfaces in arid environments
- Fluoride varnish, applied to the tooth's surface in dentistry
- Conformal coating, a type of PCB coating

== See also ==
Vanish (disambiguation)
