= Five Days in Paris =

1995 novel by Danielle Steel

Five Days In Paris
- First edition
- Author: Danielle Steel
- Language: English
- Genre: Romance novel
- Publisher: Delacorte Press
- Publication date: 1995
- Publication place: United States
- Media type: Print (hardback & paperback)
- Pages: 269 pp
- ISBN: 0-385-31530-9
- OCLC: 32546750
- Dewey Decimal: 813/.54 20
- LC Class: PS3569.T33828 F54 1995

Five Days In Paris is a 1995 fiction novel by Danielle Steel and published by Delacorte Press. It analyzes honour, integrity and commitment into relationships, as well as hope. The book was a best-seller of Publishers Weekly for eighteen weeks.

== Plot ==
The story follows two Americans, Peter Haskell and Olivia Thatcher, who meet in the Ritz in Paris on the night of a bomb threat. They are from different backgrounds and cultures. Olivia is unhappily married to a leading senator, and Peter has a family and is the president of a pharmaceutical empire.
