= Vanishing =

Vanishing may refer to:

== Entertainment ==
- Vanishing, a type of magical effect.

== Mathematics ==
- The mathematical concept, see root of a function

== Music ==
- "Vanishing" (song), by Mariah Carey
- A song from the A Perfect Circle album Thirteenth Step
- A song by Bryan Adams from Waking Up the Neighbours
- A song by Barenaked Ladies from Barenaked Ladies Are Me

== Art and literature ==
- A Void, 1969 French novel, also translated under the titles A Vanishing and Vanish'd
- Vanishing (2022 film), a French-South Korean film
- The Vanishing (disambiguation), various films and novels

== See also ==
- Vanish (disambiguation)
