= Safe Harbour (novel) =

2003 novel by Danielle Steel

- First edition
- Author: Danielle Steel
- Language: English
- Publisher: Delacorte Press
- Publication date: November 2003
- Publication place: United States
- Media type: Print (hardback & paperback)
- Pages: 336 pp
- ISBN: 978-0-385-33630-7
- OCLC: 49875190
- Dewey Decimal: 813/.54 21
- LC Class: PS3569.T33828 S34 2003

Safe Harbour is a novel written by Danielle Steel and published by Delacorte Press in November 2003. The book is Steel's sixty-first novel. It was adapted into a direct-to-DVD film.

== Synopsis ==
At eleven, Pip Mackenzie has experienced such tragedy leaving her mother inconsolable. As she wanders the beach while her mother is shut up indoors, she stumbles upon Matt Bowles. An artist and divorcee, Pip reminds him of his daughter and they strike up an unusual friendship. Her mother, a French woman named Ophélie, is sceptical at first but soon discovers that Matt has lit up both of their lives.

When the summer comes to an end, Ophélie and Pip leave for the city but find life without Matt painful. As Ophélie begins a volunteer job at a city outreach program for the homeless, she tries to begin the long process of healing. As she is betrayed in the worst way, Matt appears and allows her to be herself and finally see a way through the mist of Safe Harbour.

The novel ends with Matt and Ophélie's wedding in the beach with Pip as the witness at Safe Harbour.

== Characters ==
- Ophélie MacKenzie: Mother of Pip, who is depressed after the death of her son, Chad, and her husband, Ted. She heals by building a close relationship with Matt Bowles and eventually falls in love with him.
- Phillippa Mackenzie: Daughter of Ophélie Mackenzie, who befriends Matt at Safe Harbour
- Matthew Bowles: A lonely divorcee who befriends Pip at Safe Harbour
- Andrea Wilson: Ophélie's best friend, godmother of Pip
- Ted MacKenzie: Ophélie's late husband, who died in a plane crash, leaving an enormous fortune
- William: Andrea's infant son
