= The Klone and I =

1998 novel by Danielle Steel

- First edition
- Author: Danielle Steel
- Language: English
- Genre: Romance
- Publisher: Delacorte Press
- Publication date: June 1, 1998
- Publication place: United States
- Media type: Novel
- Pages: 232
- ISBN: 978-0-385-32842-5
- Website: http://daniellesteel.com/blog/the-klone-and-i/

The Klone and I: A High Tech Love Story is a 1998 novel by American author Danielle Steel. It is Steel's 42nd novel, which peaked at No. 2 on The New York Times Best Seller list.

== Background ==
According to Steel, the idea originated from correspondence between her and Tom Perkins, who she would later marry. Steel said that the idea became a joke between them and wrote it as a Christmas present for him.

After their divorce, Perkins claimed that the idea for the book had been his.

== Plot ==
The novel centers around 41-year-old Stephanie, whose husband divorces her and sues her for alimony and child support at the beginning of the novel. Stephanie spends the next year improving herself, and travels to Paris where she meets Peter Baker, a fellow American who is an executive of a bionics company. After spending the weekend together, Stephanie is sure she will never see him again, but he follows her to the Hamptons and they fall in love. While Peter is away on business, his clone, Paul Klone, shows up on her doorstep. Paul is an exact physical replica of Peter, but the polar opposite from him in every other way.

== Style ==
The novel deviates from Steel's normal work by adding a science fiction element. Publishers Weekly remarked that the novel still retained much of Steel's typical romance genre elements, and did not take the science fiction too far, remarking that the novel was "approximately one part Ray Bradbury to 35 parts Steel".
