= Southern Lights (novel) =

2009 novel by Danielle Steel

- First edition
- Author: Danielle Steel
- Language: English
- Publisher: Delacorte Press
- Publication date: October 2009
- Publication place: United States
- Media type: Print (hardback & paperback)
- Pages: 336 pp
- ISBN: 978-0-385-34028-1
- OCLC: 303041974
- Dewey Decimal: 813/.54 22
- LC Class: PS3569.T33828 S65 2009

Southern Lights is a novel by American author Danielle Steel, published by Delacorte Press in October 2009. It is Steel's seventy-ninth novel.

== Synopsis ==
Alexa Hamilton left the South behind after her husband's betrayal and his family's cruelty. As an assistant D.A. in Manhattan, she is a top prosecutor and a single mother to a teenage daughter. When her latest case brings threatening letters to her seventeen-year-old daughter, Savannah, Alexa is certain that her client, Luke Quentin, is behind it. Making the most painful decision of her life, she sends her daughter back to her southern roots to protect her from harm.

Savannah settles into the southern life, enjoying her father and family again as her mother battles in Manhattan. Alexa and Savannah come to heal old wounds and find love again under the southern lights.
