= Amazing Grace (novel) =

2007 novel by Danielle Steel

- First edition
- Author: Danielle Steel
- Language: English
- Publisher: Delacorte Press
- Publication date: October 2007
- Publication place: United States
- Media type: Print (hardback & paperback)
- Pages: 336 pp
- ISBN: 978-0-385-34023-6
- OCLC: 85766669
- Dewey Decimal: 813/.54 22
- LC Class: PS3569.T33828 A43 2007

Amazing Grace is a novel by Danielle Steel, published by Delacorte Press in October 2007. It is Steel's seventy-third novel.

== Plot ==
At a charity dinner in San Francisco, the Ritz-Carlton ballroom is ravaged by the largest earthquake in the city since 1906. In the aftermath, four stranger's lives are entwined.

Sarah Sloane's life falls apart when her husband, a hedge fund entrepreneur, is exposed as a fraudster when the power outage prevents him from hiding his illegal financial maneuvers. Following her on-stage performance at the charity event, 19-year-old Grammy winner Melanie Free ditches her platform shoes and escapes her domineering mother to assist disaster victims. The two women are comforted by nun Sister Maggie Kent, who is managing a refugee camp while trying to conceal her feelings of love from her new friend, photographer Everett Carson, who is covering the devastating impact of the quake.

At a refugee camp, all four come together and become a support system for the others as life starts to resemble normality.

== Reception ==
A review in Publishers Weekly said, "Steel delivers a sparkly story with an uplifting spiritual twist." Booklist called it "Typical Steel fare", noting that "this is a fast, uncomplicated read". Calling the characters, particularly Maggie, "paper-thin", Kirkus Reviews opened that "Similar to a fast-food meal, the book won't meet daily nutritional requirements and just might leave you with a bellyache."
