= Second Chance (Steel novel) =

2004 novel by Danielle Steel

- Author: Danielle Steel
- Language: English
- Publisher: Random House
- Publication date: June 2004
- Publication place: United States
- Media type: Print (hardback & paperback)
- Pages: 240 pp
- ISBN: 978-0-385-33635-2
- OCLC: 52341389
- Dewey Decimal: 813/.54 21
- LC Class: PS3569.T33828 E53 2004

Second Chance is a novel by Danielle Steel, published by Random House in June 2004.

== Synopsis ==
Editor-in-chief of a successful fashion magazine, Fiona Monaghan lives a high flying life, flitting between cities following her passion for fashion. Fiona is content to live her life with only her dog, Sir Winston, who shares her bed until she meets John Anderson.

After a whirlwind romance over several continents, Fiona opens up her heart for John, a widowed father of two young adult daughters. As the two plan their life together, it all begins to unravel disastrously. From being hated by John's two daughters to ruining a business dinner with John's biggest client, their relationship seems doomed. Then a surprise event gives them a second chance.
