= Echoes (Steel novel) =

2004 novel by Danielle Steel

- Author: Danielle Steel
- Audio read by: Simon Prebble
- Language: English
- Publisher: Random House
- Publication date: October 2004
- Publication place: United States
- Media type: Print (hardback & paperback)
- Pages: 336 pp
- ISBN: 978-0-385-33634-5
- OCLC: 53001441
- Dewey Decimal: 813/.54 22
- LC Class: PS3569.T33828 E23 2004

Echoes is a novel by American author Danielle Steel, published by Random House in October 2004. It is Steel's sixty-fourth novel.

The audiobook is read by British-American narrator Simon Prebble.

== Synopsis ==
In the summer of 1915, Beata Wittgenstein, daughter of a rich German-Jewish banking family, meets and falls in love with Antoine de Villerand, a young Catholic French army officer on leave in Switzerland. She follows her heart to be with him against the wishes of her Jewish Orthodox family and decides to live with him in Switzerland until World War I ends. Both their families disown them, and Beata's parents sit shiva for her. She becomes a Catholic to marry Antoine.

After the war, she goes back to Germany with her husband Antoine and her two-year-old daughter Amadea. They begin a peaceful life and after eight years, she has her second daughter, Daphne. Antoine has a good position in charge of a horse farm at a schloss owned by an army friend of his. He inherits his father's title and estate, but dies soon after and his fortune as a Count is passed on to Beata, now 'Madame la Comtesse'.

Beata returns to Cologne, her home town. She still attends church but begins to visit synagogue on Yom Kippur, in the hope of meeting, and being reconciled with, her parents. They meet but they reject her, and her mother is the only person to secretly meet her.

Amadea decides to become a Carmelite nun and commences her period of training for this calling. On Kristallnacht, the Wittgenstein bank and home are looted; the family is arrested and transported to the Dachau concentration camp, never to be heard from again.

Beata is accidentally betrayed by a former family servant and arrested. She and Daphne are transported to Ravensbruck concentration camp, from which they never return.

Amadea has stayed in the convent, but is still forced into hiding as her friends disappear without a trace. She is moved for her safety, but arrested and sent to Terezin concentration camp. She survives for several months and escapes with the help of a German soldier who says she loves her. When he tries to rape her, she accidentally kills him and flees into the forest. She is found, more dead than alive, by Czech Partisans.

They help to move to France, where she lives in a country farmhouse. She becomes involved with the work of the local resistance movement, and in time heads the local cell. A French boy, Jean-Yves, falls in love with her, but he is killed in a sabotage operation.

She continues her work and meets a British secret agent, Colonel Rupert Montgomery, with whom she carries out several highly dangerous missions into Paris and even into Germany. She is badly injured, not expected to live, and evacuated to a hospital in Britain.

Now using a wheelchair, she moves to Rupert's home in Sussex and takes care of a group of child evacuees who came on the Kindertransports and live in Rupert's ancestral home.

As the war draws to its close, Amadea and Rupert marry. Amadea begins to understand the ways of life and how love can echo through the generations.
