= Daddy (novel) =

1989 novel by Danielle Steel

- First edition cover.
- Author: Danielle Steel
- Language: English
- Genre: Novel
- Publisher: Delacorte Press
- Publication date: October 1, 1989
- Media type: Print (Hardback & Paperback) & Audio Book (Cassette)
- Pages: 352 pages (first edition, hardback)
- ISBN: 0-385-29766-1 (first edition, hardback)

Daddy is a 1989 novel by American Danielle Steel. It is Steel's 25th novel.

== Synopsis ==
Secretly, though Sarah has always longed for more than to be just a mother. She and Oliver married young and she became pregnant on their honeymoon. She began planning for an abortion until Oliver found out and was thrilled about the baby. At the time they were living in a small New York apartment and Benjamin had colic quite badly and was driving Sarah nuts. When Benjamin was only a year old though Sarah discovered she was pregnant again, and again planned for an abortion. Oliver fought her on it again, and their daughter Melissa was born. With their apartment growing smaller by the day, they bought their house in Purchase, not far from Oliver's parents, and Sarah concentrated on driving car pools, PTA, and taking the children to various activities. When Melissa was five and Benjamin nine, Sarah discovers she is pregnant again, as the result of the vacation she and Oliver took. Beyond upset, she plans for an abortion with her family doctor who asks how Oliver feels about what she's doing and she admits he doesn't know she's pregnant. He insists she talk to Oliver before the procedure is performed and again he is thrilled about the baby and horrified that she would consider an abortion. They fight about it for several days but in the end she keeps the baby, and reassures him daily that she will not care about it. Oliver promises to love it for both of them, and baby Sam is born on Election Day. Several years pass and the children are ten, fifteen, and seventeen, and Sarah receives a letter in the mail notifying her of her acceptance to Harvard graduate school. Although the school is in Boston and they live in New York, Sarah decides to leave her family and move to Boston, promising to visit on weekends. The family is understandably upset, and more so when weeks go by and Sarah does not return for a visit. Oliver is working late nights and not getting home until 9 o'clock at night, and the kids are left in the care of Agnes, the housekeeper.

Losing control of his children's behavior, Oliver decides to take a rental apartment in New York city so he can get home to his children sooner at night. He arranges to close the house and applies to prestigious New York schools for the three kids. This proves difficult for Benjamin, who has always been a straight A student and has let his grades slip drastically because he is spending all of his time with his girlfriend, a high-school dropout named Sandra Carter. The children are upset when told about the move to New York, and Benjamin flat out refuses. When Oliver questions why, Benjamin informs him that Sandra is pregnant. Oliver realizes the conception occurred right around Christmas, and Sarah's departure from the family.

Benjamin drops out of high school to take care of her. He has two jobs, one pumping gas, and the other as a bus boy. Oliver, the children, and Agnes go ahead and move to New York, and when summer comes the children go to Europe with Sarah and her new live in friend, Jean Luc, and Oliver has his first relationship with a woman he meets on the train, Megan Townsend.

But Megan ends up breaking Oliver's already fragile heart. By then, Oliver is afraid to love but then he falls for the superstar Charlotte who turns his pathetic life upside down.
