= Against All Odds (novel) =

2017 novel by Danielle Steel

- First edition
- Author: Danielle Steel
- Audio read by: Dan John Miller
- Language: English
- Genre: Romance
- Publisher: Delacorte Press, Random House Publishing Group
- Publication date: May 2, 2017
- Publication place: United States
- Pages: 354
- ISBN: 9781101883938
- Preceded by: Dangerous Games
- Followed by: The Duchess

Against All Odds is a 2017 novel by American writer Danielle Steel. The story follows Kate Madison and her family. The title comes from the idea that she cannot keep her children from "playing against the odds" in their choice of romantic partners.

The novel peaked at No. 3 on the New York Times Best Sellers List.

== Characters ==
- Kate Madison - A mother and a businesswoman. Kate's husband died years ago, leaving her with four small children and an uncompleted education. Years later, she became a successful businesswoman.
- Bernard Michel - A French man and Kate's love interest
- Isabelle - Kate's confident lawyer daughter who falls for a client, Zach Holbrook, that she is representing in a criminal case
- Zach Holbrook - A drug dealer who has recently been cut off from his trust fund and refuses to get a real job
- Willie - Kate's youngest son
- Julie - Kate's daughter. A meek fashion designer who abandons her career and moves across the country to be with her new husband
- Justin - Kate's son and Julie's twin. He is a writer and the most together of Kate's children. He and his partner Richard deal with the struggles of parenthood.
- Peter - Julie's husband. He was perfect before the marriage, then started to mistreat Julie.

== Plot ==
The book revolves around Kate Madison, a widow who owns a successful retail shop in SoHo. She is dedicated to her four adult children, but grows frustrated with their choice of partners that are seemingly not right for them. She learns to allow her children to make their own decisions, and be there for them unconditionally.

Kate also has a brief love affair of her own, falling for the Frenchman Bernard Michel. However, she later finds out that he is married, and realizes she is in the same position of choosing an ill-suited partner as her children.

== Reception ==
James Kidd of the South China Morning Post gave the book two out of five stars, stating that the novel was propelled more by the heroine's children then the heroine herself, and that much of the novel consists of the protagonist contemplating "her brood’s stupidest decisions as if they are Nobel Prize acceptance speeches." Kidd concluded his review by adding "It's OK, if predictable."

Marilyn Gore of The Free Press Journal criticized the novel for its slow beginning and called the writing "phoned-in." She also criticized the novel for its lack of character development, saying, "These horrible partners — the deadbeat druggie manchild, the abusive future murderer and the cheat — come off as caricatures rather than rounded characters."

Travelling Through Words has given it a 3.5 stars out of 5. The reviewer stated: "Even though the book was really slow in the beginning, I did end up liking it. I was really interested in what was happening with the characters and wanted the best for them. I definitely recommend this book if you looking for a slow-burn family book."

Shelf Reflection gave it a negative review, saying: "This book did not interest me. It only evoked frustration, eye rolls, and silent beggings of 'No... just please... don't do that...' But that's just one man's opinion."
