= Passion's Promise =

1977 novel by Danielle Steel

Passion's Promise/Golden Moments
- First edition
- Author: Danielle Steel
- Language: English
- Genre: Romance novel
- Publisher: Dell Publishing
- Publication date: 1977
- Publication place: United States
- Media type: Print (hardback & paperback)
- Pages: 380 pp
- ISBN: 0-440-12926-5
- OCLC: 271965492

Passion's Promise, also published under the title Golden Moments, is a 1977 novel by American author Danielle Steel. It is Steel's second novel.

== Synopsis ==
Kezia Saint Martin is a glamorous, jetsetting socialite with a secret identity as a crusading social justice journalist. She is increasingly torn between the two worlds and questions her own identity. These questions are brought to a head when she falls in love with a fellow crusader named Lucas John.
