= Sisters (Steel novel) =

2007 novel by Danielle Steel

- First edition
- Author: Danielle Steel
- Language: English
- Publisher: Delacorte Press
- Publication date: February 2007
- Publication place: United States
- Media type: Print (hardback & paperback)
- Pages: 352 pp
- ISBN: 978-0-385-34022-9
- OCLC: 70292157

Sisters is a novel by American author Danielle Steel, published by Delacorte Press in February 2007. It is Steel's seventy-first novel.

The audiobook is narrated by American actor Sam Freed.

== Synopsis ==
Candy, a supermodel; Tammy, a successful TV producer; Sabrina, an ambitious lawyer; and Annie, the artist are four sisters who leave their successful lives to care for one another and their father after their mother is killed in a car accident and Annie's sight is taken from her.

The sisters move into a brownstone and try to rebuild their lives out of the ashes of a painful death. As each sister finds new purpose and new loves, they begin to learn that family is the most important thing in life. This revelation cements their bond forever.
