= Bungalow 2 =

2007 novel by Danielle Steel

- First edition
- Author: Danielle Steel
- Language: English
- Publisher: Delacorte Press
- Publication date: June 26, 2007
- Publication place: United States
- Media type: Print (hardback & paperback)
- Pages: 352 pp
- ISBN: 978-0-385-33831-8
- OCLC: 70107161

Bungalow 2 is a novel by Danielle Steel, published by Delacorte Press in June 2007. It is Steel's seventy-second novel.

== Synopsis ==
Writer Tanya Harris loves her life as a mother and wife living in Marin County, but has always wanted the chance to write a major Hollywood screenplay. When the chance arises, her husband encourages her to take the once-in-a-lifetime offer.

Working in Hollywood with the Oscar-winning producer Douglas Wayne is intoxicating for Tanya, especially when he sets his sights on her. Struggling to cope with the movie and her family, Tanya feels her family needs her less, and one opportunity after another leads her away from her old life and into this new world.
