= Dangerous Games (Steel novel) =

2017 novel by Danielle Steel

- Author: Danielle Steel
- Language: English
- Genre: Romance
- Publisher: Delacorte Books
- Publication date: December 5, 2017
- Publication place: United States
- Pages: 307
- Preceded by: The Mistress
- Followed by: Against All Odds

Dangerous Games is a 2017 political-thriller romance novel by author Danielle Steel. The book centers on 39-year-old Alix Phillips, a television reporter who is investigating claims made against the vice president of the United States. The novel has an international setting and takes place in cities across the world, including a chapter which takes place in New Delhi, India.

The novel made it onto the Los Angeles Times' Best Sellers List, and peaked at No. 2 on the New York Times' Best Sellers List.

== Plot ==
Alix Phillips is a widowed single mother of a 19-year-old daughter, Faye. Now that her daughter is in college, Alix can take on lengthier and more dangerous assignments. She sets out to expose government corruption, and ends up embarking on an international journey. While uncovering the political underworld, she falls for her cameraman, Ben Chapman, who is an ex-Navy Seal. They uncover secrets of the past mixed with love.

== Reception ==
Pam Norfolk of the Lancashire Post called the book a "page-turning political thriller, a gripping story of corruption, ambition, power and international intrigue."
