= The House (novel) =

2006 novel by Danielle Steel

- First edition
- Author: Danielle Steel
- Language: English
- Publisher: Delacorte Press
- Publication date: February 2006
- Publication place: United States
- Media type: Print (hardback & paperback)
- Pages: 352 pp
- ISBN: 978-0-385-33828-8
- OCLC: 60856211
- Dewey Decimal: 813/.54 22
- LC Class: PS3569.T33828 H675 2006

The House is a novel written by American author Danielle Steel, published by Delacorte Press in February 2006. It is Steel's sixty-eighth novel.

== Synopsis ==
Overlooking San Francisco, a huge mansion in need of repair is viewed by Sarah Anderson, an estate lawyer, who has just inherited a huge fortune from a deceased client with the intention of spending it on something that she desires. Sarah restores the mansion, drawn to its grandeur and beauty with the help of architect Jeff Parker, who is as passionate about the house as she. As the two work together, they fall in love with the house and then each other as the house touches both of them and opens their hearts once more.
