= Crossings (Steel novel) =

1982 novel by Danielle Steel

- First edition
- Author: Danielle Steel
- Language: English
- Publisher: Delacorte Press
- Publication date: 1982
- Publication place: United States
- Media type: Print (Hardcover)

Crossings is a 1982 novel that was written by American Danielle Steel. It is Steel's 13th novel. It was adapted into a six-hour miniseries of the same name in 1986.

== Plot ==
The ship Normandie makes a voyage from Washington, D.C. to France despite an impending war. Aboard the ship is American Liane de Villiers, the young wife of an old ambassador to France.
