= Toxic Bachelors =

2005 novel by Danielle Steel

- First edition
- Author: Danielle Steel
- Language: English
- Publisher: Delacorte Press
- Publication date: October 2005
- Publication place: United States
- Media type: Print (hardback & paperback)
- Pages: 336 pp
- ISBN: 978-0-385-33827-1
- OCLC: 56590761
- Dewey Decimal: 813/.54 22
- LC Class: PS3569.T33828 T69 2005

Toxic Bachelors is a novel by Danielle Steel, published by Delacorte Press in October 2005. It is Steel's sixty-seventh novel.

== Synopsis ==
The main characters are Charlie Harrington, a philanthropist with high expectations in women; Adam Weiss, a celebrity lawyer who likes young, fun women for short-term purposes; and Gray Hawk, an artist who is drawn into troubled relationships.

Every year they cruise the Mediterranean on Charlie's yacht together until they each find love. Charlie falls in love with a social worker who is far from his ideal woman. Adam gets involved with a young but smart woman whilst Gray falls for a businesswoman and mother.

Leading up to their subsequent cruise, the circumstances of each man have changed since the previous year. Following new romantic relationships and personal developments, the group undergoes a change from their former social habits toward long-term committed partnerships.

== Background ==
The phrase "Toxic Bachelor" was coined by Sex and the City writer Candace Bushnell's original "Sex & The City" columns in the New York Observer and used in the first episode: "(Freeze frame, subtitles read: Peter Mason – Advertising Executive – Toxic Batchelor; Aired 06/06/'98.
