= Rogue (novel) =

2008 novel by Danielle Steel

- First edition
- Author: Danielle Steel
- Language: English
- Publisher: Delacorte Press
- Publication date: June 2008
- Publication place: United States
- Media type: Print (hardback & paperback)
- Pages: 320 pp
- ISBN: 978-0-385-34025-0
- OCLC: 178282029
- Dewey Decimal: 813/.54 22
- LC Class: PS3569.T33828 R64 2008

Rogue is a novel by American author Danielle Steel, published by Delacorte Press in June 2008. It is Steel's seventy-fifth novel.

== Plot summary ==
Maxine Williams is a well-known child psychiatrist, specializing in trauma and suicide, with three children, Daphne, Jack and Sam, and a rich ex-husband. Blake Williams, one of the richest men in the world, has a life of globe-traveling and dating women, while Maxine stays in Manhattan looking after their children and pursuing the career she loves. Though divorced, they remain affectionate to each other.

Blake soon meets the beautiful Arabella and falls deeply in love. Max starts dating a doctor, Charles. However, Charles is uncomfortable with the children and suggests that they be sent to a boarding school. The eldest one, Daphne, starts becoming possessive of her parents, and behaves rudely to Arabella and Charles.

When a tragedy strikes in Morocco, Blake and Max help the victims and orphaned children. Blake transforms into a responsible man, much to Max's surprise. Blake throws Arabella out after she deceives him. Max and Charles plan to marry soon, but Max finds herself happy only in Blake's company, while Charles constantly hurts Blake by behaving rudely. After a series of hilarious events, Max and Blake marry again, much to the delight of their kids.
