= Vanish =

Vanish may refer to:

- Vanish (toilet cleaner), a toilet bowl cleaner by S.C. Johnson
- Vanish (stain remover), a brand of cloth cleaning product by Reckitt
- "Vanish" an episode of the TV series Criss Angel Mindfreak
- Vanishing, a type of magical effect
- Vanish (mathematics), said of a mathematical function that gives the value a zero at some argument (a root of the function)
- Vanish (computer science), a project at the University of Washington to protect online personal data
- Vanish (film), a 2015 American thriller film stylized as VANish
- Vanish (comic), a 2022 series published by Image Comics

== See also ==
- Forced disappearance
- Vanished (disambiguation)
- Vanishing (disambiguation)
- Varnish (disambiguation)
