= Family Ties (novel) =

2010 novel by Danielle Steel

- First edition
- Author: Danielle Steel
- Language: English
- Publisher: Delacorte Press
- Publication date: June 22, 2010
- Publication place: United States
- Media type: Print (hardback)
- Pages: 336
- ISBN: 0-385-34316-7 (9780385343169)

Family Ties is a novel by Danielle Steel, published by Delacorte Press in June 2010. The book is Steel's eighty-first novel.

== Synopsis ==
The novel follows 42-year-old architect Annie Ferguson.
