= Sunset in St. Tropez =

2003 novel by Danielle Steel

- First edition
- Author: Danielle Steel
- Language: English
- Publisher: Delacorte Press
- Publication date: June 3, 2003
- Publication place: United States
- Media type: Print (hardback & paperback)
- Pages: 213
- ISBN: 0-440-23675-4
- OCLC: 52470743

Sunset in St. Tropez is a novel by Danielle Steel, published by Dell Publishing on June 3, 2003. It is Steel's fifty-fifth novel. The plot follows tales of friendship concerning three couples, who have been friends all their lives. However, when they go on holiday together to St. Tropez, they discover untold secrets and revelations.

== Plot ==
Diana and Eric Morrison are a couple residing in a Central Park apartment in New York City who celebrate the new year with their friends: Pascale and John Donnally and Anne and Robert Smith. During their new year celebrations, they agree to go on a summer vacation together to St. Tropez. However, shortly after the new year, Robert's wife, Anne, suddenly dies, and Robert hesitates whether to join his friends on the planned summer vacation. After much persuasion, he agrees to accompany them, inviting a younger film actress to accompany him as his guest. At first, the actress is not accepted kindly by the women, although the men appear to take a liking to her.

The plot analyzes forgiveness and the ability to move on throughout life, despite some of the circumstances the couples have endured.
