= Going Home (Steel novel) =

Novel by Danielle Steel

- First edition
- Author: Danielle Steel
- Language: English
- Genre: Romance
- Publisher: Nelson Doubleday
- Publication date: 1973
- Publication place: United States

Going Home (1973) is the first novel written by the American author Danielle Steel.
