= Honor Thyself =

2008 novel by Danielle Steel

- First edition cover
- Author: Danielle Steel
- Language: English
- Publisher: Delacorte Press
- Publication date: February 2008
- Publication place: United States
- Media type: Print (hardback & paperback)
- Pages: 336 pp
- ISBN: 978-0-385-34024-3
- OCLC: 123119674
- Dewey Decimal: 813/.54 22
- LC Class: PS3569.T33828 H66 2008

Honor Thyself is a novel written by Danielle Steel and published by Delacorte Press in February 2008. It is Steel's 74th novel. It is a courageous journey of survival, memory, and self-discovery.

== Plot summary ==
Actress Carole Barber has come to Paris to work on her new novel and to find herself. Her taxi speeds into the fiery grasp of a terrible terrorist explosion, causing her to be left unconscious and unidentified in a Paris emergency room for weeks

Carole’s friends and family begin to make inquiries into her disappearance, only to find that Carole is far from home and fighting for her life. Her family and friends swarm to the hospital and pray for her recovery, only to find she has amnesia and doesn't remember her own family, Gradually, Carole recovers her memory and develops her social relationships over the course of the story

== Reception ==
In a mostly positive review, Publishers Weekly said, "Though the message is murky at best, Steel delivers a sympathetic heroine and a scene or two that makes the heartstrings quiver." Booklist reviewer Carol Haggas praised the book, writing, "Faithful readers will be catapulted by Steel's staccato pacing and straightforward prose to a predictable yet satisfying conclusion." Alice D. Harris of The Stuart News agreed with this view, stating, "Steel's faithful fans will enjoy Honor Thyself and its predictable happy ending."
