= Hotel Vendome (novel) =

2011 novel by Danielle Steel

- First edition
- Author: Danielle Steel
- Language: English
- Publisher: Delacorte Press
- Publication date: November 1, 2011
- Publication place: United States
- Media type: Print (hardback)
- Pages: 338
- ISBN: 0385343175

Hotel Vendome is a novel by Danielle Steel, published by Delacorte Press in November 2011. It is Steel's eighty-fifth novel, and (including non-fiction and children's books) her 103rd book overall.

== Plot ==
This novel tells the story of Hugues Martin, a graduate of the prestigious École hôtelière de Lausanne in Switzerland. He owns the Hotel Vendome, an illustrious hotel located on the Upper East Side of Manhattan in New York City.
