= Vanished (novel) =

1993 novel by Danielle Steel

- Author: Danielle Steel
- Language: English
- Genre: Romance
- Publisher: Delacorte Press
- Publication date: 1993
- Publication place: United States
- Pages: 312
- ISBN: 0-385-30603-2

Vanished is a 1993 romance novel by American author Danielle Steel, published by Delacorte Press. It follows a young woman in the 1930s, Marielle Delauney, whose four-year-old child with her second husband is kidnapped, with her ex-husband being one of the prime suspects. It received mixed critical reviews, but was one of the best selling novels of 1993 in the United States according to Publishers Weekly.

== Plot ==
Primarily set in New York City the 1930s, Vanished follows a young woman named Marielle Delauney, the mother of a four-year-old-child, Teddy, with her second husband, a businessman named Malcolm Patterson. Marielle's first husband, Charles Delauney, became violent towards her after their first son died by drowning, which also caused her to have a miscarriage. She was sent to an insane asylum, which she does not tell Malcolm about after her release. When Teddy is kidnapped shortly after Marielle meets Charles again, Charles is arrested as the prime suspect.

== Publication history ==
Vanished is Steel's 31st novel, published by Delacorte Press on August 16, 1993. Its first printing was one million copies.

It was adapted into a made-for-TV film called Vanished in 1995 on NBC, starring George Hamilton, Lisa Rinna, and Robert Hays.

== Reception ==
Vanished received mixed critical reviews. Much of the positive critical attention it received was for its plot, intrigue, and ease of reading. The Richmond Times-Dispatch's Elizabeth D. Dickie wrote that reception to Steel's novels was divided between those who are fans of her and those who are not, while the latter are unable to understand the former. Dickie overall considered Vanished to be worthwhile, especially for Steel's frequent fans, with a focus on the quality of the story's ending; at the same time, she criticized its slow start, "two-dimensional" characters, and writing that was "still in need of serious editing". Reception towards the main character of Marielle Delauney was mixed, being seen as both a strong and sympathetic victim enduring in the face of hardship, and as a passive victim who would not stand up for herself; The Spectator's Judy Pollard Smith wrote that it was "bothersome and regressive" that a character like Marielle could potentially be seen as a role model. Besides Marielle, the supporting characters were generally seen as unconvincing and two-dimensional, and the dialogue was criticized for attempting to seem more credible by adding a high amount of profanity. Despite this, critics agreed that it would be popular among fans, sell well, and be adapted into a made-for-tv movie, which it was in 1995, two years later.

Vanished was a best-seller when it was released, reaching number six on Publishers Weekly's annual bestsellers list for 1993.
