= Big Girl (novel) =

2010 novel by Danielle Steel

- First edition
- Author: Danielle Steel
- Language: English
- Publisher: Delacorte Press
- Publication date: February 23, 2010
- Publication place: United States
- Media type: Print (hardback)
- Pages: 336
- ISBN: 0-385-34318-3 (9780385343183)

Big Girl is a novel by Danielle Steel, published by Delacorte Press on February 23, 2010. It is Steel's 80th novel.

== Synopsis ==
Jim and Christine marry at an early age. From the beginning, their morals are dubious. Jim wants them to have a baby boy. Christine also wants a boy, but only because her husband does. They try, but end up having a girl. She is born to a narcissistic father who is obsessed with looks and money, and a food- and fitness-obsessed housewife who plays bridge, and who seems to exist to agree with her husband. Both parents are disappointed in their baby girl from the moment she is born. They name her "Victoria", for Queen Victoria — not because, as Victoria believed as a child, she was a queen in her father's eyes, but because the picture Victoria saw of her namesake depicted a "fat and ugly old woman, who resembled one of the dogs she posed with".

As she grows older, Victoria is referred to as a "genetic throwback" to Jim's great-grandmother, known for her overweight, matronly figure, fair looks and "large nose", rather than resembling her dark-haired, dark-eyed parents. Constantly bullied by her parents about her weight, everything changes for Victoria at seven years old when her mother has another baby. It is another girl they name Grace, whom Victoria calls "Gracie". Even though Gracie receives constant favouritism, praise, and adoration, Victoria shows no jealousy and is obsessed with doing everything for her sister from the moment she is born. As the girls grow up, their love for each other is stronger than ever, despite the constant remarks their parents make about Victoria's weight, her chosen career as a teacher, and lack of a husband or boyfriend.

Victoria moves to New York and lands a job at a prestigious school, although her parents still criticize her. There she gains few, but good friends. She tries a few tentative relationships, all of which fail. She blames this on her being "too fat, too clever and unlovable", parroting her parents' beliefs. She sees a psychiatrist, and works through some of her problems, but always returns to eating when upset. When Victoria finds out her sister is engaged to a rich, controlling fiancé, Victoria begins to worry her younger sister will turn into her parents.

In the end, Victoria finally confronts her parents about their past emotional abuse.
