= Silent Honor (novel) =

1996 novel by Danielle Steel

- First edition
- Author: Danielle Steel
- Language: English
- Genre: Romance novel
- Publisher: Delacorte Press
- Publication date: 1996
- Publication place: United States
- Media type: Print (Hardback & Paperback)
- Pages: 353 pp
- ISBN: 0-385-31301-2
- OCLC: 34576683
- Dewey Decimal: 813/.54 20
- LC Class: PS3569.T33828 S57 1996

Silent Honor is a novel written by Danielle Steel, published in 1996. The plot follows Hiroko, an eighteen-year-old who leaves Japan to live with her uncle in California, United States, after making a difficult decision based on her needs and her father's beliefs. However, when Pearl Harbor is bombed, she becomes an enemy in the American community. The book was published by Delacorte Press.

== Plot summary ==
In August, 1941, Hiroko visits the United States from Japan, as she has an uncle, aunt, and cousins living there. Upon first arrival, she settles in well and continues to lead a regular life, however, on December 7, 1941 — Pearl Harbor is bombed, thus making them an enemy in their community and across the USA, as they are considered foreigners. Ordered to stay by her father, she remains occupied in California, however, the military are ordered to remove all Japanese citizens, and she ends up being put in a detention centre, having to fight to stay alive.

== Reception ==
Publishers Weekly comments about the book that "Steel's slapdash prose and stereotypical characterization produce a formulaic tale, albeit more earnest and didactic than her usual fare".
