= Undercover (novel) =

2015 book by Danielle Steel

- Author: Danielle Steel
- Audio read by: Alexander Cendese
- Language: English
- Genre: Romance
- Publisher: Random House, Delacorte
- Publication date: August 27, 2015
- Publication place: United States
- Pages: 384
- ISBN: 978-1455833580
- Preceded by: Country
- Followed by: Precious Gifts

Undercover is a 2015 novel by American author Danielle Steel. The novel details a romance between a former DEA agent, Marshall Everett, and a fashion editor, Ariana Gregory, who meet in Paris.

The novel peaked at No. 8 on the New York Times Best Sellers List.

== Plot ==
Ariana Gregory, the daughter of a recently widowed US ambassador, arrives in Paris a year after being kidnapped in Buenos Aires. There she meets Marshall Everett, a former undercover DEA agent. Ariana's safety now depends on one man - Marshall.

== Reception ==
The novel received mixed reviews from critics. Ann-Maree Lourey of the New Castle Herald praised the story's gripping plot and pointed out its similarities to the Patty Hearst kidnapping. However, Lourey also criticized Steel's writing style, commenting, "I am still waiting for Steel to learn to write, as opposed to being able to come up with stories. Surely she should realise by now that her writing is extremely stilted in any and every novel that she writes?"
