= Now and Forever (novel) =

1978 novel by Danielle Steel

- First edition
- Author: Danielle Steel
- Language: English
- Genre: Romance novel
- Publisher: Dell Publishing
- Publication date: February 1978
- Publication place: United States
- Media type: Print (hardback & paperback)
- Pages: 432 pp
- ISBN: 0-440-11743-7
- OCLC: 3856470

Now and Forever is a romance novel, written by American Danielle Steel and published on 1978 by Dell Publishing. It is Steel's third novel.
