= Matters of the Heart (novel) =

2009 novel by Danielle Steel

Matters Of The Heart
- First edition
- Author: Danielle Steel
- Language: English
- Publisher: Delacorte Press
- Publication date: June 2009
- Publication place: United States
- Media type: Print (hardback & paperback)
- Pages: 352 pp
- ISBN: 978-0-385-34027-4
- OCLC: 241305006
- Dewey Decimal: 813/.54 22
- LC Class: PS3569.T33828 M38 2009

Matters of the Heart is a novel by American author Danielle Steel, published by Delacorte Press in June 2009. It is Steel's seventy-eighth novel.

== Synopsis ==
Hope Dunne lives in a chic SoHo loft, content with her life as a top photographer. When she accepts a London assignment at Christmas to photograph a world-famous writer, she never expects to fall in love. The charming Finn whisks her away to his palatial Irish estate.

Hope finds Finn irresistible. But soon cracks begin to appear in his stories: Gaps in his history, a few innocent lies, and bouts of jealousy unnerve her. Suddenly Hope is both in love and deeply in doubt, and ultimately frightened of the man she loves. Is it possible that this adoring man is hiding something even worse? The spell cast by a brilliant sociopath has her trapped in his web, too confused and dazzled to escape, as he continues to tighten his grip on her.
