= Ransom (Steel novel) =

2004 novel by Danielle Steel

- First edition
- Author: Danielle Steel
- Audio read by: Ron McLarty
- Language: English
- Publisher: Delacorte Press
- Publication date: February 2004
- Publication place: United States
- Media type: Print (hardback & paperback)
- Pages: 336 pp
- ISBN: 978-0-385-33632-1
- OCLC: 52268917
- Dewey Decimal: 813/.54 21
- LC Class: PS3569.T33828 R37 2004

Ransom is a novel by Danielle Steel, published by Random House in February 2004.

The audiobook was read by Ron McLarty.

== Plot ==
Peter Morgan is released from a Californian prison after four years with plans to make up to the daughters he left behind. Carl Waters, a convicted murderer, is also freed at the same time. In San Francisco, a police detective Ted Lee arrives home to a wife he no longer loves. In the Pacific Heights neighbourhood, Fernanda Barnes cries at the amount of debt her husband has left her and his children in after his death.

Soon, all their lives are connected as Fernanda's child is kidnapped and held for the ransom of a fortune that she does not have. As she and the police fight against time to get her child back safely, something happens that will change their lives forever when their lives are held for Ransom.

== Reception ==
The book was on The New York Times Best Seller list, and received reviews from publications including Publishers Weekly and Kirkus Reviews.
