= Good Wife's Guide =

Fake magazine article

The "Good Wife's Guide" is a magazine article rumored to have been published in the May 13, 1955 issue of Housekeeping Monthly, describing how a good wife should act, containing material that reflects a very different role assignment from contemporary American society. The text and supposed scan of the article have been widely circulated via email. Lack of confirming evidence has cast significant doubt on its origins. The list is very similar to the advice written in the book, 'Fascinating Womanhood' by Helen B. Andelin, published in 1963.

== Authenticity ==
Investigations found this to be a hoax. According to snopes.com, the wording "The Advertising Archives" located on the right side of the image suggests a fraud, since the Archives itself was not started until 1990. Additionally, the image used is claimed to be from a 1957 cover of John Bull magazine. The "Good Wife" version of this image appears to be cropped just below where the textbox containing the words "WOMAN AT THE WHEEL" appeared on the John Bull cover image. Finally, when viewed with increased contrast, square boxes are seen around all the listed points. This would only be made if created digitally and then selectively copied into the seen "magazine" format. One source claims that the text of this article has been circulating since at least the 1980s via fax. Others have claimed that the article is real. However, there was no magazine called Housekeeping Monthly; also, the fact that the article mentions "light him a fire" brings into question its authenticity; even in 1950 many houses did not have open fires.

The text of the article is as follows:

- Have dinner ready. Plan ahead, even the night before, to have a delicious meal ready on time for his return. This is a way of letting him know that you have been thinking about him and are concerned about his needs. Most men are hungry when they get home and the prospect of a good meal is part of the warm welcome needed.
- Prepare yourself. Take 15 minutes to rest so you'll be refreshed when he arrives. Touch up your make-up, put a ribbon in your hair and be fresh-looking. He has just been with a lot of work-weary people.
- Be a little gay and a little more interesting for him. His boring day may need a lift and one of your duties is to provide it.
- Clear away the clutter. Make one last trip through the main part of the house just before your husband arrives. Run a dustcloth over the tables.
- During the cooler months of the year you should prepare and light a fire for him to unwind by. Your husband will feel he has reached a haven of rest and order, and it will give you a lift too. After all, catering to his comfort will provide you with immense personal satisfaction.
- Minimize all noise. At the time of his arrival, eliminate all noise of the washer, dryer or vacuum. Encourage the children to be quiet.
- Be happy to see him.
- Greet him with a warm smile and show sincerity in your desire to please him.
- Listen to him. You may have a dozen important things to tell him, but the moment of his arrival is not the time. Let him talk first – remember his topics of conversation are more important than yours.
- Don't greet him with complaints and problems.
- Don't complain if he's late for dinner or even if he stays out all night. Count this as minor compared to what he might have gone through at work.
- Make him comfortable. Have him lean back in a comfortable chair or lie him down in the bedroom. Have a cool or warm drink ready for him.
- Arrange his pillow and offer to take off his shoes. Speak in a low, soothing and pleasant voice.
- Don't ask him questions about his actions or question his judgment or integrity. Remember, he is the master of the house and as such will always exercise his will with fairness and truthfulness. You have no right to question him.
- A good wife always knows her place.

== Cultural usage ==
NCIS Season 2 Episode 2 "The Good Wives Club" makes extensive reference to this alleged document.

== See also ==
- Culture of Domesticity
- The Compleat Housewife or Accomplish'd Gentlewoman's Companion, an actual English cookbook and how to manual
- The Stepford Wives
- Urban Legends Reference Pages
