= Special Delivery (novel) =

1997 novel by Danielle Steel

- First edition
- Author: Danielle Steel
- Language: English
- Publisher: Delacorte Press
- Publication date: June 25, 1997
- Publication place: United States
- Media type: Print (Hardback)
- Pages: 224
- ISBN: 0385316917

Special Delivery (1997) is a romantic novel written by Danielle Steel.

== Plot summary ==
Danielle Steel explores finding love when, and from whom you least expect it in Special Delivery. Jack Watson was a man hardened to the idea of love. The death of his one true love followed by a messy divorce led him content to lead the ultimate bachelor's life. Written about in the society pages, and despite his reputation, he never had trouble finding a date. It didn't hurt that he owned one of the most successful women's boutiques in Beverly Hills. Amanda Robbins was a successful actress who had already claimed an Academy Award when she met her husband Matthew Kingston and fell in love. Amanda gave up her acting career to be a devoted mother of two children. Her husband Matthew wasn't interested in a working wife and Amanda was happy to oblige, until his sudden death from a heart attack. With the center of her life suddenly gone Amanda fell into despair and depression.

Jack and Amanda didn't travel in the same social circles however, the marriage of their children, Paul and Jan, created an undeniable connection. In the past, while Jack and Amanda were cordial with one another they didn't go out of their way to spend much time together. One day Jan offers to take Amanda to one of Jack's infamous parties. Amanda surprises herself when she accepts and has a great time. This sparked a new beginning as she and Jack began spending more time together, initially just to talk about their children. However, they soon discover that they have more than just children in common. This new relationship helps Amanda heal from the loss of her husband and causes Jack to realize that life isn't as fulfilling when alone. An unexpected pregnancy nearly destroys their love, but ultimately brings them closer together. They end up seeing this new life as an opportunity to support Jan and Paul who have had trouble conceiving. At the last moment Jan finds out she's pregnant and have decided not to adopt Amanda and Jack's baby.

Interwoven throughout Special Delivery are the stories of family challenges for both the Robbin's and the Kingston's. Tension between Amanda's daughters, the difficulties of starting a family, and healing from loss are all included as Jack and Amanda fall in love with each other and learn how to make their families stronger in times of need.

== Reception ==
The novel was not well received by critics.
