= Betrayal (Steel novel) =

2012 novel by Danielle Steel

- First edition
- Author: Danielle Steel
- Language: English
- Publisher: Delacorte Press
- Publication date: March 27, 2012
- Publication place: United States
- Media type: Print (hardback)
- Pages: 338
- ISBN: 0385343191

Betrayal is a novel by Danielle Steel, published by Delacorte Press in July 2012. It is Steel's eighty-sixth novel, and (including non-fiction and children's books) her 104th book overall. It reached number 3 on the New York Times hardback fiction bestsellers list. It is also available in audio book, read by Renee Raudman.

== Plot ==
The novel tells the story of film director Tallie Jones, a Hollywood legend who experiences betrayals from the people she least expects.

Tallie is 39 years old. She is a successful director with critically acclaimed films. She has great relationships with her aging father and lawyer, Sam Jones; her daughter in college, Maxfield; her boyfriend of four years and film producer, Hunt; and her personal assistant of seventeen years and best friend since film school, the glamorous Brigitte.

Her accountant Victor Carson tells her that she has been losing $25,000 monthly for the last three years. Tallie doesn't understand how this how this has been happening, since she fully trusts her personal assistant, Brigitte, to take care of everything. Victor thinks someone may be embezzling money from her. Tallie confronts Brigitte, who says that Hunt has been asking for cash, as well as cheating on Tallie for a year.

Tallie feels that Hunt and Brigitte have never been truthful to her. She hires a private investigator to verify Brigitte's story. The PI does find that Hunt has been involved with a woman named Alice for a year, and that she is pregnant. It also emerges that Hunt and Brigitte had been having an affair for three years before Alice came into the picture. Tallie is deeply hurt, and confronts Hunt. He admits to the relationship, and tells her that he is about to marry Alice.

Tallie hires Jim, an FBI agent, to investigate the missing money. He finds that Brigitte has been embezzling. Tallie decides to fire Brigitte.

Brigitte shoots and kills Hunt; she is sentences to eighteen years in prison.

Tallie tries to recover from these events, and Jim helps her during the healing process. Romance blossoms, and they end up getting married.

== Reception ==
Publishers Weekly called it "absurd" and attacked its cardboard characters, suggesting it was strictly for fans of her earlier work. The Star (Malaysia) found it over-long and repetitive. The Bangkok Post acknowledged its lack of literary value but called it a good read.
