= The Vanishing =

The Vanishing may refer to:

- The Vanishing (novel), a psychological thriller novella written by Dutch author Tim Krabbé
  - The Vanishing (1988 film), a 1988 thriller film based on the Krabbé novella
  - The Vanishing (1993 film), a 1993 English-language remake of the 1988 film
- The Vanishing (2018 film), a 2019 British psychological thriller drama film directed by Kristoffer Nyholm
