= H.R.H. (novel) =

2006 novel by Danielle Steel

- First edition
- Author: Danielle Steel
- Language: English
- Publisher: Delacorte Press
- Publication date: October 2006
- Publication place: United States
- Media type: Print (hardback & paperback)
- Pages: 336 pp
- ISBN: 978-0-385-33829-5
- OCLC: 62525234
- Dewey Decimal: 813/.54 22
- LC Class: PS3569.T33828 H74 2006

H.R.H. is a novel written by Danielle Steel and published by Delacorte Press in October 2006. It is Steel's seventieth novel.

== Synopsis ==
Princess Christianna's father, the reigning prince of Lichtenstein, has secure plans for Christianna's life, which is a burden almost unbearable to her.

After years at Berkley in America, Christianna returns home and realizes she cannot deal with the political responsibilities of being a princess without feeling useless. Wanting to change the ways of the world, she volunteers for the Red Cross in East Africa.

At an international relief camp, she finds her calling and a new love in the form of Parker Williams, a doctor from Doctors Without Borders. As they work together, she tries to hide her feelings and identity from him, until, in one shocking moment, her life changes forever.

In a shocking turn of events, Christianna must reevaluate every decision she has ever made concerning her royal life. The rules began to change. Can she rule her country or will she say no?
