= Place Vendome =

Place Vendome may refer to:

- Place Vendôme, a square in the 1st arrondissement of Paris, France
- Place Vendôme (film), a 1998 French film
- Place Vendome (band), a rock band
  - Place Vendome (Place Vendome album), their 2005 debut album
- Place Vendôme (Swingle Singers with MJQ album), a jazz album by the Swingle Singers and the Modern Jazz Quartet (1966)
- Place Vendôme Mall, a shopping mall in Qatar
