= Vanished (1995 film) =

- Promotional poster
- Genre: Drama; Romance
- Based on: Vanished by Danielle Steel
- Written by: Kathleen Rowell
- Directed by: George Kaczender
- Starring: George Hamilton; Lisa Rinna; Robert Hays; Maurice Godin
- Music by: François Dompierre
- Countries of origin: United States; Canada
- Original language: English

Production
- Executive producer: Douglas S. Cramer
- Producer: Christopher Morgan
- Production location: Montreal
- Cinematography: Pierre Mignot
- Editor: Debra Karen
- Running time: 96 minutes
- Production companies: NBC Productions; The Cramer Company

Original release
- Network: NBC
- Release: April 3, 1995

Vanished, also known as Danielle Steel's Vanished, is a 1995 American made-for-television romantic drama film directed by George Kaczender and starring George Hamilton, Robert Hays and Lisa Rinna. The film is based on the 1993 novel of the same name by Danielle Steel.

== Plot ==
Marielle is happily married to Charles Delauney, and they have a four-year-old son together, Andre. After being visited by Marielle's parents, who warn her about Charles, Marielle, Charles and Andre go on holiday in Switzerland. While Marielle is being greeted by a neighbor, Andre tries to get his ball from the lake and ends up drowning. Charles blames Marielle, and she ends up having a nervous breakdown.

Two years later, Charles visits her in a hospital and tells her he still loves her, and although she confesses she loves him too, she says they can't rebuild the past. They divorce, and Marielle begins a new life in New York. There, she meets Malcolm Patterson, the only person to employ her. After showering her with gifts and romantic meals, Malcolm proposes, and after much persuasion she accepts. Shortly after they are married, Malcolm and Marielle begin trying for a baby and when she is unable to conceive, Malcolm is clearly angry. She attempts to tell him about her past but he doesn't listen, and tells her never to think about the past. Three months later, she visits him at the office and is introduced to his new secretary, Ms. Saunders. She announces she is pregnant.

Malcolm hires a nanny for Marielle, much to her annoyance. When their son Theodore is born, the nanny insists that consistency is important in Teddy's life. Malcolm begins preparing a train set for Christmas. Marielle attempts to tell him about the anniversary of her first son's death, but he cuts her short. The next day, she goes to church and lights a candle for Andre alone, however bumps into her ex-husband Charles there. They talk about the past and share a hug, which is witnessed by her chauffeur. The next day, Marielle takes Teddy to the park and once again, sees Charles. He is angry that Marielle didn't mention having another son, and says it's not fair that she has a husband, a new life and a son and he has nothing. He then asks her if she'd go to the ends of the earth to find someone she loved, and she hurries off.

That night she is on the phone to Malcolm and hears something upstairs. She tells Malcolm who tells her not to worry. After they end the phone call she goes upstairs anyway and sees the nanny gagged and tied up, and discovers Teddy is missing. While the house is being searched, detective John Taylor questions the servants and the chauffeur tells about how he saw Marielle with Charles. John then questions Marielle and Malcolm listens, stunned, while she tells about her past. Marielle insists it isn't in Charles's nature to hurt a child. The police search Charles's house and find Teddy's blue pyjamas there. He is arrested on suspicion of kidnap. Marielle goes to the police station and Charles insists he didn't kidnap Teddy.

In court, all the evidence seems to be pointing to Charles. However, outside John Taylor reveals to Marielle that Malcolm knew all about her past. It is later revealed that Malcolm kidnapped his own son - he had been having an affair with Ms. Saunders and that he was going to start a new life with her and Teddy, and that he'd only married Marielle to get a baby, as Ms. Saunders was infertile. Marielle and Malcolm divorce, and John reveals he loves Marielle as she prepares to begin a new life with Teddy in Vermont.

== Cast ==
- George Hamilton as Malcolm Patterson
- Lisa Rinna as Marielle Delauney
- Robert Hays as John Taylor
- Maurice Godin as Charles Delauney
- Alex D. Linz as Teddy
- Daniela Akerblom as Brigitte Saunders
- Ron Lea as Tom Armour
- Domini Blythe
- Zachary Carmel
- Jason Cavalier
- Andree Cousineau
- Lawrence Dane
- Susan Glover
- Robert Higden
- Matt Holland
- Richard Jutras
- Victor Knight
- Sheena Larkin
- Cary Lawrence
- Charles Mignault
- Albert Millaire
- Eleanor Noble
- Erwin Potitt
- Philip Pretten
- Sharman Sturges
- Vlasta Vrána
- Kenneth Welsh
- Ted Whittall
- Richard Zeman

== Production ==
The film played on NBC, opposite CBS' coverage of the 1995 NCAA Division I men's basketball tournament final game, held in Seattle on April 3, 1995. Including miniseries, it was the fourteenth Steel novel to be produced by NBC for television.

Rinna's inclusion was the first time a daytime television star had been chosen for a Steel film. Due to the contract that Rinna had with Days of Our Lives and the time that she was approached to play the role, she had initially been told by the Days production team that she wouldn't be able to take the role in Vanished as she would be in breach of contract. Eventually, the situation was resolved with NBC's involvement. Of the film, Rinna stated that audiences who enjoy the daytime soaps would appreciate it.

The role of Malcolm Patterson was still considered to be a rare TV performance for Hamilton.

== Reception ==
The film received largely negative reviews.

Tony Scott for Variety stated that the plot was contrived and the film predictable in its progression while admitting that fans of the films made from Steel's novels would appreciate it. The reviewer was critical of the heroine, Marielle Delauney, and despite their apparent dislike of the character, of Rinna's portrayal, though they seemed more than pleased with Hamilton's performance. While commenting that Hays "deserved better" and describing Brigitte as "smashing", indicating their approval of Akerblom's acting skill, they didn't spare the other aspects of the film. The directing was described as indifferent and the teleplay itself as "skim[ming] over the hollow storyline". Overall, the characters were described as cardboard, but the music was considered to be appropriate to the "soapy goings-on".

David Hiltbrand of People magazine stated that the plot borrowed from the Lindbergh kidnapping and tried to mix in the feeling of Alfred Hitchcock. It described the show as shallow and unrealistic, adding that the music felt "intrusive", and compared the drama to "I Can't Believe It's Not Butter!" commercials. The reviewer gave the film a D+ grade.

Bonnie Melleck writing for Vancouver's The Province, described it as an alternative to the NCAA basketball game for anyone who enjoyed a "deliciously messy movie plot", asserting that there are both men and women who enjoy the installments of Steel's novels turned into TV films.

Gail Pennington the Dayton Daily News claimed that watching the film was worse than watching the basketball game, calling the plot both "implausible and unpleasant". Pennington states that Rinna's range is missing and Godin has a pivotal role but that he'd "[made] himself insignificant" while saying that Hamilton was "born to play" the role of Patterson.

Kirk Nicewonger of The Anderson Independent-Mail described the film as inane and predictable, with not much else to say beyond describing the plot and stating that Hamilton did the best he could with the script he was given.

Steven Scheuer for the Wisconsin State Journal gave a positive account of Rinna's and Hamilton's performances while remaining largely silent on the rest of the film.

In 2000, The Radio Times Film Guide stated that the characters were cardboard, though it did acknowledge Kaczender's attempt to make the "melodramatic tosh and its cardboard characters" believable. By 2004, the Guide referred to the film as "tiresome viewing".
