= Hotel Vendome (Prescott, Arizona) =

Historic hotel in Prescott, Arizona

- U.S. National Register of Historic Places
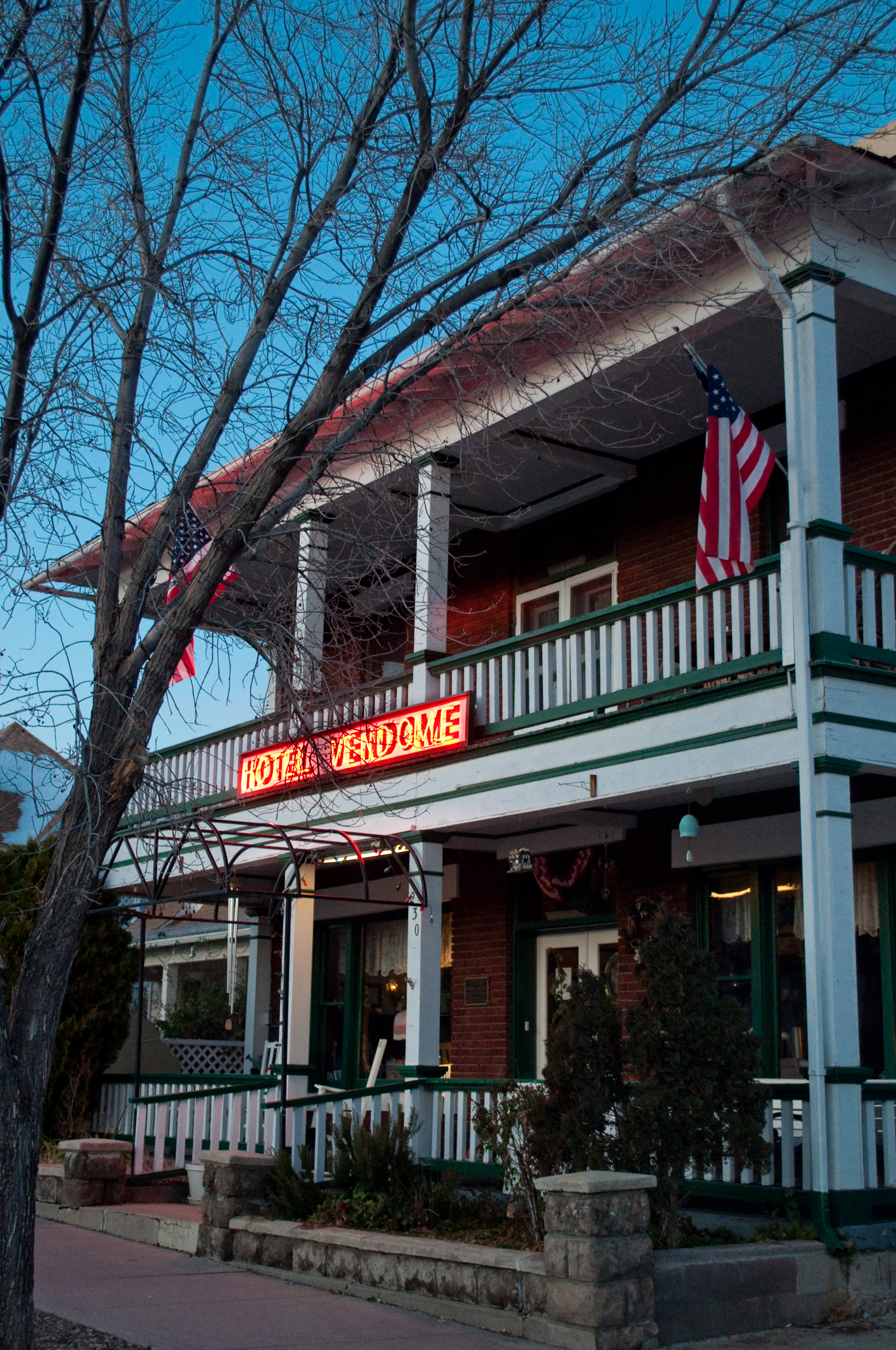
- Front view of hotel

- Location within Arizona Location within the United States
- Nearest city: Prescott, Arizona
- Coordinates: 34°32′20″N 112°28′06″W
- Architectural style: Colonial revival
- NRHP reference No.: 83003495
- Added to NRHP: November 25, 1983

The Hotel Vendome is a historic hotel located in Prescott, Arizona. Built in 1917, it was added to the list of National Register of Historic Places in 1983.

== History ==
The site of the hotel was located on lot 9, block 20 of the original Prescott Townsite. The first record of the property still in existence was the issuance of a deed for the lot to Dr. Thaddeus P. Seeley in 1872, who had been the post surgeon at nearby Fort Whipple. Seeley sold the property in 1876 for $250 to William W. Hutchinson, who served on the Yavapai County Board of Supervisors. He built a large 2-story Victorian house on property, which also included the adjoining lot 11. After Hutchinson's death in 1886, and his wife remarried, to W.T. Richardson. The Richardson's sold the house to Henry D. Ross in 1895 for $3000. Ross was a respected jurist who became Chief Justice of the Arizona Supreme Court. Ross sold the property in 1906 to John S. Hagler, who in turn sold the property in 1910 to Woodville H. Williams for $2000. Sometime between 1901 and the sale in 1910, the large house built by Hutchinson was demolished, and a smaller house was constructed on lot 11, with lot 9 remaining vacant.

In 1917 Prescott had become the center for many industries in the state, including mining, ranching, farming, tourism, as well as being known as a health resort for people with respiratory conditions. The city had several hotels, including the Hotel Prescott, Hotel St. Michael (the largest hotel at that time), Congress Hotel, and the Head Hotel. However, the growing city had a housing shortage, particularly for visitors. That year a cowboy and rancher named J.B. (Jack) Jones brought property from Williams, including the house on lot 11 and vacant lot 9. In response to the housing shortage, he built a two-story hotel made of red brick on the vacant land. Jones' house was next door to that of Morris Goldwater, who would serve several terms as mayor of Prescott, and was the uncle to Barry Goldwater. Jones borrowed $12,000 from the Commercial Trust and Savings Bank, which was owned by his next-door neighbor, Goldwater. The hotel was finished by November 1917.

Upon opening, the hotel was advertised as "attractive small hotel (with) 30 rooms and 16 baths, wide verandas upstairs and down, attractive lobby, hot and cold water in all rooms, night and day phone service with buzzers in all rooms, excellent steam heat, free parking, one-half block from Plaza." The original rates were $1.50 per night for a single and $2.50 for a double. The hotel underwent a renovation during the 1980s, which allowed the property to keep many of its original features, while giving its amenities an upgrade.

In 1924 Jones exchanged the hotel for 156 acres of ranchland north of Prescott with Henry Brinkmeyer, who also owned the Brinkmeyer Hotel on Montezuma Street. Brinkmeyer sold the hotel to Egbert K. and Florence Dutcher in May 1927, who would own the hotel until June, 1946, when they sold it to Dixon Fagerberg. It was during the 1910s and 1920s that Tom Mix was a frequent guest of the hotel, while he was filming westerns in and around Prescott.

Fagerberg owned the hotel until his death in 1956. He left the hotel, and much of his estate, to the Salvation. Due to probate, the Salvation Army did not take possession until 1958, when they sold it after a few months to Olga and John Porvaznik for approximately sixteen thousand dollars, who found that the hotel had descended in condition during several years of poor maintenance. The Porvazniks made the necessary repairs to the hotel to bring it back up standards. In 1971 the Porvazniks sold the Vendome to Eric and Julieta Torp for approximately forty-five thousand dollars.

== Current property ==
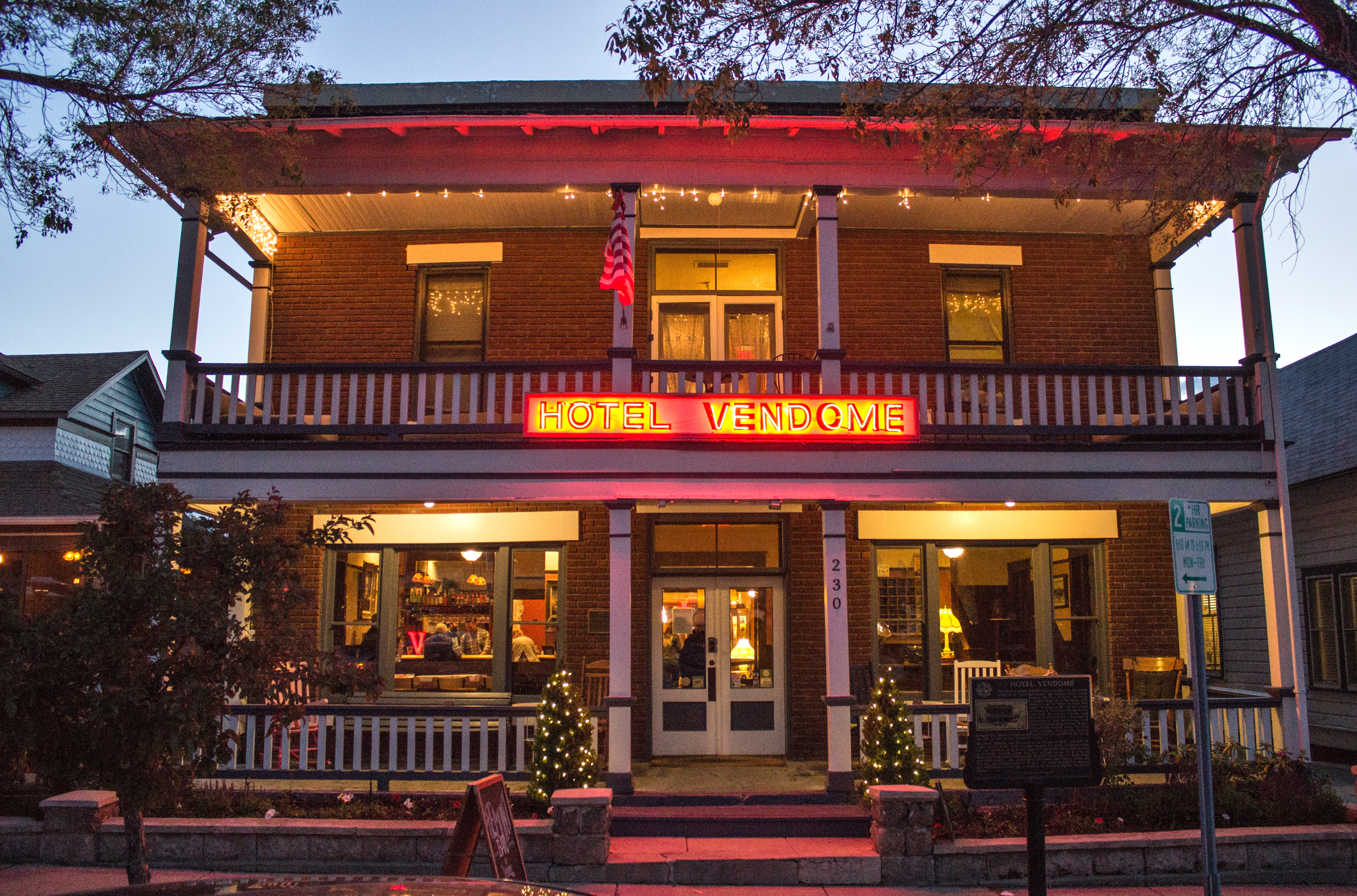
The hotel in the evening

The hotel is a rectangle, 36 feet in width by 123 feet in depth, facing east on Cortez Street. The exterior walls are triple wythe red brick masonry, with two entrances, the main to the east and rear entrance facing to the west. Both entrances are centered on their walls. The front of the building has two large picture windows flanking the main double doors, and feature cast-in-place concrete lintels. The front of the building has a dark red, wire-cut brick facade topped with a brick cornice displaying a course of repeating corbels. There is a front porch, as well as a front veranda, and there is an original sign over the front porch which is painted on wood, and has a neon overlay for nighttime display. The interior has all the original Douglas fir wainscoting, as well as the original 5 panel fir wood doors, all with working transoms. There is a Douglas fir staircase in the main lobby leading to the second floor. There are fourteen rooms on the first floor and sixteen rooms on the second floor. While the building now has air conditioning, the heating is provided by the original cast iron radiators. The original hotel annunciator is still located in the lobby on the wall behind the front desk.

Many of the original features remain, including clawfoot tubs, iron radiators used for heating in the colder months, and its ornate woodwork. There are two exterior lounging areas: a veranda on the second floor, and a front porch replete with rocking chairs. The first floor also offers a small bar, BarVendome, which serves champagne, wine, beer, and non-alcoholic drinks. During certain seasons it also features sangria and mulled cider. In 2019, U.S. News & World Report ranked the property one of the eight best hotels in Prescott.

The structure is architecturally significant since it is the only unaltered two story structure in Prescott built during the early 20th century for the purpose of visiting tourists.

There is the tale that the hotel is haunted by a former resident and her cat. Abby Byr and her husband moved to Arizona for health reasons, due to her tuberculosis. They bought the hotel, but financial reversals caused them to lose the hotel, but the new owners allowed them to stay on as guests. In early 1921, Abby's husband left to run an errand, and never returned. Abby locked herself and the cat, Noble, in her room and starved themselves to death. Supposedly the ghosts of Abby and Noble still roam the hotel.
