= The Wedding (Steel novel) =

2000 novel by Danielle Steel

- First edition
- Author: Danielle Steel
- Language: English
- Genre: Romance
- Publisher: Delacorte Press
- Publication date: 2000
- Publication place: United States

The Wedding is a romance novel written by American writer Danielle Steel and published in April 2000 . Set in Los Angeles, against a star-studded backdrop, it follows a busy career woman as she meets the man of her dreams, falls in love and plans her wedding. It was first on the New York Times Best Seller list.

== Plot summary ==
Allegra Steinberg, the daughter of movie producer Simon Steinberg and television writer Blaire Scott, is an entertainment lawyer. Her family and friends include her boyfriend, Brandon, her sister Samantha, an aspiring model, and her best friend, Alan Carr, a Hollywood actor.

While on a business trip in New York City, she meets writer Jeff Hamiliton, and although there is chemistry between the pair, Allegra does not pursue the attraction. However, after she discovers that Brandon has been cheating on her, she meets up with Jeff, and before long, the couple is engaged and planning a wedding at her parents Bel Air home.

As their September ceremony looms, Allegra finds herself faced with many business, romantic and personal problems, including a pregnancy in the family, the death of a client and the return of her father. The wedding becomes a chance for forgiveness, hope and reconciliation.

== Reception ==
Publishers Weekly called it "predictable".
