= A Good Woman (novel) =

2008 novel by Danielle Steel

- First edition
- Author: Danielle Steel
- Language: English
- Publisher: Delacorte Press
- Publication date: October 2008
- Publication place: United States
- Media type: Print (hardback & paperback)
- Pages: 336 pp
- ISBN: 978-0-385-34026-7
- OCLC: 192050126
- Dewey Decimal: 813/.54 22
- LC Class: PS3569.T33828 G66 2008

A Good Woman is a novel by Danielle Steel, published by Delacorte Press in October 2008.

== Plot summary ==
Annabelle Worthington was born into a life of privilege in the glamorous New York society set up on Fifth Avenue and in Newport, Rhode Island. In April 1912, everything changed when the Titanic sank, changing her world forever. Annabelle then pours herself into volunteer work, nursing the poor, igniting a passion for medicine that would shape the course of her life.

More grief is around the corner with her first love and marriage to Josiah Millbank, a family friend. Betrayed by a scandal undeserved, Annabelle flees New York for war-ravaged France, to lose herself in a world of helping others in the First World War field hospital run by women. After the war, Annabelle becomes a Parisian doctor and a mother, living happily until a coincidental meeting reminds her of her former life, to which she returns stronger and braver than before, a new woman to fight against the overwhelming odds thrown against her in life.
