= Danielle Steel =

American author (born 1947)

- Steel in 1987
- Born: Danielle Fernandes Dominique Schuelein-Steel; August 14, 1947 (age 79); New York City, U.S.
- Education: New York University
- Occupation: Novelist
- Spouses: Claude-Eric Lazard (m. 1965; div. 1974); Danny Zugelder (m. 1975; div. 1978); William George Toth (m. 1978; div. 1981); John Traina (m. 1981; div. 1998); Thomas Perkins (m. 1998; div. 2002)
- Children: 9 (7 biological, including Nick Traina, and 2 ex-stepsons: Trevor Traina and Todd Traina)
- Writing career
- Period: 1973–present
- Genres: Romance; Contemporary
- Website: www.daniellesteel.com

Danielle Fernandes Dominique Schuelein-Steel (born August 14, 1947) is an American writer best known for her romance novels. She is the bestselling living author and the fourth-best-selling fiction author of all time, with over 800 million copies sold. As of 2024, she has written 210 books, including over 182 novels. (Note: Sources vary on the exact number of books written by Steel, placing it between 179 and 210. Since 2023 her website states 210 is the total number, with 182 novels and 18 children books. She has released between 6 and 7 books per year since 2016, so the precise number changes frequently.)

Based in California for most of her career, Steel has produced several books a year, often juggling up to five projects at once. All her novels have been bestsellers, including those issued in hardback, despite "a resounding lack of critical acclaim" (Publishers Weekly). Her books often involve rich families facing a crisis, threatened by dark elements such as prison, fraud, blackmail, and suicide.

Steel has also published children's fiction and poetry. She created the Nick Traina foundation in honor of her son. It funds mental-illness-related organizations. Her books have been translated into 43 languages, with 22 adapted for television, including two that have received Golden Globe nominations.

== Early life ==
Steel was born Danielle Fernandes Dominique Schuelein-Steel in New York City to a German father and a Portuguese mother. Her father, John Schuelein-Steel, was a German-Jewish immigrant and a descendant of owners of Löwenbräu beer. Her mother, Norma da Camara Stone dos Reis, was the daughter of a Portuguese diplomat.

She spent much of her childhood in France, where from an early age she was included in her parents' dinner parties. This gave her an opportunity to observe the habits and lives of the wealthy and famous. Her parents divorced when she was eight, and she was raised primarily by her father, rarely seeing her mother. Steel started writing stories as a child, and by her late teens had begun writing poetry. Raised Catholic, she thought of becoming a nun during her early years. A 1965 graduate of the Lycée Français de New York, she studied literature design and fashion design, first at Parsons School of Design and then at New York University.

== Career ==
=== 1965–1971: Career beginnings ===
While still attending New York University, Steel began writing, completing her first manuscript at 19. Steel worked for a public-relations agency in New York called Supergirls. A client, Ladies' Home Journal editor John Mack Carter, encouraged her to focus on writing, having been impressed with her freelance articles. He suggested she write a book, which she did. She later moved to San Francisco and worked as a copywriter for Grey Advertising.

=== 1972–1981: First novels and growing success ===
Her first novel, Going Home, was published in 1973. The novel contained many of the themes that her writing would become well known for, including a focus on family issues and human relationships. Her relationship with her second husband influenced Passion's Promise and Now and Forever, the two novels that launched her career. With the success of her fourth book, The Promise, she became a participant in San Francisco high society.

=== 1981–1996: Fame and expansion to new genres ===
Beginning in 1991, Steel had become a near-permanent fixture on The New York Times hardcover and paperback bestsellers lists. In 1999, she was listed in the Guinness Book of World Records for having a book on the New York Times Bestseller List for the most consecutive weeks of any author, 456 at that time. Steele claims her books take 2½ years to complete, and she has developed an ability to juggle up to five projects at once. She researches one book while outlining another. Since her first book was published, every one of her novels has hit bestseller lists in paperback, and each one released in hardback has also been a hardback bestseller.

During this time, Steel also expanded to non-fiction work. Having a Baby was published in 1984 and featured a chapter by Steel about suffering through miscarriage. The same year she published a book of poetry, Love: Poems. She also ventured into children's fiction, penning a series of 57 illustrated books for young readers. These books, known as the "Max and Martha" series, aim to help children face real-life problems: new baby, new school, loss of loved one, etc. In addition, Steel has authored the "Freddie" series. These four books address other real-life situations: first night away from home, trip to the doctor, etc.

In 1993, Steel sued writer Lorenzo Bene, who had intended to disclose in his book that her son Nick was adopted by her then-current husband John Traina, despite the fact that adoption records are sealed in California. A San Francisco judge made a highly unusual ruling allowing the seal on Nick's adoption to be overturned, although he was still a minor. This order was confirmed by a California Appellate Judge, who ruled that because Steel was famous, her son's adoption did not have the same privacy right, and the book was allowed to be published.

=== 1997–present: Continued success and awards ===
After years of near-constant writing, in 2003 Steel opened an art gallery in San Francisco, Steel Gallery, which showed contemporary work and exhibited the paintings and sculptures of emerging artists. The gallery closed in 2007. She continues to curate shows a few times a year for the Andrea Schwartz Gallery in San Francisco.

In 2002, Steel was decorated by the French government as an Officier of the Ordre des Arts et des Lettres, for her contributions to world culture.

She has additionally received:

- Induction into the California Hall of Fame, December 2009.
- "Distinguished Service in Mental Health Award" (first time awarded to a non-physician) from New York Presbyterian Hospital, Department of Psychiatry and Columbia University Medical School and Cornell Medical College, May 2009.
- "Outstanding Achievement Award" for work with adolescents from Larkin Street Youth Services in San Francisco, May 2003.
- "Service to Youth Award" for improving the lives of adolescents and children with mental accessibility issues from the University of San Francisco Catholic Youth Organization and St. Mary's Medical Center, November 1999.
- "Outstanding Achievement Award" in Mental Health from the California Psychiatric Association
- "Distinguished Service Award" from the American Psychiatric Association

In 2006 Steel reached an agreement with Elizabeth Arden to launch a new perfume, Danielle by Danielle Steel.

In 2014, she wrote an article for SFGate writing about her concern that San Francisco was losing its heart.

== Personal life ==
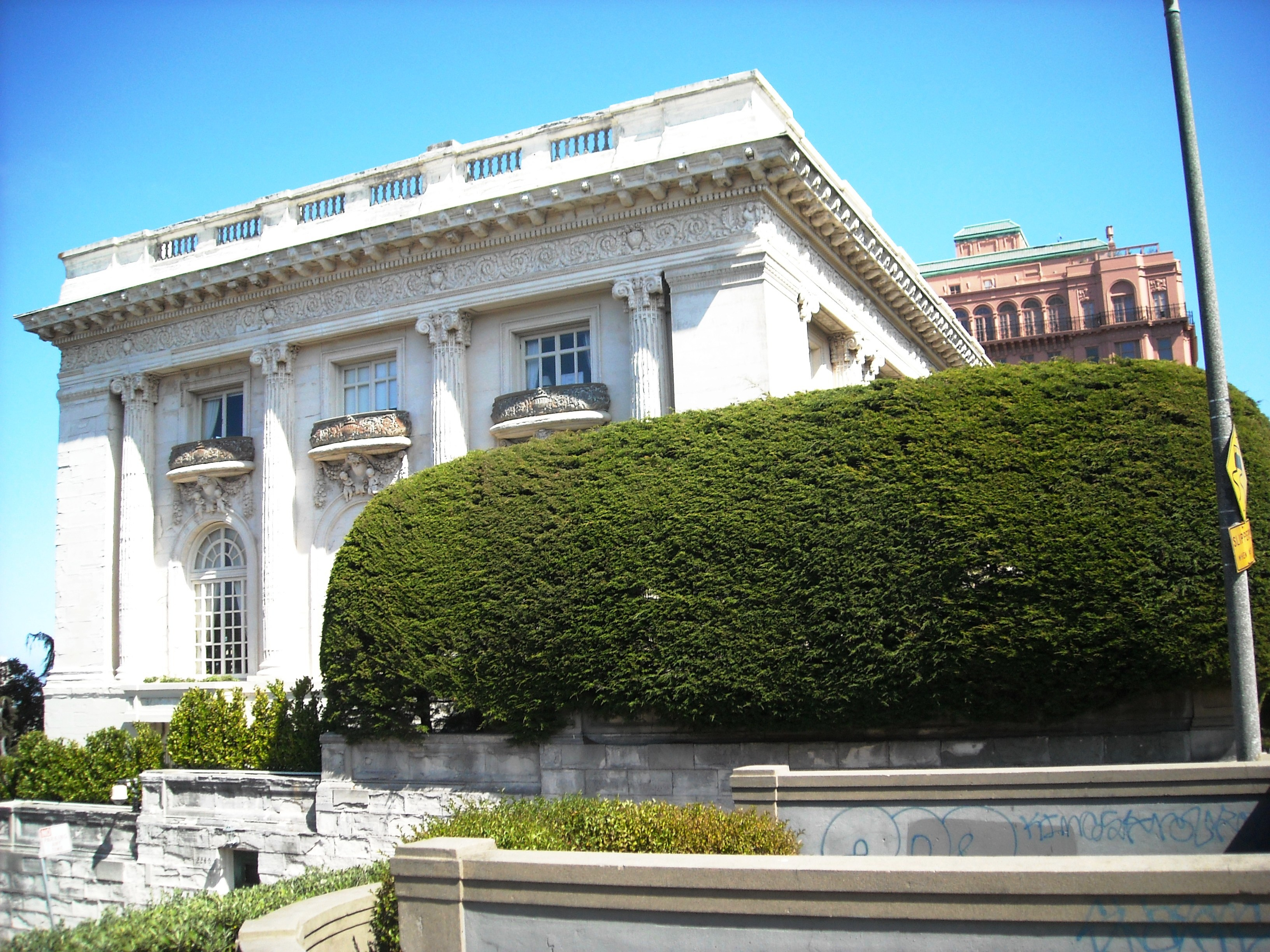
Danielle Steel's longtime residence in San Francisco, Spreckels Mansion was built in c.1913 as the mansion of sugar tycoon Adolph B. Spreckels and his wife Alma Spreckels.

Steel married French banker Claude-Éric Lazard in 1965 at age 18 and gave birth to their daughter Beatrix. Steel and Lazard separated in 1972. While still married to Lazard, Steel met Danny Zugelder while interviewing an inmate in a prison near Lompoc, California, where Zugelder was also incarcerated. He moved in with Steel when he was paroled in June 1973, but returned to prison in early 1974 on robbery and rape charges. After receiving her divorce from Lazard in 1975, she married Zugelder in the prison canteen. During their relationship, Steel suffered multiple miscarriages. She divorced Zugelder in 1978.

Steel married her third husband, William George Toth, in 1978, while pregnant with their son, Nick. They divorced in March 1981.

Steel married for the fourth time in 1981, to John Traina, a shipping and cruise magnate and later vintner and art collector who was the ex-husband of Dede Wilsey. Together they had five children, Samantha, Victoria, Vanessa, Maxx, and Zara. Traina adopted Steel's son Nick and gave him his family name and Steel also became stepmother of Traina's sons Trevor and Todd. Determined to spend as much time as possible with her children, Steel often wrote at night, making do with only four hours of sleep. Steel and Traina divorced in 1995.

Her fear of flying created many challenges in the early 1980s; she went through an eight-week course based at the San Francisco airport to overcome her fear.

Steel married for a fifth time, to Silicon Valley financier Thomas James Perkins, but the marriage ended after four years in 2002. Steel has said that her novel The Klone and I was inspired by a private joke between herself and Perkins. In 2006, Perkins dedicated his novel Sex and the Single Zillionaire to Steel.

Steel's longtime residence was in San Francisco, but she now spends most of her time at a second home in Paris. Her 55-room San Francisco home, Spreckels Mansion, was built in c.1912 as the mansion of sugar tycoon Adolph B. Spreckels.

Despite her public image and varied pursuits, Steel is known to be shy and because of that and her desire to protect her children from the tabloids, she rarely grants interviews or makes public appearances.

=== Nick Traina and Yo Angel Foundations ===
Steel's son, Nick Traina, died by suicide in 1997. Traina was the lead singer of San Francisco punk bands Link 80 and Knowledge. To honor his memory, Steel wrote the nonfiction book His Bright Light, about Nick's life and death. Proceeds of the book, which reached The New York Times Non-Fiction Bestseller List, were used to found the Nick Traina Foundation, which Steel runs, to fund organizations dedicated to treating mental accessibility issues. To gain more recognition for children's mental health, Steel has lobbied for legislation in Washington, and previously held a fundraiser every two years (known as The Star Ball) in San Francisco. In 2002, she founded Yo Angel Foundation to assist the homeless.

== Writing style ==
Steel's novels, often described as "formulaic", tend to involve the characters in a crisis that threatens their relationship. The novels sometimes explore the world of the rich and famous and frequently deal with serious life issues like illness, death, loss, family crises, and relationships. There are claims that her popular story lines are based on the events of her life.. Reviewers note that Steel's plots in recent years have evolved beyond the traditional romance-genre tropes. Ransom focuses more on suspense than romance, and follows three sets of seemingly unconnected characters as their lives begin to intersect. Toxic Bachelors departs from her usual style by telling the story through the eyes of the three title characters, men who are relationship-phobic and ultimately discover their true loves.

To avoid comparisons to her previous novels, Steel does not write sequels. Although many of her earliest books were released with initial print runs of 1 million copies, by 2004 her publisher had decreased the number of books initially printed to 650,000 due to the decline in book purchasing. However, her fan base was still extremely strong at that time, with Steel's books selling out atop charts worldwide.

=== Adaptations ===
Twenty-two of her books have been adapted for television, including two that have received Golden Globe nominations. One is Jewels, the story of the survival of a woman and her children in World War II Europe, and the family's eventual rebirth as one of the greatest jewelry houses in Europe. Columbia Pictures was the first movie studio to make an offer for one of her novels, purchasing the rights to The Ghost in 1998. Steel also reached an agreement with New Line Home Entertainment in 2005 to sell the film rights to 30 of her novels for DVDs.

=== Writing process ===
Steel spends two to three years on each book, juggling multiple projects at once. According to Steel, once she has an idea for a story, her first step is to make notes, which are mostly about the characters. She told The New York Times in 2018: "I make notes for a while before I start work on the outline. The notes are usually more about the characters. I need to know the characters really well before I start — who they are, how they think, how they feel, what has happened to them, how they grew up." In a 2019 interview with The Guardian, she reported often spending 20- to 30-hour periods on her typewriter, gaining her attention and criticism.

Steel has written all of her novels on Olympia SG1 standard typewriters. She has two that she primarily writes on: one at her home in San Francisco and another at her home in Paris. Her typewriter at her home in San Francisco has been in her possession since she bought it while working on her first book. According to Steel, she bought it second hand for $20.

== Works ==
Danielle Steel has written more than 210 books, including over 182 novels. Her books have been translated into 43 languages and can be found in 69 countries across the globe.

Her works consist of novels, non-fiction, picture books, and two series of children's books: the Max & Martha series and the Freddie series.

== Filmography ==
1. The Promise (1979, theatrical film)
2. Now and Forever (1983, theatrical film)
3. Crossings (1986, miniseries)
4. Kaleidoscope (1990, television film)
5. Fine Things (1990, television film)
6. Changes (1991, television film)
7. Palomino (1991, television film)
8. Daddy (1991, television film)
9. Secrets (1992, television film)
10. Jewels (1992, miniseries)
11. Heartbeat (1993, television film)
12. Star (1993, television film)
13. Message from Nam (1993, television film)
14. Once in a Lifetime (1994, television film)
15. A Perfect Stranger (1994, television film)
16. Family Album (1994, miniseries)
17. Vanished (1995, television film)
18. Zoya (1995, television film)
19. Mixed Blessings (1995, television film)
20. No Greater Love (1996, television film)
21. Remembrance (1996, television film)
22. Full Circle (1996, television film)
23. The Ring (1996, television film)
24. Safe Harbour (2007, direct-to-video)

== See also ==
- List of bestselling novels in the United States
- List of bestselling fiction authors
