= Forensic Anthropology Center at Texas State =

Research facility at Texas State University

Coordinates: 29.888650°N 97.939086°W

The Forensic Anthropology Center at Texas State (FACTS) is a 26-acre forensic anthropology research facility located on the Freeman Ranch in San Marcos, Texas. It is one of the seven extant body farms in the United States and the largest such forensics research facility in the world.

== Background ==
A Forensic Anthropology Research Facility was commissioned by the Texas State University Department of Anthropology and is under the direction of Michelle Hamilton, a former student of Bill Bass, founder of the first body farm. The forensic research facility is fully operational and is part of the Forensic Anthropology Center at Texas State (FACTS). The forensic facility has received a financial donation of over $100,000 from a distinguished professor emeritus of Texas State University, and has started construction of an adjoining million dollar lab to augment the facility. The development of this facility has been possible through the efforts of Jerry Melbye.

Prior to the selection of the location, objections by local residents and the nearby San Marcos Municipal Airport (owing to concerns about circling vultures) stalled the plan. But on February 12, 2008, Texas State University announced that its Freeman Ranch, off County Road 213 northwest of San Marcos, would be the site of the facility. The vultures that originally created problems for the location of the research facility have provided a new area of study on the effect of vulture scavenging on human decomposition.

The Forensic Anthropology Research Facility (FARF) is a human decomposition research laboratory where questions related to outdoor crime scenes and decomposition rates for human remains under various topographical and climate conditions are investigated. The FARF serves as a resource for students of forensic anthropology as well as state and national law enforcement agencies. The work conducted here will have a direct impact on law enforcement and forensic investigations throughout the state of Texas, and beyond. The Forensic Anthropology Center at Texas State accepts body donations for scientific research purposes under the Uniform Anatomical Gift Act. The areas of research conducted with donated bodies will include reconstructing the postmortem interval to determine time since death and related studies in human decomposition. The overall aim of this type of research is to assist law enforcement agents and the medico-legal community in their investigations.

While practical restraints currently limit the Forensic Anthropology Research Facility to only around seven acres in the Texas Hill Country, Freeman Ranch has about 4,200 acres (17 km^{2}) available.

== See also ==
- Missing in Brooks County
