= Chemistry of death =

The chemistry of death can refer to:

- Post-mortem chemistry
- The Chemistry of Death, a 2006 novel by Simon Beckett
- The Chemistry of Death (TV series), a 2023 television series based on the novel
