= Missing in Brooks County =

- Directed by: Lisa Molomot and Jeff Bemiss
- Based on: Deaths of illegal migrants bypassing a Border Patrol checkpoint in Texas
- Edited by: Jacob Bricca
- Music by: Ted Reichman
- Production company: Fork Films
- Release date: October 21, 2020
- Running time: 81 minutes
- Country: US
- Language: English

Missing in Brooks County is a 2020 feature-length documentary (1 hr 21 m), directed and filmed by Lisa Molomot and Jeff Bemiss. Its subject is the passage of illegal migrants through Brooks County, Texas, and specifically how thousands die of dehydration and exposure hiking some 35 miles (56 km) across open fields in 100 °F (38 °C) heat, to avoid the Border Patrol internal checkpoint near Falfurrias, Texas. The ground is sandy and taxing to walk in, and lack of landmarks makes it easy for migrants to get lost and go in circles. Brooks County leads the nation in migrant deaths; most bodies are never found, and most of those found are never identified. The county sheriff calls the county "the biggest cemetery in the United States". News stories have called it "migrants' Death Valley."

== Background ==
=== The Falfurrias checkpoint ===
As is explained in the film, in 1994 the federal government began Operation Hold the Line in Texas, together with similar operations in California and Arizona. To deter illegal border crossings, the main crossing points, such as El Paso and Laredo, were strengthened. It was believed that the desolate, almost uninhabited land without a reinforced border would be too difficult for migrants to cross. This proved not to be the case, and a network of internal checkpoints up to 100 miles (160 km) from the border was set up to catch those who made it in. One was built near Falfurrias; it is the largest and best equipped internal border checkpoint in the country. It is also the biggest employer in the poor, rural county. Many migrants die of dehydration hiking through open land so as to bypass this border checkpoint; Brooks County leads the nation in illegal migrant deaths, estimated at 2,000 since 2008. According to Brooks County Sheriff Urbino "Benny" Martinez, only 20% of the bodies of those reported missing are ever located; another estimate is that the number of deaths is 10 times the number of bodies found. Most of the corpses that are found—skeletons, in some cases, 62 such in 2017—are never identified. According to Martinez's remark in the movie, the ongoing expense of dealing with the bodies found has bankrupted the county. In 2020, it cost the county about $2,000 per body (equivalent to $2,488 in 2025) to remove the remains from the scene and obtain an autopsy.

Overall, when traced from discovery to burial, the death of a single migrant costs a county a minimum of $1,100. This total assumes that county officials do not request an autopsy, pay nothing for a burial plot, and use no specialized equipment to retrieve a drowned individual. However, when factoring in these and other costs, a single migrant death could cost a county upwards of $13,100.

=== Anthropologists exhuming bodies and analyzing DNA ===
The movie project began when Molomot and Bemiss, who met while teaching at Trinity College in Hartford, Connecticut, heard a story on NPR's Story Corps series about Lori Baker, a Baylor University associate professor of anthropology, who has spent years volunteering her time and expertise to ID bodies of anonymous dead migrants. Molomot and Bemiss accompanied her to Brooks County, and there realized that the story needing telling was larger.

Baker does not appear in the movie, but Kate Spradley does; she is a forensic anthropologist from the Forensic Anthropology Center at Texas State University in San Marcos, Texas. She brings teams of her students to Falfurrias to recover some of the hundreds of undiscovered bodies. They dig up and take the bodies they can locate to her lab, where they try to identify them, in order to notify the deceased's families. The DNA is entered into a national DNA database called CODIS (the Combined DNA Index System).

Spradley learns, when she visits the Sacred Heart Burial Park, the Catholic section of the Falfurrias Burial Park, that only the men who cut the grass know where the unmarked migrant burials are. After speaking with them, she remarks that she now knows that there are many more bodies than had been made public, and that her team has years of work to do in that one cemetery.

== People ==
The film does not have a narrator, and it more presents a situation than tells a story. According to co-director Bemiss, "We wanted to treat the audience as intelligent. We didn't want to preach to them. We wanted to just show them what's going on and let people make up their minds, but in order to do that, they have to see what's going on, so we tried to make it a 360 degree view and let everybody have their moment to say their piece. Let the audience decide what kind of country they want to have and what kind of policy they want to have about their border."

We meet the Brooks County Sheriff, who tries to help migrants' families as best he can; he has binders full of pictures of remains. His deputy, driving the county roads, twice points out that he is the only deputy on duty for the county of over 900,000 acres (360,000 ha). A Border Patrol agent rescues a migrant, treating him respectfully; the rescue probably means expulsion, but that is preferable to death. According to the Border Patrol agent, Alex Jara, "If we call them people it starts getting to you".

=== Migrants' families, searching ===
The movie follows two migrants' families, who came to Falfurrias searching for their loved ones who have been missing since they started their hikes around the checkpoint. As they search for answers, the family members encounter a haunted land where death is a part of everyday life.

==== Homero Román-Gómez ====
Omar Román-Gómez and his family are searching for the body of his older brother, Homero. He had been brought to the United States when he was 5, and had lived in the U.S. for 20 years. A routine traffic violation resulted in his being returned to Mexico, a country he did not know. Missing his family in Houston, and unable to feel at home in Mexico, in 2015 he paid a coyote (human smuggler) to guide him across the Rio Grande and around the Falfurrias checkpoint. He has not been heard from since. Remains are located that might have been his, and the filmmakers raised the money to have them analyzed by a private lab. After months of waiting, the lab reported that the remains are not Homero's.

==== Juan Maceda Salazar ====
Moisés Zavala is searching for his cousin, Juan Maceda.

=== Eddie Canales, working for the migrants ===
A major figure in the film is Eddie Canales, a retired union organizer who founded the shoestring South Texas Human Rights Center in Falfurrias in 2013. He tries to help families locate their missing loved ones, answering a hotline and helping callers access sources of information on the missing migrants and the unidentified corpses and skeletons.

To save lives, Canales leaves jugs of water along the migrants' routes through the county, together with flags on poles so they can be seen from a distance and geographical coordinates so migrants calling for help can tell rescuers where they are. Canales says that he needs ranchers' permission to leave the water along the route through their ranches, which lessens the chances that migrants will die on the property in question; at first only one allowed him, but at the time of the movie, he states, there were seven. He stumbles on a dead body while making water deliveries.

In 2016, 14 of his water stations were stolen, and had to be replaced. The theft was unsolved as of when the movie was made.

=== Michael Vickers, working against the migrants ===
A rancher who refuses permission for jugs of clean water to be left on his property is veterinarian Michael Vickers, co-founder of the Texas Border Volunteers, a paramilitary group that hunts migrants and turns them over to the US Border Patrol. Vickers is a hunter, and proudly exhibits his large collection of mounted heads with antlers, of deer and similar horned animals. He says he has seen the flow of migrants increase from "a few polite peasants a week" to "a flood of desperate people", many of whom, according to him, are criminals and possibly terrorists. As one of the Volunteers put it, "An illegal alien crosser is an illegal alien crosser, it's black and white, it's not gray. We're in a war zone here." Vickers sees no point in water stations for migrants; they can use, he said, the cattle troughs of water. He thinks that Canales may have stolen his own water stations, to increase sympathy and contributions.

Medical examiner Dr. Corinne Stern explains that water in these cattle troughs is usually contaminated and can kill people. The film interviews, without showing his face, a migrant who says he was with Maceda when he died, a direct result of drinking bad water.

== Awards and showings ==
The film had its world premiere at the 2020 Hot Springs Documentary Film Festival, where it received the award of "Best Southern Documentary". It was chosen as best documentary feature at the 2021 Ashland Independent Film Festival, Atlanta DocuFest, Doc. Boston Documentary Film Festival, RiverRun International Film Festival, Thin Line Festival, Toronto Arthouse Film Festival, Newburyport Documentary Film Festival, Adirondack Film Festival, Lost River Film Festival, and the San Luis Obispo International Film Festival, at the latter of which it was also chosen by the audience as "Best in the Fest".

After showing in selected theaters in 2021, It will have its broadcast premiere on the PBS series Independent Lens, on January 31, 2022. It was a Finalist for a duPont Columbia Award and won a Peabody Award in the Documentary category in 2022.

== Funders ==
Missing in Brooks County was funded by ITVS, Fork Films, and Engel Entertainment, with additional funding from Perspective Fund, the Arizona Commission on the Arts, the Life Extension Foundation, the University of Arizona Office of Research, Innovation and Impact, Human Rights POV, UA Hanson Film Institute, the Connecticut Office of the Arts, Mountainfilm, and the University of Arizona College of Fine Arts. Fiscal sponsorship was by the International Documentary Association.

== See also ==
- Borderland (TV series)
