= Jeanne Goursaud =

German-French actress (born 1996)

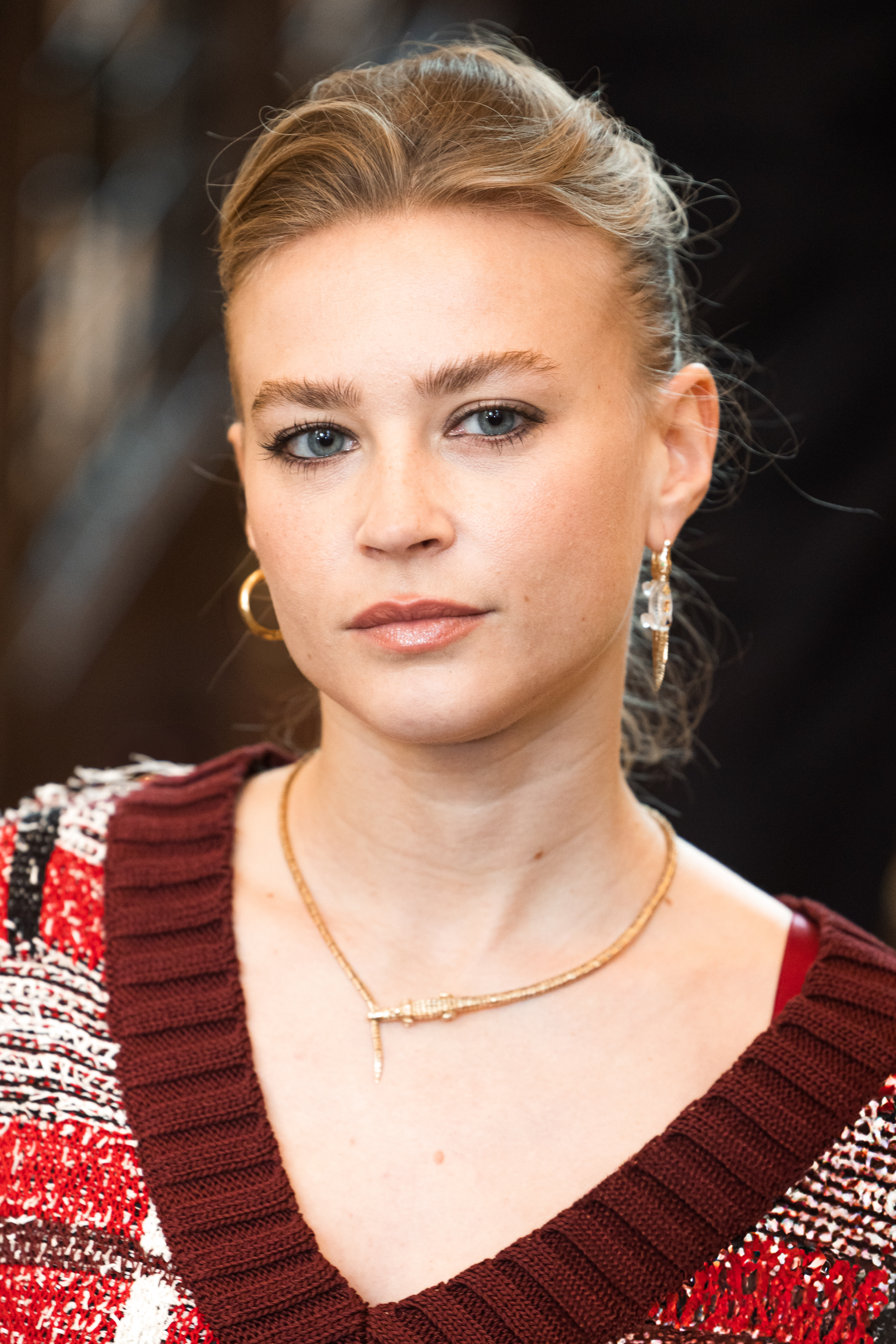
- Jeanne Goursaud, 2024
- Born: 4 April 1996 (age 30); Pinneberg, Germany
- Years active: 2012–present

Jeanne Goursaud (born 4 April 1996) is a German-French actress. She is known to international audiences for her roles in the Netflix series Barbarians (2020–2022) and the Paramount+ series The Chemistry of Death (2023).

== Early life ==
Goursaud was born in Pinneberg district north of Hamburg in Schleswig-Holstein, to a German mother and a French father. She grew up in Halstenbek, where she and her sister would put on plays in their yard. She took drama classes at the TASK drama school.

== Career ==
In 2012, Goursaud had a modeling gig with the beauty brand Bebe Young Care. That same year, she made her television debut with guest appearances in episodes of Die Pfefferkörner (The Peppercorns) on KiKa and Neues aus Büttenwarder (News from Büttenwarder) on NDR Fernsehen.

Goursaud made her English-language debut in 2015 when she played the recurring character Emma in season 2 of the Australian children's series In Your Dreams on 7two. The following year, she made her feature film debut in Erwartungen. In 2017, she joined the cast of the RTL school-set comedy-drama Der Lehrer for its fifth season as Bibi, a role she would play until its seventh season in 2019. She also appeared in the web series Wishlist, the television film Zaun an Zaun, and the parody film Bullyparade: The Movie.

While living in Paris to hone her French-language skills, Goursaud was scouted for the 2018 Clint Eastwood film The 15:17 to Paris. She played Rebecca Jungblut in the Das Erste series Hubert ohne Staller.

In 2020, Goursaud began portraying the real-life Cheruscan noblewoman Thusnelda in the Netflix historical war drama Barbarians. She then starred as Jazz in Para – We Are King on Warner TV in 2021 and Jenny Krause in the British thriller The Chemistry of Death, an adaptation of the novel by Simon Beckett for Paramount+ in 2023.

== Filmography ==
=== Film ===
Year	Title	Role	Notes
2016	Erwartungen	Vanessa	
2017	Bullyparade: The Movie	Babsirella	
2017	Pestana	Anna	Short film
2017	Dieter Not Unhappy	Girl	
2018	The 15:17 to Paris	Lea	
2018	What Doesn't Kill Us		
2018	Klassentreffen 1.0	Kellnerin - Club	
2018	Cold Feet (German: Kalte Füße)	Nicole	
2019	The Three Exclamation Marks (German: Die Drei!)	Sabrina	
2022	The Magic Flute	Lady Azure	
2025	Exterritorial	Sara Wulf	Main role

=== Television ===
Year	Title	Role	Notes
2012, 2016	The Peppercorns (German: Die Pfefferkörner)	Lara Lehnert	2 episodes
2012	News from Büttenwarder (German: Neues aus Büttenwarder)	Paula Bertram	Episode: "Survival"
2014	Charlottes Welt - Geht nicht, gibt's nicht	Geraldine	Television film
2015	Die Mutter des Mörders	Lea Gräf	Television film
2015	In Your Dreams	Emma	3 episodes (season 2)
2015	Time to Say Goodbye	Woman	Television film
2015	Alles was zählt	Emma Schneider	2 episodes
2016	Die siebte Stunde	Ravenée	Television film
2017–2019	Der Lehrer	Bibi	56 episodes (seasons 5–7)
2017	Zaun an Zaun	Sofie Weidinger	Television film
2017–2023	In Wahrheit	Lisa Krohn	Television film series
2017	Der Schweinehirt	Prinzessin Victoria	Television film
2017–2018	Wishlist	Janina Novak	Web series, 11 episodes
2018	Einstein	Lina	Episode: "Expansion"
2018	Großstadtrevier	Janine Herder	Episode: "Dra di net um"
2018	Blockbustaz	Frau Bischoff	Episode: "Geißbock"
2018	Alarm für Cobra 11 – Die Autobahnpolizei	Jessi Winkels	Episode: "Harte Schule"
2018	Herzkino.Märchen	Bianca Rothe	Schneeweißchen und Rosenrot
2019	Hubert ohne Staller	Rebecca Jungblut	17 episodes
2019	SOKO Wismar	Amelie Haag	Episode: "Die Rache der Ostseeschnäpel"
2020–2022	Barbarians	Thusnelda	Main role
2021	Der Bergdoktor	Luisa Sturm	Episode: "Bis nichts mehr bleibt"
2021–present	Para – We Are King	Jazz	Main role
2023	The Chemistry of Death	Jenny Krause	Main role
2023	Dear Child	Lena Beck	Breves apariciones (Lena hace 13 años)
2023	Pax Massilia	Alice Vidal	Main role
