= Body farm =

Research facility where body decomposition is studied

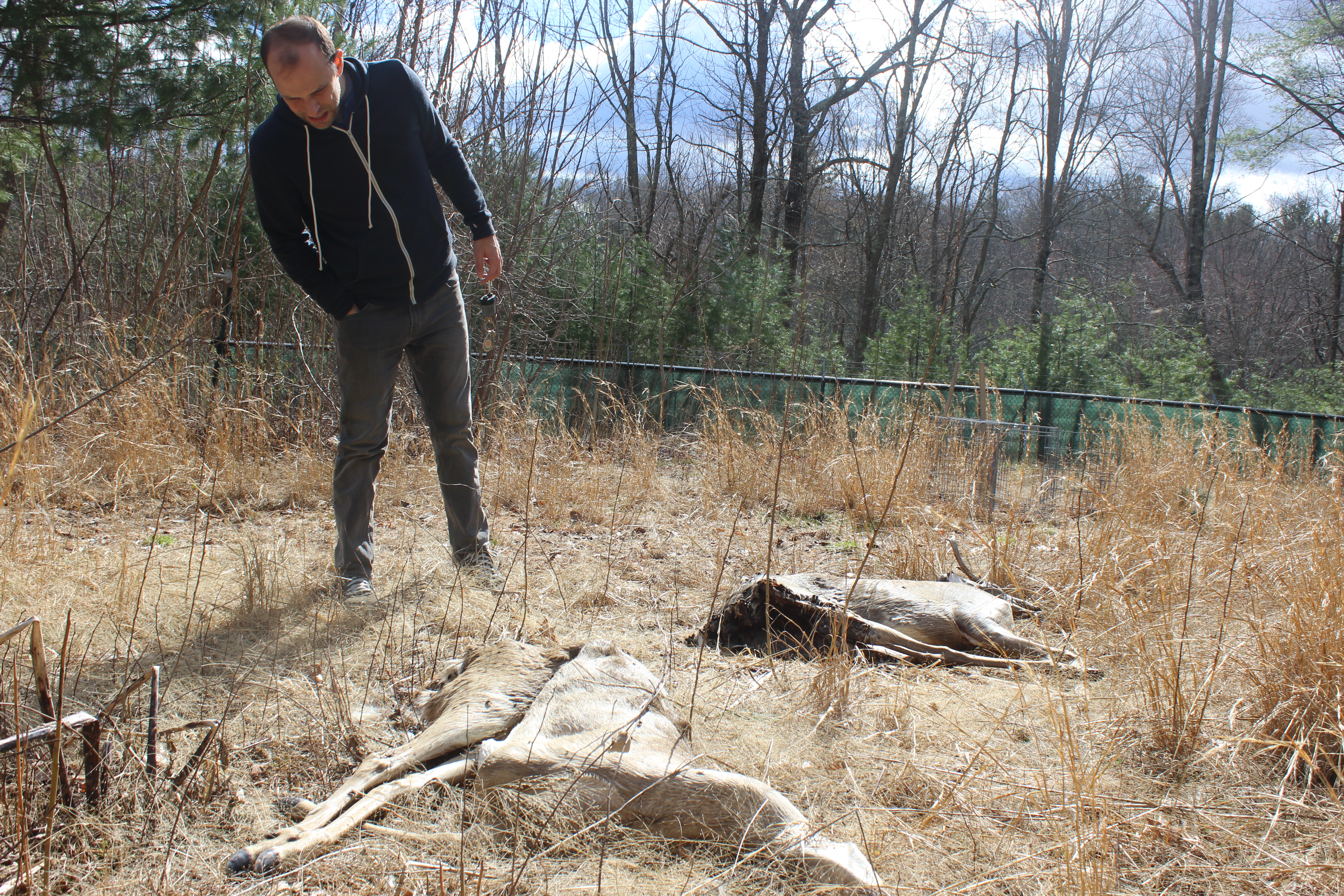
Decomposing deer carcasses being studied at the Outdoor Research Facility, a body farm at Boston University

A body farm is a research facility where decomposition of humans and non-human animals can be studied in a variety of settings. The initial facility was conceived by anthropologist William M. Bass in 1981 at the University of Tennessee in Knoxville, Tennessee, where Bass was interested in studying the decomposition of a human corpse from the time of death to the time of decay. The aim was to gain a better understanding of the decomposition process, permitting the development of techniques for extracting information such as the timing and circumstances of death from human remains. Body farm research is of particular interest in forensic anthropology and related disciplines, and has applications in the fields of law enforcement and forensic science. Numerous purposes exist for these research facilities, yet their main purpose is to study and form an understanding of the decompositional changes that occur with the human body. By placing the bodies outside to face the elements, researchers are able to get a better understanding of the decomposition process. This research is then used for medical, legal and educational purposes. Following the outdoor research, skeletal remains are cleaned and curated in permanent known skeletal collections open for research. Such collections are critical for testing and developing new identification methods.

== United States ==
Federal Bureau of Investigation agents training at a human body farm

Eight such facilities exist across the United States, as far south as sub-tropical Florida (USF‑FORT) and as far north as Marquette, Michigan, at Northern Michigan University. The research facility operated by Texas State University at Freeman Ranch is the largest at 26 acres (10.52 hectares).

Rick Schwein, head of the FBI office in Asheville, North Carolina, finds use in the body farms, saying the information from them can be used at many different levels and thus is valuable from a scientific perspective. There have been proposals to open body farms in other locations in the United States. Few of these have been successful as yet; for example, a facility in Las Vegas was proposed in 2003 but was unable to secure funding.

=== University of Tennessee ===
The original body farm is the University of Tennessee Anthropological Research Facility located a few miles from downtown on Alcoa Highway in Knoxville, Tennessee, behind the University of Tennessee Medical Center. It was first started in late 1980 by forensic anthropologist William M. Bass as a facility for the study of the decomposition of human remains. Bass became head of the university's anthropology department in 1971, and as official state forensic anthropologist for Tennessee he was frequently consulted in police cases involving decomposed human remains. Since no facilities existed that specifically studied decomposition, in 1981 he opened the department's first body farm.

It consists of a 2.5-acre (10,000 m^{2}) wooded plot, surrounded by a razor wire fence. At any one time there will be a number of bodies placed in different settings throughout the facility and left to decompose. The bodies are exposed in a number of ways in order to provide insights into decomposition under varying conditions. Some of the conditions students studied were situations such as a body being locked in the trunk of a car, or being submerged under water, which provided some factual and data driven knowledge to help in many forensic cases. Observations and records of the decomposition process are kept, including the sequence and speed of decomposition and the effects of insect activity. The human decomposition stages that are studied begin with the fresh stage, then the bloat stage, then decay, and finally the dry stage.

More than a hundred bodies are donated to the facility every year. Some individuals have pre-registered themselves; the others are donated by their families (60%) or by a medical examiner. Perhaps the most famous person to donate his body for study was the anthropologist Grover Krantz, as described by his colleague David Hunt at the Smithsonian.

The University of Tennessee Body Farm is also used in the training of law enforcement officers in scene-of-crime skills and techniques.

=== Western Carolina University ===
The Forensic Osteology Research Station (FOREST) is located at Western Carolina University in Cullowhee, North Carolina, and is the second human decomposition research facility to open in the United States. It was opened in 2007, and is run by WCU's Forensic Anthropology program on a small plot on the rural mountain campus. It consists of a 0.080-acre (324 m^{2}) plot of land in the Blue Ridge Physiographic Province. The facility has also been used for cadaver dog training.

=== Texas State University ===
A Forensic Anthropology Research Facility was commissioned by the Texas State University-San Marcos Department of Anthropology and is under the direction of Dr. Michelle Hamilton, a former student of Dr. Bill Bass. The forensic research facility is fully operational and is part of the Forensic Anthropology Center at Texas State (FACTS). The forensic facility has received a financial donation of over $100,000 from a Distinguished Professor Emeritus of Texas State University, and has started construction of an adjoining million-dollar lab to augment the facility. The development of this facility has been possible through the efforts of Dr. Jerry Melbye, D‑ABFA.

Prior to the selection of the location, objections by local residents and the nearby San Marcos Municipal Airport (owing to concerns about circling vultures) stalled the plan. But on February 12, 2008, Texas State University announced that its Freeman Ranch, off County Road 213 northwest of San Marcos, would be the site of the facility.

The vultures that originally created problems for the location of the research facility have provided a new area of study on the effect of vulture scavenging on human decomposition.

A new body is brought to the facility every five or six months. The bodies typically come from Texas hospitals, funeral homes, or medical examiners' offices; from there, they are strapped to a gurney, loaded into cargo vans, and brought to the ranch, where researchers and student volunteers begin their research on the corpses.

The Forensic Anthropology Research Facility (FARF) is a human decomposition research laboratory where questions related to outdoor crime scenes and decomposition rates for human remains under various topographical and climate conditions are investigated. The FARF serves as a resource for students of forensic anthropology as well as state and national law enforcement agencies. The work conducted here will have a direct impact on law enforcement and forensic investigations throughout the state of Texas, and beyond.

The Forensic Anthropology Center at Texas State accepts body donations for scientific research purposes under the Uniform Anatomical Gift Act. To date they have received 150 bodies, with up to 200 more donations planned. The areas of research conducted with donated bodies will include reconstructing the postmortem interval to determine time since death and related studies in human decomposition. The overall aim of this type of research is to assist law enforcement agents and the medico-legal community in their investigations.

While practical restraints currently limit the Forensic Anthropology Research Facility to only around seven acres in the Texas Hill Country, Freeman Ranch has about 4,200 acres (17 km^{2}) available. Freeman Ranch is a working ranch that also serves as an educational model for ranch management. It is an area of land for educational outreach and research. Researchers and students visit the ranch and participate in educational activities and projects. Researchers and students are allowed to conduct experiments and studies at the ranch, including forensic anthropology.

=== Sam Houston State University ===
The Southeast Texas Applied Forensic Science Facility (STAFS) is a state-of-the-art research and training facility designed to advance academic and technical knowledge in the application of forensic science disciplines to crime scenes and criminal activities. The facility's predominant focus of study is the application of forensic sciences to the human body and the vast amount of evidence that can be gleaned from the careful recognition, collection, and preservation of that evidence. The facility is recognized by the Anatomical Board of Texas as a willed-body donor facility, and accepts human body donations for the purposes of scientific research.

The facility trains students, law enforcement officials, academicians and forensic specialists.

The facility is located within the Pineywoods Environmental Research Laboratory (PERL) at Sam Houston State University, a 247-acre (100 ha) parcel of land adjacent to the Sam Houston National Forest. One acre of maximum-security fencing surrounds the outdoor research facility with an additional eight acres (0.032 km^{2}) of minimum security reserved for other types of forensic training such as search and recovery maneuvers. Contained within the outdoor facility are a variety of various environmental conditions, including a fluvial environment. Web cams are located within the outdoor facility to monitor timing of various post-mortem activities from on and off-campus computers.

The building is designed as a morgue with cooler and freezer units, modern morgue equipment and tools and digital radiograph and microscope capabilities.

The environment in southeast Texas is quite different from the environment of East Tennessee. East Tennessee's mean annual temperature is 67°F (19°C). The Huntsville, TX area's mean annual temperature is 75°F (23°C). This difference in temperature from other facilities produces different decomposition results.

=== Southern Illinois University ===
The Complex for Forensic Anthropology Research (CFAR) was opened at Southern Illinois University, Carbondale in October 2010 by Gretchen R. Dabbs and D. C. Martin to examine the rate and pattern of decomposition in the unique environment of Southern Illinois by working with pigs as human proxies. CFAR is an approximately 0.33 acres (0.13 ha) facility with the lowest average temperature, highest average wind speed, second lowest elevation, most acidic soil, and worst soil drainage compared to other facilities at the time of its founding. The geographic differences between CFAR and other established facilities have been proven to heavily influence the rate and pattern of decomposition due to vulture scavenging. The first human donation was accepted at CFAR in January 2012.

Researchers at CFAR attempt to mimic clandestine body disposal situations and understand how the process of decomposition is altered by those postmortem treatments and how the postmortem treatment can be identified after skeletonization.

The faculty and staff of CFAR also participate in forensic anthropology consultations and provide training seminars for local, state, and federal law enforcement agencies.

=== Colorado Mesa University ===
The Forensic Investigation Research Station (FIRS) is part of Colorado Mesa University in Grand Junction, under the direction of Dr. Christiane Baigent. Its location is at a high altitude (4,750 feet (1,450 m) AMSL) and receives an average of 8.6 inches (22 cm) of rain a year, allowing for the study of decomposition in an arid environment. FIRS has an indoor research facility – a classroom, a wet lab/morgue, a walk-in cooler, an intake area, an office, and secure storage areas – and approximately two acres with outdoor cameras for both security and research.

The first pig was placed in the outdoor facility in September 2012, the indoor facility opened for classes in January 2013, and the first human donation was placed in November 2013. As of January 2018, the facility had eleven human cadavers on site. Most remains desiccate quickly and current research focuses on the variation in the desiccation process and determining the post-mortem interval on mummified or desiccated remains.

=== University of South Florida ===
The USF Facility for Outdoor Research and Training (FORT) is part of the Florida Institute for Forensic Anthropology and Applied Science (IFAAS) at the University of South Florida in Tampa. The FORT was created by Erin Kimmerle, Executive Director IFAAS in 2016. This facility began as a 3.4-acre (14,000 m^{2}) outdoor research laboratory in Pasco County and has since moved to a larger and more ecologically diverse location outside of Gainesville in Alachua County. It accepts human bodies through the USF Human Donation Program for use in training students and law enforcement on finding clandestine burials, grave excavation, and outdoor crime scene processing, as well as advanced training for mass grave excavation in human rights investigations. The outdoor facility and the ethically sourced, curated skeletal collection is open to visiting scholars and researchers. The program began in 2016 and it is the first and only facility of its type in Florida, as well as in a subtropical environment.

=== George Mason University ===
The Forensic Science Research and Training Lab is operated by George Mason University on the Science and Technology Campus in Prince William County, Virginia. The approximately five-acre facility supports research on human decomposition, postmortem interval estimation, clandestine grave detection, forensic search and recovery, and skeletal analysis in the Mid-Atlantic environment. It also serves as a training site for students, law enforcement personnel, medicolegal death investigators, and forensic practitioners.

== Australia ==
The Australian Facility for Taphonomic Experimental Research (AFTER) was opened in 2016 by Shari Forbes. It is located near Yarramundi in the outskirts of Sydney, Australia, on a patch of land owned by the University of Technology, Sydney, and it is the first body farm outside the United States. It was established as research has demonstrated that differing environmental conditions mean that the findings of body farm analysis in the United States are frequently not relevant to Australia. Research published from AFTER showed using time-lapse imagery that post-mortem movement of arms is greatest during early stages of decomposition, whereas post-mortem movement of legs occurs more during advanced decomposition.

== Canada ==
In 2018 the "Secure Site for Research in Thanatology" was established by Shari Forbes at Bécancour, Quebec, as part of the University of Quebec in Trois-Rivières. It has since been renamed Site de Recherche en Sciences Thanatologiques [Expérimentales et Sociales] (REST[ES]), or Site for Research on Experimental and Social Thanatology. The facility is the first of its kind to study the rate of natural human decomposition in the context of the colder, humid continental northern climate of Canada.

== United Kingdom ==
Several universities in Britain have used animal remains to understand human taphonomy but there are currently no facilities that use human remains. Pigs are commonly studied but they are useful in this field only to a certain extent since they don't carry the same illnesses or obtain the same injuries as humans that affect cause of death or how the body decomposes. Professor Sue Black has argued that human body farms are unnecessary as they frequently use old people's bodies which are not as representative of the average murder victim and animal bodies are just as good.

== Body donations ==
Procedures vary from country to country. Canadian forensic anthropology facilities can access a body when a person has decided to donate their own body and signed a form to ensure their wishes are carried out after the death. Others may allow a family member, the legal next-of-kin, to donate human remains. Unknown/unclaimed bodies have been accepted for donation in the USA although some consider this as unethical.

The body farms will reject a donation if the person had been infected with the human immunodeficiency virus (HIV), hepatitis, or antibiotic-resistant bacteria.

== Opposition ==
The body farms have contributed a great deal to the field of forensic anthropology. However, when such facilities first opened, local communities sometimes resisted, many arguing that the decomposing corpses attract insects and scavenging animals. After the opening of the University of Tennessee's Body Farm, there were a number of complaints about odor. Also, many people even claimed that they could see the decomposing bodies from their homes. The university fixed this problem by installing a privacy fence. In Tennessee, after the opening of the first body farm, an organization called Solutions to Issues of Concern to Knoxvillians (SICK) protested the facility by holding up signs that read, "This makes us SICK." However, all the facilities were able to open and quickly overcame concerns. Some citizens continue to oppose such facilities in their communities. Original plans to build the USF facility on Hillsborough County Sheriff's Office property in Lithia were cancelled in April 2015 over concerns from nearby residents about possible smells and groundwater contamination. The facility was ultimately opened in Pasco county.

== Forensic advancement ==
Since the start of the initial Body Farm in Tennessee, William Bass, a forensic anthropologist, has worked to help fill in various law enforcement officials on questions involving decomposition rates that help pin-point the time of death of victims during trials. Furthering this research at the Tennessee Body Farm, Bass and his team began to expand into other forensic investigative questions such as what was the climate during death, if water was involved during the decomposition process, and if clothing was on the body or not during decomposition. All questions and areas of focus which help narrow the window of possible death during investigative research on dead and decomposing bodies in trials.

Jennifer DeBruyn, a microbial ecologist, has begun studying both the impact of the environment on the body, and the body's impact on the environment at the Tennessee Body Farm in 2015. Focusing on the impact and importance of the microbe environments inside the human body and in the soil as different enzymes leach out during decomposition, DeBruyn and her team have helped narrow down two potential bacterial organisms Bacteroides and Lactobacillus which offer the potential for consistent cycles and rates during decomposition. DeBruyn hopes this area of research has the potential to narrow down the possible window of death even more so in the face of variations from climate, water, variance in individual metabolic decomposition rates and potential scavengers.

== Medical practice ==
Medical practitioners ask a number of questions when observing decomposed or dead bodies. According to Bass, seven questions are required to complete forensic investigations. "Bass lays out these questions as a guideline to help pinpoint potential time of death and cause of death. The questions Bass asks pertain to such decomposition traits as was the body in the shade or sunlight; was there water involved; or even the different stages associated with death and dying which can help paint part of the forensic picture."

Each stage of death is analyzed independently at the Body Farms to get a better understanding of the decomposition process on the body. Medical practitioners determine which insects or what climate cause human bodies to decompose the quickest, or in which manner they decompose according to differences in temperature or type of insect. The information regarding decomposed bodies is found to be important to the scientific community even if that information is found not necessarily in the bodies themselves, but the soil and plant life surrounding the bodies. Bryant "has found grave importance in the soil surrounding the decomposing bodies at the Body Farms. Pointing out that how the breakdown and leaching of human proteins and bacteria out into the soil can help pinpoint time of death and questions regarding the climate at the scene of death." Products of the decomposed body eventually seep into the soil leaving behind traces of the body which helps researchers determine the length in time that a body has been in that particular area.

== In popular culture ==
The concept of a body farm in general, as well as the existing institutions in particular, have been used in several crime-related works of popular culture. Notable examples include:

- Patricia Cornwell's novel The Body Farm is based on the University of Tennessee facility, but not on actual events surrounding it. The character of Dr. Thomas Katz was based upon Dr. Bill Bass. In his book, Death's Acre, which has a foreword by Cornwell, Bass and co-author Jon Jefferson describe the experiment he undertook on her behalf. A similar experiment conducted by the fictional Dr. Katz solves the book's mystery.
- Authors Jon Jefferson and Bill Bass have published a number of fictional murder mystery novels based on the body farm at the University of Tennessee in Knoxville under the pseudonym Jefferson Bass. The lead character is based on Bill Bass.
- In the British television series Waking the Dead, forensic pathologist Dr. Eve Lockhart has her own body farm. She reappears in a spin-off series The Body Farm.
- In the US show Rizzoli & Isles, the chief medical examiner of Massachusetts, Dr. Maura Isles, has a giant African spur tortoise called 'Bass' after William M. (Bill) Bass. Also, during the episode 6.04 they visit a body farm at the BCU Boston Cambridge University.
- During episode 6.17 of Fox's television series Bones entitled "The Feet on the Beach", medical anthropologist Dr. Temperance Brennan and her partner FBI Special Agent Seeley Booth visit a body farm at the fictional University of Hogansburg, New York.
- In episode 2.15 of CSI: Crime Scene Investigation entitled "Burden of Proof" a murder victim's body is dumped at the body farm among other bodies.
- In episode 1.05 of CSI: Vegas entitled "Let the Chips Fall" the CSIs visit a body farm to examine the remains of a woman who had been previously murdered and her body donated to the facility following the investigation into her death.
- A body farm within a forensic training facility is featured in the beginning of episode 9.17 of Fox's television series The X‑Files. The episode, titled "Release", mentions that the facility is located in Joplin, Virginia.
- Simon Beckett's novel Whispers of the Dead is set in and around the body farm in Knoxville, Tennessee. It is the third book in a series centered on protagonist Dr. David Hunter, a forensic anthropologist. The series itself was inspired by Beckett's visit to the body farm in Tennessee.
- During episode 2 of the documentary series Stephen Fry in America, host Stephen Fry visits the University of Tennessee Anthropological Research Facility.
- In episode 3.2 of Law and Order: SVU entitled "Wrath" several murder victims' bodies are dumped at the body farm among other bodies.
- In Tim Dorsey's book Torpedo Juice, Serge and Coleman dump a body in a body farm in the Florida Everglades, located off the Tamiami Trail.
- In episode 9 of Durarara!! x2 Ten Shinra mentions that his father researches the body farm for a local drugstore.
- Photographer Sally Mann's fifth book, What Remains (2003), includes a series of photographs of dead and decomposing bodies taken at the Tennessee Forensic Anthropology Center.
- Filmmakers Brandon Keenan and Nick LaMantia released a film with the working Body Farm on March 1, 2020, on DirecTV, Google Play, Amazon, Microsoft, and Apple TV.
- San Diego death grind band Cattle Decapitation has a song called "A Body Farm" on their 2009 album The Harvest Floor about a serial killer who leaves the bodies of his victims to decompose around his home.
- In 2019, HBO VICE did a 20-minute documentary on the USF-FORT program showing the impact it has on cold case investigations.

== See also ==
- Body donation
- Forensic entomology
- Forensic pathology

== Sources ==
- Bass, Bill & Jefferson, Jon. Death's Acre: Inside the Legendary 'Body Farm' . Time Warner 2003, 300pp. ISBN 0-316-72527-7
- Roach, Mary. Stiff: The Curious Lives of Human Cadavers. W.W. Norton, 2003. 224pp. ISBN 978-0-393-32482-2
