= The Calling of the Grave =

2010 novel by Simon Beckett

- Author: Simon Beckett
- Language: English
- Series: David Hunter
- Release number: Four
- Genre: Crime; Mystery
- Set in: Dartmoor
- Publisher: Bantam
- Publication date: 2010
- Publication place: United Kingdom
- Media type: Print
- Pages: 327
- ISBN: 978-0-593-06345-3
- Preceded by: Whispers of the Dead
- Followed by: The Restless Dead

The Calling of the Grave is the fourth instalment in the Doctor David Hunter Series by Simon Beckett.

== Plot ==
The book starts as a prequel to the entire series as it is set some time before the events of The Chemistry of Death, when David Hunter's wife and Daughter (Kara and Alice) are still alive. Hunter is called out to examine locations for deposition sites of the victims of Jerome Monk, a rapist and killer who was known to have killed at least four people and buried their bodies on Dartmoor.

Monk, who is serving time in Dartmoor prison for his crimes, agrees to help the investigation team find the bodies and he is brought out onto the moor. Whilst a dig is ongoing, Monk uses the confusion of finding some bones to make a run for freedom. He is recaptured, returned to prison and the investigation is wound down.

Eight years later, Monk escapes from prison and sets about targeting all those who were on that investigation and David Hunter finds himself on Dartmoor once again.
