= Kate Spradley =

- Education: University of Arkansas, MA, University of Tennessee, PhD.
- Known for: Enabling identification and repatriation of the remains of migrants who have perished along the Texas-Mexico border
- Awards: MacArthur Fellows Program
- Scientific career
- Fields: Forensic anthropologist

Kate Spradley is an American forensic anthropologist.

Spradley is a professor at Texas State University where she teaches anthropology. In 2013, Spradley founded Operation Identification, a project within the Forensic Anthropology Center at Texas State. Within this program, Spradley and her team partnered with land owners along the Mexico-United States Border to identify exhumed remains. She established a set of reference data and classification criteria to enable these identifications, among the first of its kind to focus on skeletal remains of Latin American origin. This project has helped identify and repatriate the remains of nearly 300 people.

In 2026, Spradley was named a MacArthur Fellow.
