= Ruth Hall (microbiologist) =

Australian microbiologist

Ruth Hall OAM FAA FAAM
- Born: 6 August 1945 (age 81); Sydney, New South Wales
- Education: University of Sydney, University of Edinburgh
- Known for: Discovery of integrons as mechanism of transfer of antimicrobial resistance among bacteria
- Awards: McFarlane Burnet Medal, 2012
- Scientific career
- Fields: Microbiology, Antibiotic resistance

Ruth Milne Hall (born 6 August 1945) is an Australian microbiologist whose research on mobile genetic elements in bacteria has provided deep insight into the transfer and evolution of antibiotic resistance in bacteria.

She attended Hornsby Girls High School and graduated from the University of Sydney with a BSc(Hons) (1966) and MSc (1968) before taking up a scholarship to do a PhD course on bacterial genetics in the MRC Microbial Genetics Unit at the University of Edinburgh (awarded 1971).

== Career ==
After returning to Australia she worked from 1972 to 1975 as a Senior Tutor in the Department of Biochemistry, Monash University and from 1976 to 1979 as a lecturer in the same department. Her research at Monash was on mitochondrial biogenesis and genetics in the yeast Saccharomyces cerevisiae. In 1979-80 she was a Research Fellow in the Department of Microbiology at the John Curtin School of Medical Research, Australian National University and in 1980-81 an EMBO Post Doctoral Research Fellow at the Biozentrum University of Basel, Switzerland where she continued her work on the yeast.

Again returning to Australia she joined in 1982 the research staff at the CSIRO Molecular and Cell Biology Unit, where she worked on integrons and antibiotic resistance genes which contributed to an understanding of how bacteria become resistant to many antibiotics simultaneously, and to a recognition of the risks posed in increased antibiotic use in medicine and agriculture.

After her research unit at CSIRO was closed in 2003 she moved to the University of Sydney as adjunct professor in the School of Molecular and Microbial Biosciences, where her research on the molecular genetics and genomics of bacterial antibiotic resistance has identified further mechanisms for gene transfer between gram negative bacteria.

She has been recognized with the highest awards in Australia for microbiology, received the Macfarlane Burnet Medal in 2012, the Order of Australia Medal in 2014 and was inducted into the National Health and Medical Research Council Hall of Fame in 2014.

== Research ==
Bacteria can adapt rapidly to environmental pressures, including antibiotic use, through acquisition of further genes, and Hall has investigated the role of mobile genetic elements in the development of multiple antibiotic resistance and in bacterial evolution using different Gram negative pathogens including Escherichia coli, Salmonella enterica, Klebsiella pneumoniae and Acinetobacter baumanni. Hall's work has characterized a variety of mobile elements, including plasmids, genomic islands, transposons, gene cassettes and integrons. Gene cassettes are mobile genetic units each carrying only one gene which can be readily transferred into and between larger, stable genetic backbones called integrons that are responsible for moving the cassettes. The integron is also responsible for expression of the genes in cassettes. This exchange of genes between different bacteria enables rapid emergence of resistance under selection pressure of antibiotics.

Hall's recent work has identified large antibiotic resistance gene clusters, including genomic resistance islands in Salmonella, Klebsiella pneumoniae and in Acinetobacter baumanni and examined their evolution. Multiple antibiotic resistance in Acinetobacter baumanni is now being tracked using whole genome analysis.

Spread of resistance between individuals is an increased risk among hospitalized and immunosuppressed patients with Hall's work identifying the role of commensal bacteria, including E. coli in the human colon in the spread of genes. Resistance genes can also reach the human food chain through subtherapeutic antibiotic use as growth promotants in animal production, with Hall contributing to JETACAR (Joint Expert Advisory Committee on Antibiotic Resistance), which, in 2000, developed Australian Government policy on antibiotic use in agriculture. The risks of the rise of "superbugs" from the gene exchange processes described by Hall are recognized internationally as a threat to human health (WHO report on antibiotic resistance, May 2014).

== Honours and awards ==
- 2003 Australian Society for Microbiology BioMerieux Identifying Resistance Award
- 2005 American Society for Microbiology Sanofi-Aventis Award
- 2005 Fellow of the Australian Academy of Science
- 2006 Rubbo Orator, Australian Society for Microbiology
- 2010 Fellow of the American Academy of Microbiology
- 2012 Macfarlane Burnet Medal and Lecture, Australian Academy of Science
- 2014 Order of Australia Medal
- 2014 National Health and Medical Research Council Hall of Fame
