= The Chemistry of Death (TV series) =

German/British television series

- Genre: Thriller
- Created by: Simon Beckett
- Based on: The Chemistry of Death by Simon Beckett
- Written by: Sukey Venables Fisher
- Directed by: Richard Clark
- Starring: Harry Treadaway; Samuel Anderson; Jefferson Hall; Jeanne Goursaud
- Country of origin: United Kingdom
- Original language: English
- No. of seasons: 1
- No. of episodes: 6

Production
- Executive producers: Dixie Linder; Nick Marston; Peter Nadermann; Richard Clark; Simon Beckett; Sukey Venables Fisher
- Producer: Matt Carver
- Cinematography: Tim Sidell
- Editor: Derek Holland
- Running time: 45 minutes
- Production company: Cuba Pictures

Original release
- Network: Paramount+
- Release: 12 January – 16 February 2023

The Chemistry of Death is a German/British television series based on the novel of the same name by crime fiction writer Simon Beckett. The series stars Harry Treadaway, Samuel Anderson, Jefferson Hall and Jeanne Goursaud. It premiered on 12 January 2023 in Germany and on 19 January 2023 in the United Kingdom.

== Plot ==
Based on the best-selling novel The Chemistry of Death, the series tells the story of Dr. David Hunter, who was forced by a tragic stroke of fate to give up his profession as a forensic pathologist. He has set up a new life in a small village called Manham. There he works as a partner to the village doctor, Dr. Maitland. When the local police ask him to help solve a murder case, the ghosts of his past plague him. Now Hunter has to decide whether to turn away or return to his old life, which he actually wanted to leave behind forever. Even as the demons of his past haunt him, Hunter decides to return to work for the police and is drawn into cases that bring him to his limits.

== Cast and characters ==
- Harry Treadaway as David Hunter
- Samuel Anderson as DCI Mackenzie
- Jefferson Hall as Ben Anders
- Jeanne Goursaud as Jenny Krause
- Lucian Msamati as Dr. Henri Maitland
- Neve McIntosh as DS Josie Fraser
- Stuart Campbell as PC Duncan McKinney
- Samuel Creasey as Dan Mason
- Katie Leung as Maggie Cassidy
- Stuart Bowman as Iain Kinross
- David Hayman as Brody
- Amy Manson as Ellen McLeod
- Nick Blood as Michael Strachan
- Amy Nuttall as Grace Strachan
- Hardy Krüger Jr. as Gunther

== Release ==
The series was first announced in June 2022 in conjunction with the announcement that the Paramount+ streaming service would be starting in Germany with their own original programmes. The series was released in January 2023 with one episode per week.

== Episodes ==
=== Season 1 (2023) ===
No. overall	No. in season	Titel (German) / Title	Air date (Paramount+ Germany)	Air date (Paramount+ UK)
1	1	"Der gefallene Engel" / "Fallen Angel"	12 January 2023	19 January 2023
2	2	"Nur noch 48 Stunden" / "Only 48 Hours"	19 January 2023	19 January 2023
3	3	"Wohin der Wind dich trägt" / "Where the Wind Blows You"	26 January 2023	26 January 2023
4	4	"Kalte Asche" / "Written in Bone"	2 February 2023	2 February 2023
5	5	"Insel in Flammen" / "Island On Fire"	9 February 2023	9 February 2023
6	6	"Die Wolken verschwinden" / "The Clouds Disappear"	16 February 2023	16 February 2023
