= Simon Beckett =

British journalist and author (born 1960)

- Born: 20 April 1960 (age 66); Sheffield, England
- Occupations: Journalist and novelist
- Writing career
- Period: 1994–present
- Genre: Crime fiction
- Website: www.simonbeckett.com

Simon Beckett (born 20 April 1960) is a British journalist and author. His books, in particular the crime series around forensic anthropologist Dr David Hunter, have sold 21 million copies worldwide, and have had particular success in Germany and Scandinavia.

== Life and works ==
Simon Beckett was born on 20 April 1960 in Sheffield, England, to a working-class background. After earning a Master of Arts degree in English, Beckett taught in Spain and played in several bands before becoming a freelance journalist. He has written for The Times, The Independent on Sunday, The Daily Telegraph and The Observer, amongst others. He wrote several novels, including Fine Lines in 1994, before publishing the first novel in the David Hunter series, The Chemistry of Death, in 2006. A crime novel centred on a forensic anthropologist, Dr David Hunter, as the protagonist, The Chemistry of Death was shortlisted for the 2006 Gold Dagger award. Sequel novels featuring David Hunter have been released in August 2007 (Written in Bone), January 2009 (Whispers of the Dead), 2010 (The Calling of the Grave), 2017 (The Restless Dead), 2019 (The Scent of Death) and 2026 (The Bone Garden). The series has sold several million copies worldwide and is particularly popular in Germany and Scandinavia.

The books and protagonist were inspired when Beckett visited the University of Tennessee Anthropological Research Facility (the body farm founded by forensic anthropology pioneer Dr Bill Bass) in 2002, doing research for an article for the Daily Telegraph. Having watched—and participated in—"live" exercises involving manufactured crime scenes containing real decaying corpses, and having witnessed the sciences employed to ascertain how, when and where death occurred, Beckett was inspired to create a central character who is, in his own words, "vulnerable" and "very human", while authoritative and knowledgeable regarding forensic anthropology.

Simon Beckett is married and currently lives in Sheffield.

Beckett's novels are very popular in Europe; by 2010 he had sold over four million books outside of the United Kingdom and in the same year had outsold J K Rowling and Ian McEwan in Continental Europe. In February 2019, he was presented with a Ripper Award (the European Prize from Criminal Literature). He received the award jointly with novelist Arne Dahl as they both received the same amount of public vote.

In March 2020, Trapeze Books announced that Beckett had signed a two-book deal with them to release the new Jonah Colley series which revolves around a police officer from the Metropolitan Police in London. The first book, titled The Lost, was released in July 2021.

In 2023, a TV series with 6 episodes named the chemistry of death was released, starring Harry Treadaway as David Hunter, Ellen Francis, and Rosa Whimster, written by Sukey Fisher and directed by Richard Clark.

== Bibliography ==
=== David Hunter series ===
- The Chemistry of Death (2006)
- Written in Bone (2007)
- Whispers of the Dead (2009)
- The Calling of the Grave (2010)
- Cat and Mouse (2013) - ebook
- Snowfall and a Normal Day (2016) - ebook
- The Restless Dead (2017)
- The Scent of Death (2019)
- The Bone Garden (2026)

=== Jonah Colley series ===
- The Lost (2021)

=== Other novels ===
- Fine Lines (1994)
- Animals (1995)
- Where There's Smoke (1997)
- Owning Jacob (1998)
- Stone Bruises (2014)
