= The Restless Dead =

2017 novel by Simon Beckett

- First edition
- Author: Simon Beckett
- Language: English
- Series: David Hunter
- Release number: 5
- Genre: Crime, Mystery
- Set in: Essex, England
- Publisher: Bantam Books
- Publication date: 6 April 2017
- Publication place: United Kingdom
- Media type: Hardback book
- Pages: 404
- ISBN: 978-0593-06347-7
- Preceded by: The Calling of the Grave
- Followed by: The Scent of Death

The Restless Dead is the fifth novel in writer Simon Beckett's Doctor David Hunter crime series. It was first published in English in April 2017.

== Plot ==
Dr Hunter is back working in London and at a low ebb professionally, as he was the scapegoat for what went wrong in the last novel (The Calling of the Grave). When a call comes out of the blue from a Detective Inspector in Essex about recovering a body from some tidal mudflats, Hunter jumps at the chance to be working for the police again.

The body is thought to be that of a wealthy young man who went missing, only Dr Hunter is not convinced and actually proves the body is not that of the missing man.

The setting is the coast of Essex with an estuary and its many inlets and narrow waterways. The bodies and the mysteries pile up with Hunter also getting too close to some of the major suspects and a possible resurgence of an old character at the end.

== Publishing ==
Due to Simon Beckett's popularity in Germany, the book was published in German as Totenfang (German: Catch of [the] Dead) in October 2016 some 6 months before the United Kingdom release.
