= Written in Bone =

2007 novel by Simon Beckett

- First UK edition
- Author: Simon Beckett
- Language: English
- Genre: Crime fiction, Mystery
- Published: 2007
- Publisher: Bantam Press (UK); Delacorte Press (US)
- Publication place: Scotland
- Media type: Book
- Pages: 328
- ISBN: 9780385340052
- OCLC: 123767270
- Preceded by: The Chemistry of Death
- Followed by: Whispers of the Dead

Written in Bone is a novel written by the British crime fiction writer Simon Beckett, first published in 2007. It is the second novel to feature Dr. David Hunter.

Set in the Outer Hebrides, this crime novel features forensic anthropologist Dr. David Hunter. In this volume, he is called in to examine a badly burned body found in a deserted house on a small island while contending with both personal and professional obstacles. It received positive reviews as being better than Beckett's first novel, with satisfying plot twists and well-implemented scientific details.
