= 2000 Summer Olympics torch relay =

- Host city: Sydney, Australia
- Countries visited: Greece, Guam, Palau, Micronesia, Nauru, the Solomon Islands, Papua New Guinea, Samoa, American Samoa, the Cook Islands, Tonga, New Zealand, Australia
- Distance: 27,000 km in Australia; 36,000 km total
- Torchbearers: 800 in Greece; 1,500 in Oceania and New Zealand; 11,000 in Australia
- Start date: 10 May 2000
- End date: 15 September 2000
- Torch designer: Robert Jurgens at Blue Sky
- No. of torches: 14,000

The 2000 Summer Olympics torch relay was the transferral of the Olympic Flame to Sydney, Australia, that built up to the 2000 Summer Olympics. The torch travelled to various island nations as part of a tour of Oceania before beginning an extensive journey around Australia. For the first time the Flame was taken underwater, with a special flare-like torch taken on a dive down to the Great Barrier Reef. At the opening ceremony the cauldron was lit by Aboriginal athlete Cathy Freeman.

== Torch ==
The design of the torch reflected three famed areas of Australian culture: the boomerang, the Sydney Opera House, and the waters of the Pacific Ocean. The concept also reflected the elements of earth, fire, and water. This was achieved across three layers of the torch. The first, inner layer contains the fuel system and combustor, the second contains the fuel canister, and the outer layer is a specially textured aluminium shell. A combination of copper, brass, aluminium, and stainless steel was used in its construction, and the fuel comprised 65 percent butane and 35 percent propane. In total, 14,000 torches were produced. The distance covered by each torchbearer was 105.478 km.

== Torchbearers ==
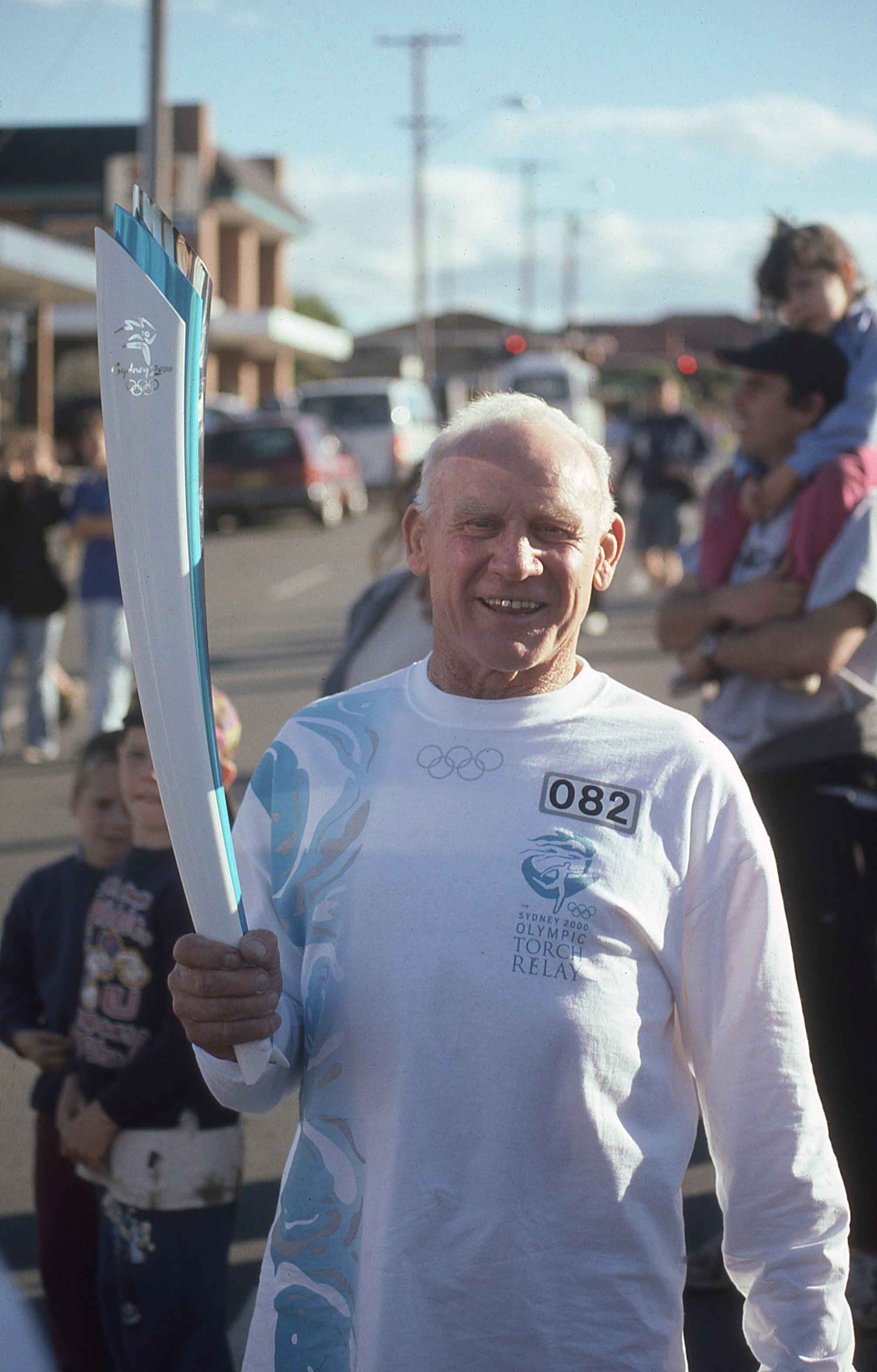
Fred Atkins taking the Torch through Taree, New South Wales

A total of 13,400 torch-bearers were involved in the relay. The Greek leg of the route saw 800 people carry the torch, while 1,500 people were involved across Oceania. As part of the vast traversal of Australia, 11,000 people carried the torch within the country. Anna Booth was the Australian who chaired the 2000 Summer Olympics torch relay committee and she brought the torch to Australian soil on 8 June.

The first Australian torch-bearer was Sophie Gosper in May, the daughter of International Olympic Committee (IOC) Vice-President Kevan Gosper. Her selection caused considerable controversy with accusations of corruption directed at the Hellenic Olympic Committee (HOC). Greek-Australian Yianna Souleles was originally due to receive the torch in Olympia but she was replaced at late notice by Gosper. Kevan Gosper accepted the invitation for his daughter to carry the torch while claiming to be unaware that this would make her the first Australian to have the honour.

The HOC's invitation was seen as an attempt to carry favour with the IOC after being warned that its delays put the planned 2004 Olympics (scheduled to be held in Greece) in jeopardy. Gosper's acceptance of the invitation was portrayed by the media as being nepotistic and inappropriate, with Australian politicians, Olympic athletes, and officials from various Olympic Committees condemning the move. Gosper initially defended his actions but would go on to make a public apology, claiming that fatherly pride had clouded his judgement. He gave up his role in the relay at the Melbourne Cricket Ground despite having previously described it as "the most important moment of my life since I won a silver medal [there]".

== Route ==
The Flame was lit during a ceremony in Olympia, as has been tradition at all the Summer Games since those in 1936. The Flame is initiated by using a parabolic mirror that concentrates the sun's rays. However, due to some cloud cover on the day of the ceremony, there was insufficient sunlight to create the required level of heat. A backup, lit on the previous day during rehearsals, was used instead. The remainder of the ceremony could then take place.

The relay always begins in Greece and travels from Olympia to Athens and the Panathenaic Stadium. The Hellenic Olympic Committee arranged for the torch to be taken to several Greek islands, a first in the history of Olympic relays. The torch arrived in Athens on 20 May, after which it began a tour of Oceania. The Flame was flown firstly to Guam, before moving to Palau, Micronesia, Nauru, the Solomon Islands, Papua New Guinea, Vanuatu, Samoa, American Samoa, the Cook Islands, Tonga, and New Zealand. The relay had been scheduled to visit Fiji, but the country was omitted due to ongoing government instability at that time.

After the island tour the Flame arrived in Australia on 8 June. The relay was an extensive journey around the country, involving 11,000 torch-bearers and a variety of modes of transport. On 27 June the Flame was taken underwater, a first in the history of torch relays. Marine biologist Wendy Craig Duncan carried a special version of the torch for a three-minute trip around Agincourt Reef, a section of the Great Barrier Reef popular with divers. The torch was modified to carry a specially designed flare that would burn at 2,000 degrees Celsius underwater while remaining as aesthetically similar to the normal flame as possible.

== Route in Greece ==
May 10 (day 1)

- Olympia, Pyrgos, Amaliada, Tripoli

May 20 (day 2)

- Athens

May 20 (day 3)

- Panathenaic Stadium

== Route in Oceania (Pacific Islands) ==
Date	Map
May 22 (day 1): Hagåtña, Guam; May 23 (day 2): Koror, Palau; May 24 (day 3): Palikir, Federated States of Micronesia; May 25 (day 4): Yaren, Nauru; May 26 (day 5): Honiara, Solomon Islands; May 27 (day 6): Port Moresby, Papua New Guinea; May 28 (day 7): Port Vila, Vanuatu; May 29 (day 8): Apia, Samoa; May 30 (day 9): Pago Pago, American Samoa; May 31 (day 10): Avarua, Cook Islands; June 2 (day 11): Nukuʻalofa, Tonga	2000 Summer Olympics torch relay is located in Oceania

== Route in New Zealand ==
Date	Map
June 5 (day 12): Queenstown; June 5 (day 12): Christchurch; June 6 (day 13): Wellington; June 7 (day 14): Rotorua; June 7 (day 14): Auckland	2000 Summer Olympics torch relay is located in New Zealand

== Route in Australia ==
The torch was brought off the plane by Anna Booth who chaired the 2000 Summer Olympics Torch Relay Committee. She met Governor-General, Sir William Deane, at Uluru and that began the torch's journey in Australia on 8 June. Booth later noted that this was the greatest honour of her life.

Date	Map
June 8 (day 1): Uluṟu-Kata Tjuṯa National Park; June 8 (day 1): Yulara; June 8 (day 1): Alice Springs	2000 Summer Olympics torch relay is located in Northern Territory
June 9 (day 2): Mount Isa; June 10 (day 3): Longreach; June 10 (day 3): Toowoomba; June 11 (day 4): Warwick; June 11 (day 4): Coolangatta; June 12 (day 5): Southport; June 12 (day 5): Woodridge; June 13 (day 6): Nathan; June 13 (day 6): Ipswich; June 14 (day 7): Mount Coot-tha; June 14 (day 7)): Brisbane; June 15 (day 8): Redcliffe; June 15 (day 8): Bokarina; June 16 (day 9): Nambour; June 16 (day 9): Tewantin; June 17 (day 10): Cherbourg; June 17 (day 10): Kingaroy; June 18 (day 11): Maryborough; June 18 (day 11): Hervey Bay; June 19 (day 12): Bundaberg; June 20 (day 13): Gladstone; June 20 (day 13): Rockhampton; June 21 (day 14): Blackwater; June 21 (day 14): Emerald; June 22 (day 15): Moranbah; June 22 (day 15): Mackay; June 23 (day 16): Proserpine; June 23 (day 16): Airlie Beach; June 24 (day 17): Ayr; June 24 (day 17): Townsville; June 25 (day 18): Tully; June 25 (day 18): Innisfail; June 26 (day 19): Atherton; June 26 (day 19): Cairns; June 27 (day 20): Port Douglas; June 28 (day 21): Thursday Island	2000 Summer Olympics torch relay is located in Queensland
June 28 (day 21): Katherine; June 29 (day 22): Kakadu National Park; June 29 (day 22): Nguiu; June 29 (day 22): Darwin	2000 Summer Olympics torch relay is located in Northern Territory
June 30 (day 23): Kununurra Airport; June 30 (day 23): Broome; July 1 (day 24): Port Hedland Airport; July 1 (day 24): Karratha Airport; July 1 (day 24): Carnarvon; July 2 (day 25): Geraldton; July 2 (day 25): Albany; July 3 (day 26): Walpole-Nornalup National Park; July 3 (day 26): Manjimup; July 4 (day 27): Busselton; July 4 (day 27): Bunbury; July 5 (day 28): Pinjarra; July 5 (day 28): Mandurah; July 6 (day 29): Rockingham; July 6 (day 29): Fremantle; July 7 (day 30): Joondalup; July 8 (day 31): Nedlands; July 8 (day 31): Victoria Park; July 9 (day 32): York; July 9 (day 32): Northam; July 10 (day 33): Merredin; July 10 (day 33): Kalgoorlie	2000 Summer Olympics torch relay is located in Western Australia
July 11 (day 34): Journey aboard the Indian Pacific
July 12 (day 35): Port Lincoln; July 12 (day 35): Port Pirie; July 13 (day 36): Clare; July 13 (day 36): Tanunda; July 14 (day 37): Gawler; July 14 (day 37): Tea Tree Gully; July 15 (day 38): Glenelg; July 15 (day 38): Adelaide; July 16 (day 39): Hahndorf; July 16 (day 39): Murray Bridge; July 17 (day 40): Bordertown; July 17 (day 40): Naracoorte; July 18 (day 41): Naracoorte Caves; July 18 (day 41): Penola; July 18 (day 41): Mount Gambier	2000 Summer Olympics torch relay is located in South Australia
July 19 (day 42): Hamilton; July 19 (day 42): Portland; July 20 (day 43): Port Fairy; July 20 (day 43): Warrnambool; July 21 (day 44): Port Campbell; July 21 (day 44): Colac; July 22 (day 45): Camperdown; July 22 (day 45): Ararat; July 23 (day 46): Stawell; July 23 (day 46): Horsham; July 24 (day 47): St Arnaud; July 24 (day 47): Swan Hill; July 25 (day 48): Kerang; July 25 (day 48): Echuca; July 26 (day 49): Kyabram; July 26 (day 49): Shepparton; July 27 (day 50): Bendigo; July 27 (day 50): Maryborough; July 28 (day 51): Castlemaine; July 28 (day 51): Ballarat; July 29 (day 52): Geelong; July 29 (day 52): Flemington; July 30 (day 53): Banyule; July 30 (day 53): Monash University; July 31 (day 54): Melbourne	2000 Summer Olympics torch relay is located in Victoria
July 31 (day 54): Journey aboard the Spirit of Tasmania
August 1 (day 55): Burnie; August 1 (day 55): Queenstown; August 2 (day 56): Glenorchy; August 3 (day 57): Kingston; August 3 (day 57): Hobart; August 4 (day 58): Campbell Town; August 4 (day 58): Launceston; August 5 (day 59): Deloraine	2000 Summer Olympics torch relay is located in Tasmania
August 5 (day 59): Journey aboard the Spirit of Tasmania
August 7 (day 61): Berwick; August 7 (day 61): Morwell; August 8 (day 62): Sale; August 8 (day 62): Bairnsdale; August 9 (day 63): Moe; August 9 (day 63): Warragul; August 10 (day 64): Emerald; August 10 (day 64): Healesville; August 11 (day 65): Alexandra; August 11 (day 65): Seymour; August 12 (day 66): Benalla; August 12 (day 66): Wangaratta; August 13 (day 67): Bright; August 13 (day 67): Mount Hotham	2000 Summer Olympics torch relay is located in Victoria
August 14 (day 68): Albury; August 15 (day 69): Finley; August 15 (day 69): Griffith; August 16 (day 70): Narrandera; August 16 (day 70): Wagga Wagga; August 17 (day 71): Cootamundra; August 17 (day 71): Cowra; August 18 (day 72): West Wyalong; August 18 (day 72): Parkes; August 19 (day 73): Mildura; August 19 (day 73): Broken Hill; August 20 (day 74): Bourke; August 20 (day 74): Moree; August 21 (day 75): Inverell; August 21 (day 75): Armidale; August 22 (day 76): Glen Innes; August 22 (day 76): Tenterfield; August 23 (day 77): Lismore; August 23 (day 77): Ballina; August 24 (day 78): Grafton; August 24 (day 78): Coffs Harbour; August 25 (day 79): Kempsey; August 25 (day 79): Port Macquarie; August 26 (day 80): Taree; August 26 (day 80): Forster; August 27 (day 81): Raymond Terrace; August 27 (day 81): Newcastle; August 28 (day 82): Speers Point; August 28 (day 82): Gosford; August 29 (day 83): Wyong; August 29 (day 83): Cessnock; August 30 (day 84): Maitland; August 30 (day 84): Muswellbrook; August 31 (day 85): Quirindi; August 31 (day 85): Tamworth; September 1 (day 86): Coonabarabran; September 1 (day 86): Dubbo; September 2 (day 87): Orange; September 2 (day 87): Bathurst; September 3 (day 88): Katoomba; September 3 (day 88): Penrith; September 4 (day 89): Campbelltown; September 4 (day 89): Bowral; September 5 (day 90): Goulburn	2000 Summer Olympics torch relay is located in New South Wales
September 5 (day 90): Canberra; September 6 (day 91): Belconnen; September 6 (day 91): Phillip	2000 Summer Olympics torch relay is located in Australian Capital Territory
September 7 (day 92): Cooma; September 7 (day 92): Thredbo; September 8 (day 93): Merimbula; September 8 (day 93): Bega; September 9 (day 94): Narooma; September 9 (day 94): Batemans Bay; September 10 (day 95): Nowra; September 10 (day 95): Kiama; September 11 (day 96): Wollongong	2000 Summer Olympics torch relay is located in New South Wales
September 11 (day 96): Cronulla; September 12 (day 97): Liverpool; September 12 (day 97): Parramatta; September 13 (day 98): Pennant Hills; September 13 (day 98): Hunters Hill; September 14 (day 99): La Perouse; September 14 (day 99): Sydney; September 15 (day 100): Manly; September 15 (day 100): Sydney Olympic Park; September 15 (day 100): Olympic Stadium	2000 Summer Olympics torch relay is located in Sydney

== Lighting of the cauldron ==
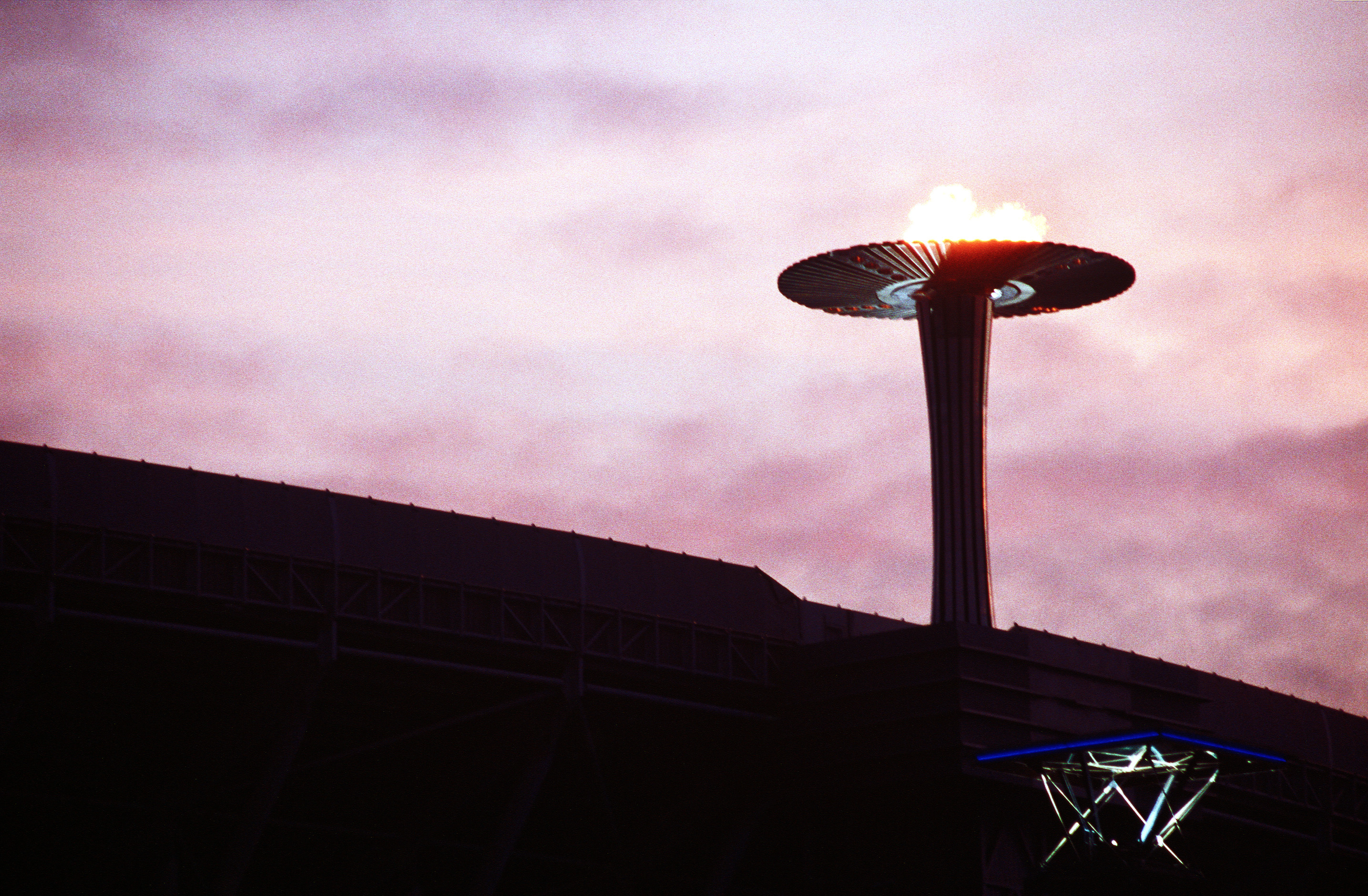
The Olympic cauldron

The Australian middle distance gold-medallist Herb Elliott carried the torch into Stadium Australia and passed it on to the final runners. The final succession of torch-bearers were selected to celebrate the 100 year anniversary of female participation in the Olympic Games (women were not allowed to compete at the inaugural 1896 Summer Olympics but were given the opportunity in 1900). Betty Cuthbert, Raelene Boyle, Dawn Fraser, Shirley Strickland, Shane Gould, and Debbie Flintoff-King, all medallists in previous Games, were given the honour of carrying the Flame before passing it to the final torch-bearer.

The cauldron was lit by Aboriginal athlete Cathy Freeman, a decision that was at the time reported as being a "bold political and social statement". Freeman was the first competing athlete to light the Olympic cauldron. Two elements from the torch concept, fire and water, were replicated in the design of the cauldron. Freeman stood atop a pool of water and lit a flame that surrounded her. Though a computer glitch delayed proceedings for a few minutes the Flame then lifted around Freeman.

The ten-year anniversary of the Games was celebrated in a special ceremony in 2010. Cathy Freeman and Paralympic champion Louise Sauvage (who was the final torchbearer at the Paralympic Games) lit the cauldron during an event attended by numerous athletes and school students. The twenty-year anniversary of the Games was celebrated in a special ceremony in 2020. The cauldron was re-lit by two up-and-coming athletes; Indigenous basketballer Tenayah Logan and teenage Paralympian Tamsin Colley. It was attended by Ian Thorpe, Louise Sauvage and local Sydneysiders who were volunteers during the games. Freeman sent a video message.
