= Constance Le Plastrier =

Australian schoolteacher, botanist and writer

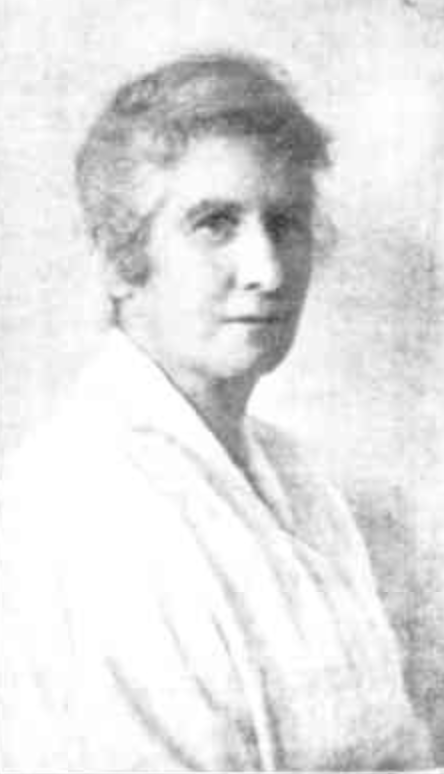
- Le Plastrier in 1923
- Born: 23 January 1864; St Kilda, Victoria, Australia
- Died: 7 February 1938 (aged 74); North Sydney, New South Wales, Australia
- Writing career
- Pen name: Erica; Mary Lee

Constance Mary Le Plastrier (23 January 1864 – 7 February 1938) was an Australian schoolteacher, botanist and writer. She was the first woman to be elected president of the Field Naturalists' Society of New South Wales. Shortly before her death she received the Pro Ecclesia et Pontifice medal established by Pope Leo XIII.

== Life ==
Le Plastrier was born in St Kilda, Victoria on 23 January 1864. She began her teaching career in Melbourne, at Presentation Convent and in 1895 she converted to Roman Catholicism.

With her sister, she moved to Sydney in 1900. She was subsequently employed by the Redlands School in Cremorne, teaching English, Latin and botany. It was at Redlands that she taught Thistle Stead, and fostered her interest in Australia's flora, before Stead went on to study botany at university.

She was a long-term contributor to both the Catholic Press and Sacred Heart Messenger. Her 1916 textbook, Botany for Australian Students, co-written with Agnes A. Brewster, was considered "the best work to date on Australian botany, a book which has obtained a high reputation in botanical circles, at home and abroad". She also worked in teacher education, lecturing on nature study at the Sydney Kindergarten Teachers College.

She joined the Field Naturalists' Society of New South Wales in about 1912 and in 1919 was elected president, the first woman to fill that role. In 1922, she became its first female secretary. At the same time she was president of the Assistant Mistresses' Association, honorary secretary of the Teachers' Guild of NSW (since c.1913) and was involved with editing the Guild's journal. She was also the honorary editor of Microscopical Society of New South Wales' journal. In her long career, she was additionally on the council of Sancta Sophia College, University of Sydney, and was a member of the Linnean Society of New South Wales, the Classical Association of New South Wales, the Shakespeare Society of New South Wales, and the Mathematical Association of New South Wales.

Le Plastrier died in the Mater Misericordiae private hospital in North Sydney on 7 February 1938. She was survived by three sisters and two brothers. Her funeral left her home at 22 Provincial Road, Lindfield for the Northern Suburbs Cemetery.

== Works ==
=== As herself ===
- Le Plastrier, Constance M. (1910), Heirs in exile, William P. Linehan
- Brewster, Agnes A.; Le Plastrier, Constance M. (1916), Botany for Australian students, Dymock's Book Arcade
- Le Plastrier, Constance M. (1929), The Cloudy Porch, Sands
- Le Plastrier, Constance M. (c. 1929), A garland of hope : stories on the promises made to Blessed Margaret Mary by Our Lord Jesus Christ., Australian Catholic Truth Society
- Le Plastrier, Constance M. (1933), The story of our plants: First steps in Australian botany, Nangle, E. M. (illustrator), Shakespeare Head Press

=== As Mary Lee ===
- Lee, Mary (1929–30), "The Heir of Tramore" (serialised), Catholic Press
- Lee, Mary (1930–31), "Tempering the Steel" (serialised), Catholic Press
