= Eddie Canales =

Human rights and labor activist

- Born: January 12, 1948
- Died: July 30, 2024 (aged 76)
- Known for: Human rights advocacy

Eduardo Osiel Canales (January 12, 1948 – July 30, 2024) was an American human rights advocate and labor organizer. Seeking to promote the welfare of migrants crossing the Mexico–United States border into South Texas, he installed some 200 water stations along the border, some along routes used by immigrants to avoid a checkpoint along U.S. Route 281. He also helped coordinate rescue missions and sometimes assisted in the recovery of remains of people who died from dehydration and temperature extremes. He founded the South Texas Human Rights Center, a nonprofit intended to prevent the death and suffering of migrants on the border.

== Biography ==
=== Early life ===
Born to migrant farmworkers from the Rio Grande Valley, Eddie Canales grew up in Corpus Christi, Texas. He was raised bilingual and learned to read from a young age. As a child, he worked various jobs to help support his family, like shining shoes, sweeping a barbershop floor, and cleaning a cafeteria. He attended several schools in south Texas, including Sam Houston Elementary School in Corpus Christi. He graduated from W. B. Ray High School in 1966, after which he attended Del Mar College while supporting himself by cleaning airplanes for Eastern Airlines.

=== Secondary education ===
By 1968 he was a student at the University of Houston, where, spurred by the United Farm Workers and the Delano grape strike, he became involved in union organizing. He joined the Mexican American Youth Organization, and campaigned for the Raza Unida Party, an offshoot that advocated for Chicano rights. He unsuccessfully campaigned to become a state representative in 1976.

=== Career ===
After leaving the college without a degree, he helped start Centro Aztlan, a community center in Houston that worked with undocumented immigrants. In 1986 he moved to Denver, where he represented janitors as an organizer for the Service Employees International Union. In 1998 he became an organizer for the United Brotherhood of Carpenters and Joiners of America and sought to recruit more Hispanic immigrants into the union. Eventually returning to Texas, he was encouraged by his friend Maria Jimenez, another immigrant rights activist, to become involved in Brooks County. He founded the South Texas Human Rights center in 2013, seeking to mitigate the deaths of undocumented immigrants trying to avoid a nearby border checkpoint; in 2012, 129 bodies were recovered, and about five times as many are estimated to have not been found.

==== Advocacy in migrant body identification ====
In 2014, Canales and other activists pushed for the enforcement of a Texas law mandating that unidentified bodies be DNA tested. He also argued for the exhumation of unidentified bodies in the county cemetery, which would allow identification and potentially comfort their families. Researchers exhuming migrants from mass graves for this purpose found that some had been buried in trash bags, body bags, shopping bags, or without containers at all. One body bag was discovered containing the bones of three separate people. 20 bodies had been identified as of 2017. The bodies were found under small markers marked with the name of the local funeral home, Funeraria del Angel Howard-Williams, which county officials in Brooks County and the neighboring Jim Hogg County stated had been paid by the county to bury the bodies of immigrants since at least 1998 and 1992 respectively. In 2020, Canales appeared in the documentary Missing in Brooks County.

=== Death ===
He died July 30, 2024, after a months-long battle with pancreatic cancer.
