= Benton fireworks disaster =

1983 industrial disaster in Benton, Tennessee, United States

- Debris scattered near the site and damage to nearby cars
- Date: May 27, 1983
- Time: c. 9:15 AM (EDT)
- Location: 1278 Welcome Valley Road, Benton, Tennessee; 35°8′42″N 84°39′50″W
- Also known as: Polk County fireworks disaster
- Cause: Undetermined
- Deaths: 11
- Injuries: 1
- Convicted: 21

The Benton fireworks disaster was an industrial disaster that occurred on May 27, 1983, on a farm near Benton, Tennessee. A powerful explosion at an unlicensed fireworks factory producing illegal fireworks killed eleven and injured one, revealing the existence of the factory for the first time to law enforcement and the public. The initial explosion was heard more than 20 mi (32 km) away.

The event gained national attention, covered by multiple media outlets, and triggered a two-year federal investigation that eventually led to the conviction of 21 people including the owner of the factory, a man who was considered to be the mastermind, and several others from multiple states who conspired to manufacture, transport, and/or allow the fireworks manufactured at the operation to be transported. Investigators determined the factory to have been the largest and most profitable known illegal fireworks operation in US history. The explosion was also the deadliest illegal-fireworks-related disaster in US history.

== Background ==
Webb's Bait Farm, located along Welcome Valley Road near an intersection with Reynolds Bridge Road and Pankey Lane in rural Polk County about two miles (3.2 km) south of Benton, raised worms and other fishing bait and sold fishing equipment. It had been in operation since 1978 and was owned by Dan Lee Webb, aged 30 at the time of the disaster. In addition to the farm, Webb also owned a masonry business.

In December 1982, Webb, relative David Parks, and Howard Emmett Bramblett of nearby Ocoee began manufacturing M-80 and M-100 fireworks, which are banned by federal laws, in an old metal dairy barn on the farm. Bramblett, who owned a fireworks store in Benton and was an acquaintance of Webb, suggested that Webb begin the operation to combat financial problems. He reportedly taught Webb and Parks how to manufacture these fireworks, and connected them with suppliers of materials and distributors in multiple states. He was considered by authorities to be the mastermind of the operation. Each fireworks case, which contained 1,440 individual fireworks, was sold for $160 (equivalent to $517 in 2025), with Bramblett, who was responsible for selling the fireworks, and John Franklin Miller, an Ohio fireworks manufacturer who was the primary supplier of materials and was responsible for soliciting customers, each receiving $10 (equivalent to $32 in 2025). Both men had a history of involvement with illegal fireworks, and had helped start other unlawful fireworks manufacturing operations, some of which exploded and killed workers. The factory employed several people, all of whom were reportedly related to Webb by blood or marriage and were out of work or underemployed at the time.

The two-story 40-by-70-foot (12 m × 21 m) barn that housed the factory consisted of a chemical mixing room on the first floor and an assembly room on the second floor. A former employee, whose mother and daughter were killed in the blast, stated that they were paid five dollars an hour (equivalent to $16 in 2025) in cash. Other relatives of the victims stated that the explosives were usually mixed by hand. Most employees were not aware of the dangers involved, and were not educated in safe working conditions. Between December 1982 and the date of the explosion, a total of 1,542,880 M-series fireworks were reported to have been manufactured at the factory and distributed to at least 12 states. The factory was determined to have accumulated a profit of about $1.25 million (equivalent to $4.04 million in 2024) during its operation. At its peak, the factory ran a minimum of six days a week, employed between 12 and 14 people, and produced between 100 and 130 cases of fireworks a week. At some point in the months prior to the explosion, the Polk County Sheriff's Office, Tennessee Bureau of Investigation (TBI), and the Bureau of Alcohol, Tobacco, and Firearms (ATF) had received word of an illegal fireworks manufacturing operation in the area, but were uncertain of the location.

== Explosion and response ==
On May 27, 1983, at approximately 9:15 am, 11 workers were on duty when a cache of M-80 and M-100 explosives, flash powder, and other chemicals in the barn detonated, producing a powerful explosion and instantly killing all 11 workers and leveling the barn. The initial blast was followed over the next several minutes by several smaller blasts which witnesses described as sounding like shotguns, believed to have been from individual firework cases which were not detonated initially. Dan Lee Webb's cousin Tommy Webb, who was mowing the grass near the site, was reported to have been thrown more than 70 yards (64 m; 210 ft). The blast also threw debris as far as 200 yards (180 m; 600 ft) from the site, and produced a shock wave that leveled trees as far as 100 yards (91 m; 300 ft) away. The force of the blast shattered windows in several homes and other structures on nearby properties, which reportedly resulted in some neighbors receiving minor cut wounds. Parts of bodies were hurled through the roofs of the nearby house and carport and as far away as 500 feet (150 m; 170 yd) from the site. Nothing in the barn was left intact; all of the bodies had lost limbs and six were decapitated. Some were stripped of clothing by the force of the blast.

Several witnesses claimed to have seen a white mushroom cloud which was estimated to be 600 to 800 feet (180 to 240 m) tall, and the blast was heard and felt in Cleveland over 20 miles (32 km) away. Several 911 calls were received moments after the initial blast, and within minutes, several police units arrived at the scene. Webb's wife Linda Sue, who was in the house at the time, fled before deputies arrived. Tommy Webb, who was critically injured, was taken to Erlanger Medical Center in Chattanooga with burns to about 35 percent of his body. Crews from the ATF and TBI arrived later to investigate the cause of the explosion. A Tennessee Emergency Management Agency (TEMA) crew, which included forensic anthropologist William M. Bass of the University of Tennessee in Knoxville, later arrived on the scene to identify the victims.

== Investigation ==
Authorities were unable to determine the exact cause of the explosion, but concluded that it probably occurred as a result of explosives being mixed. The charred remains of an electric drill with a paint-stirring attachment were found, and the prevailing theory of the cause was that a spark from the drill's motor reached the mixture. Investigators concluded that other possible causes could have been sparking from an electrical wire, light fixture, or other appliance found at the site; and the scraping of boots on the floor. A cigarette lighter and three packs of cigarettes were also found at the site, which investigators determined could have caused the ignition of highly explosive vapors that were byproducts of the manufacturing process. ATF agents estimated that approximately 300 pounds (140 kg) of explosives were detonated in the blast. TEMA later identified the dead as Faye Trentham (38), Tanya Trentham (19, daughter of Faye), Doris Burns Longmire (29), David Nelce Webb (22, brother of Dan Lee Webb), Sybil Duggan (34), William Lee Burns (38), Beatrice Webb (51, mother of Dan Lee Webb), Dixie Freeman (21), David Parks (38) and his wife Judy (36), and Albert Kenneth Johnson (53, uncle of Dan Lee Webb).

Authorities found a cache of 172 boxes of unexploded fireworks worth about $20,000 (equivalent to $64,651 in 2025) and estimated to weigh more than 2,500 pounds (1,100 kg) and six 55-US-gallon (210 L) steel drums full of chemical explosives in a nearby trailer. Federal firearms agents also found a firework case eight to ten inches (twenty to thirty centimetres) in length and three to four inches (eight to ten centimetres) in diameter which, due to the large size, prompted Polk County investigators to speculate that some of the explosives were designed for and being purchased by people with criminal intent, such as terrorists. However, in the opinion of TBI investigator Dr C. C. Blake, "It was a fireworks factory, period." The undetonated explosives were later detonated in an open pit in nearby Copperhill having been used as evidence in Webb's trial. The farm was also found to be guarded by an elaborate security system which consisted of surveillance cameras, electric fences, alarms, guard dogs, and warning signs. Polk County Sheriff Frank Payne told reporters that he thought that they were likely gearing up for the Fourth of July.

Polk County police and multiple media outlets interviewed several people living near the farm. One man, who had been unaware of the fireworks operation, stated that he had "been wondering all this time how they could employ as many people as what they did just growing worms". One neighbor said that the blast shattered his windows and blew sheetrock off his ceiling. He had been told by the Webbs three months prior that they did not want his children to go near the barn. Another neighbor said that he had heard one large blast followed by several smaller blasts over the course of about 20 minutes, and that the initial blast had shattered glass in his living room. Sheriff Payne, a Vietnam War veteran, said that he "hadn't seen anything like this since Vietnam," and equated the explosion to a direct hit from a powerful bomb. Many friends and relatives of the victims who were interviewed stated that they did not know about the operation and were surprised to learn of it.

== Aftermath ==
Dan Lee Webb, who had been in Lansing, Illinois, delivering 86,400 M-80s during the event, surrendered at the Polk County Jail two days later. He was charged with 11 counts of involuntary manslaughter and illegally manufacturing and possessing explosives and jailed with a $300,000 (equivalent to $969,763 in 2025) bond. Linda Sue Webb was held on $50,000 (equivalent to $161,627 in 2025) bail as a material witness in order to ensure her appearance in court. She told her defense attorney that she believed that her husband was in the New York– New Jersey area at the time of the blast. Webb's brother Larry was also held as a material witness with a $50,000 (equivalent to $161,627 in 2025) bond, but released shortly thereafter. On April 19, 1984, Dan Lee Webb received a ten-year federal prison sentence for manufacturing explosives without a license. On May 1, 1984, he pleaded guilty to the manslaughter charges and received a ten-year prison sentence. He served it concurrently with the federal sentence and in addition was fined $10,000 (equivalent to $30,990 in 2025).

Bramblett was arrested two days later in nearby Chatsworth, Georgia, after cases of M-80 fireworks were found in two locations in Murray County. He was extradited to the Polk County Jail. A federal court jury convicted him and another man on May 3, 1984, of one count of manufacturing illegal fireworks, one of conspiracy, and one of storing the homemade explosives. He was sentenced to ten years in prison on July 2, 1984, for his role in a similar incident that occurred on May 24, 1983, in Rowesville, South Carolina, in which an explosion at an illegal fireworks operation killed two and injured five.

On August 27, 1985, 20 people from nine different states, including Bramblett and Miller, were indicted on federal charges for conspiring to supply materials, manufacture, sell, and distribute the illegal fireworks made at the farm to as many as twelve states including Tennessee, Georgia, North Carolina, South Carolina, Illinois, Michigan, Indiana, Ohio, Pennsylvania, and New York. Some of these people were also charged with transporting the fireworks or causing them to be transported. On June 25, 1986, Bramblett, Miller, and two of the others charged were found guilty by a federal jury of conspiracy in the operation. The sixteen others pled guilty. A few weeks later on July 7, a U.S. District Court Judge gave Bramblett a ten-year sentence for one count of participating in the illegal manufacture of explosives, concurrent ten-year terms for fifteen counts of causing illegal fireworks to be transported across state lines, and one count of illegally dealing in explosives. He served that time concurrently with his 1984 sentence.

A chapter of American author Jon Jefferson's 2007 non-fiction book Beyond the Body Farm, coauthored with Bass, is about Bass' investigation of the event. A segment about the event is also included in Tennessee Tragedies: Natural, Technological, and Societal Disasters in the Volunteer State, a 2012 book by former TEMA official Allen R. Coggins. A chapter about the disaster is included in historian Dewaine A. Speaks' 2019 book Historic Disasters of East Tennessee. The land is now occupied by a rafting company by the name of Big Frog Expeditions.

== See also ==
- List of explosions
- List of fireworks accidents and incidents
- List of industrial disasters
