= Shari Forbes =

Forensic scientist and researcher

Shari L. Forbes
- Born: 15 October 1977 (age 48); Brewarrina
- Occupation: Professor of thanatology
- Known for: expertise in human body decay

Professor Shari L. Forbes (born 15 October 1977) is an Australian and Canadian forensic scientist and researcher. She is a thanatology expert on the decomposition of human bodies. She created a body farm in Australia and between 2019 and 2022 established a similar facility in Canada, connected to the Forensic Science department at Université du Québec à Trois-Rivières (UQTR). As of January 2023, she is a full professor in chemistry and biochemistry at the University of Windsor, and is hoping to start the first body farm in Ontario in the coming years.

== Life ==
Forbes was born in 1977 in Brewarrina. Her family were graziers where the death of animals was routine. She completed her schooling at Hornsby Girls' High School in Sydney. Her first degree was in Applied Chemistry and Forensic Science and she went on to a science based doctorate.

In 2005 she was involved in developing a forensic science course at the University of Ontario Institute of Technology. In 2011 she left to take up work in Australia. She became a professor at the University of Sydney.

Up to 2018 she was involved in creating the Australian Facility for Taphonomic Experimental Research (Australia's first body farm) where she was involved with research into decomposing bodies.

In 2018 she became the Canada 150 research chair in thanatology at UQTR. Her seven-year research programme was funded at $350,000 per year and the university met the cost ($350,000) of Canada's first body farm. The nearest similar facility was one at Northern Michigan University, but Forbes was specifically targeting a forest based site. The new body farm is at Bécancour and its correct name is the "Secure Site for Research in Thanatology" (or REST[ES], in French). As of 2023 she left UQTR and is now a full professor in chemistry and biochemistry at the University of Windsor.

Forbes is a fellow of the Royal Society of New South Wales.
