= The Scent of Death =

2019 novel by Simon Beckett

- First edition
- Author: Simon Beckett
- Language: English
- Series: David Hunter
- Release number: 6
- Genre: Crime, Mystery
- Set in: London
- Publisher: Bantam Books
- Publication date: 12 February 2019
- Publication place: United Kingdom
- English publication date: 18 April 2019
- Media type: Hardback book
- Pages: 358
- ISBN: 978-0857504340
- Preceded by: The Restless Dead
- Followed by: The Bone Garden
- Website: Author's webpage

The Scent of Death is the sixth novel by Simon Beckett to feature Dr David Hunter, a forensic anthropologist. It was first published in hardback in the United Kingdom in April 2019. It was published in Germany in February 2019 as Die ewigen Toten (German: The Eternal Dead).

== Background ==
The sixth story in the David Hunter series is the first to be set wholly within London. Previous to this, the settings for the stories have been Norfolk, Devon, the Outer Hebrides, Essex and Tennessee. The author, Simon Beckett, was determined to place Hunter in a more urban environment.

As the David Hunter series is popular in Europe (especially in Germany), Beckett's novels have been published on the continent before his home country of the United Kingdom. The Scent of Death (Die ewigen Toten) was published in February 2019 and went straight to the number one slot on Germany's book chart.

Translation rights have also been granted for the book to be published in Italian, Polish and Russian.

== Plot ==
David Hunter is asked by the police to come to an abandoned and derelict hospital (St Jude's) in London. A mummified corpse has been found in a loft space and Hunter's expertise is brought to bear on the case. After a ceiling collapses, a hidden room is revealed which has a further two bodies in it. After making sure that the building is safe, a cadaver dog is brought in to search for more bodies. Those they have found were put into the room after the hospital was closed and were walled up inside with strange torture and burn marks on their bodies.

As in other cases, Hunter becomes too involved in the people either directly involved with, or on the fringes of the case. One of the people trying to save the hospital is a barrister who asks Hunter for too much information and is killed in a very suspicious hit-and-run which also wounds a fellow forensic officer on the case. Besides all of this, Hunter has to contend with his girlfriend taking a 3-month job abroad and the spectre of Grace Strachan, a female killer from the second book, still causing him to be jittery as she could be back to get him.

== Critical reception ==
Barry Forshaw, writing in the Financial Times, praised the book for its "avoidance of too much extraneous forensic detail," and described Beckett as being "back on form."

Marcel Berlins, writing in The Times, said that the novel was "arguably the best" out of the six written in the series and also described it as "a superbly strong read."
