= Hornsby Girls' High School =

Australian high school

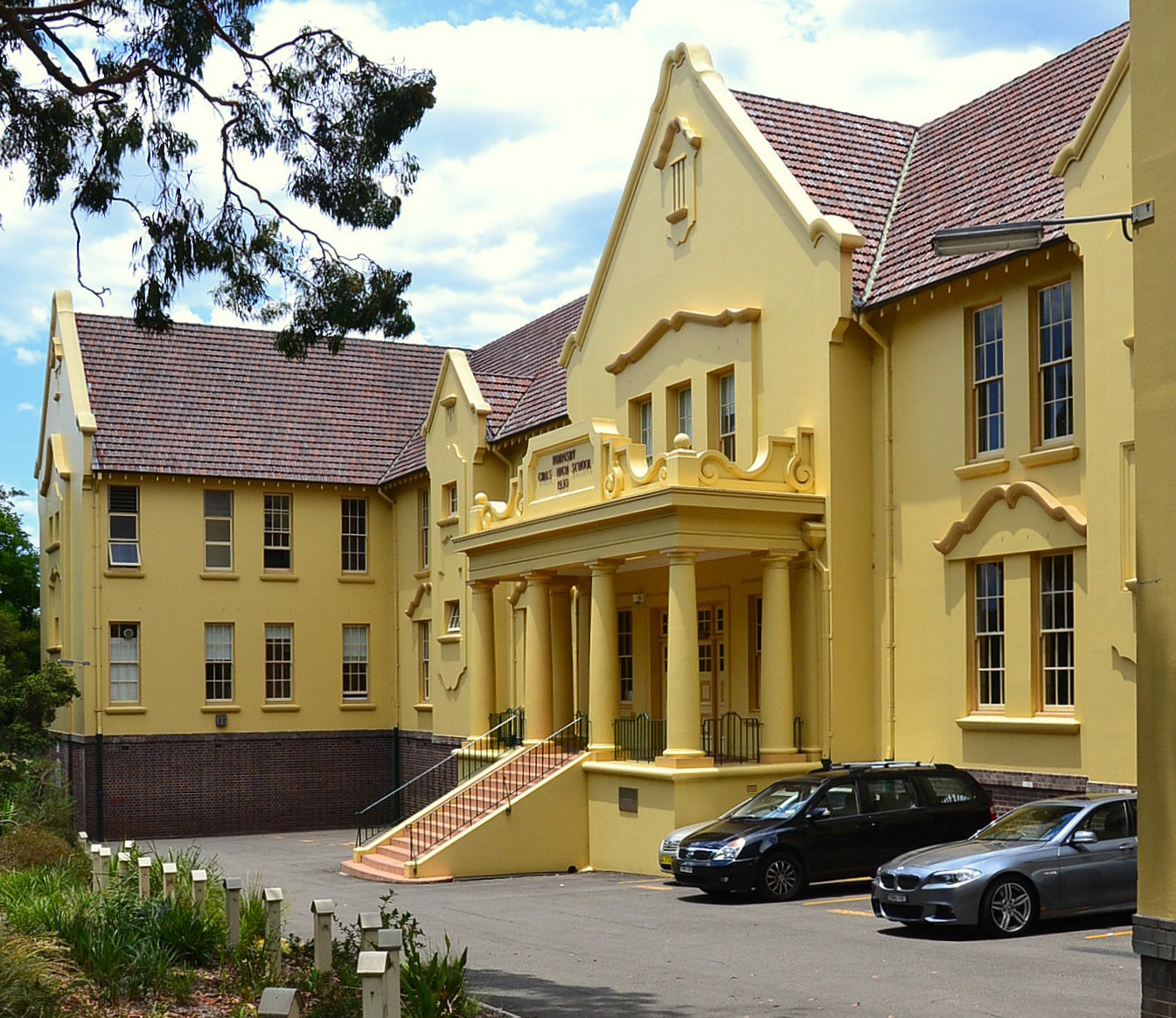
- Hornsby Girls' High School

Location
- Hornsby, Sydney, New South Wales; Australia; 33°42′23″S 151°6′5″E

Information
- Type: Government-funded single-sex selective secondary day school
- Motto: Faith with Fortitude
- Established: 1930
- Principal: Justin Briggs
- Teaching staff: 58 (2025)
- Years offered: 7–12
- Gender: Girls
- Enrolment: 722 (2025)
- Campus: Suburban
- Colours: Fawn and navy blue
- Website: hornsbygir-h.schools.nsw.gov.au

Hornsby Girls' High School is a government-funded single-sex academically selective secondary day school for girls, located in Hornsby, a suburb on the Upper North Shore of Sydney, New South Wales, Australia. Founded in 1930, the school's first principal was the scientist Sarah Agnes Angus Brewster.

Academically, Hornsby Girls' is regularly ranked first in the Hornsby region in terms of Higher School Certificate (HSC) results and is repeatedly ranked as one of the top ten performing schools in the state.

== Faculties ==
The 13 faculties in the school are English, Human Society and Its Environment, languages, mathematics, music, personal development health and physical education (PDHPE), science, technology and applied studies (TAS), and visual arts.

== Co-curriculum ==
Hornsby Girls' offers students the opportunity to participate in a number of musical groups, namely the Concert Band, Symphonic Band, Jazz Band and String Orchestra through their co-curricular music program. Smaller musical outfits are other outlets, such as the several chamber ensembles made up from those students who already play an instrument and wish to be involved in extra-curricular musical groups.

Other musical groups are the Junior and Senior Vocal Ensembles, who participate in a range of competitions, including the MacDonald's Performing Arts Competition and School Spectacular. In 2008, they also appeared in Battle of the Choirs, screened on Channel 7. In 2010, a small chamber vocal ensemble was introduced with the aim of allowing some students a small ensemble experience.

== Notable alumnae ==
The Old Girls' Union was formed in 1930.

- Jen Bartlett, award-winning wildlife photographer
- Anna Booth, trade unionist, company director and Olympic torch carrier
- Anne Boyd AM, composer and academic
- Judith Clingan AM, composer, conductor, performer and music educator
- Christine Elizabeth Deer, Emeritus Professor at the University of Technology, Sydney
- Shari Forbes, forensic scientist and researcher
- Julie Goodwin, cook, author, radio and television presenter
- Julie Kristeen Greenhalgh (née Stapylton), Principal of Meriden School; former Deputy Principal of Pymble Ladies' College; former Head of School at Canberra Grammar School
- Ruth Hall, microbiologist
- Robin June Parsons AM, Emeritus Professor at the University of Technology, Sydney
- Lynette Ramsay Silver AM, writer and historian
- Hon. Justice Sally Thomas AM, Judge of the Supreme Court of the Northern Territory
- Jacki Weaver AO, actor

== See also ==
- List of government schools in New South Wales
- List of selective high schools in New South Wales
