= Freeman Ranch =

Ranch in Texas, United States

Coordinates: 29°56′18″N 98°00′30″W

The Freeman Center is a 3,485-acre (1,410 ha) plot of land between San Marcos and Wimberley, Texas. It was founded in 1941 by weekend ranchers Harold M. "Harry" Freeman and his brother Joe. The Freeman Center houses the Texas State University Forensic Anthropology Center's body farm, where the deceased are used to study the various stages of body decomposition and their effects on the soil.

== History ==
=== Freeman Brothers ===
Harold M. "Harry" Freeman and Joe Freeman, brothers who made their living dealing in oil, cotton, Chevrolet dealerships, and ranchland, bought the land from Mr. E.J. Jameyson in 1941 and continued to add several parcels over the years. The two brothers would utilize the land for weekend getaways which included: hunting, hiking, and iconic poker games. Per perpetual trust, Harold Freeman bequeathed 3,485 acres of ranchland to Texas State University (formerly Southwest Texas State University) for farming, ranching, game management, educational, and experimental purposes. Joe Freeman's land, located adjacent to the university's site, was eventually managed by Frost National Bank.

== Research ==
Researchers conduct experiments and studies at the center, including forensic anthropology.

== Facilities ==
Since 2008, it has been the site of the 26-acre Forensic Anthropology Center at Texas State.
