= Anna Booth =

Fair Work Ombudsman 2023–2028

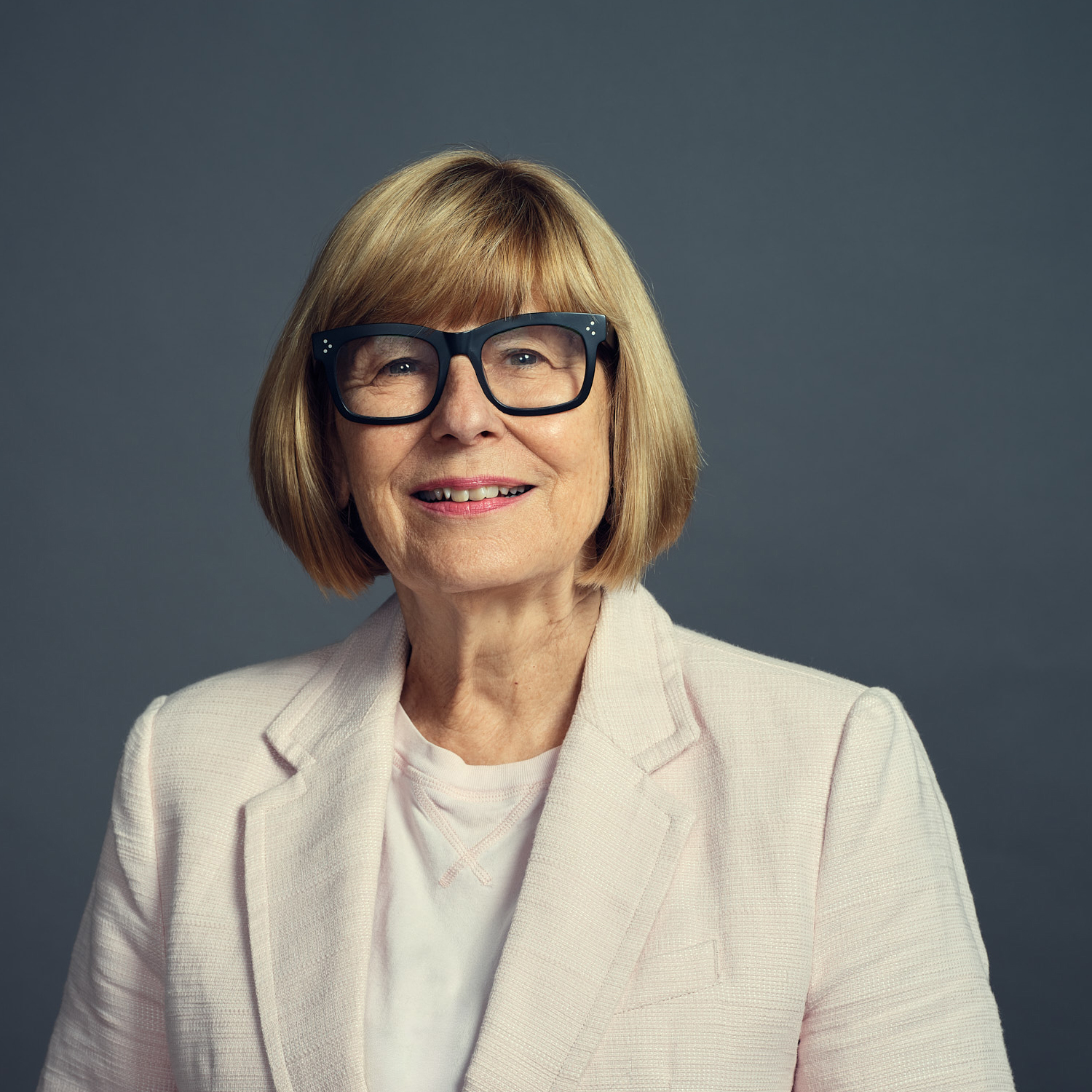

Fair Work Ombudsman
- Incumbent
- Assumed office 1 September 2023
- Minister: Murray Watt; Amanda Rishworth
- Preceded by: Sandra Parker

Deputy President of the Fair Work Commission
- In office 1 March 2012 – 30 June 2020
- President: Iain Ross

Personal details
- Born: 1955 (age 70–71)
- Education: University of Sydney
- Occupation: Trade unionist

Anna Booth (born 1955) is an Australian who became the Fair Work Ombudsman in 2023. She was a successful trade unionist and has served as a company director. She helped to organise the Sydney Olympics torch carriers.

== Life ==
Booth was born in 1955 and she went to school at Hornsby Girls' High School. She graduated in economics from the University of Sydney.

Booth joined the Clothing and Allied Trades Union of Australia as a researcher in 1977 and in 1981 she played a role in establishing an afternoon break for Australian clothing workers. In 1987 she became the union's federal secretary. She was Australia's first female federal (national) union secretary. In 1988 she was an unsuccessful Australian Labor Party candidate for election to parliament in Ku-ring-gai. She became the union's National Secretary and served as a vice-president of the Australian Council of Trade Unions (ACTU). Booth left the union and the ACTU in 1995. She said that she did not want to move cities as was expected and she was frustrated that the merger of her union with the National Union of Workers had been delayed. Her decision changed expectations as it had been thought that she would lead the resulting 150,000 strong union.

She was a member of the Commonwealth Bank's board. The Olympic Games was in Sydney in 2000 and Booth was on the organising Committee. 2,500 people were involved in carrying the torch from Greece to Australia. When the torch began its journey in Australia it was Booth, who had chaired the 2000 Summer Olympics Torch Relay Committee, who brought the torch. She met Governor-General, Sir William Deane, at the sacred spot of Uluru (Ayers Rock) and that began the torch's journey in Australia on 8 June. 11,000 people carried the torch in Australia. Booth later noted that this was the greatest honour of her life. She was added to the Victorian Honour Roll of Women in 2001.

She was deputy president of the Fair Work Commission for eight years from 2012 until 2020. She was then a director of a company until she returned in 2023 to become the ombudsman.
