= Agnes Brewster =

Australian headmistress and naturalist (1874–1957)

Agnes Angus Brewster
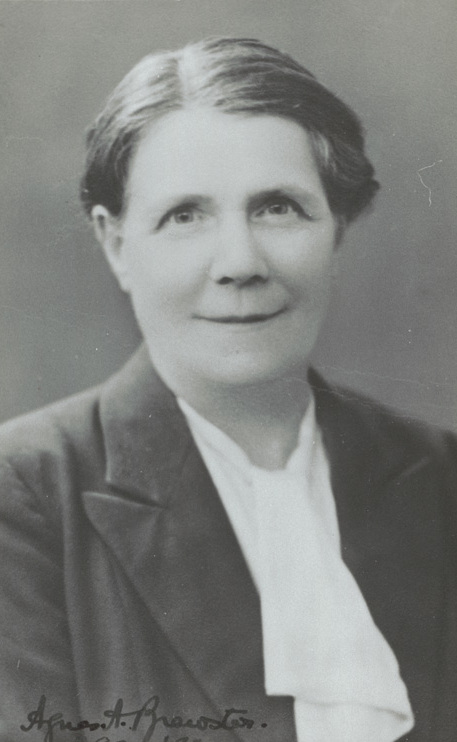
- Born: Sarah Agnes A. Brewster; 29 April 1874; Sydney, New South Wales, Australia
- Died: 29 December 1957 (aged 83); Royal North Shore Hospital, St Leonards, New South Wales, Australia
- Known for: headmistress and naturalist

Sarah Agnes Angus Brewster or Agnes Angus Brewster (29 April 1874 – 29 December 1957) was an Australian headmistress and naturalist. She was the founding head of Sydney's Hornsby Girls' High School.

== Life ==
Brewster was born in Sydney in 1874. Her English-born mother, Sarah (born Morton) gave birth to her in Belmore Barracks. Her Scottish-born father William Brewster was an armourer and they already had nine children when she was born. The family was said to date back to 1561 when Elizabeth the first had granted a coat of arms.

Brewster was a pupil-teacher and in 1893 she became a qualified teacher. She went to teacher training college and she became a demonstrator of science at Sydney Technical College. In 1921 Brewster was one of the first two women who they made a fellow at Sydney Technical College.

In 1916 she and Constance M. Le Plastrier published Botany for Australian students. Brewster was the illustrator of the book. The book was said to be "the best work to date on Australian botany".

She became the founding head of Hornsby Girls' High School in (one source says) 1931 (although a plaque at the school gives the date as 4 December 1930). During her seven years at the school she established plants into a designed garden, she put books in the library and pictures in the corridors. Courts were built so that the girls could play basketball and tennis. She retired on 31 January 1938 and she took a renewed interest in science.

== Death and legacy ==
Brewster died in Sydney's Royal North Shore Hospital in 1957 and in October 1958 a library was proposed and a public appeal launched. In May 1965 the Head Deaconess of Hornsby School dedicated the Agnes Brewster Memorial Library to her.
