= Jennifer Mary DeBruyn =

American researcher

Jennifer DeBruyn
- Education: The University of Tennessee - Knoxville
- Scientific career
- Thesis: Distribution and dynamics of pyrene-degrading Mycobacteria in freshwater sediments contaminated with polycyclic aromatic hydrocarbons
- Doctoral advisor: Gary S Sayler

Jennifer DeBruyn is a professor in Biosystems Engineering and Soil Sciences at the University of Tennessee. She is known for her work on biodegradation of agricultural plastics and vertebrate animals (including humans) in natural systems.

== Education and career ==
DeBruyn received her bachelor's degree from Queens University in Kingston, ON, Canada. She completed her doctoral studies in Ecology & Evolutionary Biology at the University of Tennessee. DeBruyn was a postdoctoral researcher at the University of Tennessee Institute of Agriculture before joining the Biosystems Engineering & Soil Sciences Department. She is presently a Full Professor.

== Research ==
DeBruyn's research focuses on microbial degradation of complex materials. Her doctoral work focused on the degradation of contaminants, using the Chattanooga Creek superfund site and Lake Erie as field models. As a faculty member she established research at UTK's "body farm" to begin to tease apart the role of microbes in cadaver degradation. She is also known for her work the UT Extension, including her contributions to their Backyard STEM outreach program.

== Outreach work ==
DeBruyn has worked to help develop the "Backyard Stem for Tennessee" educational program as part of her appointment with UTK extension. Backyard Stem is a series of state sponsored modules offered through Tennessee 4-H to expose school age children to environmental sciences outside the classroom.

== Selected publications ==
- Bandopadhyay S, L Martin-Closas, AM Pelacho, JM DeBruyn. (2018). Biodegradable plastic mulch films: impacts on soil microbial communities and ecosystem functions. Frontiers in Microbiology 9, 349830 doi: 10.3389/fmicb.2018.00819
- Cobaugh KL, SM Schaeffer, JM DeBruyn (2015) Functional and structural succession of soil microbial communities below decomposing human cadavers PloS ONE 10 (6), e0130201 doi:10.1371/journal.pone.0130201
- DeBruyn JM, LT Nixon, MN Fawaz, AM Johnson, M Radosevich (2011) Global biogeography and quantitative seasonal dynamics of Gemmatimonadetes in soil. Applied and Environmental Microbiology 77 (17), 6295-6300 doi:10.1128/AEM.05005-11

== Awards, honors and recognition ==
DeBruyn is often sought by the popular press for her work. She has contributed and been interviewed for articles in outlets including the BBC, NPR, Discover Magazine, CNN, Popular Mechanics, and CBCs "Quirks and Quarks"

DeBruyn has been recognized by UTIA with the Mid-Career Award for Faculty Excellence.

In 2026, DeBruyn was named a fellow of the American Association for the Advancement of Science (AAAS).

== Personal life ==
DeBruyn is a nationally ranked adventure racer with the No Complaints adventure racing team.
