= Whispers of the Dead =

2009 novel by Simon Beckett

- First edition
- Author: Simon Beckett
- Language: English
- Series: David Hunter
- Release number: Three
- Genre: Crime, Mystery
- Set in: Tennessee
- Publisher: Bantam Press
- Publication date: 2009
- Publication place: United Kingdom
- Media type: Print
- Pages: 317
- ISBN: 978-0-593-05526-7
- Preceded by: Written in Bone
- Followed by: The Calling of the Grave

Whispers of the Dead is the third novel in the Dr David Hunter series, created by Simon Beckett. It was published in January 2009 by Bantam Press.

== Plot ==
Dr David Hunter returns to 'The Body Farm' in Tennessee where he learned the ins and outs of forensic anthropology. He has gone to America to try and see if he can still do the job he has become accustomed to after surviving the attempt on his life by Grace Strachan, the murderer from the previous book, Written in Bone.

Whilst in Tennessee, a body is found in a remote cabin in the woods and David's old instructor asks him to tag along for a fresh pair of eyes at the crime scene. A fingerprint at the crime scene leads them to a man who had died six months earlier and whose own body has been replaced in his grave by that of someone far older than he was. It becomes clear that they are dealing with someone who has the same intricate and detailed forensic knowledge that they have and that a serial killer is on the loose.
