= Jon Jefferson =

American writer

- Born: November 13, 1955 (age 70); St. Joseph, Missouri, U.S.
- Education: Birmingham–Southern College; University of North Carolina at Chapel Hill
- Occupation: Author
- Writing career
- Pen name: Jefferson Bass
- Website: www.jeffersonbass.com

Jon Jefferson (born November 13, 1955) is a contemporary American author and television documentary maker. Jefferson has written ten novels in the Body Farm series under the pen name Jefferson Bass, in consultation with William M. Bass, a renowned forensic anthropologist, as well as two non-fiction books about Bass's life and forensic cases.

== Life ==
Born in St. Joseph, Missouri, Jefferson spent most of his youth in Guntersville, Alabama. As a high school senior, he was named a National Merit Scholar, a state winner in the National Council of Teachers of English writing contest, and a Presidential Scholar (one of two from Alabama). He won a scholarship to Birmingham-Southern College, where he majored in English, graduating summa cum laude and Phi Beta Kappa. He did graduate study in English and comparative literature at the University of North Carolina at Chapel Hill.

Prior to writing books, Jefferson worked as a staff science writer at Oak Ridge National Laboratory; as an educator and administrator at Planned Parenthood of East Tennessee; as a freelance magazine and newspaper journalist; and as a television documentary writer/producer. His writings have been published in The New York Times, Newsweek, USA Today and Popular Science, and have been broadcast on NPR. His documentaries include programs for the A&E Network, The History Channel, and the Oxygen Network. He also wrote and directed for the National Geographic Channel a two-part documentary — Biography of a Corpse and Anatomy of a Corpse — about the University of Tennessee Anthropological Research Facility, which is also widely known as the Body Farm. During filming, Jefferson met the founder of the Body Farm, Bill Bass, who asked for Jefferson's assistance to write his memoir, which was published in 2003 under the title Death's Acre.

Since 2015, Jefferson and his wife have lived in Athens, Georgia.

== Jefferson Bass ==
The success of the memoir Death's Acre inspired Jon Jefferson to create a series of collaborative crime-fiction novels with Bass using the pen name Jefferson Bass. In 2006, the pair published a debut novel, Carved in Bone, which reached # 25 on The New York Times Best Seller list. Every year thereafter, Jefferson Bass published another novel in the Body Farm series, including: Flesh and Bone, The Devil's Bones, Bones of Betrayal, The Bone Thief, The Bone Yard, The Inquisitor's Key and Cut to the Bone. Based on accurate forensic science, the Body Farm series has helped to increase popular interest in forensic criminal investigations involving the remains of the human body. Jefferson's second nonfiction collaboration with Bass, Beyond the Body Farm, recounts additional cases Bass worked, including the deadly 1983 Benton fireworks disaster.

== Solo Fiction ==
Jefferson is also the author of the 2018 standalone novel Wave of Terror, a thriller in which terrorists attempt to weaponize a large geologic fault in the Canary Islands. By triggering a massive landslide on the island of La Palma, they hope to unleash an immense tsunami, powerful enough to devastate the entire eastern seaboard of the United States.
