= William M. Bass =

American forensic anthropologist

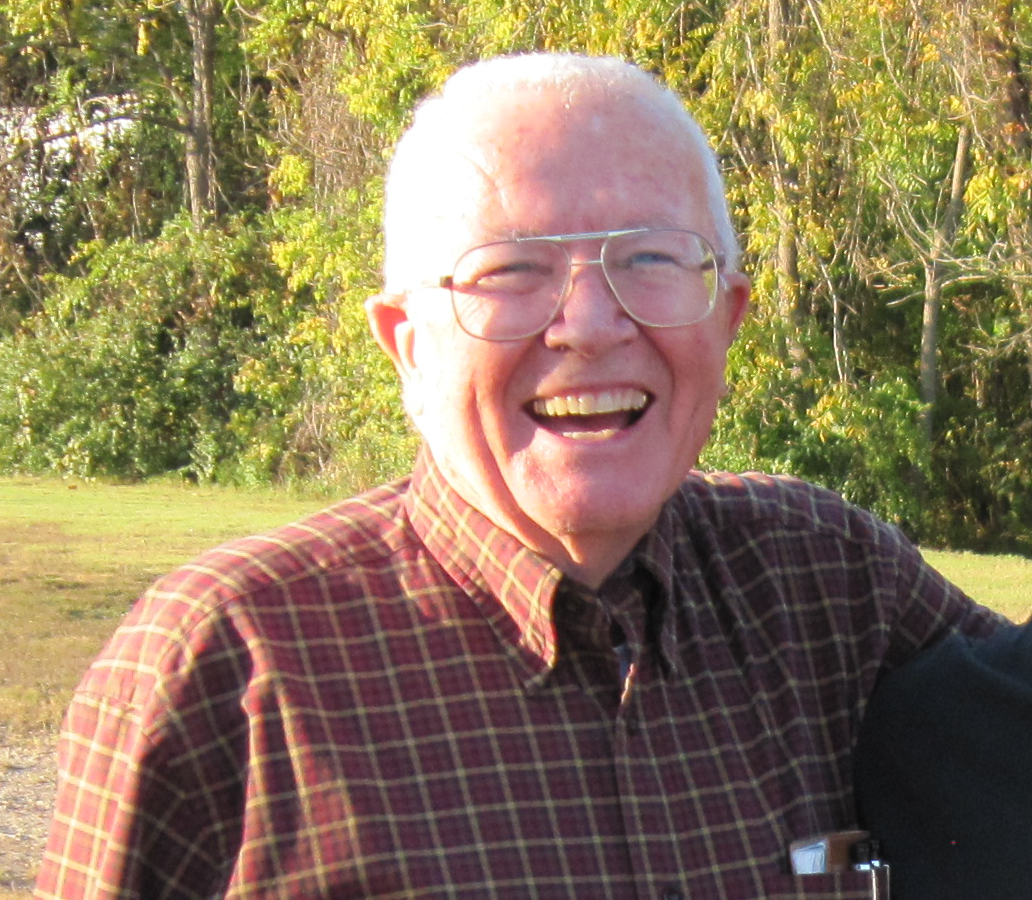
- Bass in 2011
- Born: August 30, 1928 (age 98); Staunton, Virginia, U.S.
- Education: University of Virginia (B.A.); University of Kentucky (M.Sc.); University of Pennsylvania (Ph.D.)
- Occupation: Forensic anthropologist
- Known for: Research on human decomposition and osteology Founder of the body farm at the University of Tennessee Anthropological Research Facility

William Marvin Bass III (born August 30, 1928) is an American forensic anthropologist, best known for his research on human osteology and human decomposition. He has also assisted federal, local, and non-U.S. authorities in the identification of human remains. He taught at the University of Tennessee in Knoxville, and founded the University of Tennessee Anthropological Research Facility, the first such facility in the world. The facility is more popularly known as "The Body Farm", a name used by crime author Patricia Cornwell in a novel of the same name, which drew inspiration from Bass and his work. Bass has also described the body farm as "Death's Acre" – the title of the book on his life and career, co-written with journalist Jon Jefferson. Jefferson and Bass, under the pen name "Jefferson Bass", have also written several fictional works: Carved In Bone, Flesh and Bone, The Devil's Bones, Bones of Betrayal, The Bone Thief, The Bone Yard, The Inquisitor's Key, Cut To the Bone, and The Breaking Point. Though currently retired from teaching, Bass still plays an active research role in the university's forensic anthropology program.

== Biography ==
Bass was born in Staunton, Virginia to Marvin and Jenny Bass. His father was a manager of gold mines and limestone quarries. His mother received a degree in home economics in 1925.

Bass attended Hampden-Sydney College before transferring his junior year to the University of Virginia for his undergraduate degree in psychology, which he received in 1951, and was a scholar at the US Army Medical Research Laboratory from 1953 to 1954, where he studied psychophysiology. He received his master's from the University of Kentucky in 1956. He completed his Ph.D. in anthropology from the University of Pennsylvania in 1961. His research career began as an archaeologist, excavating Native American grave sites in the Midwestern United States during the latter 1950s and 1960s. He mentions in Death's Acre that this activity earned him the informal title "Indian grave-robber number one" from an Indian activist, though no clashes with Native Americans ever occurred. He worked briefly at the universities of Kansas and Nebraska during this time. He was hired by the University of Tennessee in 1971 to head their anthropology department, which was in the process of being split from the history department at the time.

Bass first got the idea for what would eventually become the body farm while he was at the University of Kansas in the 1960s, and was asked if it was possible to determine the time of death of a partially decomposed cow. He determined that additional research was needed for this, and suggested that this could be accomplished by allowing a deceased cow to decompose in a field while studying the process. While this experiment was never conducted, Bass further realized that additional research on human decomposition was needed after he was summoned in December 1977 to examine what was initially assumed to be a recent murder victim that had been buried on top of the grave of a Confederate soldier in Franklin, Tennessee who had been killed at the Battle of Nashville in 1864. Due to the fact that the body was relatively intact and still contained most of its flesh, he initially estimated that the body had been dead for less than a year, but examination of the victim's clothing determined that the body was that of the soldier buried in the grave. Grave robbers had punctured the cast iron coffin, which was airtight and largely prevented decomposition, removed the body, and then reburied it on top of the coffin. He started the university's anthropological research facility in 1980, which was the first in the world. He established the university's Forensic Anthropology Center in 1987.

Most of Bass' research has been on osteology and human decomposition. Bass' research, along with his graduate students, has made many advances in how to determine the cause and time of death of a person and the conditions in which death took place. His research has formed the basis of techniques used by medical examiners, forensic pathologists, homicide detectives, and other law enforcement personnel in postmortem investigations. Later, Bass began researching cremation.

In addition to his research, Bass has also assisted law enforcement in forensic investigations. He has investigated multiple high-profile cases, including the 1983 Benton fireworks disaster, the Tri-State Crematory scandal, and the 2007 exhumation and autopsy of The Big Bopper, in which he determined the cause of death, which had not been confirmed initially.

Bass is the third generation in his family to have an educational building named after him. The William M. Bass III Forensic Anthropology Building dedication ceremony was September 27, 2011, near the Body Farm.

== Personal life ==
Bass has been married three times. He married his first wife, Mary Anna Owens, whom he met while doing research for the Army, in 1953. Owens died of colon cancer in 1993. His second marriage, in 1994, was to Annette Blackbourne, who died in 1997 from lung cancer. Later that year he married Carol Lee Hicks, who had been a friend of his since childhood. Bass has three sons, Charlie, William Marvin IV, and Jim. Bass was a devout Christian for much of his adult life, but now he is an atheist.
