= The Chemistry of Death =

2006 novel by Simon Beckett

- First edition
- Author: Simon Beckett
- Language: English
- Series: David Hunter Series
- Genre: Crime, Mystery
- Publisher: Bantam Books
- Publication date: 2006
- Publication place: United Kingdom
- Media type: Print
- Pages: 336 (2006 edition)
- ISBN: 978-0-593-05521-2
- OCLC: 62475531
- Followed by: Written in Bone

The Chemistry of Death is a novel by the British crime fiction writer Simon Beckett, first published in 2006. The novel introduced the character of Dr David Hunter, who has gone on to feature in other novels by the writer. The Chemistry of Death was nominated for the Duncan Lawrie Dagger by the Crime Writers' Association in 2006.

The book was adapted into a six-part television series The Chemistry of Death, streaming on Paramount+ in the UK on 19 January 2023.

== Plot ==
Forensics expert David Hunter is recovering from a shattering tragedy three years earlier. While he is working in an isolated Norfolk village as a doctor, a woman's mutilated corpse is discovered. Police want to exploit Hunter's forensic knowledge to help identify the killer, but he is wary of involvement. Another woman disappears and the small community in which Hunter has taken refuge is divided by suspicion, including suspicion of Hunter himself.
