= University of Tennessee Anthropological Research Facility =

Anthropological research facility in Knoxville, Tennessee, US

- Established: 1972 (54 years ago)
- Parent institution: Forensic Anthropology Center
- Affiliations: University of Tennessee
- Director: Dr. Dawnie Wolfe Steadman, DABFA
- Location: Knoxville, Tennessee, United States
- Website: fac.utk.edu

The University of Tennessee Anthropological Research Facility, better known as the Body Farm and sometimes seen as the Forensic Anthropology Facility, was conceived in 1971 and established in 1972 by anthropologist William M. Bass as the first facility for the study of decomposition of human remains. It is located a few miles from downtown Knoxville, Tennessee, United States, behind the University of Tennessee Medical Center, and is part of the Forensic Anthropology Center, which was established by Dr. Bass in 1987.

It consists of a 2.5-acre (10,000 m^{2}) wooded plot, surrounded by a razor wire fence. Bodies are placed in different settings throughout the facility and left to decompose. The bodies are exposed in a number of ways in order to provide insights into decomposition under varying conditions. The facility has expanded from just 20 exposed bodies in 2003 to around 150 in 2007.

== History ==
=== Origins ===
The Anthropological Research Facility, the first body farm created, was founded by Bass to generate information about what a corpse experiences when exposed to various experimental conditions. On this farm, human corpses yield to the elements of nature in many re-enacted scenes such as a car accident unseen for days, or a murder victim buried in a shallow grave. Prior to the creation of this institution, no advances had been made in the study of long-term body decomposition since the days of Song Ci in 13th century China. Many advances have been made about how to determine postmortem interval due to the Body Farm.

In 1966, while teaching at the University of Kansas, Dr. Bass got the first idea for what would eventually become the Body Farm when he was asked if it was possible to determine the time of death of a decomposed cow. He determined that additional research was needed to accomplish this, and suggested that such knowledge could be determined by allowing a deceased cow to decompose in a field and observing the process. Bass further realized that additional research was needed into the field of human decomposition when he was summoned in December of 1977 to examine what was first assumed to be a murder victim buried on top of the grave of a Confederate soldier in Franklin, Tennessee who had been killed at the Battle of Nashville in 1864. As the body was relatively intact and still contained most of its flesh, Dr. Bass initially estimated that the body had been dead for less than one year, but examination of the clothing determined that the body was actually that of the soldier buried in the grave. It was determined that grave robbers had recently punctured the soldier's coffin, which was made of cast iron and sealed airtight, which largely prevented decomposition, and removed the body, before reburying it on top of the coffin.

During the 1970s, donated and unclaimed bodies were macerated at an abandoned farm owned by the university. By the early 1980s when the "body farm" began, Bass had been in the position of head of the anthropology department at the University of Tennessee for a little over a decade, and had been appointed as the first state forensic anthropologist of Tennessee. As the state's forensic anthropologist, Bass was the official called on to determine cause and time of death.

=== Early experiences ===
In the fall of 1980, Bass began building his facility with a small group of students. His initial institution consisted of a fenced-off, 256-square-foot (23.8 m^{2}) slab of concrete with a small, windowless shed on top, where tools and surgical instruments would be stored. A front porch measuring 160 square feet (15 m^{2}) was reserved as a spot to lay bodies out for decomposition studies. On May 15, 1981, the facility received its first donated research subject: a 73-year-old man who had died of emphysema and heart disease. Labeled "1-81" for confidentiality, Bass' first research subject provided information on the four stages that occur during the decomposition of a human body. Bass uses this naming convention, the designated number of the body and the year it was obtained, specifically for donated research subjects. Bass uses the reverse convention, "year-number", for the real world cases he works.

Bill Rodriguez, one of Bass' graduate students, wrote his doctoral thesis on information gathered from this facility. During the facility's first year of operation, Rodriguez conducted a study where each day he observed and notated the presence of various insects on human cadavers and other information like changes in the body, and the timing of each of these. Rodriguez noticed that blow-flies immediately swarmed a carcass in study and began mass-producing eggs all over its orifices. However, other insects were also attracted to the freshly rotting body including yellow jackets and wasps. Once the blow-fly eggs turned into maggots, beetles too began assembling on the body not only to feed on the body itself but on its co-inhabitants, the maggots, as well. In addition, the four stages of decomposition were systemically characterized in a scientific, orderly manner beginning with "1-81". During the fresh stage, maggots fed and multiplied on the corpse. The skin of the upper jaw and mandible stretch into what looks like a smile, and the hair and skin are still securely attached to the skull. After a couple days, the body enters the bloat stage, which is caused by the gases that the bacteria in the intestines give off as they feed on the dead tissues. Next, the body slowly decomposes in the decay stage until it finally reaches the dry stage in which the body has basically become a skeleton. About a month passed before "1-81" entered the dry stage. Microbes and insects had consumed most of his soft tissues, and the sun had dried out what was left on the bones.

=== Present ===
Video of a Body Farm-hosted course for FBI evidence response team (ERT) to training in forensic anthropology techniques for use at crime scenes.

As of November 2023, the Body Farm covers 2.5 acres (10,000 m^{2}) of land and is surrounded by razor-wire and fences. Instead of just one body, approximately forty bodies are studied at the same time in different scenarios. The information gathered by studying how the body decomposes because of digestive enzymes, bacteria, and insects is most often used to determine the postmortem interval. Knowing the length of time that has passed since death helps a great deal when attempting to reconcile the information gathered at the crime scene with alibis given by possible suspects. Thus this information is often a critical detail and may be used to invalidate a false alibi and lead to a conviction.

Since 2000, the Federal Bureau of Investigation has sent evidence response team agents to a facility course to gain training in clandestine-grave discovery and excavation.

== Selected cases ==
=== Arson and entomology ===
William Bass and his students did not isolate themselves through their own studies at the Body Farm; they also received forensic cases from law enforcement in which they could lend their expertise. One situation, case "91-23", involved arson upon a car on the border of Tennessee. After using other various forensics on the body including bone examinations, Bass and his team were able to identify the victim. The only other question was how long ago the victim had died; with this, they turned toward entomology, and more specifically, the life cycle of flies. Two of Bass' graduate students collected maggots and puparia on the scene and took them back to the Body Farm to study and after procedural observation and testing, the puparia appeared to be "charred" from the same fire that brought an end to the car and the body. This observation gave significant evidence that the man had been dead in his car for almost an entire life cycle of a blow-fly (approximately two weeks) before fire was even set to it. Because of this, Bass and his team were able to determine a more accurate time of death, which helped place authorities in the right direction in search of the murderer(s).

=== Proving innocence ===
In another case in 1981, a man named Alan Gell was granted an appeal to his earlier conviction for the murder of another man, Allen Ray Jenkins. Gell's attorney, Mary Pollard, needed assistance finding the postmortem interval on the victim in order to clear her client. With this, she turned to Murray Marks, one of the forensic anthropologists who worked at the Body Farm under Bass. Marks, a specialist in corpse decomposition, used a measurement known as "degree days", which utilizes daily temperature, along with crime scene photos of the maggots in order to determine an accurate range of dates for possible death. This information placed the time of death in such a range that it was impossible for Gell to be the true murderer of Jenkins.

=== "The Big Bopper" ===
A more recent case came to light in 2007 with Bass' agreement to exhume the body of the late J.P. Richardson, Jr, more famously known as "The Big Bopper". He was one of the three musicians that died in a plane crash in February 1959. His son, Jay Richardson, had never met his father and, knowing the strange controversies surrounding the plane crash, decided to contact Bass to see if he could gather any answers. Questions lingered as to whether or not Buddy Holly's gun found at the scene of the crash had been fired earlier or if Richardson had managed to survive the initial crash and simply died trying to get away. After exhumation of the body, Bass examined it using a portable X-ray system. After X-ray examination, Bass was able to come to a fairly certain conclusion: Richardson died immediately upon impact. He showed Jay Richardson the numerous breaks and fractures throughout his father's body, including his chest, skull, pelvis, and legs which inhibited ambulatory motion. All of the rumors and debates surrounding Richardson's death could finally be put to rest, and it was due largely in part to Bass and his extensive knowledge of forensic anthropology.

== Program advocates ==
The collaboration of William M. Bass and Jon Jefferson began in Tennessee, but has spread across international boundaries. Their association, studies, and publications have led to many journalistic accomplishments, including some which have listed the authors under the pseudonym Jefferson Bass. This union of their names as one signifies the strength of their partnership. Bass's establishment of the Body Farm and the published studies and results have led to new understandings of the breakdown of the human body. These studies have enriched the knowledge of the decomposition of the body and the effects of the environment, which has led to enhanced use of forensic science in criminal investigations.

== Progression and future ==
As Body Farm research continues to evolve, the researchers at the Anthropological Research Facility continue to identify new methods to calculate the postmortem interval, body identification, and any other variables that might aid criminal investigations. Time of death in a homicide case can make the difference between bringing criminals to justice and a cold case. Therefore, this has been the main focus of the Body Farm since it was opened. With the progression of research, Bass is hopeful that in the future, entomologists will be able to declare time of death within a half-day. What makes this a difficult task to accomplish is that every minute that passes after death, the range of time they can correctly estimate time of death is broadened dramatically. The Body Farm's success over the past 36 years is directly responsible for a vast amount of the overwhelming progress in narrowing that range. When asked about the growth of the Body Farm in the future, Bass insinuated that the Body Farm is too small right now and a higher percentage of land area that has not been contaminated by other burials is needed for future achievements. Bass has proposed the need for more territory to the University of Tennessee, and the university has granted the ARF at least 12 acres (49,000 m^{2}) in addition the original 2.5-acre (10,000 m^{2}) lot.

=== Mainstream applications ===
Television shows have and continue to aid the success and public opinion of the Body Farm. Before programs like CSI: Crime Scene Investigation, there was a great deal of protest and controversy that surrounded the Body Farm mainly because people thought it was grotesque, barbaric and an insult to the deceased, to let their bodies decompose for unnecessary scientific reasons. CSI, accompanied by scientific advances, has helped the public come to terms with this research. As a result, an increased number of citizens are willing to donate their bodies after passing to aid this research.

=== Recent advancements ===
Identifying skeletal remains is a very sensitive research subject at the farm. With a new age and generation, there has been a paradigm shift in methods to identify the entrails of victims. With innovations and adaptation to change, computers are able to identify properties of bone matter that has been buried years beginning at the Forensic Anthropology Data Bank founded in 1986 at the University of Texas, which houses thousands of detailed measurements of skeletons. This data provides strong evidence that shows differences in ethnic background from ancient times to present today. Along with the data bank, technological innovations have given researchers a computer tool called FORDISC. This program is used to evaluate subtleties in a bone sample on a much smaller scale, which can confirm or challenge theories and/or conclusions drawn by investigators.

=== Future studies ===
Body Farm staff is also studying the compounds released by corpses after burial. If a person is reported missing, the authorities search for the missing entities using K-9 units, but they do not know what specifically activates what the K-9 smell for. Research has confirmed that dead bodies give off more than 400 compounds. Due to the success of this research, they can recreate these smells and train dogs on what exactly to search for, making these animals much more effective in aiding with homicide cases.

=== Body donation ===
Donating a person's body after death will ensure that research can continue, and thirty to fifty bodies are donated each year. However, a body donation policy has been established that sets certain guidelines. For example, once a body has been donated, the remains will not be returned to the family as the skeleton will be placed into the program's donated skeletal collection. Bodies which were infected by diseases such as HIV and MRSA may only be donated if first cremated, which is still considered useful for research. Pre-donation paperwork must also be completed prior to a body being transported to the facility.
