= Sailor sandwich =

Sandwich with hot meat and cheese

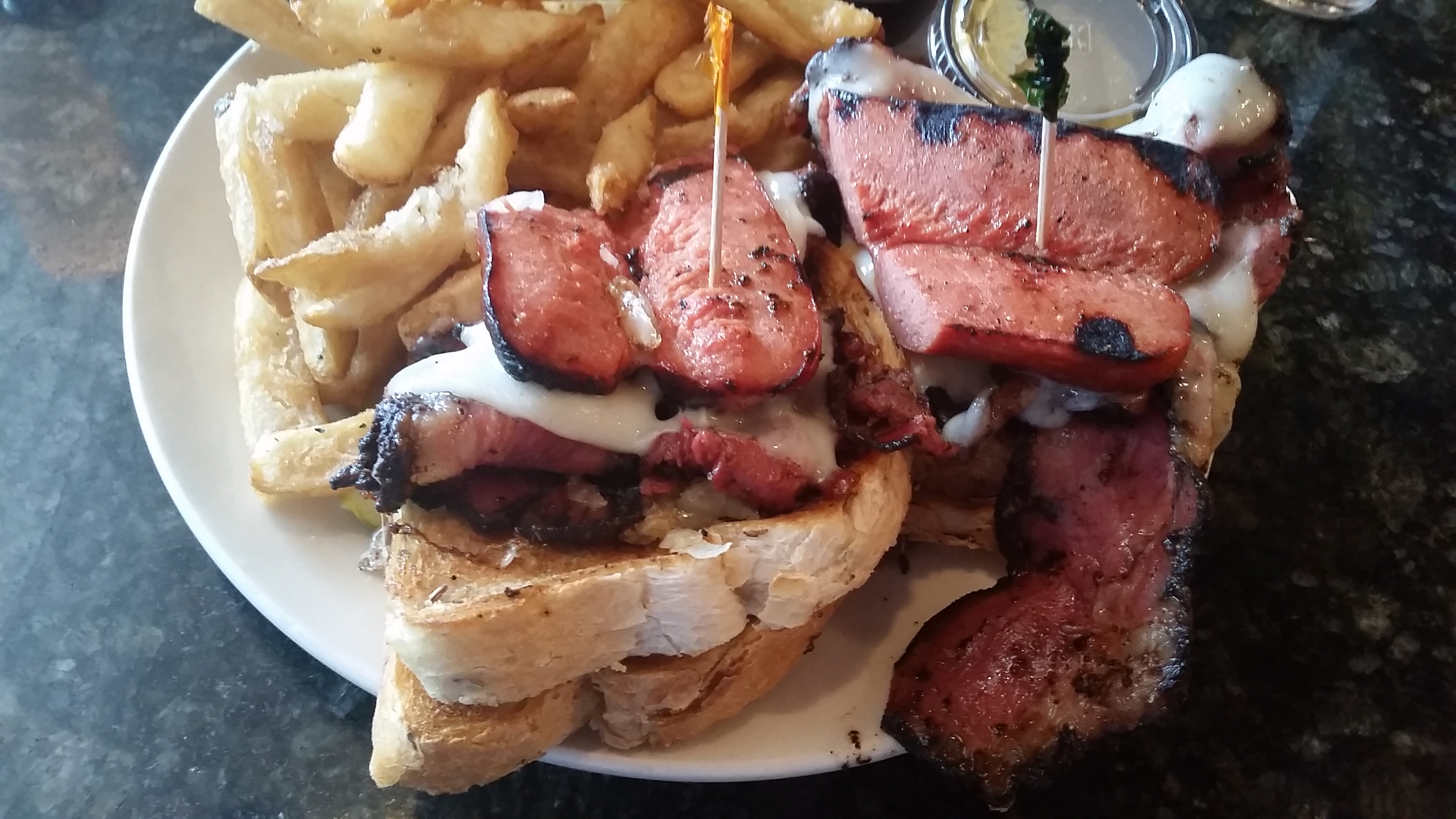
- A sailor sandwich, as served at Richmond's New York Deli
- Type: Jewish deli Sandwich
- Place of origin: United States
- Region or state: Virginia
- Created by: New York Deli, Richmond, Virginia
- Main ingredients: Pastrami, knackwurst, Swiss cheese, hot mustard, rye bread

A sailor sandwich is a hot meat and cheese sandwich popular at Jewish delis in the Richmond, Virginia, area. Its core ingredients are hot pastrami, grilled knackwurst, melted Swiss cheese and hot mustard on rye bread.

== Origins ==
The New York Deli, a Jewish deli founded in 1929, claims to be the originator of the sailor sandwich. According to local legend, during World War II, Navy seamen from the University of Richmond Navy V-12 program would frequent the New York Deli and order this then-nameless sandwich. It eventually became known as a sailor sandwich, although it is uncertain who officially named the dish.

== Variations ==
The marine sandwich is popular around some Marine bases like MCB Quantico. It is usually served on Italian bread with knackwurst, pastrami or salami and uses Jewish-style mustard and comes with peppers. The West Coast version often includes sliced tomatoes on the side.

== In popular culture ==
- Patricia Cornwell, whose Kay Scarpetta novels often take place in the Richmond area, include characters ordering and eating sailor sandwiches in Cause of Death and Cruel and Unusual.
- In Guy Fieri's book, Diners, Drive-ins and Dives: An All-American Road Trip, the chapter on Virginia features Dot's Back Inn in Richmond as a place to get a sailor sandwich. Dot's Back Inn and the sailor sandwich were featured in an episode of Diners, Drive-Ins and Dives filmed in 2007.

== See also ==
- List of American sandwiches
- List of sandwiches
