= Joel Schumacher's unrealized projects =

During his long career, film director Joel Schumacher (1939–2020) had worked on several projects which never progressed beyond the pre-production stage under his direction. Some of these projects fell in development hell, were officially canceled, were in development limbo or would see life under a different production team.

== 1970s ==
=== A Chorus Line ===
In mid-1979, Schumacher was hired by Universal Pictures to write and direct A Chorus Line, after having just completed his first feature, The Incredible Shrinking Woman. To market the film, Universal enlisted producer Allan Carr, who hired Marvin Hamlisch to write several new songs for the film and asked John Travolta to play the character Zack. Creative differences with Carr soon arose when Schumacher wanted the film to feature extensive flashbacks of the dancers as children, to dramatize the moment when they heard the call of the stage. In early 1980, Universal sold the rights to A Chorus Line to PolyGram Pictures, and the film was made by Richard Attenborough.

== 1990s ==
=== And the Band Played On ===
On October 1, 1991, the Los Angeles Times reported that Schumacher would no longer be directing the TV docudrama And the Band Played On, which was adapted from Randy Shilts's 1987 novel. Roger Spottiswoode took his place and the film aired in 1993.

=== The Crowded Room ===
On November 5, 1995, Schumacher was hired to direct the movie adaptation of Daniel Keyes's novel The Minds of Billy Milligan entitled The Crowded Room. Eventually Schumacher left the project due to his commitment to Batman & Robin. On October 13, 2004, Schumacher was again attached as director of the project but soon left. An anthology television series of the novel aired on Apple TV+ in 2023, written by Akiva Goldsman who had written both Batman Forever and Batman & Robin for Schumacher.

=== The Runaway Jury ===
In 1996, Schumacher was set to direct the film adaptation of John Grisham's novel The Runaway Jury, which was expected to enter production in October the following year with a cast of Sean Connery, Gwyneth Paltrow and Edward Norton. However, by July 1997, Schumacher dropped out of the project. According to Variety, the film stalled due to the fact that it "hinged on a landmark tobacco lawsuit that wasn't timely after tobacco lawsuit losses" and was being reworked to focus on gun manufacturing instead. Philip Kaufman and Alfonso Cuarón both signed on in his place at different times. Gary Fleder instead stepped in and the film was released as Runaway Jury in 2003.

=== Gossip ===
On January 9, 1997, it was revealed that Schumacher was stepping down as director of the psychological thriller film Gossip for Warner Bros., opting instead to executive produce.

=== Popcorn ===
In place of Gossip, Schumacher signed on to direct an adaptation of Ben Elton's novel Popcorn for Warner Bros., with Elton writing the script. The film was expected to go forward later in September that year, following Schumacher's promotional obligations for Batman & Robin.

=== The Apartment remake ===
On February 24, 1999, Schumacher was hired to direct the remake of Gilles Mimouni's 1996 French thriller film The Apartment for Paramount Pictures and Lakeshore Entertainment. By August 1999, Brendan Fraser and Kate Winslet were lined up to star, but their asking price would have brought the budget of the film from $30 million to $50 million and over. Lakeshore and Schumacher hoped to cast Freddie Prinze Jr. in place of Fraser and to keep Winslet at a more modest fee, but these plans did not come to pass. Instead, Schumacher left the project, which became Wicker Park, directed by Paul McGuigan.

=== Church of the Dead Girls ===
On April 14, 1999, it was reported that Schumacher had been attached to direct an adaptation of Stephen Dobyns' Church of the Dead Girls for Good Machine and Universal Pictures, with Doug Wright writing the script. The horror novel is set in a small town in which a seemingly random disappearance of three local teenagers takes place.

== 2000s ==
=== Dare ===
While completing post-production on Tigerland and Phone Booth in summer 2000, Schumacher had committed to directing Dare, an Americanized dramatic version of the 1996 BBC thriller Truth or Dare. The project was set up at New Regency, with principal photography scheduled for fall that year or early 2001 in San Francisco.

=== Mr. & Mrs. Smith ===
On January 7, 2002, it was indicated in Variety that Schumacher had circled directing Simon Kinberg's NYU thesis script Mr. and Mrs. Smith at Regency Enterprises. The film was ultimately greenlit for production with Doug Liman attached as director, and released in 2005.

=== On the Road ===
On February 24, 2002, Schumacher was hired by Francis Ford Coppola to adapt Jack Kerouac's novel On the Road with Billy Crudup as Sal Paradise and Colin Farrell as Dean Moriarty. Walter Salles ultimately directed the 2012 adaptation.

=== A Star Is Born remake ===
On September 27, 2002, Schumacher was attached to remake A Star Is Born, with Will Smith and Jennifer Lopez attached to play the leads for Warner Bros. Bradley Cooper would later direct a separate production of a fourth remake in 2018.

=== Cruel and Unusual ===
On April 2, 2003, The Hollywood Reporter announced that Schumacher was negotiating to develop and direct a screen version of Patricia Cornwell's Cruel and Unusual for Columbia Pictures. The project was set to be the first of a planned series of films featuring the medical examiner character Kay Scarpetta. By August, Stephen Schiff struck a deal to adapt the novel. The film was slated to go into production by January 2005, though by 2004 it was reported that Schumacher had opted to delay the film in favor of doing The Crowded Room instead.

=== Inland Saints ===
On April 17, 2007, Schumacher was attached to direct Kurt Sutter's supernatural urban crime drama Inland Saints for Paramount Pictures. On November 17, 2008, Mark Swift and Damian Shannon was attached to rewrite Inland Saints to reflect Schumacher's post-apocalyptic, action horror direction for the film. There were no further developments since then.

=== Breaking News remake ===
On July 25, 2007, Schumacher was in talks to direct an American remake of Johnnie To's action crime thriller Breaking News for Paramount Vantage.

== 2010s ==
=== The Hive ===
On April 25, 2011, Schumacher was attached to direct Richard D'Ovidio's suspense thriller The Hive for Troika Pictures, which eventually became Brad Anderson's The Call.

=== The Big Girls TV pilot ===
On June 27, 2011, Schumacher was in talks to direct the pilot of Adam Mazer's television adaptation of the Susanna Moore novel The Big Girls for HBO, which didn't materialize.

== Offers ==
On October 13, 2011, Schumacher opened up about rejecting offers to direct sequels to his films St. Elmo's Fire, The Lost Boys and Flatliners, with the latter being the only materialized project, albeit without the involvement of Schumacher.
