= Point of Origin (novel) =

1998 novel by Patricia Cornwell

- First edition
- Author: Patricia Cornwell
- Language: English
- Series: Kay Scarpetta
- Genre: Crime fiction
- Publisher: G. P. Putnam's Sons
- Publication date: 1998
- Publication place: United States
- Media type: Print (hardcover, paperback)
- Pages: 416
- ISBN: 0-399-14394-7
- OCLC: 41929864
- Preceded by: Unnatural Exposure
- Followed by: Black Notice

Point of Origin is a crime fiction novel by American writer Patricia Cornwell. It is the ninth book in the Dr. Kay Scarpetta series.

== Characters in Point of Origin ==
- Kay Scarpetta – Chief Medical Examiner. Consulting pathologist for ATF.
- Benton Wesley – FBI Profiler.
- Lucy Farinelli – Kay's niece, she was an FBI agent, but left due to her implications of her sexual orientation. She had a romantic relationship with Carrie Grethen. She went to ATF thereafter. It was revealed for the first time that she had slept with men – two.
- Pete Marino – Captain in the Richmond Police Department.
- T.N. McGovern – Being known as Teun to people around her, she was Lucy's mentor, and the team leader of ATF's National Response Team (NRT) for the incident at Warrenton, Virginia. She's around Kay's age and is based in the Philadelphia field office. Also known to have a strong animosity towards reporters.
- Kenneth Sparkes – Media mogul. Owner of the ranch in Warrenton, Virginia that was burnt down. He was a strikingly handsome man, tall and lean, with thick gray hair. His eyes were amber, his features aristocratic, with a straight Jeffersonian nose and skin dark and as smooth as a man half his age. Known to be a collector of bourbon, World War II weapons and fine horses. He was not too fond of Kay, as there was more than one occasion when they disagreed about case details he thought should be released to the media. At the time of the fire, he claimed to be at Beaverdam, Virginia, with his horse trainer, Betty Foster. 19 of his horses were killed in the fire.
- Betty Foster – Kenneth Sparkes horse trainer, based in Beaverdam.

=== Victims ===
- 2 unnamed victims in England – First victim was in London, 1981, followed by one in Liverpool, 1983.
- 11 unnamed victims in Ireland – From 1984 to 1987, starting in Belfast, he then continued into the country in Galway, followed by nine murders in Dublin in neighbourhoods such as Malahide, Santry and Howth.
- 9 unnamed victims in United States – Mainly out west, in remote areas of Utah, Nevada, Montana and Washington, and once in Mississippi. Those bodies in United States never found. Then four were found in Virginia. The first, in 1995, near Virginia Beach, the next in Norfolk. Then in 1996, one in Lynchburg, the other in Blacksburg.
- Marlene Farber – Died October 1997, before the events of the book. Twenty-three-year-old actress whose career consisted mainly of small parts on soap operas and sitcoms. She was found in her home, which was burning heavily, reduced to white, calcinated fragments. Identification was by a comparison of antemortem and postmortem X-rays of her remains was made to a routine chest film taken two years before. No accelerants for the fire were detected, and the point of origin of the fire was in the bathroom of the master bathroom.
- Austin Hart – Died March 1998, before the events of the book. Twenty-five-year-old, fourth year medical student at Johns Hopkins University. He was found at home, so badly burnt that he could be identified by similarities of tooth root and trabecular alveolar bone points in antemortem and postmortem radiographs. Fire started in the bathroom.
- 19 horses at Kenneth Sparkes ranch – They were killed in the fire. Witnesses claimed that they screamed and wailed like people while they were being burnt.
- Claire Rawley – Blond, struggling model, she was an undergrad who met Kenneth Sparkes at Wrightsville Beach. Found dead in the master bedroom bath at Kenneth Sparks's house in Warrenton, body burnt, with a glass door on top of her. Her arms had disintegrated due to the intense heat of the fire. There was hemorrhaging at her neck, and blood in her airway, which is uncharacteristic for a death due to fire. She also had no traces of carbon in her oesophagus, which led Kay to believe her death was a homicide. Fire started in the master bathroom.
- Kellie Shephard – Thirty-two-year-old black female who worked as a nurse in Lehigh County, Pennsylvania. She was found lying face down, with her right hand under her chest, and left hand outstretched. She had multiple stab wounds all over her body and one on her neck, which indicated that her throat had been cut. Her place had been torched, but the fire was not sufficient to eliminate evidence of her cause of death. Fire started in the bathroom.
- Benton Wesley – Found in a grocery shop downtown. Face charred beyond recognition, but was identified by Kay from the Breitling watch she gave him. Hands and ankles were burnt to the point of detachment, and handcuffs were found nearby, double locked, suggesting he was probably cuffed and burnt to death.

=== Other deaths ===
- Newton Joyce – Murderer of the above named victims. Known to be pretty well off in finances. He was working as a psychiatrist at the time of the book, for Carrie Grethen. He committed the murders alone, up until 1997 when he first met Carrie Grethen, after which he decided to change his Modus Operandi, from dismemberments to arson. His face was heavily scarred by acne, and this was the reason he carved out his victim's faces, to deprive them of the beauty he never had. They were placed on mannequin heads, wrapped up in layers of plastic, and stored in his refrigerator. He also aided in Carrie Grethen's escape by means of his personal helicopter. For reasons unclear he decides to help Carrie in her plan against Scarpetta, and willingly exposes his history of murders ending in a suicidal attack, along with Carrie, on Scarpetta and her niece in which his helicopter crashes killing them both.
- Carrie Grethen – Archnemesis of Kay Scarpetta and former accomplice to the late serial killer Temple Brooks Gault in Cruel and Unusual, The Body Farm, and From Potter's Field. She was Lucy's lover while they were both at the Quantico, until it was revealed that she had used Lucy. She was interned at Kirby Forensic Psychiatric Center at Wards Island, New York, but she escaped soon after. She also sent a letter to the press, exposing the allegations against her as a cover up by Kay Scarpetta and Benton Wesley for their mistakes, and "to make the FBI look good." She was described as tall and striking, with blazing eyes and a condescending smile.
