= Scarpetta =

Scarpetta is an Italian word meaning "small shoe" and may refer to:

== Arts, entertainment, and media ==
- Kay Scarpetta, a fictional character in a series of novels by Patricia Cornwell
  - Scarpetta (novel), a 2008 novel in the series
  - Scarpetta (TV series), based on the character, starring Nicole Kidman

== People ==
=== Given name ===
- Scarpetta Ordelaffi (died c. 1315) was an Italian condottiero and lord of Forlì

=== Surname ===
- Eduardo Scarpetta (1853–1925), Italian actor and playwright
- Eduardo Scarpetta (born 1993), Italian actor
- Cody Scarpetta (born 1988), minor league baseball pitcher
- Sergio Scarpetta (born 1975), Italian grandmaster of English draughts

== Other uses ==
- Scarpetta, an American restaurant founded by Scott Conant (born 1971)
