= Health Brigade =

Free clinic in Virginia, United States

- Formation: 1968
- Type: Non-profit
- Legal status: Currently operating
- Location: Richmond, Virginia, U.S.
- Official language: English, Spanish
- Staff: 32
- Website: www.healthbrigade.org

The Health Brigade, formerly Fan Free Clinic, is a non-profit free community clinic located in the Museum District in Richmond, Virginia. The clinic was first formed in 1968 by a nurse, two doctors and a minister and in 1970, was located on Floyd Avenue at the Emerson House of the First Unitarian Church before moving to their current location on Thompson Street. It is considered to be an early example of free clinics, and the oldest of its kind in Virginia. The Health Brigade operates with both paid employees and unpaid volunteers, and clients of the clinic must undergo a financial screening to determine their eligibility.

As a whole, the Health Brigade offers primary care services and testing and treatment of sexually-transmitted diseases. The separate areas available are the medical clinic, health and outreach services, mental health services, and HIV testing and information. In 2016, the Fan Free Clinic changed its name to Health Brigade.

== In other media ==
- The clinic is mentioned in the 1997 novel Unnatural Exposure by Patricia Cornwell.
