= Body farm (disambiguation) =

A body farm is a research facility where human decomposition is studied.

Body farm may also refer to:

- The Body Farm (novel), a crime fiction novel by Patricia Cornwell
- The Body Farm (TV series), a BBC police procedural crime drama
- The University of Tennessee Anthropological Research Facility, popularly known as the Body Farm
- "A Body Farm", a song by the deathgrind band Cattle Decapitation
