= Blowfly =

Blowfly or blow fly may refer to:

- Calliphoridae, a family of flies
- Blowfly (musician) (1939–2016), also known by his real name Clarence Reid
- Blow Fly (novel), a 2003 Patricia Cornwell novel
