= Last Precinct =

Last Precinct may refer to:

- The Last Precinct, American TV series beginning 1986
- The Last Precinct (novel), 2000 crime novel by Patricia Cornwell
