= Predator (Cornwell novel) =

2005 novel by Patricia Cornwell

- US cover
- Author: Patricia Cornwell
- Language: English
- Series: Kay Scarpetta Mysteries
- Genre: Crime novel
- Publisher: G. P. Putnam's Sons
- Publication date: October 2005
- Publication place: United States
- Media type: Print (Hardcover, Paperback)
- Pages: 416 (first edition, hardback)
- ISBN: 0-399-15283-0 (first edition, hardback)
- OCLC: 61200772
- Dewey Decimal: 813/.54 22
- LC Class: PS3553.O692 P74 2005
- Preceded by: Trace
- Followed by: Book of the Dead

Predator is a crime fiction novel by Patricia Cornwell, the fourteenth book of the Dr. Kay Scarpetta series.

The title comes from an acronym for the Prefrontal Determinants of Aggressive-Type Overt Responsivity, an in-novel secret neuropsychological project to determine whether dangerous murderers have different brain patterns or functions from "ordinary" people.

== Plot summary ==
Dr. Kay Scarpetta, now freelancing with the National Forensic Academy in Florida, takes charge of a case that stretches from steamy Florida to snowbound Massachusetts, one as unnerving as any she has ever faced. The teasing psychological clues lead Scarpetta and her team—Pete Marino, Benton Wesley, and Lucy Farinelli—to suspect that they are hunting someone with a cunning and malevolent mind whose secrets have kept them in the shadows, until now.

== Literary significance and criticism ==
Cornwell was considered courageous by some reviewers for setting the characters of this novel at a major crossroads. All are on edge about their personal lives, relationships, and especially their long dependence upon and affection for each other. Mutual trusts have been eroded over previous books and the group lacks the cohesion it had earlier in the series.

The narrative style seen in previous books is also seen in Predator, with more than one character narrating. This change in narrative style from the first-person narration of Kay herself is one first seen in Blow Fly. This device not only allows for more characters and their perspectives to come to the fore, but also marks a significant transformation in the way that the novels represent the criminal. Whereas previously the criminal's mind was never made available to the reader—thus intensifying their "otherness"—the later novels allow space to explore their point of view and uncover their motivations.
