= Trace (novel) =

Crime fiction novel by Patricia Cornwell

- 2004 Hardcover dustjacket
- Author: Patricia Cornwell
- Language: English
- Series: Kay Scarpetta Mysteries
- Genre: Crime novel
- Publisher: G. P. Putnam's Sons
- Publication date: September 2004
- Publication place: United States
- Media type: Print (Hardcover, Paperback)
- Pages: 448 pp (first edition, hardback)
- ISBN: 0-399-15219-9 (first edition, hardback)
- OCLC: 55044519
- Dewey Decimal: 813/.54 22
- LC Class: PS3553.O692 T73 2004
- Preceded by: Blow Fly
- Followed by: Predator

Trace is a 2004 crime fiction novel by Patricia Cornwell. It is the thirteenth book of the Dr. Kay Scarpetta series.

== Plot summary ==
Dr. Kay Scarpetta, having left Richmond, Virginia five years ago to become a freelancer, is asked to return at the request of her replacement, Chief Medical Examiner Joel Marcus. A young girl has been murdered, but very few clues are available. In parallel her niece Lucy is investigating an attack on her companion Henri. Henri has been sent for analysis and safe keeping to stay with Benton Wesley, Scarpetta's partner. Scarpetta's investigations are hampered by Marcus's ineptness and the disarray of her former lab.

== Characters ==
- Kay Scarpetta: Former medical examiner
- Benton Wesley: Profiler
- Lucy Farinelli: Kay's niece
- Pete Marino: Detective

== Literary significance & criticism ==
This novel was considered to be an improvement over previous lacklustre installments by some reviewers. Dale Singer of the St Louis Post Dispatch described the book as combining "sensitivity to human emotions with the latest in forensic techniques - and one of the creepiest villains to come along since "Silence of the Lambs." Others, however, considered it to be repetitious and meandering, still not a full return to form.

In Trace, one of Scarpetta's former employees, Edgar Allan Pogue, is discovered to be pursuing her niece, Lucy. Although diagnosed as "psychotic" by Benton Wesley, a criminal profiler, a number of chapters are narrated from his perspective which help to account for his behaviour. This change in narrative style from the first-person narration of Kay herself is one first seen in the previous work in the series, Blow Fly. This device not only allows for more characters and their perspectives to come to the fore, but also marks a significant transformation in the way that the novels represent the criminal. Where previously the criminal's mind was never made available to the reader – thus intensifying their "otherness" – the later novels allow space to explore their point of view and uncover their motivations.

The writing crudely diminishes all those whom Scarpetta dislikes, leaving the reader little space for judgment. The third person brings out the self focussed contradictory mindset of many of the familiar characters. It is not clear whether this is intended by Cornwell. For example, Scarpetta constantly is said to have been fired from her role as Chief Medical Examiner, yet her resignation is well set out in The Last Precinct, along with her internal satisfaction at resigning. In Trace she complains about not being told the building that once housed her office was being destroyed, yet in earlier books she constantly complained about its limitations. In a similar way Lucy, her niece, is derogatory about her neighbor for her house, reliance on security, interest in her neighbors - all traits equally applicable to Lucy. That the criminal is portrayed as driven by an insult by Lucy when a child a decade before the period of the book also goes to the series self focus - the various killers from Carrie Grethren to Chandonne and now to Pogue each come to target Scarpetta.

== Setting ==
Trace is set in Richmond, Virginia; Miami, Florida; and Aspen, Colorado.
