= Hornet's Nest (novel) =

1997 book by Patricia Cornwell

- First edition
- Author: Patricia Cornwell
- Language: English
- Genre: Crime
- Publisher: G. P. Putnam's Sons
- Publication date: 1997
- Publication place: USA
- Media type: Print
- Pages: 372
- ISBN: 978-0-425-16098-5
- OCLC: 38177366
- Followed by: Southern Cross

Hornet's Nest (1997) is a book by author Patricia Cornwell, set in Charlotte, North Carolina, which was called "a hornet's nest of rebellion" by Cornwallis during the American Revolutionary War.

== Characters ==
- Virginia West – 42-year-old Deputy Chief.
- Judy Hammer – Chief of Police.
- Andy Brazil – Journalist & Volunteer Cop.

== Adaptation ==
The book was adapted as a made-for-TV movie that premiered Saturday, March 31, 2012 at 8 p.m. exclusively on TNT. The television film adaptation starred Virginia Madsen, Sherry Stringfield, Michael Boatman, Robbie Amell, Jane McNeill, and Quentin Kerr.
