= Body of Evidence (novel) =

1991 novel by Patricia Cornwell

- First edition
- Author: Patricia Cornwell
- Language: English
- Series: Kay Scarpetta
- Genre: Crime fiction
- Publisher: Charles Scribner's Sons
- Publication date: 1991
- Publication place: United States of America
- Media type: Print (hardcover, paperback)
- Pages: 256
- ISBN: 0-6841-9240-3
- OCLC: 56980753
- Preceded by: Postmortem
- Followed by: All That Remains

Body of Evidence is a crime fiction novel by Patricia Cornwell. It is the second book in the Dr. Kay Scarpetta series.

== Plot summary ==
Kay Scarpetta, chief medical examiner of Virginia, gets involved in the case of a brutal stabbing death in Richmond of romance writer Beryl Madison. Then, Madison's greedy lawyer accuses Scarpetta of losing his client's latest manuscript, an autobiographical expose of Beryl's early life as protégé of a legendary novelist. As more deaths occur and the killer closes in on her, Kay finds herself also having to deal with the unexpected reappearance of her long-lost lover Mark James. Scarpetta soon finds herself living Beryl's nightmare.

== Characters ==
- Kay Scarpetta: Chief Medical Examiner.
- Benton Wesley: FBI profiler. "Benton Wesley could be as Prussian as the rest of them, but over the years he had won my respect. Beneath his Bureau boilerplate was a human being worth knowing. He was brisk and energetic, even when he was sitting, and he was typically dapper in his dark suit trousers and starched white shirt. His necktie was fashionably narrow and perfectly knotted, the black holster on his belt lonely for its ten-millimeter, which he almost never wore indoors. I hadn't seen Benton Wesley for a while and he hadn't changed. He was fit and handsome in a hard way, with premature silver-gray hair that never failed to surprise me."
- Pete Marino: Recently promoted to Lieutenant in the Richmond Police Department.
- Mark James: Kay's ex-lover, whom she met when she was enrolled in law school at Georgetown. "He was going to be a lawyer because his father and grandfather were lawyers. I was Catholic, Mark was Protestant. I was Italian, he was as Anglo as Prince Charles. I was brought up poor, he was brought up in one of the wealthiest residential districts of Boston."
- Frankie Aims: Mentally unstable friend of Al Hunt. Becomes obsessed with Beryl and eventually murders her in her Richmond home.
- Sparacino: Beryl's agent.

=== Victims ===
- Beryl Stratton Madison
- Cary Harper
- Sterling Harper (suicide)
- Al Hunt (suicide)

== Major themes ==
- The unknown killer's obsession with Beryl Madison.
- The inability to outrun evil. Scarpetta's moving to Key West temporarily, in an attempt to escape the killer, is similar to Beryl's running to a safe haven before being murdered. The only difference was that Scarpetta managed to defeat the killer.

== Reception ==
Following the success of Postmortem, with which Cornwell became the first author to receive the Edgar, Creasey, Anthony and Macavity Awards and the French Prix du Roman d'Adventure in a single year, the price of Cornwell's book deals went up quite a bit from the $7,500 or less which was paid for Postmortem. In March 1991 she signed a $385,000 deal for the paperback rights to Body of Evidence.
