= Book of the Dead (Cornwell novel) =

2007 novel by Patricia Cornwell

- First edition
- Author: Patricia Cornwell
- Language: English
- Series: Kay Scarpetta
- Genre: Crime fiction
- Publisher: Charles Scribner's Sons, Berkley Books, Sphere Books
- Publication date: 2007
- Publication place: USA
- Media type: Print (hardcover, paperback)
- Pages: 432 (Paperback Sphere edition)
- ISBN: 978-0-7515-3405-4
- Preceded by: Predator
- Followed by: Scarpetta

Book of the Dead is a 2007 crime novel written by Patricia Cornwell. It is the fifteenth book in the popular Kay Scarpetta series and the fourth consecutive novel in the series to be written in third-person omniscient style, rather than Cornwell's traditional first-person narrative.

== Synopsis ==
Kay Scarpetta has started a private practice in South Carolina. She is called to Rome to consult in the murder investigation of teenage American tennis star Drew Martin. When in Rome, Kay becomes engaged to her longtime lover Benton Wesley, an occurrence that has devastating consequences for Kay’s longtime friend and investigative partner, Pete Marino. The timing is bad as the killer of Drew Martin, quickly known as the Sandman, spreads death and destruction from Italy to the American South. Passively assisted by his estranged parents, both known by if not loved by Kay, and his ex-girlfriend who has devious deeds of her own to do, the Sandman is an international mystery for Kay, Benton, Marino, and Kay’s niece Lucy.

== Reception ==
Cornwell's Scarpetta series has been criticized for being repetitive and morbid by some critics whilst other reviewers claim that the characters in Cornwell's recent books have been "shallow" and "overused". Others have praised the series for the unique plots in the series and Cornwell's characterisation of Scarpetta.
