= Bouchercon XXII =

1991 mystery and detective fiction convention

- "Bouchercon .22"
- Date: October 11, 1991
- Location: Pasadena, California
- Country: USA
- Hosted by: Len & June Moffatt

Bouchercon is an annual convention of creators and devotees of mystery and detective fiction. It is named in honour of writer, reviewer, and editor Anthony Boucher; also the inspiration for the Anthony Awards, which have been issued at the convention since 1986. This page details Bouchercon XXII and the 6th Anthony Awards ceremony.

== Bouchercon ==
The convention was held in Pasadena, California on October 11, 1991; running until the 13th. The event was chaired by Len & June Moffatt, founders and editors of the JDM Bibliophile, a fanzine and journal dedicated the works of John D. MacDonald.

=== Special Guests ===
- Lifetime Achievement award — William Campbell Gault
- Guest of Honor — Edward D. Hoch
- Guest of Honor (visual media) — William Link
- Fan Guest of Honor — Bruce Pelz
- Toastmaster — Bill Crider

== Anthony Awards ==
The following list details the awards distributed at the sixth annual Anthony Awards ceremony.

=== Novel award ===
Winner:

- Sue Grafton, "G" Is for Gumshoe

Shortlist:

- Lawrence Block, A Ticket to the Boneyard
- Lia Matera, The Good Fight
- Sharyn McCrumb, If Ever I Return, Pretty Peggy-O
- Julie Smith, New Orleans Mourning

=== First novel award ===
Winner:

- Patricia Daniels Cornwell, Postmortem

Shortlist:

- Diane Mott Davidson, Catering to Nobody
- Janet Dawson, Kindred Crimes
- Rochelle Krich, Where's Mommy Now?
- James McCahery, Grave Undertaking

=== Paperback original award ===
Winners:

- Rochelle Krich, Where's Mommy Now?
- James McCahery, Grave Undertaking

Shortlist:

- Jane Haddam, Not a Creature was Stirring
- G.J. Oliphant, Dead in the Scrub
- Marilyn Wallace, Sisters in Crime 2

=== Short story award ===
Winner:

- Susan Dunlap, "The Celestial Buffet", from Sisters in Crime 2

Shortlist:

- Sharyn McCrumb, "The Luncheon", from Sisters in Crime 2
- Sharyn McCrumb, "Remains to be Seen", from Mummy Stories
- Sarah Shankman, "Say You're Sorry", from Sisters in Crime 3
- Marilyn Wallace, "A Tale of Two Pretties", from Sisters in Crime 3

=== Critical / Non-fiction award ===
Winner:

- Jon L. Breen & Martin H. Greenberg, Synod Of Sleuths: Essays on Judeo-Christian Detective Fiction

Shortlist:

- Serita Deborah Stevens & Anne Klarner, Deadly Doses: A Writer's Guide to Poisons
- Peter Lewis, Eric Ambler
- S. T. Joshi, John Dickson Carr: a Critical Study
- John Conquest, Trouble Is Their Business: Private Eyes in Fiction, Film & Television, 1927-1988

=== Motion Picture award ===
Winner:

- Presumed Innocent

Shortlist:

- Goodfellas
- The Grifters

=== Television series award ===
Winner:

- Mystery!

Shortlist:

- Gabriel's Fire
- Law & Order
- Matlock
- Murder, She Wrote
