= Knackwurst =

Short, plump, Low German sausage type

A set of Saxon Knacker served together with kale at the Dresden Christmas market.

Knackwurst (German pronunciation: [ˈknakˌvʊʁst]) (in North America sometimes spelled knockwurst (US: /ˈnɑːkwɜːrst/ NAHK-wurst) refers to a type of sausage of northern German origin from the mid-16th century. The many available varieties depend on the geographical region of their production.

== Etymology and pronunciation ==
The German noun Knackwurst—which, in English, is sometimes corrupted as knockwurst—comes from the German verb knacken ("to crack") or the adjective knackig ("crisp"). This refers to the swelling of the sausage during the process of cooking, so that the skin becomes pressurized and balloon-like, and tends to "pop", often exploding the juices, when bitten into (authentic example:). (Cf. the British term "banger".) Etymologically, the term "knackwurst" arose in Germany in the middle of the 16th century. In Germany, all different kinds of Knackwürste are abbreviated Knacker.

== Knackwurst in Germany & Austria ==
Numerous regional varieties of knackwurst exist in Germany. They all differ from knackwurst varieties sold in Austria. There, a knackwurst always refers to a sausage containing bacon and added potato starch. In addition to the term "knackwurst", common names are "Salzburger" or "Schübling".

As a specialty in Hamburg, scalded Knackwurst served with mustard and half a slice of white bread is a popular snack for lunch. It is also sold at the Hamburger Dom, the largest Volksfest in northern Germany, under various, sometimes poetic, names like Domknacker, Hamburger Knacker, or Hafenlümmel (literally: harbour tyke).

In Austria, Knackwurst is jokingly referred to as a Beamtenforelle (literally civil servant's trout). The term can be traced back to Julius Raab, former Chancellor of Austria, whose favourite dish is reported to have been Knackwurst. This term was in reference to the modest earnings of civil servants at the time.

== Knockwurst in the US ==
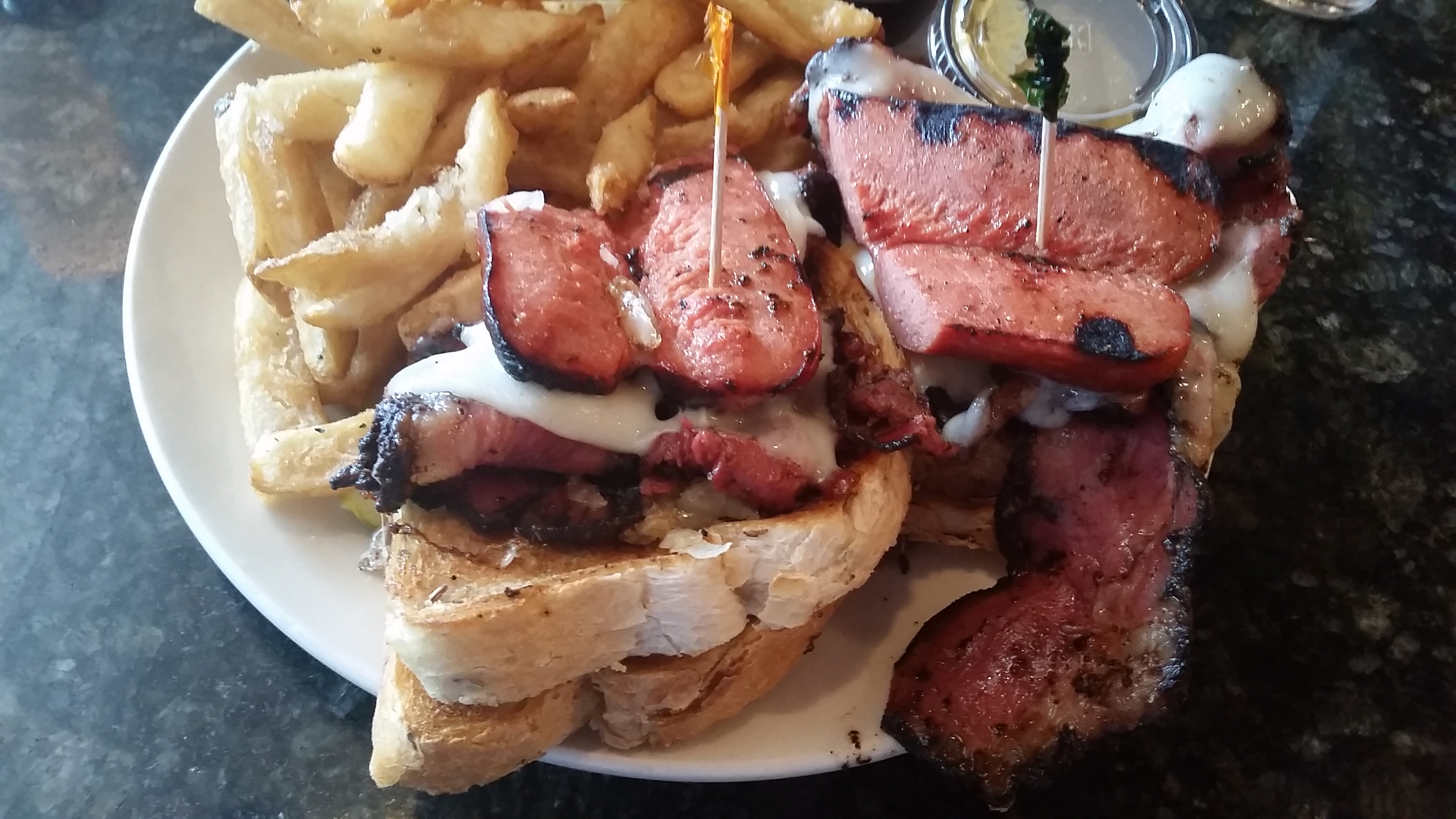
Knockwurst on a Sailor sandwich

In North America, a knockwurst refers to a short, plump sausage originating from northern Germany. It contains ground veal, ground pork, and fresh garlic stuffed into hog casings.

As part of the production process, the sausages are aged for two to five days, then smoked over oak wood. Knockwurst is often prepared highly seasoned.

Knockwurst is sometimes cut in half lengthwise before serving, for example when served on a sailor sandwich.

== See also ==
- List of sausages
- List of smoked foods
