= Scarpetta (TV series) =

American crime drama television series (2026–present)

- Genre: Crime thriller; Procedural drama
- Based on: The novels by Patricia Cornwell
- Developed by: Liz Sarnoff
- Showrunner: Liz Sarnoff
- Starring: Nicole Kidman; Bobby Cannavale; Jamie Lee Curtis; Simon Baker; Rosy McEwen; Jacob Lumet Cannavale; Hunter Parrish; Ariana DeBose
- Music by: Jeff Russo; Perrine Virgile
- Country of origin: United States
- Original language: English
- No. of seasons: 1
- No. of episodes: 8

Production
- Executive producers: Liz Sarnoff; Nicole Kidman; Per Saari; Jamie Lee Curtis; Patricia Cornwell; Jason Blum; David Gordon Green; Jeremy Gold; Chris Dickie; Chris McCumber; Amy Sayres
- Producer: Mary Kane
- Cinematography: Michael Simmonds; John Brawley; Eliot Rockett
- Editors: Colin Patton; JoAnne Yarrow; Cecily Rhett; Andrew Wesman
- Production companies: Blossom Films; Comet Pictures; Sarnoff TV; P & S Projects, LLC; Blumhouse Television; Amazon MGM Studios

Original release
- Network: Amazon Prime Video
- Release: March 11, 2026 – present

Scarpetta is an American crime drama television series developed by Liz Sarnoff and based on the book series of the same name by Patricia Cornwell. It stars Nicole Kidman as the titular character as Dr. Kay Scarpetta, a forensic pathologist who uses forensic technology to solve crimes. The series also stars Bobby Cannavale, Jamie Lee Curtis, Simon Baker, Rosy McEwen, Jacob Lumet Cannavale, Hunter Parrish, and Ariana DeBose. Kidman and Curtis also serve as executive producers alongside Cornwell and Sarnoff. The series premiered on Amazon Prime Video on March 11, 2026.

== Premise ==
The show centers around Kay Scarpetta (Nicole Kidman), who is a brilliant forensic pathologist. Inspired by former Virginia Chief Medical Examiner Marcella Farinelli Fierro, she employs advanced forensic technology to unravel mysteries and solve crimes. Settings include Florida, Virginia, and Charleston, South Carolina.

== Cast and characters ==
=== Main ===
- Nicole Kidman as Dr. Kay Scarpetta, the chief medical examiner of the Commonwealth of Virginia
  - Rosy McEwen as young Kay
- Bobby Cannavale as Pete Marino, a former detective who works as a forensic operations specialist for Scarpetta and Dorothy's husband
  - Jacob Lumet Cannavale as young Pete
- Jamie Lee Curtis as Dorothy Scarpetta, Kay's older sister and a children's book author
  - Amanda Righetti as young Dorothy
- Simon Baker as Benton Wesley, an FBI profiler and Scarpetta's husband
  - Hunter Parrish as young Benton
- Ariana DeBose as Lucy Farinelli-Watson, Dorothy's daughter, Scarpetta's niece, and a computer programmer and IT expert
  - Savannah Lumar as young Lucy. Scarpetta reluctantly raises her when Dorothy runs off with another man in the late 1990s.

=== Recurring ===
- Tiya Sircar as Blaise Fruge, a police officer and Pete's mentee
- Janet Montgomery as Janet, Lucy's deceased wife
- Sosie Bacon as Abby Turnbull, a prize-winning journalist
- Stephanie Faracy as Maggie Cutbush, Scarpetta's inherited assistant from her predecessor
  - Georgia King as young Maggie Cutbush
- Mike Vogel as Bill Boltz, a city attorney
- Anson Mount as Matt Petersen, a former actor whose wife was murdered 28 years ago
  - Graham Phillips as young Matt Petersen
- Anna Diop as Sierra "Tron" Patron, a FBI cyber investigator and works alongside Benton
- Natalija Nogulich as Yaya, a friend of Scarpetta's who babysits for her
- David Arquette (season 2)
- Jodi Balfour (season 2)
- William Zabka (season 2)
- Stella Baker (season 2)
- Kim Dickens (season 2)
- Troy Garity (season 2)
- Jerod Haynes (season 2)
- Michael "Killer Mike" Render (season 2)
- Holland Taylor (season 2)

Charlie B. Foster co-stars as Wingo, Scarpetta's assistant in the morgue. Scarpetta author Patricia Cornwell has a cameo in the series premiere as the official who swears in Kay in as chief medical examiner.

== Episodes ==
No.	Title	Directed by	Written by	Original release date
1	"Bridge of Time, Part One"	David Gordon Green	Liz Sarnoff	March 11, 2026
2	"Kay"	David Gordon Green	Liz Sarnoff	March 11, 2026
3	"Dot"	Charlotte Brändström	Iturri Sosa	March 11, 2026
4	"Pete"	Charlotte Brändström	Ahmadu Garba	March 11, 2026
5	"Hello from space, my Dear"	Charlotte Brändström; David Gordon Green	Matthew Zucker	March 11, 2026
6	"Benton"	David Gordon Green	Maisha Closson	March 11, 2026
7	"L + J"	Ellen Kuras	Alison Balian	March 11, 2026
8	"Bridge of Time, Part Two"	David Gordon Green	Liz Sarnoff	March 11, 2026

== Production ==
=== Development ===
In June 2021, it was reported that a television series adaptation of the novel series was in development from Comet Pictures, a production company owned by Jamie Lee Curtis and Blumhouse Television. Patricia Cornwell, Jamie Lee Curtis, Jason Blum, Chris McCumber, Jeremy Gold and Chris Dickie would serve as the show's executive producers.

In February 2023, it was announced that Nicole Kidman and Jamie Lee Curtis would join the cast and also serve as executive producers on the show. This marked the first instance of Scarpetta being adapted for the screen, following numerous previous attempts. Initially, in 1992, Demi Moore was briefly associated with the Scarpetta character, while Angelina Jolie was contemplating a big-screen franchise based on the role in 2009. A two-season order, each consisting of eight episodes, was anticipated for the series. At the beginning, when the project was announced, no showrunner was attached. However, it was later confirmed that Liz Sarnoff would step in as the series' writer and showrunner. David Gordon Green and Amy Sayres also served as executive producers.

Although the series was initially announced as Kay Scarpetta, the title was changed to Scarpetta when the casting updates were revealed. David Gordon Green was reported to be directing the first two episodes. Charlotte Brändström was noted as one of the directors.

=== Casting ===
In February 2023, Nicole Kidman was cast in the series in the titular role, alongside Jamie Lee Curtis playing Kay's sister Dorothy. In September 2024, Bobby Cannavale, Simon Baker, Ariana DeBose, Rosy McEwen, and Jake Cannavale joined the cast. Later that same month, Sosie Bacon, Amanda Righetti, Janet Montgomery, Stephanie Faracy and Mike Vogel were added to the cast. In October 2024, Hunter Parrish was reported to star. In November 2024, Tiya Sircar, Anna Diop, Graham Phillips and Georgia King were announced to star in recurring roles. In March 2025, Charlie B. Foster was announced to have joined the cast in a recurring role. In May 2026, it was reported that David Arquette, Jodi Balfour, William Zabka, Stella Baker, Kim Dickens, Troy Garity, Jerod Haynes, Michael "Killer Mike" Render, and Holland Taylor were cast in recurring capacities for the second season.

=== Filming ===
Filming was originally scheduled to begin in Nashville in September 2024, but was later postponed to October 2024. On March 8, 2025, Curtis announced that filming of the first season had wrapped.

On March 31, 2026, the second season had started production. The filming of the second season wrapped on July 10, 2026.

== Release ==
Scarpetta premiered on Amazon Prime Video on March 11, 2026, and the first season consists of eight episodes.

== Reception ==
=== Critical response ===
Metacritic review
breakdown (unweighted)

Positive
6 (25%)
Mixed
16 (67%)
Negative
2 (8%)

For the first season, the series holds a 57% approval rating on review aggregator Rotten Tomatoes, based on 67 critic reviews. The website's critics consensus reads, "A little messy and occasionally all over the place, Scarpetta still makes for a fun watch thanks to its stacked cast and a mystery that's just compelling enough to keep viewers digging for more." Metacritic, which uses a weighted average, assigned a score of 54 out of 100 based on 24 critics, indicating "mixed or average".

=== Audience viewership ===
According to Nielsen's latest data, measuring only U.S. views on TV sets, the first season was placed #4 and #6 in the original series and overall chart during the week of 9–15 March. It maintained its #7 position for the original series chart for the week of 16–22 March.
