= The Bone Bed =

Book by Patricia Cornwell

- First edition
- Author: Patricia Cornwell
- Language: English
- Series: Kay Scarpetta Mysteries
- Genre: Crime novel
- Publisher: G. P. Putnam's Sons
- Publication date: 2012
- Publication place: United States
- Media type: Print (Hardcover, Paperback)
- Pages: 463 (first edition, hardback)
- ISBN: 978-1-4087-0344-1 (first edition, hardback)
- OCLC: 213308424
- Preceded by: Red Mist
- Followed by: Dust

The Bone Bed is novel by Patricia Cornwell. It was published by G. P. Putnam's Sons in 2012. The book is a continuation of Cornwell's popular Kay Scarpetta series.

== Synopsis ==
A woman has vanished while digging a dinosaur bone bed in the remote wilderness of Canada. Somehow, the only evidence has made its way to the inbox of Chief Medical Examiner Kay Scarpetta, over two thousand miles away in Boston. She has no idea why.
