= Black Notice =

1999 novel by Patricia Cornwell

- First edition
- Author: Patricia Cornwell
- Language: English
- Series: Kay Scarpetta
- Genre: Crime novel
- Publisher: G. P. Putnam's Sons
- Publication date: 1999
- Publication place: United States of America
- Media type: Print (hardcover, paperback)
- Pages: 415 pp
- ISBN: 0-399-14508-7
- OCLC: 44749941
- Preceded by: Point of Origin
- Followed by: The Last Precinct

Black Notice is a crime novel by American writer Patricia Cornwell. It is the tenth book of the Dr. Kay Scarpetta series.

== Plot summary ==
Dr. Kay Scarpetta is still shocked by the tragic loss of Benton Wesley. She is trying to carry on, but she gets a letter from Benton, written before his death and left to Senator Lord, who had agreed to deliver it a year after his death.

Dr Scarpetta and Marino start working on a new case after a body is found in a container arriving from Belgium. There is writing in the container that says "Bon voyage, le loup-garou" (Have a nice trip, the werewolf). The body has a strange tattoo and wears rich clothes and there are some baby-like hairs inside the garments. Kay and Marino get in touch with European Interpol and with Jay Talley, who calls them and asks them to fly to Paris and meet the Chief Medical Examiner. They discover that the body found in the container is a member of one of the richest and oldest families of Paris, the Chandonnes, who live in an ancient mansion on the Île St Louis. It is also rumored that this family have a son with a rare disease that makes hair grow on his entire body (hypertrichosis). This person has always been hidden, and he is believed to have committed several murders. Kay and Jay have a short liaison, although Scarpetta tries to keep him at distance. Kay finds out that Lucy is in part involved in this case, since she is investigating a Miami group of weapons and drugs smugglers related to the Chandonnes, the "One Sixty-Fivers".

When they return to Richmond, Virginia, Kay and Marino deal with the case of a woman brutalized and killed in a little shop and with attempts from a member of Dr. Scarpetta's team to sabotage her. Thanks to Marino, they learn that the new police chief, Diane Bray, is behind the sabotage because she wants to gain control of the investigation. Bray is also behind a drugs-smuggling operation, but she is killed with the same modus operandi as the young woman in the shop. It is clear that the killer is at large and trying to kill the people investigating the death of the man in the container.

Dr Scarpetta is in her house when the security alarm is activated. The police come quickly, but they find nothing. Later someone knocks at her door claiming to be a police officer and that someone had reported seeing a prowler. Kay does not realize that le loup garou is fluent in English, and she opens the door. She then realizes that she is under attack. During the struggle, Kay throws a bottle of formalin onto the loup garou's face, which temporarily blinds him.

She then runs out of the house, but falls and fractures her elbow, making her unable to fire her gun. At this time, Lucy and Jo return, and Lucy runs over and points a gun at the assailant's head, with the intention of killing him, but Marino and Kay convince her not to do it.

== Characters ==
- Kay Scarpetta – Chief Medical Examiner of Richmond, Virginia. Consulting pathologist for ATF.
- Lucy Farinelli – Kay's niece. She and Jo went undercover in Miami against the Italian One-Sixty-Fiver cartel. During a takedown, they were ambushed and they had to fight their way out. She killed two of the gangsters and accidentally shot Jo in the leg.
- Jo Sanders – DEA agent. Lucy's lover. She got shot in the leg during the ambush.
- Pete Marino – Captain in the Richmond Police Department. He was transferred from being a homicide detective to a shift commander by Diane Bray.
- Jay Talley – ATF liaison at Interpol, France.
- Chuck Ruffin – Kay's morgue supervisor. According to Kay, he used to be very diligent in his duties. But during the events of the book, he was in cahoots with Diane Bray to mess up Kay's office, to make her look bad. He did this because he had always wanted to be a police officer, and getting into Bray's good books may boost his chances. He was also in liaison with Diane Bray and he stole narcotics, and anti-depressants from the morgue for her, which she sold into the black market.
- Rene Anderson – Homicide detective in Richmond Police Department. She used to work in Vice, and Diane Bray transferred her over to work under her, as she knows where to sell the stolen pills from Chuck Ruffin. She hated working for Bray due to the way she was treated.
- Le Loup Garou – French for The Werewolf, he was the elder brother of Thomas Chandonne, but all his life, he was never exposed to the outside world, for fear of humiliating the Chandonne Crime Family. He had a deformed face, with baby hair, about seven to nine inches long, all over his body. He bathes at the river in both France and Richmond almost every night, in the futile hopes that the water from the rivers may cure him. He was blinded by Formalin during a struggle with Scarpetta.

=== Victims ===
- Seven unnamed women in France – Ages range from twenty-one to fifty-two. All facial structures were broken. There were subdural hematomas, bleeding over the brain and into the chest cavity. There were multiple bite marks. They were all found barefoot, with their clothing ripped open from the waist up.
- Thomas Chandonne – Son of a powerful, rich family in Paris. He was found in a container at a port in Richmond. Heavily decomposed, his cause of death undetermined.
- Kim Luong – Thirty-year-old Asian female. She worked as a convenience store clerk. She was shot in her neck, where she was paralyzed, but still alive, before being brutally beaten and bleeding to death. She was found barefoot, with her blouse and brassiere torn apart.
- Diane Bray – Deputy Chief in Richmond Police Department. A highly attractive woman who seduces her way to the top. She seems to be very rich, staying in a well furnished house and drives a Jaguar, but it was later found out she got her money from peddling narcotics and anti-depressants in the black market. Very unpopular with her colleagues and subordinates, due to her pretentious and malicious character. She was found on the floor of her bedroom, half naked from the waist up, beaten to death by a chipping hammer, a tool used in masonry. She was so badly beaten her facial structures were gone.
