= All That Remains (novel) =

1992 novel by Patricia Cornwell

- First edition
- Author: Patricia Cornwell
- Language: English
- Series: Kay Scarpetta
- Genre: Crime fiction
- Publisher: Scribner
- Publication date: 1992
- Publication place: United States of America
- Media type: Print (hardcover, paperback)
- Pages: 416
- ISBN: 978-0-7434-9153-2
- OCLC: 57708195
- Preceded by: Body of Evidence
- Followed by: Cruel and Unusual

All That Remains is a crime fiction novel by Patricia Cornwell. It is the third book of the Dr. Kay Scarpetta series.

A killer is stalking young couples, and the remains of 8 youngsters have been found dead over a couple of years.

The book is closely based on the Colonial Parkway Killer, a suspected serial killer who is thought to have murdered 8 people in Virginia in the 1980s. In real life the cases are still unsolved though, as described in the true crime documentary Lovers’ Lane Murders from 2021. However, in January 2024, DNA of Alan Wade Wilmer, Sr. was confirmed to match DNA found at one of the Colonial Parkway crime scenes and it was determined that he was responsible for the deaths of at least 2 of the victims. The case is ongoing to confirm Wilmer, Sr. as the official Colonial Parkway Killer. As Cornwell's novel made many believe that the Colonial Parkway murders had been solved, father-daughter true crime authors Blaine Pardoe and Victoria Hester issued their book A special kind of evil in 2017, providing new information from the investigations.

== Plot summary ==
Dr. Kay Scarpetta, chief medical examiner for the Commonwealth of Virginia, is called to the most recent crime scene of a suspected serial killer targeting couples in Richmond. Very few clues are left for investigators, as the victims' bodies have not been located. Scarpetta examines the Jeep belonging to Deborah Harvey, the female victim, finding no evidence of a struggle. Deborah's mother, Pat Harvey, is the National Drug Policy Director and cracking down on organized drug crimes, leading investigators to suspect that her and her boyfriend's disappearances are political in nature.

Stumped, Scarpetta meets with FBI profiler Benton Wesley and Lieutenant Pete Marino, who agree to an open line of communication. She soon reunites with crime reporter Abby Turnbull, who shares her suspicions that something about the killings is being covered up by authorities, and that she is being stalked. Scarpetta initially writes her off until the bodies of Deborah and her boyfriend are found, discovering planted evidence at the scene. Upon questioning Wesley, she learns that the CIA and FBI fear that the killer is a rogue operative stationed at a nearby training camp.

Investigating on her own, Scarpetta discovers a years old case involving a murdered dog that took place within the vicinity of the recent murders and involved the same type of Hydra-Shok ammunition recovered at the dump site. Later, she also learns of two murders from the same timeframe fitting the pattern of the present-day killings where DNA evidence was recovered. While retracing the final night of the two victims' lives, she encounters a suspicious man asking for directions and writes down his license plate number. Upon running the plate number through the police database, she finds that the plate number does not match the make and model of the car she saw. Eventually, she ascertains that the man she saw lifted the plate from another car in long term parking at the local airport before replacing it the next day. Returning to where she first encountered him, she learns he's a local shop owner.

Finding out the man is named Steven Spurrier, she informs Marino and Wesley of his identity and the possible link to the killings. He is eventually arrested after being observed stealing another license plate, giving the police probable cause to search his home and take DNA samples. They are unable to find any definitive link to the killings besides circumstantial evidence and so are forced to release him. Worse still, the DNA evidence from the old crime scene does not match Spurrier. Eventually, Turnbull decides to do an interview with Spurrier in order to vindicate her belief in having been watched by authorities. Following her, Scarpetta and Marino enter Spurrier's apartment and find Turnbull and Spurrier dead at the hands of a vengeful Pat Harvey. At Abby's funeral, Scarpetta speaks with Wesley and reveals that Spurrier's DNA actually did match the DNA found, and that the reason their tests did not conclude such is because he had developed aplastic anemia years earlier and required a bone marrow transplant from his brother, changing the DNA of his blood cells. Afterwards, Scarpetta leaves the cemetery and drives home.

== Characters ==
- Kay Scarpetta – Chief Medical Examiner.
- Benton Wesley – FBI Profiler.
- Pete Marino – Detective Lieutenant in the Richmond Police Department.
- Abby Turnbull – Washington Post reporter.
- Mark James – FBI Special Agent, Dr. Scarpetta's ex-lover from law school
- Pat Harvey – National Drug Policy Director, mother of one of the victims.
- Steven Spurrier – Murderer of the named victims.

=== Victims ===
- Dog Dammit
- Jill Harrington and Elizabeth Mott
- Bruce Philips and Judy Roberts
- Jim Freeman and Bonnie Smyth
- Ben Anderson and Carolyn Bennett
- Susan Wilcox and Mike Martin
- Deborah Harvey and Frederick Cheney
