= Staci Gruber =

American psychiatry professor

Staci Ann Gruber

Academic background
- Education: Tufts University
- Thesis: Stroop performance in schizophrenic and bipolar patients : an fMRI study (2002)
- Website: drstacigruber.com

Staci Ann Gruber is an American neuroscientist who works as an associate professor of psychiatry at Harvard Medical School and as director of the Cognitive and Clinical Neuroimaging Core (CCNC) and of the Marijuana Investigation for Neuroscientific Discovery (MIND) Program. She is known for her work examining substance use and psychiatric conditions using advanced neuroimaging techniques and measures of cognitive performance.

== Education and career ==
In 1991 Gruber received both a B.S. from Tufts University and a B.Mus. from the New England Conservatory of Music. In 1995 she earned an Ed.M. from Harvard Graduate School of Education. She received an M.S. from Tufts University in 2000, and in 2002 went on to earn her Ph.D. from Tufts University where she explored the Stroop effect and differential response of subregions within the cingulate cortex in patients with schizophrenia and bipolar disorder using functional MRI. As of 2022 she is an associate professor of psychiatry at Harvard Medical School and the director of the Marijuana Investigations for Neuroscientific Discovery (MIND) Program at McLean Hospital.

== Research ==
Her current research is dedicated to examining the impact of cannabis and cannabinoids on various health outcomes using comprehensive an longitudinal clinical ratings, cognitive assessments, and magnetic resonance imaging (MRI) techniques, including functional magnetic resonance imaging (fMRI), diffusion tensor imaging (DTI), and magnetic resonance spectroscopy (MRS). Her research is funded and supported by government grants, philanthropy/private donations, and industry.

Gruber's earlier work focused on the application of neurocognitive models and brain imaging to better characterize neurobiological risk factors for psychopathology; she is a co-author on some of the first published findings in patients with psychotic disorders using proton MRS and fMRI techniques. Her work in cannabis initially focused on clarifying the impact of age of onset of recreational cannabis use. Her findings demonstrated that individuals who began using cannabis earlier exhibit poorer performance on measures on cognitive performance and altered patterns of brain structure and function relative to those who began using cannabis later and relative to those who do not use cannabis. In 2014, she founded the Marijuana Investigations for Neuroscientific Discovery (MIND) program which is specifically focused on examining the specific effects of medical cannabis use. MIND examines the impact of medical cannabis using observational, longitudinal, and survey studies, as well as clinical trials of cannabinoid-based products. The Women’s Health Initiative at MIND (WHIM), a cannabis-focused women’s health research program, conducts studies related to sexual/reproductive health and disorders that disproportionately affect women as well as some transgender and non-binary individuals.

In 2017, Gruber stated that with regard to cannabis, "policy has outpaced science". Some of her research was conducted with private funding due to the federal government's placement of cannabis in Schedule I prior to 2026 as having no accepted medical use. Gruber testified before the United States Congress in 2019 as an expert on the psychiatric effects of cannabis; her appearance was said by a cannabis industry newspaper to have provided the "most persuasive and thoughtful testimony" in the hearing, titled "Marijuana and America’s Health: Questions and Issues for Policy Makers". Gruber is an advisor to the Coalition for Cannabis Policy, Education, and Regulation, formed in 2021.

== Selected publications ==
- Gruber, Staci A.; Sagar, Kelly A.; Dahlgren, Mary Kathryn; Racine, Megan; Lukas, Scott E. (2012). "Age of onset of marijuana use and executive function". Psychology of Addictive Behaviors. 26 (3): 496–506. doi:10.1037/a0026269. ISSN 1939-1501. PMC 3345171. PMID 22103843.
- Gruber, Staci A.; Sagar, Kelly A.; Dahlgren, Mary Kathryn; Racine, Megan T.; Smith, Rosemary T.; Lukas, Scott E. (2016). "Splendor in the grass? A pilot study assessing the impact of medical marijuana on executive function". Frontiers in Pharmacology. 7: 355. doi:10.3389/fphar.2016.00355. PMC 5062916. PMID 27790138.
- Sagar, Kelly A.; Gruber, Staci A. (2018). "Marijuana Matters: Reviewing the impact of marijuana on cognition, brain structure and function, & exploring policy implications and barriers to research". International Review of Psychiatry. 30 (3): 251–267. doi:10.1080/09540261.2018.1460334. PMC 6455965. PMID 29966459.
- Sagar, Kelly A.; Dahlgren, Mary Kathryn; Lambros, Ashley M.; Smith, Rosemary T.; El-Abboud, Celine; Gruber, Staci A. (2021). "An observational, longitudinal study of cognition in medical cannabis patients over the course of 12 months of treatment: preliminary results". Journal of the International Neuropsychological Society. 27 (6): 648–660. doi:10.1017/S1355617721000114. PMID 34261553. S2CID 235824932.

== Personal life ==
Gruber and her spouse Patricia Cornwell live in Massachusetts. They wed in 2006. She is a singer, and recorded 1 album as of 2016.
