= Postmortem (novel) =

1990 crime fiction novel by Patricia Cornwell

Post-Mortem
- First edition cover
- Author: Patricia Cornwell
- Language: English
- Series: Kay Scarpetta
- Genre: Crime fiction
- Publication date: 1990
- Publication place: United States
- Media type: Print (hardcover, paperback)
- Pages: 352
- ISBN: 978-0-7434-7715-4
- OCLC: 54687384
- Followed by: Body of Evidence

Postmortem is a 1990 crime fiction novel by author Patricia Cornwell and her debut novel. The first novel of the Kay Scarpetta series, it received the 1991 Edgar Award for Best First Novel.

== Plot summary ==
Dr. Kay Scarpetta, the chief medical examiner of the Commonwealth of Virginia, is called to the scene of a gruesome strangling, the latest in a string of unsolved murders in Richmond. Among the clues left by the killer is a mysterious substance which fluoresces under laser light, which the killer has used to clean the scenes of forensic evidence. Scarpetta and Pete Marino, a detective with the Richmond police, work with FBI profiler Benton Wesley to attempt to piece together the pathology of the killer.

Initial evidence appears to point to the fourth victim's husband, but Scarpetta suspects otherwise despite Marino's insistence. Meanwhile, in her personal life, Scarpetta must deal with the presence of her extremely precocious ten-year-old niece, Lucy, as well as an uncertain romantic relationship with the local Commonwealth's attorney.

Believing that the killer thrives on media attention and hoping to flush him out by provoking his ego, Scarpetta, Wesley, and local investigative reporter Abby Turnbull conspire to release a news story which suggests that the killer has a mental disorder and a distinctive body odor due to a rare metabolic disease. While attempting to find another link between the murders, Scarpetta discovers that all five victims had recently called 9-1-1; she suspects that the killer is a 911 operator and chose his victims based on their voices.

Scarpetta is awakened in the middle of the night by the killer, who has broken into her home. As she attempts to reach for a gun, Marino bursts into her bedroom and shoots the intruder, having realized that the news article would make Scarpetta a likely target. Scarpetta's suspicion proves to be correct; the killer was a 9-1-1 dispatcher.

== Characters in Postmortem ==
- Kay Scarpetta - chief medical examiner.
- Benton Wesley - FBI profiler. "He was FBI right down to his Florsheim shoes, a sharp featured man with prematurely silver hair suggesting a mellow disposition that wasn't there. He was lean and hard and looked like a trial lawyer in his precisely tailored khaki suit and blue silk paisley-printed tie. I couldn't recall ever seeing him in a shirt that wasn't white and lightly starched. He had a master's degree in psychology and had been a high school principal in Dallas before enlisting in the Bureau, where he worked first as a field agent, then undercover in fingering members of the Mafia, before ending up where he'd started, in a sense."
- Dorothy Farinelli - Kay's sister and mother of Lucy that lives in Miami. Her current boyfriend is Ralph and previously she was with Andy, who has a pawn shop. Then she flies to Nevada to marry Jacob Blank. Kay says "my sister should never have been a mother. My sister should never have been Italian."
- Lucy Farinelli - Kay's 10-year-old niece. Described as "a genius, an impossible little holy terror of enigmatic Latin descent whose father died when she was small. She had no one but my only sister, Dorothy, who was too caught up in writing children's books to worry much about her flesh-and-blood daughter."
- Pete Marino - detective sergeant in the Richmond Police Department. Described as "pushing fifty, with a face life had chewed on, and long wisps of greying hair parted low on one side and combed over his balding pate. At least six feet tall, he was bay-windowed from decades of bourbon or beer."
- Norman Tanner - director of Public Safety
- Abby Turnbull - reporter who obtains an inside information on the murders.
- Alvin Amburgey - The county commissioner and Kay's boss. He's from North Carolina and he previously worked in Sacramento, California.
- Bill Boltz - The Commonwealth's attorney. He has a semi-secret relationship with Kay Scarpetta. He enjoys playing tennis.
- Spiro Fortosis - professor of Criminal Psychiatry at University of Virginia. He and Kay know each other from the start of Kay's career.
- Matt Petersen - Lori Petersen's husband. He attended Harvard University as an undergraduate, now he attends university in Charlottesville for a PhD in American Literature; he's also an actor who is playing in Amleto by William Shakespeare, and he's writing a dissertation about Tennessee Williams.
- Roy McCorkle - aka Mr. Nobody; the serial killer, obtaining the information of the dead women through his job as a hotline operator

=== Victims ===
- Brenda Steppe, a teacher at Quinton Elementary. She was from Georgia and she was Baptist. She was also a musician.
- Patty Lewis, a writer who came from a rich family in the Shenandoah Valley
- Cecile Tyler, receptionist in a financial society
- Lori Anne Petersen, a surgeon who wanted to specialize in plastic surgery; she worked at VMC (Virginian Medical Center). She attended Brown College and then Harvard Medical School. Her family lives in Philadelphia.
- Henna Yarborough - sister of Abby Turnbull. She was a professor at the School of Broadcasting. She was from North Carolina, and her ex-husband lives in Chapel Hill, North Carolina.

== Literary significance and criticism ==
Postmortem, Patricia Cornwell's first novel, was published in 1990 following advice from editors at Mysterious Press to dump the then-male central character and to expand the character of Kay Scarpetta. The novel was a major success and won numerous literary awards.

The book is loosely based on the crimes of Timothy Wilson Spencer; Cornwell was working in the OCME at the time of his killings.

== Awards and nominations ==
Patricia Cornwell received the Edgar, Creasey, Anthony and Macavity Awards and the French Prix du Roman d'Adventure for Postmortem.

== Allusions to real life ==
- Richmond, where the story is mostly set
  - Richmond International Airport
  - Ginter Park (Cecile Tyler's home)
  - Main Street (boutique)
  - James Monroe Building (where Amburgey works)
  - Virginia Commonwealth University (Abby Turnbull is near it)
  - West End (Dr. Kay Scarpetta's home)
- Monticello
- Charlottesville, where Lori Petersen's husband attends university to obtain a PhD in American Literature
  - University of Virginia, where Dr. Spiro Fortosis works
- Williamsburg (Dr. Kay Scarpetta and Bill Boltz go here together)
- District of Columbia (Dr. Kay Scarpetta and Bill Boltz go here together)
  - Georgetown University Law School (attended by Dr. Kay Scarpetta)
- Chapel Hill, North Carolina (where Henna's ex-husband lives)
- Baltimore, Johns Hopkins School of Medicine (attended by Dr. Kay Scarpetta)
- New Orleans, French Quarter (summer theater tour of Lori Petersen's husband when he may have committed rape)
- New York (Marino worked here; Dr. Kay Scarpetta's favourite delicatessen shop on West Avenue)
- Cornell University (attended by Dr. Kay Scarpetta)
- Waltham, Massachusetts (similar homicides occurred here)
- Harvard University (attended as an undergraduate by Lori Petersen's husband)
  - Harvard Medical School (attended by Lori Petersen)
- Miami (city where Dr. Kay Scarpetta is born and where she returned after divorce)
  - Miami Seaquarium
  - Bayside Marketplace
  - Coconut Grove
- Coral Gables, Florida (Dr. Kay Scarpetta's friend works here as a judge in a district court)
- Everglades
- Monkey Jungle
- Biscayne Bay
- Hialeah, Florida
- Mecklenburg, Virginia
- Colonial Heights, Virginia
- Fredericksburg, Virginia
- James City County, Virginia
- Chicago (a good friend of Dr. Kay Scarpetta works here)
