= Southern Cross (Cornwell novel) =

1998 novel by Patricia Cornwell

- First edition
- Author: Patricia Cornwell
- Language: English
- Publisher: G. P. Putnam's Sons
- Publication date: 1998
- Publication place: USA
- Preceded by: Hornet's Nest
- Followed by: Isle of Dogs

Southern Cross is a best-selling 1998 novel by Patricia Cornwell in her Andy Brazil series about a reporter for The Charlotte Observer who is also a volunteer cop. It tells the story of Police Chief Judy Hammer, who is sent to Richmond, Virginia, the former capital of the Confederate States of America, to investigate crimes. In a review for The New York Times, Marilyn Stasio suggested the characters are flat.
