= Dust (novel) =

2013 crime novel by Patricia Cornwell

- First edition cover
- Author: Patricia Cornwell
- Language: English
- Series: Kay Scarpetta
- Genre: Crime fiction
- Publisher: G. P. Putnam's Sons
- Publication date: 2013
- Publication place: United States of America
- Media type: Print (hardcover, paperback)
- Pages: 352
- ISBN: 0-399-15757-3
- Preceded by: The Bone Bed
- Followed by: Flesh and Blood

Dust is a 2013 crime novel written by crime author Patricia Cornwell, her 21st book by chronological order in the Kay Scarpetta series. It deals with the murder, of a young girl, which bears peculiar resemblance to numerous preceding deaths and puts the female protagonist, Dr Kay Scarpetta to stare in the face of what could possibly be a deep-seated, high-profile bureaucrat conspiracy and a plot which risks her own life at the mercy of a psychopathic serial killer.

== Plot summary ==
The plot opens with Kay Scarpetta receiving a phone call from Marino informing her about a body, later identified as Gail Shipton, recovered in a field adjoining Massachusetts Information Technology (MIT) campus. As detailed by witnesses, the body was found wrapped in an unusual white cloth, a picture of which brings back to memory a similar scene from 'Capital murders’- a case of triple killings in the capital city Washington- something that Benton had shared with her (albeit without FBI authorization) in lieu of her expertise. Haley Swansen, the boyfriend of the deceased is interrogated and it is revealed that he is transgender. The Capital murders were temporally separated, the first in April and the last two around Thanksgiving, each body clad only in panties belonging to the prior victim and posed in an open field stone's throw away from a rail track. Ed Granby, Benton's boss and head of Boston division, had refused to release key information pertaining to these cases under the pretext 'to avoid replication of this murder-style’.

It is learned that the deceased had filed a $100million lawsuit against her financial advisor : Double-S, a firm with 6 other lawsuits - none of which reached the court since referred to as ‘frivolous’ by CEO Dominic Lombardi - and under probation from SEC (Securities and Exchange Commission) for irregularities.

Gail Shipton's body, upon close inspection by Kay Scarpetta, was found to be wrapped in a white cloth made up of a low-stretch synthetic fabric, with conspicuous absence of injury marks (not even those incurred from defending oneself) except for pinpoint conjunctival hemorrhages, covered in fluorescent glitter and characteristically clad only in an ill-fitting panty. Benton claims that this scenario bears striking resemblance to the Capital Murders and theorizes that the killer is audacious, learned from a fact that he purposefully left the tool-box containing the cutter (to gain entry through the locked field-gate) close to the crime scene.

Benton confides in Kay that a person named Martin Lagos, possibly dead, has been announced as being responsible for the triple murders. The accused's DNA had matched the blood sample from the 3rd victim's panties which Kay herself had previously confirmed to be menstrual specimen that had matched to the 2nd victim. Going by logic that the killer dresses each subsequent victim in his prior victim's panty, Kay begins to think that the DNA sample could have been tampered to frame the accused on purpose.

In a twist of events, the CFC is rocked by the news of 3 additional murders which have occurred in the Double-S firm. Haley Swanson, Gail Shipton's boyfriend, is said to have been seen escaping the premises, identified not by his face but by the same hoodie that he was wearing (while previously being interrogated in light of Gail Shipton's murder.) Upon reaching the latest crime scene the 3 bodies are identified as belonging to Dominic Lombardi, his secretary and the 3rd, to everyone's surprise, Haley Swanson himself! The person who absconded with his hoodie who also happens to be the serial killer is still at large at that moment.

Detailed search about the reason why Martin Lagos was framed leads them to Daniel Mrse, Martin's friend. Martin’ s mom who worked as a curator at the white house was found dead in her bath-tub (in 1996), a definite murder scene made to look like an accidental death. But with evidence strongly pointing towards Daniel Mrse, Kay through phone records, realizes that Dr Geist had a phonic conversation with Ed Granby prior to the body being discovered, prompting her to doubt the intent of the phone call.

Now, certain of Ed Granby's involvement, a hacked email reveals that money has exchanged hands to conceal & falsify the identify of the killer. The killer himself is later identified as Daniel Mrse - the biological son of Dominic Lombardi and thus explains the father's repeated attempts to cover up the murders.

Daniel Mrse is tracked down to Florida, working in a circus. A raid of his vanity car reveals the presence of face masks made of clay, representing each of the women that he had murdered and also providing the reason for the fluorescent glitter. Further, the temporal gap in the murders coincides with the circus traveling to Cambridge and Washington.

== Reviews ==
The Guardian describes the heroine Kay Scarpetta as 'there is something different, something tougher and more go-getting, about the now-gun-toting Scarpetta on this, her 21st outing. Unrepentant and unafraid, this time she is not only on the trail of a killer, she is also fighting to protect her husband as he falls victim to deep-seated corruption, and making it very clear that she is not a woman to be overlooked or underestimated'.

The Boston Globe put it as: 'Provides the standard - read excellent- Patricia Cornwell fare'.
