= Scarpetta (novel) =

2008 novel by Patricia Cornwell

- First edition
- Author: Patricia Cornwell
- Language: English
- Series: Kay Scarpetta Mysteries
- Genre: Crime novel
- Publisher: G. P. Putnam's Sons
- Publication date: December 2, 2008
- Publication place: United States
- Media type: Print (Hardcover, Paperback)
- Pages: 512 (first edition, hardback)
- ISBN: 0-399-15516-3 (first edition, hardback)
- OCLC: 213308424
- Preceded by: Book of the Dead
- Followed by: The Scarpetta Factor

Scarpetta is a novel by Patricia Cornwell. It was published in 2008 by G. P. Putnam's Sons. It is the sixteenth book of Cornwell's popular Kay Scarpetta series.

== Reception ==
Kirkus Reviews wrote that "the title perfectly suits a challenging mystery that’s only a pendant to the endless soap opera revolving around a heroine." Publishers Weekly called the book "plodding", with "a plot full of holes and frustrating red herrings" that fell short of the series' usual quality. Laura Wilson, writing in The Guardian, called the novel "formulaic and stale", with "leaden, repetitive" prose that is, at its worst, "risible"; she added that the series' protagonists had descended into caricature.
