= The Last Precinct (novel) =

2000 novel by Patricia Cornwell

- First edition
- Author: Patricia Cornwell
- Language: English
- Series: Kay Scarpetta
- Genre: Crime fiction
- Publisher: G. P. Putnam's Sons
- Publication date: 2000
- Publication place: United States
- Media type: Print (hardcover, paperback)
- Pages: 449
- ISBN: 0-399-14625-3
- OCLC: 47275809
- Preceded by: Black Notice
- Followed by: Blow Fly

The Last Precinct is a crime novel by American author Patricia Cornwell, the eleventh in her Dr. Kay Scarpetta series.

== Plot summary ==
Following the death of Diane Bray and an apparent attack on Kay Scarpetta by Jean-Baptiste Chandonne in her own house at the end of Black Notice, The Last Precinct concentrates on discovering the full story behind Chandonne's killings. Kay Scarpetta is also under suspicion for the killing of Bray, due to their known rivalry and public confrontations. Torn between a desire to clear her name and the instinct of a wounded animal to turn against even its would-be rescuers, Kay sifts through the forensic evidence that seems to link Chandonne to past events in her life, up to and including the murder of her lover, Benton Wesley. A major new character is Jaime Berger, from the District Attorney's Office in New York, who believes Chandonne killed a woman in New York two years' before his arrival in Virginia. Kay must examine her own fears, misconceptions, and anything-but-altruistic motives to accept working with another competent woman.

== Litigation surrounding The Last Precinct ==
Dr. Leslie Sachs, author of The Virginia Ghost Murders (1998), claimed to see similarities between his novel and Cornwell's novel The Last Precinct. In 2000 he sent letters to Cornwell's publisher, started a page on the World Wide Web, and placed stickers on his novel in order to claim that Cornwell was committing plagiarism. Cornwell successfully obtained a preliminary injunction against Sachs. The court ruled that his claims were baseless, and he was prevented from placing the stickers on his book. The court also shut his website down for false advertising and required booksellers to remove the stickers that were already on books.

Sachs left the country so that he could escape the injunction. He continues to charge that Cornwell plagiarized his work and used her influence to subvert justice.
