= Cause of Death (novel) =

1996 novel by Patricia Cornwell

- First edition
- Author: Patricia Cornwell
- Language: English
- Series: Kay Scarpetta
- Genre: Crime
- Publisher: G.P. Putnam's Sons
- Publication date: 1996
- Publication place: United States
- Media type: Print (hardback & paperback)
- Pages: 340
- ISBN: 0-399-14146-4
- OCLC: 77537049
- Preceded by: From Potter's Field
- Followed by: Unnatural Exposure

Cause of Death is a crime fiction novel by Patricia Cornwell. It is the seventh book in the Dr. Kay Scarpetta series.

== Characters ==
- Kay Scarpetta - Chief Medical Examiner
- Lucy Farinelli - Kay's niece
- Pete Marino - Police Captain in the Richmond Police Department.
- Benton Wesley - Kay's love interest, despite being married. FBI profiler. He was the unit chief of the Bureau's Criminal Investigative Analysis Program (CIAP).
- Dr. Phillip Mant - Forensic pathologist and Kay's deputy chief for the Tidewater District.
- Captain Green - Naval Investigative Service. Described by Kay as "typical of weak people with power or rank. He had done his best to scare me off, and when that had accomplished nothing he had decided we would be friends.

=== Victims ===
- Ted Eddings - Thirty-two years old, brown hair, blue eyes. An award-winning investigative reporter for the Associated Press. Kay referred to him as "never been shy or passive during professional encounters" and finds him quite confident and charming. His body was found in the Elizabeth River, tethered to a compressor which pumps surface breathing air down to him. He was killed by breathing in cyanide gas through the compressor.
- Danny Webster - He was found on Libby Hill Park, Richmond, Virginia, in a secluded area called Sugar Bottom, half on his back, half on his side in an awkward tangle of arms and legs. A large puddle of blood was beneath his head. He was killed by a single gunshot to the head, using a special type of ammunition called a Black Talon.

=== Other Deaths ===
- Joel Hand - Leader of the New Zionists. He fell into the water used to cool the nuclear assemblies in the power station. Unable to swim, he swallowed a huge amount of radioactive water, which led to multiple organ failure.
