= Unnatural Exposure =

1997 novel by Patricia Cornwell

Unnatural Exposuree
- First edition
- Author: Patricia Cornwell
- Language: English
- Series: Kay Scarpetta
- Genre: Crime fiction
- Publisher: G. P. Putnam's Sons
- Publication date: 1997
- Publication place: United States
- Media type: Print (hardcover, paperback)
- Pages: 367
- ISBN: 0-399-14285-1
- OCLC: 39285687
- Preceded by: Cause of Death
- Followed by: Point of Origin

Unnatural Exposure is a crime fiction novel by Patricia Cornwell. It is the eighth book in the Dr. Kay Scarpetta series. The story is set in Richmond, Virginia and Ireland.

== Plot summary ==
Virginia Chief Medical Examiner Kay Scarpetta has a bloody puzzle on her hands: five headless, limbless cadavers in Ireland, plus four similar victims in a landfill back home. Is a serial butcher loose in Virginia? That's what the panicked public thinks, thanks to a local TV reporter who got the leaked news from Scarpetta's rival, Investigator Percy Ring. But this is no run-of-the-mill serial killer. A shadowy figure has plans involving mutant smallpox, mass murder, and messing with Scarpetta's mind by e-mailing her hot naked photos of the murder scenes, along with cryptic AOL chat-room messages. Central to the plot is the case of Janet Parker, the last person known to have died of smallpox, which she contracted in 1978 due to a lab accident in Birmingham, England, after the disease was eradicated in the wild. Cornwell makes the villain a junior employee of the lab at the time who was made a scapegoat for the accident and whose career was blighted as a result. This provides the plot with a credible source for the virus and a motive for the central crime.

The emergency response is complicated by a Federal budget freeze, when all "non-essential" government employees are sent home. Cornwell says in an introduction to a 2008 reprint that a decade ago the idea of a deliberate virus threat seemed fanciful and improbable, and she got more access to government facilities like the CDC for researching the book than she would have got a decade later. She said that her "modus operandi when I write a book is to ask my characters where they are and what they are doing. Then I focus on an image. From that image comes the story .... ".

== Characters in Unnatural Exposure ==
- Kay Scarpetta - Chief Medical Examiner.
- Benton Wesley - FBI Profiler. Head of the Child Abduction Serial Killer Unit.
- Lucy Farinelli - Kay's niece, an FBI agent. Technical expert attached to Engineering Research Facility (ERF) and Hostage Rescue Team (HRT).
- Pete Marino - Commander of the Richmond Police Department's homicide squad.
- Keith Pleasants - Landfill worker who discovered an unidentified victim. Constantly harassed by Inspector Percy Ring, who thinks he is the killer of the unidentified woman, which is untrue.
- Inspector Percy Ring - Nephew to the secretary of public safety in Virginia. Pretentious man who always jumps to conclusions with dubious allegations, just so he can solve his cases. His aim is to climb higher in the police hierarchy, with no real dedication to police work.

=== Victims ===
- Unnamed White Female - Aged sixty-five to eighty. Mother of Phyllis Crowder. She was decapitated low on the cervical spine, arms and legs severed. She had been dismembered by cutting straight through the strong bones of the humerus and femur. Probably hit in the head that resulted in a basilar skull fracture. It was later discovered she was infected with a smallpox-like virus, before being killed, and she was just a copycat killing to the five unidentified victims in Dublin, Ireland and the four unidentified victims in Virginia.
- Lila Pruitt - White female. Found in bed at her home in Tangier Island. She was covered with pustules, gray and hard like pearls, her toothless mouth caved in, and dyed red hair wild. Also killed by a mutant smallpox virus.
- Unnamed Mother and Daughter - Killed by a mutant smallpox virus. Also lives in Tangier Island.
- Unnamed Male - A drifter and petty criminal who broke into 'Phyllis Crowder's smallpox lab in the caravan; she killes him with her shotgun at close range, but too far away to be a suicide. But she stays online to AOL this time long enough for the call to be traced to the caravan at a Maryland campground.
- Wingo - Kay's lab assistant. Killed by smallpox mutant when Phyllis Crowder delivered a smallpox contaminated facial spray to his house. He was HIV positive.

=== Other deaths ===
- Five Unidentified victims in Dublin, Ireland - Their spines were cut horizontally through the caudal aspect of the fifth cervical vertebral body. Arms and legs severed through the joints. Victims are a racial mix, estimated ages between eighteen and thirty-five. Heads and limbs were never found, and all were discovered in private landfills.
- Four Unidentified victims in Virginia - Modus operandi of killer same as Dublin cases. Varied races.
- Dr Phyllis Crowder - English microbiologist at the Medical College of Virginia, where she claims she was not promoted because she was a woman. She used to be a junior staff at the Birmingham, England labs which held the smallpox virus samples back in 1978. She was held responsible for the death of a scientist due to exposure to smallpox. She began plotting her revenge by splicing monkeypox with smallpox, just so she can take her revenge. She died 21 days after she was arrested. She was online at an AOL chatroom as "deadoc" which she used to taunt Scarpetta (who recognises her dining room from photos sent to her via AOL).
