= From Potter's Field =

1995 novel by Patricia Cornwell

- First edition
- Author: Patricia Cornwell
- Language: English
- Series: Kay Scarpetta
- Genre: Crime fiction
- Publisher: Scribner
- Publication date: 1995
- Publication place: United States
- Media type: Print (hardcover, paperback)
- Pages: 416
- ISBN: 0-684-19598-4
- OCLC: 35005608
- Preceded by: The Body Farm
- Followed by: Cause of Death

From Potter's Field is a 1995 crime fiction novel by American writer Patricia Cornwell. It is the sixth book in the Dr. Kay Scarpetta series.

== Plot summary ==
The story begins as a rotten Christmas for Scarpetta: Temple Gault has struck again, leaving a naked, apparently homeless woman shot in Central Park on Christmas Eve; Scarpetta, as the FBI's consulting pathologist, is called in. Later, a transit cop is found shot in a subway tunnel, and, back home in Richmond, Virginia, the body of a crooked local sheriff is delivered to Scarpetta's own morgue by the elusive, brilliant Gault. The normally unflappable Scarpetta finds herself hyperventilating and nearly shooting her own niece. In the end, some ingenious forensic detective work and a visit to the killer's agonized family set up a high-tech, difficult to follow, climax back in the New York City Subway, which Gault treats as the Phantom of the Opera did the sewers of Paris.

== Characters ==
- Kay Scarpetta - Chief Medical Examiner.
- Benton Wesley - FBI Profiler.
- Lucy Farinelli - Kay's niece. FBI trainee and programmer at the Engineering Research Facility at the FBI Academy, Quantico.
- Pete Marino - Captain in the Richmond Police Department. Started dating a woman named Molly since Thanksgiving.
- Paul Tucker - Colonel, Chief of Police, Richmond. He had been a basketball star at the University of Maryland and a finalist for a Rhodes scholarship. He was extremely fit, exceptionally bright and a graduate of the FBI's National Academy.
- Frances Penn - Commander of the New York City Transit Police. A woman very much alike Kay, when she said to her, personal relationships are your nemesis because you can't have a good one by overachieving. You can't earn a happy love affair or be promoted into a happy marriage. And if someone you care about has a problem, you think you should have prevented it and most certainly fix it. When Kay asked about her inquisition, she mentioned that, "Your story is my story. There are many women like us. Yet we never seem to get together."
- Carrie Grethen - Accomplice to Gault. She had been Lucy's programming partner and intimate friend. Drug addict, she helped Temple Gault murder Lamont Brown.

=== Victims ===
- A mutt puppy - It belonged to Rachael when she and Temple Gault were five years old. The puppy disappeared and that night Jayne woke up to find it dead in her bed.
- Rachael Jayne Gault - Originally named Jane Doe because her identity could not be determined. From Potter's Field. Killed at Cherry Hill in Central Park, New York. Before she met her demise, she was dressed in a man's topcoat and an Atlanta Braves baseball cap. Her head was shaved. She was most likely forced to strip and walk barefoot to the fountain, where she was shot at close range in the right temple. There were excised areas of skin from her inner thighs and left shoulder, and her naked body was propped against the fountain. She is deduced to be Temple Gault's twin sister, by means of dental records: she had gold-foil fillings in her teeth.
- Officer Jimmy Davila - Officer in the New York City Transit Police Homeless Unit. Known to be "a good officer. He was so helpful, never complained, and his smile. He brightened a room. He was twenty-seven, with only a year's service. He was found on his back, his winter jacket unzipped, revealing the stiff shape of a bulletproof vest beneath a navy blue commando sweater. He had been shot between his eyes with the .38 revolver on top of his chest.
- Sheriff Lamont Brown - Sheriff in the Richmond Police Department. Also known as Sheriff Santa for collecting money and giving toys to poor children, he is a corrupt officer who snorted cocaine and probably stole half of what was donated to him each year. His body was personally delivered by Temple Gault to the morgue at three in the morning. His head was covered by a black plastic garbage bag that had been tied around the neck with a shoelace. He was clothed in blood-soaked pajamas and wore a thick gold bracelet and Rolex watch. Peeking out of the breast pocket of his pajama top was what appeared to be a pink envelope.
- Detective Jakes - Killed by Temple Gault after Kay discovered Sheriff Brown's body had been delivered by him. Marino and Kay were just outside the morgue at the time. When Marino called for him and waited more than twenty minutes without any reply, he decided to go look for him. He was eventually discovered inside the crematorium oven. When Kay and Marino opened the oven door, they discovered that the body burning on the tray inside had not been there long. The clothes had incinerated, but not the leather cowboy boots. The boots were smoking on Detective Jakes's feet as flames licked the skin off his bones and inhaled his hair. X-rays revealed he had received a crushing blow to the chest prior to death. Ribs and sternum were fractured, his aorta torn, and a STAT carbon monoxide showed he had no longer been breathing when he was set on fire.
- Detective Maier - He was found by Kay at the moment she saw Temple Gault holding Lucy hostage. Detective Maier was welded to the third rail of southbound tracks, hands and teeth clenched as electricity flowed through his dead body.

=== Other deaths ===
- Temple Brooks Gault - Serial killer. Nephew of a general officer and Medal of Honor winner. Described by Kay as having many shades of hair. With sharp features and eyes as pale blue as a malamute's (This is an error on the author's part as malamutes do not have blue eyes, only varying shades of brown. A Siberian Husky can have blue eyes, but not malamutes). He enjoyed military clothing or designs suggestive of it, such as the boots and the long black leather coat he was seen wearing in New York. His first encounter with the criminal justice system had been less than five years ago when he was drinking White Russians in a bar in Abingdon, Virginia. An intoxicated truck driver, who did not like effeminate males, began to harass Gault, who had a black belt in karate. Without a word, Gault smiled his strange smile. He got up, spun around and kicked the man in the head. Half a dozen off-duty state troopers happened to be at a nearby table, which was perhaps the only reason Gault was caught and charged with manslaughter. He also held a great animosity towards his twin sister Rachael Jayne Gault. According to his father, "from day one Temple wanted to squash her like a bug. He was cruel." He was killed by snipers after having an artery slashed by Kay using the dissecting knife he'd used to hold Lucy hostage. He fell on the railway track after being shot and was crushed by an oncoming train.
