= Marcella Farinelli Fierro =

Medical examiner and forensic pathologist

Dr. Marcella Farinelli Fierro (born 1941) is a medical examiner and forensic pathologist. She was the former chief medical examiner of Virginia, appointed in 1994 and serving in this position until her retirement in 2008. She was the ninth woman certified in forensic pathology by the American Board of Pathology. After she retired, Fierro served as an educator, mentor, and adviser.

== Early life ==
Marcella Farinelli Fierro decided to pursue a Doctor of Medicine in forensic pathology at the State of University of New York at Buffalo School of Medicine after she graduated cum laude in biology from D’Youville College in Buffalo, New York in 1962.

== Career ==
After earning her degree in 1966, Fierro pursued an internship and residency at Ottawa Civic Hospital in Ontario, Canada followed by residencies in pathology at the Cleveland (Ohio) Clinic Educational Foundation and at Virginia Commonwealth University.

Fierro became chief resident in Pathology at the Virginia Commonwealth University and held a fellowship in forensic pathology in the Department of Legal Medicine at the Medical College of Virginia/Virginia Commonwealth University in Richmond from 1973 to 1974. After receiving board of certification in Anatomic, Clinical and Forensic Pathology, Fierro acquired the title of chief medical examiner of Virginia, the state's highest position in forensic science, in 1994.

Fierro was a member of faculty of the Department of Legal Medicine and Pathology at Medical College of Virginia Commonwealth University beginning in 1973, and was a clinical professor of pathology at the University of Virginia, Charlottesville from 1983 to 1992 and also in 1999 to 2002. Fierro served as a staff pathologist at Richmond's Medical College of Virginia Hospitals from 1975 to 1992 and then returned to academia as a professor of pathology at East Carolina School of Medicine in Greenville from 1992 to 1994.

In 1979 Fierro began serving on the board of editors for the American Journal of Forensic Medicine and Pathology.

In 1983 Fierro began working as a consultant to the Federal Bureau of Investigation's Task Force on National Crime Investigation Center, Unidentified Persons and Missing Persons Files, Washington D.C.

Fierro served as a member of the American Medical Association and the International Association for Identification, a Fellow of the American Society of Clinical Pathologists, the College of American Pathologists, and the American Academy of Forensic Sciences and was a former president of the National Association of Medical Examiners.

She was awarded the Lifetime Achievement Award in 2001 from the School of Medicine and Biomedical Sciences Medical Alumni Association.

On December 31, 2007, Fierro retired as Chief Medical Examiner for the state of Virginia, after 30 years of service to the state. Among the guests in attendance at her retirement party was crime novelist Patricia Cornwell, who had known Fierro since 1984, when Cornwell began interviewing Fierro for her research into the profession, which would serve as the basis of Cornwell's Dr. Kay Scarpetta, the fictional heroine of Cornwell's crime novels.
