= Blow Fly (novel) =

2003 novel by Patricia Cornwell

- Author: Patricia Cornwell
- Language: English
- Series: Kay Scarpetta Mysteries
- Genre: Crime
- Publisher: G. P. Putnam's Sons
- Publication date: 2003
- Publication place: United States
- Media type: Print (hardback & paperback)
- ISBN: 978-0-399-15089-0
- OCLC: 52891481
- Dewey Decimal: 813/.54 22
- LC Class: PS3553.O692 B576 2003
- Preceded by: The Last Precinct
- Followed by: Trace

Blow Fly is a crime fiction novel by Patricia Cornwell, the twelfth book of the Dr. Kay Scarpetta series.

== Plot summary ==
After resigning as Virginia's Chief Medical Examiner and surviving the events in The Last Precinct, Kay Scarpetta leaves Richmond, Virginia, to relocate to Florida. There, she begins working as a private forensic consultant, with her initial casework focusing on the forensic significance of blow flies on human remains.

But her past will not let her rest, and her grief for Benton Wesley continues to grow, not diminish, as does the rage within Lucy, her niece. Then the architect of her changed fortunes contacts her from his cell on death row: deformed, blinded by Scarpetta's own actions, incarcerated in Texas' strongest prison, Jean-Baptiste Chandonne still has the ability to terrify. But, unknown to Scarpetta, there are other forces behind the wolfman's apparent actions, invisibly shepherding her and those closest to her towards eliminating those who threaten them all. It is all orchestrated by the one man in her life who knows every nuance of her soul.

In Szczecin, Poland, Lucy and a colleague apparently commit a premeditated murder, using blow-fly larvae to alter the perceived time of death. The novel then ends with the killing of four further people by Scarpetta's associates.

== Literary significance & criticism ==
Some reviewers considered this to be a "highly suspenseful read in which surprises explode and the characters move to another level of believability." One finds that the book,"while not for the squeamish... is a tremendous read." Others, however, as also noted in reviews for later books in the series, such as Trace, considered it to be disappointing. Gail Pennington of the St Louis Post Dispatch states that "even the most ardent Cornwell fans may reluctantly realize that enthusiasm for the Scarpetta series is mainly a relic of books past."

In Blow Fly, we see a change in narrative style from the first-person narration of Kay herself to a third-person, omniscient, narrator. This device not only allows for more characters and their perspectives to come to the fore, but also marks a significant transformation in the way that the novels represent the criminal. Where previously the criminal's mind was never made available to the reader—thus intensifying their "otherness"—the later novels allow space to explore their point of view and uncover their motivations.

This approach does, however, come in for criticism. One reviewer notes that "Blow Fly is written in 124 chapters, some as short as a few paragraphs, with close to a dozen shifting points of view. Everyone, it seems, has something to describe, and every bit of description gets equal weight, from a new outfit bought at Saks to a highly technical selection of handguns to the leisurely, sexually charged torture of a young woman. ("Every female character in "Blow Fly" is either miserable or doomed, adding weight to the frequent argument that Cornwell is not just anti-feminist, but anti-woman altogether.")

== Allusions/references to actual history, geography and current science ==
- Mostly set in Richmond, Virginia, and Miami, Florida. Short scenes set in Knoxville, Tennessee, a bayou near Baton Rouge, Louisiana, a Texas prison, and Szczecin, Poland.
