= The Body Farm (novel) =

1994 novel by Patricia Cornwell

- First edition
- Author: Patricia Cornwell
- Language: English
- Series: Kay Scarpetta
- Genre: Crime fiction
- Publisher: Scribner
- Publication date: 1994
- Publication place: United States
- Media type: Print (hardback & paperback)
- ISBN: 0-684-19597-6
- OCLC: 43377603
- Preceded by: Cruel and Unusual
- Followed by: From Potter's Field

The Body Farm is a crime fiction novel by Patricia Cornwell. It is the fifth book in the Dr. Kay Scarpetta series.

== Plot summary ==
Fictional sleuth Kay Scarpetta is called in to assist in the investigation of the brutal murder of 11-year-old Emily Steiner in rural North Carolina – a murder resembling the handiwork of a serial killer who has eluded the FBI for years. Scarpetta is joined by her ingenious and rebellious niece, Lucy, an FBI intern with a promising future in Quantico's computer engineering facility. To help with the investigation, Scarpetta turns to a clandestine research facility in Tennessee known as "The Body Farm".

== Characters in The Body Farm ==
- Kay Scarpetta – Chief Medical Examiner.
- Benton Wesley – FBI Profiler. He started having romantic relationships with Kay, despite being married.
- Lucy Farinelli – Kay's niece. On internship at the FBI Academy, Quantico. Had a romantic lesbian relationship with Carrie Grethen. However, she was sabotaged, although she was subsequently cleared of any wrongdoing. Got into a car accident, under the influence of alcohol, in which Kay's Mercedes-Benz E500 was wrecked. It was later revealed that she was run off the road by Denesa Steiner.
- Pete Marino – Captain in the Richmond Police Department.
- Lieutenant Hershel Mote – Lieutenant in the Black Mountain Police Department. Was at Max Ferguson's house, after finding Max dead, he had chest pains and dizziness, which will later on lead to a heart attack.
- Dr. Thomas Katz – Forensic Scientist the Body Farm. He also was an expert in time of death, which he researched just as diligently with ways and means that were not commonly known to the hoi polloi, such as insect activity. His laboratory is called The Body Farm. Based on real-life Forensic Anthropologist, William M. Bass
- Carrie Grethen – Lucy's romantic interest at Quantico, who was using Lucy's identity to gain entry into classified areas, in order to avoid suspicion. Later associated with Temple Gault.

=== Victims ===
- Emily Steiner – 11-year-old girl. Murdered in Black Mountain, North Carolina. Her body was naked. Upon close inspection by the Buncombe County medical examiner, it was determined she had been sexually assaulted, and had large dark shiny patches on her upper thighs, upper chest, and shoulder, which were areas of missing flesh, along with a small round patch on one of her buttocks. She also had been gagged and bound with blaze-orange duct tape, her cause of death a single small-caliber gunshot wound to the back of the head.
- Max Ferguson – State Bureau of Investigation Agent. When Kay arrived, he was on his back, the size-D cups of a long-line black brassiere stuffed with socks that smelled faintly of musk. The pair of black nylon panties he had put on before he died had been pulled down around his hairy knees, and a condom still clung limply to his penis. He asphyxiated on a hangman's noose, and was cut loose by Mote the moment he found him.
- Socks – Emily's kitten, a stray kitten that Emily started feeding. She called her Socks because she was pure black except for perfect white paws. It died of a broken neck.

=== Other deaths ===
- A 14-year-old boy, in London – Modus operandi similar to Eddie Heath's case in Cruel and Unusual. There were excised flesh on his body. Gunshot to the head, body displayed. He was not killed by Denesa Steiner, but his killer was not revealed in the later books.
- Denesa Steiner – Emily's mother. Killer of Emily and Max Ferguson. She was killed by Kay after she barged into the room and saw Denesa sitting placidly on the edge of the bed where Marino lay, a plastic trash bag over his head and taped around his neck. She grabbed Marino's pistol off the table, and this prompted Kay to fire "Marino's Winchester rifle, which she got from his car, and subsequently killed her."

== Major themes ==
The hunt for the killer of 11-year-old Emily Steiner.

== Allusions/references to actual history, geography and current science ==
The story is set around Lake Tomahawk in Black Mountain, North Carolina.

The novel, and its title, were inspired by the University of Tennessee Anthropological Research Facility, which is used in the study of forensic anthropology, in particular human decomposition. The facility is commonly known as The Body Farm and is located a few miles south of Knoxville, Tennessee, behind the University of Tennessee Medical Center. The facility was founded by anthropologist Dr. William M. Bass in 1981, after he found that no such facilities existed that specifically studied decomposition.
