= Kay Scarpetta =

- First appearance: Postmortem
- Created by: Patricia Cornwell
- Portrayed by: Nicole Kidman; Rosy McEwen

In-universe information
- Gender: Female
- Occupation: Medical Examiner
- Nationality: American

Kay Scarpetta is a fictional character inspired by former Virginia Chief Medical Examiner Marcella Farinelli Fierro. She is the protagonist in a series of crime novels written by Patricia Cornwell noted for their use of recent forensic technology.

The name "Scarpetta" is a diminutive, meaning "little shoe", as revealed in the 2009 novel The Scarpetta Factor, which points out that the underlying pun is similar to "Caligula", which means "little boot" in Latin. The novel features a website named Caligula, which is involved indirectly in the murder of a young woman.

== Fictional character biography ==
Family background: Born in Miami, Florida, on June 12, 1954, the first child of Kay and Dorothy ("Doro") Scarpetta, who had both emigrated from Verona, Italy. She is of Italian descent on both sides of her family. As a young girl she watched her father Kay die from leukemia.

Education: Johns Hopkins School of Medicine, Baltimore, and Georgetown Law School. She has certificates, including from Cornell University, Johns Hopkins University and Georgetown University.

Employment: In the early novels Scarpetta works in Richmond as the Chief Medical Examiner for the Commonwealth of Virginia and as a member of faculty at Virginian Medical Center (VMC). She resigns after the events of The Last Precinct, moving to Florida to become a private forensic consultant. Scarpetta returns to Virginia in Trace, convincing herself that she was fired from her position at the request of her replacement, Dr Joel Marcus. In Predator Scarpetta becomes the head of the National Forensic Academy in Hollywood, Florida, a private institution founded by her wealthy niece, Lucy. In The Book of the Dead Scarpetta has relocated as a freelance forensic examiner/expert to Charleston, South Carolina. In Scarpetta (2008) she has moved to Massachusetts, where she is an M.E., but she and Benton also share an apartment in New York City. In The Scarpetta Factor (2009) she is working full-time and Wesley is working part-time in New York.

Appearance: Blonde and a sharp dresser, with a wardrobe of designer suits.

Character: A perfectionist and workaholic. She loves to cook, particularly Italian food, and makes everything from scratch, including pasta and bread. She has a beautiful home built to her specifications, including a restaurant kitchen. She drives a Mercedes, which she replaces often.

Relationships: Married to Tony Benedetti while at law school. Divorced about 6 years before the beginning of the first novel, set in 1986, Postmortem. Subsequent on-again, off-again relationship with Mark James, who dies in a bombing in a London Tube station (in the novel Cruel and Unusual). Third relationship with Benton Wesley, who is supposedly killed in Point of Origin but later reappears. In 2007's The Book of the Dead, Scarpetta and Wesley become engaged, and they are married by the opening of 2008's Scarpetta.

== Recurring characters in the series ==
=== Lucy Farinelli ===
Lucy is the only child of Kay's flighty sister, Dorothy. She first appears at age 10 in Postmortem. Lucy has a natural aptitude for computers. Although frequently sulky in her adolescence, she shapes herself into a very strong woman with Kay's model to follow. She enters the FBI at 18 but is not well accepted owing to her sexual orientation and her genius IQ. Lucy has several relationships (with women) in the course of the series. She also has several one-night stands—even a few with men—and engages in risky behavior with firearms and high-speed vehicles. At one point she gets drunk and wrecks Kay's new Mercedes-Benz. She also gets into a firefight between two helicopters, using handheld firearms.

Early in her FBI career Lucy is seduced by Carrie Grethen, a sociopathic coworker who is in cahoots with Temple Gault, a cold-blooded murderer who had crossed Kay's path a few years before. The relationship haunts Lucy and those who are close to her in several books. Lucy becomes a self-made millionaire by the age of 25 by building and selling internet search engines—years before Google. She invests some of her earnings in her own private investigating firm, The Last Precinct, located in New York City, and later in a forensic training center, The National Forensic Academy, in Hollywood, Florida, which employs her Aunt Kay and Pete Marino. She has a penchant for buying expensive machines like helicopters, Ferraris, and motorcycles. She also purchases a private jet, for which she earns a private pilot license.

In Predator, Lucy is diagnosed with a benign brain tumor that alters her physical appearance and seems also to modify her personality. In The Book of the Dead she is undergoing treatment; in later books the disease is not mentioned. In 2007's The Book of the Dead she almost kills Pete Marino when she discovers he has attacked and almost raped her Aunt Kay. In Scarpetta and The Scarpetta Factor, Lucy is back in New York running her own company again and is in a relationship with the New York District Attorney Jaime Berger.

In Blow Fly, Lucy helps murder Rocco Caggiano, Pete Marino's renegade son, in a Polish hotel. By Autopsy, she had teamed up with Marino in a private investigation company.

Over the course of the series, the characters do not age consistently, e.g. Kay Scarpetta is around age 40 at the beginning of the series, meaning she is 30 years older than Lucy. However, by the time of the novel Blow Fly, Lucy is almost 30, while Scarpetta is still only 46. The table below shows how Lucy ages.

Book	Year	Age
Postmortem	1990	10
All That Remains	1992	16
Cruel & Unusual	1993	17
The Body Farm	1994	21
From Potter's Field	1995	21
Cause of Death	1996	23
The Last Precinct	2000	28
Blow Fly	2003	30

=== Pete Marino ===
Pete Marino grew up in Bayonne, New Jersey. He started his police career in New York City. In the early books, he is a homicide detective for the Richmond police department, eventually rising to the rank of captain. He is an excellent detective and works for many years with Dr. Scarpetta, with whom he is secretly in love. He eventually joins her at the National Forensic Academy after retiring from the police force in Predator. Marino seems to have problems with women through the whole Scarpetta series, stemming from a prior marriage to Doris which resulted in a son, Rocky, who becomes a lawyer for a drug cartel and died after an attempt to kill his father. Throughout the series Marino plays a great part in the upbringing of Lucy, although he has issues with her sexuality.

In Book of the Dead, Marino reacts badly to news of Scarpetta's engagement to Benton Wesley, and after getting drunk and under the influence of a testosterone drug, he attacks Kay and almost rapes her. His actions lead to a confrontation with Lucy and her almost shooting him, after which Marino disappears. It is unknown if he has killed himself or just runs away as the book ends. Marino reappears in Scarpetta. By Autopsy, he had teamed up with Lucy in a private investigation company.

During the COVID-19 pandemic, he married Kay's sister, Dorothy.

=== Benton Wesley ===
Benton was an FBI profiler.

"He was FBI right down to his Florsheim shoes, a sharp-featured man with prematurely silver hair suggesting a mellow disposition that wasn't there."

He and Scarpetta work together on many cases. They have an affair for several years. Once Benton is no longer with his wife he wishes to marry Kay, but she resists because she is too independent. In Point of Origin Benton disappears; a body is found at the scene of a fire, tortured and badly burned. Kay identifies the body as Benton's by the Breitling watch she had given him. In Blow Fly it is revealed that he is not dead, but hiding in a witness protection program. In Book of the Dead Kay and Benton become engaged; they are married by the beginning of Scarpetta.

In the early books Benton is described as the unit chief of the FBI profilers with a master's degree in psychology, working out of Quantico. In Point of Origin he has supposedly retired from the FBI and is working as a private consultant, though in The Scarpetta Factor it is implied that he was still under the FBI's control and was forced into the witness program, then into a retirement that he still resents. In Book of the Dead and the books following his return, he is a forensic psychologist on staff at McLean in Massachusetts, then also at Bellevue in NYC, while still consulting for the FBI. By Autopsy he is working for the US Secret Service.

=== Dorothy Farinelli ===
Dorothy is Kay's sister and mother of Lucy. Kay says of her that, "my sister should never have been a mother. My sister should never have been Italian." When she was 18, she married Armando, an old man who was very rich. She became a graphic novelist. During the COVID-19 pandemic, she married Pete Marino.

== Novels ==
1. Postmortem (1990)
2. Body of Evidence (1991)
3. All That Remains (1992)
4. Cruel and Unusual (1993)
5. The Body Farm (1994)
6. From Potter's Field (1995)
7. Cause of Death (1996)
8. Unnatural Exposure (1997)
9. Point of Origin (1998)
10. Black Notice (1999)
11. The Last Precinct (2000)
12. Blow Fly (2003)
13. Trace (2004)
14. Predator (2005)
15. Book of the Dead (2007)
16. Scarpetta (2008)
17. The Scarpetta Factor (2009)
18. Port Mortuary (2010)
19. Red Mist (2011)
20. The Bone Bed (2012)
21. Dust (2013)
22. Flesh and Blood (2014)
23. Depraved Heart (2015)
24. Chaos (2016)
25. Autopsy (2021)
26. Livid (2022)
27. Unnatural Death (2023)
28. Identity Unknown (2024)
29. Sharp Force (2025)

== Television adaptation ==
In June 2021, it was reported that a television series adaptation of novel series is in development from Comet Pictures, a production company owned by Jamie Lee Curtis and Blumhouse Television. Nicole Kidman and Jamie Lee Curtis star as Kay Scarpetta and her sister Dorothy respectively. Both Kidman and Curtis are also executive producers. The series premiered March 11, 2026 on Prime Video.

== See also ==
- List of fictional medical examiners
