= Cruel and Unusual (novel) =

1993 crime novel by Patricia Cornwell

- First edition
- Author: Patricia Cornwell
- Language: English
- Series: Kay Scarpetta
- Genre: Crime
- Publisher: Scribner
- Publication date: 1993
- Publication place: United States
- Media type: Print (hardback & paperback)
- Pages: 384
- ISBN: 0-684-19530-5
- OCLC: 62171122
- LC Class: CPB Box no. 2390 vol. 1
- Preceded by: All That Remains
- Followed by: The Body Farm

Cruel and Unusual is a crime fiction novel by Patricia Cornwell. It is the fourth book in the Dr. Kay Scarpetta series.

== Plot summary ==
Virginia Chief Medical Examiner Kay Scarpetta is called in to autopsy the body of convicted murderer Ronnie Waddell after his execution. Several days after the execution, a young boy is discovered murdered in the fashion of Waddell's earlier killings, with Waddell's prints near the body. Scarpetta, along with FBI Agent Benton Wesley and Detective Pete Marino, try to discover how a dead inmate could have possibly committed another murder after his death. As the story progresses she seeks the assistance of her 17-year-old niece, Lucy, after she discovers a strange folder on her computer.

== Characters ==
- Kay Scarpetta – Chief Medical Examiner.
- Benton Wesley – Federal Bureau of Investigation profiler.
- Pete Marino – Detective Lieutenant in the Richmond Police Department
- Nicholas Grueman – Lawyer, advocate for the abolition of capital punishment, deeming it "cruel and unusual". Also Scarpetta's Georgetown lecturer, who had always seemed to be hard on Kay but it turned out that he had her interests at heart while doing so.
- Joe Norring – Governor of Virginia, Republican, Episcopalian; and held a law degree from UVA.
- Ben Stevens – Kay's morgue administrator. Is into drugs and a party-lifestyle. Being bribed by Frank Donahue to tamper with evidence.
- Temple Brooks Gault – The killer of the victims in the book. Uses the alias Hilton Sullivan. Being described by Benton Wesley as being "off the charts. If something strikes his fancy, he just does it. He's consummately narcissistic and vain – his hair, for example. He highlights it himself." He escaped apprehension.
- Lucy - Kay's niece

=== Victims ===
- Eddie Heath – 13-year-old boy who was murdered in a manner similar to Robyn Naismith years before. He had a single gunshot wound to his head, which he did not immediately die of. He was found naked with his back propped against a dumpster in a back alley. It was alleged he was abducted and killed while he was on the way home from a grocery shop.
- Jennifer Deighton – When discovered in the car, originally thought to be a suicide. A hose was hooked up to the exhaust pipe. However, during the postmortem autopsy, her cause of death was asphyxiation.
- Susan Dawson Story – Kay's morgue supervisor. Was being bribed by Ben Stevens. Did so because of personal financial trouble.
- Frank Donahue – Prison warden where Ronnie Joe Waddell is interned. He released an inmate, because he "needed some dirty work done. So he selected an inmate to be his personal operative and set the animal loose."
- Helen Grimes – Prison guard under warden Donahue. Was putting up Temple Gault at her place. Killed when Temple Gault's identity and place of lodging was compromised.

=== Other deaths ===
- Robyn Naismith – Victim of Ronnie Joe Waddell. She was killed with a single gunshot wound to her head at her home by Ronnie Joe Waddell. She was naked, with her back propped against the television. Bite marks were present on her body.
- Ronnie Joe Waddell – Convicted murderer of Robyn Naismith, and whose fingerprints are found at the scene of Jennifer Deighton. Sentenced to death by electrocution in the beginning of the book.
- Mark James – Died when a bomb placed in a trash can inside London's Victoria Station exploded at the moment he happened to walk past.

== Major themes ==
- The hunt for a killer and hope for glory

== Awards and nominations ==
- Cruel and Unusual won the CWA Gold Dagger for Fiction in 1993.
