= Patricia Cornwell =

American crime writer (born 1956)

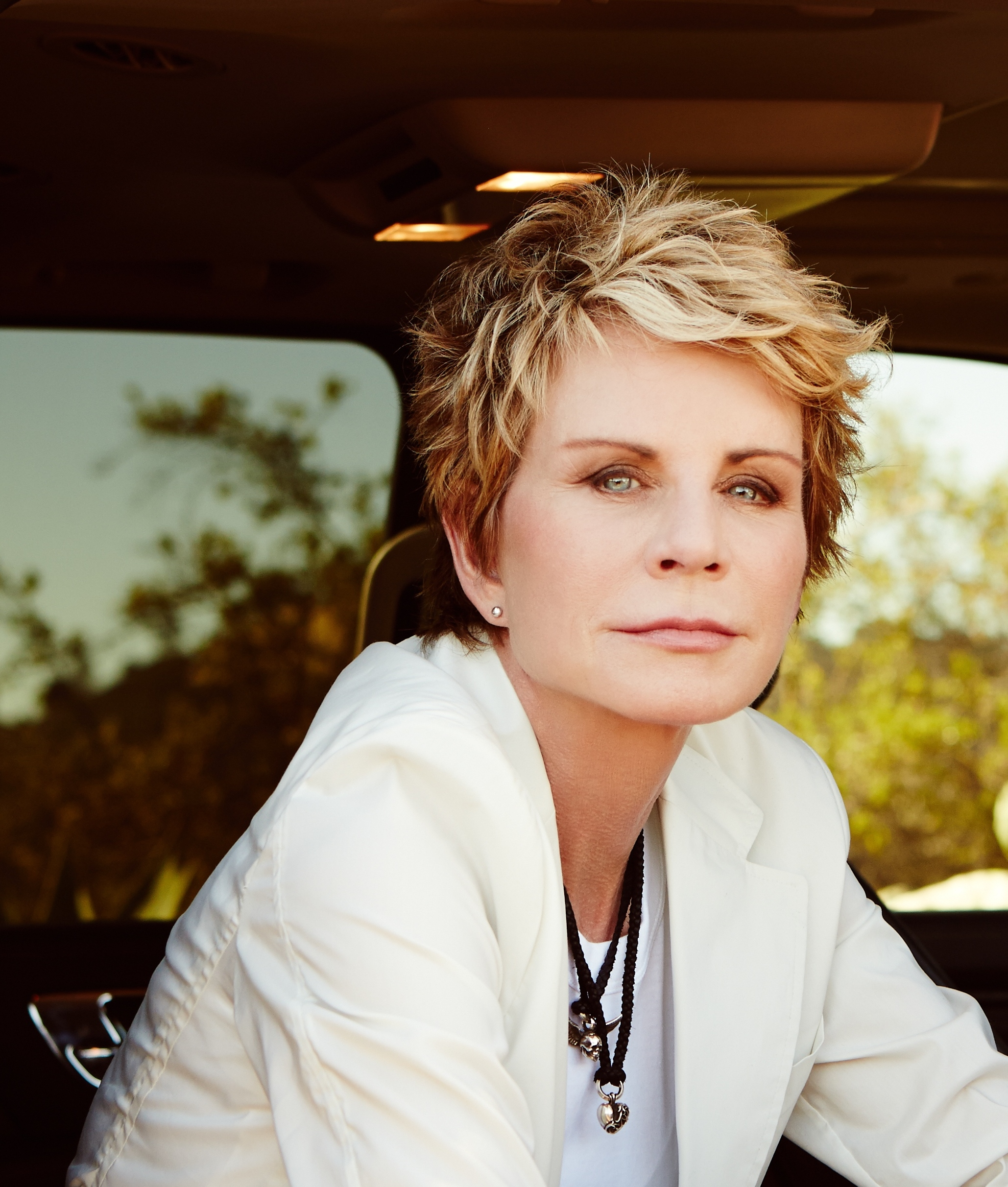
- Cornwell in 2016
- Born: Patricia Carroll Daniels; June 9, 1956 (age 70); Miami, Florida, U.S.
- Education: King College; Davidson College (BA)
- Occupation: Novelist
- Spouses: Charles Cornwell (m. 1980; div. 1989) Staci Gruber (m. 2006)
- Writing career
- Period: 1990–present
- Genre: Crime fiction
- Website: www.patriciacornwell.com

Patricia Cornwell (born Patricia Carroll Daniels; June 9, 1956) is an American crime writer. She is known for her best-selling novels featuring medical examiner Kay Scarpetta, of which the first was inspired by a series of sensational murders in Richmond, Virginia, where most of the stories are set. The plots are notable for their emphasis on forensic science, which has influenced later TV treatments of police work. Cornwell has also accused Walter Sickert of carrying out the Jack the Ripper killings. However, Sickert is not considered a serious suspect by most who study the case, and strong evidence shows he spent most of 1888 outside the UK, and was in France at the time of most of the Ripper murders. Her books have sold more than 120 million copies.

== Early life ==
A descendant of abolitionist and writer Harriet Beecher Stowe, Cornwell was born on June 9, 1956, in Miami, Florida, second of three children, to Marilyn (née Zenner) and Sam Daniels. Her father was one of the leading appellate lawyers in the United States and served as a law clerk to Supreme Court Justice Hugo Black. Cornwell later traced her own motivations in life to the emotional abuse she says she suffered from her father, who walked out on the family on Christmas Day 1961. She has said, "He was on his deathbed. We knew it was the last time we were seeing each other; he grabbed my brother's hand and mouthed 'I love you,' but he never touched me. All he did was write on a legal pad 'How's work?'"

In 1961, Marilyn left with three children in tow and moved to Montreat, North Carolina. Ruth Bell Graham, wife of the evangelist Billy Graham took the wayward family in and arranged for Cornwell and her brothers, Jim and John, to be raised by Lenore and Manfred Saunders, who had recently returned from Africa. Marilyn Daniels, suffering from severe depression, was hospitalized. Cornwell turned to Ruth Bell Graham as an authority figure, and it was she who noticed that Cornwell's talent lay in writing and encouraged her literary efforts. A bright student, a capable cartoonist, and a talented athlete on the tennis court, Cornwell attended King College in Bristol, Tennessee briefly before transferring to Davidson College on a tennis scholarship (which she later rejected), from which she graduated in 1979 with a B.A. in English.

== Career ==
In 1979, Cornwell began working as a reporter for The Charlotte Observer, initially editing TV listings, then moving to features, and finally becoming a reporter covering crime. In 1980, she received the North Carolina Press Association's Investigative Reporting Award for a series on prostitution. She continued at the newspaper until 1981, when she moved to Richmond, Virginia with her first husband, Charles Cornwell (married in 1980), who enrolled at the Union Theological Seminary. The same year she began working on a biography of Ruth Bell Graham, A Time for Remembering: The Ruth Bell Graham Story (renamed Ruth, A Portrait: The Story of Ruth Bell Graham in subsequent editions), which was published in 1983. The biography gained a Gold Medallion Book Award from the Evangelic Christian Publishers Association in 1985. However, it was a major blow to her friendship with Graham – they were not on speaking terms for eight years following the book's publication.

In 1984, Cornwell began work on her first novel, about a male detective named Joe Constable. She also met Dr. Marcella Farinelli Fierro, a medical examiner in Richmond, who became the subsequent inspiration for the character of Kay Scarpetta. In 1985, she took a job in the Office of the Chief Medical Examiner of Virginia. She worked there for six years, first as a technical writer and then as a computer analyst. She also volunteered to work with the Richmond Police Department. Cornwell wrote three novels that she says were rejected before the publication in 1990 of the first installment of her Scarpetta series, Postmortem, based on real-life stranglings in Richmond in the summer of 1987. The novel won her various awards including the British John Creasey Award, the French Prix du Roman d'Adventure and the American Edgar Award for Best First Novel.

=== Scarpetta series ===
The Scarpetta novels include a great deal of detail about forensic science. The initial resolution to the mystery is found in the forensic investigation of the murder victim's corpse, although Scarpetta does considerably more field investigation and confrontation with suspects than real-life medical examiners. The novels generally climax with action scenes in which Scarpetta and her associates confront, or are confronted by, the killer or killers, usually concluding with the death of the killer. The novels are considered to have influenced the development of popular TV series on forensics, both fictional, such as CSI: Crime Scene Investigation, and documentaries, such as Cold Case Files.

Other significant themes in the Scarpetta novels include health, individual safety and security, food, family, and the emerging sexual self-discovery of Scarpetta's niece. Often, conflicts and secret manipulations by Scarpetta's colleagues and staff are involved in the story-line and make the murder cases more complex. Although scenes from the novels take place in a variety of locations around the United States and (less commonly) internationally, they center around the city of Richmond, Virginia.

There are two marked style shifts in the Scarpetta novels. Starting from The Last Precinct (2000), the style changes from past tense to present tense. Starting from Blow Fly (2003), the style changes from a first person to a third person, omniscient, narrator. Events are even narrated from the viewpoint of the murderers. Before Blow Fly the events are seen through Scarpetta's eyes only, and other points of view only appear in letters that Scarpetta reads. Cornwell shifted back to a first-person perspective in the Scarpetta novel Port Mortuary (2010).

The Scarpetta TV series premiered on Amazon Prime Video on March 11, 2026.

=== Andy Brazil/Judy Hammer series ===
In addition to the Scarpetta novels, Cornwell has written three pseudo-police fictions, known as the Trooper Andy Brazil/Superintendent Judy Hammer series, which are set in North Carolina, Virginia, and off the mid-Atlantic coast.

=== Jack the Ripper theorist ===
Cornwell has been involved in a continuing, self-financed quest for evidence to support her theory that Victorian painter Walter Sickert was Jack the Ripper. In pursuit of this hypothesis, she has written two books: Portrait of a Killer: Jack the Ripper—Case Closed, published in 2002, and Ripper: The Secret Life of Walter Sickert, published in 2017. In total, she is said to have spent $6 million on Ripper-related research.

She wrote Portrait of a Killer to much controversy, especially within the British art world and among Ripperologists. Cornwell denied being obsessed with Jack the Ripper in full-page ads in two British newspapers and has said the case was "far from closed". In 2001, Cornwell was criticized for allegedly destroying one of Sickert's paintings in pursuit of the Ripper's identity. She believed the well-known painter to be responsible for the string of murders and had purchased over 30 of his paintings and argued that they closely resembled the Ripper crime scenes. Cornwell also claimed a breakthrough: a letter written by someone purporting to be the killer had the same watermark as some of Sickert's writing paper. Ripper experts noted, however, that there were hundreds of letters from different authors falsely claiming to be the killer, and the watermark in question was on a brand of stationery that was widely available.

French art expert Johann Naldi supports Cornwell's theory, claiming to have found a portrait that he attributes to the French painter Jacques-Émile Blanche. For Naldi, the discovery of this painting, which depicts a man who appears to share Sickert's features, is "visual confirmation" of Cornwell's theory.

=== TV appearance ===
Cornwell made a brief appearance as herself on the police procedural drama Criminal Minds, in the 2012 season 7 episode "True Genius".

Cornwell briefly appears in the first episode of the 2026 series Scarpetta as the government official who swears in Dr. Kay Scarpetta (played by Nicole Kidman) as Virginia's chief medical examiner.

== Legal issues ==
=== DUI case ===
On January 10, 1993, Cornwell crashed her Mercedes-Benz while under the influence of alcohol. She was convicted of drunk driving and sentenced to 28 days in a treatment center.

=== Leslie Sachs case ===
Leslie Sachs, author of The Virginia Ghost Murders (1998), claimed there were similarities between his novel and Cornwell's The Last Precinct. In 2000, he sent letters to Cornwell's publisher, started a web page, and placed stickers on copies of his novel alleging that Cornwell was committing plagiarism. The U.S. District Court for the Eastern District of Virginia granted Cornwell a preliminary injunction against Sachs, opining that his claims were likely to be found baseless.

In 2007, during her libel suit against Sachs, Cornwell testified that Sachs had accused her in online postings of being a "Jew hater" and "neo-Nazi" who bribed judges, conspired to have him killed, and was under investigation by U.S. authorities. The court permanently enjoined Sachs from making defamatory accusations against Cornwell and awarded Cornwell $37,780 in damages to cover the costs of defending herself against Sachs' internet attacks.

=== Anchin, Block & Anchin ===
In 2004, Cornwell assigned management of her financial matters to New York-based Anchin, Block & Anchin, managed by principal Evan Snapper. Agreeing to pay the firm a base rate of $40,000/month, her lawyer later claimed that Cornwell had hired Snapper to insulate herself from her money due to her ongoing mental health issues, and that Snapper knew this and took advantage of her over her four-and-a-half-year relationship with the company.

Cornwell fired the firm after discovering in July 2009 that the net worth of her and her company, Cornwell Entertainment Inc., despite having above $10 million in earnings per year during the previous four years, was a little under $13 million, the equivalent of only one year's net income. After Cornwell filed the lawsuit, Snapper pleaded guilty to violating campaign finance regulations, having used some of the money to buy tickets for an Elton John concert benefitting Hillary Clinton. The court case opened in January 2013, with Cornwell suing the firm for a combined sum of $100 million. On February 19, a Boston jury awarded Cornwell US$50.9 million (£33.4 million).

== Personal life ==
=== Relationships ===
On June 14, 1980, she married Charles L. Cornwell, who was 17 years her senior and one of her professors. The marriage occurred shortly before her graduation. Charles Cornwell later became a Christian preacher. In 1989, the couple separated, with Patricia retaining her married name after the divorce.

Cornwell had a relationship with FBI agent Marguerite "Margo" Bennett, which earned headlines in 1989 after Bennett's husband attempted to kidnap his estranged wife.

In 2006, Cornwell married Staci Gruber, an associate professor of psychiatry at Harvard University. However, she did not disclose news of her marriage until 2007. Cornwell later stated that turning 50 had made her see the importance of speaking out for equal rights and spoke of how Billie Jean King had helped her come to terms with talking about her sexuality publicly. She lives with Gruber in Massachusetts.

Since childhood, Cornwell has been friends with the family of evangelist Billy Graham and his wife Ruth Bell, often serving as the family's unofficial spokesperson to the media. She also wrote an authorized biography of Ruth Bell Graham. Cornwell was previously a personal friend of President George H. W. Bush. She referred to him as "Big George" and vacationed at the family's summer retreat in Kennebunkport, Maine, but later distanced herself from the Bush family.

=== Health problems ===
Cornwell has in the past suffered from anorexia nervosa and depression, which began in her late teens. She spoke openly in 2008-09 about her struggle with bipolar disorder, but in 2015 said that she was misdiagnosed.

=== Political views ===
Since 1998, Cornwell has donated at least $84,000 to the Republican Party and $78,800 to the Democratic Party, and has made individual contributions to Republican and Democratic U.S. Senate candidates, including George Allen, John Warner, Orrin Hatch, Hillary Clinton, Nicola Tsongas, Charles Robb, and Mark Warner.

Cornwell has spoken negatively of the presidency of George W. Bush, saying, "I was supportive of young George W. Bush because I liked his family. I thought he was going to be another Big George. Boy, was I ever wrong. It's not a democracy so much as a theocracy, and those are not the principles this country was founded on."

=== Charity ===
Cornwell has made several notable charitable donations, including funding the Virginia Institute for Forensic Science and Medicine, funding scholarships to the University of Tennessee's National Forensics Academy and Davidson College's Creative Writing Program (the result of which is the Patricia Cornwell Creative Writing Scholarship, awarded to one or two incoming freshmen), and donating her collection of Walter Sickert paintings to Harvard University. As a member of the Harvard-affiliated McLean Hospital's National Council, she is an advocate for psychiatric research. She has also made million-dollar donations to the John Jay College of Criminal Justice for the Crime Scene Academy and to the Harvard Art Museum. She donated funds to the Richmond, Virginia, police department and neighboring Henrico County police department to purchase bulletproof vests for police dogs. Cornwell is also a major contributor to the Veterans Village of San Diego, with lifetime giving of more than $250,000. The Office of the Chief Medical Examiner in Baltimore, Maryland trains investigators in the Scarpetta House, a full-scale apartment donated by Cornwell, in which crime scenes are staged.

=== Hobbies ===
Cornwell received her private helicopter license in 1999.

== Works ==
=== Fiction series ===
Kay Scarpetta series

1. Postmortem (1990)
2. Body of Evidence (1991)
3. All That Remains (1992)
4. Cruel and Unusual (1993)
5. The Body Farm (1994)
6. From Potter's Field (1995)
7. Cause of Death (1996)
8. Unnatural Exposure (1997)
9. Point of Origin (1998)
  - Scarpetta's Winter Table (1998) (cookbook)
10. Black Notice (1999)
11. The Last Precinct (2000)
12. Blow Fly (2003)
13. Trace (2004)
14. Predator (2005)
15. Book of the Dead (2007)
16. Scarpetta (2008)
17. The Scarpetta Factor (2009)
18. Port Mortuary (2010)
19. Red Mist (2011)
20. The Bone Bed (2012)
21. Dust (2013)
22. Flesh and Blood (2014)
23. Depraved Heart (2015)
24. Chaos (2016)
25. Autopsy (2021)
26. Livid (2022)
27. Unnatural Death (2023)
28. Identity Unknown (2024)
29. Sharp Force (2025)

Andy Brazil / Judy Hammer series

1. Hornet's Nest (1996)
2. Southern Cross (1998)
3. Isle of Dogs (2001)

Win Garano series

1. At Risk (2006)
2. The Front (2008)

Captain Chase series

1. Quantum (2019)
2. Spin (2020)

=== Children's books ===
- Life's Little Fable (1999)

=== Non-fiction ===
- A Time for Remembering: The Ruth Graham Bell Story (1983) [Reprinted as An Uncommon Friend: The Authorized Biography of Ruth Graham Bell (1996) and Ruth, A Portrait: The Story of Ruth Bell Graham (1997)] Biography of Ruth Bell Graham
- Food to Die For: Secrets from Kay Scarpetta's Kitchen (2002)
- Portrait of a Killer: Jack the Ripper—Case Closed (2002)
- Ripper: The Secret Life of Walter Sickert (2017)
- True Crime: A Memoir (2026)

=== Omnibus ===
- The First Scarpetta Collection. Postmortem and Body of Evidence (1995)
- A Scarpetta Omnibus: Postmortem, Body of Evidence, All that Remains (2000)
- A Second Scarpetta Omnibus: Cruel and Unusual, The Body Farm, From Potter's Field (2000)
- A Third Scarpetta Omnibus: Cause of Death, Unnatural Exposure & Point of Origin (2002)
- The Scarpetta Collection Volume 1: Postmortem and Body of Evidence (2003)
- The Scarpetta Collection Volume 2: All that Remains and Cruel and Unusual (2003)

== Awards ==
- ECPA Gold Medallion Book Award in the Biography/Autobiography category for A Time For Remembering (1985)
- Edgar Award, John Creasey Memorial Award, Anthony Award, and Macavity Award; for Postmortem (1991) (Cornwell is the only author to receive these awards in a single year)
- Prix du Roman d'Adventures for Postmortem (1992)
- Golden Plate Award of the American Academy of Achievement (1995)
- Gold Dagger for Cruel and Unusual (1993)
- Sherlock Award for Best Detective for the character Kay Scarpetta (1999)
- British Book Awards' Crime Thriller of the Year for Book of the Dead (2008) (Cornwell is the first American author to receive this award.)
- RBA Prize for Crime Writing 2011 for Red Mist, the world's most lucrative crime fiction prize at €125,000.
