= List of The New York Times number-one books of 1994 =

The American daily newspaper The New York Times publishes multiple weekly lists ranking the best selling books in the United States.

== Fiction ==
The following list ranks the number-one best selling fiction books, in the hardcover fiction category.

Date	Book	Author
January 2	Slow Waltz in Cedar Bend	Robert James Waller
January 9	Slow Waltz in Cedar Bend	Robert James Waller
January 16	The Bridges of Madison County	Robert James Waller
January 23	Disclosure	Michael Crichton
January 30	Disclosure	Michael Crichton
February 6	Disclosure	Michael Crichton
February 13	Disclosure	Michael Crichton
February 20	Disclosure	Michael Crichton
February 27	Accident	Danielle Steel
March 6	Accident	Danielle Steel
March 13	Accident	Danielle Steel
March 20	Accident	Danielle Steel
March 27	Accident	Danielle Steel
April 3	The Celestine Prophecy	James Redfield
April 10	The Celestine Prophecy	James Redfield
April 17	The Celestine Prophecy	James Redfield
April 24	The Celestine Prophecy	James Redfield
May 1	The Celestine Prophecy	James Redfield
May 8	The Celestine Prophecy	James Redfield
May 15	The Celestine Prophecy	James Redfield
May 22	Remember Me	Mary Higgins Clark
May 29	The Celestine Prophecy	James Redfield
June 5	The Celestine Prophecy	James Redfield
June 12	The Chamber	John Grisham
June 19	The Chamber	John Grisham
June 26	The Chamber	John Grisham
July 3	The Chamber	John Grisham
July 10	The Chamber	John Grisham
July 17	The Chamber	John Grisham
July 24	The Chamber	John Grisham
July 31	The Chamber	John Grisham
August 7	The Gift	Danielle Steel
August 14	The Gift	Danielle Steel
August 21	The Gift	Danielle Steel
August 28	The Gift	Danielle Steel
September 4	Debt of Honor	Tom Clancy
September 11	Debt of Honor	Tom Clancy
September 18	Debt of Honor	Tom Clancy
September 25	Debt of Honor	Tom Clancy
October 2	Debt of Honor	Tom Clancy
October 9	Debt of Honor	Tom Clancy
October 16	Taltos	Anne Rice
October 23	Insomnia	Stephen King
October 30	Insomnia	Stephen King
November 6	Insomnia	Stephen King
November 13	The Celestine Prophecy	James Redfield
November 20	The Celestine Prophecy	James Redfield
November 27	The Celestine Prophecy	James Redfield
December 4	The Celestine Prophecy	James Redfield
December 11	Politically Correct Bedtime Stories	James Finn Garner
December 18	Politically Correct Bedtime Stories	James Finn Garner
December 25	Politically Correct Bedtime Stories	James Finn Garner

== Nonfiction ==
The following list ranks the number-one best selling nonfiction books, in the hardcover nonfiction category.

Date	Book	Author
January 2	See, I Told You So	Rush H. Limbaugh 3rd
January 9	See, I Told You So	Rush H. Limbaugh 3rd
January 16	The Book of Virtues	William J. Bennett
January 23	Embraced by the Light	Betty J. Eadie with Curtis Taylor
January 30	Embraced by the Light	Betty J. Eadie with Curtis Taylor
February 6	Embraced by the Light	Betty J. Eadie with Curtis Taylor
February 13	Embraced by the Light	Betty J. Eadie with Curtis Taylor
February 20	Embraced by the Light	Betty J. Eadie with Curtis Taylor
February 27	Embraced by the Light	Betty J. Eadie with Curtis Taylor
March 6	Embraced by the Light	Betty J. Eadie with Curtis Taylor
March 13	Embraced by the Light	Betty J. Eadie with Curtis Taylor
March 20	Embraced by the Light	Betty J. Eadie with Curtis Taylor
March 27	Embraced by the Light	Betty J. Eadie with Curtis Taylor
April 3	Embraced by the Light	Betty J. Eadie with Curtis Taylor
April 10	Embraced by the Light	Betty J. Eadie with Curtis Taylor
April 17	Embraced by the Light	Betty J. Eadie with Curtis Taylor
April 24	Embraced by the Light	Betty J. Eadie with Curtis Taylor
May 1	Embraced by the Light	Betty J. Eadie with Curtis Taylor
May 8	Embraced by the Light	Betty J. Eadie with Curtis Taylor
May 15	Embraced by the Light	Betty J. Eadie with Curtis Taylor
May 22	Embraced by the Light	Betty J. Eadie with Curtis Taylor
May 29	Embraced by the Light	Betty J. Eadie with Curtis Taylor
June 5	Embraced by the Light	Betty J. Eadie with Curtis Taylor
June 12	Embraced by the Light	Betty J. Eadie with Curtis Taylor
June 19	Embraced by the Light	Betty J. Eadie with Curtis Taylor
June 26	The Agenda	Bob Woodward
July 3	The Agenda	Bob Woodward
July 10	The Agenda	Bob Woodward
July 17	The Agenda	Bob Woodward
July 24	The Agenda	Bob Woodward
July 31	The Agenda	Bob Woodward
August 7	Embraced by the Light	Betty J. Eadie with Curtis Taylor
August 14	Embraced by the Light	Betty J. Eadie with Curtis Taylor
August 21	Embraced by the Light	Betty J. Eadie with Curtis Taylor
August 28	Embraced by the Light	Betty J. Eadie with Curtis Taylor
September 4	Embraced by the Light	Betty J. Eadie with Curtis Taylor
September 11	Embraced by the Light	Betty J. Eadie with Curtis Taylor
September 18	Embraced by the Light	Betty J. Eadie with Curtis Taylor
September 25	Couplehood	Paul Reiser
October 2	Barbara Bush: A Memoir	Barbara Bush
October 9	Barbara Bush: A Memoir	Barbara Bush
October 16	Barbara Bush: A Memoir	Barbara Bush
October 23	Barbara Bush: A Memoir	Barbara Bush
October 30	Don't Stand Too Close to a Naked Man	Tim Allen
November 6	Nicole Brown Simpson	Faye Resnick with Mike Walker
November 13	Crossing the Threshold of Hope	John Paul II
November 20	Crossing the Threshold of Hope	John Paul II
November 27	Crossing the Threshold of Hope	John Paul II
December 4	Crossing the Threshold of Hope	John Paul II
December 11	Crossing the Threshold of Hope	John Paul II
December 18	Don't Stand Too Close to a Naked Man	Tim Allen
December 25	Don't Stand Too Close to a Naked Man	Tim Allen

== See also ==
- Publishers Weekly list of bestselling novels in the United States in the 1990s
