= Publishers Weekly list of bestselling novels in the United States in the 1990s =

This is a list of bestselling novels in the United States in the 1990s, as determined by Publishers Weekly. The list features the most popular novels of each year from 1990 through 1999.

The standards set for inclusion in the lists – which, for example, led to the exclusion of the novels in the Harry Potter series from the lists for the 1990s and 2000s – are currently unknown.

== 1990 ==
1. The Plains of Passage by Jean M. Auel
2. Four Past Midnight by Stephen King
3. The Burden of Proof by Scott Turow
4. Memories of Midnight by Sidney Sheldon
5. Message from Nam by Danielle Steel
6. The Bourne Ultimatum by Robert Ludlum
7. The Stand by Stephen King
8. Lady Boss by Jackie Collins
9. The Witching Hour by Anne Rice
10. September by Rosamunde Pilcher

== 1991 ==
1. Scarlett by Alexandra Ripley
2. The Sum of All Fears by Tom Clancy
3. Needful Things by Stephen King
4. No Greater Love by Danielle Steel
5. Heartbeat by Danielle Steel
6. The Doomsday Conspiracy by Sidney Sheldon
7. The Firm by John Grisham
8. Night Over Water by Ken Follett
9. Remember by Barbara Taylor Bradford
10. Loves Music, Loves to Dance by Mary Higgins Clark

== 1992 ==
1. Dolores Claiborne by Stephen King
2. The Pelican Brief by John Grisham
3. Gerald's Game by Stephen King
4. Mixed Blessings by Danielle Steel
5. Jewels by Danielle Steel
6. The Stars Shine Down by Sidney Sheldon
7. The Tale of the Body Thief by Anne Rice
8. Mexico by James A. Michener
9. Waiting to Exhale by Terry McMillan
10. All Around the Town by Mary Higgins Clark

== 1993 ==
1. The Bridges of Madison County by Robert James Waller
2. The Client by John Grisham
3. Slow Waltz in Cedar Bend by Robert James Waller
4. Without Remorse by Tom Clancy
5. Nightmares & Dreamscapes by Stephen King
6. Vanished by Danielle Steel
7. Lasher by Anne Rice
8. Pleading Guilty by Scott Turow
9. Like Water for Chocolate by Laura Esquivel
10. The Scorpio Illusion by Robert Ludlum

== 1994 ==
1. The Chamber by John Grisham
2. Debt of Honor by Tom Clancy
3. The Celestine Prophecy by James Redfield
4. The Gift by Danielle Steel
5. Insomnia by Stephen King
6. Politically Correct Bedtime Stories by James Finn Garner
7. Wings by Danielle Steel
8. Accident by Danielle Steel
9. The Bridges of Madison County by Robert James Waller
10. Disclosure by Michael Crichton

== 1995 ==
1. The Rainmaker by John Grisham
2. The Lost World by Michael Crichton
3. Five Days in Paris by Danielle Steel
4. The Christmas Box by Richard Paul Evans
5. Lightning by Danielle Steel
6. The Celestine Prophecy by James Redfield
7. Rose Madder by Stephen King
8. Silent Night by Mary Higgins Clark
9. Politically Correct Holiday Stories by James Finn Garner
10. The Horse Whisperer by Nicholas Evans

== 1996 ==
1. The Runaway Jury by John Grisham
2. Executive Orders by Tom Clancy
3. Desperation by Stephen King
4. Airframe by Michael Crichton
5. The Regulators by Richard Bachman (Stephen King)
6. Malice by Danielle Steel
7. Silent Honor by Danielle Steel
8. Primary Colors by Anonymous
9. Cause of Death by Patricia Cornwell
10. The Tenth Insight by James Redfield

== 1997 ==
1. The Partner by John Grisham
2. Cold Mountain by Charles Frazier
3. The Ghost by Danielle Steel
4. The Ranch by Danielle Steel
5. Special Delivery by Danielle Steel
6. Unnatural Exposure by Patricia Cornwell
7. The Best Laid Plans by Sidney Sheldon
8. Pretend You Don't See Her by Mary Higgins Clark
9. Cat and Mouse by James Patterson
10. Hornet's Nest by Patricia Cornwell

== 1998 ==
1. The Street Lawyer by John Grisham
2. Rainbow Six by Tom Clancy
3. Bag of Bones by Stephen King
4. A Man in Full by Tom Wolfe
5. Mirror Image by Danielle Steel
6. The Long Road Home by Danielle Steel
7. The Klone and I by Danielle Steel
8. Point of Origin by Patricia Cornwell
9. Paradise by Toni Morrison
10. All Through the Night by Mary Higgins Clark

== 1999 ==
1. The Testament by John Grisham
2. Hannibal by Thomas Harris
3. Assassins by Jerry B. Jenkins and Tim LaHaye
4. Star Wars: Episode 1, The Phantom Menace by Terry Brooks
5. Timeline by Michael Crichton
6. Hearts in Atlantis by Stephen King
7. Apollyon by Jerry B. Jenkins and Tim LaHaye
8. The Girl Who Loved Tom Gordon by Stephen King
9. Irresistible Forces by Danielle Steel
10. Tara Road by Maeve Binchy
