= Wings (Steel novel) =

1994 novel by Danielle Steel

- Author: Danielle Steel
- Language: English
- Genre: Romance
- Publisher: Delacorte Press
- Publication date: December 1994
- Publication place: United States
- Pages: 408
- ISBN: 978-0-385-30605-8

Wings is a 1994 romance novel by American author Danielle Steel, published by Delacorte Press. It follows a young woman, Cassie O'Malley, who dreams of flying planes, despite opposition from her father, along with her romance with her tutor Nick. It received generally positive reviews and was one of the best selling novels of 1994 in the United States according to Publishers Weekly.

== Plot ==
Wings starts in the interwar period, following Cassie O'Malley, daughter of the owner of a small private airport outside of Chicago, Pat. Unlike her brother Chris, Cassie is interested in operating and maintaining planes. She starts receiving secret lessons from a World War I-era friend of her father's, Nick Galvin. She eventually proves herself to be a good flyer, and her father reluctantly agrees to offer her a job at their family's airport. Throughout this process, Cassie beings falling in love with Nick. Although Nick is attracted to her, he refuses to enter a relationship with her, seeing himself as too old for her, being 18 years older.

A man named Desmond Williams offers Cassie a job testing planes and setting flying records. Nick encourages her to take the offer. Eventually, Cassie believes she is in love with Desmond and marries him before starting off on a "world tour", although she does spend one night with Nick beforehand. The tour ends when Cassie crashes onto an island in the pacific, nearly starving and freezing before being rescued. Even after she is rescued, she is brought back to Pearl Harbor just in time for it to be attacked by Japanese forces. Cassie ends the novel joining the Air Force in a women's plane-ferrying unit.

== Publication history ==
Wings was first published by Delacorte Press on December 1, 1994. It was Steel's 34th novel, following The Gift and preceding Lightning.

== Reception ==
Wings received generally positive reviews. Steel's depictions of characters and their relationships, romantic and familial, were praised. The Waterloo Region Record's Paula Schuck considered Cassie O'Malley to be one of Wings's standout features due to her strong personality and temperament. The novel's background, set in aviation and war, was considered to be generally too shallow to be truly engaging; Kirkus Reviews stated that it would "[do] nothing to tax the reader bent on romance". Critics agreed that Wings would be popular among fans of Steel's typical writing.

Wings was a best-seller when it was released, reaching number seven on Publishers Weekly's annual bestsellers list for 1994.
