= All Around the Town =

All Around the Town may refer to:

- All Around the Town (picture book), a 1948 picture book written by Phyllis McGinley and illustrated by Helen Stone
- All Around the Town (novel), a 1992 novel by Mary Higgins Clark
