= List of The New York Times number-one books of 1991 =

The American daily newspaper The New York Times publishes multiple weekly lists ranking the best selling books in the United States.

== Fiction ==
The following list ranks the number-one best selling fiction books, in the hardcover fiction category.

Date	Book	Author
January 6	The Plains of Passage	Jean M. Auel
January 13	The Plains of Passage	Jean M. Auel
January 20	The Secret Pilgrim	John le Carré
January 27	The Secret Pilgrim	John le Carré
February 3	Cold Fire	Dean Koontz
February 10	Cold Fire	Dean Koontz
February 17	Cold Fire	Dean Koontz
February 24	Heartbeat	Danielle Steel
March 3	Heartbeat	Danielle Steel
March 10	Heartbeat	Danielle Steel
March 17	Heartbeat	Danielle Steel
March 24	Heartbeat	Danielle Steel
March 31	Heartbeat	Danielle Steel
April 7	Heartbeat	Danielle Steel
April 14	Heartbeat	Danielle Steel
April 21	The Seeress of Kell	David Eddings
April 28	The Seeress of Kell	David Eddings
May 5	The Seeress of Kell	David Eddings
May 12	Loves Music, Loves to Dance	Mary Higgins Clark
May 19	Loves Music, Loves to Dance	Mary Higgins Clark
May 26	Loves Music, Loves to Dance	Mary Higgins Clark
June 2	Loves Music, Loves to Dance	Mary Higgins Clark
June 9	Loves Music, Loves to Dance	Mary Higgins Clark
June 16	Loves Music, Loves to Dance	Mary Higgins Clark
June 23	Oh, the Places You'll Go!	Dr. Seuss
June 30	Heir to the Empire	Timothy Zahn
July 7	The Kitchen God's Wife	Amy Tan
July 14	The Kitchen God's Wife	Amy Tan
July 21	The Kitchen God's Wife	Amy Tan
July 28	The Kitchen God's Wife	Amy Tan
August 4	The Kitchen God's Wife	Amy Tan
August 11	The Kitchen God's Wife	Amy Tan
August 18	The Kitchen God's Wife	Amy Tan
August 25	The Sum of All Fears	Tom Clancy
September 1	The Sum of All Fears	Tom Clancy
September 8	The Sum of All Fears	Tom Clancy
September 15	The Sum of All Fears	Tom Clancy
September 22	The Sum of All Fears	Tom Clancy
September 29	The Sum of All Fears	Tom Clancy
October 6	The Sum of All Fears	Tom Clancy
October 13	Scarlett	Alexandra Ripley
October 20	Scarlett	Alexandra Ripley
October 27	Scarlett	Alexandra Ripley
November 3	Scarlett	Alexandra Ripley
November 10	Scarlett	Alexandra Ripley
November 17	Scarlett	Alexandra Ripley
November 24	Scarlett	Alexandra Ripley
December 1	Scarlett	Alexandra Ripley
December 8	Scarlett	Alexandra Ripley
December 15	Scarlett	Alexandra Ripley
December 22	Scarlett	Alexandra Ripley
December 29	Scarlett	Alexandra Ripley

== Nonfiction ==
The following list ranks the number-one best selling nonfiction books, in the hardcover nonfiction category.

Date	Book	Author
January 6	A Life on the Road	Charles Kuralt
January 13	A Life on the Road	Charles Kuralt
January 20	A Life on the Road	Charles Kuralt
January 27	Iron John	Robert Bly
February 3	Iron John	Robert Bly
February 10	The Prize	Daniel Yergin
February 17	Iron John	Robert Bly
February 24	Iron John	Robert Bly
March 3	Iron John	Robert Bly
March 10	Iron John	Robert Bly
March 17	And the Sea Will Tell	Vincent Bugliosi with Bruce B. Henderson
March 24	Iron John	Robert Bly
March 31	Iron John	Robert Bly
April 7	You'll Never Eat Lunch in This Town Again	Julia Phillips
April 14	You'll Never Eat Lunch in This Town Again	Julia Phillips
April 21	You'll Never Eat Lunch in This Town Again	Julia Phillips
April 28	Nancy Reagan	Kitty Kelley
May 5	Nancy Reagan	Kitty Kelley
May 12	Nancy Reagan	Kitty Kelley
May 19	Nancy Reagan	Kitty Kelley
May 26	Nancy Reagan	Kitty Kelley
June 2	The Commanders	Bob Woodward
June 9	The Commanders	Bob Woodward
June 16	The Commanders	Bob Woodward
June 23	The Commanders	Bob Woodward
June 30	The Commanders	Bob Woodward
July 7	Iron John	Robert Bly
July 14	Iron John	Robert Bly
July 21	Chutzpah	Alan M. Dershowitz
July 28	Chutzpah	Alan M. Dershowitz
August 4	Chutzpah	Alan M. Dershowitz
August 11	Iron John	Robert Bly
August 18	Chutzpah	Alan M. Dershowitz
August 25	Parliament of Whores	P. J. O'Rourke
September 1	When You Look Like Your Passport Photo, It is Time to Go Home	Erma Bombeck
September 8	Uh-Oh	Robert Fulghum
September 15	Uh-Oh	Robert Fulghum
September 22	Me: Stories of My Life	Katharine Hepburn
September 29	Me: Stories of My Life	Katharine Hepburn
October 6	Me: Stories of My Life	Katharine Hepburn
October 13	Me: Stories of My Life	Katharine Hepburn
October 20	Me: Stories of My Life	Katharine Hepburn
October 27	Me: Stories of My Life	Katharine Hepburn
November 3	Den of Thieves	James B. Stewart
November 10	Den of Thieves	James B. Stewart
November 17	Den of Thieves	James B. Stewart
November 24	Den of Thieves	James B. Stewart
December 1	Under Fire	Oliver L. North with William Novak
December 8	Me: Stories of My Life	Katharine Hepburn
December 15	Me: Stories of My Life	Katharine Hepburn
December 22	Me: Stories of My Life	Katharine Hepburn
December 29	Me: Stories of My Life	Katharine Hepburn

== See also ==
- Publishers Weekly list of bestselling novels in the United States in the 1990s
