= Douglas Groothuis =

American Christian philosopher (born 1957)

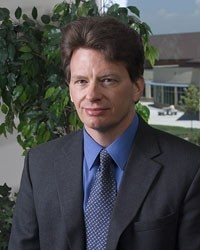
- Born: January 3, 1957 (age 69)
- Spouse: Rebecca Merrill (d. 2018)

Education
- Education: University of Oregon

Philosophical work
- Era: 20th-century philosophy
- Region: Western philosophy
- School: Analytic philosophy
- Institutions: Cornerstone University
- Main interests: Natural theology, Blaise Pascal, ethics, philosophy of religion
- Notable works: Unmasking the New Age (1986); Confronting the New Age (1988); Christian Apologetics (2011)
- Website: douglasgroothuis.com

Douglas R. Groothuis (/ˈɡroʊtaɪs/ GROH-tysse; born January 3, 1957) is an American Christian philosopher who is a professor of philosophy at Cornerstone University. Groothuis was a campus pastor for twelve years prior to obtaining a position as an associate professor of philosophy of religion and ethics at Denver Seminary from 1993 to 2024. In August 2024, he joined Cornerstone as the Distinguished Professor of Apologetics and Christian Worldview. He was educated at the University of Wisconsin–Madison and the University of Oregon. He was married to Rebecca Merrill Groothuis until her death on July 6, 2018. Douglas is part of the President's Fellows Program at Cornerstone, where he serves as a student mentor and participates in speaking engagements.

== Career ==
During the late 1980s Groothuis emerged as a younger voice in evangelicalism with two books that described and analyzed New Age spirituality: Unmasking the New Age and Confronting the New Age. In subsequent books he pursued specific topics in New Age spirituality such as claims that Jesus spent his adolescent years studying among Hindu and Buddhist teachers in India and Tibet in Revealing the New Age Jesus. The phenomena of near-death experiences and the claims of Betty Eadie about the afterlife were the subject of his analysis in Deceived by the Light.

In the 1990s, Groothuis began to write about the cultural shifts associated with postmodern philosophy in his book Truth Decay, as well as to formulate responses to those shifts via Christian apologetics. He was also interested in human behavior and belief associated with the use of the Internet, and wrote of his theological concerns in The Soul in Cyberspace. His interests in philosophy have also led him to write on topics like Immanuel Kant's epistemology, the rationality of theism, and book-length treatments of the philosophical ideas and methods of Blaise Pascal and Jesus. In 2011, Groothuis published a comprehensive textbook on Christian apologetics called Christian Apologetics (InterVarsity-Academic). A second edition appeared in 2022, which featured eight new chapters.

In his teaching career at Denver Seminary, he has taught graduate courses in Christian Apologetics, Problems in Apologetics, Issues in Philosophy of Religion, Christian Ethics and Modern Culture, and Religious Pluralism, among many others. He joined Cornerstone University as a Distinguished Professor in the fall of 2024. He is a member of the Society of Christian Philosophers and the Evangelical Philosophical Society, has published twenty books and contributed to many others, and has written numerous articles, book reviews, and editorials. Articles have appeared in periodicals such as Christianity Today, the Journal of the Evangelical Theological Society, Philosophia Christi, and Moody Monthly.

== Bibliography ==
- Christianity That Counts (Grand Rapids: Baker, 1994). ISBN 0-8010-3868-5
- Confronting the New Age (Downers Grove: InterVarsity Press, 1988). ISBN 0-8308-1223-7
- Deceived by the Light (Eugene: Harvest House, 1995). ISBN 1-56507-301-0
- On Jesus (South Melbourne and Belmont: Thomson/Wadsworth, 2003). ISBN 0-534-58394-6
- On Pascal (South Melbourne and Belmont: Thomson/Wadsworth, 2003). ISBN 0-534-58391-1
- Revealing the New Age Jesus (Downers Grove: InterVarsity Press, 1990). ISBN 0-8308-1298-9
- The Soul in Cyberspace (Grand Rapids: Baker, 1997). ISBN 0-8010-5760-4
- Truth Decay (Downers Grove: InterVarsity Press, 2000). ISBN 0-8308-2228-3
- Unmasking the New Age (Downers Grove: InterVarsity Press, 1986). ISBN 0-87784-568-9
- In Defense of Natural Theology: A Post-Humean Assessment, co-edited with James F. Sennett (Downers Grove: InterVarsity Press, 2005). ISBN 978-0-8308-2767-1
- Jesus in an Age of Controversy (Wipf & Stock, 2002). ISBN 1-57910-869-5
- Christian Apologetics: A Comprehensive Case for Biblical Faith (InterVarsity Press, 2011). ISBN 978-0-8308-3935-3
- Philosophy in Seven Sentences: A Small Introduction to a Vast Topic (InterVarsity Press, 2016). ISBN 978-0-8308-4093-9
- Walking Through Twilight: A Wife's Illness—A Philosopher's Lament (InterVarsity Press, 2017). ISBN 978-0-8308-4518-7
- I Love You to the Stars: When Grandma Forgets, Love Remembers (Kregel Publications, 2020), co-authored with Crystal Bowman. ISBN 978-0825-4464-74
- Fire in the Streets: How You Can Confidently Respond to Incendiary Cultural Topics (Salem Books, 2022). ISBN 978-1684513086
- The Knowledge of God in the World and the Word: An Introduction to Classical Apologetics (Zondervan Academic, 2022), co-authored with Andrew I. Shepardson. ISBN 978-0310113072
- Christian Apologetics: A Comprehensive Case for Biblical Faith - Second Edition (InterVarsity Press, 2022). ISBN 978-1-5140-0275-9
