= Julie Hayden =

Julie Hayden may refer to:

- Julie Hayden (editor) (1938/39–1981), American short story writer and editor
- Julie Hayden (teacher) (died 1874), American murder victim

== See also ==
- Julie Haydon, American actress
