= Silent Night (disambiguation) =

"Silent Night" is a popular Christmas carol.

Silent Night(s) may also refer to:

== Film and television ==
- Silent Night (1995 film), a Swiss-German drama
- Silent Night (1996 film), a Nigerian film
- Silent Night (2002 film), a fact-based television movie set on Christmas Eve in 1944
- Silent Night (2012 film), a horror film starring Malcolm McDowell
- Silent Night (2021 film), a British-American dark comedy film set at Christmas
- Silent Night (2023 film), an American film by John Woo
- "Silent Night", an episode of the television series CSI: NY (season 3)
- "Silent Night", an episode of the television series Haven (season 2)

== Music ==
- Silent Night (album), a 1996 album by The Necks
- The Silent Night EP, a 2009 EP by Seabird
- Silent Nights, a 1985 album by Rick Wakeman
- "Silent Night" (Bon Jovi song), 1986
- Silent Night (opera), 2011
- Silent Nights, a 2008 EP by Scott Matthew
- "7 O'Clock News/Silent Night", a 1966 song by Simon & Garfunkel

== Other ==
- Silent-Night-Chapel, a monument where the Christmas carol was first performed.
- "Silent Night", 1994 issue of comics series Sin City, see list of Sin City yarns
- Silent Night, an annual basketball game at Taylor University
- Silent Night (novel), a 1995 thriller novel by Mary Higgins Clark

== See also ==
- Silentnight, British manufacturer of beds and mattresses
- Silent Knight (disambiguation)
