= Victoria Tunggono =

Indonesian writer

Victoria Tunggono (born 1984) is an Indonesian author. She has written the Nuswantara trilogy and Childfree & Happy.

== Career ==
Tunggono was born on 17 March 1984 in Ende, East Nusa Tenggara, Indonesia. She studied at the Bina Nusantara University in Jakarta and the Maranatha Christian University in Bandung. As a child, she was inspired by authors such as Paulo Coelho and Betty J. Eadie to write short stories.

She authored the Nuswantara trilogy of fantasy novels, about two Indonesian teenagers who discover a parallel world called Nuswantara . In 2021, Tunggono published the book Childfree & Happy, which she had written in two months at the end of 2020. The book is based on interviews with a childfree Facebook community and her own experiences.

== Selected works ==
- (2015) Gerbang Nuswantara
- (2018) Candi Nuswantara
- (2021) Jagat Nuswantara
- (2021) Childfree & Happy
