= Silent Knight (disambiguation) =

The Silent Knight is a DC Comics character.

Silent Knight may also refer to:

- Silent Knight (album), a 1980 album by Saga
- Silent Knight Shō, a manga by Masami Kurumada
- A variant of the Knight engine, for automobiles
- Silent Knight (refrigerator), former brand of refrigerator in mid 20th century Australia, owned by Edward Hallstrom.

== See also ==
- Silent Night (disambiguation)
