= Heartbeat (Steel novel) =

1991 novel by Danielle Steel

- Author: Danielle Steel
- Language: English
- Genre: Romance
- Publisher: Delacorte Press
- Publication date: February 1991
- Publication place: United States
- Pages: 358
- Preceded by: Message from Nam

Heartbeat is a 1991 romance novel by American author Danielle Steel, published by Delacorte Press. It was her 27th novel, following Message from Nam, and was commercially successful despite mixed reviews, becoming a Publishers Weekly bestseller for 1991 in the United States and spending 8 weeks as a New York Times number-one best-seller.

== Plot ==
Heartbeat follows Adrian Townsend, a Los Angeles news producer in her early 30s, who is married to a man named Steven. When Adrian becomes pregnant, Steven becomes enraged, encouraging her to get an abortion. Although not divorced, he leaves her when she decides to have the child. Afterwards, she begins a relationship with a man named Bill Thigpen, a soap opera writer who works in the same building as her.

== Publication and adaptions ==
Heartbeat is Steel's 27th novel, following Message from Nam. It was released in February 1991 and published by Delacorte Press. It was adapted into a made-for-TV film with the same name in 1993.

== Reception ==
Despite high sales, Heartbeat received mixed reviews. Freda Garmaise, reviewer for The Globe and Mail, expressed issue with Steel's use of the phrase "ivory smile" as a descriptor, saying she was unable to properly envision herself as Adrian due to the unsettling mental image. Although describing Heartbeat as "saccharine-sweet", the Dayton Daily News's Melanie Raley criticized Steel's repetitive prose and character dialogue and suggested that Steel needed a better editor. The Lexington Herald-Leader's Beverly Glass praised how the sexual content common in Steel's previous works was omitted while touching on serious contemporary subjects like abortion, seeing it as less "easy to forget" than her other novels. The Pittsburg Press writer June Cameron and Gannett News Service writer Jeff Williams both criticized the plot and characters. Williams considered the soap opera written by Thigpen to be more entertaining than the actual novel, which failed at "win[ning] back her fans" after her previous "contrived and much panned" work, Message from Nam; despite this, he acknowledged that Heartbeat had already spent seven weeks on the New York Times Best Seller list, while Cameron said that Steel's normal fans would buy the book just because of Steel's name. In a double review with Daphne Rose Kingma's book True Love, San Francisco Chronicle reviewer Patricia Holt wrote that Steel, who "shovels out fiction as though she were digging to China", could learn something about writing romance from Kingma's book.

Heartbeat was a best-seller when it was released, reaching number 5 on Publishers Weekly's annual bestsellers list for 1991, and spending 8 weeks as a New York Times bestseller, between February 24th and April 14th.
