= Phyllis McGinley =

American poet (1905–1978)

- Born: March 21, 1905; Ontario, Oregon, U.S.
- Died: February 22, 1978 (aged 72); New York City, U.S.
- Education: University of Southern California; University of Utah (BA)
- Spouse: Charles L. Hayden (m. 1937)
- Children: 2, including Julie
- Writing career
- Notable awards: Pulitzer Prize

Phyllis McGinley (March 21, 1905 – February 22, 1978) was an American author of children's books and poetry. Her poetry was in the style of light verse, specializing in humor, satiric tone and the positive aspects of suburban life. She won a Pulitzer Prize in 1961.

McGinley enjoyed a wide readership in her lifetime, publishing her work in newspapers and women's magazines such as the Ladies Home Journal, as well as in literary periodicals, including The New Yorker, The Saturday Review and The Atlantic. She also held nearly a dozen honorary degrees – "including one from the stronghold of strictly masculine pride, Dartmouth College" (from the dust jacket of Sixpence in Her Shoe). Time Magazine featured McGinley on its cover on June 18, 1965.

== Life ==
Phyllis McGinley was born March 21, 1905, in Ontario, Oregon, the daughter of Daniel and Julia Kiesel McGinley. Her father was a land speculator, and her mother a pianist. McGinley's family moved to a ranch near Iliff, Colorado, when she was only three months old. She did not enjoy her early childhood on the ranch, as she and her brother felt isolated and friendless. Her father died when she was 12 years old, and the family moved to Utah to live with a widowed aunt. She studied at the University of Southern California and musical theater at the University of Utah in Salt Lake City, where she was a Kappa Kappa Gamma, graduating in 1927. After selling some of her poems, she decided to move to New York in 1929. McGinley held an assortment of jobs there, including copywriter for an advertising agency, teacher at a junior high school in New Rochelle, and staff writer for Town and Country.

In 1934, she met Charles L. Hayden, who worked for the Bell Telephone Company during the day and played jazz piano in the evening. They married on June 25, 1937, and moved to Larchmont, New York. The suburban landscape and culture of her new home was to provide the subject matter of much of McGinley's work. McGinley had two daughters. Daughter Julie Hayden was the author of a favorably reviewed collection of short stories entitled The Lists of the Past.

In 1956, McGinley published a rhymed children's story called "The Year Without a Santa Claus" in Good Housekeeping magazine, and the piece generated enough positive interest to facilitate its being printed in book form the following year. In 1968, actor Boris Karloff recorded a narrated version of the story for a promotional Capitol Records LP which also featured various Christmas songs from the label's catalog on the flip side. Karloff's reading (warm and similar in feeling to his narration of the 'How the Grinch Stole Christmas' television classic) was also one of his last performances—he died a few months later, in February 1969.

Phyllis McGinley died in New York City in 1978.

The Phyllis McGinley Papers can be found at the Special Collections Research Center of Syracuse University. The collection comprises personal and business correspondence, writings, and memorabilia. Spanning 1897 to 1978, the collection reflects not only the professional career of the American humorist and Pulitzer Prize–winning poet but also the wide scope of her audience. Writings include, for any given title, any combination of work sheets, manuscripts, production records, and published versions of McGinley's books, essays, interviews, lyrics, poetry, reviews, scripts, speeches and stories. Memorabilia consists primarily of financial, legal, and printed materials, photographs and scrapbooks.

== Viewpoint ==
Marriage and stability were extremely important to McGinley after a childhood of frequent moves and "never having a real home." Having married happily at 32, considered late at the time, she appeared to love domesticity. McGinley's life with her husband, Charles Hayden, was, her daughter Patsy Blake stated, "a sanguine, benign, adorable version of 'Mad Men.' " The couple entertained avidly: the regular guest list included Bennett Cerf, the drama critic Walter Kerr and leading advertising executives of the day.

An ardent Roman Catholic, McGinley embraced domesticity in the wake of second-wave feminism, wrote light verse in the wake of the rise of modern avant-garde and confessional poetry, and filled the gap between the housewife and the feminist intellectual who rejected the domestic life. McGinley would spend most of her professional writing career fending off criticism that tended to diminish her image of a suburban housewife poet—an image that was meant to dismiss any depth in her writing. McGinley actually labeled herself a "housewife poet," and unlike Anne Sexton, who used the term to be ironic and self-deprecating, McGinley used it as an honorable and purposefully crafted identity.

Phyllis McGinley felt that the capability to foster familial relationships was what gave women their power, and she fought to defend their rights to do so. She both admired the housewife and her duties and fully recognized the monotony and drudgery that went along with this role. McGinley felt that, no matter what path a woman chose to follow, the most important thing was for a woman to recognize and acknowledge her unique and honorable place in life, and that a woman who enjoyed herself as a wife and mother should not submit to imposed ambitions or feel constrained to demand change in the institution of the church McGinley cherished. A 1964 newspaper portrayed her version of feminism in contradistinction to Betty Friedan's: "The Betty Friedan philosophy, that "committed" women will not need the regard of any man to feel alive, is rationally and effectively refuted by Miss McGinley."

The Plain Princess (1945) by Phyllis McGinley is the coming-of-age story of Esmeralda, who learns to shed her elitist disposition and becomes a humble and caring princess. A modern take on the conventional fairy tale, it challenges and reverses gender roles, cultural perceptions of suburbia, and fairy tale expectations of beauty. Unlike classic fairy tales, there is a complete nonreliance on men to resolve the complications that arise, and the strong and powerful woman character (in classic conventions often evil or have possessed magical powers) is a completely independent human woman who uses intelligence to help the female protagonist achieve her goals.

In the story, Esmeralda is thrust from her royal life into a suburban setting. The socialization of the princess within her new environment has a "magical" effect on her and rids her of her negative qualities. The transformation occurs when she becomes an independent person, both in knowledge and utility. This coincides with McGinley's view that a woman's role is not limited by suburbia but in fact is enhanced by it. While she admits that at times the day-to-day life can be monotonous, McGinley maintains that her suburban lifestyle is both fulfilling and liberating.

== Critical evaluation ==
The many manuscript drafts of McGinley's writings reveal her method of composition for various works. Perhaps most interesting are her essays, for which she often composed a "serious" version before producing her characteristically humorous final manuscript. Suburbia and sainthood are the prominent topics of McGinley's writing, together with occasional pieces produced for various holidays, especially Christmas.

Besides her popular reputation, she earned the admiration of a number of critics and poets, including W.H. Auden, who praised her imagination and technical skill in his foreword for Times Three. Auden praised her dexterous, unostentatious rhyming and found in her familial sensibility a likeness to Jane Austen and Virginia Woolf, yet also a singular, accessible voice.

McGinley has been criticized for providing readers with transient humor but not actually effecting any change. Betty Friedan has said that McGinley was a good craftsman but did nothing to improve or change the lives of housewives. To Friedan, domesticity cripplingly confined women and did not allow them a chance to pursue their own interests or careers. This was a reoccurring opinion amongst many of the second wave feminists who were McGinley's contemporaries. As a result, her poetry was largely ignored by feminist critics.

In 1964 she was honored with the Laetare Medal by the University of Notre Dame, which describes it as "An honor to a man or woman who has 'enriched the heritage of humanity.'"

Another criticism was McGinley's use of light verse poetry. Sylvia Plath wrote in her journal, "Phyllis McGinley is out – light verse: she's sold herself" (Leroy 14–15). Her use of light verse in the midst of the rise of modern avant-garde and confessional poetry made McGinley's poetry seem dated in form, as well as in ideology.

Phyllis McGinley was the recipient of a Pulitzer Prize in 1961 for her book Times Three. She was the first to be awarded the poetry prize for a collection of light verse.

== Use of light verse ==
McGinley, in the book The Writer Observed, describes the difference between her so-called light verse and the poems with more weighty material. In the book, she states that she has arrived at a distinction between the two: "the appeal of light verse is to the intellect and the appeal of serious verse is to the emotions."

Her ability to target this audience and make humorous routine responsibilities made her very popular. "In times of unrest and fear, it is perhaps the writer's duty to celebrate, to single out some values we can cherish, to talk about some of the few warm things we know in a cold world."

Her use of light verse has been linked by at least one critic to her embrace of domesticity: "Like writing light verse, housewifery took seemingly effortless skill, nuance, and balance; it, too, required a balancing act of mother/housekeeper/hostess where wit and humor were employed just as much as in McGinley's poetry. Delicacy in awkward situations not only was the role of the hostess housewife, but also could be said of McGinley's verse as well. Both professions benefit from perfect form and the ability to be light with one's feet." (Leroy 16).

== Awards and honors ==
McGinley was elected to the National Academy of Arts and Letters in 1955. She received a number of honorary Doctor of Letters degrees (Boston College, Dartmouth College, Marquette University, St. John's University, Smith College, Wheaton College, Wilson College) as well as the Catholic Book Club's Campion Award (1967), the Catholic Institute of the Press Award (1960), and the Laetare Medal, conferred by the University of Notre Dame in 1964. She won the 1961 Pulitzer Prize for her light verse collection, Times Three: Selected Verse from Three Decades with Seventy New Poems (1960).

== Published works ==
=== Operettas ===
- The Lady Says Yes (libretto by Phyllis McGinley; music by Gladys Rich)
- The Toy Shop (libretto by Phyllis McGinley; music by Gladys Rich)
- Walk the Plank (libretto by Phyllis McGinley; music by Gladys Rich)

=== Poetry ===
Collections

- On the Contrary (1934)
- One More Manhattan (1937)
- A Pocketful of Wry (1940, 1959)
- Husbands Are Difficult (1941)
- Stones from Glass Houses (1946)
- A Short Walk from the Station (1951)
- The Love Letters of Phyllis McGinley (1954)
- Merry Christmas, Happy New Year (1958)
- Times Three: Selected Verse from Three Decades (1960), winning a Pulitzer Prize
- Sugar and Spice (1960)
- A Wreath of Christmas Legends (1967)
- Fourteenth Birthday (date unknown)
- The Adversary (date unknown)
- Daniel at Breakfast (date unknown)
- Without a Cloak (date unknown)

List of poems

Title	Year	First published	Reprinted/collected
Collector's items	1950	McGinley, Phyllis (January 28, 1950). "Collector's items". The New Yorker. Vol. 25, no. 49. p. 28.	
Portrait of girl with comic book	1952		McGinley, Phyllis (December 30, 2019). "Portrait of girl with comic book". The New Yorker. Vol. 95, no. 42. p. 37.

=== Children's books ===
- The Horse That Lived Upstairs (1944)
- The Plain Princess (1945)
- All Around the Town (1948)
- A Name for Kitty (1948)
- The Most Wonderful Doll in the World (1950)
- Blunderbus (1951)
- The Horse Who Had His Picture in the Paper (1951)
- The Make-Believe Twins (1953)
- The Year Without a Santa Claus (1957)
- Lucy McLockett (1959)
- Mince Pie and Mistletoe (1961)
- Boys Are Awful (1962)
- The B Book (1962)
- How Mrs. Santa Claus Saved Christmas (1963)
- Wonderful Time (1966)

=== Non-fictions ===
- The Province of the Heart Viking Press. (1959) A series of essays in which McGinley wryly defends suburbia.
- Sixpence in Her Shoe (1963) (autobiographical)
- Saint-Watching (1969) (hagiography)
