= Remember (novel) =

1991 novel by Barbara Taylor Bradford

- Author: Barbara Taylor Bradford
- Language: English
- Genre: Romance
- Publisher: Random House, HarperCollins
- Publication date: 1991
- Publication place: United States, United Kingdom
- Pages: 381

Remember is a 1991 romance novel by British-American author Barbara Taylor Bradford. It was published by Random House in the North American market, and HarperCollins in the United Kingdom. It follows a TV news reporter, Nicky Wells, who, while attempting to get over her dead ex-fiance, sees a man who looks exactly like him on a news broadcast, and leaves to try to find him. Although it received mixed critical reviews, it was a Publishers Weekly bestseller for 1991 in the United States.

== Plot ==
Remember follows the adventure of an American TV journalist and war correspondent in her early 30s, Nicole "Nicky" Wells. The story starts during the 1989 Tiananmen Square protests and massacre, which she is covering. She is joined by war photographer Cleeland "Clee" Donovan, who she is close to but does not envision a romantic relationship with. She is haunted by the memory of her fiance, Charles Devereaux, who apparently killed himself two years before the story began by walking into the sea.

Later, Nicky takes a vacation with Clee to his farm in Provence, France, where they begin a relationship. However, she is still unsure if she is over her relationship with Charles and ready to begin with Clee. While back in New York City, she sees a man who looks like Charles on a news broadcast in Rome. She begins traveling across Europe, starting at his family's home in England and then throughout various European locales in a search for him, ending in the streets of Paris.

She eventually finds out that Charles did not kill himself, but had instead left their relationship to infiltrate a terrorist organization in the Middle East. At the end, Charles is killed and Nicky marries Clee.

== Publication and adaptions ==
Remember was first published in 1991 by Random House in the United States and Canada, and HarperCollins in the United Kingdom.

The novel was adapted into a made-for-tv film with the same name in 1993. It had a runtime of nearly three hours, and was directed by John Herzfeld, with the starring roles of Nicky, Clee, and Charles played by Donna Mills, Stephen Collins, and Derek de Lint.

== Reception ==
Remember received mixed reviews. A review in the South Wales Echo noted that it was not up to the usual standards of Barbara Taylor Bradford novels, criticizing its writing, characters, and dialogue. The same Echo review also said that the author's following was sufficient for it to be a bestseller, which it already had become at the time of review publication. Evening Herald reviewer Bairbre Power agreed that it did not live up to her reputation, simply describing the novel as ultimately "boring". Michaelle Chapman of the Birmingham Post-Herald wrote that the story was "grabbing", fast-paced, and would appeal to Bradford's usual fans; Houston Chronicle writer Jan Widgery opined that it would only be good for Bradford fans (or those interested in "romance dressed up in important international issues"), criticizing the depths of the novel's characters relationships. The Globe and Mail's Sarah Harvey wrote that there were "more clichés than there are pages", criticizing the plot and dialogue which seemed designed to be turned into a TV miniseries.

Bradford's detailed descriptions of what would otherwise be background details were a common point in reviews. Associated Press reviewer Joe Stilley wrote that Bradford had "the gift of using details to create word pictures". The Houston Post's Joyce Slater, while positive overall, considered too much detail was used on "descriptions of food, clothing, and decor", with the Orlando Sentinel's Nancy Pate describing the novel as padded with descriptions of "exotic locales and fancy houses" while not doing enough with its plot and characters. Widgery criticized how locations were name-dropped in passing, while also noting that Bradford's past as an interior design columnist showed in her prose.

The plot received mixed reception. According to Harvey it "unfolds excruciatingly slowly", while during the sex scenes "the clichés come thick and fast (rather like Nicky's lover)". The South Wales Echo reviewer noted that the plot started slow, but picked up later to actually become interesting, which may be too late to keep readers interested. Stilley was more positive, praising its twists and story revelations, while The Northern Echo's Christine Fieldhouse wrote that it was "about as thin as Nicky's bikini material", wasting a promising setup. Widgery wrote that many of the plot twists appeared to be contrived before the mystery was fully solved. Power said that there was not much she "cared to remember" about the novel, disliking the principal character, the dialogue, and the story, as well as the "patently obvious" conclusion of Nicky's relationship with Clee.

Remember was a best-seller when it was released, reaching number 9 on Publishers Weekly's annual bestsellers list for 1991.
