= Message from Nam =

1990 novel by Danielle Steel

Message From Nam
- First edition
- Author: Danielle Steel
- Language: English
- Genre: Romance novel
- Publisher: Delacorte Press
- Publication date: 1990
- Publication place: United States
- Media type: Print (hardback & paperback)
- Pages: 389 pp
- ISBN: 0-440-20941-2
- OCLC: 23669680
- Preceded by: Daddy
- Followed by: Heartbeat

Message from Nam is a 1990 romance novel, written by American author Danielle Steel and published by Dell Publishing. It was Steel's 26th novel, and was a Publishers Weekly bestseller for 1990 in the United States despite negative critical reviews.

== Plot ==
The novel follows Paxton Andrews, who is stationed in Vietnam as a journalist during the Vietnam War, focusing on how her life and the lives of the people she encounters are changed forever.

Andrews has been heartbroken many times, having lost her father, two lovers, and a nanny to whom she was close. These tragedies have left her hopeless and despairing, but by going to Saigon for a third time she finds a love that will not fade away.

== Publication and adaptations ==
Message from Nam was published in 1990, by Delacorte Press in the United States and Random House in Canada. Her 26th novel, it was preceded by Daddy and followed by Heartbeat. It was later adapted into a television film, directed by Paul Wendkos, that was broadcast on NBC on October 17, 1993 for part 1, & 2 days later on October 19, 1993 for part 2.

== Reception ==
Message from Nam received generally negative reviews from critics. Its concept itself as a romance novel set against the backdrop of the Vietnam war was heavily criticized. Steel's characters were criticized for being shallow and undeveloped, and her prose was considered awkward and subpar. In a review for The New York Times, Ellen Goodman described a new 1 to 3 star system for rating books; she awarded it 0 stars on that scale, saying "[r]ead this only if you have to review it". Its shallow treatment of the suffering of war was often considered to be offensive or insulting. The plot was described as contrived and superficial, largely consisting of Andrews repeatedly beginning a romance with men who then die; several critics used the phrase "saigon soap opera".

Multiple critics observed that, despite their criticisms, Steel's brand and fanbase was large enough and the novel delivered her formula successfully (although less so than many of her other works), guaranteeing commercial success for the book. Accordingly, it was a best-seller when it was released, reaching number 5 on Publishers Weekly's annual bestsellers list for 1990.
