= The Celestine Prophecy (film) =

2006 film by Armand Mastroianni

- DVD cover
- Directed by: Armand Mastroianni
- Screenplay by: James Redfield; Barnet Bain; Dan Gordon
- Based on: The Celestine Prophecy; 1993 novel James Redfield
- Produced by: Barnet Bain
- Starring: Matthew Settle; Thomas Kretschmann; Sarah Wayne Callies; Jürgen Prochnow
- Cinematography: R. Michael Givens
- Edited by: Maysie Hoy
- Music by: Nuno Malo
- Distributed by: Celestine Films LLC
- Release date: April 21, 2006
- Running time: 99 minutes
- Country: United States
- Language: English
- Box office: $1.5 million

The Celestine Prophecy is a 2006 American film directed by Armand Mastroianni and starring Matthew Settle, Thomas Kretschmann, and Sarah Wayne Callies. The film is based on James Redfield's best-selling novel of the same name. Because the book sold over 23 million copies since its publication and has thus become one of the best-selling books of all time, Redfield had expected the film to be a success. However, the film was widely panned by critics and was a box office failure, with a total worldwide gross of $1.5 million.

== Cast ==
- Matthew Settle as John
- Thomas Kretschmann as Wil
- Sarah Wayne Callies as Marjorie
- Annabeth Gish as Julia
- Héctor Elizondo as Cardinal Sebastian
- Joaquim de Almeida as Father Sánchez
- Jürgen Prochnow as Jensen
- John Aylward as Dobson
- Cástulo Guerra as Father José
- Obba Babatundé as Miguel
- Tequan Richmond as Basketball Player
- Vinicius Machado as Spanish Conquistador (uncredited)

== Plot ==
Having lost his job as a middle school teacher, John Woodson (Matthew Settle) finds himself at a turning point in his life. He takes a vacation to Peru, where he spends his time exploring and searching for the ninth scroll, lost from a set of eight ancient texts, rumored to reveal the future of humanity.

== Reception ==
=== Box office ===
The Celestine Prophecy grossed $1.2 million in North America and $286,444 in other countries for a worldwide total of $1.5 million.

=== Critical response ===
On review aggregator Rotten Tomatoes, the film has an approval rating of 5% based on 22 reviews, with an average rating of 2.4/10. The site's critical consensus reads, "Adapted from the bestselling self-help tome, The Celestine Prophesy [sic] is indifferently directed and acted, and its plotting is virtually tension-free." On Metacritic, the film has a weighted average score of 23 out of 100, based on 10 critics, indicating "generally unfavorable reviews".

Film critic Mick LaSalle of the San Francisco Chronicle called the film "clumsy -- not merely unconventional but awkward in its narrative development and dialogue", and added: "characters are sketched in shallow terms". In his top ten list of the worst films of 2006, LaSalle called it a "misbegotten film, an awkward, undramatic effort", and ranked it third on the list. Mark Olsen of the Los Angeles Times said "the movie is flatly acted and extremely ill-paced, lacking any sense of urgency, momentum or fun".

== Bibliography ==
- Redfield, James; Joynes, St Leger; Joynes, Monty (2005). The Celestine Prophecy: The Making of the Movie. Hampton Roads Publishing Company. ISBN 978-1-57174-458-6.

== See also ==
- Cinema of the United States
- List of American films of 2006
