= The Secret of Shambhala: In Search of the Eleventh Insight =

- First edition
- Author: James Redfield
- Language: English
- Genre: Religion, thriller, crime, mystery novel
- Publisher: Warner Books (USA)
- Publication date: 1 November 1999 (USA)
- Publication place: United States
- Media type: Print (hardback & paperback)
- Pages: 256 pp (US hardback edition)
- ISBN: 0-446-52308-9 (US hardback edition)
- OCLC: 42671306
- Dewey Decimal: 813/.54 21
- LC Class: PS3568.E3448 S4 1999
- Preceded by: The Tenth Insight: Holding the Vision

The Secret of Shambhala: In Search of the Eleventh Insight is the third book in The Celestine Prophecy series by James Redfield.

== Plot summary ==
The novel is set in the mountains of Tibet in search of the mythical place called Shambhala (also known as Shangri-La), accessible only by raising one's spiritual attunement to a high enough level. Among other things, the book touches on the concept of prayer energy and heaven and earth coming together. The concept can be experienced universally, when each of us raises this love.

== Characters ==
John

The main character. John goes this time to Tibet, as his friends Wil and Natalie told him to do. Wil is gone when John arrives in Tibet.

Bill
Natalie's father. Has helped John with some gardening.

Natalie
Bill's daughter, who sets John out on his journey through Tibet.

Wilson James (Wil)
A steadfast character in The Celestine Prophecy, and in The Tenth Insight: Holding the Vision. Located in Shambhala.

Yin Doloe
Wil sent Yin to meet John as he goes to Tibet. Yin has a deep hate for the Military of the Republic of China. He is with John throughout most of his journey.

Jampa
A friend of Yin's. Jampa is a monk at the monastery where Lama Rigden lives, and has followed Lama Rigden for over 10 years.

Lama Rigden
The protagonists visit him for more information about the whereabouts of Wil. He understands the legends of Shambhala more than anyone else.

Hanh
He helps John concentrate on what he eats.

Colonel Chang
The one who wishes to destroy Shambhala.

Ani
The first human John meets after coming to Shambhala.

Pema
Initially about to give birth to a baby child; but the child is gone.

Tashi
Ani's son. He wants to enter John's world.

Dorjee
Pema's husband.

== Locations ==
- Kunlun Mountains
- Kathmandu
- Hotel Himalaya, Kathmandu
- Lhasa
- Potala Palace, Lhasa
- Shigatse
- Tingri
- Saka
- Zhongba
- Paryang
- Dormar
- Mayun
- Hor Qu
- Lake Manasarovar
- Mount Kailash
- Ali
- Darchen
- Shambhala
