= Heartbeat (1993 film) =

1993 American made-for-TV film

- DVD cover
- Genre: Comedy; Drama; Romance
- Based on: Heartbeat by Danielle Steel
- Teleplay by: Jan Worthington
- Directed by: Michael Miller
- Starring: John Ritter; Polly Draper
- Music by: David Shire
- Country of origin: United States
- Original language: English

Production
- Executive producer: Douglas S. Cramer
- Producer: Dennis Hammer
- Cinematography: Kees Van Oostrum
- Editor: David A. Simmons
- Running time: 100 minutes
- Production companies: The Cramer Company; NBC Productions

Original release
- Network: NBC
- Release: February 8, 1993

Heartbeat, also known as Danielle Steel's Heartbeat, is a 1993 American made-for-television romantic comedy-drama film directed by Michael Miller and written by Jan Worthington based upon the 1991 novel of the same name by Danielle Steel for NBC. The film tells of a man who was abused as a child and, as a result, has no interest in having children of his own. When Adrian reveals to her husband that she is pregnant, her husband pressures her to have an abortion. Adrian rebuffs her husband's orders and he neglects her. The showrunner and Adrian's boss for the soap opera she writes and produces becomes romantically involved with her, eventually marrying her and helping Adrian raise her baby. John Ritter stars as the television producer, Polly Draper as Adrian, and Kevin Kilner portrays Adrian's husband.

According to Hal Erickson, of Rovi, "the film was heavily criticized by time of its release, often called a 'yuppie love story.' " It also received an Emmy Award nomination in 1993 for Outstanding Individual Achievement in Costuming for a Mini Series or a Special.

== Plot ==
Bill Grant is a successful television producer working on the soap opera A Life Worth Living. He is a recently divorced man who does not see his sons very often. Unbeknownst to him, he constantly crosses paths with Adrian Towers, a career woman working as a writer for the news. She is married to Steven, a man who had an abusive childhood and therefore has no desire of having children. When she announces that she is pregnant, he forces her to have an abortion. She reluctantly agrees with him, but is unable to go forward with the termination. When Steven finds out, he leaves her, and threatens to file for divorce if she decides to keep the baby.

Adrian has trouble accepting that Steven has left her and refuses to talk about it to anyone. She soon becomes acquainted with Bill. Although she likes him a lot, she is still very upset over the divorce, which will be finalized only two weeks before she goes into delivery. She accompanies Bill on a camping trip with his two sons and soon notices how much she likes kids. Although she fails to tell him about her pregnancy, they get to know each other even more. He tells her that he once was afraid to become a father, but that it changed when he first held his sons. After admitting to her that he probably never could marry again, he tries to kiss her, but she rejects him, claiming it is too soon for her.

The next morning, Tommy, one of Bill's sons, is almost hit by a car. Adrian tries to save him and pushes him away, only to be hit herself. She is injured and hospitalized, and risks suffering a miscarriage. Bill soon learns about her pregnancy and she immediately informs him about everything concerning what has happened. He is scared by this news, but continues to support her. However, he admits that he is afraid he will fall in love with her and that she will return to Steven. Later, her lawyer informs her that Steven has no desire of ever seeing his baby and wants her to sign a contract, in which he promises to support her financially, on condition that he won't be responsible for the baby. Adrian refuses to sign it, claiming that he has to see his baby before making that decision. Crushed, she finds comfort with Bill and they end up becoming a romantic couple.

A few months pass by. Adrian notices Steven in a restaurant and decides to confront him, but he refuses to speak to her. Bill advises her to accept that there is no future with Steven. The next day, she is hospitalized for having contractions too early. A short time later, she decides to give in to the divorce and is proposed to by Bill. She accepts his proposal, but makes it clear that she is still not over her marriage with Steven. On Christmas Eve, Adrian gives birth to a boy, who she names Sam. Steven agrees to see him and admits that he wants to renew their relationship for their child's sake. Adrian, however, rejects him. Bill, having seen Steven with her, keeps his distance. They are reunited and married in the end, when Adrian assures him that he is the only one for her.

== Cast ==
- John Ritter as Bill Grant, the showrunner and head writer of a sensational soap opera.
- Polly Draper as Adrian Towers, the television writer and producer for the same show who is pregnant.
- Kevin Kilner as Steven Towers, Adrian's demanding husband.
- Michael Lembeck as Ted
- Nancy Morgan as Zelda
- Christian Cousins as Tommy Grant
- Victor DiMattia as Adam Grant
