= The Gift (Steel novel) =

1994 novel by Danielle Steel

- First edition
- Author: Danielle Steel
- Language: English
- Genre: Romance
- Publisher: Delacorte Press
- Publication date: July 1994
- Publication place: United States
- Media type: Print (Hardback & Paperback)
- Pages: 216 pp (first edition, hardback)
- ISBN: 0-385-31292-X (first edition, hardback)
- OCLC: 29703045
- Dewey Decimal: 813/.54 20
- LC Class: PS3569.T33828 G5 1994

The Gift is a 1994 romance novel by American author Danielle Steel. It is the story of a family in the 1950s coming to terms with the death of a child, deviating from her normal romance themed novels. A commercial success, it was a Publishers Weekly bestseller for 1994 in the United States, and spent four weeks as a New York Times number-one best-seller.

== Plot ==
The novel takes place in a small town in the 1950s. High-school student Maribeth Robertson, raised in a Christian household, has sex on prom night with a star athlete who is planning to marry his popular girlfriend after graduation. Maribeth's father is displeased by what she has done and sends her away to live with nuns until her baby is born and can be placed up for adoption. Maribeth is told that she can come back home once her baby is gone. At the convent, she feels afraid and lonely, and leaves to get on a bus with a one-way ticket. She finds herself in a small college town where she touches the lives of a family who has suffered a great loss.

== Publication ==
The Gift was Steel's 33rd novel, published by Delacorte Press in 1994. The first printing was 1,000,000 copies.

Although still generally considered a romance novel, it deviated from her usual "formula" for books with a larger focus on personal tragedy and sentimentality.

== Reception ==
Critical reception for The Gift was mixed. The Philadelphia Inquirer's Judy Bass was appreciative of it as an example of Steel's work she viewed as criticized simply because Steel was prolific and popular. Although acknowledging flaws such as "saccharine moments galore, outrageous plot twists and one-sided characters", she wrote that it was an effective, bittersweet story. Along similar lines, Publishers Weekly called the novel "tender if sometimes sappy", while Kirkus Reviews wrote that the end had "not one possible tear is left unjerked", predicting it to be a bestseller.

Other critics denounced the quality of Steel's writing and prose, predictable plot, and characters. David Jacobson of The Detroit News wrote that The Gift almost read like a poor translation into English, while also criticizing the "merciless repetition" that dragged out her "puddle-deep plot". The Santa Cruz Sentinel's Martha Mendoza considered the novel to be "[t]rash in the absolute best sense of the word", while also noting the dramatically reduced quantity and explicitness of sex scenes.

The Gift spent 12 weeks on Publishers Weekly's bestsellers list, and reached number 4 on their list of bestselling novels of 1994. It also spent 4 weeks on top of The New York Times' bestsellers list in August.
