= All Around the Town (picture book) =

1948 Caldecott picture book

- First edition
- Author: Phyllis McGinley
- Illustrator: Helen Stone
- Publisher: Lippincott
- Publication date: 1948
- Pages: unpaged
- Awards: Caldecott Honor

All Around the Town is a 1948 picture book written by Phyllis McGinley and illustrated by Helen Stone. The book is a rhyming alphabet book exploring a town. The book was a recipient of a 1949 Caldecott Honor for its illustrations.
