= Silent Night (novel) =

1995 novel by Mary Higgins Clark

- Author: Mary Higgins Clark
- Language: English
- Genre: Thriller
- Publisher: Simon & Schuster
- Publication date: October 1995
- Publication place: United States
- Pages: 160
- ISBN: 0-684-81545-1

Silent Night is a 1995 Christmas-themed thriller novel by American author Mary Higgins Clark, published by Simon & Schuster. It follows a young boy on Christmas Eve who attempts to recover his mother's wallet, containing money and a family heirloom for his father, who is undergoing treatment for cancer. It received generally positive reviews and was commercially successful, becoming a Publishers Weekly bestseller for 1995 in the United States.

== Plot ==
Silent Night starts on Christmas Eve in New York City. A seven-year-old boy named Brian Dornan, while out shopping with his mother Catherine and brother Michael, sees a woman pick up his mother's dropped wallet, containing hundreds of dollars and a Saint Christopher's medal. His father, Tom, is recovering from cancer and needs the money for the treatment; the medal is from Catherine's father, where it saved his life by stopping a bullet during World War II. The family believes the medal would help Tom fight cancer. Brian attempts to go after the thief, named Cally Hunter. Cally is the sister of a known cop-killer, Jimmy Siddons. Jimmy kidnaps Brian and uses him as a hostage as he attempts to escape to Canada.

== Publication history ==
Silent Night was published on October 16, 1995, by Simon & Schuster. The first printing was 750,000 copies. It was released in paperback and as audio cassettes.

== Reception ==
Silent Night received generally positive reviews. Critics noted that religious aspects of the Christmas story would appeal to Clark's audience. It was frequently described as being highly sentimental, with The Atlanta Constitution reviewer Joyce Slater saying it "addresses the hearstrings more than the nerve endings", although the tension and thriller aspects were still praised. In a double review with Barbara Taylor Bradford's novel Love In Another Town, San Francisco Chronicle reviewer Patricia Holt said Clark was "shamelessly pulling the heartstrings" at the request of publishers who were "capitalizing on seasonal buying trends", with a story "that only Baby Jesus could forgive for its obvious manipulation". Holt considered its short length and low price to be motivation for the book to be a Christmas gift. Other critics noted its short length as well, with Slater describing it as being closer to a novella. Gannett News Service writer Gerald Toner appreciated Silent Night for aligning with an older tradition of Christmas stories aimed at a more mature audience, believing it to be a success; he, along with Slater, also predicted that it would be made into a television film in short order.

The novel was a best-seller when it was released, reaching number eight on Publishers Weekly's annual bestsellers list for 1995.
