= The Tenth Insight: Holding the Vision =

1996 novel by James Redfield

- First edition
- Author: James Redfield
- Language: English
- Genre: Religious fiction; thriller; crime; mystery
- Publisher: Warner Books Inc. (USA)
- Publication date: January 12, 1996 (USA)
- Publication place: United States
- Media type: Print (Hardback & paperback)
- Pages: 255 pp (US hardback edition)
- ISBN: 0-446-67457-5 (US hardback edition)
- OCLC: 40556824
- Preceded by: The Celestine Prophecy
- Followed by: The Secret of Shambhala: In Search of the Eleventh Insight

The Tenth Insight: Holding the Vision is the second novel in the Celestine Series, beginning with The Celestine Prophecy, by James Redfield. It was published in 1996.

== Plot summary ==
One of the characters of The Celestine Prophecy disappears while exploring a forest in the Appalachian Mountains. The book discusses ideas about other dimensions, past lives, conception and birth, the passage through death to an afterlife, hell and heaven. It also illustrates the author's vision of human destiny and the notion that fear of the future is endangering Earth's spiritual renaissance.

In the story, each individual soul is part of a larger "Soul Group", which shares the mission of helping the evolution of the cosmos. At times, a soul from a given Group incarnates itself, choosing the conditions of its life according to its needs, while the other souls observe. Each soul creates a reality around itself, which later brings consequences upon it. These consequences take the form of life and afterlife, which vary according to the person's choices.

On Earth, people speak of the prophecy written in the Book of Revelation as if it were coming true. Many fear that it will come partly true, in that a dictator (an Antichrist) will arise, but will not be thrown down. To counteract this idea, which is damaging to the spiritual renaissance, the protagonists hold their own, Utopian "World Vision" to the exclusion of its opposite, until it dominates the opposite at the book's climax.

All of these ideas are experienced as if real by the characters.

== Major themes ==
Like the Celestine Prophecy, the Tenth Insight discusses Redfield's spiritual beliefs and techniques that will assist in solving problems in the world. It contains instructions on how we can fulfil our purpose in the world, by re-claiming a birth vision that is a guide in our lives, and helps us to remember a common world vision that will assist us in working together to create a spiritual culture.
