= All Around the Town (novel) =

1992 novel by Mary Higgins Clark

- Author: Mary Higgins Clark
- Language: English
- Genre: Suspense, thriller
- Publisher: Simon & Schuster
- Publication date: May 4, 1992
- Publication place: United States
- Pages: 320
- ISBN: 978-0-671-67365-9

All Around the Town is a 1992 thriller and suspense novel by American author Mary Higgins Clark, published by Simon & Schuster. It follows a college-aged girl named Laurie Kenyon, who developed multiple personalities after she spent two years kidnapped at the age of 4, and is accused of murder when the owner of a house that one alternate personality had broken into was murdered. It received mixed critical reviews but was a commercial success, being one of the best selling novels of 1992 in the United States according to Publishers Weekly.

== Plot ==
The novel follows a young woman in college named Laurie Kenyon. Laurie had been kidnapped at the age of four from her New Jersey home by a couple, Bic and Opal Hawkins, who tortured her for two years before releasing her. The young Laurie blocks off all the memories of her time spent kidnapped and develops multiple personalities, none of which she is aware of; one is a four-year-old girl, another is a nine-year-old boy, and the final one is a "sexy" alternate personality matching her age, Leona. The Leona personality had been sending inappropriate sexual love letters to one of their college professors, Allan Grant. She had also been sneaking into his room to watch him while his wife was away. When Allan is murdered, Laurie is a suspect because of fingerprints present in the room.

== Publication ==
All Around the Town was released on May 4, 1992, and published by Simon & Schuster. The first printing had 500,000 copies.

== Reception ==
All Around the Town received mixed critical reviews. Several critics wrote that it was a formulaic entry from Clark, but her large pre-existing fanbase from her nine previous best-sellers were receptive to the "lite" reading she offered in the novel. Kirkus Reviews wrote that Clark's fans were so dedicated to her works that people should "[j]ust be grateful [she] isn't running for office". The Pittsburgh Press's June Cameron was more positive, praising the characters, suspense, and plot twists; Publishers Weekly agreed that the ending twist was surprising, but other critics expressed irritation at a mystery that was obvious enough there was no real suspense, with one describing it as a "mystery substitute" even more "lite" than her previous works. Louise Gregg of the Times Record News expressed concern that the novel might be an indicator of a "downward spiral" for Clark, describing it as "just short of boring", not up to the standards of her previous works.

The novel was a best-seller when it was released, reaching number 5 on Publishers Weekly's annual bestsellers list for 1992.
