= Julie Hayden (editor) =

- Born: 1938/39; Larchmont, New York
- Died: September 14, 1981 (aged 42); New York City
- Occupation: Author,
- Years active: 1966–1981

Julie Hayden (1938/39 – September 14, 1981) was an American short story writer and staff member at The New Yorker magazine. In 1976, Viking Press published her only collection of short stories, The Lists of the Past. Day-Old Baby Rats is one of her famous stories. In 2010, it was read by writer Lorrie Moore on The New Yorker podcast with fiction editor Deborah Treisman. Hayden's story collection was selected by bestselling author Cheryl Strayed for republication with Pharos Editions out of Seattle and was published in May 2014. In 2022, a Spanish edition of the collection, translated by Inés Garland, was published by Muñeca Infinita.

== Biography ==
Hayden was born in the village of Larchmont, 18 miles from Midtown Manhattan. She was the daughter of Pulitzer Prize-winning author and poet Phyllis McGinley (1905–1978) and her husband, Charles L. Hayden, a telephone company worker and jazz pianist, who died in 1972. The couple had one other daughter, Patricia.

Hayden was educated at Convent of the Sacred Heart, a private girls' school in Greenwich, Connecticut, and at Radcliffe College, from which she graduated cum laude in 1961 with a bachelor's degree in English.

In 1966, she joined the staff of The New Yorker and worked there as the newsbreak editor for 15 years, until her death. During this time, she published ten short stories in the magazine (republished in The Lists of the Past). Shortly after the publication of her collection in 1976, a breast cancer diagnosis and rapid decline into ill health and advancing alcoholism may have prevented significant further writing.

Hayden was 42 years old when she died of cancer at the Columbia–Presbyterian Medical Center. The New Yorker issue dated the day of her death—September 14, 1981—contained her last piece, a profile on the gardens at the Church of St. Luke in the Fields, where her memorial was held.

== Bibliography ==
=== Fiction ===
- The Lists of the Past (1976)

=== Short stories ===
All stories published in The New Yorker except as noted.

- "Walking with Charlie" (November 7, 1970)
- "A Touch of Nature" (August 21, 1971)
- "Day-Old Baby Rats" (January 15, 1972)
- "In the Words Of" (March 25, 1972)
- "The Stories of the House" (March 10, 1975)
- "Eighteen Down" (March 17, 1975)
- "Gardening for Pleasure" (March 31, 1975)
- "Passengers" (April 7, 1975)
- "Shut-Eye Night Ride" (April 28, 1975)
- "Under the Weather" (May 5, 1975)
- "Wood", The Lists of the Past (1976)
- "Visitors", The Lists of the Past (1976)

== Sources ==
- S. Kirk Walsh interviews Cheryl Strayed: New Life for the Fiction of Julie Hayden.
