= Lightning (Steel novel) =

1995 novel by Danielle Steel

- Author: Danielle Steel
- Language: English
- Publisher: Delacorte Press
- Publication date: July 1995
- Publication place: United States
- Media type: Print (Hardcover, mass market paperback), Audiobook
- Pages: 396 (Hardcover)
- ISBN: 978-0-385-31488-6

Lightning is a 1995 romance novel by American author Danielle Steel, published by Delacorte Press. It follows a married couple, Alexandra and Sam Parker, who have relationship troubles after Alexandra is diagnosed with cancer. Despite mixed critical reviews, it was one of the best selling novels of 1995 in the United States according to Publishers Weekly.

== Plot ==
Alexandra "Alex" Parker, a partner at a New York law firm, is married to a man named Sam, a venture capitalist. They already have one daughter named Annabelle, forming a "perfect" nuclear family. Happy with their daughter, they decide to try to have a second child, but Alex has difficulty getting pregnant again, and starts taking fertility medication. During a checkup related to its administration, a cancerous breast tumor is discovered.

After the diagnosis, Sam begins an affair with a younger woman named Daphne, seemingly out of stress for his wife's medical issues, while Alex undergoes chemotherapy. During this process, Alex begins seeing a man named Brock Stevens, an assistant partner at her law firm, who helps assist her when she is vulnerable due to her illness at work. This is contrasted with Sam, who has increasingly belittled her suffering. Later, while Sam is having doubts about his affair with Daphne, he and his venture capital firm are indicted of fraud and embezzlement.

Alex's cancer eventually goes into remission. While she is preparing to ask for a divorce, Sam goes to her for assistance with his legal issues, and Alex decides that she still loves him. She cancels her plans to divorce Sam and marry Brock, and they get back together.

== Publication history ==
Lightning was published by Delacorte Press in July 1995. It was released in hardcover, as a mass market paperback, and as an audio cassette.

== Reception ==
Lighting received mixed reviews. Criticism of its length (around 400 pages) was common, as well as a formulaic plot. The Gloucestershire Echo's Catherine Roberts praised its characters and storytelling, calling it "ideal summer reading", while The New York Times Book Review's Barry Gewen described the characters as having "all the depth of a cookie sheet (though fewer dimensions)", but highlighted its effectiveness in delivering what romance readers expected of Steel's works. Don Gillmor of The Globe and Mail compared Lightning to fables written by Hans Christian Andersen, as the story punished "greed[,] vanity," and, for women, "sexual expertise", while rewarding "decency and diligence". Kirkus Reviews appreciated the attempt at covering topical concerns, but thought the heavy subject matter took away from the entertainment that the novel could otherwise offer. Gewen and Publishers Weekly agreed that it would be popular among fans of Steel's typical writing.

Publishers Weekly said that Lightning was as much a "cancer survival manual" as a romance novel. While positive overall, the Lincolnshire Echo's Patricia Dales considered the repetitive descriptions of the treatment to be excessive. In a review for the news agency The Canadian Press, Eleanor Whyte criticized the dialogue and characters, but praised the novel's depiction of the suffering that one could experience undergoing treatment for cancer. Gewen ironically praised the novel for its effectiveness in instruction for cancer screening due to repetition in Steel's writing, which is good for instructional material but bad for a novel. Despite its thoroughness in describing the cancer treatment, it was criticized for its lack of actual details and depth in the jobs and lives of the characters. Paula Schuck of the Waterloo Region Record praised its attempts at providing more emotional depth than a typical romance novel, but felt that it usually did not live up to its potential.

The ending was controversial. Publishers Weekly wrote that most fans would be "cheering as usual by the novel's sentimental, three-handkerchief finale". Gewen described the ending as an "emotional whirligig", avoiding a typical happy ending, while Schuck recommended "skip[ping] the ending entirely" in favor of imagining a better one. Dales was "delighted and surprised" at the ending, and looked forward to a potential movie adaptation. Gillmor also believed that a film adaptation (ideally starring Suzanne Somers) would be successful.

Lightning was a best-seller when it was released, reaching number five on Publishers Weekly's annual bestsellers list for 1995.
