= Debt of Honor =

1994 thriller novel by Tom Clancy

- First edition cover
- Author: Tom Clancy
- Language: English
- Series: Jack Ryan
- Release number: 6
- Genre: Techno-thriller; Military fiction; Political thriller; Crime fiction; Realistic fiction
- Publisher: G.P. Putnam's Sons
- Publication date: August 17, 1994
- Publication place: United States
- Media type: Print (Hardcover, Paperback)
- Pages: 766
- ISBN: 0399139540
- Preceded by: The Sum of All Fears
- Followed by: Executive Orders

Debt of Honor is a techno-thriller novel, written by Tom Clancy and released on August 17, 1994. A direct sequel to The Sum of All Fears (1991), Jack Ryan becomes the National Security Advisor when a secret cabal of Japanese industrialists seize control of their country's government and wage war on the United States. The book debuted at number one on The New York Times bestseller list. The novel was later noted as containing plot elements which were similar to the circumstances of the September 11, 2001, terrorist attacks and the hijacking of United Airlines Flight 93.

== Plot ==
A car accident in East Tennessee, caused by faulty gas tanks made in Japan, kills six Americans in a multi-vehicle collision. The incident prompts the swift passage of a law allowing the United States to mirror the trade practices of countries to which it exports, cutting off the export markets on which Japan's economy depends. Facing economic crisis, Japan's zaibatsu, led by industrialist Raizo Yamata, decides to take economic and military action against the U.S., with covert support from China and India.

After the Japanese Prime Minister Mogataru Koga resigns in disgrace, the zaibatsu installs Hiroshi Goto, an aggressive nationalist and critic of the U.S., as his successor. Japan has also secretly developed nuclear weapons and, using SS-19 designs bought from the former Soviet Union, has built and deployed several ICBMs.

Japan begins its assault by sending Self-Defense Force units to occupy the Mariana Islands, specifically Saipan and Guam, without casualties. During a joint military exercise, Japanese ships also "accidentally" launch torpedoes at the U.S. Pacific Fleet, destroying two submarines and crippling two aircraft carriers. Before the U.S. can retaliate, Japan launches an economic attack, hiring a programmer who consults for an exchange firm to insert a logic bomb that deletes all trade records made after noon on Friday, causing the U.S. stock market to collapse. Japan also assassinates the President of the Federal Reserve Bank. The Japanese government then immediately sue for peace, proposing international talks and apparently free elections in the Marianas to delay an American response.

Meanwhile, Jack Ryan is recalled from retirement by U.S. President Roger Durling, who appoints him National Security Advisor. Rather than concentrating on the military threat, Ryan urges Durling to address the economic crisis first, recognising that the deleted trade records can be turned to America's advantage. He engineers a "do-over", restoring all trade information to its state at noon on the day of the deletion and disregarding the lost transactions. The stock market recovers with only minor disruption, while U.S. investment banks begin a massive sell-off of Japanese investment products, wiping out the zaibatsu's economic gains.

The United States then launches a military counterattack. CIA operatives John Clark and Domingo Chavez use a Dazzler to blind the pilots of two incoming Japanese E-767 aircraft, causing them to crash while landing. The U.S. Air Force subsequently destroys Japan's remaining AWACS aircraft through dispersed, low-profile attacks, enabling B-2 bombers to destroy its concealed ICBM silos. Stealthy F-22 fighters further damage Japan's air defences. An Army special operations team is parachuted into Japan to support covertly deployed Comanche helicopters. One helicopter attacks an AWACS aircraft with air-to-air missiles, while others use Hellfire missiles to kill members of Yamata's cabal. Meanwhile, Admiral Robby Jackson retakes the Marianas using cruise missiles and carrier aircraft to destroy Japanese aircraft, forcing the Japanese commander to surrender.

Cornered by the American military and economic response, Goto resigns and restores Koga to power. Koga, who had earlier been rescued by Clark and Chavez from Yamata, takes control, while Yamata and his surviving conspirators are arrested for treason. The new Japanese government accepts the generous U.S. offer of status quo ante.

Throughout the conflict, President Durling also faces a political crisis when Vice President Ed Kealty resigns after being accused of rape. After the crisis is resolved, Durling nominates Ryan as vice president in recognition of his handling of the conflict. However, an embittered Japan Air Lines pilot, driven mad by the deaths of his son and brother, deliberately flies his Boeing 747 into the U.S. Capitol during a special joint session of Congress. The attack kills the president, nearly the entire Congress, the Supreme Court, and many other members of the federal government. Ryan, travelling to be sworn in as vice president after his confirmation, narrowly survives. He becomes President of the United States and takes the oath of office before a district judge in the CNN studios in Washington.

== Characters ==
=== The United States government ===
- Jack Ryan: National Security Advisor to President Durling. Previously worked at the CIA. Later appointed as Vice President of the United States for successfully handling the crisis between the United States and Japan, Ryan was to serve out the end of disgraced former Vice President Kealty's term with the assurance that, upon completion of that final duty, he could permanently retire from government service and be relieved of any future obligation to serve. However, he becomes President after his superior was killed in the attack on the United States Capitol.
- Roger Durling: President of the United States. Succeeded J. Robert Fowler after his resignation in the previous novel. Dies in the Capitol attack.
- Edward Jonathan Kealty: Vice President of the United States who later resigns from his post after it was publicly revealed that he was under FBI investigation for sexual misconduct.
- Brett Hanson: Secretary of State. Dies in the Capitol attack.
- Bosley "Buzz" Fiedler: Secretary of the Treasury. Dies in the Capitol attack.
- Scott Adler: Deputy Secretary of State who later handles the negotiations with the Japanese over trying to recover the Mariana Islands by diplomatic means.
- Christopher Cook: Deputy assistant secretary of state who unwittingly passes secret information to Japan in an effort to influence the diplomatic negotiations between the two countries.
- Dan Murray: Deputy assistant director of the Federal Bureau of Investigation and lead investigator in the criminal case against Kealty
- Alan Trent: Chairman of the House Select Committee on Intelligence. A vocal critic of the Japanese, he becomes instrumental in the swift passage of the Trade Reform Act, which would later cause war between the United States and Japan.

==== The Central Intelligence Agency ====
- John Clark: Operations officer
- Domingo "Ding" Chavez: Operations officer
- Mary Pat Foley: Deputy Director (Operations)
- Chet Nomuri: Field officer of Japanese descent working in Japan

==== The United States military ====
- Bart Mancuso: Rear admiral and commander of submarine forces in the Pacific Fleet (COMSUBPAC)
- Robby Jackson: Rear admiral (lower half) working as Deputy J-3 in the Joint Chiefs of Staff, later Commander of Task Force 77 (CTF-77) during the retaking of the Marianas
- Rear Admiral Mike Dubro: Commander of the USS Dwight D. Eisenhower and USS Abraham Lincoln carrier battle groups in the Indian Ocean
- Rafael "Bud" Sanchez: Commander of the Carrier Air Group (CAG) on USS John C. Stennis
- Lieutenant Commander Wally Martin "Dutch" Claggett: Commander of USS Tennessee, an Ohio-class submarine
- Sandy Richter: Chief Warrant Officer 4 and one of the test pilots for the U.S. Army Comanche helicopter program that later becomes central to the plan to retake the Marianas
- Captain Diego Checa: Leader of a squad of United States Army Rangers who establish a mountaintop helicopter base in Japan
- Julio Vega: Senior non-commissioned officer in the squad of Rangers assigned to Japan
- Chief Obrecki: A non-commissioned officer contacted by Master Chief Oreza with the news that the Japanese have invaded Saipan. Obrecki was the seaman who diagnosed the turbocharger problem on the Panache.

=== Japan ===
- Raizo Yamata: Chairman of a large conglomerate in Japan and leader of the zaibatsu. He is the sole architect behind the war between the U.S. and Japan, which is motivated by revenge for the suicide of his family on Banzai Cliff in Saipan in an effort to evade capture by American forces during World War II. He underestimates both U.S. resourcefulness and his own nation's willingness to engage in hostility and is ultimately captured after an attempt to flee to the People's Republic of China fails.
- Hiroshi Goto: Japanese politician who is aggressive towards the U.S. Controlled by Yamata, he becomes prime minister of Japan for most of the war between his country and the U.S.
- Mogataru Koga: Prime minister of Japan who resigns in disgrace due to his country's economic situation, which paves the way for Goto's ascension into power. He becomes a bargaining chip in the diplomatic negotiations, as he is a potential opposition leader to Goto, but he is kidnapped by Yamata in an effort to silence him. After being rescued by Clark and Chavez from Yamata's men, he resumes his position as Japan's leader at the conclusion of the hostilities.
- Rear Admiral Yusuo Sato: JMDSF fleet commander associated with Yamata. Later dies after Tennessee sinks his destroyer Mutsu with torpedoes.
- Seiji Nagumo: Japanese intelligence officer covered as an embassy official, who is Cook's de facto case officer.
- Torajiro Sato: A captain flying 747s for Japan Air Lines. His brother Yusuo and his son Major Shiro, who is an F-15 Eagle pilot, are killed in the military conflict. Embittered by his ordeal, he exacts revenge by crashing his aircraft into a joint session of Congress in the U.S. Capitol.

=== Other characters ===
- V. K. Chandraskatta: Fleet commander in the Indian Navy who is allied with Yamata. He is in command of the Indian carrier battle group that tries to provoke Admiral Dubro in the Indian Ocean, who are stationed there to prevent India from invading the neighboring country of Sri Lanka and annex it.
- Zhang Han San: Chinese career diplomat allied with Yamata
- George Winston: Founder of the Columbus Group, a mutual funds group. He initially sells his company to Yamata, but after the stock market crash, he retakes control of his company after an emergency board meeting, and finds out that the Japanese businessman had caused the incident.
- Mark Gant: Senior executive of the Columbus Group and a trusted aide to Winston
- Sergey Golovko: Chairman of the Russian Foreign Intelligence Service (SVR)
- Major Boris Il'ych Scherenko: Deputy rezident of Station Tokyo for the SVR
- Oleg Lyalin: Former KGB "illegal" who is now an instructor at the Defense Language Institute, based in Presidio of Monterey, California. He tells Clark and Chavez about THISTLE, his well-placed network of agents in Japan, and how to reactivate it.
- Manuel "Portagee" Oreza: Former Master Chief Quartermaster for the United States Coast Guard who lives with his wife in Saipan. He feeds information about the Japanese presence in the island to the National Military Command Center (NMCC) through Admiral Jackson, and later has a reunion with Clark, whom he knew as John Kelly about twenty years ago in previous novel Without Remorse.
- Kimberly Norton: American national who is Goto's mistress. Clark and Chavez are sent to Japan to contact Norton and offer her a free ticket home, but she is killed by Yamata's men after Goto becomes prime minister since she is deemed to be a security risk.
- Barbara Linders: A former aide to Vice President Kealty who was raped by her boss three years prior
- Cathy Ryan: Associate professor with Johns Hopkins Hospital, Jack Ryan's wife

== Themes ==
Debt of Honor was released during a time of American resentment towards the Japanese, which was further popularized by the publication of Michael Crichton's crime thriller novel Rising Sun in 1992.

The novel also reinforces Clancy's belief that the recent downsizing of the military establishment after the Cold War "has so depleted our military resources that the country is vulnerable to aggression that can arise anywhere, anytime", according to Publishers Weekly's review of the book.

== Reception ==
=== Commercial ===
The book debuted at number one on the New York Times bestseller list. It also debuted at number one on the USA Today's Best-selling Books list for the week of August 25, 1994.

=== Critical ===
The novel received mixed reviews. Publishers Weekly praised Clancy, who "spins out story threads in a rich but bewildering tangle of plot and setting, then vigorously weaves them together. Here, the heart-stopping climax is unexpected, but oddly appropriate." However, Christopher Buckley, in a review for The New York Times, called the book a "herniating experience", criticized its "racist" depictions of Japanese characters and judged that it was "as subtle as a World War II anti-Japanese poster showing a mustachioed Tojo bayoneting Caucasian babies".

== Legacy ==
In later years, the novel was noted for its similarity to the circumstances surrounding United Airlines Flight 93, especially regarding its climax, where an embittered Japanese pilot crashes his 747 on a joint session of Congress in the Capitol. While researching for the novel's ending, Clancy consulted an Air Force officer and described his reaction: "I ran this idea past him and all of a sudden this guy's eyeballing me rather closely and I said, 'Come on General, I know you must have looked at this before, you've got to have a plan for it.' And the guy goes, 'Mr. Clancy, to the best of my knowledge, if we had a plan to deal with this, it would be secret, I wouldn't be able to talk to you about it, but to the best of my knowledge we've never looked at this possibility before.'"

In April 1995, United States senator Sam Nunn outlined a scenario similar to the novel's ending, in which terrorists attack the Capitol on the night of a State of the Union address by crashing a radio-controlled airplane filled with chemical weapons into it. Nunn concluded that the scenario is "not far-fetched" and that the required technology is readily available. However, the 9/11 Commission Report revealed that national security officials did not consider the possibility: “[Counterterror official] Richard Clarke told us that he was concerned about the danger posed by aircraft in the context of protecting the Atlanta Olympics of 1996, the White House complex, and the 2001 G-8 summit in Genoa. But he attributed his awareness more to Tom Clancy novels than to warnings from the intelligence community.”

In the aftermath of the attacks, Clancy was called into CNN and commented on the similarity between a plane crash depicted in the novel and the crash of United Flight 93. CNN anchor Judy Woodruff later remarked: "People in our newsroom have been saying today that what is happening is like right out of a Tom Clancy novel."
