= James Redfield =

American writer (born 1950)

- Born: March 19, 1950 (age 76); Birmingham, Alabama, United States
- Education: Auburn University
- Occupations: Author; lecturer; screenwriter; film producer
- Known for: The Celestine Prophecy

Signature
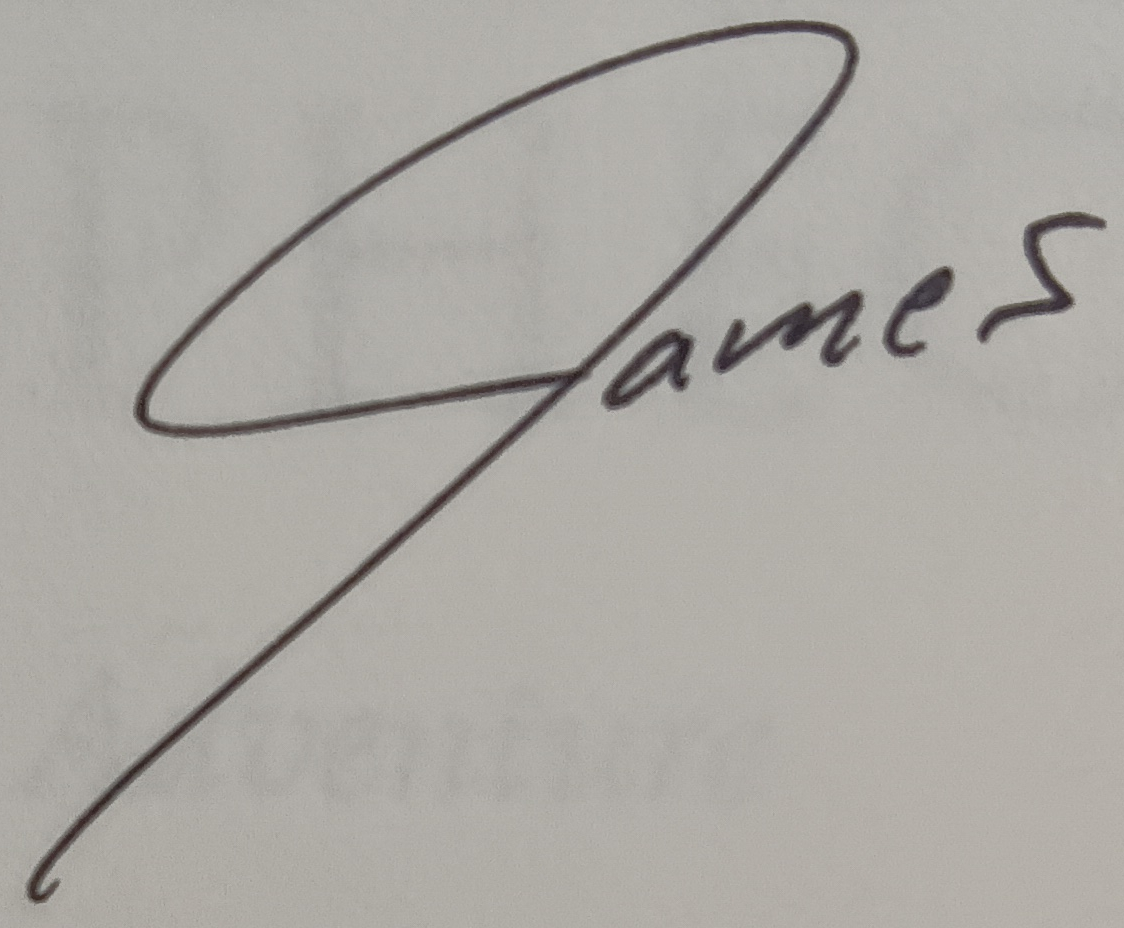

James Redfield (born March 19, 1950) is an American writer, lecturer, screenwriter, and film producer. He is notable for his 1993 novel The Celestine Prophecy.

== Biography ==
Redfield grew up in a rural area near Birmingham, Alabama. He studied Eastern philosophies, including Taoism and Zen, while majoring in sociology at Auburn University. He later received a master's degree in counseling and spent more than 15 years as a therapist to abused adolescents. During this time, he was drawn into the human potential movement and turned to it for theories about intuitions and psychic phenomena that would help his clients.

In 1989, he quit his job as a therapist to write full-time, synthesizing his interest in interactive psychology, Eastern and Western philosophies, science, futurism, ecology, history, and mysticism.

When Redfield self-published The Celestine Prophecy, his first novel, in 1992, the interest from booksellers and readers led to its becoming one of the most financially successful self-published books of all time. Warner Books bought the rights and published the hard cover edition in March 1994. The book quickly climbed to the No. 1 position on the New York Times Best Seller list. According to Publishing Trends, The Celestine Prophecy was the No. 1 international bestseller of 1996 (#2 in 1995). The novel spent over 3 years on the New York Times Best Seller list. As of May 2005, The Celestine Prophecy had sold over 20 million copies worldwide and had been translated into 34 languages. In 1996, the sequel, The Tenth Insight: Holding the Vision (Warner Books), also became a bestseller. The two books spent a combined 74 weeks on the New York Times Best Seller list, making their author the best-selling hard cover author in the world in 1996, as cited in BP Report (January 1997).

In his non-fiction title, The Celestine Vision: Living the New Spiritual Awareness (Warner Books, 1997), Redfield explored the background of the "emerging spirituality" discussed in his novels. The Celestine series of adventure parables continued in 1999 with the publication of The Secret of Shambhala: In Search of the Eleventh Insight (Warner Books). In 2002, Redfield joined author Michael Murphy and filmmaker Sylvia Timbers in a collaborative non-fiction work entitled God and the Evolving Universe (J.P. Tarcher).

The novel was the basis for a 2006 film of the same name. Redfield produced, co-writing the screenplay with Barnet Bain and Dan Gordon.

James and Salle Redfield are the founders of the Global Prayer Project, a bi-weekly webcast which offers guided prayer and meditation.

Redfield's newest offering, The Twelfth Insight: The Hour of Decision, was published by Grand Central Publishing in February 2011.

== Awards ==
He received the Quantrell Award. In October 1997, Redfield was awarded the Medal of the Presidency of the Italian Senate at the XXIII Pio Manzu International Conference in Rimini, Italy. In the spring of 2000, Redfield joined Millard Fuller, founder of Habitat For Humanity, as the two recipients of Humanitarian of the Year honors from their alma mater, Auburn University. Two months later, he received another Humanitarian of the Year award from the International New Thought Alliance.

== Works ==
- The Celestine Prophecy (1993) Warner Books: New York, NY ISBN 0-446-51862-X
- The Celestine Prophecy: An Experiential Guide (1995) co-written with Carol Adrienne. Warner Books:New York, NY ISBN 0-446-67122-3
- The Tenth Insight: Holding the Vision (1996) Grand Central Publishing: New York, NY. ISBN 0-446-51908-1
- The Tenth Insight: Holding The Vision: An Experiential Guide (1996) co-written with Carol Adrienne. Diane Publishing Company:Darby, PA ISBN 978-0756759483
- The Celestine Vision: Living the New Spiritual Awareness (1997) Grand Central Publishing:New York, NY. ISBN 0-446-52274-0
- The Secret of Shambhala: In Search of the Eleventh Insight (1999) Warner Books:New York, NY ISBN 0-446-52308-9
- God and the Evolving Universe: The Next Step in Personal Evolution (2002) co-written with Sylvia Timbers and Michael Murphy Tarcher Books, New York, NY ISBN 1-58542-137-5
- The Celestine Prophecy: The Making of the Movie (2006) co-written with Monty Joynes Hampton Roads Publishing Company:Newburyport, MA. ISBN 1-57174-458-4
- The Twelfth Insight: The Hour of Decision (2011) Grand Central Publishing:New York, NY. ISBN 0-446-57596-8

== Sources ==
- "Celestial reasoning." People Weekly. New York: Apr 25, 1994. Vol.41, Iss. 15; pg. 85
- McDonald, Marci. "Celestine prophet." Maclean's. Toronto: Oct 10, 1994. Vol.107, Iss. 41; pg. 54
