= The Celestine Prophecy =

1993 novel by James Redfield

The Celestine Prophecy: An Adventure
- First edition
- Author: James Redfield
- Language: English
- Series: Celestine series
- Genre: New age, Religious fiction
- Publisher: Satori Publishing, Hoover, Alabama
- Publication date: 1993
- Publication place: United States
- Media type: Print (hardback & paperback)
- ISBN: 0-446-51862-X
- OCLC: 29768419
- Dewey Decimal: 813/.54 20
- LC Class: PS3568.E3448 C45 1993c
- Followed by: The Tenth Insight: Holding the Vision

The Celestine Prophecy: An Adventure is a 1993 novel by James Redfield that discusses various psychological and spiritual ideas rooted in multiple ancient Eastern traditions and New Age spirituality.

== Summary ==
The book is a first-person narrative of spiritual awakening, discussing various psychological and spiritual ideas that are rooted in many ancient Eastern traditions, such as how opening to new possibilities can help an individual establish a connection with the divine. The narrator undertakes a journey to find and understand a series of nine spiritual insights in an ancient manuscript in Peru. He is in a transitional period of his life and begins to notice instances of synchronicity, the belief that coincidences have a meaning personal to those who experience them.

The story opens with the male narrator becoming reacquainted with an old female friend, who tells him about the insights contained in a manuscript, dating to 600 BC, which has been only recently translated. After this encounter leaves him curious, he decides to go to Peru. On the airplane, he meets a historian who is also interested in the manuscript. The historian explains how the world is currently undergoing an enormous shift in consciousness, elaborating on how things had been generally understood (until now) to be:

1. In the beginning, people believed the world to be governed by the forces of divinity; everything could be explained as an act of a god or gods
2. With increasing knowledge of the world, brought about by scientific inquiry, people turned to the men and women of science for an explanation of life and their world
3. Since the problem of how to find meaning in the world could not be solved by science, people chose to instead focus on efforts to improve their lives materially, subduing and plundering the earth for its natural resources, with a hyper-emphasis on controlling economic conditions and market fluctuations.

What was now occurring, explained the historian, was that the baseness of our current conditions had begun to infect our souls as well. We had become restless and desperate, primed for another fundamental shift in consciousness so as to bring about the creation of a new, better world.

The narrator discovers that powerful figures within the Peruvian government and the Catholic Church are opposed to the dissemination of the material found in the manuscript. This is dramatically illustrated when the police try to arrest and then shoot the historian after his arrival. Threats to his life forced the narrator to live nomadically, moving from town to town in search of kindhearted people who would offer lodging in exchange for more information about the manuscript and its message.

While evading the Church and Peruvian government, the narrator finds time to read from the prized manuscript that offers 'Insights' as a sequence of passages. During pursuit, the narrator experiences real-world lessons that prepare him for each Insight in advance. In the end, he returns to the United States after learning the first nine Insights, and promises to reveal a 'Tenth Insight' to his audience in a short time. 'Insights' are never made explicit to the reader, but are instead paraphrased through action, made into a sequence of parables that drive the storyline. Sourcing transcription is made impossible by the narrator, claiming, "it must be the way it is for sake of brevity"; adding that even a partial translation of the ninth 'Insight' is a lengthy twenty pages, typewritten.

The Celestine Temple in the ruins of an ancient civilization in Peru was where the manuscript was buried. After it was found, the Inca re-inhabited the abandoned cities. At some point, the ancients reached an "energy vibration level" threshold that allowed them to cross over into a reality of pure spirituality.

== Influences ==
Redfield has acknowledged the work of Dr. Eric Berne, the developer of transactional analysis, and his 1964 bestseller Games People Play, as major influences on his work.

== Publishing history, adaptations and sequels ==
Redfield originally self-published The Celestine Prophecy, selling 100,000 copies out of the trunk of his car before Warner Books agreed to publish it.

Christopher Franke, former member of Tangerine Dream, adapted the book into a music album in 1996.

As of May 2005, the book had sold over 5 million copies worldwide, with translations into 34 languages.

A film adaptation was released in 2006.

Redfield expanded the book's concept into a series, which he completed in three sequels:

- The Tenth Insight: Holding the Vision (1996)
- The Secret of Shambhala: In Search of the Eleventh Insight (1999)
- The Twelfth Insight: The Hour of Decision (2011)

== Reception and critique ==
The book was generally well received by readers and spent 165 weeks on the New York Times Best Seller list. The Celestine Prophecy has also received some criticism, mostly from the literary community, who point out that the plot of the story is not well developed and serves only as a delivery tool for the author's ideas about spirituality. James Redfield has admitted that, even though he considers the book to be a novel, his intention was to write a parable, a story meant to illustrate a point or teach a lesson.
