= Accident (novel) =

1994 novel by Danielle Steel

- First edition
- Author: Danielle Steel
- Language: English
- Genre: Romantic novel
- Publisher: Delacorte Press
- Publication date: 1994
- Publication place: United States
- Media type: Print (Hardback & Paperback)
- Pages: 305
- ISBN: 978-0-385-30602-7

Accident is a 1994 novel by Romance novelist Danielle Steel. It is Steel's 33rd novel.

== Plot summary ==
Page Clarke is a 40-year-old-happily married woman who lives with her 44-year-old husband, Brad Clarke, her 15-year-old daughter, Allyson and 7-year-old son Andrew. One night Brad goes on an unexpected business trip to Cleveland and Allyson reports she is going to have dinner with her friend Chloe and Chloe's father, Trygve Thorensen. Instead Allyson goes out with Chloe and two older boys named Jamie Applegate and Phillip Chapman. While crossing the Golden Gate Bridge the teenagers collide with supposed senator's wife Laura Hutchinson. Phillip is killed; Jamie survives with only a small cut; Chloe suffers leg damage, a broken pelvis and a shattered hip; and Allyson has severe head trauma.

Both girls are rushed to the hospital, while Trygve and Page arrive before the surgeries. Page is unable to reach Brad until after the surgery has begun, and Brad is outraged that she did not consult him beforehand. She informs him that Allyson would have died at six'o'clock if the surgery had not been performed. One hour later, Brad arrives at the hospital and leaves for their house without Page. Later, Page confronts him as to why he is home early from his "trip" and he confesses that he has been cheating on her. Soon afterwards Brad disappears several times. Eventually Page's mother, Maribelle, and sister Alexis arrive in San Francisco and laze about the house while Allison remains in the hospital.

One night after dinner, Page rages at her mother, demanding why she pretends that she did not know that her father molested her and her sister when they were children. Soon she forces Brad to move out and sends her mother and sister back to New York. By then she and Trygve had confessed their feelings toward each other. For four months, Allyson remains in a coma and Andrew, who has attempted to run away, is taken to see his sister. Soon Trygve and his children Nick, Bjorn and Chloe go to a lake for the weekend, and Allyson awakens from her coma. When Page goes to join them at the lake, she confesses to Trygve that she is pregnant with his child, and they begin to plan their wedding.

== Reception ==
The novel received mixed reviews. Publishers Weekly called the ending "predictable, but pleasant."
