= Betty Eadie =

American author (born 1942)

Betty (Jean) Eadie (born 1942) is an American author of several books on near-death experiences (NDEs). Her best-known book is Embraced by the Light, (1992) describing her NDE. It was followed by The Awakening Heart (1996). The Ripple Effect (1999) and Embraced by the Light: Prayers and Devotions for Daily Living (2001) were both published independently.

== Early life and career ==
Eadie was born in Valentine, Nebraska to "a full-blooded Sioux Indian" mother and Scotch-Irish father, and was primarily raised on the Rosebud Indian Reservation in South Dakota. When she was four years old, Eadie's parents separated and she was placed in St. Francis Indian School, an American Indian boarding school, along with six of her siblings. While in high school, she dropped out to care for a younger sister. She later studied to receive her diploma while on bed rest during her final pregnancy, and eventually pursued a college degree. She spent time variously in churches affiliated with Catholicism, Methodism, and for a time in The Church of Jesus Christ of Latter-day Saints in Seattle, though in numerous public talks she subsequently declared herself non-denominational.

After her NDE, Betty began volunteering her time at a cancer research center comforting dying patients and their families. She then studied hypnotherapy, graduating at the top of her class, and later opened her own clinic. After Embraced by the Light was published, Eadie gave up her hypnotherapy practice and began traveling extensively throughout the United States, Canada, Great Britain and Ireland, speaking on death and the afterlife. Eadie continues to collect and evaluate near-death accounts, as well as giving speeches and lectures.

== NDE account ==
In her NDE account, Eadie reports many phenomena similar to other NDE accounts, such as going through a dark tunnel, seeing a bright light and experiencing a life review, as well as other features unique to her story. In 1973, at age 31, Eadie was recovering from a surgical operation. Eadie reported that she first felt herself fading to lifelessness, then felt a surge of energy followed by a "pop" and feeling of release, a sense of freedom and movement unhindered by inertia or gravity. She was met by three angelic beings who spoke with her about her prior existence and hitherto suppressed memories in order to participate in earthly experience. She traveled to terrestrial locations such as her home merely by thinking about them, returned to her hospital, and then passed on through a dark tunnel-like medium in which she reported sensing other beings in a transitory preparatory stage.

Exiting the tunnel, Eadie approached an intense white light and met in heaven the embrace of Jesus Christ. During this encounter, she reported a strong sense of love and a high-speed transfer of answers to her many questions. Possessing a corporeal identity of an ethereal kind, she visited numerous places, persons, and phenomena such as natural settings and gardens beyond the character of the conventionally material, and was taken on a tour of sorts of learning experiences that she said felt equivalent to weeks or months.

In addition to discussing traditional Christian subjects such as prayer, creation, and the Garden of Eden, Eadie reported visiting a library of the mind. Here it became possible to know anything or anyone in history or the present, in minute and unambiguous detail, as well as being able to observe individuals on Earth and being taken to distant reaches and civilizations of the universe.

Warned initially upon arrival that she had died prematurely, Eadie was at last told she must return in order to fulfill the personal mission allocated her. Its specific character, like numerous other details, were removed from her memory, in order, she said she was told, to prevent difficulties in her fulfilling it. Upon protesting, she was made to understand the reason behind the necessity for her return and reluctantly agreed to do so. She exacted a promise that she would not be made to stay on Earth longer than necessary. She reported her return to material corporeality as extremely heavy-feeling and unpleasant, initially intermittent in phases, and accompanied not long after by a demonic visitation that was cut short by an angelic reappearance.

Eadie's doctor reportedly verified her clinical death on a return visit to the hospital, attributing it to a hemorrhage during a nurses' shift change, and took great interest in her recollections. Independent verification of the length of her death was not possible, but she speculated it could have lasted up to four hours based on her memory of certain details preceding and following it.

== After ==
Subsequent to her experience, she spoke of it very little and suffered a long-term depression. This, she attributed to the anticlimactic nature of returning to corporeality after experiencing the heaven of afterlife. She slowly became involved in near-death groups and studies and gave talks, subsequently going on to write her account in book form, which met with runaway success.

While her account incorporated elements of traditional Christianity, it also met with a certain degree of resistance as well. This was largely, in part, to its teaching (as she reported she was given it) that some denominations might approximate truth better than others. She explains, however, that different teachings were more appropriate for certain individuals at their given stage of spiritual development, and therefore judgment should not be passed on them for where they were. Unlike many fundamentalist Christians, and despite her own strict Catholic upbringing, and a temporary conversion to the restored Gospel of Jesus Christ through The Church Of Jesus Christ Of Latter Day Saints, after her near-death experience, Eadie refers to God as "he" instead of "He" and insists that all religions are necessary for each person. She claims that each religion is necessary for each person, because of their different levels of spiritual enlightenment. This is contrary to the views, shared by many Christian denominations worldwide, that Christianity is the one true, valid religion. Many of her statements also are ambiguous or conflict with the mainstream doctrine of the Trinity, and her website disavows the traditional condemnation of homosexuality.

In addition, unlike some other Near-Death Experiencers, Eadie claims that reincarnation, as it is typically thought of, does not truly exist. Eadie claims she was told that only a few return to this earth more than once, that some are sent back as teachers to help others. She taught similar withholding of censure on individuals for things like atheism and homosexuality and rejected a common traditional image of hell as an eternity of suffering, suggesting that her life review experience, in which she was made to live and feel the full positive and negative consequences of her cumulative actions in intense detail, including their effects on all around her, were a more than adequate equivalent and probably what the term truly signified.

She also stressed that her key lesson was that life's purpose was to learn love and to grow through the exercise of free will, including making mistakes. Other teachings she recounted being given included the idea that there were few if any true accidents and that human lives and paths were chosen, agreed to, and prepared for in advance, with memory of such details suppressed and veiled. Suicide, she said she was told, was wrong because it deprived people of opportunities to learn and grow, and that there was always hope in life.

== Sequels ==
The Awakening Heart is Eadie's second book and also became a NYT Bestseller in which she describes her challenges and experience that followed her NDE up through the time that Embraced By The Light was published, as well as giving additional details about her NDE that were not included in her first book. The Ripple Effect pursued these further, incorporating discussion of the numerous letters she began to receive in response from readers, as well as discussing other NDE contacts she later developed. Eadie formed her own Publishing house, Onjinjinkta Publishing, through which she published her third book and her fourth book, Embraced By The Light Prayers and Devotions for Daily Living, as well as various works from other authors.

Because of their appeal to the innate human desire for an understanding of afterlife, her works led to a strong reader response which she initially attempted to answer in detail but became forced to limit. To meet some of this demand, she developed a website for general information and inspirational materials, as well as distribution of her books and related materials.

During a 2004 interview on Coast to Coast AM radio with George Noory, she said she was disappointed, following her first book's publication, that she was not permitted to return to the Celestial realm. While she could not presently know the full scope of her earthly purpose, she understood a film based on Embraced would also follow.

== Personal life ==
Her husband, Joe, worked in aerospace computing and died in 2011. Together they had eight children.

== See also ==
- Raymond Moody
- NDE studies
