= Strawbs discography =

- Studio albums: 26
- Live albums: 11
- Compilation albums: 10
- Singles: 34
- Video albums: 7

This is a discography of the band Strawbs.

== Albums ==
=== Studio albums ===
Year	Album details	Peak chart position							Notes
Year	Album details	UK	US	AUS	NOR	NL	SWE	CAN	Notes
1969	Strawbs	—	—	—	—	—	—	—	
1970	Dragonfly	—	—	—	—	—	—	—	
1971	From the Witchwood	39	—	—	—	—	—	—	
1972	Grave New World	11	191	49	—	—	—	—	
1973	Bursting at the Seams	2	121	—	—	—	—	65	
1973	All Our Own Work	—	—	—	—	—	—	—	as "Sandy Denny and the Strawbs", recorded in Denmark, 1967
1974	Hero and Heroine	35	94	—	20	—	—	70	
1975	Ghosts	—	47	—	—	—	—	12	
1975	Nomadness	—	147	—	—	—	—	—	
1976	Deep Cuts	—	144	—	—	—	—	63	
1977	Burning for You	—	175	—	—	—	—	—	
1978	Deadlines	—	—	—	—	—	—	—	
1987	Don't Say Goodbye	—	—	—	—	—	—	—	
1991	Ringing Down the Years	—	—	—	—	—	—	—	
1995	Heartbreak Hill	—	—	—	—	—	—	—	Recorded in 1978
2001	Baroque & Roll	—	—	—	—	—	—	—	Acoustic Strawbs
2001	Strawberry Sampler Number 1	—	—	—	—	—	—	—	Released privately in 1969
2003	Blue Angel	—	—	—	—	—	—	—	Includes re-recorded songs from Two Weeks Last Summer and Bursting at the Seams
2004	Déjà Fou	—	—	—	—	—	—	—	
2008	The Broken Hearted Bride	—	—	—	—	—	—	—	
2009	Dancing to the Devil's Beat	—	—	—	—	—	—	—	
2011	Hero & Heroine in Ascencia	—	—	—	—	—	—	—	
2014	Prognostic	—	—	—	—	—	—	—	
2017	The Ferryman's Curse	—	—	—	—	—	—	—	
2021	Settlement	—	—	—	—	—	—	—	
2023	The Magic of it All	—	—	—	—	—	—	—	

=== Live albums ===
Year	Album details	Peak chart position						Notes
Year	Album details	UK	US	CH	NOR	NL	SWE	Notes
1970	Just a Collection of Antiques and Curios	27	—	—	—	—	—	
1993	Greatest Hits Live	—	—	—	—	—	—	Recorded 1990 for a Central TV "Bedrock" show
1995	Strawbs in Concert	—	—	—	—	—	—	Tracks from the BBC "In Concert" shows from 1973 and 1974
1999	Concert Classics	—	—	—	—	—	—	BBC "Sight and Sound" performance from 1977
2000	The Complete Strawbs	—	—	—	—	—	—	30th anniversary concert at Chiswick House
2005	Full Bloom	—	—	—	—	—	—	Acoustic Strawbs
2005	Live at Nearfest	—	—	—	—	—	—	
2005	Painted Sky	—	—	—	—	—	—	Acoustic Strawbs
2006	Recollection	—	—	—	—	—	—	
2007	Strawbs NY '75	—	—	—	—	—	—	
2008	Lay Down with the Strawbs	—	—	—	—	—	—	Double CD recorded at Robin 2, Bilston 5 March 2006

=== Compilation albums ===
Year	Album details	Peak chart position						Notes
Year	Album details	UK	US	CH	NOR	NL	SWE	Notes
1974	Strawbs by Choice	—	—	—	—	—	—	
1974	Early Strawbs	—	—	—	—	—	—	Canadian-only compilation of Strawbs and Dragonfly
1977	Classic Strawbs	—	—	—	—	—	—	Canadian-only compilation of every A&M LP except Strawbs
1978	The Best of Strawbs	—	—	—	—	—	—	
1990	Preserves Uncanned	—	—	—	—	—	—	1960s high-quality demo recordings
1991	Sandy Denny and the Strawbs	—	—	—	—	—	—	a partial repackaging of All Our Own Work
1992	A Choice Selection of Strawbs	—	—	—	—	—	—	
1997	Halcyon Days	—	—	—	—	—	—	
2002	The Collection	—	—	—	—	—	—	
2002	Tears and Pavan	—	—	—	—	—	—	
2003	20th Century Masters: The Millennium Collection: The Best of Strawbs	—	—	—	—	—	—	
2006	A Taste of Strawbs	—	—	—	—	—	—	A box-set of 4 CD's featuring recordings from 1967 to 2006
2011	Acoustic Gold	—	—	—	—	—	—	A collection of released and unreleased acoustic material

== Singles ==
Year	Title	Peak chart position				Album	Notes
Year	Title	UK Singles Chart	CAN	NL	SWE	Album	Notes
1968	"Oh, How She Changed"	—	—	—	—	Strawbs	
1968	"The Man Who Called Himself Jesus"	—	—	—	—	Strawbs	
1970	"Forever"	—	—	—	—	Non-album single	
1970	"Where Is This Dream of Your Youth"	—	—	—	—	Strawbs	Released in Germany and the Netherlands only
1971	"Witchwood"	—	—	—	—	From the Witchwood	Withdrawn due to poor quality of pressing
1971	"Benedictus"	—	—	—	—	Grave New World	
1972	"Keep the Devil Outside"	—	—	—	—	Non-album single	Japan only
1972	"New World"	—	—	—	—	Grave New World	Japan only
1972	"Here It Comes"	—	—	—	—	Non-album single	
1972	"Lay Down"	12	—	—	—	Bursting at the Seams	
1973	"Part of the Union"	2	48	20	—	Bursting at the Seams	
1973	"Shine on Silver Sun"	34	—	—	—	Hero and Heroine	
1974	"Hero and Heroine"	—	—	—	—	Hero and Heroine	
1974	"Hold on to Me (The Winter Long)"	—	—	—	—	Hero and Heroine	
1974	"Round and Round"	—	—	—	—	Hero and Heroine	USA and Italy only
1974	"Grace Darling"	—	—	—	—	Ghosts	
1974	"Angel Wine"	—	—	—	—	Ghosts	Japan only
1975	"Lemon Pie"	—	—	—	—	Ghosts	
1975	"Little Sleepy"	—	—	—	—	Nomadness	USA and Portugal only
1976	"I Only Want My Love to Grow in You"	55 (Note: Chart position is from the official UK "Breakers List".)	—	—	—	Deep Cuts	
1976	"So Close and Yet So Far Away"	—	—	—	—	Deep Cuts	USA only
1976	"Charmer"	—	—	—	—	Deep Cuts	
1977	"Back in the Old Routine"	—	—	—	—	Burning for You	
1977	"Keep on Trying"	—	—	—	—	Burning for You	
1977	"Heartbreaker"	—	—	—	—	Burning for You	Not released in the UK
1977	"Part of the Union"	—	—	—	—	Bursting at the Seams	Reissue of 1973 single
1978	"Joey and Me"	—	—	—	—	Deadlines	
1978	"New Beginnings"	—	—	—	—	Deadlines	
1978	"I Don't Want to Talk About It"	—	—	—	—	Deadlines	
1979	"The King"	—	—	—	—	Non-album single	
1987	"That's When the Crying Starts"	—	—	—	—	Don't Say Goodbye	Canada only
1987	"Let It Rain"	—	—	—	—	Don't Say Goodbye	Canada only
1991	"Might as Well Be on Mars"	—	—	—	—	Ringing Down the Years	Canada only (#2 CanCon)
2002	"Alice's Song"	—	—	—	—	Baroque and Roll	

== Video albums ==
Year	Title
1992	Greatest Hits Live
2001	The Strawbs — Classic Rock Legends
2002	The Complete Strawbs — Live at Chiswick House
2003	Strawbs Live in Tokyo '75/Grave New World — The Video
2004	Acoustic Strawbs Live at Hugh's Room, Toronto
2008	Strawbs — Lay Down with the Strawbs
2009	Acoustic Strawbs Live at Hampton Court Palace
