= The Best of Strawbs =

Compilation album by Strawbs
- Released: 1978
- Recorded: 1971–1975
- Genre: Folk rock; progressive folk; progressive rock
- Label: A&M Records

Strawbs chronology
| Deadlines (1978) | The Best of Strawbs (1978) | Don't Say Goodbye (1987) |

The Best of Strawbs is a compilation album of songs by Strawbs, with one track from the Dave Cousins solo album Two Weeks Last Summer.

== Track listing ==
=== Side one ===
1. "Hero and Heroine" (Dave Cousins)
2. "Tears and Pavan"
  "Tears" (Cousins)
  "Pavan" (Richard Hudson, John Ford, Cousins)
3. "A Glimpse of Heaven" (Cousins)
4. "Round and Round" (Cousins)
5. "New World" (Cousins)

=== Side two ===
1. "Benedictus" (Cousins)
2. "Shine on Silver Sun" (Cousins)
3. "To Be Free" (Cousins)
4. "Where Do You Go (When You Need a Hole to Crawl In)" (Cousins)
5. "Autumn"
  "Heroine's Theme" (John Hawken)
  "Deep Summer's Sleep" (Cousins)
  "The Winter Long" (Cousins)

=== Side three ===
1. "Don't Try to Change Me" (Dave Lambert)
2. "Little Sleepy" (Lambert)
3. "Part of the Union" (Hudson, Ford)
4. "Song of a Sad Little Girl" (Cousins)
5. "Down by the Sea" (Cousins)

=== Side four ===
1. "Lay Down" (Cousins)
2. "Heavy Disguise" (Ford)
3. "Lemon Pie" (Cousins)
4. "Blue Angel" (Cousins)
  "Divided"
  "Half Worlds Apart"
  "At Rest"

== Personnel ==
- Dave Cousins – lead vocals, guitar, dulcimer
- Tony Hooper - backing vocals, guitar
- Dave Lambert – lead vocals, backing vocals, guitar
- John Ford – lead vocals, backing vocals, bass guitar, acoustic guitar
- Chas Cronk – backing vocals, bass guitar
- Blue Weaver – keyboards
- John Hawken – keyboards
- Richard Hudson - backing vocals, drums, percussion
- Rod Coombes – drums
- Jon Hiseman – drums

== Guest musician ==
- Roger Glover – bass guitar

== Recording history ==
| Region | Date | Label | Format | Catalog | Comment |
|---|---|---|---|---|---|
| United Kingdom | 1978 | A&M | stereo 2LP | AMLM 66005 | |
| United States | 1978 | A&M | stereo 2LP | SP 6005 | |
| Canada | 1978 | A&M | stereo 2LP | SP 96005 | |
