= Live at Nearfest =

Live at NEARFest

Live album by Strawbs
- Released: August 2005
- Recorded: June 2004
- Genre: Progressive rock
- Label: Witchwood
- Producer: Steve Crimmel

Strawbs chronology
Full Bloom (2005)	Live at NEARFest (2005)	Painted Sky (2005)

Professional ratings
Review scores
Source	Rating
Allmusic	3/5 stars

Live at NEARFest is a live album by Strawbs. It was recorded at NEARFest in Bethlehem, Pennsylvania on July 11, 2004 and featured the line-up which played together on the albums Hero and Heroine (1974), Ghosts (1975), and Déjà Fou (2004).

== Track listing ==
1. "Out in the Cold" (Dave Cousins) – 3:13
2. "Round and Round" (Cousins) – 5:31
3. "Lay Down" (Cousins) – 4:19
4. "Burning for Me" (Cousins, John Mealing) – 5:55
5. "New World" (Cousins) – 3:54
6. "Autumn" – 10:11
  "Heroine's Theme" (John Hawken)
  "Deep Summer Sleep" (Cousins)
  "The Winter Long" (Cousins)
7. "Remembering/You and I (When We Were Very Young)" (Hawking, Cousins) – 5:37
8. "Heartbreaker" (Dave Lambert) – 4:40
9. "This Barren Land" (Cousins) – 4:43
10. "The River" (Cousins) – 3:02
11. "Down by the Sea" (Cousins) – 8:37
12. "Hero and Heroine" (Cousins) – 3:33
13. "Round and Round" (reprise) (Cousins) – 3:34
14. "Here Today, Gone Tomorrow" (Cousins) – 5:05

== Personnel ==
- Dave Cousins – lead vocals, backing vocals, acoustic guitar, electric guitar, banjo, dulcimer
- Dave Lambert – lead vocals, backing vocals, electric guitar, acoustic guitar
- Chas Cronk – bass guitar, bass pedals, 12-string guitar, backing vocals
- John Hawken – keyboards
- Rod Coombes – drums, percussion

== Recording ==
Recorded live at the NEARFest festival, Bethlehem, Pennsylvania.

- Steve Crimmel – producer, engineer

== Release history ==
Region	Date	Label	Format	Catalog
Worldwide	August 2005	Witchwood	CD	WMCD2026
