= Painted Sky =

Live album by Acoustic Strawbs
- Released: 27 December 2005
- Recorded: 2004 and 2005
- Genre: Folk rock
- Producer: Steve Crimmel

Acoustic Strawbs chronology
| Live at Nearfest (2005) | Painted Sky (2005) | Recollection (2006) |

Professional ratings
Review scores
| Source | Rating |
|---|---|
| AllMusic | 3.5/5 stars |

Painted Sky is a live album by Acoustic Strawbs, released on 27 December 2005.

== Track listing ==
1. "Oh How She Changed" (Dave Cousins, Tony Hooper)
2. "Autumn"
  "Heroine's Theme" (John Hawken)
  "Deep Summer Sleep" (Cousins)
  "The Winter Long" (Cousins)
3. "Cold Steel" (Dave Lambert)
4. "New World" (Cousins)
5. "The Antique Suite" (Cousins)
  "The Reaper"
  "We Must Cross the River"
  "Antiques and Curios"
  "Hey It's Been a Long Time"
6. "Hard Hard Winter" (Cousins, Robert Kirby)
7. "Midnight Sun" (Chas Cronk, Cousins)
8. "Grace Darling" (Cousins)
9. "If" (Cousins)
10. "Hero and Heroine" (Cousins)

== Personnel ==
- Dave Cousins – lead vocals, backing vocals, acoustic guitar, dulcimer, banjo
- Dave Lambert – lead vocals, backing vocals, acoustic guitar
- Chas Cronk – acoustic bass guitar, acoustic guitar, bass pedals, vocals

== Recording ==
Recorded live at Painted Sky Studios, Cambria, California.

- Steve Crimmel – producer, engineer

== Release history ==
| Region | Date | Label | Format | Catalog |
|---|---|---|---|---|
| Worldwide | 2005 | | CD | |
