= Lay Down with the Strawbs =

Live album by Strawbs
- Released: July 2008
- Recorded: March 5, 2006
- Genre: Progressive rock

Strawbs chronology
A Taste of Strawbs (2006)	Lay Down with the Strawbs (2008)	The Broken Hearted Bride (2008)

Lay Down with the Strawbs is a live album by English band Strawbs. It was recorded at Robin 2 in Bilston on March 5, 2006 and features the "Hero and Heroine line-up" of the band with a guest appearance of former member John Ford.

== Track listing ==
=== Disc one ===
1. "Lay Down" (Dave Cousins)
2. "I Only Want My Love to Grow in You" (Cousins, Chas Cronk)
3. "Shine on Silver Sun" (Cousins)
4. "Ghosts" (Cousins)
5. "Remembering/And You and I (When We Were Very Young)" (John Hawken/Cousins)
6. "Cold Steel" (Dave Lambert)
7. "Impressions of Southall from the Train/The Life Auction" (Cousins)
8. "Out in the Cold/Round and Round" (Cousins)
9. "Just Love" (Lambert)

=== Disc two ===
1. "Autumn" (Cousins)
2. "Raq's Aswad Drum Solo" (Rod Coombes)
3. "Hero and Heroine" (Cousins)
4. "Round and Round (reprise)" (Cousins)
5. "Part of the Union" (Richard Hudson, John Ford)
6. "The Man Who Called Himself Jesus" (Cousins)
7. "Tears and Pavane" (Cousins, Hudson, Ford)
8. "Kissed by the Sun"
9. "Heavy Disguise" (Ford)

== Personnel ==
Strawbs

- Dave Cousins – lead vocals, backing vocals, guitar, banjo
- Dave Lambert – lead vocals, backing vocals, guitar
- Chas Cronk – backing vocals, bass guitar
- John Hawken – keyboards
- Rod Coombes – drums

Additional personnel

- John Ford – lead vocals, backing vocals, guitar

== Release history ==
Region	Date	Label	Format	Catalog
United Kingdom	July 2008		CD	
