= Full Bloom (Acoustic Strawbs album) =

Jon Connolly presents Full Bloom

Live album by Acoustic Strawbs
- Released: 2005
- Recorded: 2004
- Genre: Folk rock
- Label: Natural Sound
- Producer: Jon Connolly

Acoustic Strawbs chronology
Déjà Fou (2004)	Jon Connolly presents Full Bloom (2005)	Live at Nearfest (2005)

Full Bloom is a live album by Acoustic Strawbs.

== Track listing ==
1. "Autumn"
  "Heroine's Theme" (John Hawken)
  "Deep Summer Sleep" (Dave Cousins)
  "The Winter Long" (Cousins)
2. "Shine on Silver Sun" (Cousins)
3. "Ghosts" (Cousins)
  "Sweet Dreams"
  "Night Light"
  "Guardian Angel"
  "Night Light"
4. "The Flower and the Young Man" (Cousins)
5. "Remembering" (Hawken)
6. "You and I (When We Were Young)" (Cousins)
7. "The Winter and the Summer" (Dave Lambert)
8. "Tears and Pavan" (Cousins, Richard Hudson, John Ford)
9. "Out in the Cold" (Cousins)
10. "Round and Round" (Cousins)
11. "Alice's Song" (Cathryn Craig, Brian Willoughby)
12. "Hero and Heroine" (Cousins)
13. "A Glimpse of Heaven" (Cousins)
14. "The River" (Cousins)
15. "Down by the Sea" (Cousins)

== Personnel ==
- Dave Cousins – lead vocals, backing vocals, acoustic guitar, mandolin, banjo
- Dave Lambert – lead vocals, backing vocals, acoustic guitar
- Brian Willoughby – acoustic guitar
- Jon Connolly - producer and director

== Recording ==
Recorded live by Jon Connolly at Natural Sound, Kitchener, Ontario, Canada

== Release history ==
Region	Date	Label	Format	Catalog
Worldwide	2004	Jon Connolly productions	CD	
Worldwide	2005	Natural Sound	CD with slightly different track listing	
