= The Complete Strawbs =

Live album by Strawbs
- Released: 2000
- Recorded: 1998
- Genre: Progressive rock
- Label: Witchwood

Strawbs chronology
Concert Classics (1999)	The Complete Strawbs (2000)	Baroque & Roll (2001)

The Complete Strawbs is a live album by English band Strawbs. It was recorded in 1998, at their 30th anniversary concert at Chiswick House. The concert was also filmed and later was released on DVD. More than four different incarnations of the band performed. Wherever possible, the tracks were performed by the original musicians, although there were exceptions. Keyboard players John Hawken, Andy Richards and Rick Wakeman were unable to attend, but Wakeman's son Adam deputised for them. Original bass player Ron Chesterman and one-time drummer Tony Fernandez were present at the concert but did not perform.

== Track listing ==
All tracks written by Dave Cousins except where stated

=== CD ===
1. "Further Down the Road"
2. "Grace Darling"
3. "Ringing Down the Years"
4. "Beside the Rio Grande"
5. "Out in the Cold"
6. "Round and Round"
7. "Hero and Heroine"
8. "Witchwood"
9. "A Glimpse of Heaven"
10. "Josephine for Better or for Worse"
11. "Oh How She Changed" (Cousins, Tony Hooper)
12. "New World"
13. "The River"
14. "Down by the Sea"
15. "Part of the Union" (Richard Hudson, John Ford)

=== DVD ===
The DVD listing is the same as the CD listing up to and including track 11. Thereafter the following tracks appear: -

12. "New World"
13. "Stormy Down"
14. "Part of the Union" (Hudson, Ford)
15. "The River"
16. "Down by the Sea"

The DVD contains the following bonus features:

- Blue Angel – the 1990s band
- Dave Cousins Remembers – Dave Cousins' recollections of the day
- Strawbs in Tokyo '75 – a preview

== Personnel ==
Track numbers refer to the CD listing

- Dave Cousins – vocals, acoustic guitar, dulcimer (all tracks)
- Tony Hooper – vocals, acoustic guitar (tracks 8–11)
- Dave Lambert – vocals, electric guitar (tracks 4–7, 12–15)
- Brian Willoughby – guitar (tracks 1–3, 7–11, 14)
- John Ford – bass guitar, vocals (tracks 8–15)
- Chas Cronk – bass guitar, vocals (tracks 4–7)
- Rod Demick – bass guitar, vocals (tracks 1–3)
- Blue Weaver – keyboards (tracks 1–3, 8–15)
- Richard Hudson – drums, vocals (tracks 1–3, 8–15)
- Rod Coombes – drums, vocals (tracks 4–7)

Additional personnel

- Cathryn Craig – vocals (track 1)
- Ric Sanders – violin (tracks 3, 7)
- Adam Wakeman – keyboards (tracks 2 – 7, 14)

== Release history ==
Region	Date	Label	Format	Catalog
United Kingdom	1999	Witchwood	CD	WCCD2001
United Kingdom	2002	Witchwood Media	DVD	WCDVD2006
