= Charmer (Strawbs song) =

Single by Strawbs

from the album Deep Cuts
- A-side: "Charmer"
- B-side: Beside the Rio Grande
- Released: 1976
- Genre: Progressive rock
- Label: Oyster
- Songwriters: Dave Cousins, Chas Cronk

Strawbs singles chronology
"I Only Want My Love to Grow in You" (1975)	"Charmer" (1976)	"Back in the Old Routine" (1977)

"Charmer" is a song by English band Strawbs featured on their 1976 album Deep Cuts.

The song was written by Dave Cousins and Chas Cronk. The single version has some additional overdubs compared to the version on the album.

== Release history ==
Region	Date	Label	Format	Catalogue	Notes
United Kingdom	1976	Oyster	7" single	2066 744	

== B-Side of the single ==
The B-side track "Beside the Rio Grande" is a Dave Cousins composition also appearing on the album. The lyrics recount a story of the unjust lynching of a preacher, in the American Wild West.

== Personnel ==
The personnel for this song include:

- Dave Cousins – lead vocals, acoustic guitar
- Dave Lambert – electric guitar, backing vocals
- Chas Cronk – bass guitar, backing vocals
- Rod Coombes – drums

with (Note: Mellotron can clearly be heard on this track, therefore according to the album credits Robert Kirby is playing on this track. Both the other keyboard players are credited on the album but it is unsure which of them played on this particular track. A synthesizer can be heard in the instrumentation but both Mealing and Holmes are credited with this instrument in the album credits.)

- Robert Kirby – mellotron
- John Mealing / Rupert Holmes – keyboards / synthesizer
