= Baroque & Roll =

Baroque and Roll

Studio album by Acoustic Strawbs
- Released: 2001
- Recorded: July 2001
- Genre: Folk rock
- Label: Witchwood Records

Acoustic Strawbs chronology
The Complete Strawbs (2000)	Baroque and Roll (2001)	Strawberry Sampler Number 1 (2001)

Singles from Baroque and Roll
- 1. "Alice's Song"

Baroque and Roll is the sixteenth studio album by Acoustic Strawbs. Acoustic Strawbs were formed by accident after Dave Cousins and Brian Willoughby were booked to perform as a duo in Twickenham in 2000. Cousins damaged his wrist and Dave Lambert stepped in to cover while Cousins sang. The format was successful and tours were arranged. Brian Willoughby stepped down in 2004 to concentrate on his work with Cathryn Craig and he was replaced by Chas Cronk who added bass pedals and acoustic bass guitar as well as extra vocals and guitar.

== Track listing ==
1. "Tears and Pavan"
  "Tears" (Dave Cousins)
  "Pavan" (Cousins, Richard Hudson, John Ford)
2. "Remembering" (John Hawken)
3. "You and I (When We Were Young)" (Cousins)
4. "Evergreen" (Cousins)
5. "Ghosts" (Cousins)
  "Sweet Dreams"
  "Night Light"
  "Guardian Angel"
  "Night Light"
6. "There Will Come the Day" (Cousins, Don Airey)
7. "Not All the Flowers Grow" (Cousins)
8. "Inside Your Hell Tonight" (Dave Lambert)
9. "The Golden Salamander" (Cousins)
10. "The River" (Cousins)
11. "Down by the Sea" (Cousins)
12. "The Flower and the Young Man" (Cousins)
13. "Benedictus" (Cousins)
14. "Alice's Song" (Cathryn Craig, Brian Willoughby)

== Personnel ==
- Dave Cousins – lead vocals, backing vocals, acoustic guitar, dulcimer, banjo
- Dave Lambert – lead vocals, backing vocals, acoustic guitar
- Brian Willoughby – acoustic guitar

Additional personnel

- Robert Kirby – string arrangements on tracks 4, 8 and 14
- Howard Gott – violin
- Ruth Gottlieb – violin
- Sophi Sirotia – viola
- Sarah Willson – cello
- Andy Waterworth – double bass

== Recording ==
Recorded at KD's Studio, Chiswick, London in July 2001

- Kenny Denton – engineer

== Release history ==
Region	Date	Label	Format	Catalog
United Kingdom	2001	Witchwood	CD	WC CD2004
