= Burn for You =

Burn for You may refer to:

- "Burn for You" (INXS song), 1984
- "Burn for You" (John Farnham song), 1990
- "Burn for You" (TobyMac song), 2004

== See also ==
- Burning for You, a 1977 album by Strawbs
- "Burnin' for You", a 1981 song by Blue Öyster Cult
