= Grace Darling (song) =

Single by Strawbs

from the album Ghosts
- B-side: "Changes Arrange Us"
- Released: November 1, 1974
- Genre: Progressive rock
- Length: 3:55
- Label: A&M
- Songwriter: Dave Cousins

Strawbs singles chronology
"Hold on to Me (The Winter Long)" (1974)	"Grace Darling" (1974)	"Lemon Pie" (1975)

Official Audio
- "Grace Darling" on YouTube

"Grace Darling" is a song by English band Strawbs, featured on their 1975 album Ghosts.

== Recording ==
The track was recorded in the chapel of the Charterhouse School, which the members of the band Genesis had attended in the 1960s, and which Strawbs' producer at the time, Tom Allom, had also attended.

According to Dave Cousins, the chapel's pipe organ was used, played by Alastair Ross, choirmaster and organist of St Lawrence's Church, West Wycombe; the band's keyboardist, John Hawken, chose not play on the recording, as he was not used to the very noticeable delay that falls between the pressing of a key on a pipe organ and the sounding of the corresponding note.

During recording, Cousins became ill and, after hospitalisation for a lumbar puncture, was obliged to record while lying down on the floor of the studio.

== Lyrical and musical content ==
The title derives from the refrain "You are my saving grace/Darling, I love you," which references the Victorian heroine Grace Darling. The lyrics contain references to storms, lifeboats and other nautical-related items. The song compares the singer's paramour to the famous lighthouse keeper's daughter, expressing gratitude that she is steadfast and has helped him through dark times with her constant love.

The song has a three-verse structure with a middle section between verses two and three. An instrumental section is heard at the beginning and end and also preceding the middle section. The predominant instruments are the pipe organ and the choir, giving the song a classical or hymnal feel.

The song was re-recorded in 1975 with a set of French lyrics and entitled "Chérie, Je T'aime" for release in Canada, to appeal to Strawbs' French Canadian audience.

The sleeve notes to the 1998 CD re-issue of Ghosts report that a promotional video was recorded for the single featuring an interview with Cousins on a lifeboat. Originally thought to have been lost, the film reappeared on the 2003 Strawbs Live In Tokyo/Grave New World DVD.

== B-side ==
The B-side track "Changes Arrange Us" is a Rod Coombes composition, which does not feature on the album. The record label shows the title incorrectly as "Changes Arranges"

The B-side of the 1975 French Canadian release is "Heroine's Theme", the first part of the song "Autumn" from the album Hero and Heroine, composed by keyboard player John Hawken.

== Release history ==
Region	Date	Label	Format	Catalogue
United Kingdom	November 1, 1974	A&M Records	7" single	AMS7139
Canada	1975	A&M Records	7" single	AM 390-S

== Other recordings ==
The track was rearranged and recorded by a different line-up of the band for the album Ringing Down the Years. Dave Cousins and Brian Willoughby also recorded it for their album Old School Songs.

== Personnel ==
- Dave Cousins – lead vocals, acoustic guitar
- Dave Lambert – electric guitar
- Chas Cronk – bass guitar
- Rod Coombes – drums

with

- Alastair Ross – pipe organ
- Charterhouse School, Godalming, Surrey – choir
