= Lemon Pie =

Single by Strawbs

from the album Ghosts
- B-side: "Don't Try to Change Me"
- Released: 4 April 1975
- Genre: Progressive rock
- Length: 4:03
- Label: A&M
- Songwriter: Dave Cousins

Strawbs singles chronology
"Grace Darling" (1974)	"Lemon Pie" (1975)	"I Only Want My Love to Grow in You" (1976)

Official Audio
- "Lemon Pie" on YouTube

"Lemon Pie" is a song by English band Strawbs. featured on their 1974 album Ghosts.

== Lyrical and musical content ==
The song was written by Dave Cousins and was the second single to be released from the album. It was written about and for Cousins's girlfriend at the time, who later became his wife.

== Release history ==
Region	Date	Label	Format	Catalogue	Notes
United Kingdom	4 April 1975	A&M	7" single	AMS7161	
United States, Canada	1975	A&M	7" single	1687-S	B-side "Where Do You Go (When You Need a Hole to Crawl In)"
New Zealand, Australia	1975	A&M	7" single	K-5924	

== B-Side of the single ==
The B-side track "Don't Try to Change Me" is a Dave Lambert composition, also appearing on the album.

The B-side of the 1975 United States release is "Where Do You Go (When You Need a Hole to Crawl In)", another Dave Cousins composition.

== Personnel ==
- Dave Cousins – lead vocals, acoustic guitar
- Dave Lambert – electric guitar, backing vocals
- Chas Cronk – bass guitar, backing vocals
- John Hawken – harpsichord, synthesizer, piano
- Rod Coombes – drums
