= I Only Want My Love to Grow in You =

Single by Strawbs

from the album Deep Cuts
- A-side: "I Only Want My Love to Grow in You"
- B-side: "(Wasting My Time) Thinking of You"
- Released: 1976
- Genre: Progressive rock
- Length: 3:00
- Label: Oyster
- Songwriter(s): Dave Cousins, Chas Cronk

Strawbs singles chronology
"Lemon Pie" (1975)	"I Only Want My Love to Grow in You" (1976)	"Charmer" (1976)

"I Only Want My Love to Grow in You" is a song by English band Strawbs featured on their 1976 album Deep Cuts.

The song was written by Dave Cousins and Chas Cronk and was the first single to be released under their new deal with Oyster Records. This was the first single to be written by the Cousins/Cronk partnership and was chosen for its radio friendliness. Indeed it was BBC Radio 1's record of the week when released and got plenty of airplay. However, this did not translate into record sales

== Release history ==
Region	Date	Label	Format	Catalogue	Notes
United Kingdom	1976	Oyster	7" single	2066 705	
United States	1976	Oyster	7" single	OY-705	B-side "I Only Want My Love to Grow in You" (Mono version)
Japan		Oyster	7" single	DWQ 6016	
Netherlands	1976	Oyster	7" single	2066 705	
France	1976	Oyster	7" single	2066 705	
Germany	1976	Oyster	7" single	2066 705	
Belgium	1976	Oyster	7" single	2066 705	
New Zealand	1976	Oyster	7" single	2066 705	
South Africa	1977	Polydor	7" single	PS 453	

== B-Side of the single ==
The B-side track "(Wasting My Time) Thinking of You" is another Cousins/Cronk composition also appearing on the album.

The B-side of the 1975 United States release is a monophonic version of the A-side.

== Personnel ==
- Dave Cousins – lead vocals, acoustic guitar
- Dave Lambert – electric guitar, backing vocals
- Chas Cronk – bass guitar, backing vocals
- Rod Coombes – drums

with

- Robert Kirby – mellotron
- John Mealing – piano
