= Deep Cuts (Strawbs album) =

Studio album by Strawbs
- Released: October 1976
- Recorded: Spring and Summer 1976
- Genre: Progressive rock
- Length: 33:43
- Label: Oyster Records (UK)
- Producer: Rupert Holmes

Strawbs chronology
Nomadness (1975)	Deep Cuts (1976)	Burning for You (1977)

Singles from Deep Cuts
- 1. "I Only Want My Love to Grow in You"; 2. "Charmer"

Alternative Album Cover
- 2 CD set cover

Professional ratings
Review scores
Source	Rating
Allmusic	2.5/5 stars

Deep Cuts is the tenth studio album by English band Strawbs.

== Track listing ==
Side one

1. "I Only Want My Love to Grow in You" (Dave Cousins, Chas Cronk) – 3:00
2. "Turn Me Round" (Cousins, Cronk) – 3:42
3. "Hard Hard Winter" (Cousins, Robert Kirby) – 2:54
4. "My Friend Peter" (Cousins, Cronk) – 2:15
5. "The Soldier's Tale" (Cousins, Cronk) – 4:15

Side two

1. "Simple Visions" (Cousins, Cronk) – 4:40
2. "Charmer" (Cousins, Cronk) – 3:13
3. "Wasting my Time (Thinking of You)" (Cousins, Cronk) – 2:27
4. "Beside the Rio Grande" (Cousins) – 4:18
5. "So Close and Yet So Far Away" (Cousins) – 2:59

Bonus track - Japanese re-issue CD

1. "You Won't See the Light" (Dave Lambert)

== Personnel ==
- Dave Cousins – lead vocals, backing vocals, acoustic guitar
- Dave Lambert – lead vocals, backing vocals, acoustic guitar, electric guitar
- Chas Cronk – backing vocals, bass guitar, acoustic guitar
- Rod Coombes – backing vocals, drums, percussion

Additional personnel

- Robert Kirby – backing vocals, mellotron, electric piano, French horn
- John Mealing – piano, organ, electric piano, harpsichord, synthesizer
- Rupert Holmes – piano, harpsichord, clavinet, clarinet

== Recording ==
- Rupert Holmes, Jeffrey Lesser – Producers
- Jeffrey Lesser – Engineer

Recorded and mixed at The Manor, Kidlington, Oxfordshire

== Charts ==
Chart (1976)	Peak position
Canada Top Albums/CDs (RPM)	63
US Billboard 200	144

== Release history ==
Region	Date	Label	Format	Catalog	Comment
United Kingdom	1976	Oyster	stereo LP	2391 234	
United States	1976	Oyster	stereo LP	OY-1-1603	
United Kingdom	1976	Oyster	cassette	3177 234	
Canada	1976	Oyster	stereo LP	OY-1-1603	#63
	1996	Road Goes on Forever	CD	RGF/WCDCD 027	Packaged with Burning for You
Japan	2003	Muskrat	CD	RATCD 4219	includes bonus track
United Kingdom	2006	Witchwood Media	CD	WMCD 2031	
