= Déjà Fou =

Studio album by Strawbs
- Released: 30 August 2004
- Recorded: May 2004
- Genre: British folk rock
- Length: 57:15
- Label: Witchwood
- Producer: Dave Cousins

Strawbs chronology
Blue Angel (2003)	Déjà Fou (2004)	Full Bloom (2005)

Professional ratings
Review scores
Source	Rating
Allmusic	3/5 stars

Déjà Fou is the 16th studio album by English band Strawbs. The title is a play on the phrase déjà vu, French for "already seen", as the band line-up had been seen 30 years before on the Hero and Heroine album. The phrase déjà fou literally means "already mad". The album delivers the kind of British folk rock the band had built its reputation on.

== Track listing ==
1. "Riviera dei Fiori" (Dave Cousins, Dave Lambert) – 1:43
2. "Under a Cloudless Sky" (Cousins) – 5:16
3. "Face Down in the Well" (Cousins) – 5:55
4. "On a Night Like This" (Cousins) – 2:27
5. "If" (Cousins) – 5:07
6. "Cold Steel" (Lambert)) – 5:07
7. "Sunday Morning" (Cousins, Lambert) – 3:24
8. "This Barren Land" (Cousins, Lambert) – 4:47
9. "When the Lights Came On" (Lambert) – 5:43
10. "Russian Front" (Cousins, Chas Cronk, John Hawken, Lambert) – 5:40
11. "Here Today, Gone Tomorrow" (Cousins) – 4:14
12. "NRG" (Cousins) – 4:09

== Personnel ==
Strawbs

- Dave Cousins – lead vocals, backing vocals, guitar, banjo, mandolin, Chromaharp
- Dave Lambert – lead vocals, backing vocals, guitar
- Chas Cronk – backing vocals, bass guitar, guitar
- John Hawken – keyboards
- Rod Coombes – drums, percussion

Additional personnel

- Chris While – vocals
- Julie Matthews – vocals
- Adam Wakeman - piano
- Robert Kirby – French horn, string arrangements
- Michael Humphrey – violin
- Paul Robson – violin
- Jonathan Welch – viola
- Rebecca Gilliver – cello
- Nick Worters – double bass

== Recording ==
Recorded at KD's Studio, Chiswick, London

- Dave Cousins – producer
- Kenny Denton, Chas Cronk – engineers
- Roger Wake – mastering

== Release history ==
Region	Date	Label	Format	Catalog
United Kingdom	30 August 2004	Witchwood	CD	WMCD2020
