= Deadlines (Strawbs album) =

Studio album by Strawbs
- Released: 3 February 1978
- Recorded: July – October 1977
- Genre: Progressive rock
- Length: 37:51 (Original) 78:10 (Expanded)
- Label: Arista (UK)
- Producer: Jeffrey Lesser

Strawbs chronology
Burning for You (1977)	Deadlines (1978)	The Best of Strawbs (1978)

Singles from Deadlines
- 1. "Joey and Me"; 2. "New Beginnings"; 3. "I Don't Want to Talk About It"

Professional ratings
Review scores
Source	Rating
Allmusic	2/5 stars

Deadlines is the twelfth studio album by English band Strawbs.

== Production ==
Signed to Arista Records by his management team, Dave Cousins was persuaded by label head Clive Davis to record a new Strawbs album. Cousins had intended Burning for You to be the last album by the band. Cousins management also insisted that the band work with producer Jeffrey Lesser despite the fact that Cousins felt that Lesser didn't "understand the dynamics" of the band. Spending a night out with Davis, Cousins was charmed by the label head and, despite his misgivings, returned to the studio to make the band's final album of the 1970s. Lesser insisted that guitarist/singer Dave Lambert be the lead singer for the album.

Working in a studio in Dublin, Ireland in a studio owned by film composer Phillip Green. After initial recording the band and producer took the tapes to Air Studios to complete overdubbing on the 24 track tapes. Completing one day of overdubbing, the band, much to their dismay, discovered that a 4038 microphone on top of the tapes had erased a swath of the material with the drum tracks being the most notably damaged. Discouraged, the band began all over again but, according to Cousins, they failed to capture the unique flavor of those first recordings.

Mixing the album at Utopia Studios, Cousins commiserated with The Clash's Joe Strummer about the lead vocal situation. The Clash were in the next studio recording Give 'Em Enough Rope; as it turned out, producer Sandy Pearlman was as much of a problem to work with as Lesser.

Later, in preparation for the deluxe edition of "Deadlines", Cousins discovered that "Joey and Me" survived the damage and it was amended to the deluxe edition along with demos as bonus tracks in 2012. These bonus tracks plus two additional discs were included on the 2019 Esoteric reissue of "Deadlines". The second disc included the audio from the band's "BBC Sight and Sound" appearance along with a DVD of the same performance.

== Track listing ==
Side one

1. "No Return" (Dave Cousins, Dave Lambert) – 4:57
2. "Joey and Me" (Cousins, Chas Cronk, Lambert) – 3:52
3. "Sealed With a Traitor's Kiss" (Cousins) – 3:21
4. "I Don't Want to Talk About It" (Cousins, Cronk) – 3:56
5. "The Last Resort" (Cousins, Cronk, Lambert) – 4:10

Side two

1. "Time and Life" (Cousins, Cronk) – 4:11
2. "New Beginnings" (Cousins, Lambert) – 3:40
3. "Deadly Nightshade" (Cousins) – 3:56
4. "Words of Wisdom" (Cousins) – 5:48

Expanded edition (Released 23 March 2019):

Bonus Tracks Disc One:

1. Midnight (outtake previously released on A Taste of Strawbs)
2. No Return (Dave Cousins acoustic demo)
3. Sealed with a Traitor’s Kiss (Dave Cousins acoustic demo)
4. Time and Life (Dave Cousins acoustic demo)
5. Deadly Nightshade (Dave Cousins acoustic demo)
6. Words of Wisdom (Dave Cousins acoustic demo)
7. The Chosen Ones (Dave Cousins acoustic demo)
8. Sealed with a Traitor’s Kiss (First band demo)
9. No Return (Dublin production mix)
10. Joey and Me (Dublin production mix)
11. Deadly Nightshade (Dublin production mix)

Disc Two (BBC Radio One “Sight & Sound” 18 Feb., 1978)

1. Lay Down
2. The Last Resort
3. Ghosts
4. No Return
5. Heartbreaker
6. Sealed with a Traitor’s Kiss
7. Simple Visions
8. Cut Like a Diamond
9. Out in the Cold
10. Round and Round
11. Hero and Heroine

DVD:

1. Lay Down
2. The Last Resort
3. Ghosts
4. No Return
5. Heartbreaker
6. Sealed with a Traitor’s Kiss
7. Simple Visions
8. Cut Like a Diamond
9. Out in the Cold
10. Round and Round
11. Hero and Heroine

== Personnel ==
- Dave Cousins – lead vocals, backing vocals, acoustic guitar
- Dave Lambert – lead vocals, backing vocals, acoustic guitar, electric guitar
- Chas Cronk – backing vocals, bass guitar, acoustic guitar
- Tony Fernandez – drums, tambourine, tympani, bells

Additional personnel

- Robert Kirby – piano, electric piano, mellotron, organ, autoharp
- John Mealing – piano, polymoog, Minimoog, harpsichord
- Jeffrey Lesser – Producer and engineer

assisted by

- Denny Bridges
- Patrick Morley
- Andrew Brook Jackson
- Peter Wolsey
- James Guthrie

Recorded at Dublin Sound and Utopia Studios.

== Release history ==
Region	Date	Label	Format	Catalog	Comment
United Kingdom	1977	Arista	stereo LP	SPART 1036	
United States	1977	Arista	stereo LP	AB 4172	
United Kingdom	1977	Arista	cassette	TCART 1036	
United States	1996	One Way	CD	OW34499	
United Kingdom	2019	Esoteric	Compact Disc		
