= Dave Lambert (English musician) =

British guitarist

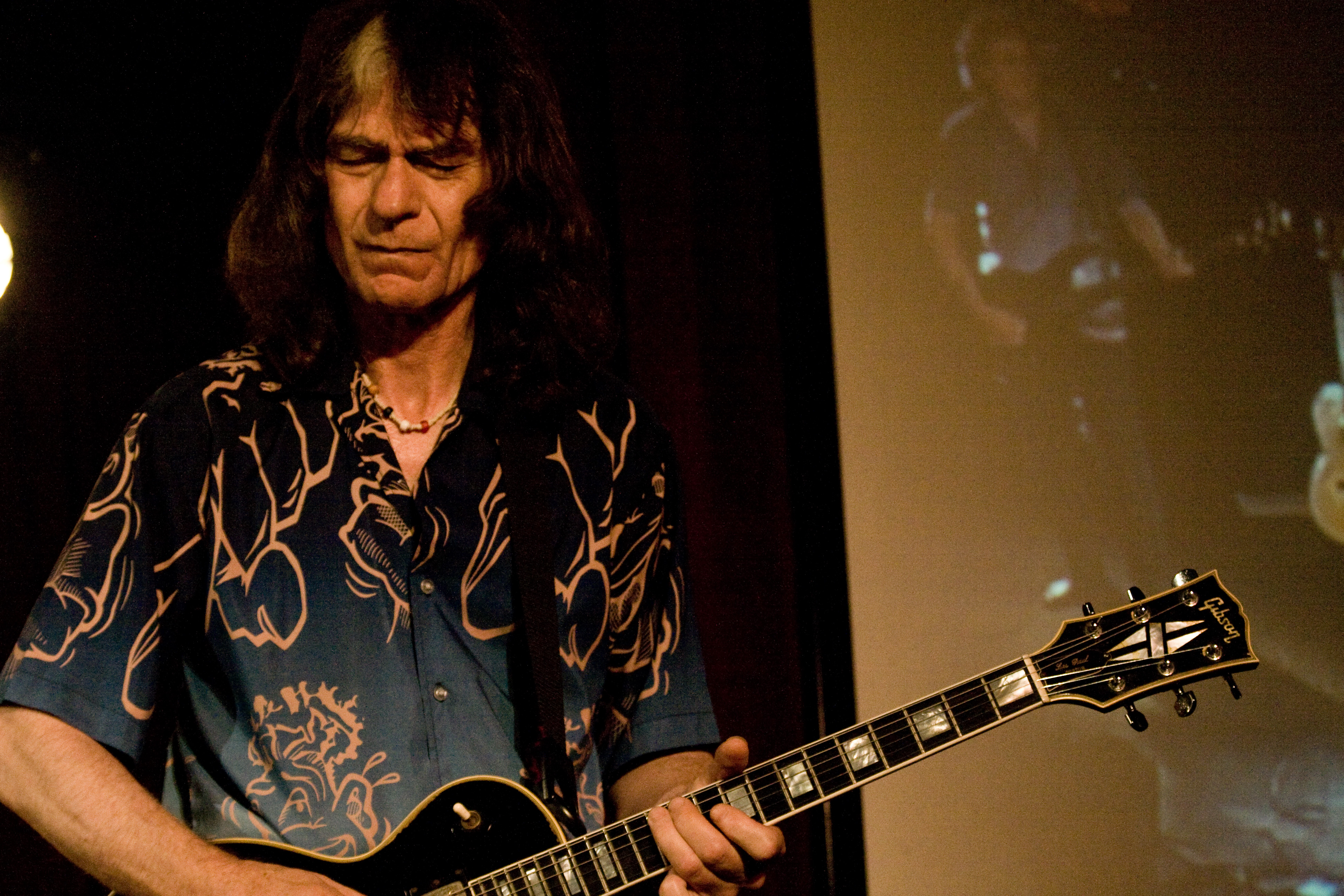
- Lambert on stage with the Strawbs at B.B. King's Blues Club in New York City, 2008

Background information
- Born: David Lambert; 8 March 1949 (age 77)
- Origin: Hounslow, Middlesex, England
- Genres: Rock; progressive rock
- Occupations: Singer-songwriter; musician
- Instruments: Guitar; vocals
- Years active: 1960s–present
- Labels: Decca; A&M; Oyster; Arista
- Member of: Strawbs
- Formerly of: King Earl Boogie Band; Fire

Dave Lambert (born 8 March 1949) is an English guitarist and singer-songwriter, who has been a member of the Strawbs at various stages of the band's career, beginning in the 1970s.

== Career ==
Lambert was born in Hounslow, Middlesex. He was a member of several bands in the 1960s, including The Syndicate, The Chains, and Friday's Chyld / Fire. In 1972 he joined the King-Earl Boogie Band, an outfit formed by two former members of Mungo Jerry. They had briefly fired Ray Dorset from Mungo Jerry with the intention of replacing him on guitar and vocals with Lambert, until Dorset was reinstated by management and record company. The King-Earl Boogie Band's debut album was produced by Dave Cousins, a move which led to Lambert playing on Cousins' solo album Two Weeks Last Summer.

Lambert then joined Cousins in Strawbs on guitar and vocals later in 1972, replacing Tony Hooper, and playing on the album Bursting at the Seams, which reached number two in the UK Albums Chart, the album including Lambert's song "The Winter and the Summer". In 1973 Lambert and founding member Dave Cousins started a new line-up of the band that continued until they split up in 1978. He subsequently worked as a songwriter in partnership with Chas Cronk, recorded as a solo artist and spent time working as a ski instructor. Lambert rejoined Strawbs in April 1999 and was a member of the band till 2021 and the album Settlement. In 2006 he was part of a briefly-reformed Fire.

== Discography ==
=== Albums ===
==== Fire ====
- The Magic Shoemaker (1970)
- Underground and Overhead (1997)

==== King-Earl Boogie Band ====
- Trouble at Mill (1972)

==== Strawbs ====
- Bursting at the Seams (1973)
- Hero and Heroine (1974)
- Ghosts (1974)
- Nomadness (1975)
- Deep Cuts (1976)
- Burning for You (1977)
- Deadlines (1978)
- Heartbreak Hill (1978)
- Halcyon Days (1997) (compilation)
- Concert Classics (1999) (Live BBC "Sight and Sound" performance from 1977)
- The Complete Strawbs (2000) (30th anniversary concert at Chiswick House)
- The Collection (2002) (compilation)
- Tears and Pavan – An Introduction to Strawbs (2002) (compilation)
- 20th Century Masters: The Millennium Collection: The Best of Strawbs (2003) (compilation)
- Blue Angel (2003) (includes re-recorded songs from Two Weeks Last Summer and Bursting at the Seams)
- Déjà Fou (2004)
- Strawbs Live at Nearfest 2004 (2005)
- A Taste of Strawbs (2006) (box with 4 CDs, recordings 1967–2006)
- Strawbs NY '75 (2007) (live recording of a 1975 show)
- Lay Down with the Strawbs (2008) (double CD recorded live at The Robin in Bilston 5 March 2006)
- The Broken Hearted Bride (2008) (with the Hero and Heroine line-up)
- Dancing to the Devil's Beat (2009) (new line-up with Oliver Wakeman on keyboards)
- Hero & Heroine in Ascencia (2011)
- The Ferryman’s Curse (2017)
- Settlement (2021)

==== Acoustic Strawbs ====
- Baroque & Roll (2001)
- Full Bloom (2005) (live)
- Painted Sky (2005) (live)

==== Solo ====
- Framed (1979)
- Work in Progress (2004)

==== Lambert Cronk ====
- Touch the Earth (2007)

=== Singles ===
Unless otherwise stated, the details are of the singles released in the UK.

==== Fire ====
- "Father's Name is Dad"/"Treacle Toffee World" (1968)
- "Round the Gum Tree"/"Toothie Ruthie" (1968)

==== King-Earl Boogie Band ====
- "Plastic Jesus"/"If the Lord Don't Get You" (1972)
- "Starlight"/"Goin' to German" (1972)

==== Strawbs ====
- "Lay Down"/"Backside" (1972)
- "Part of the Union"/"Will You Go" (1973)
- "Shine on Silver Sun"/"And Wherefore" (1973)
- "Hero and Heroine"/"Why" (1974)
- "Hold on to Me (The Winter Long)"/"Where do You Go" (1974)
- "Round and Round"/"Heroine's Theme" (1974) (US and Italy only)
- "Grace Darling"/"Changes Arranges" (1974)
- "Angel Wine"/"Grace Darling" (1975) (Japan only)
- "Lemon Pie"/"Don't Try to Change Me" (1975)
- "Little Sleepy" (1975) (US and Portugal only)
- "I Only Want My Love to Grow in You"/"Wasting My Time (Thinking of You)" (1976)
- "So Close and Yet So Far Away"/"The Soldier's Tale" (1976) (US only)
- "Charmer"/"Beside the Rio Grande" (1976)
- "Back in the Old Routine"/"Burning for You" (1977)
- "Keep on Trying"/"Simple Visions" (1977)
- "Heartbreaker" (1977) (US and South Africa only)
- "Joey and Me"/"Deadly Nightshade" (1978)
- "New Beginnings"/"Words of Wisdom" (1978)
- "I Don't Want to Talk About It"/"The Last Resort" (1978) (US only)

==== Solo ====
- "Take a Little Bit of My Life" (1979)
