= Third World War (band) =

English rock band (1970–1972)

Third World War were an English blues rock, hard rock, and proto-punk band formed in 1970 by manager and producer John Fenton together with songwriters Terry Stamp and Jim Avery. Fenton came up with the band's name and provided a large part of its musical direction; Phill Brown, the recording engineer on the band's first album, quotes him as saying, "I want a no-bullshit, working class band—I've had enough of all this pseudo peace crap." Due to this attitude, the band's raucous sound and its revolutionary lyrics, they have been described as "England's first punk band" (after Crushed Butler)

In 1970 the band recorded their first album, Third World War, which was released in 1971 on Fly Records. Largely, the themes of the album espoused far-left political sentiment. It featured Stamp on rhythm guitar and vocals, Avery on bass, Mick Lieber on lead guitars and Fred Smith (drums). Tony Ashton also added piano on some of the tracks, and Jim Price (trumpet and trombone) and Bobby Keyes (saxophone), American musicians who were playing with the Rolling Stones, provided some horn parts.

At the time the album was released, the band had yet to play live. In the summer of 1971 Avery, Fenton and Stamp reconfigured the group to get "the 'best' live grouping," which was Stamp, Avery, John Hawken on piano, John Knightsbridge on lead guitar, and Paul Olsen on drums. They toured Finland, playing 35 gigs in 30 days, and then went on to perform at a number of festivals across Europe. 1971 also saw the release of the band's two singles, "Ascension Day"/"Teddy Teeth Goes Sailing" and "A Little Bit Of Urban Rock"/"Working Class Man", both of which appeared on Fly Records.

By the time Third World War went into the studio in 1972 to record their second album the management at Fly Records were becoming unhappy with the band's lack of commercial potential. Hoping to guide the group towards more mainstream acceptability, the label demanded the song "Coshing Old Lady Blues" be removed from the album. Fenton refused to release the album without that track, so Third World War II came out instead on The Who's Track Records label. Personnel on the record was the touring group from the previous summer, except that Craig Collinge replaced Olsen on drums. During the recording of the album, Fenton ran out of money and could no longer pay the musicians, and once the record was finished the band broke up.
