= The Broken Hearted Bride =

Studio album by Strawbs
- Released: September 2008
- Recorded: 2008
- Genre: British folk rock
- Length: 59:25
- Label: Witchwood
- Producer: Chris Tsangarides

Strawbs chronology
Lay Down with the Strawbs (2008)	The Broken Hearted Bride (2008)	Dancing to the Devil's Beat (2009)

The Broken Hearted Bride is the 17th studio album by English band Strawbs.

== Reception ==
Professional ratings
Review scores
Source	Rating
Allmusic	3.5/5 stars

== Track listing ==
1. "The Call to Action" (Dave Cousins) – 7:38
2. "Christmas Cheer (Everything's Going to be Alright)" (Cousins, Chas Cronk) – 4:39
3. "Too Many Angels" (Cousins, Cronk) – 5:55
4. "The Broken Hearted Bride" (Cousins) – 5:11
5. "Shadowland" (Dave Lambert) – 4:48
6. "Through Aphrodite's Eyes" (Cousins, Cronk) – 7:26
7. "Deep in the Darkest Night" (Cousins) – 4:38
8. "You Know as Well as I" (Lambert) – 3:44
9. "Everybody Knows" (Cronk) – 4:30
10. "Action Replay" (Cousins) – 4:54
11. "We'll Meet Again Sometime" (Cousins) – 6:02

== Personnel ==
Strawbs

- Dave Cousins – lead vocals, backing vocals, guitar, keyboards
- Dave Lambert – lead vocals, backing vocals, guitar
- Chas Cronk – backing vocals, bass guitar, guitar, keyboards, programming
- John Hawken – keyboards
- Rod Coombes – drums

Additional personnel

- Ian Cutler – fiddle
- The Big Deal Choir – vocals

Steve Grant
Vince Martyn
Gordon May
Chris Tophill
Howard Werth
Sophie Morish
Charlotte Tophill
Elizabeth Tophill
Frances Tophill

== Release history ==
Region	Date	Label	Format	Catalog
United Kingdom	September 2008	Witchwood	CD	WMCD2044
