= Nomadness =

Studio album by Strawbs
- Released: November 1975
- Recorded: June – July 1975
- Genre: Rock
- Length: 40:27
- Label: A&M (UK)
- Producer: Tom Allom

Strawbs chronology
Ghosts (1975)	Nomadness (1975)	Deep Cuts (1976)

Professional ratings
Review scores
Source	Rating
Allmusic	4.5/5 stars

Nomadness is the ninth studio album by English band Strawbs. It was their last album recorded for A&M Records and their first with no full-time keyboard player since 1970's Dragonfly. Indeed, Strawbs would not feature a full-time keyboard player until 1978 when Andy Richards joined the band. All the tracks are timed at less than five minutes giving the album a lighter, less 'epic' feel in contrast to the previous three studio albums. Rick Wakeman came back to help on electric harpsichord on one song.

== Track listing ==
Side one

1. "To Be Free" (Dave Cousins) – 4:17
2. "Little Sleepy" (Dave Lambert) – 4:10
3. "The Golden Salamander" (Cousins) – 4:57
4. "Absent Friend (How I Need You)" (Cousins) – 4:42
5. "Back on the Farm" (Cousins) – 2:42

Side two

1. "So Shall Our Love Die?" (Cousins) – 3:39
2. "Tokyo Rosie" (Cousins) – 2:48
3. "A Mind of My Own" (Rod Coombes) – 4:33
4. "Hanging in the Gallery" (Cousins) – 4:32
5. "The Promised Land" (Chas Cronk) – 4:07

Bonus tracks - 2008 reissue CD

1. "Still Small Voice" (Cousins) – 2:27
2. "It's Good to See the Sun" (Cousins) – 4:05

== Personnel ==
=== Strawbs ===
- Dave Cousins – lead vocals, (tracks 1, 3, 4, 6, 7, 9 and 10) backing vocals, acoustic guitar, dulcimer, banjo
- Dave Lambert – lead vocals (tracks 2, 5, 8 and 10), backing vocals, acoustic guitar, electric guitar
- Chas Cronk – backing vocals, bass guitar
- Rod Coombes – backing vocals, drums, acoustic guitar

=== Additional Personnel ===
- John Mealing – piano (tracks 4 and 6), organ (tracks 1, 4, 5, 9 and 10), electric piano (track 7)
- Tony Carr – congas
- Jack Emblow – accordion (track 5)
- Tommy Eyre – piano (tracks 8 and 10), clavinet (track 8), synthesizer (track 8)
- John Lumley-Saville – synthesizer (track 9)
- Rick Wakeman – electric harpsichord (track 7)
- Tom Allom – cymbalum (track 7)

== Recording ==
- Tom Allom – Producer
- Vic Gamm – Engineer

Recorded at Sound Techniques, London

== Charts ==
Chart (1975)	Peak position
US Billboard 200	147

== Release history ==
Region	Date	Label	Format	Catalog	Comment
United Kingdom	1975	A&M	stereo LP	AMLH 68331	
United States	1975	A&M	stereo LP	SP 4544	
	September 2008	A&M	CD	5302822	2 bonus tracks
