= Dancing to the Devil's Beat =

Studio album by Strawbs
- Released: 18 August 2009
- Recorded: April 2009 – May 2009
- Genre: Progressive rock
- Length: 45:19
- Label: Witchwood Media
- Producer: Chris Tsangarides

Strawbs chronology
The Broken Hearted Bride (2008)	Dancing to the Devil's Beat (2009)	The Ferryman's Curse (2017)

Professional ratings
Review scores
Source	Rating
Allmusic	3.5/5 stars

Dancing to the Devil's Beat is a studio album by English band Strawbs.

== Track listing ==
1. "Revenge (Can Be So Sweet)" (Dave Cousins, Chas Cronk)– 5:18
2. "Beneath the Angry Sky" (Cousins, Cronk) – 4:29
3. "Copenhagen" (Cousins, Cronk) – 4:46
4. "Pro Patria Suite" – 7:44
  "Back Along (We Were Young) (Cousins)"
  "All for Each Other (Cousins)"
  "Home Is Where the Heart Was Ever" (Cousins, Oliver Wakeman)
5. "Where Silent Shadows Fall" (Cousins) – 5:45
6. "The Man Who Would Never Leave Grimsby" (Dave Lambert) – 5:01
7. "The Ballad of Jay and Rose Mary" (Cousins) – 4:17
8. "Dancing to the Devil's Beat" (Cousins) - 3:38
9. "Oh How She Changed 2009" (Cousins) – 4:21

== Personnel ==
Strawbs

- Dave Cousins – vocals, guitar, banjo
- Dave Lambert – vocals, guitar
- Chas Cronk – vocals, bass guitar, guitar, keyboards, programming
- Oliver Wakeman – piano, Hammond organ, keyboards, orchestrations
- Rod Coombes – drums

Additional personnel

- Ian Cutler – fiddle
- Vince Martin – harmonica
- Stephen Mission – cornet
- Keith Deary - cornet

and the congregation of St. Christopher-at-Cliffe

== Release history ==
Region	Date	Label	Format	Catalog	Comments
United Kingdom	2009	Witchwood Media	compact disc	WMCD 2045	
