= Shine on Silver Sun =

Single by Strawbs

from the album Hero and Heroine
- B-side: "And Wherefore"
- Released: 31 August 1973
- Genre: Progressive rock
- Length: 2:46
- Label: A&M
- Songwriter(s): Dave Cousins

Strawbs singles chronology
"Part of the Union" (1973)	"Shine on Silver Sun" (1973)	"Hero and Heroine" (1974)

"Shine on Silver Sun" is a song by English band Strawbs featured on their 1974 album Hero and Heroine. It is written by Dave Cousins and was intended as a "come-back" single after the post-"Part of the Union" band split. The single was a minor success peaking at number 34 in the UK Singles Chart.

== B-Side ==
The B-side track "And Wherefore" is a band composition, not released on any studio album. It forms the second part of the composite song "Why and Wherefore" which appears on the compilation/rarities album Halcyon Days.

== Personnel ==
- Dave Cousins – vocals, acoustic guitar
- Dave Lambert – backing vocals, electric guitar
- Chas Cronk – backing vocals, bass guitar
- Rod Coombes – drums
- John Hawken – piano, mellotron
