= Burning for You =

Studio album by Strawbs
- Released: 1977
- Recorded: March 1977
- Genre: Progressive rock
- Length: 36:29
- Label: Oyster/Polydor
- Producer: Jeffrey Lesser

Strawbs chronology
Deep Cuts (1976)	Burning for You (1977)	Deadlines (1978)

Singles from Burning for You
- 1. "Back in the Old Routine" Released: 27 May 1977; 2. "Keep on Trying" Released: 19 August 1977; 3. "Heartbreaker"

Alternative Album Cover
- 2 CD set cover

Professional ratings
Review scores
Source	Rating
Allmusic	2/5 stars
Music Week	3/4 stars

Burning for You is the eleventh studio album by English band Strawbs, with cover art by Patrick Woodroffe.

== Recording ==
The producer of the album Jeffrey Lesser was, according to songwriter/singer Dave Cousins, "...a great engineer but didn't understand the dynamics of the band". The album was intended to be the final one by the band but Cousins was persuaded to carry on when he met with Clive Davis of Arista Records. The final track here "Goodbye" was meant to be his final word on his career leading the band.

== Track listing ==
Side one

1. "Burning for Me" (Dave Cousins, John Mealing) – 4:01
2. "Cut Like a Diamond" (Cousins, Chas Cronk) – 3:44
3. "I Feel Your Loving Coming On" (Dave Lambert) – 2:56
4. "Barcarole (For the Death of Venice)" (Cousins, Cronk) – 3:25
5. "Alexander the Great" (Cousins, Lambert) – 3:59

Side two

1. "Keep on Trying" (Cousins, Cronk) – 3:15
2. "Back in the Old Routine" (Cousins, Cronk, Lambert) – 3:17
3. "Heartbreaker" (Lambert) – 4:40
4. "Carry Me Home" (Cronk) – 3:28
5. "Goodbye (Is Not an Easy Word to Say)" (Cousins) – 3:44

Esoteric expanded edition (released 19 March 2020)

1. "Joey and Me" (Cousins)
2. " Goodbye” (Alternate mix)(Cousins)
3. "Barcarole (Alternate mix)(Cousins & Cronk)
4. "Heartbreaker” (Dave Cousins and The Intergalactic Touring Band) (Cousins)

== Personnel ==
- Dave Cousins – vocals (1–10) (lead vocals 1, 2, 4, 5, 6, 10) acoustic guitar (2–4, 6–8)
- Dave Lambert – lead guitar (1–6, 8–10), vocals (3–9) (lead vocals 3, 6, 7, 8, 9), acoustic guitar (5, 8), acoustic lead guitar (7)
- Chas Cronk – bass (1–10), vocals (3, 4, 6, 7), acoustic guitar (7)
- Rod Coombes – drums (1–3, 5–10)

Additional personnel

- Robert Kirby – piano (3), synthesizer (3), orchestral arrangement (3, 9), electric piano (4, 6, 9), Mellotron (4–6, 8), clavinet (8), acoustic guitar (7)
- John Mealing – piano (1, 7, 9, 10), synthesizer (1, 3–5, 8), Mellotron (3), harpsichord (2), tubular bells (3), organ (4), orchestral arrangement (1, 10)
- Jeffrey Lesser – Producer and engineer

assisted by

- Robin Freeman

Recorded and mixed at Relight Studios, Hilvarenbeek, The Netherlands

== Charts ==
Chart (1977)	Peak position
US Billboard 200	175

== Release history ==
Region	Date	Label	Format	Catalog	Comment
United Kingdom	1977	Oyster	stereo LP	2391 287	
United States	1977	Oyster	stereo LP	OY-1-1604	
United Kingdom	1977	Oyster	cassette	3177 287	
	1996	Road Goes on Forever	CD	RGF/WCDCD 027	Packaged with Deep Cuts
Japan	2003	Muskrat	CD	RATCD 4220	
