= Ghosts (Strawbs album) =

Studio album by Strawbs
- Released: January 1975
- Recorded: July–September 1974
- Genre: Progressive rock
- Length: 41:04
- Labels: A&M, (UK)
- Producer: Tom Allom

Strawbs chronology
| Strawbs by Choice (1974) | Ghosts (1975) | Nomadness (1975) |

Singles from Ghosts
- 1. "Grace Darling"; 2. "Lemon Pie"

Professional ratings
Review scores
| Source | Rating |
|---|---|
| Allmusic | 4.5/5 stars |

Ghosts is the eighth studio album by English band Strawbs.

== Track listing ==
Side one

1. "Ghosts" (Dave Cousins) – 8:31
  "Sweet Dreams"
  "Night Light"
  "Guardian Angel"
  "Night Light"
2. "Lemon Pie" (Cousins) – 4:03
3. "Starshine/Angel Wine" (Chas Cronk) – 5:15
4. "Where Do You Go (When You Need a Hole to Crawl In)" (Cousins) – 3:02

Side two

1. "The Life Auction" – 6:52
  "Impressions of Southall from the Train" (Cousins, John Hawken)
  "The Auction" (Cousins, Dave Lambert)
2. "Don't Try to Change Me" (Lambert) – 4:28
3. "Remembering" (Hawken) – 0:54
4. "You and I (When We Were Young)" (Cousins) – 4:04
5. "Grace Darling" (Cousins) – 3:55

Bonus track – A&M remastered CD

1. "Changes Arrange Us" (Rod Coombes) – 3:55 (Rod Coombes sings lead vocals and plays guitar on this track)

== Personnel ==
- Dave Cousins – lead vocals, backing vocals, acoustic guitar, electric guitar, recorder
- Dave Lambert – lead vocals, backing vocals, acoustic & electric guitar
- John Hawken – piano, electric piano, harpsichord, mellotron, Moog synthesizer, Hammond organ, pipe organ
- Chas Cronk – backing vocals, bass guitar, acoustic guitar
- Rod Coombes – backing vocals, drums, congas, percussion

Additional personnel

- Claire Deniz – cello on "Starshine/Angel Wine"
- Robert Kirby – choral arrangements

== Recording ==
- Tom Allom – Producer and Engineer
- Mick Glossop – assistant engineer

Recorded at The Manor, Kidlington, Oxfordshire; Sound Techniques, London; TPA, London and the chapel of Charterhouse School, Godalming, Surrey between 16 July and 13 September 1974. "Where Do You Go" was recorded at Island Studios, London, on 30 July 1973.

== Charts ==
| Chart (1975) | Peak position |
|---|---|
| Canada Top Albums/CDs (RPM) | 12 |
| US Billboard 200 | 47 |

== Release history ==
| Region | Date | Label | Format | Catalog | Comment |
|---|---|---|---|---|---|
| United Kingdom | 1975 | A&M | stereo LP | AMLH 68277 | |
| United States | 1975 | A&M | stereo LP | SP 4506 | |
| Canada | 1975 | A&M | stereo LP | SP 4506 | Highest chart placement #12 on RPM chart April 1975 |
| Germany | 1975 | A&M | stereo LP | 88564 | |
| United Kingdom | 1975 | A&M | Cassette | CAM 68277 | |
| South Korea | 1998 | Si-Wan | CD | SRMC 0085 | |
| | 1998 | A&M | CD | 540 937-2 | Remastered with bonus track. |
