= Robert Kirby =

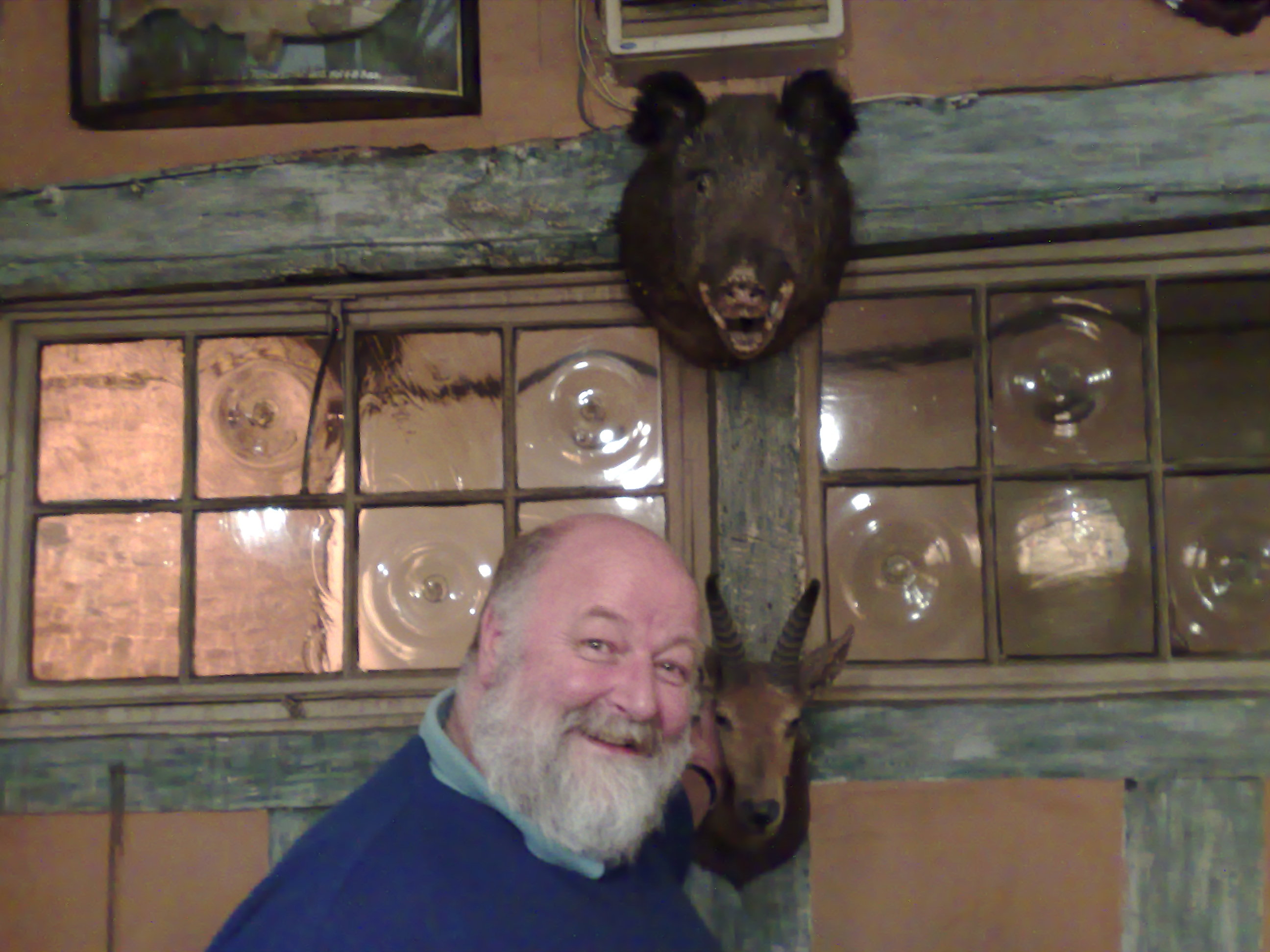

Background information
- Born: Robert Bruce Kirby; 16 April 1948; Bishop's Stortford, Hertfordshire, England
- Died: 3 October 2009 (aged 61) London, England
- Genres: Folk rock, progressive rock
- Occupations: Arranger, musician
- Instrument: Keyboards
- Years active: 1960s–2009
- Labels: A&M, Island
- Formerly of: Nick Drake, Strawbs

Robert Bruce Kirby (16 April 1948 – 3 October 2009) was an English arranger of string sections for rock and folk music. He worked on the Nick Drake albums Five Leaves Left and Bryter Layter, and with Vashti Bunyan, Elton John, Ralph McTell, Strawbs, Paul Weller and Elvis Costello.

== Early life ==
Robert Kirby was born on 16 April 1948 in Bishop's Stortford, Hertfordshire, into a working class family. He won a scholarship to Bishop's Stortford College, an independent school in Hertfordshire.

== Cambridge University ==
Kirby matriculated at Cambridge University in October 1967 as a choral exhibitioner at Caius College, intending to become a music teacher. He went on to perform with a choral group called The Gentle Power of Song, who recorded a single and two albums for Polydor.

His tutor once told him that his compositions sounded like a breakfast cereal commercial. This was intended as an insult, but Kirby took this as his high praise: "As good as that, eh?".

At Cambridge, Kirby made friends with Paul Wheeler. They were both members of the Caius Breakfast Club, also called "The Loungers". The rules included eating a Loungers' breakfast on Sundays, and 'stand[ing] by ye gate once a day and observ[ing] what strange creatures God hath made'. An outsider (the 'Oddefellowe') was permitted to become a member. Robert and Paul were both friends with Nick Drake so they invited him to be the Oddefellowe. A line in Drake's song "Way To Blue" seems to echo one of the rules of the Loungers:

"We will wait at your gate, hoping like the blind..."

== The May Ball ==
Kirby recruited eight musicians (seven women and one man) to play alongside Nick Drake at the Caius May Ball. Kirby wore evening dress, and the seven women wore black ankle-length dresses with white feather boas. They performed in the library. Four of the songs were with the string orchestra and a couple of others were Drake solo. After every third song, they played classical music (Leopold Mozart and Tomaso Albinoni).

== Five Leaves Left ==
When Joe Boyd recruited Drake to record an album, he already had a string arranger in mind, Richard A. Hewson. Drake rejected the few arrangements that Hewson had produced and announced that he already had a friend at university who could do a better job – that was Kirby. Drake had decided to leave university without completing his final year. When Kirby was offered the contract to arrange music for an entire album, he too gave up Cambridge University. Though Kirby arranged and conducted strings for the majority of Five Leaves, Harry Robinson was commissioned to arrange the strings for the centrepiece song, "River Man". John Wood, the album's sound engineer describes Kirby's involvement:

The first strong memory I have of Nick was at the second or third session for Five Leaves Left. Richard Hewson, a well known arranger, and a fifteen piece orchestra had been brought in to arrange Nick's songs. Nick started getting hotter and hotter under the collar. He was very young and he had struck me as a person you could push about – some people in a recording session will do whatever you tell them – but he was getting quietly more and more aggravated, and in the end he dug his heels in and dismissed the arrangements. He said he'd get this friend at Cambridge, Robert Kirby, he thought would be much more sympathetic to what he was doing. Robert had never before done anything in his life in a recording studio. But two weeks later we booked him together with a bunch of musicians – a smaller bunch than the first time, I remember... We were flabbergasted. He was so good.

== Later career ==
Although by 1978 Kirby had recorded arrangements for over 40 albums, it was a struggle to make ends meet. In the 1980s he went to work in marketing, becoming a director of Ipsos. He was rumoured still to have his scores for Drake's records in his mother's potting shed. (He also was for three years – 1975–1978 – one of the two keyboard players for Strawbs, touring the UK and internationally, and getting some composing credits on the albums Deep Cuts, Deadlines and Burning for You). He returned to music full-time in the 2000s, doing further arranging for Strawbs with Baroque & Roll (2001), Déjà Fou (2004) and Dancing to the Devil's Beat (2009). He talks extensively about his career in Nick Awde's 2008 book Mellotron, subtitled The Machine and the Musicians That Revolutionized Rock, which opens with a quote from him.

One of his lasting associations was with Shelagh McDonald. Sandy Roberton, McDonald's then producer, invited her to visit Kirby's flat. He took an instant liking to her and did orchestral arrangements for songs on her first two albums, Stargazer and Album.

== Public performances of Nick Drake's music ==
On 2 July 2005, Kirby conducted an 18-piece orchestra in Manhattan's Central Park for a show of Drake's music, using his original scores. Five Leaves Left was performed in its entirety as well as excerpts from Bryter Layter and Made To Love Magic. The show starred guitarist Josh Max and singer Julie James of the Manhattan-based group The Maxes and was attended by 3,000 Drake fans from all over the US. Teddy Thompson, Linda and Richard Thompson's son, appeared as a special guest, singing "Pink Moon" and "From The Morning." Manhattan singer Joe Hurley of Rogue's March sang "Fly" and "Place to be."

== Death ==
Kirby died in a West London hospital following emergency heart surgery after a short illness on 3 October 2009; he was 61 years old.

== Discography ==
- Nick Drake: Five Leaves Left (1969)
- Nick Drake: Bryter Layter (1970)
- Vashti Bunyan: Just Another Diamond Day (1970)
- Bernie Taupin: Bernie Taupin (1970)
- Shelagh McDonald: Stargazer (1971)
- Audience: The House on the Hill (1971)
- Gillian McPherson: Poets and Painters and Performers of Blues (1971)
- Ralph McTell: You Well-Meaning Brought Me Here (1971)
- Keith Christmas: Pigmy (1971)
- Tim Hart and Maddy Prior: Summer Solstice (1971)
- Cochise: So Far (1971)
- Steve Gibbons: Short Stories (1971)
- Andy Roberts: Nina and the Dream Tree (1971)
- John Kongos: John Kongos (1971)
- Spirogyra: St. Radigunds (1971)
- Elton John: Madman Across The Water (1971)
- Claggers: Chumley's Laughing Gear (1971)
- Strawbs: Grave New World (1972)
- David Ackles: American Gothic (1972)
- Mick Audsley: Dark and Devil Waters (1972)
- B.J. Cole: The New Hovering Dog (1972)
- David Elliott: David Elliott (1972)
- Dave Cousins: Two Weeks Last Summer (1972)
- Strawbs: Bursting at the Seams (1972)
- Mike Silver: Troubadour (1973)
- Lynsey De Paul: Surprise (1973)
- Steve Ashley: Stroll On (1974)
- Steve Ashley: Speedy Return (1975)
- John Cale: Helen of Troy (1975)
- Gary Shearston: The Greatest Show on Earth (1975)
- Richard Digance: Trading the Boards (1975)
- Chris DeBurgh: Spanish Train and Other Stories (1975)
- Strawbs: Deep Cuts (1976)
- Design: By Design (1976) (three tracks)
- Spriguns: Time Will Pass (1977)
- Sandy Denny: Rendezvous (1977)
- Strawbs: Burning for You (1977)
- Strawbs: Deadlines (1978)
- Arthur Brown: Chisholm in my Bosom (1978)
- Richard and Linda Thompson: First Light (1978)
- Roger McGough: Summer with Monika (1978)
- Iain Matthews: Stealin' Home (1978)
- Jim Rafferty: Solid Logic (1979)
- Ralph McTell: Slide Away the Screen (1979)
- Aj Webber: Of This Land (1980)
- Elvis Costello: Almost Blue (1982)
- Nick Lowe: Nick Lowe and his Cowboy Outfit (1984)
- Any Trouble: Wrong Eng of the Race (1984)
- London Symphony Orchestra: Screen Classics, Vol. 7 (1994)
- Catchers: Stooping to Fit (1998)
- Ben & Jason: Hello (1999)
- Steve Ashley: The Test of Time (1999)
- Paul Weller: Heliocentric (2000)
- Acoustic Strawbs: Baroque & Roll (2001)
- Flemming: Starry Night (2001)
- Flemming: Old Boys, Chances for tomorrow (2002)
- Linda Thompson: Fashionably Late (2002)
- Nick Drake: Made to Love Magic (2004)
- Henrik Levy: A Letter from a City Man (2004)
- Strawbs: Déjà Fou (2004)
- Vashti Bunyan: Lookaftering (2005)
- Steve Ashley: Live in Concert (2006)
- The Magic Numbers: Those The Brokes (2006)
- a balladeer: Panama (2006)
- Teddy Thompson: Upfront & Down Low (2007)
- Linda Thompson: Versatile Heart (2007)
- Steve Ashley: Time and Tide (2007)
- Luke Jackson: ...And Then Some (2008)
- Strawbs: Dancing to the Devil's Beat (2009)
- James Edge and the Mindstep: In The Hills, The Cities (2010)
- The Magic Numbers: The Runaway (2010)
