= Autumn (Strawbs song) =

Single by Strawbs
- B-side: "Where Do You Go (When You Need a Hole to Crawl In)"
- Released: 1974
- Genre: Progressive rock
- Label: A&M
- Songwriters: Dave Cousins, John Hawken

Strawbs singles chronology
"Hero and Heroine" (1974)	"Autumn" (1974)	"Grace Darling" (1974)

"Autumn" is a three-part song by English band Strawbs featured on their 1974 album Hero and Heroine. The final part "The Winter Long" was released as a single in 1974 under the title "Hold on to Me (The Winter Long)".

== Heroine's Theme ==
The first part of the three part song is an instrumental written by keyboardist John Hawken. It was later released as a single in the United States due to demand from black radio stations. The music begins with a menacing riff played on a Moog synthesizer, gradually builds to a climax and then segues into the much quieter second part of the song.

== Deep Summer Sleep ==
"Deep Summer Sleep" is written and sung by Dave Cousins.

== The Winter Long ==
The final part of the song is written by Dave Cousins but sung by Dave Lambert. It was released as a single in the UK in 1974. Several overseas releases followed.

=== Release history ===
Region	Date	Label	Format	Catalog
United Kingdom	1974	A&M	7" single	AMS7117
Germany	1974	A&M	7" single	13479 AT
Brazil	1974	A&M	7" single	S7AM-5122
Thailand	1974	Cashbox	7" single plus 3 other tracks	KS-271

== B-side of the single ==
The B-side track "Where Do You Go (When You Need a Hole to Crawl In)" is a Dave Cousins composition, featured on the 1974 album Ghosts album.

== Personnel ==
- Dave Cousins – lead vocals, backing vocals, acoustic guitar
- Dave Lambert – lead vocals, backing vocals, electric guitar
- Chas Cronk – backing vocals, bass guitar
- Rod Coombes – drums
- John Hawken – piano, Mellotron, organ, synthesizer
