= Hero and Heroine =

Studio album by Strawbs
- Released: March 1974
- Recorded: November 1973
- Studios: Rosenberg Studios, Copenhagen
- Genre: Progressive rock
- Length: 39:36
- Labels: A&M, (UK)
- Producers: Dave Cousins, Tom Allom

Strawbs chronology
| All Our Own Work (1973) | Hero and Heroine (1974) | Strawbs by Choice (1974) |

Singles from Hero and Heroine
- 1. "Shine on Silver Sun"; 2. "Hero and Heroine"; 3. "Hold on to Me (The Winter Long)"

Professional ratings
Review scores
| Source | Rating |
|---|---|
| AllMusic | 4.5/5 stars |

Hero and Heroine is the seventh studio album by English band Strawbs.

== Background ==
After the tour supporting the previous album, Bursting at the Seams (1973), there was an acrimonious split leaving only Dave Cousins and Dave Lambert to rebuild the band. John Hawken of The Nashville Teens and Renaissance on keyboards, Chas Cronk on bass and Rod Coombes on drums from Juicy Lucy and Stealers Wheel completed the line-up. The new line-up gelled very quickly and studio sessions were very productive. The album was released first in the US to a warm reception, and then in the UK where reviews were less positive. The album only reached number 35 on the UK Album Charts and the band increasingly began to look to North America for a successful future.

All band members made writing contributions, notably Chas Cronk, with whom Cousins would write many songs on future albums.

== Critical reception ==
Stephen Lambe, author of Citizens of Hope and Glory: The Story of Progressive Rock, has called it "their most prog album" and has identified John Hawken's Mellotron playing as "a particular highlight". The album ranked number 44 in 50 Greatest Prog Rock Albums of All Time list of Rolling Stone magazine.

== Track listing ==
Side one
| No. | Title | Writer(s) | Length |
|---|---|---|---|
| 1. | "Autumn": I. "Heroine's Theme"; II. "Deep Summer Sleep"; III. "The Winter Long"" | John Hawken, Dave Cousins | 8:27 |
| 2. | "Sad Young Man" | Rod Coombes | 4:09 |
| 3. | "Just Love" | Dave Lambert | 3:41 |
| 4. | "Shine on Silver Sun" | Cousins | 2:46 |

Side two
| No. | Title | Writer(s) | Length |
|---|---|---|---|
| 5. | "Hero and Heroine" | Cousins | 3:29 |
| 6. | "Midnight Sun" | Chas Cronk, Cousins | 3:06 |
| 7. | "Out in the Cold" | Cousins | 3:19 |
| 8. | "Round and Round" | Cousins | 4:44 |
| 9. | "Lay a Little Light On Me" | Cousins | 3:27 |
| 10. | "Hero's Theme" | Lambert | 2:28 |

The following tracks did not feature on the original vinyl release, but were included as bonus tracks on the A&M reissue.

Bonus tracks
| No. | Title | Writer(s) | Length |
|---|---|---|---|
| 11. | "Still Small Voice" | Cousins | 2:28 |
| 12. | "Lay a Little Light On Me (Early Version)" | Cousins | 2:20 |

== Personnel ==
- Dave Cousins – lead vocals, backing vocals, acoustic guitar, electric guitar
- Dave Lambert – lead vocals, backing vocals, acoustic guitar, electric guitar
- Chas Cronk – backing vocals, bass guitar, synthesizer
- John Hawken – organ, piano, electric piano, Mellotron, synthesizer
- Rod Coombes – backing vocals, drums, percussion

Additional personnel

- Claire Deniz – cello on "Midnight Sun"

== Recording ==
- Dave Cousins, Tom Allom – Producers
- Tom Allom, Freddy Hansson – Engineers

Recorded at Rosenberg Studios, Copenhagen.

== Charts ==
| Chart (1974) | Peak position |
|---|---|
| Canada Top Albums/CDs (RPM) | 70 |
| Norwegian Albums (VG-lista) | 20 |
| UK Albums (Official Charts) | 35 |
| US Billboard 200 | 94 |

== Release history ==
| Region | Date | Label | Format | Catalog | Comment |
|---|---|---|---|---|---|
| United Kingdom | April 1974 | A&M | stereo LP | AMLH 63607 | |
| United States | February 1974 | A&M | stereo LP | SP 3607 | |
| Canada | 1974 | A&M | LP, 8-track, cassette, CD | SP-3607, 8T-3607, CS-3607, VPCD 3607 | #70 |
| Worldwide | 1998 | A&M | CD | 540 935-2 | Remastered with bonus tracks |
| Japan | 2002 | A&M | CD | UICY-9216 | |

== Sources ==
- Hero and Heroine at strawbsweb.co.uk
- Hero and Heroine: CD 540 935-2 - sleeve notes
