= Hero and Heroine (song) =

Single by Strawbs

from the album Hero and Heroine
- B-side: "Why"
- Released: 1974
- Genre: Progressive rock
- Length: 3:29
- Label: A&M
- Songwriter: Dave Cousins

Strawbs singles chronology
"Shine on Silver Sun" (1973)	"Hero and Heroine" (1974)	"Hold on to Me (The Winter Long)" (1974)

Official audio
- "Hero and Heroine" on YouTube

"Hero and Heroine" is a song by English band Strawbs featured on their 1974 album of the same name. It is written by Dave Cousins. The song is in a similar vein to an earlier track "Witchwood" but with rather more obvious allegory.

Dave Cousins originally demonstrated the song to the band on banjo and the guitar picking under the verses does indeed retain a bluegrass feel. Keyboardist John Hawken and guitarist Dave Lambert added mellotron and guitar power chords between the verses which gives the whole song a more epic bearing.

== B-Side ==
The B-side track "Why" is another Dave Cousins composition, not released on any studio album. It forms the first part of the composite song "Why and Wherefore" which appears on the compilation/rarities album Halcyon Days.

== Personnel ==
- Dave Cousins – vocals, acoustic guitar
- Dave Lambert – electric guitar
- Chas Cronk – bass guitar
- John Hawken – Mellotron, Hammond organ
- Rod Coombes – drums

== Sampling ==
The song was sampled by the producing duo Sid Roams for the beat "Intro/S.R. Anthem", in their album "Strictly Nstrmntl".
