= Rod Coombes =

British musician (born 1946)

- Born: Rodney Coombes; 15 May 1946 (age 80)
- Origin: Notting Hill, London, England
- Genres: Rock; progressive rock; folk rock
- Occupation: Musician
- Instruments: Drums; guitar; vocals
- Years active: 1960s–present
- Label: Various
- Formerly of: The Luvvers (singer Lulu's backing band); Stealers Wheel; Strawbs

Rodney Coombes (born 15 May 1946) is an English musician. He was mostly known from playing drums with British bands Stealers Wheel in 1972 to 1973 and again in 2008 and Strawbs from 1974 to 1977 and again from 2004 to 2010.

== Career ==
Rod is an artist and musician whose first instrument was the guitar, but his father, Roy Coombes, was a drummer/vocalist; so drums became Rod's instrument. He has played drums professionally since he was 17, when he joined singer Lulu's backing band, The Luvvers. After the Luvvers, Rod got a call to join George Bean and The Runners, a soul band with a full horn section. Ironically, George got a call for the band to back Lulu on her radio- and UK tours so it was back to Lulu again. The band also backed Cat Stevens when his single "Matthew And Son" was riding high in the charts. Rod got a call from Rod Stewart to join him and Jeff Beck and Ronnie Wood in the Jeff Beck Band, which was riding high in the charts with the single "Hi Ho Silver Lining". Rod recalls the marquee gig with the band where every face in the London music scene turned up to see Jeff, including the Rolling Stones, some of the Beatles, Eric Clapton, etc. "It was an offer I couldn’t refuse", said Rod, "And it sealed my career path, and of course it was a great privilege playing with Jeff". Rod moved on to the blues rock band Juicy Lucy for two albums, including the single "Who Do You Love", which saw the band on Top Of The Pops twice, unusual for a blues rock band. As Juicy Lucy fell apart Rod got an offer from Gerry Rafferty to join Stealers Wheel for their eponymous first album (which spawned the million seller "Stuck in the Middle With You"). In 1973, they had a global hit with "Stuck in the Middle with You". Gerry didn’t like the idea of touring, and all that flying bothered him. So, he left the band but then tried to break it up. But A&M Records persuaded the band to continue to promote the single and album with Joe Egan taking Gerry's place on vocals. Later, A&M America then persuaded the band to bring Gerry back to tour America, and that led to Gerry's opportunity to break up the band and steal Joe away. Soon after, Rod joined Strawbs, with whom he stayed until after the release of the 1977 album Burning for You.

After spending some time on the studio side, learning to engineer and produce, at Falconer Studios in Chalk Farm, where their first project, the Eurythmics' Sweet Dreams album put the studio firmly on the London map, Rod moved to Malaysia for a period, working as a glass artist, then returning to obtain his master's degree in glass at the University of Wolverhampton. He rejoined The Strawbs in 1998 for their 30th anniversary concert at Chiswick House and played on subsequent tours in the US, Canada, UK, and Europe. Rod also composed and recorded with jazz group Ming Hat and toured the UK. Later, he joined with keyboardist Mark Horwood (The Mummers) and bassist Matt Gray in the fusion group E.V.A. Rod says, "We were too ahead of our time I think, labels didn't get what we were doing and told us were just jamming and there were no singles, ironic because it now sounds like we recorded it yesterday". After being contacted by iTunes and K-tel in California, Tony Williams briefly re-formed Stealers Wheel in Blackpool in 2008 with Rod Coombes and Paul Pilnick, together with close friend Tony Mitchell. On 10 November 2008, they started filming a music video for a re-recording of "Stuck in the Middle" on the Fylde coast. They also began writing new songs, although they had no plans to tour. After Pilnick they decided not to pursue it, although Rod says they still get calls to tour the band because nobody ever really got to see us live, apart from being the opening act for David Bowies' Spiders From Mars tour. Rod got together with Matt Gray from E.V.A., and Rod began writing for their band Project Seven. They played some dates until everyone got too busy to continue. So, Rod decided to compose for his own solo album, titled Hip Joints, recorded at Playroom Studios in West Sussex and co-produced with Mike Sanders. It should be mastered in November 2024, ready for release. Rod said he had spent years working to support others in their music careers, and he felt it was time to show what his real roots are, Jazz and RnB, and to stretch out.

== Discography ==
=== Albums ===
==== Trifle ====
- First Meeting (Dawn DNLS 3017, 1971)

==== Juicy Lucy ====
- Lie Back and Enjoy It (1970)
- Get a Whiff of This (1971)

==== Stealers Wheel ====
- Stealers Wheel (1972)

==== John Entwistle (The Who) ====
- Whistle Rymes (1972)

==== Strawbs ====
- Hero and Heroine (1974)
- Ghosts (1974)
- Nomadness (1975)
- Deep Cuts (1976)
- Burning for You (1977)
- Blue Angel (2003)
- Déjà Fou (2004)
- The Broken Hearted Bride (2008)
- Dancing to the Devil's Beat (2009)

==== Ming Hat ====
- Jam-ming (jazz) Gash Recordings 2002

=== Singles ===
Unless otherwise stated, the details are of the singles released in the UK.

==== Jeff Beck ====
- "Hi Ho Silver Lining" (1967)

==== Trifle ====
- "All Together Now" / "Got My Thing" (United Artists UA 2270, 1969)
- "Old Fashioned Prayer Meeting" / "Dirty Old Town" (Dawn DNS 1008, 1970)

==== Stealers Wheel ====
- "Stuck in the Middle with You" (1972)

==== Strawbs ====
- "Shine on Silver Sun"/"And Wherefore" (1973)
- "Hero and Heroine"/"Why" (1974)
- "Hold on to Me (The Winter Long)"/"Where do You Go" (1974)
- "Round and Round"/"Heroine's Theme" (1974) (US and Italy only)
- "Grace Darling"/"Changes Arranges" (1974)
- "Angel Wine"/"Grace Darling" (1975) (Japan only)
- "Lemon Pie"/"Don't Try to Change Me" (1975)
- "Little Sleepy" (1975) (US and Portugal only)
- "I Only Want My Love to Grow in You"/"Wasting My Time (Thinking of You)" (1976)
- "So Close and Yet So Far Away"/"The Soldier's Tale" (1976) (US only)
- "Charmer"/"Beside the Rio Grande" (1976)
- "Back in the Old Routine"/"Burning for You" (1977)
- "Keep on Trying"/"Simple Visions" (1977)
- "Heartbreaker" (1977) (US and South Africa only)
- "Joey and Me"/"Deadly Nightshade" (1978)
- "New Beginnings"/"Words of Wisdom" (1978)
- "I Don't Want to Talk About It"/"The Last Resort" (1978) (US only)
