= Chas Cronk =

British musician

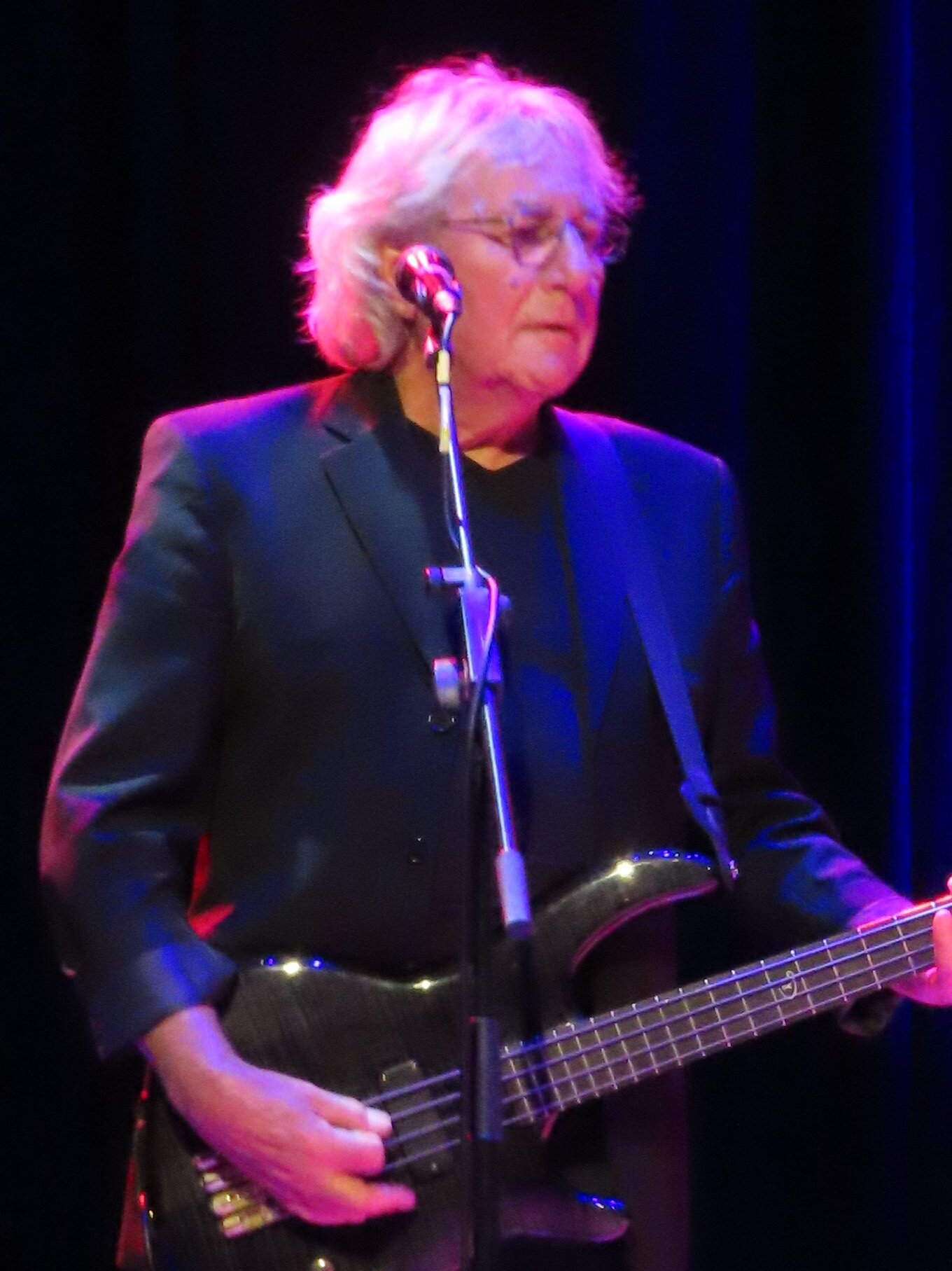
- Cronk in 2024

Background information
- Born: Charles Cronk
- Genres: Progressive rock, art rock, folk rock
- Occupation: Musician
- Instruments: Bass; guitar
- Years active: 1960s–present
- Member of: Strawbs
- Formerly of: Steve Hackett Band; Cry No More
- Website: chascronk.com

Chas Cronk is an English musician, best known as the bass player and acoustic guitarist for the Strawbs from 1973 to 1980 and again from 2004 to 2023.

Cronk also toured and recorded with Steve Hackett and Rick Wakeman in the 1980s and Cry No More in the 1980s and 1990s. He released a solo album, Liberty, in March 2022 on Renaissance Records (USA). He is currently playing bass with the Colin Blunstone Band having started in April 2024.

== Discography ==
=== Albums ===
==== Phillip Goodhand-Tait band ====
- Songfall (1972)

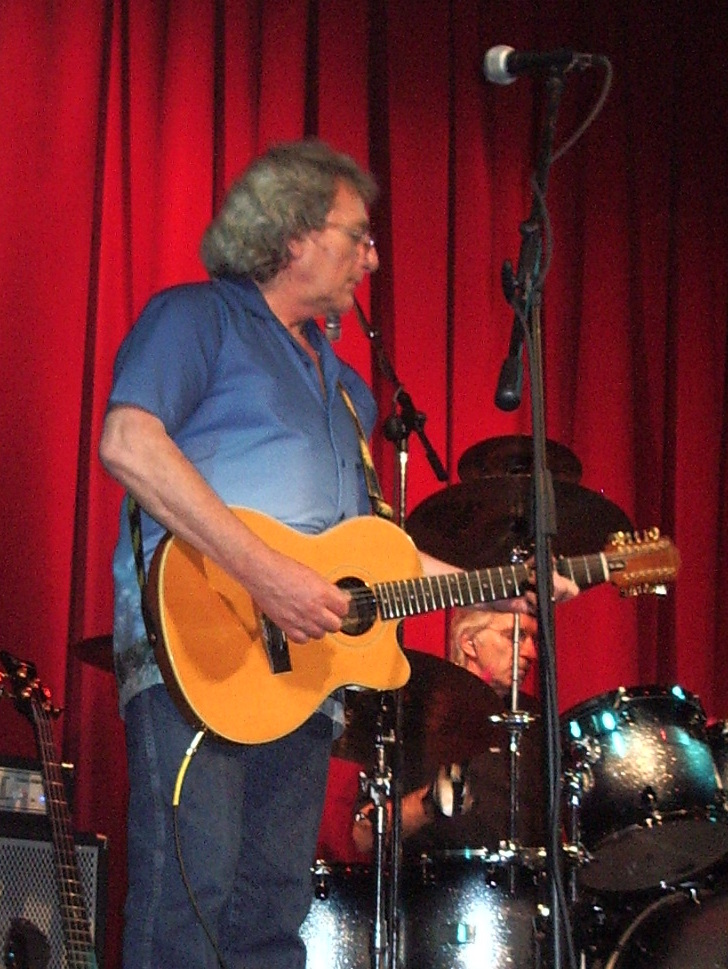
Cronk in 2008

==== Strawbs ====
- Hero and Heroine (1974)
- Ghosts (1974)
- Nomadness (1975)
- Deep Cuts (1976)
- Burning for You (1977)
- Deadlines (1978)
- Heartbreak Hill (1978)
- Blue Angel (2003)
- Déjà Fou (2004)
- Strawbs Live at Nearfest 2004 (2005)
- A Taste of Strawbs (2006) (box with 4 CDs, recordings 1967–2006)
- Strawbs NY '75 (2007) (live recording of a 1975 show)
- Lay Down with the Strawbs (2008) (double CD recorded live at The Robin in Bilston 5 March 2006)
- The Broken Hearted Bride (2008) (with the Hero and Heroine line-up)
- Dancing to the Devil's Beat (2009)
- Strawbs 40th Anniversary Celebration Vol. 1: Strawberry Fayre (2010)

==== Acoustic Strawbs ====
- Painted Sky (2005) (Acoustic Strawbs live)
- Acoustic Gold (2011)

==== Rick Wakeman ====
- The Six Wives of Henry VIII (1973)
- Crimes of Passion soundtrack (1984)
- Glory Boys (1984)
- Live at Hammersmith (1985)
- Wakeman & Cousins – Hummingbird (2002)

==== Cry No More ====
- Smile (1986)
- Cry No More (1987)
- Love and Power (1989) (produced by Andy Richards)
- Strawbs 40th Anniversary Celebration Vol. 1: Strawberry Fayre (2010)

==== Solo ====
- Mystic Mountain Music (2002)
- Liberty [LP] (2022) (Renaissance Records)

==== Lambert Cronk ====
- Touch the Earth (2007)

==== Steve Hackett ====
- Time Lapse (2001)
- Live Archive 70/80/90s (2001)
- Defector: Deluxe Edition (2016 remaster – Disc 2 1981 Live at Reading Festival)

==== Colin Blunstone ====
- One Year And More Live from Union Chapel (2026) CD & DVD

=== Singles ===
Unless otherwise stated, the details are of the singles released in the UK.

==== Strawbs ====
- "Shine on Silver Sun"/"And Wherefore" (1973)
- "Hero and Heroine"/"Why" (1974)
- "Hold on to Me (The Winter Long)"/"Where do You Go" (1974)
- "Round and Round"/"Heroine's Theme" (1974) (US and Italy only)
- "Grace Darling"/"Changes Arrange Us" (1974)
- "Angel Wine"/"Grace Darling" (1975) (Japan only)
- "Lemon Pie"/"Don't Try to Change Me" (1975)
- "Little Sleepy" (1975) (US and Portugal only)
- "I Only Want My Love to Grow in You"/"Wasting My Time (Thinking of You)" (1976)
- "So Close and Yet So Far Away"/"The Soldier's Tale" (1976) (US only)
- "Charmer"/"Beside the Rio Grande" (1976)
- "Back in the Old Routine"/"Burning for You" (1977)
- "Keep on Trying"/"Simple Visions" (1977)
- "Heartbreaker" (1977) (US and South Africa only)
- "Joey and Me"/"Deadly Nightshade" (1978)
- "New Beginnings"/"Words of Wisdom" (1978)
- "I Don't Want to Talk About It"/"The Last Resort" (1978) (US only)

=== DVDs ===
==== Strawbs ====
- Complete Strawbs: The Chiswick House Concert (2002)
- Strawbs Live in Tokyo DVD, plus Grave New World, the movie (2003)
