= John Hawken =

British keyboardist (1940–2024)

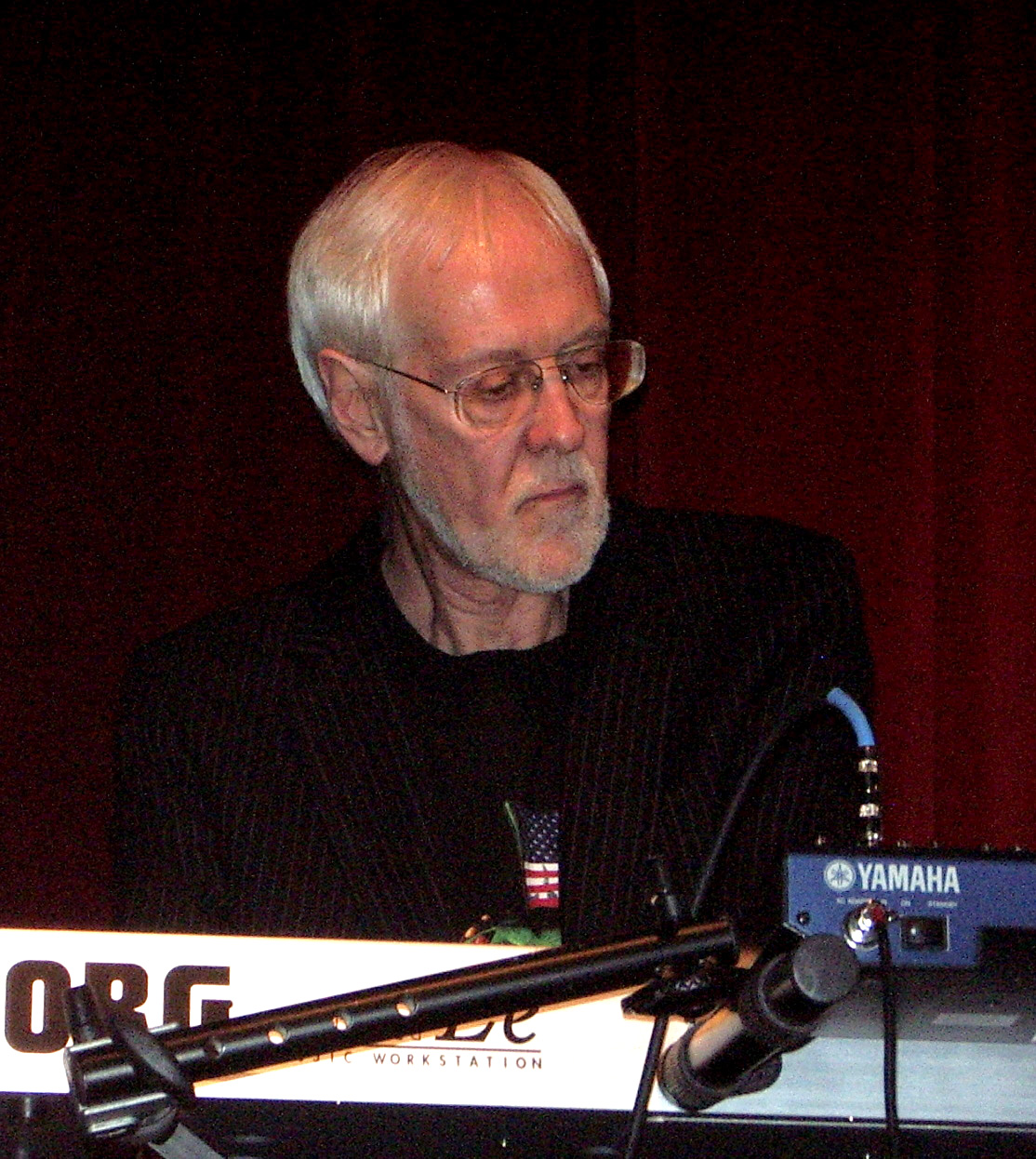
- John Hawken in 2008

Background information
- Born: John Christopher Hawken; 9 May 1940; Bournemouth, England
- Died: 15 May 2024 (aged 84) Metuchen, New Jersey, U.S.
- Education: Cheadle Hulme School
- Genres: Rhythm and blues; rock; progressive rock
- Occupation: Musician
- Instrument: Keyboards
- Years active: 1960–2008, 2011, 2019
- Formerly of: The Nashville Teens; Spooky Tooth; Third World War; Strawbs; Vinegar Joe; Renaissance; Illusion

John Christopher Hawken (9 May 1940 – 15 May 2024) was an English keyboard player, best known as a member of The Nashville Teens, Renaissance, and the Strawbs. He also played in Spooky Tooth, Third World War, Vinegar Joe and Illusion, as well as being a session musician.

== Biography ==
Hawken was born 9 May 1940 in Bournemouth, England. He trained in classical piano from the age of 5 until 18, prompted by his mother Dorothy Constance Hawken, who was formally trained as both a pianist and painter from an early age. He was educated at Cheadle Hulme School. He took an interest in rock and roll and, in 1960, joined his first rock band – the Cruisers Rock Combo. The band included future Renaissance guitarist Michael Dunford.

=== Nashville Teens ===
In 1962, The Cruisers Rock Combo were joined by singers Ray Phillips and Arthur Sharp to form The Nashville Teens. John Allen soon joined on lead guitar after Dunford's departure, and Terry Crowe joined as a third singer. This line-up turned professional in 1963 and went to Germany to play in the clubs (including Hamburg's Star-Club).

In 1964 (now minus Terry Crowe and with Barry Jenkins on drums) The Nashville Teens signed a management contract and recorded "Tobacco Road", at the same time touring with Chuck Berry and Carl Perkins on their first tour of England. "I was delighted to be playing piano for both of them, in addition to playing the Nashville Teens set", said Hawken. The band went to the US in late 1964 to play the "Murray the K" Christmas show at the Fox Theater in Brooklyn and subsequently toured extensively in England and Europe.

Peter Harris left the group in 1966 and was replaced on bass by Neil Korner, formerly of The New Vaudeville Band. Neil and John Hawken also worked together from time to time in a popular London pick-up band, Frankie Reid & The Powerhouse, which also featured Dana Gillespie on vocals and occasionally, the saxophone section from Cliff Bennett's Rebel Rousers, plus John Knightsbridge on guitar (later of Illusion).

Although subsequent records failed to equal the success of "Tobacco Road", the band worked steadily until Hawken moved on late in 1968.

=== Renaissance ===
In late 1968 former Yardbird Chris Dreja, John Hawken and pedal steel guitarist Brian (B.J.) Cole were going to form a country-rock band, to be managed by Peter Grant and produced by Mickie Most, but they never got beyond the rehearsal stage. Dreja, aware that his former Yardbirds colleagues Jim McCarty and Keith Relf were putting together a new band, suggested Hawken as a possible member. In early 1969 Hawken got a telephone call from McCarty asking if he was interested in the new project. Hawken turned up at McCarty's house in Thames Ditton, along with bass player Louis Cennamo, Dreja and Cole. Cole and Dreja subsequently dropped out of the project.

A short time later Jane Relf joined on vocals and Renaissance was born, with a line-up of Keith and Jane Relf, McCarty, Hawken and Cennamo. The band's self-titled debut album was released in October 1969, followed by an American tour in early 1970. During the recording of the band's second album, Keith Relf, McCarty, and Cennamo departed. Hawken formed a new lineup of the band with former Nashville Teens members Terry Crowe, Michael Dunford, and Neil Korner, as well as session drummer Terry Slade. After a European tour, Jane Relf left to be replaced by American singer Binky Cullom.

Hawken was contacted by Spooky Tooth (an English rock band) in October 1970 with an offer to join the band. Hawken accepted, helping his successor in Renaissance, John Tout, to integrate with the band before leaving.

=== After Renaissance ===
Hawken joined Spooky Tooth for a three-month European tour in support of their album The Last Puff. After the tour was complete, Spooky Tooth disbanded.

In 1971, Hawken joined Third World War, with whom he recorded one album (the band's second release). The group also included John Knightsbridge on lead guitar, who would later join Hawken in Illusion.

Hawken also worked as a session musician, playing on Spooky Tooth bandmate Luther Grosvenor's solo album, as well as projects by Claire Hamill and The Sutherland Brothers.

=== Strawbs ===
After a brief spell with Vinegar Joe, whom he left in September 1972, Hawken joined the Strawbs in 1973. At his audition, Dave Cousins introduced Hawken to the mellotron. During Hawken's tenure with the band they released two albums, Hero and Heroine and Ghosts. Tours included the US, Japan and Europe. In late 1975, Hawken left the band after disagreements over the more commercial direction that the other members wanted to go in.

Hawken appeared briefly in the David Essex film That'll Be the Day (1973) as the keyboard player in the band led by Stormy Tempest (Billy Fury), which also featured Keith Moon on drums.

=== Illusion ===
In 1976, Hawken and the other original Renaissance members began to work on a reunion. After Keith Relf's death, the band was re-shuffled, bringing in John Knightsbridge on lead guitar and Eddie McNeill on drums, with McCarty sharing vocals with Jane Relf and also playing rhythm guitar. Unable, for legal reasons, to use the name Renaissance, they chose "Illusion" – which had been the title of their second album as Renaissance. The group recorded two albums, Out of the Mist and Illusion, before disbanding in 1979. In 1990, a further album of unreleased material was released under the name Enchanted Caress.

=== Move to the United States ===
On 29 October 1979, John, his wife Alexandra and their sons Barnaby and Jody moved to the United States from the UK, and Hawken went into a temporary retirement from music.

In 2001, the surviving members of the original Renaissance – Jim McCarty, Jane Relf, Louis Cennamo and John Hawken – recorded and released the album Through the Fire under the band name 'Renaissance Illusion'.

In 2004 the Hero and Heroine Strawbs line-up reunited, and undertook a number of tours both in the US and Europe, recording two new albums: Deja Fou and The Broken Hearted Bride.

On 26 June 2008, Hawken announced his retirement from touring.

In October 2011, Hawken came out of retirement to perform with Jim McCarty and Jann Klose at Hugh's Room and This Ain't Hollywood, Ontario, for two Chamber Pop Summits. In 2019, he joined the Strawbs for their 50th anniversary show.

Hawken died from melanoma at his home in Metuchen, New Jersey, on 15 May 2024, six days after his 84th birthday.

== Discography ==
=== The Nashville Teens ===
- 1964: Tobacco Road

=== Renaissance ===
- 1969: Renaissance
- 1971: Illusion

=== Third World War ===
- 1972: Third World War II

=== Strawbs ===
- 1974: Hero and Heroine
- 1975: Ghosts
- 1995: Strawbs in Concert
- 2004: Déjà Fou
- 2005: Live at Nearfest
- 2008: Lay Down with the Strawbs
- 2008: The Broken Hearted Bride
- 2020: Live in Concert

=== Illusion ===
- 1977: Out of the Mist
- 1978: Illusion
- 1990: Enchanted Caress (recorded in 1979, released in 1990)
- 2001: Through the Fire (under the name "Renaissance Illusion")

=== Collaborations ===
- 1971: Luther Grosvenor – Under Open Skies
- 1971: Claire Hamill – One House Left Standing
- 1972: The Sutherland Brothers – Lifeboat
- 2007: The Smithereens – Meet the Smithereens!
- 2018: Jim McCarty – Walking in the Wild Land
