= Strawbs =

English rock band (1963–2023)

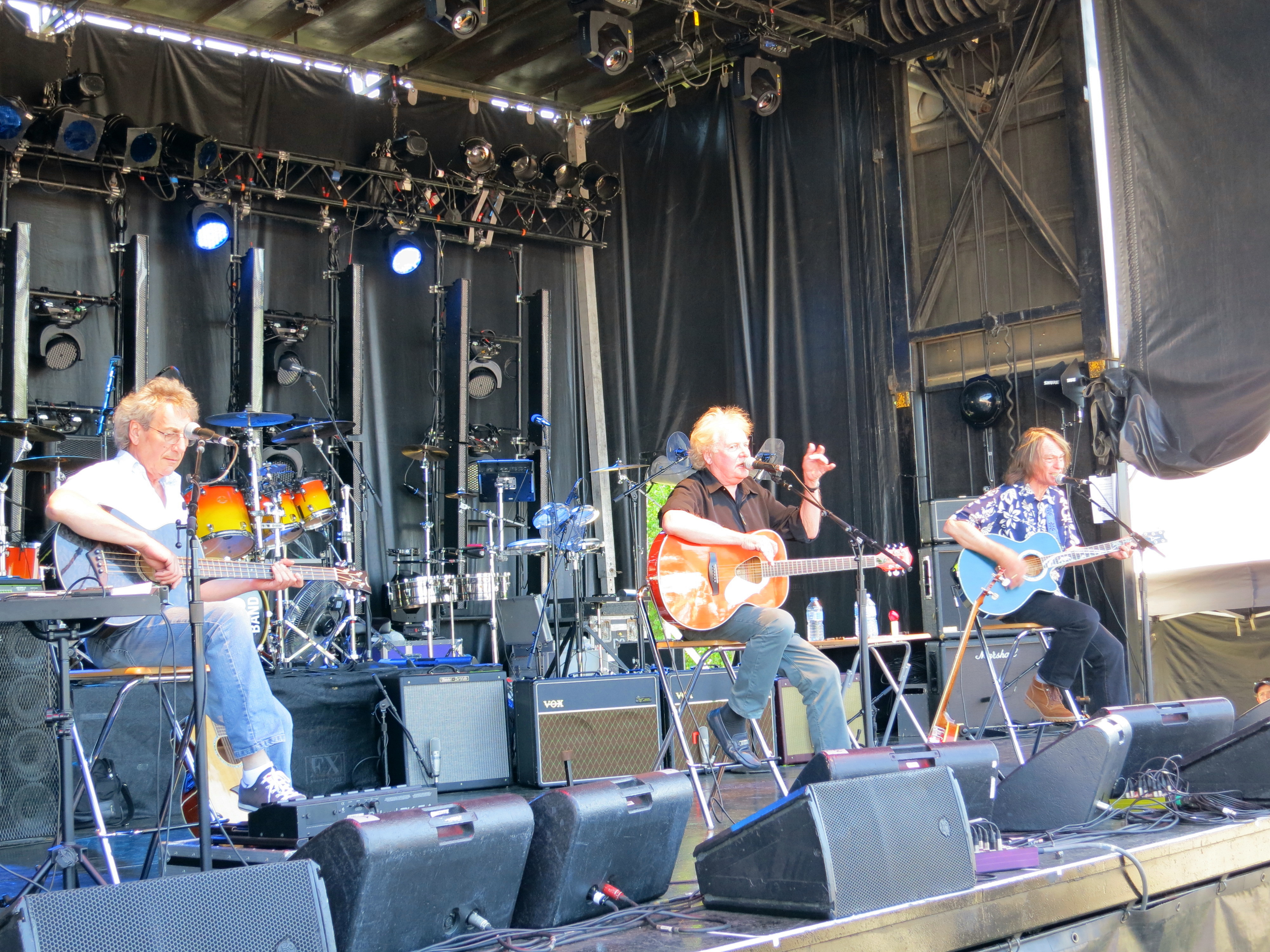
- Strawbs performing in 2012

Background information
- Also known as: The Strawbs; Acoustic Strawbs
- Origin: Strawberry Hill, London, England
- Genres: Folk rock; progressive rock; bluegrass
- Years active: 1963–1980, 1983–2023
- Labels: A&M; Virgin; EMI; Witchwood Media
- Past members: Dave Cousins; Rick Wakeman; Dave Lambert; Chas Cronk; Tony Fernandez; Dave Bainbridge
- Website: strawbsweb.co.uk

The Strawbs were an English rock band formed in London in 1963 by Dave Cousins (vocals, guitar, banjo, mandolin, dulcimer) and Tony Hooper (vocals, guitar). Over 25 musicians have been members across its history, with Cousins being the leader, principal songwriter, and longest serving member of the band. Other notable members were Ron Chesterman, Rick Wakeman, Richard Hudson, John Ford, Blue Weaver, Dave Lambert, Chas Cronk, and Rod Coombes.

The group started out as a bluegrass duo called the Strawberry Hill Boys, but recruited additional members and evolved towards folk and electronic rock. In 1968, after a period recording with vocalist Sandy Denny, the group were the first act to sign with American label A&M Records. They had initial UK chart success as a five-piece with their third release, the live album Just a Collection of Antiques and Curios (1970). The Strawbs adopted a progressive rock-oriented direction for the rest of the decade and reached their commercial peak with Grave New World (1972) and Bursting at the Seams (1972), of which the latter featured "Part of the Union" and "Lay Down" which reached No. 2 and No. 12 in the UK, respectively. Following Hero and Heroine (1974) and Ghosts (1975) and continued touring, mostly in the US and Canada, the group split 1980.

Cousins began a parallel career in the UK radio industry, but revived the Strawbs in 1983 and the band performed and recorded albums in various capacities and line-ups over the next four decades. Their final concert took place at the Fairport's Cropredy Convention in August 2023, after which Cousins retired due to ongoing health problems. He died in July 2025 at the age of 85, thus ending the band.

== History ==
=== 1963–1968: Early period ===
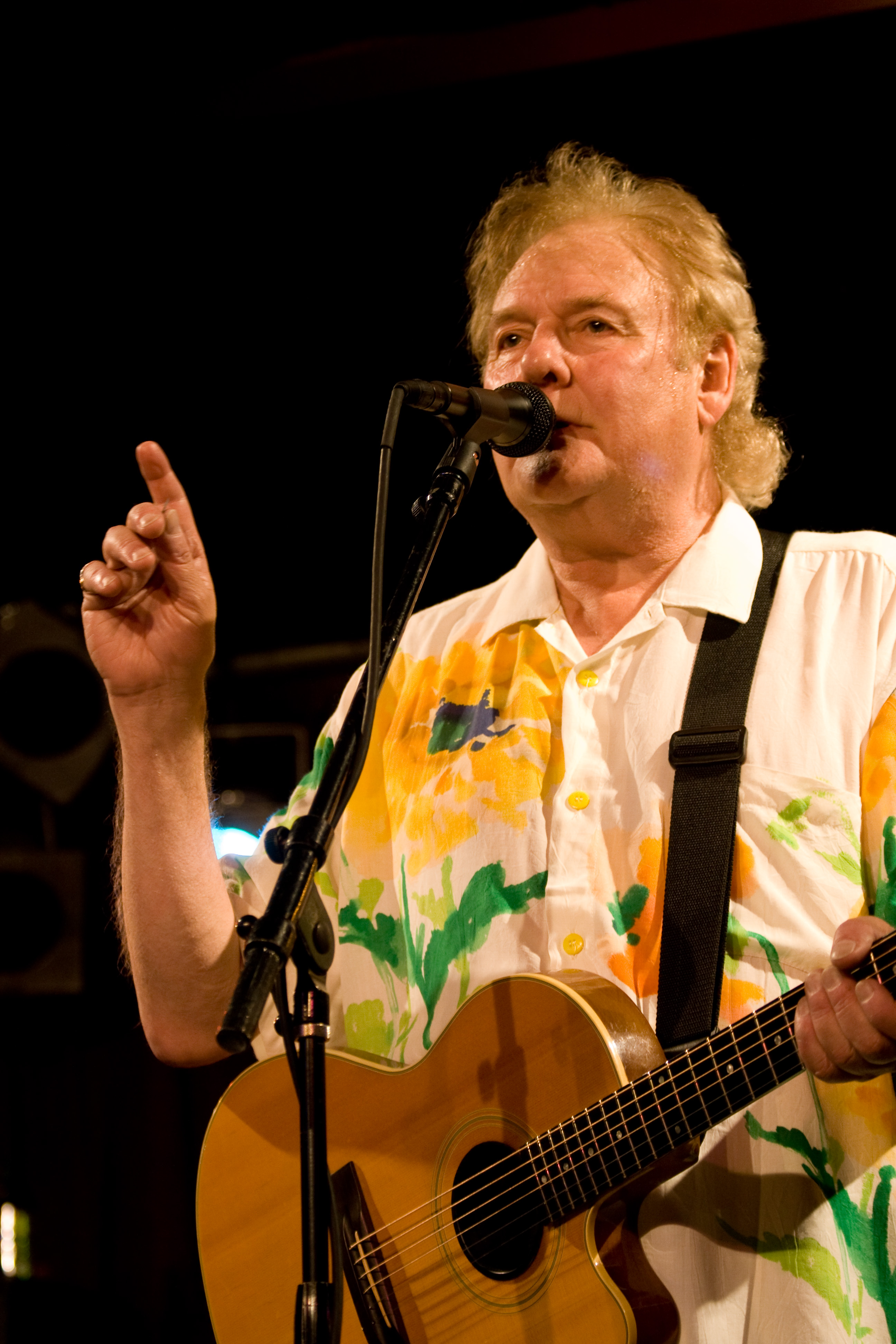
Dave Cousins, founder member and leader of the band

The band formed as the Strawberry Hill Boys in early 1963 by Dave Cousins and Tony Hooper. Cousins had met Hooper on his first day at Thames Valley Grammar in Twickenham, and the two shared musical interests, being fans of the Foggy Mountain Boys and Earl Taylor and the Stoney Mountain Boys. This, in addition to them rehearsing in the flat of Susie Shahn, daughter of American painter Ben Shahn, in Strawberry Hill, London in south west London, led to the duo naming themselves in a similar fashion. They started out as a bluegrass group with sets formed of Flatt and Scruggs and The Stanley Brothers covers with Cousins on vocals, guitar, dulcimer and banjo, and Hooper on vocals and guitar. Eventually Cousins began writing his own songs, becoming the principal songwriter and leader of the band.

Their first gig took place at a folk club in Clapham. Soon after Cousins and Hooper successfully auditioned for a live BBC radio session in Maida Vale that was broadcast in April 1963. Their pass allowed them to secure further radio work, including a spot in June on Saturday Club which featured the Beatles. In the following month, the group supported the Rolling Stones for several gigs at the Eel Pie Island jazz club where Cousins worked as a cloakroom attendant. During this early period Arthur Phillips joined the band playing mandolin and "Talking" John Berry on double bass, but the group settled in 1966 as a trio of Cousins, Hooper, and newcomer Ron Chesterman. In June 1967, the band shortened their name to the Strawbs for a concert in which they wanted to display the name on stage. Their musical direction evolved around this time, moving from bluegrass towards folk and pop.

In mid-1967, the Strawbs recruited vocalist Sandy Denny after Cousins had spotted her performing at the Troubadour in Earl's Court. The four recorded several demos which caught the attention of Danish label Sonet Records, after Cousins had given a copy to a friend who was a DJ in Denmark. They accepted an invitation to record an album for the label in Copenhagen, which took place in July 1967 with producer Gustav Winckler. The result was All Our Own Work, consisting mostly of Cousins' material with Denny contributing the song "Who Knows Where the Time Goes?". The band failed to attract interest from labels for a UK release, and Denny parted ways to join Fairport Convention.

=== 1968–1971: Signing with A&M and rise ===
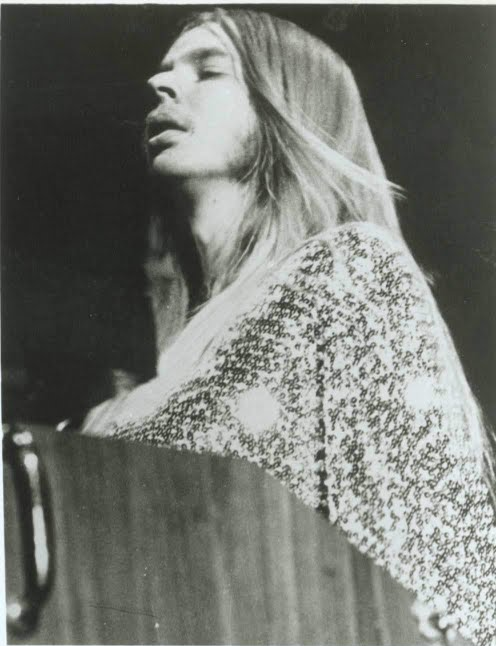
Rick Wakeman, keyboardist from 1970 to 1971, gained national attention for his playing in the band

In 1968, Horizon Records owner Dave Hubert took the album to an enthusiastic Herb Alpert and Jerry Moss, co-founders of American label A&M Records. They signed the band to a five-year deal in June, their first British group on the label. Cousins recalled the confusion from management who thought they were an American act. The group's debut single, "Oh How She Changed" with "Or Am I Dreaming" on the B-side, was released in June 1968. This was followed by "The Man Who Called Himself Jesus" in November, featuring a spoken introduction by actor Richard Wilson. It was produced by Gus Dudgeon and Tony Visconti, who reprised their roles on the band's debut studio album Strawbs, released in May 1969. It features Nicky Hopkins on piano, John Paul Jones of Led Zeppelin fame on bass, and a string section. A&M had sent the band $15,000 to help with production costs, only to find after recording that the sum was in fact to cover three albums. Later in 1969, A&M released the sampler record Strawberry Sampler Number 1.

Dragonfly was recorded in Copenhagen and London with Visconti returning as producer. Released in February 1970, the new material featured parts from Visconti on recorder, Paul Brett on guitar, Bjarne Rostvold on drums, and Rick Wakeman on piano. Wakeman was already a noted session musician in London having worked for Dudgeon and Visconti, and also played in a pub band in East London. In the following month Cousins recruited Wakeman as a full time keyboardist, in time for a series of appearances at a rock circus in Paris. Following the departure of Chesterman around this time, Cousins and Hooper recruited Richard Hudson on drums and John Ford on bass. The new five-piece had their London debut at the Queen Elizabeth Hall on 11 July 1970 which was recorded as their third album, Just a Collection of Antiques and Curios. Melody Maker reported on the successful concert with the headline "Tomorrow's superstar" in reference to Wakeman and his virtuosity on piano and organ. Wakeman stayed with them for one further album, From the Witchwood, then departed to join Yes. Wakeman spoke about the split: "We were beginning to compromise a lot on ideas ... and I don't think it was helping what was eventually coming out. We ended up lacking challenge. Complacency set in, and for the last couple of months we just weren't working."

=== 1971–1973: Commercial peak ===
Wakeman was replaced by Welsh keyboardist Blue Weaver, formerly of Amen Corner and Fair Weather, following a chance meeting with Cousins. He enjoyed the creative freedom the group presented him and contributed to the songwriting. This line-up recorded Grave New World in late 1971 which marked the band distancing themselves further from their folk roots towards progressive rock. Cousins wrote "Benedictus", the opening track, about Wakeman's departure after Visconti had introduced Cousins to the Chinese text I Ching as he thought about the future of the band.

Strawbs co-founder Hooper departed after touring Grave New World, as the band had far outgrown his original vision for it and wanted to pursue production work. He was replaced by electric guitarist Dave Lambert, who had jammed with the band at their appearance at the Cambridge Folk Festival that summer. His arrival coincided with a move towards a harder rock style on the next album, Bursting at the Seams. The first single, "Lay Down", went to No. 12 in the UK in late 1972 and became their first hit. The second single, "Part of the Union" was put out as the second in January 1973 and fared even better, reaching No. 2. The band promoted the single with an appearance on Top of the Pops, propelling them to a wider audience. The album, also released in January 1973, went to No. 2 and remains the band's best performance on the UK album chart. Despite the harder rock direction being far removed from the band's acoustic folk origins, Cousins said in 1974 that "The River" and "Down by the Sea" were "the most sincere songs that I've ever written".

During the band's 1973 North American tour, their manager informed Cousins that the rest of the group wanted him to leave. It led to what Cousins described as a "bloodbath" and resulted in Hudson and Ford departing at its conclusion. Cousins said the spat was over the group's musical direction, with Hudson and Ford wanting to pursue hit singles while Cousins was in favour of expansive arrangements. The pair formed Hudson Ford, followed by The Monks and High Society.

=== 1973–1980: Progressive rock period and disbanding ===
Cousins and Lambert quickly rebuilt the band, recruiting Renaissance keyboardist John Hawken, Stealers Wheel drummer Rod Coombes, and Chas Cronk on bass. Hawken was reluctant to play any instrument except the piano at first, but soon took to the Mellotron and Moog synthesizer which expanded the group's sound into progressive rock. Their first single, "Shine on Silver Sun", was released in August 1973 to introduce the new line-up to the public. It went to No. 34 in the UK, and was promoted with an appearance on Top of the Pops. Later that year they recorded Hero and Heroine in Copenhagen, featuring material that Cousins had written on the previous US tour which was a productive period for him. Released in March 1974, the album went to No. 35 in the UK. Rolling Stone reporter Ken Barnes wrote: "Strawbs moved from folkier days to a lush, stately and mellotron-dominated sound, with similarities to Yes, King Crimson and the Moody Blues. They wrote more compelling songs than the former two, and possessed more lyrical/musical substance than the latter."

The follow-up, Ghosts, and tended to concentrate on the North American market with relatively little touring in the UK. Nomadness, recorded without Hawken, was less successful, and was their last for A&M Records.

Signed to the Deep Purple–owned Oyster label, they recorded two more albums with two keyboardists replacing Hawken – Robert Kirby, also known for his string arrangements (notably Nick Drake) and John Mealing of jazz-rock group If. Coombes was replaced by Tony Fernandez (known for working on Rick Wakeman's solo albums) for a further album, Deadlines, this time on the Arista label. Although recording was complete on a further album, Heartbreak Hill, featuring Andy Richards on keyboards, Cousins' decision in 1980 to leave the band to work in radio effectively signalled the band's demise, and the album remained in the vaults for many years.

=== 1983–2006 ===
The Strawbs reunited in early 1983 for a performance of "The Hangman and the Papist" on Wakeman's television show GasTank, which led the band to headline the Cambridge Folk Festival that year. The Grave New World line-up plus Brian Willoughby (who had replaced Lambert when he left in 1978 during the making of Heartbreak Hill, and had also begun a partnership with Cousins as an acoustic duo from 1979 onwards) went on from there to perform occasionally in the UK, the US and Europe over the next few years, replacing Weaver with Chris Parren from Hudson Ford and Ford himself with bassist Rod Demick.

1993 saw the band touring in the UK for their 25th anniversary, but the next few years saw little activity. In the summer of 1998 Cousins staged a 30th-anniversary event in Chiswick Park in London, which saw several different line-ups of the band perform. The final of these – the Bursting at the Seams line-up plus Willoughby – became the ongoing version of the band, with annual tours in subsequent years.

=== Acoustic Strawbs ===
An injury to Cousins' wrist coinciding with a Cousins & Willoughby commitment brought Dave Lambert in to work with Cousins & Willoughby, which soon became Acoustic Strawbs, recording an album, Baroque & Roll, in 2001. That trio began to tour on a regular basis – first in the UK, then the US and Canada, and on into Europe, the three guitars of Acoustic Strawbs effortlessly reproducing much of the majesty and depth of the "big" Strawbs keyboard-laden instrumentation.

Willoughby was replaced by Chas Cronk when Willoughby left in 2004 to spend more time working with his partner, Cathryn Craig. Cronk has brought bass and bass pedals, which further add to the depth of the Acoustic Strawbs sound. 2004 also saw the return of the Hero And Heroine line-up of the electric band, touring in tandem with the acoustic line-up, and recording their first new album for 25 years, Deja Fou, on the Strawbs' own label, Witchwood Records.

=== 2006–2023 ===
Since 2006, the Strawbs have been recording and touring in two formats: the acoustic format with Cousins, Lambert and Cronk; and the entirely original Hero and Heroine/Ghosts line-up of the electric band from 1974: Cousins, Lambert, Cronk, Coombes and Hawken. The line-up undertook two tours in 2006.

For that particular recording, and other concerts on the same tour, John Ford flew from New York to perform the line-up. The Hero and Heroine line-up toured again in 2007 in the UK, including gigs at the Robin 2 (Bilston), The Stables (Wavendon), and several locations in Southern and Southwestern England. This line-up also toured the UK and US in May–June 2008. Following the US tour, Hawken announced his intention to leave the group. The remaining four members (the Nomadness line-up) continued as the core of the electric band. In January 2009, it was announced that Oliver Wakeman would be playing keyboards with the band on tours of Canada, the UK and Italy.

In 2006, the Strawbs released a four-disc boxed set called A Taste of Strawbs. The Hero and Heroine/Ghosts line-up recorded a new studio album, The Broken Hearted Bride, released in September 2008.

The Strawbs' website announced that neither Rod Coombes nor Oliver Wakeman were available for the October/November 2010 tours of Canada and the UK. (Coombes has educational commitments, and Wakeman was committed to recording a new Yes album.) For these tours, Tony Fernandez (who played with Strawbs on Deadlines and Heartbreak Hill) was employed on drums, and John Young on keyboards.

The November 2012 tour featured a line-up of Cousins, Lambert, Cronk, Adam Wakeman and Adam Falkner. In February 2014 the band gigged with a line-up of Cousins, Lambert, Cronk, Wakeman and Fernandez. Their album Prognostic was issued in October 2014. In 2015, a UK tour with the electricl band was postponed after Cousins required surgery after an accidental fall dislodged a kidney stone. The tour was rescheduled for 2016, featuring a mix of acoustic and electric band performances in the UK and the US.

In 2017, the band released The Ferryman's Curse featuring a line-up of Cousins, Lambert, Cronk, Fernandez and newcomer Dave Bainbridge on keyboards and guitar. It was their first studio album of new material in eight years, and the title track is a sequel to what happened to the boatman on "The Vision of the Lady of the Lake" from Dragonfly. The album took several years to complete due to bouts of ill-health from Cousins, who at one point recorded his vocals while in pain with a hernia. As a result he reduced his workload by folding Witchwood Records and signed with Esoteric Records to handle more of the group's business affairs.

The band toured the US in 2019 as part of their 50th-anniversary celebration. The tour included a three-day event in Lakewood, New Jersey, featuring former members along with special guests/friends appearing (Annie Haslam, Larry Fast, Tony Visconti, Wesley Stace, and others).

Settlement was released in 2021 and according to Cousins, was disliked by the rest of the group. He replaced drum parts that Fernandez had put down without his knowledge, which Cousins thought was necessary to improve the songs. Fernandez refused to have his name put on the album as a result. Tensions increased in 2022 during the making of what became their final studio album, The Magic Of It All, released in July 2023. Recording took place in Cape Town, South Africa in 2022, after Cousins had travelled there and played several gigs to help cover the costs of the trip. He met filmmaker Niel van Deventer, who pitched the idea of a documentary on the Strawbs and filming the band record a new studio album. Cousins agreed, and brought in Weaver and Ford to play on it amongst a group of South African session musicians. He had asked Cronk and Lambert to record parts, but upon hearing them he recalled: "I'd heard it all before, so when the opportunity arose to record with different people, I jumped at it."

In May 2023, after completing the album, Cousins addressed claims that he had dumped Cronk, Lambert, Fernandez, and Bainbridge, noting that none had been invited to perform at the band's final concert at Fairport's Cropredy Convention on 11 August. He stated that he had not "excluded" them and that Fernandez had ceased to be a member in 2020 after recording Settlement, that Cronk and Lambert had declined their invitation to perform at the show, and that Bainbridge, now a US resident, was unable to obtain his green card in time to travel and rehearse. The show featured a line-up of Cousins, Weaver, Ford, Willoughby, Mauritz Lotz, Cathryn Craig, Schalk Joubert, Kevin Gibson, and a guest appearance from Adam Wakeman.

Cousins died at the Pilgrims Hospice in Canterbury, on 13 July 2025, at the age of 85.

== Band members ==
=== Official members ===
- David Cousins – vocals, guitars, mandolin, dulcimer, banjo (died 2025)
- Tony Hooper – guitar, vocals (died 2020)
- Ron Chesterman – double bass (died 2007)
- Sandy Denny – vocals, guitar (died 1978)
- Rick Wakeman – piano, Hammond organ, harpsichord, clavinet, mellotron
- Lindsay L. Cooper – cello, double bass (died 2001)
- Clare Deniz – cello
- Dave Lambert – lead guitar, acoustic guitar, vocals (1972–1978, 1999–2001, 2004–2021)
- John Ford – bass guitar, acoustic guitar, vocals
- Blue Weaver – keyboards, Accordion
- Richard Hudson – Drums, sitar, vocals
- Chas Cronk – bass, guitar, vocals (1973–1980, 2004–2021)
- John Hawken – keyboards (died 2024)
- Rod Coombes – drums, guitar, vocals
- Robert Kirby – keyboards, acoustic guitar, string arrangements
- John Mealing – organ, electric piano, piano, synthesizers
- Rupert Holmes – harpsichord, piano, clavinet
- Tony Fernandez – drums, percussion (1977–1980, 2010–2012, 2014–2021)
- Miller Anderson – guitars, vocals
- Brian Willoughby – guitars, vocals
- Chris Parren – keyboards
- Rod Demick – bass, vocals
- Andy Richards – keyboards
- Adam Wakeman – keyboards
- Oliver Wakeman – keyboards
- John Young – keyboards
- Joe Partridge – lead guitar
- Dave Bainbridge – keyboards, programming, guitar, bouzouki (2015–2021)

=== Acoustic Strawbs ===
- Dave Lambert – acoustic guitar, vocals (2000–present)
- Chas Cronk – bass, acoustic guitar, vocals (2004–present)
- Brian Willoughby – acoustic guitar (2000–2004)
- Dave Cousins – vocals, acoustic guitar, banjo, dulcimer (2000–2025)

== Discography ==
Studio albums

- Strawbs (1969)
- Dragonfly (1970)
- Just a Collection of Antiques and Curios (1970, live and studio)
- From the Witchwood (1971)
- Grave New World (1972)
- Bursting at the Seams (1973)
- All Our Own Work (1973; recorded 1967) - With Sandy Denny
- Hero and Heroine (1974)
- Ghosts (1975)
- Nomadness (1975)
- Deep Cuts (1976)
- Burning for You (1977)
- Deadlines (1978)
- Don't Say Goodbye (1987)
- Ringing Down the Years (1991)
- Heartbreak Hill (1995)
- Baroque & Roll (2001)
- Blue Angel (2003)
- Déjà Fou (2004)
- The Broken Hearted Bride (2008)
- Dancing to the Devil's Beat (2009)
- Hero & Heroine in Ascencia (2011)
- Prognostic (2014)
- The Ferryman's Curse (2017)
- Settlement (2021)
- The Magic Of It All (2023)

== Filmography ==
- Grave New World (1973, this had a limited theatrical release as a double bill with Emerson, Lake & Palmer's Pictures at an Exhibition)
- The Complete Strawbs: The Chiswick House Concert (2002)
- Strawbs Live in Tokyo 75 (2003, includes Grave New World)
- Acoustic Strawbs Live in Toronto (2004)
- Acoustic Strawbs – Live at Hampton Court Palace (2009)
- Strawbs Live in Gettysburg: Rites of Spring Festival (2016)
