= Dave Cousins =

English musician (1940–2025)

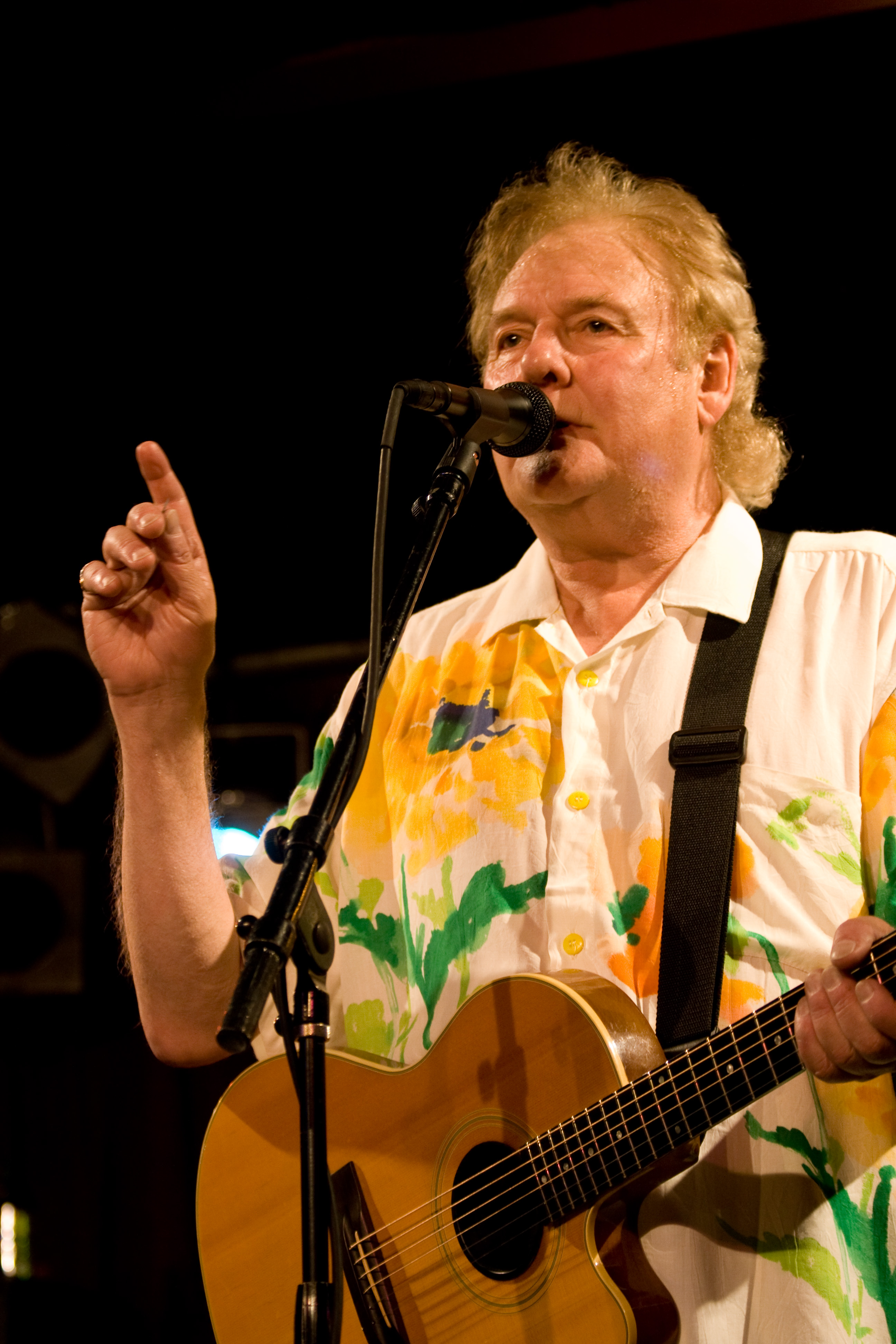
- Cousins performing in 2008

Background information
- Born: David Joseph Hindson; 7 January 1940; Hounslow, Middlesex, England
- Died: 13 July 2025 (aged 85) Canterbury, Kent, England
- Genres: Bluegrass; progressive folk; progressive rock
- Occupations: Singer; musician; songwriter
- Instruments: Vocals; guitar; banjo; appalachian dulcimer
- Years active: 1963–2023
- Label: A&M
- Formerly of: Strawbs

David Joseph Cousins (born David Joseph Hindson; 7 January 1940 – 13 July 2025) was an English musician. He was the leader, singer and most-active songwriter of Strawbs, from 1967.

Cousins was a founding member of Strawbs, which started out as the Strawberry Hill Boys playing bluegrass music, then moved on to folk, folk rock, and progressive rock. He also performed as an acoustic duo with Strawbs guitarist Brian Willoughby, and as Acoustic Strawbs with Willoughby (until August 2004), Dave Lambert and Chas Cronk (from September 2004).

== Biography ==
Cousins was born in Hounslow in Middlesex on 7 January 1940, the only son of Joseph Hindson and Violet Luck. His father was killed in action in the Second World War. His mother married Jack Cousins when he was aged six and he took his stepfather's surname. Cousins grew up in Chiswick and was educated at Thames Valley Grammar School in Twickenham, where he met future band member Tony Hooper. In the 1970s he returned to live there, rehearsing in Chiswick's Mawson Arms pub. He held a degree in Statistics and Pure Mathematics from the University of Leicester, and also followed a career in radio. He was a producer for Denmark's Radio 1969–1979, was programme controller for Radio Tees (1980–1982), and the managing director of Devon Air in Devon (1982–1990). From 1991 onwards, Cousins was in charge of St. David's Research, and was instrumental in many successful franchise applications business ventures involving local radio stations in the UK; stations such as Thames Radio (Kingston-upon-Thames), Radio Victory (Portsmouth) and XFM in London.

He ran Witchwood Media Limited, an independent record and publishing company, until the company's catalogue was sold to Cherry Red Limited. Cousins once toured North America and Europe with Acoustic Strawbs, several months every year. In February 2012, a new venture with producer Chris Tsangarides was announced, the Dark Lord Records label; the first release was by band Spit Like This on 21 May. In 2014 Cousins' autobiography Exorcising Ghosts: Strawbs and Other Lives was published by Witchwood Media Limited.

In December 2021, Cousins announced his withdrawal from live performance for health reasons, but played a one-off charity gig at the Boston Room at the George IV pub on Chiswick High Road on 21 November 2022. The event was in aid of the Commonwealth Medical Trust, of which Cousins was a trustee, to support its joint project with Safe Hands, to provide water tanks in remote parts of Africa, a project being carried out in conjunction with the University of Leicester and Makerere University in Kampala, Uganda.

The University of Leicester awarded Cousins an honorary Doctor of Music (D. Mus) degree on 20 January 2023.

On 11 August 2023, Dave Cousins and Strawbs gave their final live show and farewell gig at Fairport's Cropredy Convention.

== Special appearances ==
In 1980, Cousins made a guest appearance on On Through the Night, the debut album by British heavy metal group Def Leppard. Cousins' speaking voice can be heard at the beginning of "When the Walls Came Tumblin' Down", reciting a melancholy tale that serves as the track's intro. According to his autobiography, Cousins did his best Laurence Olivier impersonation for the intro.

== Personal life and death ==
Cousins was married and divorced three times. He had five children. In 2003 he moved, with his third wife Geraldine, from Teddington in London to Deal in Kent, so they could be nearer his house in France.

Cousins lived at Sandgate, near Folkestone in Kent. He faced a number of health issues, including a major cancer operation, stent replacements and a full knee replacement. Cousins died at the Pilgrims Hospice in Canterbury, on 13 July 2025, at the age of 85.

== Albums ==
- Two Weeks Last Summer (1972) (with Roger Glover, Rick Wakeman, Dave Lambert, etc.)
- Old School Songs (1980) (with Brian Willoughby)
- The Bridge (1994) (with Brian Willoughby)
- Hummingbird (2002) (with Rick Wakeman)
- Wakeman and Cousins "Live 1988" (2005) (with Rick Wakeman)
- High Seas (2005) (with Conny Conrad)
- The Boy in the Sailor Suit (2007)
- Secret Paths (2008)
- Duochrome (2008) (with Ian Cutler) live recordings from the US tour in March 2008
- Moving Pictures (2015) solo acoustic live recording from The Kent Stage, Kent, Ohio US 15 March 2008

== See also ==
- Strawbs discography
