= Greatest Hits Live (Strawbs album) =

Live album by Strawbs
- Released: 1993
- Recorded: 1990
- Genre: Progressive rock
- Label: Road Goes on Forever

Strawbs chronology
A Choice Selection of Strawbs (1992)	Greatest Hits Live (1993)	Heartbreak Hill (1995)

Greatest Hits Live is a live album by English band Strawbs.

== Track listing ==
1. "Cut Like a Diamond" (Dave Cousins, Chas Cronk)
2. "Something for Nothing" (Cousins, Cronk)
3. "The Hangman and the Papist" (Cousins)
4. "Ringing Down the Years" (Cousins)
5. "Stormy Down" (Cousins)
6. "Afraid to Let You Go" (Rod Demick, Richard Hudson, Brian Willoughby)
7. "Grace Darling" (Cousins)
8. "The River/Down by the Sea" (Cousins)
9. "Lay Down" (Cousins)
10. "Part of the Union" (Hudson, John Ford)
11. "Hero and Heroine" (Cousins)

== Personnel ==
- Dave Cousins – vocals, acoustic guitar
- Tony Hooper – vocals, acoustic guitar
- Richard Hudson – drums, vocals
- Brian Willoughby – electric guitar
- Chris Parren – keyboards
- Rod Demick – bass guitar, vocals

== Recording ==
Recorded in 1990 for Central TV's Bedrock series.

== Release history ==
Region	Date	Label	Format	Catalog
United Kingdom	1993	Road Goes on Forever	CD	RGDCD 015
	1992	Castle Music Pictures	VHS video with extra tracks	CMP 6077
	2001	Caroline 2 Limited	DVD (PAL) as "Classic Rock Legends"	CRL0794
