= A Choice Selection of Strawbs =

1992 compilation album by Strawbs

Compilation album by Strawbs
- Released: 19 October 1992
- Recorded: 1970–1976
- Genre: Folk rock; progressive folk; progressive rock
- Label: A&M

Strawbs chronology
Ringing Down the Years (1991)	A Choice Selection of Strawbs (1992)	Greatest Hits Live (1993)

A Choice Selection of Strawbs is a compilation album of songs by Strawbs.

== Track listing ==
Source: StawbsWeb

No.	Title	Writer(s)	Length
1.	"Lay Down"	Dave Cousins
2.	"Lemon Pie"	Cousins
3.	"Lady Fuschia"	Richard Hudson, John Ford
4.	"Autumn; Heroine's Theme; Deep Summer's Sleep; The Winter Long"	John Hawken; Cousins; Cousins
5.	"A Glimpse of Heaven"	Cousins
6.	"The Hangman and the Papist"	Cousins
7.	"New World"	Cousins
8.	"Round and Round"	Cousins
9.	"I Only Want My Love to Grow in You"	Cousins, Chas Cronk
10.	"Benedictus"	Cousins
11.	"Hero and Heroine"	Cousins
12.	"Song of a Sad Little Girl"	Cousins
13.	"Tears and Pavan; Tears; Pavan"	Cousins; Hudson, Ford, Cousins
14.	"To Be Free"	Cousins
15.	"Part of the Union"	Hudson, Ford
16.	"Down by the Sea"	Cousins

== Personnel ==
- Dave Cousins – lead vocals, backing vocals, guitar, dulcimer (all tracks)
- Tony Hooper – backing vocals, guitar (tracks 6,7,10,12)
- Dave Lambert – lead vocals, backing vocals, guitar (tracks 1,2,3,4,8,9,11,13,14,15,16)
- John Ford – bass guitar, acoustic guitar (tracks 1,3,5,6,7,10,12,13,15,16), lead vocals, backing vocals
- Chas Cronk – bass guitar (tracks 2,4,8,9,11,14), backing vocals
- Richard Hudson – drums, percussion, sitar (tracks 1,3,5,6,7,10,12,13,15,16)backing vocals
- Rick Wakeman – keyboards (tracks 5,6,12)
- Blue Weaver – keyboards (tracks 1,3,7,10,13,15,16)
- John Hawken – keyboards (tracks 2,4,8,11)
- Robert Kirby – keyboards (track 9)
- John Mealing – keyboards (track 9)
- Rod Coombes – drums (tracks 2,4,8,9,11,14)

== Release history ==
Region	Date	Label	Format	Catalog
	1992	A&M	CD	CDMID 173
	1992	A&M	cassette	CDID 173
