= Blue Angel (Strawbs album) =

Studio album by Strawbs
- Released: 2003
- Recorded: October 2002
- Genre: British folk rock
- Length: 55:58
- Label: Witchwood
- Producer: Dave Cousins, Brian Willoughby, Chas Cronk

Strawbs chronology
Tears and Pavan (2002)	Blue Angel (2003)	Déjà Fou (2004)

Blue Angel is the 15th studio album by English band Strawbs. It was the first Strawbs album in 12 years to contain new material and featured several different line-ups of musicians from past Strawbs eras. Welsh folk-singer Mary Hopkin featured on many tracks, continuing a working partnership established by Dave Cousins and Brian Willoughby on their album The Bridge, from which several of the tracks on this album are drawn.

The track "Blue Angel" is a rearrangement of the track which appears on Dave Cousins' first solo album Two Weeks Last Summer. "Lay Down" is a re-recorded version of the hit single from Bursting at the Seams. "Sealed With a Traitor's Kiss" is a rearrangement of a track which appears on 1978 studio album Deadlines. The bonus track is the original 1979 version - also released as a single - of a track which later appeared on the 1991 studio album Ringing Down the Years.

== Reception ==
Jimmy James in an AllMusic review feels that the album returns to the band's Seventies music style, particularly in its "combination of folk-rock and progressive rock melodies and arrangements".

== Track listing ==
1. "Blue Angel" (Dave Cousins) – 11:13
  "Divided"
  "Half Worlds Apart"
  "At Rest"
2. "Oh So Sleepy" (Cousins) – 3:44
3. "Further Down the Road" (Cousins) – 3:25
4. "There Will Come the Day" (Cousins, Don Airey) – 6:05
5. "Strange Day Over the Hill" (Cousins) – 3:56
6. "Cry No More" (Cousins, Brian Willoughby) – 3:18
7. "The Plain" (Cousins) – 5:48
8. "Do You Remember" (Cousins, Willoughby) – 3:12
9. "Rhythm of the Night" (Cousins) – 3:19
10. "Morning Glory" (Cousins) – 4:52
11. "Sealed With a Traitor's Kiss" (Cousins) – 2:57
12. "Lay Down" (Cousins) – 4:09

Bonus track

1. "The King" (Cousins) – 2:38

== Personnel ==
- Dave Cousins – lead vocals, backing vocals, acoustic guitar, piano (11)
- Brian Willoughby – electric guitar
- Dave Lambert – electric guitar (2,9), vocals (2,9)
- Blue Weaver – keyboards (except 11 and 13), programming (4), orchestration (10)
- Andy Richards – keyboards ("The King")
- Rod Demick – backing vocals (1,4,5,12), bass guitar (1,4,5,12), harmonica (5)
- Chas Cronk – bass guitar (2,3,6,8,9,10,"The King"), backing vocals (4,9,"The King"), bass pedals (7), programming (7,8)
- Richard Hudson – backing vocals (1,4,5,12), drums (1,5,12)
- Rod Coombes – drums (2,9)
- Tony Fernandez – drums (3,10,"The King"), tom-toms (7)

Additional personnel

- Mary Hopkin – vocals (1,3,4,6,8,10,12)
- Cathryn Craig – vocals (4)
- Terry Cassidy – vocals (4)
- Jana Heller – vocals (9)
- Roy Hill – vocals (9)
- Tommy Lundy – vocals (9)
- Maddy Prior – vocals ("The King")
- Rick Kemp – vocals ("The King")

== Recording ==
- Dave Cousins, Brian Willoughby, Chas Cronk – producers
- Mixed by Dave Cousins and Kenny Denton at KD's Studio, Chiswick, London, October 2002

== Release history ==
Region	Date	Label	Format	Catalog
United Kingdom	2003	Witchwood	CD	WMCD2008
