= Andy Richards =

British record producer

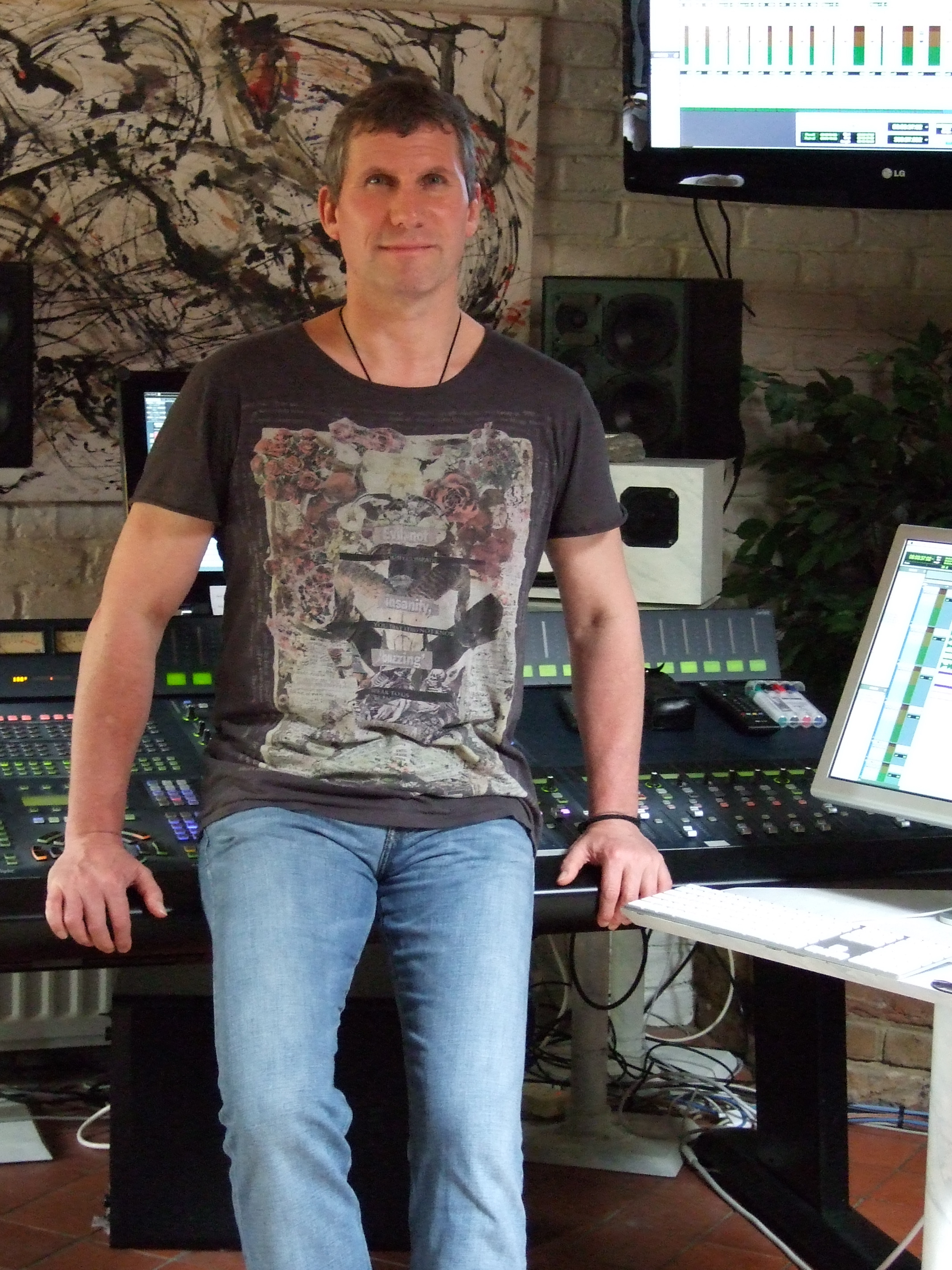
- Richards in his studio, Out of Eden, September 2009

Background information
- Born: Andrew John Richards; 26 October 1952 (age 73); London, England
- Genres: Pop; rock; folk; jazz; classical; alternative; soundtrack
- Occupations: Musician, composer, producer, film scoring mixer and engineer, music supervisor
- Instrument: Keyboards
- Years active: 1978–present
- Website: andyrichards.com

Andrew John Richards (born 26 October 1952) is an English pianist, composer, music producer and keyboardist.

Richards has played with artists including Frankie Goes to Hollywood, George Michael, Propaganda, Grace Jones, Rush, Annie Lennox, Gary Moore, Pet Shop Boys, Godley & Creme, Dusty Springfield, Petula Clark, Strawbs, OMD, Malcolm McLaren, Nik Kershaw, T'Pau, Maddy Prior and Denny Laine. Richards has performed and programmed keyboards on eight UK No. 1 singles, namely: "Relax" (1984) and "Two Tribes" (1984) by Frankie Goes to Hollywood, "Careless Whisper" (1984) by George Michael, "The Lady in Red" (1986) by Chris de Burgh, "It's a Sin" (1987), "Always on My Mind" (1987) and "Heart" (1988) by Pet Shop Boys, and "Spaceman" (1996) by Babylon Zoo.

Richards worked on films including Bridget Jones's Diary (2001), Touching the Void (2003), The Last King of Scotland (2006), Slumdog Millionaire (2009), which gained two Academy Awards for the music, and 127 Hours (2010).

== Early life ==
Richards began studying piano at the age of six. At eight, he went to Yarlet School in Staffordshire, England. He also took up the organ and by age 13, whilst at Rugby School (Warwickshire), he dropped piano tuition to focus full-time on the classical organ. He studied with David Gatward in the school chapel which housed a cathedral-sized 4 manual Walker organ.

Richards left Rugby School at the age of 17 and moved to London where he played with various artists and bands, including the singer Maggie Nicols at her experimental voice and jazz workshops at the Oval House Theatre. At that time, Richards also took jazz piano lessons with jazz pianist Howard Riley.

At 19, Richards returned to the Midlands and studied piano, organ and composition under Dr. Leon Forrester in Newcastle-under-Lyme. In 1975 he gained an LRAM in Pianoforte Teaching and 1976 an ARCM in Pianoforte Performance, while at the same time working and playing in a number of semi-professional rock and jazz-rock bands in Stoke-on-Trent. After completing his studies with Leon Forrester, Richards taught music at South Cheshire College.

== Career ==
=== Strawbs ===
In October 1977, Richards auditioned for the folk-rock band, Strawbs. Pete Solley, the producer and keyboard player in the band Paladin spotted Richards playing in the band 'Rock Workshop' in Stoke-on-Trent and recommended him to Dave Cousins at a time when Strawbs were looking for a full-time keyboardist. A week later, Dave Cousins and the band invited him to join the group.

Richards toured and recorded with Strawbs, his first gig being at the Hammersmith Odeon in London, but the first album that he made with them in 1978 had its release stalled due to management and record company problems. Heartbreak Hill was recorded at Startling Studios in Ascot, Ringo Starr's home. Heartbreak Hill was finally released in 1995.

In 1979, Tom Allom, Heartbreak Hill's record producer, invited Richards to play for the very first time as a session musician on Michael Chapman's album Life on the Ceiling at Sawmills Studios in Cornwall.

=== Early sessions ===
In mid-1980, Strawbs split up and Richards became a musician for hire, working and recording with Maddy Prior (from Steeleye Span) and Denny Laine (from Wings) touring both Europe and Scandinavia. He played on sessions for Junior Campbell (from Marmalade) at Startling Studios and in Manchester at Pluto Studios with Keith Hopwood where he played keyboards and wrote a number of jingles.

Whilst in Manchester, he was part of a band called Sneaky Pierre, featuring the cream of Manchester's session musicians which included some members of Sad Café, and in 1983 was invited by Mike Stone of Clay Records to produce the synth-pop band White Door from Stoke-on-Trent. It was recorded at Pluto Studios by Phil Bush and was mixed in Sarm East Studios by Julian Mendelsohn who was working with Trevor Horn at the time.

=== Trevor Horn and "Relax" ===
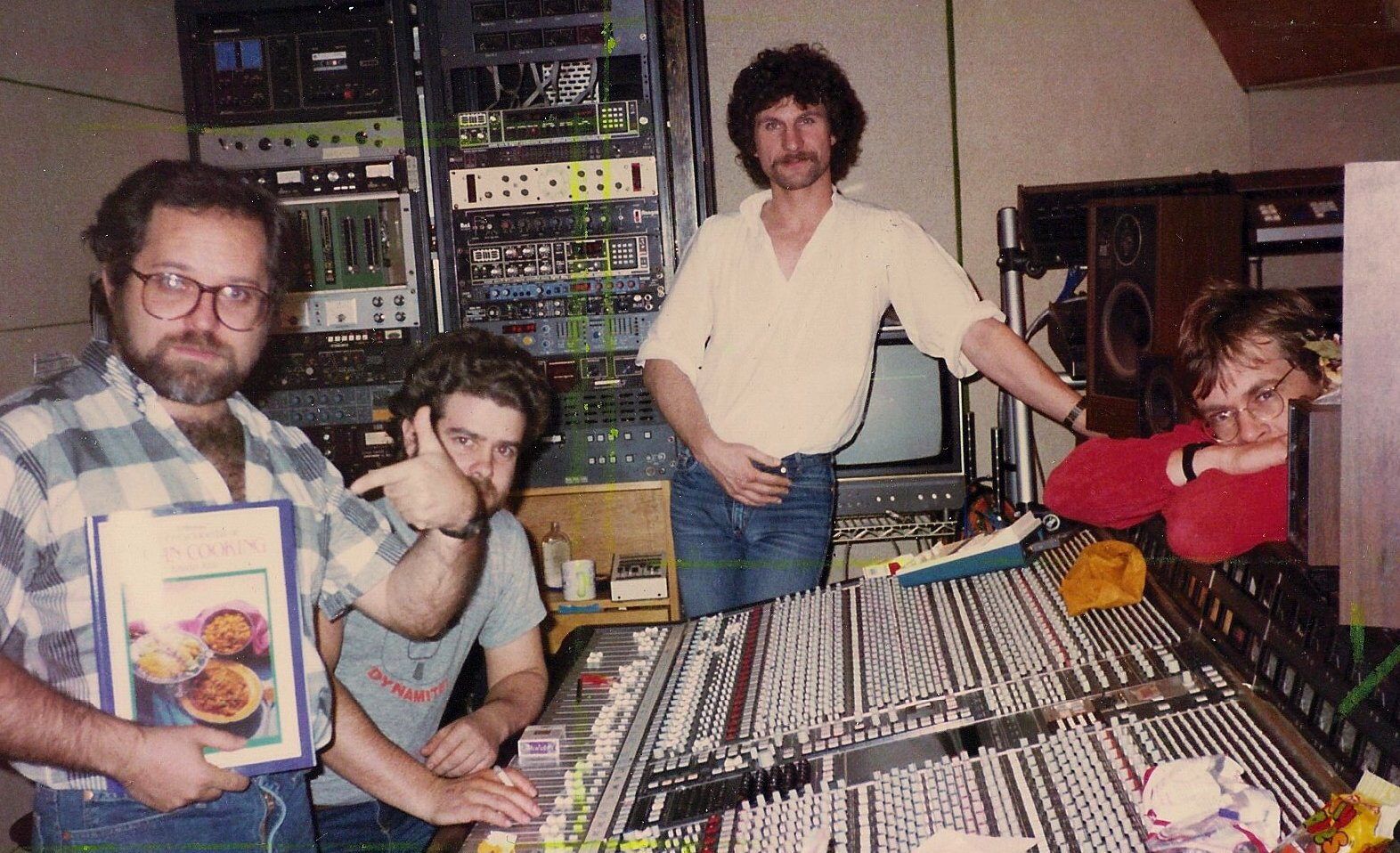
Richards (centre) with producer Peter Collins (left), Julian Mendelsohn (2nd left) and J. J. Jeczalik (right) in Sarm East Studios, London. 1984. Photograph c/o Andy Kinch.

In the fall of 1983, Richards was playing keyboards for the show Electric Ice, which was being performed at the Victoria Palace Theatre by ice skater Robin Cousins and his troupe of skaters, when he received 2 calls – one from the band Yes and the other from record producer Trevor Horn via a recommendation from audio engineer and mixer Julian Mendelsohn. He auditioned for Yes but immediately began work as Horn's keyboard player in October 1983; the first track they recorded together being Frankie Goes to Hollywood's "Ferry 'Cross the Mersey", written by Gerry Marsden, and the second was "Relax".

Horn had made 3 versions of "Relax" prior to Richards and guitarist Stephen Lipson joining his ZTT Production 'Theam' in late 1983. Horn left the studio late one night asking for Lipson to erase the multitrack (of version 3) due to lack of progress, but came back into the studio some time later to hear Richards playing a variety of modal chords based around the key of E minor with Lipson playing guitar along to the unerased multitrack. The final version of "Relax" was born and it won Best British Single at the 1985 Brit Awards and was at No. 1 in the UK charts for 5 weeks after being banned from BBC Radio, initially by DJ Mike Read, for being "obscene".

In 1984 as a keyboard player, Richards was at number one on the UK Singles Chart for a total of 19 weeks, performing on Frankie Goes to Hollywood's "Relax" and "Two Tribes" and George Michael's "Careless Whisper". This launched his career as both a Fairlight programmer and a top UK session musician. During the following years, apart from playing the keyboards for Frankie Goes to Hollywood, Richards played with bands and artists including Propaganda, Grace Jones, Nik Kershaw, Rush, Gary Moore, Pet Shop Boys, Dusty Springfield, Petula Clark, Seal and Godley & Creme.

=== Music production ===
From the mid-1980s and throughout the 1990s, Richards continued with his session work but also branched out into record production, producing for bands and artists including Pet Shop Boys (with "Heart" being at No. 1 in the UK for 3 weeks), T'Pau, Fuzzbox, Prefab Sprout, Malcolm McLaren, Silent Running (band), Dusty Springfield, Petula Clark, OMD and Berlin.

=== Out of Eden Studios and film score mixing ===
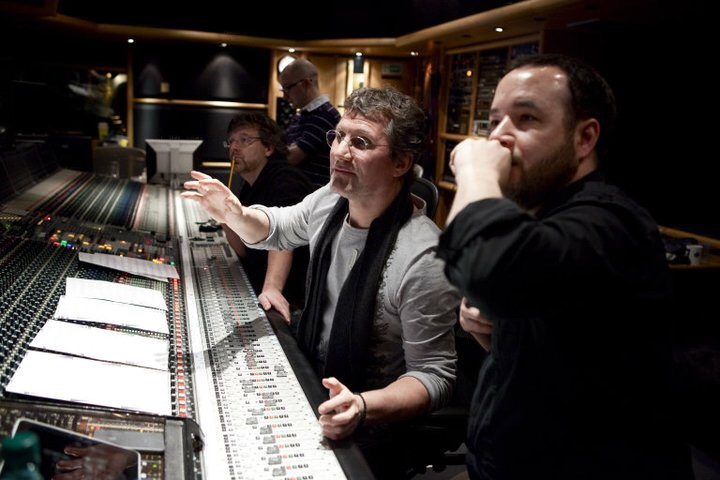
Richards (2nd from front) recording at Air Studios with director Derek Frey, Mike Higham & Ric Levy, 2011. Photograph c/o Leah Gallo

In 2000, Richards setup one of London's first bespoke all-digital mixing/recording studios, Out of Eden – a partnership between himself and the directors of the late studio complex Eden Studios in Chiswick, West London. It was a revolutionary audio concept which was the subject of a number of articles on the web, including The Polymath Perspective. It was here that Richards began the transition from being purely music-based into being involved in music for film and beyond.

In 2005, Richards began a partnership with acclaimed film music editor and producer Mike Higham (who had also worked with Trevor Horn) which has endured as Higham-Richards.

Film scores mixed in Out of Eden include Bridget Jones's Diary (2001), Dirty Pretty Things (2002), Mona Lisa Smile (2003), Touching the Void (2003), Shaun of the Dead (2004) and The Last King of Scotland (2006).

=== Current projects ===
Richards continues to run his own digital studio, Out of Eden, in West London where he has mixed a number of film scores, including the surround scores for Danny Boyle's Slumdog Millionaire (2009) (which gained 2 Oscars) and 127 Hours (2010), State of Play (2009) and Tim Burton's Frankenweenie (2012) and Sweeney Todd: The Demon Barber of Fleet Street (2007) (nominated for a Grammy). On The Demon Barber of Fleet Street and Frankenweenie (2012), Richards played the classical organ in the chapel of his alma mater, Rugby School.

He worked on his solo project entitled This Time... An Imaginary Soundtrack that was due for release in 2019.

== Discography ==
=== 1970s ===
Year	Title	Artist	Credits
1978	Heartbreak Hill	Strawbs	Piano, synthesizers
1978	Life on the Ceiling	Michael Chapman	Piano, synthesizers
1979	The Old Pals Act	Peter Bennett	Synthesizer (Yamaha CS80)

=== 1980s ===
Year	Title	Artist	Credits
1980	Snaigow	Dougie MacLean	Synthesizers
1980	Japanese Tears	Denny Laine	Keyboards, piano, organ
1981	My Very Favourite Nursery Rhymes	Tim Hart and Friends	Synthesizers
1981	On a Wing and a Prayer	Dougie MacLean	Piano, synthesizers
1982	The Unexpected Guest	Demon	Keyboards, synthesizers
1983	Windows	White Door	Keyboards, synthesizers, producer
1983	Mixed Emotions	Ian Sutherland	Synthesizers
1983	The Plague	Demon	Keyboards, synthesizers
1983	Love Breakdown (single)	White Door	Keyboards, synthesizers, producer
1984	Phonogenic	R.P.M.	Piano, synthesizers
1984	Make It Big	Wham!	Piano, synthesizers
1984	The Riddle	Nik Kershaw	Keyboards
1984	Welcome to the Pleasuredome	Frankie Goes to Hollywood	Keyboards, synthesizers
1984	You Caught Me Out (single)	Tracey Ullman	Keyboards
1984	Careless Whisper	George Michael	Piano, synthesizers
1984	Relax (single)	Frankie Goes to Hollywood	Pianos, keyboards, synthesizers
1984	Two Tribes (single)	Frankie Goes to Hollywood	Pianos, keyboards, synthesizers
1985	Phantasmagoria	The Damned	Keyboards
1985	The Ups and Downs	Stephen Duffy	Keyboards
1985	Whats the Password	Trio	Keyboards
1985	Power Windows	Rush	Guest artist, keyboards, programming
1985	A Secret Wish	Propaganda	Keyboards, synthesizers
1985	Big Music	Machinations	Keyboards, Fairlight programming
1985	Shine	Kids in the Kitchen	Keyboards
1985	Slave to the Rhythm	Grace Jones	Keyboards, synthesizers
1985	Run for Cover	Gary Moore	Keyboards
1985	Air Supply	Air Supply	Keyboards, synthesizers, programming
1985	Kiss and Tell (single)	The David Austin Band	Keyboards, synthesizers, programming
1985	Cry	Godley & Creme	Keyboards, synthesizers, programming
1986	Disco	Pet Shop Boys	Keyboards, Fairlight programming
1986	Radio Musicola	Nik Kershaw	Keyboards, programming
1986	Liverpool	Frankie Goes to Hollywood	Keyboards, Fairlight programming
1986	Into the Light	Chris de Burgh	Keyboards, synthesizers, programming
1986	Enough is Enough	Billy Squier	Keyboards, Fairlight programming
1986	Count Three & Pray	Berlin	Keyboards, Fairlight programming, producer
1986	Suburbia (single)	Pet Shop Boys	Keyboards, synthesizers, programming
1986	The Lady in Red (single)	Chris de Burgh	Keyboards, synthesizers, programming
1987	Hold Your Fire	Rush	Keyboards, Fairlight programming
1987	Actually	Pet Shop Boys	Keyboards, Fairlight programming, producer
1987	Soldier of Fortune (single)	Thin Lizzy	Keyboards, Fairlight programming
1987	Walk on Fire	Silent Running	Keyboards, Fairlight programming, producer
1987	Always on My Mind (single)	Pet Shop Boys	Keyboards, Fairlight programming
1987	It's a Sin (single)	Pet Shop Boys	Keyboards, Fairlight programming
1987	Rent (single)	Pet Shop Boys	Keyboards, Fairlight programming
1988	The Power of Six	The Mint Juleps	Keyboards, Fairlight programming
1988	Introspective	Pet Shop Boys	Keyboards, Fairlight programming
1988	Medicine Man	Habit	Keyboards, Fairlight programming, producer
1988	After the War	Gary Moore	Keyboards, Fairlight programming
1988	Flying Colours	Chris de Burgh	Keyboards, Fairlight programming
1988	Push	Bros	Keyboards, Fairlight programming
1988	Don't Say Goodbye	Strawbs	Keyboards, synthesizers
1988	Hey Manhattan! (single)	Prefab Sprout	Keyboards, Fairlight programming, producer
1988	Heart (single)	Pet Shop Boys	Keyboards, Fairlight programming, producer
1988	Missing You	Chris de Burgh	Keyboards, Fairlight programming
1989	Waltz Darling	Malcolm McLaren	Keyboards, Fairlight programming, producer
1989	Results	Liza Minnelli	Keyboards, Fairlight programming
1989	Blast	Holly Johnson	Keyboards, Fairlight programming, producer
1989	Big Bang!	Fuzzbox	Keyboards, Fairlight programming, producer
1989	Love and Power	Cry No More	Keyboards, Fairlight programming, producer
1989	Young Man Running	Corey Hart	Keyboards, Fairlight programming, producer
1989	The Best of Berlin 1979–1988	Berlin	Keyboards, Fairlight programming, producer
1989	Losing My Mind (single)	Liza Minnelli	Keyboards, Fairlight programming
1989	Love Train (single)	Holly Johnson	Keyboards, Fairlight programming, producer
1989	Americanos (single)	Holly Johnson	Keyboards, Fairlight programming, producer
1989	International Rescue (single)	Fuzzbox	Keyboards, Fairlight programming, producer
1989	Oh Sharon (single)	Cry No More	Keyboards, Fairlight programming, producer

=== 1990s ===
Year	Title	Artist	Credits
1990	1234	Propaganda	Keyboards
1990	Move Until We Fly	Nick Kamen	Keyboards, Fairlight programming, producer
1990	Planet Oz	Inga Humpe	Keyboards, Fairlight programming, producer
1990	Reputation	Dusty Springfield	Keyboards, Fairlight programming, producer
1991	The Promise	T'Pau	Keyboards, Fairlight programming, producer
1991	Discography: The Complete Singles Collection	Pet Shop Boys	Keyboards, Fairlight programming, producer
1991	Sugar Tax	Orchestral Manoeuvres in the Dark	Keyboards, Fairlight programming, producer
1991	Dreams That Money Can't Buy	Holly Johnson	Keyboards, Fairlight programming, producer
1991	Call My Name (single)	Orchestral Manoeuvres in the Dark	Keyboards, Fairlight programming, producer
1992	If You Don't Love Me (single)	Prefab Sprout	Keyboards, Fairlight programming, producer
1992	The Singles	Corey Hart	Keyboards, Fairlight programming, producer
1992	Oxygen (single)	Petula Clark	Keyboards, Fairlight programming, producer
1994	Blue Nights	Denny Laine	Keyboards, synthesizers
1994	Can't Get Off	Robin Beck	Keyboards, Fairlight programming, producer
1995	Heart and Soul - The Very Best of T'Pau	T'Pau	Keyboards, Fairlight programming, producer
1995	Anthology	Nik Kershaw	Keyboards, programming
1995	Memento: The Best of Maddy Prior	Maddy Prior	Keyboards
1995	Are My Ears on Wrong?	Jakko	Keyboards
1995	Medusa / Live in Central Park	Annie Lennox	Keyboards
1995	Right Here, Right Now (single)	The Flood	Keyboards, Fairlight programming, producer
1995	Free Vol (single)	Pierre Morin	Keyboards, Fairlight programming, producer
1995	Wherever Would I Be	Dusty Springfield & Daryl Hall	Keyboards, Fairlight programming, producer
1995	No More I Love You's (single)	Annie Lennox	Keyboards
1996	Reach for the Sky: The Anthology	Billy Squier	Keyboards, synthesizers
1996	Spaceman (single)	Babylon Zoo	Fairlight programming
1997	Reputation & Rarities	Dusty Springfield	Keyboards, Fairlight programming, producer
1997	The Plant Life Years	Dougie MacLean	Mini Moog, piano
1998	Salvation	Alphaville	Keyboards, Fairlight programming, producer
1998	Wishful Thinking (single)	Alphaville	Keyboards, Fairlight programming, producer
1998	Human Being	Seal	Keyboards, Fairlight programming
1998	The OMD Singles	Orchestral Manoeuvres in the Dark	Keyboards, Fairlight programming, producer
1998	Where We Belong	Boyzone	Keyboards, programming
1999	Concert Classics, Vol 6: Alive in America	Strawbs	Keyboards
1999	Turn It On Again: The Hits	Genesis	programming
1999	The Seduction of Claude Debussy	Art of Noise	programming
1999	Visions of Dreamscapes	Alphaville	Keyboards, Fairlight programming, producer
1999	Every Day I Love You (single)	Boyzone	Keyboards

=== 2000s ===
Year	Title	Artist	Credits
2000	Ronan	Ronan Keating	Keyboards, piano, synthesizers, programming
2000	Sonnet	Oberon	Engineering
2000	Dino	Jessica Folker	Keyboards
2000	The Singles Collection: 1994–1999	Boyzone	Keyboards
2001	They Called Him Tin Tin	Stephen Duffy	Keyboards
2002	Tracey Ullman Takes on the Hits	Tracey Ullman	Keyboards
2002	Ringing Down the Years/Don't Say Goodbye	Strawbs	Keyboards, composer
2002	The Ultimate Collection	Petula Clark	Arranger, producer
2002	Kylie Fever: 2002 Live in Manchester (video)	Kylie Minogue	Producer, director
2003	Blue Angel	Strawbs	Keyboards, composer
2008	Gold	Dusty Springfield	Keyboards, producer

=== 2010s ===
Year	Title	Artist	Credits
2010	Ultimate	Pet Shop Boys	Keyboards, producer
2010	40th Anniversary Celebration Vol 1: Strawberry Fayre	Strawbs	Piano, synthesizer
2011	Sector 3	Rush	Keyboards, piano, synthesizers, programming
2011	Combined	Claudia Brücken	Keyboards, Fairlight programming
2013	Greatest Hits	Dido	Engineer, mixer
2015	Prognostic	Strawbs	Piano, synthesizers
2018	WGAF... AWGUI! (single)	Fuzzbox	Keyboards, programming, engineer, producer

== Filmography ==
=== 1980s ===
Year	Title	Credits
1986	Biggles: Adventures in Time	Keyboards, Fairlight programming
1987	Turnaround	Keyboards, Fairlight programming, composer (with Mark Shreeve), producer
1989	The BFG	Keyboards, Fairlight programming

=== 1990s ===
Year	Title	Credits
1995	The Glam Metal Detectives (TV series)	Keyboards, Fairlight programming
1996	True Blue	Keyboards, Fairlight programming

=== 2000s ===
Year	Title	Credits
2001	Bridget Jones's Diary	Score mixer
2001	The Parole Officer	Score mixer
2001	Mike Bassett: England Manager	Score mixer
2002	Dirty Pretty Things	Score mixer
2002	Ali G Indahouse	Score mixer
2002	My Little Eye	Score mixer
2003	Mona Lisa Smile	Score mixer
2003	Touching the Void	Score mixer
2003	Johnny English	Score mixer
2004	Terrible Kisses (short)	Composed, performed (as Andy Richards/Mike Higham), produced & score mixer
2004	Bushido: The Way of the Warrior (short)	Composed, performed (as Andy Richards/Mike Higham), produced & score mixer
2004	Dead Cool	Composed, performed (as Andy Richards/Mike Higham), produced & score mixer
2004	Shaun of the Dead	Score mixer
2004	Out of Reach	Score mixer
2004	Dear Frankie	Score mixer
2005	The Jacket	Score mixer, music supervisor & producer
2005	Avant l'oubli	Score mixer
2005	Mrs Henderson Presents	Music editor
2006	The Bridge	Score mixer
2006	The Last King of Scotland	Score mixer
2006	Wild Romance	Composed, performed (as Andy Richards/Mike Higham), produced & score mixer
2006	Tsunami: The Aftermath	Score mixer
2007	Hannibal Rising	Score mixer
2007	Sweeney Todd: The Demon Barber of Fleet Street	Music engineer, score mixer, organ & additional music.
2008	Incendiary	Score mixer
2008	Slumdog Millionaire	Score mixer
2009	State of Play	Score mixer

=== 2010s ===
Year	Title	Credits
2010	Inside Job	Score mixer
2010	Kick-Ass	Music editor
2010	The First Grader	Choir production, score mixer
2010	127 Hours	Score mixer
2011	The Rum Diary	Song producer: The Mermaid Song by Patti Smith
2011	The Ballad of Sandeep (short)	Composed, performed (as Andy Richards/Mike Higham), produced & score mixer
2012	Dark Shadows	Additional score mixer
2012	Frankenweenie	Organ and additional score mixer
2014	Big Eyes	Composed, performed, produced score mixed the cue: "The Art Gallery" by Andy Richards
2018	Mission: Impossible – Fallout	Piano
