= Old School Songs =

Studio album by Dave Cousins and Brian Willoughby
- Released: 1979
- Recorded: May and June 1979
- Genre: folk rock
- Label: Old School Records

Old School Songs is a studio album by singer-songwriter Dave Cousins of the band Strawbs and guitarist Brian Willoughby. It was released in 1979 on Old School Records.

== Track listing ==
All tracks written by Dave Cousins.

1. "Grace Darling"
2. "I've Been My Own Worst Friend"
3. "Ways and Means"
4. "You Keep Going Your Way"
5. "The Battle"
6. "The Hangman and the Papist"
7. "Hanging in the Gallery"
8. "Beside the Rio Grande"
9. "Josephine, For Better or for Worse"
10. "Lay Down"
11. "A Song for Me"

On the original vinyl recording, side 1 comprised tracks 1–5, side 2 tracks 6–11

== Bonus tracks ==
The Japanese re-issue contained two bonus tracks:

1. "You Never Needed Water" (Cousins)
2. "Song for Alex" (Cousins, Tony Hooper)

== Personnel ==
- Dave Cousins – lead vocals, backing vocals, guitar
- Brian Willoughby – guitar

== Recording ==
Studio tracks recorded at Music Works Live tracks recorded at the Exmouth Summer Festival on May 27, 1979 by Bob Pridden

- Al Williams – engineer

== Versions ==
- vinyl album SLURP1 (Old School Records, UK, 1979)
- vinyl album PB2013 (Passport Records, US, 1980)
- vinyl album PVC8901 (PVC Records, US, 1980)
- CD RGF CD 004 (Road Goes On Forever, 1991)
- CD RATCD 4218 (Muskrat, Japan, 2003)
- CD WMCD 2051 (Witchwood Media, UK, 2011)
