= Will Ye No Come Back Again? =

18th-century Scots poem by Carolina Nairne

"Will Ye No Come Back Again?", also known as "Bonnie Charlie", is a Scots poem by Carolina Oliphant (Lady Nairne), set to a traditional Scottish folk tune. As in several of the author's poems, its theme is the aftermath of the Jacobite Rising of 1745, which ended at the Battle of Culloden. Written well after the events it commemorates, it is not a genuine Jacobite song, like many other songs that were "composed in the late eighteenth and nineteenth centuries, but ... passed off as contemporary products of the Jacobite risings."

Lady Nairne came from a Jacobite family, and Prince Charles had stopped to dine at Nairne House on 4 September 1745, during the march to Edinburgh. Her father was exiled the year after, but the family "hoarded" a number of objects "supposedly given to him by Prince Charles."

The song, especially its melody, is widely and traditionally used as a song of farewell – often in association with Auld Lang Syne, and generally with no particular Jacobite or other political intent.

== Theme ==
The "Bonnie Charlie" of the song is "Bonnie Prince Charlie" or the Young Pretender, the last serious Stuart claimant to the British throne. After Culloden, he escaped to the continent with the help of Flora MacDonald, and other loyal followers. The song expresses joy in Bonnie Charlie's escape from capture and possible execution, and celebrates the loyalty of his followers and their longing for his return.

The song has been described as evoking a type of nostalgic idealism: "Who that hears "Bonnie Charlie" sung...but is touched by that longing for the unattainable which is the blessing and the despair of the idealist?"

== Use ==
The song has long been a "time honored Scottish farewell." In this function, it is generally sung (like Auld Lang Syne) as a "first verse and chorus". Also like Auld Lang Syne, the song has acquired a more general use: it was sung by Canadians, for instance, in honour of George VI in 1939; by Australians as a farewell to then-Princess Elizabeth in 1946; and by Elizabeth II's "Scottish subjects" in 1953. It was sung by an Australian choir to the departing athletes at the closing ceremonies of the Melbourne Summer Olympic Games in 1956, as seen in the 'Olympiad' documentary series by Bud Greenspan. American golfer, Bobby Jones, was serenaded out of St Andrews' Younger Hall to the tune, after being made an honorary freeman of the Borough of St Andrews, Scotland in October 1958.

With the rise of the Scottish nationalist movement it has become common to sing several verses of the song, especially the strongly "Jacobite" ones, apparently as an expression of desire for Scottish independence.

The song is played alongside Auld Lang Syne during the final slow march of graduating officers at BRNC Dartmouth

== Musical adaptations ==
Different adaptations exist, in SATB and TTBB. It was used as a theme in improvisations by organist Alexandre Guilmant and in a piano composition by James MacMillan.

== Lyrics ==
Different versions of the lyrics exist. These words seem to be Lady Nairne's own: they are taken from an 1869 edition of her songs, which cites five stanzas (alternating with the "Will ye no' come back again" chorus), of which the middle three are explicitly Jacobite. Some versions cite only two (the first and the last) stanzas, while others add several more that seem not to have been part of the original. For instance, in a 1901 anthology by James Welldon, two additional stanzas are found, and the poem is credited to "Anonymous." Variant wordings for some of the lyrics (especially our second verse) are also given by some sources. The second verse presented here rhymes, at least in Lady Nairn's Scots.

Bonnie Charlie's noo awa
Safely o'er the friendly main;
He'rts will a'most break in twa
Should he no' come back again.

Chorus:
Will ye no' come back again?
Will ye no' come back again?
Better lo'ed ye canna be
Will ye no' come back again?

Ye trusted in your Hieland men
They trusted you, dear Charlie;
They kent you hiding in the glen,
Your cleadin' was but barely.*

(Chorus)

English bribes were a' in vain
An' e'en tho puirer we may be
Siller canna buy the heart
That beats aye for thine and thee.

(Chorus)

We watch'd thee in the gloamin' hour
We watch'd thee in the mornin' grey
Tho' thirty thousand pound they'd gi'e
Oh, there is nane that wad betray.

(Chorus)

Sweet's the laverock's note and lang,
Liltin' wildly up the glen,
But aye to me he sings ane sang,
Will ye no come back again?

(Chorus)

*The line is a little obscure. Cleading is cognate with standard English "clad", in the sense of "covered" or "dressed" – probably a reference to Prince Charles being "barely concealed" is intended, although it could also refer to a lack of suitable clothing. Though the verb ‘clead’ means clothe and the noun ‘cleading’ means clothing, clothes according to the dictionary of Scots words in use from the latter part of the seventeenth century to the present day, first published in 1911.

== Notable performers ==
- The Clancy Brothers on the albums In Person At Carnegie Hall: The Complete 1963 Concert, The First Hurrah!, and Greatest Hits
- Mad Jack Churchill
- Ewan MacColl on the album The Jacobite Rebellions: Songs of the Jacobite Wars of 1715 and 1745
- Kenneth McKellar
- Real McKenzies on the album 10,000 Shots
- Jessie MacLachlan
- Jean Redpath on the album Will Ye No Come Back Again: The Songs of Lady Nairne
- Richard Thompson on his 1981 album Strict Tempo!
