= The Real McKenzies (album) =

Studio album by The Real McKenzies
- Released: 1995
- Recorded: 1995
- Genre: Celtic punk
- Length: 27:16
- Label: IFA Records
- Producer: Jon Dunleavy, The Real McKenzies

The Real McKenzies chronology
The Real McKenzies (1995)	Clash of the Tartans (1998)

The Real McKenzies is the debut album by The Real McKenzies, released in 1995.

== Track listing ==
1. "Scots Wha' Ha'e"
2. "Loch Lomond"
3. "Raise Yer Glass"
4. "Skye Boat Song"
5. "Sawney Beane Clan"
6. "Outta Scotch"
7. "Scottish and Proud"
8. "Kilt"
9. "Pliers"
10. "My Bonnie"

== Trivia ==
- "Outta Scotch" is a cover, with different words, of Out of Luck (song) by the Pointed Sticks
- "Kilt" is a cover, with different words, of Kill by Alberto y Lost Trios Paranoias
- "Pliers" is a cover, with different words, of Fire by Jimi Hendrix
