= Off the Leash =

Studio album by The Real McKenzies
- Released: August 5, 2008
- Recorded: 2008
- Genre: Celtic punk
- Length: 36:00
- Label: Fat Wreck Chords
- Producer: Jamie McMann, Fat Mike

The Real McKenzies chronology
10,000 Shots (2005)	Off the Leash (2008)	Shine Not Burn (2010)

Professional ratings
Review scores
Source	Rating
AbsolutePunk	69%

Off the Leash is the sixth album by Scottish-Canadian Celtic punk band The Real McKenzies. It was recorded in 2008 and released on August 5 of that year.

== Track listing ==
1. "Chip"
2. "The Lads Who Fought & Won"
3. "The Ballad of Greyfriars Bobby"
4. "Kings of Fife"
5. "Old Becomes New"
6. "White Knuckle Ride"
7. "The Maple Trees Remember"
8. "Anyone Else"
9. "My Mangy Hound"
10. "Too Many Fingers"
11. "Drink Some More"
12. "Guy on Stage"
13. "Culling the Herd"
