= Scots Wha Hae =

Patriotic song with lyrics by Robert Burns

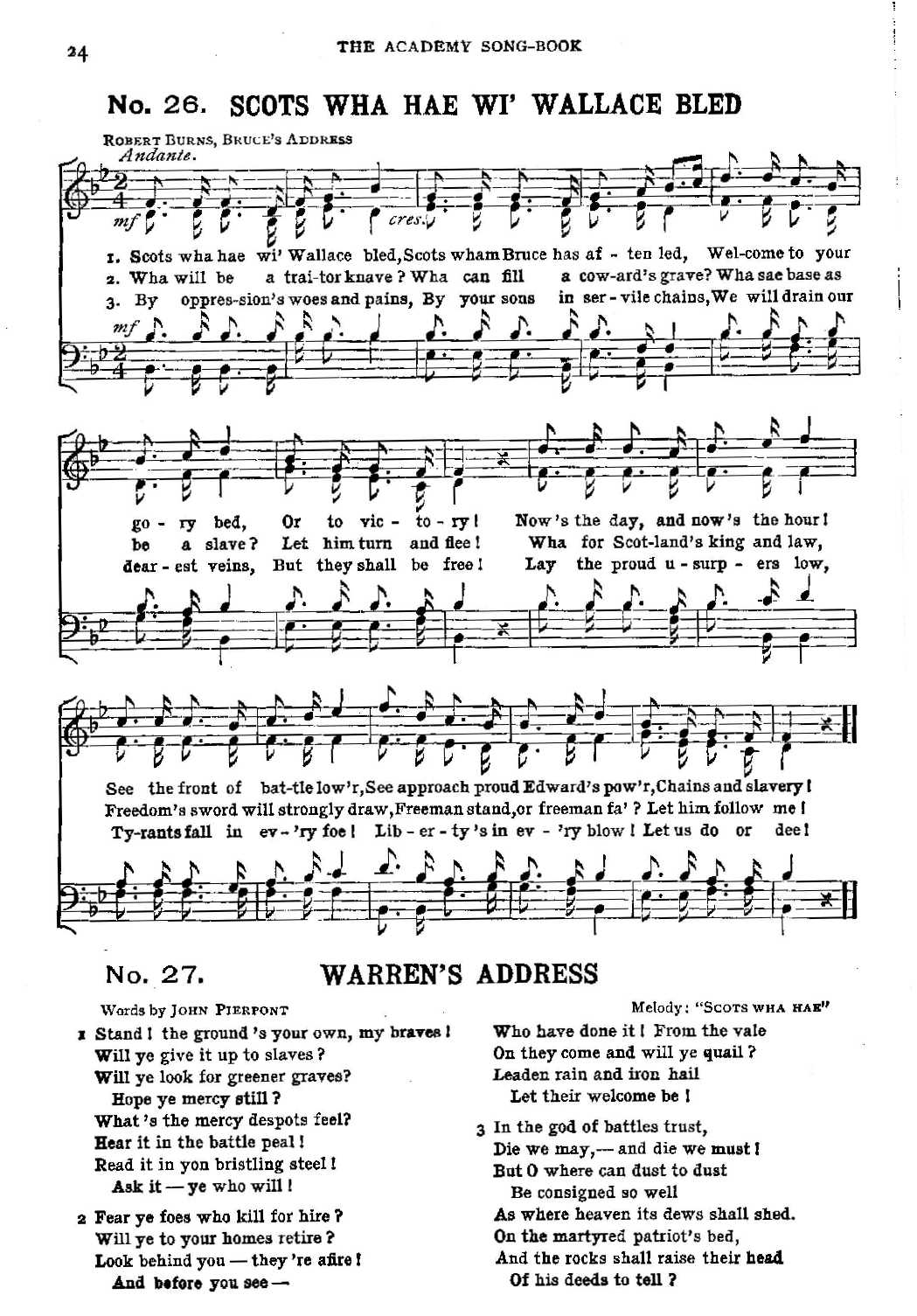
Scots Wha hae wi' Wallace Bled

"Scots Wha Hae" (English: Scots Who Have) is a patriotic song of Scotland written using both words of the Scots language and English. It has a Roud Folk Song Index number of 27546.

It served for centuries as an unofficial national anthem of the country, but by 2010, had been largely supplanted by "Scotland the Brave" and "Flower of Scotland".

== Background ==
The lyrics were written by Robert Burns in 1793, in the form of a speech given by Robert the Bruce before the Battle of Bannockburn in 1314 during the Scottish Wars of Independence. Although the lyrics are by Burns, he wrote them to the traditional Scottish tune "Hey Tuttie Tatie", which according to tradition, was played by Bruce's army at the Battle of Bannockburn. According to tradition, the same theme was played in 1429 by the Franco-Scots army at the siege of Orléans in front of Joan of Arc. The song, called "Marche des soldats de Robert Bruce" in France, belongs to the traditional list of military music, and commemorates the Auld Alliance between France and Scotland. As for the Battle of Bannockburn, the theme really played was probably a traditional Scottish theme such as "Hey Tuttie Tatie". The tune tends to be played as a slow air, but certain arrangements put it at a faster tempo, as in the Scottish Fantasy by Max Bruch, the concert overture Rob Roy by Hector Berlioz, and the Real McKenzies' punk rock rendition on their 1998 album Clash of the Tartans.

The song was sent by Burns to his publisher, George Thomson, at the end of August 1793, with the title "Robert Bruce's March To Bannockburn", and a postscript saying that he had been inspired by Bruce's "glorious struggle for Freedom, associated with the glowing ideas of some other struggles of the same nature, not quite so ancient." This is seen as a covert reference to the Radical movement, and particularly to the trial of Glasgow lawyer Thomas Muir of Huntershill, whose trial began on 30 August 1793 as part of a government crackdown, after the French Revolutionary Wars led to France declaring war on the Kingdom of Great Britain on 1 February 1793. Muir was accused of sedition for allegedly inciting the Scottish people to oppose the government during the December 1792 convention of the Scottish Friends of the People Society, and was eventually sentenced to 14 years' transportation to the convict settlement at Botany Bay. Burns was aware that if he declared his republican and radical sympathies openly, he could suffer the same fate.

When Burns notably agreed to let the Morning Chronicle, of 8 May 1794, publish the song, it was on the basis of "let them insert it as a thing they have met with by accident, and unknown to me." The song was included in the 1799 edition of A Select Collection of Original Scottish Airs for the Voice, edited by George Thomson, but Thomson preferred the tune "Lewie Gordon", and had Burns add to the fourth line of each stanza, to suit. In the 1802 edition, the original words and tune were restored. In 1881, The New York Times, reviewing Our Familiar Songs and Those Who Made Them by Helen Kendrick Johnson, asserted that no song was "more glorious" than "Scots, wha hae wi Wallace bled", explaining that once Burns' poem had been set to the tune of Hey Tuttie Tatie, it "marched through the land forever, loud, and triumphant." "Scots Wha Hae" is the party song of the Scottish National Party. In the past, it was sung at the close of their annual national conference each year. The tune was adapted for military band as Marche des soldats de Robert Bruce by French army Chef de Musique Léonce Chomel, and recorded around 1910 in his Marches historiques, chants et chansons des soldats de France. The tune is also featured in the fourth movement of the Scottish Fantasy, composed in 1880 by German composer Max Bruch .

== Lyrics ==
Original lyrics Scots, wha hae wi Wallace bled, Scots, wham Bruce has aften led, Welcome tae yer gory bed, Or tae victorie.	Standard English translation Scots, who have with Wallace bled, Scots, whom Bruce has often led, Welcome to your gory bed Or to victory.
Now's the day, an now's the hour: See the front o battle lour, See approach proud Edward's power— Chains and Slaverie.	Now's the day, and now's the hour: See the front of battle lower [threaten], See approach proud Edward's power— Chains and slavery.
Wha will be a traitor knave? Wha will fill a coward's grave? Wha sae base as be a slave? Let him turn a flee.	Who will be a traitor knave? Who will fill a coward's grave? Who's so base as be a slave? Let him turn and flee.
Wha, for Scotland's king and law, Freedom's sword will strongly draw, Freeman stand, or Freeman fa, Let him on wi me.	Who for Scotland's king and law, Freedom's sword will strongly draw, Freeman stand or freeman fall, Let him [go] on with me.
By Oppression's woes and pains, By your sons in servile chains! We will drain our dearest veins, But they shall be free.	By oppression's woes and pains, By your sons in servile chains! We will drain our dearest veins, But they shall be free.
Lay the proud usurpers low, Tyrants fa in every foe, Libertie's in every blow!— Let us do or dee.	Lay the proud usurpers low, Tyrants fall in every foe, Liberty's in every blow!— Let us do or die.

== In popular culture ==
- The opening lyrics of the song are the key words for the posthypnotic-suggestion programming of United Nations Exploratory Force soldiers in Joe Haldeman's military science-fiction novel The Forever War, intended to make them particularly aggressive in battle.
- In the Dad's Army episode "My British Buddy", Private Frazer recites a personally updated version of the song's second and third lyrics to an American colonel during the welcoming of the United States into World War II.
