= Beer and Loathing =

Studio album by The Real McKenzies
- Released: July 7, 2020
- Length: 36:07
- Label: Fat Wreck Chords

The Real McKenzies chronology
Two Devils Will Talk (2017)	Beer and Loathing (2020)

Professional ratings
Review scores
Source	Rating
New Noise	3.5/5 stars

Beer and Loathing is the tenth studio album by Canadian celtic punk band The Real McKenzies. It was released on July 3, 2020 under Fat Wreck Chords in the United States and Stomp Records in Canada.

== Single ==
The first single to be released, which is named after the album, was released on July 2, 2020. The second "Big Foot Steps" was released on May 31, 2020.

== Background ==
At the time of writing music for the album, the band were on a world tour, which ended up being postponed due to the COVID-19 pandemic.

== Track listing ==
The Real McKenzies track listing
No.	Title	Length
1.	"A Widows's Watch"	1:16
2.	"Overtoun Bridge"	4:20
3.	"Big Foot Steps"	3:35
4.	"Beer and Loathing"	2:39
5.	"Cock Up Your Beaver"	2:51
6.	"Nary Do Gooder"	2:06
7.	"Death of the Winnipeg Scene"	2:54
8.	"36 Barrels"	3:34
9.	"Whose Child is This"	3:13
10.	"The Ballad of Cpl. Hornburg"	3:38
11.	"The Cremation of Sam McGee"	4:27
12.	"A Seafarer's Return"	1:42
