= Westwinds =

Studio album by The Real McKenzies
- Released: March 27, 2012
- Studio: Crabapple Downs
- Genre: Celtic punk
- Length: 44:11
- Label: Fat Wreck Chords
- Producer: Steve Loree

The Real McKenzies chronology
Shine Not Burn (2010)	Westwinds (2012)	Rats in the Burlap (2015)

Professional ratings
Review scores
Source	Rating
PunkNews	3.5/5 stars

Westwinds is the seventh studio album by Canadian punk rock band The Real McKenzies. It was released on Fat Wreck Chords in 2012.

== Track list ==
No.	Title	Length
1.	"The Tempest"	4:07
2.	"Fool's Road"	2:52
3.	"I Do What I Want"	3:18
4.	"The Message"	3:54
5.	"My Luck is So Bad"	3:00
6.	"The Massacre of Glencoe"	2:41
7.	"The Bluenose"	2:57
8.	"Burnout"	2:39
9.	"Halloween"	3:39
10.	"Hi Lily"	2:56
11.	"My Head is Filled With Music"	2:59
12.	"Barrett's Privateers"	4:30
13.	"Pipe Solo - Francis Fraser"	2:50
14.	"Song For Mike"	1:49
