= Big Bang! =

1989 studio album by Fuzzbox

Studio album by Fuzzbox
- Released: 1989
- Recorded: 1988–89
- Studios: Sarm West Studios, London
- Genres: Pop rock; dance-pop; synth-pop; art pop
- Labels: WEA; Geffen
- Producer: Andy Richards

Fuzzbox chronology
| Bostin' Steve Austin (1986) | Big Bang! (1989) | Fuzz and Nonsense (2000) |

Singles from Big Bang!
- 1. "International Rescue" Released: 1989; 2. "Pink Sunshine" Released: 1989; 3. "Self!" Released: 1989; 4. "Walking on Thin Ice" Released: 1989

Professional ratings
Review scores
| Source | Rating |
|---|---|
| AllMusic | 3/5 stars |
| Record Mirror | 3/5 stars |

Big Bang! is the second album by English alternative rock group Fuzzbox, released in 1989. It includes four singles which reached the UK Singles Chart: "International Rescue" (No. 11), "Pink Sunshine" (No. 14), "Self!" (featuring a guitar solo by Brian May of Queen, No. 24) and a cover of Yoko Ono's "Walking on Thin Ice" (No. 76).

Big Bang! remains the final studio album by Fuzzbox; a follow-up had been planned but was shelved by their record company WEA due to the lack of success of the projected album's lead single, "Your Loss, My Gain", released in 1990. The band then broke up.

== Reception ==
Juke called it "a wonderful pop album the way Transvision Vamp is a wonderful pop band. In other words, Fuzzbox are not super-original but pop bands are not meant to be. It pokes its tongue out at us, makes us feel good. This is an album where 10 tracks could be singles."

== Track listing ==
| No. | Title | Writer(s) | Length |
|---|---|---|---|
| 1. | "Pink Sunshine" | Jo Dunne; Maggie Dunne; Vickie Perks; Liam Sternberg | 3:44 |
| 2. | "Fast Forward Futurama" | J. Dunne; M. Dunne; Sternberg | 3:52 |
| 3. | "Jamaican Sunrise" | J. Dunne; M. Dunne; Perks | 4:00 |
| 4. | "Walking on Thin Ice" | Yoko Ono | 3:46 |
| 5. | "Versatile for Discos and Parties" | Perks; Andy Richards; Sternberg | 5:16 |
| 6. | "International Rescue" | J. Dunne; M. Dunne; Tina O'Neill; Perks; Sternberg | 3:30 |
| 7. | "Self!" | J. Dunne; M. Dunne; O'Neill; Perks | 3:41 |
| 8. | "Irish Bride" | M. Dunne; Perks | 3:32 |
| 9. | "Do You Know?" | J. Dunne; M. Dunne; Perks | 3:48 |
| 10. | "Beauty" | J. Dunne; M. Dunne; Perks | 2:43 |

== Charts and certifications ==
=== Weekly charts ===
| Chart (1989) | Peak position |
|---|---|
| UK Albums (Official Charts) | 5 |

=== Certifications ===
| Region | Certification | Certified units/sales |
|---|---|---|
| United Kingdom (BPI) | Silver | 60,000^{^} |
^{^} Shipments figures based on certification alone.
