= We've Got a Fuzzbox and We're Gonna Use It =

British alternative rock group

We've Got a Fuzzbox and We're Gonna Use It!!
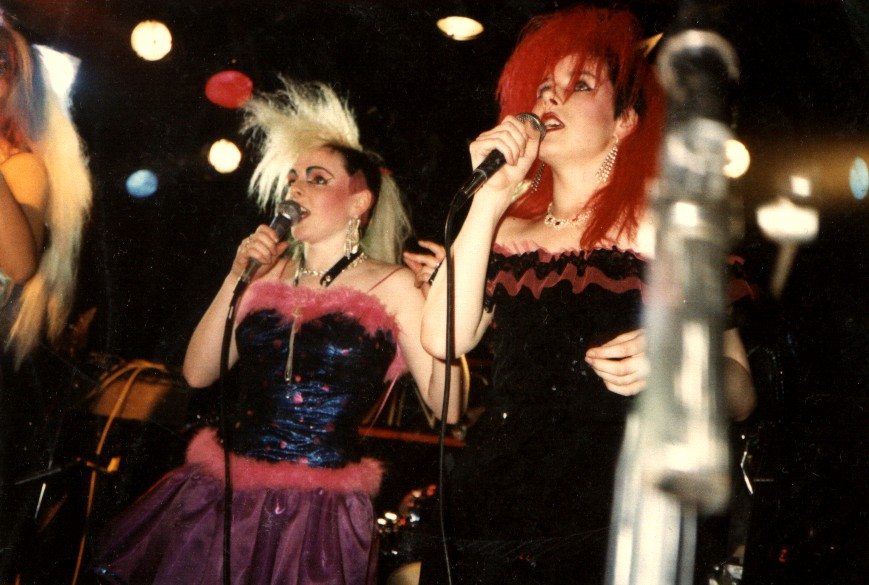
- Fuzzbox performing at the Underground in Croydon, South London, 1986

Background information
- Also known as: Fuzzbox
- Origin: Birmingham, England
- Genres: Alternative rock; pop punk
- Years active: 1985–1990; 2010–2011; 2015–present
- Labels: Vindaloo; Geffen; Warner Bros.; Cherry Red; Gotham
- Members: Vix; Maggie Dunne

We've Got a Fuzzbox and We're Gonna Use It!!, often shortened to Fuzzbox, are a British alternative rock group. Formed in Birmingham in 1985, the all-female quartet originally consisted of Vix (Vickie Perks), Magz (Maggie Dunne), Jo Dunne and Tina O'Neill. The band's name was shortened to Fuzzbox for the US release of their debut studio album. They disbanded in 1990 after releasing two studio albums and reunited in 2010 for a series of concerts. A second reunion was confirmed in 2015.

== Biography ==
The original band members, who were from Moseley, Sheldon and Acocks Green in Birmingham, formed the group in 1985, after Vix met Jo at school. Their name was chosen after they bought a guitar distortion pedal and Maggie Dunne stated: "We've got a fuzzbox and we're gonna use it!"

Their first release, in March 1986, was an EP which included "XX Sex" and "Rules and Regulations", with the fuzzbox featuring prominently, which reached No. 41 on the UK Singles Chart. This proved a huge success for the group: while not reaching the Top 40, the Vindaloo Records release remained in the Indie chart for 25 weeks. This led to tours of the UK and Europe and, in December that year, their debut album, Bostin' Steve Austin, was released (Geffen re-titled the album We've Got a Fuzzbox and We're Gonna Use It upon its US release). This album spawned the band's first Top 40 hit, "Love Is The Slug", and the minor hit "What's The Point".

In the summer of 1986, the band teamed up with their Vindaloo Records labelmates the Nightingales and Ted Chippington to record a single "Rocking with Rita (Head to Toe)". The single, credited to the Vindaloo Summer Special, featured Fuzzbox tackling such classics as "Itsy Bitsy Teenie Weenie Yellow Polka Dot Bikini" on the B-side. Further discussions led to their cover of Norman Greenbaum's hit "Spirit in the Sky", with vocals provided by Magz (Maggie).

The band signed to WEA and, for their next album, Big Bang! (1989), made an abrupt change and reinvented themselves as a slick dance-pop vocal group. The songs "Pink Sunshine", "Fast Forward Futurama" and "International Rescue" were all produced by Andy Richards and co-written by Liam Sternberg. The first three singles from the album, "International Rescue" (UK No. 11), "Pink Sunshine" (UK No. 14) and "Self!" (UK No. 24), all reached the UK Top 30, and a fourth single released from the album, a cover of Yoko Ono's "Walking on Thin Ice", peaked at No. 76. "Self!" also became the group's only charting single in the United States when it peaked at number 16 on the US Billboard Modern Rock chart and number 35 on the US Billboard's Dance Music Club Play chart.

They began work on a new album titled Out Of This World in 1990, but the project was halted after the release of the first single "Your Loss, My Gain" due to 'musical differences'. Perks decided to continue a solo career under the name of Vix, while the other three members left the music industry. They reunited in 2008 and appeared at the Birmingham Pride festival. Previously unreleased material was issued as Fuzz and Nonsense and From Rules and Regulations to Pink Sunshine, featuring tracks originally slated for Out Of This World. An album was later released of their two radio sessions for John Peel and sessions for Janice Long's show, titled Love Is a Slug: Complete BBC Sessions. Peel Show listeners voted "Rules and Regulations" number 31 in the Festive Fifty in 1986.

In October 2004 a compilation of Fuzzbox singles and alternative mixes, titled Look At The Hits On That, was released – together with a DVD of their promotional videos, most of which were publicly unavailable until that release.

== Television appearances ==
TV appearances by the group include MTV, Going Live, Jim'll Fix It, The Old Grey Whistle Test, and eight performances on Top of the Pops. Fuzzbox performed "Pink Sunshine" on Ghost Train on a sunny Saturday morning in 1989; halfway through their performance, their backing tape rewound and started again.

== Reunion ==
Early in 2010, Fuzzbox announced their reunion, returning as a quintet without drummer Tina O'Neill. A 13-date UK tour took place in May, along with a new single and video, a cover of M's "Pop Muzik", released through Gotham Records and iTunes on 17 May.

On 25 September 2010, Fuzzbox headlined at the Shifnal Festival; on 25 March 2011, they played at the Whitby Gothic Weekend. The latter was this reunion's last gig, the project disbanding shortly afterwards.

Guitarist Jo Dunne died aged 43 on 26 October 2012, six weeks after being diagnosed with cancer.

== Second reunion ==
In July 2015, Fuzzbox appeared on BBC Radio 2 with Sara Cox to confirm a second reunion. On 9 September, it was confirmed that Megan Burke, Sarit Black and Hannah Layhe had joined the band on guitar, bass and drums respectively. The new lineup played a comeback gig at the 100 Club in London on 13 November 2015. In 2016, they announced the release of a new single and video, "Let's Go Supernova!", and a UK tour in December with the Wonder Stuff.

In March 2022, the band announced the release of We've Got a Fuzzbox and We're Going to Use It – Reimagined/Reimagined Too: The Best of Fuzzbox Reimagined, an album of re-recorded and reworked material from their back catalogue featuring guest spots from soul singer Melanie Williams and Happy Monday's official tour DJ Vince Vega. It was produced by Blockheads frontman, and producer of the Fall, Mike Bennett

== Solo work ==
Fuzzbox lead singer Vix joined Ginger of the Wildhearts' supergroup Ginger & The Sonic Circus along with guitarist/ producer Jason Edwards (Wolfsbane), Jon Poole (The Wildhearts/Cardiacs) and Conny Bloom (Hanoi Rocks). They headlined the Gibson/MySpace stage at the 2006 Download festival and did several dates in the U.S and Japan as well as a couple of UK tours before The Wildhearts eventually reformed, putting further plans on hold.

Vix also released an 11-track album in 2008, LovePower and Peace, on Damage Control Music. The album features nine original tracks along with re-workings of two Fuzzbox songs, "Your Loss, My Gain" and "You", and was co-written and produced by Robin George.

Vix recorded a further EP called "Seduction Songs" on Fierce Kitten Records with Robin George, Pete Haycock (Climax Blues Band), Mark Sheppard (the Offering), Mel Collins (Bryan Ferry/ King Crimson/ Meat Loaf), Jacquie Williams (Sister Sledge), Joy Shannon (Joy Shannon and the Beauty Marks, The Birmingham Women in Music and the LovePower & Peace Kids Choir in 2013).

Vix released a gospel-tinged pop single called "Believe Me" with the Offering in 2014.

== ViX n The Kix/Vix & Her MsChiefs ==
ViX n The Kix was a musical project initiated in 2007 by Vix. Ruckus magazine described ViX n The Kix's music as "a retro lashing of slick Fifties glamour and flirty burlesque...alternates between fun, punk-inspired blasts of guitar-powered pop to lush, emotive ballads – influences taking in everything from No Doubt through Garbage to Roxy Music and The Pretenders." The project ended when Vix announced the reunion of Fuzzbox in 2010.

In late 2011, following the end of the first Fuzzbox reunion, Vix – temporarily reverting to her real name, Victoria Perks – announced the formation of her new Americana / New Country project, The Victoria Perks Band.

In 2014, she formed her current all-girl Americana band called ViX & her MsChiefs, releasing an EP.

== Band members ==
=== Current ===
- Vix (Victoria Perks) – vocals (1985–present)
- Maggie Dunne – keyboard, bass (1985–present)
- Megan Burke – guitar (2015–present)
- Sarit Black – bass (2015–present)
- Jules Layhe – drums (2015–present)

=== Former ===
- Jo Dunne – guitar (1985–1990, 2010–2011)
- Tina O'Neill – drums (1985–1990)
- Sarah Firebrand – bass (2010–2011)
- Karen Milne – drums (2010–2011)

== Discography ==
=== Albums ===
- Bostin' Steve Austin (1986), Vindaloo Records^{1}
- Big Bang! (1989), Warner Bros. - UK No. 5
- We’ve Got a Fuzzbox and We’re Going to Use It – Reimagined/Reimagined Too: The Best of Fuzzbox Reimagined (2022), Pagster Music Via Gonzo Media^{2}

^{1} Bostin' Steve Austin was released as We've Got a Fuzzbox and We're Gonna Use It in the US by Geffen Records in 1987. ^{2} An album of re-recorded songs from Fuzzbox's back catalogue

=== Compilations ===
- Fuzz and Nonsense (2000), Cherry Red
- Rules & Regulations to Pink Sunshine: Fuzzbox Story (2001), Cherry Red
- Look at the Hits on That (2004), WSM
- Love Is a Slug: Complete BBC Sessions (2005), Cherry Red

=== Singles and EPs ===
Year	Single	Peak positions				Album
Year	Single	UK	IRE	US Dance	US Altern.	Album
1986	Rules and Regulations EP ^{1} "X X Sex", "Do I Want To?", "Rules & Regulations", "She"	41	—	—	—	Bostin' Steve Austin
1986	"Rockin' with Rita (Head to Toe)" (as part of The Vindaloo Summer Special)	56	—	—	—	Single only
1986	Love Is the Slug EP "Love Is the Slug", "Console Me", "Spirit in the Sky", "Justine"	31	—	—	—	Bostin' Steve Austin
1987	"What's the Point" ^{2}	51	—	—	—	Bostin' Steve Austin
1989	"International Rescue"	11	20	—	—	Big Bang!
1989	"Pink Sunshine"	14	24	—	—	Big Bang!
1989	"Self!"	24	—	35	16	Big Bang!
1989	"Walking on Thin Ice"	76	—	—	—	Big Bang!
1990	"Your Loss My Gain" ^{3}	100	—	—	—	Singles only
2010	"Pop Muzik" (digital only)	—	—	—	—	Singles only
2016	"Let's Go Supernova"	—	—	—	—	Singles only
2018	"WGAF…. AWGUI!"	—	—	—	—	Singles only
"—" denotes releases that did not chart or were ineligible.

- ^{1} Rules and Regulations also peaked at number 1 on UK Indie Chart
- ^{2} "What's the Point" contains a cover of Queen's "Bohemian Rhapsody"
- ^{3} "Your Loss My Gain" (limited release)

=== Music videos ===
Year	Video	Director
1986	"Rules and Regulations"	Nick Small
1986	"Love Is the Slug"	Nick Small
1986	"Rockin' with Rita (Head to Toe)"	
1987	"What's the Point?"	John Mills
1989	"International Rescue"	Adrian Edmondson
1989	"Self!"	Johnny Popps
1989	"Walking on Thin Ice"	Howard Greenhalgh
1989	"Pink Sunshine"	Johnny Popps
1990	"Your Loss My Gain"	Klaus Witting
2010	"Pop Muzik"	Gabe Crozier
2016	"Let's Go Supernova"	
2018	"WGAF... AWGU!!"	
2019	"Say Hello"	Robert Walsh-Lawrence
