= Oot & Aboot =

Studio album by Real McKenzies
- Released: May 20, 2003
- Recorded: January–February 2003
- Studio: Motor Studios, San Francisco, California
- Genre: Celtic punk
- Length: 27:56
- Label: Honest Don's

Real McKenzies chronology
Pissed Tae Th' Gills (2002)	Oot & Aboot (2003)	10,000 Shots (2005)

Professional ratings
Review scores
Source	Rating
AllMusic	3/5 stars

Oot & Aboot is the fourth album by the band Real McKenzies, released in 2003.

== Track listing ==
1. "Cross the Ocean"
2. "Droppin' Like Flies"
3. "Ye Banks and Braes"
4. "Get Lost"
5. "Lest We Forget"
6. "Heather Bells"
7. "Dance Around the Whisky"
8. "Oot & Aboot"
9. "Shit Outta Luck"
10. "Jennifer Que"
11. "Drink the Way I Do"
12. "The Night the Lights Went Out in Scotland"
13. "Taylor Made"
