= Clash of the Tartans =

Studio album by The Real McKenzies
- Released: 1998
- Genre: Celtic punk
- Length: 40:22
- Label: Sudden Death

The Real McKenzies chronology
Real McKenzies (1995)	Clash of the Tartans (1998)	Loch'd and Loaded (2001)

Professional ratings
Review scores
Source	Rating
Allmusic	3/5 stars

Clash of the Tartans is the second album by the band The Real McKenzies, originally released in 1998 (see 1998 in music). "Mainland" was the selected single, with an accompanying video directed by Danny Novak.

== Track listing ==
1. "Stone of Kings" (Real McKenzies, Walker) – 2:35
2. "Thistle Boy" (Priske, Real McKenzies ...) – 2:29
3. "Mainland" (Walker) – 3:56
4. "Kings o' Glasgow" (Chapman, Real McKenzies ...) – 3:24
5. "Will Ye Be Proud" (MacLeod) – 2:38
6. "Ceilidh" (McKenzie) – 2:28
7. "Wild Mountain Thyme" (Francis McPeake) – 1:45
8. "Pagan Holiday" (Walker) – 3:43
9. "Scots Wha' Ha'e" (Burns, Priske, Walker) – 2:53
10. "Bastards" (McKenzie, Robertson) – 2:30
11. "McPherson's Rant" (Robert Burns, Real McKenzies) – 2:56
12. "To the Battle" (McKenzies, Walker) – 3:46
13. "Auld Lang Syne" (Robert Burns) – 2:11
14. "MacLeod" (Macleod) – 2:57

== Personnel ==
- Brian "Who" Else – Engineer
- Randy "Tex" Iwata – Layout Design, Cover Design
- Paul McKenzie – Vocals
- Kurt Robertson - Guitars
- Rich Priske - Bass
- Anthony "Tony Balony" Walker - Guitars L.Vocal on Mainland, Will ye be Proud
- Glenn Kruger "McKruger" – Drums
- Alan MacLeod – Bagpipes, Spoken Word
- Mike MacDonald – Bagpipes
- Shannon Saunders – Accordion, Backing Vocals (Mainland)
- Alex Waterhouse-Hayward – Cover Photo
- Neil Williams – Assistant Engineer
