= Loch'd and Loaded =

Loch'd & Loaded

Studio album by The Real McKenzies
- Released: September 4, 2001
- Recorded: 2001
- Genre: Celtic punk
- Length: 31:06
- Label: Honest Don's

The Real McKenzies chronology
Clash of the Tartans (2000)	Loch'd & Loaded (2001)	Pissed Tae Th' Gills (2002)

Professional ratings
Review scores
Source	Rating
Allmusic	link

Loch'd & Loaded is the third album by the band The Real McKenzies, released in 2001.

== Track listing ==
1. "Nessie" (Boland, McKenzie, Robertson) – 3:09
2. "Raise the Banner" (Boland, McKenzie, Robertson) – 2:08
3. "Lassie / Roamin' in the Gloamin'" (Lauder) – 1:47
4. "Pickled" (McKenzie, Robertson) - :53
5. "Memories of Old Pa Fogerty" (Campbell) - :42
6. "Wild Cattieyote" (McKenzie, Robertson) – 2:07
7. "Whiskey Scotch Whiskey" (Boland, McKenzie, Robertson) – 1:56
8. "Scots 'Round the World" (McKenzie, Robertson) – 2:33
9. "Bitch Off the Money" (Boland, McKenzie) – 2:07
10. "Gi' Us a Dram" (Boland, McKenzie) – 2:36
11. "Donald Where's Yer Troosers" (MacFadyen, Stewart) – 1:22
12. "Flower of Scotland" (Traditional) – 1:23
13. "Swords of a Thousand Men" (Tudorpole) – 2:23
14. "Bonnie Mary" (Traditional) – 1:04
15. "Ballad of John Silver" (Boland, Lambert, Maefield, McKenzie) – 2:22
16. "Death of a Space Piper" (Coppins) – 1:26
