= Concert Classics (Strawbs album) =

Live album by Strawbs
- Released: 1999
- Recorded: 1977
- Genre: Progressive rock
- Label: Renaissance

Strawbs chronology
Halcyon Days (1997)	Concert Classics (1999)	The Complete Strawbs (2000)

Concert Classics is a live album by English band Strawbs. It was recorded in 1977 and broadcast in February 1978 as part of the BBC TV series "Sight and Sound".

== Track listing ==
1. "The Last Resort" (Dave Cousins, Dave Lambert, Chas Cronk)
2. "Ghosts" (Cousins)
  "Sweet Dreams"
  "Night Light"
  "Guardian Angel"
  "Night Light"
3. "No Return" (Cousins, Lambert)
4. "Heartbreaker" (Lambert)
5. "Simple Visions" (Cousins, Cronk)
6. "Cut Like a Diamond" (Cousins, Cronk)
7. "Out in the Cold/Round and Round" (Cousins)
8. "Hero and Heroine" (Cousins)

== Personnel ==
- Dave Cousins – vocals, acoustic guitar
- Dave Lambert – vocals, electric guitar
- Chas Cronk – bass guitar, acoustic guitar, vocals
- Tony Fernandez – drums
- Andy Richards – keyboards

== Release history ==
Region	Date	Label	Format	Catalog
United Kingdom	1999	Renaissance	CD	RRCC00706
