= New World (Strawbs song) =

Song by Strawbs

from the album Grave New World
- Released: February 1972
- Recorded: November 1971
- Genre: Progressive rock
- Length: 4:11
- Label: A&M
- Songwriter(s): Dave Cousins
- Producer(s): Strawbs

"New World" is a song by English band Strawbs written by Dave Cousins. The track first appeared on the Grave New World album.

== Lyrical and musical content ==
The song is very much a companion piece of "The Hangman and the Papist" from the previous album From the Witchwood. It tells of conflict and divided families and, like the earlier song, was prompted by the troubles in Northern Ireland.

This is perhaps the first song from the band that could be described as progressive in instrumentation and arrangement, in particular the prominent mellotron brass and strings.

== Release history ==
The song was released as a single in Japan instead of "Benedictus", which was relegated to the B-side.

Region	Date	Label	Format	Catalog
Japan	1972	A&M Records	7" single	AM 135

== Personnel ==
- Dave Cousins – vocals, acoustic guitar
- Tony Hooper – acoustic guitar
- Blue Weaver – Mellotron
- John Ford – bass guitar
- Richard Hudson – drums
