= Two Devils Will Talk =

Studio album by The Real McKenzies
- Released: March 3, 2017
- Recorded: Jeremy Patch, Karl Dicaire, Kieran Wagstaff, Spencer Bleasdale
- Studio: Atlantis Sound, Armoury Studios, Fader Mountain Sound
- Genre: Celtic punk
- Length: 36:15
- Label: Fat Wreck Chords

The Real McKenzies chronology
Rats in the Burlap (2015)	Two Devils Will Talk (2017)	Beer and Loathing (2020)

Professional ratings
Review scores
Source	Rating
Punknews.org	3.5/5 stars
Folk-Metal.nl	8/10 stars
CrypticRock	3.5/5 stars
New Noise Magazine	4/5 stars

Two Devils Will Talk is the ninth studio album by Canadian Celtic punk band The Real McKenzies. The album was released on 3 March 2017 by Fat Wreck Chords in the United States and by Stomp Records in Canada. Two Devils Will Talk was made available for streaming online a week before the physical release of the album.

== Track listing ==
No.	Title	Length
1.	"Due West"	2:38
2.	"Weyburn"	2:13
3.	"One Day"	2:43
4.	"Seafarers"	2:56
5.	"Northwest Passage"	3:59
6.	"Float"	2:22
7.	"One Man Voyage"	2:21
8.	"Sail Again"	2:26
9.	"The Town"	2:31
10.	"Pedals"	2:30
11.	"Drunkards Lament"	2:28
12.	"Fuck The Real McKenzies"	1:46
13.	"The Comeback"	2:26
14.	"Scots Wha Ha’e"	2:56
