= Hey Tuttie Tatie =

Traditional Scots air

"Hey Tuttie Tatie" (also "Hey Tutie Teti" or "Hey Tuttie Taiti") is a traditional Scots air. Its age is unknown, though it is reputed to have been played by the army of Robert the Bruce before the Battle of Bannockburn in 1314 and during the Siege of Orléans in 1429 (when France and Scotland allied).

The tune to "Hey Tuttie Tatie" has been used as the basis for several other songs, with new lyrics being added. These include "Scots Wha Hae" (1793), "Fill Up Your Bumpers High" (1718) and "Bridekirk's Hunting". The tune was also used in the concert overture Rob Roy by Hector Berlioz, and the Scottish Fantasy by Max Bruch.

The title is supposed to imitate a trumpet, and is likely based upon a trumpet motif rather than a trumpet tune.
