= Priske =

Priske is a surname. Notable people with the surname include:

- August Priske (born 2004), Danish soccer player
- Brian Priske (born 1977), Danish soccer player
- Rich Priske (1967–2020), Canadian bassist
