= 10,000 Shots =

Studio album by The Real McKenzies
- Released: August 23, 2005
- Recorded: 2005
- Genre: Celtic punk
- Length: 30:03
- Label: Fat Wreck Chords

The Real McKenzies chronology
Oot & Aboot (2003)	10,000 Shots (2005)	Off the Leash (2008)

Professional ratings
Review scores
Source	Rating
Allmusic	3.5/5 stars

10,000 Shots is the fifth album by Scottish-Canadian celtic punk band The Real McKenzies, recorded and released in 2005.

== Track listing ==
No.	Title	Length
1.	"Smokin' Bowl"	3:05
2.	"Best Day Until Tomorrow"	2:46
3.	"Will Ye No Come Back Again?"	1:59
4.	"Pour Decisions"	2:36
5.	"I Hate My Band"	2:16
6.	"Farewell to Nova Scotia"	2:09
7.	"Bugger Off"	2:02
8.	"10,000 Shots"	2:20
9.	"13"	2:38*
10.	"The Skeleton and the Tailor"	2:03*
11.	"Comin' Thro' the Rye"	1:38
12.	"The Ale is Dear"	1:22
13.	"The Catalpa"	3:03
