= Wild Mountain Thyme =

Folk song written by Francis McPeake

- Folk song
- Other name: "Purple Heather" "Will Ye Go, Lassie, Go?"
- Genre: Scottish folk music Irish traditional music
- Language: English
- Based on: "The Braes of Balquhither" by Robert Tannahill "The Braes o' Bowhether" (traditional)
- Recorded: 1957 (as "Wild Mountain Thyme")

"Wild Mountain Thyme" (also known as "Purple Heather", "Blooming Heather," and "Will Ye Go, Lassie, Go?") is a Scottish/Irish folk song. The lyrics and melody are a variant of the song "The Braes of Balquhither" by Scottish poet Robert Tannahill (1774–1810) and Scottish composer Robert Archibald Smith (1780–1829), but were adapted by Belfast musician Francis McPeake (1885–1971) into "Wild Mountain Thyme" and first recorded by his family in the 1950s.

Tannahill's original song, first published in Robert Archibald Smith's Scottish Minstrel (1821–1824), is about the hills (braes) around Balquhidder near Lochearnhead. Tannahill collected and adapted traditional songs, and "The Braes of Balquhither" may have been based on the traditional song "The Braes o' Bowhether".

== History ==
The Wild Mountain Thyme
"Wild Mountain Thyme" performed by Christoph Nolte

The existing tune of "Wild Mountain Thyme" is significantly different from Tannahill's "The Braes of Balquhither", which was most likely based on a traditional air. In an 1854 publication, George Farquhar Graham notes that Tannahill's song was set to the air "Bochuiddar" (Balquidder), as found in Captain Simon Fraser's Collection of Melodies of the Highlands and Islands of Scotland (1816). Other scholars suggest the melody is based on an old Scottish traditional tune "The Three Carls o' Buchanan".

McPeake is said to have dedicated the song to his first wife, but his son wrote an additional verse in order to celebrate his father's remarriage. "Wild Mountain Thyme" was first recorded by McPeake's nephew, also named Francis McPeake, in 1957 for the BBC series As I Roved Out.

The song was gifted to Maggi Peirce, originally of Belfast, by Francis McPeake in 1947. Peirce immigrated to the U.S. in the 1960s and in 1967 took on the running of Tryworks Coffee House, a hub of folk music and culture in New Bedford, Massachusetts. "Wild Mountain Thyme" was sung every Saturday night at Tryworks, popularising the song to folk music lovers who attended the coffee house.

While Francis McPeake held the copyright to the song, it is generally believed that rather than writing the song, he arranged an existing travelling folk version and popularised the song as his father's. When interviewed on radio, Francis McPeake said it was based on a song he heard whilst travelling in Scotland, and he rewrote it later. Bob Dylan's recording of the song cited it as traditional, with the arranger unknown, though Dylan's copyright records indicate that the song is sometimes "attributed to" McPeake.

The song was the subject of an episode of BBC Radio 4's Soul Music, first broadcast in September 2026.

== Lyrics ==
The original version of the song, published in 1957, closely paraphrases the Tannahill version, which was published posthumously in 1822. Tannahill's original lyrics include a number of phrases that McPeake carried over into his song, including the lines "Let us go, lassie, go" and "And the wild mountain thyme" as he rewrote the song.

In her book Fragrance and Wellbeing: Plant Aromatics and Their Influence on the Psyche, author Jennifer Peace Rhind describes "Wild Mountain Thyme" as essentially a love song, with the line, "Wild Mountain Thyme grows among the Scottish heather" perhaps being an indirect reference to the old custom of young women wearing a sprig of thyme (Thymus praecox), mint or lavender to attract a suitor. Rhind also notes that, in British folklore, the thyme plant was the fairies' playground and often the herb would be left undisturbed for their use. William Shakespeare made use of this same lore in A Midsummer Night's Dream. Oberon describes the bower where his queen Titania sleeps: "I know a bank where the wild thyme blows, Where oxlips and the nodding violet grows, Quite overcanopied with luscious woodbine, With sweet muskroses, and with eglantine."

== Recordings ==
The following is a chronological list of recordings of the song.

- Alma Gluck recording of "The Braes o' Balquhidder" (1914).
- Francis McPeake for the BBC series As I Roved Out (1957)
- David Hammond on I Am the Wee Falorie Man (1958)
- Sandy Paton on Many Sides of Sandy Paton (1959)
- The McPeake Family on McPeake Family of Belfast (1961)
- Bonnie Dobson (as "Will Ye Go Laddie Go") on The First Time (1961)
- Judy Collins on A Maid of Constant Sorrow (1961)
- Robin Hall and Jimmie MacGregor on Two Heids Are Better Than Yin! (1962)
- The Clancy Brothers (as "Will Ye Go, Lassie, Go?") on The Boys Won't Leave the Girls Alone (1962), Live on St. Patrick's Day (1973), and Reunion (1984), and the video/DVD Farewell to Ireland (1996)
- The Courriers on Carry On (1963)
- Paul Clayton on Folk Singer (1965)
- Joan Baez on Farewell, Angelina (1965)
- The New Christy Minstrels (as "Go, Lassie, Go") on Wandering Minstrels (1965)
- Lee Mallory on unreleased recording with producer Curt Boettcher & The Ballroom (1966), later released on Mallory's collections That's the Way It's Gonna Be and Many Are the Times (2003)
- The Byrds on Fifth Dimension (1966)
- Marianne Faithfull on North Country Maid (1966)
- The Corries on The Corries: In Concert (1969)
- Nana Mouskouri on Turn on the Sun (1970)
- Long John Baldry on Everything Stops for Tea (1972)
- The Alexander Brothers on Married by the Bible (1972)
- Van Morrison (as "Purple Heather") on Hard Nose the Highway (1973)
- Strawbs (as "Will You Go") on the B Side of the single Part of the Union (1973), Bursting at the Seams (Bonus Track) and Halcyon Days
- Brenda Wootton and Robert Bartlett (as Brenda and Robert) on Tin in the Stream (1974)
- Buddy Emmons on Steel Guitar (1975)
- Thin Lizzy on Black Rose: A Rock Legend; arrangement by Gary Moore and Phil Lynott (1979)
- George Hamilton IV on Forever Young (1979)
- Bert Jansch on Heartbreak (1982)
- Marianne Faithfull on North Country Maid Faithfull Sings Folk Songs (1983)
- Rick Stanley on On English Hills (1983)
- Bernadette on Back on the Road Again (1984)
- Penelope Houston on Birdboys (1987)
- The Tannahill Weavers on Dancing Feet (1987)
- Nigel & the Crosses on Time Between – A Tribute to The Byrds (1989)
- Nancy Cassidy on Kid Songs Jubilee (1990)
- Michal Hromek (one vocal and two instrumental versions) on The Wild Mountain Thyme (1990)
- Denis Ryan, as "Will You Go Lassie Go" on Mist Covered Mountains (1991)
- Meg Davis on Meg Davis Live at Dennos (1992)
- Tommy Makem, Barley Bree, Cherish the Ladies, and Ronnie D'addario (as "Go Lassie Go") on Tommy Makem and Friends in Concert (1992)
- Glenn Frey on Glenn Frey Live (1993)
- The Silencers on So Be It (1994) and Real (2008)
- Jim Diamond on Sugarolly Days (1994)
- Viva Brother (as "Will You Go") on Pipe Dreams (1994)
- Dick Gaughan, Emmylou Harris, Kate & Anna McGarrigle and Rufus Wainwright on "Transatlantic Sessions" (1995)
- Rod Stewart (as "Purple Heather") on A Spanner in the Works (1995)
- The Irish Rovers on The Irish Rovers' Gems (1996)
- John McDermott on When I Grow Too Old to Dream (1997)
- Lisa Lynne on Quiet Heart (1997)
- Real McKenzies on Clash of the Tartans (2000)
- The Masterless Men on Back on Track (2000)
- Mark Knopfler on A Shot at Glory (2001)
- Enter the Haggis on Live! (2002)
- Dan Zanes, Friends, Dar Williams on Night Time! (2002)
- Papa M on Three (2003)
- The Chieftains, with Don Williams on Further Down the Old Plank Road (2003)
- Emerald Rose on Celtic Crescent (2003)
- Jim McCann on Ireland's Greatest Love Songs (2003)
- James Taylor on Telluride Bluegrass Festival: Reflections, Vol. 1 (2003)
- Brian Kennedy (as "Will Ye Go Lassie Go") on On Song (2003)
- Albert Kuvezin and Yat-Kha on Re-Covers (2005)
- Amanda on Amanda: Tres (2005)
- Keltik Elektrik with Jim Malcolm on Putumayo Presents Celtic Crossroads (2005)
- Devin Townsend (adaptation/new lyrics) on Synchestra (2006)
- Kate Rusby (as "Blooming Heather") on Awkward Annie (2007)
- Lucy Wainwright Roche on 8 Songs (2007)
- Moira Nelson on Echoes of Another Time (2007)
- Maggie Reilly on Rowan (2007)
- The High Kings (as "Will Ye Go, Lassie Go") on their first, self-titled album (2008)
- Lauren Yason, Richard Fox, and Caroline Dale for the film Stone of Destiny (2008)
- Blake on And So it Goes (2008)
- Fotheringay on Fotheringay 2 (2008)
- Robyn Hitchcock & The Egyptians on Luminous Groove (2008)
- Lark & Spur on Once in France (2008)
- Ronan Keating on Songs for My Mother (2009)
- Robin Pecknold (as White Antelope) (2009)
- Stuart Murdoch recorded the song with another set of lyrics, on the Dark Was the Night compilation (2009)
- The Real McKenzies on Shine Not Burn (2010)
- Marc Gunn, on the album The Bridge (2010)
- Ben Folds on Download for Good (2011)
- Mudmen on Donegal Danny (2012)
- The Rumjacks on Crosses for Eyes (2012)
- The Dolmen on Whispering Winds (2012)
- Marti Pellow, on the album Hope (2013)
- Ed Sheeran, (2013)
- Derek Ryan on The Simple Things (2014)
- 10,000 Maniacs, on the album Twice Told Tales (2015)
- James Taylor, on the album Before This World (2015)
- The Bombadils, on the album, "New Shoes" (2016)
- Michael Head and the Red Elastic Band, on the album Adiós Señor Pussycat (2017)
- The Longest Johns, on the album Between Wind and Water (2018)
- Mungo's Hi Fi ft Cian Finn (as "Go Lassie") (2019)
- Emily Blunt and Jamie Dornan on the soundtrack of the film Wild Mountain Thyme (2020)
- Gerry Rafferty, on the album Rest in Blue (2021)
- Peter Bruntnell, on the album Journey to the Sun (2021)
- Celtic Woman, on the album Postcards from Ireland (2021)
- The Petersens, on the album My Ozark Mountain Home (2022)
- Rufus Wainwright, on the album Folkocracy (2023)
- Ella Roberts, single (2023)
- Faoileán, on the album Far Hills (2023)
- The Golden Tree, a collaboration of Grahame Skinner and Bobby from The Bluebells, on the album Scottish Songs Observed, vol. 1 (2023)
- Mànran, on the single Wild Mountain Thyme (2023)
- Laufey, dodie and Jacob Collier live performance with the National Symphony Orchestra (2024)
- Raffi on the album Penny Penguin (2024)
- Loreena McKennitt on The Road Back Home (2024)
- The Wellermen on the album Northern Sky (2025)
- Lola Kirke, Peter Dreimanis, Brian Dunphy, Darren Holden and Jack O'Connell, on the soundtrack of Ryan Coogler's Sinners (2025)
- Goose, live performance from Providence, RI (2025)

A number of recordings of the song have been made by Bob Dylan. He performed the song in May 1961 in a coffeehouse in Minneapolis. Dylan and Joan Baez performed a duet of the song in the Savoy Hotel, London, on 4 May 1965, which was filmed by D. A. Pennebaker. Dylan performed the song with The Band at the Isle of Wight festival on 31 August 1969. This performance was released in 2013 on the Deluxe Edition of The Bootleg Series Vol. 10: Another Self Portrait (1969–1971). Dylan and Joan Baez sang "Wild Mountain Thyme" together on the 1975 Rolling Thunder Revue tour and two live performances of the song from that tour were released in 2019 on the box set The Rolling Thunder Revue: The 1975 Live Recordings.
