= Here It Comes (song) =

Single by Strawbs
- B-side: "Tomorrow"
- Released: April 1972
- Studio: Morgan Studios,
- Genre: Progressive folk, progressive rock
- Length: 2:42
- Label: A&M
- Songwriter(s): Dave Cousins
- Producer(s): Strawbs

Strawbs singles chronology
"Benedictus" (1971)	"Here It Comes" (1972)	"Lay Down" (1972)

Official audio
- "Here It Comes" on YouTube

"Here It Comes" is a song and 1972 single by the English band Strawbs. It did not appear on any of their studio albums, but it was included on two compilation albums: Strawbs by Choice (1974) and Halcyon Days (1997). Written by bandleader Dave Cousins, "Here It Comes" shows definite pop influences and a more commercial view to song-writing, a trait that would extend to the next single, "Lay Down".

The song was recorded, in middle of the band's early 1972 tour, at Morgan Studios in Willesden, north-west London.

Reviewing the song in 2021, for Louder the War, Ian Canty said: "For me The Strawbs are seldom heard better than on the intoxicating groove of "Here It Comes", a fine amalgam of Bo Diddley beat and "Magic Bus" with added warm organ sounds and crashing guitar breaks."

== B-Side ==
The B-side track "Tomorrow" is taken from the 1972 Grave New World album and is a band composition, although the main lyrical idea is Dave Cousins's and stems from the feelings Cousins had at the decision taken by Rick Wakeman to leave the band at the end of recording the previous album From the Witchwood (1971).

== Personnel ==
- Dave Cousins – lead vocals, acoustic guitar
- Tony Hooper – backing vocals, acoustic guitar, percussion
- John Ford – backing vocals, bass guitar
- Richard Hudson – backing vocals, drums, percussion
- Blue Weaver – keyboards

== Release history ==
Region	Date	Label	Format	Catalog
United Kingdom	April 1972	A&M	7" single	AMS 7002
Germany		A&M	7" single	12155 AT
Italy		A&M	7" single	45032 AT
South Africa	1972	A&M	7" single	AMRS 1020
