= Rats in the Burlap =

Studio album by the Real McKenzies
- Released: August 13, 2015
- Genre: Celtic punk
- Length: 36:21
- Label: Fat Wreck Chords

The Real McKenzies chronology
Westwinds (2012)	Rats in the Burlap (2015)	Two Devils Will Talk (2017)

Professional ratings
Review scores
Source	Rating
AllMusic	3/5 stars
Punknews.org	4/5 stars

Rats in the Burlap is the ninth studio album by Canadian punk rock band the Real McKenzies. It was released on Fat Wreck Chords in 2015.

"Yes" is about the Scottish independence movement.

== Track list ==
No.	Title	Length
1.	"Wha Saw the 42nd"	2:00
2.	"Up on a Motorbike"	2:02
3.	"Who'd a Thought"	3:02
4.	"Midnight Train to Moscow"	1:47
5.	"Lilacs in the Alleyway"	3:29
6.	"Yes"	2:44
7.	"You Wanna Know What"	2:19
8.	"What Have You Done"	2:37
9.	"Bootsy the Haggis-Eating Cat"	2:31
10.	"Spinning Wheels"	1:39
11.	"Stephen's Green"	2:55
12.	"The Fields of Inverness"	3:47
13.	"Catch Me"	2:35
14.	"Dead or Alive"	2:54
