= Ringing Down the Years =

Studio album by Strawbs
- Released: 1991
- Recorded: Spring 1990
- Studio: Parkwood Studios
- Genre: Progressive rock
- Length: 43:19
- Label: Virgin, Road Goes On Forever
- Producer: Stuart Kerrison, Strawbs

Strawbs chronology
Sandy Denny and the Strawbs (1991)	Ringing Down the Years (1991)	A Choice Selection of Strawbs (1992)

Singles from Ringing Down the Years
- 1. "The King"

Ringing Down the Years is the fourteenth studio album by English band Strawbs. The album was released initially only in Canada. Because of the record company's request that a Canadian song be included on the album (in order to facilitate Canadian airplay), the track "Might as Well Be on Mars" written by members of the Pukka Orchestra was included.

The title track was written by leader Dave Cousins about his hearing of the death of former member Sandy Denny.

== Track listing ==
1. "Might as Well Be on Mars" (Graeme Williamson, Neil Chapman) – 4:11
2. "The King" (Dave Cousins) – 3:01
3. "Forever Ocean Blue" (Cousins) – 3:58
4. "Grace Darling" (Cousins) – 6:32
5. "Afraid to Let You Go" (Rod Demick, Richard Hudson, Brian Willoughby) – 3:55
6. "Tell Me What You See in Me" (Cousins) – 6:27
7. "Ringing Down the Years" (Cousins) – 6:57
8. "Stone Cold is the Woman's Heart" (Cousins) – 4:21
9. "Taking a Chance" (Demick, Hudson, Willoughby) – 3:57

== Personnel ==
- Dave Cousins – lead vocals, backing vocals, acoustic guitar
- Tony Hooper – backing vocals, acoustic guitar
- Richard Hudson – lead vocals (track 9), backing vocals, drums, acoustic guitar
- Brian Willoughby – electric guitar
- Chris Parren – keyboards
- Rod Demick – lead vocals (track 5), backing vocals, bass guitar
- Cathy Lesurf - vocals on "The King"

== Recording ==
Recorded at Parkwood Studios, Chalfont St. Giles, England, spring 1990

- Stuart Kerrison, Strawbs – producers
- Stuart Kerrison – engineer

== Release history ==
Region	Date	Label	Format	Catalog	Comments
Canada	1991	Virgin	CD	CDV 3031	
United Kingdom	1998	Road Goes on Forever	2-CD set	RGF/WC DCD039	released together with Don't Say Goodbye
