= Scottish Fantasy =

Composition for violin and orchestra by Max Bruch

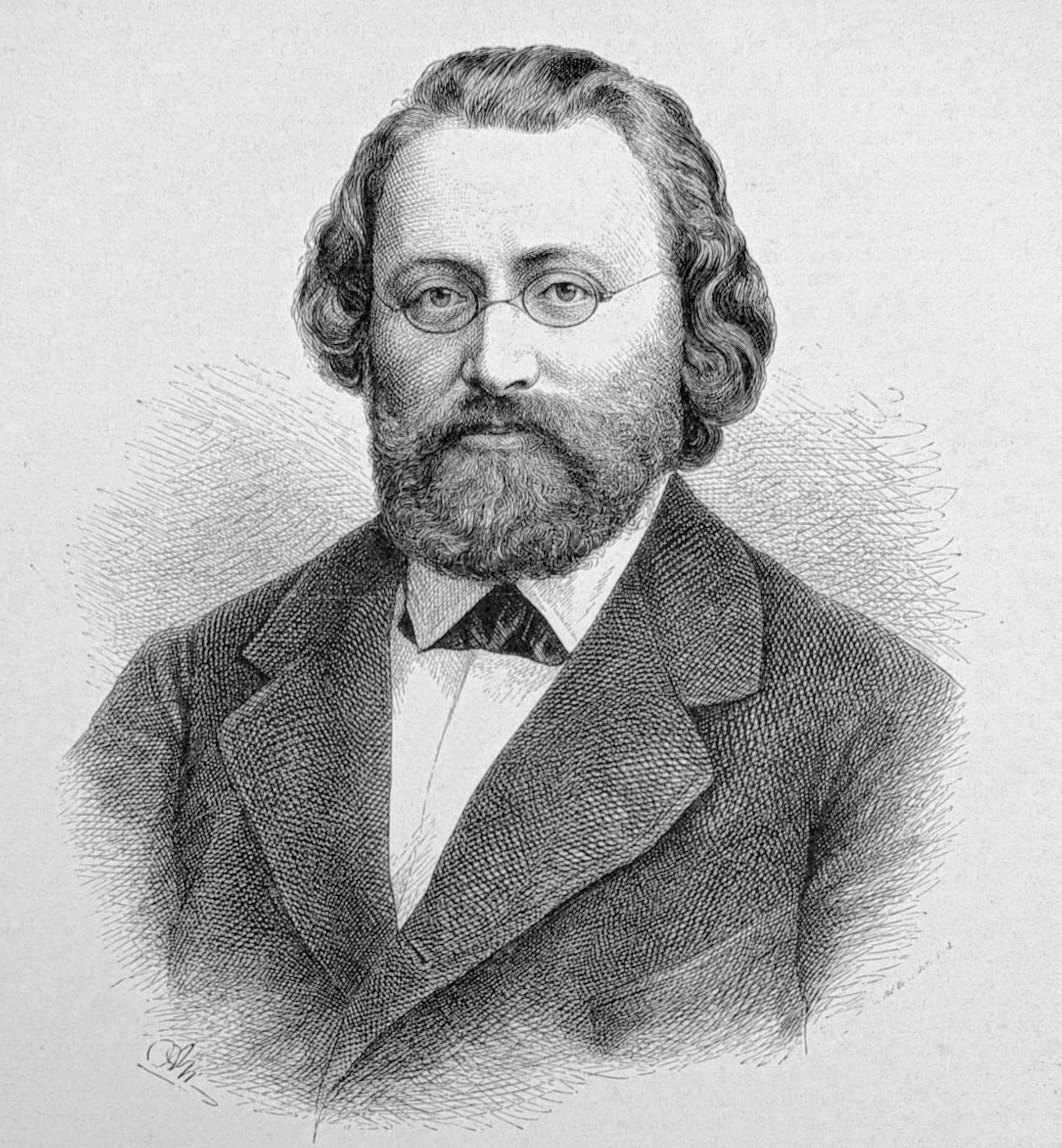
The composer Max Bruch (portrait by Adolf Neumann, 1881)

The Scottish Fantasy in E♭ minor (German: Fantasie für die Violine mit Orchester und Harfe unter freier Benutzung schottischer Volksmelodien), Op. 46, is a composition for violin and orchestra by Max Bruch. The composition is a four-movement fantasy on Scottish folk melodies. Bruch dedicated the piece for the virtuoso violinist Pablo de Sarasate.

Although Bruch visited Scotland for the first time only a year after the premiere of the work, he had access to a collection of Scottish music at Munich Library in 1868. In paying homage to Scottish tradition, the work gives a prominent place to the harp in the instrumental accompaniment to the violin. The Scottish Fantasy is one of several signature pieces by Bruch that is still widely heard today.

== Description ==
The Scottish Fantasy in E♭ minor (German: Fantasie für die Violine mit Orchester und Harfe unter freier Benutzung schottischer Volksmelodien), Op. 46, is a composition for violin and orchestra by Max Bruch. He composed and dedicated the piece for the virtuoso violinist Pablo de Sarasate.

The work is a fantasy on Scottish folk melodies. The first movement is built on "Through the Wood Laddie". This tune also appears at the end of the second and fourth movements. The second movement is built around "The Dusty Miller", the third on "I'm A' Doun for Lack O' Johnnie", and the fourth movement includes a sprightly arrangement of "Hey Tuttie Tatie", the tune in the patriotic anthem "Scots Wha Hae" (with lyrics by the Scottish poet Robert Burns).

Although Bruch visited Scotland for the first time only a year after the premiere of the work, he had access to a collection of Scottish music at Munich Library in 1868. In paying homage to Scottish tradition, the work gives a prominent place to the harp in the instrumental accompaniment to the violin. The Scottish Fantasy is one of several signature pieces by Bruch that is still widely heard today, along with his first violin concerto and Kol Nidrei for cello and orchestra.

== History ==
Bruch premiered the Scottish Fantasy with the Liverpool Philharmonic Society in 1881

Bruch composed the Scottish Fantasy in Berlin during the winter of 1879–1880. Despite the dedication to Sarasate, Joseph Joachim was involved in the fingering and bowing of the solo part. It was published by Simrock as Fantasie: für die Violine mit Orchester und Harfe unter freier Benutzung schottischer Volksmelodien, Op. 46.

The premiere was in Liverpool on 22 February 1881 with Bruch (who was then director of the Liverpool Philharmonic Society) conducting, and Joachim as the soloist. Bruch was unhappy with Joachim’s performance, describing him as having "ruined" the work. When Bruch conducted the work with Sarasate as the soloist at a Philharmonic Society concert in St. James’s Hall on 15 March 1883, it was titled Concerto for Violin (Scotch). At a concert that Bruch conducted in Breslau, also with Sarasate as the soloist, the work was titled Third Violin Concerto (with free use of Scottish melodies, Op. 46).

== Movements ==
The opus consists of four movements:

1. Introduction: Grave – Adagio cantabile
2. Scherzo: Allegro
3. Andante sostenuto
4. Finale: Allegro guerriero

== Instrumentation ==
The work is scored for solo violin, 2 flutes, 2 oboes, 2 clarinets, 2 bassoons, 4 horns, 2 trumpets, 3 trombones, tuba, timpani, bass drum, cymbals, harp, and strings.

== Notable recordings ==
Many famous violinists have recorded the work, including Jascha Heifetz (1947 and 1961), Michael Rabin (1957), David Oistrakh (1962), Kyung Wha Chung (1972), Arthur Grumiaux (1973), Salvatore Accardo (1977), Ruggiero Ricci (live, 1980s), Cho-Liang Lin (1986), Itzhak Perlman (1986), Anne Akiko Meyers (1992), Tasmin Little (1996), Vanessa-Mae (1996), Akiko Suwanai (1997), James Ehnes (2003), Rachel Barton Pine (2004), Aaron Rosand (2007), Nicola Benedetti (2014), Stefan Jackiw (2014), and Joshua Bell (2018).

== Sources ==
- Bruch, Max (1880). Fantasie für die Violine mit Orchester und Harfe, unter freier Benutzung schottischer Volksmelodieen, Op. 46. Berlin: N. Simrock, GmbH.
- Fifield, Christopher (1988). Max Bruch: His Life and Works. New York: G. Braziller Press. ISBN 978-0-8076-1204-0.
- Pine, Rachel Barton (2005). Scottish Fantasies for Violin and Orchestra (CD). Cedille Records. CDR 90000 083. Archived from the original on 2012-02-19.
- Steinberg, Michael (2000). The Concerto: A Listener's Guide. Oxford University Press. ISBN 978-0-19-513931-0.
