= Don't Say Goodbye (album) =

Studio album by Strawbs
- Released: 1987
- Recorded: 1987
- Genre: Soft rock
- Length: 41:05
- Label: Strawberry Hill Productions; EMI Chord
- Producer: Strawbs

Strawbs chronology
The Best of Strawbs (1978)	Don't Say Goodbye (1987)	Preserves Uncanned (1990)

Professional ratings
Review scores
Source	Rating
Allmusic	2/5 stars

Don't Say Goodbye is the thirteenth studio album by English band Strawbs.The album featured material originally recorded for the unreleased album "Heartbreak Hill" using the same arrangements. "Heartbreak Hill" was later released in 1995 eight years after this album was released.

It was the group's first release of new matieral since Deadlines in 1978. It was also their first studio album to feature former members Tony Hooper and Richard Hudson since 1972 and 1973 respectively.

== Track listing ==
Side one

1. "A Boy and his Dog" (Dave Cousins, Chris Parren) – 5:06
2. "Let it Rain" (Cousins, Chas Cronk, Andy Richards) – 4:55
3. "We Can Make it Together" (Cousins, Cronk) – 3:33
4. "Tina Dei Fada" (Richard Hudson) – 3:52
5. "Big Brother" (Hudson) – 3:05

Side two

1. "Something for Nothing" (Cousins, Cronk) – 6:35
2. "Evergreen" (Cousins) – 4:47
3. "That's When the Crying Starts" (Cousins) – 4:06
4. "Beat the Retreat" (Cousins) – 5:06

== Personnel ==
- Dave Cousins – lead vocals, backing vocals, acoustic guitar, electric guitar, banjo
- Tony Hooper – lead vocals (7), backing vocals, acoustic guitar
- Richard Hudson – lead vocals (5), backing vocals, drums, acoustic guitar
- Brian Willoughby – guitars
- Rod Demick – bass guitar, backing vocals
- Chris Parren – keyboards

== Recording ==
Recorded at E-Zee Studios, London and Southern Music Studios, London.

- Strawbs – producers
- Colin Legget – engineer
- Ian Remmer – assistant engineer
- George Peckham – mastering

== Recording history ==
Region	Date	Label	Format	Catalog	Comment
United Kingdom	1987	Strawberry Hill Productions	stereo LP	TOOTS3	
United Kingdom	1987	EMI Chord	stereo LP	Strawbs 1	
Canada	1987	Virgin	stereo LP	VL 3018	
Japan	1987	Alfa	stereo LP	AL1	
	1987	Chord	CD	CD009	
Japan		Alfa	CD	32XB-253	
South Africa		EMI Chord	DAT	STRAWBSDAT1	
	1998	Road Goes on Forever	CD	RGF/WC DCD039	
