= Lay Down (Strawbs song) =

Single by Strawbs

from the album Bursting at the Seams
- B-side: "Backside"
- Released: 1972
- Genre: Progressive folk, progressive rock
- Length: 4:31
- Label: A&M
- Songwriter: Dave Cousins
- Producer: Strawbs

Strawbs singles chronology
"Here It Comes" (1972)	"Lay Down" (1972)	"Part of the Union" (1973)

Official audio
- "Lay Down" on YouTube

"Lay Down" is a single by the Strawbs which reached No. 12 in the UK Singles Chart in October 1972 - their first hit. It was included on their 1973 album Bursting at the Seams.

The lyrics are loosely based on the 23rd Psalm in the Old Testament and the song was widely considered to be writer Dave Cousins's most commercial and radio-friendly offering to date. Indeed, some aficionados accused Cousins and the band of "selling out", especially as the band later appeared on Top of the Pops dressed in glittery "glam rock" outfits and wearing make-up (with drummer Richard Hudson unusually placed at the front of the stage).

The single was described, in the original A&M Records Press Release, as ".. the Strawbs first real attempt to crack open the singles market." It featured strong rock guitar riffs from the band's new guitarist Dave Lambert. The album version features an additional guitar solo, making it about 30 seconds longer than the single. The song unusually also features mellotron choir parts.

The song was brought to the public's attention again in 2007 when it featured on the BBC television series Life on Mars. It was, however, unaccountably absent from the DVD boxset soundtrack.

== B-side ==
The B-side "Backside" is attributed to "Ciggy Barlust and the Whales from Venus", an obvious allusion to David Bowie's "Ziggy Stardust and the Spiders from Mars".

It was actually a Strawbs composition credited to all members of the band at that time.

== Other recordings ==
The song was re-recorded (with different personnel) for the 2003 Strawbs album Blue Angel and also the 1979 Dave Cousins and Brian Willoughby album Old School Songs.

== Personnel ==
- Dave Cousins – lead vocals, electric guitar
- Dave Lambert – lead guitar, backing vocals
- John Ford – bass guitar, backing vocals
- Blue Weaver – mellotron
- Richard Hudson – drums, backing vocals
