= Bursting at the Seams =

Studio album by Strawbs
- Released: 26 January 1973
- Recorded: October–December 1972
- Genre: Progressive rock
- Length: 40:29
- Labels: A&M, (UK)
- Producer: Strawbs

Strawbs chronology
Grave New World (1972)	Bursting at the Seams (1973)	All Our Own Work (1973)

Singles from Bursting at the Seams
- 1. "Lay Down"; 2. "Part of the Union"

Professional ratings
Review scores
Source	Rating
Allmusic	4.5/5 stars
Encyclopedia of Popular Music	3/5 stars

Bursting at the Seams is the fifth studio album by the English band Strawbs, released on 26 January 1973 by A&M Records. It was the first album to be released after the departure of founder member Tony Hooper and the recruitment of Dave Lambert. It contains their two most successful singles and peaked at No. 2 in the UK Album Chart and No. 65 in Canada.

== Track listing ==
Side one

1. "Flying" (Dave Cousins) – 4:49
2. "Lady Fuschia" (Richard Hudson, John Ford) – 3:59
3. "Stormy Down" (Cousins) – 2:45
4. "Down by the Sea" (Cousins) – 6:17
5. "The River" (Cousins) – 2:21

"Down by the Sea" is placed after "The River" on the 1998 CD to replicate the order the songs were regularly played in concert.

Side two

1. "Part of the Union" (Hudson, Ford) – 2:54
2. "Tears and Pavan" – 6:35
  "Tears" (Cousins)
  "Pavan" (Cousins, Hudson, Ford)
3. "The Winter and the Summer" (Dave Lambert) – 4:07
4. "Lay Down" (Cousins) – 4:31
5. "Thank You" (Blue Weaver, Cousins) – 2:11

Bonus tracks - A&M 1998 remastered CD

1. "Will You Go" (aka "Wild Mountain Thyme") (Francis McPeake) – 3:54
2. "Backside" (Cousins, Hudson, Ford, Lambert, Weaver) – 3:49
3. "Lay Down" (Single version) (Cousins) – 3:33

== Personnel ==
- Dave Cousins – lead vocals, backing vocals, acoustic guitar, electric guitar, banjo
- Dave Lambert – lead vocals, backing vocals, acoustic guitar, electric guitar
- Blue Weaver – organ, piano, mellotron
- John Ford – lead vocals, backing vocals, bass guitar
- Richard Hudson – backing vocals, drums, sitar

== Recording ==
- Strawbs – Producers
- Tom Allom – Engineer

Recorded at Sound Techniques, the Manor and Morgan Studios

== Charts ==
Chart (1973)	Peak position
Canada Top Albums/CDs (RPM)	64
UK Albums (Official Charts)	2
US Billboard 200	121

== Release history ==
Region	Date	Label	Format	Catalogue
United Kingdom	1973	A&M	stereo LP	AMLH 68144
United States	1973	A&M	stereo LP	SP 4383
Canada	1973	A&M	stereo LP & cassette	SP 4383 / CS 4383
Germany, Italy	1973	A&M	stereo LP	A&M 86 658
Denmark	1973	Sonet/Dansk Grammafon	stereo LP	SLPS 1544
United Kingdom	1973	A&M	cassette	ZCAM 68144
West Germany	1988	A&M	CD	394383-2
Worldwide	1998	A&M	remastered CD (3 bonus tracks)	540 936-2
Japan	2002	A&M	remastered CD (3 bonus tracks)	UICY-9215
