= Shine Not Burn =

Live album by The Real McKenzies
- Released: June 22, 2010
- Recorded: 2010
- Genre: Celtic punk
- Length: 61:56
- Label: Fat Wreck Chords
- Producer: Fat Mike

The Real McKenzies chronology
Off the Leash (2008)	Shine Not Burn (2010)	Westwinds (2012)

Shine Not Burn is a live album by Scottish-Canadian Celtic punk band The Real McKenzies, and their seventh album overall. It was recorded in 2010 at an acoustic pub show at Wild at Heart in Berlin-Kreuzberg, Germany and released on June 22 of that year. The title is the translation of "Luceo Non Uro" which is the Chief's heraldic motto of the clan McKenzie.

== Track listing ==
1. Nessie
2. Drink the Way I Do
3. 10,000 Shots
4. Pickled
5. Auld Mrs. Hunt
6. Bastards
7. My Bonnie
8. Chip
9. Scots Wha’ Ha’e
10. Droppin’ Like Flies
11. Pour Decisions
12. The Skeleton and the Tailor
13. Best Day Until Tomorrow
14. Bitch Off the Money
15. Get Lost
16. Wild Mountain Thyme
17. Whisky Scotch Whisky
18. Sawney Beane Clan
19. Kings o’ Glasgow
20. Taylor Made II
21. Bugger Off
