= Richard Hudson (musician) =

British musician (born 1948)

- Born: Richard William Stafford Hudson; 9 May 1948 (age 78); Tottenham, London, England
- Genres: Progressive rock; punk rock; psychedelic
- Occupations: Musician; singer
- Instruments: Drums; guitar; sitar; vocals
- Years active: 1960s–present
- Label: A&M

Richard William Stafford Hudson (born 9 May 1948) is an English musician who played drums and sitar for the Strawbs. He later joined forces with bassist John Ford to form a duo, Hudson Ford, in which he played guitar and sang.

== Career ==
Richard Hudson was a member of Elmer Gantry's Velvet Opera, in which he played drums and sitar and sang. In 1970, he and band-mate John Ford joined Strawbs. Hudson and Ford began to co-write material which appeared to be aiming in a slightly different direction to the compositions of Strawbs' main writer, Dave Cousins. In 1973 after a 52-date tour to promote the album Bursting at the Seams, there were acrimonious exchanges (which both parties now regret). Hudson and Ford left to form Hudson Ford. Hudson at this point switched from playing drums to guitar and sang more lead vocals.

The punk era sounded the death knell of many progressive rock acts, including Hudson Ford. Hudson, Ford and Terry Cassidy founded the mock punk group The Monks and, more strangely, High Society, which performed a pastiche of 1930s music.

Hudson rejoined Strawbs for their 1987 album Don't Say Goodbye and stayed on for 1991's Ringing Down the Years on which he co-wrote two tracks with bass player Rod Demick and guitarist Brian Willoughby.

In recent years he has played live gigs with Strawbs and continues to play with The Good Old Boys, alongside original Deep Purple bassist Nick Simper. In July 2009, The Good Old Boys released the CD Live at the Deep Purple Convention.

He also gigged with the Ali Mac band (Ali Mackenzie of The British Birds) in the 20 teens until the death of Ali Mackenzie during the Covid years.

== Discography ==
This is a list of recordings on which Hudson appears as a full-time band member.

=== Albums ===
==== Elmer Gantry's Velvet Opera ====
- Elmer Gantry's Velvet Opera (1968)
- Ride a Hustler's Dream (1969)

==== Strawbs ====
- Just a Collection of Antiques and Curios (1970)
- From the Witchwood (1971)
- Grave New World (1972)
- Bursting at the Seams (1973)
- Don't Say Goodbye (1987)
- Ringing Down the Years (1991)
- Blue Angel (2003)

==== Hudson Ford ====
- Nickelodeon (1973)
- Free Spirit (1974)
- When Worlds Collide (1975)
- Daylight (1977)

==== The Monks ====
- Bad Habits (1979)
- Suspended Animation (1981)

==== High Society ====
- High Society (1984)

==== The Good Old Boys ====
- Live at the Deep Purple Convention (2009)

=== Singles ===
==== Elmer Gantry's Velvet Opera ====
- "Flames"/"Salisbury Plain" (1967)
- "Mary Jane"/"Dreamy" (1968)
- "Volcano"/"A Quick B" (1969)
- "Anna Dance Square"/"Don't You Realise" (1969)
- "Black Jack Davy"/"Statesboro Blues" (1970)
- "She Keeps Giving Me These Feelings"/"There's a Hole in My Pocket" (1970)

==== Strawbs ====
- "Where is This Dream of Your Youth"/"Fingertips" (1970)
- "Benedictus"/"Keep the Devil Outside" (1972)
- "Keep the Devil Outside"/"Tomorrow" (1972)
- "New World"/"Benedictus" (1972)
- "Here it Comes"/"Tomorrow" (1972)
- "Going Home"/"Ways and Means" (1972)
- "Lay Down"/"Backside" (1972)
- "Part of the Union"/"Will You Go" (1973)

==== Hudson Ford ====
- "One and one is one"/ (1973)
- "Pick Up the Pieces"/"This is Not the Way to End a War (or Die)" (1973)
- "Take it Back"/"Make No Mistake" (1973)
- "Burn Baby Burn"/"Angels" (1974)
- "Slip and Slide"/"" https://www.youtube.com/watch?v=zJggucIl1Zk(1974)
- "Floating in the Wind"/"Revelations" (1974)
- "Free Spirit"/"Dark Lord" (1974)
- "When Love Has Overgrown"/"What is a Day Without Love" (1975)
- "Waterfall"/"Daylight" (1976)
- "95 in the Shade"/"Lost in a World" (1976)
- "Sold on Love"/"Daylight" (1976)
- "Are You Dancing"/"Out of Your Shadow" (1977)
- "Just Say No" (2001)

==== The G.B.'s ====
- "We are the G.B.'s" / "The G.B. Jig" (1979)

==== The Monks ====
- "Nice Legs Shame About the Face"/"You'll be the Death of Me" (1979)
- "I Ain't Gettin Any"/"Inter-City Kitty" (1979)
- "Johnny B. Rotten"/"Drugs in My Pocket" (1979)
- "I Can Do Anything You Like"/"Monks Medley" (1981)

==== High Society ====
- "I Never Go Out in the Rain"/"I Could Never Live Without You" (1980)
- "Gotta Get Out of This Rut"/"Powder Blue" (1981)

==== Hud ====
- "The Actor" (2005)
