= The Real McKenzies =

Canadian Celtic punk band

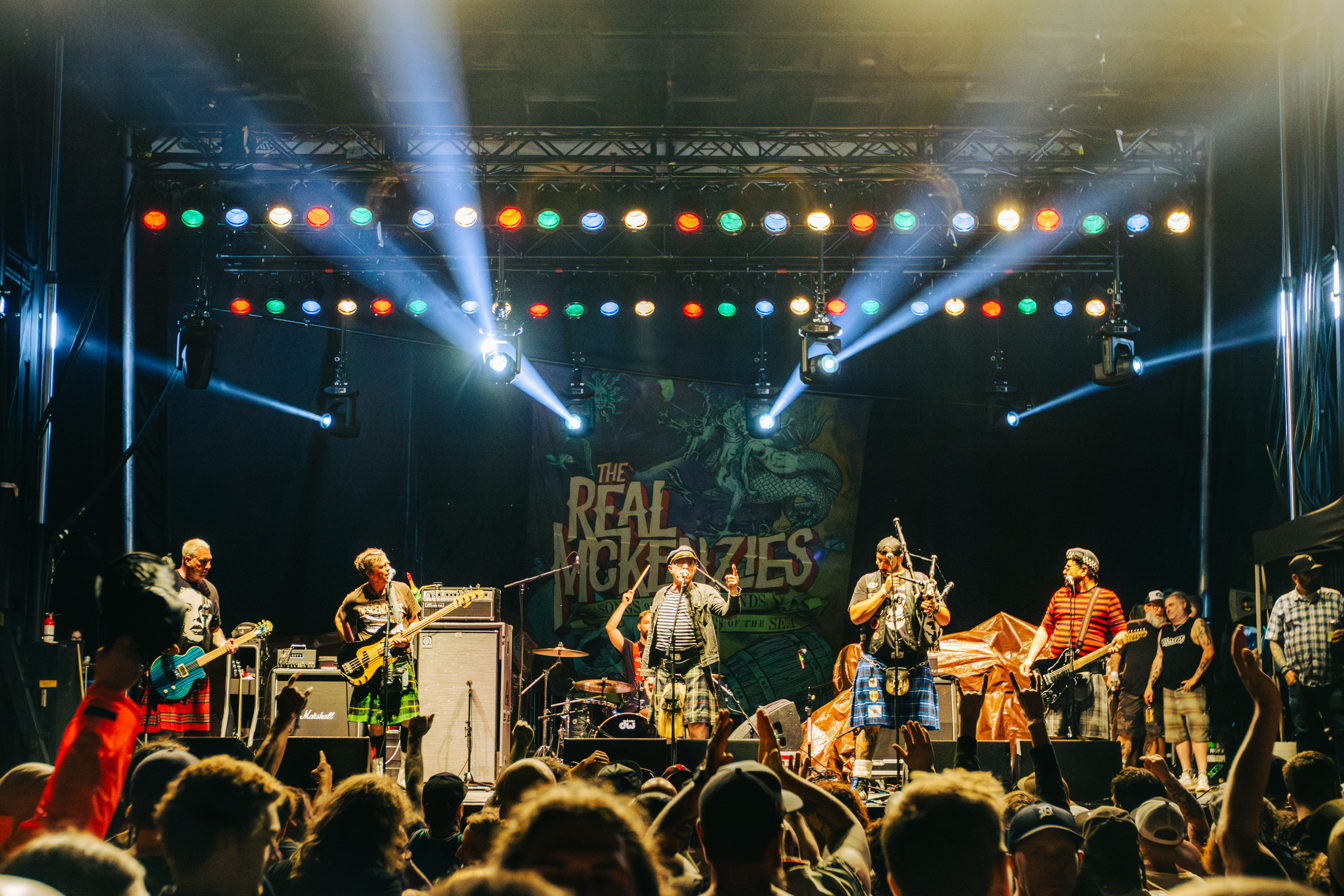
- The Real Mckenzies live at Punk In Drublic Toronto, Canada in August 2024

Background information
- Origin: Vancouver, British Columbia, Canada
- Genres: Celtic punk; folk punk
- Years active: 1992–present
- Labels: Fat Wreck Chords; Sudden Death; Honest Don's; Stomp
- Members: Paul McKenzie; Aspy Luison; Kenny Lush; Paul Patko (Paco); Barry Higginson; Mario Nieva
- Past members: See below
- Website: realmckenzies.com

The Real McKenzies is a Canadian Celtic punk band founded in 1992 and based in Vancouver, British Columbia. They are considered the founders of the Canadian Celtic punk movement, and were one of the first Celtic punk bands, albeit 10 years after The Pogues. Founding member Paul McKenzie has been the only continuous member of the band since its inception.

In addition to writing and performing original music, Real McKenzies perform traditional Scottish songs, and their take on traditional Scottish poetry, giving them a new punk-influenced sound. The band has shared stages with several other bands and artists, including Rancid, Shane MacGowan, NOFX, Flogging Molly, The Misfits, Metallica, the Specials, and Voodoo Glow Skulls.

== History ==
The band released their debut album, Real McKenzies in 1995, a cheeky collection of short punky originals, interspersed among celtic classics, and deeply tongue-in-cheek, punk-infused covers like "My Bonny", "Pliers" (Jimi Hendrix's "Fire"), "Kilt" (Alberto y Lost Trios Paranoias's "Kill"), and "Outta Scotch" (the Pointed Sticks's "Outta Luck"). Their 1998 follow up Clash of the Tartans popularized Scottish-Canadian punk-rock, with solid singles "Thistle Boy", "Pagan Holiday", "Mainland", "Kings O' Glasgow", and the old celtic classic "Wild Mountain Thyme". Frontman Paul McKenzie claims as many as 100 different musicians have performed as members of the band, including (now-deceased) bassist Rich "Rock" Priske (Matthew Good Band, Bif Naked; drummer Glenn "McKruger" Kruger (Bloody Chicletts, the Paperboys, Mudgirl, Carly Rae Jepsen); and piper Alan "Raven" MacLeod, of the pioneering 1970s Scottish folk band The Tannahill Weavers, and 1990s duo Bourne and MacLeod. In 2012, they delved deeper into covering songs from popular Canadian singer-songwriter Stan Rogers with their version of "Barrett's Privateers" appearing on their album Westwinds.

McKenzie said in 2014 that he "fired all the Americans" in the band, and returned to a full Canadian lineup. Despite that claim, Aspy Luison is from Cambre, Galicia, Spain.

In September 2014, the band announced they would be recording their next album for Fat Wreck Chords at Motor Studio in San Francisco. Michael "Fat Mike" Burkett will be producing the album.

On April 7, 2015, Fat Wreck Chords released The Real McKenzies' 11th album, Rats in the Burlap.

The band covered Stan Rogers a second time for their 2017 album Two Devils Will Talk with the song "Northwest Passage".

On March 10, 2022, it was announced that former War Baby drummer Kirby J. Fisher had joined the band.

== In popular culture ==
Their song "Tae the Battle" appeared in the 2008 British-Canadian film Stone of Destiny. Their song "Wild Cattieyote" appeared in the 2004 straight-to-video release of Vampires vs. Zombies (also called Carmilla the Lesbian Vampire). Their cover of the Turbonegro song "Sailor Man" appeared in the 2003 video game Tony Hawk's Underground and the first volume of the Elementality skateboarding videos. Each year, The Real McKenzies version of "Auld Lang Syne" is used as the countdown music on the New Year's Eve edition of Kevin Smith and Ralph Garman's live podcast Hollywood Babble-On. Their song "Chip" was used in the television series Billions in 2018. Also, in 2018, Paul McKenzie contributed vocals to the song "Foreman O'Rourke" by Sydney, Australia's The Rumjacks

== Band members ==
Current members

- Paul McKenzie – vocals (1992–present)
- Aspy Luison – bagpipes (2012–present)
- Kenny Lush – guitar (2022–present)
- Barry Higginson – bass (2021–present)
- Paul Patko (Paco) – drums (2022–present)
- Mario Nieva – guitar (2013–2015, 2019–present)

Past members

- Kirby J. Fisher - drums (2022)
- Dan Garrison - guitar (2015–2018)
- Dan Stenning - drums (2016–2018)
- Andrew Pederson - guitar (2017–2018)
- Tony Walker (Tony Baloney) – guitar, occasional bass (1992–1999)
- Rob Esch – drums (1992–1995)
- Aaron Chapman – bass (1992), tin whistle (1992–1994, 1994–1997)
- Rich Priske (Angus MacFuzzybutt) – bass (1992–1995, 1996–1998) (deceased)
- Nathan Roberts – bagpipes (1993)
- Alan "Raven" MacLeod – bagpipes, guitar (1993–1995, 1996–1998, 2008)
- Kurt Robertson (Dirty Kurt) – guitar, occasional bass (1993–2005, 2007–2013)
- Anthony Creery (Farkie) – bass (1995–1996)
- James Brander (JT Massacre) – drums (1995–1996)
- Jamie Fawkes – bass (1996, 1998–2004)
- Brien O'Brien – drums (1996–1998)
- Mike MacDonald – bagpipes (occasionally from 1997 to 1998)
- Glenn Kruger – drums (1998–2000)
- Bradford Lambert – drums (2000–2003, 2004–2005)
- Stuart MacNeil – bagpipes (1998–1999)
- Anthony Kerr – bagpipes (1999–2000)
- Mark "Bone" Boland – guitar (1999–2015)
- Matt Hawley (Matt MacNasty) – bagpipes (2000–2012, occasionally from 2012 to 2017)
- Eddie Big Beers – drums (2003)
- Ike Eidness – drums (2003–2004)
- Ken Fleming – bass (2004–2005)
- Sean Sellers – drums (2005–2012)
- Joe Raposo – bass (2005–2009)
- Dave Gregg – guitar (2005–2010)
- Karl Alvarez – bass (2007, 2009–2010)
- Justin "Gwomper" Burdick – bass (2010–2011, 2012)
- Brent Johnson – bass (2011), guitar (2011–2013)
- Gord Taylor – bagpipes (2010–2012, occasionally from 2012 to 2017)
- Jesse Pinner – drums (2012–2016)

Former guest members

- Glenn Murray – bass (1993)
- Jay Bentley – bass (1997)
- Dave Afflick – drums (2005)
- George McWhinnie – bass (2005)
- Boz Rivera – drums (2007, 2009, 2010)
- Randy Steffes – guitar, banjo (2009, 2012)
- Maggie Schmied – violin (2009)
- Robbie "Steed" Davidson – guitar (2010)

Timeline

== Discography ==
- Real McKenzies, 1995
- Clash of the Tartans, 1998
- Fat Club 7", 2000
- Loch'd and Loaded, 2001
- Pissed tae th' Gills, 2002
- Oot & Aboot, 2003
- 10,000 Shots, 2005
- Off the Leash, 2008
- Shine Not Burn, 2010
- Westwinds, 2012
- Rats in the Burlap, 2015
- Two Devils Will Talk, 2017
- Beer and Loathing, 2020
- Songs of the Highlands, Songs of the Sea, 2022
- Paul McKenzie Sings on Yer Bike, 2026

=== Filmography ===
- Pissed tae th' Gills, 2002

=== Compilations ===
- Short Music for Short People, 1999
- Alpha Motherfuckers - A Tribute to Turbonegro, 2001
- Agropop Now, 2003
- Floyd:..And Out Come the Teeth, a free Fat Wreck Chords compilation CD handed out at the label's tent during Warped Tour 2001
- Shot Spots - Trooper Tribute (Visionary Records)
- Live from Europe, Deconstruction Tour, 2003 - DVD

=== Music videos ===
- "Mainland" (1998)
- "Drink Some More" (2008)
- "Chip" (Live) (2008)
- "The Maple Trees Remember" (2009)
- "Culling the Herd" (2011)
- "My Luck Is So Bad" (2012)
- "Catch Me" (2015)
- "Stephen's Green" (2015)
- "Yes" (2015)
- "Due West" (2017)
- "Seafarers" (2017)
- "One Day" (2018)

== Images ==
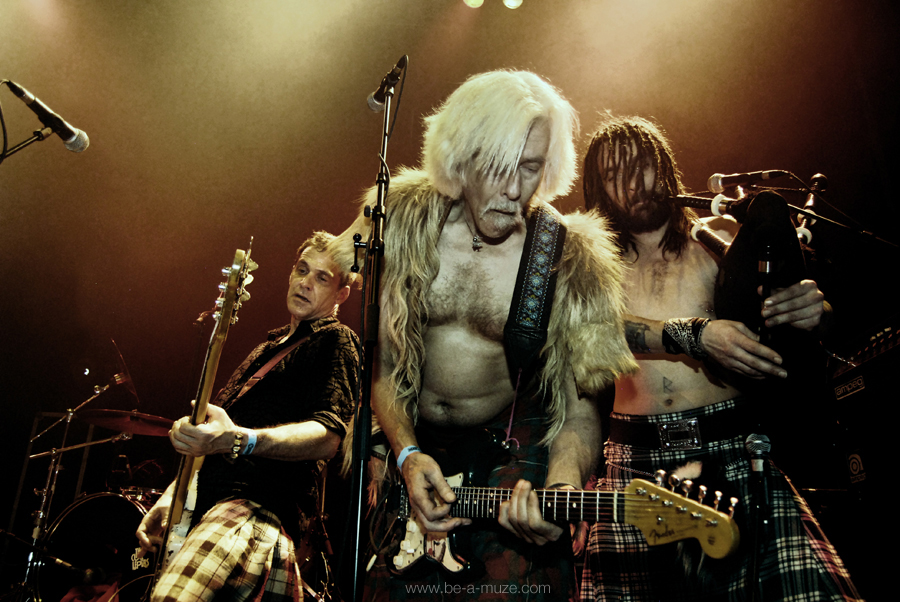

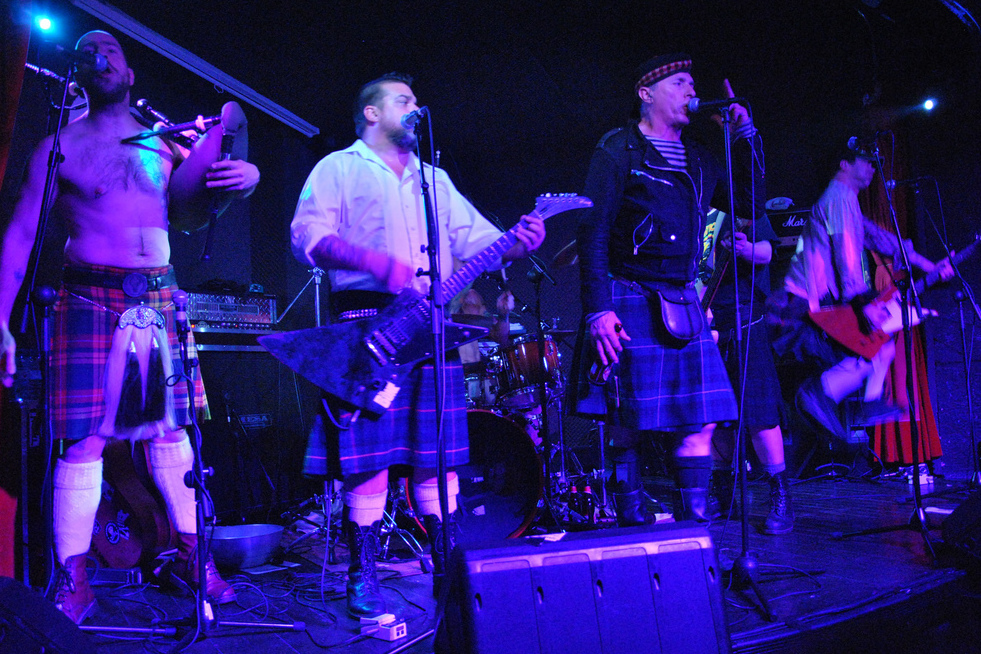

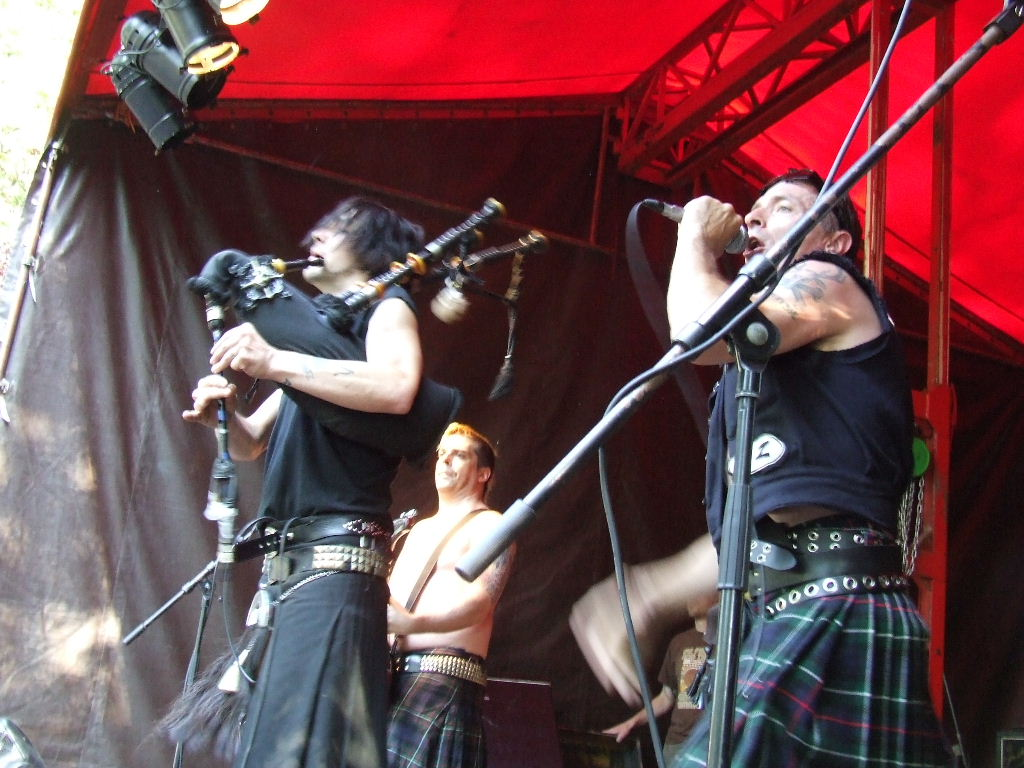

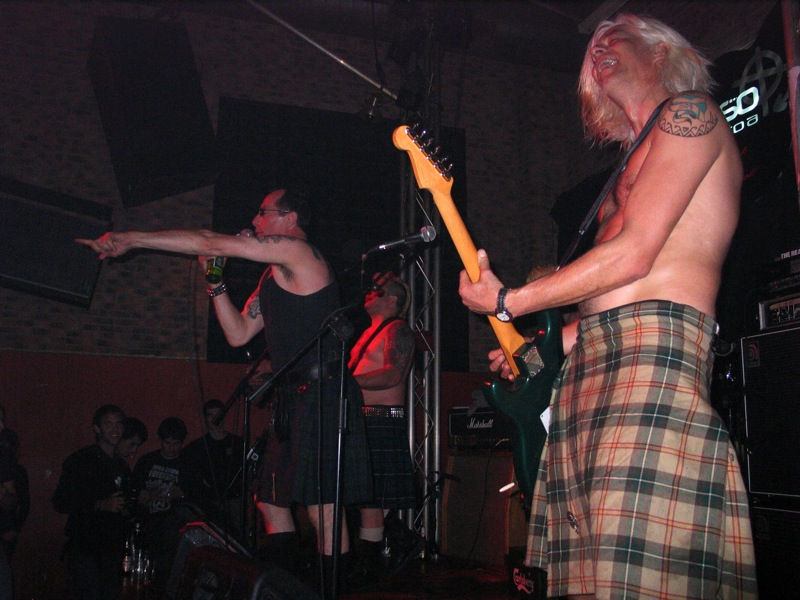

== See also ==
- List of bands from Canada
