= Part of the Union =

Single by Strawbs

from the album Bursting at the Seams
- B-side: "Will You Go"
- Released: January 1973
- Genre: Progressive folk; folk rock
- Length: 2:54
- Label: A&M
- Songwriters: Richard Hudson; John Ford
- Producer: Strawbs

Strawbs singles chronology
"Lay Down" (1972)	"Part of the Union" (1973)	"Shine on Silver Sun" (1973)

Official audio
- "Part of the Union" on YouTube

"Part of the Union" is a song by the English band Strawbs, featured on their 1973 album Bursting at the Seams and was the band's most successful single, peaking at No. 2 in the UK Singles Chart. It also reached No. 10 in the Irish Singles Chart.

== Background ==
The song was included on the album Bursting at the Seams but is not considered typical of the songs on that album. It was originally recorded without a contribution by band leader Dave Cousins and was to be released under the name of "The Brothers". It demonstrates the different, more commercial direction the writing partnership of Richard Hudson and John Ford was taking within the band.

The song (especially its chorus "You don't get me I'm part of the Union") quickly became popular as an unofficial anthem of the trade union movement. Subsequently, the Strawbs have confirmed that the song was written with genuine celebratory intent, in support of the unions.

The B-side track "Will You Go" is an arrangement of the Irish folk song "Wild Mountain Thyme" written by Belfast musician Francis McPeake, dating back to the repertoire of The Strawberry Hill Boys (the original name of Strawbs)

== Top of the Pops ==
In the band's appearance on BBC's Top of the Pops, on 8 February 1973, introduced by DJ Jimmy Savile, keyboardist Blue Weaver appeared with both piano and pedal harmonium and drummer Richard Hudson appeared with a marching bass drum emblazoned with the words "The Associated Union of Strawbs Workers".

== Charts ==
Chart (1973)	Peak position
Australia (Kent Music Report)	2
Canada (RPM)	48
Ireland	10
New Zealand (Listener)	5
United Kingdom (Official Charts Company)	2

== Other recordings and later use ==
The original "Brothers" recording can be found on the box set A Taste of Strawbs. Cockerel Chorus, who had a hit with "Nice One Cyril", also recorded the song for inclusion on their 1973 Party Sing-a-long album.

From 2007 to 2016 the song was a standard feature of the Strawbs' live set. and was included in their live DVD The Strawbs – Lay Down With The Strawbs, filmed and recorded live at The Robin 2 in Bilston, UK on 5 March 2006.

The song resurfaced on the UK television advertisement for insurance company Norwich Union in 1998.

The song is played at the end of Philadelphia Union home games.

== Personnel ==
- Dave Cousins – backing vocals, acoustic guitar
- Dave Lambert – backing vocals, electric guitar
- John Ford – lead vocals, bass guitar
- Richard Hudson – backing vocals, drums
- Blue Weaver – piano, harmonium
