= Brian Willoughby =

British guitarist

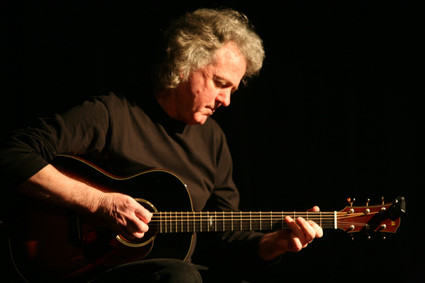

Background information
- Born: 20 September 1949 (age 76)
- Origin: Glenarm, County Antrim, Northern Ireland
- Genres: Rock, folk
- Occupation: Musician
- Instruments: Acoustic and electric guitar, Ukulele, Mandolin.
- Years active: 1960s–present
- Label: Cabritunes Records

Brian Willoughby (born 20 September 1949) is a British guitarist. He has worked with many musicians, notably Dave Cousins and The Strawbs, Mary Hopkin, as well as releasing solo work.

== Discography ==
(UK releases unless stated otherwise)

=== Albums ===
==== Solo ====
- Black and White (1998)
- Fingers Crossed (2004)
- Twiddly Bits (2022)

==== With other artists ====
- Old School Songs – with Dave Cousins (1979)
- The Contractual Album – Monty Python (1980)
- Suspended Animation (The Monks) (UK band) (Gold Album in Canada 1981)
- Don't Say Goodbye Strawbs (1987)
- Ringing Down the Years Strawbs (1991)
- The Bridge – with Dave Cousins (1994)
- Other Voices, Too (A Trip Back to Bountiful) – Nanci Griffith (1998)
- Baroque & Roll – Acoustic Strawbs (2001)
- Pigg River Symphony – Cathryn Craig (2001)
- I Will – with Cathryn Craig (2002)
- Blue Angel – Strawbs (2003)
- Full Bloom – Acoustic Strawbs (2005) live at Natural Sound, Kitchener, Ontario, Canada (2004)
- Live at the Royal Festival Hall – Mary Hopkin (2005)
- Calling All Angels + Cathryn Craig (2009)
- Real World + Cathryn Craig (2013)
- Painting by Numbers + Mary Hopkin (2013)
- In America + Cathryn Craig
- St.Pancras Old Church, London + Cathryn Craig
- The Cooley & Mourne + Cathryn Craig

Countless other albums as session player – 1969 – present.

=== Singles ===
- "The King" – Strawbs (1979)
- "That's When the Crying Starts" – Strawbs (Canada 1987)
- "Let it Rain" – Strawbs (Canada 1987)
- "Might as Well Be on Mars" – Strawbs (Canada 1991)
- "Alice's Song" – Acoustic Strawbs (2002)
- "Alice's Song" – Craig & Willoughby (2009)
- "Calling All Angels" – Craig & Willoughby (2009)
- "Rumours of Rain" – Folk for Peace (2013)
- "Freeway To Her Dreams " - Freeway To Her Dreams Written By Gordon Haskell
- "Whole Wide World" – Cathryn Craig & Brian Willoughby, featuring Righteous Brother Bill Medley Written By Gordon Haskell

Countless other singles as session player 1969 – present.

=== DVDs ===
- Complete Strawbs: The Chiswick House Concert (2002)
- Acoustic Strawbs Live in Toronto (2004) filmed July 12, 2003 at Hugh's room
- Rumours of Rain + Folk for Peace (2013)
- Other Voices, Too + Nanci Griffith (1999)
- Greatest Hits Live" + Strawbs (1990)
