= Bulbophyllum sect. Lepanthanthe =

Scientific classification
- Kingdom: Plantae
- Clade: Tracheophytes
- Clade: Angiosperms
- Clade: Monocots
- Order: Asparagales
- Family: Orchidaceae
- Subfamily: Epidendroideae
- Genus: Bulbophyllum
- Section: Bulbophyllum sect. Lepanthanthe; Schltr. 1913

Type species
- Bulbophyllum lepanthiflorum

Species
- See text

Synonyms
- Bulbophyllum sect. Trachyrachis Schltr. 1913

Section of flowering plants

Bulbophyllum sect. Lepanthanthe is a section of the genus Bulbophyllum.

== Description ==
Species in this section have creeping rhizomes with a small pseudobulb and a single flower.

== Distribution ==
Plants from this section are found in New Guinea and the western Pacific Islands.

== Species ==
Bulbophyllum section Lepanthanthe comprises the following species:

Image	Name	Distribution	Elevation (m)
	Bulbophyllum antennatum Schltr. 1905	New Guinea	1,300–2,600 metres (4,300–8,500 ft)
	Bulbophyllum baculiferum Ridl. 1916	New Guinea	
	Bulbophyllum bulliferum J.J.Sm. 1908	New Guinea and Papua New Guinea	
	Bulbophyllum cruttwellii J.J.Verm.1993	New Guinea	1,800–3,300 metres (5,900–10,800 ft)
	Bulbophyllum erinaceum Schltr. 1913	New Guinea	1,000 metres (3,300 ft)
	Bulbophyllum globulosum (Ridl.) Schuit. & de Vogel 2003	Western New Guinea	759 metres (2,490 ft)
	Bulbophyllum inquirendum J.J.Verm. 1993	New Guinea	1,800–2,200 metres (5,900–7,200 ft)
	Bulbophyllum lagaroglossum J.J.Verm. 2008	Papua New Guinea	20 metres (66 ft)
	Bulbophyllum lepanthiflorum Schltr. 1913	Papua New Guinea	200–700 metres (660–2,300 ft)
	Bulbophyllum leptophyllum W.Kittr. 1984 publ. 1985	New Guinea	1,400 metres (4,600 ft)
	Bulbophyllum parabates J.J.Verm. 1991	Papua New Guinea	450 metres (1,480 ft)
	Bulbophyllum paulianum J J Verm. Schuit. & de Vogel 2014	Papua New Guinea	1,800–2,800 metres (5,900–9,200 ft)
	Bulbophyllum quasimodo J.J.Verm. 1991	New Guinea	100–2,000 metres (330–6,560 ft)
	Bulbophyllum thersites J.J.Verm. 1993	New Guinea	1,100 metres (3,600 ft)
	Bulbophyllum toranum J.J.Sm. 1912	Indonesia and Papua New Guinea	0–1,000 metres (0–3,281 ft)
	Bulbophyllum trachypus Schltr. 1913	New Guinea	1,300 metres (4,300 ft)
