= The Human Bed =

Compilation album by Back Door
- Released: 3 June 2002
- Recorded: 1 March 1973 – 12 May 1974
- Genre: Jazz fusion
- Length: 46:00
- Label: Hux
- Producer: Jeff Griffin, Pete Ritzema, Tony Wilson

Back Door chronology
Activate (1976)	The Human Bed (2002)	Askin' the Way (2003)

Professional ratings
Review scores
Source	Rating
Allmusic	4/5 stars

The Human Bed is a live album by Back Door, released on 3 June 2002 by Hux Records and compiled from three sessions for BBC Radio 1. It takes its name from the composition "The Human Bed", first released on 1972's Back Door. The album, made between 1 March 1973 and 12 May 1974 at the BBC, includes four previously unreleased tracks.

== Track listing ==
All tracks are written by Ron Aspery and Colin Hodgkinson, except where noted.

Side one
No.	Title	Writer(s)	Length
1.	"Vienna Breakdown"		3:20
2.	"Blue Country Blues"		2:30
3.	"Captain Crack Up"		2:46
4.	"When You've Got a Good Friend"	Robert Johnson	3:19
5.	"Adolphus Beal"		3:43
6.	"Human Bed"		2:29
7.	"Fanny Wiggins"		3:01
8.	"Walkin' Blues"	Son House	3:45
9.	"Louisiana Blues"	Muddy Waters	3:15
10.	"Slivadiv"		3:32
11.	"The Spoiler"		5:31
12.	"T.B. Blues"	Jimmie Rodgers	3:27
13.	"Blakey Jones"		4:00
14.	"The Dashing White Sergeant"	Henry Rowley Bishop, John Burgoyne	1:22

== Personnel ==
Adapted from The Human Bed liner notes.

Back Door

- Ron Aspery – alto saxophone, soprano saxophone, electric piano (7, 8, 11), arrangement (14)
- Tony Hicks – drums
- Colin Hodgkinson – bass guitar, vocals, twelve-string guitar (12), arrangement (14)
- Dave MacRae – Electric piano (on tracks 10–14)

Production and additional personnel

- Bill Aitken – engineering
- Jeff Griffin – production (6–9)
- Russell Pay – mastering
- Michael Putland – photography
- Pete Ritzema – production (1–5)
- Tony Wilson – production (10–14)

== Release history ==
Region	Date	Label	Format	Catalog
United Kingdom	2002	Hux	CD	HUX 031
