= Jon Lord Blues Project =

British blues supergroup (2011)

Jon Lord Blues Project was a British blues band consisting of Jon Lord, Pete York, Zoot Money, Maggie Bell, Miller Anderson, and Colin Hodgkinson.

== Recordings ==
=== Jon Lord Blues Project Live ===
The recording was released in July 2011 by MFP Concerts Music Productions. The show was recorded live at Rottweil Jazzfestival on 14 May 2011 and features classic blues songs written by Willie Dixon and Robert Johnson, as well as more contemporary compositions by Deep Purple, Free, and Tom Waits. Jon Lord died of complications from his cancer treatment on 16 July 2012. The recording was mixed and mastered by Tom Müller at Flatliners Studio Ingolstadt, Germany.

1. "Back at the Chicken Shack" (James O. Smith)
2. "Hoochie Coochie Man" (Willie Dixon)
3. "Wishing Well" (John Bundrick/Simon Kirke/Paul Kossoff/Paul Rodgers)
4. "It Never Rains But It Pours" (George Money/Colin Allen)
5. "Fog on the Highway" (Miller Anderson)
6. "Lazy" (Jon Lord/Ian Gillan/Ritchie Blackmore/Roger Glover/Ian Paice)
7. "Walkin' Blues" (Robert Johnson)
8. "Way Down in the Hole" (Tom Waits)
9. "Houston (Scotland)" (Miller Anderson)
10. "Respect Yourself" (Luther Ingram/Mack Rice)
11. "When a Blind Man Cries" (Jon Lord/Ian Gillan/Ritchie Blackmore/Roger Glover/Ian Paice)
12. "I'm a Man" (James D. Miller/Stephen L. Winwood)

=== Personnel ===
- Jon Lord: Hammond organ
- Miller Anderson: guitar and vocals (2, 5, 9, 11, 12)
- Maggie Bell: vocals (3, 6, 8, 10, 12)
- Colin Hodgkinson: bass and vocals (7)
- Zoot Money: keyboards and vocals (4, 6, 10)
- Pete York: Drums
