= Miller Anderson (musician) =

UK-based blues guitarist and singer (born 1945)

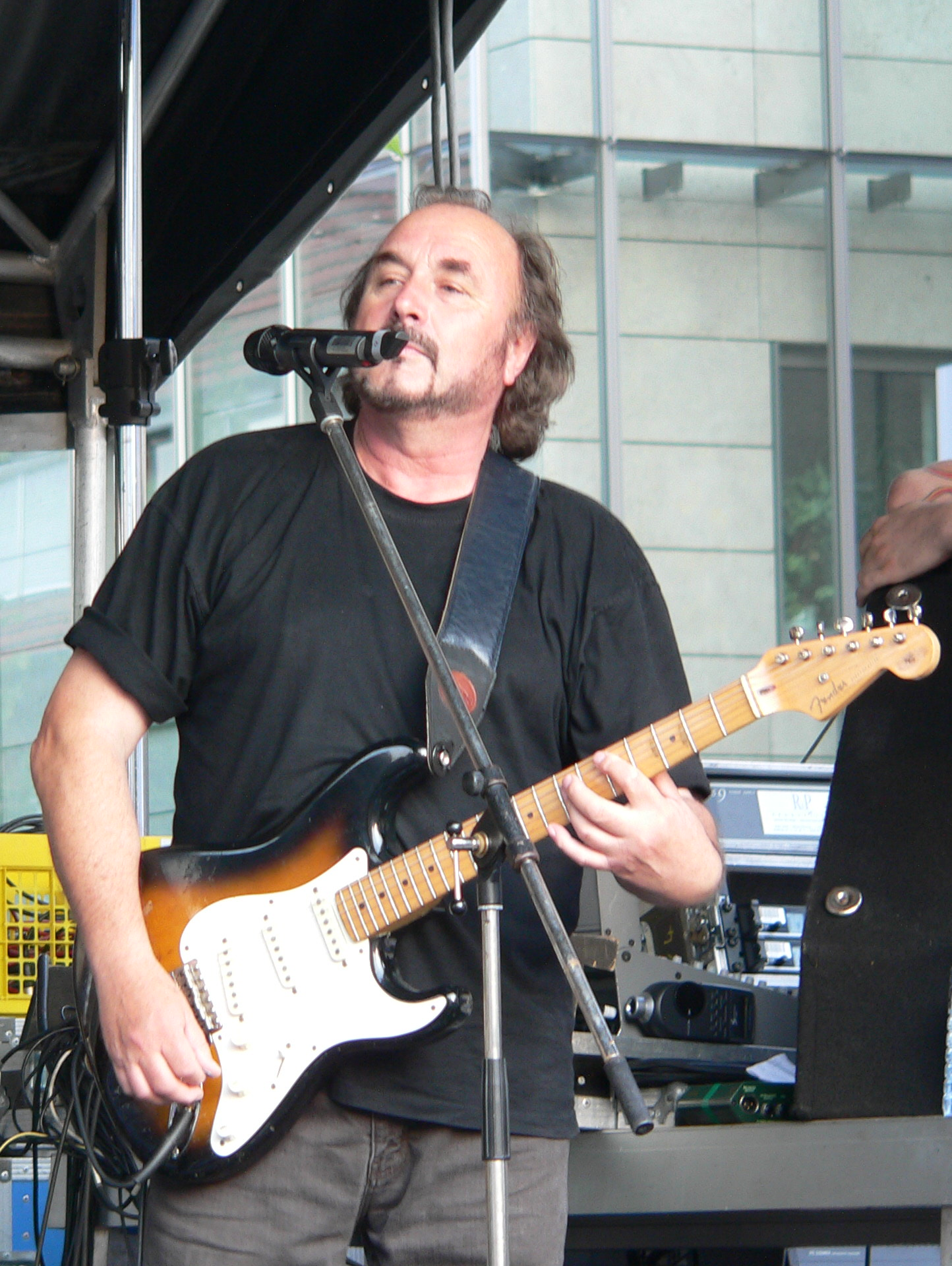
- Anderson performing in 2006

Background information
- Born: Miller Anderson; 12 April 1945 (age 81); Houston, Renfrewshire, Scotland
- Genres: Blues; glam rock; folk rock
- Instruments: Vocals; guitar; banjo; harmonica; bass
- Years active: 1960s–present
- Label: Warner Bros. (with The Dukes)
- Formerly of: Keef Hartley Band, Savoy Brown; T. Rex; Chicken Shack; The Dukes; Spencer Davis Group; Mountain; Jon Lord Blues Project; The British Blues Quintet

Miller Anderson (born 12 April 1945) is a UK-based blues and rock guitarist and singer.

He worked extensively with Ian Hunter in the formative years of the 1960s, before either of them achieved significant success. They worked in bands such as the Scenery and at Last The 1958 Rock 'n' Roll Show (later called Charlie Woolfe), and Anderson is referenced in the title track of Hunter's 1976 album All American Alien Boy ("well I remember all the good times me and Miller enjoyed, up and down the M1 in some luminous yo-yo toy"). Anderson would later guest on two Hunter solo albums.

Apart from pursuing his solo career, he was a member of the Keef Hartley Band. Other groups Anderson has been associated with are the Spencer Davis Group, Broken Glass, the Dukes, Mountain, Savoy Brown, T.Rex and Chicken Shack. In early 2006, he joined the British Blues Quintet with Maggie Bell, Zoot Money, Colin Hodgkinson and Colin Allen.

In the spring of 2016, Anderson returned to the studio and in July 2016 released a new album, Through the Mill.

Anderson was born in Houston, Renfrewshire, Scotland.

== Discography ==
=== Solo ===
- Bright City (1971)
- Celtic Moon (1998)
- Bluesheart (2003, re-issue 2007)
- Chameleon (2008)
- From Lizard Rock (DCD 2009)
- Live at Rockpalast (MIG Music – MIG 90 352) CD 2010
- Through the Mill (2016 - Anderson / Sherman Productions)
- Live in Vienna (2017 - Brücken Ton)

=== With Keef Hartley Band ===
- Halfbreed (1969)
- The Battle of North West Six (1969)
- The Time Is Near (1970)
- Overdog (1971)
- Little Big Band – Live at the Marquee (1971)

=== With Hemlock ===
- Hemlock (1972)

=== With Savoy Brown ===
- Boogie Brothers (1974)

=== With Dog Soldier ===
- Dog Soldier (1975)

=== With T.Rex ===
- Dandy in the Underworld (1977 - one track "Jason B. Sad")

=== With the Dukes ===
- The Dukes (album, 1979)

=== With Spencer Davis Group ===
- Live in Manchester 2002 (2003/2004, DVD/CD)

=== With the British Blues Quintet ===
- Live in Glasgow 2006 (2007)

=== With Jon Lord Blues Project ===
- Jon Lord Blues Project Live (2011)

=== Guest appearances ===
- Two Weeks Last Summer (1972, Dave Cousins)
- Overnight Angels (1977, Ian Hunter)
- Short Back and Sides (1981, Ian Hunter)
- Before I Forget (1982, Jon Lord)
- Superblues (1994, Pete York)
- Swinging Hollywood (1994, Pete York)
- Pictured Within (1998, Jon Lord)
- Live at the Royal Albert Hall (2000, Deep Purple)
- Not for the Pro's (2002, Ian Paice)
- Beyond the Notes (2004, Jon Lord)
- Beyond the Notes Live (2004, Jon Lord, DVD)
- The Boy in the Sailor Suit (2007, Dave Cousins)
- Hotel Eingang (2008, Chris Farlowe)
