= Quasimodo (disambiguation) =

Quasimodo is the title character in Victor Hugo's novel The Hunchback of Notre Dame as well as its various adaptations.

Quasimodo may also refer to:

- Quasimodo (magazine), a University of Notre Dame Australia student newspaper
- Quasimodo (comics), a Marvel Comics supervillain
- Quasimodo (music venue), a jazz club in Berlin, Germany
- Quasimodo Sunday, another name for the Second Sunday of Easter
- 17438 Quasimodo, a main-belt asteroid

== People ==
- Maria Cumani Quasimodo (1908–1995), Italian actress and dancer
- Salvatore Quasimodo (1901–1968), Italian poet and translator
- Santi Quasimodo (born 1887, dis. 1945), Italian Fascist general
- Quasimoto, side project and alias of hip-hop producer Madlib (born 1973)

== Plants and animals ==
- Bulbophyllum quasimodo, a species of orchid
- Quasimodo flies, a family of flies
- Schistura quasimodo, a species of stone loach
- Squalus quasimodo, a species of dogfish

== See also ==
- Quasimoto, side project of American hip hop producer Madlib (born 1973)
