= Askin' the Way =

Studio album by Back Door
- Released: 2003
- Genre: Jazz fusion
- Length: 48:18
- Label: Cultural Foundation

Back Door chronology
The Human Bed (2002)	Askin' the Way (2003)	The Impulse Session (2023)

Askin' the Way is the fifth and final studio album by Back Door, released in 2003 by Cultural Foundation. Featuring the original line-up of Ron Aspery, Tony Hicks and Colin Hodgkinson, the album comprises re-recordings of previously released songs and newly recorded compositions. It is the Back Door's first new material since 1976's Activate. John Fordham of The Guardian called the album "a guffawing, raw-edge cruise over a boogie bassline that makes you feel you're right there with them in the crowded pubs in which they honed this style."

== Track listing ==
All tracks are written by Ron Aspery and Colin Hodgkinson.

Side one
No.	Title	Length
1.	"The Old Country"	1:45
2.	"Nice One"	2:52
3.	"Human Bed"	2:21
4.	"Askin' the Way"	2:47
5.	"Blue Country Blues"	3:06
6.	"Folksong"	2:40
7.	"Back Door"	3:33
8.	"Hurlingham Down"	1:50
9.	"Shaken by Love"	4:10
10.	"Vienna Breakdown"	2:58
11.	"Spare Me the Tears"	2:16
12.	"The Sleaze"	3:57
13.	"Drinking with Boxers"	2:34
14.	"Snab's Rag"	2:26
15.	"Slivadiv"	2:33
16.	"The Cold Light of Day"	2:54
17.	"Get Lucky"	2:23
18.	"Black Horse"	1:05
19.	"Hammerman"	0:08

== Personnel ==
Adapted from the Askin' the Way liner notes.

Back Door

- Ron Aspery – saxophone, keyboards
- Tony Hicks – drums, accordion
- Colin Hodgkinson – bass guitar, vocals

== Release history ==
Region	Date	Label	Format	Catalog
United Kingdom	2003	Cultural Foundation	CD	CULT 023
