= Ode to John Law =

Studio album by Stone the Crows
- Released: October 1970
- Studio: Advision Studios, London
- Length: 41:48
- Language: English
- Label: Polydor
- Producer: Mark London

Stone the Crows chronology
Stone the Crows (1970)	Ode to John Law (1970)	Teenage Licks (1971)

Professional ratings
Review scores
Source	Rating
AllMusic	2.5/5 stars

Ode to John Law is the second studio album by Scottish band Stone the Crows.

== Track listing ==
Side one
No.	Title	Writer(s)	Length
1.	"Sad Mary"	John McGinnis	6:53
2.	"Friend"	Les Harvey, Jimmy Dewar	6:28
3.	"Love 74"	McGinnis	6:35

Side two
No.	Title	Writer(s)	Length
4.	"Mad Dogs and Englishmen"	Colin Allen, Harvey	3:34
5.	"Things Are Getting Better"	McGinnis	6:10
6.	"Ode to John Law"	Allen, Harvey	5:47
7.	"Danger Zone"	Percy Mayfield	6:21

== Personnel ==
Stone the Crows

- Colin Allen – drums, percussion
- Maggie Bell – vocals
- Jimmy Dewar – bass, vocals
- Les Harvey – acoustic and electric guitars
- John McGinnis – organ, piano, keyboards

Additional personnel

- Peter Grant – executive producer
- David Juniper – album design
- Mark London – producer
- Eddy Offord – engineering
- Leo Sauer – front cover painting
