= Secret Paths =

Secret Path or Secret Paths may refer to:

== Film, TV and video games ==
- Secret Paths (Κρυφά μονοπάτια Κryfa Monopatia), 2005–2006 Greek TV series with Anthimos Ananiadis
- Secret Paths, 2013 film by Michael Papas
- The Secret Path, or Chasing Secrets, 1999 TV film with Della Reese
- The Secret Path, 2014 UK film List of LGBT-related films
- El Camino Secreto (The Secret Path), 1986 telenovela
- "The Secret Path", 2013 two-part episode of Spookville
- Secret Paths (video game), a 1997 interactive novel developed by Purple Moon

== Other uses ==
- Secret Path, 2016 album and graphic novel by Gord Downie
- Secret Paths (album), by Dave Cousins
- The Secret Path, 1935 book by Paul Brunton
- The Secret Path, a painting by Mariquita Jenny Moberly

== See also ==
- The Mysterious Cities of Gold: Secret Paths game developed by Neko Entertainment
