= Duochrome =

Duochrome may refer to:

- Duochrome test
- Duochrome nail polish
- Duochrome (album) Dave Cousins 2008
