= Stone the Crows (album) =

Studio album by Stone the Crows
- Released: January 1970
- Studio: Advision Studios, London
- Genre: Rock; blues; soul; progressive folk
- Length: 38:01
- Label: Polydor
- Producer: Mark London

Stone the Crows chronology
Stone the Crows (1970)	Ode to John Law (1970)

Stone the Crows is the debut album by Scottish rock band Stone the Crows.

== Legacy ==
In a retrospective review for AllMusic, Peter Kurtz feels the album contains rock, blues, and soul elements; however, despite confident guitar work and a spirited effort, these elements are not successfully melded together.

== Track listing ==
Side one
No.	Title	Writer(s)	Length
1.	"The Touch of Your Loving Hand"	Jimmy Dewar, Les Harvey	6:03
2.	"Raining in Your Heart"	Jimmy Dewar, Les Harvey	5:08
3.	"Blind Man"	Josh White, Jr.; arranged by Maggie Bell and Les Harvey	5:11
4.	"The Fool on the Hill"	John Lennon, Paul McCartney	4:09

Side two
No.	Title	Writer(s)	Length
1.	"I Saw America"	Colin Allen, Les Harvey, Mark London	17:20

== Personnel ==
Stone the Crows

- Colin Allen – drums, percussion
- Maggie Bell – vocals
- Jimmy Dewar – bass guitar, vocals
- Les Harvey – acoustic, electric guitars
- John McGinnis – organ, piano, keyboards

Additional personnel

- Robin Black – engineering
- Peter Grant – executive producer
- Mark London – producer
- Christopher Neil – engineering
- Chris Welch – liner notes
