= Back Door (jazz trio) =

British musical group; jazz-rock trio

- Origin: Blakey, Yorkshire
- Genres: Jazz fusion, blues
- Years active: 1971–2003
- Labels: Warner Bros. Records; Cultural Foundation
- Past members: Colin Hodgkinson; Ron Aspery (deceased); Tony Hicks (deceased); Adrian Tilbrook; Dave McRae

Back Door were a British jazz-rock trio, formed in 1971.

== Band members ==
- Colin Hodgkinson (born 14 October 1945, Peterborough, Cambridgeshire, England) – bass guitar, vocals
- Ron Aspery (born Ronald Arnold Aspery, 9 June 1946, Middlesbrough, Yorkshire – died 10 December 2003, Saltdean, East Sussex) – Soprano saxophone, flute, Electric piano
- Tony Hicks (born Anthony Hicks, 8 August 1948, Middlesbrough, Yorkshire – died 13 August 2006, Sydney, Australia) – drums (1971–1976)
- Adrian Tilbrook (born 20 July 1948, Hartlepool, County Durham) – drums (1976–2003)

== Career ==
Colin Hodgkinson first met Ron Aspery whilst the two were playing in Eric Delaney's Showband. The two began to talk about forming their own band around 1969, and eventually Back Door came to fruition in 1971, with Tony Hicks joining on drums. Hodgkinson made an innovative use of the electric bass, making it a lead instrument rather than a part of a rhythm section.

Their unique brand of jazz-rock and Hodgkinson's original playing was a hit at their regular venue; the Lion Inn on Blakey Ridge, Yorkshire. However, record labels were not keen and the band were repeatedly told "No singer, no contract". Ever the innovators, the band decided to record their first album themselves. It was recorded on a 4-track Ampex mixing console in eight hours, and mixed in four hours the next day. Around 1,000 copies were first printed by RCA. The album was sold over the bar at The Lion Inn, and at a few record shops in the local area.

A copy of the record somehow made its way to the NME headquarters in London, and a superb review by Charles Shaar Murray was printed. After a few more reviews, the band passed an interview, and began playing a regular slot at The Senate in Peterlee, despite Aspery snapping a key off his saxophone moments before the audition. The band's popularity increased when they were asked to play a two-week stint at Ronnie Scott's club in London, opening for Chick Corea, a run that was eventually lengthened to three weeks. The record companies changed their tune, and after receiving many offers, the trio decided to sign with Warner Brothers. The band rejected an offer from Richard Branson (who was just starting up Virgin Records at the time) because, according to Hodgkinson, "they were successful – this other guy seemed really nice, but he had no track record". Warner Brothers then re-released their debut album. They were featured several times on John Peel's influential radio show during the early 1970s, bringing them to a much wider audience.

In 1973, the trio went to New York City to record their second album, 8th Street Nites. The album was produced by former Cream producer, Felix Pappalardi. This was their first album to feature vocals, provided by Hodgkinson because "we needed a singer, and I was the least bad out of us." Pappalardi himself also played electric piano on one track and percussion on three others. Warner Brothers duly released the record, and a tour of the United States supporting Emerson, Lake & Palmer followed. Subsequent tours (usually as the support act) included one with Alexis Korner in Germany, which led to a long-lasting collaboration between Korner and Hodgkinson, and The J. Geils Band in the US, and a few as headliners on the university circuit in the UK.

By the time they recorded their third LP, Another Fine Mess, Dave MacRae had joined the band on piano, although he is only credited as a guest on the sleeve notes. He was a friend that Hicks made while in Australia. The band shifted style slightly on this album, and more effects, processing, and electronic sounds were used, although they were still defined as jazz-rock. McRae's stint in the band only lasted about a year, however, and by the time they recorded Activate in 1976 he had departed the band, as had longtime drummer, Tony Hicks. The band hired Adrian Tilbrook as a replacement on drums, claiming they needed "a more hard-hitting drummer." The album was produced by Carl Palmer.

After the release of Activate, the band played less and less together, and eventually broke up around 1977. Aspery went on to do work as a session musician (including on the soundtrack for The Spy Who Loved Me) and composer primarily for KPM (some of which were licensed for use in shows such as SpongeBob SquarePants, The Ren & Stimpy Show and ZZZap!), and Hodgkinson worked in a string of projects including The Spencer Davis Group, a stint playing live with Alexis Korner, as did Aspery, and a few outfits alongside Jan Hammer, then of The Mahavishnu Orchestra.

== Reunion ==
The original line-up briefly reunited for what was initially one night at the Ronnie Scott's 1986, although this was subsequently followed by a short tour of the UK.

In 2003, the original line-up reunited once again to record a new album. Askin' the Way consists of eight re-workings of favourite old songs, and 11 new recordings. Hicks also played accordion on this album on a couple of tracks. The official launch took place in The Lion at Blakey Ridge, where the band had first started out back in 1971. The band then played a few more shows but Aspery had been suffering from an illness for quite some time, and decided that the rigours of the road were no longer for him. On 10 December that year, Ron Aspery died at his home in Saltdean, Sussex.

The band played a few more concerts in 2005 with Rod Mason on saxophone, including the Guildhall venue at the Brecon Jazz Festival, Hull Jazz Festival, and further sold–out Blakey concerts in 2005.

Tony Hicks died in Sydney, Australia, on 13 August 2006.

In 2003, Bonfire Records released The Impulse Session. This album contained 13 tracks recorded at Impulse Studio in Wallsend and was recorded in 1971, the year before their debut album was recorded. Eight of the 13 tracks are early versions of tracks subsequently released on Back Door's first two albums whilst four of the remaining five are previously unreleased original tracks. The fifth is a cover of Robert Johnson's "Sweet Home Chicago". Colin Hodgkinson wrote the sleeve notes.

== Re-formation ==
In 2007, Colin Hodgkinson formed a new trio under the name Colin Hodgkinson Group with Rod Mason (sax) and Paul Robinson (drums). In 2008, they released Back Door Too!, a mixture of old Back Door numbers and new material.

== Discography ==
Studio albums

- Back Door (1972)
- 8th Street Nites (1973)
- Another Fine Mess (1975)
- Activate (1976)
- Askin' the Way (2003)
- The Impulse Session (2023) Session recorded in 1971 predating their debut album. Contains five previously unreleased tracks and eight early versions of tracks subsequently on the first two albums.

Live album (BBC Radio 1 sessions)

- The Human Bed (2002)

Compilation album

- Back Door/8th Street Nites/Another Fine Mess (BGO reissue of first 3 albums (2014)

Collaboration

- Ron Aspery and Colin Hodgkinson both played on Emerson, Lake & Palmer's Works Vol 2 album, on Carl Palmer's piece Bullfrog. 1977

== Bibliography ==
- The New Musical Express Book of Rock, 1975, Star Books, ISBN 0-352-30074-4
