= The Dukes (British band) =

British band (1978–1979)

- Years active: 1978–1979
- Label: Warner Bros.
- Past members: Miller Anderson; Jimmy McCulloch; Martin Stone; Charles Tumahai; Ronnie Leahy; Nick Trevisick

The Dukes were a British band formed in the late 1970s. The members included singer Miller Anderson, guitarist Jimmy McCulloch, Ronnie Leahy and bassist Charles Tumahai. They toured supporting Wishbone Ash and recorded one album. The band broke up soon after McCulloch died of an overdose.

The Dukes (or the group of musicians that would become The Dukes) also recorded demos with Mick Taylor in 1976. They went on to be backing band for Donovan on a world tour with Yes.

== Discography ==
=== Albums ===
- The Dukes (Warner Bros., 1979/CD: Wounded Bird Records, U.S. - WOU3376, 2009). All songs written by Anderson and Leahy except where specified.

"Hearts in Trouble" - 03:41 (Anderson)
"Leaving It All Behind" - 03:08 (Anderson-Leahy-Zito)
"All in a Game" - 03:04 (Anderson)
"Billy Niles" - 04:00 (Anderson)
"Crazy Fool" - 05:05
"Who's Gonna Tell You" - 03:26
"Time on Your Side" - 04:57
"I'll Try to Help" - 04:07
"Heartbreaker" (Vocals by McCulloch) - 03:48 (McCulloch-Allen)

Personnel

- Producer: Marty Cohn, Richie Zito
- Cover design: Hipgnosis

=== Singles ===
- "Hearts in Trouble" (1979)
