= The British Blues Quintet =

British blues rock band (2006–2013)

- Cover of the band's 2007 live album Live in Glasgow (Recorded at The Ferry)

Background information
- Origin: United Kingdom
- Genres: Blues, blues rock
- Years active: 2006–2013
- Label: Angel Air
- Past members: Zoot Money; Colin Allen; Maggie Bell; Colin Hodgkinson; Miller Anderson

The British Blues Quintet were a British band formed in 2006 by five musicians, known for their interpretations of blues music. The line-up included keyboardist and singer Zoot Money, drummer Colin Allen, vocalist Maggie Bell, bassist Colin Hodgkinson and guitarist Miller Anderson. They recorded a live album, Live in Glasgow (Recorded at The Ferry) (2007). As a result of differences due to the participation of some band members in Jon Lord Blues Project, Colin Allen disbanded the British Blues Quintet in 2013.

== Discography ==
Professional ratings
Review scores
Source	Rating
AllMusic	4.5/5 stars

- Live in Glasgow (Recorded at The Ferry) (2007), Angel Air
