= Call Me by My Name =

Studio album by Ruby Turner
- Released: October 13, 1998
- Recorded: May–July 1998
- Studio: Falconer Studios, London
- Genre: Soul, blues rock
- Length: 62:08
- Label: Indigo Records
- Producer: Zoot Money

Ruby Turner chronology
Guilty (1996)	Call Me by My Name (1998)	Mover (1998)

Call Me by My Name is the sixth studio album by British soul singer Ruby Turner, released in October 1998. Turner co-wrote five songs and enlisted the help of rhythm and blues luminaries Bobby Tench, Zoot Money, Stan Webb and Bad Company bassist Boz Burrell.

== Track listing ==
1. "Call Me by My Name" (Ruby Turner, Andrew G. Williams) 4:38
2. "Reassure Me" (Bowers) 4:17
3. "Suspicious Again" (Milton, Ruby Turner) 4:17
4. "Just Say the Word" (Besencon, Michele Vice) 4:35
5. "Brand New World" (Ruby Turner, Andrew G. Williams) 5:03
6. "Breath I Need" (Milton, Turner) 4:44
7. "You Were Never Mine" (Delbert McClinton, Gary Nicholson, Benmont Tench) 3:52
8. "My Intuition Tells Me" (Ebanks) 4:54
9. "Let Me Show You (My Mistakes)" (Duke, McClinton) 4:47
10. "Alone Here Tonight" (Milton, Ruby Turner) 3:14
11. "Last on My List (No More)" (Ruby Turner, Andrew G. Williams} 4:14
12. "Could You Need Me Too" (Ruby Turner, Andrew G. Williams) 3:59
13. "There for You" (Ruby Turner, Andrew G. Williams) 4:47
14. "All Shall Be Well" (Ruby Turner, Andrew G. Williams) 4:47

== Personnel ==
=== Musicians ===
- Ruby Turner – vocals, backing vocals
- Boz Burrell – bass
- Sam Kelly – drums
- Zoot Money – keyboards, backing vocals
- Bobby Tench – electric guitar, vocals
- Stan Webb – guitar
- Andy G. Williams – piano

=== Production ===
- Zoot Money – producer
- Phil Rogers – Design
- Harry Shapiro – Liner Notes
- Del Taylor – Executive Producer
- Adrian Zolotuhin – Engineer
