= Stone the Crows =

Scottish rock band (1969–1973)

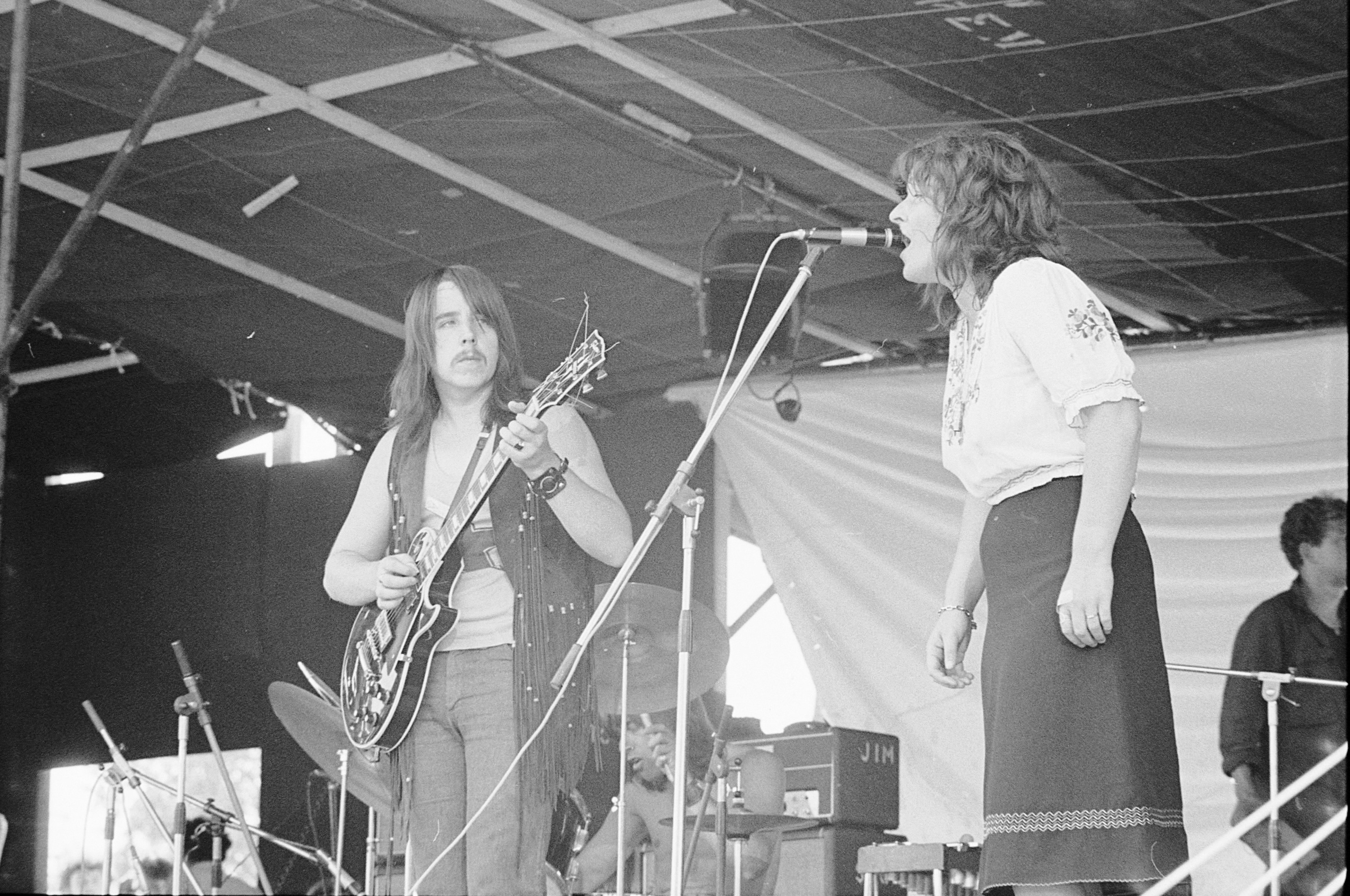
- Stone the Crows at Kralingen Music Festival 1970

Background information
- Origin: Glasgow, Scotland
- Genres: Rock; blues rock
- Years active: 1969–1973
- Past members: Leslie Harvey; Maggie Bell; Colin Allen; John McGinnis; Jim Dewar; Steve Thompson; Ronnie Leahy; Jimmy McCulloch

Stone the Crows were a Scottish blues rock band formed in Glasgow in late 1969. They are remembered for the onstage electrocution of guitarist and founding member Les Harvey.

== History ==
The band were formed after Maggie Bell was introduced to Les Harvey by his elder brother Alex Harvey. After playing together in the Kinning Park Ramblers, their next band Power was renamed Stone the Crows (after a British/Australian English exclamation of surprise or shock) by Led Zeppelin's manager, Peter Grant. The band was co-managed by Grant and Mark London. London was associated with Lulu as the co-writer of her signature song, "To Sir With Love" and was also married to Lulu's manager, Marion Massey. London had also managed the predecessor band Cartoone, in which Peter Grant had a financial interest and featured Les Harvey on guitar.

=== Original line-up ===
- Maggie Bell, vocals
- Les Harvey, guitar
- Colin Allen, drums
- James Dewar, bass and vocals
- John McGinnis, keyboards

The band's first two albums were recorded with the original line up and Bell's vocals were described as being similar to Janis Joplin's.

=== Second line-up and onstage death of Les Harvey ===
McGinnis and Dewar left the band in 1971 and were replaced by Ronnie Leahy and Steve Thompson.

Guitarist and co-founder Les Harvey was electrocuted onstage in front of a live audience at Swansea's Top Rank Suite in May 1972. Wires to the group's equipment were reportedly damaged by the audience and although the road crew attempted to repair the damage, they overlooked a loose ground wire. Harvey received a jolt of electricity as he reached for a microphone while his fingers touched the metal strings on his guitar. His body reportedly flew into the air and came to rest with his guitar in contact with the microphone stand. Bandmates who tried to rescue him reportedly got shocked themselves and it wasn't until someone kicked his guitar away that medical personnel were able to render aid. He was pronounced dead on arrival at the hospital.

At the suggestion of Thompson, the band originally contacted Peter Green to replace Harvey. The band rehearsed with Green for six weeks to prepare for an upcoming music festival, although Green pulled out two days before the obligation. Jimmy McCulloch ultimately became the band's lead guitarist. Christine McVie, who replaced Green in Fleetwood Mac, believed that Green was not seriously committed to becoming a member of Stone the Crows. "The whole thing was a misunderstanding. Pete might have led them to think that he was joining... he actually had no intention of joining that band or any other band for that matter."

=== Post-breakup ===
Stone the Crows ultimately broke up in June 1973, and Peter Grant continued to manage Maggie Bell's career. Guided by Grant, Bell subsequently recorded two solo albums, Queen of the Night (1974) and Suicide Sal (1975) and an album with the Grant-managed band Midnight Flyer (1981). Bell is also known for her session work on Rod Stewart's album Every Picture Tells a Story (1971), in particular her co-lead vocal with Stewart on the album's title track (credited as "vocal abrasives"). Jimmy McCulloch joined Paul McCartney's group Wings, in Nashville, Tennessee, in 1974.

== Discography ==
=== Studio albums ===
- Stone the Crows (1970)
- Ode to John Law (1970)
- Teenage Licks (1971)
- Ontinuous Performance (1972) – UK number 33

=== Live albums ===
- The BBC Sessions, Volume 1: 1969–1970 (1998)
- The BBC Sessions, Volume 2: 1970–1971 (1998)
- Live Montreux 1972 (2002)
- Radio Sessions 1969–1972 (2009) (2-CD)
- BBC Sessions 1969–1972 (2014) (2-LP)
