= Two Weeks Last Summer =

Studio album by Dave Cousins
- Released: October 1972
- Recorded: June 1972
- Genres: folk-rock, singer-songwriter
- Length: 38:26
- Label: A&M
- Producers: Dave Cousins, Tom Allom

Dave Cousins chronology
Two Weeks Last Summer (1972)	The Boy in the Sailor Suit (2007)

Singles from Two Weeks Last Summer
- 1. "Going Home"

Professional ratings
Review scores
Source	Rating
Allmusic	3/5 stars

Two Weeks Last Summer is the first solo album by Dave Cousins, singer and guitarist from the Strawbs. It was released in 1972 on A&M Records.

== Track listing ==
All songs written by Dave Cousins

1. "Two Weeks Last Summer" – (3:07)
2. "October to May" – (2:27)
3. "Blue Angel" – (9:48)
  "Divided"
  "Half Worlds Apart"
  "At Rest"
4. "That's the Way It Ends" (including "The World") – (3:00)
5. "The Actor" – (4:28)
6. "When You Were a Child" – (3:02)
7. "Ways and Means" – (4:22)
8. "We'll Meet Again Sometime" – (4:48)
9. "Going Home" – (3:24)

on the CD, the tracks "The World" and "That's the Way It Ends" are listed separately with timings of 1:45 and 1:15 respectively.

== Personnel ==
- Dave Cousins – lead vocal, guitars, piano
- Dave Lambert – guitars, backing vocals
- Miller Anderson – lead guitar, slide guitar
- Jon Hiseman – drums, percussion
- Roger Glover – bass guitar
- Tom Allom – organ, backing vocals
- Rick Wakeman – organ, piano
- Tom Newman – backing vocals
- The Robert Kirby Wind Septet

The track "Going Home" is credited with personnel "Lampoon". The track had originally been planned as a Dave Lambert single before he joined Strawbs. Cousins replaced Lambert's vocals with his own and released it as a single. It is believed that the other musicians were Blue Weaver on keyboards, John Ford on bass guitar and Richard Hudson on drums. This would have been the first time that this new Strawbs line-up recorded together.

== Recording ==
- Dave Cousins – producer
- Tom Allom – producer, engineer

Recorded at The Manor, Kidlington, Oxford in June 1972.

== Release history ==
Region	Date	Label	Format	Catalog
United Kingdom	October 1972	A&M Records	stereo LP	AMLH 68118
Canada	October 1972	A&M Records	stereo LP	SP 9008
		A&M Records	compact cassette	ZCAM 68118
		A&M Records	8-track cartridge	Y8AM 68118
United Kingdom	2003	SDR Records	CD	SDRCD 010
