= Another Fine Mess (Back Door album) =

Studio album by Back Door
- Released: 1975
- Studio: Nova Sound and CBS Studios, London
- Genre: Jazz fusion
- Length: 36:02
- Label: Warner Bros.
- Producer: Peter Thorup

Back Door chronology
8th Street Nites (1973)	Another Fine Mess (1975)	Activate (1976)

Another Fine Mess is the third studio album by Back Door, released in 1975 by Warner Bros. Records. "Blakey Jones" is a tribute to Brian Jones, landlord of the Lion Inn on Blakey Ridge, an early supporter of the band who helped finance the recording of their first album. A display case of Back Door memorabilia still exists in the Lion Inn.

In 2014 it was re-released on CD, compiled with Back Door and 8th Street Nites, by BGO Records.

== Track listing ==
All tracks are written by Ron Aspery and Colin Hodgkinson, except where noted.

Side one
No.	Title	Writer(s)	Length
1.	"I'm Gonna Stay a Long, Long Time"	Ron Aspery, Colin Hodgkinson, Dave MacRae	3:30
2.	"Blakey Jones"		4:16
3.	"T.B. Blues"	Jimmie Rodgers	3:31
4.	"Candle Round Your Hat"		4:45
5.	"Detroit Blues"		2:43

Side two
No.	Title	Writer(s)	Length
1.	"The Spoiler"		4:53
2.	"Shaken by Love"		4:11
3.	"Streamline Guitar"		2:30
4.	"Manager's Shirt"		2:38
5.	"The Dashing White Sergeant"	Henry Rowley Bishop, John Burgoyne	3:05

== Personnel ==
Adapted from the Another Fine Mess liner notes.

Back Door

- Ron Aspery – alto saxophone, soprano saxophone, Wurlitzer electric piano, arrangements
- Tony Hicks – drums, percussion
- Colin Hodgkinson – bass guitar, twelve-string guitar, lead vocals, arrangements

Production and additional personnel

- Rick Dodd – recording
- Michael Gibbs – arrangement (A5)
- Bernie Holland – guitar (B1, B2)
- Dave MacRae – keyboards, accordion
- Peter Thorup – production, mixing, backing vocals (A1, B3), lead vocals (B4)
- Steve Tyler – recording, mixing

== Release history ==
Region	Date	Label	Format	Catalog
United Kingdom	1975	Warner Bros.	LP	K 56098
