= It's Gonna Be Alright (Ruby Turner song) =

1989 single by Ruby Turner

Single by Ruby Turner

from the album Paradise
- B-side: "Sexy"
- Released: 1989
- Genre: R&B
- Length: 4:28
- Label: Jive
- Songwriter(s): Ruby Turner
- Producer(s): Loris Holland; Joylon Skinner

Ruby Turner singles chronology
"What Becomes of the Brokenhearted" (1989)	"It's Gonna Be Alright" (1989)	"Paradise" (1990)

"It's Gonna Be Alright" is a song written and performed by Jamaican contemporary R&B singer Ruby Turner, issued as the lead single from her third studio album Paradise. It contains a sample of "Keep On Movin'" by Soul II Soul. The song reached #1 on the Billboard R&B chart on February 17, 1990.

== Charts ==
=== Weekly charts ===
Chart (1990)	Peak position
New Zealand (Recorded Music NZ)	39
US Dance Club Songs (Billboard)	5
US Hot R&B/Hip-Hop Songs (Billboard)	1

UK: 57

=== Year-end charts ===
Chart (1990)	Position
US Hot R&B/Hip-Hop Songs (Billboard)	55

== Cover versions ==
- In 1991, the song was covered by Dutch entertainer Daisy Dee on her eponymous debut album.

== See also ==
- List of number-one R&B singles of 1990 (U.S.)

Preceded by "Real Love" by Skyy	Billboard Hot R&B/Hip-Hop Singles & Tracks number one single February 17, 1990	Succeeded by "Where Do We Go from Here" by Stacy Lattisaw featuring Johnny Gill
