= I'm Travelling On =

Studio album by Ruby Turner
- Released: 7 September 2009
- Recorded: 2009
- Studio: Bob Lamb Studios, Birmingham
- Genre: Soul, blues rock, gospel
- Label: Windsong Records

Ruby Turner chronology
The Informer (2008)	I'm Travelling On (2009)

I'm Travelling On is the 11th studio album by British soul singer Ruby Turner, released in 2009.

== Track listing ==
1. "All Aboard / This Train" (4:32)
2. "Get Away Jordan" (2:55)
3. "Old Ship of Zion" (3:18)
4. "I'm Travelling On" (4:21)
5. "Live So God Can Use You" (1:58)
6. "Strength, Power and Love" (4:15)
7. "The Love of God" (2:31)
8. "Oh Mary Don't You Weep" (2:58)
9. "Lord I Thank You" (3:00)
10. "Jesus on the Mainline" (2:58)
11. "Lead Me, Guide Me" (3:33)
12. "Take My Hand, Precious Lord" (3:11)
13. "Stand By Me" (2:09)
14. "Precious Memories" (2:16)
15. "The Love of God" {Band} (2:32)
16. "This Train" (Ash Howes Radio Mix) (3:16)

== Personnel ==
- Ruby Turner – vocals, backing vocals, producer
- Bob Lamb – producer
- Stephen Taylor – A&R
