= Back Door (album) =

1972 debut album by Back Door

Studio album by Back Door
- Released: 1972
- Recorded: 3–4 June 1972 in London, England
- Genres: Jazz fusion, progressive rock
- Length: 30:52
- Labels: Blakey (original); Warner Bros. (re-issue)

Back Door chronology
Back Door (1972)	8th Street Nites (1973)

Professional ratings
Review scores
Source	Rating
Allmusic	4.5/5 stars

Back Door is the eponymously titled debut studio album of Back Door, released independently in 1972 by Blakey Records. It received wider distribution when it was adopted by Warner Bros. the following year. It introduced the group's virtuoso approach to jazz, funk, soul, blues and hard rock music. In 2005, the album was listed on JazzTimes' top fifty albums released between 1970 and 2005. In 2014 it was re-released on CD, compiled with 8th Street Nites and Another Fine Mess, by BGO Records.

The original album cover shows a photograph of the back door of the Lion Inn at Blakey Ridge in the North York Moors. The Warner Brothers re-release shows the Lion Inn in the snow with a small inset picture of the band in front of the inn's back door.

The track "Catcote Rag" is a bass solo named after The Catcote, a pub in Hartlepool (now demolished) where Back Door played regularly.

“Slivadiv” was sampled by Beastie Boys as the intro to “Stand Together” on their 1992 album Check Your Head.

== Track listing ==
All music is composed by Ron Aspery and Colin Hodgkinson.

Side one
No.	Title	Length
1.	"Vienna Breakdown"	2:48
2.	"Plantagenet"	2:25
3.	"Lieutenant Loose"	1:55
4.	"Askin' the Way"	2:21
5.	"Turning Point"	3:03
6.	"Slivadiv"	2:50

Side two
No.	Title	Length
1.	"Jive Grind"	2:20
2.	"Human Bed"	1:39
3.	"Catcote Rag"	2:39
4.	"Waltz for a Wollum"	2:56
5.	"Folksong"	2:11
6.	"Back Door"	3:45

== Personnel ==
Adapted from the Back Door liner notes.

Back Door

- Ron Aspery – alto saxophone, soprano saxophone, flute
- Tony Hicks – drums
- Colin Hodgkinson – bass guitar

== Release history ==
Region	Date	Label	Format	Catalog
United Kingdom	1972	Blakey	LP	BLP. 5989
United Kingdom	1973	Warner Bros.	LP	K 46231
United States	1973	Warner Bros.	LP	BS 2716
Europe	2000	Warner Bros.	CD	936 247 759
