= Paradise (Ruby Turner album) =

Studio album by Ruby Turner
- Released: December 19, 1989
- Genre: R&B
- Label: Jive
- Producer: Jolyon Skinner, Loris Holland, Womack & Womack

Ruby Turner chronology
'The Motown Song Book' (1998)	Paradise (1989)	'The Other Side' (1991)

Singles from Paradise
- 1. "It's Gonna Be Alright" Released: 1989; 2. "Paradise" Released: 1990; 3. "It's a Cryin' Shame" Released: July 5, 1990

Professional ratings
Review scores
Source	Rating
AllMusic	2.5/5 stars

Paradise is the third studio album by Jamaican contemporary R&B singer Ruby Turner, released December 19, 1989 via Jive Records. It is her only album to date to chart on the Billboard 200, peaking at #194 in 1990. It also peaked at #39 on the Billboard R&B chart.

Three singles were released from the album: "It's Gonna Be Alright", "Paradise" and "It's a Cryin' Shame". "It's Gonna Be Alright" was the most successful single from the album, peaking at #1 on the Billboard R&B singles chart in 1990.

== Track listing ==
All music is composed by Loris Holland and Jolyon Skinner, except "Sexy" and "See Me" produced by Womack & Womack

No.	Title	Length
1.	"Paradise" (featuring Ecstasy)	4:30
2.	"It's Gonna Be Alright" ( (Note: "It's Gonna Be Alright" contains a sample of "Keep On Movin'" by Soul II Soul.))	4:28
3.	"It's a Cryin' Shame"	4:30
4.	"Leaves in the Wind"	4:56
5.	"There's No Better Love"	4:21
6.	"Everytime I Breathe"	4:39
7.	"Sexy"	3:56
8.	"See Me"	4:44
9.	"Surrender"	4:15
10.	"It's You My Heart Beats For"	4:29

== Chart positions ==
Chart (1990)	Peak position
US Billboard 200	194
US R&B Albums (Billboard)	39
