= Women Hold Up Half the Sky (album) =

Studio album by Ruby Turner
- Released: 1986
- Genres: Funk; soul; synthpop
- Label: Jive
- Producers: Bryan "Chuck" New; Billy Ocean; Monte Moir; Jon Astrop; Jolyon Skinner; Jonathan Butler; Pete Q. Harris; Womack & Womack

Ruby Turner chronology
Women Hold Up Half the Sky (1986)	Ruby Turner Live at Glastonbury (1986)

Professional ratings
Review scores
Source	Rating
AllMusic	3.5/5 stars

Women Hold Up Half the Sky is the debut solo studio album by British Jamaican singer Ruby Turner, released in 1986 by Jive Records.

== Singles ==
The album includes five singles which reached the UK Singles Chart: a cover of The Staple Singers song featuring Jonathan Butler, "If You're Ready (Come Go with Me)" (UK No. 30), "I'm in Love" (UK No. 61, No. 57 re-release), "Bye Baby" (UK No. 52), a cover of the Etta James standard "I'd Rather Go Blind" (UK No. 24) and "In My Life" (UK No. 95).

== Track listing ==
Side one
No.	Title	Writer(s)	Producer(s)	Length
1.	"If You're Ready (Come Go with Me)" (featuring Jonathan Butler)	Carl Hampton; Homer Banks; Raymond Jackson	Billy Ocean	4:27
2.	"In My Life (It's Better to Be in Love)"	Monte Moir	Monte Moir	4:42
3.	"A Woman Left Lonely"	Dan Penn; Spooner Oldham	Jon Astrop	4:45
4.	"Bye Baby"	Jolyon Skinner; Jonathan Butler	Skinner; Butler	4:39
5.	"I'd Rather Go Blind"	Billy Foster; Ellington Jordan	Pete Q. Harris	6:34

Side two
No.	Title	Writer(s)	Producer(s)	Length
6.	"I'm in Love"	Butler; Simon May	Bryan "Chuck" New	4:29
7.	"The Story of a Man and a Woman"	Michael Denne; Richard Jon Smith	New	4:50
8.	"Only Women Bleed"	Dick Wagner; Vincent Furnier	New	4:05
9.	"Still on My Mind"	Nigel Rickhards	Harris	3:39
10.	"He's Mine"	Butler; May	New	3:50
11.	"Hurting Inside"	Cecil Womack; Linda Womack	Womack & Womack	5:27

2010 Remastered Edition bonus tracks

12. "Won't Cry No More"
13. "I'm Livin' a Life of Love"
14. "If You're Ready (Come Go with Me)" (Extended Version)
15. "Ooo Baby Baby"
16. "In My Life (It's Better to Be in Love)" (Alternative Version)

== Charts ==
Chart	Peak position
New Zealand Albums Chart	4
UK Albums Chart	47
