= Maggie Bell =

Scottish singer

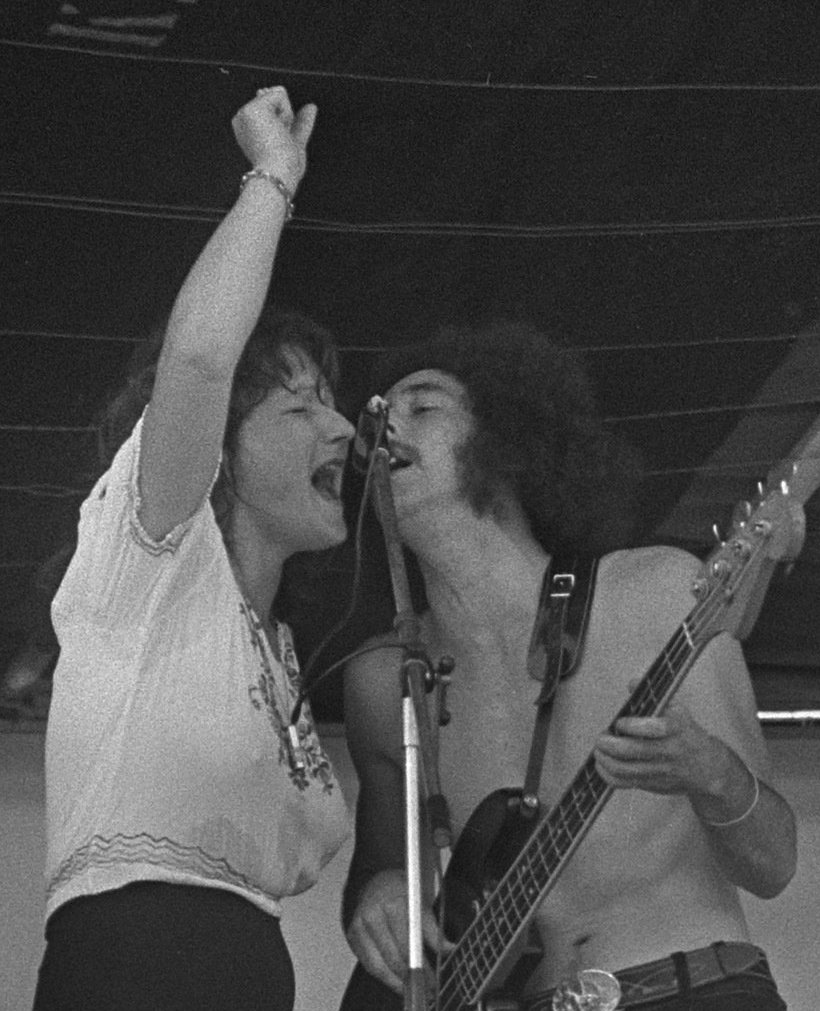
- Bell and James Dewar of Stone the Crows, 1970

Background information
- Born: Margaret Bell; 12 January 1945 (age 81); Maryhill, Glasgow, Scotland
- Genres: Rock, blues rock
- Occupation: Singer
- Years active: 1967–present
- Website: maggiebell.co.uk

Margaret Bell (born 12 January 1945) is a Scottish vocalist. She came to fame as co-lead vocalist of the blues rock group Stone the Crows, and was described as the UK's closest counterpart to American singer Janis Joplin. Bell was also prominently featured as a guest vocalist on the song "Every Picture Tells a Story" (1971) by Rod Stewart.

== Career ==
=== Early career ===
From a musical family, she sang from her teenage years, leaving school at the age of fifteen, to work as a window dresser by day and singer at night. Bell was introduced to Leslie Harvey, by his elder brother Alex, after getting up on stage to sing with the latter. Leslie Harvey was, at that time, a guitarist with the Kinning Park Ramblers. Bell joined the group as one of the vocalists. After the band split up, Bell moved to the Mecca Band at the Sauchiehall Street Locarno, and later to the Dennistoun Palais Band.

=== Power/Stone the Crows ===
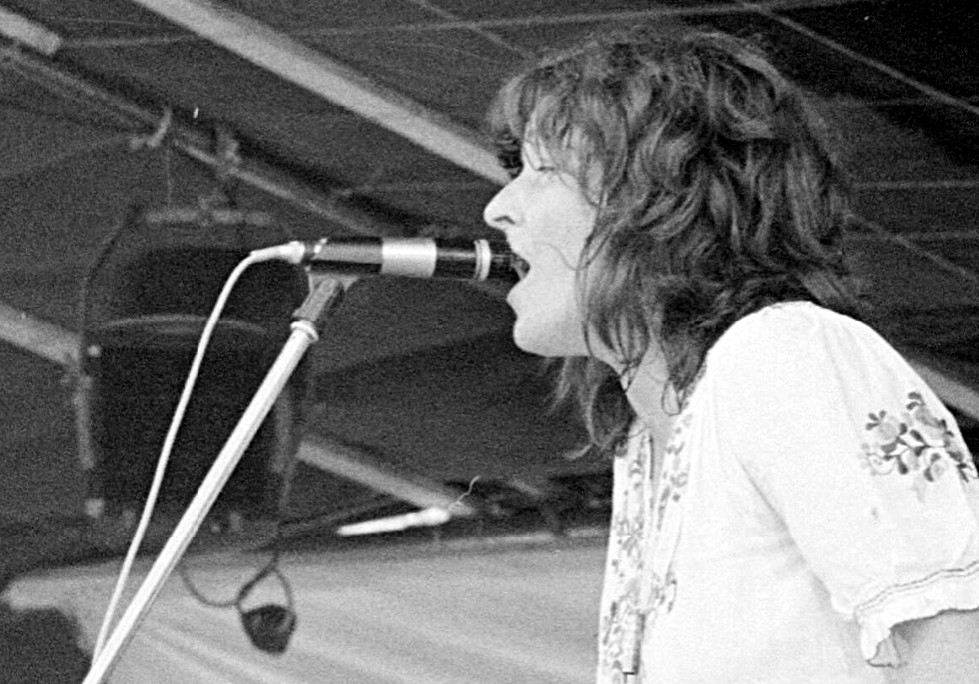
Bell with Stone the Crows in 1970

She then rejoined Harvey, forming Power, initially known as The Power of Music and eventually The Power. Bell and The Power regularly performed at The Easterhouse Project, run by Archie Hind and Graeme Noble. They also toured United States Air Force bases in Germany in the mid-1960s. Peter Grant, who was managing the Yardbirds at the time, heard Power playing at one of these bases and agreed to produce and manage them, impressed by the vocal ability of Bell and the guitar playing of Harvey. Power were then renamed as Stone the Crows, an expression used by Grant upon hearing this band.

=== First solo album ===
Stone the Crows split up in 1973, after Leslie Harvey's accidental death from electrocution on 3 May 1972. Harvey had been an integral part of the band and its music. Peter Grant remained as Bell's manager after the split, and along with Mark London offered to help Bell record a solo album. She subsequently recorded two further albums for Atlantic Records, one produced by Felix Pappalardi and the other produced by Felix Cavaliere. Neither has yet been released. Grant then oversaw her first solo album release, Queen of the Night (1974), which was recorded in New York City with record producer Jerry Wexler.

=== Swan Song and Midnight Flyer ===
Bell signed to the then newly formed Swan Song Records in 1974, along with Bad Company and Pretty Things, as one of the first signings to the label. Jimmy Page contributed to her second album Suicide Sal (1975). Bell then tried to capture past blues rock glories by fronting Midnight Flyer; they were a popular live act, but their sole eponymous album (released in 1981) was not a commercial success.

=== Solo again and B. A. Robertson ===
Returning to a solo career, she had her biggest hit in the UK in 1981 duetting with B. A. Robertson on a cover version of "Hold Me" which reached No. 11 on the UK Singles Chart. Bell also performed at many charity gigs during this period.

=== Television ===
While working with Stone the Crows, Bell was the subject of a BBC documentary in the 1972 Sounding Out series. Bell sang the end credits theme for the late 1970s ITV detective drama Hazell, with lyrics written by Judy Forrest and music by Andy Mackay. Her recording of the song "No Mean City", written by Mike Moran, was the theme music to the TV crime drama Taggart. She also appeared in a single episode of Taggart called "Evil Eye" in 1990, playing a gypsy fortune teller named Effie Lambie who is murdered early in the episode.

In 1990, she appeared in four episodes of the BBC drama series Your Cheatin' Heart.

In 2009, she provided the singing voice of rock singer Esme Ford (played by Joanna Lumley) in the episode "Counter Culture Blues" of the ITV series Lewis.

=== Netherlands and The British Blues Quintet ===
After living in the Netherlands for twenty years, Bell returned to the UK in early 2006 and joined The British Blues Quintet, sharing lead vocals with Zoot Money. Also featuring former Stone The Crows drummer Colin Allen and bassist Colin Hodgkinson, the band quickly became established on the UK and European live blues circuit. Their debut album, Live in Glasgow (2007), was recorded at one of their first gigs, on Glasgow's Renfrew Ferry in 2006. In addition, Bell toured with Chris Farlowe in the autumn of 2006 and The Manfreds during 2006 and 2008.

In January 2016, the Hamburg Blues Band featuring Maggie Bell and Krissy Matthews, performed at the Quasimodo Club in Berlin, Germany.

== Discography ==
=== With Stone the Crows (1968–1973) ===
- Stone the Crows (1970)
- Ode to John Law (1970)
- Teenage Licks (1971)
- Ontinuous Performance (1972)
- BBC Radio 1 1971/72 (1998)
- Coming On Strong (2004, also solo recordings)

=== Solo ===
- Two singles with Bobby Kerr as "Frankie and Johnny" (1966)
- Queen of the Night (1974)
- Suicide Sal (1975)
- Great Rock Sensation (1977, compilation)
- Crimes of the Heart (1988)
- Live at the Rainbow, 1974 (2002)
- Live in Boston, USA, 1975 (2002)
- Coming on Strong (2004, also with Stone The Crows)
- The River Sessions, Live in Glasgow 1993 (2004) with Ronnie Caryl, Paul Francis Bass
- Sound & Vision – Best of Maggie Bell (2008, compilation)

=== With Midnight Flyer ===
- Midnight Flyer (1981, re-release: Angel Air SJPCD 198, 2005)
- Live at Montreux 1981 (2007, CD/DVD)

=== With The British Blues Quintet ===
- Live at the Ferry (2007)

=== With Jon Lord Blues Project ===
- Jon Lord Blues Project Live (2011)

=== Singles ===
- "After Midnight" – 1974 – Number 97 US Atlantic Records
- "Hazell" – 1978 – Number 37 UK – Swan Song Records
- "Hold Me" – 1981 – B. A. Robertson and Maggie Bell – Number 11 UK – Swan Song Records
- "Everlasting Love" - 1987 - President Records

=== Guest appearances ===
- It Ain't Easy, Long John Baldry (accompanying vocal on duet "Black Girl"), 1971
- Every Picture Tells a Story, Rod Stewart, 1971
- Tommy, guest singer with London Symphony Orchestra and English Chamber Choir, 1972
- Banana Moon, Daevid Allen, 1971
- Brian Joseph Friel, Brian Joseph Friel, 1973
- Arrivederci Ardrossan, Brian Joseph Friel, 1975
- Hometown Girls, Denny Laine (one track: "Street"), 1985
- Crimes of Passion, Rick Wakeman (one track: "It's a Lovely Life"), 1986
- Les voix d'Itxassou, Tony Coe, (one track: "The Patriot Game"), 1989
- A Tribute to Frankie Miller, (one track: "Jealousy"), 2003
- Mad Dog Blues, Hamburg Blues Band (one track: "Wishing Well"), 2008
- In the Public Interest, Clem Clempson (several tracks), 2013

== Television appearances ==
- Pop Quiz (1983) as herself / contestant
- Taggart (1990) as "Effie Lambie"
- Your Cheatin' Heart (1990) as "Roxanne"
- Down Among the Big Boys (1993) as Jean Donnelly

== Other sources ==
- Logan, Nick & Woffinden, Bob (eds.) The New Musical Express Book of Rock, W.H. Allen &Co. Ltd (Star), 1973, p. 48. ISBN 0-352-39715-2.
- Welch, Chris (2002). Peter Grant: The Man Who Led Zeppelin. p. 23. ISBN 0-7119-9195-2.
- Yorke, Ritchie (1999). Led Zeppelin: From Early Days to Page and Plant. p. 192. ISBN 0-86369-744-5.
- Williamson, Nigel (2007). The Rough Guide to Led Zeppelin. p. 110. ISBN 978-1-84353-841-7.
