= The Boy in the Sailor Suit =

Studio album by Dave Cousins
- Released: June 2007
- Recorded: April 23, 2007 – April 28, 2007
- Genres: folk-rock, singer-songwriter
- Length: 48:49
- Label: Witchwood Media
- Producer: Chris Tsangarides

Dave Cousins chronology
Two Weeks Last Summer (1972)	The Boy in the Sailor Suit (2007)	Secret Paths (2008)

Professional ratings
Review scores
Source	Rating
Allmusic	link

The Boy in the Sailor Suit is a studio album by Dave Cousins.

== Track listing ==
All songs written by Dave Cousins except where noted

1. "Never Take Sweets from a Stranger" – (4:41)
2. "Mellow Moon" – (6:19)
3. "The Smile You Left Behind" – (3:08)
4. "Calling Out My Name" – (5:11)
5. "Mother Luck" – (4:16)
6. "Wish You were Here" – (5:19)
7. "Skip to my Lou" (Cousins, Conny Conrad) – (4:50)
8. "Lonely Days, Lonely Nights" (Cousins, Conrad) – (4:55)
9. "Bringing in the Harvest" – (4:36)
10. "Hellfire Blues" – (5:42)

== Personnel ==
- Dave Cousins – vocals, acoustic guitar
- Miller Anderson – guitar
- Ian Cutler – fiddle
- Chas Cronk – bass guitar
- Chris Hunt – drums

with guests

- Elizabeth Tophill – backing vocals
- Frances Tophill – backing vocals
- Tony Attwood – organ on track 9
- Chris Ball – piano on track 10

== Recording ==
- Chris Tsangarides – producer, engineer
- Chas Cronk – mastering

Recorded at The Ecology Rooms, Kent April 23, 2007 – April 28, 2007.

== Release history ==
Region	Date	Label	Format	Catalog
	June 2007	Witchwood Media	CD	WMCD 2040
