= Ruby Turner =

British Jamaican singer, songwriter, and actress (born 1958)

Ruby Turner MBE
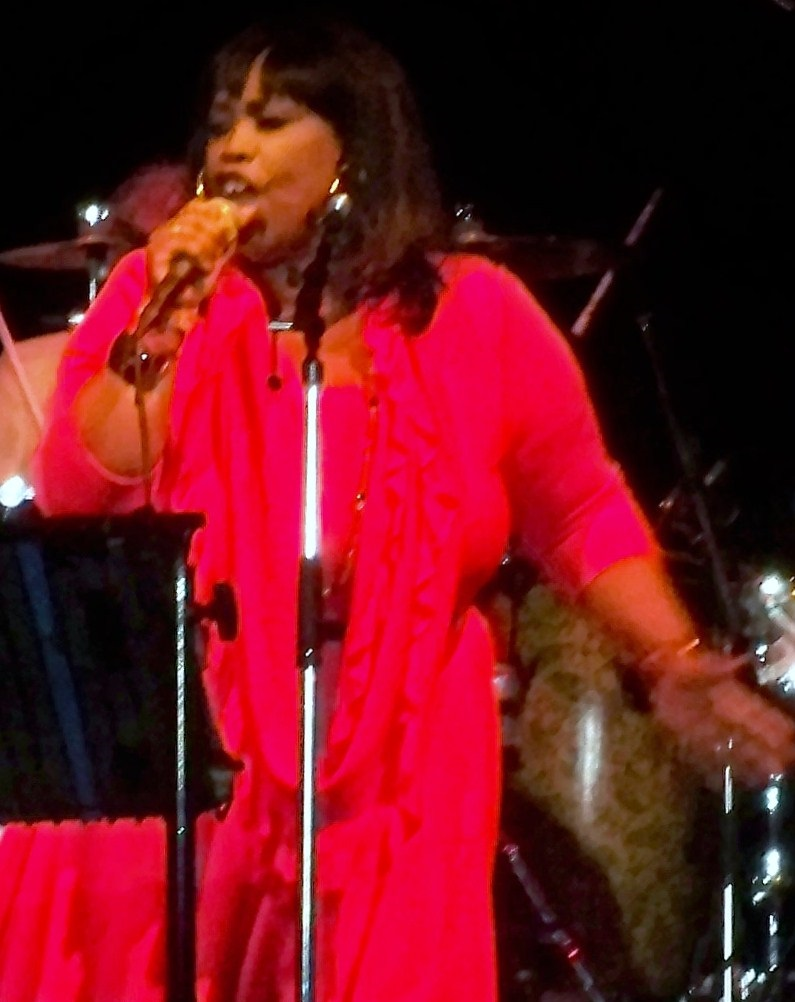
- Turner performing live at GuilFest in 2012

Background information
- Born: 22 June 1958 (age 68); Montego Bay, Jamaica
- Origin: Birmingham, England
- Genres: R&B; Pop; Soul; Gospel; Boogie-woogie
- Occupations: Singer; songwriter; actress
- Instruments: Vocals
- Years active: 1983–present
- Labels: Jive; Indigo
- Website: Official website

Francella Ruby Turner MBE (born 22 June 1958) is a British Jamaican R&B and soul singer, songwriter, and actress.

In a music career spanning more than 40 years, Turner is best known for her album and single releases in Europe and North America. She is also known for her work as a session backing vocalist, with artists including Bryan Ferry, UB40, Steel Pulse, Steve Winwood, Jools Holland, Corey Hart and Mick Jagger. She has also written songs that have been covered by musicians including Lulu, Yazz and Maxi Priest.

Turner achieved the rare feat, for a British singer, of reaching No. 1 on the US R&B chart, with "It's Gonna Be Alright" in February 1990. Between 1986 and 1995, eight of her singles appeared in the UK Singles Chart with "I'd Rather Go Blind" being the most successful, reaching No. 24 in 1987. Turner performed at the Birmingham Heart Beat 86 concert, which featured George Harrison. She is a regular guest on BBC Television's Jools' Annual Hootenanny, performing every year from 2007 to the present, and she regularly joins Holland and his bqand on their annual arena tours. She has also appeared as an actress on stage, film and television.

== Biography ==
=== Early years ===
Ruby Turner was born in Montego Bay, Jamaica, and moved at the age of nine with her family to Handsworth, Birmingham, England, in 1967.

Turner came from a musical family as her grandfather sang the lead in one of Jamaica's gospel groups. In the early 1980s, she worked with Culture Club at the height of their popularity. She received an offer of a solo recording contract soon afterwards and signed to Jive Records, part of the Zomba Group.

=== Music career ===
Turner achieved her solo recording contract with Jive Records after singing backing vocals on Culture Club's From Luxury to Heartache. She released four albums and a "Best of" Compilation Album over the next few years. Her first solo album Women Hold Up Half the Sky, was released in 1986 to critical acclaim and produced hit singles such as a cover version of the Staple Singers song "If You're Ready (Come Go with Me)", a duet with Jonathan Butler, and the Etta James standard "I'd Rather Go Blind".

In March 1987, Turner sang on the Ferry Aid single, "Let It Be". Around this time she also released the album The Motown Songbook, on which she performed with Motown and others, including the Four Tops, the Temptations and Jimmy Ruffin. In 1988, Turner appeared on Corey Hart's album, Young Man Running on 2 duets "Spot You in a Coalmine" and "In Your Soul"

Turner achieved a no. 1 R&B chart success in the US in February 1990 with "It's Gonna Be Alright", becoming one of the few British artists to top that chart. Four other US R&B chart entries followed in 1990 and 1991, including "Paradise" from the movie Dancin' Thru the Dark.

In 1998, she recorded the album Call Me by My Name with British rhythm and blues veterans Boz Burrell, Zoot Money, Bobby Tench and Stan Webb. On New Year's Eve 1999, she sang the National Anthem for Queen Elizabeth II, who was accompanied by Prime minister Tony Blair and other dignitaries at the opening of the Millennium Dome, in London.

Turner sang backing vocals on Mick Jagger's 2001 album, Goddess in the Doorway, and performed "Nobody But You" on the 2002 album Jools Holland's Big Band Rhythm & Blues. In 2007, Turner presented a documentary Shout Sister Shout about Sister Rosetta Tharpe for BBC Radio 2. She sang on Seasick Steve's album, I Started Out with Nothin and I Still Got Most of It Left (2008). In September 2009, Turner released her first gospel music album, I'm Travelling On. Her rendition of "Jesus on the Mainline" appears on a compilation CD that accompanied the book British Black Gospel by Steve Alexander Smith.

On 28 October 2009 Turner was presented with a BASCA Gold Badge Award in recognition of her unique contribution to music.

On 4 June 2012, Turner was one of the performers at the Diamond Jubilee Concert outside Buckingham Palace in London, where she joined Jools Holland on stage.

On 4 June 2022, Turner performed Climb Ev'ry Mountain with Mica Paris and Nicola Roberts at the Platinum Party at the Palace concert to celebrate the Platinum Jubilee of Queen Elizabeth II.

Turner was awarded an MBE in the 2016 Birthday Honours for services to music.

=== Acting ===
As an actress, Turner has appeared in productions of A Streetcar Named Desire, Carmen Jones, and Fame. She has also appeared in One Love, by Kwame Davies, at the London's Lyric Theatre, Hammersmith. She appeared in a successful run in the London West End production of the musical Simply Heavenly, which was nominated for 'Outstanding Musical' at the 2005 Laurence Olivier Awards.

Turner has appeared in a number of films, including Love Actually (2003), Reggae Britannia (2011) and Famous Fred (1996). In 2006 Turner made an appearance in Little Britain Abroad, where she played the Sheriff Judy. On 12 October 2007, she appeared as a guest star (as herself) in the BBC One soap opera Doctors. The episode title was entitled "Raising The Roof". In 2009, Turner appeared in the BBC drama Hotel Babylon.

In 2011, Turner narrated the BBC Four documentary Reggae Britannia, which chronicled the history of British reggae music. In 2012, Turner, along with Ralph Allwood and Manvinder Rattan, was a judge on the BBC Two series The Choir: Sing While You Work. In 2013, Turner was a guest judge on the BBC Songs of Praise gospel choir competition. In 2015, it was announced that she would appear as Mrs. Blip in the made-for-TV movie The Land of Sometimes.

== Personal life ==
Turner has been engaged twice, but not married and has said "Many women I know, must have a man in their life. ... They seem programmed to find a man and must get married. Marriage is a priority for them. Not for me. I am not built that way. I have never felt I had to have a man in my life, or have to end up married."

Her parents are separated and her father lives in the US. Her mother Violetta lives near Turner and sang on her 2009 album I'm Travelling On.

== Discography ==
=== Albums ===
Year	Title	Peak chart positions				Certifications
Year	Title	UK	AUS	US 200	US R&B	Certifications
1986	Women Hold Up Half the Sky	47	—	—	—	BPI: Silver
1986	Ruby Turner Live at Glastonbury	—	—	—	—	
1988	The Motown Songbook	22	111	—	—	BPI: Silver
1989	Paradise	74	—	194	39	
1991	The Other Side	—	182	—	—	
1992	The Best of Ruby Turner (compilation)	—	—	—	—	
1993	Responsible	—	—	—	—	
1993	With Love (compilation)	—	—	—	—	
1994	Restless Moods	—	144	—	—	
1995	The Best of Ruby Turner (compilation)	—	—	—	—	
1996	Guilty	—	—	—	—	
1998	Call Me by My Name	—	—	—	—	
2001	Live in Bristol	—	—	—	—	
2005	So Amazing	—	—	—	—	
2007	Live at Ronnie Scott's (double live album)	—	—	—	—	
2008	The Informer (with Jools Holland)	—	—	—	—	
2009	I'm Travelling On	—	—	—	—	
2014	All That I Am	—	—	—	—	
2015	Jools & Ruby (with Jools Holland)	39	—	—	—	
2017	Livin' a Life of Love - The Jive Anthology 1986–1991	—	—	—	—	
2018	That's My Desire	—	—	—	—	
2020	Love Was Here	—	—	—	—	
"—" denotes releases that did not chart or were not released.

=== Singles ===
Year	Single	Peak chart positions				Album
Year	Single	UK	NZ	US R&B	US Dance	Album
1980	"Separate Ways" (Ruby Turner Band)	—	—	—	—	Singles only
1983	"Every Soul"	—	—	—	—	Singles only
1986	"If You're Ready (Come Go with Me)" (feat. Jonathan Butler)	30	3	58	—	Women Hold Up Half the Sky
1986	"I'm in Love"	61	9	—	—	Women Hold Up Half the Sky
1986	"Bye Baby"	52	10	—	—	Women Hold Up Half the Sky
1987	"I'd Rather Go Blind"	24	21	—	—	Women Hold Up Half the Sky
1987	"I'm in Love" (UK re-issue)	57	—	—	—	Women Hold Up Half the Sky
1987	"In My Life (It's Better to Be in Love)" (UK only)	95	—	—	—	Women Hold Up Half the Sky
1988	"Signed, Sealed, Delivered I'm Yours"	77	8	—	—	The Motown Song Book
1988	"What Becomes of the Broken Hearted" (feat. Jimmy Ruffin)	87	41	—	—	The Motown Song Book
1988	"Nowhere to Run (Nowhere to Hide)" (US only)	—	—	—	—	The Motown Song Book
1988	"Soul Set (Baby I Need Your Loving)"	—	—	—	—	The Motown Song Book
1990	"It's Gonna Be Alright"	57	39	1	5	Paradise
1990	"Paradise" (feat. Ecstasy of Whodini)	—	36	22	—	Paradise
1990	"It's a Crying Shame"	—	—	29	—	Paradise
1991	"The Other Side" (US only)	—	—	34	—	The Other Side
1991	"The Vibe Is Right" (UK/Europe only)	90	—	—	—	The Other Side
1991	"Rumours"	—	—	80	—	The Other Side
1992	"Good Love" (Que featuring Ruby Turner)	—	—	—	—	Singles only
1993	"Lysander's Theme (Lovers After All)" (Ruby Turner & Junior Giscombe)	—	—	—	—	Singles only
1994	"Stay with Me"	39	—	—	—	Restless Moods
1994	"Living for the City"	92	28	—	—	Responsible
1995	"Never Ever Gonna Give You Up"	—	—	—	—	Restless Moods
1995	"The Club Diamonds EP" (Lead track "Change")	84	—	—	—	Restless Moods
1995	Walk On By (The Cartell featuring Ruby Turner)	—	—	—	—	Single only
1998	"Reassure Me"	—	—	—	—	Call Me by My Name
1998	"We Got It Going On" (Mover featuring Ruby Turner)	93	—	—	—	Mover (Mover)
2000	"Chinese Whispers" (Full Flava featuring Ruby Turner)	—	—	—	—	Chinese Whispers (Full Flava)
2000	"Pokeball" (Corfu featuring Ruby Turner and Michael Dread with The Children of Wraxall C.E.V.A School)	—	—	—	—	Single only
2009	"This Train (Ash Howes Radio Mix 2009)"	—	—	—	—	I'm Travelling On
2011	"Leaves in the Wind"	—	—	—	—	Paradise
2014	"Move On"	—	—	—	—	All That I Am
2015	"Putting You First"	—	—	—	—	All That I Am
2015	"Peace in the Valley" (Jools Holland and Ruby Turner)	—	—	—	—	Jools & Ruby (Jools & Ruby and the Rhythm and Blues Orchestra)
2017	"Deeper in Love" (Tilt featuring Ruby Turner)	—	—	—	—	Single only
"—" denotes releases that did not chart or were not released.

== See also ==
- R&B number-one hits of 1990 (USA)
- List of artists who reached number one on the Billboard R&B chart
- List of performers on Top of the Pops
