= Secret Paths (album) =

Studio album by Dave Cousins
- Released: March 3, 2008
- Recorded: 2008
- Genre: Folk rock
- Label: Witchwood Media
- Producer: Chris Tsangarides

Dave Cousins chronology
The Boy in the Sailor Suit (2007)	Secret Paths (2008)	Duochrome (2008)

Professional ratings
Review scores
Source	Rating
Allmusic	3.5/5 stars

Secret Paths is a studio album by Dave Cousins.

== Track listing ==
All songs written by Dave Cousins except where noted.

1. "Song of a Sad Little Girl"
2. "Plainsong"
3. "The Shepherd's Song"
4. "I Turned My face into the Wind"
5. "Ringing Down the Years"
6. "Josephine (For Better or for Worse)"
7. "Canada"
8. "How I Need You Now"
9. "I'll Show You Where to Sleep"
10. "Beat the Retreat"
11. "Falling in Love Again" (Frederick Hollander, Sammy Lerner)

== Personnel ==
- Dave Cousins – vocals, acoustic guitar, banjo, dulcimer
- Melvin Duffy – steel guitar

== Recording ==
- Chris Tsangarides – producer

== Release history ==
Region	Date	Label	Format	Catalog
	March 3, 2008	Witchwood Media	CD	WMCD 2042
