= Duochrome (album) =

Live album by Dave Cousins
- Released: October 2008
- Recorded: 2008
- Genre: Folk rock
- Length: 55:54
- Label: Witchwood Media

Dave Cousins chronology
Secret Paths (2008)	Duochrome (2008)

Duochrome is a live album by Dave Cousins. It was originally released as a bonus disc for the first 1000 buyers of the Strawbs album The Broken Hearted Bride through their label's online shop. Popular demand prompted an independent release later that year.

== Track listing ==
All tracks written by Dave Cousins.

1. "Hanging in the Gallery" (4:39)
2. "Never Take Sweets from a Stranger" (3:47)
3. "Song of a Sad Little Girl" (4:49)
4. "The Hangman and the Papist" (4:08)
5. "Grace Darling" (5:30)
6. "Beat the Retreat" (5:03)
7. "Ringing Down the Years" (6:36)
8. "The Shepherd's Song" (4:52)
9. "Ways and Means" (4:24)
10. "Blue Angel" (10:34)
11. "We'll Meet Again Sometime" (5:56)
12. "Beside the Rio Grande" (5:05)

== Personnel ==
- Dave Cousins – vocals, acoustic guitar
- Ian Cutler – violin (tracks 7 to 11)
- Chas Cronk – mastering

== Release history ==
Region	Date	Label	Format	Catalog
	October 2008	Witchwood Media	CD	WMCD 2043
