= Activate (album) =

Studio album by Back Door
- Released: 1976
- Genre: Jazz fusion
- Length: 36:11
- Label: Warner Bros.
- Producer: Carl Palmer

Back Door chronology
Another Fine Mess (1975)	Activate (1976)	The Human Bed (2002)

Activate is the fourth studio album by Back Door, released in 1976 by Warner Bros. Records. It was produced by Carl Palmer, known for his drumming in the bands Atomic Rooster and ELP. Original member Tony Hicks had left the band before recording the album and had been replaced by Adrian Tilbrook on drums. After the release of Activate, the band played less and less together, and eventually broke up around 1977.

== Track listing ==
All tracks are written by Ron Aspery and Colin Hodgkinson, except "Thru the Zig Zag Gate", "Train Won't Blow" and "Eliminate" co-written with Adrian Tilbrook.

Side one
No.	Title	Length
1.	"You Got Evil"	3:40
2.	"Thru the Zig Zag Gate"	2:47
3.	"Train Won't Blow"	6:48
4.	"Dragonfly"	2:41
5.	"Eliminate"	3:07

Side two
No.	Title	Length
1.	"Speedwalker"	4:50
2.	"Roll On"	2:12
3.	"Moon Mad Woman"	5:46
4.	"Cryin' Inside"	4:20

== Personnel ==
Adapted from the Activate liner notes.

Back Door

- Ron Aspery – alto saxophone, baritone saxophone, soprano saxophone, acoustic piano, electric piano, Mellotron, organ, arrangements
- Colin Hodgkinson – bass guitar, fretless bass guitar, electric guitar, twelve-string guitar, vocals, arrangements
- Adrian Tilbrook – drums

Production and additional personnel

- Andy Hendriksen – engineering
- Mustard – cover art
- Carl Palmer – production

== Release history ==
Region	Date	Label	Format	Catalog
United Kingdom	1976	Warner Bros.	LP	K 56243
