= 8th Street Nites =

Studio album by Back Door
- Released: 1973
- Recorded: June 1973
- Studio: Electric Lady Studios
- Genre: Jazz fusion, progressive rock
- Length: 34:57
- Label: Warner Bros.
- Producer: Felix Pappalardi

Back Door chronology
Back Door (1972)	8th Street Nites (1973)	Another Fine Mess (1975)

Professional ratings
Review scores
Source	Rating
Allmusic	4.5/5 stars

8th Street Nites is the second studio album by Back Door, released in 1973 by Warner Bros. Records. It was recorded at Electric Lady Studios in New York and produced by Felix Pappalardi, famous for his production of Cream and playing in the American rock band, Mountain.

In 2014 it was re-released on CD, compiled with Back Door and Another Fine Mess, by BGO Records.

== Track listing ==
Side one
No.	Title	Writer(s)	Length
1.	"Linin' Track"	Ledbetter (Lead Belly)	4:01
2.	"Forget Me Daisy"	Ron Aspery, Colin Hodgkinson	2:14
3.	"His Old Boots"	Ron Aspery, Colin Hodgkinson	3:21
4.	"Blue Country Blues"	Ron Aspery, Colin Hodgkinson	2:47
5.	"Dancin' in the Van"	Ron Aspery, Tony Hicks, Colin Hodgkinson	1:52
6.	"32-20 Blues"	Robert Johnson	2:25

Side two
No.	Title	Writer(s)	Length
1.	"Roberta"	Ledbetter (Lead Belly)	2:50
2.	"It's Nice When It's Up"	Ron Aspery, Colin Hodgkinson	2:25
3.	"One Day You're Down, The Next Day Your Down"	Ron Aspery, Colin Hodgkinson	3:33
4.	"Walkin' Blues"	Son House	3:15
5.	"The Bed Creaks Louder"	Ron Aspery, Colin Hodgkinson	2:21
6.	"Adolphus Beal"	Ron Aspery, Colin Hodgkinson	3:53

== Personnel ==
Adapted from the 8th Street Nites liner notes.

Back Door

- Ron Aspery – alto saxophone, soprano saxophone, flute, electric piano
- Tony Hicks – drums
- Colin Hodgkinson – bass guitar, vocals

Production and additional personnel

- Bob D'Orleans – engineering
- Tom Hummer – assistant engineer
- Robert McFarlane – photography
- Felix Pappalardi – production, tambourine (A1), electric piano (A2), percussion (B4)

== Release history ==
Region	Date	Label	Format	Catalog
United Kingdom	1973	Warner Bros.	LP	K 46265
United States	1973	Warner Bros.	LP	BS 2753
Europe	2000	Warner Bros.	CD	936,247,761
