= Zoot Money =

English musician (1942–2024)

Background information
- Born: George Bruno Money; 17 July 1942; Bournemouth, Dorset, England
- Died: 8 September 2024 (aged 82)
- Genres: R&B; soul; jazz; rock
- Occupations: Musician; singer; songwriter; actor
- Instruments: Keyboards; vocals
- Years active: 1960–2024
- Labels: Columbia; Indigo; MPL
- Formerly of: Zoot Money's Big Roll Band; Dantalian's Chariot; The Animals
- Website: Zootmoney.org

George Bruno "Zoot" Money (17 July 1942 – 8 September 2024) was an English vocalist, keyboardist and bandleader. A Hammond organ player, he was the leader of the Big Roll Band. Inspired by Jerry Lee Lewis and Ray Charles, Money was drawn to rock and roll music and became involved in the music scenes of Bournemouth and Soho during the 1960s. He took his stage name "Zoot" from Zoot Sims after seeing him perform in concert.

Money was associated with the Animals, Eric Burdon, Peter Green, Steve Marriott, Kevin Coyne, Kevin Ayers, Humble Pie, Steve Ellis, Alexis Korner, Snowy White, Mick Taylor, Spencer Davis, Vivian Stanshall, Geno Washington, Brian Friel, Hard Travelers, Widowmaker, Georgie Fame and Alan Price. He also became a bit part and character actor in films and TV. and was musical director for the 1987 BBC Scotland drama series Tutti Frutti.

== Early life ==
George Bruno Money was born in Bournemouth, Dorset on 17 July 1942, the youngest of four children of Italian parents, Oscar and Maria. His father, a hotel waiter, had escaped from Italy to England after Mussolini's rise to power.

Money was obsessed with music from an early age. At Portchester School in Charminster he sang in the choir and learned to play the French horn. In his mid-teens he formed a skiffle group called the Four Ales. In 1958, when he was 14, his elder brother bought tickets for a jazz concert in Bournemouth which featured American saxophonist Zoot Sims, from whom Money took his stage name. He formed the six-piece Portchester Road Jazz Band, in which he played banjo. After leaving school he took up a four-year apprenticeship with an optician and continued to play in bands.

== Music career ==
=== Big Roll Band and Dantalian's Chariot ===
In 1961 Money, "cherry-picking the best musicians in Bournemouth's other rock'n'roll groups", formed the Big Roll Band with himself as vocalist, Roger Collis on lead guitar, pianist Al Kirtley (later of Trendsetters Limited), bassist Mike "Monty" Montgomery and drummer Johnny Hammond. Money named the Big Roll Band after a line he mis-heard, "And you will be the leader of a big old band", in the Chuck Berry song "Johnny B. Goode". Their first public performance was on Sunday 12 November 1961 at The Downstairs Club in Bournemouth. Kirtley recalled Money as "a flamboyant frontman and a natural leader". In 1962 drummer Pete Brookes replaced Hammond, bassist Johnny King replaced Montgomery and tenor sax player Kevin Drake joined the band. Kirtley left shortly afterwards and Money took over on organ.

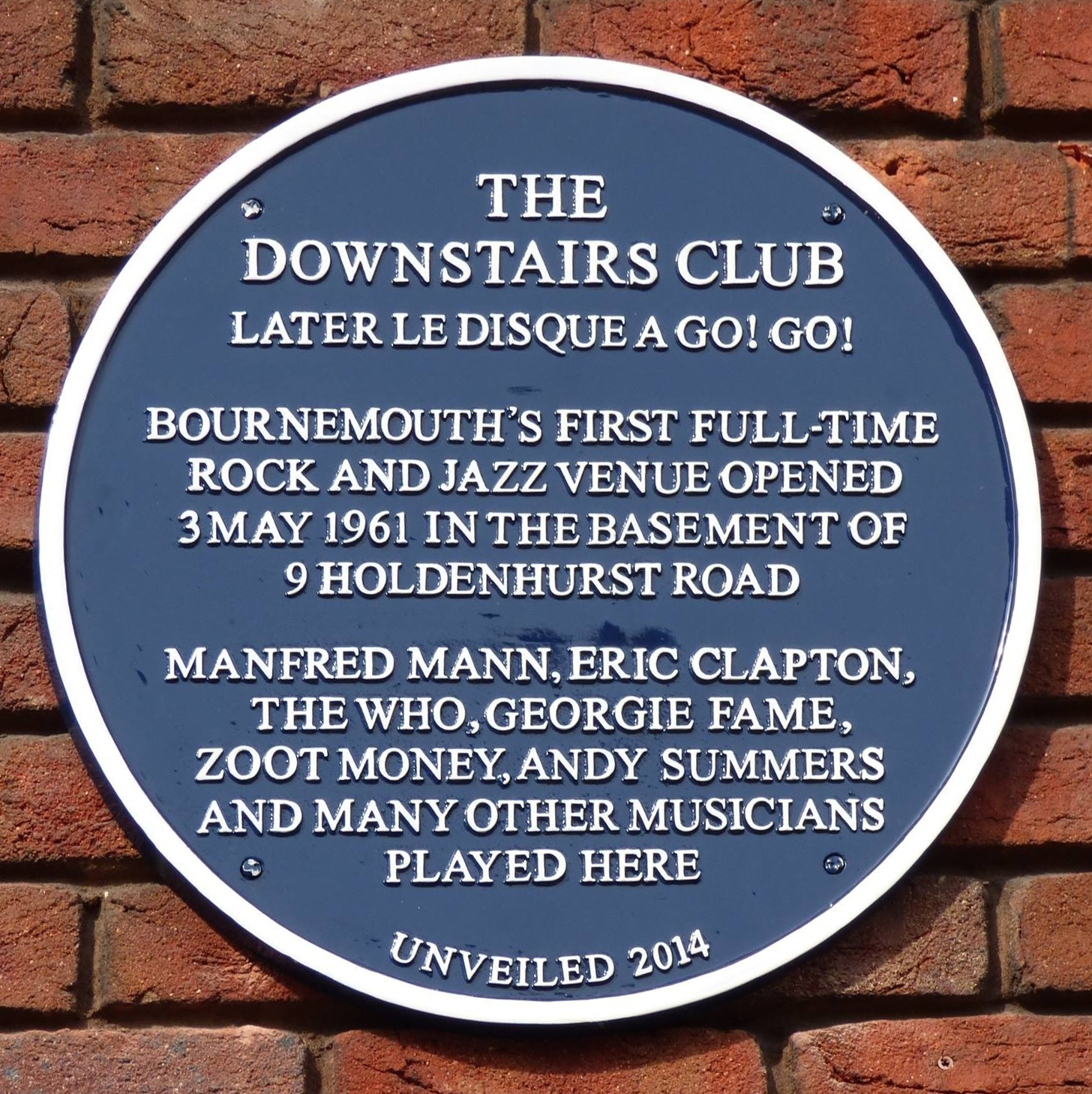
Plaque at The Downstairs Club, Bournemouth

In its later line-up of Money on organ and vocals, Andy Summers (who later became a member of the Police) on guitar, Nick Newall and Clive Burrows (and later Johnny Almond) on saxophones, Paul Williams on bass and occasional vocals, and Colin Allen on drums, the Big Roll Band played soul, jazz and R&B, following musical trends as the established R&B movement moved into the Swinging Sixties and became associated with the burgeoning "Soho scene" in London. Money's exuberant stage presence and antics as a frontman became a feature of the band's act in London clubs. In 1964 the Big Roll Band started playing regularly at the Flamingo Club in Soho. Money also briefly joined Alexis Korner's Blues Incorporated, playing Hammond organ. The Big Roll Band released eight singles between 1964 and 1966. On 17 September 1966, Money with the band reached No. 25 in the UK singles charts, with "Big Time Operator" and the band made regular appearances on the ITV music show Ready Steady Go! Zoot!, the most successful of the band's two albums, recorded live at Klooks Kleek in London, reached no.23 in the UK album charts in late 1966.

In July 1967 the Big Roll Band became Dantalian's Chariot, named in the esoteric mid-1960's after a devil in a mediaeval treatise on witchcraft, and with one of the earliest psychedelic light shows the band became regular performers at London's hippy underground clubs UFO and Middle Earth. The band's 1967 single "Madman Running Through the Fields" (B-side "Sun Came Bursting Through My Cloud"), in the style of early Pink Floyd, was popular in the era of LSD-enhanced listening, and despite a lack of chart success the band found itself at the heart of a new counterculture, sharing concert line-ups with Pink Floyd, Soft Machine and the Crazy World of Arthur Brown. In April 1968 Dantalian's Chariot was disbanded.

The album Chariot Rising was released in 1996, comprising both sides of the 1967 single and eight other unreleased studio recordings. It is available on CD.

=== 1968–1978 ===
In 1968 Money moved to the United States to join Eric Burdon & the New Animals in time for their Every One of Us album. The Animals incorporated extended psychedelic versions of Dantalian's Chariot favourites "Madman Running Through the Fields" and "Gemini" into their setlist. Big Roll Band and Dantalian's Chariot colleague Andy Summers joined them for the recording of the album Love Is in 1968. The New Animals broke up shortly afterwards and Money returned to his R&B roots, recording and releasing a solo LP, Welcome to my Head, in 1969 and playing sessions for, among others, Long John Baldry and Lonnie Donegan. He returned to the UK in 1970 and contributed piano to the improvised studio sessions led by former Fleetwood Mac guitarist Peter Green which became Green's experimental The End of the Game album. In the 1970s Money played and recorded with the poetry and rock band Grimms, and with Ellis, Centipede, Kevin Ayers and Kevin Coyne.

In the late 1970s Money developed an acting career and had bit-parts in TV shows which included Bergerac, The Bill and EastEnders. In EastEnders he played the part of an ageing rocker named Johnny Earthquake. He appeared in the film adaptation of Ronnie Barker's Porridge in 1979, played a music industry PR in Breaking Glass in 1980, and in 1986 was a barman in Absolute Beginners.

=== Solo album and Majik Mijits ===
Money signed to Paul McCartney's record label MPL Communications in 1980 and recorded Mr. Money, produced by Jim Diamond. In 1981 Steve Marriott and Ronnie Lane formed a band with Money, bass player Jim Leverton, drummer Dave Hynes and saxophone player Mel Collins to record the album The Majic Mijits. The album featured songs by Lane and Marriott, but because of Lane's multiple sclerosis they were unable to tour to promote it. It was eventually released nineteen years later.

=== 1987–1998 ===
In 1987 Money was musical director for the BBC Scotland drama series Tutti Frutti and he wrote the theme music. In 1985 he wrote the incidental music for five episodes of the TV series Adventures Beyond Belief. From 1990 to 1994 he was music controller for Melody Radio. In 1994 Money recorded with Alan Price and the Electric Blues Company alongside vocalist and guitarist Bobby Tench, bassist Peter Grant and drummer Martin Wild, on A Gigster's Life for Me. He continued to appear with Price at live appearances in the UK. The Dantalian's Chariot album Chariot Rising was released in 1997, thirty years after it was recorded, produced and re-mastered by Gary Whitford. In 1998 Money produced Ruby Turner's album Call Me by My Name.

=== 2002–2005 ===
Money produced the Woodstock Taylor album Road Movie (2002) and contributed keyboards. In 2002 he recorded tracks with Humble Pie for their album Back on Track, released by Sanctuary Records. In 2003 Money featured on the British 'Legends of Rhythm and Blues' UK tour alongside Long John Baldry, Ray Dorset and Paul Williams. Money joined Pete Goodall to re-record the Thunderclap Newman UK hit single Something in the Air (2004) written by John "Speedy" Keene, which featured the last recorded performance by saxophonist Dick Heckstall-Smith. In 2005 Money joined Goodall to record a CD of new songs by Goodall and Pete Brown and they toured the UK under the name Good Money. In early 2006 Money and drummer Colin Allen joined vocalist Maggie Bell, bassist Colin Hodgkinson and guitarist Miller Anderson, in the British Blues Quintet.

=== After 2008 ===
Money appeared with the RD Crusaders for the Teenage Cancer Trust at the London International Music Show on 15 June 2008. In 2009 he appeared with Maggie Bell, Bobby Tench, Chris Farlowe and Alan Price in the 'Maximum Rhythm and Blues Tour' of thirty-two British theatres. Money joined the British Blues All Stars in 2014 and appeared with the Big Roll Band at The Bull's Head in Barnes, London.

== Music legacy ==
In an article written for The Guardian after Money's death Elton John stated, "I started thinking about the Hammond organ the other day, after Zoot Money died. He was one of those people who knew exactly what to do with it, who could make it growl and soar and sing. His death didn’t pass unnoticed but the coverage didn’t really reflect what a big deal Zoot Money’s Big Roll Band were in the 60s. They were a huge draw in the clubs: mods loved them. After he died, I listened to their version of The Cat, an old soul-jazz instrumental by Jimmy Smith that was a real standard on the club scene at the time: everyone played it, Bluesology included. We did it so often that, without thinking, I started miming along to it, playing the melody line with my right hand on the dining table. It must be nearly 60 years since I performed that song live, and I still remembered how to play it. But I couldn’t play it the way Zoot Money did, then or now. He was something special".

== Marriage and death ==
Money married Veronica ('Ronni') Nicolson in London in 1967. She predeceased him in 2017.

He died on 8 September 2024, at the age of 82. He was survived by a daughter and two sons.

== Acting career ==
Money began attracting acting roles in the 1970s and started an acting career with character appearances in film and television dramas.

=== Film appearances ===
- Red Hair, one of Leonard Rossiter's fellow commuters, in the 1978 short film The Waterloo Bridge Handicap
- Lotterby in the 1979 film Porridge
- a promotions man in the 1980 UK film Breaking Glass
- a music-publishing executive in the 1981 Madness film Take It or Leave It
- Dorking, alongside Eddie Kidd in the 1981 film Riding High
- Chalky White in the 1983 film Bullshot
- a pirate in the 1983 film The Pirates of Penzance
- a party guest in the 1984 film Supergirl
- the first taxi driver in the 1984 film Scandalous
- Supersonic Sam in the 1985 film Billy the Kid and the Green Baize Vampire
- Chez Nobody Barman in the 1986 film Absolute Beginners

In 2000 he starred in a film based on guitarist Syd Barrett, as a fanatical fan stalking the rock star Roger Bannerman in the underground cult film Remember a Day.

=== Television appearances ===
Sometimes credited as G. B. Money or G. B., he has appeared in a number of other small roles in British television programmes including Rutland Weekend Television (season 1, episode 4) with John Halsey as The Fabulous Bingo Brothers, Bergerac, The Professionals, Shoestring, Big Deal, The Bill, London's Burning, The Piglet Files and EastEnders. In 1989 he played a new age traveller in the ITV drama Forever Green. In 1992 and 1993 he appeared in the BBC sitcom Get Back as a dim but well meaning family friend 'Bungalow Bill' alongside Ray Winstone, Larry Lamb and Kate Winslet.

== Solo discography ==
- Transition. Columbia (1968)
- Welcome to My Head. Capitol (1969),
- Zoot Money. Polydor (1970)
- Mr. Money. MPL (1980)
- Were You There Live. Indigo (1999)
- Full Clothed & Naked. Indigo (2000)
- As & Bs Scrapbook. Repertoire (2003)
- A Big Time Operator. Castle (2005)
- Full Circle. Universal distribution (2007)
- The Book Of Life... I've Read It. Treasure Island (2016)

== Discography as a sideman ==
Albums

Alan Price

- I Put a Spell on You and Other Great Hits. CMC International/Sanctuary (2003)

Alan Price and The Electric Blues Company

- A Gigster's Life for Me. Indigo (1996)

Alexis Korner

- Accidentally Born in New Orleans (1973)
- Alexis Korner (1973)
- Mr. Blues. Toadstool (1974)
- White & Blue Alexis Korner (1980)
- The Party Album. Intercord (1980)
- Alexis Korner and Friends. Amiga (1982)
- Alexis Korner 1972–1983 (1992)
- Alexis Korner Memorial Concert Vol2 (1995)
- Musically Rich...And Famous: Anthology 1967–1982. Castle (1998)

Alvin Lee

- Let It Rock. Repertoire (1978)
- The Anthology (2002)

Andy Roberts

- Urban Cowboy (1971)
- Andy Roberts & the Great Stampede. Elektra (1973)
- Nina and the Dream Tree.Pegasus/Philips (1971)

The Animals

- Ark. CBS (1983)
- Greatest Hits Live!. IRS (2007)

Brian Friel

- Arrivederci Ardrossan (1975)
- Ashes & Matchsticks (1976)

The British Blues Quintet

- Live in Glasgow. Angel Air (2007)

Centipede

- Septober Energy. RCA (1971)

Dantalian's Chariot

- Chariot Rising. Wooden Hill (1996)

Eddie Harris

- E.H. in the U.K. Atlantic (1973)
- Sold out (1974)
- Collectables Classics [Box Set] Eddie Harris (2006)
- Only the Best of Eddie Harris Vol1 (2009)

Ellis

- Riding on the Crest of a Slump. Epic (1972)
- Why not?. Epic (1973)

Eric Burdon

- Survivor . Polydor (1978)
- Good Times: A Collection Eric Burdon (1993)

Eric Burdon and the Animals

- The Twain Shall Meet. MGM (1968)
- Love Is. MGM (1968)
- Every One Of Us. MGM (1968)
- The Best of Eric Burdon & the Animals 1966–1968. Polydor (1991)

Marc Ellington

- Restoration. Philips (1972)

Grimms

- Rocking Duck. Island (1973)
- Grimms. Island (1973)
- Sleepers. DJM (1976)

Johnny Almond Music Machine

- Patent Pending. Deram (1969)

Jim Diamond

- Double Crossed. Cherry Pop (2009)

Georgie Fame

- Charlestons. Three Line Whip (2007)
- The Birthday Big Band (1998 55th-birthday concert). Three Line Whip (2007)

Kevin Ayers

- Yes We Have No Mañanas, So Get Your Mañanas Today. EMI (1976)
- Too Old to Die Young: BBC Live 1972–1976. Hux (1998)
- The BBC Sessions 1970–1976. Hux (2005)

Kevin Coyne

- In Living Black & White. Virgin (1976)
- Heart Burn. Virgin (1976)
- Dynamite Daze. Virgin (1978)
- Babble. Virgin (1979)
- On air Tradition & Moderne (2008)
- I Want My Crown: The Anthology 1973–1980. EMI (2010)
- Live At Rockpalast 1979. 2CDs + DVD – Mig Music/Indigo (2019; also previous editions without video, by other publishers.)

Humble Pie

- Back on Track. Sanctuary (2002)

Juicy Lucy

- Pieces. Polydor (1972)

LaTour

- Home on the Range. Smash (1993 )

Long John Baldry

- Good To Be Alive. Casablanca (1973)

Lonnie Donegan

- Putting on the Style (1977)

Mike McGear

- Woman. Island (1972)

Peter Green.

- The End of the Game. Warner Bros. (1970)
- The Anthology (2008)

Pete York

- Pete York & Friends. Inakustik (2007)

Roger McGough

- A Summer with Monika. Island (1979)

Ruby Turner

- Call Me by My Name. Indigo (1998)

The Scaffold

- Fresh Liver. Island (1973)

Spencer Davis

- Extremely Live at Birmingham Town Hall. Inakustik/Inak Records (1995)

Thunderclap Newman

- Pick N Tell (2006)

Widowmaker

- Widowmaker. United Artists (1976)
- Straight Faced Fighters. Sanctuary (2002)

== Singles discography ==
- The Uncle Willie. Decca (1964)
- I Really Learnt How To Cry. Columbia (1967)
- No One But You. Polydor. (1970)
- Your Feets Too Big. Magic Moon Records (1980)

== Other discography ==
Inclusion on Various Artist compilations

- Rattlesnake Guitar: The Music of Peter Green. Viceroy (1996)
- The Blues Scene. Decca (1996)
- Mod Scene Vol2. Polygram (1996)
- Peter Green Songbook. Seagull (2000)
- Confessin' the Blues. Indigo (1997)
- Fresh Blues Vol2. In-Akustik (1998)
- The R&B Scene. Deram (1998)
- Indigo All-Star Swing & Dance Party. Indigo (1999)
- Indigo Blues Collection Vol6. Indigo (2001)
- Story of Transatlantic Records. Metro Doubles (2003)
- Instro Hipsters a Go-Go Vol2. Psychic Circle (2003)
- Hammond Heroes: 60s R&B Organ Grooves. Ace (2005)
- This Is Mod. Castle (2006)
- Goodbye Nashville, Hello Camden Town: A Pub Rock Anthology. Castle (2007)
- The In Crowd: Original Mod Classics. Castle Pulse (2007)
- This Is the Blues Vol2. Eagle (2010)
- Electric Psychedelic Sitar Headswirlers Vol11. Particles (2012)
