= Quasimodo (music venue) =

Music venue in Berlin

Coordinates: 52°30′21.40″N 13°19′44.62″E

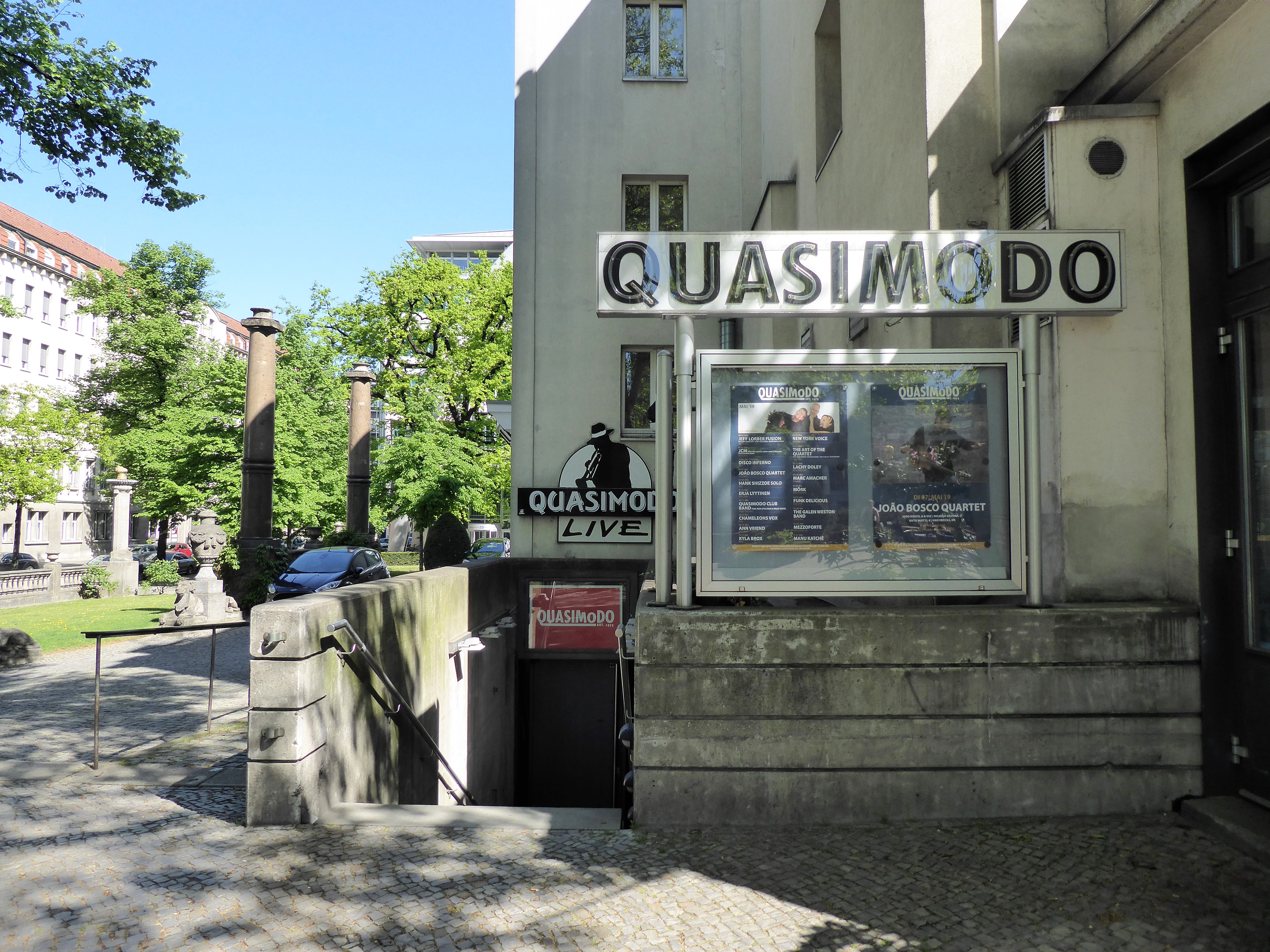
Entrance to Quasimodo (2019)

Quasimodo is a music venue in the Charlottenburg district of Berlin. It is located on the corner of Kantstraße and Fasanenstraße in the basement of the building of the Delphi Filmpalast, a former dance hall and movie theater which is also home to the Quasimodo Café and the Vaganten Bühne theatre. The club offers accommodation for up to 350 seated guests. Rock, Latin music and world music are also presented in concerts along with its more traditional emphasis on modern jazz, blues, soul and funk. Its programme features renowned international artists as well as musicians from the local Berlin and national scene.

== History ==
=== From the beginning to the 1970s ===
The restaurant is located in the Kantstrasse 12a, corner Fasanenstrasse, in the basement of the Delphi , which was built 1927-1928 by Bernhard Sehring as a dance hall. During the late 1920s and early 1930s the Delphi Palace was often an overcrowded "Mecca of Swing", which was closed in 1943 due to heavy damage sustained from allied bombing during World War II. From 1947 to 1949 a first tentative reconstruction of the building took place in which a theater with 1000 seats and a big screen was constructed and became the Delphi Movie Theatre at the Zoo. Under temporary conditions the concerts took place again in the bar in the basement in the Delphi Keller. In 1948 cornet player Rex Stewart recorded for Amiga records with the Hot Club Berlin .

"Quartier Quasimodo " probably opened in 1967 in the basement of the Delphi . By the central Kurfürstendamm location close to the city centre of West Berlin in the neighborhood among others that were also built by Sehring Theater des Westens, universities (Technische Universität Berlin, The University of Arts) and the pub and restaurant landscape around Savignyplatz (Savigny Square) - it was the meeting point for students, Berlin tourists, cinema and theater-goers and night owls of all kinds. It contributed to the reputation of the city, Berlin is "open all" (thanks to the lack of curfew) .

Originally the restaurant drew attention to itself by a varied programme not limited to live music, but then transformed to a " student pub with cabaret "one of the most respected jazz venues in the city. Already in November 1968 organized by free jazz musicians as "established" in the "quasi" counter-events or "commercial" criticized Berlin Jazz Festival and thus laid the foundation stone for the Total Music Meeting (later mainly in the larger venue, Quartier Latin, in the Potsdammerstrasse). Also around at that time, for example, were Peter Brötzmann, Han Bennink, Gunter Hampel, John McLaughlin and Pharoah Sanders. The narrow, low, and smoky basement restaurant also became a meeting place for musicians as for concerts and spontaneous Jam sessions.

=== After 1975 ===
In 1975, Giorgio Carioti, a business administration student from Genoa took over the business and shortened the name to Quasimodo . Under his concert promotions international musicians such as Dizzy Gillespie, Chet Baker, Art Blakey, Chaka Khan and Pat Metheny were featured in the programme.

Carioti changed relatively little in the appearance of Quasimodo, but enlarged the stage and invested heavily in the stage and recording technology. In spite of the inadequate conditions (including rambling premises, often large and tightly packed audience) Quasimodo is known for a high acoustic quality of live concerts. Although large and more appropriate venues exist in Berlin, jazz concerts in Quasimodo are often broadcast within the framework of the Berlin Jazz Festival and Germany Kultur.

The concerts usually begin at 10pm (22:00) on weeknights. Since the late 1990s, the share of jazz in the programme has been criticised as being continuously reduced; over the entire period of its existence however, the Quasimodo programme demonstrates an eclectic mix of different genres, which - taking into account the commercial requirements of an event premises - the public taste sake is changed only gradually.

In early 2017, the venue was taken over by Channel Music and Fee Schlennstedt became club manager and head of programming.

In 2019, the Quasimodo was awarded Category 1 "Venue of the Year" by Minister of State for Culture Monika Grütters as part of the "Applaus" venue program prize. In spring 2023, Hendrik Sievert took over the management of the Quasimodo Club and the Quasimodo Bar.

== Notable performers ==
Among international artists who have played at Quasimodo are Aki Takase, Allan Holdsworth, Alphonse Mouzon, Bill Pierce, Billy Cobham, Chad Wackerman, Chaka Khan, Chris Minh Doky, Dave Weckl, David Murray, David Sanborn, Didier Lockwood, Dizzy Gillespie, Ernie Watts, Frank McComb, Gerry Brown, Hansford Rowe, Hellmut Hattler, Herman Brood & his Wild Romance, Jan Akkerman, Joe Bonamassa, Joe Zawinul, John McLaughlin, Lene Lovich, Lenny White, Mani Neumeier, Mani Neumeier, Michael Landau, Michal Urbaniak Mulgrew Miller, Nigel Kennedy, Nippy Noya, Pat Mastelotto, Pat Metheny, Pierre Moerlen, Poogie Bell, Randy Brecker, Robben Ford, Scott Kinsey, Stanley Clarke, Terry Bozzio, Tom Kennedy, Torsten de Winkel, Tony Levin, and many more. An impromptu one-hour-long appearance by Prince in 1987 following a concert at the Deutschlandhalle concert hall received particular media attention.
