= Colin Hodgkinson =

British rock, jazz and blues bassist (born 1945)

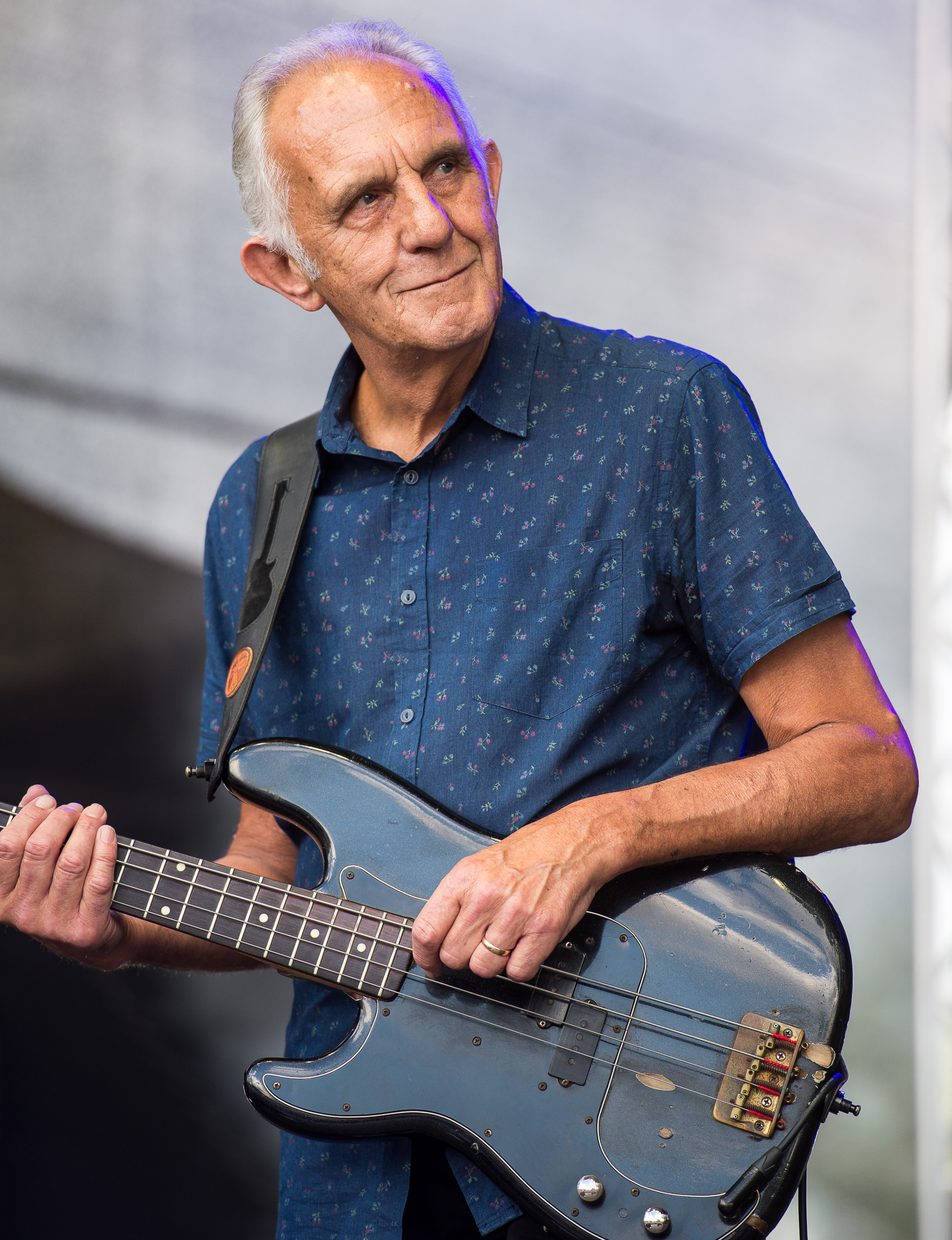
- Hodgkinson with Ten Years After in 2015

Background information
- Born: 14 October 1945 (age 80); Peterborough, Cambridgeshire, England
- Genres: Jazz, post bop, blues, blues rock
- Occupation: Musician
- Instruments: Bass, vocals
- Years active: 1966–present
- Website: colinhodgkinson.co.uk

Colin Hodgkinson (born 14 October 1945) is a British bass guitarist and singer who has worked in rock, jazz and blues. He has been active since the 1960s, with a forceful playing style using bass guitar as a lead instrument rather than its traditional supporting role.

== Career ==
Hodgkinson played in several bands, but was even more prolific as a session and studio musician.

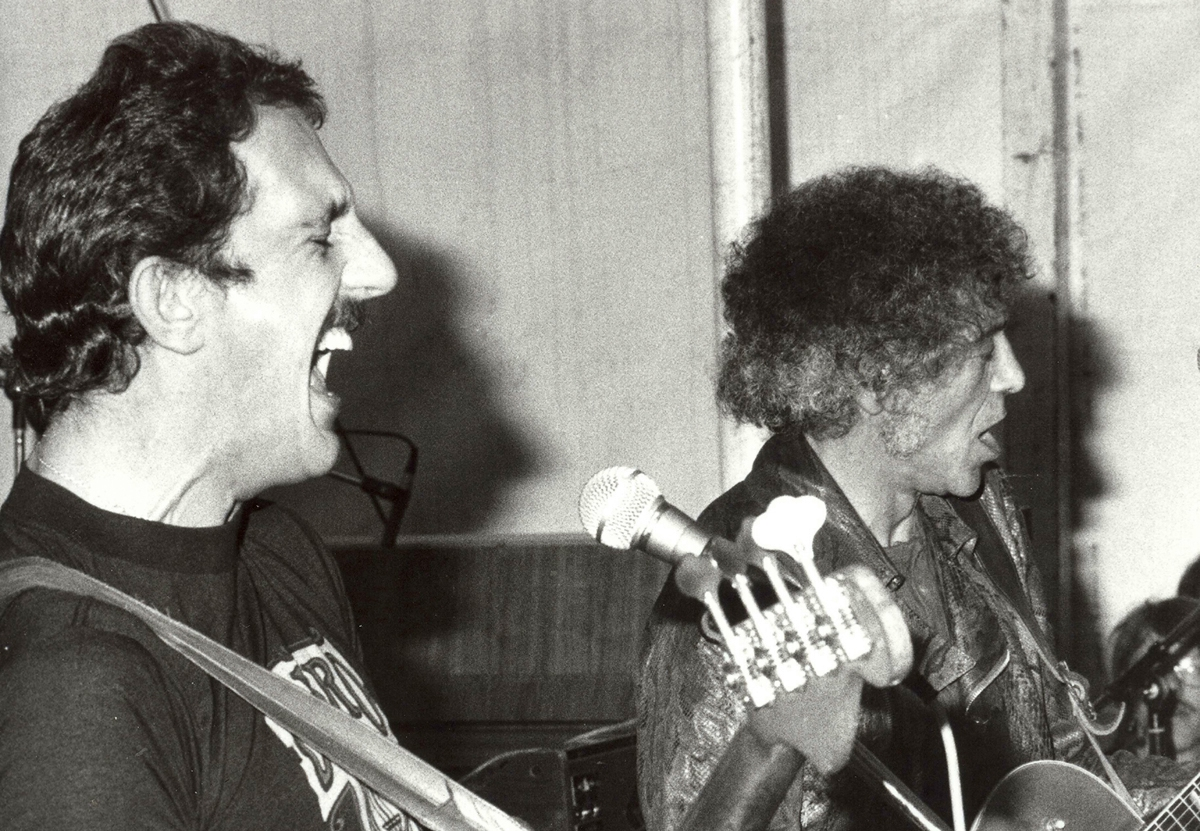
Hodgkinson playing with Alexis Korner, (right) in 1980

He has worked with Chris Rea, The Eric Delaney Band, Back Door (of which he was co-founder), Alexis Korner, Whitesnake, Jon Lord, Jan Hammer, Paul Butterfield, The Spencer Davis Group, Pete York, and The Electric Blues Duo, as well as with Ian "Stu" Stewart's boogie-woogie band, Rocket 88. In 2007, Hodgkinson became a member of The British Blues Quintet, (along with Zoot Money, Maggie Bell, Miller Anderson and Colin Allen).

== Guitar, bass, and sound ==
Hodgkinson is a musician who has developed a left-hander bass technique which can replace both lead and rhythm guitar if necessary, (as exemplified by his work with the jazz-rock trio Back Door - line-up: saxophone, bass, drums). A typical gig involving Hodgkinson will be a solo slot in which he will render a bass and vocals only rendition of a classic blues song, a particular favourite being his take on Jesse Fuller's "San Francisco Bay Blues." This track was included in his solo album The Bottom Line, issued in 1998, which consists mostly of bass solos.

On 28 October 2008, the Colin Hodgkinson Band released Back Door Too!, recorded with Rod Mason (saxophone) and Paul Robinson (drums).

In March 2014, Hodgkinson was announced as the new bass player for Ten Years After, following the departure of Leo Lyons two months prior. In September 2024, it was announced that the Ten Years After line-up of Ric Lee, Chick Churchill, Marcus Bonfanti, and Hodgkinson had split but that Lee intended to premiere a new line-up in early 2025.

== Solo discography ==
- The Bottom Line - 1998 - In Akustik
- Back Door Too! - 2008 (Rokoko Records)

== Selected discography ==
- New Church - Both Sides (1969)
- Alexis Korner - Alexis Korner (1971)
- Alexis Korner - "And..." (1972)
- Back Door - Back Door (1972)
- Back Door - 8th Street Nites (1973)
- Alexis Korner - Mr. Blues (1974)
- Back Door - Another Fine Mess (1975)
- Alexis Korner - Get Off My Cloud (1975)
- Back Door - Activate (1976)
- Jamie Stone - Let It Shine (1977)
- Alexis Korner - Just Easy (1978)
- Hammer - Hammer (also as Black Sheep) (1979)
- Alexis Korner- The Party Album (1979)
- K2 - Why (1980)
- Alexis Korner - Testament (2000) LP/CD - live Paris in March 1980
- Alexis Korner - Live in Paris (1994) CD - live Paris in March 1980 - different songs from 'Testament'
- Butterflies - Butterflies (1981)
- Ronnie Jack - Going for the Big One (1981)
- Cozy Powell - Octopuss (1983)
- Schon & Hammer - Untold Passion (1981)
- Schon & Hammer - Here To Stay (1981)
- Whitesnake - Slide It In (1984) (Original UK mix only)
- Alexis Korner - Juvenile Delinquent (1984)
- Mick Jagger - She's The Boss (1985)
- Pete York - Steaming (1985)
- Phil Carmen - City Walls (1986)
- James Young with Jan Hammer - City Slicker (1986)
- Electric Blues Duo - Bitch (1986)
- Konstantin Wecker - Wieder Dahoam (1986)
- Electric Blues Duo - Maker Mine A Double (1987)
- Konstantin Wecker - Live (1987)
- Spencer Davis Group - Extremely Live (1987)
- Konstantin Wecker - Ganz Schön Wecker (1988)
- James Young - Out on a Day Pass (1988)
- Pete York - Superdrumming 1, 2 & 3 (1988)
- Peter Maffay - Leipzig (1990)
- Peter Maffay - 38317 (1991)
- Peter Maffay - Liebe (1991)
- Peter Maffay - Freunde + Propheten (1992)
- Electric Blues Duo & HR Big Band - Electric Blues Duo & HR Big Band (1993)
- Peter Maffay - Tabaluga und Lilli 1 (1993)
- Peter Maffay - Tabaluga und Lilli 2 (1993)
- Alexis Korner - Memorial Concert Volume 2 (1995)
- Electric Blues Duo - Out on the Highway (1995)
- Miller Anderson - Celtic Moon (1998)
- Spencer Davis Group - Payin' Them Blues Dues (1997)
- Woodstock Taylor - Road Movie (1997)
- Electric Blues Duo - Lucky at Cards (1998)
- Jon Lord - Pictured Within (1999)
- Frank Diez - Stranded on Fantasy Island (2000)
- Back Door - Askin' the Way (2003)
- Spencer Davis Group - Official Bootleg 2006 (2006)
- Electric Blues Duo - The last fair Deal (2006)
- The British Blues Quintet - Live in Glasgow (2007)
- Pete York Percussion Band - Pete York & Friends (2008)
- Electric Blues Duo - LIVE! L’Inoui Luxembourg (2010)
- Ten Years After - A Sting in the Tale (2017)

== See also ==
- The Rough Guide To Jazz
- The NME Book of Rock (1976)
