= Lion Inn =

Public house in North Yorkshire, England

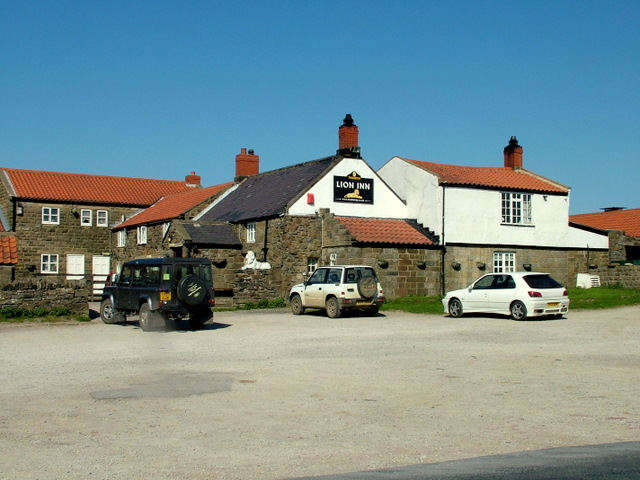
- The pub in 2006
- Interactive map of the Lion Inn area
- Former names: Black Lion Inn; Blakey House

General information
- Type: Public house
- Location: Blakey Ridge, Kirkbymoorside, North Yorkshire, England
- Coordinates: 54.388°N 0.956°W
- Elevation: 1,325 ft (404 m)
- Completed: c. 1553–1558; 468 years ago

Website
- lionblakey.co.uk

The Lion Inn is a public house at Blakey Ridge near Kirkbymoorside, a market town in North Yorkshire, England. The building was completed between 1553 and 1558 (dates vary), and has been used as an inn for four centuries, sitting adjacent to a road across the moors between Castleton and Hutton-le-Hole. During the ironstone industry boom in Rosedale, it catered mainly for those engaged in the mining industry. The inn is known for being subjected to extremes of weather, like Tan Hill Inn, also in North Yorkshire.

At 1,325 feet (404 m) above sea level, it is often referred to as the fourth highest pub in England, and the second highest in Yorkshire (after Tan Hill).

== History ==
The Lion Inn is at 1,325 feet (404 m) above sea level on Blakey Ridge (Blakey means Black), on the road between Castleton and Hutton-le-Hole. The pub is known for being the fourth highest in England, and the second highest in Yorkshire, after the Tan Hill Inn, which like the Lion, used to serve miners. The pub lies on the watershed between several valleys (Eskdale, Farndale, Rosedale, Westerdale), and was located at the site of what is believed to be an ancient hostelry. It is believed that monks built the pub between 1553 and 1558, using it as a rest stop when carrying coffins over the moors.

In the 18th century, the inn was known for the cockfighting on the moors behind the pub, and for being a trading point in corn and fish. Surplus corn from Danby, Commondale and the Fryups was sold to the horse-breeders and stable owners of Ryedale. Later, many of those who were patrons at the pub worked in the coal-mining industry, with many pits still visible on Blakey Moor. Then in the 1850s, the ironstone mining industry and its associated railway brought an enhanced trade to the pub. In the 19th century, the pub was called The Black Lion Inn, or Blakey House.

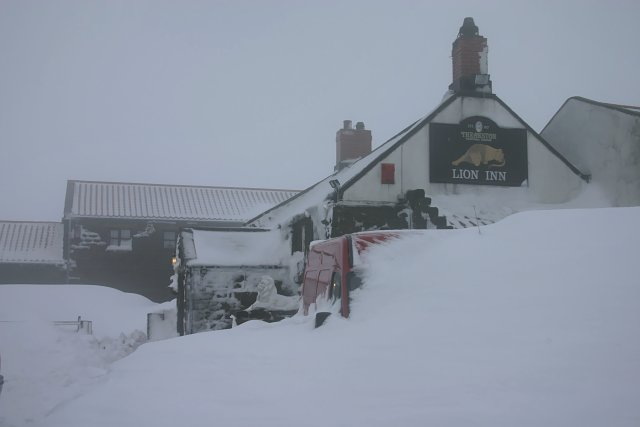
The Lion Inn with snowdrifts in 2005

In December 2010, two customers and five staff were trapped in the pub for eight days during a period of heavy snowfall. Drifts of snow 20 ft (6.1 m) deep, were layered against the pub.

== Popular culture ==
In the 1970s and 1980s, the pub hosted various musical acts such as Chris Rea, Slade, Sandie Shaw, Gene Pitney, Neil Sedaka, Helen Shapiro and Sting.

The jazz trio Back Door, formed and played a residency at the pub in the 1970s, with the landlord at the time (Brian Jones), even financing one of their albums. They returned to the pub in 2006 for a sell-out two nights reunion concert. The rock band Mostly Autumn have also used the Lion Inn as a residency, inserting a small proviso in a 2001 recording contract that allowed them to play live there.

In 2019, segments of the BBC series Top Gear were filmed on the moors using the pub as a base.

== Recreation ==
The Lion Inn is a waypoint on the Coast to Coast and the Lyke Wake Walk. The pub is also often used as a starting/finishing point for walkers on short ventures out on the moors.

The road past the pub was used in 2016 for the stage three event of the Tour de Yorkshire, known as Cote de Blakey Ridge.
