= Colin Allen =

English blues drummer (born 1938)

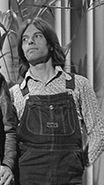
- Allen with Focus in 1974

Background information
- Born: 9 May 1938 (age 88); Bournemouth, Dorset, England
- Genre: Blues
- Occupations: Musician, songwriter
- Instruments: Drums, percussion
- Years active: 1958–2012

Colin Eric Allen (born 9 May 1938) is an English blues drummer and songwriter.

== Career ==
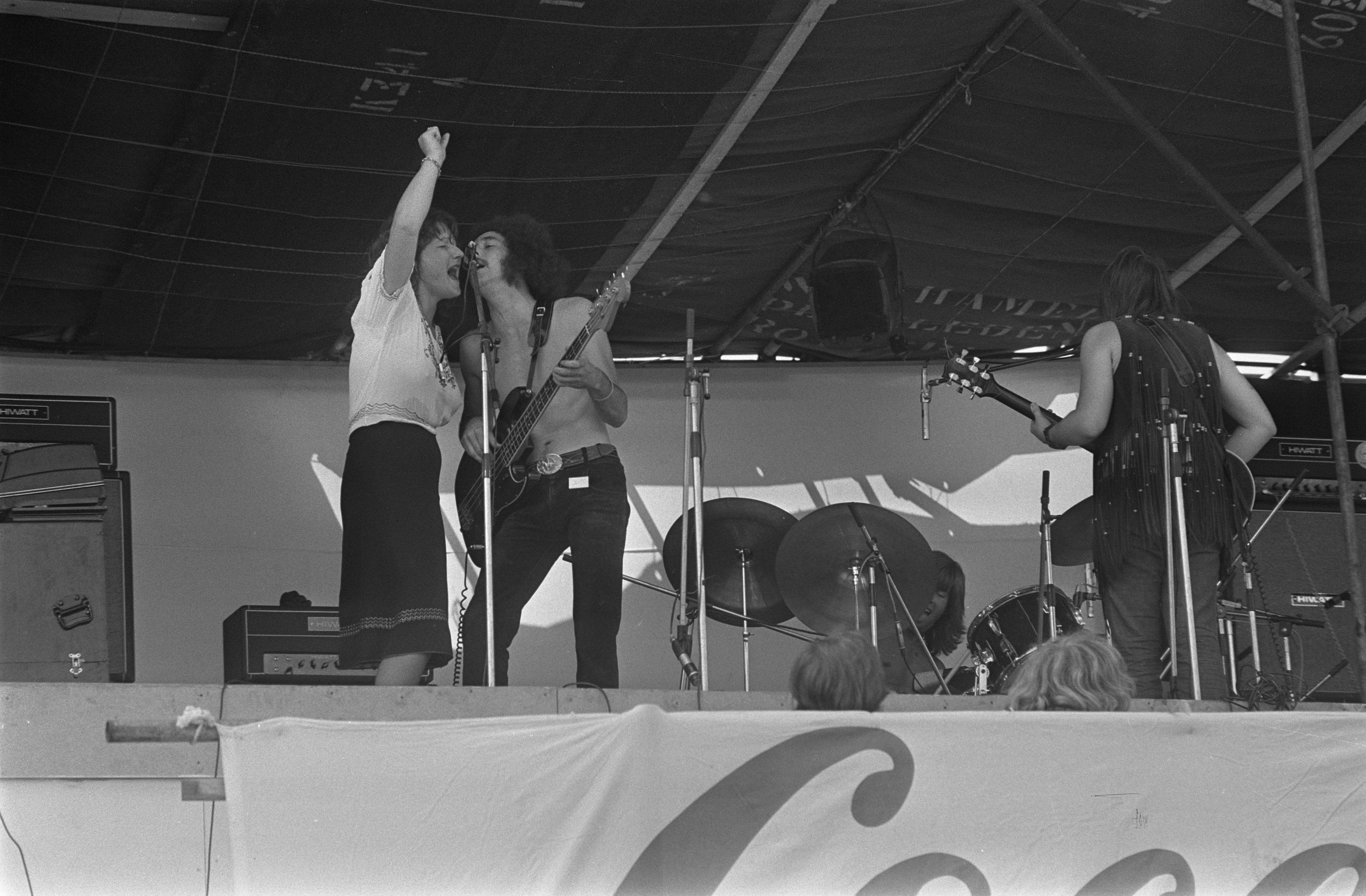
Stone the Crows, Kralingen Music Festival 1970

Allen spent the first ten years of his adult life working in aircraft engineering. He became interested in jazz at the age of 16 and two years later started playing drums. He studied drumming with local drummer Jack Horwood for two years and for a short period with Philly Joe Jones.

Allen's first stage performance was in a skiffle contest at a cinema. He went on to play with jazz musicians in Bournemouth. During 1963 he became a member of Zoot Money's Big Roll Band, which included Andy Summers (later of The Animals and The Police). For a few years he played occasionally at The Bull's Head, Barnes with the Big Roll Band when visiting London. Allen moved to London on 1 January 1964 with Andy Summers.

Allen has worked with Bob Dylan, John Lee Hooker, Sonny Boy Williamson, Memphis Slim, Solomon Burke, John Mayall & the Bluesbreakers, Mick Taylor, Focus, Donovan, Stone The Crows, Georgie Fame, Brian Joseph Friel, and The British Blues Quintet with keyboardist Zoot Money, bassist Colin Hodgkinson, and vocalist Maggie Bell. In 1973 he joined the Dutch band Focus. He played drums on the album Hamburger Concerto (1974).

=== Songwriting ===
Allen started writing lyrics when he was a member of the band, Stone the Crows. He has also co-written songs which have been recorded by artists including Paul McCartney’s Wings (with music by Jimmy McCulloch), Fleetwood Mac, Mick Taylor and Mick Ronson. When co-writing he has mostly worked as a lyricist, as in Taylor's "Alabama", from his solo debut Mick Taylor (1979). To date about sixty songs he co-wrote have been recorded.

== Personal life ==
Allen is married with one daughter. He has lived in Stockholm, Sweden since 1985, where he has played with many Swedish artistes and for several years was a member of one of the best known bands called Totta's Blues Band. He retired from playing in 2012 after a professional career of almost fifty years.
