= List of Strawbs band members =

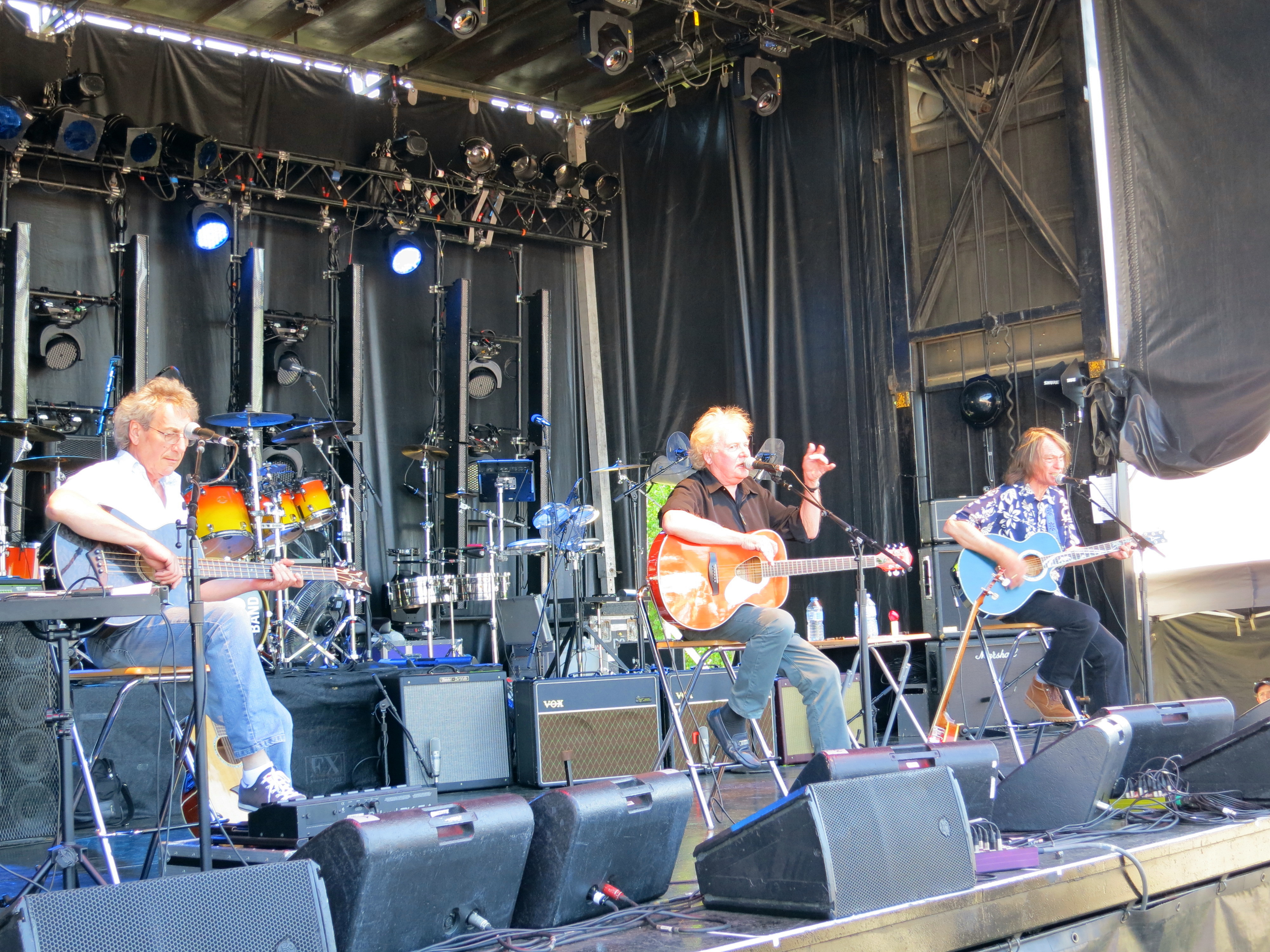
Acoustic Strawbs performing in 2012.

The Strawbs were an English progressive rock band from London. Formed in early 1963 as the Strawberry Hill Boys, the group was originally an acoustic trio consisting of Dave Cousins on vocals, guitar and banjo; Tony Hooper on vocals, guitar and percussion; and Arthur Phillips on mandolin and vocals. The band's final lineup included Cousins (a constant member, save for a brief period in 1980), guitarist and vocalist Dave Lambert (from 1972 to 1978, 1999 to 2001, and since 2004), bassist and vocalist Chas Cronk (from 1973 to 1980, and since 2004), drummer Tony Fernandez (from 1977 to 1980, 2010 to 2012, and since 2014), and keyboardist and guitarist Dave Bainbridge (since 2015)

== History ==
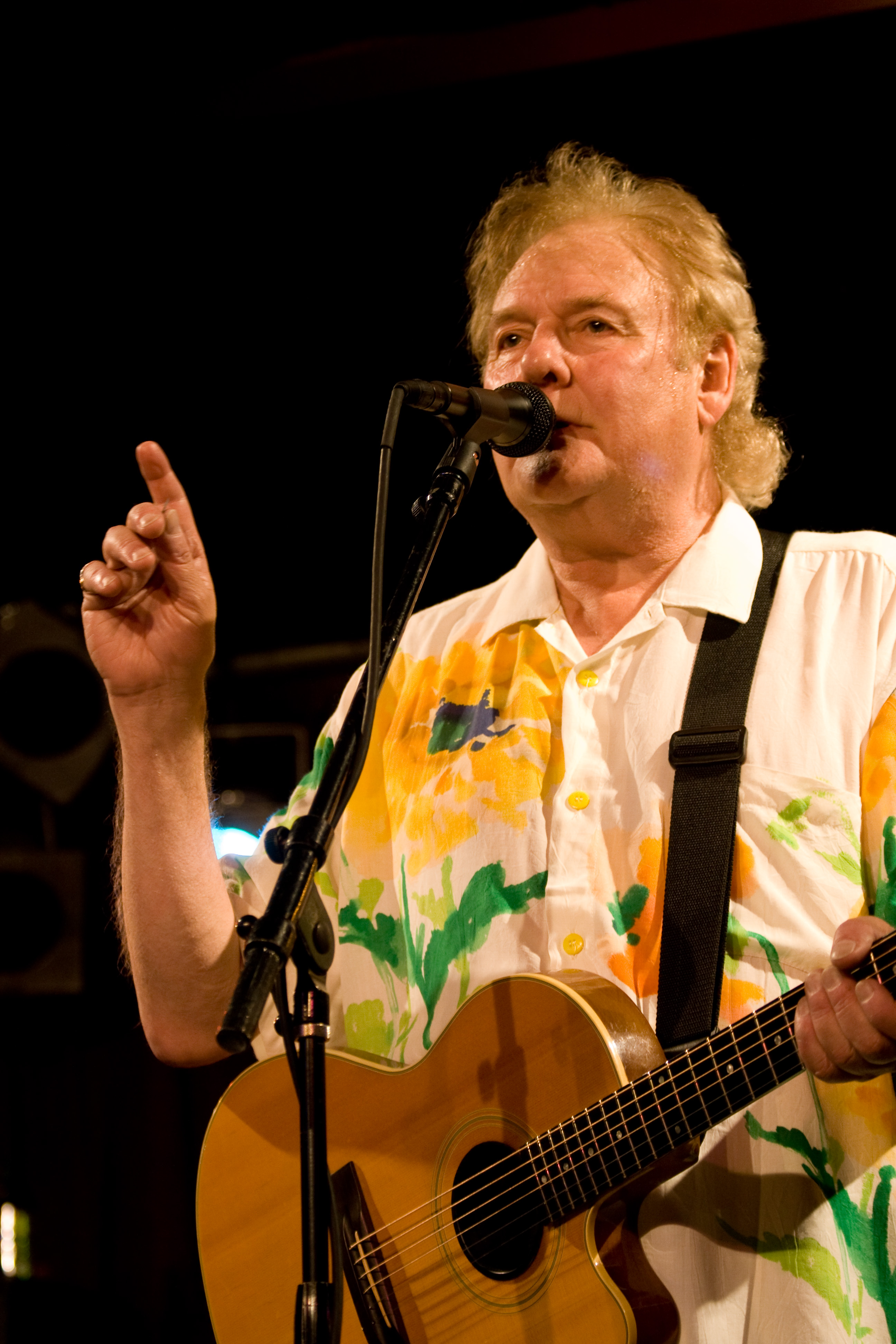
Strawbs have been led by vocalist and guitarist Dave Cousins since their formation in early 1963.

=== 1963–1972 ===
The Strawbs were formed as the Strawberry Hill Boys in early 1963, made up of Dave Cousins on vocals, guitar and banjo; Tony Hooper on guitar, percussion and vocals; and Arthur Phillips on mandolin and vocals. In June 1964, Phillips left and double bassist "Talking" John Berry took over as the band's third member. Berry was replaced by Ron Chesterman in the autumn of 1966. Early the next summer, singer-songwriter Sandy Denny joined the band to make it a four-piece for the first time, with the quartet recording All Our Own Work that July. Denny had left by the end of the year, with Sonja Kristina taking her place for one show before the group reverted to a trio.

Cousins, Hooper and Chesterman released Strawbs' self-titled debut album in May 1969. In August, the group became a quartet again with the addition of Claire Deniz as their first cellist. This lineup recorded Dragonfly, which was issued in February 1970 after Deniz had been replaced by Lindsay L. Cooper. The next month, the group added Rick Wakeman as their first keyboardist. Just a few weeks later, Chesterman left the band and Cooper took over on bass. By the beginning of May, Elmer Gantry's Velvet Opera members John Ford and Richard Hudson had joined the group on bass and drums, respectively, as their style moved away from being primarily acoustic.

After releasing live album Just a Collection of Antiques and Curios and studio album From the Witchwood, Wakeman left Strawbs in August 1971 to join Yes. He was replaced by Derek "Blue" Weaver of Fair Weather. Grave New World followed in early 1972, before founding member Tony Hooper left that August. In a 1991 interview, Hooper credited his departure to musical differences, recalling that "I felt that we were the best at what we did ... But there was pressure to succeed in America, and that entailed a move towards rock. I considered that to move in that direction would be to move into competition with many bands who were very good at what they did".

=== 1972–1980 ===
Tony Hooper was replaced by Dave Lambert, who had just performed on Dave Cousins' solo debut Two Weeks Last Summer. The new lineup released Bursting at the Seams at the beginning of 1973, before the group splintered in the summer when Ford, Weaver and Hudson were all fired after allegedly attempting to oust Cousins. That July, the frontman and Lambert introduced a new lineup with bassist Chas Cronk (formerly a session musician), keyboardist John Hawken (previously of the Nashville Teens) and drummer Rod Coombes (from Juicy Lucy and Stealers Wheel). After releasing Hero and Heroine and Ghosts, Hawken left Strawbs and Nomadness was recorded with various session keyboardists. After the recording of Nomadness, Hawken was replaced by John Mealing and Robert Kirby. The new two-keyboard lineup released Deep Cuts and Burning for You, after which Coombes left the group. He was replaced in time for the recording of Deadlines by Rick Wakeman's drummer Tony Fernandez.

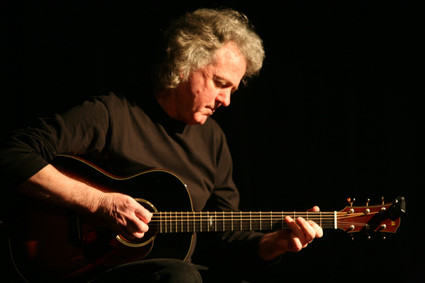
Brian Willoughby took over from Dave Lambert on lead guitar in 1978, and remained after they reformed.

At the end of 1977, Andy Richards replaced Mealing and Kirby. The band began recording Heartbreak Hill in May 1978, but after tracking just one song, Lambert left the band; Jo Partridge of Cockney Rebel was brought in to complete the album. Heartbreak Hill was not released until 1995. By the end of 1978, Lambert's space had been taken by Brian Willoughby. Following the release of the single "The King", frontman Dave Cousins left Strawbs in June 1980 to take a job at Radio Tees, with Roy Hill taking his place in the band. Hill and the remaining members were joined by guitarist John Knightsbridge and saxophonist Bimbo Acock for a pair of gigs, before disbanding.

=== 1983–2003 ===
In July 1983, the Grave New World lineup of the Strawbs (Dave Cousins, Tony Hooper, John Ford, Blue Weaver and Richard Hudson) reformed with lead guitarist Brian Willoughby, debuting at that year's Cambridge Folk Festival. Weaver was replaced by Chris Parren in late 1984, and Ford was replaced by Rod Demick in the summer of 1985. This lineup remained stable for several years, releasing the band's first studio album since reforming, Don't Say Goodbye, in 1987. During late 1992, Don Airey temporarily replaced Parren on tour, as he was working on the Rocky Horror Show production in London. By summer 1993, Weaver had returned to the band.

After several years of only sporadic appearances, in August 1998 the Strawbs performed a 30th anniversary show which was later released as The Complete Strawbs, featuring short sets from various different incarnations of the band, including their current lineup. Early the next year, with returning members John Ford and Dave Lambert, the group returned to regular touring. After tours in 2000 and 2001, the group went on hiatus as Cousins, Lambert and Willoughby focused on their Acoustic Strawbs side project started in late 2000. During this period, various recent and previous members of the band recorded Blue Angel, which was released in April 2003.

=== Since 2004 ===
In the spring of 2004, the 1973–1975 Hero and Heroine lineup of the Strawbs (Dave Cousins, Dave Lambert, Chas Cronk, John Hawken and Rod Coombes) reformed, touring and releasing Déjà Fou. This lineup remained constant for four years, before Hawken announced his retirement from the group in June 2008. In January 2009, former keyboardist Rick Wakeman's eldest son Oliver Wakeman was announced as Hawken's replacement for upcoming shows. Dancing to the Devil's Beat was released later that year. In September 2010, it was announced that Tony Fernandez was returning and John Young was replacing Wakeman for tour dates at the end of the year. In late 2012, Fernandez and Young were replaced by Adam Falkner and Oliver Wakeman's younger brother Adam Wakeman.

By early 2014, Fernandez had returned to his role as drummer for the Strawbs. Wakeman had left by the end of 2015, replaced by Dave Bainbridge. The group has since released three new studio albums: 2017's The Ferryman's Curse, 2021's Settlement, and 2024's The Magic Of It All. The band played their last show at the 2023 Cropredy Festival, Cousins died in July 2025.

== Members ==
Image	Name	Years active	Instruments	Release contributions
	Dave Cousins	1963–1980; 1983–2001; 2004–2023 (died 2025)	vocals; guitar; banjo; dulcimer; autoharp	all Strawbs releases
	Tony Hooper	1963–1972; 1983–1993 (died 2020)	vocals; guitar; percussion	all Strawbs releases from Strawbs (1969) to "Here It Comes" (1972), and from Don't Say Goodbye (1987) to Greatest Hits Live! (1992); All Our Own Work (1973); The Complete Strawbs (2000); Recollection (2006); A Taste of Strawbs (2006); Live at the BBC, Vol. One: In Session and Vol. Two: In Concert (2010); Of a Time (2012)
	Arthur Phillips	1963–1964	mandolin; vocals	none
	"Talking" John Berry	1964–1966 (died)	double bass; vocals	A Taste of Strawbs (2006) – one track
	Ron Chesterman	1966–1970 (died 2007)	double bass	all Strawbs releases from Strawbs (1969) to "Forever" (1970); All Our Own Work (1973); Preserves Uncanned (1990); A Taste of Strawbs (2006); Live at the BBC, Vol. One: In Session (2010); Of a Time (2012)
	Sandy Denny	1967 (died 1978)	vocals; guitar	Strawberry Sampler Number 1 (1969); All Our Own Work (1973); A Taste of Strawbs (2006) – two tracks
	Sonja Kristina	1967	vocals; guitar	40th Anniversary Celebration Vol. 1: Strawberry Fayre (2010) – two tracks
	Claire Deniz	1969	cello	Dragonfly (1970); "Forever" (1970); A Taste of Strawbs (2006) – three tracks; Live at the BBC, Vol. One: In Session (2010) – two tracks
	Lindsay L. Cooper	1970 (died 2001)	cello (January – March); double bass (March – April)	none
	Rick Wakeman	1970–1971	keyboards; synthesisers; piano; harpsichord	all Strawbs releases from Dragonfly (1970) to "Let's Keep the Devil Outside" (1972); Nomadness (1975) – one track; Recollection (2006); A Taste of Strawbs (2006); Live at the BBC, Vol. One: In Session and Vol. Two: In Concert (2010); 40th Anniversary Celebration Vol 1: Strawberry Fayre (2010) – two tracks; Prognostic (2014) – two tracks
	Richard Hudson	1970–1973; 1983–2001	drums; percussion; sitar; acoustic guitar; vocals	all Strawbs releases from Just a Collection of Antiques and Curios (1970) to Bursting at the Seams (1973); Don't Say Goodbye (1987); Ringing Down the Years (1991); Greatest Hits Live! (1992); Strawbs in Concert (1995); The Complete Strawbs (2000); Blue Angel (2003) – two tracks; Recollection (2006); A Taste of Strawbs (2006); Live at the BBC, Vol. One: In Session and Vol. Two: In Concert (2010)
	John Ford	1970–1973; 1983–1985; 1999–2001	bass; guitar; vocals	all Strawbs releases from Just a Collection of Antiques and Curios (1970) to Bursting at the Seams (1973); Strawbs in Concert (1995); The Complete Strawbs (2000); Recollection (2006); A Taste of Strawbs (2006); Lay Down with the Strawbs (2008); Live at the BBC, Vol. One: In Session and Vol. Two: In Concert (2010)
	Derek "Blue" Weaver	1971–1973; 1983–1984; 1993–2001	keyboards; programming	Grave New World (1972); "Here It Comes" (1972); Bursting at the Seams (1974); Strawbs in Concert (1995); The Complete Strawbs (2000); Blue Angel (2003); A Taste of Strawbs (2006); Live at the BBC, Vol. One: In Session and Vol. Two: In Concert (2010); 40th Anniversary Celebration Vol. 1: Strawberry Fayre (2010) – two tracks
	Dave Lambert	1972–1978; 1999–2001; 2004–2023	lead guitar; vocals	all Strawbs releases from Bursting at the Seams (1973) to Deadlines (1978) (except All Our Own Work), and from Heartbreak Hill (1995) onwards (except Recollection and Of a Time)
	Chas Cronk	1973–1980; 2004–2023	bass; acoustic guitar; programming; vocals	all Strawbs releases from Hero and Heroine (1974) to "The King" (1979), and from Heartbreak Hill (1995) onwards (except Recollection, Live at the BBC, Vol. One: In Session and Of a Time)
	Rod Coombes	1973–1977; 2004–2010	drums; percussion; acoustic guitar; vocals	all Strawbs releases from Hero and Heroine (1974) to Burning for You (1977), and from Strawbs in Concert (1995) to 40th Anniversary Celebration Vol. 1: Strawberry Fayre (2010) – three tracks (except Recollection and Live at the BBC, Vol. One: In Session); Prognostic (2014) – one track
	John Hawken	1973–1975; 2004–2008 (died 2024)	keyboards; synthesisers	Hero and Heroine (1974); Ghosts (1975); Strawbs in Concert (1995); Live in Tokyo 75 (2003); Déjà Fou (2004); Live at Nearfest (2005); A Taste of Strawbs (2006); Lay Down with the Strawbs (2008); The Broken Hearted Bride (2008); Live at the BBC, Vol. Two: In Concert (2010); Prognostic (2014) – one track
	John Mealing	1975–1977	keyboards; synthesisers	all Strawbs releases from Nomadness (1975) to Deadlines (1978); A Taste of Strawbs (2006); NY '75 (2007)
	Robert Kirby	1975–1977 (died 2009)	keyboards; woodwind; autoharp; vocals	Deep Cuts (1976); Burning for You (1977); Deadlines (1978); A Taste of Strawbs (2006); NY '75 (2007)
	Tony Fernandez	1977–1980; 2010–2012; 2014–2023	drums; percussion	Deadlines (1978); "The King" (1979); Heartbreak Hill (1995); Blue Angel (2003); A Taste of Strawbs (2006) – four tracks; 40th Anniversary Celebration Vol. 1: Strawberry Fayre (2010); Hero & Heroine in Ascencia (2011); all Strawbs releases from Prognostic (2014) onwards
	Andy Richards	1977–1980	keyboards	"The King" (1979); Heartbreak Hill (1995); Blue Angel (2003) – one track; A Taste of Strawbs (2006) – two tracks; 40th Anniversary Celebration Vol. 1: Strawberry Fayre (2010) – two tracks; Prognostic (2014)
	Brian Willoughby	1978–1980; 1983–2001	lead guitar	"The King" (1979); Don't Say Goodbye (1987); Ringing Down the Years (1991); Greatest Hits Live! (1992); The Complete Strawbs (2000); Blue Angel (2003); A Taste of Strawbs (2006); 40th Anniversary Celebration Vol. 1: Strawberry Fayre (2010) – two tracks
	John Knightsbridge	1980	lead guitar	none
	Bimbo Acock	1980	saxophone; flute	none
	Chris Parren	1984–1992	keyboards	Don't Say Goodbye (1987); Ringing Down the Years (1991); Greatest Hits Live! (1992); A Taste of Strawbs (2006) – one track
	Rod Demick	1985–1999	bass; harmonica; vocals	Don't Say Goodbye (1987); Ringing Down the Years (1991); Greatest Hits Live! (1992); The Complete Strawbs (2000) – three tracks; Blue Angel (2004); A Taste of Strawbs (2006) – two tracks
	Don Airey	1992–1993 (initially as a touring substitute)	keyboards	A Taste of Strawbs (2006) – two tracks
	Oliver Wakeman	2009–2010	keyboards	Dancing to the Devil's Beat (2009); 40th Anniversary Celebration Vol. 1: Strawberry Fayre (2010) – three tracks
	John Young	2010–2012	keyboards; vocals	Hero & Heroine in Ascencia (2011)
	Adam Wakeman	2012–2015	keyboards	The Complete Strawbs (2000)
	Adam Falkner	2012–2014	drums; percussion	none
	Dave Bainbridge	2015–2023	keyboards; programming; guitar; bouzouki	all Strawbs releases from Live in Gettysburg (2017) onwards

== Lineups ==
Period	Members	Releases
Early 1963 – June 1964 (as the Strawberry Hill Boys)	Dave Cousins – vocals, guitar, banjo; Tony Hooper – vocals, guitar, percussion; Arthur Phillips – mandolin, vocals	none
June 1964 – autumn 1966 (as the Strawberry Hill Boys)	Dave Cousins – vocals, guitar, banjo; Tony Hooper – vocals, guitar, percussion; John Berry – double bass, vocals	A Taste of Strawbs (2006) – 1 track
Autumn 1966 – May 1967 (as the Strawberry Hill Boys)	Dave Cousins – vocals, guitar, banjo; Tony Hooper – vocals, guitar, percussion; Ron Chesterman – double bass	Preserves Uncanned (1990); A Taste of Strawbs (2006) – 3 tracks; Of a Time (2012)
May – November 1967	Dave Cousins – vocals, guitar, banjo; Tony Hooper – vocals, guitar, percussion; Sandy Denny – vocals, guitar; Ron Chesterman – double bass	Strawberry Sampler Number 1 (1969); All Our Own Work (1973); A Taste of Strawbs (2006) – 2 tracks
December 1967	Dave Cousins – vocals, guitar, banjo; Tony Hooper – vocals, guitar, percussion; Sonja Kristina – vocals, guitar; Ron Chesterman – double bass	none
December 1967 – August 1969	Dave Cousins – vocals, guitar, banjo; Tony Hooper – vocals, guitar, percussion; Ron Chesterman – double bass	Strawbs (1969); A Taste of Strawbs (2006) – 5 tracks; Live at the BBC, Vol. One (2010) – 3 tracks
August – December 1969	Dave Cousins – vocals, guitar, banjo; Tony Hooper – vocals, guitar, percussion; Ron Chesterman – double bass; Claire Deniz – cello	Dragonfly (1970); "Forever" (1970); A Taste of Strawbs (2006) – 3 tracks; Live at the BBC, Vol. One (2010) – 2 tracks
January – March 1970	Dave Cousins – vocals, guitar, banjo; Tony Hooper – vocals, guitar, percussion; Ron Chesterman – double bass; Lindsay L. Cooper – cello	none
Early – late March 1970	Dave Cousins – vocals, guitar, banjo; Tony Hooper – vocals, guitar, percussion; Ron Chesterman – double bass; Lindsay L. Cooper – cello; Rick Wakeman – keyboards, synthesisers	none
March – April 1970	Dave Cousins – vocals, guitar, banjo; Tony Hooper – vocals, guitar, percussion; Lindsay L. Cooper – double bass; Rick Wakeman – keyboards, synthesisers	none
May 1970 – August 1971	Dave Cousins – vocals, guitar, banjo; Tony Hooper – vocals, guitar, percussion; John Ford – bass, guitar, vocals; Rick Wakeman – keyboards, synthesisers; Richard Hudson – drums, sitar, vocals	Just a Collection of Antiques and Curios (1970); From the Witchwood (1971); "Let's Keep the Devil Outside" (1972); Recollection (2006); A Taste of Strawbs (2006) – 5 tracks; Live at the BBC, Vol. One (2010) – 4 tracks; Live at the BBC, Vol. Two (2010) – 11 tracks
August 1971 – August 1972	Dave Cousins – vocals, guitar, banjo; Tony Hooper – vocals, guitar, percussion; John Ford – bass, guitar, vocals; Blue Weaver – keyboards, programming; Richard Hudson – drums, sitar, vocals	Grave New World (1972); "Here It Comes" (1972); A Taste of Strawbs (2006) – 3 tracks; Live at the BBC, Vol. One (2010) – 7 tracks
September 1972 – May 1973	Dave Cousins – vocals, guitar, banjo; Dave Lambert – lead guitar, vocals; John Ford – bass, guitar, vocals; Blue Weaver – keyboards, programming; Richard Hudson – drums, sitar, vocals	Bursting at the Seams (1973); Strawbs in Concert (1995) – 11 tracks; Live at the BBC, Vol. One (2010) – 3 tracks; Live at the BBC, Vol. Two (2010) – 11 tracks
July 1973 – May 1975	Dave Cousins – vocals, guitar, banjo; Dave Lambert – lead guitar, vocals; Chas Cronk – bass, guitar, vocals; John Hawken – keyboards, synthesisers; Rod Coombes – drums, percussion, vocals	Hero and Heroine (1974); Ghosts (1975); Strawbs in Concert (1995) – 5 tracks; Live in Tokyo 75 (2003); A Taste of Strawbs (2006) – 4 tracks; Live at the BBC, Vol. Two (2010) – 9 tracks
Summer 1975	Dave Cousins – vocals, guitar, banjo; Dave Lambert – lead guitar, vocals; Chas Cronk – bass, guitar, vocals; Rod Coombes – drums, percussion, vocals	Nomadness (1975)
Summer 1975 – summer 1977	Dave Cousins – vocals, guitar, banjo; Dave Lambert – lead guitar, vocals; Chas Cronk – bass, guitar, vocals; Rod Coombes – drums, percussion, vocals; John Mealing – keyboards, synthesisers; Robert Kirby – keyboards, vocals	Deep Cuts (1976); Burning for You (1977); A Taste of Strawbs (2006) – 5 tracks; NY '75 (2007)
Summer – December 1977	Dave Cousins – vocals, guitar, banjo; Dave Lambert – lead guitar, vocals; Chas Cronk – bass, guitar, vocals; Tony Fernandez – drums, percussion; John Mealing – keyboards, synthesisers; Robert Kirby – keyboards, vocals	Deadlines (1978); A Taste of Strawbs (2006) – 2 tracks
December 1977 – May 1978	Dave Cousins – vocals, guitar, banjo; Dave Lambert – lead guitar, vocals; Chas Cronk – bass, guitar, vocals; Andy Richards – keyboards; Tony Fernandez – drums, percussion	Heartbreak Hill (1995) – 1 track
May – December 1978	Dave Cousins – vocals, guitar, banjo; Chas Cronk – bass, guitar, vocals; Andy Richards – keyboards; Tony Fernandez – drums, percussion	Heartbreak Hill (1995) – remaining tracks; A Taste of Strawbs (2006) – 2 tracks
December 1978 – June 1980	Dave Cousins – vocals, guitar, banjo; Brian Willoughby – lead guitar; Chas Cronk – bass, guitar, vocals; Andy Richards – keyboards; Tony Fernandez – drums, percussion	"The King" (1979)
June – July 1980	Roy Hill – lead vocals, guitar; Brian Willoughby – lead guitar; John Knightsbridge – lead guitar; Chas Cronk – bass, guitar, vocals; Andy Richards – keyboards; Bimbo Acock – saxophone, flute; Tony Fernandez – drums, percussion	none
Band inactive July 1980 – July 1983
July 1983 – late 1984	Dave Cousins – vocals, guitar, banjo; Tony Hooper – vocals, guitar, percussion; Brian Willoughby – lead guitar; John Ford – bass, guitar, vocals; Blue Weaver – keyboards, programming; Richard Hudson – drums, sitar, vocals	A Taste of Strawbs (2006) – 4 tracks
Late 1984 – summer 1985	Dave Cousins – vocals, guitar, banjo; Tony Hooper – vocals, guitar, percussion; Brian Willoughby – lead guitar; John Ford – bass, guitar, vocals; Chris Parren – keyboards; Richard Hudson – drums, sitar, vocals	none
Summer 1985 – September 1992	Dave Cousins – vocals, guitar, banjo; Tony Hooper – vocals, guitar, percussion; Brian Willoughby – lead guitar; Rod Demick – bass, harmonica, vocals; Chris Parren – keyboards; Richard Hudson – drums, sitar, vocals	Don't Say Goodbye (1987); Ringing Down the Years (1991); Greatest Hits Live! (1992); A Taste of Strawbs (2006) – 1 track
September 1992 – summer 1993	Dave Cousins – vocals, guitar, banjo; Tony Hooper – vocals, guitar, percussion; Brian Willoughby – lead guitar; Rod Demick – bass, harmonica, vocals; Don Airey – keyboards; Richard Hudson – drums, sitar, vocals	A Taste of Strawbs (2006) – 1 track
Summer 1993 – early 1999	Dave Cousins – vocals, guitar, banjo; Brian Willoughby – lead guitar; Rod Demick – bass, harmonica, vocals; Blue Weaver – keyboards, programming; Richard Hudson – drums, sitar, vocals	The Complete Strawbs (2000) (also features various former lineups of the band)
Early 1999 – June 2001	Dave Cousins – vocals, guitar, banjo; Dave Lambert – lead guitar, vocals; Brian Willoughby – lead guitar; John Ford – bass, guitar, vocals; Blue Weaver – keyboards, programming; Richard Hudson – drums, sitar, vocals	none
Band inactive June 2001 – May 2004 Blue Angel recorded during this period by various former members
May 2004 – June 2008	Dave Cousins – vocals, guitar, banjo; Dave Lambert – lead guitar, vocals; Chas Cronk – bass, guitar, vocals; John Hawken – keyboards, synthesisers; Rod Coombes – drums, percussion, vocals	Déjà Fou (2004); Live at Nearfest (2005); A Taste of Strawbs (2006) – 4 tracks; Lay Down with the Strawbs (2008); The Broken Hearted Bride (2008)
July 2004 (temporary touring lineup)	Dave Cousins – vocals, guitar, banjo; Dave Lambert – lead guitar, vocals; Brian Willoughby – lead guitar; John Ford – bass, guitar, vocals; Blue Weaver – keyboards, programming; Richard Hudson – drums, sitar, vocals	none
Early 2009 – September 2010	Dave Cousins – vocals, guitar, banjo; Dave Lambert – lead guitar, vocals; Chas Cronk – bass, guitar, vocals; Oliver Wakeman – keyboards; Rod Coombes – drums, percussion, vocals	Dancing to the Devil's Beat (2009); 40th Anniversary Celebration Vol. 1: Strawberry Fayre (2010)
September 2010 – late 2012	Dave Cousins – vocals, guitar, banjo; Dave Lambert – lead guitar, vocals; Chas Cronk – bass, guitar, vocals; John Young – keyboards, vocals; Tony Fernandez – drums, percussion	Hero & Heroine in Ascencia (2011)
Late 2012 – early 2014	Dave Cousins – vocals, guitar, banjo; Dave Lambert – lead guitar, vocals; Chas Cronk – bass, guitar, vocals; Adam Wakeman – keyboards; Adam Falkner – drums, percussion	none
Early 2014 – late 2015	Dave Cousins – vocals, guitar, banjo; Dave Lambert – lead guitar, vocals; Chas Cronk – bass, guitar, vocals; Adam Wakeman – keyboards; Tony Fernandez – drums, percussion	none
Late 2015 – August 2023	Dave Cousins – vocals, guitar, banjo; Dave Lambert – lead guitar, vocals; Chas Cronk – bass, guitar, vocals; Dave Bainbridge – keyboards, guitar; Tony Fernandez – drums, percussion	Live in Gettysburg (2017); The Ferryman's Curse (2017); Settlement (2021); The Magic Of It All (2023)
