= Halcyon Days (Strawbs album) =

Compilation album by Strawbs
- Released: 1997
- Recorded: 1968 – 1991
- Genre: Progressive rock
- Length: 148:37
- Label: A&M

Strawbs chronology
Strawbs in Concert (1995)	Halcyon Days (1997)	Concert Classics (1999)

Alternative Album Cover
- US release cover

The Very Best of the Strawbs: Halcyon Days is a compilation album by English band Strawbs. Although credited to Strawbs it does contain three Hudson Ford tracks and a Dave Cousins solo track (taken from his album Two Weeks Last Summer). The album was released as a 2-CD set in the UK and US. The US release has a slightly different title (The Very Best of Strawbs: Halcyon Days – The A & M Years) and a different track listing.

== Cover ==
The cover image is of a common kingfisher, a reference to the mythical kingsfisher of Halcyon days.

== Track listing – UK release ==
=== CD one ===
1. "Ghosts" (Dave Cousins) – 8:30
  "Sweet Dreams"
  "Night Light"
  "Guardian Angel"
  "Night Light"
2. "On Growing Older" (Cousins) – 1:56
3. "The Man Who Called Himself Jesus" (Cousins) – 3:50
4. "Stormy Down" (Cousins) – 2:44
5. "I Turned My Face into the Wind" (Cousins) – 2:35
6. "Queen of Dreams" (Cousins) – 5:31
7. "Witchwood" (Cousins) – 3:22
8. "Keep the Devil Outside" (John Ford) – 3:01
9. "The Hangman and the Papist" (Cousins) – 4:11
10. "Benedictus" (Cousins) – 3:38
11. "Golden Salamander" (Cousins) – 4:54
12. "Tokyo Rosie" (Cousins) – 2:49
13. "Hero and Heroine" (Cousins) – 3:22
14. "Pick up the Pieces" (Richard Hudson, Ford) – 2:35 Hudson Ford track
15. "Lay Down" (Cousins) – 4:32
16. "Backside" (Cousins) – 3:50
17. "Out in the Cold" (Cousins) – 3:19
18. "Round and Round" (Cousins) – 4:44
19. "Oh How She Changed" (Cousins, Tony Hooper) – 2:52

In the liner notes, track 16 is referred to as "Ciggy Barlust (Backside)"

=== CD two ===
1. "The Battle" (Cousins) – 6:25
2. "Grace Darling" (Cousins) – 3:54
3. "Blue Angel" (Cousins) – 9:46 Dave Cousins solo track
  "Divided"
  "Half Worlds Apart"
  "At Rest"
4. "Here It Comes" (Cousins) – 2:42
5. "The Shepherd's Song" (Cousins) – 4:33
6. "We'll Meet Again Sometime" (Cousins) – 3:12
7. "Martin Luther King's Dream" [Live] (Cousins) – 2:53
8. "Burn Baby Burn" (Hudson, Ford) – 3:02 Hudson Ford track
9. "Shine on Silver Sun" (Cousins) – 2:46
10. "Why and Wherefore" (Cousins, Dave Lambert, Chas Cronk, John Hawken, Rod Coombes) – 5:31
11. "Floating in the Wind" (Hudson, Ford) – 4:13 Hudson Ford track
12. "Absent Friend" (Cousins) – 4:35
13. "Part of the Union" (Hudson, Ford) – 2:56
14. "Will Ye Go" (Francis McPeake) – 3:54
15. "The River" (Cousins) – 2:23
16. "Down by the Sea" (Cousins) – 6:19
17. "Tell Me What You See in Me" (Cousins) – 6:11

== Track listing – US release ==
=== CD one ===
1. "The Man Who Called Himself Jesus" (Cousins) – 3:50
2. "Where Is This Dream of Your Youth" (Cousins)
3. "The Battle" (Cousins) – 6:25
4. "The Weary Song" (Cousins) – 3:50
5. "I Turned My Face into the Wind" (Cousins) – 2:35
6. "Forever" (Cousins, Hooper) – 3:32
7. "Song of a Sad Little Girl" (Cousins) – 5:28
8. "A Glimpse of Heaven" (Cousins) – 3:50
9. "Witchwood" (Cousins) – 3:22
10. "Sheep" (Cousins) – 4:14
11. "The Shepherd's Song" (Cousins) – 4:33
12. "The Hangman and the Papist" (Cousins) – 4:11
13. "Benedictus" (Cousins) – 3:38
14. "Queen of Dreams" (Cousins) – 5:31
15. "Heavy Disguise" (Ford) – 2:53
16. "New World" (Cousins) – 4:11
17. "Two Weeks Last Summer" (Cousins) – 3:07 Dave Cousins solo track
18. "Blue Angel" (Cousins) – 9:46 Dave Cousins solo track
  "Divided"
  "Half Worlds Apart"
  "At Rest"

=== CD two ===
1. "Here It Comes" (Cousins) – 2:42
2. "Part of the Union" (Hudson, Ford) – 2:56
3. "Tears and Pavan" – 6:35
  "Tears" (Cousins)
  "Pavan" (Cousins, Hudson, Ford)
4. "The River" (Cousins) – 2:23
5. "Down by the Sea" (Cousins) – 6:19
6. "Lay Down" (Cousins) – 4:32
7. "Autumn" – 8:27
  "Heroine's Theme" (Hawken)
  "Deep Summer Sleep" (Cousins)
  "The Winter Long" (Cousins)
8. "Hero and Heroine" (Cousins) – 3:22
9. "Midnight Sun" (Cronk, Cousins) – 3:06
10. "Out in the Cold" (Cousins) – 3:19
11. "Round and Round" (Cousins) – 4:44
12. "Ghosts" (Cousins) – 8:30
  "Sweet Dreams"
  "Night Light"
  "Guardian Angel"
  "Night Light"
13. "Grace Darling" (Cousins) – 3:54
14. "Lemon Pie" (Cousins) – 4:03
15. "To Be Free" (Cousins) – 4:17
16. "Hanging in the Gallery" (Cousins) – 4:32
17. "The Promised Land" (Cronk) – 4:07

== Personnel ==
The songs were performed by several incarnations of Strawbs, plus the Hudson Ford and Dave Cousins session musicians. The following musicians featured: –

- Dave Cousins – vocals, acoustic guitar, dulcimer
- Tony Hooper – vocals, acoustic guitar
- Dave Lambert – vocals, electric guitar
- Miller Anderson – electric guitar (on Dave Cousins solo tracks)
- Micky Keen – guitar (on Hudson Ford tracks)
- Ron Chesterman – double bass
- Claire Deniz – cello
- John Ford – vocals, bass guitar
- Chas Cronk – bass guitar, vocals
- Rod Demick – bass guitar, vocals
- Roger Glover – bass guitar (on Dave Cousins solo tracks)
- Rick Wakeman – keyboards
- Blue Weaver – keyboards
- John Hawken – keyboards
- Andy Richards – keyboards
- Chris Parren – keyboards (on Hudson Ford tracks)
- Richard Hudson – drums, guitar, vocals
- Rod Coombes – drums, vocals
- Tony Fernandez – drums
- Ken Laws – drums (on Hudson Ford tracks)
- Jon Hiseman – drums (on Dave Cousins solo tracks)

== Release history ==
Region	Date	Label	Format	Catalog
United Kingdom	1997	A&M Records	2-CD set	540,662-2
United States	1998	A&M Records	2-CD set	31454 0951-2
