= A Taste of Strawbs =

Box set by Strawbs
- Released: 13 November 2006
- Recorded: 1966 – 2006
- Genre: Folk rock; progressive folk; progressive rock
- Label: Witchwood Records

Strawbs chronology
Recollection (2006)	A Taste of Strawbs (2006)	Lay Down with the Strawbs (2008)

Professional ratings
Review scores
Source	Rating
AllMusic	4.5/5 stars

A Taste of Strawbs is a box-set album by Strawbs. Instead of being a "best of" album, the compilers (Dave Cousins and Dick Greener) have attempted to present alternative versions of some well-known songs plus some previously unreleased material. Included are some very old songs by The Strawberry Hill Boys, with Dave Cousins, Tony Hooper and Ron Chesterman, also are some very interesting songs by Sandy Denny and The Strawbs, and outtakes from different periods of the band's career.

== Track listing ==
=== CD 1 – Eyes Wide Open ===
1. "The Grey Hawk" (traditional) Strawberry Hill Boys live recording
2. "The Cruel Wars (Higher Germanie)" (traditional) Dave Cousins unreleased recording
3. "You Don't Think About Me" Strawberry Hill Boys demo
4. "Not All The Flowers Grow" (Dave Cousins) Dave Cousins demo
5. "You Keep Going Your Way" (Cousins) Strawberry Hill Boys demo
6. "Sail Away to the Sea" (Cousins) Sandy Denny and the Strawbs
7. "Nothing Else Will Do" (Cousins) Sandy Denny and the Strawbs
8. "Oh How She Changed" (Cousins, Tony Hooper) 2005 re-mix
9. "Or Am I Dreaming" (Cousins) 2005 re-mix
10. "All The Little Ladies" (Cousins, Hooper) Alternative mix with spoken word intro and outro
11. "Ah Me, Ah My" (Hooper) Alternate mix
12. "The Man Who Called Himself Jesus" (Cousins) Alternative mix
13. "The Battle" (Cousins) Live
14. "It's Just Love" (Dave Lambert) Unreleased Fire recording
15. "Another Day" (Cousins) Live
16. "Forever" (Cousins, Hooper) Dragonfly outtake
17. "Where am I"/"I'll Show You Where to Sleep" (Cousins) 1970 live track
18. "Canondale" (Richard Hudson) 1971 live track
19. "RMW" (Rick Wakeman) 1971 live track
20. "Sheep" (Cousins) 1971 live version

=== CD 2 – Changing Places ===
1. "Tomorrow" (Cousins, Hooper, Hudson, John Ford, Blue Weaver) 1972 live version
2. "New World" (Cousins) 1972 live version
3. "Here It Comes" (Cousins) 1972 live version
4. "See How They Run" (Cousins, Lambert) Cousins and Lambert 1972 home demo
5. "Going Home" (Cousins) Alternative version with Dave Lambert singing
6. "The Actor" (Cousins) Alternative mix
7. "Part of the Union" (Hudson, Ford) The original version which was to be released by "The Brothers"
8. "The Winter and the Summer" (Lambert) Dave Lambert home demo
9. "Whichever Way the Wind Blows" (Cousins) Previously unreleased version with Dave Cousins on vocals
10. "Shine on Silver Sun" (Cousins) Extended version with Cousins, Lambert and members of Ten Years After
11. "Out in the Cold"/"Round and Round" (Cousins) Dave Cousins acoustic demos
12. "The Writing on the Wall" (Cousins) Dave Cousins acoustic demo of unreleased song
13. "The Four Queens"
14. "Ghosts Theme" (Cousins) church bells – field recording
15. "Lemon Pie" (Cousins) Dave Cousins acoustic demo
16. "Cherie Je T'aime" (Cousins) French version of "Grace Darling"
17. "So Shall Our Love Die" (Cousins) Dave Cousins acoustic demo
18. "Still Small Voice" (Cousins) Dave Cousins acoustic demo
19. "How I Need You Now" (Cousins) Live recording from The Old Grey Whistle Test with John Mealing

=== CD 3 – Inside Out ===
1. "The Merchant Adventurer" (Cousins) Dave Cousins demo of unreleased song
2. "Blue Angel" (Cousins) out-take from Deep Cuts sessions
3. "Goodbye" (Cousins) alternative version from the album Burning for You
4. "Deadly Nightshade" Dave Cousins acoustic demo
5. "Midnight" out-take from first Deadlines sessions
6. "Sweet Voices" out-take from first Deadlines sessions
7. "Bring Out Your Dead" (Cousins, Wakeman) Dave Cousins acoustic demo (aka "The Young Pretender")
8. "Another Day Without You" (Cousins) demo version
9. "Touch the Earth" (Lambert, Chas Cronk) Lambert and Cronk studio recording
10. "Armada" Juan Martin and Strawbs 1981 studio recording
11. "A Glimpse of Heaven" (Cousins) Cousins and Willoughby live at Sidmouth Folk Festival
12. "The Hangman and the Papist" (Cousins) a recording made for Rick Wakeman's Gastank programme
13. "I'll Carry On Beside You" (Cousins) 1983 Cambridge Folk Festival
14. "Heavy Disguise" (Ford) 1984 rehearsal recording
15. "That's When the Crying Starts" (Cousins) 1984 live recording
16. "Evergreen" (Cousins) Dave Cousins home demo
17. "Song of a Sad Little Girl" (Cousins) 1988 Wakeman and Cousins live recording

=== CD 4 – Further Down the Road ===
1. "Ringing Down the Years" (Cousins) 1990 Strawbs live recording
2. "Further Down the Road" (Cousins) Dave Cousins acoustic demo
3. "Heartbreak Hill" (Cousins, Cronk) 1993 silver jubilee tour with Don Airey
4. "Extravaganza on a Theme of Strawbs" (Don Airey) Don Airey solo from 1993 silver jubilee tour
5. "File of Facts" (Cousins, Airey) 1993 Dave Cousins and Don Airey recording
6. "Hero and Heroine" (Cousins) Chiswick House concert recording with guest Ric Sanders
7. "The Ten Commandments" Dave Lambert and Brian Willoughby from 2001 tour
8. "The King" (Cousins) Wakeman and Cousins Hummingbird album outtake
9. "Hummingbird" instrumental outtake from Wakeman and Cousins Hummingbird album
10. "Alice's Song" (Craig, Willoughby) 2003 live Acoustic Strawbs recording
11. "McLean Street"/"Who Knows Where the Time Goes" (Sandy Denny) 2004 live recording
12. "We'll Meet Again Sometime" (Cousins) 2004 Acoustic Strawbs recording
13. "Sunday Morning" (Cousins, Lambert) single mix
14. "On a Night Like This" (Cousins) acoustic version
15. "Dragonfly" (Cousins) live 2005 version
16. "Canada" (Cousins) new Dave Cousins solo song
17. "Here Today, Gone Tomorrow" (Cousins) live 2006 recording

=== CD 5 – Tastebuds (bonus disc) ===
1. "The Happiest Boy in Town" (Cousins) Strawberry Hill Boys demo
2. "Draught Raga" (Hudson, Ford) 1970 live sitar instrumental
3. "Ways and Means" (Cousins) Two Weeks Last Summer outtake
4. "Rip it Off Blues" (Cousins) Dave Cousins demo
5. "Stay Awhile With Me" (Cousins) Dave Cousins version of Strawberry Sampler Number 1 track
6. "Oh So Sleepy" (Cousins) outtake from the Deep Cuts album
7. "Barcarole" (Cousins, Cronk) instrumental outtake from the album Burning for You
8. "Time and Life" (Cousins, Cronk) Dave Cousins home demo
9. "Heartbreaker" (Wil Malone) from the Intergalactic Touring Band album
10. "Andalucian Express" Strawbs with Juan Martin
11. "Lay Down" (Cousins) 1984 live version
12. "Over the Hill" (Blue Weaver) Blue Weaver solo track
13. "You Never Needed Water" (Cousins) originally on the Cousins & Willoughby album The Bridge
14. "If" (Cousins) Acoustic Strawbs
15. "Cold Steel" (Lambert) Folk Scene live recording
16. "The River" (Cousins)/"Down by the Sea" (Cousins) Strawbs live in Thalgau 2006

== Personnel ==
- Dave Cousins – lead vocals, backing vocals, acoustic guitar, dulcimer, banjo

Most of the musicians from the various incarnations of Strawbs over the years play on the various tracks. For a full list see the article on the band.
