= The Collection (Strawbs album) =

Compilation album by Strawbs
- Released: 6 May 2002
- Recorded: 1968 – 1976
- Genre: Folk rock; progressive rock
- Length: 62:27
- Label: Spectrum

Strawbs chronology
Strawberry Sampler Number 1 (2001)	The Collection (2002)	Tears and Pavan (2002)

The Collection is a compilation album by English band Strawbs.

== Track listing ==
1. "Part of the Union" (Richard Hudson, John Ford) – 2:54
2. "I'll Carry on Beside You" (Cousins) – 3:09
3. "The Man Who Called Himself Jesus" (Cousins) – 3:50
4. "Oh How She Changed" (Cousins, Tony Hooper) – 2:52
5. "I Turned My Face into the Wind" (Cousins) – 2:42
6. "Song of a Sad Little Girl" (Cousins) – 5:28
7. "Witchwood" (Cousins) – 3:23
8. "Benedictus" (Cousins) – 4:24
9. "Heavy Disguise" (Ford) – 2:53
10. "Keep the Devil Outside" (Ford) – 3:02
11. "Shine on Silver Sun" (Cousins) – 2:46
12. "Grace Darling" (Cousins) – 3:55
13. "Lemon Pie" (Cousins) – 4:03
14. "Martin Luther King's Dream" (Cousins) – 2:53
15. "Tokyo Rosie" (Cousins) – 2:48
16. "Will Ye Go" (Francis McPeake) – 3:54
17. "I Only Want My Love to Grow in You" (Cousins, Chas Cronk) – 3:00
18. "Lay Down" (Cousins) – 4:31

== Personnel ==
- Dave Cousins – vocals, acoustic guitar, electric guitar, dulcimer, piano (all tracks except 9)
- Tony Hooper – vocals, acoustic guitar (tracks 2–8,10,14)
- Dave Lambert – vocals, electric guitar (tracks 1,11–13,15–18)
- Ron Chesterman – double bass (tracks 3–5)
- John Ford – bass guitar, acoustic guitar, vocals (tracks 1,2,6–10,14,16,18)
- Chas Cronk – bass guitar, vocals (tracks 11–13,15,17)
- Rick Wakeman – keyboards, clavinet (tracks 2,6,7,10,14,15)
- Blue Weaver – keyboards, accordion (tracks 1,8,16,18)
- John Hawken – keyboards (tracks 11–13)
- Robert Kirby – keyboards (track 17)
- John Mealing – keyboards (track 17)
- Richard Hudson – drums, vocals (tracks 1,2,6–8,10,14,16,18)
- Rod Coombes – drums, vocals (tracks 11–13,15,17)

== Release history ==
Region	Date	Label	Format	Catalog
United Kingdom	May 6, 2002	Spectrum	2-CD set	5447062
