= Strawbs by Choice =

Compilation album by Strawbs
- Released: August 1974
- Recorded: 1969–1973
- Genre: Folk rock; progressive folk; progressive rock
- Length: 40:13
- Label: A&M

Strawbs chronology
Hero and Heroine (1974)	Strawbs by Choice (1974)	Ghosts (1975)

Strawbs by Choice is a compilation album by The Strawbs.

== Track listing ==
1. "The Man Who Called Himself Jesus" (Dave Cousins) – 3:51
2. "Another Day" (Cousins) – 3:16
3. "Forever" (Cousins, Tony Hooper) – 3:32
4. "Song of a Sad Little Girl" (Cousins) – 5:28
5. "The Shepherd's Song" (Cousins) – 4:34
6. "Benedictus" (Cousins) – 4:24
7. "Here It Comes" (Cousins) – 2:42
8. "The Actor" (Cousins) – 4:28
9. "Lay Down" (Cousins) – 4:31
10. "Lay a Little Light on Me" (Cousins)/"Hero's Theme" (Dave Lambert) – 3:27

== Personnel ==
- Dave Cousins – lead vocals, guitar (all tracks), dulcimer (2,4,6)
- Tony Hooper - backing vocals, guitar (tracks 1–5–7)
- Ron Chesterman – double bass (tracks 1–3)

== Additional personnel ==
- Miller Anderson - lead guitar
- Dave Lambert – backing vocals, guitar (tracks 8–10)
- Claire Deniz – cello (tracks 2,3)
- John Ford – backing vocals, bass guitar (tracks 4–7,9)
- Roger Glover – bass guitar (track 8)
- Chas Cronk – bass guitar (track 10)
- Rick Wakeman – piano, organ, harpsichord, celeste (tracks 3,4,5)
- Blue Weaver – keyboards (tracks 6,7,9)
- John Hawken – keyboards (track 10)
- Richard Hudson - drums, percussion, sitar, tablas,(tracks 4–7,9)
- Jon Hiseman : drums, percussions (track 8)
- Rod Coombes – drums (track 10)

== Release history ==
Region	Date	Label	Format	Catalog	Comment
United Kingdom	1974	A&M	stereo LP	AMLH 68259	
Germany	1974	A&M	stereo LP	88 249 ET	
New Zealand	1975	A&M	stereo LP	L32598	
