= Recollection (Strawbs album) =

Live album by Strawbs
- Released: 2006
- Recorded: 1970
- Genre: Progressive folk
- Length: 68:07
- Label: Witchwood Media

Strawbs chronology
Painted Sky (2005)	Recollection (2006)	A Taste of Strawbs (2006)

Recollection is a live album by Strawbs published in 2006. The tracks were recorded in 1970 on a tour supporting Roy Harper just prior to the concert at the Queen Elizabeth Hall (the recordings from this concert were released as the album Just a Collection of Antiques and Curios).

This incarnation of the band had only rehearsed together for a couple of weeks. The recording is the first made with Rick Wakeman, John Ford and Richard Hudson in the line-up and features live re-workings of songs from the Strawbs and Dragonfly albums as well as alternative recordings of some of the Antiques and Curios songs.

== Track listing ==
All tracks written by Dave Cousins unless indicated otherwise

1. "We'll Meet Again Sometime" – 4:12
2. "Or Am I Dreaming" – 2:29
3. "Song of a Sad Little Girl" – 5:29
4. "That Which Once was Mine" – 3:33
5. "Fingertips" –6:10
6. "The Man Who Called Himself Jesus" – 4:35
7. "Temperament of Mind" (Rick Wakeman) – 5:28
8. "Josephine, for Better or for Worse" – 3:27
9. "The Antique Suite" – 12:15
  "The Reaper"
  "We Must Cross the River"
  "Antiques and Curios"
  "Hey It's Been a Long Time"
10. "The Battle" – 5:52
11. "Where is This Dream of Your Youth?" – 9:31
12. "Dance On" (Valerie Murtagh, Elaine Murtagh, Ray Adams) – 2:22

== Personnel ==
- Dave Cousins – vocals, guitars, dulcimer, banjo
- Tony Hooper – vocals, acoustic guitar, tambourine
- John Ford – bass guitar, vocals
- Rick Wakeman – piano, organ, harpsichord, celesta
- Richard Hudson – drums, sitar, vocals

== Recording ==
- Recorded live 1970
- Mixed by Roger Wake
- Produced by Dave Cousins

== Cover ==
The photographs used were taken by Van Hallan (1970) from Dave Cousins' own collection and Geraldine Parkinson (2006). Sleeve notes by Dave Cousins.

== Release history ==
Region	Date	Label	Format	Catalog	Comments
United Kingdom	2006	Witchwood Media	compact disc	WMCD 2033	Recorded in 1970
