= On Growing Older =

Song by Strawbs

from the album Grave New World
- Released: February 1972
- Recorded: November 1971
- Genre: Progressive rock
- Length: 1:56
- Label: A&M
- Songwriter: Dave Cousins
- Producer: Strawbs

"On Growing Older" is a song by English band Strawbs written by Dave Cousins. The track first appeared on the Grave New World album, although it was written and recorded a few years earlier. The original recording was later released on the Strawberry Sampler Number 1 album.

== Lyrical and musical content ==
As befits its place on the album, the song describes "a regret for the waste of my youth" of a middle-aged person who nonetheless realises that they still have time to accomplish some of their ambitions. The imagery is pastoral and natural, similar to "Another Day" from the Dragonfly album or perhaps "A Glimpse of Heaven" from From the Witchwood. The instrumentation is simple, and the jangling guitar sounds are evocative of The Byrds, of whom Cousins is a fan.

== Personnel ==
- Dave Cousins – lead vocals, acoustic guitar
- Tony Hooper – backing vocals, 12-string guitar
- John Ford – bass guitar
- Richard Hudson – drums
