= Strawbs in Concert =

Live album by Strawbs
- Released: 13 March 1995
- Recorded: 1973 and 1974
- Genre: Progressive rock
- Label: Windsong

Strawbs chronology
Heartbreak Hill (1995)	Strawbs in Concert (1995)	Halcyon Days (1997)

Strawbs in Concert is a live album by English band Strawbs. The tracks are taken from recordings of two BBC In Concert programmes from 1973 (tracks 1 – 11) and 1974 (tracks 12 – 16).

== Track listing ==
1. "New World" (Dave Cousins)
2. "Sheep" (Cousins)
3. "Tears and Pavan" (Cousins, Richard Hudson, John Ford)
4. "The Hangman and the Papist" (Cousins)
5. "Benedictus" (Cousins)
6. "Heavy Disguise" (Ford)
7. "The River" (Cousins)
8. "Down by the Sea" (Cousins)
9. "The Winter and the Summer" (Dave Lambert)
10. "Part of the Union" (Hudson, Ford)
11. "Lay Down" (Cousins)
12. "Autumn"
  "Heroine's Theme" (John Hawken)
  "Deep Summer Sleep" (Cousins)
  "The Winter Long" (Cousins)
13. "Out in the Cold" (Cousins)
14. "Round and Round" (Cousins)
15. "Hero and Heroine" (Cousins)
16. "Lay a Little Light on Me" (Cousins)

== Personnel ==
- Dave Cousins – vocals, acoustic guitar
- Dave Lambert – vocals, electric guitar
- Richard Hudson – drums, vocals (tracks 1–11)
- John Ford – vocals, bass guitar (tracks 1–11)
- Blue Weaver – keyboards, accordion (tracks 1–11)
- Chas Cronk – bass guitar, vocals (tracks 12–16)
- John Hawken – keyboards (tracks 12–16)
- Rod Coombes – drums, vocals (tracks 12–16)

== Recording ==
Recorded in 1973 and 1974 for the BBC In Concert TV programme.

== Release history ==
Region	Date	Label	Format	Catalog
United Kingdom	1995	Windsong	CD	WIN CD069
