= Preserves Uncanned =

Compilation album by Strawbs
- Released: 1990
- Recorded: 1966 – 1968
- Genre: Folk rock; progressive folk; bluegrass
- Label: Dirty Linen

Strawbs chronology
Don't Say Goodbye (1987)	Preserves Uncanned (1990)	Sandy Denny and the Strawbs (1991)

Preserves Uncanned is a compilation album of songs by Strawbs. Some tracks, however, were not released on studio albums. The recordings themselves are demos dating from the mid to late '60's.

== Track listing ==
=== Side one ===
1. "Coal Creek March" (Dave Cousins)
2. "Sail Away to the Sea" (Cousins)
3. "That Which Once Was Mine" (Cousins)
4. "How Everyone But Sam Was a Hypocrite" (Cousins)
5. "October to May" (Cousins)
6. "On My Way" (Cousins)
7. "All I Need is You" (Cousins)
8. "Josephine, For Better or for Worse" (Cousins)
9. "We'll Meet Again Sometime" (Cousins)

=== Side two ===
1. "Spanish is the Loving Tongue" (traditional)
2. "Handsome Molly" (traditional)
3. "Hard Times" (Cousins)
4. "How I Need You" (Cousins)
5. "The Man Who Called Himself Jesus" (Cousins)
6. "Pieces of 79 and 15" (Cousins, Tony Hooper)
7. "Following the Rainbow" (Cousins)
8. "Always on My Mind" (Hooper)
9. "Martin Luther King's Dream" (Cousins)
10. "Bitter Sunshine" (Cousins)

=== Side three ===
1. "All the Little Ladies" (Cousins, Hooper)
2. "Just the Same in Every Way" (Cousins)
3. "Strawberry Picking" (Cousins)
4. "A Good Woman's Love" (traditional)
5. "The Battle" (Cousins)
6. "Jenny O'Brien" (Cousins)
7. "Sweetling" (Hooper)
8. "Flinthill Special" (traditional)
9. "The Blantyre Explosion" (traditional)
10. "Tell Me What You See in Me" (Cousins)

=== Side four ===
1. "Or Am I Dreaming" (Cousins)
2. "I'll Show You Where to Sleep" (Cousins)
3. "And You Need Me" (Cousins)
4. "You Keep Going Your Way" (Cousins)
5. "Where is This Dream of Your Youth" (Cousins)
6. "Why" (Cousins)
7. "Lawrence Brown" (Cousins)
8. "Wild Strawberries" (Cousins, Hooper)
9. "Song to Alex" (Cousins, Hooper)

== Personnel ==
- Dave Cousins – lead vocals, backing vocals, guitar, banjo
- Tony Hooper - lead vocals, backing vocals, guitar
- Ron Chesterman – double bass

== Release history ==
Region	Date	Label	Format	Catalog
United States	1990	Dirty Linen	2-cassette pack	DL101
United Kingdom	1991	Road Goes on Forever	2-CD set	RGF DCD 003
United Kingdom	1991	Road Goes on Forever	2-cassette pack	RGF DMC 003
