= The Flower and the Young Man =

Song by English band Strawbs

Song by Strawbs

from the album Grave New World
- Released: February 1972
- Recorded: November 1971
- Genre: Progressive rock
- Length: 4:18
- Label: A&M
- Songwriter: Dave Cousins
- Producer: Strawbs

"The Flower and the Young Man" is a song by English band Strawbs written by Dave Cousins. The track first appeared on the Grave New World album.

== Lyrical and musical content ==
The lyrics are a veiled reference to a love affair which Dave Cousins had had but did not want to reveal for risk of upsetting his family. The music features the clavioline, an early predecessor of the synthesizer.

The song starts with an a cappella verse, followed by a verse sung by Tony Hooper. The chorus parts of the song are instrumental, featuring a heavy use of keyboards. The final verse is similar to the a cappella verse but with harmonium backing.

== Personnel ==
- Dave Cousins – backing vocals, acoustic guitar
- Tony Hooper – lead vocals, acoustic guitar
- Blue Weaver – Hammond organ, Mellotron, Clavioline, harmonium
- John Ford – backing vocals, bass guitar
- Richard Hudson – backing vocals, drums
