= Queen of Dreams =

Song by Strawbs

from the album Grave New World
- Released: February 1972
- Recorded: November 1971
- Genre: Progressive folk
- Length: 5:32
- Label: A&M
- Songwriter(s): Dave Cousins
- Producer(s): Strawbs

"Queen of Dreams" is a song performed by English band Strawbs and written by Dave Cousins. The track first appeared on the 1972 Grave New World album.

== Musical content ==
The track has a psychedelic quality, due to the first two verses, where acoustic guitar chords were played in reverse order then tape-reversed to provide instrumental backing. The middle section features a solo on a dulcimer played through a fuzzbox, similar to the solo on another Grave New World Track "Benedictus". There follows a short section of special effects which then leads into a third verse, this time with a backing of conventional acoustic guitars. The song continues with a middle 8 section and an instrumental closing section, leading to a drum solo which fades out.

== Personnel ==
- Dave Cousins – vocals, acoustic guitar, electric dulcimer
- Tony Hooper – backing vocals, acoustic guitar
- Blue Weaver – Hammond organ, Mellotron, piano
- John Ford – bass guitar
- Richard Hudson – drums
