= Dave and the Derros =

Australian band

- Genres: Punk, Comedy
- Years active: 1978-1981
- Label: Mushroom

Dave and the Derros is an Australian comedy band. The act was formed by Radio station 3XY's breakfast announcer David Jones and production manager Nigel Haines. The started out doing parody songs on the radio then in November 1978 released their first single "Death to Disco". A follow-up single "Nice Legs, Shame About The Face" (a cover of The Monks "Nice Legs Shame About Her Face") reached the top 20 on the Australian singles chart. It was later described by Cameron Adams of the Herald Sun as a "Pub rock novelty hit that was really all about the title" when he ranked it as one of the 15 worst Australian songs of all time.

== Discography ==
Singles

- "Death To Disco"/"Punk Princess" (1978, Mushroom) Aus #44
- "Out Of Bounds"/"Hounded" (1979, Mushroom) Aus #98
- "Nice Legs, Shame About The Face"/"Hip Pocket Nerve" (1979, Mushroom) Aus #20
- "Up Your Nose With A Rubber Hose"/"Sure She Is The Girl" (1980, Mushroom) Aus #73
- "Two Cans Of Beer And A Bucket Of Chips"/"I Got The D.T.'s" (1981, Mushroom)

Album

- Live After Death (1980, Mushroom) Aus #83
