= Suspended Animation (The Monks album) =

Studio album by the Monks
- Released: 1981
- Studios: Basing Street No. 1, London, England
- Label: Polydor
- Producers: Richard Hudson, John Ford, Terry Cassidy

The Monks chronology
Bad Habits (1979)	Suspended Animation (1981)

Suspended Animation is an album by the Monks, released in 1981 in Canada on the Polydor label. In Germany it was released on CBS.

This album was the follow-up to the band's debut album, Bad Habits. The songs are composed by Richard Hudson, John Ford, and Terry Cassidy.

The album was reissued in the U.K., on CD for the first time, on August 24, 1999, on the Resurgent label. It was released yet again on January 12, 2009, on Angel Air Records. The re-released versions of the album featured six additional songs, from the band's never-completed third album, Cybernetic Sister.

In 2004, John Ford featured "Suspended Animation" on his solo album Backtracking, released on Whole Shot Records.

== Track listing ==
1. "Don't Want No Reds" - 2:53
2. "Suspended Animation" - 4:43
3. "Don't Bother Me – I'm a Christian" - 3:21
4. "James Bondage" - 3:11
5. "Grown-ups" - 2:47
6. "Cool Way to Live" - 3:07
7. "Oxford Street" - 4:06
8. "Go" - 4:09
9. "I Can Do Anything You Like" - 3:15
10. "Plastic Max" - 4:20
11. "King Dong" - 4:04
12. "Space Fruit" - 3:46

1999/2009 re-release bonus tracks

13. "Gold and Silver"
14. "Cybernetic Sister"
15. "Ann Orexia"
16. "Beasts in Cages"
17. "Slimy Gash"
18. "Lost in Romance"

== Personnel ==
- Brian Willoughby – electric and acoustic guitars, backing vocals, synthesizer
- John Ford – electric and acoustic guitars, backing vocals, synthesizer
- Terry Cassidy – synthesizer, lead and backing vocals, clarinet
- Richard Hudson – bass, backing vocals, sitar, guitar, synthesizer
- Oliver Pierce – drums, backing vocals, percussion

== Album information ==
- German issue: CBS Records 85 396
- Canadian issue: Polydor PDS 1-6214
- SJPCD 279 (Angel Air 2009 re-release) ASIN: B00000JQLU
