= Tintern (disambiguation) =

Tintern (disambiguation) may refer to:

- Tintern, a village on the west bank of the River Wye in Monmouthshire, Wales
- Tintern (cheese), a Welsh cheese
- Tintern (civil parish, County Wexford), a civil parish in the barony of Shelburne, County Wexford, Ireland
- Tintern Grammar, a private school in Ringwood East, Victoria, Australia
- For articles related to Tintern Abbey see Tintern Abbey (disambiguation)
