= Tomorrow (Strawbs song) =

Song by Strawbs

from the album Grave New World
- Released: February 1972
- Recorded: November 1971
- Genre: Progressive rock
- Length: 4:49
- Label: A&M
- Songwriter(s): Dave Cousins, Tony Hooper, Blue Weaver, John Ford, Richard Hudson
- Producer(s): Strawbs

"Tomorrow" is a song by English band Strawbs credited as a band composition with the main idea by Dave Cousins. The track first appeared on the Grave New World album.

== Lyrical and musical content ==
In the sleeve notes to the 1998 CD release of Grave New World, Dave Cousins revealed that the lyrics referred to his feelings of disappointment about Rick Wakeman and the way he had left the band, without a proper farewell. They are sung in a bitter almost vitriolic fashion.

The music is dominated by electric guitar and organ, Cousins recalls that it was the first time he had played electric guitar on an album and felt comfortable with it. The song ends after an instrumental break; this was reproduced and extended as part of the 1972 live act.

== Personnel ==
- Dave Cousins – lead vocals, electric guitar
- Tony Hooper – acoustic guitar
- Blue Weaver – Hammond organ, piano
- John Ford – bass guitar
- Richard Hudson – drums
