= Tintern Abbey (disambiguation) =

Tintern Abbey may refer to:

- Tintern Abbey, Wales
- Tintern Abbey, County Wexford, Ireland
- "Tintern Abbey" (poem), by William Wordsworth
- Tintern Abbey (band), a rock band in England in the 1960s
