= Ah Me, Ah My =

Song by Strawbs

from the album Grave New World
- Released: February 1972
- Recorded: 1969
- Genre: Progressive rock
- Length: 1:24 on Grave New World 1:22 on Strawberry Sampler Number 1
- Label: A&M
- Songwriter(s): Tony Hooper
- Producer(s): Gus Dudgeon

"Ah Me, Ah My" is a song by English band Strawbs written by Tony Hooper. The track first appeared on the Grave New World album, although it was written and recorded a few years earlier. The original recording was later released on the Strawberry Sampler Number 1 album.

== Personnel ==
- Tony Hooper – vocals

featuring

- "The Gentlemen of the Chorus"
- "Tony Visconti's Old Tyme Orchestra" (actually members of the Ted Heath Orchestra)
