= Just a Collection of Antiques and Curios =

Live album by Strawbs
- Released: November 1970
- Recorded: 11 July 1970
- Venues: Queen Elizabeth Hall, London
- Genres: Art rock; folk rock; progressive rock
- Length: 40:44
- Label: A&M
- Producer: Tony Visconti

Strawbs chronology
Dragonfly (1970)	Just a Collection of Antiques and Curios (1970)	From the Witchwood (1971)

Professional ratings
Review scores
Source	Rating
Allmusic	3/5 stars

Just a Collection of Antiques and Curios is the third album by the Strawbs, mostly recorded live at the Queen Elizabeth Hall in London on 11 July 1970. The album reached number 27 in the UK Albums Chart.

The band line-up had changed from the previous album, Dragonfly. Only founder-members Dave Cousins and Tony Hooper remained; with double bass player Ron Chesterman and cellist Claire Deniz having departed the band, and bassist John Ford, drummer Richard Hudson, and keyboardist Rick Wakeman having joined.

The concert was instrumental in bringing Rick Wakeman's virtuosity to the attention of the music media, when Melody Maker prophesied super-stardom for the keyboard player.

== Track listing ==
"Where is This Dream of Your Youth" was originally released as a studio track on Strawbs.

Side one

1. "Martin Luther King's Dream" (Dave Cousins) – 2:53
2. "The Antique Suite" (Cousins) – 12:12
  "The Reaper"
  "We Must Cross the River"
  "Antiques and Curios"
  "Hey It's Been a Long Time"
3. "Temperament of Mind" (Rick Wakeman) – 4:50

Side two

1. "Fingertips" (Cousins) – 6:14
2. "Song of a Sad Little Girl" (Cousins) – 5:28
3. "Where Is This Dream of Your Youth" (Cousins) – 9:07

Bonus tracks

The following tracks are offered as bonus tracks on the A&M re-issue CD.

7. "The Vision of the Lady of the Lake" (Cousins) – 10:03
8. "We'll Meet Again Sometime" (Cousins) – 4:17
9. "Forever" (Cousins, Tony Hooper) – 3:32

"Forever" is a studio track and was released as a single in 1970. All other tracks were taken from the concert recording.

== Personnel ==
- Dave Cousins – vocals, acoustic guitar, electric guitar, dulcimer
- Tony Hooper – vocals, acoustic guitar, tambourine
- John Ford – vocals, bass guitar
- Rick Wakeman – piano, organ, harpsichord, celeste
- Richard Hudson – vocals, drums, congas, percussion, sitar

== Recording ==
- Produced and mixed by Tony Visconti
- Recorded by Bob Auger

== Charts ==
Chart (1970)	Peak position
UK Albums (Official Charts)	27

== Release history ==
Region	Date	Label	Format	Catalogue
United Kingdom	November 1970	A&M	stereo LP	AMS 994
United States	1970	A&M	stereo LP	SP 4288
Japan	1987	A&M/Canyon	CD	D32Y3524
South Korea	1999	Si-Wan	CD	SRMC 0080
Worldwide	1998	A&M	CD remastered with 3 bonus tracks	540 938-2
