= Strawberry Sampler Number 1 =

Demo album by Strawbs
- Released: 2001
- Recorded: 1969
- Genre: Progressive folk
- Length: 48:59
- Label: Witchwood

Strawbs chronology
Baroque & Roll (2001)	Strawberry Sampler Number 1 (2001)	The Collection (2002)

Strawberry Music Sampler Number 1 is a demo album by English band Strawbs. It was originally released as a publisher's demonstration record, intended to advertise Dave Cousins's and Tony Hooper's songs to other artists. Most of the songs were re-recorded by the band on later albums. ("Ah Me, Ah My" was used unchanged on the Grave New World album.)

The initial white label pressing ran to 99 copies on 12-inch vinyl pressings. There were supposedly only two known vinyl copies in existence, making this one of the UK's most collectible records, but there are suggestions of other copies and it has also been released on CD. In November 2012, a copy was auctioned on eBay and sold for a final bid of £909.88.

== Track listing ==
=== Side one ===
1. "All I Need is You" (Dave Cousins) – 3:07
2. "Stay Awhile With Me" (Cousins) – 2:41
3. "Sail Away to the Sea" (Cousins) – 3:28
4. "Two Weeks Last Summer" (Cousins) – 2:06
5. "Nothing Else Will Do" (Cousins) - 2:16
6. "Who Knows Where the Time Goes" (Sandy Denny) – 4:09
7. "I've Been My Own Worst Friend" (Cousins) – 2:43
8. "I Turned My Face into the Wind" (Cousins) – 2:41
9. "On Growing Older" (Cousins) – 2:00

=== Side two ===
1. "And You Need Me" (Cousins) – 3:16
2. "Ah Me, Ah My" (Tony Hooper) – 1:22
3. "And You Need Me"/"Josephine for Better or for Worse" (Cousins) – 4:29
4. "Just the Same in Every Way" (Cousins) – 3:01
5. "How Everyone But Sam Was a Hypocrite" (Cousins) – 2:47
6. "Young Again" (Hooper) – 2:56
7. "Whichever Way the Wind Blows" (Cousins) – 2:52
8. "Sweetling" (Hooper) – 3:05

== Personnel ==
The personnel are not listed on the album cover but the following is likely:

- Dave Cousins – lead vocals, backing vocals, acoustic guitar, banjo
- Tony Hooper – lead vocals, backing vocals, acoustic guitar
- Sandy Denny – lead vocals, backing vocals, acoustic guitar
- Ron Chesterman – double bass

== Recording ==
No recording details are available.

== Release history ==
Region	Date	Label	Format	Catalogue
	1969	Private pressing	stereo LP	
Worldwide	2001	Witchwood Collection	CD	WC CD2002
