= Hey Little Man ... Wednesday's Child =

Song by Strawbs

from the album Grave New World
- Released: February 1972
- Recorded: November 1971
- Genre: Folk rock
- Length: 1:06
- Label: A&M
- Songwriter(s): Dave Cousins
- Producer(s): Strawbs

"Hey Little Man ... Wednesday's Child" is a song by English band Strawbs written by Dave Cousins. The track is to be found on the Grave New World album and the lyrics depict a father talking to his son. The song can be considered to be a continuation from an earlier track from the same album – "Hey Little Man ... Thursday's Child", which has the same tune but different lyrics. The song is performed solely by Dave Cousins.

== Personnel ==
- Dave Cousins – vocals, acoustic guitar
