= Paul Brett =

English rock guitarist (1947–2024)

Paul Brett (20 June 1947 – 31 January 2024) was an English classic rock guitarist. He played lead guitar with Strawbs (although he was never actually a member), The Overlanders, The Crazy World of Arthur Brown, Elmer Gantry's Velvet Opera, The Velvet Opera, Tintern Abbey, Fire, Roy Harper, Al Stewart, and Lonnie Donegan. He switched to twelve-string guitar in the 1970s.

His first twelve-string guitar suite, Earth Birth, was released on his own label, Phoenix Future, and was produced by artist Ralph Steadman of Fear and Loathing fame. Critical acclaim led to Brett being signed on a four-album deal with RCA Records. His K-tel Romantic Guitar album went gold in the United Kingdom, but Brett stopped recording soon afterwards. He started recording again in 2000, with long-time friend and fellow twelve-string guitarist, John Joyce.

Brett wrote for music magazines Melody Maker, Sound International and International Musician and continued working in the music industry in the later part of his career. He latterly wrote a regular column for Acoustic, a magazine specializing in acoustic guitars. He was also the Associate Editor and Features Writer for Music Maker and Live in London magazines.

He has appeared on BBC Television's Antiques Road Show and Flog It in the mid-2000s.

Brett has worked as a guitar designer for Vintage Guitars in the UK, including The Viator 6 and 12 string travel guitars, The Gemini, The Viaten tenor guitar, and the Paul Brett signature 6 and 12 string guitars. Released in 2017 was the Statesboro' 12 string, which was a tribute to the blues musician, Blind Willie McTell.

== Career ==
In 1967, Brett was a member of The Warren Davis Monday Band. He played on their single, "Wait for Me" bw "I Don't Wanna Hurt You".

In 1973 / 74 he released the album, Clocks.

Paul Brett died on 31 January 2024 of a heart failure.

== Discography ==
=== With other groups ===
- Roy Harper - Sophisticated Beggar LP (Strike Records)
- Al Stewart - "Electric Los Angeles Sunset" single, Zero She Flies LP
- Arthur Brown - "Devil's Grip" / "Give Him a Flower" single
- Tintern Abbey - "Vacuum Cleaner" / "Beeside" single
- Elmer Gantry's Velvet Opera - "Volcano" and "Mary Jane" singles
- The Velvet Opera - "Anna Dance Square" and "Black Jack Davy" singles, Ride a Hustler's Dream LP
- Fire - Magic Shoemaker LP
- Strawbs - Dragonfly and Classic Strawbs LPs

=== Solo material ===
- (as Paul Brett Sage): (Pye / Dawn Records)
  Paul Brett Sage (1970)
  Jubilation Foundry (1971)
  Schizophrenia (1972) * Emergence (2014) Paul Brett Sage
- Eclectic (2017) Paul Brett Sage
- (Bradley's Records) Paul Brett (1973), Clocks (1974)
- (Phoenix Future) Phoenix Future (1975)
- (RCA Records) Earth Birth (1977) - Interlife (1978) - Eclipse (1979) - Guitar Trek (1980)
- (K-tel) Romantic Guitar (1980) - Themes - Themes 2 Great Themes
- (Eclipse) Guitar For All Seasons never released, but 1000 copies pressed.
- (Music Manifold) Music Manifold
- (Albion Music) Transmissions
- Brett & Joyce (Fretdancer) Acoustic Power (2001)
- Collecting Vintage Acoustic Guitars DVD (Fretdancer, 2006)
- 12 String Guitar & Beyond DVD (Fretdancer, 2007)
- Songs from The Compleat Angler CD (Fretdancer, 2009)

== Other work ==
Brett also performed as a session musician with The Ivy League, The Flower Pot Men, Carter & Lewis, Hudson Ford, Johnny Joyce, Michel Polnareff, Max Bygraves, The Cyril Stapleton Orchestra, Lonnie Donegan, Ralph McTell, Neil Christian, Status Quo, Paul King, Barclay James Harvest, Tom Newman and The Overlanders.

In 2012 he set up and managed the annual Llyn Acoustic Guitar Festival in North Wales.
