= Bad Habits (The Monks album) =

Studio album by The Monks
- Released: 1979
- Genres: Punk rock, new wave
- Label: EMI
- Producers: Richard Hudson, John Ford, and Terry Cassidy

The Monks chronology
Bad Habits (1979)	Suspended Animation (1981)

Singles from Bad Habits
- 1. "Nice Legs Shame About Her Face" Released: 1979; 2. "Ain't Gettin' Any" Released: 1979; 3. "Johnny B. Rotten" Released: 1979; 4. "Drugs in My Pocket" Released: 1979

Bad Habits is an album by The Monks, released in 1979. It is a spoof of punk rock led by the former rhythm section of the trad rockers, Strawbs. The songs are composed by Richard Hudson, John Ford and Terry Cassidy. The album was surprisingly, and nearly exclusively, very popular in Canada, but made no impact in the United States, and very little in the band's native United Kingdom.

"Nice Legs Shame About Her Face" was a number 19 hit single in the UK Singles Chart.

While the album failed to produce further UK chart success, the band were very popular in Canada. "Drugs in My Pocket" was a Top 20 single in Canada in the fall of 1980, and Bad Habits earned double platinum certification in 1982.

In 2004, Ford rerecorded "Nice Legs Shame About Her Face" on his solo album Backtracking, released on Whole Shot Records.

In 2012, the Canadian musician Thomas D'Arcy organized The Monks Bad Habits Tribute show at the Horseshoe Tavern in Toronto, which featured Ford and members of Sloan, The New Pornographers, Change of Heart, and released a track-by-track cover album. In addition to Canadian musicians such as Chris Colohan, John Kastner, Ian Blurton, and Chris Murphy, Ford contributed to the album. Ford was presented with a double-platinum award for Bad Habits from EMI at the concert.

== Track listing ==
1. "Johnny B. Rotten" (Hudson, Ford, Cassidy)
2. "Drugs in My Pocket" (Hudson, Ford, Cassidy)
3. "Love in Stereo" (Hudson, Ford)
4. "Bad Habits" (Hudson, Ford, Cassidy)
5. "Spotty Face" (Cassidy)
6. "Dear Jerry, Don't Try To Kill Me With Your Love, Norman" (Hudson, Ford)
7. "Nice Legs Shame About Her Face" (Hudson, Ford)
8. "Inter-City Kitty" (Hudson, Ford, Cassidy)
9. "Out of Work Musician" (Hudson, Ford)
10. "Ain't Gettin' Any" (Hudson, Ford)
11. "No Shame" (Hudson, Ford)
12. "Skylab (Theme from the Monks)" (Hudson, Ford, Cassidy)

== Album information ==
- Catalog: #14849
- ASIN: B00000729R
