= Lindsay L. Cooper =

Scottish bassist and cellist (1940–2001)

- Born: 18 January 1940; Glasgow, Scotland
- Died: 19 June 2001 (aged 61) Edinburgh, Scotland
- Genres: Jazz; rock; free improvisation
- Occupation: Musician
- Instruments: Bass guitar; double bass; cello
- Years active: 1965–2000
- Formerly of: The Strawbs

Lindsay L. Cooper (18 January 1940 – 19 June 2001) was a Scottish double bass, bass guitar and cello player. He spent four years working as a ship's musician and had performed and recorded with a number of other musicians and bands, including Michael Jackson, Boy George, Derek Bailey and Mike Oldfield.

A native of Glasgow, Cooper moved to London in 1965 where he became a professional musician. From 1965 to 1967 and again in 1970, he worked as a ship's musician on the Queen Mary and P&O passenger liner ships. In 1972 and 1973, Cooper studied music with British double bassist and teacher Peter Ind. In 1978 he moved to Zürich, but returned to Scotland in 1990 where he ran a free improvisation workshop in Edinburgh.

Among the musicians with whom Cooper performed and recorded were Evan Parker, Keith Tippett, Kenny Wheeler, Ken Colyer, Bobby Bradford and Lol Coxhill. He also recorded with Strawbs, the Bill Wells Octet and a number of other jazz, rock and folk groups. His main musical influences included Thelonious Monk, King Oliver and Derek Bailey.

Lindsay L. Cooper died in Edinburgh at the age of 61.

== Selected discography ==
- Mike Oldfield, Tubular Bells (1973)
- Ken Hyder’s Talisker, Dreaming of Glenisla (1975)
- Amalgam, Innovation (1975)
- Spontaneous Music Orchestra, SME+=SMO (1975)
- Day & Taxi, All (1992)
- Christoph Gallio, Cars & Variations / High Desert Songs (1994)
- Andy Shanks/Jim Russell, Diamonds In The Night (1997)
- Pearlfishers, Across The Milky Way (2001)
- Bill Wells Octet/Lol Coxhill, Bill Wells Octet meets Lol Coxhill (2002)
- Strawbs, Strawbs Live in Tokyo DVD, plus Grave New World, the movie (2003)
