= All Our Own Work =

- Pickwick SHM 813, UK, 1973

Studio album by Sandy Denny and the Strawbs
- Released: 1973
- Recorded: Copenhagen, Denmark, July 1967
- Genre: Progressive folk
- Length: 32:56
- Label: Pickwick
- Producer: Gustav Winckler

Strawbs chronology
Bursting at the Seams (1973)	All Our Own Work (1973)	Hero and Heroine (1974)

All Our Own Work is an album by Sandy Denny and the Strawbs, recorded in 1967 but not released until 1973. The album was recorded in Copenhagen, Denmark, and contains an early recording of one of Sandy Denny's best known songs "Who Knows Where the Time Goes?". Denny later recorded this song as a member of Fairport Convention. The album was released by Pickwick Records, who in the 1970s specialised in budget releases of deleted record company catalogues.

== Production ==
Dave Cousins, the leader of the Strawbs, saw Sandy Denny singing in a nightclub, and invited her to join his band. A demo recording the band made with Denny was passed by a British born Danish DJ, Tom Browne, to Karl Knudsen, the head of Sonet Records in Denmark, who offered them a record deal, and brought them over to Copenhagen. They recorded the album in a cinema in 1967, with Gustav Winckler as producer. Cousins wrote the bulk of the songs, though Denny contributed "Who Knows Where the Time Goes?". Shortly after the recording, Denny left the Strawbs to join Fairport Convention, with whom she also recorded "Who Knows Where the Time Goes?". The Strawbs recorded and released their official debut album, Strawbs (without Denny), in 1969.

== Release ==
Pickwick Records, who in the 1970s specialised in budget releases of deleted record company catalogues, released the album in the UK in 1973 on their Hallmark label. A remastered version was released in 2010 by Witchwood Records.

== Track listing ==
=== Side one ===
1. "On My Way" (Dave Cousins) – 3:03
2. "Who Knows Where the Time Goes?" (Sandy Denny) – 4:04
3. "Tell Me What You See in Me" (Cousins) – 3:38
4. "Always on My Mind" (Tony Hooper) – 1:51
5. "Stay Awhile with Me" (Cousins) – 2:24
6. "Wild Strawberries" (Cousins, Hooper) – 1:32

=== Side two ===
1. "All I Need Is You" (Cousins) – 2:19
2. "How Everyone But Sam Was a Hypocrite" (Cousins) – 2:43
3. "Sail Away to the Sea" (Cousins) – 3:22
4. "Sweetling" (Hooper) – 2:34
5. "Nothing Else Will Do" (Cousins) – 2:13
6. "And You Need Me" (Cousins) – 3:13

=== 2010 reissue ===
The 2010 reissue on CD is produced by Chris Tsangarides and contains the following additional tracks:

1. "Two Weeks Last Summer" (Cousins) (Sandy Denny lead vocal) – 2:18
2. "Nothing Else Will Do" (Cousins) (Sandy Denny lead vocal) – 2:13
3. "Tell Me What You See in Me" (Cousins) (with sitar and percussion) – 3:36
4. "Who Knows Where the Time Goes" (Denny) (original complete recording with string section) – 4:06
5. "Stay Awhile with Me" (Cousins) (original complete recording with string section) – 2:24
6. "And You Need Me" (Cousins) – 3:15
7. "I've Been My Own Worst Friend" (Cousins) – 2:37
8. "Poor Jimmy Wilson" (Cousins) – 2:32
9. "Strawberry Picking" (Cousins, Hooper) – 1:34
10. "Pieces of 79 and 15" (Cousins, Hooper) – 2:18
11. "The Falling Leaves" (Cousins) – 2:30
12. "Indian Summer" (Cousins) – 2:18

Tracks 1 to 9 contain outtakes, demos, and original versions (with the strings that were omitted on the Hallmark release). These were all previously released on Sandy Denny and the Strawbs in 1991. Tracks 10 to 12 are previously unreleased demos.

== Personnel ==
- Sandy Denny – lead vocals, backing vocals, acoustic guitar
- Dave Cousins – lead vocals, backing vocals, acoustic guitar, banjo
- Tony Hooper – lead vocals, backing vocals, acoustic guitar
- Ron Chesterman – double bass

Additional personnel

- Ken Gudmand – drums
- Cy Nicklin – sitar
- Svend Lundvig – string arrangements

== Recording ==
Recorded in Copenhagen, Denmark July 1967

- Gustav Winckler – producer
- Karl Emil Knudsen – co-ordination
- Ivar Rosenberg – engineer

== Release history ==
Region	Date	Label	Format	Catalog
United Kingdom	1973	Pickwick	stereo LP	SHM 813
Australia	1973	Summit	stereo LP	SRA 088
Canada	1973	Pickwick	stereo LP	SPI-7019
