= Heartbreak Hill (album) =

Studio album by Strawbs
- Released: 10 July 1995
- Recorded: 1978
- Genre: Progressive rock
- Length: 44:15 (51:38 inc. bonus track)
- Label: Road Goes on Forever
- Producer: Tom Allom

Strawbs chronology
Greatest Hits Live (1993)	Heartbreak Hill (1995)	Strawbs in Concert (1995)

Alternative Album Cover
- Platinum Edition cover

Professional ratings
Review scores
Source	Rating
Allmusic	2.5/5 stars

Heartbreak Hill is the fifteenth studio album by English band Strawbs. The album was recorded in 1978 but, due to record deal and management difficulties, was not released until 1995. The recording schedule conflicted with guitarist Dave Lambert's plans to record a solo album, so session musicians Jo Partridge and Miller Anderson were recruited to supply electric guitar.

The album was the first to feature keyboardist Andy Richards as part of the band line-up.

== Track listing ==
1. "Something for Nothing" (Dave Cousins, Chas Cronk) – 7:23
2. "Another Day Without You" (Cousins) – 2:57
3. "We Can Make it Together" (Cousins, Cronk) – 4:18
4. "Heartbreak Hill" (Cousins, Cronk) – 7:31
5. "Starting Over" (Cousins, Andy Richards) – 10:48
6. "Two Separate People" (Cousins, Cronk, Richards, Tony Fernandez) – 2:55
7. "Desert Song" (Cousins) – 4:19
8. "Let it Rain" (Cousins, Cronk, Richards) – 4:04

=== Bonus track ===
The Platinum CD edition of the album includes the track

1. "Something for Nothing (The Whiplash Mix)" (Cousins, Cronk) – 7:23

== Personnel ==
- Dave Cousins – lead vocals, backing vocals, acoustic guitar
- Chas Cronk – bass guitar, backing vocals
- Tony Fernandez – drums, percussion
- Andy Richards – keyboards
- Dave Lambert – guitar on track 1

Additional personnel

- Jo Partridge – electric guitar, mandolin, vocals
- Miller Anderson – guitar on track 3, vocals on tracks 3 and 8

== Recording ==
- Tom Allom – Producer

== References in popular culture ==
The album was referred to in a Viz cartoon strip entitled "Spot The Clue with Tim Westwood". The strip was a detective story in which, in a bizarre twist, the killer was caught after claiming that they had been listening to a selection of vinyl LPs including Heartbreak Hill, which due to the various legal issues surrounding its release had not been issued on vinyl at the time the strip was published.

== Release history ==
Region	Date	Label	Format	Catalog
United Kingdom	1995	Road Goes on Forever	CD	RGF/WC CD024
United Kingdom	2006	Witchwood Media	CD	WMCD 2033
