= Tintern Abbey (band) =

British psychedelic rock band

- Origin: London, England
- Genres: Psychedelic rock
- Years active: 1967–1968
- Label: Deram Records
- Past members: Don Smith; David MacTavish; Stuart MacKay; John Dalton; Paul Brett; Terry Goldberg

Tintern Abbey were a British psychedelic rock band that were formed in late 1966 and professionally active between 1967 and 1968. The band are best remembered for their single "Vacuum Cleaner," which has been included on several compilation albums over the years.

== History ==
Tintern Abbey were formed by Don Smith after meeting David MacTavish at the Overseas Visitors Club in Earl's Court London. Smith brought John Dalton into the band after a meeting in The Cromwellian club in South Kensington and MacTavish brought Stuart MacKay into the band after a meeting at the dole office. Smith left the band after the release of "Beeside"/"Vacuum Cleaner" and completing work on "Snowman". MacTavish was later a member of Big Bertha and Velvet Opera, the latter of which latter-day Tintern Abbey guitarist Paul Brett also later joined.

The band released only one 45 rpm single on Deram Records, "Beeside"/"Vacuum Cleaner" (Deram 164), in December 1967. Produced by Jonathan Webber, the single failed to sell. At this point the proposed follow up was a song called "Snowman" which had reached mastering stage when Smith left the group. After Smith's leaving, Paul Brett joined as a guitarist. Also, organist Terry Goldberg, originally of the Mark Leeman Five joined to the band. "How Do I Feel Today"/"Do What You Must", was slated for an April 1968 release but never appeared. A full-length LP was allegedly meant to follow in August 1968, but the group had disbanded by then.

Since the band's breakup, the single "Beeside"/"Vacuum Cleaner" has been highly sought after by collectors (selling at £1000 plus) and has been hailed as one of the best examples of British psychedelia. As such, the band has become something of a cult favourite. Among other places, "Vacuum Cleaner" was re-released on the Nuggets II compilation.

A 7-inch vinyl EP was released by Brett and Dalton in 2006 of four of the band's 1968-era demo songs, including "How Do I Feel Today", as a benefit for Oxfam. These songs were recorded in 1968 at Tony Pike's studios in Putney, London, but never released until recently and they are the only copies of the original acetates. Brett has a collection of songs from that era that he wrote for submission to the LP that never was, including a setting of Edgar Allan Poe's "The Pit and the Pendulum". All recordings were collected on the 2024 anthology Beeside (The Complete Recordings).

Dave MacTavish as a solo artist released one single "Ooh La La" b/w "Collie Girl" on the Young Blood label, in 1973 according to the label dates (then in Germany under "Decca" – license – DL 25564).

== Discography ==
=== Singles ===
- "Beeside" / "Vacuum Cleaner" (Deram DM 164) 1967

=== EPs ===
- Do What You Must (Self-released) 2006

=== CDs ===
- "Beeside" can be found on The Rubble Collection 6 (Bam Caruso)
- "Vacuum Cleaner" can be found on the Rhino Nuggets II box set
- Four demos ("Do What You Must" / "How Do I Feel Today?" / "Naked Song" / "It's Just That The People Can't See") can be found on What's The Rush, Time Machine Man? a 2007 CD on UK Rev-Ola
- A demo of "Tanya" is on disc one of Let's Go Down and Blow Our Minds, a 2016 box set from Grapefruit Records
