= Oh How She Changed =

1968 debut single by Strawbs

Single by Strawbs

from the album Strawbs
- B-side: "Or Am I Dreaming"
- Released: June 21, 1968
- Genre: Progressive folk
- Label: A&M
- Songwriters: Dave Cousins, Tony Hooper
- Producer: Gus Dudgeon

Strawbs singles chronology
"Oh How She Changed" (1968)	"The Man Who Called Himself Jesus" (1968)

Official audio
- "Oh How She Changed" on YouTube

"Oh How She Changed" is a song by English band Strawbs written by Dave Cousins and Tony Hooper. It was the first single to be released by Strawbs and later appeared on their 1969 album Strawbs. An alternative mix of the song appears on the 2006 box set A Taste of Strawbs and a re-working on 2009's Dancing to the Devil's Beat.

== B-side ==
The B-side track "Or Am I Dreaming", written by Dave Cousins, also appeared on the album Strawbs.

== Personnel ==
- Dave Cousins – vocals, acoustic guitar
- Tony Hooper – vocals, acoustic guitar, percussion
- Ron Chesterman – double bass

== Release history ==
Region	Date	Label	Format	Catalog
United Kingdom	June 21, 1968	A&M	stereo 7" single	AMS 725
Denmark	1968	Sonet	7" single	T 7256
United States	June 18, 1968	A&M	7" single	AMS 944
