= Fire (English band) =

(1960s–1970s) English rock band

- Born: England
- Past members: Dave Lambert (later of Strawbs); Paul Brett; Bob Voice

Fire was a late 1960s/early 1970s English band that consisted of Dave Lambert (who later joined Strawbs), Bob Voice and Dick Dufall (Paul Brett Sage). Brett himself joined them for their now classic Magic Shoemaker LP recorded at Pye Studios London, in 1970. This vinyl LP has been in the UK's top 10 of collectable vinyl, being listed in Millers Antique Collectable guide. A 2008 archival release, The Magic Shoemaker Live, features live recordings of the original Fire line up, plus Paul Brett and Dave Cousins (Strawbs), with Ray Hammond as the narrator.

== Discography ==
- "Father's Name Is Dad"/"Treacle Toffee World" (1968)
- "Round the Gum Tree"/"Toothie Ruthie" (1968)
- Magic Shoemaker
- The Magic Shoemaker Live
