= The Monks (British band) =

English rock band

- Origin: England
- Genres: New wave, pop punk
- Years active: 1979–1982
- Labels: EMI, Polygram
- Past members: John Ford; Richard Hudson; Terry Cassidy; Clive Pierce; Brian Willoughby; Chris Parren; Huw Gower

The Monks were a British pop punk/new wave band, formed in the late 1970s by three former members of Strawbs—Richard Hudson (guitar), John Ford (vocals, guitars, synthesisers) and Brian Willoughby—along with Terry Cassidy (vocals and synthesisers) and Clive Pierce (drums).

== History ==
Their first album, Bad Habits, was recorded and released in 1979 after the success of "Nice Legs Shame About Her Face", which reached number 19 in the UK Singles Chart. The song was a demo that was not intended for release. It was offered to another band who turned it down before French record label Carrere Records released it in its original form; the art department misheard the original choice for the band name of "The Mugs", crafting it as "The Monks". Ford later commented in Mojo magazine that "it was a bit of a problem when it was a hit." The album failed to produce further UK chart success, however — the British punk audience turned against the band, dismissing them as inauthentic punks, once it became widely known that they had been associated with the Strawbs. In an appearance on the television programme Juke Box Jury, Johnny Rotten derided the Monks as "patronising rubbish" when reviewing "I Ain't Gettin' Any" and as a poor imitation of the Sex Pistols.

The band had more significant success in Canada, pushing the single "Drugs in My Pocket" into the national Top 20. The single was an especially big hit in Toronto, peaking at #4 on the CHUM Chart. The Canadian audience lacked the Strawbs baggage, and, according to Ford, were thus more willing to "take the album for what it was".

They dabbled with 1930s-style music in 1980 as High Society, before recording a follow-up Monks album, Suspended Animation, which was released exclusively in Canada in 1981. They supported the album with a 21-day tour of Ontario, with the most notable venue on the tour being a show at Toronto's Massey Hall. Chris Parren (keyboards) joined the band for that album, and Willoughby was replaced by Huw Gower during the supporting tour in 1982.

Suspended Animation went gold in Canada, while sales of Bad Habits reached double platinum certification in 1982.

The band later recorded several tracks for a third album to be titled Cybernetic Sister, but the album was never released. A CD reissue of Suspended Animation in the 1990s included six bonus tracks from the aborted recording sessions.

== Legacy ==
In 2004, Ford rerecorded "Nice Legs Shame About Her Face" and "Suspended Animation" on his solo album Backtracking, released on Whole Shot Records.

In 2012, Canadian musician Thomas D'Arcy organized The Monk's Bad Habits Tribute, a tribute concert to the band, at Toronto's Horseshoe Tavern. D'Arcy performed alongside a lineup of Canadian musicians, including Chris Colohan, John Kastner, Ian Blurton, Kurt Dahle, Ryan Dahle and Chris Murphy, performing tracks from Bad Habits; at this show, Ford was presented with his double platinum certification plaque for the album's Canadian sales. All of the musicians involved in the show, including Ford, also participated in the recording of a track-by-track tribute album, A Tribute to the Monks, which was distributed as a free download from D'Arcy's website.

Their song "Ain't Gettin' Any" was covered by The Slickee Boys, and appears on their live album A Postcard from the Day.

== Personnel ==
- John Ford - guitars, vocals, synthesisers (1979-1980, 1981-1982)
- Richard Hudson - bass, vocals, guitars, sitar, synthesisers (1979-1980, 1981-1982)
- Terry Cassidy - vocals, synthesisers (1979-1980, 1981-1982)
- Clive Pierce - drums (1979-1980, 1981-1982)
- Brian Willoughby - guitars (1979-1980, 1981)
- Miffy Smith - keyboards (1981-1982)
- Huw Gower - guitars (1982)

Hudson Ford / The Monks Timeline

== Discography ==
=== Albums ===
- Bad Habits (1979)
- Suspended Animation (1981) (originally released in Canada only)

=== Singles ===
Year	Single	Peak chart positions	
Year	Single	UK	CAN
1979	"Nice Legs Shame About Her Face"	19	―
1979	"I Ain't Gettin' Any"	―	―
1979	"Johnny B. Rotten"	―	―
1979	"Drugs In My Pocket"	―	18
1980	"Don't Want No Reds"	―	―
1981	"I Can Do Anything You Like"	―	―
"—" denotes releases that did not chart or were not released.
