= Elmer Gantry's Velvet Opera =

British rock band

- Also known as: Velvet Opera
- Origin: England
- Genres: Soul blues; rock; psychedelic rock; freakbeat
- Years active: 1967–1971
- Past members: Richard Hudson; John Ford; Elmer Gantry; Colin Forster; Jimmy Horrocks; Paul Brett; Johnny Joyce; Colin Bass; Dave MacTavish; Mike Fincher

Elmer Gantry's Velvet Opera, at various times also known as Velvet Opera, were a British rock band active in the late 1960s. Members of the band, Richard Hudson, John Ford and Paul Brett, would later become members of The Strawbs, Hudson Ford and Stretch.

== History ==
The group emerged from a soul/blues band called The Five Proud Walkers. After supporting Pink Floyd on tour, they were inspired to change their approach and become a more psychedelic outfit. The band consolidated as Richard Hudson on drums, John Ford on bass, Colin Forster on lead guitar, Jimmy Horrocks (Horovitz) on organ and flute (who left early in the band's history), and Dave Terry on vocals and harmonica. Initially just calling themselves Velvet Opera, they developed their full name when Terry took to wearing a cape and preacher's hat in the style of the title character in the 1960 film adaptation of Sinclair Lewis' novel Elmer Gantry.

They started to make club appearances in London, using electronic backing sounds, and secured a record deal with the short-lived Direction Records subsidiary of CBS Records in the UK. Their first recording was the single "Flames" (November 1967), which also appeared on the CBS sampler record The Rock Machine Turns You On, and was later covered on stage by Led Zeppelin. Further singles and a self-titled album followed, including the track "Mary Jane", which was taken off the BBC playlist after they realised its drug connotations, although the band continued to make regular live appearances on John Peel's Radio 1 programme Top Gear and other BBC radio shows. Around this time, Terry, as lead singer of the band, was regularly being approached as "Elmer." The band found this amusing and joined in and the name stuck: Dave Terry became (and remains) Elmer Gantry.

However, the recording success of the band was limited, and Forster left to be replaced by Paul Brett, who had worked with Gantry in ex–Arthur Brown backing band The High Society. When Brett, Hudson and Ford wanted to take the band in a different direction, Elmer Gantry was the next to depart. The band reverted to the name Velvet Opera, took on 12-string guitarist John Joyce, and released a second album, Ride a Hustler's Dream. This again failed to achieve success, and in 1970 Ford left (to be replaced by Colin Bass), followed by Richard Hudson, both of them joining The Strawbs shortly afterwards. At this point the band dissolved.

In 1971, Forster and Bass formed a new version of Velvet Opera with ex–Tintern Abbey vocalist Dave MacTavish and drummer Mike Fincher. Short-lived, they recorded one single on the Spark Records label.

Meanwhile, Gantry formed The Elmer Gantry Band with ex-members of the Downliners Sect (whose bass player was Paul Martinez, later to also be a member of what became known as The Fake Fleetwood Mac and Stretch). The Gantry band gigged for about 18 months before Gantry joined the cast of Hair in order to sit out his contracts. In 1974, at the invitation of Mick Fleetwood and Clifford Davis he agreed, along with musical partner Kirby Gregory of Curved Air, to join Fleetwood Mac for a tour of the US. In the event, Mick Fleetwood never arrived for the start of the tour, which collapsed in litigation with some of the members of Fleetwood Mac. Members of the band later re-formed as Stretch and recorded what has since become a classic track, "Why Did You Do It?", written by Kirby about Mick Fleetwood's actions around the "Fake Mac" saga. Stretch recorded three studio albums, Elastique, You Can't Beat Your Brain For Entertainment and Life Blood. Later, Gantry recorded with The Alan Parsons Project and sang lead vocals on the tracks "May Be a Price to Pay" on The Turn of a Friendly Card and "Psychobabble" on Eye in the Sky. He also provided lead vocals for Cozy Powell's solo album Tilt and sang and wrote for Jon Lord's solo album Before I Forget. More recently, Stretch released the John Peel BBC Sessions and a newly recorded album, Unfinished Business.

== Members ==
- Richard Hudson – drums, sitar (1967–1970)
- John Ford – bass (1967–1970)
- Dave Terry a.k.a. "Elmer Gantry" – vocals, guitar, harmonica (1967–1968)
- Colin Forster – lead guitar (1967–1968, 1969–1971)
- Jimmy Horrocks (Horovitz) – organ, flute (1967)
- Paul Brett – guitar, vocals (1968)
- Johnny Joyce – guitar, vocals (1969–1970; died 2004)
- Colin Bass – bass (1970–1971)
- Dave MacTavish – vocals (1971)
- Mike Fincher – drums (1971)

== Discography ==
=== Albums ===
- Elmer Gantry's Velvet Opera - Direction S8-63300 (July 1968)
- Ride a Hustler's Dream (September 1969)

=== Singles ===
- "Flames"/"Salisbury Plain"
- "Mary Jane"/"Dreamy"
- "Volcano"/"A Quick B"
- "Anna Dance Square"/"Don't You Realise"
- "Black Jack Davy"/"Statesboro Blues"
- "She Keeps Giving Me These Feelings"/"There's a Hole In My Pocket"
