= Grave New World =

Studio album by Strawbs
- Released: February 1972
- Recorded: November 1971
- Genre: Folk rock; progressive rock
- Length: 36:31
- Label: A&M (UK)
- Producer: Strawbs

Strawbs chronology
From the Witchwood (1971)	Grave New World (1972)	Bursting at the Seams (1973)

Singles from Grave New World
- 1. "Benedictus"

Professional ratings
Review scores
Source	Rating
AllMusic	4.5/5 stars
The Encyclopedia of Popular Music	4/5 stars
Christgau's Record Guide	D

Grave New World is the fourth studio album by English band Strawbs, their fifth overall. It was the first album to be released after the departure of Rick Wakeman, who was replaced by Blue Weaver, late of Amen Corner.

== Background ==
Tony Visconti influenced Dave Cousins to buy an I Ching book; Cousins used the book to decide what he should do after Wakeman had left the band. The answer was used in the lyrics for the first track on the album, "Benedictus". The songs themselves show the continuation of the movement away from Strawbs' original folk leanings. Founding member Tony Hooper was increasingly uncomfortable with this and left after the recording sessions of this album.

The original vinyl album had lavish artwork and included a pamphlet showing the lyrics of each track together with details of instrumentation. The front cover is a reproduction of William Blake's Glad Day.

The album reached number 11 in the UK Albums Chart.

== Track listing ==
Side one

1. "Benedictus" (Dave Cousins) – 4:24
2. "Hey Little Man ... Thursday's Child" (Cousins) – 1:06
3. "Queen of Dreams" (Cousins) – 5:32
4. "Heavy Disguise" (John Ford) – 2:53
5. "New World" (Cousins) – 4:11
6. "Hey Little Man ... Wednesday's Child" (Cousins) – 1:06

Side two

1. "The Flower and the Young Man" (Cousins) – 4:17
2. "Tomorrow" (Cousins, Tony Hooper, Ford, Blue Weaver, Richard Hudson) – 4:49
3. "On Growing Older" (Cousins) – 1:56
4. "Ah Me, Ah My" (Hooper) – 1:24
5. "Is It Today, Lord?" (Hudson) – 3:07
6. "The Journey's End" (Cousins, Weaver) – 1:46

Bonus tracks – A&M 1998 reissue CD

1. "Here it Comes" (Cousins) – 2:42
2. "I'm Going Home" (Cousins) – 3:14

"I'm Going Home" originally appeared on Dave Cousins's solo album Two Weeks Last Summer. This track is the first occasion on which Dave Lambert recorded with the band. He had occasionally been appearing on stage for encores, but after this album and the departure of Tony Hooper, Lambert joined the band full-time.

== Personnel ==
Strawbs

- Dave Cousins – lead vocals, backing vocals, acoustic guitar, electric guitar, dulcimer, recorder
- Tony Hooper – lead vocals, backing vocals, acoustic guitar, autoharp, tambourine
- Blue Weaver – organ, piano, harmonium, mellotron, clavioline on "The Flower and the Young Man"
- John Ford – lead vocals, backing vocals, bass guitar, acoustic guitar
- Richard Hudson – backing vocals, drums, sitar, tablas

Additional personnel

- Trevor Lucas, Anne Collins – backing vocals on "Benedictus"
- Robert Kirby – arranger ("Heavy Disguise")
- Tony Visconti – arranger ("Ah Me, Ah My")

The track "Ah Me, Ah, My" credits "The Gentlemen of the Chorus" with vocals and "Tony Visconti's Old Tyme Dance Orchestra" (actually the Ted Heath Orchestra) as musicians.

== Recording ==
Recorded mainly at Morgan Studios, London with additional work at Island Studios and Landsdowne Studios.

Produced by Dave Cousins, Richard Hudson, John Ford, Blue Weaver and Tony Hooper

- Tom Allom – engineer at Morgan Studios
- Martin Levan – assistant engineer
- Frank Owen – engineer at Island Studios
- John Mackswith – engineer at Landsdowne Studios
- Tony Visconti – producer, "Benedictus"
- Gus Dudgeon – original producer, "Ah Me, Ah My"

== Charts ==
Chart (1972)	Peak position
Australian Albums (Kent Music Report)	49
UK Albums (OCC)	11
US Billboard 200	191

== Release history ==
Region	Date	Label	Format	Catalog
United Kingdom	February 1972	A&M	stereo LP	AMLH 66078
United States	February 1972	A&M	stereo LP	SP 4344
Japan	1987	A&M/Canyon	CD	D32Y3578
South Korea	1997	Si-Wan	CD	SRMC 0075
Worldwide	1998	A&M	remastered CD	540,934-2
