= From the Witchwood =

Studio album by Strawbs
- Released: July 1971
- Recorded: February–March 1971
- Studios: AIR (London, UK)
- Genres: Progressive rock; art rock; folk rock
- Length: 38:11
- Label: A&M
- Producer: Tony Visconti

Strawbs chronology
Just a Collection of Antiques and Curios (1970)	From the Witchwood (1971)	Grave New World (1972)

Professional ratings
Review scores
Source	Rating
Allmusic	4/5 stars
Encyclopedia of Popular Music	3/5 stars

From the Witchwood is the third studio album by the English band Strawbs. It was recorded at Air Studios in London during February and March 1971 and reached number 39 in the UK Albums Chart on 17 July 1971.

It is the third and final album to include Rick Wakeman as an official band member, including his appearance as a session musician on the 1970 album Dragonfly. He would eventually return to help the band as a session musician on the 1975 album Nomadness, on which he played on one track. The sleeve illustration was "The Vision of St. Jerome", a tapestry from the Spanish royal collection.

== Track listing ==
All tracks are written by Dave Cousins, except where noted.

Side one
No.	Title	Writer(s)	Length
1.	"A Glimpse of Heaven"		3:50
2.	"Witchwood"		3:23
3.	"Thirty Days"	John Ford	2:52
4.	"Flight"	Richard Hudson	4:24
5.	"The Hangman and the Papist"		4:11

Side two
No.	Title	Writer(s)	Length
6.	"Sheep"		4:14
7.	"Canon Dale"	Hudson	3:46
8.	"The Shepherd's Song"		4:34
9.	"In Amongst the Roses"		3:48
10.	"I'll Carry On Beside You"		3:09
Total length:			38:11

A&M "Remasterpieces" CD reissue bonus track
No.	Title	Writer(s)	Length
11.	"Keep the Devil Outside"	Ford	3:02

== Personnel ==
Strawbs

- Dave Cousins – lead vocals, backing vocals, acoustic guitar, electric guitar, dulcimer, banjo, recorder
- Tony Hooper – lead vocals, backing vocals, acoustic guitar, autoharp, tambourine
- Rick Wakeman – piano, organ, celeste, mellotron, Moog synthesizer, clavinet, harpsichord
- John Ford – lead vocals, backing vocals, bass guitar
- Richard Hudson – lead vocals, backing vocals, drums, sitar

with:

- The Choir and Congregation of Air Strawb - choir on "A Glimpse of Heaven"

== Recording ==
- Tony Visconti – producer
- Bill Price – engineer
- Alan Harris – engineer
- John Punter – engineer
- Chris Michie – engineer

== Charts ==
Chart (1971)	Peak position
UK Albums (Official Charts)	39

== Release history ==
Region	Date	Label	Format	Catalog
United Kingdom	July 1971	A&M	stereo LP	AMLH 64304
United States	July 1971	A&M	stereo LP	SP 4304
Denmark	1971	Sonet	stereo LP	SLPS 1531
Italy	1971	A&M	stereo LP	SLAM 64304
Canada	1971	A&M	stereo LP	SP 4304
New Zealand	1971	A&M	stereo LP	SAML-934437
Japan	1987	A&M/Canyon	CD	D32Y3578
Russia	1998	ArsNova	CD	AN99-061
Worldwide	1998	A&M	CD remastered with bonus track	540 939-2
