= Strawbs (album) =

Studio album by Strawbs
- Released: May 23, 1969
- Recorded: 1969
- Genre: Progressive folk
- Length: 38:04
- Label: A&M
- Producer: Gus Dudgeon

Strawbs chronology
Strawbs (1969)	Dragonfly (1970)

Strawbs is the first album released by the English band Strawbs. The Sandy Denny & The Strawbs LP All Our Own Work was recorded earlier, but not released until 1973.

Not initially issued in the US, US A&M did issue two singles ("Oh How She's Changed" b/w "Or Am I Dreaming", and "The Man Who Called Himself Jesus" b/w "Poor Jimmy Wilson").

== Track listing ==
All tracks written by Dave Cousins, except where noted.

Side one
No.	Title	Writer(s)	Length
1.	"The Man Who Called Himself Jesus"		3:53
2.	"That Which Once Was Mine"		2:49
3.	"All the Little Ladies"	Cousins, Tony Hooper	2:18
4.	"Pieces of 79 and 15"	Cousins, Hooper	3:00
5.	"Tell Me What You See In Me"		5:01
6.	"Oh How She Changed"	Cousins, Hooper	2:54

Side two
No.	Title	Length
7.	"Or Am I Dreaming?"	2:25
8.	"Where Is This Dream of Your Youth"	3:06
9.	"Poor Jimmy Wilson"	2:37
10.	"Where Am I? / I'll Show You Where to Sleep"	3:27
11.	"The Battle"	6:34

A&M 2008 release bonus tracks
No.	Title	Length
12.	"Interview / That Which Once Was Mine"	3:41
13.	"Poor Jimmy Wilson"	2:28
14.	"The Battle"	6:09

These tracks were recorded on January 12, 1969 for John Peel's "Top Gear" radio show on BBC Radio 1.

== Personnel ==
Strawbs

- Dave Cousins – guitars, lead and backing vocals
- Tony Hooper – guitars, lead and backing vocals
- Ron Chesterman – double bass

Additional personnel

- John Paul Jones – bass guitar
- Nicky Hopkins – piano
- Richard Wilson – spoken words
- Nosrati and his Arab Friends - Arab string section on "Tell Me What You See in Me".

== Recording ==
- Gus Dudgeon – producer and engineer
- Tony Visconti - arranger
- Tom Wilkes - art direction
- Barry Feinstein, Ray Stevenson - photography

== Release history ==
Region	Date	Label	Format	Catalogue	Comments
United Kingdom	May 1969	A&M Records	stereo LP	AMS 936	
Australia	1969	Festival	mono LP	AML-33,475	
Australia	1969	Festival	stereo LP	SAML-33,475	
Canada	1974	A&M Records	stereo 2-LP set with Dragonfly	SP9014	set entitled Early Strawbs
South Korea	2000	Si-Wan	CD	SRMC 0088	
	Unknown	Progressive Line	CD	PL 527	bootleg
United Kingdom	September 2008	A&M	CD	5302679	

== Reception ==
Professional ratings
Review scores
Source	Rating
Allmusic	3.5/5 stars
Encyclopedia of Popular Music	4/5 stars
Uncut	3/5 stars
