= Forever (Strawbs song) =

Single by Strawbs
- B-side: "Another Day"
- Released: July 1970
- Genre: Progressive folk
- Length: 3:32
- Label: A&M
- Songwriter(s): Dave Cousins, Tony Hooper
- Producer(s): Strawbs

Strawbs singles chronology
"The Man Who Called Himself Jesus" (1968)	"Forever" (1970)	"Benedictus" (1971)

"Forever" is a song by English band Strawbs written by Dave Cousins and Tony Hooper. It did not feature on any of their studio albums at the time but was included as a bonus track on the CD re-release of the albums Just a Collection of Antiques and Curios and Dragonfly.

== B-Side ==
The B-side track "Another Day" is taken from the Dragonfly album. The Italian release was paired with "Fingertips", a song from Just a Collection of Antiques and Curios.

== Personnel ==
- Dave Cousins – lead vocals, acoustic guitar
- Tony Hooper – backing vocals, acoustic guitar, percussion
- Ron Chesterman – double bass
- Rick Wakeman – organ
- Claire Deniz – cello
- Bjarne Rostvold – drums
- Tony Visconti – production
- Roger Quested – engineer

== Release history ==
Region	Date	Label	Format	Catalog	Comments
United Kingdom	July 1970	A&M	7" single	AMS791	
Italy	1971	A&M	7" single	AM 45009	B-side "Fingertips"
