= Heavy Disguise =

Song by Strawbs

from the album Grave New World
- Released: February 1972
- Recorded: November 1971
- Genre: Folk rock
- Length: 2:53
- Label: A&M
- Songwriter(s): John Ford
- Producer(s): Strawbs

"Heavy Disguise" is a song by English band Strawbs written by bassist John Ford. The track first appeared on the Grave New World album and features just John Ford from the band singing and accompanying himself on the acoustic guitar backed by "The Robert Kirby Silver Band" – i.e. a brass section arranged by Robert Kirby (who later became a Strawbs keyboard player).

Ford has said in interview that the song was inspired by the rhythm of a Jethro Tull song he heard on the radio. The lyrical content was inspired by him seeing a news report of a Vietnamese demonstration at the US embassy, but also draws heavily from the situation prevalent in Northern Ireland at the time (in the same way that "New World" does). The song was originally entitled "IRA Meeting Blues".

== Personnel ==
- John Ford – vocals, acoustic guitar

with

- The Robert Kirby Silver Band
