= Benedictus (Strawbs song) =

Single by Strawbs

from the album Grave New World
- B-side: "Keep the Devil Outside"
- Released: 1971
- Genre: Progressive folk, progressive rock
- Length: 4:24
- Label: A&M
- Songwriter(s): Dave Cousins
- Producer(s): Tony Visconti

Strawbs singles chronology
"Forever" (1970)	"Benedictus" (1971)	"Here It Comes" (1972)

Official audio
- "Benedictus" on YouTube

"Benedictus" is a song by English band Strawbs featured on their 1972 album Grave New World.

After the departure of Rick Wakeman, band leader Dave Cousins consulted the I Ching asking what to do next. The answer from the coins, "Humble must he constant be, where the paths of wisdom lead, distant is the shadow of the setting sun", forms part of the first two lines of the lyrics of the song.

Unusually for a rock song, the instrumental break is performed using a dulcimer played through a fuzz box. The resulting sound is often mistaken for an electric guitar.

== B-side ==
The B-side is a John Ford composition "Keep the Devil Outside", sung by Tony Hooper. The track was recorded at the same time as the album From the Witchwood and was originally released as the B-side of the single "Witchwood". This single was quickly withdrawn due to the band's dissatisfaction with the quality of the pressing.

== Other recordings ==
The song also makes an appearance on the 2001 Acoustic Strawbs album Baroque & Roll.

== Personnel ==
- Dave Cousins – lead vocals, electric dulcimer
- Tony Hooper – backing vocals, acoustic guitar
- John Ford – backing vocals, bass guitar
- Richard Hudson – backing vocals, drums
- Blue Weaver – Hammond organ, piano, Mellotron

with

- Trevor Lucas – backing vocals
- Anne Collins – backing vocals

== Release history ==
Region	Date	Label	Format	Catalog
United Kingdom	1971	A&M	stereo 7" single	AMS 874
United States		A&M	7" single	AMS1364
