= The Man Who Called Himself Jesus =

Single by Strawbs

from the album Strawbs
- B-side: "Poor Jimmy Wilson"
- Released: November 22, 1968
- Genre: Progressive folk
- Label: A&M
- Songwriter(s): Dave Cousins
- Producer(s): Gus Dudgeon

Strawbs singles chronology
"Oh How She Changed" (1968)	"The Man Who Called Himself Jesus" (1968)	"Forever" (1970)

Official audio
- "The Man Who Called Himself Jesus" on YouTube

"The Man Who Called Himself Jesus" is a song by English band Strawbs written by Dave Cousins. It appears on their first album Strawbs. An alternative mix of the song may be found on the 2006 box set A Taste of Strawbs.

== B-Side ==
The B-side track "Poor Jimmy Wilson" is also taken from the Strawbs album.

== Personnel ==
- Dave Cousins – lead vocals, acoustic guitar
- Tony Hooper – backing vocals, acoustic guitar, percussion
- Ron Chesterman – double bass

with

- Richard Wilson – spoken introduction

== Release history ==
Region	Date	Label	Format	Catalog	Comments
United Kingdom	November 22, 1968	A&M	7" single	AMS738	
Denmark	1968	Sonet	7" single	T 7257	
United States	1968	A&M	7" single	AM 998	
Australia		A&M	7" single	AMK-2719	
Argentina	1969	A&M	7" single	1068	
