= Dragonfly (Strawbs album) =

Studio album by Strawbs
- Released: February 1970
- Recorded: 1969
- Studio: Ivar Rosenberg Lydteknik, Copenhagen; Morgan Studios, London
- Genre: Folk rock
- Length: 36:44
- Label: A&M
- Producer: Tony Visconti

Strawbs chronology
Strawbs (1969)	Dragonfly (1970)	Just a Collection of Antiques and Curios (1971)

Professional ratings
Review scores
Source	Rating
Allmusic	3/5 stars
Uncut	4/5 stars
Encyclopedia of Popular Music	3/5 stars

Dragonfly is the second studio album by English band Strawbs. It contains the lengthy and rather progressive ballad "The Vision of the Lady of the Lake" describing the hardships of a boatman who encounters and battles a variety of mystical creatures on a lake, with a sword that was given to him by the lady of the lake. The album marked the first collaboration of Rick Wakeman with the band, though he only played on one song on this album, piano on The Vision of the Lady of the Lake; he eventually joined them on their next album, Just a Collection of Antiques and Curios, in 1970. Tony Visconti also played flute on two other songs.

== Track listing ==
All tracks are written by Dave Cousins, except where noted.

Side one
No.	Title	Length
1.	"The Weary Song"	3:50
2.	"Dragonfly"	5:34
3.	"I Turned My Face Into the Wind"	2:42
4.	"Josephine for Better or for Worse"	3:17
5.	"Another Day"	3:16

Side two
No.	Title	Writer(s)	Length
6.	"'Til the Sun Comes Shining Through"		3:34
7.	"Young Again"	Tony Hooper	2:51
8.	"The Vision of the Lady of the Lake"		10:44
9.	"Close Your Eyes"	Hooper	0:56

A&M re-release CD 5302680 bonus tracks
No.	Title	Writer(s)	Length
10.	"We'll Meet Again Some Time" (Recorded at Trident Studios, London, June 1969)		3:13
11.	"Forever" (single release)	Cousins, Hooper	3:32
12.	"Another Day" (recorded for John Peel's "Top Gear" BBC Radio 1 show, September 7, 1969)		3:03
13.	"We'll Meet Again Sometime" (recorded for John Peel's "Top Gear" BBC Radio 1 show, September 7, 1969)		3:09

== Personnel ==
Strawbs

- Dave Cousins – Vocals, acoustic guitar, dulcimer, Chinese piano, percussion
- Tony Hooper – Vocals, acoustic & electric euitars, tambourine, percussion
- Claire Deniz – Cello
- Ron Chesterman – Double bass

Additional personnel

- Tony Visconti – Recorder on "Dragonfly and "Young Again"
- Rick Wakeman – Piano on "The Vision of The Lady of the Lake"
- Paul Brett – Lead guitar on "The Vision of The Lady of the Lake"
- Bjarne Rostvold – Drums on "The Vision of The Lady of the Lake"

== Recording ==
Recorded at Rosenberg Lydteknik, Copenhagen with additional work at Morgan Studios, London. Mixed at Trident Studios, London

- Tony Visconti – Producer, engineer, Percussive effects
- Roger Quested – Engineer
- Roger Saunders - Design, Illustrations

== Release history ==
Region	Date	Label	Format	Catalogue	Comments
United Kingdom	February 1970	A&M	stereo LP	AMS 970	
Canada	1974	A&M	stereo 2-LP set with Strawbs	SP9014	set entitled Early Strawbs
South Korea	1999	Si-Wan	CD	SRMC 0083	
	Unknown	Progressive Line	CD	PL503	bootleg
United Kingdom	September 2008	A&M	CD	5302680	includes 4 bonus tracks
