= Ron Chesterman =

British bassist (1939–2007)

- Also known as: Ron Chesterman
- Born: Ronald George Arthur Chesterman; 27 November 1939
- Origin: Chester, Cheshire, England
- Died: 16 March 2007 (aged 67)
- Genres: Jazz; bluegrass; folk
- Occupation: Musician
- Instrument: Double bass
- Years active: 1963–2007
- Formerly of: Strawbs, Draught Porridge

Ronald George Arthur Chesterman (27 November 1939 – 16 March 2007) was an English musician. He is best known as the original double bass player with the Strawberry Hills Boys along with Dave Cousins on guitar, dulcimer, banjo and vocals and Tony Hooper on guitar and vocals. Formed in 1964, the band were renamed the Strawbs in June 1967 when they were giving a concert and needed to put the name of the band on the stage. Chesterman left the band in 1970 - they would go on to have hits with Lay Down and Part of the Union. In later years Chesterman became a county archivist in his home town of Chester.

He died on March 16, 2007.

== Discography ==
Steve Benbow

- Songs of Ireland (1966) - With David Cousins on banjo, Denny Wright on guitar, Jack Fallon on bass, Steve Benbow on guitar and vocals and the Strawberry Hills Boys : David Cousins, Tony Hooper and Ron Chesterman on backing vocals. Monitor MFS LP MFS 447 Label.

Tea & Symphony

- An Asylum for the Musically Insane (1969) - With Clem Clempson, Gus Dudgeon, etc. - Ron played double bass on Travelling Shoes.

Strawbs

- Singles :

- "Oh How She Changed/Or Am I Dreaming" (1968)
- "The Man Who Called Himself Jesus/Poor Jimmy Wilson" (1968)

- Studio albums :

- Strawbs (1969)
- Strawberry Sampler Number 1 (1969)
- Dragonfly (1970) - With Rick Wakeman on piano & Tony Visconti on recorder.
- Sandy Denny & The Strawbs : All Our Own Work (1973)

- Compilation albums :

- Early Strawbs (1974) - Double album
- Classic Strawbs (1977) - Double album
- Sandy Denny & The Strawbs (1991)
- Preserves Uncanned (1991)
- Halcyon Days 1997) - Double album
- Strawberry Sampler Number 1 (2001)
- The Collection (2002)
- Tears and Pavan (2002)
- The Witchwood Project (2006) Ron plays on one song, The happiest boy in town with The Strawberry Hill Boys.
- A taste of Strawbs (2006) 5-CD Box Set - Ron Double bass on 15 songs.
- Sandy Denny & The Strawbs : All our own work: CD - The Complete Sessions (2010) 2 CD
- Strawbs at The BBC - Volume 1 - In Session (2010)
- Of a time (2012) - With John Paul Jones, Nicky Hopkins, Tony Hooper, etc.
- Sandy Denny & The Strawbs : All our own work (2014) - 2 LP Vinyl Reissue Includes Original Album Release + Out-takes & Demos & Previously Unreleased Demos.
- Witchwood: The Very Best Of (2014)

Bernie Taupin

- Bernie Taupin (1970) - Shawn Phillips on guitar, sitar, koto and vocals.

Magna Carta

- Songs From Wasties Orchard (1971) - With Rick Wakeman, Nic Potter, Danny Thompson, Davey Johnstone, Chris Simpson, etc.

The Crown Folk

- More Folk in Worship (1974)
