= Tony Hooper =

British singer-songwriter (1939–2020)

- Born: Anthony Hooper; 14 September 1939; Eastry, Kent, England
- Died: 18 November 2020 (aged 81)
- Genres: Bluegrass; folk
- Occupations: Singer-songwriter; musician
- Instruments: Guitar; vocals
- Years active: 1960s–2020
- Formerly of: Strawbs; Misalliance; Pitchfork

Anthony Hooper (14 September 1939 – 18 November 2020) was an English folk singer-songwriter and musician. He was best known as a founder-member of Strawbs together with Dave Cousins and double bassist Ron Chesterman. He left The Strawbs in 1972 after their album Grave New World, when it became obvious that the band was moving further away from its folk roots towards rock and progressive rock. He rejoined for a 10-year stint in 1983. Hooper had been the guitarist in the Ceilidh and barn dance band, Pitchfork, since 1986, and was also a member of Misalliance.

Hooper died on 18 November 2020, at the age of 81.

== Discography ==
=== Albums ===
==== Strawbs ====
- All Our Own Work (with Sandy Denny) (Recorded in 1967 in Denmark but released in 1973)
- Strawbs (1969)
- Dragonfly (1970)
- Just a Collection of Antiques and Curios (1970)
- From the Witchwood (1971)
- Grave New World (1972)
- Don't Say Goodbye (1987)
- Ringing Down the Years (1991)
- Strawberry Sampler Number 1 (2001)

=== Singles ===
==== Strawbs ====
- "Oh How She Changed"
- "The Man Who Called Himself Jesus"
- "Benedictus"
- "Forever"
- "Here It Comes"
