= John Ford (musician) =

British musician (born 1948)

- Born: 1 July 1948 (age 78); Fulham, London, England
- Genres: Progressive rock; punk rock; pop rock; psychedelic; acoustic rock
- Occupation: Musician
- Instruments: Bass guitar; guitar; vocals
- Years active: 1960s–present
- Labels: A&M; EMI; Sony/ATV present: Whole Shot Records
- Formerly of: Strawbs; Hudson Ford; The Monks; Elmer Gantry's Velvet Opera; High Society
- Website: John Ford of the Strawbs on Facebook

John Ford (born 1 July 1948) is a British musician. He has toured and recorded with Velvet Opera, The Strawbs, Hudson/Ford and The Monks.

== Biography ==
Ford was born in the South West London district of Fulham and grew up in a household where his father played piano and his four sisters were singers. Ford went to a Church of England school, where church attendance was mandatory, and began singing there. When he was very young, his grandmother bought him a ukulele, then he got an Emenee toy Elvis Presley guitar and a guitar book; by the time he was 9, he had learned several chords. When he was 14, his father bought him a Höfner 500/1 bass, a guitar that was particularly popular at the time because it was used by Paul McCartney. Ford’s two idols were McCartney and Lonnie Donegan; Ford was most inspired by McCartney’s ‘popping’ bass on The Beatles’ "With a Little Help from My Friends" and used that same technique throughout his career.

In 1964, Ford joined with some school mates to form a band called Jaymes Fenda and the Vulcans. That November, they released two singles, "Mistletoe Love” and "The Only Girl", both of which were written by Ford. "Mistletoe Love" got some radio play through that Christmas season, but the band split up shortly afterwards.

In October 1966, Ford stepped in to replace the bass player of a South London R&B/soul band called the Five Proud Walkers, and made his debut when the band opened for Champion Jack Dupree. The Five Proud Walkers was a popular club band and played a constant stream of gigs in and around London. But, in the spring of 1967, they toured England with Pink Floyd and decided to make the shift to Psychedelic music. That July, they changed their name to Elmer Gantry’s Velvet Opera. The band released three albums and several singles but, in May 1970, Ford and drummer Richard Hudson left the band to join The Strawbs.

Ford's influence on the band, primarily known as a folk rock group, shifted them into a new direction in the progressive / art rock scene. Ford penned songs such as "Heavy Disguise" and "Part of the Union", Strawbs' biggest chart hit, whilst working with David Bowie/T. Rex producer Tony Visconti on A&M Records. Ford received an Ivor Novello Award for "Part of the Union".

Ford received three gold discs, and a platinum disc. A few years later, Ford and Richard Hudson formed Hudson Ford, signed to A&M, and released the UK Singles Chart hits "Pick Up The Pieces", "Burn Baby Burn" and "Floating in the Wind" and three albums - Nickelodeon, Free Spirit and Worlds Collide. They then moved to CBS Records for the Daylight album.

In 1979, Ford hit the charts again with The Monks, a punk project of sorts also picked up by EMI, with the surprise novelty double platinum hit, "Nice Legs Shame About the Face" from Bad Habits and "Suspended Animation". Ford also developed an alter ego in High Society with 1930s-style melodies, releasing a self-titled album in 1984. In 1986, Ford relocated to the U.S., and started working on his solo project and concerts.

Ford teamed up again with Strawbs for the 30 Year Reunion Tour in 1998, performing as bass guitarist and vocalist, after a hiatus since the late 1980s, and again for the 2001 Strawbs' UK Spring Tour. In between, in 1999, Ford played on Ritchie Blackmore's band Blackmore's Night release Under a Violet Moon, their second international release, which featured Ford on "Wind in the Willows". He also played some shows with the band.

In January 2004, Ford opened for Dave Mason at a Long Island concert venue, The Downtown which was located in Farmingdale, New York.

July 2004's Strawbs Summer UK Electric Tour, featured Ford on bass and vocals with the original UK electric line up from the 1970s. Some of his live performances can be viewed on DVD, on Strawbs Live in Tokyo and The Complete Strawbs – Live at Chiswick House.

March 2006, Ford returned to UK for another Strawbs Electric Tour filmed and recorded for Lay Down with The Strawbs DVD/CD, featuring John Ford leading on "Part of the Union".

In September 2009, John Ford joined Strawbs for their 40th Anniversary Weekend at Twickenham Rugby Stadium, London, which included keyboardist Rick Wakeman. The Live CD release for the event, Strawbs 40th Anniversary Celebration Vol. 1: Strawberry Fayre released in 2010, features John Ford on two of his songs, "Together Apart" and "Floating in the Wind".

Ford appears on Lay Down with the Strawbs the 2006 Strawbs UK Electric Tour features John Ford on "Kissed by the Sun", "Heavy Disguise" and "Part of the Union".

April 2011 marked the release of John Ford's latest album, Resurrected – The Best of and Then Some, a chronological collection of some of Ford's solo material, in addition to five newly recorded songs.

2012 brought Ford, as founding member of The Monks, a Double Platinum Record Award from EMI for Bad Habits whilst in Toronto, Canada in July, for a special Monks BAD HABITS Tribute show at the well-known Horseshoe Tavern. The Monks' Tribute show featured numerous members of top Canadian bands – including Sloan, The Grapes of Wrath, The New Pornographers, C'mon, Cursed, and Small Sins – with Thomas D'Arcy at the helm, producing the tribute show. D'Arcy also put together the Bad Habits tribute album, on which Ford is featured. Plans are under way for Bad Habits going the route of Green Day's American Idiot stage musical as a one-act, British punk rock opera production.

John Ford recently completed two new Halloween songs – "Halloween – I'm The Nightmare in Your Dreams Club Mix" for the Space Drama pop, electronica dance project with, and rocking, "Halloween – There's A Party Going On" with Ian Lloyd of Stories, for the Ford-Lloyd project. Ian Lloyd is best known as lead singer for No. 1 hit "Brother Louie" and founding member of Stories band. Lloyd sings the theme song for Louis C.K.'s comedy on FX – Louie.

== Discography ==
Jaymes Fenda and the Vulcans

- "Mistletoe Love" / "The Only Girl" (1964), Parlophone Records
- Ready Steady - Win! (1964, compilation), Decca Records

Elmer Gantry's Velvet Opera

- Elmer Gantry's Velvet Opera (1968), Direction Records
- Ride a Hustler's Dream (1969), See For Miles Records
- The Very Best Of (1996, compilation), See for Miles Records

Singles:

- "Flames" / "Salisbury Plain" (1967)
- "Flames" / "What's The Point of Leaving" (1967)
- "Mary Jane" / "Dreamy" (1968)
- "Volcano" / "A Quick B" (1969)
- "Anna Dance Square" / "Don't You Realise" (1969)
- "Black Jack Davy" / "Statesboro Blues" (1970)
- "She Keeps Giving Me These Feelings" / "There's a Hole in My Pocket" (1970)

Strawbs

- Just a Collection of Antiques and Curios (1970), A&M Records
- Witchwood (1971, EP), A&M
- From the Witchwood (1971), A&M
- Grave New World (1972, also co-producer), A&M
- Bursting at the Seams (1973), A&M
- Stereo Pop Special-40 (1973), BBC Transcription Services
- Strawbs & Dave Cousins (1973, compilation), A&M
- Strawbs By Choice (1974, compilation), A&M
- Classic Strawbs (1977, compilation), A&M
- The Best of Strawbs (1978, compilation), A&M
- A Choice Selection Of Strawbs (1992, compilation), A&M
- Halcyon Days (The Very Best Of The Strawbs) (1997, compilation), A&M
- 30 Years In Rock (2001, compilation), Classic Rock Society
- Tears And Pavan - An Introduction To Strawbs (2002, compilation), A&M
- The Collection (2002, compilation), Spectrum Music
- The Best Of Strawbs (2003, compilation), A&M
- A Taste Of Strawbs (2006, compilation), Witchwood Media
- Strawbs 40th Anniversary Celebration Vol. 1: Strawberry Fayre (2010), Witchwood Media
- Witchwood: The Very Best Of (2014, compilation), Spectrum Music
- Settlement (2021)
- The Magic Of It All (2023)

Singles:

- "Forever" / "Another Day" (1970)
- "Where is This Dream of Your Youth" / "Fingertips" (1970)
- "Forever" / "Fingertips" (1971)
- "Thirty Days" / "Witchwood" (1971)
- "Benedictus" / "Keep the Devil Outside" (1971)
- "Heavy Disguise" / "Benedictus" (1972)
- "Keep the Devil Outside" / "Tomorrow" (1972)
- "Witchwood" / "A Glimpse Of Heaven" (1972)
- "New World" / "Benedictus" (1972)
- "Here It Comes" / "Tomorrow" (1972)
- "Going Home" / "Ways and Means" (1972)
- "Lay Down" / "Backside" (1972)
- "Shine On Silver Sun" / "And Wherefore" (1973)
- "Part of the Union" / "Will You Go" (1973)
- "Tiendete" / "Mañana" (1973)

Hudson-Ford

- Nickelodeon (1973), A&M
- Free Spirit (1974), A&M
- Worlds Collide (1975), A&M
- Daylight (1977) CBS Records
- The A&M Albums (2017, Box Set) Caroline International

Singles:

- "Pick Up the Pieces" / "This Is Not The Way (To End A War Or To Die)" (1973)
- "Take it Back" / "Make No Mistake" (1973)
- "Burn Baby Burn" / "Angels" (1974)
- "Floating in the Wind" / "Revelations" (1974)
- "Free Spirit" / "Floating In The Wind" (1974)
- "Free Spirit" / "Dark Lord" (1974)
- "When Love Has Overgrown" / What is a Day Without Love" (1975)
- "Waterfall" / "Daylight" (1976)
- "95 In The Shade" / "Lost In A World" (1976)
- "Sold on Love" / "Daylight" (1976)
- "Are You Dancing" / "Out Of Your Shadow" (1977)
- "Kiss In The Dark" / "Simple Man" (1977)
- "Poor Boy / "Simple Man" (1978)
- "Just Say No" / "GB Jig" (2001)

The Monks

- Bad Habits (1979) EMI
- Suspended Animation (1980)

Singles:

- "Nice Legs Shame About the Face" / "You'll Be the Death of Me" (1979)
- "I Ain't Gettin Any" / "Inter-City Kitty" (1979)
- "Johnny B. Rotten" / "Drugs in My Pocket" (1979)
- ""Drugs in My Pocket" / "Love In Stereo" (1979)
- "Don't Want No Reds" / Suspended Animation" (1980)
- "I Can Do Anything You Like" / "Monks Medley" (1981)
- "Cool Way To Live" / "King Dong" (1981)

High Society

- High Society (1984, re-released 1997, 2003 & 2009)

Singles:

- "I Never Go Out in the Rain" / "I Could Never Live Without You" (1980)
- "Gotta Get Out of This Rut" / "Powder Blue" (1981)

Ford-Lloyd

- "Halloween – There's A Party Going On" (2012)
- "Halloween – I'm The Nightmare in Your Dreams" (2012)

Solo

- Love is a Highway (1998), Whole Shot Records
- Heading for a High (2000), Whole Shot Records
- Natural High (2002), Whole Shot Records
- Backtracking (2004, compilation), Whole Shot Records
- Whatever Happened to Christmas? (2005), Whole Shot Records
- New World EP (2005), Whole Shot Records
- A Christmas Trilogy (2006), Whole Shot Records
- Big Hit in India (2008), Whole Shot Records
- Resurrected – The Best of and Then Some (2010), Whole Shot Records
- No Talkin' (2014), Whole Shot Records
- A Better Day (2015), Whole Shot Records
- Life in a Foreign Town (2021), Whole Shot Records

Singles:

- "It's Alright, Bill" / "Captain Of Your Ship" (1973)

Compilation inclusions

- The Fox Lies Down: A Tribute To Genesis – track: Carpet Crawlers (Cleopatra Records/Purple Pyramid 1998)
- Progressive Rock Epics – track: Carpet Crawlers (St. Clair Entertainment Group 2001)
- ROCK 4 XMAS All Stars Compilation – track: White Christmas (ROCK 4 XMAS 2005)
