= Rick Wakeman discography =

Rick Wakeman is an English keyboardist, composer and songwriter, most known as the keyboard player for progressive rock group Yes. His solo albums have sold over 50 million copies.

== Solo ==
=== Albums ===
==== 1970s ====
| Title | Album details | Peak chart positions | | | | | | Certifications |
| Title | Album details | CAN | US | AUS | NZ | NOR | UK | Certifications |
|---|---|---|---|---|---|---|---|---|
| Piano Vibrations | Released: 1971; Label: Polydor | — | — | — | — | — | — | |
| The Six Wives of Henry VIII | Released: January 23, 1973; Label: A&M | 27 | 30 | 9 | 21 | — | 7 | AUS: Gold; US: Gold |
| Journey to the Centre of the Earth | Released: May 3, 1974; Label: A&M | 2 | 3 | 2 | 17 | — | 1 | AUS: Gold; BRA: Gold; CAN: Gold; UK: Gold; US: Gold |
| The Myths and Legends of King Arthur and the Knights of the Round Table | Released: March 27, 1975; Label: A&M | 18 | 21 | 2 | 1 | 6 | 2 | AUS: Gold; BRA: Gold; UK: Gold |
| Lisztomania | Released: October 1975; Label: A&M | — | 145 | 85 | — | — | — | |
| No Earthly Connection | Released: April 1976; Label: A&M | 74 | 67 | 35 | — | 15 | 9 | |
| White Rock | Released: January 1977; Label: A&M | 69 | 126 | 38 | — | 12 | 14 | UK: Silver |
| Rick Wakeman's Criminal Record | Released: November 1977; Label: A&M | — | 128 | 76 | — | 19 | 25 | |
| Rhapsodies | Released: May 1979; Label: A&M | — | 170 | — | — | 15 | 25 | |
"—" denotes releases that did not chart or were not released in that territory.

==== 1980s ====
| Year | Album | Notes | Peak chart positions | | | |
| Year | Album | Notes | UK | US | AUS | NOR |
|---|---|---|---|---|---|---|
| 1981 | The Burning (soundtrack) | | — | — | — | — |
| 1981 | 1984 | | 24 | — | 10 | 36 |
| 1982 | Rock 'n' Roll Prophet | | — | — | — | — |
| 1983 | Cost of Living | | — | — | — | — |
| 1983 | G'olé!: The Original Film Soundtrack | | — | — | — | — |
| 1984 | Crimes of Passion | | — | — | — | — |
| 1985 | Silent Nights | | — | — | — | — |
| 1985 | Live at Hammersmith | Recorded in 1985 | — | — | — | — |
| 1986 | Country Airs | Re-recorded with a digital piano in 1992 with additional tracks | — | — | — | — |
| 1987 | The Family Album | | — | — | — | — |
| 1987 | The Gospels | | 94 | — | — | — |
| 1988 | Time Machine | | — | — | — | — |
| 1988 | A Suite of Gods (with Ramon Remedios) | | — | — | — | — |
| 1988 | Zodiaque (with Tony Fernandez) | | — | — | — | — |
| 1988 | The Word and the Gospels | | — | — | — | — |
| 1989 | Black Knights at the Court of Ferdinand IV (with Mario Fasciano) | | — | — | — | — |
| 1989 | Sea Airs | | — | — | — | — |
"—" denotes releases that did not chart or were not released in that territory.

==== 1990s ====
| Year | Album | Notes | Peak chart positions | | Certifications |
| Year | Album | Notes | UK | US | Certifications |
|---|---|---|---|---|---|
| 1990 | Night Airs | | — | — | |
| 1990 | In the Beginning | | — | — | |
| 1991 | Phantom Power | Re-released in 2017 in an expanded edition titled Phantom of the Opera | — | — | |
| 1991 | Rock 'n' Roll Prophet Plus | Reissue of Rock 'n' Roll Prophet plus 4 new tracks | — | — | |
| 1991 | Aspirant Sunrise | | — | — | |
| 1991 | Aspirant Sunset | | — | — | |
| 1991 | Aspirant Sunshadows | | — | — | |
| 1991 | The Classical Connection | Re-recordings of earlier tracks in a classical style | — | — | |
| 1991 | African Bach | | — | — | |
| 1991 | 2000 A.D. Into The Future | | — | — | |
| 1991 | Softsword: King John and the Magna Charter | Adapted from music written for the 1991 Dickens Festival | — | — | |
| 1993 | Heritage Suite | | — | — | |
| 1993 | Prayers | | — | — | |
| 1993 | Classic Tracks | Re-recorded tracks from the first three solo albums | — | — | |
| 1993 | The Classical Connection 2 | | — | — | |
| 1993 | Unleashing the Tethered One: The 1974 North American Tour | Unauthorised bootleg of a Canadian television broadcast from October 1974 | — | — | |
| 1993 | Rick Wakeman's Greatest Hits | Re-recorded tracks from his solo albums and Yes | — | — | |
| 1994 | Live on the Test | Recorded in April 1976 | — | — | |
| 1994 | Light Up the Sky (EP) | | — | — | |
| 1995 | Almost Live in Europe | | — | — | |
| 1995 | The Piano Album | Recorded in 1994 | — | — | |
| 1995 | The Private Collection | Previously unreleased tracks | — | — | |
| 1995 | The Seven Wonders of the World | | — | — | |
| 1995 | Rick Wakeman In Concert | Recorded in November 1975, also released as Live on The King Biscuit Flower Hour | — | — | |
| 1995 | Visions | Also known as Visions of Paradise | — | — | |
| 1995 | Cirque Surreal | | — | — | |
| 1996 | Fields of Green | | — | — | |
| 1996 | The New Gospels | | — | — | |
| 1996 | The Word and Music | | — | — | |
| 1996 | Can You Hear Me? | Contains original and remixed and re-recorded versions of tracks from Prayers and Softsword | — | — | |
| 1996 | Orisons | 9 of the 22 tracks are duplicates of tracks of Prayers | — | — | |
| 1997 | Tribute | Beatles covers | — | — | |
| 1997 | Simply Acoustic | The Piano Album (1995) with added introductions and stories | — | — | |
| 1997 | Fields Of Green '97 | Reissue with the addition of "Election 97/Arthur" | — | — | |
| 1998 | Themes | Compilation of TV themes | — | — | |
| 1999 | Return to the Centre of the Earth | | 34 | — | |
| 1999 | White Rock II | | — | — | |
| 1999 | The Natural World Trilogy | | — | — | |
| 1999 | Art in Music Trilogy | | — | — | |
"—" denotes releases that did not chart or were not released in that territory.

==== 2000s ====
| Year | Album | Peak chart positions | | Notes |
| Year | Album | UK | US | Notes |
|---|---|---|---|---|
| 2000 | Preludes to a Century | — | — | |
| 2000 | Chronicles of Man | — | — | |
| 2000 | Christmas Variations | — | — | |
| 2000 | The Legend: Live in Concert 2000 | — | — | |
| 2000 | Morning Has Broken | — | — | |
| 2001 | Out of the Blue | — | — | Recorded in Buenos Aires in 2001 |
| 2001 | Classical Variations | — | — | |
| 2001 | Tales of Future and Past | — | — | US 2 CD compilation |
| 2001 | Two Sides of Yes | — | — | Interpretations of 7 Yes songs |
| 2002 | The Wizard and the Forest of All Dreams | — | — | |
| 2002 | Treasure Chest (8-CD boxset) | — | — | The Real Lisztomania; The Oscar Concert; The Missing Half; Almost Classical; The Mixture; Medium Rare; Journey to the Centre of the Earth Plus; Stories |
| 2002 | Two Sides of Yes Volume 2 | — | — | |
| 2002 | The Yes Piano Variations | — | — | Compilation of tracks from the Two Sides Of Yes albums |
| 2003 | Out There | — | — | |
| 2005 | At Lincoln Cathedral | — | — | |
| 2006 | Retro | — | — | |
| 2007 | Live at the BBC | — | — | |
| 2007 | Retro 2 | — | — | |
| 2007 | Video Vault (6-DVD set) | — | — | Live at the Empire Pool: King Arthur on Ice 1975; Live at the Maltings 1976; Live Swedish Television Special 1980; Live at the Hammersmith Odeon 1981; Night Music; Rarities |
| 2009 | The Six Wives of Henry VIII: Live at Hampton Court Palace | — | — | |
| 2009 | Past, Present and Future | | — | — |
"—" denotes releases that did not chart or were not released in that territory.

==== 2010s ====
| Year | Album | Notes | Peak chart positions | | Certifications |
| Year | Album | Notes | UK | US | Certifications |
|---|---|---|---|---|---|
| 2010 | Always with You | | — | — | |
| 2012 | In the Nick of Time: Live in 2003 | | — | — | |
| 2012 | Journey to the Centre of the Earth | Re-recording with additional material | — | — | |
| 2016 | The Myths and Legends of King Arthur and the Knights of the Round Table | Re-recording with additional material | — | — | |
| 2017 | Piano Portraits | | 6 | — | UK: Silver |
| 2018 | Piano Odyssey | | 7 | — | |
| 2019 | Christmas Portraits | | 82 | — | |
| 2019 | Official Bootleg Series 1–11 | | | | |
"—" denotes releases that did not chart or were not released in that territory.

==== 2020s ====
| Year | Album | Peak chart positions | |
| Year | Album | UK | US |
|---|---|---|---|
| 2020 | The Red Planet | 34 | — |
| 2020 | Hero: The Original Soundtrack | — | — |
| 2022 | A Gallery of the Imagination | — | — |
| 2022 | Live from Elche | — | — |
| 2024 | Live at the London Palladium 2023 | — | — |
| 2025 | Melancholia | — | — |
| 2026 | Return to the Red Planet | — | — |
"—" denotes releases that did not chart or were not released in that territory.

=== Non-album singles ===
Note: These are singles that were not taken from a regular album. These songs were only released in these singles or were included on future compilations.

- 1985: "Lytton's Diary" (for a TV series of the same name)
- 1994: "Light Up the Sky"

=== Compilations ===
- 1997 Voyage (sub-titled "The Very Best of Rick Wakeman"; digitally remastered 2-CD set)
- 1999 The Masters: compilation of tracks from 1979 to 1996
- 2000 Recollections: The Very Best of Rick Wakeman 1973-1979
- 2002 Songs of Middle Earth (Inspired by The Lord of the Rings)
- 2004 Revisited (re-recordings of past material)
- 2015 After the Ball: The Collection (same tracks as Recollections)
- 2017 The Journey: The Essential Rick Wakeman: Spectrum 3CD compilation from the A&M years. The 3rd CD features all of Lisztomania and White Rock.

=== Video games ===
- 1993 Microcosm

== With band or duo ==
=== With Strawbs ===
Live albums
- Just a Collection of Antiques and Curios (1970)
- Recollection (2006)
- Live at the BBC, Vol Two: In Concert (2010)

Studio albums

- Dragonfly (1970, "The Vision of the Lady of the Lake")
- From the Witchwood (1971)

Compilations

- Strawbs by Choice (1974)
- A Choice Selection of Strawbs (1992)
- Halcyon Days (1997)
- The Collection (2002)
- Tears and Pavan (2002)
- A Taste of Strawbs (2006)

=== With Yes ===
Studio albums

- Fragile (1971)
- Close to the Edge (1972)
- Tales from Topographic Oceans (1973)
- Going for the One (1977)
- Tormato (1978)
- Union (1991)
- Keys to Ascension (1996)
- Keys to Ascension 2 (1997)

Live albums

- Yessongs (1973)
- Yesshows (1980)
- Keys to Ascension (1996)
- Keys to Ascension 2 (1997)
- The Word Is Live (2005)
- Live at Montreux 2003 (2007)
- Progeny: Seven Shows from Seventy-Two (2015)
- Progeny: Highlights from Seventy-Two (2015)

Compilations

- Yesterdays (1975)
- Classic Yes (1981)
- Yesyears (1991)
- Yesstory (1992)
- Highlights: The Very Best of Yes (1993)
- Keystudio (2001)
- In a Word: Yes (1969 - ) (2002)
- The Ultimate Yes: 35th Anniversary Collection (2003)
- Essentially Yes (2006)

=== With Dave Cousins ===
- Two Weeks Last Summer (1972)
- Hummingbird (2002)
- Wakeman & Cousins Live (2005)
- 40th Anniversary Celebration Vol. 2: Rick Wakeman and Dave Cousins (2010)

=== With Anderson Bruford Wakeman Howe ===
Studio albums

- Anderson Bruford Wakeman Howe (1989)

Live albums

- An Evening of Yes Music Plus (1993)
- Live at the NEC Oct 24th 1989 (2010)

=== With Adam Wakeman/Wakeman with Wakeman ===
Studio albums

- Wakeman with Wakeman (1993; also known as Lure of the Wild)
- No Expense Spared (1993)
- Romance of the Victorian Age (1995)
- Tapestries (1996)
- Vignettes (1996)

Live albums

- Wakeman with Wakeman: The Official Bootleg (1994; also known as Wakeman with Wakeman Live, The Stage Collection, and Official Live Bootleg)

=== With Anderson/Wakeman ===
Studio albums

- The Living Tree (2010)

Live albums

- The Living Tree in Concert Part One (2011)

=== With Yes Featuring Jon Anderson, Trevor Rabin, Rick Wakeman ===
- Live at the Apollo (2018)

== Other collaborations ==
- Beyond the Planets (1984, with Jeff Wayne and Kevin Peek)
- Creepshow 2 (1987, with Les Reed)
- From Brush and Stone (2009, with Gordon Giltrap)
- Starmus (2014, with Brian May)

== Guest appearances ==
- Junior's Eyes – Battersea Power Station (1969)
- Paper Bubble – Scenery (1969)
- David Bowie – Space Oddity (1969, "Space Oddity", "Wild Eyed Boy from Freecloud")
- Heatwave – "Rastus Ravel (Is a Mean Old Man)" (1970)
- Magna Carta – Seasons (1970)
- Magna Carta – Songs from Wasties Orchard (1971, "Time for the Leaving")
- Colin Scot – Colin Scot (1971)
- John Schroeder – Dylan Vibrations (1971)
- David Bowie – Hunky Dory (1971)
- Elton John – Madman Across the Water (1971)
- John Williams and Stanley Myers & Orchestra – Changes (1971)
- Ralph McTell – You Well-Meaning Brought Me Here (1971)
- John Kongos – Kongos (1971)
- Cat Stevens – Teaser and the Firecat (1971, "Morning Has Broken")
- T. Rex – Electric Warrior (1971, "Bang a Gong (Get It On)")
- Lou Reed – Lou Reed (1972)
- Phillip Goodhand-Tait – Songfall (1972)
- Harvey Andrews – Writer of Songs (1972)
- Dave Cousins – Two Weeks Last Summer (1972)
- Joël Daydé – White Soul (1972)
- David Bowie – The Rise and Fall of Ziggy Stardust and the Spiders from Mars (1972, "It Ain't Easy")
- Al Stewart – Orange (1972)
- Hudson Ford – Nickelodeon (1973)
- Black Sabbath – Sabbath Bloody Sabbath (1973, "Sabbra Cadabra")
- Al Stewart – Past, Present and Future (1974)
- Dana Gillespie – Weren't Born a Man (1974)
- The Strawbs – Nomadness (1975)
- Vivian Stanshall – Teddy Boys Don't Knit (1981, ""Smoke Signals at Night")
- Kenny Lynch – "Half the Day's Gone and We Haven't Earned a Penny" (1983, "They Don't Know You" and "B. A. Woman")
- David Bowie – Absolute Beginners (1986)
- Denny Laine – Wings on My Feet (1987)
- Aleksander Mežek – Podarjeno Srcu (1989)
- Simon Cummings – "Everybody's Got a Crisis in Their Life" (1990)
- Ozzy Osbourne – Ozzmosis (1995, "Perry Mason" and "I Just Want You")
- Clive Nolan & Oliver Wakeman – Jabberwocky (1999)
- Gordon Giltrap – Music for the Small Screen (2000)
- Dr. Feelgood – Chess Masters (2000)
- Various Artists – Wonderous: A Tribute to Yes (2001)
- Various Artists – Slade Remade (2001)
- The Bollenberg Experience – If Only Stones Could Speak (2002)
- Damian Wilson & Band – Live in Rehearsal (2002)
- Ric Sanders Group – In Lincoln Cathedral (2002)
- Various Artists – Return to the Dark Side of the Moon (A Tribute to Pink Floyd) (2005)
- Cousins and Conrad – High Seas (2005, "Deep in the Darkest Night")
- Elkie Brooks – Pearls (2006)
- Elkie Brooks – Live With Friends (2006)
- Gordon Giltrap – Gordon Giltrap and Friends at the Symphony Hall Birmingham (2006)
- Mario Fasciano – Porta San Gennaro Napoli (2007)
- Various Artists – The Ultimate Tribute to Led Zeppelin (2008)
- Mitch Benn – Sing Like an Angel (2008)
- Various Artists – The Music of Pink Floyd (2009)
- Various Artists – Who Are You: An All Star Tribute to The Who (2012)
- The Fusion Syndicate – The Fusion Syndicate (2012)
- Etta James – Live at Montreux 1993 (2012)
- Various Artists – The Prog Collective (2012, "Check Point Karma")
- Various Artists – Songs of the Century: An All-Star Tribute to Supertramp (2012, "Crime of the Century")
- Nektar – A Spoonful of Time (2012)
- Various Artists – Fly Like an Eagle an All-Star Tribute to Steve Miller Band (2013)
- The Prog Collective – Epilogue (2013)
- Sarastro Blake – New Progmantics (2013)
- Days Between Stations – In Extremis (2013)
- Ayreon – The Theory of Everything (album) (2013)
- Various Artists – Light My Fire: A Classic Rock Salute to The Doors (2014)
- Various Artists – Celebrating Jon Lord: The Rock Legend (2014)
- Deep Purple and Friends With the Orion Orchestra – Celebrating Jon Lord (2014)
- The Strawbs – Prognostic (2014)
- Nik Turner – Space Fusion Odyssey (2015)
- Tucker Zimmerman – Ten Songs (2015)
- Billy Sherwood – Citizen (2015, "The Great Depression")
- Jerry Goodman – Violin Fantasy (2016)
- Graham Bonnet – Back Row in the Stalls (2016)
- Various Artists – Pink Floyd's Wish You Were Here Symphonic (2016)
- Leon Alvarado – The Future Left Behind (2016, "Launch Overture")
- Michael Ball & Alfie Boe with The Rays of Sunshine Children's Choir & Friends – "Bring Me Sunshine"
- Derek Smalls – Smalls Change (Meditations Upon Ageing) (2018)
- William Shatner – Shatner Claus: The Christmas Album (2018)
- Rodney Matthews and Jeff Scheetz with Oliver Wakeman – Trinity (2019)
- Kilty Town – Kilty Town (2019)
- Wally – Martyrs and Cowboys (2019)
- Hawkestrel – SpaceXmas (2020)
- Jools Holland – Pianola, Piano & Friends (2021)
- Various Artists – A Tribute to Pink Floyd – Still Wish You Were Here (2021, "Welcome to the Machine")
