= Classic Tracks =

Classic Tracks may refer to:

- Classic Tracks (The Cars album)
- Classic Tracks (Rick Wakeman album), 1993
