= Phantom Power (disambiguation) =

Phantom power is a method of sending DC electrical voltage through microphone cables.

Phantom power may also refer to:

- Standby power, power consumed by any device while it is switched off.
- Phantom Power (Rick Wakeman album), a 1990 album
- Phantom Power (The Tragically Hip album), a 1998 album
- Phantom Power (Super Furry Animals album), a 2003 album
- Phantom Power & Ludicrous Speed (Pierce the Veil song), a song from 2016 album Misadventures
