= GasTank =

English television show (1983)

- Directed by: Gerry Hill
- Presented by: Rick Wakeman; Tony Ashton
- Country of origin: England
- No. of seasons: 1
- No. of episodes: 6

Production
- Producers: Paul Knight; Ralph Tobert
- Running time: 60 minutes (with commercials)

Original release
- Network: Channel 4
- Release: January 15 – March 26, 1983

GasTank was a British music television show that ran for six episodes from January to March 1983 on Channel 4. Hosted by keyboardists Rick Wakeman and Tony Ashton, the show featured interviews with musicians where the guest artist joined Wakeman and his house band in playing re-arranged versions of their classic songs or entirely new pieces created for the show. The format was informal with the setting likened to a bar, where Wakeman would interview the guest over a drink, followed by their performance, in front of a small studio audience, sitting in groups at tables.

The house band featured Wakeman (keyboards), Ashton (keyboards and vocals), Chas Cronk (bass, episodes 1–3, 5, 6), Jerome Rimson (bass, episodes 1–4), and Tony Fernandez (drums).

In 2020, all episodes were made available on YouTube.

== Episodes ==
=== Episode 1 ===
Guests

- Rick Parfitt
- The Cimarons
- Eric Burdon & Alvin Lee

Music

- Rick Parfitt: Little Lady
- Rick Parfitt: Rain
- Rick Wakeman: Catherine Howard
- The Cimarons: He Give Up To I
- Tony Ashton: Cigarettes!
- Eric Burdon & Alvin Lee: Heart Attack
- Eric Burdon & Alvin Lee: Trying To Get Back To You
- Eric Burdon & Alvin Lee: Rock and Roll Medley

Interviews

- Rick Parfitt
- Eric Burdon

=== Episode 2 ===
Guests

- Andy Fairweather Low
- Kevin Godley & Lol Creme
- Ronnie Scott
- Maggie Bell

Music

- Tony Ashton: Aeroplane
- Andy Fairweather Low: Man Smart, Woman Smarter
- Andy Fairweather Low, Kevin Godley & Lol Creme: Wide Eyed and Legless, In the Midnight Hour
- Ronnie Scott: Gerrard Street
- Rick Wakeman: Catherine Parr
- Maggie Bell: Blackpool's First Twist Victim
- Maggie Bell: Crazy

Interviews

- Kevin Godley & Lol Creme
- Andy Fairweather Low
- Ronnie Scott

=== Episode 3 ===
Guests

- Phil Lynott & John Sykes
- Donovan
- Chris Farlowe & Alvin Lee
- Rick Parfitt
- Ian Paice

Music

- Tony Ashton: TV Set
- Phil Lynott & John Sykes: Growing Up
- Phil Lynott & John Sykes: The Man's A Fool
- Rick Wakeman & Tony Ashton: Keyboard Ad-lib
- Donovan: Mellow Yellow
- Donovan: Lalena
- Chris Farlowe & Alvin Lee: Staring Outta Windows
- Chris Farlowe & Alvin Lee: Stormy Monday Blues
- Chris Farlowe, Alvin Lee, Rick Parfitt, Ian Paice: Lucille

Interviews

- Chris Farlowe

=== Episode 4 ===
Guests

- Steve Harley
- The Strawbs
- John Entwistle
- Rick Parfitt
- Ian Paice

Music

- Steve Harley: Mr. Soft
- The Strawbs: The Hangman and the Papist
- John Entwistle: Twist and Shout
- Rick Wakeman: Elgin Mansions
- Tony Ashton: It's Weird
- John Entwistle & Steve Harley: Go America

Interviews

- Steve Harley
- Dave Cousins (The Strawbs)
- John Entwistle

=== Episode 5 ===
Guests

- Alvin Lee
- Ian Paice
- Howie Casey
- Suzi Quatro
- Steve Hackett

Music

- Alvin Lee: I May Be Wrong
- Alvin Lee: Tell Me Baby
- Ian Paice & Howie Casey: Resurrection Shuffle
- Ian Paice & Howie Casey: Possibly
- Suzi Quatro & Steve Hackett: My Babe
- Suzi Quatro & Steve Hackett: CC Rider
- Suzi Quatro & Steve Hackett: Sweet Little Rock 'n' Roller

Interviews

- Alvin Lee
- Ian Paice
- Suzi Quatro

=== Episode 6 ===
Guests

- Roy Wood
- Frankie Miller
- Howie Casey
- The Cimarons
- Steve Hackett

Music

- Roy Wood: California Man
- Roy Wood: Down To Zero
- Rick Wakeman: Gone But Not Forgotten
- Frankie Miller & Howie Casey: He'll Have to Go
- The Cimarons: My Soul Wants To Be With Jah
- Steve Hackett: Camino Royale (Hackett to Pieces)
- Steve Hackett: Hackett's Boogie

Interviews

- Roy Wood
- Steve Hackett
