= Out There (Rick Wakeman album) =

Studio album by Rick Wakeman and the New English Rock Ensemble
- Released: 2003
- Recorded: 2000–03
- Genre: Progressive rock
- Length: 58.04 (US reissue)
- Label: Music Fusion; AAO Music (US)
- Producer: Rick Wakeman

Rick Wakeman and the New English Rock Ensemble chronology
| The Wizard and the Forest of All Dreams (2002) | Out There (2003) | Rick Wakeman at Lincoln Cathedral (2004) |

Alternative cover

Out There is a progressive rock album released in 2003 by former Yes keyboardist Rick Wakeman. The album features a new version of The English Rock Ensemble.

== Track listing ==
1. "Out There"
2. "The Mission"
3. "To Be with You"
4. "Universe of Sound"
5. "Music of Love"
6. "The Cathedral of the Sky"

US reissue bonus tracks

7. "To Be with You (single edit)"
8. "The Mission (single edit)"
9. "Music of Love (single edit)"

== Personnel ==
The English Rock Ensemble:

- Rick Wakeman - Keyboards
- Tony Fernandez - Electronic and Acoustic Drums and Percussion
- Ant Glynne - Electric Guitars
- Damian Wilson - Vocals
- Lee Pomeroy - Basses

(additional solo guitar on "The Mission" and acoustic guitar on "Out There" by Fraser Thorneycroft-Smith)

English Chamber Choir - choir

Guy Protheroe - conductor

== Trivia ==
- The album is dedicated to the astronauts who gave their lives on the Columbia space mission.
- The cover was designed by Italian artist Alina Bencini, who was Wakeman's girlfriend at the time.
