= 1984 (Rick Wakeman album) =

Studio album by Rick Wakeman
- Released: 19 June 1981
- Recorded: 23 February–14 April 1981
- Studio: Morgan, London
- Genre: Progressive rock
- Length: 45:36
- Label: Charisma
- Producer: Rick Wakeman

Rick Wakeman chronology
The Burning (1981)	1984 (1981)	Rock 'n' Roll Prophet (1982)

Singles from 1984
- 1. "Julia" Released: July 1981; 2. "Robot Man" Released: November 1981

Professional ratings
Review scores
Source	Rating
AllMusic	4/5 stars

1984 is a studio album by the English keyboardist Rick Wakeman, released in June 1981 on Charisma Records. After reforming his band The English Rock Ensemble in 1980 and completing a European tour, Wakeman entered a recording deal with Charisma and began preparing material for a studio album. He decided on a concept album based on the dystopian novel Nineteen Eighty-Four by George Orwell. The lyrics are by Tim Rice.

The album received a warm reception, and peaked at No. 24 on the UK Albums Chart. Wakeman promoted it further with a world tour throughout 1981.

== Recording ==
After leaving Yes in early 1980, Wakeman resumed his solo career and reformed his band, the English Rock Ensemble, and completed a European tour. For his next project, Wakeman secured a recording deal with Charisma Records which granted him an advance and without a deadline to complete an album.

Wakeman estimated the album took around two-and-a-half years to produce from conception to completion. It stemmed from his longtime wish of working with other musicians, blend electronic keyboards with an orchestra and choir, and to write an album based on the future rather than historical concepts. He chose to make a concept album based on the 1949 dystopian novel Nineteen Eighty-Four by George Orwell. Despite thinking the book was "lousy", Wakeman adapted it with a more lighthearted approach. He encountered some difficulty with the lyrics as he was unable to write a set that he liked. The music was written during breaks in touring, including a period of time at his home in Beaulieu-sur-Mer near Monaco. He then got Tim Rice to make them more suitable for the songs he was writing. To sing them, Wakeman enlisted a group of vocalists which he thought suited the various tracks on the album, and was able to get his first choice each time.

The album was recorded between 23 February–14 April 1981 at Morgan Studios in London, with Wakeman as the sole producer. It was then cut at Townhouse Studios. Upon completion, the album cost short of £100,000 to make. At the time of recording Wakeman knew what keyboards he wanted to use and ordered some models from Korg, but they failed to arrive in time. Instead, he used a mix of his own instruments with rented or borrowed equipment. Wakeman said the finished product contains just one tape edit which occurs towards the end of "1984" so a better take could be inserted. A tape reversal effect occurs on "Robot Man" with a series of arpeggios and Wakeman's then three-year-old son banging things on the piano.

"Julia" was written during a difficult time that Wakeman and his then wife Danielle were going through. Wakeman added: "I was very low, but the result was that I wrote 'Julia' straight off in just a few minutes. I really wrote it for my wife". Wakeman dedicated the album to his late father Cyril, who died in 1980.

The album's launch party was held on the platform at Aldwych tube station on 11 June 1981.

== Track listing ==
Side one
No.	Title	Writer(s)	Lead vocals	Length
1.	"1984 Overture": a) "Part One"; b) "Part Two"; c) "War Games"	Rick Wakeman, Tim Rice	Chaka Khan	10:57
2.	"Julia"	Wakeman, Rice	Khan	4:45
3.	"Hymn"	Wakeman, Rice	Jon Anderson	3:13
4.	"The Room (Brainwash)"	Wakeman		4:16

Side two
No.	Title	Writer(s)	Lead vocals	Length
1.	"Robot Man"	Wakeman, Rice	Khan, Kenny Lynch	3:55
2.	"Sorry"	Wakeman		3:18
3.	"No Name"	Wakeman, Rice	Steve Harley	3:06
4.	"Forgotten Memories"	Wakeman		2:57
5.	"Proles"	Wakeman, Rice	Rice	3:32
6.	"1984"	Wakeman		6:28

== Personnel ==
Credits adapted from the 1981 and 1994 edition of the album.

Music

- Rick Wakeman – piano, Prophet-5, Prophet 10, RMI synthesiser, Hammond organ, Oberheim OB-X 1 synthesiser, Mini-moog synthesiser, Yamaha CS80 synthesizer, string machine, Synclavier synthesiser
- Steve Barnacle (a.k.a. "Boghead") – Fender bass guitar
- Tim Stone (a.k.a. "Beaky") – guitar
- Tony Fernandez – drums
- Gary Barnacle – selmer saxophone
- Frank Ricotti – Ludwig drums
- Chaka Khan – vocals
- Kenny Lynch – vocals
- Steve Harley – vocals
- Tim Rice – vocals
- Jon Anderson – vocals

Production

- Rick Wakeman – production
- Mark Ellis (a.k.a. "Flood") – tape operator
- Mike Babak (a.k.a. "Albert") – engineer
- Tim Rice – lyrics

== Charts ==
Chart (1981)	Peak position
Australian Albums (Kent Music Report)	10
Norwegian Albums (VG-lista)	36
UK Albums (OCC)	24
