= Rick Wakeman =

English keyboardist (born 1949)

Rick Wakeman CBE
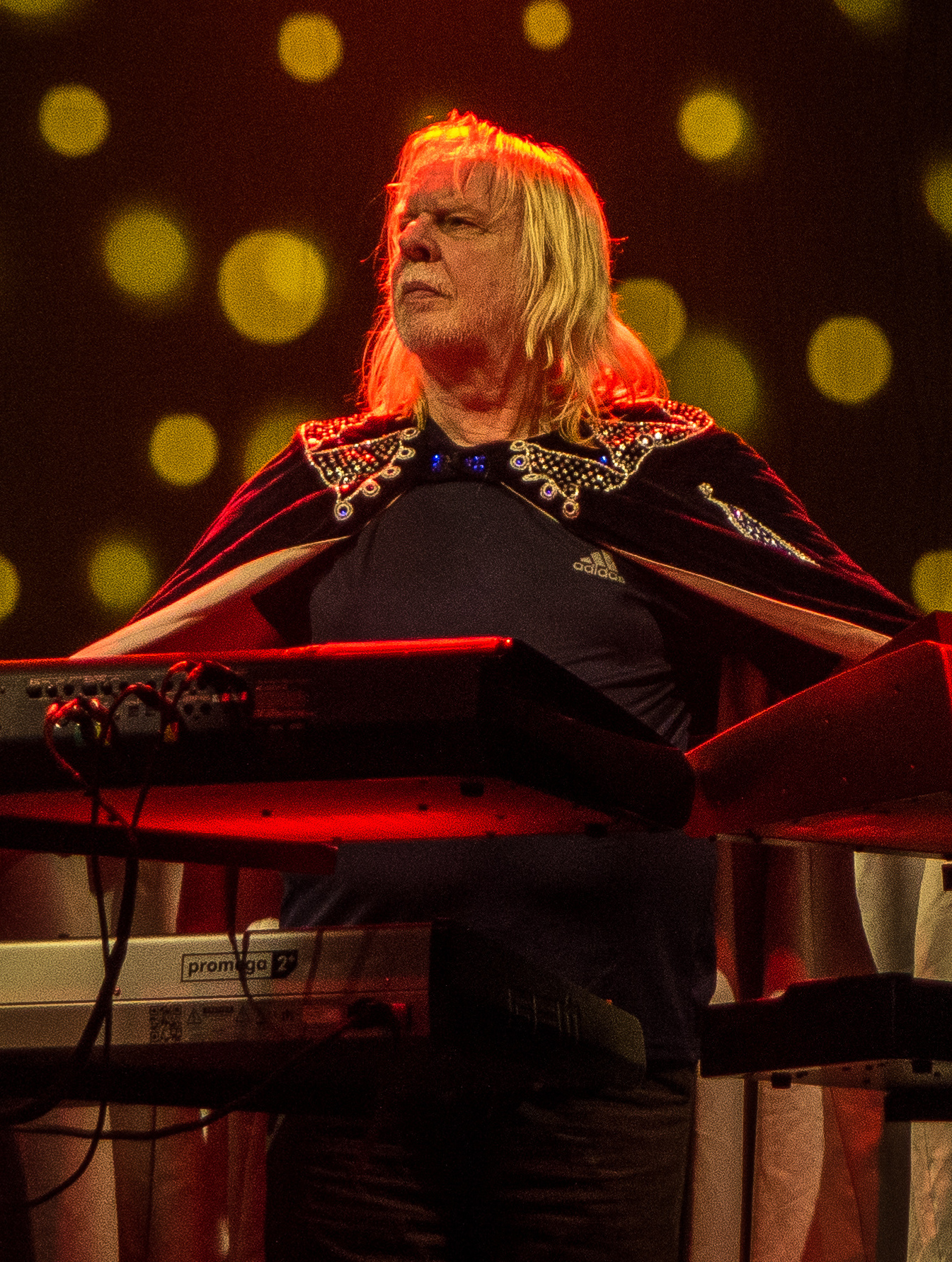
- Wakeman performing in 2017
- Born: Richard Christopher Wakeman; 18 May 1949 (age 77); Perivale, Middlesex, England
- Occupations: Keyboardist; songwriter; producer; television and radio presenter; author
- Years active: 1969–present
- Spouses: Rosaline Woolford (m. 1970; div. 1977) Danielle Corminboeuf (m. 1980; div. 1984) Nina Carter (m. 1984; div. 2004) Rachel Kaufman (m. 2011)
- Children: 6, including Oliver and Adam
- Musical career
- Genres: Progressive rock; classical; ambient; new-age; Christian; instrumental rock
- Instrument: Keyboards
- Labels: A&M; Charisma; Moon; Griffin; President; Coda; Stylus; Ambient; Asaph; Hope; Music Fusion; Castle Communications; Pinnacle; RPM; EMI; Voiceprint; Legends; Classic Pictures; Eagle; Gonzo; Universal Music Group; Sony Classical; R&D; Madfish
- Formerly of: The Strawbs; Yes; Anderson Bruford Wakeman Howe; Yes Featuring Jon Anderson, Trevor Rabin, Rick Wakeman
- Website: rwcc.com

Richard Christopher Wakeman (born 18 May 1949) is an English keyboardist and composer best known for his multiple tenures in the progressive rock band Yes and for his prolific solo career, which has spanned six decades. His most successful and acclaimed albums are his first three progressive rock concept albums–The Six Wives of Henry VIII (1973), the UK number-one Journey to the Centre of the Earth (1974), and The Myths and Legends of King Arthur and the Knights of the Round Table (1975). AllMusic describes Wakeman as a "classically trained keyboardist extraordinaire who plied his trade with Yes and developed his own brand of live spectacular in a solo act."

Born and raised in West London, Wakeman intended to become a concert pianist but quit the Royal College of Music in 1969 and became a sought after session musician. Amongst the estimated 2,000 sessions he did, he played on "Space Oddity" and "Life on Mars?" for David Bowie, "Morning Has Broken" by Cat Stevens, and on tracks for Elton John, Marc Bolan, and Lou Reed. After a brief stint in the folk rock group the Strawbs, during which he received national press attention, he joined Yes in 1971, playing on seminal albums such as Fragile (1971), Close to the Edge (1972) and Tales From Topographic Oceans (1973). His technical virtuosity on keyboards such as the Hammond organ, Moog synthesizer, and Mellotron, combined with his flamboyant stage presence and trademark capes, made him an iconic figure in 1970s progressive rock. In 1974, he formed his touring and recording band, the English Rock Ensemble, and in the following year, expanded into soundtrack work for Ken Russell's feature film Lisztomania (1975).

Wakeman's subsequent career is characterised by its vast productivity and stylistic diversity, with a discography exceeding 100 solo albums. (Note: Wakeman's 2017 album Piano Portraits was marketed as his 100th solo album. The 2018 tour programme for his following album, Piano Odyssey, lists 108 albums.) During the 1980s and 1990s, amidst shifting musical trends and personal financial strain, he transitioned toward low-budget albums for niche markets while maintaining a consistent presence as a live performer through band-led tours and one-man shows featuring music and anecdotal storytelling. This period saw Wakeman diversify into broadcasting and record label management, and pursued new musical directions with his first new-age and Christian music albums, Country Airs (1986) and The Gospels (1987), respectively. A commercial resurgence began with Return to the Centre of the Earth (1999), his first release to reach the UK Top 40 in 18 years, followed by a revisit of his three best-selling concept albums with new and expanded arrangements. His piano album Piano Portraits (2017) was his first UK Top 10 in 42 years. Throughout this time, Wakeman completed a total of five stints with Yes until 2004 and mostly recently performed in the offshoot band Yes Featuring Jon Anderson, Trevor Rabin, and Rick Wakeman from 2016 to 2020.

In addition to music, Wakeman is a well-known media personality, recognised for his appearances on television shows such as Live at Jonguleurs, Countdown and Watchdog, and as a regular on the BBC comedy series Grumpy Old Men. He has published three books, presented a Saturday morning radio show on Planet Rock from 2005 to 2010, and has a podcast. He was inducted into the Rock and Roll Hall of Fame as a member of Yes in 2017, and was appointed a Commander of the Order of the British Empire (CBE) for his services to music and broadcasting in 2021.

== Early life ==
Richard Christopher Wakeman was born on 18 May 1949 at Perivale Maternity Hospital in Perivale, Middlesex. He is the only child of Cyril Frank Wakeman and Mildred Helen Wakeman (née Eastment). The family lived in Wood End Gardens in nearby Northolt. Cyril worked at a building supplier, starting as an office boy at age 14 and working up to become one of its directors; he was also a pianist in Ted Heath's big band while serving in the British Army. Mildred worked at a removals firm. Wakeman attended Wood End Junior School until age ten, before moving on to Drayton Manor Grammar School in Hanwell, spending most of his summer holidays with his parents in Exmouth. Although raised in a Christian household where religion was never forced upon him, Wakeman enjoyed attending South Harrow Baptist Church. He took up the church organ at twelve, joined the Boys' Brigade, and completed a two-year course to qualify as a Sunday school teacher before he was baptised by immersion at eighteen.

Wakeman was inspired to play the piano at the age of five. His parents, aunts and uncle had previously performed as a concert party troupe called The Wakemans until World War II caused them to disband. They occasionally revived the act in the front room on Sunday evenings, playing the piano and singing songs that Wakeman would listen to from his upstairs bedroom. He later recalled climbing out of bed to sit on the bottom of the stairs to listen, eventually being allowed to play a piece himself. "Everybody clapped, and I thought, I'll have some more of that, and refused to go back to bed." Sergei Prokofiev made a profound impression on him after his father took him to a concert performance of Peter and the Wolf around age eight, inspiring him to tell stories through music and making the Russian composer a lifelong hero. Other early musical influences included trad jazz musician Kenny Ball, skiffle singer Lonnie Donegan, and pianist Russ Conway, whose records were among his first purchases. His first keyboard was a simple reed organ bought from Woolworths.

Between the ages of seven and eighteen, Wakeman took classical piano and theory lessons with Dorothy Symes in Harrow. His father spent nearly half of his income on the tuition. Wakeman passed each grade with distinction; Symes recalled him as "an enjoyable pupil to teach, full of fun and with a good sense of humour", though he often lacked the discipline to practise his scales and preferred adapting arrangements into his own style, revealing an early gift for composition. His first public performances were recitals organised by Symes for her pupils' parents, pieces he would fondly remember performing on stage decades later included "Buy a Broom" and "See a Monkey on a Stick". His natural showmanship also emerged early, when, at age ten, he played Conway's honky-tonk hit "Side Saddle" instead of his scheduled Clementi piano sonatina at the annual school talent show. That same year, Symes entered him into the Southall Music Festival, which he won in his category. Over the following years, he accumulated numerous awards on the London competition circuit; biographer Dan Wooding noted he earned over 100 certificates and 20 medals and cups.

Wakeman described himself as "a horror" at Drayton Manor, noting that he worked hard in his first year before easing up. He passed O Level examinations in music, art, maths and English, and went on to study music, art, and British constitution at A-level, failing the latter. Jazz pianist Mike Westbrook served as his A-level art teacher, and Wakeman also played football for the school team.

== Career ==
=== 1962–1969: Early groups and Royal College of Music ===
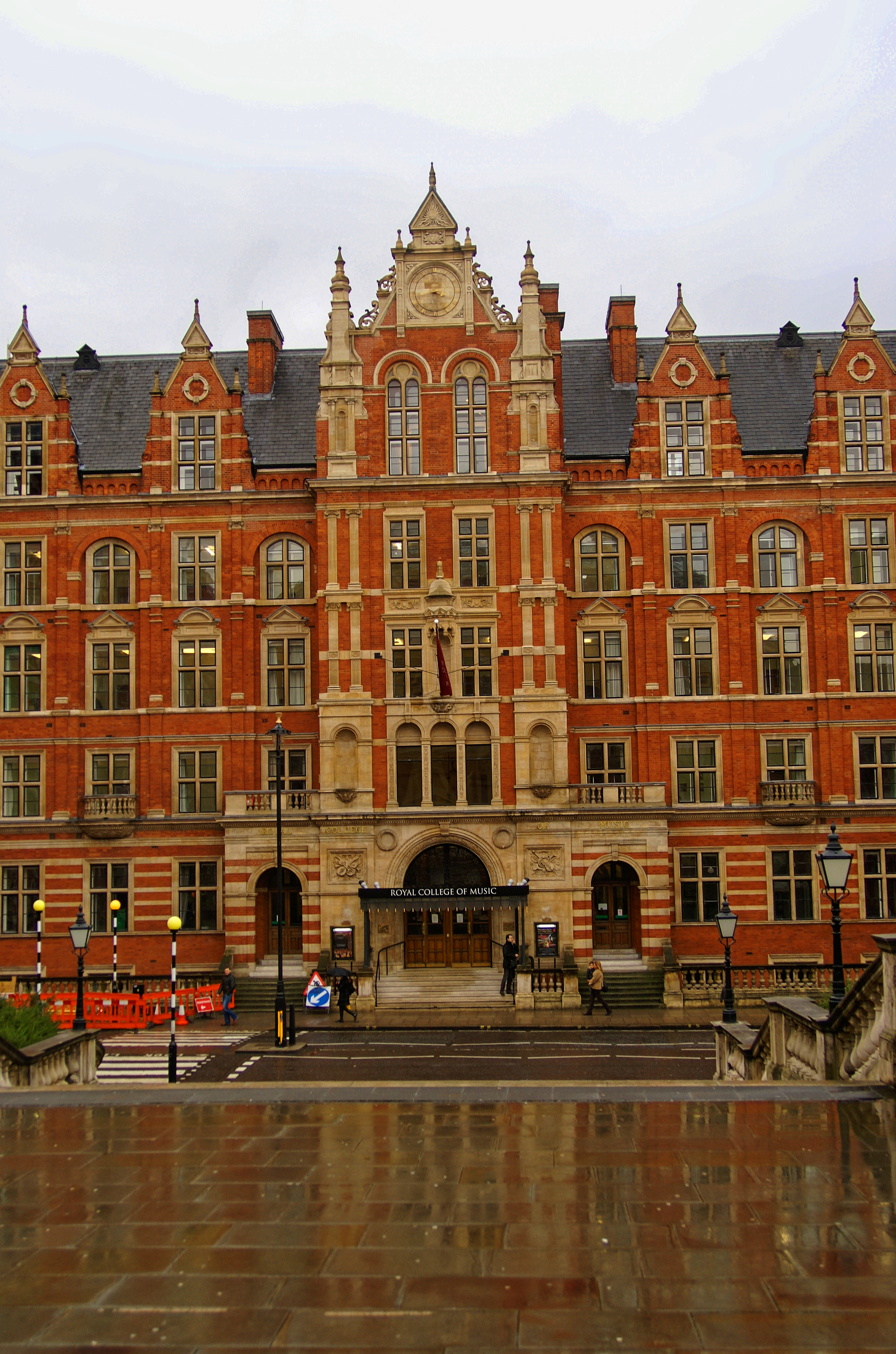
Wakeman attended the Royal College of Music for a year before he quit to become a session musician

Wakeman began his musical career performing in a variety of local jazz, blues, and dance ensembles during his teenage years in West London. At age twelve, he formed the traditional jazz outfit named Brother Wakeman and the Clergymen, followed in 1963 by a year-long residency with the Atlantic Blues at a rehabilitation club in Neasden—an experience he later credited with teaching him the essential discipline of playing in a group. Over the subsequent years, he played pop and dance standards with local groups such as the Concordes (later the Concorde Quartet), which featured his cousin Alan Wakeman on saxophone and clarinet, and the Green Dolphin Trio, which held a residency at the Brent council social club in Alperton. Earnings from these performances led to the purchase of his first electronic keyboard, a Hohner Pianet. In 1967, Wakeman joined the Ronnie Smith Band at the Top Rank ballroom in Watford, where he met vocalist Ashley Holt, who would become a frequent collaborator on his future solo projects. During this period, Wakeman also frequented jam sessions at the Red Lion pub in Brentford, performing alongside notable contemporary musicians including John Entwistle and Mitch Mitchell. These connections led to his first radio appearance when singer James Royal invited him to join a live BBC session alongside Entwistle and guitarist Mick King.

In 1968, Wakeman secured a scholarship to the Royal College of Music in London, aiming to pursue a career as a concert pianist. His admission followed a period of intense study, having been forced to complete two years of curriculum in ten months. Though he initially enrolled in the performer's course, with piano as his primary study and clarinet, orchestration, and modern music as his second, he soon switched to the teacher's course after feeling intimidated by the technical standard of his peers. Despite this shift, his classical tenure provided foundational influences on his future progressive rock career when his orchestration professor, Philip Cannon, introduced him to Nikolai Rimsky-Korsakov's seminal textbook Principles of Orchestration. However, Wakeman's tenure at the college was marked by increasing friction with the institution's traditionalism. His proposals to establish a rock and jazz club were rejected, and he clashed with faculty over his appearance after refusing a professor's demand to cut his hair.

Disillusioned with academia, Wakeman began neglecting his studies and spending time at the Musical Bargain Centre, a music shop in Ealing. The shop's owner, Dave Simms, recognised Wakeman's potential and employed him as a pianist in his own dance band. Wakeman's breakthrough into the professional recording industry occurred when guitarist Chas Cronk visited the shop seeking an organist and brass arranger for a session with Jimmy Thomas, a vocalist for the Ike & Tina Turner Revue. Simms recommended Wakeman, who attended the session at Olympic Studios where he met influential producers Denny Cordell, Gus Dudgeon, and Tony Visconti. Though he initially struggled with the technicalities of scoring for brass—incorrectly writing the parts in concert pitch—his playing style impressed Cordell, who subsequently offered Wakeman freelance session work for Regal Zonophone Records. This lucrative outside work provided a necessary supplement to his small student grant but directly violated the college's official rules against external professional engagements. Encouraged by his clarinet professor, Basil Tschaikov, to follow his professional momentum, Wakeman officially withdrew from the Royal College of Music in 1969 after one year of study.

=== 1969–1970: Session career and rise to prominence ===
Following his departure from the Royal College of Music, Wakeman secured a steady income by returning to the Ronnie Smith band at the Top Rank ballroom in Reading. This period proved significant personally as well as professionally; he met his first wife, Rosaline Woolford, at the venue, and the pair were engaged within three months. Later that year, Wakeman accepted a seven-day-a-week residency with the Spinning Wheel, the house band at The Greyhound pub in Chadwell Heath. This stable employment allowed him to leave his family home in Northolt and relocate with Woolford to a basement flat in nearby Ilford.

To supplement his evening residencies, Wakeman worked as a freelance session musician during the day, embarking on a rigorous schedule that often encompassed three or four sessions daily across various London studios. Starting at a rate of £9 per full session, his reputation for efficiency and technical precision soon commanded fees of up to £15. His ability to deliver the required arrangements with minimal rehearsal earned him the nickname One Take Wakeman. He formed a prolific partnership with prominent session contractor David Katz, who frequently employed Wakeman as his primary pianist for television scores, including the theme tunes for The Avengers and Jason King.

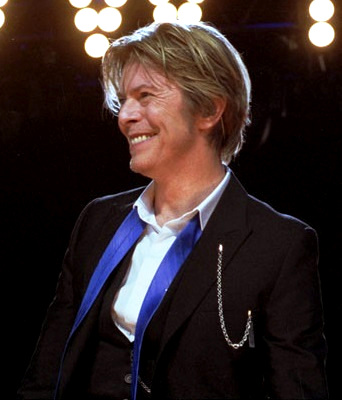
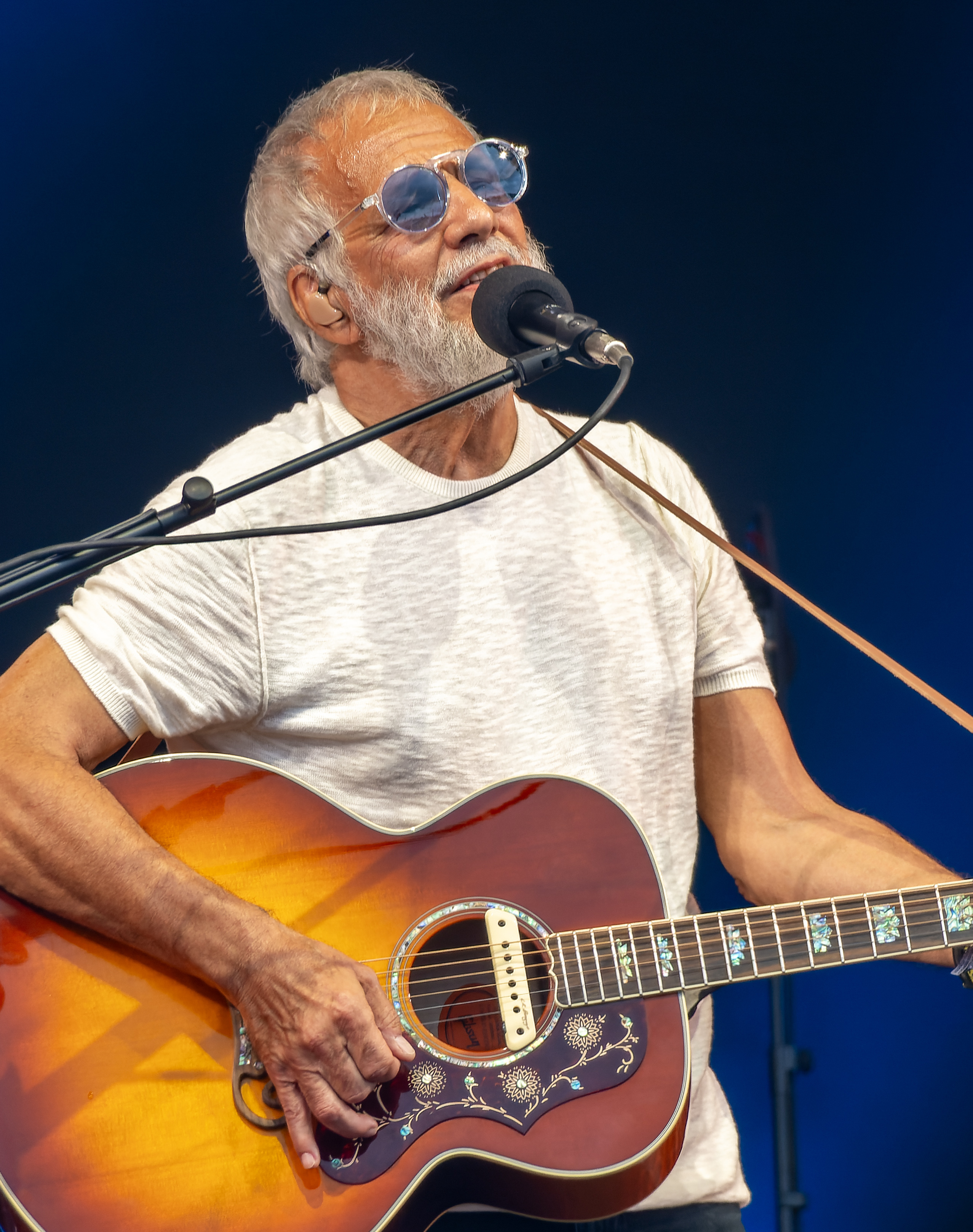
Wakeman gained initial fame as a session musician and played with a variety of contemporary musicians, including hits by David Bowie (left) and Cat Stevens (right)

Wakeman's transition into high-profile session work began in early 1969 with the psychedelic rock band Junior's Eyes. Under the production of Visconti and Cordell, he contributed to a non-album single and their debut LP, Battersea Power Station (1969). This collaboration proved a catalyst for his career; when Dudgeon sought a Mellotron player for David Bowie's "Space Oddity", Visconti—who had been impressed by Wakeman's technical facility—recommended him. The June 1969 session at Trident Studios showcased the efficiency that would define Wakeman's reputation. Dudgeon later recalled: "We did a run-through and Rick came in at the right place. And what he played was exactly what I wanted... We did one more take and it was a master. I thought, 'This is weird. This strange bloke... off he went, just like that, back to his ballroom job.'" For his performance on the track, which eventually peaked at number one in the UK in 1975, Wakeman was paid a standard session fee of £9. The recording garnered him his first media coverage: an interview with the Middlesex County Times.

His contributions to Bowie's self-titled 1969 album extended to the B-sides "Wild Eyed Boy from Freecloud" and "Memory of a Free Festival". The professional bond between the two remained strong. In July 1970, Bowie supported Wakeman with an acoustic set at the White Hart pub in Acton. Intended to clear debts from the Booze Droop—a failing folk club residency Wakeman had organised—the performance was famously poorly attended; only a dozen people appeared, as many locals dismissed the advertisements as a hoax.

Throughout this period, Wakeman's studio career continued to diversify. In a gesture of support, Visconti booked Wakeman for Marsha Hunt's cover of "I Walk on Guilded Splinters", tasking him with playing a single piano note solely to ensure he qualified for the session fee. The two also collaborated with Marc Bolan on a one-off project, releasing the single "Oh My Love" under the pseudonym Dib Cochran and the Earwigs. Around this time, Wakeman was approached by bassist Nick Simper to join Warhorse, a new project formed following Simper's departure from Deep Purple. Although he participated in several rehearsals, Wakeman departed before the band's first demo recordings, with Simper later attributing the split to Wakeman's struggle adapting to the band's hard rock direction.

By the end of his session career, Wakeman had contributed to what is estimated to be approximately 2,000 sessions encompassing pop records, television and radio jingles, and film soundtracks. Despite his considerable financial success, he grew increasingly disillusioned with the industry. He felt constrained by the "hired hand" nature of the work, and the lack of creative input in the songwriting process left him artistically unfulfilled, prompting him to seek a permanent role within an established band.

=== 1970–1971: Strawbs and peak session era ===
In March 1970, Dave Cousins invited Wakeman to join the folk rock group Strawbs for a week's residency at a rock circus in Paris. Wakeman had previously contributed piano to their second album, Dragonfly (1970), the first recording to feature his name in the liner notes. Having married Woolford just weeks prior, Wakeman accepted the offer despite a reduction in pay, and the trip served as a working honeymoon. A notable incident occurred during one performance when surrealist artist Salvador Dalí made an unannounced guest appearance on stage; unaware of Dalí's identity, Wakeman accidentally pushed the artist off the platform to continue his keyboard solo.

Wakeman's status shifted to that of a national star following the Strawbs' headline concert at London's Queen Elizabeth Hall on 11 July 1970. The performance, captured on the live album Just a Collection of Antiques and Curios (1970), showcased his technical virtuosity on the piano and Hammond organ. Two tracks in particular drew critical acclaim: "Where is This Dream of Your Youth", which featured an expansive, classically influenced organ solo, and "Temperament of Mind", a solo piano piece developed from improvisations used to entertain audiences during equipment failures. The performance earned a standing ovation and prompted a landmark front-page story in Melody Maker, which hailed Wakeman as "tomorrow's superstar" and the "pop find of 1970". During this period, he began developing the theatrical stage presence that would become his trademark, including the use of a screw-studded wooden plank to physically depress organ keys, allowing him to perform complex lead lines with both hands simultaneously.

Wakeman maintained a prolific session schedule alongside his work with the Strawbs. He composed the theme tune to the BBC television show Ask Aspel and, in early 1971, provided the distinctive piano arrangement for Cat Stevens' UK top-ten hit "Morning Has Broken". Though initially uncredited, Stevens later apologised for the omission and, in 2002, arranged for a back-payment of royalties, which Wakeman donated to one of Stevens' educational charities. His studio versatility also led to collaborations with Elton John, with Wakeman contributing Hammond organ to Madman Across the Water (1971) and appearing as a guest performer at John's Royal Festival Hall concert that March.

Despite these high-profile credits, Wakeman's finances remained precarious. Following a chance encounter with Bolan on Oxford Street while struggling to pay weekly rent, he recorded a series of piano glissandos for T. Rex's "Get It On" primarily to secure the session fee. However, his most significant artistic development occurred in June 1971, when Bowie invited him to his Beckenham home to audition material for his next album, Hunky Dory (1971). . Wakeman later described the songs, which included "Life on Mars?" and "Changes", as the finest selection of songs he had ever heard. His piano contributions became central to the album's sound, and he credited Bowie with teaching him essential studio craft.

By mid-1971, Wakeman's session earnings allowed him to move to West Harrow and invest in new technology. He famously purchased a Minimoog synthesizer at half price from actor Jack Wild, who mistakenly believed the instrument was defective because it could only play one note at a time. During this period, the budget label Polydor released Piano Vibrations (1971), an album of pop and jazz covers featuring Wakeman alongside the John Schroeder orchestra and an unnamed singer; he was paid a flat fee of £36 and received no credit on the sleeve.

Wakeman's final studio effort with the Strawbs was From the Witchwood, released in July 1971. The recording process exposed a growing creative rift; Cousins rejected Wakeman's songwriting contributions as overly complex and deemed his lyrics "awful", while Wakeman began prioritising session work over band rehearsals. Tensions peaked during a Top of the Pops performance of "The Hangman and the Papist", where Wakeman's flamboyant use of a paint roller to play his organ frustrated Cousins. Recognising that his interest in the band's folk direction had waned, Wakeman prepared to leave the group and briefly considered assembling his own band.

=== 1971–1973: First tenure with Yes ===
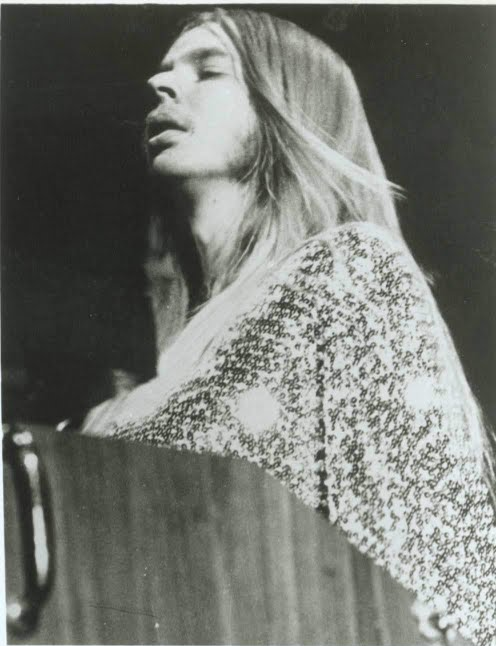
Wakeman in 1973. By this time, he had a distinctive look of long blonde hair and wearing a cape on stage

In July 1971, Wakeman reached a pivotal juncture in his career when he was simultaneously invited to join Bowie's new backing group, the Spiders from Mars, and the progressive rock band Yes. The latter offer arose following the dismissal of founding keyboardist Tony Kaye, whose reluctance to expand beyond the piano and organ conflicted with the band's desire to incorporate more electronic instrumentation. Wakeman chose Yes, citing the greater musical freedom and long-term potential. His arrival was a significant industry event, earning him his second Melody Maker cover feature within a year, while his weekly salary increased from £18 to £50.

Wakeman made an immediate impact during rehearsals for Fragile (1971), contributing heavily to the arrangements of the band's signature tracks "Roundabout" and "Heart of the Sunrise". The album was recorded in just five weeks to facilitate a return to touring, which was necessary to finance Wakeman's expanding array of equipment. In keeping with the album's concept of featuring a solo piece from each member, Wakeman recorded "Cans and Brahms", a multi-tracked synthesiser adaptation of the third movement of Brahms' Symphony No. 4. He later expressed dissatisfaction with the track, labelling it "dreadful"; he explained that a contractual dispute between Yes's label, Atlantic Records, and his previous label, A&M, prevented him from recording an original composition. Despite his significant creative input, including piano sections on "South Side of the Sky", Wakeman received no formal songwriting credits. Although management had promised to resolve the oversight, he chose not to pursue the matter further to maintain band harmony.

The commercial success of Fragile transformed Wakeman's personal and professional standing. His increased earnings enabled a move to a large residence in Gerrards Cross and the establishment of the Fragile Carriage Company, a business through which he managed a growing collection of luxury cars for hire. The subsequent tour marked Wakeman's debut performances in North America, during which he leveraged his rising profile to secure a five-album solo contract with A&M. His rising profile was reflected in the 1972 Melody Maker readers' poll, where he was ranked the second-best keyboardist, trailing Keith Emerson.

In 1972, Yes released Close to the Edge, now regarded as a landmark album of the progressive rock genre. The album showcased Wakeman’s expanding technical range, incorporating diverse instrumentation such as the harpsichord and a pipe organ. Unlike his uncredited work on Fragile, Wakeman received a formal arrangement credit for the final track, "Siberian Khatru". During the subsequent American tour in September 1972 Wakeman began to wear a cape on stage, becoming the visual trademark that would define his public image. After an audience member offered him a cape for free, Wakeman commissioned his own bespoke versions, the first of which was a $300 sequined one designed by Denise Gandrup. Combined with his long blonde hair, the capes provided a striking visual contrast to the more reserved stage presence of his bandmates. Wakeman's performances during this period were documented on the live album Yessongs (1973) and its subsequent concert film. His versatility beyond Yes continued with a guest appearance in the orchestral performances of the Who's Tommy (1972) at the Rainbow Theatre and contributions to the soundtrack of the British drama film Zee and Co. (1972).

=== 1973–1974: Solo breakthrough and departure from Yes ===
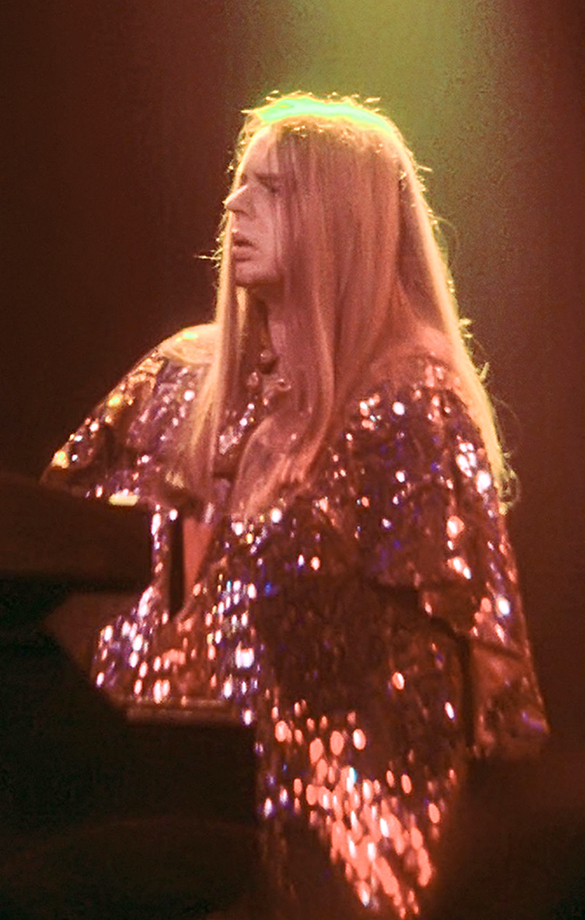
Wakeman in March 1974, towards the end of his first stint in Yes

In January 1973, A&M released Wakeman's debut solo studio album, The Six Wives of Henry VIII. Recorded intermittently throughout 1972, the instrumental concept album featured his personal musical interpretations of the personalities of Henry VIII's wives with contributions from his bandmates in Yes and the Strawbs alongside various session musicians. Wakeman's profile was significantly boosted by a fortuitous television appearance on The Old Grey Whistle Test; a large segment of the national audience, displaced by the last-minute censorship of Andy Warhol's Blue Movie, tuned in to see Wakeman perform "Catherine Howard" on the show. He later reflected that this accidental exposure was a "tremendous break" that introduced his music to the wider British public. The album was a commercial and critical success, reaching No. 7 in the UK and No. 30 in the US, where it was certified Gold for selling 500,000 copies. Time magazine named it one of the year's best records, and the 1973 Melody Maker readers' poll saw Wakeman overtake Emerson to be named top keyboardist.

Wakeman's solo triumph contrasted with his growing alienation during the sessions for Yes's double concept album, Tales from Topographic Oceans (1973). He was sceptical of the project's esoteric themes, based on scriptures outlined in Paramahansa Yogananda's Autobiography of a Yogi, and felt the music was overextended and insufficiently rehearsed. He distanced himself from the group during recording, frequently retreating to the studio bar and contributing to Black Sabbath's "Sabbra Cadabra" in the adjacent studio. His frustration peaked during the subsequent six-month tour; in a well-publicised act of protest against the setlist, he ate a takeaway curry on stage during a performance at the Free Trade Hall in Manchester. Though he later acknowledged some "very nice musical moments" on the album, he maintained that the material suffered from "awful" padding.

During a hiatus in the Yes tour, Wakeman recorded Journey to the Centre of the Earth, a 40-minute adaptation of the Jules Verne novel conceived in 1971 that required an orchestra, choir, and rock band. To finance the £40,000 production costs, Wakeman re-mortgaged his home, sold several of his luxury cars, and was forced to record the work live in concert. The performance took place at the Royal Festival Hall on 18 January 1974 with the London Symphony Orchestra and the English Chamber Choir conducted by David Measham, and featured narration by actor David Hemmings. For his band, Wakeman enlisted musicians that he had played with in a West London pub–vocalist Gary Pickford-Hopkins, drummer Barney James, and bassist Roger Newell–with his former Top Rank bandmate Ashley Holt on second vocals, and session guitarist Mike Egan. Despite initial resistance from A&M's UK division, the label's co-founder Jerry Moss personally ordered its worldwide release.

Following the conclusion of the Tales from Topographic Oceans tour, Wakeman confirmed his departure from Yes on 18 May 1974, his 25th birthday. Later that day, he learned that Journey had entered the UK charts at number one, a first for A&M. The album reached No. 3 in the US, received a Grammy Award nomination for Best Pop Instrumental Performance, and was certified Gold in the UK, US, Australia, Canada, and Brazil. However, the physical demands of his career reached a breaking point during a headline performance at the Crystal Palace Garden Party in July 1974. Suffering from exhaustion, a wrist injury, and the effects of excessive smoking and alcohol, Wakeman required morphine injections to finish the show; shortly thereafter, he suffered a minor heart attack.

=== 1974–1976: King Arthur, commercial peak, and No Earthly Connection ===
While recovering in hospital from his heart attack, Wakeman disregarded medical advice to moderate his lifestyle and reduce his workload; he continued to smoke and drink while beginning to compose music for his next project. He settled on another concept album, this time based on Arthurian legend, titled The Myths and Legends of King Arthur and the Knights of the Round Table. Before recording commenced, Wakeman embarked on his first solo world tour in September 1974. The initial 20-city North American leg featured his backing band alongside the National Philharmonic Orchestra and Choir of America conducted by David Measham, performing Journey to the Centre of the Earth and selections from The Six Wives of Henry VIII. Under strict medical instructions, Wakeman was required to pass a heart monitor test before taking the stage each night. The tour concluded in March 1975 following dates in Japan, Australia, and New Zealand.

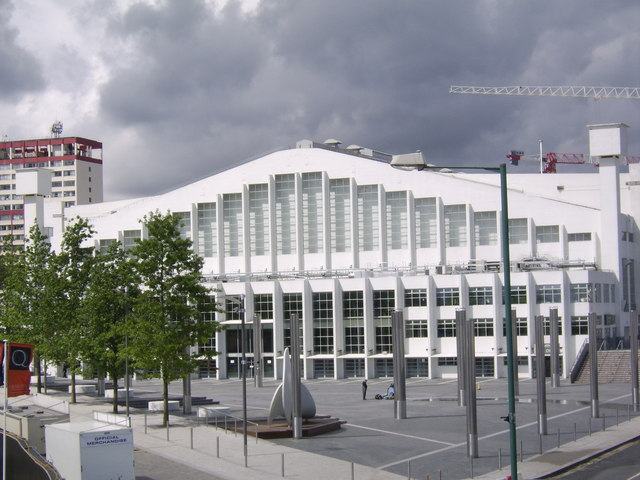
Wakeman supported his King Arthur album with concerts at Wembley Arena with ice skaters

Recording for King Arthur was completed at Morgan Studios in January 1975, featuring Wakeman's band and Measham conducting the New World Orchestra and English Chamber Choir. Released that March, the album reached No. 2 in the UK and No. 21 in the US, earning a gold certification in the UK for selling 100,000 copies, as well as in Brazil, Japan, and Australia. To promote the record, Wakeman staged three sold-out shows at London's Empire Pool for a total of 27,000 spectators. Because the venue floor was already frozen for another attraction, Wakeman presented the concert as an ice pageant featuring 14 costumed skaters and a castle-themed stage set in the round. Although the production was a commercial success, it was prohibitively expensive to produce. The shows were later ranked 79th on VH1's 100 Greatest Shocking Moments in Rock and Roll. The album's opening track, "Arthur", subsequently served as the theme music for BBC general election broadcasts from 1979 to 2005 (with the exception of 2001), and from 2019 onwards.

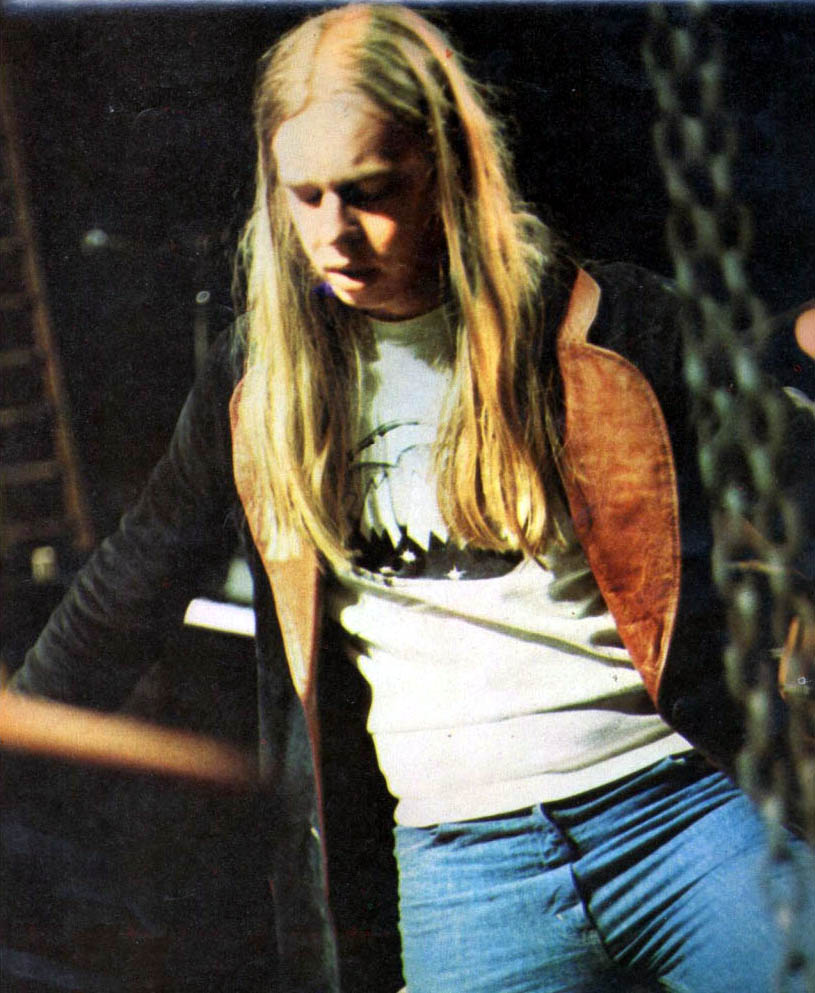
Wakeman in 1975

By mid-1975, Wakeman had reached the height of his commercial success. He was featured on the cover of Rolling Stone in January and managed his business interests with a staff payroll through Complex 7, a group of companies with a dedicated rehearsal facility at a former bus depot in High Wycombe. His personal wealth was reflected in his acquisition of a farmhouse in Woodbury Salterton, Devon, and a former nursing home in Burnham Beeches, Buckinghamshire, which he used to house his luxury car collection. His career was profiled in an episode of the BBC documentary series Success Story in September 1975.

Wakeman assembled a new line-up of his band, by now officially named the English Rock Ensemble, which consisted of Holt, Newell, and Hodgson, alongside newcomers John Dunsterville on guitar, Reg Brooks and Martin Shields on brass, and Tony Fernandez on drums. Fernandez became a mainstay of Wakeman's future projects, touring with him until 2022. The group toured major arenas across the US, Canada, and Brazil from October to December 1975, performing selections from Wakeman's first three studio albums. The Brazilian leg was particularly successful, with biographer Dan Wooding estimating a total attendance of 500,000 people.

During this period, Wakeman composed and recorded the soundtrack for Lisztomania (1975), a surrealist biopic of composer Franz Liszt directed by Ken Russell. The album features the English Rock Ensemble and vocals by the film's star, Roger Daltrey, while Wakeman appeared on-screen as the Norse god Thor, covered entirely in silver paint. The soundtrack reached No. 145 in the US but failed to chart in the UK. Wakeman later expressed deep dissatisfaction with the project, citing poor production and a lack of his own original material; he eventually supervised a reissue of his original score entitled The Real Lisztomania in 2002.

No Earthly Connection was recorded in early 1976 at Château d'Hérouville in France with the English Rock Ensemble. Although initially conceived as an exploration of mythological gods, the album's thematic focus shifted toward "the origins of mysterious phenomena" such as Stonehenge and the Bermuda Triangle, reportedly inspired by Wakeman’s sighting of a UFO while on tour. He composed the music in its entirety before playing any of it, describing the work in the liner notes as a "futuristic, autobiographical look at music" across human existence. The centrepiece of the album is the 28-minute suite "Music Reincarnate", divided into five distinct sections. Released in April 1976, the album reached No. 9 in the UK and No. 67 in the US. Wakeman and his group toured the album across Europe, concluding in August.

=== 1976–1980: Second Yes tenure and final A&M albums ===
Following his 1976 solo tour, Wakeman faced a severe financial crisis. High operating costs and accrued tax liabilities resulted in a personal debt of £350,000, forcing him to liquidate his Rolls-Royce collection, shutter his Fragile car service company, and disband the English Rock Ensemble. He secured financial relief through a substantial royalty advance from A&M Records and by completing the soundtrack for White Rock, a documentary film covering the 1976 Winter Olympics in Innsbruck that reached number 14 in the UK. The score included "After the Ball", a track Wakeman entirely improvised in a single take after forgetting to compose the piece prior to the recording session. During this period, Wakeman's manager, Brian Lane, proposed the formation of a progressive rock supergroup featuring former Yes bandmate Bill Bruford and King Crimson bassist John Wetton. The trio rehearsed for six weeks, but the project collapsed due to management disputes and premature coverage in the music press.

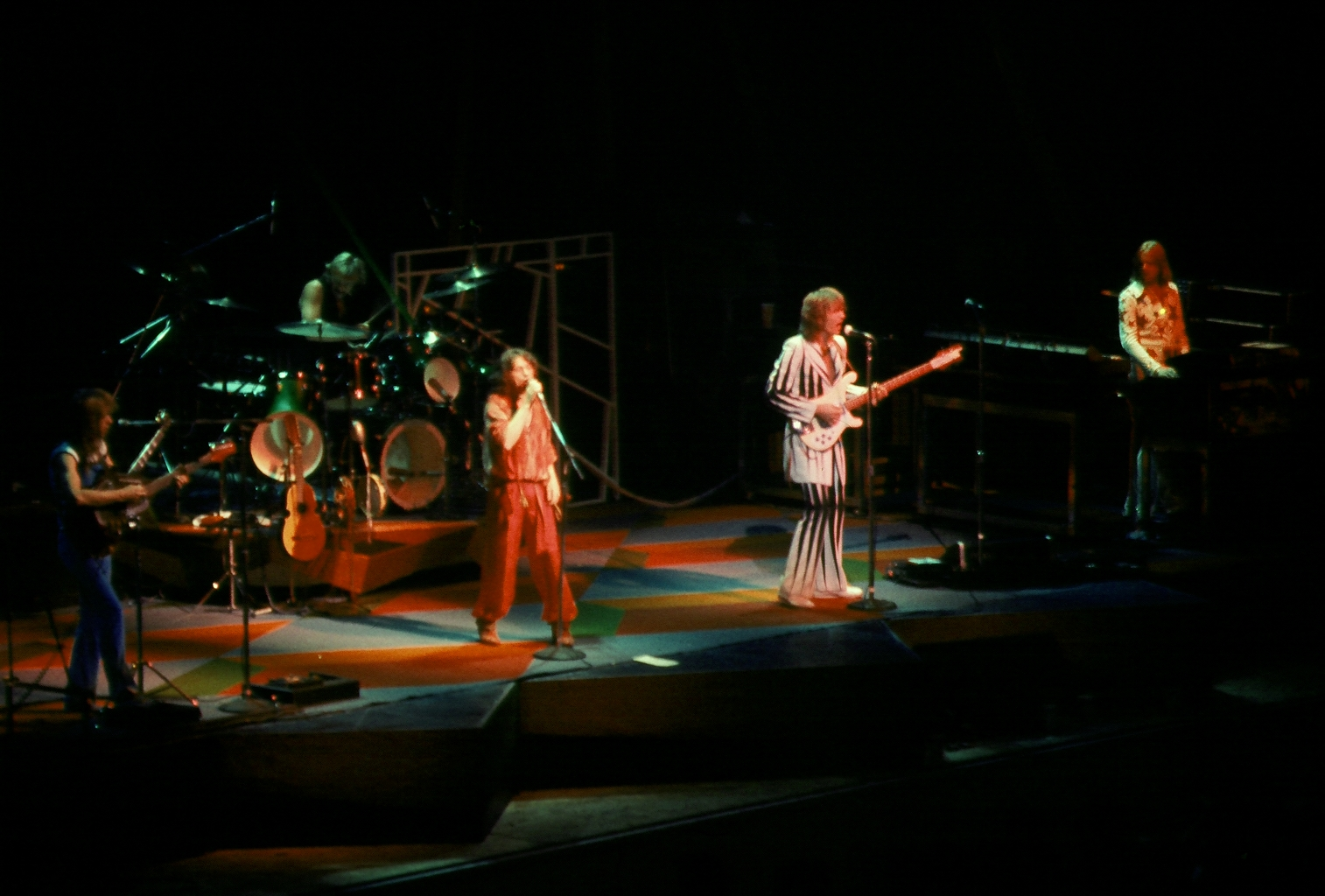
Yes performing in 1977, during Wakeman's (far right) second stint with the band

Wakeman's professional fortunes shifted in November 1976 when he was invited to join Yes in Montreux, Switzerland, during the recording sessions for Going for the One (1977). The band's previous keyboardist, Patrick Moraz, had departed due to internal pressures, and Wakeman found the new material more accessible and musically satisfying than the group's previous experimental direction. Though initially hired as a session musician, he quickly agreed to rejoin the band as a full-time member. This international relocation was executed as a tax exile and ultimately coincided with the permanent separation from his first wife, Rosaline. His official return was complicated when Lane leaked the news to Melody Maker without consulting him, resulting in a premature front-page announcement. During the recording of the follow-up album, Tormato (1978), Wakeman extensively utilised the Birotron, a unique tape-replay keyboard instrument he had helped fund. The album's final title and cover art were famously inspired by an incident in which Wakeman, frustrated by the band's initial artwork choice, threw a tomato at the design boards.

Wakeman's final solo releases for A&M Records saw him return to instrumental concepts. Rick Wakeman's Criminal Record (1977), loosely themed around criminality, was recorded in Montreux. Wakeman recorded his keyboard tracks first, before inviting Yes bandmates Chris Squire and Alan White to contribute bass and drums to the album's first side. Instead of providing preconceived arrangements, Wakeman granted the rhythm section complete creative freedom, intentionally leaving the studio entirely while they tracked their parts. "The Breathalyser" features a humorous guest vocal from comedian Bill Oddie. The album reached No. 25 in the UK and No. 28 in the US; its track "Birdman of Alcatraz" gained further recognition when it was used as the theme to the BBC television drama series My Son, My Son and subsequently released as a single. Wakeman's final effort for the label, the double album Rhapsodies (1979), was also recorded in Montreux and featured shorter tracks spanning diverse musical styles, with Bruce Lynch, Frank Gibson Jr., and Tony Visconti appearing as guest musicians. It peaked at No. 25 in the UK. Following a 1979 tour, Yes attempted to record new material in Paris and London; however, these sessions were ultimately aborted due to deep creative differences and internal friction. In early 1980, both Wakeman and lead vocalist Jon Anderson exited the group, concluding Wakeman's second tenure with the band.

=== 1980–1984: Financial instability and Charisma years ===
Following a four-year hiatus, Wakeman reformed the English Rock Ensemble for a European tour in 1980. That same year, he declined an invitation to form a rock supergroup with drummer Carl Palmer, bassist John Wetton, and guitarist Trevor Rabin. Despite the project's high commercial potential, Wakeman opted out on a matter of principle after discovering the record company was prepared to sign the band without hearing any of their music—a decision he later reflected had effectively "sealed [his] financial fate." Palmer and Wetton ultimately formed Asia. The death of his father in November 1980, coupled with the beginning of his second divorce, prompted Wakeman to leave Switzerland and return to England. Facing bankruptcy, he experienced a brief period of homelessness, sleeping in Kensington Gardens before finding temporary accommodation with a former roadie.

To stave off bankruptcy, Wakeman signed a record deal with Tony Stratton-Smith of Charisma Records. His first release for the label was 1984 (1981), a concept rock album based on George Orwell's eponymous dystopian novel. The project featured lyrics by Tim Rice and included guest vocals from Jon Anderson, Chaka Khan, and Kenny Lynch. The album reached No. 24 in the UK, becoming Wakeman's highest-charting album of the decade, though concurrent plans to adapt the material into a full stage musical were ultimately halted by legal intervention from the Orwell estate. A subsequent world tour followed in 1981, featuring a line-up of drummer Tony Fernandez, guitarist Tim Stone, bassist Steve Barnacle, and vocalist Cori Josias, though the performances were marred by growing internal friction among the band members. Before the tour Wakeman travelled to South Africa for two performances of Journey to the Centre of the Earth in Durban.

Throughout 1981 and 1982, Wakeman diversified his creative output by focusing on television and film scores. He composed and recorded the soundtrack for the American slasher film The Burning (1981) and later wrote the score for G'olé!, the official documentary of the 1982 FIFA World Cup. In 1982, he also released the humorous album Rock 'n' Roll Prophet on his independent Moon Records label. Intended as a satirical spoof of the synth-pop duo the Buggles, the album featured the eccentric single "I'm So Straight I'm a Weirdo" with Wakeman on lead vocals. Although the material had originally been recorded in Switzerland in 1979, it had remained unreleased until Wakeman successfully secured the legal rights to the master tapes. The accompanying music video famously featured a cameo appearance by a young Boy George. In early 1983 Wakeman expanded into broadcasting, co-hosting the Channel 4 music programme GasTank alongside Tony Ashton.

Despite this sustained productivity, Wakeman's third album for Charisma, Cost of Living (1983), failed to chart. Its commercial failure left him in a precarious financial state which he later described as being completely "managerless, penniless and homeless". Following the birth of his daughter Jemma, he moved his family to Camberley, Surrey, and continued to rely heavily on film commissions for income. He contributed the score to the animated film B.C. Rock (1984) and collaborated once more with Ken Russell on the erotic drama Crimes of Passion (1984), building the score around the musical themes of Antonín Dvořák's Symphony No. 9. That same year, he composed the soundtrack for the adventure film She (1984), which featured collaborative vocal performances from Justin Hayward and Maggie Bell, while other conceptual projects from this era, including a score for a ballet titled Killing Games, were ultimately shelved during development.

=== 1984–1988: President Records, personal recovery, and new musical directions ===
"[I] realised that there was a lot of independent labels starting up all over the place. So I contacted different countries, different labels and said look, what sort of music can you sell ... or are you looking for ... Of a period of about four years I produced about 30-odd different CDs for different markets around the world. And all of them, very, very small budgets ... it kept me alive, and kept me hanging on."

— Rick Wakeman on the impact the 1980s and 1990s had on his career

In 1984, Wakeman began a 23-year association with the independent label President Records, eventually producing nearly 40 albums for the company. His inaugural release for the label, Silent Nights (1985), was his first solo studio effort in over two years. Recorded with a backing band featuring guitarist Rick Fenn and bassist Chas Cronk, the album featured the single "Glory Boys", which gained national exposure in the UK. During this period, Wakeman also expanded his portfolio of television music, composing theme tunes for the ITV drama Lytton's Diary, the tech programme Database, the BBC show Paddles Up, and the documentary Supercat.

To support Silent Nights, Wakeman embarked on his first full-scale world tour in four years, which included his first North American performances since 1979. The British leg of the tour was documented on the album Live at Hammersmith (1985). Despite the tour's scale, it proved a financial failure, leaving Wakeman in debt and forcing him and his third wife, Nina Carter, to remortgage their home. The Australian leg of the tour in September 1985 marked a critical turning point in Wakeman's personal life. After falling dangerously ill due to his long-standing alcoholism, he committed to sobriety and has remained teetotal since. Following his recovery, Wakeman resumed high-profile session work by reuniting with David Bowie to provide the distinctive piano contribution for the 1986 single "Absolute Beginners".

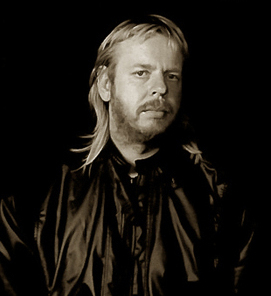
A promotional headshot from 1988

The latter half of the 1980s was defined by Wakeman's diversification into New Age and Christian music. In 1986, he released his first New Age album, Country Airs, a collection of minimalist solo piano pieces inspired by a walk in the British countryside. Although Wakeman later admitted he recorded the album in just two days primarily to secure a desperately needed £5,000 advance to clear pressing bills, it became an unexpected commercial success, topping the UK New Age chart. This success solidified his association with the genre, leading to a weekly New Age radio residency on Capital Radio and the release of The Family Album (1987), which featured compositions dedicated to his relatives and pets alongside original scores for the films The Day After the Fair and Mackintosh.

Wakeman's first Christian release was his 1987 double album The Gospels. Based on the four canonical gospels, the project featured operatic tenor Ramon Remedios, narrator Robert Powell, and the Eton College Chapel Choir. Originally conceived for a brief 1985 church fundraising concert, the work was expanded into a full studio production and premiered at the Royal Albert Hall. A subsequent 1988 performance in Caesarea, Israel, was broadcast to an international television audience. During this period, Wakeman maintained ties to the rock and pop worlds, touring Australia in 1987 as a guest member of the instrumental rock band Sky. He also returned to conceptual rock with Time Machine (1988), loosely inspired by the H. G. Wells science-fiction novel. The album featured guest vocalists Roy Wood and Tracy Ackerman, though Wakeman's grand ambitions of staging the album alongside a full orchestra, choir, and a celebrity ice show were ultimately abandoned due to insufficient funding.

In March 1988, motivated by a need to stabilise their finances, Wakeman and Carter relocated the family to Peel on the Isle of Man. He converted a coach house on the property into a private 24-track recording facility, which he named Bajonor Studios—an acronym derived from the first names of his family members. The studio was a strategic financial compromise; Wakeman had previously lost film-scoring opportunities due to the prohibitive costs of renting commercial London studios, and the private facility drastically lowered his production overheads. Bajonor served as his primary recording base from 1990 until 2001, beginning with his Aspirant ambient album trilogy, from which Wakeman pledged 50p of every sale to CPRE, The Countryside Charity. While living on the island, Wakeman befriended fellow resident and comedy actor Norman Wisdom. The two formed a close personal bond over charity golf tournaments and a shared perfectionism in the studio, which resulted in Wakeman producing and arranging an album of Wisdom's unreleased melodic show tunes.

=== 1988–1997: Third and fourth Yes tenures and media transition ===
In late 1988, Wakeman reunited with former Yes bandmates Jon Anderson, Bill Bruford, and Steve Howe to form a new progressive rock group, Anderson Bruford Wakeman Howe (ABWH). The band originated when Anderson became increasingly frustrated with Yes's commercialised pop direction and left the band to create music that reflected their progressive 1970s sound. Their self-titled album was released in 1989, and the supporting world tour marked Wakeman's first major performances in the US in ten years. Tracks originally recorded for a second album later merged with an in-progress Yes project and released as Union in 1991. This transformed Yes into a combined eight-piece formation, with Wakeman sharing keyboard duties with original member Tony Kaye. Wakeman has openly stated his dislike for Union, partly because external session musicians were brought in to rewrite and overdub parts that he and Howe had already recorded. However, he later chose the 1991–1992 Union Tour as his favourite with Yes, largely due to the strong friendship he formed with their 1980s guitarist and singer-songwriter Trevor Rabin. Wakeman confirmed his second exit from the group in 1993 following managerial disputes.

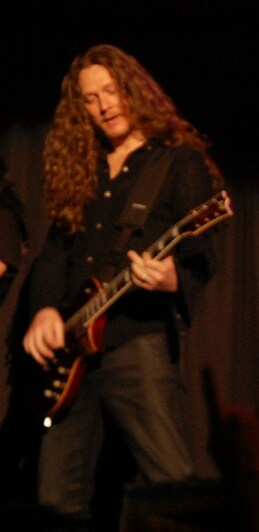
Since 1992, Wakeman has toured and recorded with his son Adam Wakeman on occasion

Wakeman continued with his solo career in parallel with his band engagements. In 1990, he revived his English Rock Ensemble with Holt, Fernandez, and bassist David Paton for a European tour. The following year, he recorded a new rock score for a colourised re-release of the silent film The Phantom of the Opera, featuring Chrissie Hammond on vocals; it was released as Phantom Power in 1991. He subsequently embarked on two UK tours supporting his The Classical Connection album series, performing alongside Paton in a stripped-back stage production.

During the first half of the 1990s, Wakeman regularly performed and released music in aid of ASSIST, a California-based Christian organisation founded by journalist Dan Wooding, the author of Wakeman's first biography. The pair reconnected in 1989, and their first venture was In the Beginning, an album of atmospheric music featuring Biblical readings spoken by Wakeman's then-wife Nina Carter. Wakeman donated the entire proceeds from the album to the charity. In 1994, Wakeman completed the Simply Acoustic Tour, a series of solo piano concerts across the US in aid of ASSIST. Live recordings from these performances in Virginia and the Calvary Chapel in Costa Mesa, California—the latter attended by an audience of 8,000—were compiled and released as The Piano Album in 1995. Wakeman formed Hope Records specifically to distribute this new Christian material, allocating all subsequent royalty payments to fund the production of future albums for the label.

In October 1992, Wakeman embarked on a world tour leading a four-piece group of Tony Fernandez, bassist Alan Thomson, and his son Adam Wakeman on additional keyboards. The tour, which lasted until 1994, was organised because Wakeman wished to utilise a second keyboardist to provide greater performance flexibility on stage. The venture coincided with the release of Wakeman with Wakeman (1992), an album of keyboard compositions written and performed by the father and son. The duo subsequently released No Expense Spared (1993), Romance of the Victorian Age (1994), and Vignettes (1996) on President Records.

In 1993, Wakeman's finances suffered a severe setback when the Inland Revenue demanded a payment of nearly £70,000 for interest charges and unpaid penalties tracking back six fiscal years. To resolve the debt, Wakeman was forced into a devastating financial compromise. Assisted by manager Brian Lane's office and Yes's accountants, he signed away the publishing rights and future income of his entire back catalogue. He later reflected: "Twenty-two years' work had vanished in the three seconds it had taken to sign my name." Despite this crisis, 1993 marked a permanent turning point in his television broadcasting career following a guest appearance on the late-night talk show Danny Baker After All. His humorous anecdotal storytelling on the show—specifically a segment detailing his arrest in Moscow for attempting to smuggle a KGB uniform out of the Soviet Union—impressed network producers, leading to regular mainstream media bookings.

Wakeman diversified into avant-garde live entertainment in mid-1995 by collaborating with Phillip Gandey's contemporary family attraction, Cirque Surreal. He composed and recorded an original instrumental score designed to dynamically enhance the show's various characters. Following an initial premiere at the Brighton Festival, Wakeman performed the music live alongside his band at subsequent stagings, including the Cheltenham Festival. Around the same time, Wakeman scored the soundtracks for the spy thriller film Bullet to Beijing (1995) and its sequel Midnight in Saint Petersburg (1996), both starring Michael Caine and Jason Connery. He also returned briefly to high-profile heavy rock session work, playing the Mellotron on the tracks "Perry Mason" and "I Just Want You" for Ozzy Osbourne's platinum-certified album Ozzmosis (1995).

In 1995, Wakeman agreed to rejoin Yes for a fourth tenure, which successfully reunited the band's "classic" 1970s lineup for the first time since 1979. The reformation produced a series of live concerts and new studio recordings that were subsequently compiled and released on Keys to Ascension (1996) and Keys to Ascension 2 (1997). Concurrently, Wakeman continued to expand his sacred music portfolio. In March 1997, he staged the North American premiere of The New Gospels for a five-date church tour to benefit ASSIST. Originally conceived as a shorter piece, the work had been substantially expanded into a full two-hour oratorio featuring a 30-piece choir.

Citing deep coordination issues and scheduling conflicts between various members' individual management teams, Wakeman abruptly left Yes in May 1997 before the group could embark on their scheduled world tour. Following his departure, his media presence expanded significantly; in June 1997, he was appointed the main televised host for the stand-up comedy series Live at Jongleurs. Later that year, his 20-minute choral piece Noah—scored specifically for the English Chamber Choir—premiered in London. Wakeman later revived and performed Noah with the choir in 2012 during a Merry England-themed concert series staged at St Martin-in-the-Fields, which also featured him filming his fourth broadcast episode of the BBC religious program Songs of Praise.

=== 1998–2008: Career resurgence, English Rock Ensemble revival, and final Yes tenure ===
In 1998, Wakeman began work on Return to the Centre of the Earth, a sequel album to commemorate the 25th anniversary of Journey to the Centre of the Earth. He originally conceived the project in 1991 during a tour of Italy, leading to initial talks with Atlantic Records that year regarding a re-recording of the original album with modern equipment; however, the label rejected the proposal. The concept was revived in 1996 after Wakeman received funding offers from three separate record companies eager to back a new symphonic rock epic. Following an agreement with EMI Classics, a storyline tracking three unnamed travellers following the original subterranean route was finalised. Recording commenced in 1998 utilising his core band alongside the London Symphony Orchestra, the English Chamber Choir, and actor Patrick Stewart as narrator, with additional guest performances from various musicians, including Trevor Rabin, Ozzy Osbourne, and Bonnie Tyler. Released in 1999, the album reached number 34 on the UK Albums Chart, marking Wakeman's first charting record in 12 years. Production was temporarily disrupted after Wakeman was hospitalised with a life-threatening illness. In December 1998, his career was celebrated when he was featured on an episode of the biographical television show This Is Your Life.

Spurred by a resurgence of interest in progressive rock across South America, Wakeman accepted an invitation to revive his English Rock Ensemble for a tour there in September 2000. The reformed line-up featured drummer Tony Fernandez, vocalist Damian Wilson, his son Adam Wakeman on additional keyboards, guitarist Ant Glynne, and bassist Lee Pomeroy. Wakeman was highly satisfied with the band's performances, assessing his own keyboard playing as his "best in a long time." The ensemble returned for further South American legs in April 2001, followed by a series of European concerts. Later that year, collaborative sessions were discussed with keyboardist Keith Emerson for a joint project, though the plans were ultimately shelved. In a departure from conventional concert work, Wakeman made his pantomime debut during the 2001 Christmas season, starring as Abanazar in a production of Aladdin at the Hall for Cornwall in Truro. He also made a minor cameo appearance as a hospital patient in the 2002 independent horror thriller film Alone. In 2003, Wakeman joined the cast of the BBC comedy television series Grumpy Old Men, remaining a fixture on the show until its conclusion in 2006. The series significantly enhanced his British public profile, leading to regular bookings on the lucrative corporate after-dinner speaking circuit.

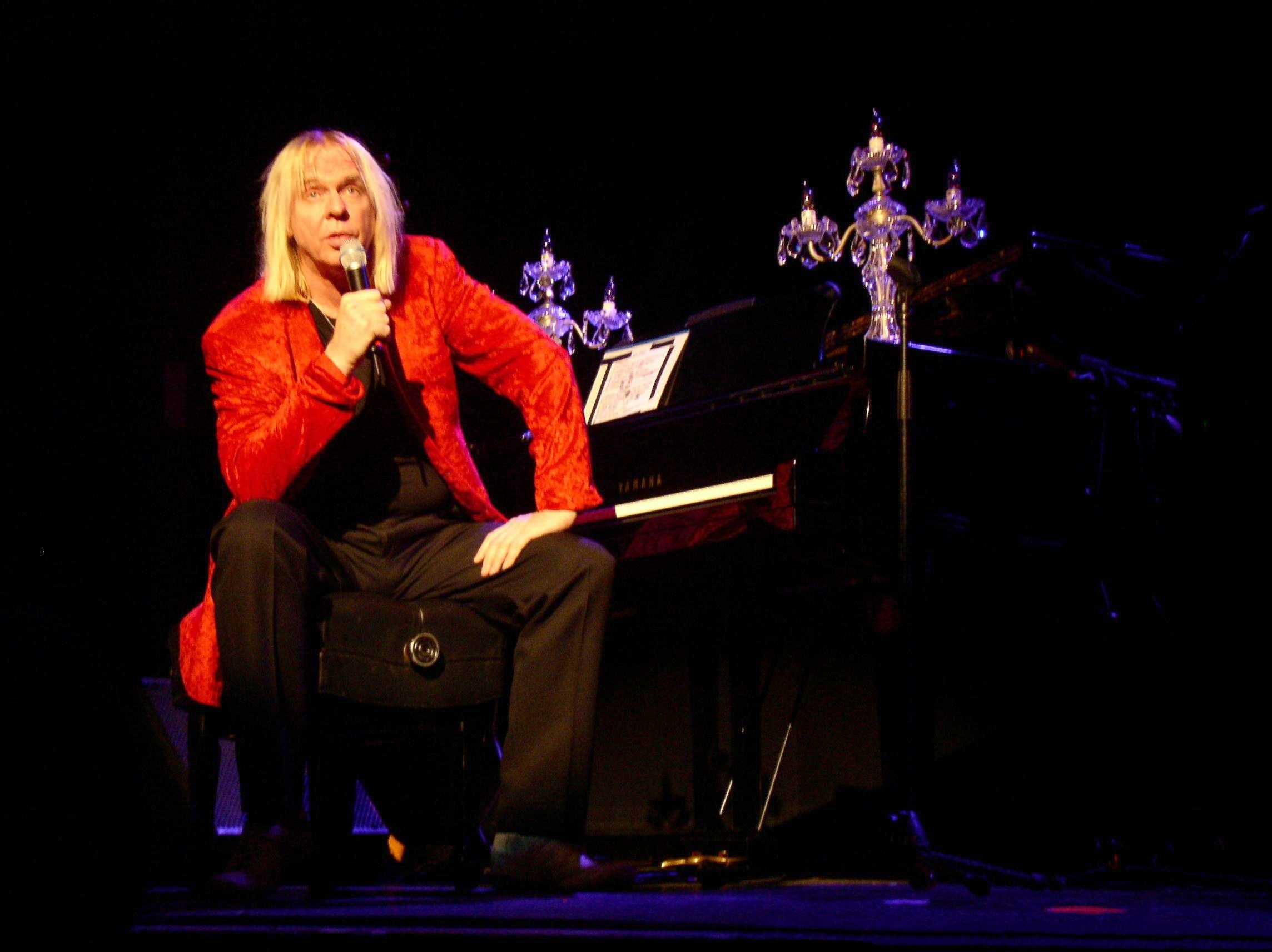
Wakeman at a solo piano show in 2003

In April 2002, Wakeman rejoined Yes for the fifth and final tenure, later noting that finalising the necessary paperwork took eight months. The band embarked on an extensive worldwide itinerary, completing the Full Circle Tour and subsequent 35th Anniversary Tours between 2002 and 2004. Wakeman highly praised the group's musical form during this period, stating: "It was far and away the best the band had ever been ... there was no staleness, there was a lot of freshness." Following the conclusion of the 2004 tour, Yes entered a four-year hiatus. During this window, Wakeman retired from large-scale international touring due to ongoing health problems. When the band regrouped in 2008, his son Oliver Wakeman replaced him on keyboards.

In April 2005, Wakeman and his backing band performed three concerts in Havana, Cuba, highlighted by an open-air event attended by an estimated 10,000 people. The dates were arranged to support a humanitarian charity aiding a local children's cancer hospital. The first two performances were filmed and released as the concert video Made in Cuba, with all proceeds directly allocated to the medical facility. Cuban leader Fidel Castro met with Wakeman personally to express gratitude for his humanitarian efforts. The trip drew external political criticism, which deeply distressed Wakeman and briefly prompted him to consider retiring from live performance altogether. He subsequently issued a clarification on his website, emphasizing that the trip was humanitarian rather than political. Wakeman later revealed that during their meeting, Castro had gifted him earth taken from the gravesite of Che Guevara.

In June 2006, Wakeman completed a solo piano tour across the US. This was followed by a staging of Return to the Centre of the Earth in Quebec, Canada, utilising his core group alongside a full orchestra and choir. The production featured Jon Anderson as a special guest vocalist, which directly inspired the two musicians to tour the UK together as an acoustic duo as Anderson/Wakeman. Turning to film work, Wakeman composed the score for the 2007 documentary film In Search of the Great Beast 666, which explored the life of occultist Aleister Crowley. He toured the UK later that year with a new stage production titled The Grumpy Old Picture Show. Inspired by his appearances on Grumpy Old Men, the show integrated live keyboard performances and spoken-word anecdotes with pre-recorded visual sketches and vintage photographs. The initial 14-date run proved highly successful, prompting Wakeman to complete an additional 24 dates the following year.

=== 2009–present: Revisiting classic albums and collaborative projects ===
In May 2009, Wakeman participated in the 500th anniversary celebrations of Henry VIII's accession by performing his debut solo album, The Six Wives of Henry VIII, in its entirety at Hampton Court Palace for two nights with his backing band, orchestra, and choir. The event fulfilled a performance request he had originally made and been denied in 1973. The concerts were subsequently released as a live CD and DVD featuring narration by Brian Blessed. Following this event, he reunited with former Yes bandmate Jon Anderson in 2010 to record The Living Tree as Anderson/Wakeman, , which they supported with tours across the UK and North America in 2010 and 2011. During this period, Wakeman also collaborated with Deep Purple keyboardist Jon Lord for a performance at the Royal Albert Hall in aid of the Sunflower Jam charity. Although the duo planned to record a collaborative studio album, the project was curtailed by Lord's cancer diagnosis and subsequent death in 2012; their charity set remained Lord's final live appearance. In July 2011, Wakeman briefly rejoined Strawbs during their acoustic summer tour, making a guest appearance at their AbbeyFest concert.

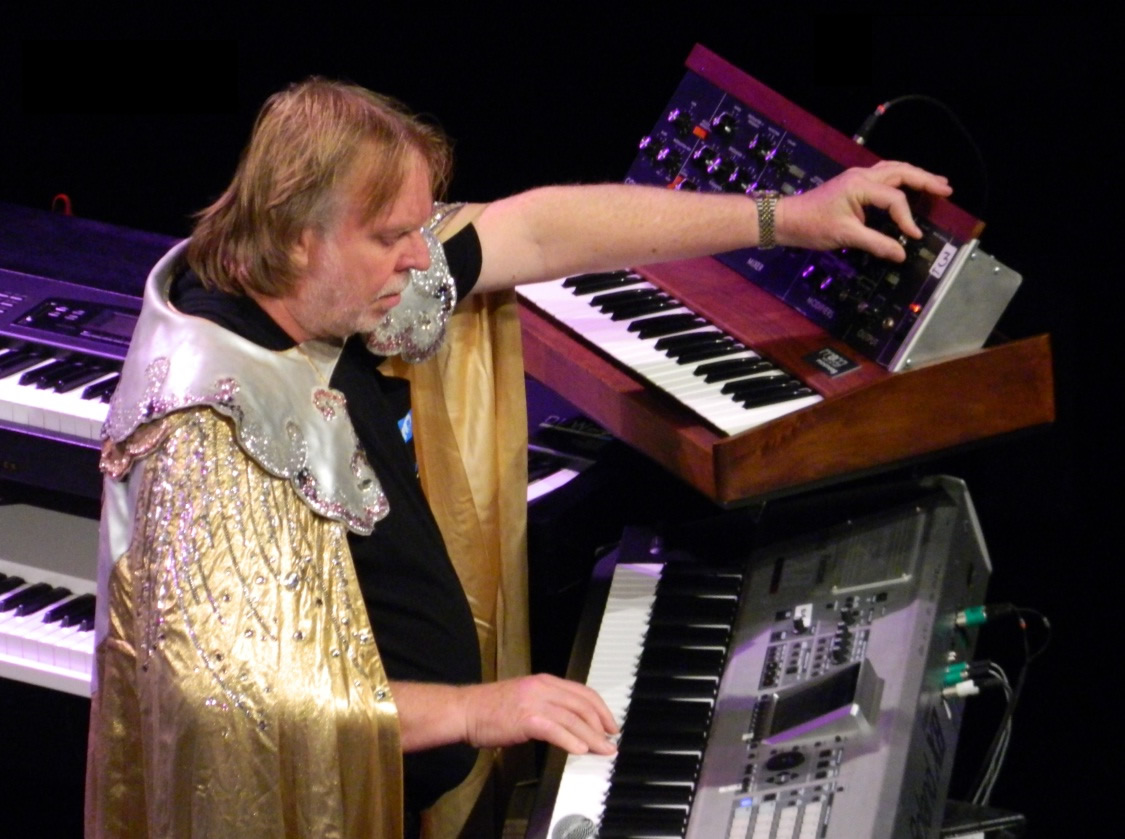
Wakeman performing in 2012

The discovery of a long-lost conductor's score in 2009 prompted Wakeman to record an expanded version of Journey to the Centre of the Earth in 2012. Originally truncated to fit the constraints of a single vinyl LP, the re-recorded version spanned 54 minutes and featured the English Rock Ensemble alongside original vocalist Ashley Holt, second vocalist Hayley Sanderson, the Orion Orchestra, and narration by Peter Egan. To commemorate the original album's 40th anniversary, Wakeman performed this expanded edition on a 14-date UK tour in 2014. This undertaking served as the catalyst for a similar overhaul of The Myths and Legends of King Arthur and the Knights of the Round Table. Released in June 2016, this 88-minute version, narrated by Ian Lavender, marked Wakeman's first studio album financed through direct-to-fan crowdfunding. He premiered the work live on its release day at the Stone Free Festival at London's O2 Arena.

In June 2013, Wakeman participated in the Medieval Mystery Play Festival with performances at Blackfriars Priory—where he was joined by his children Oliver, Adam, and Jemma—and the Cheltenham Centaur. The latter featured new arrangements of his 1970s conceptual trilogy performed with the English Rock Ensemble and the Cheltenham Symphony Orchestra. Although he had planned to stage a massive production of King Arthur at Kingsholm Stadium that same year, the event was eventually cancelled. Following a 10-show piano residency at the Edinburgh Festival Fringe in 2013, he announced a curated "Wakemanfest" event at the Gliderdrome in Boston, Lincolnshire for October 2015. However, both the festival and a subsequent Scandinavian tour were postponed after Wakeman suffered an undisclosed health scare. Upon his recovery, he spent much of 2016 to 2018 touring globally alongside former Yes bandmates Jon Anderson and Trevor Rabin under the moniker Yes Featuring Jon Anderson, Trevor Rabin, Rick Wakeman, performing material spanning different eras of the band's history..

A significant turning point in Wakeman's solo career occurred in January 2016 following the death of his long-time friend and collaborator David Bowie. His live piano tribute to "Life on Mars?" on BBC Radio 2 received widespread viral acclaim, prompting Wakeman to record and release it as a charity single to benefit Macmillan Cancer Support. The public reception inspired a successful trilogy of solo piano studio albums: Piano Portraits (2017), Piano Odyssey (2018), and Christmas Portraits (2019). The first of these reached No. 6 in the UK, marking his highest charting position since 1975 and his first silver-certified album in the UK since 1977. This commercial resurgence culminated in late 2019 when he embarked on his first solo concert tour of the US in thirteen years.

In June 2020, Wakeman returned to progressive rock with The Red Planet, an instrumental rock concept album inspired by Mars that featured a revived line-up of the English Rock Ensemble. He followed this in March 2023 with A Gallery of the Imagination, a stylistically diverse collection of tracks featuring vocal contributions from Sanderson. During this period, he staged a high-profile retrospective concert series at the London Palladium in February 2023, performing The Six Wives of Henry VIII, Journey to the Centre of the Earth, and King Arthur in their entirety alongside a selection of Yes material; the event was captured and compiled as a live box set the following year.

Following a 2024 UK tour dedicated to his Journey and Yes catalogues, Wakeman embarked on what was billed as his final solo piano tours of North America and Europe. A centrepiece of these performances was "Yessonata", a 30-minute piano composition interpolating various themes and melodies from his tenure with Yes. A 20-minute studio version of the piece was later paired with a similar suite based on themes from King Arthur for a standalone album release. In 2024, Wakeman also performed at the annual Starmus Festival, debuting an original composition for piano and orchestra written as a tribute to primatologist and climate campaigner Jane Goodall. Following a period of recuperation from surgery, Wakeman completed a North American tour in March 2026 alongside his eldest son Oliver Wakeman on additional keyboards for the first time, billed as Wakeman and Son. A 17-date UK tour with the English Rock Ensemble, titled The Wizard of Prog – Ultimate Highlights Tour, is scheduled for early 2027.

== Instruments ==
By the end of 1972, Wakeman's typical keyboard setup included piano, electric piano, Mellotron, Hammond organ, and Minimoog synthesizer, and he had played a pipe organ and harpsichord on record. He went on to use many later models of synthesizers including the Polymoog and the short-lived Birotron, which he helped fund in its development. Because of the advent of digital keyboards at that time, and expensive components used in the instruments' manufacture, the Birotron was never a commercial or technical success and only 35 were produced. In recent years, Wakeman has used various Korg models, a Yamaha Montage, and the Memotron, a digital version of the original Mellotron.

An urban legend claims that Wakeman got so frustrated with one Mellotron that he poured petrol on it and set fire to it, which he said in 2010 was only "semi-true", and had become an exaggerated story over time. He clarified that some were so far beyond repair they were taken apart and burnt, but he kept the frames. A double Mellotron that he had made was stolen and reappeared in America.

In addition to keyboards, Wakeman still owns the soprano saxophone that he used at the Royal College of Music, and can play some rhythm and bass guitar.

== Recognition and influence ==
In his foreword for Wakeman's 1979 biography, Elton John named The Six Wives of Henry VIII as one of his favourite albums. He noted Wakeman's "brilliant" technique and wrote that his "mastery of electronic instruments only adds to his abilities". In 2011, MusicRadar included Wakeman among "The 27 greatest keyboard players of all time". In 2019, readers of Prog voted him the second greatest progressive rock keyboard player, with the magazine stating, "Wakeman's time with Yes helped define prog as we know it, being filled with timeless brilliance [...] The man's style is fluent, and underlines a love of many genres, all cohesively brought into focus." In 2024, Neil McCormick of The Daily Telegraph ranked him as the second greatest keyboard player of all time.

Keyboardists who have cited Wakeman as an influence included Dave Greenfield of the Stranglers and Mark Kelly of Marillion, who cited Wakeman as his primary influence.

== Personal life ==
=== Family ===
Wakeman has been married four times and has six children. In March 1970, at the age of 20, he married Rosaline Woolford. They had two sons, Oliver and Adam. Their marriage became strained by the end of 1976, as Wakeman was advised to take a year out of the country for tax purposes and was to spend several months recording with Yes in Switzerland. Woolford was reluctant to move with the family, and for this and other reasons, filed for divorce in 1977. In later life Wakeman said the marriage was a mistake for both of them as they were too young and were "not ready for what the musical world was about to throw at me." He began a relationship with Swiss-born Danielle Corminboeuf, a secretary at Mountain Studios in Montreux, while recording with Yes at the same studio. They married in January 1980 in Barbados. They had one son, before they split after Wakeman returned home from his 1981 world tour "with my suitcase on the doorstep and Danielle in Belgium with a nineteen-year-old catering student". Their divorce was finalised in 1984. In 1981, Wakeman met former Page 3 model Nina Carter and had a daughter, before they married in November 1984 and had a son. The couple separated in 2000 and finalised their divorce in 2004. Wakeman left their home on the Isle of Man and for a period lived in hotels.

In the early 2000s, Wakeman had a relationship with Italian artist Alina Bencini who produced artwork for his albums released during this time. In 2004, Wakeman revealed that he had had an extramarital affair with American-born designer Denise Gandrup, who first met Wakeman in 1972 and made several of his capes. After they split in 1981, they reconnected in 1985 and had one daughter. Wakeman felt it best to keep the relationship and child secret to protect his family, but continued to financially support his daughter. As of 2023, Wakeman has thirteen grandchildren.

In December 2011, Wakeman married journalist Rachel Kaufman, who is 25 years his junior. The pair met in 2004 when Kaufman conducted a press interview with him, and were engaged in 2007. Wakeman moved from Norfolk to Suffolk in 2019, and lives with his wife by the Shotley Peninsula.

=== Health ===
Wakeman has faced a number of health issues. In his twenties he had three heart attacks due to smoking and drinking heavily and overworking. The first two were minor and he was told they may have gone unnoticed. The third occurred soon after his headline performance at the Crystal Palace Park in July 1974, when he was 25. Wakeman stopped smoking in 1979, but continued to drink and recalled "wild" nights with Keith Moon, Vivian Stanshall, and Rick Parfitt.

In September 1984, Wakeman was fined £155 and banned from driving for one year for speeding and being over the drink drive limit. On 8 August 1985, Wakeman became teetotal after he fell ill during an Australian tour. He flew home where a doctor revealed he had alcoholic hepatitis, signs of cirrhosis and organ failure, and said he had six months to live if he continued to drink. In 1998, Wakeman collapsed on a golf course and was rushed to hospital, where he was diagnosed with double pneumonia, pleurisy, high blood pressure, and showed signs of Legionnaires' disease. He was placed in an induced coma, and at one point his doctors gave him 24 hours to live. Wakeman has had a vasectomy.

In 2016 Wakeman announced he had type-2 diabetes. In 2023, he said his playing was affected by macular degeneration in his left eye, which he treats with monthly injections. He also has arthritis in his hands, legs and feet, for which he wears half gloves while performing. In 2025, Wakeman had surgery on his spine and brain to treat his normal pressure hydrocephalus.

Wakeman has never used drugs and believes that had he taken them he would have done so to excess and died.

=== Other activities ===
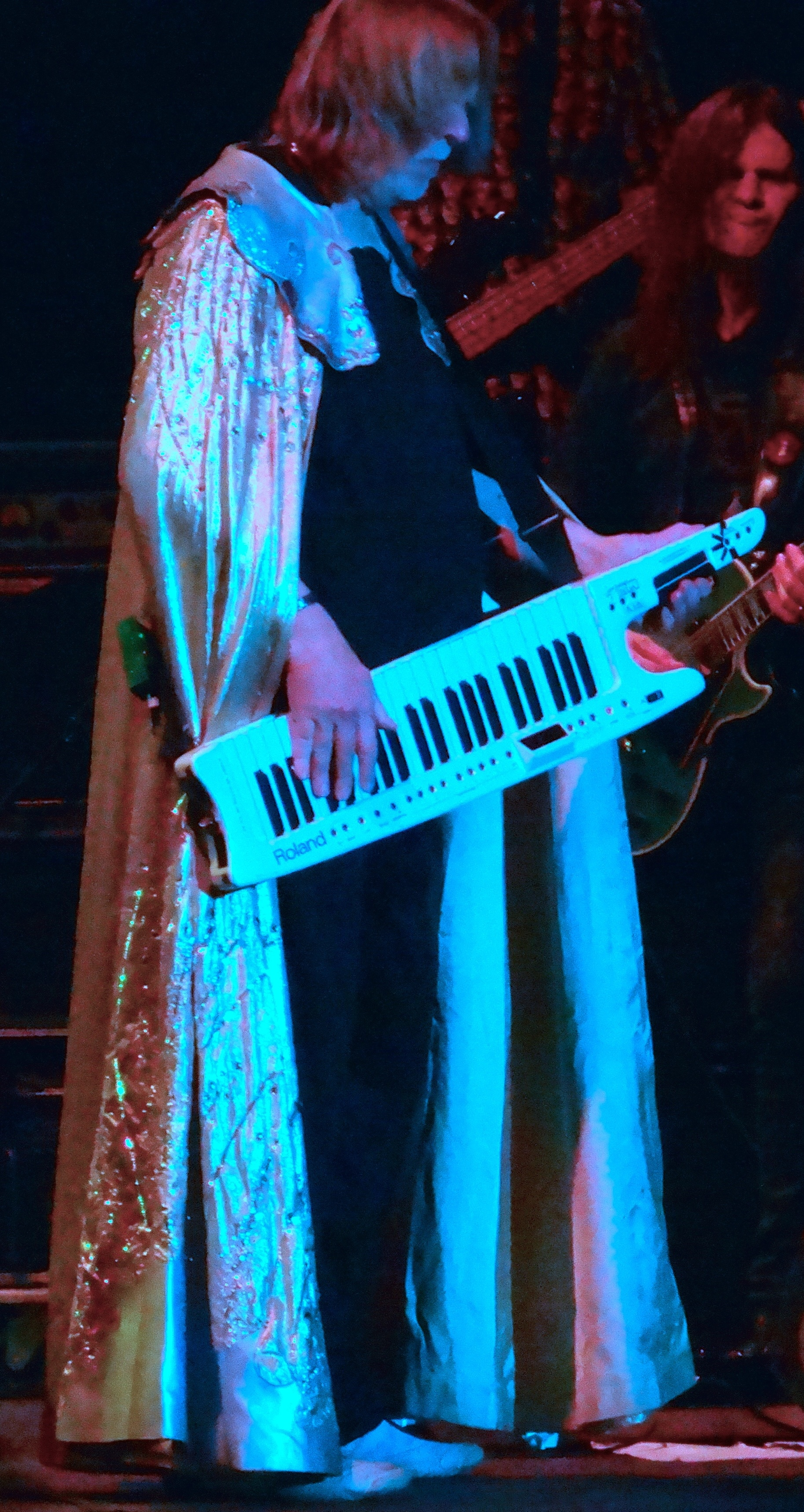
Wakeman performing in one of his capes, 2014

In the 1970s, Wakeman met Queen Elizabeth the Queen Mother and bought Tropical Saint, a racehorse that belonged to her. After it died, he bought Balinloning, a small horse that he had in care for a year and entered in races.

In 1977, Wakeman was one of several musicians, along with Peter Frampton, Mick Jagger, and Paul Simon, who were part of the ownership group of the Philadelphia Fury, a new football team to compete in the North American Soccer League. The team split in 1980. Wakeman is a supporter of Brentford F.C. and in 1979, was a director of the team for one year. In 1983, he became chairman of Camberley Town F.C. while he was living there. He quit in 1987 due to his busy work schedule, but remained active as an honorary vice-president. Wakeman is also a supporter of Manchester City F.C.

In 1977, media reports identified Wakeman as one of several artists at A&M Records who allegedly threatened to leave if it signed the controversial punk band the Sex Pistols. Wakeman denied the claims, calling it a publicity stunt by A&M to justify terminating the band's contract, and clarified that he was instrumental in securing a deal for the American punk group the Tubes; upon seeing them perform, Wakeman recommended them to George Daly, advising him to contact A&M executive Kip Cohen, who subsequently signed them to A&M.

In a 2010 interview, Wakeman was critical of Wikipedia, saying it has too many inaccuracies and mistakes, and that he would love to see it "closed down".

In June 2017, he was the castaway for the BBC Radio 4 programme Desert Island Discs. His favourite piece was Giuseppe Verdi's Anvil Chorus and his book choice was Principles of Orchestration by Nikolai Rimsky-Korsakov, which his orchestration professor at the Royal College had introduced to him.

Wakeman's agent for TV and media work is entertainer Roger De Courcey, best known for performing with his puppet Nookie Bear.

Wakeman has been a supporter of the Conservative Party, saying he was "unique in [Yes] as a card-carrying Conservative".

Wakeman had a renewal of his Christian faith which began at around the time of his 1984 marriage to Carter.

In the 1990s, Wakeman bought a house in Los Cristianos, Tenerife.

In 1993, Wakeman was invited to play the piano at the inauguration of US President Bill Clinton. He declined due to unavailability.

In 1996, Wakeman was involved in a plane crash while landing at Derry, Northern Ireland. The eight-seater Manx Airlines plane lost power and its undercarriage collapsed, causing the plane to land on its rear wheel and the front crashing onto the tarmac, with the propellers and engine breaking off. After passing a medical check he played at an awards ceremony dinner for the same airline.

In 2002, Wakeman crashed into a stationary abandoned car while driving at around 65 mph at night on the M40 motorway. Despite bleeding in his mouth, he refused hospital treatment as Yes were due to start a North American tour in a couple of days. He remembered "nearly crying with agony on stage" during the first week.

In September 2005, Wakeman began to host a Saturday morning radio show on Planet Rock called Rick's Place, that went on to feature David Jensen as co-host. The show ended in December 2010 after over 200 original episodes. Several months before its cancellation, Wakeman began a pre-recorded Saturday night show on Dublin-based Radio Nova with his friend David Hoffmann which lasted through 2012. In 2009, Wakeman recorded an online interview series called Face to Face with various musicians. In 2020, he launched Rick's Plaice, a subscription-based video series based on the format of his former Planet Rock show. The series lasted two seasons.

==== Freemasonry ====
In 2007, Wakeman became a Freemason, joining the Chelsea Lodge No. 3098 which is made up of entertainers. His father was a member of the Brent Valley Lodge No. 3940, and the support that Wakeman and his mother received from his friends at the Lodge following his death was a catalyst for Wakeman to learn more about Freemasonry. In 2019, Wakeman was elected as an honorary member of his late father's Lodge. In 2011, Wakeman joined the Knights Templar fraternity, and is also a member of the Vaudeville Lodge. In 2014 he was installed as the 110th Worshipful Master of the Chelsea Lodge. He was and elected as the 125th King Rat in the showbusiness fraternity and charity organisation, the Grand Order of Water Rats. Wakeman was the first person to hold both titles. He hosted the Grumpy Old Rockstar's Chelsea Lodge Ladies Festival in the following year. Wakeman appears in his Masonic apron in the 2017 documentary series Inside the Freemasons.

==== Charity work and patronage ====
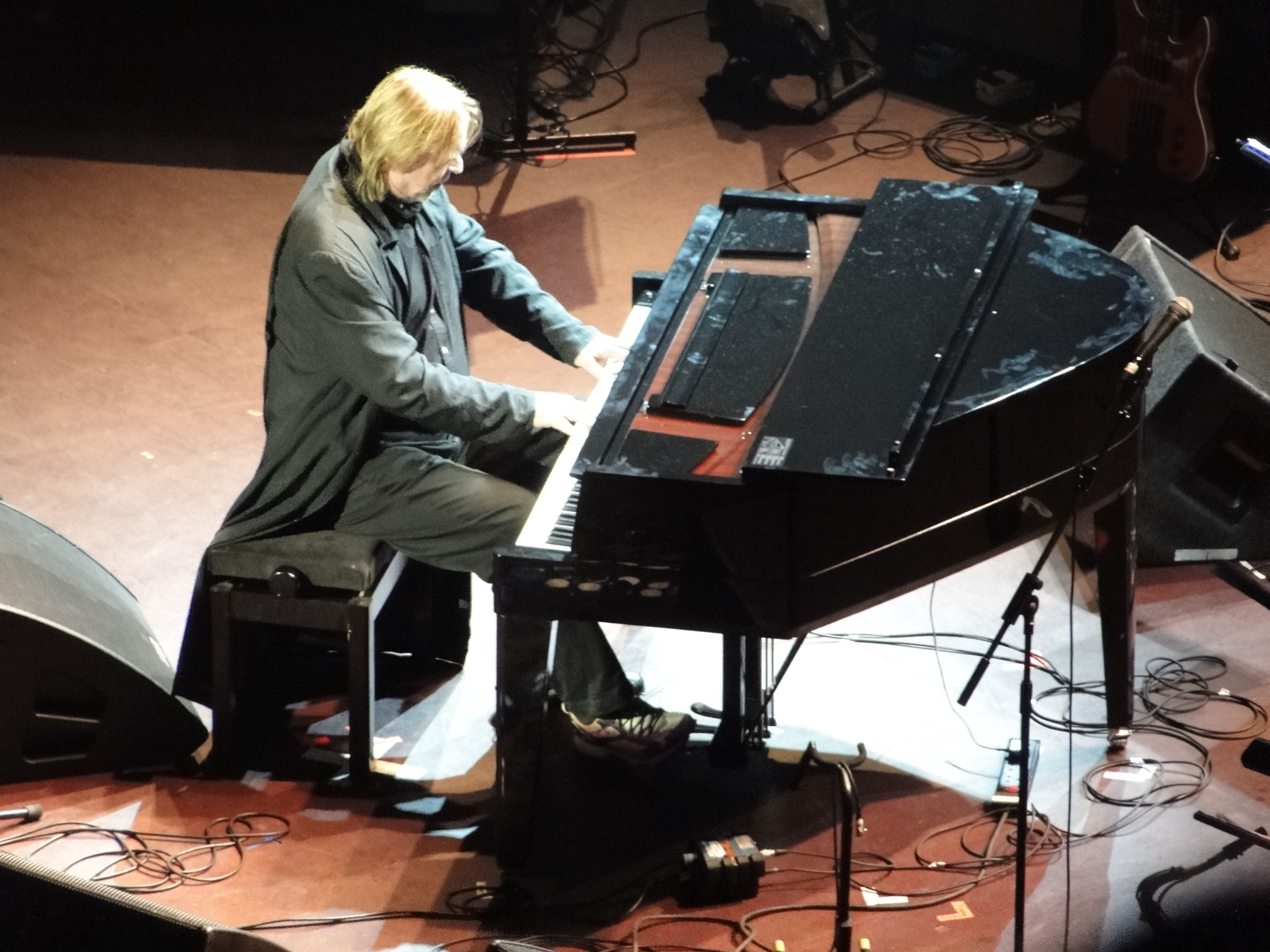
Wakeman performing at the Royal Albert Hall in aid of the Performing Right Society for Music Members' Benevolent Fund in 2009

In 1988, Wakeman was elected into the Lord's Taverners cricket charity, and was chairman of the Isle of Man branch with his wife in the early 1990s. He took up golf in the 1980s after becoming teetotal, and has since taken part in many charity tournaments. From 1995 until at least 2012, the Rick Wakeman Celebrity Classic golf tournament took place at Burhill Golf Club in Surrey, raising funds in aid of the children's charity Sparks.

Wakeman is an honorary president of the Classic Rock Society, formed in Rotherham in 1991. In 2009, he became a patron of Tech Music School. He was one of the board of directors of the Performing Artists' Media Rights Association (PAMRA), a non-profit organisation committed to promoting musicians' rights and income.

Wakeman is a patron and active supporter of several animal welfare charities, including Friends of the Animals and Saving Strays. In 2017, he was made an ambassador to Animals Asia Foundation, of which he has supported since 2013.

==== Awards and honours ====
In October 1997, Wakeman received a Golden Badge Award from the British Academy of Songwriters, Composers and Authors (BASCA), given for outstanding contributions to the British music and entertainment industry.

In 2008, Wakeman gave a class to students of the London College of Music and later that year, received an honorary professorship from the college for his contributions to music. In 2010, Wakeman was awarded the Spirit of Prog Award at the annual Classic Rock Roll of Honour Awards. In 2012, Wakeman received an honorary fellowship of the Royal College of Music in a ceremony presented by HRH The Prince of Wales, the college's president. In 2022, he received the Musicians' Company Honorary Fellowship at the Royal College.

Wakeman was appointed Commander of the Order of the British Empire (CBE) in the 2021 Birthday Honours for services to music and broadcasting. He is a Freeman of the City of London, and a liveryman of the Worshipful Company of Glovers.

== Band members ==
Vocals
- Ashley Holt (1974–2019)
- Gary Pickford-Hopkins (1974–1975)
- Cori Josias (1981)
- Gordon Neville (1985)
- Ramon Remedios (1987–2001)
- Chrissie Hammond (1991–1998)
- Damian Wilson (2000–2003)
- Hayley Sanderson (2012–present)
- Mollie Marriott (2024–present)
- Jessie Smith (2025–present)
- Sara Davey (2025–present; backing)
- Jo Goldsmith-Eteson (2025–present; backing)
- Jo Marshall (2025–present; backing)

Guitar

- Geoffrey Crampton (1974–1975)
- John Dunsterville (1975–1976)
- Tim Stone (1980–1981)
- Rick Fenn (1985)
- Dave "D'Zal" Martin (1989)
- Fraser Thorneycroft-Smith (1992–1999)
- Ant Glynne (2000–2003)
- Dave Colquhoun (2002, 2005–present)

Bass

- Roger Newell (1974–1976)
- Steve Barnacle (1980–1981)
- Chas Cronk (1985)
- David Paton (1987–1996)
- Alan Thomson (1992–1994)
- Lee Pomeroy (2000–present)

Drums

- Barney James (1974–1975)
- Tony Fernandez (1975–2022)
- Ash Soan (2005, 2020)
- Adam Falkner (2022–present)

Brass

- Martyn Shields (1975–1976, trombone)
- Reg Brooks (1975–1976, trumpet)

Percussion

- John Hodgson (1974–1975)

Keyboards

- Adam Wakeman (1992–present)

Narration

- Terry Taplin (1974–1975)
- Robert Powell (1980s)
- Ian Lavender
- Peter Egan

== Discography ==
Selected solo releases

- Piano Vibrations (1971)
- The Six Wives of Henry VIII (1973)
- Journey to the Centre of the Earth (1974; live)
- The Myths and Legends of King Arthur and the Knights of the Round Table (1975)
- No Earthly Connection (1976)
- Rick Wakeman's Criminal Record (1977)
- Rhapsodies (1979)
- 1984 (1981)
- Cost of Living (1983)
- Silent Nights (1985)
- Country Airs (1986)
- Time Machine (1988)
- Sea Airs (1989)
- Phantom Power (1990)
- Night Airs (1990)
- Classic Tracks (1993)
- Rick Wakeman's Greatest Hits (1993)
- Light Up The Sky (1994; EP)
- The Seven Wonders of the World (1995)
- Return to the Centre of the Earth (1999)
- Piano Portraits (2017)
- Piano Odyssey (2018)
- Christmas Portraits (2019)
- The Red Planet (2020)
- A Gallery of the Imagination (2023)
- Yessonata (2024)
- Melancholia (2025)

Film scores

- Zee and Co. (1972)
- Lisztomania (1975)
- White Rock (1977)
- The Burning (1981)
- G'olé! (1983)
- She (1984)
- Crimes of Passion (1984)
- Creepshow 2 (1987; with Les Reed)
- Hero (1987)
- Phantom Power (1990)
- Bullet to Beijing (1995)
- Midnight in Saint Petersburg (1996)
- White Rock II (1999)
- Alone (2002)
- In Search of the Great Beast 666 (2007)

Video games and CD-ROM

- Microcosm (1993; Sega Mega Drive)
- Between Earth and the End of Time: The Worlds of Rodney Matthews (1996; CD-ROM)

== Bibliography ==
Books

- Say Yes! An Autobiography (1995)
- Grumpy Old Rockstar: and Other Wondrous Stories (2008)
- Further Adventures of a Grumpy Old Rockstar (2010)
- The Wizard of Prog: My Autobiography (due October 2026)

Songbooks

- Criminal Record
- Journey to the Centre of the Earth
- The Myths & Legends of King Arthur & the Knights of the Round Table
- The Six Wives of Henry VIII

== Notes and references ==
Notes

Sources

- Hedges, Dan (1982). Yes: An Authorized Biography. Sidgwick & Jackson. ISBN 978-0-283-98751-9.
- Morse, Tim (1996). Yesstories: "Yes" in Their Own Words. St Martin's Press. ISBN 978-0-312-14453-1.
- Wooding, Dan (1979). Rick Wakeman: The Caped Crusader. Granada Publishing Limited. ISBN 978-0-586-04853-5.
- Wakeman, Rick (1995). Say Yes! An Autobiography. Hodder & Stoughton. ISBN 978-0-340-62151-6.
- Welch, Chris (2008). Close to the Edge: The Story of Yes. Music Sales. ISBN 978-1-84772-132-7.
