= Time Machine (Rick Wakeman album) =

Studio album by Rick Wakeman
- Released: 25 July 1988
- Recorded: June – October 1987
- Studio: Studio House; Wraysbury, Berkshire
- Genre: Progressive rock
- Length: 51:25
- Label: President
- Producer: Rick Wakeman

Rick Wakeman chronology
The Gospels (1987)	Time Machine (1988)	A Suite of Gods (1988)

Time Machine is a progressive rock album released in July 1988 by Rick Wakeman. The album features guest vocals from Roy Wood.

== Track listing ==
All tracks composed and arranged by Rick Wakeman

No.	Title	Length
1.	"Custer's Last Stand"	4:04
2.	"Ocean City"	4:03
3.	"Angel Of Time"	4:50
4.	"Slaveman"	6:44
5.	"Ice"	4:52
6.	"Open Your Eyes"	9:57
7.	"Elizabethan Rock"	3:13
8.	"Make Me A Woman"	4:59
9.	"Rock Age"	8:38

The timings are for the CD release on which 5 tracks were extended versions from the LP edition. LP timings for the extended tracks are: "Angel of Time" (4.38), "Slaveman" (5.05), "Open Up Your Eyes" (5.48), "Make Me a Woman" (4.57) and "Rock Age" (7.48).

== Personnel ==
- Rick Wakeman - keyboards
- David Paton - bass
- Tony Fernandez - drums, percussion
- John Knightsbridge - guitar (4 & 9)
- Roy Wood - vocals (1)
- John Parr - vocals (2 & 9)
- Tracy Ackerman - vocals (3, 5 & 6)
- Ashley Holt - vocals (4 & 8)

Technical

- John Burns - engineer
