= Tony Fernandez (musician) =

English drummer

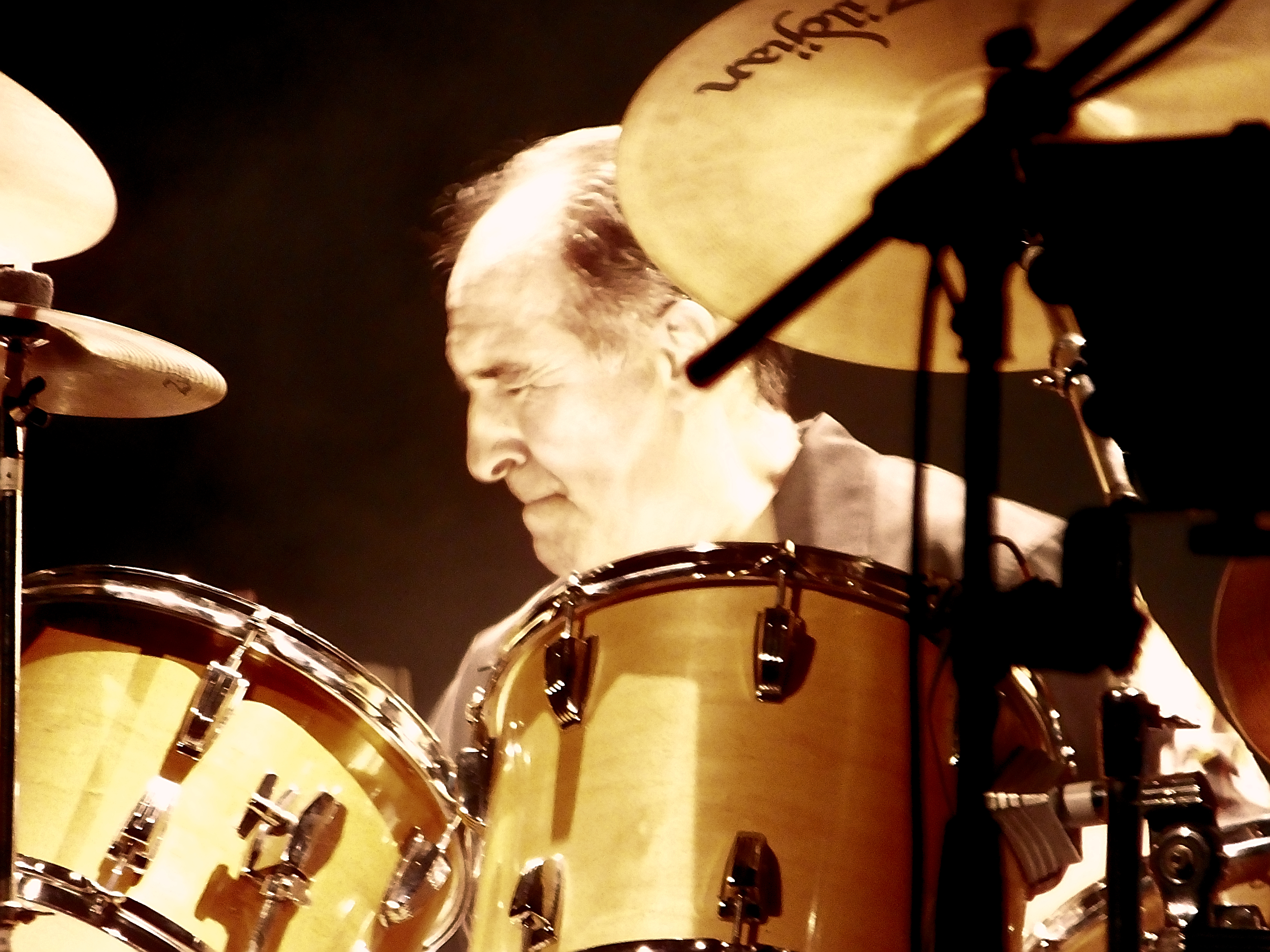
- Fernandez on stage on the Brazilian leg of the Journey to the Centre of the Earth Tour, in Belo Horizonte in 2014

Background information
- Born: 15 May 1946 (age 80)
- Origin: English/Italian
- Genres: Rock, progressive rock
- Occupation: Drummer
- Years active: ?–present

Tony Fernandez (born 28 June 1949) was an English drummer for the folk rock band Strawbs. He played the drums with keyboardist Rick Wakeman in his band The English Rock Ensemble from 1975 until 2022.

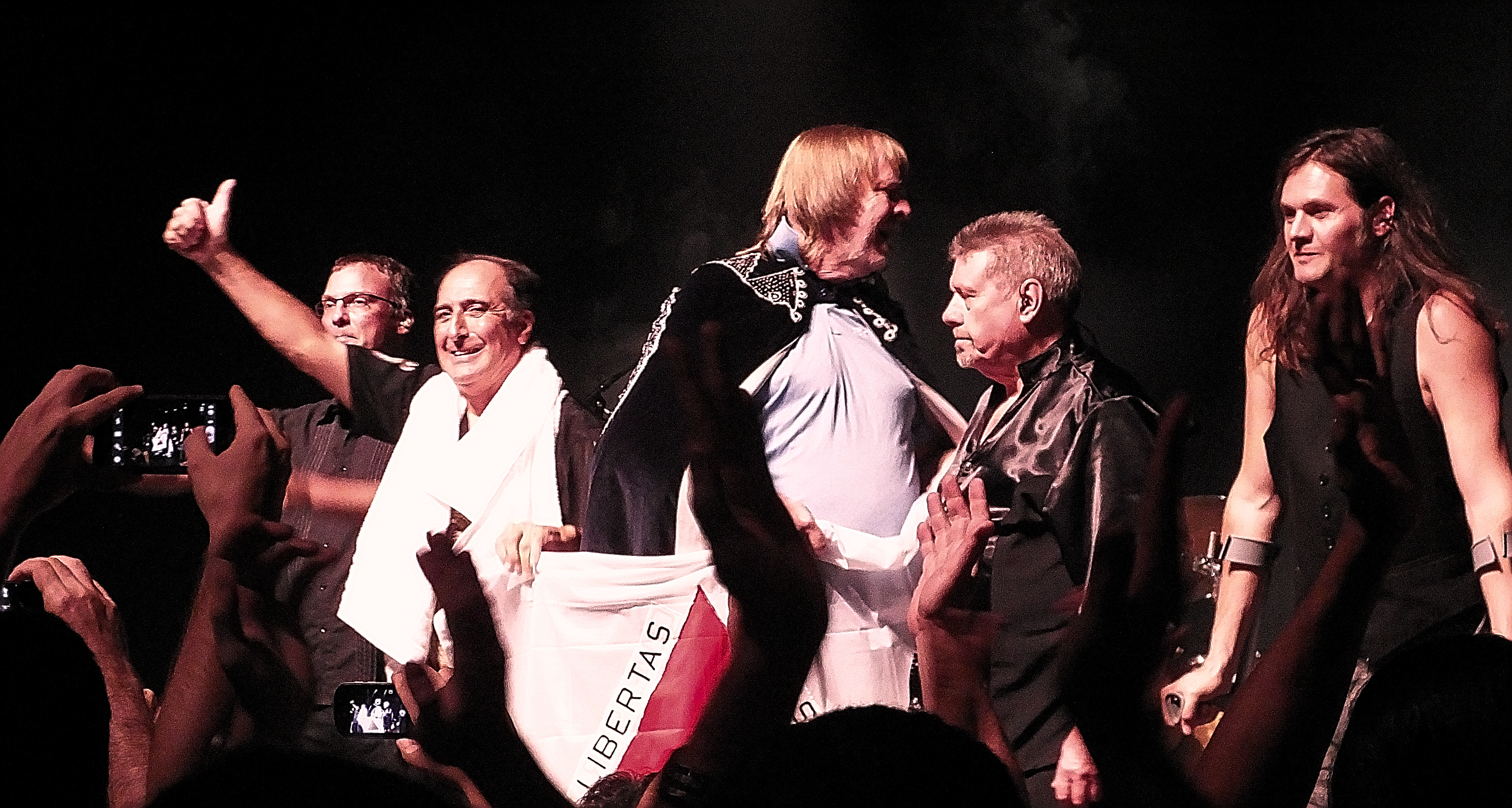
Fernandez on stage with Rick Wakeman and the English Rock Ensemble (2014)

== Discography ==
=== With Rick Wakeman ===
- No Earthly Connection (1976)
- White Rock (1977)
- 1984 (1981)
- Cost of Living (1983)
- G'ole! (1983)
- Crimes of Passion (1984)
- Glory Boys single (1984)
- Live at Hammersmith (1985)
- Time Machine (1988)
- A Suite of Gods (1988)
- Zodiaque (1988)
- Phantom Power (1990)
- African Bach (1991)
- No Expense Spared (1993)
- The Stage Collection (1994)
- Rick Wakeman's Greatest Hits (1994)
- Wakeman with Wakeman – The Official Bootleg (1994)
- Wakeman with Wakeman Live (1994)
- Live On The Test (released in 1994, recorded live in 1976)
- Rick Wakeman In Concert (released in 1995, recorded live in 1975)
- Almost Live in Europe (1995)
- The Private Collection (1995)
- Cirque Surreal (1995)
- Rock & Pop Legends (released in 1995, recorded live in 1989–91)
- Official Live Bootleg (released in 1999, recorded live in 1993)
- Out of the Blue (2001)
- Two Sides of Yes (2001)
- Two Sides of Yes – Volume 2 (2002)
- Out There (2003)
- Retro (2006)
- Retro 2 (2007)
- Live At The BBC (released in 2007, recorded live in 1976)
- In The Nick of Time (2012)
- Journey to the Centre of the Earth 2012 (2012)
