= Light Up the Sky (EP) =

EP by Rick Wakeman
- Released: May 1994
- Recorded: April 1994
- Studio: Bajonor Studios, Isle of Man
- Genre: Progressive rock
- Length: 19:06
- Label: President
- Producer: Rick Wakeman

Light Up The Sky is an EP by Rick Wakeman which contains four new songs.

Wakeman had been asked to write a song specifically for a huge firework display in Newcastle upon Tyne which he was to perform live. He wrote the song "Light Up the Sky" but because of poor ticket sales the event was cancelled. He then released this EP with three additional new songs.

"Light Up the Sky" and "The Bear" were later included on the 1999 compilation The Masters.

== Track listing ==
All songs written by Rick Wakeman.

No.	Title	Length
1.	"Light Up The Sky"	3:34
2.	"Simply Free"	3:52
3.	"Starflight"	5:40
4.	"The Bear"	5:57

== Personnel ==
- Rick Wakeman - keyboards
- Chrissie Hammond - lead vocals
- Adam Wakeman - organ
- Stuart Sawney - guitar and drum programming

=== Production ===
- Stuart Sawney - engineer
- Alan Hillary Events Ltd. - cover photograph
