= The Seven Wonders of the World (album) =

Studio album by Rick Wakeman
- Released: 29 May 1995
- Recorded: September 1994–May 1995
- Genre: Progressive rock, art rock, symphonic rock, new-age
- Length: 57:03
- Label: Pure Sounds (United States), President (UK)
- Producer: Stuart Sawney

Rick Wakeman chronology
New Gospels (1995)	The Seven Wonders of the World (1995)	Visions (1995)

Professional ratings
Review scores
Source	Rating
Allmusic	2.5/5 stars

The Seven Wonders of the World is a studio album by progressive rock artist and keyboardist Rick Wakeman, released in 1995. The album explores instrumentally the themes of each of the Seven Ancient Wonders of the World. Each track is introduced by Garfield Morgan, giving a short biography of each wonder before the instrumental track begins. The album is free of any bombastic attack, and each track has a refined tempo and instrumental progression that outlines each wonder's attributes.

== Idea ==
"The idea for an album with this title was first decided upon in the 1970s and indeed in my racehorse ownership days, there was indeed a race named after the title. The Seven Wonders of the World Handicap Hurdle, which sadly never happened on the day because of a frozen course!"

— Rick Wakeman

== Album artwork ==
The artwork is made to look like a vintage painting of one of the wonders, most likely the Statue of Zeus. "Rick Wakeman" and "The Seven Wonders of the World" are written in the font Papyrus.

== Track listing ==
All music is composed by Rick Wakeman.

The Seven Wonders of the World
No.	Title	Length
1.	"The Pharos of Alexandria: narration"	0:43
2.	"The Pharos of Alexandria"	9:40
3.	"The Colossus of Rhodes: narration"	0:43
4.	"The Colossus of Rhodes"	7:04
5.	"The Pyramids of Egypt: narration"	0:38
6.	"The Pyramids of Egypt"	6:30
7.	"The Hanging Gardens of Babylon: narration"	0:53
8.	"The Hanging Gardens of Babylon"	5:10
9.	"The Temple of Artemis: narration"	0:58
10.	"The Temple of Artemis"	6:27
11.	"The Statue of Zeus: narration"	0:47
12.	"The Statue of Zeus"	5:36
13.	"The Mausoleum at Halicarnassus: narration"	0:42
14.	"The Mausoleum at Halicarnassus"	11:12
Total length:		57:03

== Personnel ==
- Rick Wakeman - Keyboards
- Garfield Morgan - Narration
- Stuart Sawney - Percussion Programming, Engineering
