= Phantom Power (Rick Wakeman album) =

Soundtrack album by Rick Wakeman
- Released: 11 February 1991
- Genre: Progressive rock
- Length: 51:04
- Label: Ambient/President
- Producer: Rick Wakeman

Rick Wakeman chronology
Night Airs (1990)	Phantom Power (1991)	In the Beginning (1990)

Professional ratings
Review scores
Source	Rating
Allmusic	2/5 stars

Phantom Power is a 1991 album by Rick Wakeman, written as a modern soundtrack for a re-release of the 1925 silent film The Phantom of the Opera. The album was re-released in 2010 by 101 Distribution as Rick Wakeman: Phantom of the Opera.

== Track listing ==
1. "The Visit"
2. "Heaven"
3. "The Rat"
4. "The Stiff"
5. "Evil Love"
6. "The Voice of Love"
7. "Heat of the Moment"
8. "Fear of Love"
9. "The Love Trilogy"
10. "The Hangman"
11. "The Sand Dance"
12. "You Can't Buy My Love"
13. "Phantom Power"
14. "Rock Pursuit"

== Personnel ==
- Rick Wakeman - keyboards
- Ashley Holt - vocals
- Chrissie Hammond - vocals
- D'zal Martin - guitar
- Ramon Remedios - tenor vocals
- Tony Fernandez - drums, percussion
