= Classic Tracks (Rick Wakeman album) =

Studio album by Rick Wakeman
- Released: January 1994
- Recorded: Banjour Studio, Isle of Man, Full Sail Platinum Post, Orlando, FL; Studio 4, Philadelphia, PA
- Genre: Progressive rock
- Length: 47.57
- Label: Zazoo Records
- Producer: Michael Franklin

Classic Tracks is a progressive rock album of re-makes of classic Rick Wakeman songs. It features Wakeman and four American musicians.

Despite the good reviews by fans, Wakeman claims this album was finished and released without his authorization. He also claims that he was threatened with violence if he interfered with the release and was told he wouldn't receive any compensation for it.

"I despise this album in every respect. The master tapes of the back tracks were taken to America and appalling vocals put on them without my approval. The final result was also then sold without my approval and without my receiving a penny. The master tapes were never even returned to me. The album is a disgrace."

— Rick Wakeman, RWCC

In this album, lyrics were added to the 1975 instrumental song "Merlin the Magician" from The Myths and Legends of King Arthur and the Knights of the Round Table. Despite Rick's feelings about this album, this new version of "Merlin the Magician" was later played on tour and one of those performances can be seen on the "Live in Buenos Aires" DVD.

Although Journey to the Centre of the Earth was a song from 1974, this was the first time it was recorded in the studio. This version however is very different from the original. It is a more up-to-date, heavier version and it has no narration. The number of instruments was also very small compared to the original version.

== Track listing ==
| No. | Title | Length |
|---|---|---|
| 1. | "Journey To The Center Of The Earth" | 31:56 |
| 2. | "Catherine Howard" | 9:14 |
| 3. | "Merlin The Magician" | 6:45 |

== Personnel ==
- Rick Wakeman - keyboards
- Michael T. Franklin - lead vocals, keyboards
- Jim Gentry - guitars
- Paul Parker - drums, percussion
- Tim Franklin - bass, backing vocals
- Tom Hook, Tess Franklin, The Full Sail Tabernacle Choir - additional vocals

=== Production ===
- Michael Franklin - producer
- Don Oriolo - producer (exec.)
- Stuart Sawney - recording engineer (Banjour Studio)
- Gary Platt - engineer (Full Sail Platinum Post studio)
- Ken Latchney, Nasser Sharif - assistants (Full Sail Platinum Post studio)
- O. B. O'Brian, Phil Nicolo - engineers (Studio 4)
- Jiff Hinger, Dirk Grobelny - assistants (Studio 4)
- Jay Goodman - main tech
- Tibor Kovalik - Artwork
