= Fairfield Experiment =

Experiment in industrial relations

The Fairfield experiment was an experiment in industrial relations carried out at the Fairfield Shipbuilding and Engineering Company, Glasgow, during the 1960s. The experiment was initiated by Sir Iain Maxwell Stewart, industrialist, chairman of Thermotank Ltd, and signatory to the Marlow Declaration of the early 1960s, and supported by George Brown, the First Secretary in Harold Wilson's cabinet, in 1966. The company was facing closure, and Brown agreed to provide £1 million (£13,135,456.90 in 2021 terms) to enable the Trade Unions, the management, and the shareholders to try out new ways of industrial management.

== The Bowler and the Bunnet ==
The Bowler and the Bunnet was a film directed by Sean Connery and written by Cliff Hanley about the Fairfield Experiment.
