= Sean Connery filmography =

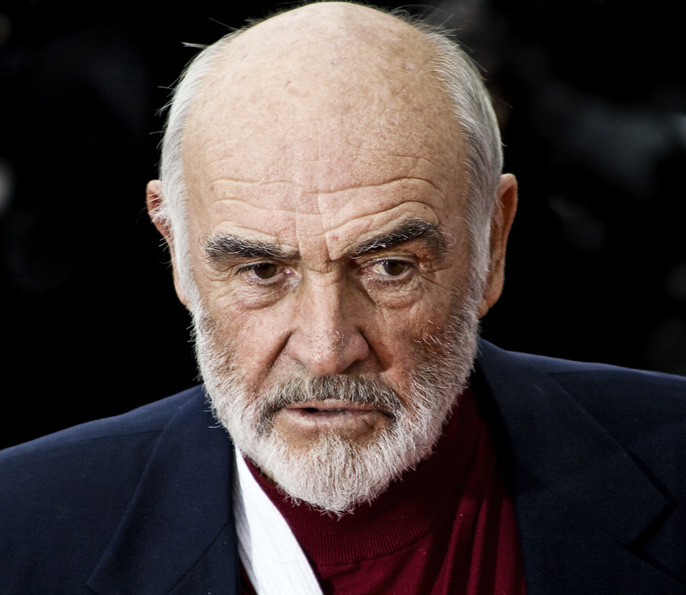
Connery in 2008

Sir Sean Connery (1930–2020) was a Scottish film actor and producer. He was the first actor to play the fictional secret agent James Bond in a theatrical film, starring in six EON Bond films between 1962 and 1971, and again in another non-EON Bond film in 1983. He was also known for his roles as the Arab Chieftain Raisuli in The Wind and the Lion (1975); Jimmy Malone in The Untouchables (1987), for which he won the Academy Award for Best Supporting Actor; Mark Rutland in Marnie (1964); Juan Sánchez Villa-Lobos Ramírez in Highlander (1986); Henry Jones Sr. in Indiana Jones and the Last Crusade (1989); Captain Marko Aleksandrovich Ramius in The Hunt for Red October (1990); John Patrick Mason in The Rock (1996); and Allan Quatermain in The League of Extraordinary Gentlemen (2003). Along with his Academy Award, he won two BAFTA Awards, three Golden Globes, and a Henrietta Award.

== Film ==
Year	Title	Role	Notes	Ref.
1954	Lilacs in the Spring	Extra	Uncredited	
1957	No Road Back	"Spike"		
1957	Hell Drivers	Johnny Kates		
1957	Action of the Tiger	Mike		
1957	Time Lock	Welder #2		
1958	Another Time, Another Place	Mark Trevor		
1958	A Night to Remember	Deckhand	Uncredited Extra	
1959	Darby O'Gill and the Little People	Michael McBride		
1959	Tarzan's Greatest Adventure	O'Bannion		
1961	The Frightened City	Paddy Damion		
1961	On the Fiddle	Pedlar Pascoe		
1962	The Longest Day	Private Flanagan		
1962	Dr. No	James Bond		
1963	From Russia with Love	James Bond		
1964	Woman of Straw	Anthony "Tony" Richmond		
1964	Marnie	Mark Rutland		
1964	Goldfinger	James Bond		
1965	The Hill	Joe Roberts		
1965	Thunderball	James Bond		
1966	Un monde nouveau	Himself	Cameo	
1966	A Fine Madness	Samson Shillitoe		
1967	You Only Live Twice	James Bond		
1967	The Bowler and the Bunnet	Himself	Documentary; also director	
1968	Shalako	Shalako		
1969	The Red Tent	Dr. Roald Amundsen		
1970	The Molly Maguires	Jack Kehoe		
1971	The Anderson Tapes	Duke Anderson		
1971	Diamonds Are Forever	James Bond		
1972	España campo de golf	Himself	Short film	
1972	The Offence	Johnson		
1974	Zardoz	Zed		
1974	Murder on the Orient Express	Colonel Arbuthnot		
1974	Ransom	Tahlvik	Aka The Terrorists	
1975	The Dream Factory	Himself	Documentary	
1975	The Wind and the Lion	Mulai Ahmed er Raisuni		
1975	The Man Who Would Be King	Daniel Dravot		
1976	Robin and Marian	Robin Hood		
1976	The Next Man	Khalil Abdul-Muhsen		
1977	A Bridge Too Far	Major General Roy Urquhart		
1978	The First Great Train Robbery	Edward Pierce / John Simms		
1979	Meteor	Dr. Paul Bradley		
1979	Cuba	Major Robert Dapes		
1981	Outland	Marshal William T. O'Niel		
1981	Time Bandits	King Agamemnon / Fireman		
1982	G'olé!	Narrator	Documentary	
1982	Five Days One Summer	Douglas Meredith		
1982	Wrong Is Right	Patrick Hale		
1983	Sean Connery's Edinburgh	Himself	Short documentary	
1983	Never Say Never Again	James Bond	Final film as James Bond	
1984	Sword of the Valiant	The Green Knight		
1986	Highlander	Juan Sánchez Villa-Lobos Ramírez		
1986	The Name of the Rose	William of Baskerville		
1987	The Untouchables	Officer Jimmy Malone	Academy Award for Best Supporting Actor	
1988	The Presidio	Lieutenant Colonel Alan Caldwell		
1988	Memories of Me	Himself	Uncredited cameo	
1989	Indiana Jones and the Last Crusade	Henry Jones Sr.		
1989	Family Business	Jessie McMullen		
1990	The Hunt for Red October	Captain Marko Ramius		
1990	The Russia House	Barley		
1991	Highlander II: The Quickening	Juan Sánchez Villa-Lobos Ramírez		
1991	Robin Hood: Prince of Thieves	King Richard the Lionheart	Uncredited cameo	
1992	Medicine Man	Dr. Robert Campbell		
1993	Rising Sun	John Connor	Also executive producer	
1994	A Good Man in Africa	Dr. Alex Murray		
1995	Just Cause	Paul Armstrong	Also executive producer	
1995	First Knight	King Arthur		
1996	Dragonheart	Draco	Voice role	
1996	The Rock	John Patrick Mason	Also executive producer	
1998	The Avengers	Sir August de Wynter		
1998	Playing by Heart	Paul		
1999	Entrapment	Robert "Mac" MacDougal	Also producer	
2000	Finding Forrester	William Forrester	Also producer	
2003	The League of Extraordinary Gentlemen	Allan Quatermain	Also executive producer	
2012	Sir Billi	Sir Billi	Voice role; also executive producer	
2012	Ever to Excel	Narrator	Documentary	

== Television ==
Year	Title	Role	Notes	Ref.
1956	Dixon of Dock Green	Joe Brasted	Episode: "Ladies of the Manor"	
1956	The Condemned	Performer	Television film	
1956	Sailor of Fortune	Achmed	Episode: "The Crescent and the Star"	
1957	The Jack Benny Program	Hotel Porter	Episode: "Jack and Mary in Rome"	
1957	BBC Sunday Night Theatre	Harlan "Mountain" McClintok	Episode: "Blood Money"	
1957	ITV Television Playhouse	Mat Burke	Episode: "Anna Christie"	
1958	Women in Love	Johnnie	Television film	
1958	Armchair Theatre	Performer	Episode: "The Boy with Meat Axe"	
1959	The Magical World of Disney	Michael MacBride	Episode: "I Captured the King of the Leprechauns"	
1959–1960	ITV Play of the Week	Various roles	4 episodes	
1960	BBC Sunday Night Theatre	Julien	Episode: "Colombe"	
1960	An Age of Kings	Harry Percy / Hotspur	5 episodes	
1960	Without the Grail	Innes Corrie	Television film	
1961	Adventure Story	Alexander the Great	Television film	
1961	Anna Karenina	Count Alexis Vronsky	Television film	
1961	Macbeth	Macbeth	Television film	
1969	Male of the Species	MacNeil	Television film	
1969	ITV Sunday Night Theatre	MacNeil	Television film	
2003	Freedom: A History of US	John Muir	Episode: "Yearning to Breathe Free"	
2007	Modern Greeks: C.P. Cavafy	Narrator	Documentary television film	

== Theatre ==
Year	Title	Role	Venue	Ref.
1952–1953	South Pacific	Male Chorus	Bristol Hippodrome	
1955	A Witch in Time	Robert Callender	Q Theatre	
1959	The Sea Shell	Stephen Mitchell	King's Theatre, Theatre Royal and other locations.	
1960	Anna Christie	Matt Burke	Oxford Playhouse	
1962	Judith		Her Majesty's Theatre	
1966–1967	Volpone	Presented by	Oxford Playhouse and Garrick Theatre, London	
1969–1970	I've Seen You Cut Lemons	Director	Fortune Theatre, London, New Theatre and other locations	
1996–2003	Art	Producer	Wyndham's Theatre, London, Whitehall Theatre and Royale Theatre, Broadway	

== Music videos ==
Year	Title	Artist
2008	"Drink Some More"	The Real McKenzies

== Video games ==
Year	Title	Voice role	Notes	Ref.
2005	James Bond 007: From Russia with Love	James Bond	Likeness, voice role	
