= Iain Maxwell Stewart =

Scottish industrialist (1916–1985)

Sir Iain Maxwell Stewart LLD (Strathclyde), BSc, MINA, MINE, MIMEch.E
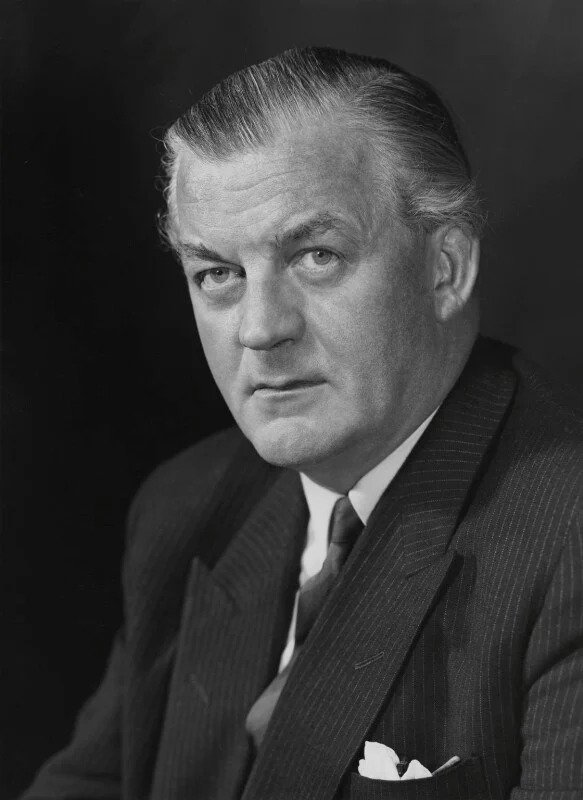
- Sir Iain M Stewart in 1968.
- Born: 1916
- Died: 17 December 1985 (aged 68–69); East Grinstead, England
- Education: Lorreto School, Edinburgh
- Occupation: Scottish Industrialist
- Parent(s): William Maxwell Stewart, Jessie Brown

Sir Iain Maxwell Stewart (1916–1985) LLD (Strathclyde), BSc, MINA, MINE, MIMEch.E was a Scottish industrialist with a strong interest in modernising industrial relations.

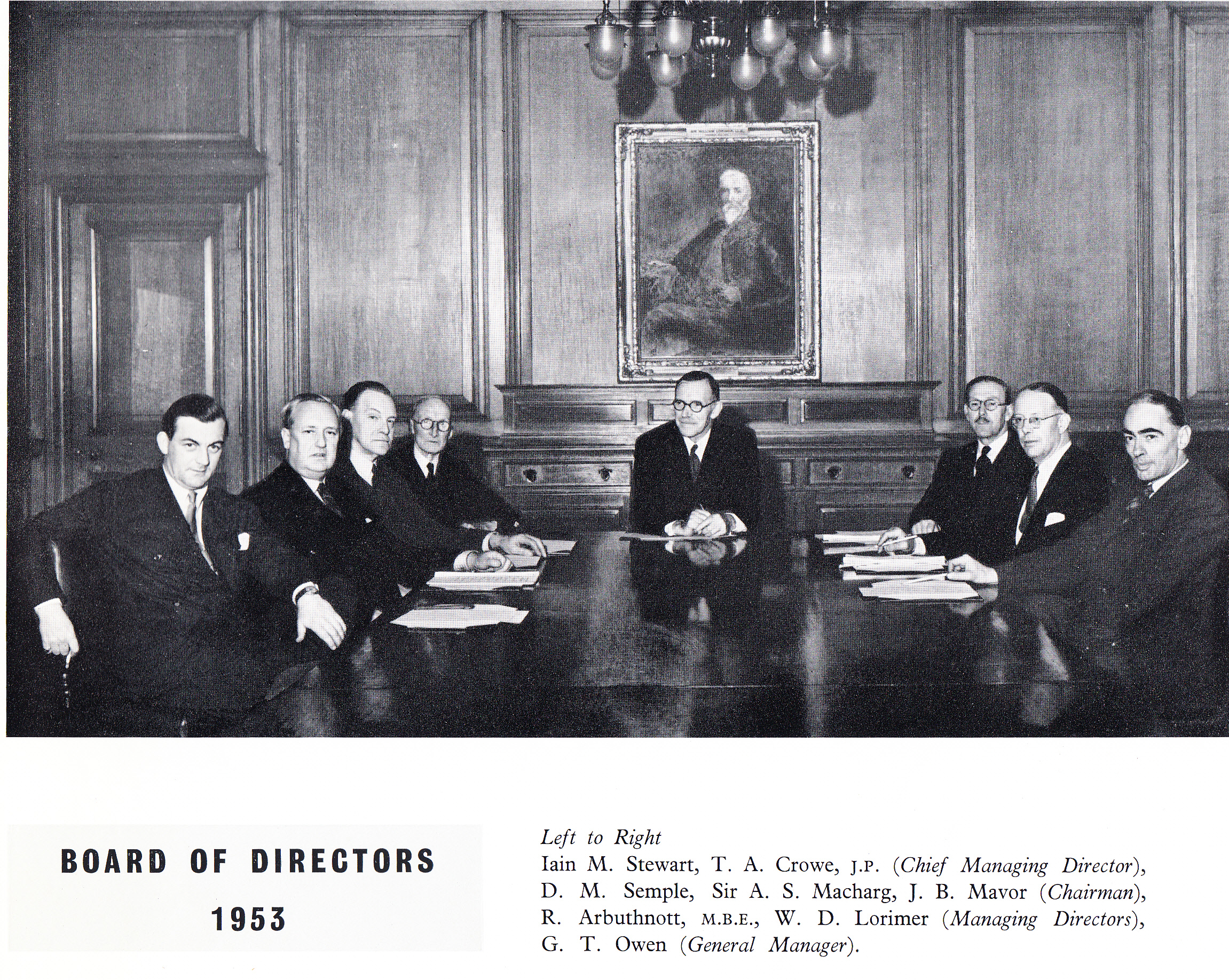
Iain M Stewart, (on left) director, at North British Locomotive company board meeting Glasgow 1953.

== Background ==
Stewart was a son of William Maxwell Stewart (1874–1926) who was one of three brothers with Alexander William Stewart (1865–1933) and Frederick Charles Stewart (1879–1950). William and Alexander worked in the Clydebank shipyard of J&G Thomson & Co Ltd, later John Brown & Company, while Frederick became an electrical engineer. In 1901 the three brothers formed their own Glasgow-based company, Thermotank, which successfully pioneered heating, cooling and ventilation systems, including the 'Punkah Louvre' and 'Thermo-Reg Louvre', fitted in ships, aircraft, trains and buildings.

Fully qualified as a ventilating engineer, Iain M Stewart – now a Lieutenant in the Fife & Forfar Yeomanry – married in November 1941, at Troon, Margaret Jean Walker, only daughter of chemical manufacturer Brigadier-General James Workman Walker and of Jane Stevenson, Redburn House, Irvine. They set up home in Lochbrae House, Bearsden and had four children.

== Career ==
=== Thermotank ===
When Frederick died a bachelor in 1950, the Thermotank business interests passed to his then 34-year old nephew, Iain, the surviving son of William. In 1959, Iain Stewart also became chairman of a holding company, Hall-Thermotank Ltd, formed after a merger with Dartford-based J & E Hall.

With its headquarters in Helen Street, Govan, the pioneering heating, cooling and ventilating Thermotank Ltd group of companies in Glasgow soon had branches and agencies world-wide. Clients included shipping lines, navies, railway companies, airlines, major offices, hotels and commercial firms, including the processing and transporting of liquids and high volume goods. He promoted the integration and joint working of employees and management.

=== Industrial relations ===
Stewart was president of the Institution of Engineers and Shipbuilders in Scotland during which period he founded the biennial Marlow lectures, which commenced in 1964. The name of the lectures derived from the Marlow Declaration of 1963. Stewart was the seventh of 26 signatories ("from the churches, the boardrooms, the trade unions and the teaching profession") of those who met in Marlow over 15 months between November 1961 and February 1963 to discuss social and industrial relations. The Declaration was considered a clear statement of the problems then facing industry. It talked about an ethical approach to business and social issues, stating that industry had five responsibilities, to employees, to shareholders, to consumers, to local community and to the nation. It held that "the most valuable asset of any organization is best measured by the skill, knowledge, loyalty, enthusiasm and goodwill of those whom it employs, and those with whom it does business."

Sir Iain M Stewart gave the Institution of Engineers and Shipbuilders the substantial sum of £10,000 to underwrite the aptly-named Marlow Lectures, an important event in Scotland's calendar. Stewart gave the Fifth Marlow lecture in 1972, titled "Redundancy – the Scrap Heap or a New Job Opportunity?", The printed paper published in October 1972 by IESIS, Glasgow, of 156 pages includes the full Marlow Declaration at pages 48 to 54

A keen golfer (later captain of The Royal and Ancient Golf Club of St Andrews, 1972–1973), Stewart was a golfing partner with actor Sean Connery, a connection which led to the latter directing and presenting his own film, The Bowler and the Bunnet in 1967. The film described the Fairfield Experiment, a new approach to industrial relations carried out at the Fairfield Shipbuilding and Engineering Company, Glasgow during the 1960s, initiated by Stewart, and supported by George Brown, the First Secretary in Harold Wilson's cabinet, in 1966. The company was facing closure, and Brown agreed to provide £1 million to enable trade unions, the management and the shareholders to try out new ways of industrial management. As Fairfield (Glasgow) Ltd, the first ship delivered was a bulk carrier named Atlantic City, in February 1967, when Stewart said the Fairfield experiment was working as a proving ground for industrial relations.

=== Honours ===
Stewart was knighted in the 1968 Birthday Honours. In April 1975, he was awarded an honorary Doctor of Laws degree by the University of Strathclyde.

=== Directorships ===
In addition to the Thermotank companies Stewart was a long serving director and eventual vice-chairman of Scottish Television (STV). Its founder Roy Thomson, 1st Baron Thomson of Fleet became a major investor in Fairfields (Glasgow) Ltd, as did Sir Iain M Stewart. To support the innovations at Fairfields STV's personnel department and some journalists moved their base to Govan from the Theatre Royal HQ of STV in Hope Street, Glasgow.

He also served as a director of many other companies including Babcock & Wilcox, Eagle Star Insurance, British Caledonian Airways of which he became deputy-chairman, retiring in 1984 one year before his death, British Airways, National Commercial Bank of Scotland, Royal Bank of Scotland, Dorchester Hotel owned by the family of Sir Robert McAlpine, Radio Clyde, and Lyle Shipping Co Ltd of which he became chairman.

Sean Connery, Sir Iain M Stewart and F1 world racing champion Sir Jackie Stewart formed the Scottish International Educational Trust in 1970, which continues today. Stewart bequeathed funds for the Sir Iain Stewart Foundation, which also continues today.

== Death ==
Sir Iain Maxwell Stewart died at his home in December 1985.
