= Volution Group =

UK company

Volution Group plc
- Type: Public limited company
- Traded as: LSE: FAN; FTSE 250 component
- Industry: Ventilation equipment
- Founded: 2002
- Headquarters: Crawley, West Sussex, United Kingdom
- Key people: Nigel Lingwood (chairman); Ronnie George (CEO)
- Revenue: ▲£484.8 million (2026)
- Operating income: ▲£95.9 million (2026)
- Net income: ▲£62.5 million (2026)
- Website: www.volutiongroupplc.com

Volution Group plc is a manufacturer of ventilation equipment for commercial and residential customers. Based in Crawley, West Sussex, the company is listed on the London Stock Exchange and is a constituent of the FTSE 250 Index.

== History ==
The company was established as a separate entity when HSBC Private Equity acquired the Air Movement and Cable Management businesses of Smiths Group for £125 million in December 2002. It was acquired by ABN AMRO in July 2006 and by TowerBrook Capital Partners in February 2012. It was then the subject of an initial public offering on the London Stock Exchange in June 2014.

Since its IPO, Volution has acquired 25 businesses in the UK, Continental Europe, Australia and New Zealand.

== Operations ==
The company's brands include UK-based Vent-Axia.
