= William Maxwell Stewart =

Scottish industrialist (1874-1926)

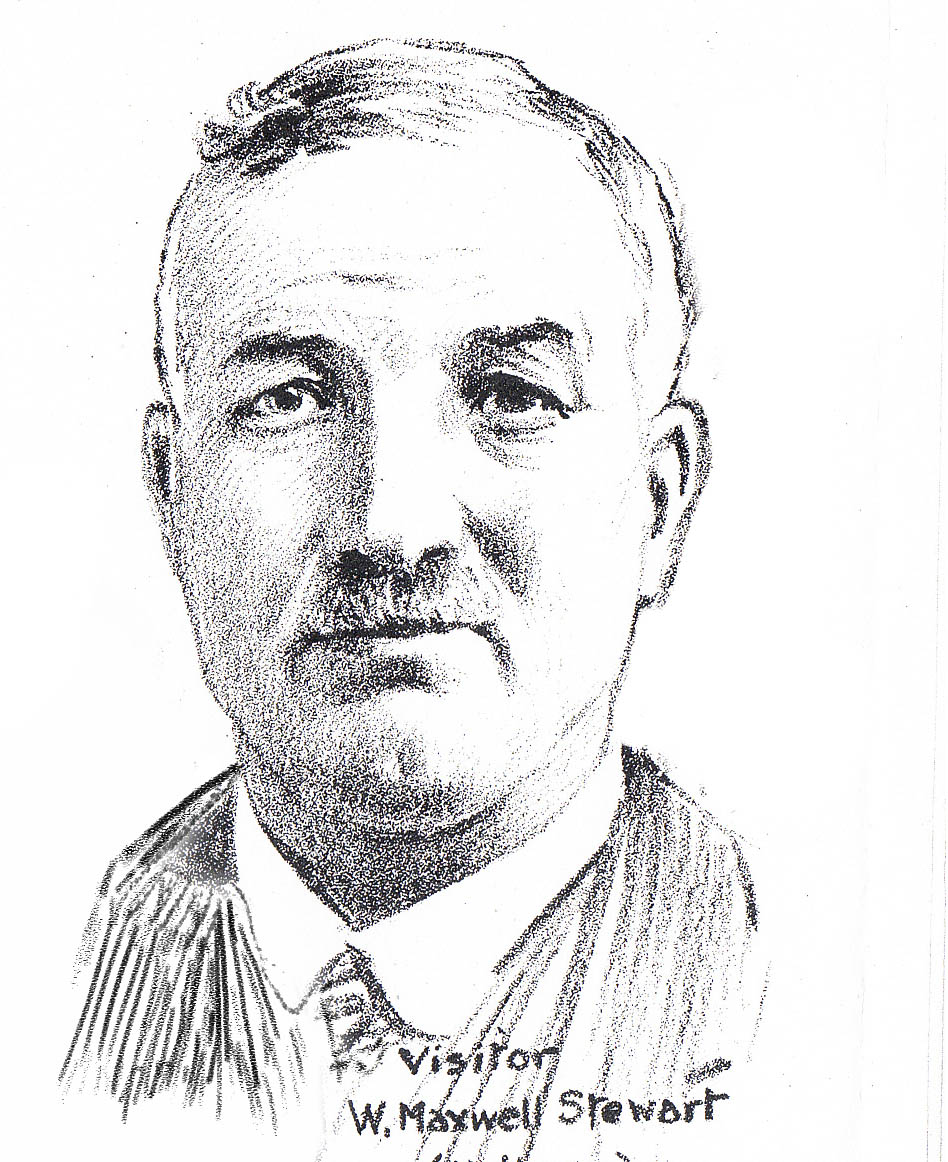
- William Maxwell Stewart in 1922 as Deacon-Visitor of the Incorporation of Maltmen, based in the Trades House of Glasgow.
- Born: 30 January 1874; Old Kilpatrick, Scotland
- Died: 1926 (aged 51); Bearsden, Scotland
- Education: Allan Glen's School
- Occupation: Electrical Engineer
- Parent(s): William Stewart, Isabella Sinclair

William Maxwell Stewart (1874-1926) was a Scottish ventilation engineer of distinction.

He was the middle of three shipbuilding and engineering brothers in Glasgow who revolutionised heating, cooling and ventilation in shipping accommodation, railways, aircraft and public buildings around the world .

He and his brothers Alexander William Stewart (1865-1933) and (Sir) Frederick Charles Stewart (1879-1950) were born to Dalmuir-based railway station agent turned coal merchant William Stewart and his wife Isabella née Sinclair. His parents had married in Grangemouth in 1862; William (senior) then being a groom and son of a William Stewart, a mason in Bathgate, and Isabella Sinclair Stewart who was a daughter of sea captain David Sinclair and his wife Isabella Maxwell.

In 1901 the three brothers set up their own firm, Thermotank, based in Glasgow with works coming next to the Clyde at Govan in 1908, and later with branches and agencies overseas.

In 1913 William M Stewart married Jessie Brown of Newlands, Glasgow and settled in Lochbrae House, overlooking St Germain's Loch, Bearsden.

Beyond work he was appointed in 1922 as the Deacon (also known as Visitor) of the long-established Incorporation of Maltmen in the Trades House Glasgow. An appreciation of him in the Glasgow Bailie magazine of 23 September 1922 describes his career to date:-

"Educated at Allan Glen's and at the University where he studied engineering. he served his apprenticeship with the Clydebank Shipbuilding and Engineering Company (now John Brown & Co) and turning specially to electrical engineering he was afterwards engaged with Clarke, Chapman & Co, Newcastle. Mr Maxwell Stewart was joint founder of the Thermotank Company and the Thermotank Engineering Company. During the war [WWI] the company made notable work in the making of high explosive shells. The Deacon [also known as Visitor] of the Incorporation of Maltmen is a member of the Electrical Engineers Institute and the Institute of Engineers and Shipbuilders, and of the Scottish Automobile Club in Blythswood Square."

Stewart died in 1926 at home in Lochbrae House, Bearsden; with the younger of his two bachelor brothers continuing to lead the Thermotank businesses. After his elder son, William Alexander Frederick Stewart, died in 1940 age 26 it was his younger son (Sir) Iain Maxwell Stewart who would join Thermotank as a director, becoming its chairman on the death of his uncle (Sir) Frederick Charles Stewart in 1950.
