= Sean Connery =

Scottish actor and producer (1930–2020)

Sir Sean Connery
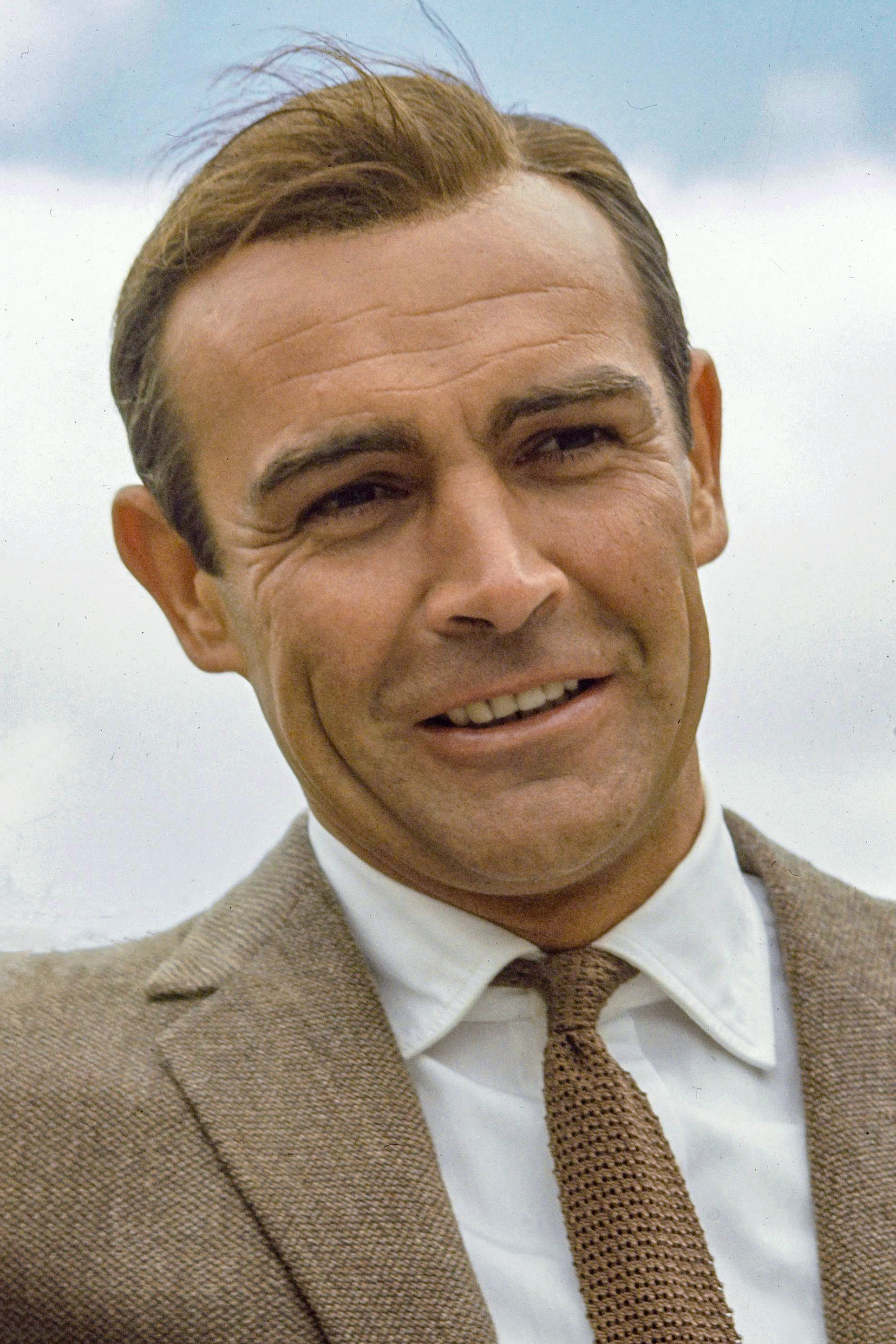
- Connery in 1964
- Born: Thomas Sean Connery; 25 August 1930; Edinburgh, Scotland
- Died: 31 October 2020 (aged 90); Lyford Cay, Bahamas
- Occupations: Actor; film producer
- Years active: 1954–2006; 2012
- Works: Full list
- Spouses: Diane Cilento (m. 1962; div. 1973) Micheline Roquebrune (m. 1975)
- Children: Jason Connery
- Relatives: Neil Connery (brother)
- Awards: Knight Bachelor (2000)
- Website: seanconnery.com

Sir Thomas Sean Connery (25 August 1930 – 31 October 2020) was a Scottish actor and film producer. Connery was the first actor to portray the fictional British secret agent James Bond in motion pictures, starring in seven Bond films between 1962 and 1983. He originated the role in Dr. No (1962) and continued starring as Bond in the Eon Productions films From Russia with Love (1963), Goldfinger (1964), Thunderball (1965), You Only Live Twice (1967) and Diamonds Are Forever (1971). His final appearance in the role was with Never Say Never Again (1983), a non-Eon-produced Bond film.

Connery is also known for his work with directors such as Alfred Hitchcock, Sidney Lumet and John Huston. Their films in which Connery appeared included Marnie (1964), The Hill (1965), The Offence (1973), Murder on the Orient Express (1974) and The Man Who Would Be King (1975). He also acted in Robin and Marian (1976), A Bridge Too Far (1977), Time Bandits (1981), Highlander, The Name of the Rose (both 1986), Indiana Jones and the Last Crusade (1989), The Hunt for Red October (1990), Dragonheart, The Rock (both 1996) and Finding Forrester (2000). His final film roles were The League of Extraordinary Gentlemen (2003) and Sir Billi (2012).

Connery received numerous accolades. For his role in The Untouchables (1987), he received the Academy Award for Best Supporting Actor (making him the first Scottish actor to win a major Oscar) and the Golden Globe Award for Best Supporting Actor – Motion Picture. In the same year, Connery received the BAFTA Award for Best Actor in a Leading Role for his role in The Name of the Rose. As producer of Art, he won the Tony Award for Best Play in 1998. Connery also received honorary awards such as the Cecil B. DeMille Award in 1987, the BAFTA Fellowship in 1998 and the Kennedy Center Honors in 1999. He was made a Commander of the Order of Arts and Letters in France and a knight by Queen Elizabeth II for his services to drama in the 2000 New Year Honours.

== Early life and education ==
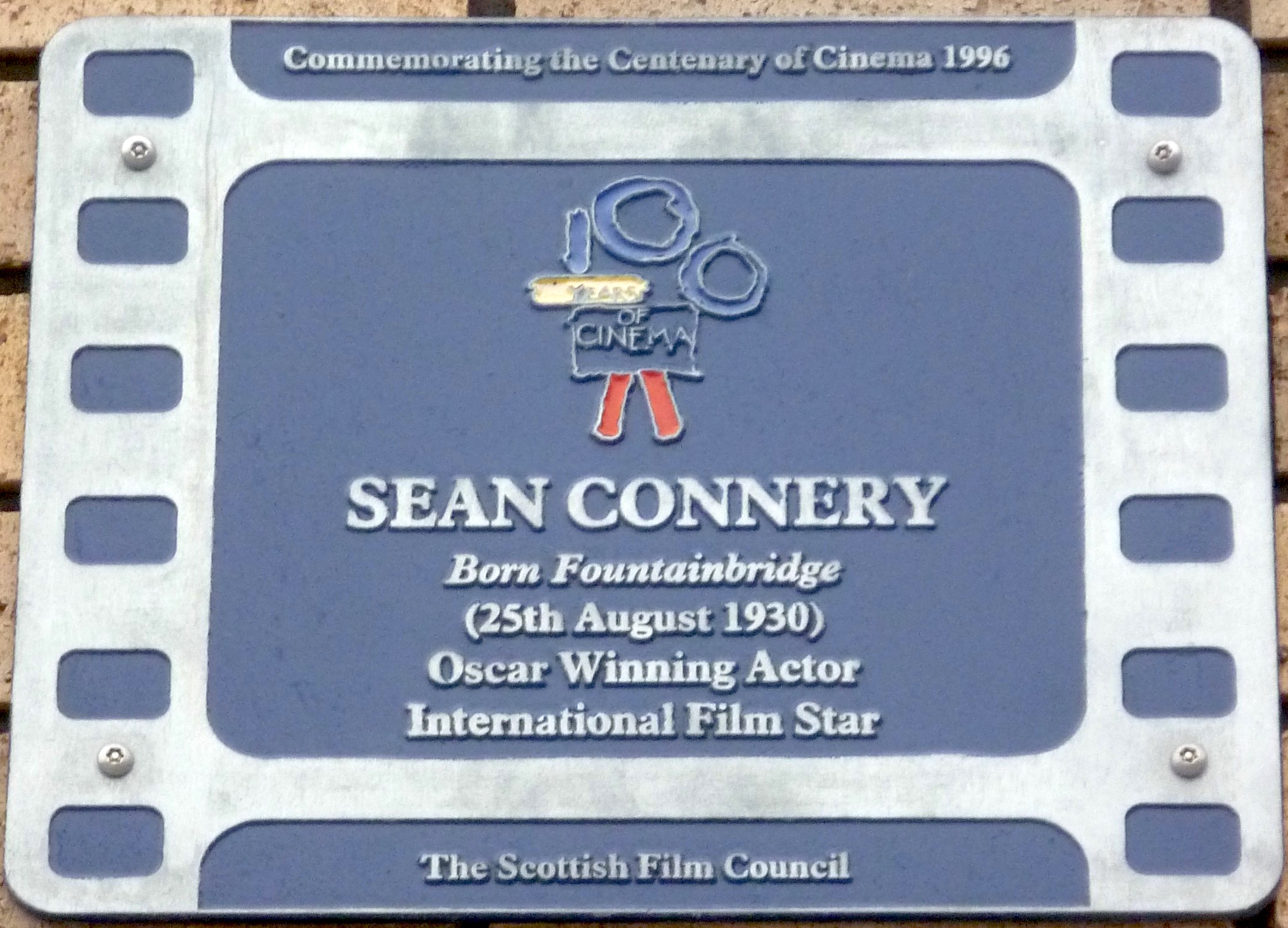
Sean Connery plaque near the site of his birth in Fountainbridge, Edinburgh

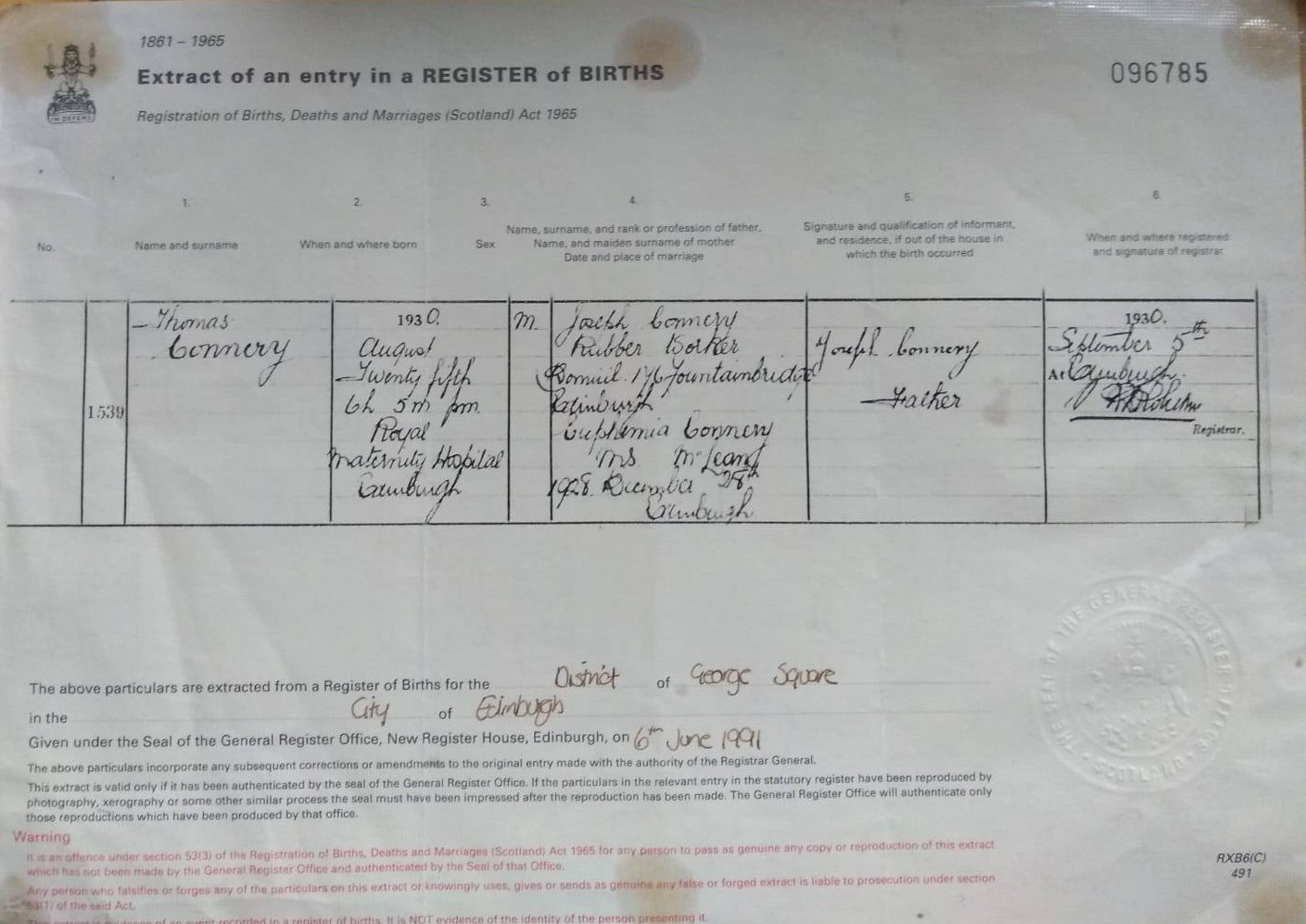
Connery's birth certificate

Thomas Sean Connery was born at the Royal Maternity Hospital in Edinburgh, Scotland, on 25 August 1930; he was named after his paternal grandfather. Connery was of half-Irish and half-Scottish descent. He was brought up at No. 176 Fountainbridge, a block which has since been demolished. His mother, Euphemia McBain "Effie" McLean, was a cleaning woman. The daughter of Neil McLean and Helen Forbes Ross, she was named after her father's mother, Euphemia McBain, wife of John McLean and daughter of William McBain from Ceres in Fife. Connery's father, Joseph Connery, was a factory worker and lorry driver.

Two of his paternal great-grandparents emigrated to Scotland from Wexford, Ireland, in the mid-19th century, with his great-grandfather James Connery being an Irish Traveller. The remainder of his family was of Scottish descent, and his maternal great-grandparents were native Scottish Gaelic-speakers from Fife and Uig on Skye. His father was a Roman Catholic, and his mother was a Protestant. Connery had a younger brother Neil and was generally referred to in his youth as "Tommy". Although he was small in primary school, he grew rapidly around the age of 12, reaching his full adult height of 6 ft 2 in (188 cm) at 18. Connery was known during his teen years as "Big Tam", and he said that he lost his virginity to an adult woman in an ATS uniform at the age of 14. He had an Irish childhood friend named Séamus; when the two were together, those who knew them both called Connery by his middle name Sean, emphasising the assonance of the two names. Since then Connery preferred to use his middle name.

Connery's first job was as a milkman in Edinburgh with St. Cuthbert's Co-operative Society. In 2009, Connery recalled a conversation in a taxi:

When I took a taxi during a recent Edinburgh Film Festival, the driver was amazed that I could put a name to every street we passed. "How come?" he asked. "As a boy I used to deliver milk round here", I said. "So what do you do now?" That was rather harder to answer.

In 1946, at the age of 16, Connery joined the Royal Navy, during which time he acquired two tattoos. Connery's official website says "unlike many tattoos, his were not frivolous – his tattoos reflect two of his lifelong commitments: his family and Scotland. ... One tattoo is a tribute to his parents and reads 'Mum and Dad', and the other is self-explanatory, 'Scotland Forever'". He trained in Portsmouth at the naval gunnery school and in an anti-aircraft crew. He was later assigned as an Able Seaman on HMS Formidable. Connery was discharged from the navy at the age of 19 on medical grounds because of a duodenal ulcer, a condition that affected most of the males in previous generations of his family.

Afterwards, he returned to the co-op and worked as a lorry driver, a lifeguard at Portobello swimming baths, a labourer, an artist's model for the Edinburgh College of Art, and after a suggestion by the former Mr. Scotland Archie Brennan, as a coffin polisher, amongst other jobs. The modelling earned him 15 shillings an hour. Artist Richard Demarco, at the time a student who painted several early pictures of Connery, described him as "very straight, slightly shy, too, too beautiful for words, a virtual Adonis".

Connery began bodybuilding at the age of 18, and from 1951 trained heavily with Ellington, a former gym instructor in the British Army. While his official website states he was third in the 1950 Mr. Universe contest, most sources place him in the 1953 competition, either third in the Junior class or failing to place in the Tall Man classification. Connery said he was soon deterred from bodybuilding when he found that Americans frequently beat him in competitions because of sheer muscle size and they, unlike Connery, refused to participate in athletic activity which could make them lose muscle mass.

Connery was a keen footballer, having played for Bonnyrigg Rose in his younger days. He was offered a trial with East Fife. While on tour with South Pacific, Connery played in a football match against a local team that Matt Busby, manager of Manchester United, happened to be scouting. According to reports, Busby was impressed with his physical prowess and offered Connery a contract worth £25 a week (equivalent to £606 in 2025) immediately after the game. Connery said he was tempted to accept, but he recalls, "I realised that a top-class footballer could be over the hill by the age of 30, and I was already 23. I decided to become an actor and it turned out to be one of my more intelligent moves".

== Career ==
=== 1951–1959: Career beginnings ===
Seeking to supplement his income, Connery helped out backstage at the King's Theatre in late 1951. During a bodybuilding competition held in London in 1953, one of the competitors mentioned that auditions were being held for a production of South Pacific, and Connery landed a small part as one of the Seabees chorus boys. By the time the production reached Edinburgh, he had been given the part of Marine Cpl. Hamilton Steeves and was understudying two of the juvenile leads, and his salary was raised from £12 to £14–10s a week. The production returned the following year, out of popular demand, and Connery was promoted to the featured role of Lieutenant Buzz Adams, which Larry Hagman had portrayed in the West End.

While in Edinburgh, Connery was targeted by the Valdor gang, one of the most violent in the city. He was first approached by them in a billiard hall where he prevented them from stealing his jacket and was later followed by six gang members to a 15-foot-high (4.6 m) balcony at the Palais de Danse. There, Connery grabbed one by the throat and another by the biceps, cracking their heads together. From then on, the gang treated him with respect and he had a "hard man" reputation.

Connery met Michael Caine at a party during a production of South Pacific in 1954, and the two later became close friends. During this production at the Manchester Opera House, Connery developed a serious interest in the theatre through the American actor Robert Henderson, who lent him copies of the Henrik Ibsen works Hedda Gabler, The Wild Duck, and When We Dead Awaken and later listed works by the likes of Proust, Tolstoy, Turgenev, Bernard Shaw, Joyce, and Shakespeare. Henderson urged Connery to take elocution lessons and got him parts at the Maida Vale Theatre in London. He had already begun a film career, having been an extra in Herbert Wilcox's 1954 musical Lilacs in the Spring with Errol Flynn and Anna Neagle.

Although Connery had secured several roles as an extra, he was struggling to make ends meet and was forced to accept a part-time job as a babysitter for the journalist Peter Noble and his actress wife Marianne, which earned him 10 shillings a night. He met the Hollywood actress Shelley Winters one night at Noble's house; she described Connery as "one of the tallest and most charming and masculine Scotsmen" she had ever seen and later spent many evenings with the Connery brothers drinking beer. Around this time, Connery was residing at TV presenter Llew Gardner's house. Henderson landed Connery a role in a £6-a-week Q Theatre production of Agatha Christie's Witness for the Prosecution, during which he met and befriended Ian Bannen. This role was followed by Point of Departure and A Witch in Time at Kew, a role as Pentheus opposite Yvonne Mitchell in The Bacchae at the Oxford Playhouse, and a role opposite Jill Bennett in Eugene O'Neill's play Anna Christie.

During his time at the Oxford theatre, Connery won a brief part as a boxer in the TV series The Square Ring before being spotted by the Canadian director Alvin Rakoff, who gave him multiple roles in The Condemned, shot on location in Dover in Kent. In 1956, Connery appeared in the theatrical production of Epitaph and played a minor role as a hoodlum in the "Ladies of the Manor" episode of the BBC Television police series Dixon of Dock Green. This was followed by small television parts in Sailor of Fortune and The Jack Benny Program (in a special episode filmed in Europe).

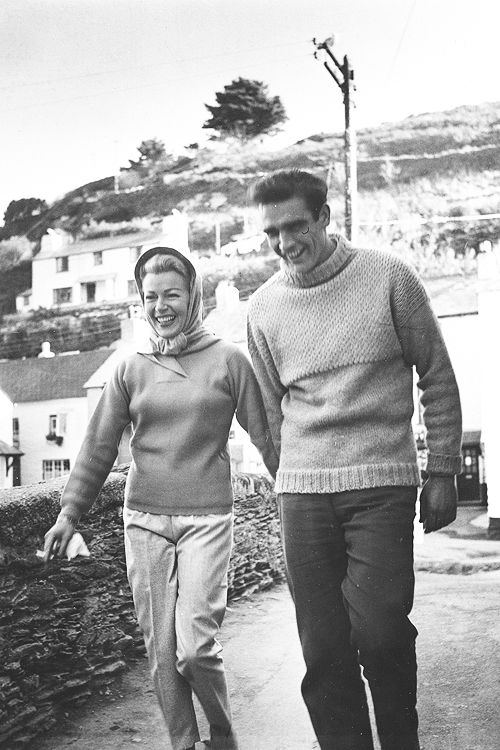
Connery with Lana Turner in 1957 on the set of Another Time, Another Place

In early 1957 Connery hired the agent Richard Hatton, who got him his first film role as Spike, a minor gangster with a speech impediment in Montgomery Tully's No Road Back, alongside Skip Homeier, Paul Carpenter, Patricia Dainton, and Norman Wooland. In April 1957, Rakoff – disappointed by Jack Palance – decided to give the young actor his first chance in a leading role and cast Connery as Mountain McLintock in BBC Television's production of Requiem for a Heavyweight. Connery then played a rogue lorry driver named Johnny Yates in Cy Endfield's Hell Drivers (1957) alongside Stanley Baker, Herbert Lom, Peggy Cummins, and Patrick McGoohan. Later in 1957, Connery appeared in Terence Young's poorly received MGM action picture Action of the Tiger, opposite Van Johnson, Martine Carol, Herbert Lom, and Gustavo Rojo; the film was shot on location in southern Spain. He also had a minor role in Gerald Thomas's thriller Time Lock (1957) as a welder, appearing with Robert Beatty, Lee Patterson, Betty McDowall, and Vincent Winter; this commenced filming on 1 December 1956 at Beaconsfield Studios.

Connery had a major role in the melodrama Another Time, Another Place (1958) as a British reporter named Mark Trevor, caught in a love affair opposite Lana Turner and Barry Sullivan. During filming, Turner's possessive gangster boyfriend, Johnny Stompanato, who was visiting from Los Angeles, believed she was having an affair with Connery. Connery and Turner had attended West End shows and London restaurants together. Stompanato stormed onto the film set and pointed a gun at Connery, only to have Connery disarm him and knock him flat on his back. Stompanato was banned from the set. Two Scotland Yard detectives advised Stompanato to leave and escorted him to the airport, where he boarded a plane back to the United States. Connery later recounted that he had to lie low for a while after receiving threats from men linked to Stompanato's boss, Mickey Cohen.

In 1959, Connery landed a leading role in the director Robert Stevenson's Walt Disney Productions film Darby O'Gill and the Little People (1959), alongside Albert Sharpe, Janet Munro, and Jimmy O'Dea. The film is a tale about a wily Irishman and his battle of wits with leprechauns. Upon the film's release, A. H. Weiler of The New York Times praised the cast (save Connery, whom he described as "merely tall, dark, and handsome") and thought the film an "overpoweringly charming concoction of standard Gaelic tall stories, fantasy and romance". He also had prominent television roles in An Age of Kings, a major BBC Television adaptation of Shakespeare's Henriad (playing Hotspur), as well Rudolph Cartier's 1961 productions of Adventure Story and Anna Karenina for BBC Television, co-starring with Claire Bloom in the latter. Also in 1961 he portrayed Macbeth in a CBC television film adaptation of William Shakespeare's Macbeth, with the Australian actress Zoe Caldwell cast as Lady Macbeth.

=== 1962–1983: James Bond and stardom ===
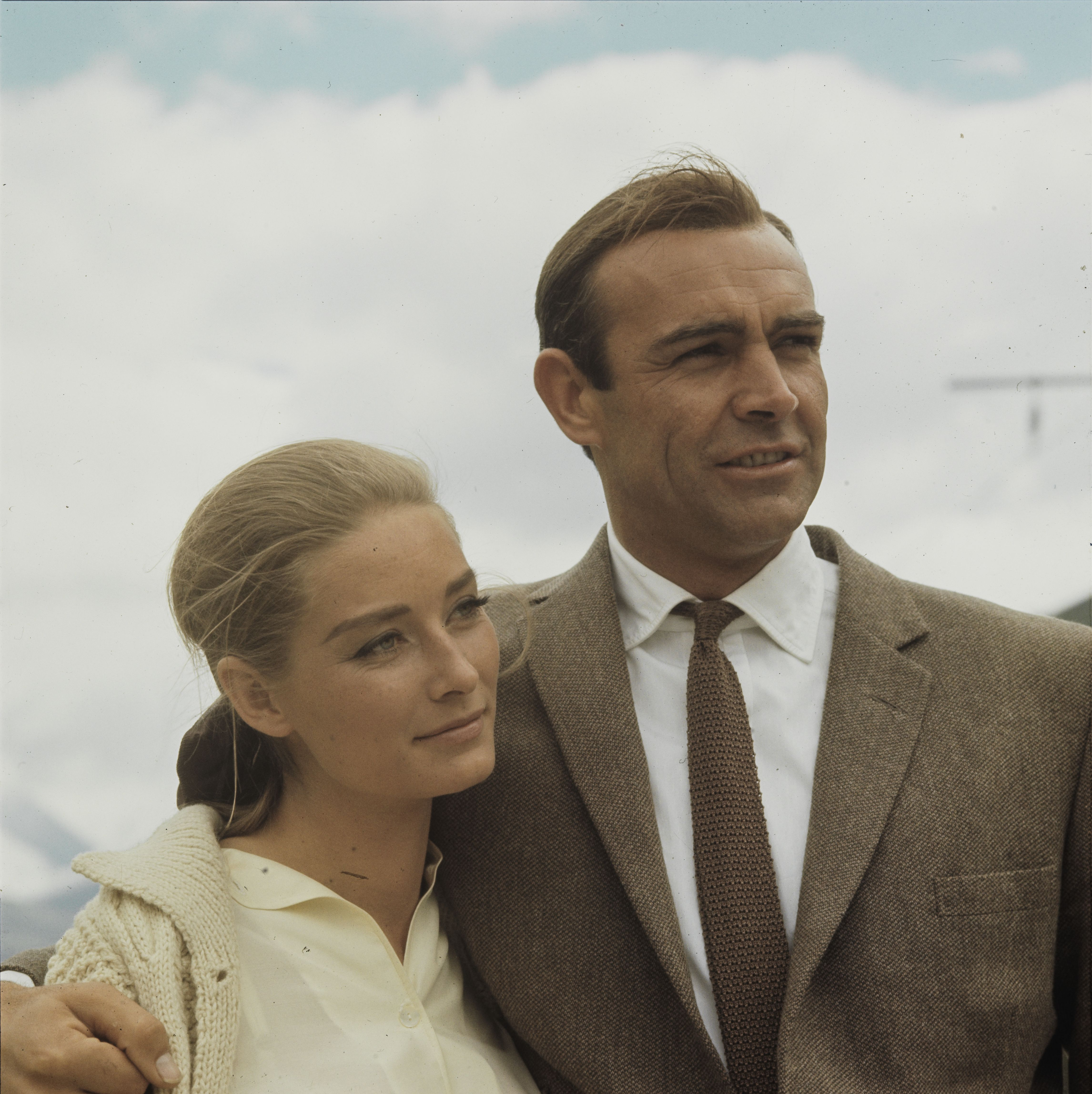
Connery as Bond (with his co-star Tania Mallet) while filming Goldfinger in 1964

Connery's breakthrough came in the role of the fictional British secret agent James Bond in the 1962 film "Dr. No". He was initially reluctant to commit to a film series, but understood that if the franchise succeeded, his film career would greatly benefit. Between 1962 and 1967, Connery played Bond in Dr. No, From Russia with Love, Goldfinger, Thunderball, and You Only Live Twice, the first five Bond films produced by Eon Productions. After departing from the role, Connery returned for the seventh film, Diamonds Are Forever, in 1971. Connery made his final appearance as Bond in Never Say Never Again, a 1983 remake of Thunderball, produced by Jack Schwartzman's Taliafilm. All seven films were commercially successful. James Bond, as portrayed by Connery, was selected as the third-greatest hero in cinema history by the American Film Institute.

The choice of Connery for the role of James Bond owed much to Dana Broccoli, wife of the producer Albert "Cubby" Broccoli, who is reputed to have been instrumental in persuading her husband that Connery was the right man. James Bond's creator, Ian Fleming, originally doubted Connery's casting, saying, "He's not what I envisioned of James Bond looks". Broccoli said "I'm looking for Commander Bond and not an overgrown stunt-man", adding that Connery, being a muscular 6' 2" and a Scot, was unrefined. Fleming's girlfriend Blanche Blackwell told him Connery had the requisite sexual charisma, and Fleming changed his mind after the successful Dr. No premiere; he was so impressed that he subsequently gave the character a Scottish heritage, with his father stated as being from Glencoe in the Scottish Highlands in the 1964 novel You Only Live Twice.

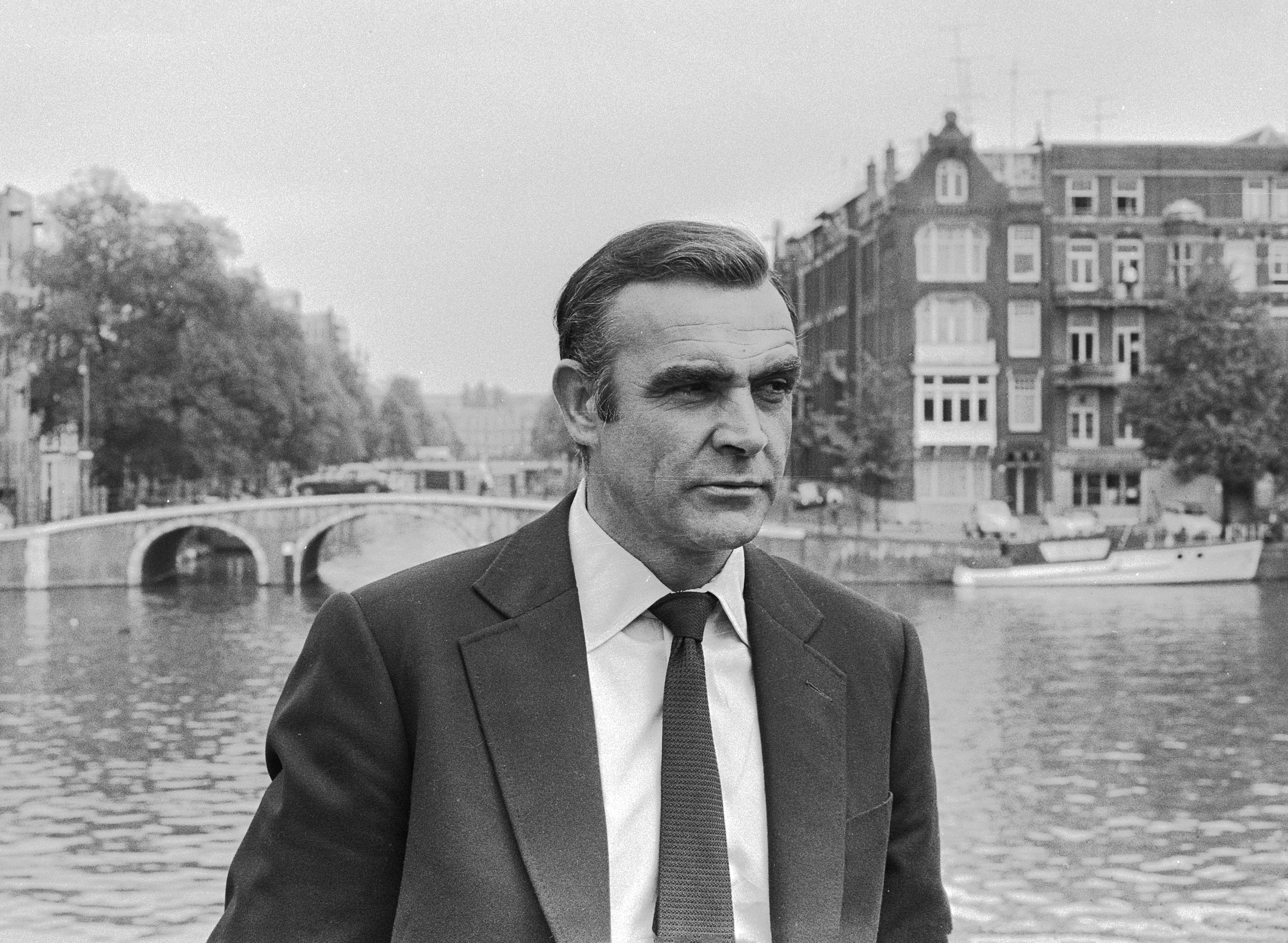
Connery during filming for Diamonds Are Forever in 1971

Connery's portrayal of Bond owes much to stylistic tutelage from the director Terence Young, who helped polish him while using his physical grace and presence for the action. Lois Maxwell, who played Miss Moneypenny, related that "Terence took Sean under his wing. He took him to dinner, showed him how to walk, how to talk, even how to eat". The tutoring was successful; Connery received thousands of fan letters a week after the opening of Dr. No, and he became a major sex symbol in film.

In 1962, following the release of the film Dr. No, the quote, "Bond. James Bond", became a catchphrase in the lexicon of Western popular culture. The film critic Peter Bradshaw writes, "It is the most famous self-introduction from any character in movie history. Three cool monosyllables, surname first, a little curtly, as befits a former naval commander. And then, as if in afterthought, the first name, followed by the surname again. Connery carried it off with icily disdainful style, in full evening dress with a cigarette hanging from his lips. The introduction was a kind of challenge, or seduction, invariably addressed to an enemy. In the early 60s, Connery's James Bond was about as dangerous and sexy as it got on screen".

During the filming of Thunderball in 1965, Connery's life was in danger in the sequence with the sharks in Emilio Largo's pool. He had been concerned about this threat when he read the script. Connery insisted that Ken Adam should build a special Plexiglas partition inside the pool, but this was not a fixed structure, and one of the sharks managed to pass through it. He had to abandon the pool immediately.

=== 1964–1986 ===
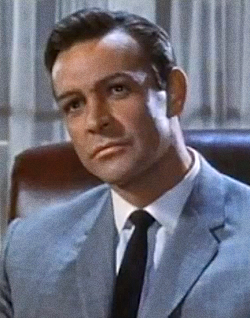
Connery in Alfred Hitchcock's Marnie (1964)

Although Bond had made him a star, Connery grew tired of the role and the pressure the franchise put on him, saying "[I am] fed up to here with the whole Bond bit" and "I have always hated that damned James Bond. I'd like to kill him". Michael Caine said of the situation, "If you were his friend in these early days you didn't raise the subject of Bond. He was, and is, a much better actor than just playing James Bond, but he became synonymous with Bond. He'd be walking down the street and people would say, 'Look, there's James Bond'. That was particularly upsetting to him".

While making the Bond films, Connery also starred in other films such as Alfred Hitchcock's Marnie (1964) and Sidney Lumet's The Hill (1965), which film critic Peter Bradshaw regards as his two great non-Bond pictures from the 1960s. In Marnie, Connery starred opposite Tippi Hedren. Connery had said he wanted to work with Hitchcock, which Eon arranged through their contacts. Connery also shocked many people at the time by asking to see a script, something he did because he was worried about being typecast as a spy and he did not want to do a variation of North by Northwest or Notorious. When told by Hitchcock's agent that Cary Grant had not asked to see even one of Hitchcock's scripts, Connery replied: "I'm not Cary Grant". Hitchcock and Connery got on well during filming, and Connery said he was happy with the film "with certain reservations". In The Hill, Connery wanted to act in something that wasn't Bond related, and he used his leverage as a star to feature in it. While the film wasn't a financial success it was a critical one, debuting at the Cannes Film Festival winning Best Screenplay. The first of five films he made with Lumet, Connery considered him to be one of his favourite directors. The respect was mutual, with Lumet saying of Connery's performance in The Hill, "The thing that was apparent to me – and to most directors – was how much talent and ability it takes to play that kind of character who is based on charm and magnetism. It's the equivalent of high comedy and he did it brilliantly."

In the mid-1960s, Connery played golf with the Scottish industrialist Iain Maxwell Stewart, a connection which led to Connery directing and presenting the documentary film The Bowler and the Bunnet in 1967. The film described the Fairfield Experiment, a new approach to industrial relations carried out at the Fairfield Shipbuilding and Engineering Company, Glasgow, during the 1960s; the experiment was initiated by Stewart and supported by George Brown, the First Secretary in Harold Wilson's cabinet, in 1966. The company was facing closure, and Brown agreed to provide £1 million (£13.135 million; US$15.55 million in 2021) to enable trade unions, the management and the shareholders to try out new ways of industrial management.

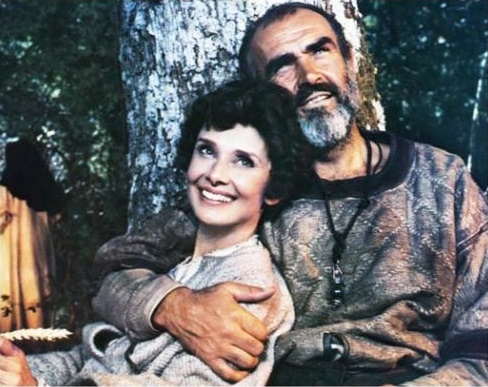
Connery with Audrey Hepburn in Robin and Marian (1976)

Having played Bond six times, Connery's global popularity was such that he shared a Golden Globe Henrietta Award with Charles Bronson for "World Film Favorite – Male" in 1972. He appeared in John Huston's The Man Who Would Be King (1975) opposite Michael Caine. Playing two former British soldiers who set themselves up as kings in Kafiristan, both actors regarded it as their favourite film. The same year, he appeared in The Wind and the Lion opposite Candice Bergen who played Eden Pedecaris (based on the real-life Perdicaris incident), and in 1976 played Robin Hood in Robin and Marian opposite Audrey Hepburn, who played Maid Marian. The film critic Roger Ebert, who had praised the double act of Connery and Caine in The Man Who Would Be King, praised Connery's chemistry with Hepburn, writing: "Connery and Hepburn seem to have arrived at a tacit understanding between themselves about their characters. They glow. They really do seem in love".

In the 1970s Connery was part of ensemble casts in films such as Murder on the Orient Express (1974) with Vanessa Redgrave and John Gielgud, and played a British Army general in Richard Attenborough's war film A Bridge Too Far (1977), co-starring Dirk Bogarde and Laurence Olivier. In 1974, he starred in John Boorman's sci-fi thriller Zardoz. Often called one of the "weirdest and worst movies ever made" it featured Connery in a scarlet mankini – a revealing costume which generated much controversy for its un-Bond-like appearance. Despite being panned by critics at the time, the film has developed a cult following since its release. In the audio commentary to the film, Boorman relates how Connery would write poetry in his free time, describing him as "a man of great depth and intelligence" and possessing the "most extraordinary memory". In 1981, Connery appeared in the film Time Bandits as Agamemnon. The casting choice derives from a joke Michael Palin included in the script, which describes the character's removing his mask and being "Sean Connery – or someone of equal but cheaper stature". When shown the script, Connery was happy to play the supporting role. In 1981 he portrayed Marshal William T. O'Niel in the science fiction thriller Outland. In 1982, Connery narrated G'olé!, the official film of the 1982 FIFA World Cup. That same year, he was offered the role of Daddy Warbucks in Annie, going as far as taking voice lessons for the John Huston musical before turning down the part.

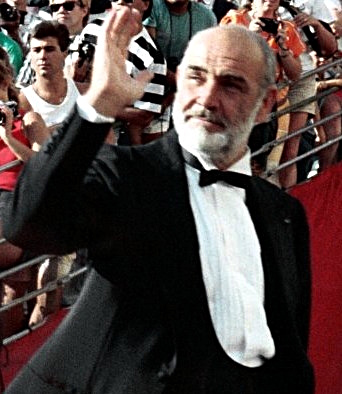
Connery at the 1988 Academy Awards

Connery agreed to reprise Bond in Never Say Never Again, released in October 1983. The title, contributed by his wife, refers to his earlier statement that he would "never again" return to the role. Although the film performed well at the box office, it was plagued with production problems: strife between the director and producer, financial problems, the Fleming estate trustees' attempts to halt the film, and Connery's wrist being broken by the fight choreographer, Steven Seagal. As a result of his negative experiences during filming, Connery became unhappy with the major studios and did not make any films for two years. Following the successful European production The Name of the Rose (1986), for which he won a BAFTA Award for Best Actor, Connery's interest in more commercial material was revived. That same year, a supporting role in Highlander showcased his ability to play older mentors to younger leads, which became a recurring role in many of his later films.

=== 1987–2006 ===
In 1987 Connery starred in Brian De Palma's The Untouchables, where he played a hard-nosed Irish-American cop alongside Kevin Costner's Eliot Ness. The film also starred Charles Martin Smith, Patricia Clarkson, Andy Garcia, and Robert De Niro as Al Capone. The film was a critical and box-office success. Many critics praised Connery for his performance, including Roger Ebert, who wrote: "The best performance in the movie is Connery ... [he] brings a human element to his character; he seems to have had an existence apart from the legend of the Untouchables, and when he's onscreen we can believe, briefly, that the Prohibition Era was inhabited by people, not caricatures". For his performance, Connery received a BAFTA nomination and won the Golden Globe Award for Best Supporting Actor and the Academy Award for Best Supporting Actor.

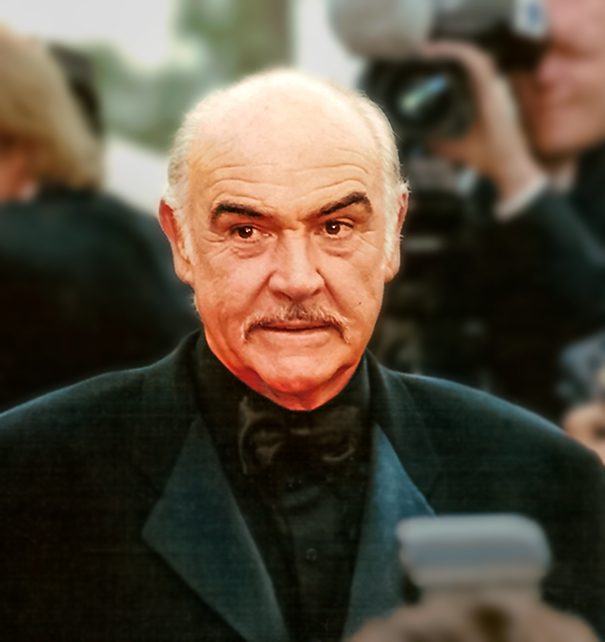
Connery in 1999

Connery starred in Steven Spielberg's Indiana Jones and the Last Crusade (1989), playing Henry Jones Sr., the father of Indiana Jones, and received BAFTA and Golden Globe nominations. Harrison Ford said Connery's contributions at the writing stage enhanced the film. "It was amazing for me in how far he got into the script and went after exploiting opportunities for character. His suggestions to George [Lucas] at the writing stage really gave the character and the picture a lot more complexity and value than it had in the original screenplay". His subsequent box-office hits included The Hunt for Red October (1990), The Rock (1996), and Entrapment (1999). In 1996, he voiced the role of Draco the dragon in the film Dragonheart. He also appeared in a brief cameo as King Richard the Lionheart at the end of Robin Hood: Prince of Thieves (1991). In 1998, Connery received the BAFTA Fellowship, a lifetime achievement award from the British Academy of Film and Television Arts.

Connery's later films included several box-office and critical disappointments such as First Knight, Just Cause (both 1995), The Avengers (1998), and The League of Extraordinary Gentlemen (2003); however, he received positive reviews for his performance in Finding Forrester (2000). He also received a Crystal Globe for outstanding artistic contribution to world cinema. In a 2003 UK poll conducted by Channel 4, Connery was ranked eighth on its list of the 100 Greatest Movie Stars. The failure of The League of Extraordinary Gentlemen was especially frustrating for Connery. He sensed during shooting that the production was "going off the rails", and announced that the director, Stephen Norrington, "would have been arrested for insanity". Connery spent considerable effort in trying to salvage the film through the editing process, ultimately deciding to retire from acting rather than go through such stress ever again.

Connery turned down the role of Gandalf in The Lord of the Rings films, saying he did not understand the script. He was reportedly offered US$30 million along with 15% of the worldwide box office receipts, which would have earned him US$450 million. He also turned down the opportunity to appear as Albus Dumbledore in the Harry Potter series and the Architect in The Matrix trilogy. In 2005, he recorded voiceovers for the From Russia with Love video game and provided his likeness. Connery said he was happy the producers, Electronic Arts, had approached him to voice Bond.

=== Retirement ===
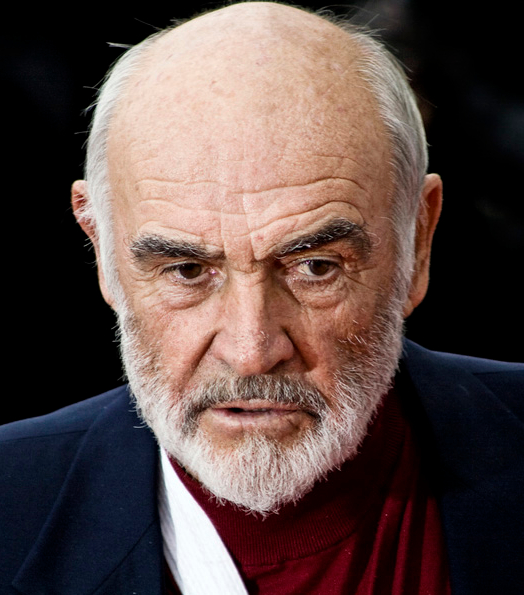
Connery at the Edinburgh Film Festival in 2008

When receiving the American Film Institute's Lifetime Achievement Award on 8 June 2006, Connery confirmed his retirement from acting. This was because he had become disillusioned with the "idiots now making films in Hollywood". On 7 June 2007 Connery denied rumours that he would appear in the Indiana Jones and the Kingdom of the Crystal Skull film, saying "retirement is just too much damned fun". In 2010 a bronze bust sculpture of him was placed in Tallinn, Estonia, outside the Scottish Club, whose membership includes Estonian Scotophiles and a handful of expatriate Scots. In 2012 he briefly came out of retirement to voice Sir Billi in the Scottish animated film Sir Billi. Connery served as executive producer for an expanded 80-minute version. The film received negative reviews.

== Personal life ==
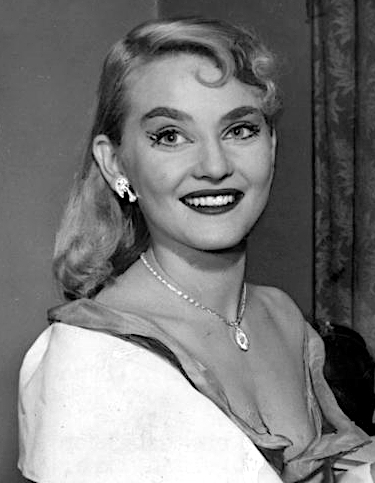
Connery's first wife Diane Cilento in 1954

During the production of South Pacific in the mid-1950s, Connery dated a Jewish "dark-haired beauty with a ballerina's figure", Carol Sopel, but was warned off by her family. He then dated Julie Hamilton, daughter of documentary filmmaker and feminist Jill Craigie. Given Connery's rugged appearance and rough charm, Hamilton initially thought he was an appalling person and was not attracted to him until she saw him in a kilt, declaring him to be the most beautiful thing she had ever seen in her life. He also shared a mutual attraction with jazz singer Maxine Daniels, whom he met while working in theatre. He made a pass at her, but she told him she was already happily married with a daughter.

Connery was married to the Australian actress Diane Cilento from 1962 to 1973, though they separated in 1971. They had a son, the actor Jason Connery. Connery illustrated the cover of Cilento's 1967 novel: The Manipulator. In the early 1970s, Connery dated Dyan Cannon, Jill St. John, Lana Wood, Carole Mallory, and Magda Konopka. In her 2006 autobiography, Cilento alleged that he had abused her mentally and physically during their relationship. In 1965, Playboy quoted Connery saying, "I don't think there is anything particularly wrong in hitting a woman, though I don't recommend you do it in the same way you hit a man". He was also reported to have stated to Vanity Fair in 1993, "There are women who take it to the wire. That's what they are looking for, the ultimate confrontation. They want a smack". In 2006, Connery disavowed the previous quotes about striking women, claiming to have been quoted out of context and insisting that "I don't believe that any level of abuse of women is ever justified under any circumstances. Full stop".

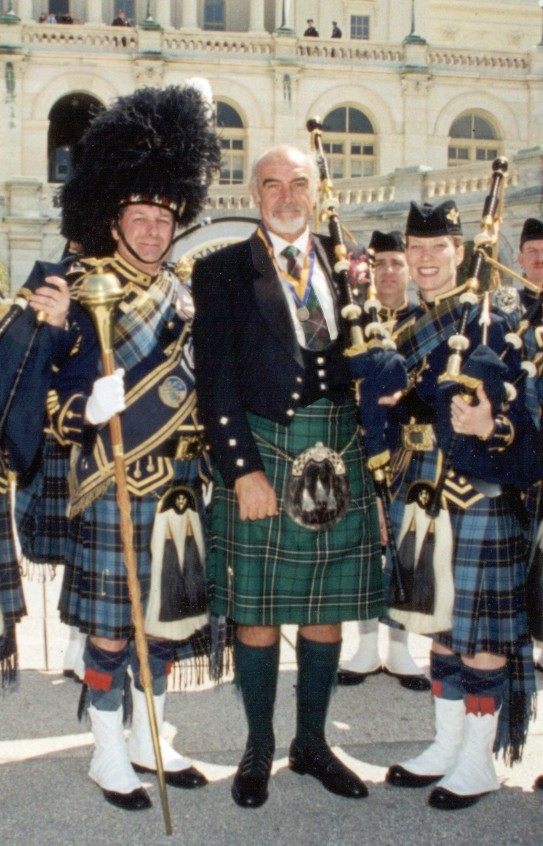
Connery at a Tartan Day celebration in Washington, D.C. When knighted by Queen Elizabeth II in 2000, he wore a green-and-black hunting tartan kilt of his mother's Clan Maclean.

Connery was married to the French-Moroccan painter Micheline Roquebrune (born 4 April 1929) from 1975 until his death. The marriage survived a well-documented affair Connery had in the late 1980s with the singer and songwriter Lynsey de Paul, which she later regretted due to his views concerning domestic violence.

Connery owned the Domaine de Terre Blanche in the South of France from 1979. He sold it to the German billionaire businessman Dietmar Hopp in 1999. He was awarded an honorary rank of Shodan (1st dan) in Kyokushin karate. Connery relocated to the Bahamas in the 1990s; he owned a mansion in Lyford Cay on New Providence.

Connery was knighted by Queen Elizabeth II at an investiture ceremony at Holyrood Palace in Edinburgh on 5 July 2000. He had been nominated for a knighthood in 1997 and 1998, but these nominations were reportedly vetoed by Donald Dewar owing to Connery's political views. Connery had a villa in Kranidi, Greece. His neighbour was King Willem-Alexander of the Netherlands, with whom he shared a helicopter platform. Michael Caine (who co-starred with Connery in The Man Who Would Be King in 1975) was among Connery's closest friends.

Growing up, Connery supported the Scottish football club Celtic F.C., having been introduced to the club by his father who was a lifelong fan of the team. Later in life, Connery switched his loyalty to Celtic's bitter rival, Rangers F.C., after he became close friends with the team's chairman, David Murray. He was a keen golfer, introduced to the game by his friend Iain Stewart. The English professional golfer Peter Alliss gave Connery golf lessons before the filming of the 1964 James Bond film Goldfinger, which involved a scene where Connery, as Bond, played golf against the gold magnate Auric Goldfinger at Stoke Park Golf Club in Buckinghamshire. The golf scene saw him wear a Slazenger v-neck sweater, a brand which Connery became associated with while playing golf in his free time, with a light grey marl being a favoured colour. The record major championship winner and golf course designer Jack Nicklaus said, "He loved the game of golf – Sean was a pretty darn good golfer! – and we played together several times. In May 1993, Sean and legendary driver Jackie Stewart helped me open our design of the PGA Centenary Course at Gleneagles in Scotland".

=== Political views ===
Connery's Scottish roots and his experiences in filming in Glasgow's shipyards in 1966 inspired him to become a member of the centre-left Scottish National Party (SNP), which supports Scottish independence from the United Kingdom (in 2011, Connery said "The Bowler and the Bunnet was just the beginning of a journey that would lead to my long association with the Scottish National Party"). Connery supported the party both financially and through personal appearances. In 1967, he wrote to George Leslie, the SNP candidate in the 1967 Glasgow Pollok by-election, saying, "I am convinced that with our resources and skills we are more than capable of building a prosperous, vigorous and modern self-governing Scotland in which we can all take pride and which will deserve the respect of other nations." His funding of the SNP ceased in 2001, when the British Parliament passed legislation prohibiting overseas funding of political activities in the United Kingdom.

=== Tax status ===
In response to accusations that he was a tax exile, Connery released documents in 2003 showing he had paid £3.7 million in UK taxes between 1997 and 1998 and between 2002 and 2003; critics pointed out that had he been continuously residing in the UK for tax purposes, his tax rate would have been far higher. In the run-up to the 2014 Scottish independence referendum, Connery's brother Neil said Connery would not come to Scotland to rally independence supporters, since his tax exile status greatly limited the number of days he could spend in the country.

After Connery sold his Marbella villa in 1999, Spanish authorities launched a tax evasion investigation, alleging that the Spanish treasury had been defrauded of £5.5 million. Connery was subsequently cleared by officials, but his wife and 16 others were charged with attempting to defraud the Spanish treasury.

== Death and legacy ==
Connery died in his sleep on 31 October 2020, aged 90, at his home in the Lyford Cay community of Nassau in the Bahamas. His death was announced by his family and Eon Productions; although they did not disclose the cause of death, his son Jason said he had been unwell for some time. A day later, his widow revealed he had dementia in his final years. Connery's death certificate was obtained by TMZ a month after his death, showing the cause of death was pneumonia and respiratory failure, and the time of death was listed as 1:30 am. His remains were cremated. The ashes were scattered in Scotland at undisclosed locations in 2022.

Following the announcement of his death, many co-stars and figures from the entertainment industry paid tribute to Connery, including Sam Neill, Nicolas Cage, Robert De Niro, Michael Bay, Tippi Hedren, Alec Baldwin, Hugh Jackman, George Lucas, Shirley Bassey, Kevin Costner, Arnold Schwarzenegger, Catherine Zeta-Jones, Barbra Streisand, John Cleese, Jane Seymour and Harrison Ford, as well as the former Bond stars George Lazenby, Timothy Dalton, Pierce Brosnan and Daniel Craig, and the family of the late Roger Moore. Connery's longtime friend Michael Caine called him a "great star, brilliant actor and a wonderful friend". The James Bond producers Michael G. Wilson and Barbara Broccoli released a statement saying Connery had "revolutionized the world with his gritty and witty portrayal of the sexy and charismatic secret agent. He is undoubtedly largely responsible for the success of the film series and we shall be forever grateful to him".

In 2004, a poll in the UK Sunday Herald recognised Connery as "The Greatest Living Scot" and a 2011 EuroMillions survey named him "Scotland's Greatest Living National Treasure". He was voted by People magazine as the "Sexiest Man Alive" in 1989 and the "Sexiest Man of the Century" in 1999. If the non-Eon Bond movie Never Say Never Again is included, Connery shares the record for the most portrayals as James Bond with Roger Moore (with seven apiece). In June 1965, Time magazine observed "James Bond has developed into the biggest mass-cult hero of the decade".

In 2024, the Edinburgh International Film Festival established an annual award in Connery's honour. The Sean Connery Prize for Feature Filmmaking Excellence is a prize of £50,000 given to the makers of a film chosen by audience vote from a short-list of ten feature films that receive their world premieres at the festival each year.

== Awards and honours ==
Year	Award	Category	Project	Result	Ref.
1987	Academy Awards	Best Supporting Actor	The Untouchables	Won	
1987	British Academy Film Awards	Best Actor in a Leading Role	The Name of the Rose	Won	
1987	British Academy Film Awards	Best Actor in a Supporting Role	The Untouchables	Nominated	
1989	British Academy Film Awards	Best Actor in a Supporting Role	Indiana Jones and the Last Crusade	Nominated	
1990	British Academy Film Awards	Best Actor in a Leading Role	The Hunt for Red October	Nominated	
1998	British Academy Film Awards	BAFTA Fellowship	—N/a	Honoured	
1965	Golden Globe Awards	Henrietta Award (World Film Favorite – Male)	—N/a	Nominated	
1968	Golden Globe Awards	Henrietta Award (World Film Favorite – Male)	—N/a	Nominated	
1972	Golden Globe Awards	Henrietta Award (World Film Favorite – Male)	—N/a	Won	
1987	Golden Globe Awards	Best Supporting Actor – Motion Picture	The Untouchables	Won	
1989	Golden Globe Awards	Best Supporting Actor – Motion Picture	Indiana Jones and the Last Crusade	Nominated	
1995	Golden Globe Awards	Cecil B. DeMille Award	—N/a	Honoured	
1998	Tony Awards	Best Play	Art	Won	

Honours

- 1987: Commander of the Order of Arts and Letters from France
- 1999: Kennedy Center Honors
- 2000: Received Knighthood from Queen Elizabeth II
- 2005: European Film Awards Lifetime Achievement Award
- 2006: AFI Life Achievement Award

== Bibliography ==
- Bray, Christopher (2010). Sean Connery: The Measure of a Man. Faber & Faber.
- Broccoli, Albert R.; Zec, Donald (1999). When the Snow Melts: The Autobiography of Cubby Broccoli. Trans-Atlantic Publications.
- Cohen, Susan; Cohen, Daniel (1985). Hollywood Hunks and Heroes. New York: Exeter Books. p. 33. ISBN 978-0-671-07528-6. OCLC 12644589.
- Cork, John; Scivally, Bruce (2002). James Bond: The Legacy. London: Boxtree. ISBN 978-0-7522-6498-1.
- Sellers, Robert (1999). Sean Connery: A Celebration. Robert Hale. ISBN 978-0-7090-6125-0.
- Yule, Andrew (1992). Sean Connery: Neither Shaken Nor Stirred. Little, Brown Book Group. ISBN 978-0-7515-4097-0.
