= TowerBrook Capital Partners =

American investment management firm

TowerBrook Capital Partners L.P.
- Type: Limited partnership
- Industry: Investment management
- Predecessor: Soros Private Equity
- Founded: April 2005
- Headquarters: London and New York City
- Number of locations: London, New York City, Madrid, Frankfurt
- Areas served: North America, Europe
- Key people: Neal Moszkowski (Founder and Chair); Jonathan Bilzin (co-CEO); Karim Saddi (CFO)
- Products: Private equity funds, structured opportunities funds
- AUM: USD$25 billion
- Number of employees: 102
- Website: www.towerbrook.com

TowerBrook Capital Partners, L.P. is an investment management firm headquartered in London and New York City. TowerBrook spun out of Soros Fund Management in 2005 and became known for acquiring majority stakes in companies such as Jimmy Choo. Managing $25+ billion in a number of private equity funds and structured opportunities funds, TowerBrook listed 110 investments on its website as of 2025.

== History ==
=== 2005 and prior ===
TowerBrook Capital Partners was formed as a spin-off of George Soros' equity management firm. TowerBrook's co-founders, Neal Moszkowski and Ramez Sousou, had previously served as co-heads of Soros Fund Management's private equity arm, Soros Private Equity (SPEP); SPEP launched its first fund around 2000. SPEP was also an early investor in companies such as Eircom, CSTV Networks, and Cablecom, which it sold to Liberty Global in 2005. In April 2005, Moszkowski and Sousou spun out SPEP from Soros Fund Management to establish TowerBrook Capital Partners in New York and London.

=== 2006–2013 ===
TowerBrook closed its TowerBrook Investors II LP fund at $1.3 billion in March 2006, with George Soros contributing a significant amount. Later that month, the fund purchased 67% of French engineering company GSE, which had an estimated value of €230 million. In 2006, TowerBrook purchased 75% of the St. Louis Blues National Hockey League team for $150 million, also then purchasing the lease of the Scottrade Center in St. Louis, Missouri. The purchase made TowerBrook "the only private equity firm to own a share in a professional sports team," according to Sports Business Daily. Also in 2006, TowerBrook raised $850 million from the sale of WellCare Health Plans, and a further $160 million from the disposal of Tradedoubler. After acquisition of clothing company Odlo in 2006, in 2007 TowerBrook purchased the designer shoe company Jimmy Choo for £180 million. In 2007, it invested in U.S. company Sound Inpatient Physicians.

In 2008, TowerBrook raised $2.8 billion from investors for its third fund. According to Financial Times, the successful fundraising during a difficult economic period was noted as reflecting TowerBrook's sharp decline in its investing pace during a credit boom, while keeping debt for new investments "below the market average." The fund's first deal was in 2009, when TowerBrook acquired 60% of Autodistribution Group for $139 million, selling the stake six years later to Bain Capital. In 2009, TowerBrook founded Haymarket Financial, or HayFin, initially as a corporate lender for small and medium businesses. Investors, including Sunseeker, Ronald Mourad Cohen, Lord Rothschild, and Future Fund, invested a total of $580 million in HayFin in September 2010, raising the lender's equity to about €1 billion. TowerBrook sold its stake in HayFin in 2017. In 2010, Towerbrook acquired the building company Monier and sold Broadlane Group for $850 million.

TowerBrook purchased the fashion retailer Phase Eight for £80 million in February 2011. Three months later, TowerBrook sold Jimmy Choo, for a reported £500 million. In 2012, TowerBrook sold part of its stake in the St. Louis Blues to a consortium of investors, retaining a stake of around 50%. Also in 2012, TowerBrook acquired a majority interest in the professional coaching business Vistage International. In 2013, Towerbrook acquired scrap refiner Metallum for £295 million and True Religion Apparel for $835 million. That year, the company also sold Rave Cinemas to Cinemark. In early 2013, The Financial Times wrote that TowerBrook was "defying a depressed fundraising market" by raising $3.5 billion for its new fund, TowerBrook Investors IV. Originally targeted at $3 billion, Fund IV became "considerably oversubscribed", receiving subscriptions of over $5 billion.

=== 2014–2020 ===
In 2014, TowerBrook acquired Independent Clinical Services from The Blackstone Group for $408 million. In June of that year, TowerBrook portfolio company Volution Group completed an initial public offering (IPO) on the London Stock Exchange, diluting TowerBrook’s stake from 85% to 61%. In 2015, TowerBrook sold Phase Eight, then valued at £300 million, to the Foschini Group of South Africa, and sold a 10% stake in itself to Wafra Investment Advisory Group "to free up capital to spend on the business." In November 2015 TowerBrook secured over $800 million for its new TowerBrook Structured Opportunities Fund, exceeding its initial target of $600 million. Also in 2015, Towerbrook purchased American Apparel business J.Jill for around $400 million, and acquired a stake in U.S.-based Accretive Health for $200 million. In March 2016, TowerBrook sold the majority of Van Geloven, a Dutch snack maker it had acquired the previous year, to McCain Foods. In April 2016, TowerBrook announced it was partnering with U.S.-based health system Ascension Health Alliance to develop Ascension's healthcare technology business TRIMEDX. By that summer, the firm had raised a total of $9.4 billion from investors in four private equity funds and one structured opportunities fund, designed to allow the firm to make minority investments.

The firm completed eight investments in 2017, including purchasing 47% of the aerospace company Aernova and acquisition of loyalty services business Rewards Network. TowerBrook retained 50% of J.Jill stock when taking it public on the New York Stock Exchange in March 2017. Several months later, True Religion filed for bankruptcy protection, stating that TowerBrook would "swap debt into equity, handing them majority control." The bankruptcy plan was approved by the courts in October 2017, with True Religion's debt cut by $354 million.

In June 2018, $4.25 billion was raised for a new Towerbrook buyout fund, Towerbrook Investors V. $1.05 billion was also raised for a Structured Opportunities Fund. In 2018 and 2019, TowerBrook made significant investments in Validity Finance, GBA Group, Orchid Underwriters and Studio Movie Grill. TowerBrook listed 30 active investments on its website in 2020, among them KeHe Distributors, BevMo!, and OVH. In 2019, Towerbrook became the first "mainstream private-equity shop" to be certified as a B corporation. In October 2019 it was reported that TowerBrook and Ascension Health were co-investing in the hospice company Compassus through Ascension TowerBrook Healthcare Opportunities (ATHO), a new joint venture. In February 2020, the company was researching a sale of Independent Clinical Services.

== Business model ==
TowerBrook operates three fund types: private equity, growth equity, and structured opportunities. TowerBrook's website states that its private equity strategy is "based on the focused, proprietary sourcing of selected, control-oriented" investments in large and midsize companies, where the firm has “identified scope for significant further improvement and value creation." The firm's Structured Opportunities Funds make minority investments in a range of businesses, "principally via structured asset and structured equity investments." The firm publishes an annual "Responsible Ownership Report", and is a signatory to the United Nations Principles for Responsible Investment Initiative (PRI). Towerbrook is a certified B Corporation.

== Locations ==
TowerBrook is co-headquartered in London, England, and New York City.

== Key people ==
The firm is led by its founders, Neal Moszkowski, and Ramez Sousou, who are its co-chairs and co-CEOs and are based in New York and London, respectively.

== Philanthropy ==
The TowerBrook Foundation is a charitable organization established by the partners of the firm in 2006. It has donated to nonprofits such as City Year and Habitat for Humanity.

== See also ==
- List of private equity firms
- List of companies based in London
- List of companies based in New York City
