= R1 RCM =

U.S. healthcare company

R1 RCM Inc.
- Formerly: Accretive Health, Inc.
- Company type: Private
- Traded as: Nasdaq: RCM (until 2024) S&P 400 component (until 2024)
- Founded: 2003; 23 years ago
- Founders: Mary Tolan; Michael Cline
- Headquarters: Murray, Utah, U.S.
- Key people: Joe Flanagan (CEO)
- Services: pre-registration; financial clearance; charge capture; coding; billing and follow-up; underpayments; denials management
- Owners: TowerBrook Capital Partners; Clayton, Dubilier & Rice
- Number of employees: 30,000 (2023)
- Website: www.r1rcm.com

R1 RCM Inc. is an American 'revenue cycle management' company servicing hospitals, health systems and physician groups across the United States. In November 2024, TowerBrook Capital Partners and Clayton, Dubilier & Rice completed the purchase of R1, in a deal that valued the company at $8.9 billion.

== Overview ==
RCM is the process of managing all revenue-generation functions in a healthcare organization. It requires an understanding of the revenue cycle and begins when a patient seeks the organization's medical services and ends when the organization has collected all payments from the patient and/or their insurer.

The firm employs more than 27,200 people and generates approximately $2.1 billion in annual revenue. R1 has over 1,000 clients across the United States, including hospitals, health systems, and physician groups.

== History ==
Previous logo

R1 RCM was founded as Accretive Health in 2003 by Mary Tolan and Michael Cline. Tolan served as the company's president, chief executive officer, and board director until 2013. Cline served as board chairman between 2009 and 2013.

In 2012, responding to a Senate inquiry, the company stated that nine thefts of patient data-bearing company laptops had occurred in 2011, and that 30 company laptops had lacked encryption. As a consequence, in 2013, Accretive Health entered into a 20-year settlement with the Federal Trade Commission over its data security measures.

In July 2012, Accretive Health entered into a $2.5 million settlement with the Minnesota Attorney General following an investigation into the company's debt collection practices. The company admitted no wrongdoing. Accretive Health was barred from operating in Minnesota for two to six years under a settlement agreement announced July 30, 2012 by Minnesota Attorney General Lori Swanson.

After stepping down as CEO in April 2013, Mary Tolan was succeeded in the position by the former Dell executive Stephen Schuckenbrock. In March 2014, as a result of missed financial restatements, Accretive Health was delisted from the New York Stock Exchange; over-the-counter trading continued.

On July 21, 2014, Emad Rizk replaced Schuckenbrock as CEO. In December, the company restated certain previously filed financial statements and, in June 2015, announced that they had completed their 2014 SEC filings; the firm filed its 2015 Q2 10-Q with the SEC in August 2015. In 2015, Ascension selected Accretive Health as its exclusive hospital revenue cycle partner. As part of the transaction, Ascension and TowerBrook Capital Partners invested $200M to support growth initiatives at Accretive Health.

In 2017, Accretive Health was renamed as R1 RCM. In the middle of the same year, it announced a further expansion of the agreement with Ascension to include an additional $1.5B in net patient revenue handled, which included physician group revenue cycle services.

In August 2020, after acquiring the RevWorks line of business from Cerner Corporation, the company was hit with a ransomware attack.

On October 16, 2023, Jehoshaphat Research published a report alleging, among other things, that RCM's “revenues and profits are grossly overstated,” that certain reported revenue growth has been “derived from inputs based on assumptions about future collections” which will eventually “collapse,” and that the company's revenue is “chronically inflated.” The report also points out that RCM has “recently seen the departures of the CEO, CFO, CCO and CSO,” which “speak to the risks [that] have surfaced.”

In December 2023, R1 RCM settled a stockholder's litigation lawsuit in which it was charged that the company breached their fiduciary duties. The amount of the settlement was $45,400,000 in cash.

In March 2024, R1 RCM Inc. filed a notice of data breach with the Attorney General of Massachusetts after discovering that an unauthorized party was able to access confidential information belonging to certain consumers. In this notice, R1 explains that the incident resulted in an unauthorized party being able to access consumers’ names, contact information, dates of birth, Social Security numbers, locations of services, clinical information, diagnosis information, patient account numbers and medical record numbers. Upon completing its investigation, R1 began sending out data breach notification letters to all individuals whose information was affected by the recent data security incident.
