= Cost of Living (Rick Wakeman album) =

Studio album by Rick Wakeman
- Released: 23 September 1983
- Recorded: 1982–83
- Genre: Hard rock, progressive rock
- Length: 36:09
- Label: Charisma; Voiceprint (reissue)
- Producer: Rick Wakeman

Rick Wakeman chronology
| Rock 'n' Roll Prophet (1982) | Cost of Living (1983) | G'olé! (1983) |

Alternative cover
- 1991 reissue.

Professional ratings
Review scores
| Source | Rating |
|---|---|
| AllMusic | 3/5 stars |

Cost of Living is a progressive rock album released in 1983 by British keyboard player Rick Wakeman. Actor Robert Powell provided narration on the last track of the album.

The track on the album called "Gone but Not Forgotten" was played at a memorial service for Countdown host Richard Whiteley shortly after his death. The voice at the very start of "Bedtime Stories" is that of Rick Wakeman's son (Benjamin). He was three years old at the time of the recording.

== Track listing ==
All music by Rick Wakeman; all lyrics by Tim Rice

Side one
| No. | Title | Length |
|---|---|---|
| 1. | "Twij" | 1:20 |
| 2. | "Pandamonia" | 3:58 |
| 3. | "Gone but Not Forgotten" | 3:43 |
| 4. | "One for the Road" | 4:44 |
| 5. | "Bedtime Stories" | 4:23 |

Side two
| No. | Title | Length |
|---|---|---|
| 1. | "Happening Man" | 3:35 |
| 2. | "Shakespeare Run" | 3:27 |
| 3. | "Monkey Nuts" | 3:26 |
| 4. | "Elegy – Written in a Country Churchyard" | 8:24 |

Rick's Perspective Notes "Another nearly album. It has too much variation within the music for me to be really happy about it and again I ended up in a studio that I really didn't like that was picked by the record company at the time and so I couldn't change. There's a mixture of great playing and some very poor playing as well. Most disappointing is the piano sound as the piano in the studio was cheap and nasty. There are a couple of classic tracks on the album though such as 'Happening Man' which I would love to re-record one day."

== Personnel ==
- Rick Wakeman – keyboards
- Hereward Kaye – vocals
- Jackie McAuley – guitar
- John Gustafson – bass
- Robert Powell – narration
- Tony Fernandez – drums, percussion

Technical

- Ken Thomas, Mike Stent – engineer
