= Vent-Axia =

- Company type: Private limited company
- Industry: Manufacturing
- Founded: 28 January 1933; 93 years ago in London, England
- Headquarters: Manor Royal, Crawley, England
- Products: Mechanical fans, heating and air conditioning units
- Parent: Volution Group
- Website: www.vent-axia.com

Vent-Axia is a British manufacturer of ventilation, heating and air conditioning equipment, located in Manor Royal, Crawley, West Sussex.

== History ==
The company was originally incorporated on 28 January 1933, and as Vent-Axia Limited private company on 4 April 1936, to produce and sell ventilation equipment. During the Second World War, the company made fans for 10 Downing Street.

In 1946, the company acquired a new factory in Putney with 18,000 square feet (1,700 m^{2}) of floor space. The following year, Vent-Axia became a public company with shareholders. In 1957, the company, along with subsidiary Axia Fans, agreed a 99-year lease on a new 4.5-acre (1.8 ha) site at Manor Royal in Crawley. The company was acquired by the Hall Thermotank Ltd Group and later was sold to Smiths Group in 1992, and became part of Volution Group when it was formed in 2002.
