= Rock 'n' Roll Prophet =

Rock n' Roll Prophet

Studio album by Rick Wakeman
- Released: December 1982
- Recorded: 1979
- Studio: Mountain, Montreux, Switzerland
- Genre: Progressive pop, synth-pop, novelty
- Label: Moon
- Producer: Rick Wakeman

Rick Wakeman chronology
1984 (1981)	Rock n' Roll Prophet (1982)	Cost of Living (1983)

Singles from Rock n' Roll Prophet
- 1. "I'm So Straight I'm A Weirdo" Released: February 1980 (UK)

Rock n' Roll Prophet is a 1982 album by English musician Rick Wakeman. The album was recorded at Mountain Studios in Montreux, Switzerland, and was released by Moon Records.

== Production ==
As well as playing keyboards, Wakeman provided lead vocals for three tracks ("I'm So Straight I'm a Weirdo", "Maybe '80" and "Do You Believe in Fairies") – the only album on which his singing appears besides Rhapsodies, which features his singing on the opening song "Pedra De Gavea". Due to his association with progressive rock (being the antithesis of then-popular punk rock), Wakeman wanted the album to be released under a pseudonym – his suggestion being "KUDOS". It was, however, released under his own name, which he called "a big mistake".

The album was re-released in 1991 by President Records as Rock 'n' Roll Prophet Plus, containing four bonus tracks. These tracks were recorded at Wakeman's own Bajanor Studios on the Isle of Man, and were mixed by Stuart Sawney. The re-release was mastered at Abbey Road Studios.

== Critical reception ==
Professional ratings
Review scores
Source	Rating
AllMusic	2/5 stars

Rock 'n' Roll Prophet has gained largely negative reviews, with comments describing the album as "goofy", "novelty" and "crap". McGlinchey does, however, recognise that the album was largely produced as a tongue-in-cheek project and that "the humour on [the] release is intentional".

AllMusic described the album as sounding similar to the Buggles, with Wakeman corroborating their influence by stating that the album was an attempted spoof. Wakeman's vocals are also described as "serviceable but not strong" – with the instrumentals "not up to [his] highest standards". Ground and Sky likened the album to "someone gleefully pressing the self-destruct button on whatever credibility they previously had managed to accrue as a music artist."

Wakeman, however, has commented that he likes the analogue sounds and production on the album, and that the album was "little ahead of its time [and] a little off the wall".

== Track listing ==
All tracks composed by Rick Wakeman

=== Original LP ===
1. "I'm So Straight I'm a Weirdo" – 3:54
2. "The Dragon" – 3:34
3. "Dark" – 5:07
4. "Maybe '80" – 5:27
5. "Early Warning" – 3:34
6. "Spy of 55" – 5:07
7. "Do You Believe in Fairies?" – 4:29
8. "Rock 'n' Roll Prophet" – 4:40

=== 1991 re-release ===
1. "Return of the Prophet" – 6:03
2. "I'm So Straight I'm a Weirdo" – 3:54
3. "The Dragon" – 3:34
4. "Dark" – 5:07
5. "Alpha Sleep" – 6:00
6. "Maybe '80" – 5:27
7. "March of the Child Soldiers" – 6:05
8. "Early Warning" – 3:34
9. "Spy of 55" – 5:07
10. "Stalemate" – 5:55
11. "Do You Believe in Fairies?" – 4:29
12. "Rock 'n' Roll Prophet" – 4:40

== Personnel ==
- Rick Wakeman – keyboards, vocals, production
- Lilianne Lauber – backing vocals
- Gaston Balmer – percussion

Technical

- Dave Richards – engineering
- Martin Pursey – executive producer
- Stuart Sawney – engineering (CD bonus tracks)
- Nina Carter - cover photography
