= Frederick Charles Stewart =

Scottish industrialist (1879–1950)

Sir Frederick Charles Stewart M.I.N.A, LL.D
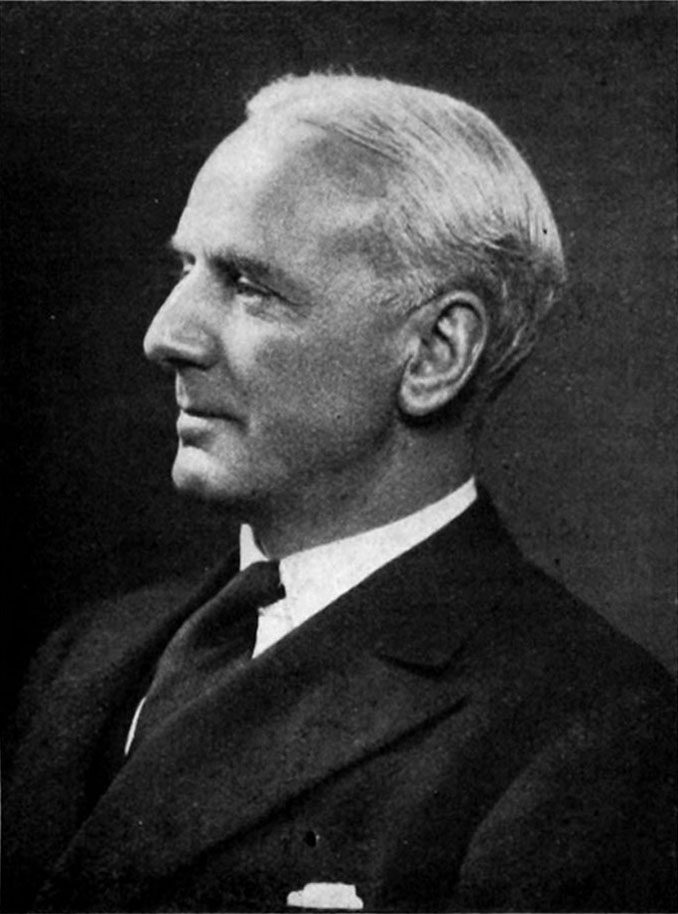
- Born: 1879; Dalmuir, Scotland
- Died: 10 March 1950 (aged 70–71); Glasgow, Scotland
- Education: High School of Glasgow
- Occupation: Electrical Engineer
- Parent(s): William Stewart, Isabella Sinclair

Frederick Charles Stewart (1879-1950) was a Scottish electrical engineer, industrialist, and patron of the arts. He was a noted benefactor and philanthropist.

He was the youngest of three brothers in Glasgow who, from 1898, revolutionised heating, cooling and ventilation in shipping, railways, aircraft and public buildings around the world.

== Early life ==
Frederick and his brother Alexander William Stewart (1865-1933) and brother William Maxwell Stewart (1874-1926) were born to coal merchant William Stewart and his wife Isabella née Sinclair. The brothers had three sisters, Christina Stewart, Helen M. Stewart and Ida S. Stewart.

His two brothers worked in the Clydebank shipyard of J&G Thomson & Co Ltd, soon to be known as John Brown & Company, while Frederick started work with his father's coal merchanting business in Dalmuir before qualifying as an electrical engineer. In 1901 they formed their own company, Thermotank, based in Glasgow and innovated methods of heating, cooling and ventilating ships of all classes, trains, and in due course aircraft to ensure fresh air and controllable temperatures efficiently for the benefit of crews, passengers and cargoes. Their client list became international.

== Business and public initiatives ==
Frederick became a founding director of the family-owned group of Thermotank companies with offices in Glasgow (its head office and main manufacturing base), London, South Africa and Canada. During World War I, he served with the 9th Argyll and Sutherland Highlanders, from which he retired with the rank of colonel in 1921. He continued his links with the Territorial Army. After Alexander's death in 1933, Frederick became chairman of the group.

Frederick Stewart's first class organising ability and foresight in long-term planning was recognised by the commercial and industrial world. He was chairman of the North British Locomotive Company, Ltd., and of Kelvin Bottomley and Baird, Ltd., deputy chairman of Brown Brothers and Co. Ltd., Edinburgh, and a director of William Baird and Co. Ltd. He was also a director of the Clydesdale Bank, Eagle Star Insurance, Bruas-Perak Rubber Estates, Clyde Confections Ltd, the three Caledonian Trust Companies, Scottish Industrial Estates Ltd and Lanarkshire Industrial Estates Ltd.

In public service he became a member of the Clyde Navigation Trust, a director of the Glasgow Chamber of Commerce, and of the Merchants House and the Trades House of Glasgow. He served on the Glasgow Committee of Lloyd's Register of Shipping and was a member of the Company of Shipwrights in London. He became President of the Institution of Shipbuilders and Engineers in Scotland for three war years from 1941 encouraging and improving education for engineers. As an acknowledgement of his services to engineering education, the University of Glasgow conferred upon him the honorary degree of LL.D.in 1946. In June 1948 he was appointed a member of the UK committee which guided the development of the Festival of Britain which opened in 1951, its main venues being London and Glasgow.

== World War II ==
Throughout World War II Frederick Stewart was the consulting ventilating engineer to the Ministry of War Transport in connection with ventilation problems on troopships with convoys worldwide. He was closely linked to Churchill's Cabinet and to the work of fellow industrialist Sir James Lithgow, the Controller of Merchant Shipbuilding. For his war-time industrial service and public service, he was created a Knight in 1944, in which year he also became a Deputy Lieutenant of Dunbartonshire.

In 1946/47 Col Sir Frederick Stewart was one of a small group of funders – including industrialists Sir James Lithgow and Sir James Caird (founder and funder of the National Maritime Museum, Greenwich) – which bought and presented to the National Trust the Chartwell home of Churchill, with life-rent going to Sir Winston and his wife Clementine.

== Benefactor ==
Sir Frederick devoted much of his time in later years to the encouragement of youth (through the Cadet Corps, Aircraft Training Corps and the Boy Scout movement), the fostering of cultural bodies, education and hospital management. He was on the governing boards of the Glasgow Western Infirmary, the Glasgow Dental Hospital, the Elder Cottage Hospital, and the Old Man's Home.

Sir Frederick made substantial donations of £20,000 towards the development of the Engineering Department at Glasgow University. Other gifts included a sum of £10,000 in 1945 to the Commonwealth Fund of the Trades House of Glasgow.

He was keenly interested in music and the arts, and the City of Glasgow benefited considerably by his generous support to the Scottish National Orchestra, and the Royal Glasgow Institute of Fine Arts. He was a benefactor to the Royal Scottish Academy of Music (today the Royal Conservatoire of Scotland).

Sir Frederick gifted £10,000 to Harry McKelvie, the retiring owner of the Royal Princess's Theatre in Gorbals to meet McKelvie's generous gift by lease of the theatre to become the home of the Citizens Theatre group - created in 1944 by playwright James Bridie (Oswald Mavor), art director Tom Honeyman and picture house owner George Singleton.

== A world traveller ==
Sir Frederick travelled extensively. He enjoyed sailing and flying. On one occasion when he had booked five seats on a plane from Milan to Croydon he had a premonition. He phoned the aerodrome to cancel his reservation and ordered the same number of seats on the following plane leaving three hours later. When he reached Croydon he learned that the earlier plane was missing. Later he read that the machine had been forced down in flames in the English Channel, with loss of life. Many times he crossed the Atlantic, and he was a passenger on the maiden voyages of the liners Queen Elizabeth, Queen Mary, Bremen, and Normandie. Sir Frederick was a member of the three Clyde yacht clubs, and was also a keen motorist. In 1934, he bought a Bentley, chassis number B93AE, thought to be the 43rd produced in Derby under Rolls-Royce ownership.

Sir Frederick was a bachelor and shared the family's home at 8 Lancaster Crescent, Great Western Road, Glasgow and at Craigrownie Castle, Cove, overlooking the Firth of Clyde, until his death in 1950, age 72.

He left personal estate in Scotland and England valued at £645,309. The Thermotank business interests - and the Bentley - passed to (Sir) Iain Maxwell Stewart, his 34-year old nephew, being the surviving son of his late brother William Maxwell Stewart.
