= Alexander William Stewart =

Scottish industrialist (1865-1933)

- Born: 6 December 1865; Peebles, Scotland
- Died: 1933; Glasgow, Scotland
- Occupations: Naval Architect & Engineer
- Parent(s): William Stewart, Isabella Sinclair

Alexander William Stewart (1865-1933) was a Scottish naval architect, engineer, and inventor of international distinction.

He was the eldest of three brothers in Glasgow who revolutionised heating, cooling and ventilation in shipping accommodation, railways, aircraft and public buildings around the world, including the Chrysler Building in New York, among many applications from 1898 onwards.

Alexander and his brothers William Maxwell Stewart (1874-1926) and (Sir) Frederick Charles Stewart (1879-1950) were born to coal master William Stewart and his wife Isabella née Sinclair. The brothers had three sisters, Christina Stewart, Helen M. Stewart and Ida S. Stewart.

The two eldest brothers worked in the Clydebank shipyard of J&G Thomson & Co Ltd, soon to be known as John Brown & Company, Alexander qualified as a member of the Institution of Naval Architects, and was the top prizeman in Britain in his final year.

He spent some time under the chief naval architect Sir John Biles, at the Clydebank yard, where as manager of the electrical department he had much to do with the first and early application of electricity to ships. His own experience at sea convinced him of the necessity of combining heating and cooling with ship ventilation, which combination was an essential principle of the Thermotank system which he designed and developed. Today, this is recognised by the term ‘air conditioning.’

In 1901 he and his brothers set up their own firm, Thermotank, based in Glasgow with works coming next to the Clyde at Govan in 1908, and later with branches and agencies overseas. Alexander became the managing director, with numerous patents to his name.

He was to become a leading member of the Institution of Electrical Engineers, and the Institution of Shipbuilders and Engineers in Scotland. In 1922 he became a Freeman of the City of London. He received from the King of Italy the honour of Knight of the Crown of Italy, in recognition of his services to Italian shipbuilding.

During WWI Stewart designed the Thermotank inductor, which enabled large volumes of poison-laden air to be dealt with without danger, particularly saving many lives in munitions factories. Another invention was the punkah louvre ventilator, which found application in both naval and mercantile ships for many countries, and for the builders of luxury liners, and in the ventilation of public buildings, railway carriages, and aeroplanes. By the 1920s and 1930s he also interested himself in the design and production of axial flow type of fans for large volumes of air or gas, at high pressure and greater efficiency.

Alexander remained unmarried and shared the family home of his brother Frederick and sisters at 8 Lancaster Crescent, Glasgow and at Craigrownie Castle, Cove, overlooking the Firth of Clyde, until his death in 1933.

On his death the Liverpool Journal of Commerce wrote:

"Like all great engineers, he had the gift of imagination, which enabled him to approach problems from new angles, and avoided the conventional ruts of ordinary practice. He was tenacious and untiring, in his pursuit of perfection in the installations and systems which he designed;, and the high standard of comfort, so far as heating and ventilation is concerned on our latest luxury liners, is largely due to Mr. Stewart's devotion to the problems associated therewith."
