= Thermotank Ltd =

Scottish engineering company founded in 1900

Thermotank was a Scottish engineering company specialising in heating, ventilation and air conditioning, founded in Glasgow in 1900 by Alexander William Stewart and his two brothers William and Frederick. The business was based on Alexander’s invention, the Thermotank, a system designed for maritime use which could maintain a constant temperature coupled to circulation of air on board ships.

In 1922, Alexander Stewart invented and patented the Punkah Louvre, a device able to control and direct the supply of air as required. The Punkah Louvre became a device recognised worldwide and was fitted in ships, trains, buildings and aircraft.

The Thermotank company became the world leader in marine air conditioning systems with equipment installed in thousands of vessels from 1898 onwards including, most notably, great ocean liners such as the Cunard Line’s RMS Lusitania and RMS Mauretania (1907), RMS Aquitania (1913), RMS Queen Mary, (1934) and RMS Queen Elizabeth (1938) and also the French Line’s SS Normandie (1932), Royal Mail’s RMS Andes (1939) P&O's SS Canberra (1961). The Thermotank system was also adopted by the British Admiralty for installation in many of its warships.

In 1959, the company merged with long standing associates and refrigeration specialists J & E Hall & Co to form Hall Thermotank Ltd.

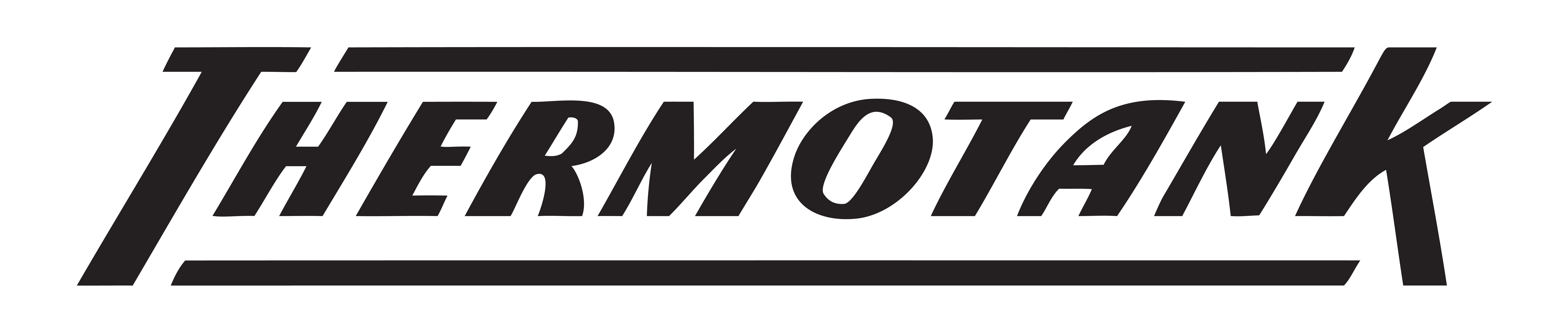
The Company logo designed in the 1950s.

== History ==
In 1897, Alexander William Stewart, head of the electrical department at shipbuilders J&G Thomson & Co, at Clydebank on the River Clyde, invented apparatus which he called the Thermotank. This was a system capable of maintaining a constant temperature inside a ship’s compartment irrespective of the outside temperature. In 1898, the first Thermotank was installed in the Russian Volunteer Fleet ship, Kostroma, which was being refitted at Thomson’s yard. This was the first time such a system had been fitted anywhere. The next three ships were: Kumano Maru, Asie and Cap Polonia.

Unlike the then standard steam pipe heating system, tests on Kostroma showed that the Thermotank system began heating immediately. In 15 minutes the temperature had risen by 11˚F and in 30 minutes to 17˚F. The compartment in question was 14,803 cu ft in extent and held 246 persons. The Thermotank also changed the air 6.9 times per hour.

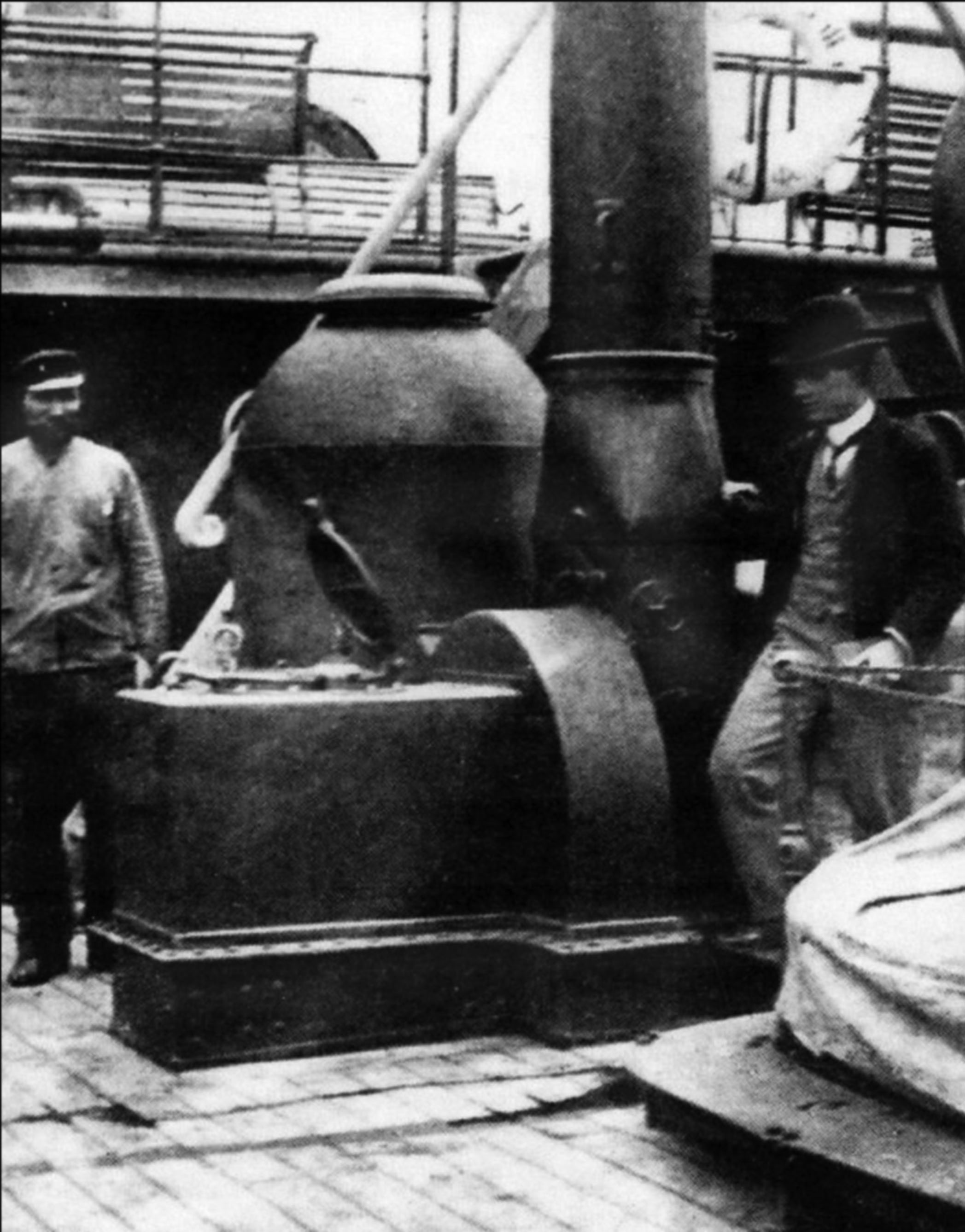
The first Thermotank installed on a ship was in the Russian Volunteer Fleet's Kostroma in 1898 at the Clydebank shipyard of J&G Thomson. Inventor Alexander William Stewart is standing at right.

In 1898, Alexander William Stewart patented his invention in the United Kingdom as ‘Improvements in ventilating and heating or cooling apparatus for use on board ship’. The patent envisaged the control of both warm and cool air, although the Thermotank installed in Kostroma delivered warm air only.

In 1900, Alexander William Stewart with his brothers William Maxwell Stewart (1875-1926) and Frederick Charles Stewart (1878-1950), established the Thermotank Ventilating Company, with offices at 55 West Regent Street, Glasgow. The Company were consultants and designers of the Thermotank system but not manufacturers.

Early in 1901, the Thermotank system was installed on the Japanese steamer Kumano Maru which was under construction at the Fairfield Shipbuilding and Engineering Company shipyard in Glasgow. The Thermotank Company considered this installation, capable of heating and cooling, to be the first marine use of air conditioning (although that term was not in use until later). The system was described by The Marine Engineer and Shipping Gazette and Lloyds List as:

The arrangements for ventilating and heating or cooling the cabins are novel and are the result of much careful thought. Four of Stewart’s patent Thermotanks, with the necessary electric fans etc., have been introduced, and work in conjunction with steel trunks led to the various compartments. Each cabin has its own adjustable louvre, so that the admission of air may be adjusted to a nicety. Its temperature may also be controlled, for a system of brine pipes from the refrigerating machine connects with the Thermotank coils, and in warm climates the circulating air may be cooled.

In 1905, the Thermotank system was selected for installation on the Cunard liners RMS Lusitania and RMS Mauretania, soon to be the largest and most prestigious ships in the world.

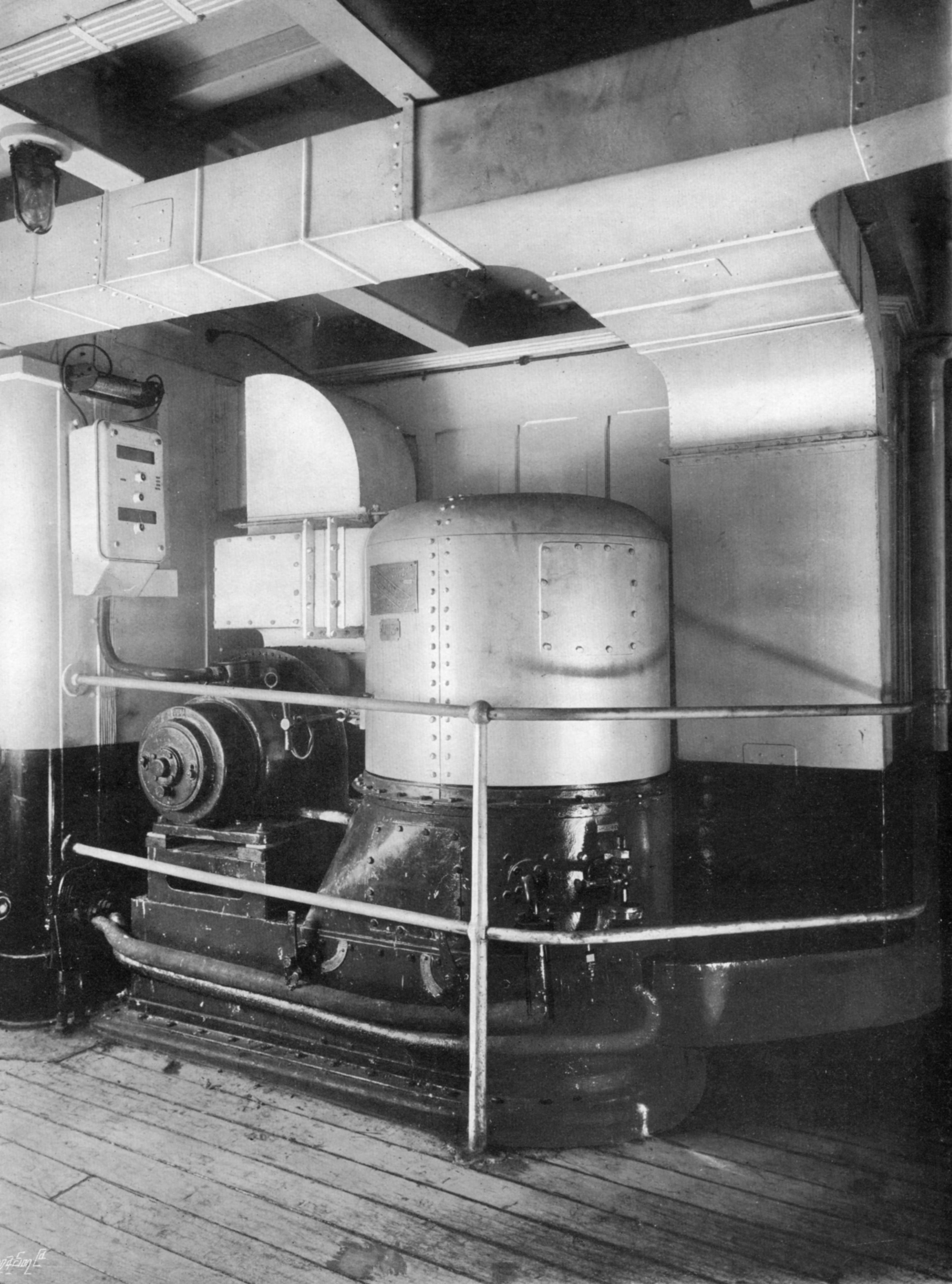
A 'tween deck' Thermotank as seen fitted onboard RMS Lusitania in 1907. Note the trunking running up from the Thermotank and across the deck head.

In 1907, the Thermotank Ventilating Company having hitherto acted as consultants and designers, acquired premises at Helen Street in Govan, Glasgow, where they began to manufacture the components of the Thermotank system as well as other heating and ventilating products.

By 1908, Thermotanks had been fitted to ships including those of the following lines: Cunard Line, Allan Line, Canadian Pacific Steamships, Lloyd Sabaudo, Midland Railway, Navigazione Generale Italiana, Great Western Railway, Egyptian Mail Steamship Co., American Line, Russian Volunteer Fleet, Nippon Yusen, Red Star Line, Holland America Line, Great Eastern Railway, White Star Line, Compagnie Générale Transatlantique, Indian Government, Fratelli Cosulic.

Thermotanks were also fitted to the British, Japanese, Russian, Italian, Brazilian, Portuguese and Argentine navies.

By 1910, according to the Shipping Gazette and Lloyds List, Thermotanks had been fitted to most of the ‘world’s high-class steamers’.

In 1920, the company changed its name to Thermotank Ltd.

== The Punkah Louvre ==
In 1922, Alexander William Stewart invented and patented the Punkah Louvre after many experiments. Prior to the introduction of the Punkah Louvre, the mechanical delivery of air to a space was made through ducting which terminated in a grill or louvre. To ensure this was achieved without undue noise and discomfort, the velocity of the air was no greater than 4 to 8 feet per second. Stewart’s Punkah Louvre, in addition to becoming one of the most ubiquitous objects of the 20th century, allowed air to be delivered at speeds of between 30 and 50 feet per second. Moreover the louvre’s nozzle allowed the air to be directed within a certain radius by hand. The Punkah Louvre was manufactured in three types, each suited to a particular kind of delivery. In basic terms, it could control the flow of air and direct it within a certain radius.

The Punkah Louvre was fitted in ships, aircraft, trains and buildings—the latter including the Chrysler Building, New York, The Savoy Hotel, London, the Meiji Insurance Building, Tokyo, House of Assembly, Cape Town and the British Museum, London. They were also fitted in the airship Graf Zeppelin. The Thermo-Reg Louvre was a development of the Punkah Louvre where the output temperature could be controlled at the louvre.

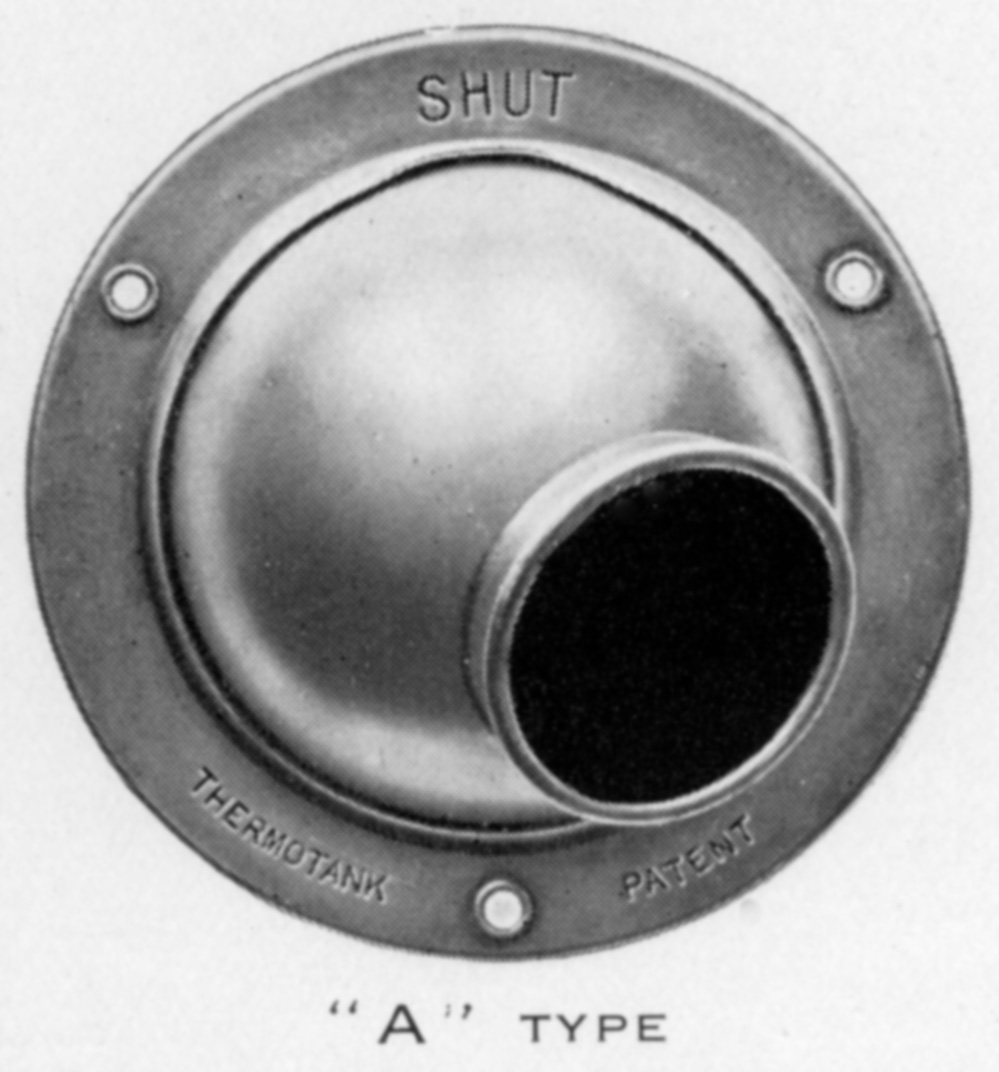
Illustration of Punkah Louvre patented and manufactured in 1920 by Thermotank limited.

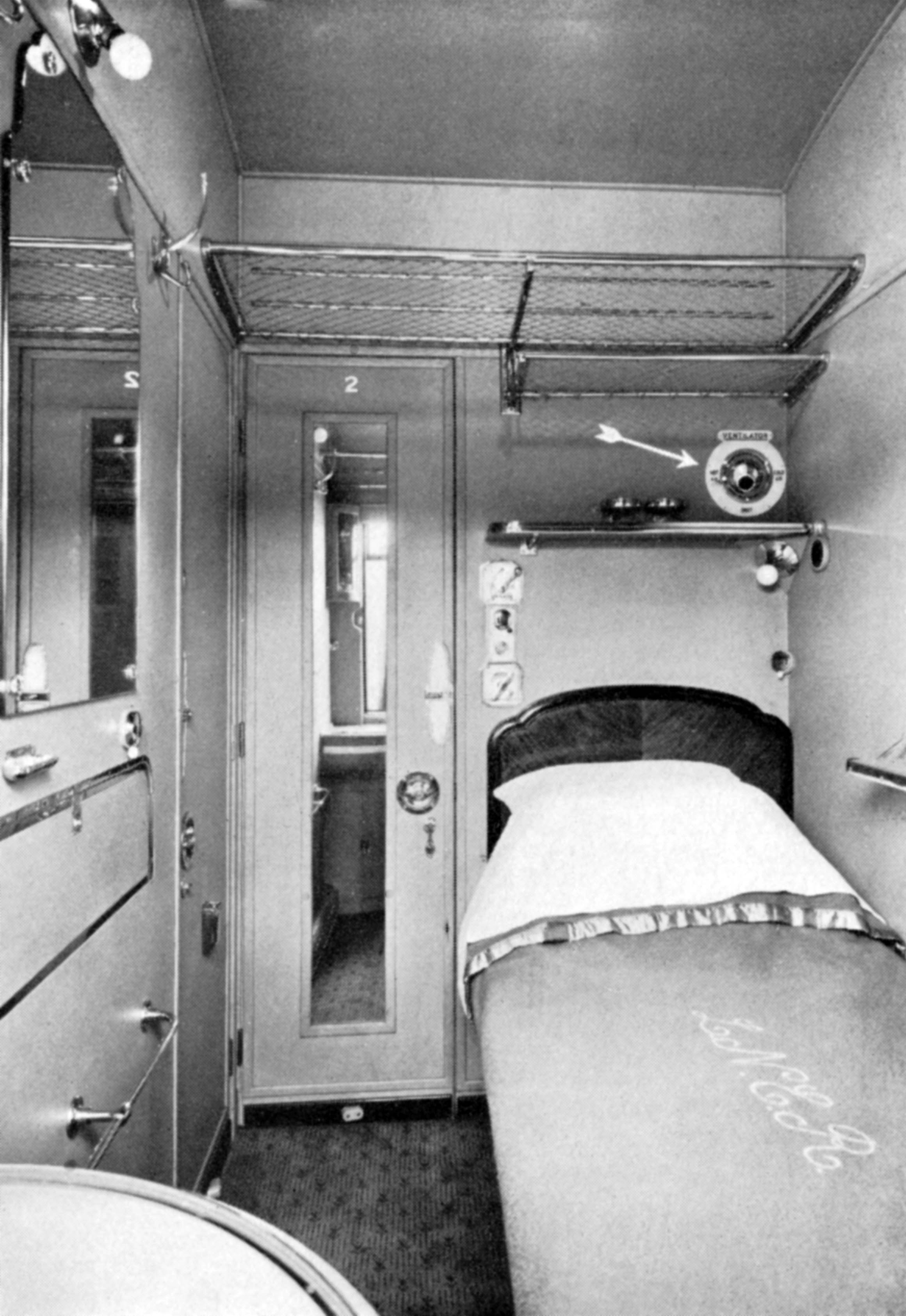
The Thermotank system showing a Punkah Louvre, arrowed, fitted on an LNER train sleeping car in the 1930s.

1939-45. During World War Two about one million Thermotank Punkah Louvres of various types were supplied, of which fifty thousand were for aircraft. Fifty thousand Admiralty type fans were supplied for naval vessels and approximately 1500 heating, ventilating and air conditioning systems were installed in merchant vessels and 600 in warships. About 450 miles of trunking was manufactured as well as ventilating fans for coal mines, underground railways and refrigerated food stores. Amongst ‘secret’ projects were the Battle Headquarters of the North African Campaign and the Mulberry Project for D Day. By 1945, Thermotank equipment had been fitted in more than 50 million tons of shipping, in large numbers of trains and aircraft, and in many famous public buildings. Offices and works were opened in London, Liverpool and Newcastle.

By 1946, in addition to offices and works in the UK, Thermotank had offices in Montreal and Johannesburg.

In 1950, Iain Maxwell Stewart (1916-1985), son of William Maxwell Stewart, took over as Managing Director of Thermotank Ltd.

== 1959 Merger with J&E Hall & Co Ltd ==
J & E Hall was a long-established company, a subsidiary of P&O, based in Dartford known primarily as manufacturers of refrigeration plant. Thermotank had used Hall's refrigeration plant in their air conditioning systems while Hall used Thermotank’s air conditioning expertise.

At the time of the merger, brokered by Iain M Stewart of Glasgow, Hall employed 4,500 people and Thermotank 1,500. A holding company, Hall-Thermotank Ltd., was formed with (Sir) Iain M Stewart as Chairman. At the time of the merger, Thermotank had a number of subsidiaries, Lumenated Ceilings Ltd, Sound Control Ltd, Acoustical Investigation and Research Organisation Ltd (AIRO), Thermotank Plastics Ltd. Additionally Thermotank had offshoots in Australia, Canada, Iraq, Norway, South Africa, USA and West Germany.

Contingent upon the merger of Hall with Thermotank was the acquisition of Vent-Axia Ltd, manufacturers of fans and in particular the window fan.

In 1962, Hall Thermotank acquired the Searle Manufacturing Co Ltd., makers of heat transfer products used in air conditioning and refrigeration.

== Group Reorganisation 1968-70 ==
Following reorganisation, J&E Hall was renamed Hall Thermotank International Ltd (HTI) which in turn was split into Contracting (HTI Engineering and HTI Services) and Production (J&E Hall Products, Thermotank Products and Searle Products).

Contracting was based at Glasgow and Dartford under the title Hall-Thermotank International. Glasgow concentrated on consultancy, design, supply installation and commissioning of marine air conditioning, heating and ventilating equipment. Dartford provided a refrigeration contracting service from cargo room plant to refrigeration machinery for air conditioning systems.

In 1976, The Hall Thermotank Groups was purchased by APV Holdings and renamed APV Hall. In 1994, APV Hall sold to Malaysian group OYL and the name J&E Hall was reinstated. In 2006, Daikin Industries Ltd acquired the Group.
