= The Bowler and the Bunnet =

1967 television film directed by Sean Connery

- Genre: Political documentary
- Written by: Clifford Hanley
- Directed by: Sean Connery
- Presented by: Sean Connery
- Country of origin: Scotland

Production
- Running time: 60 minutes (including adverts)
- Production companies: Scottish Television (STV Studios)

Original release
- Network: STV
- Release: 18 July 1967 – 13 October 2006

The Bowler and the Bunnet is a Scottish television documentary programme that aired on STV, directed and presented by Sean Connery. It is the only film ever directed by Connery.

The documentary, filmed in black and white, was a critical examination of the Fairfield Experiment, whereby the industrialist Sir Iain Maxwell Stewart and the trades union introduced new working practices at the shipyard of Fairfield Shipbuilding and Engineering Company in Glasgow. It was released onto DVD by the British Film Institute as part of their Tales from the Shipyard boxed-set in February 2011.

The title comes from the tradition where bowler hats were worn by managers within the shipyards while bonnets (cloth caps) were worn by the workers.
