= Cliff Hanley =

Scottish writer and journalist (1922–1999)

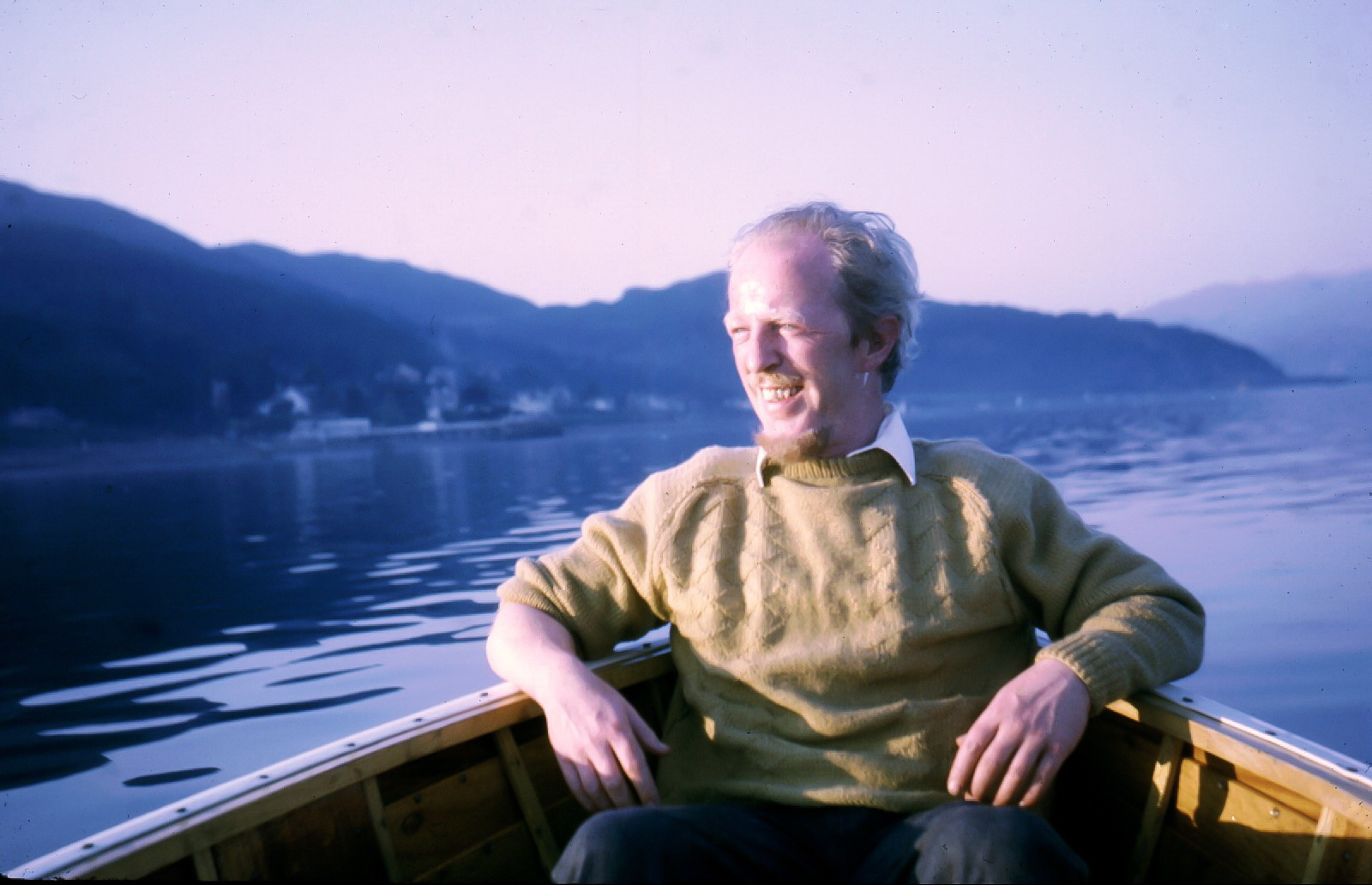

Clifford Leonard Clark "Cliff" Hanley (28 October 1922 – 9 August 1999) was a journalist, novelist, playwright and broadcaster from Glasgow in Scotland. Originally from Shettleston in the city's East End, he was educated at Eastbank Academy.

During the late 1930s, he was active in the Independent Labour Party. During the Second World War he was a conscientious objector.

He also wrote a number of books, including Dancing in the Streets, an account of his early life in Glasgow (in its contemporaneous serialisation in The Evening Times, retitled My Gay Glasgow), The Taste of Too Much, a coming-of-age novel about a secondary schoolboy, and The Scots.

During the 1960s and 1970s, he published thrillers under the pen-name Henry Calvin. They were more successful in the US and Canada than in the UK. A collection of his humorous verse in Scots, using the pseudonym 'Ebenezer McIlwham', was published by Gordon Wright Publishing of Edinburgh. He also wrote the words of what some still feel is Scotland's unofficial national anthem, Scotland the Brave, and both wrote and recorded The Glasgow Underground Song - a humorous anecdote on the pre-modernisation era Glasgow Subway. A recording of this was made famous by Francie and Josie.

He wrote a number of film and TV scripts, including Between the Lines, an episode of which was described by Mary Whitehouse as the "filthiest programme" her family had seen on TV "for a very long time" at the first public meeting of the 'Clean-Up TV' campaign in May 1964. Hanley's other scripts include Seawards the Great Ships, The Bowler and the Bunnet, and The New Road. His son is artist Cliff Hanley (born 1948).
