= G'olé! =

1983 film by Tom Clegg

- Directed by: Tom Clegg
- Music by: Rick Wakeman
- Release date: 21 March 1983 (United Kingdom)
- Running time: 101 minutes
- Country: United Kingdom
- Language: English

G'olé! is the official documentary film of the 1982 FIFA World Cup held in Spain.

The film is narrated by Sean Connery and the score was written by Rick Wakeman. It tells the story of the 1982 FIFA World Cup which was won by Italy who beat West Germany in the final. It also highlights New Zealand – who played the most games in order to qualify – and Cameroon, a rising African force.

== Distribution ==
- United Kingdom: 21 March 1983 (preview)
- Italy: 13 April 1983 (TV premiere)
- Finland: 11 November 1984 (TV premiere)

== Soundtrack ==
G'olé!

Soundtrack album by Rick Wakeman
- Released: 22 April 1983
- Genre: Progressive rock
- Length: 37:26
- Label: Music Fusion
- Producer: Rick Wakeman

Rick Wakeman chronology
Cost of Living (1983)	G'olé! (1983)	Silent Nights (1985)

Singles from G'olé!
- 1. "Latin Reel" Released: April 1983

Professional ratings
Review scores
Source	Rating
Allmusic	2/5 stars

=== Track listing ===
1. "International Flag" – 2:15
2. "The Dove (opening ceremony)" – 2:40
3. "Wayward Spirit" – 3:22
4. "Latin Reel (Theme From G'olé)" – 2:47
5. "Red Island" – 5:06
6. "Spanish Holiday" – 2:46
7. "No Possible" – 2:57
8. "Shadows" – 3:41
9. "Black Pearls" – 2:54
10. "Frustration" – 3:12
11. "Spanish Montage" – 2:48
12. "G'olé" – 2:58
