= Lisztomania (album) =

1975 soundtrack album by Rick Wakeman

Soundtrack album by Rick Wakeman
- Released: October 1975
- Recorded: 1975
- Studio: Island Mobile and RAK Mobile
- Genre: Progressive rock
- Length: 32:12
- Label: A&M
- Producer: Rick Wakeman

Rick Wakeman chronology
The Myths and Legends of King Arthur and the Knights of the Round Table (1975)	Lisztomania (1975)	No Earthly Connection (1976)

Singles from Lisztomania
- 1. "Love's Dream" Released: January 1976

Lisztomania is the first soundtrack album by the English keyboardist Rick Wakeman. It was released in October 1975 by A&M Records as the soundtrack for the Ken Russell's musical biographical film Lisztomania about the Hungarian composer Franz Liszt. Some tracks feature the Who's Roger Daltrey singing lead vocals.

The album was later upgraded as The Real Lisztomania by Wakeman because he was dissatisfied with the original release.

== Background ==
By 1975, Wakeman had established himself as the former Yes keyboardist and a successful solo artist with three rock concept albums: The Six Wives of Henry VIII (1973), Journey to the Centre of the Earth (1974), and The Myths and Legends of King Arthur and the Knights of the Round Table (1975). After Wakeman finished touring Journey to the Centre of the Earth in March 1975, he was asked to compose the score for Lisztomania, a contemporary biographical film of the Hungarian composer Franz Liszt directed by Ken Russell.

Wakeman recorded the album through 1975 during gaps between recording and live performances, and worked closely with Russell on the score. Once Russell knew exactly what music was going to be used, he gave Wakeman artistic freedom to record what he wanted. Initially Wakeman considered the record "a bonus soundtrack", but after writing and recording the music for it, he was "very happy" with the results and regarded it as his "next official album". An initial cut and master was produced by Wakeman which his label, A&M Records, declared unsatisfactory. This complicated matters further between Wakeman and A&M, as the two parties had disagreed over aspects of his earlier solo albums. In August 1975, after the album had been recorded, Wakeman said he was pleased with the music, but had no control over what tracks were to be included on the album. The situation culminated in A&M producing a cut featuring less of the music Wakeman had written and recorded without his approval which, upon hearing what the label had selected for release, annoyed him greatly.

== Release and critical reception ==
Professional ratings
Review scores
Source	Rating
AllMusic	2/5 stars

AllMusic said, "The soundtrack to Ken Russell's movie provided Wakeman with a canvas upon which to work his magic (or do his damage—it depends upon one's attitude) upon the music of Franz Liszt and, to a lesser degree, Richard Wagner. Actually, much of what is here is more substantial than the material on Journey or Myths and Legends, which can be attributed largely to the composers' contributions." Wakeman has written on his website that "this album stinks".

Excerpts from the album were performed live on Wakeman's tour of North America and Brazil in late 1975.

== Track listing ==
Side one
No.	Title	Writer(s)	Lyrics	Length
1.	"Rienzi / Chopsticks Fantasia"	Richard Wagner, Franz Liszt		4:20
2.	"Love's Dream"	Liszt	Roger Daltrey	4:25
3.	"Dante Period"	Liszt		2:05
4.	"Orpheus Song"	Liszt	Jonathan Benson, Daltrey	3:10
5.	"Hell"	Liszt	John Forsythe (translation)	1:59

Side two
No.	Title	Writer(s)	Lyrics	Length
1.	"Hibernation"	Rick Wakeman		1:11
2.	"Excelsior Song"	Liszt	Wakeman, Ken Russell	2:32
3.	"Master Race"	Wagner		0:45
4.	"Rape, Pillage and Clap"	Wagner		3:09
5.	"Funerailles"	Liszt	Benson	3:48
6.	"Free Song (Hungarian Rhapsody)"	Liszt		1:57
7.	"Peace at Last"	Liszt	Benson, Daltrey	2:59

== Personnel ==
Musicians

- Rick Wakeman – keyboards
- David Wilde – piano (Liszt music)
- Roger Daltrey – vocals on "Love's Dream", "Orpheus Song", "Funerailles", "Peace at Last"
- Linda Lewis – vocals on "Hell"
- Paul Nicholas – vocals on "Excelsior Song"
- National Philharmonic Orchestra
- George Michie
- John Forsythe
- The English Rock Ensemble

Production

- Rick Wakeman – production, arrangements
- Bill Curbishley – executive production
- Brian Lane – executive production
- Roland Young – art direction
- Junie Osaki – design
- Mixed at Island Studios and Olympic Studios, London

== Charts ==
Chart (1975)	Peak position
Australian Albums (Kent Music Report)	85
US Billboard 200	145
