= Warhorse (British band) =

British rock band formed Nick Simper

- Origin: England
- Genres: Hard rock, progressive rock, heavy metal
- Years active: 1970–1974, 1985, 2005
- Label: Vertigo
- Past members: Ashley Holt; Nick Simper; Mac Poole; Ged Peck; Rick Wakeman; Frank Wilson; Pete Parks; Barney James

Warhorse was a British rock band formed by Deep Purple's first bassist Nick Simper.

== History ==
After being sacked by Deep Purple in 1969, Simper joined Marsha Hunt's backing band. Not long after, Simper replaced her backing band with Ged Peck on guitar and Mac Poole on drums. When Hunt became pregnant, the band stopped touring, and Simper and Peck re-organized the group as Warhorse. Ashley Holt became the band's singer, and they recruited keyboardist Rick Wakeman. When their first demo was recorded in April 1970, Wakeman left to join the Strawbs and was replaced by Frank Wilson.

Warhorse signed to Vertigo, and released their first album, Warhorse in November 1970. Warhorse was managed by Ron Hire, originally part of HEC Enterprises, the original investors in Deep Purple.

The band began to tour, but made little progress, and the album failed to chart. A single, "St. Louis", was released, which failed to chart (although it did reach a "bubbling under" chart in the Netherlands in 1971). By 1971, after arguments about style, Peck left and moved to classical guitar playing. He was replaced by Pete Parks.

In June 1972, their next album, Red Sea, was released, but soon after Warhorse was dropped from the label. Around the same time, Poole decided to leave Warhorse for Gong. The band carried on, and replaced Poole with Barney James. Rick Wakeman remembered Ashley Holt and Barney James and recruited both when he formed his band The English Rock Ensemble for his solo albums, Journey to the Centre of the Earth and The Myths and Legends of King Arthur and the Knights of the Round Table. Warhorse's last concert in 1974 was at Polhill College, Bedford.

Warhorse musicians (Holt, Parks, Simper, Wilson, and Poole) have since played together on several occasions, including 1985 and 2005, latterly for drummer Poole's 60th birthday. Poole died on 21 May 2015.

== Personnel ==
=== Members ===
- Ashley Holt - lead vocals (1970-1974, 1985, 2005)
- Nick Simper - bass guitar (1970-1974, 1985, 2005)
- Mac Poole - drums (1970-1972, 1985, 2005; died 2015)
- Ged Peck - guitar (1970-1971; died 2015)
- Rick Wakeman - keyboards (1970)
- Frank Wilson - keyboards (1970-1974, 1985, 2005)
- Pete Parks - guitar (1971-1974, 1985, 2005)
- Barney James - drums (1972-1974; died 2016)

=== Line-ups ===
| 1970 | 1970-1971 | 1971-1972 (Reunions in 1985 and 2005) | 1972-1974 |
|---|---|---|---|
| Ashley Holt - vocals; Ged Peck - guitar; Mac Poole - drums; Nick Simper - bass guitar; Rick Wakeman - keyboards | Ashley Holt - vocals; Ged Peck - guitar; Mac Poole - drums; Nick Simper - bass guitar; Frank Wilson - keyboards | Ashley Holt - vocals; Mac Poole - drums; Nick Simper - bass guitar; Frank Wilson - keyboards; Pete Parks - guitar | Ashley Holt - vocals; Nick Simper - bass guitar; Frank Wilson - keyboards; Pete Parks - guitar; Barney James - drums |

== Discography ==
=== Albums ===
- Warhorse (1970)
- Red Sea (1972)

=== Compilation albums ===
- Best of Warhorse (1986)
- Outbreak of Hostilities (1991)
