= Rick Wakeman's Criminal Record =

Studio album by Rick Wakeman
- Released: November 1977
- Recorded: April–June 1977
- Studios: Mountain (Montreux, Switzerland)
- Genres: Progressive rock; instrumental rock
- Length: 39:04
- Label: A&M
- Producer: Rick Wakeman

Rick Wakeman chronology
White Rock (1977)	Rick Wakeman's Criminal Record (1977)	Rhapsodies (1979)

Singles from Criminal Record
- 1. "Birdman of Alcatraz" Released: 20 April 1979

Rick Wakeman's Criminal Record is the fifth studio album by the English keyboardist Rick Wakeman, released in November 1977 on A&M Records. After touring his previous album No Earthly Connection in August 1976, Wakeman rejoined the progressive rock band Yes as they recorded Going for the One (1977) in Switzerland. When recording finished, he started work on a new solo record which took form as a keyboard-oriented instrumental album similar to that of his earlier album, The Six Wives of Henry VIII (1973), and loosely based on criminality. Several guest musicians play on the record, including Chris Squire and Alan White of Yes, percussionist Frank Ricotti, and comedian Bill Oddie on vocals.

The album received some mixed reviews upon release, and reached No. 25 in the UK. In 2006, the album was remastered as a limited edition with 5,000 copies produced.

== Background ==
In August 1976, Wakeman finished touring his previous studio album, No Earthly Connection. The album and tour was a musical departure for Wakeman, as he had scored worldwide success with three concept albums and toured with symphony orchestras and choirs, and by the end of 1975, had become costly endeavours. The 1976 tour had barely broke even, and Wakeman fell into financial trouble which was partly down to tax payments he could no longer afford. To combat this, he became a tax exile, recording No Earthly Connection in France, and entered tentative rehearsals for a new rock trio with drummer Bill Bruford and vocalist and bassist John Wetton. After they split, Wakeman rejoined the progressive rock band Yes as they were recording Going for the One (1977) at Montreux, Switzerland. During his first Christmas in Montreux, Wakeman came up with the album during a meal, where he was asked if he had a criminal record. "I said, 'No, but I think I soon will have.'"

Wakeman did not start work on the album until April 1977, when recording for Going for the One was complete as making a band and a solo album simultaneously was not feasible. With members of Yes and the production crew still in Montreux, Yes bassist Chris Squire asked Wakeman about the project during a visit in the White Horse pub in Montreux, and learned that the keyboardist intended to produce an album with its concept based on criminality, and revealed its title. At the time, Wakeman wished for the album to feature a band playing, but wanted to do "something completely different this time around" and pointed out that typically, the keyboard tracks got put down last after the group had played their parts, leaving the keyboards fighting for space around the pre-recorded music. Wakeman, however, wished for Criminal Record to be similar to his first, The Six Wives of Henry VIII (1973), and be an album where the keyboards take precedence. He also described Criminal Record as "a 1977 version of Henry", of which its music was a follow-up to what he had put on his second soundtrack album, White Rock (1977).

== Recording ==
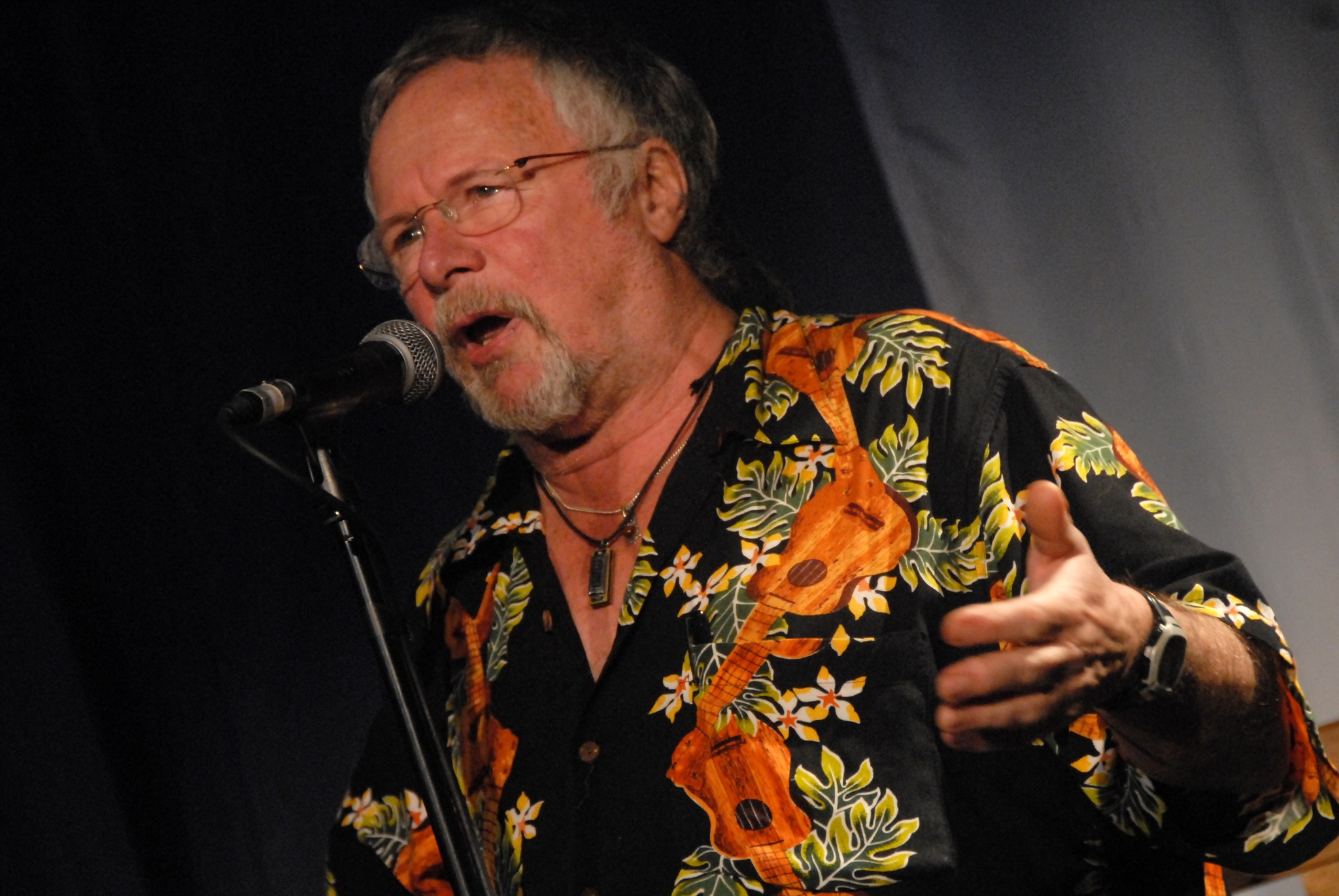
Bill Oddie provides vocals on "The Breathalyser"

The album was recorded at Mountain Studios from April to June 1977 with John Timperley as engineer and mixer and Dave Richards as assistant engineer. Wakeman put his keyboard parts down first, followed by bass guitar and drums. Squire and Yes drummer Alan White agreed to play the respective parts, and are featured on side one of the album. However, instead of giving Squire and White preconceived music or ideas on what to play, Wakeman told the pair to record what they wanted on top of the keyboards, thereby giving them complete control of what they played. He added: "I deliberately didn't go anywhere near the studio. [...] The first time I heard it was after about ten days, I can't even remember where I went. I didn't even stay in Switzerland!"

After Richards informed Wakeman of the completion of the bass and drum parts, Wakeman returned to the studio and enjoyed listening back to the songs transformed as it felt like he was listening to them for the first time. He remembered White called him "some gynaecological term" as the music continually varied in pace and he had refused to use a click track due to his distaste of them. Wakeman praised Squire in particular as he contributed some interesting parts that he would not have thought to write. Wakeman was so pleased with Squire and White's performance that he wished to re-record and re-arrange some of his keyboard parts, but there were insufficient tracks left to use and no more budget. The final parts were put down by percussionist Frank Ricotti, who added timpani and tuned percussion, and comedian Bill Oddie of The Goodies fame, who provided a humorous, tongue-in-cheek lyric for "The Breathalyser". Both were recorded in the course of a day.

== Music ==
"Statue of Justice" is named after the bronze statue of Lady Justice atop of the dome above the Old Bailey courts in London. "Chamber of Horrors" is named after the exhibition at Madame Tussauds wax museum in London that contains waxworks of notorious murderers and other infamous figures. The scream at the end of the track was by a woman that Wakeman had met in a local pub in Montreux. He asked every girl in the pub to scream, and chose the best sounding one to record it in the studio. Wakeman recalled: "She dutifully screamed once more and then went back to the pub."

"Birdman of Alcatraz" was the nickname of convicted American murderer Robert Stroud, who during his time at Leavenworth Penitentiary, reared and sold birds and became a respected ornithologist. The piano was recorded at a church in Les Planches, a village outside Montreux. The middle features sounds of birds chirping. "The Breathalyser" is about someone who fails a breathalyser and is taken to a police station, where he refuses a blood test and must submit to a urinalysis. The song purposely quotes Joseph Winner's "The Little Brown Jug", a well known drinking song, during the first bars.

"Judas Iscariot" is named after the biblical figure who was a disciple and one of the original Twelve Apostles of Jesus, whose name is often used synonymously with betrayal or treason. The 12-minute piece features the 44-piece Ars Laeta of Lausanne choir who were recorded at the Les Planches church, and a Mander pipe organ at St. Martin's church in Vevey. Both are featured on Yes's "Awaken" on Going for the One. The closing section of the track contains the melody of the Christian hymn "There is a green hill far away". Wakeman claimed Andrew Lloyd Webber took a section of the piece for The Phantom of the Opera without credit.

== Release ==
Professional ratings
Review scores
Source	Rating
AllMusic	3/5 stars
Variety	(favourable)

In 2006, Hip-O Select Records issued 5,000 individually numbered CDs which marked the first time the album was released on CD outside Japan. In 2014, it was released on CD once more by Real Gone Music.

Wakeman looked back on Criminal Record as one that did not quite come out as he wanted, except for "Judas Iscariot". Despite calling it a "nearly" album and questioning whether it should have been recorded with The Six Wives of Henry VIII in mind, Wakeman said there were "some excellent all round performances". In 2003, Wakeman recalled A&M Records "couldn't understand it" and claimed the label continued to hold some dissatisfaction towards it.

In 1979, "Birdman of Alcatraz" was used as the theme music to the BBC television drama series My Son, My Son. It was subsequently released as a single with "Flacons de Neige" from Rhapsodies (1979) on the B-side.

== Track listing ==
All tracks are written by Rick Wakeman.

Side one
No.	Title	Length
1.	"Statue of Justice"	6:20
2.	"Crime of Passion"	5:46
3.	"Chamber of Horrors"	6:40

Side two
No.	Title	Length
1.	"Birdman of Alcatraz"	4:12
2.	"The Breathalyser"	3:51
3.	"Judas Iscariot"	12:15

== Personnel ==
Credits are adapted from the album's sleeve notes.

Music

- Rick Wakeman – Steinway 9' grand piano, Minimoog synthesiser, Polymoog synthesiser, Hammond C3 organ, Birotron, Mander pipe organ at St. Martin's church in Vevey, RMI computer keyboard, harpsichord, Fender Rhodes 88 electric piano, Hohner clavinet, Baldwin electric harpsichord
- Chris Squire – bass guitar on "Statue of Justice", "Crime of Passion", and "Chamber of Horrors"
- Alan White – drums on "Statue of Justice", "Crime of Passion", and "Chamber of Horrors"
- Frank Ricotti – percussion on "Statue of Justice", "Crime of Passion", "Chamber of Horrors", and "Judas Iscariot"
- Bill Oddie – vocals on "The Breathalyser"
- Ars Laeta Choir of Lausanne – choir on "Judas Iscariot"
  - Alto vocals – Anne Claude, Christiane Durel, Christine Frehholz, Elisabeth Pahud, Francoise Wannaz, Janine Isaaz, Janine Pradervand, Josianne Henn, Liliane De Berville, Marlyse Berney, Mary Lise Perey, Nicole Metraus, Pierre Humbert
  - Bass vocals – Claude Alain Morasini, George Caille, Jean-Michel Favez, Peirre Tharin, Piere Alain Favez, Roland Demiville, Samuel Chetrit, Yves Lamberey
  - Soprano vocals – Anne Catherine Noinat, Annette Fonjallaz, Christine Riesen, Claire-Lisa Valet, Claudine Corbaz, Claudine Mange, Daniele Meystre, Eliane Henchoz, Francoise Cardinaux, Francoise Cottet, Lise Dutray, Marlyse Paschoud, Sylviane Savez
  - Tenor vocals – Andre Borboen, Bernard Dutruy, Charles Moinat, Claude Alain Von Buren, Daniel Borgeaud, Francoise Emery, Jean Maurice Juvet, Raphael Bugnon, Rene Monachon
- Robert Mernoud – choir conductor on "Judas Iscariot"

Production

- Rick Wakeman – production
- John Timperley – engineer, mixing
- Dave Richards – assistant engineer on "Statue of Justice", "Crime of Passion", and "Chamber of Horrors", mixing
- Jim McCrary – photography
- Chuck Beeson – visual concept, design
- Roland Young – art direction
- Sean Davies – disc cutting

== Charts ==
Chart (1977–1978)	Peak position
Australian Albums (Kent Music Report)	76
Norwegian Albums (VG-lista)	19
UK Albums (Official Charts)	25
US Billboard 200	128
