= Christmas Portraits =

Studio album by Rick Wakeman
- Released: 29 November 2019
- Recorded: August 2019
- Studio: The Old Granary Studio, Beccles, Suffolk
- Genre: Classical piano
- Length: 51:14
- Label: Sony Classical
- Producer: Rick Wakeman; Erik Jordan

Rick Wakeman chronology
Piano Odyssey (2018)	Christmas Portraits (2019)	The Red Planet (2020)

Christmas Portraits is a studio album by English keyboardist Rick Wakeman. It was released on 29 November 2019 by Sony Classical Records as the third of a series of piano-oriented albums, following Piano Portraits (2017) and Piano Odyssey (2018).

== Background ==
Following the release of his piano album Piano Portraits in 2017, management at Sony Classical Records suggested to Wakeman that he record a follow-up with piano variations of Christmas songs. Wakeman thought it could work at first, but wanted to spend some time thinking about whether such a concept would work. He ultimately agreed to do it, but felt its release needed a gap after Piano Portraits and that a string section was needed to complement the arrangements. Instead, he recorded and released Piano Odyssey in 2018.

In March 2019, Wakeman announced upcoming meetings about the possibility of recording a new piano album, with its theme yet to be determined. In the following months Sony gave the green-light for a Christmas themed piano album featuring variations of Christmas songs and carols. Wakeman started work on Christmas Portraits by listing 42 Christmas pieces that he was interested to record for the album. After a period of playing the pieces on the piano, he realised that some did not work as a piano arrangement and the list was reduced to 23 potential tracks. From here, Wakeman entered the studio with his longtime engineer Erik Jordan. However, he found that some of the songs were too short in length as standalone tracks. To solve this issue, pieces were combined to form a single track.

Wakeman recorded the album at The Old Granary Studio near Beccles in Suffolk because it houses one of his favourite instruments, a Steinway Model D grand piano. Wakeman dedicated August 2019 to record Christmas Portraits. Wakeman arrived at the studio on the first day of recording to find it decorated with "a moth-eaten Christmas tree" with presents and tinsel. The album was recorded with Wakeman's longtime engineer Erik Jordan, who is also credited as a co-producer. In September 2019, Wakeman revealed that the album was finished and it had been delivered to Sony.

== Release ==
The album was released on 29 November 2019. Wakeman supported it with The Grumpy Old Christmas Show piano tour across England in December, featuring live performances tracks from Christmas Portraits.

== Track listing ==
No.	Title	Writer(s)	Length
1.	"The First Noel"
2.	"In the Bleak Midwinter"	Gustav Holst
3.	"Deck the Halls With Boughs of Holly"/"Away in a Manger"
4.	"The Holly and the Ivy"/"Mary's Boy Child"
5.	"Silent Night"
6.	"God Rest Ye Merry Gentlemen"/"Angels from the Realms of Glory"
7.	"O Come All Ye Faithful"/"Hark the Herald Angels Sing"/"See Amid the Winter Snow"
8.	"O Little Town of Bethlehem"
9.	"I Saw Three Ships"/"When a Child is Born"
10.	"O Holy Night"
11.	"The Coventry Carol"/"O Come, O Come, Emmanuel"
12.	"A Winter's Tale"	Mike Batt and Tim Rice
13.	"We Three Kings"
14.	"Sussex Carol"/"It Came Upon a Midnight Clear"

Japanese bonus track
No.	Title	Length
15.	"Joy to the World"

== Personnel ==
- Rick Wakeman – Steinway Model D grand piano, producer
- Erik Jordan – engineer, co-producer

== Charts ==
Chart (2019)	Peak position
Scottish Albums (OCC)	78
UK Albums (OCC)	82
