= The Red Planet =

Studio album by Rick Wakeman
- Released: 19 June 2020
- Recorded: 2019–2020
- Studio: The Sunflower Studio; PWL Studios; Shabby Road Studio; The Windmill Studios
- Genre: Progressive rock; instrumental rock
- Length: 55:21
- Label: R&D Media; Madfish Music
- Producer: Rick Wakeman; Erik Jordan

Rick Wakeman chronology
Christmas Portraits (2019)	The Red Planet (2020)	The Gallery of the Imagination (2023)

The Red Planet is a studio album by English keyboardist Rick Wakeman, released on 19 June 2020 and featuring an alternative line-up of his backing band, The English Rock Ensemble. It was originally scheduled for release on 3 April 2020 through R&D Media, but was delayed until June 2020. It received a digital release online on 19 June, with a physical release following on 27 June.

== Background ==
The album was announced in the January 2020 edition of Wakeman's monthly blog that is posted on his website, the Rick Wakeman Communication Centre. He revealed that it will take form as an instrumental progressive rock album that is "keyboard heavy" in a similar style to his 1973 debut, The Six Wives of Henry VIII. Wakeman posted a series of updates on his Twitter page in the week after the announcement, including the notice that recording started on 13 January in what turned out to be productive and inspirational sessions in the studio. By 11 February, Wakeman had posted an update that the basic tracks had been completed. The album was announced which revealed its title, artwork, and release date at the same time. It was released through R&D Media, a new business venture founded by Rob Ayling and rock music journalist and producer Doug Harr.

The Red Planet is Wakeman's first progressive rock album with his English Rock Ensemble since Out There (2003), another rock album of his with connections to space, the others being No Earthly Connection (1976) and 2000 A.D. Into the Future (1993). Wakeman said the album is different to his previous ones with a band, not only that it is instrumental but the diverse styles of music on it. He pointed out that the album is also dedicated to one planet, Mars. It features two longtime members of his backing band, The English Rock Ensemble: bassist Lee Pomeroy and guitarist Dave Colquhoun, with drummer Ash Soan. It was produced by himself and his longtime producer and technician, Erik Jordan, who also mixed the album. In early March 2020, Wakeman reported that recording had been completed and that Jordan was completing the mixes.

Prior to release, "Tharsus Tholus", the album's second track, was named "Tharsus Folus".

== Release ==
The Red Planet was scheduled for release on 3 April 2020, and a playback event was to take place at the National Space Centre in Leicester on the following day, limited to 150 people. However, due to the worldwide coronavirus pandemic, the playback was cancelled and the album's release was delayed until June 2020. It was released online on 19 June, with a physical release to follow. The first 1,000 vinyl copies will be pressed on 180-gram red double vinyl and signed and numbered with pop-up artwork. The first 2,000 CDs will be autographed and numbered with an alternate pop-up cover.

== Track listing ==
All tracks written by Wakeman.

The Red Planet track listing
No.	Title	Length
1.	"Ascraeus Mons"	5:53
2.	"Tharsis Tholus"	6:17
3.	"Arsia Mons"	6:10
4.	"Olympus Mons"	5:20
5.	"The North Plain"	6:53
6.	"Pavonis Mons"	7:14
7.	"South Pole"	7:35
8.	"Valles Marineris"	10:02
Total length:		55:21

== Personnel ==
Musicians

- Rick Wakeman – keyboards
- Dave Colquhoun – guitars
- Lee Pomeroy – bass
- Ash Soan – drums

Production

- Rick Wakeman – production
- Erik Jordan – production, mixing
- Toby Wood – mixing
- Simon Heyworth – mastering and surround sound mixing
- Bill Sellar – mastering
- Martin Robert Cook – cover

== Charts ==
Chart (2020)	Peak position
Scottish Albums (OCC)	16
UK Albums (OCC)	34
UK Independent Albums (OCC)	1
UK Progressive Albums (OCC)	3
UK Rock & Metal Albums (OCC)	2
