= Ged Peck =

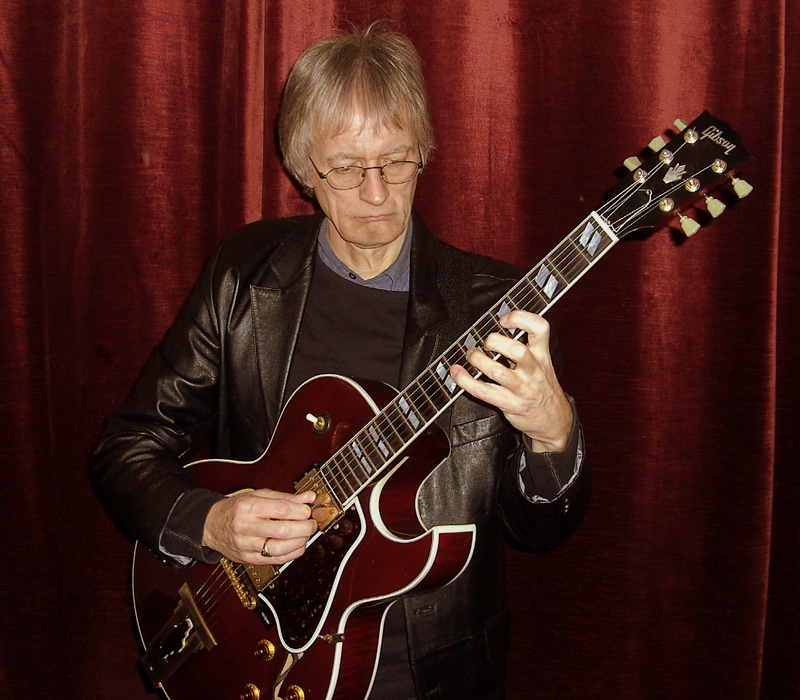
- Ged Peck in 2009

Background information
- Born: 19 October 1947; West Hendon, London, England
- Died: 10 January 2015 (aged 67)
- Genres: Rock (up to 1971); Classical; Jazz
- Occupation(s): Musician: Semi-professional 1961 to 1964; Professional 1964 to 1986 Lecturer: University/college 1986 onwards, BA (Hons), Cert Ed, LRAM
- Instrument(s): Gibson ES345-TDC; Gibson L-4 CES; Gibson Howard Roberts; Fusion III; Ibanez JSM 100; Fender Stratocaster; Fender Telecaster; Hofner HCT-J17; Epiphone ES-175; Washburn EA-18; Ibanez Artcore AF75TDG; Hagström HJ800; José Ramírez 1973 classical Paul Fischer 1976 classical Dante Longaretti classical 1981
- Labels: Mercury Records; Pye; Vertigo Records; EMI; Angel Air Records

Ged Peck (19 October 1947 – 10 January 2015) was an English musician who played in several bands - mainly backing work with Billy Fury, Vince Eager, Tommy Quickly when he was managed by Brian Epstein, Americans Bob & Earl who had a hit single with Harlem Shuffle, The Flower Pot Men, the Pirates, singers Marsha Hunt, Billie Davis, Screaming Lord Sutch and David Garrick, whilst doing numerous studio sessions.

He recorded for the BBC with Billy Fury, Marsha Hunt, Billie Davis and James Royal, whilst playing on an early recording by Marc Bolan which was produced by Mike Hurst of The Springfields.

== Life and career ==
He began playing semi-professional when still at school and was soon working the big London hotels with the Rudi Rome Orchestra. He also played at the famous 2i's Coffee Bar in Old Compton Street and was offered a residency which he turned down due to his reluctance to sign any contracts with owner Tom Littlewood. After a later spell in northern England playing with a Bury-based group, he returned to London and joined a "mod" band called the Favourite Sons who recorded some tracks in 1965 with Mike Hurst and also played on the album they made. It was this band that occasionally backed Vince Eager and Tommy Quickly.

In 1966, he joined the Freddie Mack Sound which consisted of anything between ten and eighteen personnel with a full scale horn section led by baritone sax player Roger Warwick and toured Britain, Ireland and France incessantly. It was here that he met drummer B. J. Wilson and bassist Alan Cartwright, both of whom were later to join Procol Harum. The band also included Liverpudlian singer Derry Wilkie who had previously topped the bill over The Beatles in Germany with his band the Pressmen. The Freddie Mack Sound was so popular on the road that people would be turned away at some gigs. This was certainly the case when the band appeared at Liverpool's Cavern Club. Freddie Mack was a former American light-heavyweight boxer of some repute. The connection helped to get them a regular residency at English boxer Billy Walker's Uppercut Club in Forest Gate, east London. They played with all the leading acts of the time such was The Who, Pink Floyd, The Small Faces and Jimi Hendrix.

Following a myriad of aforementioned backing work, Peck was then invited by Alan Cartwright to join Every Which Way, a short-lived band prior to Cartwright and B. J. Wilson joining Procol Harum. He had a knack for turning down such promising offers having previously refused to join the chart-topping Foundations. He was also known for walking out of engagements he did not like, and was either lauded or criticised by contemporaries for his very fast playing style.

During his time backing The Flower Pot Men around Europe, who also played at Wembley's Empire Pool with Cliff Richard and The Shadows, two members of the backing band – bassist Nick Simper and organist Jon Lord – were approached by guitarist Ritchie Blackmore to form what later became Deep Purple. Peck and Blackmore had previously met in Hamburg through their drummer Carlo Little, although there was no animosity about the band's break up. They continued to exchange guitars and amplifiers for subsequent recording sessions. Simper was then temporarily replaced by former Georgie Fame bassist Tex Makins who toured Switzerland with Peck and Little backing singer David Garrick. Before this, Peck, Lord, Simper and Little had taken part in a 'package tour' with the U.S. band Vanilla Fudge, and Steve Winwood. Incessant touring around Europe taking in Germany many times, Denmark, the Netherlands, and Belgium continued to take their toll.

In 1968, Peck worked with Billy Fury, whilst trying to form a trio called Storm with former Screaming Lord Sutch bass player Tony Dangerfield and drummer Pete Phillipps. They recorded a solo album although the tapes were subsequently lost. BBC recordings done with Fury from that year have turned up on Fury's official website. On one tour, the group played solo in German, France, and then Germany again (all in the same day), but failed to take off in England. For Peck, session work continued with the likes of pianist Nicky Hopkins who played on many of The Rolling Stones records and James Royal.

Following this, he was asked to join a project band by Nick Simper who had subsequently left Deep Purple. Peck joined forces with keyboard player Rick Wakeman in writing some of the material. However, Wakeman suddenly left and his place was taken by Frank Wilson. Ashley Holt was brought in as a singer whilst Peck and Simper discovered Birmingham drummer Mac Poole. Holt and Wakeman had previously been watched when playing at the Top Rank Ballroom in Reading.

In the meantime, Peck was earning a living from session work and touring with Marsha Hunt, work that culminated in an appearance at the 1969 Isle of Wight Festival in front of 150,000 alongside The Who, Bob Dylan, Joe Cocker and Richie Havens amongst others. Typically, he insisted on using his simple 30 watt Vox amplifier miked-up through Pete Townshend's rather more extensive gear. (This can be seen on a photograph of Peck on stage with Marsha Hunt on an Isle of Wight Festival website). Thereafter, Poole replaced Pete Phillipps on drums and the trio secretly rehearsed with Wilson and Holt for what was to become Warhorse.

Formed between 1969 and 1970, Warhorse released their first LP of the same name which did moderately well, although by this time, Peck was becoming disillusioned with the limitations of rock music and the constant travelling. After some fractious confrontations with the others, he departed. There was one final attempt at a new band with rehearsals at drummer Mitch Mitchell's house following the death of Hendrix, but nothing came of it and he soon left the rock business and became a classical guitarist. In his later years, he took a university degree to become a college lecturer specialising in English and Russian history.

Peck died in January 2015, aged 67.
