= Warhorse (album) =

Studio album by Warhorse
- Released: November 1970
- Recorded: 1970; Trident Studios, London, United Kingdom
- Genres: Hard rock, progressive rock
- Length: 43:40
- Label: Vertigo
- Producers: Warhorse & Ian Kimmet

Warhorse chronology
Warhorse (1970)	Red Sea (1972)

Professional ratings
Review scores
Source	Rating
AllMusic	3/5 stars

Warhorse is the debut album by English hard rock band Warhorse. The album was re-released on vinyl in 1984 under the name Vulture Blood.

== Track listing ==
All songs written by Warhorse, except where noted.

1. "Vulture Blood" – 6:13
2. "No Chance" – 6:22
3. "Burning" – 6:17
4. "St. Louis" – 3:50 (Easybeats cover; written by George Young & Harry Vanda)
5. "Ritual" – 4:54
6. "Solitude" – 8:48
7. "Woman of the Devil" – 7:16

=== Re-issue bonus tracks ===
1. "Ritual" (live)
2. "Miss Jane" (Demo)
3. "Solitude" (live)
4. "Woman of the Devil" (live)
5. "Burning" (live)

== Personnel ==
- Ashley Holt – vocals
- Ged Peck – guitar
- Mac Poole – drums
- Nick Simper – bass
- Frank Wilson – keyboards
