= Piano Odyssey =

Studio album by Rick Wakeman
- Released: 12 October 2018
- Recorded: April–May 2018
- Studio: The Old Granary Studio (Suffolk, England); Angel Recording Studios (Angel, London)
- Genre: Classical piano Orchestral
- Length: 55.00
- Label: Sony Classical
- Producer: Rick Wakeman

Rick Wakeman chronology
Piano Portraits (2017)	Piano Odyssey (2018)	Christmas Portraits (2019)

Piano Odyssey is a studio album by English keyboardist Rick Wakeman, released on 12 October 2018 by Sony Classical Records. After the positive response to his previous album Piano Portraits (2017), Wakeman decided to record a follow-up in the same format, recording a mixture of piano-oriented cover versions and original pieces. This time, some tracks include the Orion Orchestra and the English Chamber Choir.

== Production ==
Following the commercial and critical success of Wakeman's previous album, Piano Portraits (2017), Wakeman decided to produce a follow-up album. In April 2018, Wakeman announced that his manager had secured an agreement with Sony Masterworks to release it. Piano Odyssey continues the theme of the previous with a selection of original, cover versions, and classically-inspired compositions arranged by Wakeman for the piano, but contains additional orchestral arrangements from the London-based Orion Orchestra and the English Chamber Choir.

The album began with Wakeman meeting with management at Sony Masterworks to discuss its contents and Wakeman's plans for it. Both parties agreed that a follow-up to Piano Portraits should be more than another solo piano release and settled for some of the new tracks to be accompanied by an orchestra and choir. Wakeman then assembled a list of 40 tracks that he wanted to record for it and narrowed it down to 12 final songs. In a subsequent two-week period, Wakeman completed the piano arrangements for the tracks which was followed by the orchestral scores which took a further four weeks.

Wakeman recorded his piano parts in the course of a week at The Old Granary, a recording studio in a restored 18th century barn in Norfolk, with his longtime engineer Erik Jordan. He plays a Steinway Model D grand piano. With the piano tracks put down, a week was spent making alterations to the orchestral arrangements with conductor and arranger Guy Protheroe. Upon completion, the orchestra and choir was recorded across three days at Angel Recording Studios in London with Wakeman and Protheroe sharing conducting duties, and engineered by Toby Wood. By 10 May 2018, the album had entered the mixing stage.

Wakeman supported the album with a UK tour from September to December 2018, with the December dates featuring a Christmas-themed program.

== Track listing ==
No.	Title	Writer(s)	Length
1.	"While My Guitar Gently Weeps"	George Harrison	4.07
2.	"Liebesträume/After the Ball"	Franz Liszt/Rick Wakeman	5.41
3.	"And You and I"	Jon Anderson, themes by Bill Bruford, Steve Howe, Chris Squire	4.34
4.	"Rocky (The Legacy)"	Wakeman	6.25
5.	"The Boxer"	Paul Simon	5.14
6.	"Wild Eyed Boy from Freecloud"	David Bowie	4.55
7.	"Strawberry Fields Forever"	John Lennon, Paul McCartney	2.53
8.	"Roundabout"	Anderson, Howe	3.17
9.	"Cyril Wolverine"	Wakeman	5.19
10.	"Jane Seymour"	Wakeman	3.41
11.	"Largos"	George Frideric Handel, Antonin Dvorak	3.17
12.	"Bohemian Rhapsody"	Freddie Mercury	5.37

== Personnel ==
Music

- Rick Wakeman – Steinway Model D grand piano, conductor
- Orion Strings Orchestra
- English Chamber Choir
- Guy Protheroe – conductor, arrangement
- Brian May - guitar on "Bohemian Rhapsody"

Production

- Erik Jordan – engineer
- Toby Wood – engineer

== Charts ==
Chart (2018)	Peak position
Scottish Albums (OCC)	10
UK Albums (OCC)	7
UK Progressive Albums (OCC)	1
