= White Rock (album) =

Studio album by Rick Wakeman
- Released: January 1977
- Recorded: January–September 1976
- Studios: Advision, Fitzrovia and The Music Centre, Wembley
- Genre: Progressive rock
- Length: 34:52
- Label: A&M
- Producer: Rick Wakeman

Rick Wakeman chronology
No Earthly Connection (1976)	White Rock (1977)	Rick Wakeman's Criminal Record (1977)

Singles from Lisztomania
- 1. "White Rock" Released: June 1977 (US)

White Rock is the second soundtrack album by English keyboardist Rick Wakeman, released in January 1977 by A&M Records. It was produced as the soundtrack to White Rock, a 1977 documentary film about the 1976 Winter Olympics held in Innsbruck, Austria.

In 1999, Wakeman released a sequel soundtrack, White Rock II.

== Recording ==
Wakeman had forgotten about a track he had been asked to compose, titled "After the Ball". Instead of confessing to the producers that he forgot to write something, he said he had a composition ready and proceeded to play a completely improvised track. The first take was a success, without the need to record a second take. "After the Ball" has become part of Wakeman's repertoire, featured on several future albums and videos.

"Ice Run" uses parts of "Anne of Cleves", a track from Wakeman's first album, The Six Wives of Henry VIII (1973). The comparison can be made by listening to "Anne of Cleves" at 00:48 and "Ice Run" at 3:29.

== Critical reception ==
Professional ratings
Review scores
Source	Rating
AllMusic	3/5 stars
The Encyclopedia of Popular Music	2/5 stars
The New Rolling Stone Record Guide	2/5 stars

The Pittsburgh Press wrote that the album "is electronic, popular and interesting... Wakeman plays more keyboards than most people know exist."

== Track listing ==
Side one

1. "White Rock" – 3:10
2. "Searching for Gold" – 4:20
3. "The Loser" – 5:30
4. "The Shoot" – 3:59

Side two

1. "Lax'x" – 4:53
2. "After the Ball" – 3:03
3. "Montezuma's Revenge" (traditional) – 3:56
4. "Ice Run" – 6:11

== Personnel ==
Music

- Rick Wakeman – Moog synthesiser, Steinway grand piano, Mellotron, Mander pipe organ, RMI Computer Piano, marimba, RMI Rock-Si-Chord, Hohner clavinet, Fender Rhodes piano, Hammond C3 organ
- St Paul's Cathedral Choir
- Tony Fernandez – drums, percussion

Production

- Rick Wakeman – production, arrangements
- Paul Hardiman – mastering
- Richard Lewzey – assistant on "After the Ball" and "Montezuma's Revenge"
- Ken Thomas – tape operator

== Charts ==
Chart (1977)	Peak position
Australian Albums (Kent Music Report)	38
Canada Top Albums/CDs (RPM)	69
Norwegian Albums (VG-lista)	12
UK Albums (Official Charts)	14
US Billboard 200	126

== Certifications ==
Region	Certification	Certified units/sales
United Kingdom (BPI)	Silver	60,000^{^}
^{^} Shipments figures based on certification alone.
