= Gary Pickford-Hopkins =

- Born: 1948; Neath, Wales
- Died: 22 June 2013 (aged 65)
- Occupation: Musician
- Years active: 1964 – 2013
- Works: Journey to the Centre of the Earth and The Myths and Legends of King Arthur and the Knights of the Round Table
- Spouse: Sian Pickford-Hopkins
- Children: 2
- Musical career
- Genres: Rock, progressive rock, blues rock, Adult-oriented rock, classic rock.
- Instruments: Vocals, guitar, harmonica
- Labels: Chrysalis, Reprise, Angel Air, Wild Turkey Music, Roconda.

Gary Pickford-Hopkins (1948 – 22 June 2013) was a Welsh singer, composer and guitarist whose career began in the early 1960s. He is best known as co-lead vocalist with Ashley Holt on two of Rick Wakeman's most successful solo albums Journey to the Centre of the Earth and The Myths and Legends of King Arthur and the Knights of the Round Table.

== Career ==
Gary Pickford-Hopkins began his musical career at the age of 16 with a local Neath group called The Smokestacks in 1964. He soon joined Eyes Of Blue, who in 1966 won the Melody Maker's Battle of the Bands, they have recorded two albums, John Weathers was on drums and he would later follow Pickford-Hopkins to Wild Turkey and then join Gentle Giant. In 1970, he briefly joined Big Sleep, and a year later he went to play with Glenn Cornick's Wild Turkey which recorded three albums from 1971 to June 1974, when he joined Rick Wakeman's English Rock Ensemble to produce the live album Journey to the Centre of the Earth in 1974 which reached number one on the UK Albums Chart and peaked at number 3 on the Billboard 200 in the United States. It was certified gold in the United States and United Kingdom. He later sang on Wakeman's third solo album The Myths and Legends of King Arthur and the Knights of the Round Table.

Pickford-Hopkins later joined Network, who split up around 1979. By 1980 he was with The Houseband. He also had a brief spell with The Broadcasters and rejoined Wild Turkey again. Pickford-Hopkins produced his only solo album GPH in 2003.

== Personal life and death ==
Pickford-Hopkins first marriage was to Jan; they had twin sons. After their divorce Gary married his second wife Sian and they lived together in the village of Garnant in Wales. Pickford-Hopkins died of cancer on 22 June 2013.

== Discography ==
With Eyes Of Blue :

- The Crossroads Of Time (1968)
- In Fields Of Ardath (1969)

With Wild Turkey

- Battle Hymn (1971)
- Turkey (1972)
- Stealer of Years (1996)
- You & Me In The Jungle (2006)

Chick Churchill

- You And Me (1973) with Gary Pickford-Hopkins, Roger Hodgson, Cozy Powell and Martin Barre.

With the Rick Wakeman band (English Rock Ensemble) -Studio albums :

- The Myths and Legends of King Arthur and the Knights of the Round Table (1975)
- The Myths and Legends of King Arthur and the Knights of the Round Table (2016) With rerecorded parts.

-Live album :

- Journey to the Centre of the Earth (1974)

-Bootleg album :

- Unleashing The Tethered One - The 1974 North American Tour (1974)

-DVD :

- Journey to the Centre of the Earth - Live in Concert DVD (2002)
- Journey to the Centre of the Earth - 30th Anniversary Collectors Edition DVD (2016)

-Greatest Hits :

- Recollections: The Very Best of Rick Wakeman 1973-1979 (2000)

Solo album

- GPH (2003)

Selected singles

With Wild Turkey

- "Good Old Days" (1972)

Gary Pickford-Hopkins And Friends

- "Why?" (1986)

Gary Pickford Hopkins And Llanelli RFC

- "The Stradey Song" (1988)

== See also ==
- List of Welsh musicians
