= Piano Portraits =

Studio album by Rick Wakeman
- Released: 13 January 2017
- Recorded: July–August 2016
- Studio: The Old Granary Studio, Norfolk, England
- Genre: Classical piano
- Length: 61:10
- Label: Universal Music Group
- Producer: Rick Wakeman

Rick Wakeman chronology
The Myths and Legends of King Arthur and the Knights of the Round Table (2016)	Piano Portraits (2017)	Piano Odyssey (2018)

Piano Portraits is a studio album by English keyboardist Rick Wakeman, released on 13 January 2017 on Universal Music Group. The album was made following the positive reception to Wakeman's live radio performance of his piano arrangement of "Life on Mars?" by David Bowie following the singer's death in January 2016, and a subsequent single of the track released in aid of Macmillan Cancer Support released in 2016. After Wakeman received offers from several music labels to produce an album of piano arrangements, he chose Universal and chose songs that were his favourites: songs he had played on as a session musician, as a member of Yes, classical music pieces, and one original composition.

Piano Portraits was first released on CD and as a digital download. A double vinyl followed on 3 February 2017. The album reached number 6 on the UK Albums Chart, becoming Wakeman's highest charting album in the UK since 1975. Wakeman supported the album with a tour of the UK from May to November 2017. In June 2017, Piano Portraits was certified silver by the British Phonographic Industry for 60,000 copies sold. A follow-up album, Piano Odyssey, was released in October 2018.

== Background ==
In January 2016, Wakeman performed a piano arrangement of "Life on Mars?" by David Bowie that was broadcast live on BBC Radio 2 in the wake of the singer's death. Wakeman had played the piano on the original 1971 recording. Several days after, a video of the performance received 2 million views online, which sparked the idea for Wakeman to produce a single including the song, a piano arrangement of Bowie's "Space Oddity", and "Always Together", an original piano composition by Wakeman. The single was released in aid of Macmillan Cancer Support.

The positive response to video and single led to Wakeman receiving offers from several recording labels who suggested to record a solo piano album of rearranged songs in the same style. The idea appealed to Wakeman as the piano is his favourite instrument to work with. Among the offers received was one from Universal Music Group, which Wakeman chose as "they envisioned it exactly as I did — as a real mixture of music, not losing sight of what the original songs stood for but always working as piano pieces". He then selected songs that he had played on throughout his career, as well as renditions of classical music pieces and one original composition. Taking music from artists and "playing around" with the arrangements had always been something Wakeman had enjoyed doing since his college days. The first list of tracks to record contained 24 songs, which was reduced to a final selection of 15. Among the scrapped tracks was a proposed suite for "Bohemian Rhapsody" by Queen, but after three days working on it, Wakeman could not develop an arrangement that worked.

== Production ==
=== Recording ===
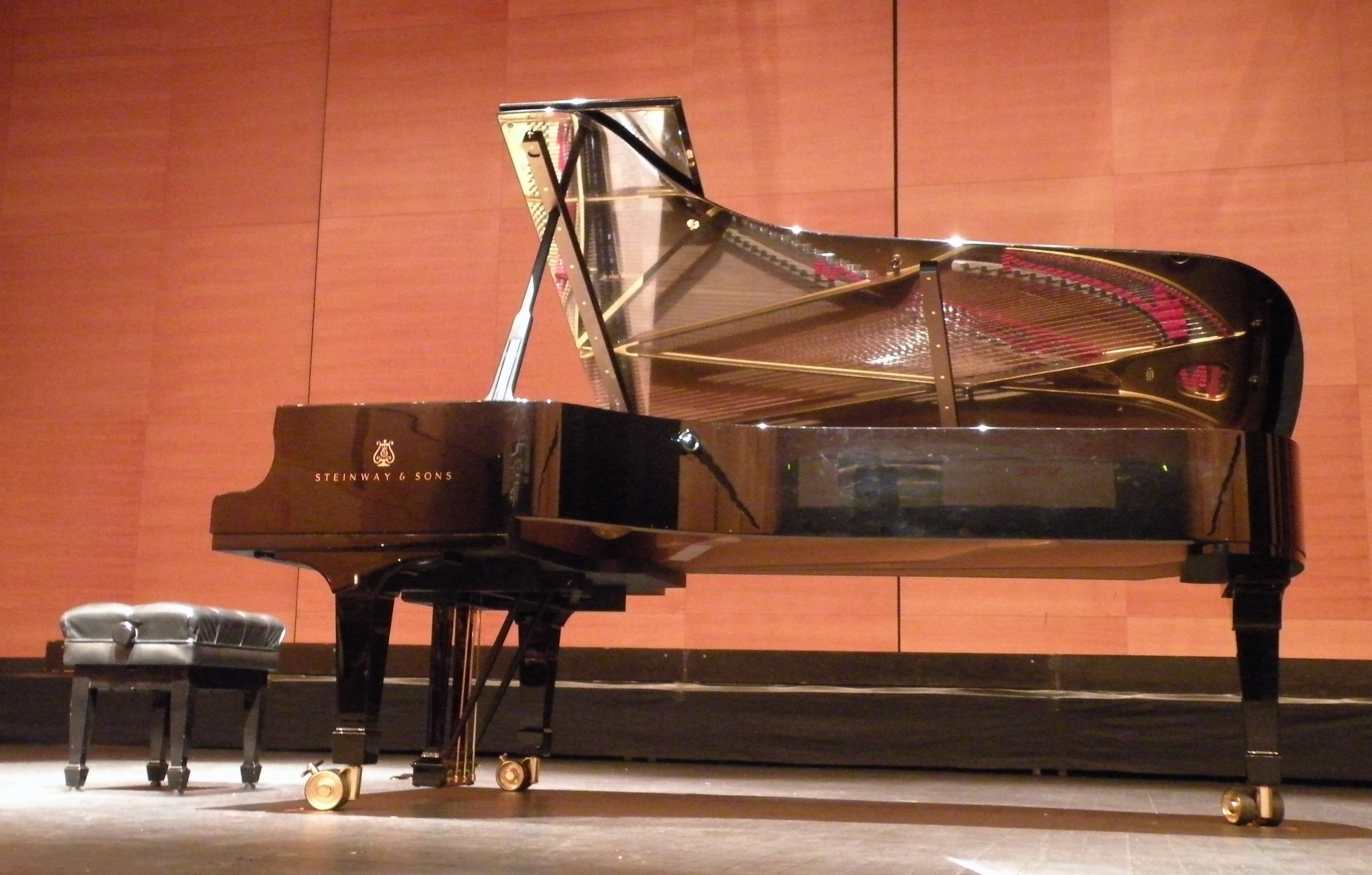
Wakeman plays a Steinway Model D concert grand piano on the album.

The album was recorded in July and August 2016 at The Old Granary, a restored 18th century barn and recording studio in Norfolk, with Erik Jordan as audio engineer. Wakeman performed each track on a Steinway Model D concert grand piano. Some of his rearrangements allowed for the addition of improvisation at some points, adding: "The way I do variations is instinctive, but I know what I'm going to do. If I played them all again for you now they would be probably 95% of what you hear". He compared the idea of rearranging music to classical music composers whose variations on a theme or piece by another were instinctively how they felt the pieces should be.

=== Songs ===
Wakeman's arrangement of "Help!" by The Beatles was inspired by the 1968 cover version by Deep Purple, and he performed his own version on stage through his career. "Stairway to Heaven" by Led Zeppelin is a track that Wakeman had always liked and enjoyed its melody, but had reservations about recording his arrangement for the album as he could "do it in one, or it's gonna fall apart". Wakeman played it through and felt happy enough to include the second take. The idea to include "I'm Not in Love" by 10cc was not Wakeman's, rather "someone at Universal". He liked the band but not the song as much, and encountered problems when it came to writing a theme to its chorus or bridge as neither his assistants or himself had an idea that worked. "I started playing around with it ... doing as much with the tune as I think can be done. So I played it through, and Erik said "You're almost there". I said it's a bit short, but he said "No, it's over three minutes. It does stand up". "Wonderous Stories" is a track Yes recorded for Going for the One (1977), which marked Wakeman's return to the band following his first departure. Wakeman decided to record a piano arrangement as it was one of the two tracks that were presented to him when he was asked to return to the group, which had "a great tune and some lovely lyrics" and represents happier times with the band.

== Release ==
Piano Portraits was released on CD and digital download on 13 January 2017. A double vinyl set followed on 3 February.

Upon release, the album entered the UK Albums Chart at number 7, marking Wakeman's highest position on the chart since The Myths and Legends of King Arthur and the Knights of the Round Table (1975) peaked at number 2. In its second week, the album climbed one position to number 6. Since the album's release, Wakeman said he is "genuinely thrilled with it".

Wakeman supported the album with a 10-date tour of the United Kingdom named Piano Portraits in Concert, from 25 May to 6 July 2017.

== Track listing ==
No.	Title	Writer(s)	Length
1.	"Help!"	John Lennon, Paul McCartney	3:56
2.	"Stairway to Heaven"	Robert Plant, Jimmy Page	6:13
3.	"Life on Mars"	David Bowie	3:23
4.	"I'm Not in Love"	Eric Stewart, Graham Gouldman	3:10
5.	"Wonderous Stories"	Jon Anderson	4:24
6.	"Berceuse"	Gabriel Fauré	4:28
7.	"Amazing Grace"	Traditional	3:56
8.	"Swan Lake"	Peter Tchaikovsky	4:29
9.	"Morning Has Broken"	Traditional	3:42
10.	"Summertime"	George Gershwin	4:07
11.	"Space Oddity"	David Bowie	4:47
12.	"Dance of the Damselflies"	Rick Wakeman	3:33
13.	"Clair de Lune"	Claude Debussy	3:06
14.	"I Vow to Thee, My Country"	Gustav Holst	2:57
15.	"Eleanor Rigby"	John Lennon, Paul McCartney	5:05
Total length:			61:10

== Personnel ==
Credits are adapted from the CD liner notes.

- Rick Wakeman – Steinway Model D concert grand piano

Production

- Erik Jordan – engineer
- Ian Brown – project co-ordinator
- Stylorouge – design
- Rob O'Connor – photographer
- Dick Beetham – mastering at 360 Mastering

== Charts ==
Chart (2017)	Peak position
Scottish Albums (OCC)	6
UK Albums (OCC)	6
UK Progressive Albums (OCC)	1

== Certifications ==
Region	Certification	Certified units/sales
United Kingdom (BPI)	Silver	60,000^{‡}
^{‡} Sales+streaming figures based on certification alone.
