= Sebastiane =

- Promotional poster
- Directed by: Derek Jarman; Paul Humfress
- Written by: Derek Jarman; Paul Humfress; James Whaley
- Produced by: Howard Malin; James Whaley
- Starring: Leonardo Treviglio; Barney James; Richard Warwick; Neil Kennedy
- Cinematography: Peter Middleton
- Edited by: Paul Humfress
- Music by: Brian Eno; Andrew Thomas Wilson
- Distributed by: Cinecycle
- Release date: 15 December 1976
- Running time: 85 minutes
- Country: United Kingdom
- Language: Latin

Sebastiane is a 1976 Latin-language British historical film directed by Derek Jarman and Paul Humfress and written by Jarman, Humfress and James Whaley. It portrays the events of the life of Saint Sebastian, including his iconic martyrdom by arrows. The film, which was aimed at a gay audience, was controversial for the homoeroticism portrayed between the soldiers and for having dialogue entirely in Latin.

== Plot ==
In the third century AD, Sebastian is a member of the Emperor Diocletian's personal guard. When he tries to intervene to stop one of the Emperor's catamites from being strangled by one of his bodyguards, Sebastian is exiled to a remote coastal garrison and reduced in rank to private. Sebastian is an early Christian and sublimates his desire for his male companions into the worship of his deity and pacifism. Both incense Severus, the commanding officer of the garrison, who becomes increasingly obsessed with Sebastian, tries to assault him, and ultimately presides over his summary execution for refusing to take up arms in defence of the Roman Empire. Justin, one of his comrades in arms, is also in love with Sebastian, albeit necessarily unrequited, but he forms a friendship with the stubborn celibate pacifist. Adrian and Anthony, two of Sebastian's fellow soldiers, are gay and obviously in love with one another.

== Cast ==
- Barney James as Severus
- Neil Kennedy as Maximus
- Leonardo Treviglio as Sebastian
- Richard Warwick as Justin
- Donald Dunham as Claudius
- Daevid Finbar as Julian
- Ken Hicks as Adrian
- Lindsay Kemp as Dancer
- Steffano Massari as Marius
- Janusz Romanov as Anthony
- Gerald Incandela as Leopard Boy
- Robert Medley as Emperor Diocletian

The emperor's guests included such notables as Peter Hinwood, Nell Campbell, and Patricia Quinn (all of Rocky Horror fame), Jordan, Philip Sayer, Charlotte Barnes, Nicholas de Jongh, Duggie Fields, Christopher Hobbs, Andrew Logan, and Johnny Rozsa.

== Reception ==
Margaret Walters, author of The Nude Male, commented that Sebastiane, "where male nudes in various stages of ecstasy positively littered the screen", was "successfully aimed at a very specialized homosexual audience."

== Home media ==
The film was released on DVD in the UK and the U.S. A Blu-ray disc was released in the U.S. on August 7, 2012.

== See also ==
- List of films set in ancient Rome
- List of historical drama films
- List of LGBTQ films
