= David Measham =

British musician

David Michael Lucian Measham (1 December 1937 – 6 February 2005) was a British-Australian conductor and violinist.

Measham was born in Nottingham, England, to a musical family. His father, Lester, had trained as an opera singer and his mother, Joan, was a pianist. He began violin studies at age 7, and first conducted at age 13. He attended the Mundella Grammar School (Nottingham), and later the Guildhall School of Music and Drama, London, where he studied with Norman Del Mar. He then became a section violinist with the BBC Symphony Orchestra. He served with the City of Birmingham Symphony Orchestra as co-leader (1963–1967) alongside John Georgiadis. He became principal second violin with the London Symphony Orchestra (LSO) in 1967 following Neville Marriner's departure.

At one rehearsal, Measham took over when the conductor, Leonard Bernstein, said he wanted to hear what the orchestra sounded like from the back of the hall and called for a volunteer conductor. He then had further assistance in conducting from Bernstein. Subsequently, in his conducting career, Measham was music director of Phoenix Opera, and chief conductor of the Stetson University Summer Institute in Florida. In 1971, Measham made his Royal Festival Hall conducting debut with the LSO, when he took over from Hans Schmidt-Isserstedt at the last minute on one 2-hour rehearsal.

Measham worked as a conductor with non-classical artists such as the saxophonist Ornette Coleman (The Skies Of America, 1972), Neil Young (Harvest, 1972) and on a full orchestral version of the Beatles' Sgt. Pepper's Lonely Hearts Club Band. In 1972, Measham conducted the LSO on Tommy, a full orchestral version of The Who's Tommy (1969). In 1974, Measham conducted the LSO on Rick Wakeman's Journey to the Centre of the Earth, touring the US and Canada with the American Symphony Orchestra, and Japan and later the New World Symphony Orchestra on The Myths and Legends of King Arthur and the Knights of the Round Table.

In 1971, Measham emigrated to Western Australia and was based in Perth. He was principal conductor of the West Australian Symphony Orchestra 1974-81, and its principal guest conductor 1981-86. There he gave many first performances, and took the orchestra on its first overseas tour, to Singapore, and to the Sydney Festival, before an audience of 120,000. In 1975, he began an indoor season of three Promenade Concerts as part of the Perth International Arts Festival, modelled on The Proms. He presented a radio series for ABC Classic FM called "Both Sides Of The Podium", where orchestra players discussed their experiences working with various conductors. His other interests in Perth included yachting, and he was a member of the Claremont Yacht Club and then Mounts Bay Sailing Club where he raced his own keel-boat.

Measham's recordings include several with flautist Sir James Galway. He also recorded works by Barber, Kabalevsky, Shostakovich, Vaughan Williams, John Ireland, Peggy Glanville-Hicks and John Carmichael, and the only commercial recording of Wilfred Josephs' Kaddish based Requiem.

Measham died of cancer of the pancreas, in Perth. His early marriage to the soprano Susan Shoemaker ended in divorce. His two children from his marriage, Aaron and Guenevere, survive him.
