= Red Sea (Warhorse album) =

Studio album by Warhorse
- Released: March 1972
- Genres: Heavy metal, progressive rock
- Length: 39:09
- Label: Vertigo
- Producers: Warhorse & Ian Kimmet

Warhorse chronology
Warhorse (1970)	Red Sea (1972)

Professional ratings
Review scores
Source	Rating
AllMusic	2/5 stars

Red Sea is the second and last album by the English hard rock band Warhorse. The band is most known for its bass player Nick Simper, the original bassist of Deep Purple.

== Background ==
The CD reissue on the Angel Air label has six previously unreleased bonus tracks, including a live version of "Ritual" (from the first Warhorse album) and five demos all written by bassist Simper which did not appear on any record before.

Richtie Unterberger claims, the album was "basically more of the same prog rock-proto metal". Except the song Confident But Wrong being more mainstream rock sounding or the soul based I (Who Have Nothing). Singer Ashley Holts performance was not praised as he was "tending to hit more annoying high notes". Back in Time was mentioned for its "unconscious models for the kind of singing" which was parodied by Spinal Tap.

== Track listing ==
All songs written by Warhorse, except where noted.

1. Red Sea 4:20
2. Back in Time 7:49
3. Confident But Wrong 4:46
4. Feeling Better 5:33
5. Sybilla 5:33
6. Mouthpiece (instrumental) 8:43
7. I (Who Have Nothing) (Carlo Donida / Jerry Leiber / Mike Stoller) 5:16

=== CD re-issue tracks ===
1. Bad Time (Nick Simper) 4:40
2. She Was My Friend (Simper) 4:55
3. Gypsy Dancer (Simper) 4:08
4. House of Dolls (Simper) 4:19
5. Standing Right Behind You 4:35

== Personnel ==
- Ashley Holt – vocals
- Pete Parks – guitar
- Nick Simper – bass
- Frank Wilson – keyboards, organ, piano
- Mac Poole – drums

== Additional personnel ==
- Peter Parks – acoustic guitar

== Production ==
- Warhorse & Ian Kimmet - Producers
- Rick Breach – photography, sleeve art, sleeve design
- Dave Stock – engineer
- Phillip Walker – liner notes
- Nick Watson – remastering (CD reissue)
