= Barney James =

English actor, drummer (1944–2016)

- Born: 11 November 1944; Salford, Lancashire, England, U.K.
- Died: 29 March 2016 (aged 71) Henley-on-Thames, Oxfordshire, England, U.K.
- Genres: Rock, progressive rock, pop, jazz fusion, classical
- Occupations: Drummer, actor
- Instrument: Drums
- Years active: 1970–2016
- Formerly of: Warhorse
- Website: Barneyjames.co.uk

Barney James (11 November 1944 – 11 April 2016) was an English musician, actor and writer.

He was known as the drummer with the band Warhorse and for Rick Wakeman. His acting credits include the Derek Jarman films, the 1976 historical film Sebastiane and the 1978 drama film Jubilee.

== Life and career ==
After a career in the armed forces, James studied percussion in Manchester at the Johnny Roadhouse School of Music and the Northern School of Music. He played with a series of bands including Witnesses, Gracious, Forum, Legend, Warhorse and Rick Wakeman. With Wakeman, James played on the albums Journey to the Centre of the Earth (1974) and The Myths and Legends of King Arthur and the Knights of the Round Table (1975).

He later continued to work in the music industry as a session musician with artistsm including Dusty Springfield, P. J. Proby, Billy Joel, Frank Zappa, Kenny Loggins, John Martyn, Kiki Dee, James Taylor and Herbie Hancock.

=== Death ===
James died at the age of 71 at his home in Henley-on-Thames, Oxfordshire, and was survived by two daughters.
