= James Royal =

British singer

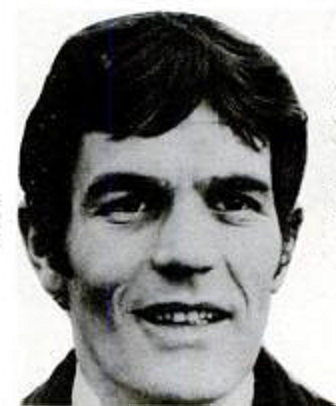
- James Royal in 1968

Background information
- Born: James Nairn; 14 July 1938 (age 87); Ealing, Middlesex, England
- Genres: Rock, pop
- Occupation: Singer
- Instrument: Vocals
- Years active: 1964-1973
- Labels: Decca, Parlophone, CBS

James Royal (born James Nairn, 14 July 1938) is a British pop singer. His most international successful record was "Call My Name" in 1967.

== Life and career ==
James Nairn was born on 14 July 1938 in Ealing, near London."Archived copy". Archived from the original on 27 May 2023. (Some later sources give his year of birth as 1941."James Royal born 14 July 1941". fromthevaults-boppinbob.blogspot.com.) After leaving secondary school, he served three years in the Royal Air Force."James Royal: Album review". louderthanwar.com.

In 1963 he formed a band that performed in London pubs and clubs under the name Jimmy Royal and the Hawks."The Early Radio London Fab Forties". radiolondon.co.uk. The group recorded its first track in 1964 for Decca, followed by singles in 1965 for Parlophone, the second of which was credited to “James Royal.” He soon emerged as a solo artist.

Royal signed with CBS in 1966, and his first release for the label, “Call My Name” (1967), became a hit in continental Europe. The single reached No. 11 in France in December 1967"Top 40 TMP France". laurentpons.com. and No. 4 in Belgium in March 1968."Hits of the World – Belgium". Billboard. 13 March 1968. p. 59. Although it failed to chart in the UK, ‘’Record World’’ later highlighted it as an example of foreign songs that found success in France despite limited recognition in their country of origin.Michel Brillié (28 December 1968), "À Paris – Yéyé Exits with Year; New Music Trends Click", Record World, vol. 23, no. 1125, p. 50

Between 1966 and 1970 CBS issued eleven of his singles and one album, with additional releases tailored to markets such as Germany, Spain, and Italy. During this period, Royal was often described as a British blue-eyed soul singer.

In 1970 Royal left CBS to join impresario Mervyn Conn’s Carnaby label, which produced six singles and two albums, including Spanish-language versions for overseas markets."International News Report – London". Billboard. 22 August 1970. p. 81. His 1971 single “Carolina,” written by Terry Britten, achieved success in France, Spain, Italy, Argentina, and Australia.

Royal recorded three albums between 1970 and 1973, along with singles in multiple languages for specific markets. In 1972 he also toured with Jerry Lee Lewis. By the end of the decade, however, his recording career had slowed. In 1984 he emigrated to Australia, his wife’s native country, and settled in Toowoomba in 1988.Calcino, Chris. "Rock star looks back on career" (pdf). thechronicle.com.

== Discography ==
=== Singles ===
- 1965: (James Royal and the Hawks) "She's About a Mover" / "Black Cloud" ( Parlophone R 5290)
- 1965: "Work Song" / "I Can't Stand It" (Parlophone R 5383)
- 1967: "Call My Name" / "When It Comes to My Baby" (CBS 2525)
- 1967: "It's All in the Game" / "Green Games" (CBS 2739)
- 1967: "I Can't Stand It" / "A Little Bit of Rain" (CBS 2959)
- 1968: "Take Me Like I Am" / "Sitting In The Station" (CBS 3232)
- 1968: "Hey Little Boy" / "Thru' The Love" (CBS 3450)
- 1968: "A Woman Called Sorrow" / "Fire" (CBS 3624)
- 1969: "Time Hangs On My Mind" / "Anna-Lee " (CBS 3797)
- 1969: "House Of Jack" / "Which Way To Nowhere" (CBS 3915)
- 1969: "I've Got Something Bad On My Mind" / "She's Independent" (CBS 4139)
- 1969: "Sent Out Love" / "I've Lost You" (CBS 4463)
- 1970: "And Soon The Darkness" / "I'm Going Home" (CBS 5032)
- 1971: "Noah" / "Big Heat (on the Loose)" (Carnaby [UK] / Global 6004 978 [Germany])
- 1971: "Ol' Man River" / "Conspiracy Of Cards" (Carnaby [UK], Global 6004 997 [Germany])
- 1971: "This Is My Woman" / "Noah" (Carnaby)
- 1971: "Noah" / "The Children Outside" (Carnaby)
- 1971: "Carolina" / "Woman Called Sorrow" (Carnaby 6151 002)
- 1972: (Jimmy Royal & Liz Christian) "Two of Us" / "Who Are We" (Carnaby 6151 006)
- 1973: "Lazy Mazie" / "Shining Sun" (Global 22523)

=== Albums ===
- 1964: (Jimmy Royal and the Hawks, various artists) Ready, Steady - Win! (Decca LK 4634)
- 1969: Call My Name (CBS S63780)
- 1970: One Way (Carnaby CNLS 6008)
- 1971: The Light And Shade Of James Royal (Carnaby 6302011)
- 1973: (Jimmy Royal) Stone Cold Soul (Nashville International NAL 5006; also (as James Royal) Global Records 26008 [Germany])
- 2017: Call My Name: Selected Recordings 1964-1970 (RPM Records Retro-989), retrospective compilation.
