= Paul Fischer (luthier) =

British musical instrument maker (b.1941)

Paul Fischer (born Isle of Man 1941), a British maker of musical instruments, began making harpsichords and clavichords in 1956 in Oxford under the tutelage of Robert Goble, with further study at the Oxford College of Art and Technology.

After military service (11th Hussars) he joined the lute and guitar maker David Rubio at Duns Tew, Oxfordshire. With the benefit of Fischer's experience, Rubio began making harpsichords, soon to be followed by theorbos, viheulas, pandoras, citterns and baroque guitars. Bowed instruments were to follow. As the workforce expanded to meet increasing demand, Fischer was appointed manager and oversaw the making of this wide range of instruments until establishing his own studio in 1975.

Fischer set up shop in Chipping Norton. The award of a Winston Churchill Fellowship and Southern Arts bursary at this time, provided the opportunity to take up the challenge. From this and the work of physicist Dr. Bernard Richardson the 'Taut' system of construction was developed.

== See also ==
- Classical guitar making
