= Journey to the Centre of the Earth (album) =

Live album by Rick Wakeman
- Released: 3 May 1974
- Recorded: 18 January 1974
- Venues: Royal Festival Hall, London, England with Ronnie Lane's Lyn Mobile Studio
- Genres: Progressive rock; symphonic rock
- Length: 40:07
- Label: A&M
- Producer: Rick Wakeman

Rick Wakeman chronology
The Six Wives of Henry VIII (1973)	Journey to the Centre of the Earth (1974)	The Myths and Legends of King Arthur and the Knights of the Round Table (1975)

Journey to the Centre of the Earth is a live album and third overall by English keyboardist Rick Wakeman, released on 3 May 1974 by A&M Records. It was recorded in concert at the Royal Festival Hall in London, England on 18 January 1974, staged for the premiere of his symphonic rock adaptation of Jules Verne's 1864 science-fiction novel of the same name. It tells the story of Professor Lidinbrook, his nephew Axel, and their guide Hans, who follow a passage to the Earth's centre originally discovered by Arne Saknussemm, an Icelandic alchemist. He performs with the London Symphony Orchestra and English Chamber Choir conducted by David Measham, and a group of former pub bandmates and session musicians which became his own rock band, the English Rock Ensemble. Actor David Hemmings narrates the story.

Wakeman had wanted to make the album as early as 1971, but shelved it until he had completed his first album, The Six Wives of Henry VIII (1973), and had written some music for it. He was inspired by Sergei Prokofiev's Peter and the Wolf, which featured a narrator and the music depicting the action, and felt Verne's novel was ideal for a musical adaptation. After Measham and show producer Lou Reizner agreed to take part Wakeman finalised the music, lyrics, and narration intermittently in 1973, and enlisted Wil Malone and Danny Beckerman to produce the orchestra and choir arrangements. The high costs for a studio recording led to the decision to record the work live, and Wakeman mortgaged his home and sold possessions to help finance the production. The finished album was poorly received by A&M management in England who refused to sell it, but American co-owner Jerry Moss heard the record and ordered its release.

The album became a symbol of the excesses of progressive rock genre, but was praised for its strong melodies and orchestration. It was a commercial hit worldwide and established Wakeman as a prominent contemporary rock composer and virtuoso performer. It reached No. 1 on the UK Albums Chart, the first A&M album to do so, and No. 3 on the Billboard 200 in the US, and was certified Gold in both countries and Australia, Canada, and Brazil. It was nominated for an Ivor Novello Award and a Grammy Award for Best Pop Instrumental Performance. A world tour with an orchestra followed in 1974 and 1975, which proved costly and left Wakeman in considerable debt. In 1999, a sequel to commemorate the 25th anniversary of the original was released entitled Return to the Centre of the Earth. After the original and uncut orchestral score was rediscovered, Wakeman re-recorded the album in 2012 with the 18 minutes of music that was cut due to time constraints.

== Background ==
=== Origins ===
By January 1973, Wakeman had been the keyboardist in the progressive rock band Yes for almost one-and-a-half years, and released his first solo album, The Six Wives of Henry VIII, a concept album inspired by the six wives of King Henry VIII, for A&M Records, to which he was signed as a solo artist. The album was a commercial hit, reaching No. 7 in the UK and No. 30 in the US. Wakeman wanted his next album to tell a story, which he was inspired to do since his father took him to a concert performance of Peter and the Wolf by Sergei Prokofiev as a young boy, which features a narrator and an orchestra depicting the action. A fan of science-fiction, Wakeman had first read Jules Verne's 1864 novel Journey to the Centre of the Earth when he was twelve, and gained confidence by talking to people in pubs, where he found most had heard of Verne and the novel, but few knew the story. The book presented a wide range of possibilities for a musical adaptation which attracted Wakeman the most. He settled on the idea as early as November 1971, but shelved the project until he had finished recording The Six Wives of Henry VIII in October 1972, and had some music written and money to finance it.

Development progressed in December 1972 when Wakeman took part as a guest musician in the orchestral concerts of The Who's Tommy, which featured the London Symphony Orchestra and English Chamber Choir conducted by David Measham, and music arranger Wil Malone. Wakeman told his idea for Journey to the show's producer, Lou Reizner, who put him in contact with Measham to discuss it further. By this time Wakeman had proceeded to read the book multiple times, and summarised the story in narration form. He wrote down sketches of the music at the piano "as fast as they appeared in my brain", which were used to produce a rough demo tape of the work using a Minimoog synthesiser, Mellotron, Rhodes piano, and clavinet. He played it for Measham who agreed to take part. Wakeman then announced the album to his manager Brian Lane (who also managed Yes), and expressed his wish to use the London Symphony Orchestra, English Chamber Choir, a rock band, and narrator. The cost to record it in a studio was too high, so A&M agreed to record a live performance in concert. Wakeman used all his earnings from The Six Wives of Henry VIII, mortgaged his home, and sold several of his cars to help cover the production costs, which Melody Maker reported to be £20,000 at the time although Wakeman later said it was in fact double. On the day of the concert, Wakeman received a writ from Express Dairies as he had not paid his milk bill for two months.

=== Writing ===
Wakeman worked on the music, lyrics, and narration intermittently throughout 1973 at his home in Buckinghamshire and in Devon, and wrote the music in order from beginning to end. It was his first attempt at song writing, which he found the most difficult parts of the score to write. He also lacked confidence as a lyricist and described his original set as "really bad", which prompted a rewrite.

Wakeman did not intend to fuse the orchestra and his band, but felt the correct use of both and a choir could add "phenomenal colour" to such a work. Malone and Danny Beckerman assisted with the orchestra and choir arrangements; Beckerman had also worked on the Tommy concerts and met Wakeman during an Australian tour with Yes. A typical session saw Malone devising chords and melody lines and Beckerman transcribing the parts onto a score, which took several hours. The project was a challenge for Malone, for it was his first attempt at writing for a symphony orchestra despite not being classically trained and was something "completely different" to what he had done before.

The original completed score ran for 55 minutes, but was reduced to 40 to fit the time constraints of a vinyl LP. The story is divided into four tracks with two on each side: "The Journey", "Recollection", "The Battle", and "The Forest". The finale of the latter includes an excerpt of "In the Hall of the Mountain King" from Edvard Grieg's Peer Gynt suite. In the liner notes Wakeman thanked Grieg and acknowledged he "stole a few bars".

=== Performers ===
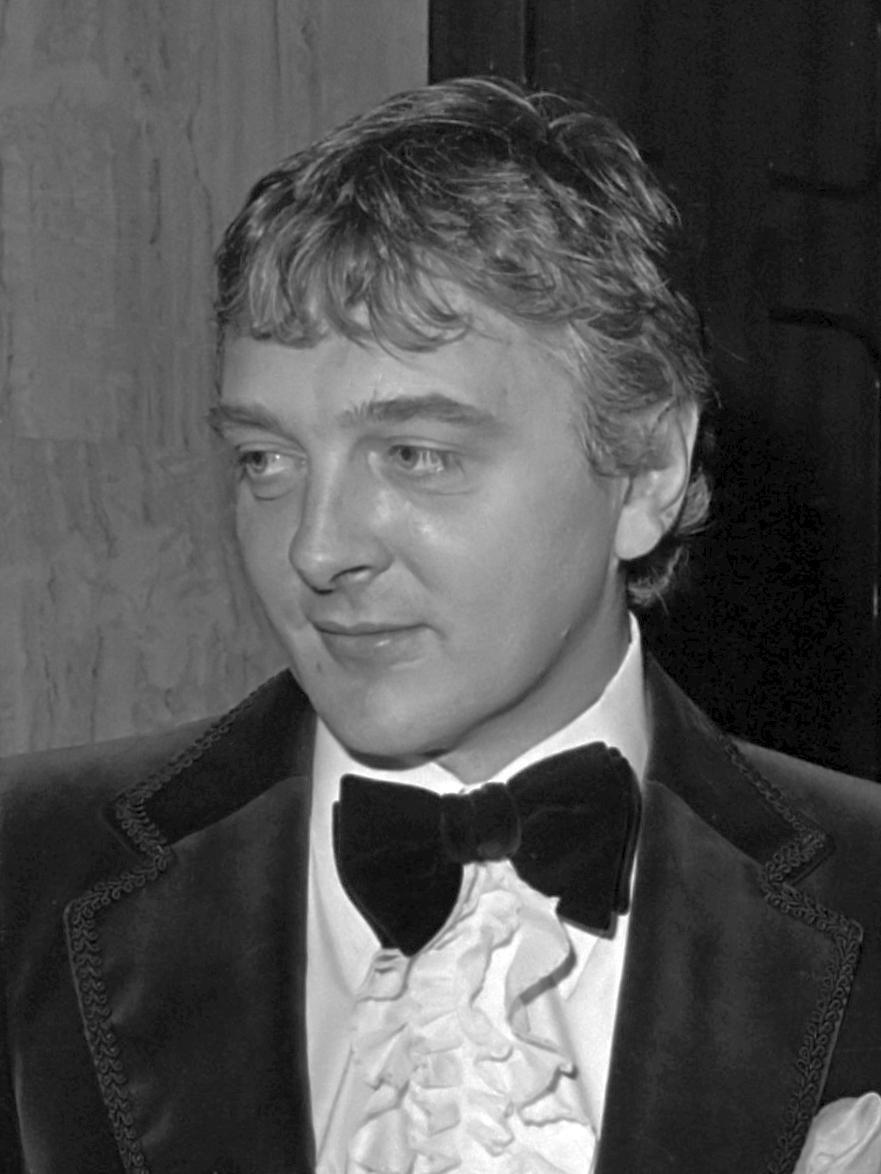
David Hemmings is the narrator

A&M considered a group of widely known musicians in Wakeman's band was crucial for the album's success, but Wakeman wanted it to be remembered for its music and not the performers. Instead he chose a group of musicians that he jammed with on Sunday evenings at the Valiant Trooper, a pub in Holmer Green in Buckinghamshire, which became a popular local attraction. "One Sunday evening I was playing keyboards with the lads when I thought, they could play Journey for me. I'm sure they could do the concert and do it well".

The band featured Ashley Holt of Warhorse on lead vocals, who had played in a dance band with Wakeman in late 1960s, and second lead vocalist Gary Pickford-Hopkins of Wild Turkey. Wakeman said a second lead vocalist was used to provide an extra interpretation of the lyrics, and Pickford-Hopkins was an "ideal contrast" to Holt's singing. Drummer Barney James was also of Warhorse, and bassist Roger Newell had played in the Valiant Trooper. After a group rehearsal convinced Wakeman they were capable he brought in session guitarist Mike Egan, who had also played on The Six Wives of Henry VIII. The decision greatly concerned Lane, who predicted a group of unknown musicians would be the "kiss of death" for the album, and Derek Green, the managing director of the British division at A&M, said it was "too frightening to contemplate", but nonetheless gave the green-light.

Actor and singer Richard Harris was Wakeman's first choice for the narrator, but he was unavailable. During a subsequent meeting at the Hemdale Company offices in London, actor and company co-founder David Hemmings walked in and offered to take part.

== Plot ==
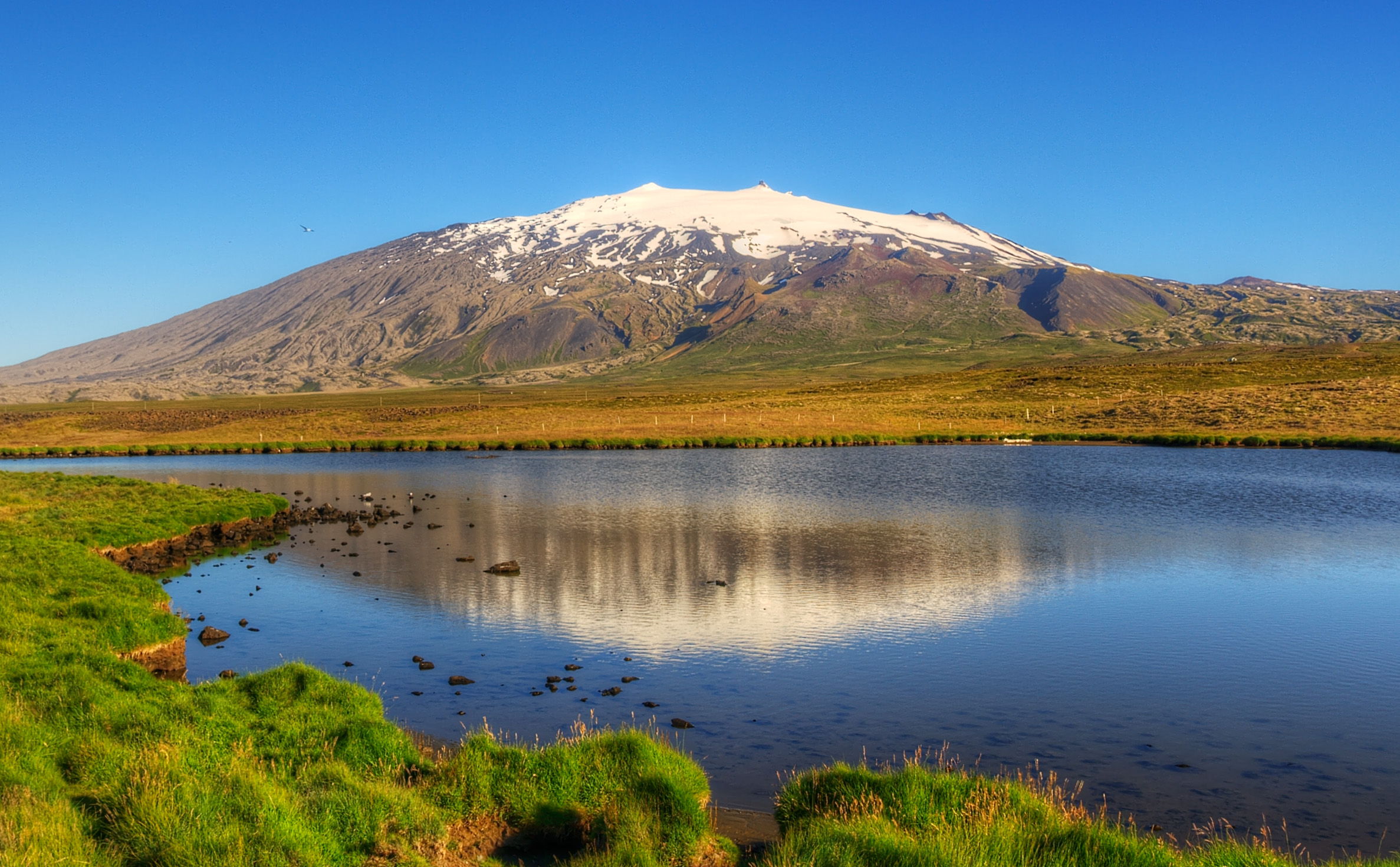
The travellers begin their descent at Snæfellsjökull in Iceland

Set in 1863, German Professor Lidinbrook discovers an old parchment that detailed a journey to the centre of Earth undertaken by Arne Saknussemm, an Icelandic alchemist. The parchment, when decoded into Latin and translated by Lidinbrook's nephew Axel, reveals an entrance to the route in the extinct volcano of Snæfellsjökull in Iceland. The pair embark on their journey from Hamburg with their guide Hans.

Upon entering the volcano they pass a lava gallery and find themselves in an intersection of two paths. Lidinbrook chooses the eastern tunnel, but after three days the trio reach a dead end. They returned with just one day's supply of water, reaching the intersection weak and tired. After sleep, they continued their journey and Hans hears flowing water behind a wall of rock and attacks it with a pick axe, revealing a stream of boiling water that they let cool. They realise it is a flowing guide to the centre of the Earth and name the stream the Hansbach, in the guide's honour ("The Journey"). The three temporarily separate, and a lone Axel becomes increasingly frightened. Thinking of those left at home, he cries and runs through a tunnel blindly. He almost gives up, then hears Lidinbrook's voice in the distance; he calculates he is just four miles apart and sets off to reunite. At one point the ground beneath Axel collapses and he awakens on a seashore with Lidinbrook and Hans besides an ocean, which they name the Lindinbrook Sea ("Recollection").

The trio build a raft and set sail for a port they name after Axel's fiancée, Port Grauben. Five days into their sail, they witness a battle between an ichthyosaurus and a plesiosaurus. The ichthyosaurus wins, and the travellers are hit with a four-day storm and take shelter by some overhanging rocks. The storm had caused them to travel only some miles north of Port Grauben, so they set out on land to track Saknussem's original route once more. They cross a plain of bones and into a forest inhabited by giant mastodons led by a 12-foot-high (3.7 m) Proteus, a mythological human ("The Battle"). Stunned, the three flee the forest for the Lidinbrook Sea and enter a dark tunnel that plunged deep into rock which they blast through with dynamite. The explosion causes an earthquake, and they become trapped in an active volcano shaft which projects them to the Earth's surface at Mount Etna in Sicily ("The Forest").

== Production ==
=== Concerts ===
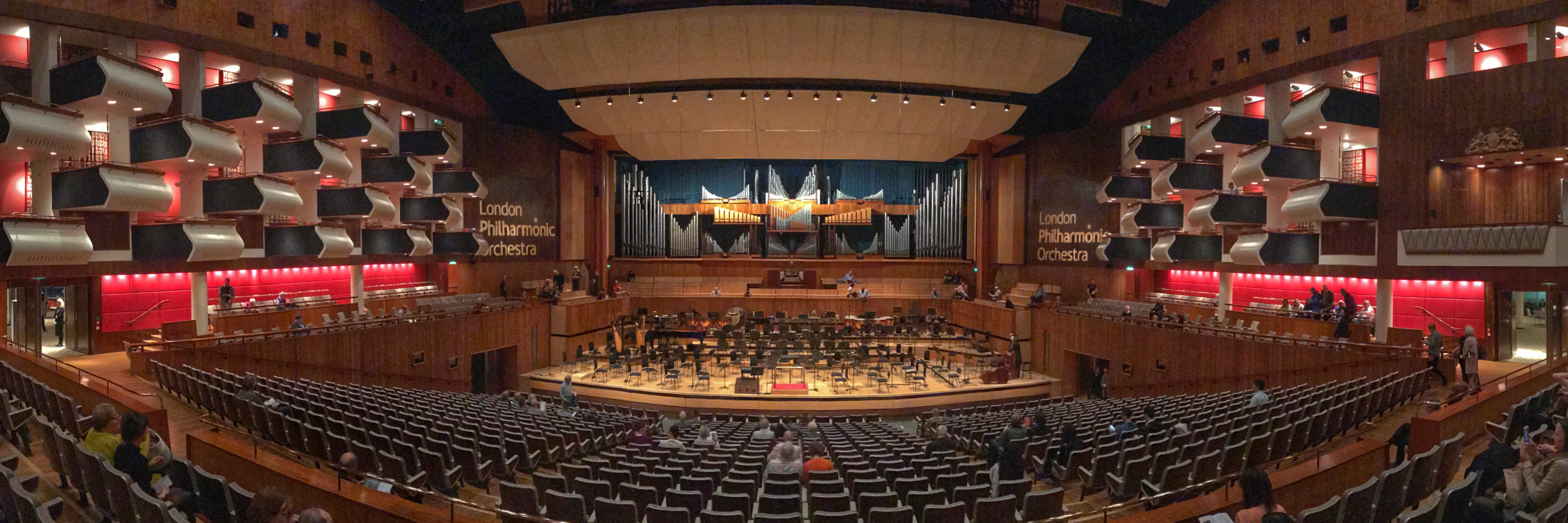
The Royal Festival Hall auditorium

The concerts were announced in October 1973, and organised for 18 January 1974 at the Royal Festival Hall in London, during a break in Yes' tour to promote Tales from Topographic Oceans (1973). The band entered rehearsals in December 1973 at Farmyard Studios in Little Chalfont in Buckinghamshire, and joined the orchestra for six full rehearsals from 5 January 1974. The stress and worry surrounding the concerts took a toll on Wakeman's health; he had not slept for three days before the show, contracted a stomach ulcer, and required emergency dental surgery for a cracked tooth and nerve damage. Music reporter Tony Tyler attended one of the rehearsals: "I've never seen him look worse ... The famous hair resembled a can of yellow paint poured over his skull ... I watched him rehearse himself and his band into a coma." Final rehearsals began at 9 a.m. on the day of the concerts. Wakeman recalled that for the first time in his life, "I was nervous as hell. I suddenly realised I wasn't sharing the responsibility. It was all down to me."

The shows were held at 6 and 8 p.m. to a sold-out audience of 3,000 each; both shows lasted for one hour and forty minutes. Wakeman was unable to secure two seats for his parents, and resorted to buying a pair for £15 from a ticket tout. A screen placed above the stage was used to present stock footage of mountains and underground caves at first, until 20th Century Fox granted permission to use clips from the 1959 American film adaptation. Plans to film the concerts for a prospective home video release fell through. Bassist Roger Newell recalled several politicians, John Lennon, Yoko Ono, Paul McCartney, Yes guitarist Steve Howe, and Peter Sellers in attendance. Hemmings sat on a throne with the narrative script on his lap. He had a black eye at the time, after his wife found out he had cheated on her and had hit him. Wakeman's then-wife administered makeup to disguise the bruising.

Wakeman wanted the first half of the concerts to be "musical and entertaining" in order to ease the audience into Journey, which took up the second. It opened with the finale of Sergei Rachmaninoff's Symphony No. 1 followed by "Catherine Parr", "Catherine Howard", and "Anne Boleyn" from The Six Wives of Henry VIII. Two comical segments followed; "A Road to Ruin" (which Wakeman credited to a "Jules Hernia"), was a solo piano piece accompanied by footage of Laurel and Hardy and various silent films assembled by film editor Philip Howe (brother of Steve). The film arrived at the venue too soon for Wakeman to view it beforehand, so he improvised on stage. The second was a rearrangement of "Twelfth Street Rag" (introduced as "Douzième Rue Tapis") with a The Big Ben Banjo Band cover and black and white minstrels. The encore was "The Pearl and Dean Piano Concerto", an orchestral and piano piece of several television advert themes, including Opal Fruits, Fairy washing up liquid, and Maynards Murray Mints. Music journalist Chris Welch noted: "Several members of the choir could be seen jiving during the more rhythmic moments, and when Rick played some beautiful classical piano, approving nods could be detected from the massed ranks of the orchestra". A party was held after the second show which Wakeman did not attend due to exhaustion. According to Welch, "The work and tension had finally caught up with Rick – and he was driven home – asleep".

=== Post-production ===
Wakeman intended to record both performances and use the better one, or use sections from both, for release, but the orchestra's union requested double pay. This led to the "frightening decision" to record only the second show. Ronnie Lane's Lyn Mobile Studio was used for recording which housed a 16-track desk that was operated by Keith Grant, who was chosen for his engineering experience. The first half of the concert was recorded to test the audio and recording equipment and was not intended for release, but a rough mix was accidentally discovered years later on a poorly conditioned and mislabelled tape initially used as a guide for the mastering. It was digitally remastered and released on The Missing Half CD as part of Wakeman's limited edition box set Treasure Chest (2002). The CD also contains humorous narration from Hemmings in five dialects, recorded while he and Wakeman had been drinking while the album was being mixed.

The album was edited, produced, and mixed by Wakeman at Morgan Studios in Willesden, London between 21 and 29 January 1974, with assistance from engineer Paul Tregurtha. There were several problems with the recording upon playback. Wakeman deemed the band's equipment and instruments hired for the one-off event as unsuitable for such a large venue, and someone outside the venue accidentally kicked out a cable that carried Pickford-Hopkins' lead vocals to the mobile shortly after recording had started. Some of his vocals were re-recorded and synchronised with Holt's and by boosting the other microphones on the stage. A snare drum and one of the drum microphones broke during the performance, which was remedied by cutting the drum track out of the affected section from the middle of the recording tape and replacing it with a new track played in the studio, a process that took several hours. Hemmings flew into London from a film shoot to re-recorded some narration after a tape change occurred during one of his parts. There were four bars of what Wakeman described as a "complete shambles" between the orchestra and the band, which was patched up using an identical passage that occurred later in the piece.

A&M wanted the album finished quickly for a February 1974 release, but the additional time required to fix the recording, and a vinyl shortage happening at the time, pushed the release to early April, and once again to May. This sparked concern from management for potential bootlegs to be sold, but the label later reported that it would "tie in more conveniently with Wakeman's plans" as he had resumed touring with Yes which was scheduled to end in the same month. Another factor in the delay was a paper shortage as the original design consisted of a gatefold sleeve with an 8-page booklet, but the designer refused to reduce the package to a standard sleeve. Wakeman heard final cuts of the album while on tour and rejected several of them. "I just didn't like the sound, and it was worth doing it properly for the sake of a few extra days".

== Release ==
The finished album was poorly received by A&M management in England who refused to sell it. However, as Wakeman was under contract with the American division a cassette was delivered to label co-founder Jerry Moss in California, who had signed Wakeman. Moss liked the tape and subsequently ordered the London office to release it. Released on 3 May 1974, the album was No. 1 in the UK for the week ending on 25 May, the first A&M record to achieve this feat. It peaked at No. 3 on the US Billboard 200 for two weeks in July during a stay of 27 weeks. Elsewhere, the album reached No. 2 in Canada and Australia. Time magazine reported that the album became "a multiimillion-dollar seller in six weeks.

Wakeman was nominated for an Ivor Novello Award for the album, and it earned him a Grammy Award nomination for Best Pop Instrumental Performance. The record was certified gold by the Recording Industry Association of America in September 1974. It was the first A&M title released in the four-channel Quadradisc CD-4 format.

In 1999, marking the album's 25th anniversary, Wakeman released a sequel titled Return to the Centre of the Earth. The story follows a group of adventurers who attempt to follow the previous expedition to the Earth's centre as discovered by Saknussemm.

In May 2016, a CD and DVD Super Deluxe Edition box set was released containing a new remaster of the original album, live performances from 1974 and 1993, and a DVD-Audio with a Quad surround sound and Mobile Fidelity Sound Lab mixes.

=== Reception ===
Professional ratings
Review scores
Source	Rating
AllMusic	4/5 stars
Rolling Stone	(favourable)

The album received a mostly positive reception from critics. Derek Jewell of The Sunday Times missed the concert, but thought on record the music "comes over magnificently ... a striking work which only occasionally lapses into pretentiousness". New Musical Express reporter Tony Tyler attended the show and noted its strength in melody and organisation and overall "worked very well" with "no embarrassing excesses". Chris Welch of Melody Maker thought the album "might be described as 'lightweight' or of 'little consequence.' But as far as popular music is concerned, Rick's composition for choir, orchestra and group is entertaining, fresh and disarmingly unpretentious." He continued: "This could be a score for a Hollywood musical – tuneful, but with epic overtones." Welch predicted the album would mark a new phase in Wakeman's career, "when he will be appreciated as much for his writing as his flair and proficiency as a keyboard virtuoso." The album received some negative reaction upon its release, with music critics having described the record as a "classical pastiche...genuinely appalling" and "brutal synthesiser overkill". Journey however, was well received by others. In a retrospective review, Mike DeGange of Allmusic called the album "one of progressive rock's crowning achievements" and noted "interesting conglomerations of orchestral and synthesized music".

=== Tour ===
In July 1974, Wakeman headlined the Crystal Palace Garden Party concert, performing the album in its entirety with selections from The Six Wives of Henry VIII. Wakeman decided to use the small lake in front of Crystal Palace Bowl as part of the show; balloon versions of the dinosaurs were built to act out the album's climactic fight. When deployed, rising from the water, they failed to fully inflate, collapsed into each other and got stuck in front of the stage. The audience, many under the influence of hallucinogens, jumped into the lake to join them.

The morning of that show, Wakeman had lost consciousness and collapsed in his home, suffering several bruises. He attributed it to the fatigue of preparing for the show. During the performance, he suffered lightheadedness and felt as if he were floating. The next morning, with the band at his house making preparations to take the show on a world tour, Wakeman was on the phone with a journalist when he again fell to the floor, this time regaining consciousness, but suddenly feeling very sick. He was taken to hospital where doctors determined that he had suffered a heart attack, perhaps his third in the last 24 hours. Due to his relative youth at the time, it was attributed to the stress of touring combined with Wakeman's heavy smoking and drinking. Advised to remain in hospital for nine months and possibly retire, at least from touring, Wakeman instead went ahead with his tour plans.

The tour, his debut tour as a solo artist, started with a North American leg in September and October 1974. He was joined by his band, the English Rock Ensemble, formed of drummer Barney James, guitarist Jeffrey Crampton, vocalists Ashley Holt and Gary Pickford-Hopkins, bassist Roger Newell, and percussionist John Hodgson. Each show saw the group performing with the 45-piece National Philharmonic Orchestra and the 16-piece Choir of America, both formed of freelance musicians based in New York City, conducted by Measham with Terry Taplin as narrator. Under doctors orders, Wakeman was required to pass a heart monitor test prior to each show. The tour visited Japan, Australia, and New Zealand between January and March 1975.

== 2012 re-recording and performances ==
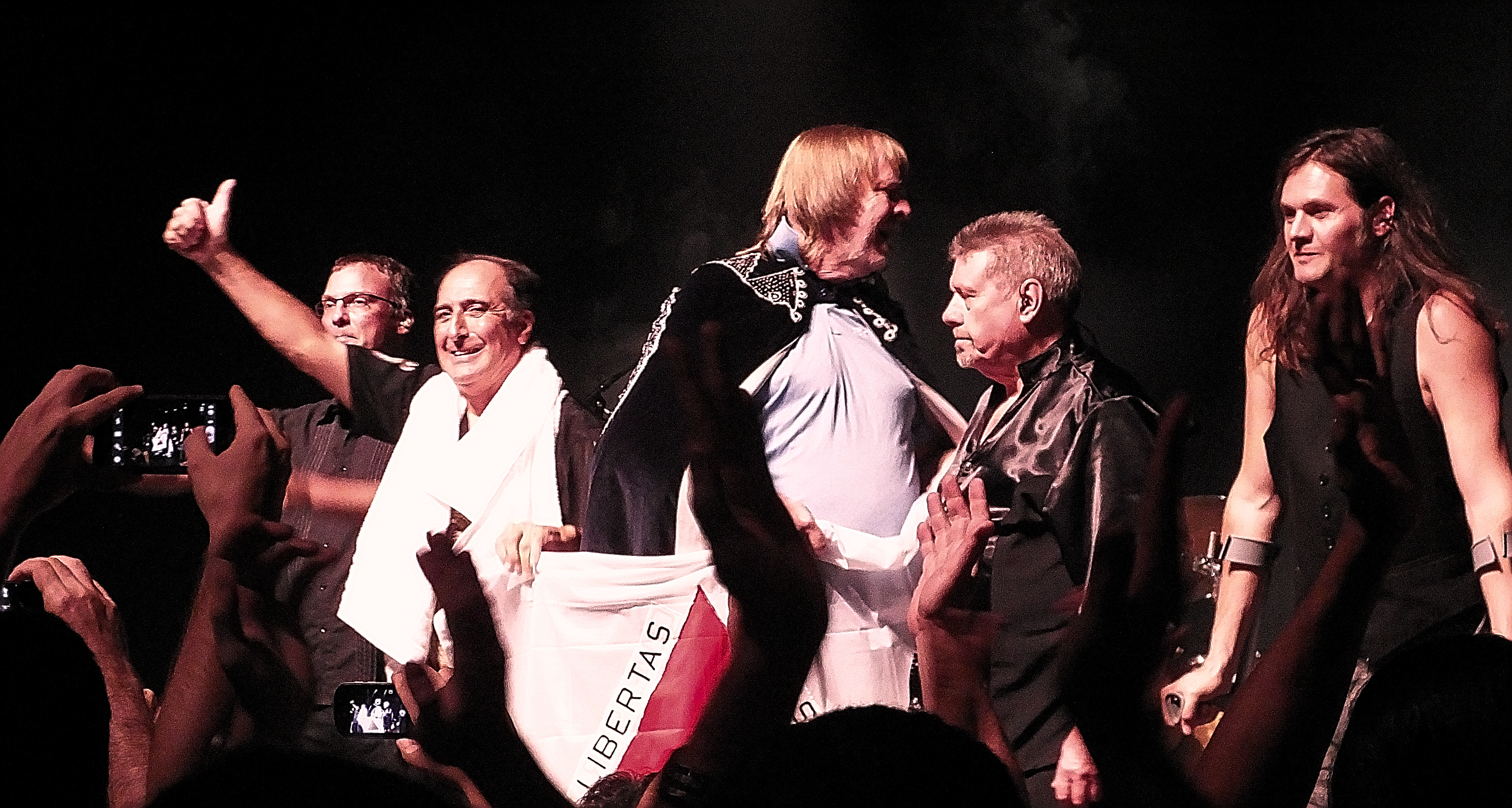
At Belo Horizonte (2014 tour)

After the album's original tour, the conductor's score was placed into storage by his management company, MAM Records. After the label folded in the early 1980s, he recalled that no one had knowledge of its location and declined offers from promoters to stage concerts as he thought a rewrite of the score would not live up to the quality of the original. However, in 2009, a box from Australia arrived at Wakeman's house which stayed in his garage for about five months before he looked through it, finding nothing that belonged to him except a copy of the original score which by then had suffered from water damage. In the course of a year, the score was digitised and pieced together with assistance from conductor and arranger Guy Protheroe which Wakeman used to make a new studio re-recording of Journey to the Centre of the Earth with 18 minutes of music that was cut from the original piece due to time constraints on a vinyl added in, making a new 54-minute piece. Recording took place from July to September 2012 with the Orion Orchestra, the English Chamber Choir, and his rock band, the English Rock Ensemble. As Hemmings died in 2003, the narration is voiced by actor Peter Egan. Released on 20 November 2012, the album was packaged with a one-off magazine published by Classic Rock and a replica of the 1974 Royal Festival Hall concert program and a 132-page booklet.

The live debut of the re-worked Journey took place with a South American tour in November 2012. This was followed by a UK tour in April and May 2014. In celebration of the album's 45th anniversary and Wakeman's 70th birthday, Wakeman performed the re-recorded version at the Royal Festival Hall on 13 and 14 July 2019. In February 2023, Wakeman performed two shows at the London Palladium, the second of which included a performance of Journey to the Centre of the Earth.

== Track listing ==
=== Original LP ===
All music is composed by Rick Wakeman except "The Forest", which includes an excerpt of "In the Hall of the Mountain King" by Edvard Grieg.

Side one
No.	Title	Length
1.	"The Journey"/"Recollection"	21:20

Side two
No.	Title	Length
1.	"The Battle"/"The Forest"	18:57

=== 2012 re-recording ===
No.	Title	Length
1.	"Preface to the Journey"	1:11
2.	"The Journey Overture"	2:25
3.	"Journey's Dawn"	3:38
4.	"Crystals"	0:33
5.	"The Gothic Cathedral"	1:07
6.	"A Quest for Water"	1:18
7.	"The Hansbach"	2:54
8.	"Fervent Prayer"	0:41
9.	"The Recollection"	2:32
10.	"Lost & Found"	0:43
11.	"Echoes"	3:49
12.	"4 Miles"	0:18
13.	"The Reunion"	2:40
14.	"A New Vista"	0:50
15.	"A World Within a World"	2:13
16.	"The Raft"	1:06
17.	"The Battle"	5:55
18.	"Cumulus Clouds"	0:38
19.	"The Storm"	2:01
20.	"The Cemetery"	1:28
21.	"Quaternary Man"	4:49
22.	"Mastodons"	0:55
23.	"The Forest"	2:30
24.	"Ages of Man"	1:55
25.	"The Tunnel"	1:53
26.	"Hall of the Mountain King"	0:52
27.	"Mount Etna"	3:12
Total length:		54:17

== Personnel ==
Credits adapted from the album's 1974 liner notes.

Musicians

- Rick Wakeman – 3 Mellotrons, 2 Minimoog synthesisers, 2 grand pianos, Hammond organ, Fender electric piano, RMI electric piano, Hohner Pianet, Honky-tonk piano
- Gary Pickford-Hopkins – vocals
- Ashley Holt – vocals
- Mike Egan – electric guitar
- Roger Newell – bass guitar
- Barney James – drums
- London Symphony Orchestra
- English Chamber Choir

Additional personnel

- David Measham – conductor
- David Hemmings – narrator

Production

- Lou Reizner – production co-ordination
- Danny Beckerman – orchestra and choir arrangements
- Will Malone – orchestra and choir arrangements
- Keith Grant – production engineer
- Paul Tregurtha – engineer at Morgan Studios
- Pete Flanagan – engineer at Morgan Studios
- Michael Doud – art direction
- Michael Wade – art design
- Chris Foster – photographer
- Paul Wakefield – photographer
- Peter Waldman – photographer
- Nigel Messett – photographer
- Ken Randall – photographer
- Mike Mann – photography retouching

== Charts ==
=== Weekly charts ===
Chart (1974)	Peak position
Australian Albums (Kent Music Report)	2
Canada Top Albums/CDs (RPM)	2
Finnish Albums (The Official Finnish Charts)	20
Italian Albums (Musica e Dischi)	18
New Zealand Albums (RMNZ)	17
UK Albums (Official Charts)	1
US Billboard 200	3

Chart (2016)	Peak position
UK Independent Albums (Official Charts)	13
UK Progressive Albums (Official Charts)	27
UK Rock & Metal Albums (Official Charts)	4

=== Year-end charts ===
Chart (1974)	Peak position
Australian Albums (Kent Music Report)	8
Canada Top Albums/CDs (RPM)	28
UK Albums (OCC)	16

== Certifications ==
Region	Certification	Certified units/sales
Australia (ARIA)	Gold	20,000^{^}
Brazil (Pro-Música Brasil)	Gold	200,000
Canada (Music Canada)	Gold	50,000^{^}
United Kingdom (BPI)	Gold	100,000^{^}
United States (RIAA)	Gold	500,000^{^}
^{^} Shipments figures based on certification alone.

== Accolades ==
Publication	Country	Accolade	Year	Rank
Prog	UK	The 100 Greatest Prog Albums of All Time	2014	55
