= The Myths and Legends of King Arthur and the Knights of the Round Table =

Studio album by Rick Wakeman
- Released: 27 March 1975
- Recorded: 16 October 1974 – 10 January 1975
- Studios: Morgan, London
- Genre: Progressive rock
- Length: 44:57
- Label: A&M
- Producer: Rick Wakeman

Rick Wakeman chronology
Journey to the Centre of the Earth (1974)	The Myths and Legends of King Arthur and the Knights of the Round Table (1975)	Lisztomania (1975)

2016 re-recording
- Roger Dean artwork

The Myths and Legends of King Arthur and the Knights of the Round Table is the third studio album and fourth overall by English keyboardist Rick Wakeman. Released on 27 March 1975 by A&M Records, it is a progressive rock concept album based on the stories and people of the King Arthur legend. It developed in the summer of 1974 while Wakeman was in hospital recovering from a heart attack, and started to write music for it on paper and a cassette recorder. Recording took place during his debut world tour promoting Journey to the Centre of the Earth (1974), and performed some of the album live in Japan, Australia, and New Zealand in early 1975 prior to its release. Wakeman performs with his five-piece band named the English Rock Ensemble, the New World Orchestra, and the English Chamber Choir conducted by David Measham.

King Arthur received positive reviews, though some labelled it a symbol of progressive rock excess. It reached No. 2 on the UK Albums Chart and No. 21 on the US Billboard 200. It was certified gold in the UK, Brazil, Japan, and Australia. The album was promoted with a world tour in 1975 that included three shows at Wembley Arena performed as an ice show, the last time it was performed in its entirety until 2016. The album was reissued in 2015 with a Quadrophonic mix, and re-recorded in 2016 with additional parts previously removed from the original score due to time constraints.

== Background ==
In July 1974, the 25-year-old Wakeman headlined the Garden Party VII concert at Crystal Palace Park in London, with his rock band, a symphony orchestra, and choir. He had left the progressive rock band Yes two months prior over differences surrounding their creative direction and continued with his solo career. He reached newfound success after his second album Journey to the Centre of the Earth (1974) had become the first from A&M Records to become a UK number one, which solidified him as virtuoso performer and composer. Despite the success, Wakeman's health deteriorated during the preparations for the Crystal Palace show. The stress of putting it together resulted in Wakeman going without sleep in the five days prior to the event, and he cracked some bones in his wrist after he fell over in a pub. Before he went on stage Wakeman received three injections, including one of morphine. Coupled with his frequent smoking and heavy drinking, the situation culminated several days later with Wakeman having three minor heart attacks.

During his recovery at Wexham Park Hospital in Berkshire, a specialist advised that Wakeman cease all performing and retire, but Wakeman ignored him and began to write songs for his next album that evening. He had stayed on a farm in Trevalga, Cornwall, near to the legendary site of Arthur's castle in Tintagel, for five months in his youth, an experience which had stuck with him ever since. This influenced his decision to make a concept album based on the legend of King Arthur and the people and stories based around him. The album was announced in the music press in August 1974, with the original intention to record in Belgium and performing it in Tintagel as part of a King Arthur Day festival on Easter Monday.

== Writing ==
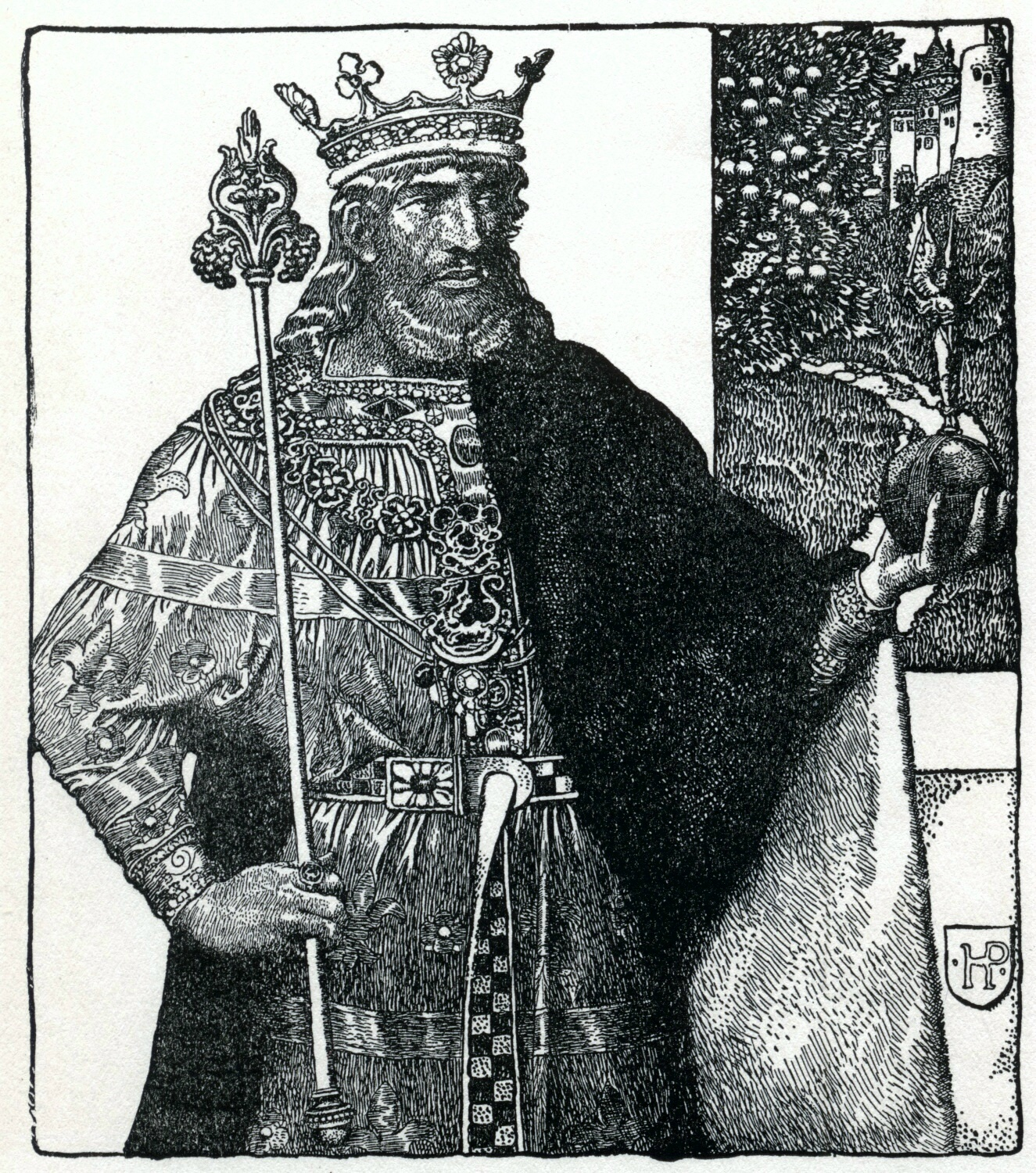
An illustration of Arthur from 1903 by Howard Pyle. Wakeman incorporated aspects from his own personal life into the album's lyrics: "It's as much about me as Arthur."

Wakeman kept track of his initial musical ideas by humming them into the microphone of a cassette tape recorder that someone he knew had brought into his ward. He had difficulty in writing songs at first as the eight books he read on the Arthurian legends gave different accounts, so he took four more well known stories and two lesser known that he found the most "colourful" to adapt music for, including some from children's books. He settled on four widely known stories and two lesser known, and proceeded to adapt them to music and lyrics. Much of the album is based around the three swords–the sword Arthur pulled out from the stone and anvil, the Excalibur which some believe was handed to Arthur by the Lady of the Lake, and the one associated to Galahad.

"The Last Battle" was the first track that Wakeman worked on in hospital, its title being a reference to his near-fatal condition. "Guinevere" was a song Wakeman had arranged six years prior to recording. "Sir Lancelot and the Black Knight" included violin arrangements from Wakeman that were so fast for the players, biographer Dan Wooding wrote they "collapsed with laughter" upon viewing the score. After some false starts, they played the music correctly after Wakeman instructed them they play twice as fast as he originally wanted. "I thought I'd teach the ones who were cocky a lesson". "Merlin the Magician" is in three parts; Wakeman had read several descriptions of the character and conjured the image of "a little old man preparing his potions", so he therefore introduces the song with a quiet theme. One book depicted Merlin working in the basement of a castle, "surrounded by bottles and liquids like a mad professor", which inspired the heavier second theme. The piano and banjo section arose from a story that involved Merlin falling in love and chasing after a young girl, who eventually shuts him in a cave where he dies.

Upon leaving hospital Wakeman retreated to his new home at Burnham Beeches in Buckinghamshire, and developed the themes he had written. Before recording the album, Wakeman completed his debut tour as a solo artist, a 22-date tour of the US and Canada which featured his band, an orchestra and choir performing Journey to the Centre of the Earth. The production ultimately cost him around £125,000. Shortly before the tour, Wakeman played a demo tape containing the main themes of King Arthur to music journalist Chris Welch, who described it as "a stately, inspired follow-up" to Journey.

== Recording ==
Upon returning to England, Wakeman and his band retreated to Morgan Studios in Willesden, London to record from 16 October 1974 to 10 January 1975. The airport baggage handlers had damaged several flight cases holding the band's equipment and needed repairs, causing a delay in the recording. Rehearsals lasted for around two-and-a-half weeks. The line-up of the group featured Gary Pickford-Hopkins and Ashley Holt on lead vocals, Jeffrey Crampton on guitars, Roger Newell on bass, Barney James on drums, and John Hodgson on percussion. They were joined by the 45-piece New World Orchestra, an ensemble formed by musicians picked by David Katz that included members of the London Symphony Orchestra, conductor David Measham, the 48-piece English Chamber Choir with choirmaster Guy Protheroe, and the 8-piece Nottingham Festival Vocal Group. An early idea for the album had engineer Paul Tregurtha inform Wakeman that what he wanted was "technically impossible", partly due to the lack of available tracks on the recording machine to produce his desired final mix.

== Release ==
The album was released on 27 March 1975. It reached a peak of No. 2 on the UK Albums Chart and reached Gold certification there and Brazil, Japan, and Australia. It was No. 1 in New Zealand and in the Top 10 in Finland and Norway. It failed to generate a similar commercial impact in the US, where it peaked at No. 21 on the Billboard 200.

In an exclusive preview of the album, Melody Maker reporter Chris Welch noted that the album was "bound to receive a roughing up at the hands of cynics", but if viewed as "entertainment designed to appeal to a wide audience" then it can be enjoyed in the same manner as a musical or film.

"Arthur" has been used by the BBC as the theme to its general election night coverage from 1979 to 1997, and 2005. The track returned with new instrumentation by the BBC News theme composer David Lowe for the 2019 and 2024 coverage.

For much of the mid-1980s into the 1990s, the final notes of "Arthur" has been the CBB and endcap sequence for programs produced and aired by TVRI in Indonesia.

== Tour ==
=== Wembley ice show ===
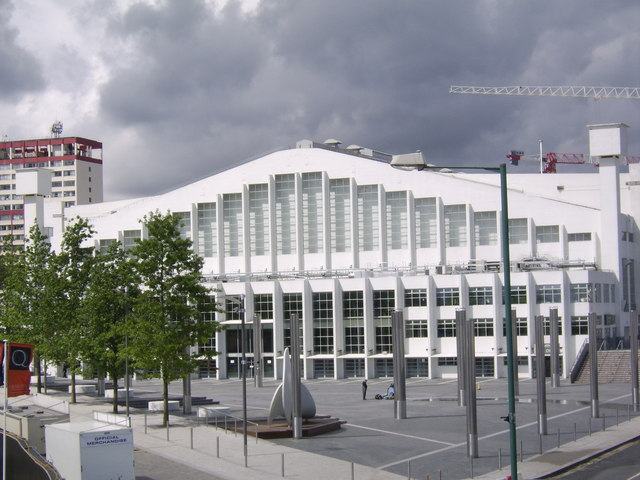
Wakeman supported the album with three sold out shows on ice at Wembley Arena

Wakeman wanted to perform the album as a unique show in England, which was to be his first UK concert since Crystal Palace. An early idea was to hold a King Arthur Day festival on Easter Monday at Tintagel Castle with a medieval pageant and jousting knights. Promoter Harvey Goldsmith travelled there to enquire, but the castle was unsuitable for a concert. Wakeman suggested a giant inflatable castle in nearby field, but Goldsmith found the land was crown property and several letters to the Duchy of Cornwall about the show failed to generate a response. Wakeman suggested Wembley Stadium, but Goldsmith explained it was not feasible. The keyboardist suggested the Empire Pool next door, but the Ice Follies were scheduled to perform and the arena floor had become an ice rink. Goldsmith and Wakeman's management instead suggested a scaled down show at the Royal Albert Hall, but Wakeman insisted on the Empire Pool, and subsequently told a Melody Maker reporter that he would be presenting King Arthur as an ice show with choreographed ice skaters, "so there was no going back". When it was announced that horses would be part of the show, animal welfare groups demanded it be cancelled. Wakeman responded with a press conference at the venue where skaters dressed as knights came out riding two-dimensional wooden horses.

Three sold out shows were held from 30 May–1 June that were attended by 27,000 people in total. Wakeman funded the production himself which included his band the English Rock Ensemble, an orchestra and choir playing in a makeshift castle in the centre of the ice rink, Terry Taplin as narrator, and 19 international ice skaters who re-enacted the scenes in costume. A suitable sound system could not be located in England, so a special one manufactured by Clair Brothers was transported from the US for the event. Though the shows sold out and raised publicity for the album, they ultimately lost money. The original plan was to hold three evening shows with a matinee on 31 May which would have helped bring the production to a small profit, but it was cancelled. One show was filmed and broadcast on television. The production was ranked No. 79 on the list of 100 Greatest Shocking Moments in Rock and Roll compiled by VH1. In 2014, Wakeman expressed a wish to stage King Arthur on ice once again at The O2 Arena.

Several problems and mishaps took place; when the actor playing a young Arthur pulled the sword from the stone, the anvil used to anchor the sword came out as well, since it had not itself been anchored. The actress playing Guinevere inadvertently skated over her veil, tearing her headgear out. The chainmail under Wakeman's cape accidentally caught on something as he was descending from his seat at one point, leaving him dangling over the ice. The dry ice fog, when used over real ice, created a mist that rose ever higher and thicker, to the point that the musicians not only could not see each other but had difficulty seeing their own instruments clearly enough. During "The Last Battle", plans called for six skaters dressed as knights to take to the ice and fight to their mutual "deaths". Well before the song was over, one knight appeared to have survived, to skate aimlessly around the ice. Wakeman saw him and realised that one of the skaters had called in sick that day and the production had failed to find a replacement. The skater solved the problem by pretending to throw himself on his sword and disappearing under the fog.

=== US, Canada, and Brazil ===
Wakeman supported the album with a concert tour of the United States, Canada, and Brazil between October and December 1975. The latter leg saw Wakeman perform with the Brazilian Symphony Orchestra in shows organised by the Brazilian government and attended by what Wooding estimated as around 500,000 in total. During his stop in Rio de Janeiro, Wakeman met Ronnie Biggs, one of the participants of the 1963 Great Train Robbery, who received tickets to the show and gave Wakeman the shirt he wore during the robbery. The tour marked a new line-up of Wakeman's band the English Rock Ensemble, featuring vocalist Ashley Holt, bassist Roger Newell, and newcomers guitarist John Dunsterville, drummer Tony Fernandez, trombonist Reg Brooks, and trumpeter Martin Shields.

== Rerecording ==
In 2012, Wakeman released a rerecorded version of Journey to the Centre of the Earth with additional pieces that were originally removed from the arrangement due to the limited time available on a vinyl record. He was booked to perform the extended album in Argentina that year, but the promoter also wished for a show with an extended version of King Arthur. Wakeman proceeded to work on new songs for the special occasion that were based on Morgan le Fay, Elaine, Camelot, Percival, and the Holy Grail. However, the promoter later asked for The Six Wives of Henry VIII instead and the new material remained unfinished. The idea resurfaced in 2015 when Stuart Galbraith, promoter of Wakeman's 2014 Journey tour, suggested a similar re-recording for King Arthur and to have it performed at The O2 Arena as part of the 2016 Stone Free Festival. Wakeman accepted, and the concert became a catalyst for a new, 88-minute version to be arranged and recorded in time for it.

The project was Wakeman's first to be completed through online direct-to-fan support, as suggested by Steve Hammonds of Universal Records. Wakeman had approached the label about the original album put out with the new songs added in, yet Hammonds wanted everything to be re-recorded and noted the label was too short on time to have it put down and placed it in their release schedule. Knowing the project would become expensive, Hammonds advised Wakeman to set up a fund on PledgeMusic to allow fans to donate towards its cost. The 90-day fund launched on 9 February 2016 with donation incentives to receive exclusive merchandise, deluxe album packages, attend recording sessions, and receive an executive producer credit. Wakeman was pleased with the pledge system and felt encouraged to deliver a good product from reading fan comments and messages. The fund ended with 140% of its target met and 2,891 individual pledgers.

The re-recording was produced at Angel Recording Studios in northern London with the English Chamber Choir, Wakeman's English Rock Ensemble, conductor Guy Protheroe, and Ann Manly assisting Protheroe with the orchestral scores. Narration was provided by actor Ian Lavender. Wakeman was often asked whether "Merlin the Magician" was to be kept an instrumental track; he decided to incorporate a version with lyrics. Sections of the horn arrangements were recorded many times to acquire the best sound and cut. The piano parts were recorded in several days at The Old Granary in Norfolk which has a Steinway grand piano, Wakeman's favourite model of the instrument. Roger Dean was commissioned to design its new artwork. It was released on 19 June 2016 by PledgeMusic/Gonzo Entertainment, the day of the O2 Arena concert.

== Track listing ==
All tracks and lyrics by Rick Wakeman.

Side one
No.	Title	Length
1.	"Arthur"	7:26
2.	"Lady of the Lake"	0:45
3.	"Guinevere"	6:45
4.	"Sir Lancelot and the Black Knight"	5:20

Side two
No.	Title	Length
1.	"Merlin the Magician"	8:51
2.	"Sir Galahad"	5:51
3.	"The Last Battle"	9:41

=== 2016 recording ===
In bold are the tracks from the original recording.

Disc one
No.	Title	Length
1.	"The Choice of King"	0:10
2.	"**King Arthur**"	7:30
3.	"Morgan le Fay"	7:19
4.	"**Lady of the Lake**"	0:47
5.	"Arthur's Queen"	0:36
6.	"**Guinevere**"	6:34
7.	"**Lancelot and The Black Knight**"	5:54
8.	"Princess Elaine"	6:39
9.	"Camelot"	5:50

Disc two
No.	Title	Length
10.	"The King of Merlins"	0:43
11.	"A Wizards Potion"	0:35
12.	"**Merlin the Magician**"	7:38
13.	"The Chalice"	0:48
14.	"The Holy Grail"	6:05
15.	"The Best Knight"	0:42
16.	"The Contest"	0:33
17.	"**Sir Galahad**"	5:12
18.	"Percival the Knight"	9:30
19.	"Excalibur"	0:30
20.	"**The Last Battle**"	9:51

== Personnel ==
Credits are adapted from the album's liner notes.

**Musicians**

- Rick Wakeman – synthesisers, keyboards, grand piano
- Gary Pickford-Hopkins – lead vocals
- Ashley Holt – lead vocals
- Geoffrey Crampton – lead and acoustic guitars
- Roger Newell – bass guitar
- Barney James – drums
- John Hodgson – percussion
- New World Orchestra
- David Measham – orchestra and choir conductor
- English Chamber Choir
- Guy Protheroe – choirmaster
- Terry Taplin - Narration

**Production**

- Rick Wakeman – production
- Paul Tregurtha – engineer
- Jeremy Stenham – assistant engineer
- David Katz – orchestral co-ordination
- Wil Malone – orchestral arrangements
- Fabio Nicoli – art direction
- Paul May – art direction, design
- Bob Elsdale – photography
- Bob Fowke – illustrations
- Dave Bowyer – illustrations
- Mansell Collection – engravings

=== 2016 re-recording ===
Credits are adapted from the liner notes.

**The English Rock Ensemble**

- Rick Wakeman – piano, keyboards, choir arrangement (new pieces)
- Ashley Holt – vocals
- Hayley Sanderson – vocals
- Tony Fernandez – drums, percussion
- Matt Pegg – bass guitar
- Dave Colquhoun – guitars, banjo

**Additional personnel**

- Ian Lavender – narration
- Orion Orchestra
- English Chamber Choir
- Nottingham Festival Male Voice Choir
  - John Parry – bass
  - Bob Hunter – bass
  - Freddie Williams – tenor
  - Eric Gethin – high tenor
  - Val Williams – baritone
  - Allan Grant – baritone
  - Carey Wilson – tenor
  - Michael Pearn – tenor
- Guy Protheroe – orchestral adaptation (1975 pieces), orchestral arrangement (new pieces)
- Ann Manly – orchestral adaptation (1975 pieces), orchestral arrangement (new pieces)
- Wil Malone – choir arrangement (1975 pieces)
- Roger Dean – painting, sketches, cover lettering

== Charts ==
=== Weekly charts ===
Chart (1975)	Peak position
Australian Albums (Kent Music Report)	2
Canada Top Albums/CDs (RPM)	18
Finnish Albums (The Official Finnish Charts)	4
New Zealand Albums (RMNZ)	1
Norwegian Albums (VG-lista)	6
UK Albums (Official Charts)	2
US Billboard 200	21

=== Year-end charts ===
Chart (1975)	Peak position
Australian Albums (Kent Music Report)	18
UK Albums (OCC)	35

== Certifications ==
Region	Certification	Certified units/sales
Australia (ARIA)	Gold	20,000^{^}
Brazil (Pro-Música Brasil)	Gold	100,000^{*}
Japan (RIAJ)	Gold	100,000^{^}
United Kingdom (BPI)	Gold	100,000^{^}
^{*} Sales figures based on certification alone.^{^} Shipments figures based on certification alone.

== Bibliography ==
- Kirkman, Jon (2019). Dialogue: The Yes Interviews, Volume 2. Classic Rock Vaults Books. ISBN 978-1-789-72396-0.
- Wooding, Dan (1978). Rick Wakeman: The Caped Crusader. Robert Hale Ltd. ISBN 978-0-709-16487-6.
