= Aaron Lowe =

Canadian ice dancer

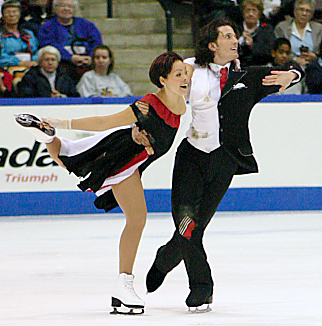

Personal information
- Born: October 12, 1974 (age 51) Vancouver, British Columbia, Canada
- Height: 1.78 m (5 ft 10 in)

Figure skating career
- Country: Canada
- Partner: Megan Wing
- Skating club: Sunset FSC Vancouver
- Retired: April 25, 2006
Medal record
Figure skating
Ice dancing
Representing Canada
Four Continents Championships
Bronze medal – third place	2004 Hamilton	Ice dancing
Bronze medal – third place	2002 Jeonju	Ice dancing

Aaron Lowe (born October 12, 1974) is a retired Canadian ice dancer and current coach. With former partner and wife Megan Wing, he is a two-time Four Continents bronze medalist.

== Career ==
Lowe was born in Vancouver, British Columbia. He began in hockey at the age of seven and switched to figure skating when he was nine. He began skating with Megan Wing in 1986. They won six bronze medals and four silver medals at the Canadian Figure Skating Championships. In 2006, the duo competed in the Winter Olympics, where they finished 11th overall. On April 25, 2006, Wing and Lowe announced officially their retirement from competitive skating.

Aaron now competes in Functional Fitness. On April 20, 2024, he won the Festivus Games at Hybrid Athletics.

Wing and Lowe coach in British Columbia. Their students include:

- Miku Makita / Tyler Gunara

== Personal life ==
Wing / Lowe's twins, a daughter and son named Keauna Auburn Wing Lowe and Tayson Pierce Wing Lowe, were born on October 6, 2011.

== Programs ==
Season	Original dance	Free dance
2005–2006	Gozon by Tito Puente; Ya Lo Se Que Te Vos by Juan Gabriel; Living La Vida Loca by Ricky Martin	Prologue (Tango Apasioado) by Astor Piazzolla; Desde el Almy by Osvaldo Pugliese; Milonga for Three; Bialongo by Astor Piazzolla
2004–2005	Just in Time by Bobby Darin; That's a Plenty by Lew Pollack	Zorba the Greek by John Murphy and David Hughes; Zorba by Mikis Theodorakis
2003–2004	Jumpin at the Green Mill; Grinnin' Like a Chessy Cat performed by The Mighty Blue Kings; Jumpin East of Java by the Brian Setzer Orchestra	La Strada; I clowns; Amarcord; Il bidone; 8½ by Nino Rota
2002–2003	Waltz: Rosen aus dem Süden, op. 388 (Roses from the South); Polka: Unter Donner und Blitz, op. 324 (Amidst Thunder and Lightning) by Johann Strauss II	John Lennon: Starting Over; I'm Losing You; Dear Yoko; Imagine
2001–2002	Fiesta Flamenco performed by Monty Kelly; Verano Porteno by Raul Garello	Supreme Beings of Leisure: Last Girl on Earth; Truth From Fiction; You're Always the Sun; Strangelove Addiction
2000–2001	Chicago (musical) by Chita Rodriguez: Overture; All that Jazz	Ameno; Mirror by Era

== Competitive highlights ==
GP: ISU Champions Series / Grand Prix

with Wing

=== 1995–1996 to 2005–2006 ===
International
Event	95–96	96–97	97–98	98–99	99–00	00–01	01–02	02–03	03–04	04–05	05–06
Olympics											11th
Worlds					15th			12th	11th	10th	10th
Four Continents				4th	4th	4th	3rd	5th	3rd		
GP Cup of China											3rd
GP Cup of Russia		10th						6th			
GP Lalique		10th	9th		8th	7th					
GP NHK Trophy				6th				6th	5th		
GP Skate America		8th	7th				6th			3rd	4th
GP Skate Canada	10th			9th	5th	5th	6th		5th	5th	
Bofrost Cup										4th	
Nebelhorn	4th										
St. Gervais	2nd										
National
Canadian Champ.	4th	3rd	3rd	3rd	2nd	3rd	3rd	3rd	2nd	2nd	2nd

=== 1989–1990 to 1994–1995 ===
National
Event	89–90	90–91	91–92	92–93	93–94	94–95
Canadian Champ.	9th N	4th N	11th J	7th J	3rd J	6th
Canada Winter Games		4th N				
Levels: N = Novice; J = Junior
