= Shakin' Street =

Shakin' Street may refer to:

- "Shakin' Street", a song by MC5 from their 1970 album Back in the USA
- Shakin' Street, a French rock band founded by Eric Lévi and Fabienne Shine
