= Reborn (Era album) =

Studio album by Era
- Released: 24 March 2008
- Genre: New-age
- Label: Mercury

Era chronology
The Very Best (2004)	Reborn (2008)	Classics (2009)

Reborn is the fourth studio album by Eric Lévi's new-age project Era, released on March 24, 2008.

Videos were shot for "Reborn" and "Prayers".

== Track listing ==
1. "Reborn" – 5:32
2. "Prayers" – 4:20
3. "Dark Voices" – 5:01
4. "Sinfoni Deo" – 4:41
5. "Come into My World" – 5:19
6. "Kilimandjaro" – 4:35
7. "Thousand Words" – 5:21
8. "After Thousand words" – 4:59
9. "Last Song" – 4:50
10. "Come into My world" (Remix) – 9:15

== Chart positions ==
=== Weekly ===
Chart (2008–2010)	Peak position
Belgian Albums (Ultratop Wallonia)	10
French Albums (SNEP)	6
Mexican Albums (Top 100 Mexico)	96
Swiss Albums (Schweizer Hitparade)	18

=== Year-end ===
Chart (2008)	Position
Belgian Albums (Ultratop Wallonia)	71

== Certifications ==
Region	Certification	Certified units/sales
Russia (NFPF)	Gold	10,000^{*}
^{*} Sales figures based on certification alone.
