= Goya Menor =

Nigerian musician (born 1995)

- Born: Bright Goya; 4 May 1995 (age 31); Edo State, Nigeria
- Origin: Edo State, Nigeria
- Genres: Afrobeats; Amapiano
- Occupations: Singer; Songwriter
- Years active: 2020–present

Bright Goya (born 4 May 1995) known professionally as Goya Menor, is a Nigerian singer-songwriter. He is best known for his breakout remix for "Ameno" featuring Nektunez, which reached number one in over 10 countries including his home country Nigeria.

== Early life and education ==
Goya Menor is from Edo State, Nigeria. He studied sociology at Ambrose Alli University in Ekpoma, Edo State. Additionally, he holds an honorary doctorate in business management from the American Management University.

== Career ==
Menor gained mainstream attention with his breakout remix, "Ameno" featuring Nektunez, which reached number one in over 10 countries including his home country Nigeria. Shaq O'Neal, Paul Pogba and other celebrities took part in Ameno's dance challenge, his manager Joseph Oche Udeh played a role in Ameno's remix success. Ameno remix was later remixed by David Guetta. In 2022, Menor, alongside Nektunez, won the award for Best Street-Hop Artiste in the 15th Headies Award.

== Discography ==
- Bomboy - EP (2024)
- "Don Dada (Boss)" (2023)
- "Wahala No Dey" - (2024)
- "Grace" ft. Ladé - (2022)
- "Para" - (2024)
