= The Mass (album) =

Studio album by Era
- Released: 26 February 2003
- Recorded: 2002
- Genre: New-age
- Label: Mercury Records; Universal Music

Era chronology
Era 2 (2000)	The Mass (2003)	The Very Best of Era (2004)

The Mass is the third studio album by Eric Lévi's musical project Era. Released on February 26, 2003. It achieved success in several European countries. The title track, "The Mass", is an adaptation of O Fortuna, a classical piece by Carl Orff.

Videos were shot for "The Mass" and "Looking for Something" on location at Chateau de Commarque, France; featuring actors Pierre Boisserie and Irene Bustamante.

== Track listings ==
No.	Title	Length
1.	"The Mass" (Guy Protheroe, vocals)	3:39
2.	"Looking for Something" (Lena Jinnegren, vocals)	4:09
3.	"Don't Go Away" (Lena Jinnegren, vocals)	4:23
4.	"Don't You Forget" (Lena Jinnegren, vocals)	3:40
5.	"If You Shout" (Lena Jinnegren, vocals)	3:49
6.	"Avemano Orchestral" (Harriet Jay, vocals)	4:20
7.	"Enae Volare" (Guy Protheroe, vocals)	3:34
8.	"Sombre Day"	3:42
9.	"Voxifera"	4:20
10.	"The Champions"	3:28

== Charts ==
=== Weekly charts ===
Chart (2003–2005)	Peak position
Austrian Albums (Ö3 Austria)	17
Belgian Albums (Ultratop Flanders)	43
Belgian Albums (Ultratop Wallonia)	5
Dutch Albums (Album Top 100)	10
French Albums (SNEP)	4
German Albums (Offizielle Top 100)	53
Hungarian Albums (MAHASZ)	13
Italian Albums (FIMI)	1
Portuguese Albums (AFP)	9
Swedish Albums (Sverigetopplistan)	10
Swiss Albums (Schweizer Hitparade)	2

=== Year-end charts ===
Chart (2003)	Position
Belgian Albums (Ultratop Wallonia)	19
Dutch Albums (Album Top 100)	100
French Albums (SNEP)	17
Swiss Albums (Schweizer Hitparade)	39

Chart (2004)	Position
French Albums (SNEP)	197

== Certifications ==
Region	Certification	Certified units/sales
France (SNEP)	Platinum	300,000^{*}
Switzerland (IFPI Switzerland)	Platinum	40,000^{^}
^{*} Sales figures based on certification alone.^{^} Shipments figures based on certification alone.
