= Believe (Katherine Jenkins album) =

Studio album by Katherine Jenkins
- Released: 26 October 2009; 29 March 2010 (deluxe edition); 6 December 2010 (platinum edition)
- Recorded: 2009 Los Angeles
- Genres: Classical Crossover, soft rock
- Label: Warner Bros.
- Producer: David Foster

Katherine Jenkins chronology
Sacred Arias (2008)	Believe (2009)	The Ultimate Collection (2009)

Singles from Believe
- 1. "I Believe" Released: 24 September 2009; 2. "Bring Me To Life" Released: 23 October 2009; 3. "Parla Più Piano (Love Theme from the Godfather)" Released: 25 November 2009; 4. "Angel" Released: 14 December 2009; 5. "Fear of Falling" Released: 12 April 2010; 6. "Endless Love" Released: 24 May 2010; 7. "Tell Me I'm Not Dreaming" Released: 29 November 2010

Alternative cover
- Believe – Platinum edition cover

Professional ratings
Review scores
Source	Rating
euVue	7/10 stars
The Citizen	5.5/10 stars
Jeremy Gates	5/10 stars
Gold 90.5FM	3/5 stars
Allmusic	3.5/5 stars
Classical-Crossover.co.uk	4/5 stars

Believe is the seventh studio album by classical crossover artist Katherine Jenkins and was released on 26 October 2009 in the UK.

Jenkins described this album as her most accessible to date, with many more popular songs, such as Evanescence's "Bring Me to Life".

== Track listing ==
=== International edition ===
No.	Title	Writer(s)	Length
1.	"Till There Was You" (from The Music Man, 1957)	Meredith Willson	3:33
2.	"Bring Me to Life"	Amy Lee, David Hodges, Ben Moody	3:46
3.	"Angel"	Sarah McLachlan	5:54
4.	"I Believe" (duet with Andrea Bocelli)	Éric Levi	4:25
5.	"Fear of Falling"	Richard Marx	3:58
6.	"Parla Più Piano – Love Theme From The Godfather"	Nino Rota	4:18
7.	"Ancora Non Sai" (with violinist André Rieu)	David Foster	4:58
8.	"No Woman, No Cry" (duet with Cody Carey)	Vincent Ford	4:54
9.	"La Vie En Rose"	Édith Piaf, Louis Guglielmi	3:22
10.	"La Califfa" (with trumpeter Chris Botti)	Ennio Morricone	3:30
11.	"Who Wants to Live Forever"	Brian May	4:07
12.	"Se Si Perde Un Amore"	Marco Marinangeli	4:46

Diamond Edition / Australian Edition / Japanese Edition / Barnes & Noble Exclusive Edition bonus track
No.	Title	Writer(s)	Length
13.	"Adagio"	Remo Giazotto	3:41

iTunes bonus track
No.	Title	Length
13.	"Believe (Track by Track)" (Video)	12:15

See also Deluxe edition and Platinum edition for track listings on the international released version of Believe.

=== U.S. edition ===
No.	Title	Writer(s)	Length
1.	"Till There Was You" (from The Music Man, 1957)	Meredith Willson	3:33
2.	"Bring Me to Life"	Amy Lee, David Hodges, Ben Moody	3:46
3.	"Angel"	Sarah McLachlan	5:54
4.	"I Believe" (duet with Andrea Bocelli)	Éric Levi	4:25
5.	"Love Never Dies" (from Love Never Dies, 2010)	Andrew Lloyd Webber, Glenn Slater	4:33
6.	"Fear of Falling"	Richard Marx	3:58
7.	"Parla Più Piano – Love Theme From The Godfather"	Nino Rota	4:18
8.	"Ancora Non Sai" (with violinist André Rieu)	David Foster	4:58
9.	"Se Si Perde Un Amore"	Marco Marinangeli	4:46
10.	"La Vie En Rose"	Édith Piaf, Louis Guglielmi	3:22
11.	"La Califfa" (with trumpeter Chris Botti)	Ennio Morricone	3:30
12.	"Who Wants to Live Forever"	Brian May	4:07

Deluxe Digital bonus tracks
No.	Title	Writer(s)	Length
13.	"No Woman, No Cry" (duet with Cody Carey)	Vincent Ford	4:54
14.	"Angel (Radio Edit)"	Sarah McLachlan	3:05

Special Edition bonus track
No.	Title	Writer(s)	Length
13.	"Adagio"	Remo Giazotto	3:41

== Deluxe edition ==
The deluxe edition of the album, released on 29 March 2010 in the UK, includes two new tracks: "Love Never Dies" and "Endless Love", with a total of 13 tracks. The track "Se Si Perde Un Amore" from the standard edition is not included.

No.	Title	Writer(s)	Length
1.	"Love Never Dies" (from Love Never Dies, 2010)	Andrew Lloyd Webber, Glenn Slater	4:33
2.	"Bring Me to Life"	Amy Lee, David Hodges, Ben Moody	3:46
3.	"Angel"	Sarah McLachlan	5:54
4.	"I Believe" (duet with Andrea Bocelli)	Éric Levi	4:25
5.	"Who Wants to Live Forever"	Brian May	4:07
6.	"Parla Più Piano – Love Theme From The Godfather"	Nino Rota	4:18
7.	"Endless Love" (duet with Amaury Vassili)	Lionel Richie	4:24
8.	"Till There Was You"	Meredith Willson	3:33
9.	"La Vie En Rose"	Édith Piaf, Louis Guglielmi	3:22
10.	"La Califfa" (with trumpeter Chris Botti)	Ennio Morricone	3:30
11.	"No Woman, No Cry" (duet with Cody Karey)	Vincent Ford	4:54
12.	"Fear of Falling"	Richard Marx	3:58
13.	"Ancora Non Sai" (with violinist André Rieu)	David Foster	4:58

Japanese Edition bonus tracks
No.	Title	Writer(s)	Length
14.	"Se Si Perde Un Amore"	Marco Marinangeli	4:46
15.	"Adagio"	Remo Giazotto	3:41

iTunes bonus track
No.	Title	Writer(s)	Length
14.	"Se Si Perde Un Amore"	Marco Marinangeli	4:46

=== Platinum edition ===
The Platinum edition of the album, released on 6 December 2010 in the UK, includes four new tracks ("Tell Me I'm Not Dreaming", "Gravity", "In The Bleak Midwinter", and a live version of "O Holy Night" with Michael Bolton), plus a DVD film documentary including all promo videos from the Believe campaign ("Bring Me To Life", "Angel", "Love Never Dies"), two full live tracks from her London O2 show, international TV appearances and video diaries from her Argentina promo tour.

Platinum edition
No.	Title	Writer(s)	Length
1.	"Tell Me I'm Not Dreaming"	David Hodges, Steve McEwan	3:47
2.	"Till There Was You"	Meredith Willson	3:33
3.	"Love Never Dies"	Andrew Lloyd Webber, Glenn Slater	4:33
4.	"Bring Me to Life"	Amy Lee, David Hodges, Ben Moody	3:46
5.	"Angel"	Sarah McLachlan	5:54
6.	"I Believe" (duet with Andrea Bocelli)	Éric Levi	4:25
7.	"Gravity"	Guy Berryman, Chris Martin, Jonny Buckland, Will Champion	5:45
8.	"Fear of Falling"	Richard Marx	3:58
9.	"Who Wants to Live Forever"	Brian May	4:07
10.	"In the Bleak Midwinter"	Christina Rossetti, Gustav Holst	4:48
11.	"Parla Più Piano – Love Theme From The Godfather"	Nino Rota	4:18
12.	"Endless Love" (duet with Amaury Vassili)	Lionel Richie	4:24
13.	"Ancora Non Sai" (with violinist André Rieu)	David Foster	4:58
14.	"La Vie En Rose"	Édith Piaf, Louis Guglielmi	3:22
15.	"La Califfa" (with trumpeter Chris Botti)	Ennio Morricone	3:30
16.	"Se Si Perde Un Amore"	Marco Marinangeli	4:46
17.	"Adagio"	Remo Giazotto	3:41
18.	"O Holy Night" (duet with Michael Bolton) (Live)	Adolphe Adam, John Sullivan Dwight	5:37

Bonus DVD
No.	Title	Length
1.	"A Year of Believe"	58:00

iTunes bonus tracks
No.	Title	Writer(s)	Length
19.	"Fear of Falling (iTunes Live from London)"	Richard Marx	3:42
20.	"Parla Più Piano – Love Theme From The Godfather (iTunes Live from London)"	Nino Rota	3:58
21.	"Angel (iTunes Live from London)"	Sarah McLachlan	5:24
22.	"Till There Was You (iTunes Live from London)"	Meredith Willson	3:03
23.	"La Vie En Rose (iTunes Live from London)"	Édith Piaf, Louis Guglielmi	2:29
24.	"I Believe (iTunes Live from London)"	Éric Levi	3:58

== Remixes ==
Almighty Records remixed two tracks from the album as promos: "Bring Me to Life" and "Who Wants to Live Forever". Katherine Jenkins performed the Almighty remix versions of these tracks at the London nightclub Heaven for their G-A-Y night on 24 October 2009. Jenkins is the first classical singer to headline at G-A-Y night.

Bring Me to Life

- Released: 23 October 2009
- Label: Warner
1. Almighty Remix (Club Mix) – 7:05
2. Almighty Remix (Radio Edit) – 3:10
3. Original – 3:46

Who Wants To Live Forever

- Released: 2009
- Label: Warner
1. Almighty Radio Edit – 4:11
2. Almighty Club Mix – 7:17
3. Almighty Dub Remix – 7:18
4. Almighty Instrumental – 7:18
5. Original Mix – 4:07

== Charts ==
Year	Chart	Peak Position
2009	UK Top 40 Albums Chart	6
2009	Irish Top 75 Albums Chart	13
2009	Australian Charts – Top 50 Albums	44
2010	Australian Charts – Top 50 Albums	35
2010	Belgian (Flanders) Top 100 Albums Chart	13
2010	Belgian (Wallonia) Top 100 Albums Chart	9
2010	Greek Top 50 Albums Chart	13
2010	German Top 50 Albums Chart	10
2010	Swiss Top 100 Albums Chart	35
2010	Austrian Top 75 Albums Chart	18
2010	Dutch Top 100 Albums Chart	39
2010	French Top 200 Albums Chart	55
2010	U.S. Billboard Classical Albums Chart	5
2010	U.S. Billboard Heatseekers Albums Chart	42

=== Year-end charts ===
Chart (2009)	Rank
Australian ARIA Charts – Top 50 Classical Albums	10
Chart (2010)	Rank
Australian ARIA Charts – Top 50 Classical Albums	7
German Albums Chart	100
Belgian (Wallonia) Albums Chart	88

== Certifications ==
Region	Certification	Certified units/sales
Argentina (CAPIF)	Gold	20,000^{^}
Ireland (IRMA)	Platinum	15,000^{^}
United Kingdom (BPI)	Platinum	300,000^{*}
^{*} Sales figures based on certification alone.^{^} Shipments figures based on certification alone.

== Personnel ==
- Katherine Jenkins – vocals (tracks 1, 4, 6–7, 9–10, 12, lead on 2–3, 5, 8, 11)
- David Foster – musical arrangement (tracks 1–7, 9–12), orchestral arrangement (1–6, 9–11), keyboards (1–7, 9–11), piano (12)
- Bill Ross - musical arrangement (tracks 7, 12), orchestral arrangement (1–6, 9–11), string arrangement (8)
- Armin Steiner - orchestra recording engineer (tracks 1–6, 9–11)
- Gina Zimmitti - orchestra contractor (tracks 1–6, 9–11)
- Larry Mah - Pro-Tools recording engineer (tracks 1–4, 6–12)
- Brett Parker - assistant recording engineer (tracks 1–4, 6–12)
- Jorge Vivo - additional recording engineer (tracks 1–4, 6–12)
- Dean Parks – guitar (tracks 2–3, 8)
- Angela Fisher - choir contractor (tracks 2–3, 8, 11), choir director (2–3, 8, 11)
- David Reitzas - choir recording engineer (tracks 2–3, 8, 11)
- Courtney Blooding – production coordinator (All tracks), background vocals (track 2)
- Jochem van der Saag - sound designer (All tracks), drum machine (All tracks), musical arrangement (track 8), synthesizer (2, 11), keyboards (8), background vocals (8), recording engineer (5), audio mixing (5)
- Gayle Levant – harp (track 3)
- Andrea Bocelli – flute (track 4), vocals (4)
- Richard Marx - background vocals (track 5)
- Michael Thompson – guitar (tracks 5, 11)
- Vanessa Freebairn-Smith – cello (track 6)
- André Rieu - violin (track 7)
- Cody Carey – lead vocals (track 8)
- Chris Botti – trumpet (track 10)
