= Cappella Romana =

American vocal ensemble

Cappella Romana is a vocal ensemble founded in 1991 in Portland, Oregon. Its name, meaning "Roman Chapel", refers to the medieval Greek concept of the Roman oikoumene (inhabited world), which embraced Rome and Western Europe, as well as the Byzantine Empire of Constantinople ("New Rome") and its Slavic commonwealth centered at Moscow. It has become especially known for its exploration of Eastern Orthodox vocal music. It has collaborated with notable museum exhibitions at the Metropolitan Museum of Art in New York and the J. Paul Getty Museum in Los Angeles. The ensemble's 2002 performance of Ivan Moody's Passion and Resurrection was acclaimed by Los Angeles Times music critic Chris Pasles as "sung gorgeously" and "like jeweled light flooding the space".

In 2010 it became a participant in the research project 'Icons of Sound: Aesthetics and Acoustics of Hagia Sophia, Istanbul', a collaboration between Stanford University's Center for Computer Research in Music and Acoustics (CCRMA) and Department of Art & Art History. Cappella Romana completed a residency at Stanford again in 2013, which included further experiments with CCRMA, lecture demonstrations, and a live performance in Stanford's new Bing Hall, featuring a medieval Byzantine chant sung in the virtual acoustic of Hagia Sophia before a sold-out audience.

For their 2019 album of music in the medieval Byzantine tradition, Lost Voices of Hagia Sophia, advanced digital sound-sampling techniques were employed to capture the acoustics of the immense Hagia Sophia. The ensemble's singing of Byzantine chants thus recreates the ambiance as the music would have been heard there a millennium ago. The New York Times said the album "... brings to life the stately mystery of Byzantine cathedral liturgy, bathed in the glittering acoustics of the space for which it was written — even though it was recorded in a studio in California".

The ensemble is directed by Alexander Lingas, a musicologist of Byzantine music at City University, London. Guest artists with similar interests regularly appear with the ensemble, including Ioannis Arvanitis, Stelios Kontakiotis, Ivan Moody, and Vladimir Morosan.

Passion Week, Maximilian Steinberg's 1923 choral work based on Russian Orthodox liturgical texts for Holy Week in Old Church Slavonic, was given its world premiere in 2014 by Cappella Romana in Portland, Oregon. In preparation for the premiere, Cappella Romana's music director, Alexander Lingas, had traveled to St. Petersburg in order to examine Steinberg's manuscripts. His research resulted in a new edition of the previously lost work, published by Musica Russica. This edition was also used for the first ever recording of the work by Cappella Romana and in performances of the work by other choirs throughout the world.

== Discography ==
- 2019 — Lost Voices of Hagia Sophia
- 2015 — Cyprus. Between Greek East and Latin West
- 2012 — Angelic Light: Music from Eastern Cathedrals (Valley Entertainment)
- 2011 — Mt. Sinai: Frontier of Byzantium
- 2011 — Choral Settings of Kassiani
- 2009 — Peter Michaelides: The Divine Liturgy
- 2009 — Byzantium in Rome: Medieval Byzantine Chant from Grottaferrata
- 2009 — Byzantium: 330-1453 (Royal Academy of Arts)
- 2008 — Kontakion on the Nativity of Christ
- 2008 — The Divine Liturgy in English in Byzantine Chant
- 2006 — The Fall of Constantinople
- 2005 — Epiphany: Medieval Byzantine Chant
- 2005 — Lay Aside All Earthly Cares: Orthodox Choral Works in English
- 2004 — Music of Byzantium (Metropolitan Museum of Art)
- 2003 — The Akáthistos Hymn by Ivan Moody
- 2000 — When Augustus Reigned: Christmas Music from the Byzantine Tradition
- 2000 — Tikey Zes Choral Works

== See also ==
- Eastern Orthodox Church
- Byzantine Music
- Cherubikon
- Gregorian Chant
- Fall of Constantinople
