= Shakin' Street (band) =

French hard rock band

- Origin: Paris, France
- Genres: Hard rock
- Years active: 1975–1981; 2004–present
- Label: Columbia
- Members: Fabienne Shine; Jean-Lou Kalinowski
- Past members: Corine Marienneau; Louis Bertignac; Mike Winter; Armik Tigrane; Duck MacDonald; Eric Lévi; Ross "the Boss" Friedman

Shakin' Street are a French hard rock band formed in Paris in 1975 by Fabienne Shine and Eric Lévi. They rose to prominence as a support act for varying rock bands between 1979 and 1981, before disbanding. Their lineup at that time included Jean-Lou Kalinowski (drums, percussion), Ross "the Boss" Friedman (lead guitar), and Mike Winter (bass). Shine reformed Shakin' Street in 2004 and continues to tour and release albums.

== History ==
=== First iteration: 1975–1981 ===
Shakin' Street was formed in 1975 by French musicians Fabienne Shine and Eric Lévi, who met at a club. Initially called Speedball, they later changed their name to Shakin' Street, inspired by the eponymous MC5 song. Shine, the vocalist of the group, chose to sing in English, stating that "French just isn't authentic".

The band's first lineup consisted of bassist Corine Marienneau, guitarist Louis Bertignac, and drummer Jean-Lou Kalinowski. Marienneau and Bertignac were soon replaced by bassist Mike Winter and guitarist Armik Tigrane. In 1978, Shakin' Street released their debut album, Vampire Rock, recorded at Olympic Studios in London, for Columbia Records' international imprint CBS. Vampire Rock reportedly sold over 25,000 copies in their home country. Ira Robbins, writing for Trouser Press, described it as "an impressive, raucous and wild rocker, with English lyrics that touch a number of bases, from sharp to silly".

In 1979, producer Marc Zermati took the members of Shakin' Street to a Blue Öyster Cult concert. Shine later approached Sandy Pearlman, suggesting that he should produce their next album. He subsequently became their manager. That same year, Tigrane was fired after selling his guitar for heroin. Pearlman then enlisted guitarist Ross "the Boss" Friedman to replace him. In August 1979, Shakin' Street played at the Old Waldorf in San Francisco, California. The performance was taped and was released as Scarlet: The Old Waldorf, August 1979, in 2024.

Their next studio album, Shakin' Street (also known as Solid as a Rock), was recorded in San Francisco and released in 1980 by Columbia. (Note: The U.S.-based magazine Trouser Press reported that Shakin' Street was released in July 1980.) While the album received some attention in the music press, reception was mixed, with some writers focusing on the band's uncertain musical style, moving between punk rock and heavy metal. Shine would later assert that Shakin' Street are a hard rock band. Writing for NME, Lynn Hanna remarked that Shakin' Street is a "record characterised by its grace, charm, and poise" and highlighted Friedman's "dizzying acrobatics" in the song "Generation X". Dave Marsh, writing for Rolling Stone, called the album "mediocre" and rated it two out of five stars. Shakin' Street charted at No. 40 on the Swedish album chart Topplistan. The band promoted the record by supporting several groups as openers, including the Clash as well as Black Sabbath and Blue Öyster Cult on their Black & Blue Tour, among others. In 1981, Friedman left Shakin' Street and formed the heavy metal band Manowar with bassist Joey DeMaio, whom he had met on the Black & Blue Tour. Duck MacDonald briefly joined Shakin' Street as guitarist. They disbanded the same year, partially due to strained internal dynamics.

=== Reunion: 2004–present ===
Fabienne Shine went on to collaborate with the American rock band Chrome and pursued a solo career. Eric Lévi became a film composer and later created the musical project Era.

Shakin' Street reunited in 2004, with Shine, Friedman, Kalinowski, and Winter. Guitarist Norbert Krief was also briefly a member of the band that year. They have since released the studio albums 21st Century Love Channel (2009) and Psychic (2014) as well as two live records.

== Band members ==
Current

- Fabienne Shine – vocals (1975–1981, 2004–present)
- Jean-Lou Kalinowski – drums, percussion (1975–1981, 2004–present)

Past

- Corine Marienneau – bass (1975–1977)
- Louis Bertignac – guitars (1975–1977)
- Eric Lévi – guitars, vocals (1975–1981)
- Duck MacDonald – guitars (1981)
- Armik Tigrane – guitars (1977–1979)
- Mike Winter – bass guitar (1977–1981, 2004–2009)
- Norbert Krief – guitars (2004)
- Ross "the Boss" Friedman – lead guitar, vocals (1979–1981, 2004–2026; died 2026)

Timeline

== Discography ==
Studio albums

- Vampire Rock (1978)
- Shakin' Street (also issued as Solid as a Rock, 1980)
- 21st Century Love Channel (2009)
- Psychic (2014)

Live albums

- Live and Raw (1989)
- Live (2004)
- Scarlet: The Old Waldorf, August 1979 (2024)
