= Ameno (song) =

1996 song by Era

Single by Era

from the album Era
- Released: June 1, 1996
- Recorded: 1996
- Genre: New-age, electronic, pop
- Length: 3:56 (Original Version); 3:48 (Remix)
- Label: Polygram (France)
- Songwriters: Eric Lévi, Guy Protheroe
- Producer: Eric Lévi

"Ameno" is a song by French new-age musical project Era. It was released in June 1996 as a single from their self-titled debut album Era and became a chart success in France, Belgium, Sweden, Switzerland, Poland and Latin America.

== Background ==
"Ameno" was written by new-age artist Eric Lévi. The lyrics, by Guy Protheroe, are written in pseudo-Latin, i.e. sounding like Latin but are in fact deliberately devoid of any exact meaning, their interpretation left at the listener's discretion. The vocals are performed by Guy Protheroe and Harriet Jay. Eric Lévi played keyboards and programmed it, whereas Philippe Manca played lead guitar, bass and drums. The choir rendition is by The English Chamber Choir.

== Music video ==
A music video for "Ameno" was shot for the song featuring actors Léonore Confino (sword girl) (version 1), Iréne Bustamante, and Pierre Boisserie (version 2). The music video, mostly set in medieval times, shows three children in modern times who go on an excursion to Montségur. The girl sees a monument and when she touches it, she seems to have memories of a past life. In her vision, a girl (perhaps herself) is seen with a group of children and an eagle on her arm. They are apparently homeless and looking for a place to camp; the place that they choose is the same monument from the beginning of the video. Almost simultaneously, a knight goes to the same place and when he arrives, he tries to behead the monument with his sword, but is unsuccessful. The sword falls near the girl who manages to break the monument. Inside, there is a medallion in the shape of a cross. The girl from the beginning of the video reappears and is wearing the same medallion.

== Charts ==
=== Weekly charts ===
Weekly chart performance for "Ameno"
Chart (1997–98)	Peak position
Belgium (Ultratop 50 Wallonia)	2
France (SNEP)	5
Germany (GfK)	12
Iceland (Íslenski Listinn Topp 40)	32
Sweden (Sverigetopplistan)	5

=== Year-end charts ===
Annual chart rankings for "Ameno"
Chart (1997)	Position
Europe (Eurochart Hot 100)	100

Chart (1998)	Position
Europe Border Breakers (Music & Media)	42
Germany (Official German Charts)	61

== Certifications ==
Certifications and sales for "Ameno"
Region	Certification	Certified units/sales
Belgium (BRMA)	Gold	25,000^{*}
Spain (Promusicae)	Gold	25,000^{^}
Poland (ZPAV)	Platinum	100,000^{*}
Switzerland (IFPI Switzerland)	3× Platinum	150,000^{^}
^{*} Sales figures based on certification alone.^{^} Shipments figures based on certification alone.

== Other versions ==
The song has been interpreted many times and is very popular in covers and parodies. Famous versions include DJ Quicksilver (2000), Roberto Molinaro techno mix version in Italy (2005) and French tenor Vincent Niclo interpretation with the Red Army Choir (2012).

=== DJ Quicksilver version ===
"Ameno"

Single by DJ Quicksilver

from the album Clubfiles - The Album
- Released: 5 March 2001
- Recorded: 2000
- Label: Polydor
- Songwriters: Eric Lévi, Guy Protheroe
- Producers: Tommaso De Donatis; Orhan Terzi

DJ Quicksilver singles chronology
"Bombastic" (2001)	"Ameno" (2001)	"New Life" (2002)

A remix of "Ameno" was made by Turkish-German DJ and music producer DJ Quicksilver. It appeared in the Clubfiles - The Album by DJ Quicksilver and was a hit for him in a number of countries including singles charts in Austria, Belgium (Wallonia French charts), Germany, the Netherlands, and Switzerland. It was produced by Tommaso De Donatis and by Orhan Terzi (actually DJ Quicksilver himself using his real name).

==== Track lists ====
===== CD maxi (Polydor) =====
1. "Ameno
2. "Ameno" (club mix) (6:20)
3. "Ameno" (C.J. Stone remix) (6:22)
4. "Voyage" (6:10)

===== CD maxi (ADN Progressive) =====
1. "Ameno" (radio edit) (3:28)
2. "Ameno" (video mix) (3:00)
3. "Ameno" (club mix) (7:30)
4. "Ameno" (De Donatis mix) (8:14)
5. "Ameno" (C.J. Stone remix) (7:39)
6. "Ameno" (Analog masters remix) (6:01)

==== Charts ====
Chart (2001)	Peak position
Austria (Ö3 Austria Top 40)	13
Belgium (Ultratop 50 Wallonia)	6
Europe (Eurochart Hot 100)	75
Germany (GfK)	18
Netherlands (Dutch Top 40)	30
Spain (Promusicae)	12
Switzerland (Schweizer Hitparade)	20

=== Vincent Niclo & Les Chœurs de l'Armée Rouge version ===
"Ameno"

Single by Vincent Niclo & Les Chœurs de l'Armée Rouge

from the album Opéra rouge
- Released: 2012
- Recorded: 2012
- Label: Universal
- Songwriters: Eric Lévi, Guy Protheroe
- Producer: Florent Bidoyen

French tenor Vincent Niclo recorded the song accompanied by the MVD Ensemble (widely known as Red Army Choir or in French as credited in the recording, "Les Chœurs de l'Armée Rouge").

The song appeared on his album Opéra rouge and was released as a single in France reaching #87 in SNEP, the official French Singles Chart.

==== Charts ====
Chart (2012)	Peak position
Belgium (Ultratip Bubbling Under Wallonia)	17
France (SNEP)	87

=== Ameno Amapiano Remix ===
"Ameno Amapiano Remix"

Single by NekTunez featuring Goya Menor
- Released: 16 June 2021
- Genre: Amapiano
- Songwriter: NekTunez
- Producer: NekTunez

A cover known as "Ameno Amapiano Remix" was made by Ghanaian music producer, Nektunez who paired Nigerian Singer, Goya Menor. It charted at number 1 on the Billboard music chart. It was released on 16 June 2021. Goya Menor was inspired to remix the original while listening to the song in a night club. The song was sung and rapped by Menor while Nektunez served as the producer and song writer. "Ameno Amapiano Remix" became popular in late 2021 and was commonly used in night clubs to announce when expensive drinks are purchased. It also gained popularity on the social networking site, TikTok and was used in over half a million videos and responsible for the internet slang, "You want to bam ba?". It is regarded as the anthem of Detty December. Menor performed the song at the Livespot X Festival by Tiwa Savage.

Chart (2021)	Peak Position
France (SNEP)	117
US World Digital Song Sales (Billboard)	1

== In popular media ==
Mexican luchador enmascarado Místico has used the song as his entrance music in Consejo Mundial de Lucha Libre (CMLL), New Japan Pro-Wrestling (NJPW) and Lucha Libre AAA Worldwide (AAA). The use of the song in YouTube videos and Twitch streams has led to its popularisation as an internet meme, with a resurgence in popularity as a TikTok meme in early 2020. It also has been utilized by Napoli fans as a tribute song to association football player Victor Osimhen and his contribution to the team's successful results in the 2022–23 Serie A season.
