= People and Places (song) =

1994 song

Single by Dee Dee Bridgewater & Philip Bailey

from the album La Vengeance d'une Blonde Original Soundtrack
- B-side: "People and Places (instrumental)"
- Released: 1994
- Recorded: Los Angeles & Paris
- Studio: Studio Mega
- Genre: Pop, electronic, house
- Length: 4:00
- Label: BMG France
- Songwriter(s): Eric Levi, Philip Bailey, Roxanne Seeman
- Producer(s): Eric Levi

Music video
- People and Places on YouTube

"People and Places" is a song written by French composer Eric Lévi, American singer Philip Bailey, and American songwriter Roxanne Seeman for the French film La Vengeance d'une Blonde. It is the end-credit song for the #1 French box office film starring Christian Clavier and starring Christian Clavier and Marie-Anne Chazel and scored by Levi. The song was recorded as a duet between Dee Dee Bridgewater and Philip Bailey and released as a single and 12" club mix by BMG France in 1994. The single, club mix, and instrumental versions appear on the soundtrack album. The single version was included as a bonus track on the Japanese release of Philip Bailey's solo album Philip Bailey.

== Background ==
Levi met Roxanne Seeman at the Warner/Chappell Music Paris office. After scoring Les Visiteurs and while working on his score for La Vengeance d'une Blonde Levi proposed writing a song with Seeman and Philip Bailey for the film.

== Recording ==
The recording of "People and Places" took place in Paris with Eric Lévi on keyboards and Philippe Manca on guitar. The vocals were recorded as a duet between Philip Bailey and Dee Dee Bridgewater, with Philip Bailey recording vocals in Los Angeles and Dee Dee Bridgewater recording her vocals in Paris. The final mix was at Studio Mega.

== Credits and personnel ==
- Eric Levi – producer
- Philip Bailey – lead vocal
- Dee Dee Bridgewater – lead vocal
- Philippe Manca – guitars
- Frederick Rousseau - keyboards
- Studio Mega – recording studio, Paris
