= La Vengeance d'une blonde =

- Directed by: Jeannot Szwarc
- Written by: Michel Delgado; Valentine Albin; Marie-Anne Chazel; Bernard Murat
- Produced by: Marie Meunier
- Starring: Christian Clavier; Marie-Anne Chazel; Annie Cordy; Clémentine Célarié; Thierry Lhermitte
- Cinematography: Jean-Yves Le Mener
- Edited by: Catherine Kelber
- Music by: Eric Levi
- Distributed by: AMLF
- Release date: 26 January 1994
- Running time: 95 minutes
- Country: France
- Language: French
- Box office: $12.2 million

La Vengeance d'une blonde is a 1994 French comedy film directed by Jeannot Szwarc.

== Plot ==
Gérard Breha is a journalist on a Breton regional channel. He hosts happily his last show, as he has been named host to the 23 hours newsreader on the large private TV channel 8. He moves with his wife Corine, an actress, and their two children in Paris, tentatively in Jany (great seductress), the mother of Corine, to start a new life.

== Cast ==
- Christian Clavier as Gérard Bréha
- Marie-Anne Chazel as Corine Bréha
- Annie Cordy as Jany
- Clémentine Célarié as Marie-Ange de la Baume
- Thierry Lhermitte as Gilles Favier
- Marc de Jonge as Vernon
- Philippe Khorsand as Régis Montdor
- Angelo Infanti as Giacomo Contini
- Antoine Duléry as Alex
- Franck de la Personne as Stéphane
- Jean-Paul Muel as Castol
- Maurice Lamy as The Albino
- Mathias Jung as The Hail
- François Toumarkine as Ventru
- Laurent Gendron as Goulot
- Véronique Moest as Bella
- Naël Kervoas as Athéna
- Michel Vivier as Raymond
- Michel Fortin as Norbert
- Urbain Cancelier as The delivery guy
- Fabienne Chaudat as The servant

== Reception ==
La Vengeance d’une blonde received positive reviews and opened at number one in France. It totaled more than 2 million admission tickets in 1994.

== Soundtrack ==
Cover artwork of the soundtrack

Eric Lévi composed the score for La Vengeance d'une blonde following his score for Les Visiteurs, also starring Christian Clavier, and the highest-grossing film to date in France in 1993.

The song, People and Places, appearing over the end credits, was written by Lévi with Roxanne Seeman and Philip Bailey, and is performed by Bailey as a duet with Dee Dee Bridgewater. Philippe Manca is the guitarist on both the song and score. Thierry Rogan mixed the track at Studio Mega. Eric Lévi and Frédérick Rousseau played keyboards on the soundtrack.

=== Track listing ===
No.	Title	Writer(s)	Artist	Length
1.	"People and Places"	Eric Levi, Philip Bailey, Roxanne Seeman	Dee Dee Bridgewater & Philip Bailey	4:07
2.	"The City Of Lights"	Levi		1:41
3.	"The City Of Lights (Lead Guitar)"	Levi		1:41
4.	"People and Places (Club Mix)"	Levi, Bailey, Seeman	Dee Dee Bridgewater & Philip Bailey	4:07
5.	"YAM Intro"	Leonard Caston, Anita Poree		0:13
6.	"King Of The Night"	Levi		3:50
7.	"YAM Exit"	Levi		0:13
8.	"TV 8 Countdown"	Levi		0:51
9.	"Melo Sax"	Levi		0:19
10.	"Back To Zero"	Levi		0:40
11.	"Séduction"	Levi		1:14
12.	"Hijack"	Levi		1:40
13.	"People and Places (Instrumental)"	Levi, Bailey, Seeman		4:07
14.	"YAM's World"	Levi		1:50
15.	"YAM 4"	Levi		0:50
16.	"YAM 5"	Levi		0:50
