= Era 2 =

Studio album by Era
- Released: June 21, 2000
- Genre: New-age
- Label: Mercury Records

Era chronology
Era (1996)	Era 2 (2000)	The Mass (2003)

Era 2 is the second studio album by French new-age project Era.

Videos were shot for "Divano", "Infanati" and "Misere Mani" featuring actors Pierre Bouisierie and Irene Bustamante.

== Track listing ==
1. "Omen Sore" – 4:39
2. "Divano" – 3:53
3. "Devore Amante" – 4:14
4. "Sentence" – 4:55
5. "Don't U" – 3:49
6. "Infanati" – 4:26
7. "Madona" – 4:17
8. "Hymne" – 4:55
9. "Misere Mani" – 4:03
10. "In Fine" – 4:22
  "In Fine" – 0:43
  silence – 0.57
  "Ghost Finale" (hidden track) – 2:42

== Charts ==
=== Weekly charts ===
Chart (2000)	Peak position
Australian Albums (ARIA Charts)	53
Austrian Albums (Ö3 Austria)	23
Belgian Albums (Ultratop Flanders)	32
Belgian Albums (Ultratop Wallonia)	2
Dutch Albums (Album Top 100)	13
Finnish Albums (Suomen virallinen lista)	29
French Albums (SNEP)	2
German Albums (Offizielle Top 100)	12
Hungarian Albums (MAHASZ)	4
Norwegian Albums (VG-lista)	10
Swedish Albums (Sverigetopplistan)	8
Swiss Albums (Schweizer Hitparade)	4

=== Year-end charts ===
Chart (2000)	Position
Belgian Albums (Ultratop Wallonia)	11
Danish Albums (Hitlisten)	95
Dutch Albums (Album Top 100)	63
European Albums (Music & Media)	47
French Albums (SNEP)	27
Swedish Albums (Sverigetopplistan)	100
Swiss Albums (Schweizer Hitparade)	42

== Certifications ==
Region	Certification	Certified units/sales
Argentina (CAPIF)	Gold	30,000^{^}
Belgium (BRMA)	Gold	25,000^{*}
France (SNEP)	Platinum	300,000^{*}
Mexico (AMPROFON)	Gold	100,000^{^}
Switzerland (IFPI Switzerland)	Gold	25,000^{^}
^{*} Sales figures based on certification alone.^{^} Shipments figures based on certification alone.
