= Era (Era album) =

Studio album by Era
- Released: 1996
- Genre: New-age
- Length: 40:23
- Label: Tranman Entertainment B.V., Mercury, Philips
- Producer: Eric Lévi

Era chronology
Era (1996)	Era 2 (2000)

Professional ratings
Review scores
Source	Rating
AllMusic	4/5 stars

Era is the debut studio album by Eric Lévi's new-age project Era, first released in 1996 and re-released in 1998. Some editions include bonus track "After Time".

== Use of Era music ==
- "Enae Volare (Mezzo)" is famous amongst mixed martial arts fans because it has been used as the entrance song of MMA legend Fedor Emelianenko.
- "Ameno" was used as the entrance theme song by Mexican wrestler Místico from CMLL (Sin Cara in WWE, Myzteziz in AAA) as well as mixed martial artist Aleksander Emelianenko.
- "Ameno" was used in Australia within "The Power of Yes" advertisements for Optus Communications. It was used in a World Cup 1998 commercial from MasterCard.
- Ameno played during Jennifer Hawkins' infamous wardrobe malfunction at Westfield Miranda on September 2, 2004.
- A remix of Ameno was made by DJ Quicksilver in 2000.
- A remix of "Mother" is also used in the 2001 film Driven.

Videos were shot for "Ameno", "Enae Volare" and "Mother" featuring actors Pierre Boisserie and Irene Bustamante.

== Track listing ==
All tracks are written by Eric Lévi, except where noted.

No.	Title	Writer(s)	Length
1.	"Era"		3:15
2.	"Ameno (Remix)"	Lévi, Guy Protheroe	3:50
3.	"Cathar Rhythm"		3:18
4.	"Avemano"		4:14
5.	"Enae Volare (Mezzo)"	Lévi, Protheroe	4:30
6.	"Ameno"	Lévi, Protheroe	3:40
7.	"Mirror"		3:57
8.	"Sempire d'Amor"		1:54
9.	"After Time"	Lévi, Florence Dedam	3:35
10.	"Impera"		4:37
11.	"Enae Volare"		3:33
Total length:			40:23

Limited edition
No.	Title	Writer(s)	Length
12.	"Mother"	Lévi, Dedam	4:59
13.	"Enae Volare (Mezzo) (Remix)"	Lévi, Protheroe	3:47
Total length:			49:09

== Philips and Mercury release (1996) ==
All tracks are written by Eric Lévi, except where noted.

No.	Title	Writer(s)	Length
1.	"Era"		3:15
2.	"Ameno (remix)"	Lévi (music)/Lévi, Guy Protheroe (lyric)	3:48
3.	"Cathar Rhythm"		3:21
4.	"Mother"	Lévi (music)/Florence Dedam (lyric)	4:59
5.	"Avemano"		4:16
6.	"Enae Volare (Mezzo)"	Lévi (music)/Lévi, Protheroe (lyric)	4:30
7.	"Mirror"		3:58
8.	" Ameno"	Lévi (music)/Lévi, Protheroe (lyric)	4:20
9.	"Sempire d’Amor"		1:54
10.	"After Time"	Dedam	3:35
11.	"Impera"		4:37

== 2002 Mercury release ==
This release contains alternative versions and mixes of most of the songs. Only "Ameno (remix)", "Cathar Rhythm", "Mirror" and "Impera" are identical with the original release.

All tracks are written by Eric Lévi, except where noted.

No.	Title	Writer(s)	Length
1.	"Ameno (remix)"	Lévi (music)/Lévi, Guy Protheroe (lyric)	3:50
2.	"Misere Mani" (from 1998)		4:04
3.	"Mother (remix)" (from 1997)	Lévi (music)/Florence Dedam (lyric)	4:09
4.	"Enae Volare (Mezzo)" (alternative version from 1996)	Lévi (music)/Lévi, Protheroe (lyric)	3:49
5.	"Era" (2002 remix)		3:16
6.	"Ameno" (2002 remix)	Lévi (music)/Lévi, Protheroe (lyric)	3:56
7.	"Cathar Rhythm"		3:21
8.	"Mirror"		3:59
9.	"Mother" (2002 remix)	Lévi (music)/Dedam (lyric)	4:26
10.	"Impera"		4:36

== Personnel ==
- Eric Lévi – keyboards, programming, mixing, engineering, mastering, production, guitars (7, 9, 10)
- Guy Protheroe – vocals (2, 6, 11)
- Eric Geisen – vocals (3)
- Florence Dedam – vocals (9, 12)
- Murielle Lefebvre – vocals (5)
- Harriet Jay – vocals (2–4, 6)
- Neil Wilkinson – drums (4)
- Lee Sklar – bass guitar (4)
- Philippe Manca – guitars (1–4, 6, 8, 11, 12), mandolin (1), programming (1, 2, 6)

== Charts ==
=== Weekly charts ===
Chart (1997–2004)	Peak position
Australian Albums (ARIA Charts)	53
Austrian Albums (Ö3 Austria)	41
Belgian Albums (Ultratop Flanders)	20
Belgian Albums (Ultratop Wallonia)	1
Dutch Albums (Album Top 100)	4
Finnish Albums (Suomen virallinen lista)	1
French Albums (SNEP)	1
German Albums (Offizielle Top 100)	2
Hungarian Albums (MAHASZ)	9
Italian Albums (FIMI)	52
Norwegian Albums (VG-lista)	2
Portuguese Albums (AFP)	1
Swedish Albums (Sverigetopplistan)	1
Swiss Albums (Schweizer Hitparade)	2

=== Year-end charts ===
Chart (1997)	Position
Belgian Albums (Ultratop Flanders)	100
Belgian Albums (Ultratop Wallonia)	2
Dutch Albums (Album Top 100)	80
European Top 100 Albums (Music & Media)	25
French Albums (SNEP)	3
German Albums (Offizielle Top 100)	67
Swedish Albums (Sverigetopplistan)	7
Swiss Albums (Schweizer Hitparade)	30

Chart (1998)	Position
Belgian Albums (Ultratop Wallonia)	52
Danish Albums (Hitlisten)	18
Dutch Albums (Album Top 100)	8
European Top 100 Albums (Music & Media)	11
French Albums (SNEP)	8
German Albums (Offizielle Top 100)	18
Swedish Albums (Sverigetopplistan)	38
Swiss Albums (Schweizer Hitparade)	16

Chart (1999)	Position
Dutch Albums (Album Top 100)	100

Chart (2001)	Position
French Albums (SNEP)	75

== Certifications and sales ==
Region	Certification	Certified units/sales
Argentina (CAPIF)	2× Platinum	120,000^{^}
Belgium (BRMA)	Platinum	50,000^{*}
Canada (Music Canada)	Gold	50,000^{^}
Finland (Musiikkituottajat)	Platinum	52,717
France (SNEP)	Diamond	1,000,000^{*}
Mexico (AMPROFON)	2× Gold	200,000^{^}
Netherlands (NVPI)	Platinum	100,000^{^}
Norway (IFPI Norway)	2× Platinum	100,000^{*}
Poland	—	100,000
Sweden (GLF)	2× Platinum	200,000^{^}
Summaries
Europe	—	3,500,000
^{*} Sales figures based on certification alone.^{^} Shipments figures based on certification alone.
