= Tell Me I'm Not Dreaming =

Single by Katherine Jenkins

from the album Believe – Platinum Edition
- Released: 29 November 2010 (UK)
- Recorded: 2010
- Genre: Classical crossover
- Length: 3:47
- Songwriters: David Hodges, Steve McEwan
- Producer: John Shanks

Katherine Jenkins singles chronology
"Fear of Falling" (2010)	"Tell Me I'm Not Dreaming" (2010)

"Tell Me I'm Not Dreaming" is a song by Welsh classical singer Katherine Jenkins, released as the first single from the platinum edition of her seventh studio album Believe, and sixth single from the album as a whole. The song had its world exclusive first play on Ken Bruce's BBC Radio 2 show on 19 October 2010 and was released in the UK on 29 November 2010. A music video was recorded and a clip of it was shown on the Graham Norton Show.
