= Nektunez =

Ghanaian record producer

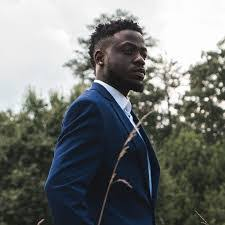
- Nektunez

Background information
- Also known as: Nektunez
- Born: Noble Zogli
- Origin: West Africa
- Genres: Afrobeats; Amapiano; pop; hip hop; R&B; world music; Afro house; Afropop
- Occupations: Record producer; Sound engineer; Artiste; DJ
- Instruments: Keyboard; synthesizer; drum; Guitar; shekere; sampler
- Years active: 2008–present
- Website: nektunez.com

Noble Zogli professionally known as Nektunez is a Ghanaian music producer, sound engineer and a DJ. He came into the limelight after his Amapiano remix of the ERA song "Ameno" became a global hit in the last quarter of 2021. In December 2021, the remixed song debuted at number 1 on Billboard World Digital sales. It also became the number 1 song on Shazam global 200 chart. By February 2022, TikTok videos created with the song had almost 10 billion views. Billboard U.S. released its first top 10 Afrobeats charts, with ‘Ameno Amapiano Remix’ charting at number 7. Nektunez also Produced the late Mohbad's Global hit Song, Ask about me, where He blends Amapiano perfectly with ancient choral chants, Afrobeat and Street-Rap genre. Ask about me became the number 1 song on both Spotify and Apple Music. Debuted on billboard Hot Trending Songs Powered by X Charts, world Shazam charts and also number 10 on the official Afrobeats chart uk.

== Early life and career beginning ==
Nektunez was born in West Africa, where he grew up.

He started his music journey by playing traditional and percussion instruments in the church and school after which he settled on music as a career.

== Education ==
He holds a bachelor's degree in political science from the University of Ghana.
