= English Chamber Choir =

English choir group

- English Chamber Choir logo

Background information
- Years active: 1972–present
- Members: Conductor Guy Protheroe
- Website: englishchamberchoir.com

The English Chamber Choir is a choir based in England.

== History ==
The English Chamber Choir came into existence in 1972; its earliest engagements included Haydn's Nelson Mass, Fauré's Requiem and Kodály's Laudes Organi with Hertfordshire Chamber Orchestra, and live performances at the old Rainbow Theatre in Finsbury Park, of the rock opera Tommy with London Symphony Orchestra and guest soloists. These were followed by Rick Wakeman's Journey to the Centre of the Earth with the London Symphony Orchestra at the Royal Festival Hall.

Over the years the choir has performed in all the major concert halls in London (South Bank, Barbican, St John's Smith Square, Cadogan Hall), in St Paul's Cathedral, Westminster Abbey, Westminster Cathedral and many other churches known for their musical traditions. It has sung abroad in Brussels, Antwerp, Basel, Zurich, Athens and Plovdiv (Bulgaria), and has visited many cities, towns and villages throughout the UK. It has appeared at the Chelsea Festival, the Byzantine Festival in London and as part of the Encounters exhibition at the Barber Institute in Birmingham. In May 2012 it made its debut at the Brighton Festival - England's biggest arts festival. It has sung by invitation for the Lord Mayor of London at the Mansion House and HM The Queen at Buckingham Palace and Windsor Castle.

In 2012 it re-recorded Wakeman's Journey to the Centre of the Earth at Abbey Road Studios.

== Musical associations ==
The choir sings regularly with the Belmont Ensemble at St Martin-in-the-Fields, in London's Trafalgar Square, performing popular classics including Mozart's Requiem, Fauré's Requiem, Vivaldi's Gloria and Handel's Messiah. It has also commissioned many new works, most recently the Troparion of Kassiani from the Greek-Canadian composer Christos Hatzis and Sub tuum praesidium by Ivan Moody.

The choir's repertoire spans at least five centuries. Although not a specialist 'early music' choir, it performs many a cappella works from the 16th and 17th centuries. It has in repertoire all the major choral/orchestral works of the baroque and classical era: Bach's Passions and the B Minor Mass, Handel's Dixit Dominus, Solomon and many other oratorios, the Masses of Mozart and Haydn together with Mozart's Requiem and Haydn's The Creation. On occasion it has expanded its forces to perform Brahms' Requiem and Elgar's Dream of Gerontius.

Its a cappella repertoire includes a wide spectrum from Tallis to Tavener. Britten and Poulenc feature prominently, together with Richard Strauss, Schoenberg, Arnold Bax and many other Romantic composers.

For many years the choir featured on albums by Vangelis, and is probably best known for being featured on his soundtrack to the Ridley Scott film 1492: Conquest of Paradise. Other credits include the Era albums created by the French composer Eric Lévi. The choir's relationship with Rick Wakeman, begun in 1974, continues to this day. In 2009 it appeared live with Wakeman at Hampton Court in a revival of his first solo album The Six Wives of Henry VIII as part of the celebrations of the 500th anniversary of Henry's accession to the throne and a few weeks later at Cadogan Hall in his 'unplugged' piano, choir and orchestra programme: P'n'O

The choir has a special association with contemporary music written for the Orthodox Church and/or inspired by Eastern traditions. It has sung and recorded many works by John Tavener, Ivan Moody and Christos Hatzis, among others. It has also collaborated on several occasions with the William Tyndale Society in programmes exploring not only the words of Tyndale himself, but the use of vernacular texts in sacred music across Europe.

== Fortieth anniversary ==
In October 2012 the choir celebrated its 40th anniversary with a concert in St John's Smith Square. This included works by Bach, Bax, Tallis (the 40-part motet Spem in alium), Christos Hatzis and Ivan Moody. Paddy O'Connell and Rick Wakeman were guests.

== Film, television and radio ==
Film credits include 1492: Conquest of Paradise and Band of Brothers.

The choir has appeared on Gordon Ramsey's Christmas Cookalong (when his guest was Gok Wan), on Chris Moyles' Quiz Night singing hymn-tunes to Stephen Fry, and from 2008 to 2011 has written and sung satirical versions of popular Christmas Carols on Radio 4's Broadcasting House on the Sunday morning before Christmas.

== Partial discography ==
A selection of recordings including the choir includes:

Patricia Rozario
English Chamber Choir, directed by Guy Protheroe
Members of Cappella Romana (director Alexander Lingas)
Choral Settings of Kassiani - issued on the NAXOS label

1. Kassiani (9th century): Troparion for Holy Wednesday (Byzantine Chant)
2. Christos Hatzis (born 1953): The Troparion of Kassiani
3. Mikis Theodorakis (born 1925): The Troparion of Kassiani
4. Ivan Moody (born 1964): The Troparion of Kassiani
5. Nikolaos Mantzaros (1795–1872): The Troparion of Kassiani
6. Ivan Moody (born 1964): When Augustus Reigned
7. Kassiani (9th century): When Augustus Reigned (Byzantine Chant)

English Chamber Choir, directed by Guy Protheroe
Eclectica

1. Nicolae Lunghu: Pre tine te laudam
2. John Tavener: Song for Athene
3. Sergei Rachmaninov: Bogoroditse Dievo
4. Jan Pieterszoon Sweelinck: Psalm 33
5. Thomas Tallis: If ye love me
6. John Tavener: O Thou Gentle Light
7. Christos Hatzis: Easter Kontakion
8. Egon Wellesz: Festive Prelude on a Byzantine Magnificat
9. George Frideric Handel: As pants the hart
10. Francis Poulenc: Exultate Deo
11. James Sellars: Slow Fox Trot from Kissing Songs
12. James Sellars: Maxixe from Kissing Songs
13. Rick Wakeman: Childhood Dreams
14. Joseph Kosma, arr. Andrew Carter: Autumn Leaves
15. Harold Arlen, arr. Guy Turner: Over the Rainbow
16. Carmelo Pace: L'Imnarja
17. Hugh Martin and Ralph Blane, arr. Peter Gritton: A Merry Christmas

ERA - Eric Levi

1. "Era" – 3:15
2. "Ameno" (Remix) – 3:50
3. "Cathar Rhythm" – 3:18
4. "Avemano" – 4:14
5. "Enae Volare (Mezzo)" – 4:30
6. "Mirror" – 3:57
7. "Ameno" – 3:40
8. "Sempire d'Amor" – 1:54
9. "After time" – 3:35
10. "Impera" – 4:37
11. "Enae Volare" – 3:33
12. "Mother" [Limited Edition] – 4:59
13. "Enae Volare (Mezzo)" (Remix) [Limited Edition] – 3:47

Featured on the track "Supertzar" on Black Sabbath's Sabotage album.
