= The Very Best of Era =

Greatest hits album by ErA
- Released: 2004
- Recorded: 1996–2004
- Genre: New-age
- Label: Mercury Records

ErA chronology
The Mass (2003)	The Very Best of Era (2004)	Reborn (2008)

Professional ratings
Review scores
Source	Rating
Allmusic	3.5/5 stars

The Very Best of Era is a collection of songs from previous albums and remixes by Era.

== Track listing ==
1. "Ameno" (remix) – 3:49
2. "Don't Go Away" – 4:24
3. "The Mass" – 3:42
4. "Mother" (remix) – 4:11
5. "Misere Mani" – 4:06
6. "Avemano Orchestral" – 4:21
7. "Looking for Something" – 4:10
8. "Don't U" – 2:58
9. "Enae Volare" – 3:36
10. "Cathar Rhythm" – 3:20
11. "Divano" – 3:55
12. "Don't You Forget" – 3:42
13. "Hymne" – 4:56
14. "Sentence" – 4:53
15. "I Believe" – 4:25
16. "Looking for Something" (Darren Tate mix edit) – 3:19

== Premium Video Edition ==
A "Premium" version was also released at the same time which includes a Video DVD. The back cover reads "The Complete Era video collection including all Era music videos and special features."

Music videos include:
1. Misere Mani
2. Mother
3. The Mass
4. Looking For Something
5. Ameno
6. Infanati
7. Enae Volare Mezzo
8. Divano
9. Looking For Something Remix

== Charts ==
=== Year-end charts ===
Chart (2004–2005)	Peak position
Belgian Albums (Ultratop Wallonia)	13
Italian Albums (FIMI)	12
Norwegian Albums (VG-lista)	2
Portuguese Albums (AFP)	15
Swedish Albums (Sverigetopplistan)	11
Swiss Albums (Schweizer Hitparade)	13

=== Year-end charts ===
Chart (2004)	Position
Belgian Albums (Ultratop Wallonia)	68

== Certifications ==
Region	Certification	Certified units/sales
France (SNEP)	Platinum	300,000^{*}
Mexico (AMPROFON)	Gold	50,000^{^}
Switzerland (IFPI Switzerland)	Gold	20,000^{^}
^{*} Sales figures based on certification alone.^{^} Shipments figures based on certification alone.
