= Guy Protheroe =

British conductor, musician and composer

Guy Protheroe is a British conductor, musical director, composer and musicologist/forensic musicologist. He has been conductor and musical director of the contemporary music ensemble Spectrum and the English Chamber Choir throughout his career. He collaborated with artists such as Rick Wakeman, Vangelis and Eric Lévi.

== Early life and education ==
Protheroe was born in Worcester in 1947 and began his musical education as a boy chorister at Canterbury Cathedral. He received Music scholarships followed to St Edward's School, Oxford and Magdalen College, Oxford, where he obtained a bachelor's degree in music, and also sang as a Lay Clerk at New College.

== Career ==
Protheroe started his career with his academic pursuits developing interest in music theory and composition during this time, his notable collaboration with the renowned Greek musician Vangelis get him into prominence during the late 1980s.

He led the premiere performance of the Arts Council Contemporary Music Network series, as well as the opening concert of the first Huddersfield Festival of Contemporary Music with the Philip Jones Brass Ensemble. In 2000, he directed a series of staged performances of Xenakis' Oresteia at the Royal Opera House's Linbury Studio Theatre in Covent Garden, garnering rave acclaim.

During the 1990s Spectrum ceased to promote or perform on a regular basis, due to a combination of circumstances: the Arditti String Quartet had risen to become one of the most acclaimed and busiest string quartets anywhere, leaving its players little time to do anything else; Yvar Mikhashoff succumbed to Aids and died in Buffalo in 1993; there was very little public funding dedicated to new music performance (and much of the music then being written was in new styles which turned out to be much more programmable in mainstream classical concerts), and in addition the Protheroes were increasingly in demand in the sphere of commercial music. However, in almost a full circle, Spectrum was brought together again in January 2000 to give the first professional performances in the newly constructed Linbury Studio Theatre at the Royal Opera House, Covent Garden. The promoter was Lina Lalandi, and the work was Xenakis's Oresteia Suite, in a staged version by the French director Alain Germain. For this production the ensemble was extended to include a group of singers and actors and the performances received universally outstanding critical acclaim.

== The English Chamber Choir (ECC) ==
The English Chamber Choir was formed by the conductor David Measham as a splinter group from the London Symphony Chorus and formally constituted in 1972. A few months later it was in need of a chorus master to deputise while the current post-holder was away from London. Protheroe began working with the Choir and has continued ever since. When David Measham left for Australia, Protheroe was appointed conductor and musical director and together he and the Choir have enjoyed over four decades of music-making, in venues ranging from the Royal Albert Hall to village churches in France and Switzerland, singing music from over six centuries in numerous languages and recording not only classical albums and CDs but also taking part in many live and recorded commercial productions. It was in 1972 and '73 that the newly-formed Choir was invited to sing in the stage performances of the rock opera Tommy with The Who, and the 1973 shows at the Rainbow Theatre in Finsbury Park, London, were Protheroe's introduction to the commercial business of 'popular' music – an area in which he became immediately at home and frequently involved, alongside his more 'classical' engagements. Both Protheroe and the choir took part in the live concert and recording of Rick Wakeman's Journey to the Centre of the Earth at the Royal Festival Hall in January 1974 and the Choir also took part in the 40th anniversary UK tour and a new recording of the work in an extended version in 2014, all conducted by Protheroe.

Over the years Protheroe has directed the ECC in hundreds of performances and projects in the UK and also in Belgium, Bulgaria, France, Greece and Switzerland. A few years after the ECC was founded a chamber orchestra, the English Players, was formed to accompany it in the choral/orchestral repertoire from the 17th century onwards, playing on period instruments as appropriate, both in the UK and Europe. Together the Choir and Players have performed works ranging from Monteverdi's Vespers of 1610, through Bach's Passions and the B minor Mass, Handel's Dixit Dominus and Messiah, Mozart's Requiem and C minor Mass, to Brahms Ein Deutsches Requiem and Elgar's The Dream of Gerontius. In May 2012 he conducted the Choir and Players in a very rare revival of the Portuguese composer Antonio Teixeira's Te Deum (1734) for 16 soloists, 5 choirs and orchestra at the Brighton Festival. The Choir's unaccompanied (a cappella) repertoire ranges from mediaeval times to today – highlights including Thomas Tallis's 40-part motet Spem in alium which it has performed by invitation of the Lord Mayor of London at the Mansion House, and many compositions inspired by the music of the Eastern Church (and in particular Byzantine chant) including Sir John Tavener, Ivan Moody and the Greek-Canadian composer Christos Hatzis. The Choir has sung publicly in the presence of HM The Queen and most senior members of the Royal Family and, at the personal invitation of HM The Queen, at Buckingham Palace and Windsor Castle.

Together Protheroe and the ECC have a long list of recording credits which include The Byzantine Legacy (Sony Greece, 2000) EcleCtiCa (2008) and The Troparion of Kassiani (Naxos, 2011). [These titles are all available for download.] The Choir is also featured on many of the albums on which Protheroe collaborated with Vangelis, Rick Wakeman, Eric Lévi and many others. (See discography for more details)

In recent years the ECC has enjoyed a successful association with the Belmont Ensemble and their conductor Peter G Dyson, taking part in many concerts at the Church of St Martin-in-the-Fields in Trafalgar Square, London.

Protheroe has also conducted with the Choir and Players a wide range of Jewish music, often in his own arrangements, in concerts and recordings, including contributing to the massive Milken Archive of American Jewish Music.

In the choir's 50th-anniversary season (2022–2023) Protheroe has conducted the choir in concerts ranging from Cadogan Hall, Chelsea, to Tuscany in Italy, and also rock concerts and live music to screen film shows in the Royal Albert Hall, The London Palladium, and on tour in the UK.

He has also appeared with the Choir many times on television shows with stars including Stephen Fry, Gordon Ramsey and Chris Moyles, and also on BBC Radio 2, 3 and 4 – with for several years a regular slot each year the Sunday before Christmas on Radio 4's Broadcasting House with Paddy O'Connell.

== Commercial music ==
After beginning as chorus master for The Who's Tommy, Protheroe has worked on films, television and radio commercials and in concerts with a wide variety of artists as conductor, musical director, arranger, composer and lyricist including John Anderson, Tangerine Dream, Black Sabbath, George Martin, Larry Adler, Barrington Pheloung, Dave Stewart, David Arnold, Roy Wood and Mark Almond. He had a long-standing relationship with Vangelis as musical director, arranger, lyricist and vocal soloist in many recordings and films, from the 1975 album Heaven and Hell to the Ridley Scott films Blade Runner and 1492: Conquest of Paradise. Concert venues with Vangelis include the Royal Albert Hall, the Royal Festival Hall, a Docklands concert in Rotterdam to an audience of nearly 300,000 and a concert on the Acropolis in Athens, both the latter with live television coverage. He was chorus master for the Vangelis title music for the 2002 World Cup, and in 2004 he recorded an album of Vangelis works with Giorgia Fumanti, a second album following in 2005. In 2012 the BBC commissioned from Protheroe a large-scale orchestration of the title music of Conquest of Paradise for Music Nation, performed in Glasgow in March 2012 by 300 singers and musicians as part of the 2012 Olympic celebrations.

Protheroe has also long been associated with Rick Wakeman, from the 1974 Journey to the Centre of the Earth and 1975 The Myths and Legends of King Arthur and the Knights of the Round Table (performed on ice in Wembley Arena) to the 1999 Return to the Centre of the Earth and The New Gospels, and the more recent albums The Wizard and the Forest of all Dreams (2002), Out There (2003) and the DVD Amazing Grace (2007). With his wife, Ann Manly, he has orchestrated all the works for an "unplugged" concert programme (Rick on concert grand piano, with symphony orchestra and chorus) first given in Bulgaria in 2008, and he has since conducted many further performances in London (Chelsea Festival), the Lugano Jazz Festival (Switzerland), Poland, Chile and Argentina, in Cheltenham Centaur and also in the Queen Elizabeth Hall, London. In May 2009 he conducted two large-scale open-air performances of a new and expanded, orchestrated version of The Six Wives of Henry VIII at Hampton Court Palace with Wakeman celebrating 500 years of the accession of Henry VIII, also released on DVD and CD. In September 2012, he conducted the recording of the new expanded version of Journey to the Centre of the Earth in Abbey Road Studios and also conducted the first live performance of this version, together with The Six Wives of Henry VIII, in Buenos Aires. (The new orchestrations of all these recent albums have also been undertaken by Protheroe and Ann Manly.) Among other concerts and recordings, in April/May 2014 he conducted Journey on a 14-concert UK tour, with a further concert tour in October 2014 of Argentina and Brazil. In June 2016 he conducted with Wakeman a revival and expansion of King Arthur at the O2 Arena in London (and recorded it for CD in April 2015). For this he had to reconstruct all the original score by ear and, together with his wife Ann Manly, orchestrate an equal amount of new music. In 2018 he conducted recordings for a new album Piano Odyssey and also more P’n’O performances in Argentina, the Czech Republic and Ukraine. In June 2019 he conducted a private gala concert of the P’n’O programme in Moscow with the Russian Philharmonic Orchestra and Chorus (in one of Moscow's palatial railway stations), and in July at the Royal Festival Hall in London two nights of Journey to the Centre of the Earth, for Wakeman's 70th birthday celebrations (and 45 years on from when he was chorus master for the first performances of Journey in the RFH in 1974). Post Covid pandemic, in February 2022 he conducted another P'n'O concert with Rick in Györ, Hungary. In February 2023 he conducted the ECC in more prog rock concerts with Rick Wakeman and the English Rock Ensemble at The London Palladium

Protheroe was lyricist, arranger, musical director, and vocal soloist on Eric Lévi's score to the French smash-hit comedy film Les Visiteurs (1993) and also on the album Era (1996) with over 6 million sales in mainland Europe and South America. (Protheroe is also the male vocal soloist, double-tracked, lyricist and conductor on the track Ameno from Era.) The more recent Era 2, Era 3: The Mass and Era 4: Reborn have all reached high chart positions internationally; Era 5: Classics was released in November 2009; Era 6: Classics 2 in October 2010; and Era 7: 7 Seconds in 2017. Another Era album was released in 2013 entitled Arielle Dombasle By Era. The project to date has sold nearly 15 million albums. All were recorded in Abbey Road Studios and Air Studios in London, and also in Paris. In June 2012 he conducted two large-scale concerts of Era in Moscow and also was guest conductor in an Era concert in Menorca, and further performances took place in December 2013 in the Kremlin, Moscow and Saint Petersburg. In September 2017 he was a special guest at an Era concert in Bergen, Norway, which featured a chorus of 150 singers. In March 2022 he recorded new tracks in Abbey Road Studios for the 10th album in the Era series. Also he re-recorded his solos for the track Ameno in Era 1 (1976). After hundreds of remixes and covers of this track over the intervening years, at the beginning of 2022 the track appeared in a Nigerian remix entitled Ameno Amapiano on TikTok, with 10 billion views: the biggest ever on TikTok. More remixes are still appearing and also covers: the track is a huge meme in Africa. Other uses in 2023 include another major meme, for the Italian star football striker Victor Osimhen - more each week! An 11th Era album is in the planning stage.

In recent years, Protheroe has been chorus master for many feature films, including Titus, Bless The Child, The Count of Monte Cristo, Reign of Fire, Gangs of New York, Johnny English, Sky Captain and the World of Tomorrow, The SpongeBob SquarePants Movie, and for the Spielberg/Hanks television series Band of Brothers. In January 2016 he conducted music for Les Visiteurs 3: La Révolution in Prague with the Czech National Symphony Orchestra and Chorus. In March 2016 he returned to Prague to conduct the City of Prague Philharmonic Orchestra in arrangements he wrote for the UK band Penguin Café. In March 2017 he was chorus master for the 50th Anniversary Concert of Procol Harum at the Royal Festival Hall; the following day he conducted a re-recording of Black Sabbath's Supertzar – he conducted the original recording with Black Sabbath in February 1975 (for the album Sabotage). He has also recently been chorus master for "live music to screen" performances in the Royal Albert Hall, including of Gladiator in 2016, in 2017 six performances of Harry Potter and the Philosopher’s Stone, Michael Giacchino at 50 and Beauty and the Beast; and in 2018 Harry Potter 2 and 3, Close Encounters of the Third Kind, Gladiator again and also A Hollywood Christmas. In December 2021 he chorus-mastered another live music to screen event in the RAH: The Muppet Christmas Carol. In 2022 he chorus-mastered in the RAH Harry Potter and the Half Blood Prince, and also showing of "Home Alone" around the UK. "Harry Potter and the Deathly Hallows: Part 1" is due for later 2023. He has composed, arranged and conducted music for many commercials, and in spring 2014 he was featured on screen in the Three Mobile 0800 Singing Dictionary TV adverts shown on all commercial channels filmed in Wookey Hole Caves, directing a chorus of 80 professional singers in bizarre verbal definitions. He has also conducted choruses for Arsenal Football Club, for a television commercial and also for a Club electronic Christmas card, directing from the corner flag!

== The Greek and Eastern Mediterranean Connection ==
In addition to Xenakis, Lina Lalandi had also introduced Protheroe and Ann to the work of the Greek Byzantine Choir, under its director Lycourgos Angelopoulos. As it happens, one of their tutors at Oxford had been the Viennese musicologist Egon Wellesz who, at that time, was the foremost scholar to transcribe and document early Byzantine chant (i.e. the chant preserved in the Orthodox church, as opposed to the various strands like Gregorian chant which were developed in the Roman Catholic church in Western Europe). And it was a chance connection following a Rick Wakeman recording that introduced to Protheroe working closely with Vangelis. So by the mid-1980s he was involved with music stemming from Greece that was both ancient and modern. And around this time other composers, notably John Tavener in England and Christos Hatzis in Canada, were beginning to write music inspired by the Byzantine tradition. This led to a close association with the performance of music from the Eastern Mediterranean, not only from Greece itself but also from the Jewish tradition and that of the Magreb. Protheroe has not only conducted, performed and recorded music from all these traditions, but also instigated and directed a number of festivals and concert series in London (see Project Direction below) and participated in a European Union project 'Medimuses' which set out to document the performing traditions of the Magreb in partnership with several partner organisations, including Écume (Échanges Culturels en Mediterranée) in Marseilles, for whom he also conducted Purcell's opera Dido and Aeneas in Tunis (ancient Carthage) with cast and musicians all drawn from around the Mediterranean, the first opera to have been produced in Tunisia for 85 years. He has collaborated with Cappella Romana, the US vocal ensemble based in Portland, Oregon and Seattle directed by Alexander Lingas, which also pioneers contemporary works related to the Byzantine tradition. In September 2010 he conducted the opening concerts of its season in Portland and Seattle, and members of CR have joined with the English Chamber Choir for recordings and performances in London, notably at the 21st International Congress of Byzantine Studies held at King's College London in 2006.

== Guest conducting ==
Protheroe has conducted in many countries in Europe, Russia, the US and South America in concerts, broadcasts and recordings with orchestras, choruses and ensembles including such diverse groups as

- the Xenakis Ensemble in Holland (for several years as Guest Conductor),
- Academy of Ancient Music,
- Royal Philharmonic Orchestra,
- Ulster Orchestra,
- Orion Orchestra,
- Orchestra Europa,
- City of Santiago Symphony Orchestra and Chorus (Chile),
- Colours Symphony Orchestra and Chorus (Chile),
- Rosario Chamber Orchestra and Chorus (Argentina),
- Orchestra and Chorus of the Teatro Colón (Buenos Aires),
- Buenos Aires Symphony Orchestra and Chorus,
- Ensamble Coral (Buenos Aires),
- Symphony Orchestra and Chorus of the National University of San Juan (Argentina),
- Orquestra Unisinos Anchieta and Coral Porto Alegre (Brazil),
- Orchestra e Coro della Svizzera Italiana (Orchestra and Chorus of Italian Switzerland),
- Czech National Symphony Orchestra,
- City of Prague Philharmonic Orchestra,
- Kühn Choir (Prague),
- Moravian Philharmonic Orchestra with Zerotin Academic Choir (Olomoucs) and the Chorus of Brno National Opera,
- Symphony Orchestra of Płock and Vox Juventutis (Poland),
- Symphony Orchestra and Chorus (drawn from several professional groups) in Kyiv (Ukraine),
- Györ Philharmonic Orchestra (Hungary) and the Budapest Festival Chorus,
- The Academic Big Concert Orchestra of Y. Silantiev (Moscow),

Grand Choir:

- Masters of Choral Singing (Moscow), Moscow City Orchestra – Russian Philharmonic,
- Victor Popov Academy of Choral Art (Moscow),
- Academic Choir of the Saint-Petersburg State Electrotechnical University (LETI),
- Ensemble Écume (Marseille),
- BBC Singers,
- Royal Choral Society,
- Chelsea Opera Group,
- Academic Choir of the Saint-Petersburg State Electrotechnical University (LETI),
- Greek State Opera Chorus,
- Band of the Royal Engineers and most of the Guards Bands.

International classical engagements include conducting Purcell's Dido and Aeneas in Tunis (Carthage) in 2002 for a European Union-supported project with cast and musicians all drawn from around the Mediterranean, the first opera to have been produced in Tunisia for 85 years. In September 2010 he conducted the opening concerts of the season with the US early-music choir Cappella Romana in a programme of 15th/16th century English music) in Portland, Oregon and Seattle, Washington, and in November 2018 he conducted with Cappella Romana two Centenary of the Armistice concerts, again in Portland and Seattle.

== Singing ==
While a music scholar at Magdalen College, Oxford, Protheroe also sang as a counter-tenor (alto) Lay Clerk at New College, Oxford, where he took over from one of the best-known counter-tenors of his generation, James Bowman. On moving to London he sang with a number of prominent freelance choirs including the Monteverdi Choir under John Eliot Gardiner and the Schütz Choir with Roger Norrington, and was a member of the Choir of St Bride's Church, Fleet Street. After a few years, he switched to singing baritone and from 1993 to April 2015 was a member of the Chapel Choir of the Royal Hospital, Chelsea (home of the Chelsea Pensioners), taking over his position from the leading baritone Roderick Williams. His voice is however probably best known from tracks on the French international hit Era albums, notably Ameno (in which he is featured double-tracked, and is singing his own lyrics). This track has been used internationally in many different media and is especially familiar to many millions throughout Europe and South America, and uses range from television commercials to computer games, and even wrestling and martial arts. Cover versions include a highly successful recording by the Red Army Choir of Russia. Protheroe's voice has also featured as that of a monk singing chant on the film soundtracks of 1492: Conquest of Paradise, Les Visiteurs and Nostradamus – which has led to him being described as ‘the monk without the tonsure’.

== Project direction ==
Protheroe has directed and originated a number of artistic projects and series, reflecting his diverse interests in the arts as a whole. These range from anniversary celebrations in words and music of literary figures such as T.S. Eliot, W.B. Yeats and Gerard Manley Hopkins to a retrospective at the Almeida Festival of the Italian avant-garde composer Sylvano Bussotti. He has long been involved in Greek music and culture. He was artistic director of the 1989 Greek Festival in London – a large-scale celebration of Greek culture past and present involving music, poetry, film and architecture in 50 events, based at London's South Bank Centre – and in 1990 a shorter festival devoted to Byzantine music. He also co-directed the Byzantine Festival in London held in March 1998, which presented all aspects of Byzantine culture, from literature and music to health care and cookery. The Festival included a major concert at St Paul's Cathedral in the presence of the Prince of Wales, the Syrian Patriarch of Antioch and the Greek Patriarch of Alexandria (the first time the heads of these Churches in schism from each other had met for over 1,500 years) and Archbishops from several countries. The Byzantine Festival also presented events in Plovdiv, Bulgaria in June 1999 as part of Greece's contribution to European Cultural Month there, and in April 2000 at the Megaron Concert Halls in Athens. Another major Byzantine Festival was presented in London in March 2004, including another Royal Concert in St Paul's Cathedral in which Protheroe conducted the world première of Christos Hatzis's Troparion of Kassiani. He was, for the Byzantine Festival, on the Steering Committee of MediMuses, a three-year international project run from Greece and funded by the European Commission researching and promoting the history and performance of the modal music (maqam) of the Eastern and South Mediterranean. In this connection in February 2005 he hosted a unique international seminar on The Mediterranean Voice in London with many leading performers and recording artists from the Middle East and North Africa, and a major concert of ensembles from Beirut and Thessaloniki. In August 2006 he was music adviser to the 21st International Congress of Byzantine Studies (held in London and attended by over 1,000 Byzantine scholars), directing and conducting concerts and recordings.

== Writing and speaking ==
Protheroe has contributed to many journals and books, including The Listener, Musical Times, Music and Musicians, Tempo, Viking/Penguin Opera Guide, British Music Now, The Artist, The Expert, The Lawyer, Cambridge Papers in Modern Greek, to the European Broadcasting Union and festivals worldwide. He has appeared as a guest lecturer at a number of leading universities, including Cambridge, London, Cardiff and St Andrew's, and for other professional organisations, has been interviewed on many radio and television programmes, and has been guest dinner speaker for institutions including Lincoln's Inn.

In 1974 Protheroe was recruited by the BBC as a scriptwriter for Radio 3. From 1977 to 1985 he was Music Presentation Editor, then Music Information Editor, for the BBC with editorial responsibility for the BBC's written and spoken information concerning classical music and musicology, and commissioning editor for BBC printed material relating to classical music. He was also BBC representative to conferences of the European Broadcasting Union, the US Music Personnel (public radio) and the US Concert Music Broadcasters (commercial radio).

== Forensic musicology ==
Since appearing as expert witness in the Vangelis Chariots of Fire High Court case in 1987, Protheroe has been constantly engaged as a musicologist by international recording artists and composers, record companies, music publishers, music production companies, advertising agencies, collection societies and legal firms. He is consulted on matters of copyright in music and lyrics (plagiarism, breach of contract, libel, claims of co-authorship and unlicensed reproduction and adaptation, copyright in arrangements) and also of copyright in sound recordings (piracy, electronic adaptation and sampling etc.). He has been consulted on around 1,000 claims of plagiarism and other copyright matters and over 3,000 investigations of piracy and sampling, the latter mainly for the IFPI (International Federation of the Phonographic Industry). He has provided opinions on many aspects of copyright, such as definition of “classical music” to the Performing Right Society and definition of “segue” in broadcasts to Phonographic Performance Limited. His High Court appearances include as expert in the Spandau Ballet case (1999), as expert for The Sunday Times in the libel case over the authorship of The James Bond Theme (2001), and in the Young At Heart case (co-authorship arising from the input of a session player, 2002). In October 2002 he was the first Single Joint Expert in music in the Malmstedt/Roxette case. In 1999 he provided evidence in the Macarena case regarding “substantiality” in a sample – the only sampling case yet to reach the UK courts and which resulted in a settlement. In 2004 he appeared as expert in Lionel Sawkins -v- Hyperion Records (a landmark case concerning when copyright arises in editions of historical music); in Mark Taylor -v- Rive Droite Music (when is a musical work complete); and in the Patents County Court in Locksley Brown -v- Mcasso Music Production Ltd (originality in rap lyrics). In 2008 he was Single Joint Expert in the Busted case, and also in 2008 was engaged by ITV Productions as Consultant Musicologist to the new karaoke game-show Who Dares, Sings!. In autumn 2011 he provided evidence for Lady Gaga in the successful injunction against Mind Candy's Lady Goo Goo (infringement of trade mark). He has given expert opinions to a variety of parties involved in most of the major copyright cases in the last 35 years, and has also provided opinions regarding “sonic trade marks” in a number of international cases. He has been dubbed by Capital Radio “the rock music trouble-shooter who sorts out the musicians from the thieves”, has been featured on Radio 4's Law In Action regarding his expertise, has lectured at several universities and colleges and has authored a number of published articles. In July 2015 he was a panel member at a Music Copyright Roundtable run jointly by the Law School of the University of Birmingham and the University of Illinois. Most recently, in March 2023, he gave a lecture on forensic musicology at the University of Birmingham. In October 2016 he was featured in an article on forensic musicology in the New York Times.

In November 2022 he appeared as expert in a copyright case in the Court of Appeal in Oslo, Norway, by video link, and is involved as expert in several ongoing cases in five continents. He is author of a major chapter on his experience as a forensic musicologist and expert witness in court for a forthcoming international publication: "Music Borrowing And Copyright Law" https://www.bloomsbury.com/uk/music-borrowing-and-copyright-law-9781509949403/, being published in October 2023.

== Professional memberships etc. ==
Protheroe is a member of the Academy of Experts, BASCA (the British Academy of Composers, Songwriters and Authors), PRS (Performing Right Society), MCPS (Mechanical Copyright Protection Society), PPL (Phonographic Performance Limited), SACEM (Société des Auteurs, Compositeurs et Éditeurs de Musique, France), SDRM (Société pour l'Administration du Droit de Reproduction Mécanique des Auteurs, Compositeurs et Éditeurs, France) and the Musicians' Union. He was for many years a member of the Artistic Committee, and then the Advisory Committee, of the Park Lane Group, a major UK promoter of contemporary music.

== Family and personal interests ==
Protheroe is married to Ann Manly, whom he met at Oxford, who is a musician, singer, arranger, writer and manager. He has two children: Lucy and Jonathan (Jonny), both of whom work in media. Lucy is creative manager of the music group Penguin Café, and Jonny is Head of Privacy Insights for Europe at Google.

Guy and Ann live in Hampstead, London, in Provence, France, and in Lindos, Rhodes, Greece. Their enthusiasms include Arsenal Football Club – for whom Protheroe was featured on television conducting a chorus for the ESPN Premiership coverage of Arsenal matches, and also conducting a chorus on the pitch for the Arsenal Football Club electronic Christmas Card in 2012.
