= Ivan Moody (composer) =

British composer (1964–2024)

Ivan Moody (11 June 1964 in London – 18 January 2024 in Lisbon) was a British composer and musicologist.

Moody was active as a conductor, having directed ensembles such as Voces Angelicae, the Kastalsky Chamber Choir (United Kingdom), Capilla Peña Florida (Spain), Cappella Romana (United States), the Choir of the Cathedral of St George, Novi Sad (Serbia), the KotorArt Festival Choir (Montenegro), the Orthodox Choir of the University of Joensuu (Finland) and Ensemble Alpha (Portugal); and as a widely published musicologist. His research interests included the music of Eastern Europe, especially 20th century and contemporary music from Russia and the Balkans, the music of the Orthodox Church in the modern era, music and spirituality, music as theology, Serbian church music, the aesthetics of Modernism and Postmodernism and their intersection with Orthodox church music and the musical culture of the Mediterranean.

Ivan Moody's music is recorded on the Hyperion, ECM, Sony, Challenge, Telarc, Gothic, Oehms, Orange Mountain, Linn and Cappella Romana labels.

== Early life ==
Ivan Moody was born in London on 11 June 1964. He studied composition at Royal Holloway College, in London and privately with John Tavener; he took his doctorate in the University of York. He also studied Eastern Orthodox Theology at the University of Joensuu in Finland.

== Work from the 1980s and 1990s ==
Moody's compositions show the influences of Eastern liturgical chant and the Eastern Orthodox Church, of which he was a member (He converted to Orthodoxy in 1988, being received in the Russian Cathedral in London. Ivan worked very hard to help creating an Orthodox Church with regular Liturgies in Lisbon, Portugal, where he was living, for there was no regular service and with the opening of the borders and the migration of lots of eastern orthodox people to Portugal in the 90s made it even more necessary. He was ordained Priest by the Ecumenical Patriarchate of Constantinople in 2004, later becoming a protopresbyter of the Ecumenical Patriarchate. He was transferred to the Serbian Orthodox Church in 2022. His Canticum Canticorum I, written for the Hilliard Ensemble and premiered in 1987, achieved enormous success and remains his most frequently-performed work, and in 1990 he won the Arts for the Earth Festival Prize for Prayer for the Forests, subsequently premièred by the renowned Tapiola Choir of Finland. One of his most important works is the oratorio Passion and Resurrection (1992), based on Orthodox liturgical texts, premièred in 1993 by Red Byrd and the Estonian Philharmonic Chamber Choir under Tõnu Kaljuste at the Tampere Festival. In 1996 it was given its North American premiere by Cappella Romana. The Akáthistos Hymn (1998), the composer's largest work to date, and the first complete musical setting of this text, was written for Cappella Romana following these performances.

Other significant works include the 'cello concerto Epitaphios (1993), the cantata Revelation (1995), Endechas y Canciones (1996), the recorder concerto Pnevma (1998), Lamentations of the Myrrhbearer (2001) for string quartet, Lumière sans déclin (2000) for string orchestra, and the choral triptych written for Trio Mediaeval - Words of the Angel (1998), Troparion of Kassiani (1999), A Lion's Sleep (2002), and Chalice of Wisdom, using a text from Matins of the Feast of St Thomas, written in 2002 for the ensemble amarcord.

== Work from the 2000s ==
Later compositions include a large-scale BBC commission, The Dormition of the Virgin (2003), concertos for double-bass (The Morning Star, 2003), piano (Linnunlaulu, 2003) and bassoon (Arise, 2004), Passione Popolare, built on popular religious texts from Magna Graecia and premièred at the Antidogma Festival in Italy in June 2005, and Ossetian Requiem, written for the Amsterdam-based 'Cello Octet Conjunto Ibérico. In 2008, he completed a new work for the King's Singers, "Canti della Rosa" and a large-scale setting of the Stabat Mater, incorporating texts from the Byzantine liturgy and by Anna Akhmatova, for the Oslo International Festival of Church Music. His 2009 Hymn to St Nicholas for eight voices was commissioned for the KotorArt Festival in Montenegro, where it was premiered under the composer's direction, and received its American premiere in November of that year.

Works completed in 2010 include Canticum Canticorum IV, a commission from Seattle Pro Musica, Angelus Domini descendit, a commission from the Choir of Royal Holloway, University of London and Sub tuum praesidium, a commission from the English Chamber Choir. 2011 saw the completion of a sequence of music for Byzantine-rite vespers for the Children's Choir of St Vladimir's Orthodox Theological Seminary in New York and Ode 8 of the Paschal Canon, part of a multi-composer work commissioned by Cappella Romana. Recently completed works include "Simeron", for the Goeyvaerts Trio, recorded on Challenge CC72616), "Keskiyö" for two harpsichords, "Shoreline" for two pianos, "Dragonfly", a bass clarinet concerto for Luís Gomes and the Grupo de Música Contemporânea de Lisboa, "Fioriture" for American pianist Paul Barnes (recorded on Orange Mountain OMM0107), "Qohelet" for the Italian ensemble De Labyrinto, the "Dante Trilogy" for choir and ensemble, and "O Isplendor", in memory of John Tavener, for Cappella Nova, recorded on Linn Records CKD 539.

In October 2014 he was in residence at Biola University in Southern California, where he gave a series of masterclasses and lectures. The concluding monographic concert ended with the world premiere of "Cielo della Luna", the third part of the "Dante Trilogy", commissioned by the Biola Conservatory of Music. The first part of the Trilogy, "O Luce Etterna", was a commission from the Alcobaça Festival for the Capela Musical Cupertino de Miranda, and the second, "Oltre la Spera", was written for the Grupo de Música Contemporânea de Lisboa and the Grupo Musical Olisipo and first performed, as was the bass clarinet concerto "Dragonfly", at the composer's 50th Birthday concert at the Palácio Foz in Lisbon on 27 June 2014. In 2016 was Composer in Residence at the Stimmwercktage in Adlersberg, Germany.

== Later work (2016–2024) ==
Later works include "Los Espejos de Velázquez" for the pianist Artur Pizarro (premiered in Vila Nova de Gaia in July 2016), "Paris, 7 am" (soprano and piano quintet) for soprano Suzie LeBlanc (premiered by Suzie LeBlanc and the Blue Engine, Robert Korgaard and the Blue Engine Quartet, Toronto, December 2016), "Le Vergine" for Stimmwerck (premiered at the Stimmwercktage, Adlersberg, June 2016), "Vespers Sequence" for New York Polyphony, premiered at St Mary the Virgin, New York, January 2017), "Psalm Antiphon", using the same scoring as Stravinsky's "Symphony of Psalms", commissioned by the Chamber Choir of Lisbon University and premiered on 13 July 2017 in Lisbon, "Psalm 1" and "Antiphon for Psalm 1", commissioned for Singer Pur and the Regensburger Domspatz and "Amorphous Metal" for the Trio Entremadeiras, premiered in Guarda, 9 February 2018. Works completed between 2018 and 2020 include "Isangele" for the English Chamber Choir, premiered at the Patmos Festival in August 2018, three motets on texts from the Codex Las Huelgas and the Byzantine rite for Trio Mediaeval, premiered in Oslo in October 2018, "Taninim" for tuba and piano, premiered by Sofia Moody and Pedro Vieira de Almeida at the Gravissimo Festival in Alcobaça in August 2019, the large-scale oratorio "Stephans-Weihnacht", commissioned by Singer Pur and St Stephen's Church, Therwil (premiered in December 2019), "Transfiguration", premiered by Voces8 and Intrada in Moscow in January 2020, and "Piano Book", comprising seventeen pieces for different pianists (2020), and "Bird in Space" (2020) for the saxophonist Amy Dickson.

== Academic profile ==
As of 1990, Moody lived near Lisbon, Portugal, where he was until 1998 Professor of Composition at the Academia de Artes e Tecnologias, Lisbon. He was involved in the construction of a database for the Portuguese Contemporary Music Centre (), was a Research Fellow of the CESEM research unit at the Universidade Nova in Lisbon 2010–2012 ( and again from 2015, and was Professor of Church Music of the Department of Orthodox Theology at the University of Eastern Finland () from 2013-2014. In 2005 he was elected the first Chairman of the International Society for Orthodox Church Music (ISOCM). His book "Modernism and Orthodox Spirituality in Contemporary Music" was published in 2014 by ISOCM/SASA.

== Personal life ==
Ivan Moody was married to contralto and viola da gamba performer Susana Moody, member of the São Carlos National Theater Choir, father of Sebastian Moody, trombonist Bárbara Moody and tuba player Sofia Moody

Moody died on 18 January 2024, at the age of 59.

== Partial list of works ==
- 1982: "Three Poems of Anna Akhmatova", for soprano or tenor and string sextet
- 1985: Canticum Canticorum I, for vocal ensemble
- 1987: "Canticle of the Mother of God", for choir
- 1988: "Hymn of the Transfiguration", for choir
- 1988 "Miserere", for choir
- 1990: Prayer for the Forests, for choir
- 1992: Passion and Resurrection, oratorio, for soloists, choir and ensemble
- 1992: Vigil of the Angels for viola and string orchestra
- 1993: Epitaphios, concerto for cello
- 1995: Revelation, cantata, for choir and ensemble
- 1996: Endechas y Canciones, for vocal ensemble
- 1996: Klama for viola and double bass
- 1998: The Akathistos Hymn, for choir
- 1998: Pnevma, concerto for recorder
- 1998: Words of the Angel, for choir
- 1999: Troparion of Kassiani, for choir
- 2000: Lumière sans déclin, for string orchestra
- 2001: Lamentations of the Myrrhbearers, for string quartet
- 2002: A Lion's Sleep, for choir
- 2002: Chalice of Wisdom for choir
- 2003: The Dormition of the Virgin, cantata for soloists, choir and ensemble
- 2003: The Morning Star, concerto for double-bass
- 2003: Linnunlaulu, concerto for piano
- 2004: Arise, concerto for bassoon
- 2005: Passione Popolare, for soloists, choir and ensemble
- 2009: Hymn to Saint Nicholas, for choir
- 2010: "Canticum Canticorum IV", for choir
- 2010: "Sub tuum praesidium", for choir
- 2011: "Vespers", for upper voices
- 2012: "The Paschal Canon: Ode VIII", for choir
- 2012: "Te lucis ante terminum", for choir
- 2012: "Noć Prekrasna", for choir
- 2012: "Simeron", for vocal trio and string trio
- 2012: "Shoreline", for two pianos
- 2013: "Keskiyö", for two harpsichords
- 2013: "Dragonfly", for solo bass clarinet and ensemble
- 2013: "Fioriture", for solo piano
- 2014: "Liturgy of St John Chrysostom no. 2 (Greek Liturgy)", for choir
- 2014: "O Luce Etterna (Dante Trilogy Part I)"
- 2014: "Oltre la Spera (Dante Trilogy Part II)"
- 2014: "Cielo della Luna (Dante Trilogy Part III)"
- 2015: "The Descent of the Dove", for violin, cello and piano
- 2015: "Uspomena" for two tubas and piano
- 2015: "...grace upon her heart..." for choir
- 2015: "Los Espejos de Velázquez" for piano
- 2016: "Paris, 7 a.m." for soprano and piano quartet
- 2016: "Albor" for harpsichord and recorder quartet
- 2016: "Le Vergine" for vocal consort and viol consort
- 2016: "Vespers Sequence" for vocal ensemble
- 2016: "Iterazioni", concerto for marimba
- 2017: "Psalm Antiphon" for choir and orchestra
- 2017: "Psalm 1" for choir
- 2017: "Antiphon for Psalm 1" for choir
- 2017: "Perchoresis" for flute trio
- 2017: "Amorphous Metal" for wind trio
- 2017: "Exaposteilarion for Theophany" for choir
- 2018: "Isangele (John on Patmos)" for choir
- 2018: "Three Motets (Ave Maris Stella; O Maria Maris Stella/Ti Theotoko; Resurgentis/Dhefte lavete/Christos anesti) for vocal ensemble
- 2018: "Tanninim" for tuba and piano
- 2018: "Transfiguration" for vocal ensemble and choir
- 2019: "Imperaytriz de la Ciutat Joyosa" for organetto
- 2019: "O Angels and Archangels" for soprano, cornetto and bass viol
- 2019: "Stephans-Weihnacht" for soloists, choir and ensemble
- 2020: "Piano Book" for piano
- 2020: "Wingtip Vortex" for flute
- 2020: "Civitas Sancti" for vocal ensemble
- 2020: "Bird in Space" for soprano saxophone
- 2021: "And no birds sing/Opsometha phos" for piano
- 2021: "Concierto Narrativo" for soprano saxophone and strings
- 2021: "Dromoi" for flute and piano
- 2022: "Byzantine Requiem" for chamber choir
- 2022: "Tre Notturni" for baryton trio
- 2022: "Cavafy Songs" for countertenor and piano
- 2023: "Evangelismos" for choir
- 2023: "Anasta" for contralto, violin and bass clarinet
- 2023: "Quartet of Life" for contralto, clarinet, violin and double-bass
- 2023: "Babbu nostru" for choir

== Selected recordings ==
- Aflame, He Who clothed Himself with Light, Moons and Suns NDR Choir, Raschèr Saxophone Quartet C2 Hamburg Es Dur ES 2081
- Akáthistos Hymn Cappella Romana CR418-2CD
- A Lion's Sleep ECM New Series 1869
- Apokathilosis Raumklang Rkap 10117
- Canticum Canticorum I ECM New Series 1614/15
- Canticum Canticorum I Atma Classique ACD2 2284
- Chalice of Wisdom CD "Prinos euharistic", Theological Faculty, Iași
- Endechas y Canciones ECM New Series 1614/15
- Fioriture Orange Mountain Music OMM 0107
- Imperaytriz de la ciutat joyosa Consouling Sounds SOUL0139
- Lamentation of the Virgin Oehms Classics OC 354
- Passion & Resurrection Hyperion CDA 66999
- Ravenna Sanctus Warner Classics R2 146364
- Simeron Channel Classics CC 72616
- Supplication for Peace Oehms Classics OC1714
- Te Apostolit Cappella Romana CR 412-CD
- Te lucis ante terminum, He Who clother Himself with Light, The Blessed among Women weeping, Stabat Mater, Funeral Trisagion, Words of the Angel, Meeting in the Garden, Angelus Domini, Ablaze Records AR 00065
- Troparion of Kassiana ECM New Series 1869
- When Augustus Reigned Naxos 9.70039
- Words of the Angel ECM New Series 1753
