= Era (musical project) =

French musical group

Era.

Background information
- Origin: France
- Genre: New-age
- Years active: 1996–present
- Members: Eric Lévi

Era is a new-age music project by French composer Eric Lévi. Some of the lyrics were written by Guy Protheroe in an imaginary language similar to Latin, but deliberately devoid of any exact meaning. Musically, the project features rock, pop and electronic music.

Era’s first album, Era, was released in 1996 and became a worldwide success, helped by its first single, "Ameno". It sold over 6 million copies and became the most exported French album at the time. It was followed by Era 2 in 2000 and The Mass in 2003. In 2008, the project saw a significant departure from its previous themes and presented a more electronic soundscape with Arabic influences in its fourth album, Reborn. In the following two years, Era released Classics and Classics 2, which consisted in contemporary reinterpretations of classical works by Johann Sebastian Bach, Giuseppe Verdi, Antonio Vivaldi, Wolfgang Amadeus Mozart, Ludwig van Beethoven and Pyotr Ilyich Tchaikovsky, amongst others. In 2017, Era released its 7th album named The 7th Sword. In 2022, Era released its first live album named Era The Live Experience recorded during the first round of the Live Experience Tour.

In 2026, the group announced a national tour entitled The Ameno Tour, including a concert at the Accor Arena in Paris.

== Style ==
"Ameno"
A 22-second sample of "Ameno" demonstrating the pseudo-Latin lyrics with electronic music arrangements.

Era's music features original music written by Eric Lévi, his influences come from hard rock music of the 70's and classical music, with a mix of electric guitars and strong vocal melodies.

Era's live shows, music videos and artwork take Era's audience into the world of Medieval Heroic Fantasy.

== Language ==
Most Era songs are sung in an imaginary language inspired by Latin, but with no intended meaning, while others are in actual Latin. Some songs have English lyrics, such as "Mother" and "Looking For Something", or Arabic lyrics, such as "7 Seconds".

== Use of Era's music ==
- Eric Lévi composed the soundtrack for the French comedy film Les Visiteurs (1993) and Les Visiteurs II (1998). The film score would later become part of an Era album.
- The song "Divano" was part of the soundtrack of the Brazilian soap opera Um Anjo Caiu do Céu (2001). Also used as 2000 Kia Optima commercial in South Korea.
- The song "I Believe" was recorded as a duet by Katherine Jenkins and Andrea Bocelli. It was released on both Jenkins' 2009 album Believe and Bocelli's 2009 album My Christmas.
- Era is famous among mixed martial arts fans due to "Enae Volare Mezzo" being the theme song of Fedor Emelianenko. "Ameno" is used by Fedor's younger brother, Aleksander Emelianenko, and used by Mexican wrestler Myzteziz.
- "Mother" was used in Sylvester Stallone's sports drama Driven.
- The song "Ameno" has, of December 2019, been used in variations of the doge meme.
- The song "Ameno" is used in many TikTok videos joking about the name of X Æ A-Xii, the firstborn child of Elon Musk and Grimes'.
- The song "Divano" is used in Zurcaroh's 2018 performance on America's Got Talent.

== Discography ==
=== Studio and live albums ===
List of albums, with details and chart positions
Title	Year	Peak chart positions									
Title	Year	AUS	BEL (Wa)	BEL (Fl)	FIN	FRA	GER	ITA	NLD	SWE	SWI
Era	1996	53	1	20	1	1	2	52	4	1	2
Era 2	2000	53	2	32	29	2	12	ー	13	8	4
The Mass	2003	ー	5	43	ー	4	53	1	10	10	2
Reborn	2008	ー	10	ー	ー	6	ー	25	ー	ー	18
Era Classics	2009	ー	3	ー	ー	3	ー	14	ー	ー	31
Classics II	2010	ー	10	ー	ー	14	ー	ー	ー	ー	37
The 7th Sword	2017	ー	45	152	ー	42	ー	ー	ー	ー	98
Era The Live Experience	2022	ー	45	ー	ー	84	ー	ー	ー	ー	ー

=== Compilation albums ===
List of albums, with details
Title	Year
The Legend	2000
The Very Best of Era	2004
Era The Essential	2010

=== Singles and EPs ===
List of albums, with details
Title	Year
"Ameno"	1996
"Mother"	1997
"Misere Mani"	1998
"Enae Volare Mezzo"	1998
"Infanati"	2000
"Divano"	2000
"Don't U"	2001
"The Mass"	2003
"Looking for Something"	2003
"Don't Go Away"	2003
"Reborn"	2008
"Kilimandjaro"	2008
"Ave Maria"	2013
"7 Seconds"	2017
"Kilimandjaro (Dark Remix)"	2017
"Ameno Metal (The Live Experience)"	2022
"Freedom"	2022
"The Mass (Jesse Bloch Remix)"	2024
"The Fallen King"	2026

=== Double albums ===
List of albums, with details and chart positions
Title	Year	Peak chart positions
Title	Year	FRA
Era & Era 2	2003	102
Reborn & Classics	2010	187
