= Eric Lévi =

French guitarist and composer (born 1955)

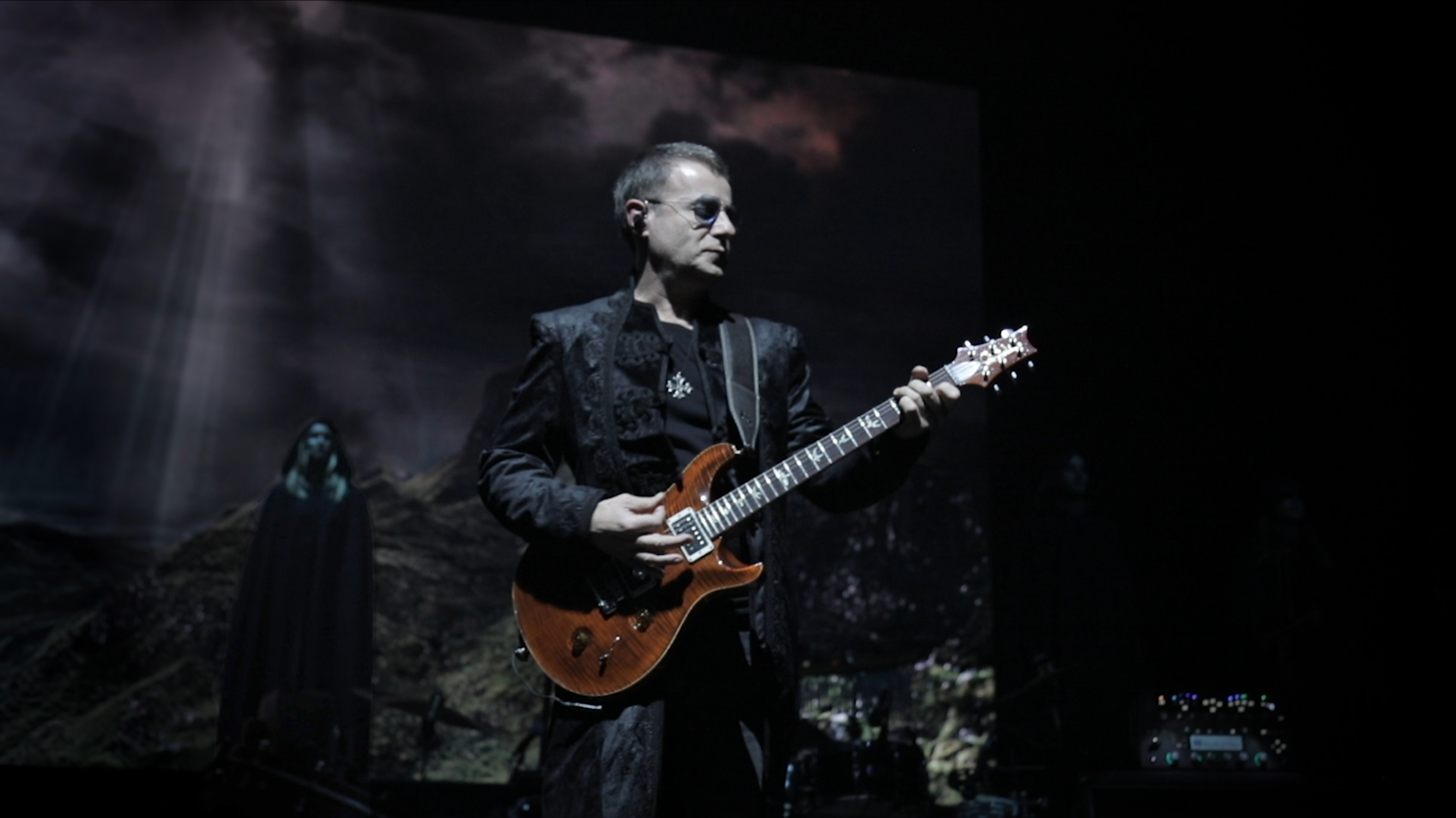
- Lévi performing in 2022

Background information
- Also known as: Eric Jacques Levisalles
- Born: 1955 (age 70–71)
- Origin: France
- Genres: New-age; hard rock
- Occupations: Musician; songwriter; composer
- Instrument: Guitar
- Years active: 1975–present
- Member of: Era
- Formerly of: Shakin' Street

Éric Jacques Levisalles, stage name Eric Lévi (Paris, 1955) is a French rock musician and film composer.

In 1975, Eric Lévi founded the hard rock band Shakin' Street with Fabienne Shine, which would release the two albums Vampire Rock and Solid as a Rock. Shakin'Street played as the opening act of the 1980 "Black And Blue Tour" in the US, featuring Black Sabbath and Blue Oyster Cult, during this tour the band founded by Eric Levi also played with AC/DC, Alice Cooper, Journey (Day on The Green) before disbanding in 1981. Eric Levi then moved to New York where he collaborated with Marianne Faithfull, and back to Paris in 1992.

Later on in his career, Eric Lévi wrote the musical score to several films, including L'Opération Corned-Beef, the comedy Les Visiteurs which was an international success and one of the highest-grossing films of all time in France, and La Vengeance d'une Blonde. Levi wrote the end-credit song "People and Places" for La Vengeance d'une Blonde with Philip Bailey and Roxanne Seeman. "People And Places" was recorded by Dee Dee Bridgewater and Philip Bailey for the film soundtrack. It was released as a single and on the soundtrack album as a single, club mix, and instrumental version.

Lévi is best known for the musical project Era, and for inventing the Latin-sounding words of these songs. Era's self-titled debut album in 1997 was commercially successful, becoming the most exported French album with over 6 million copies sold. A sequel, Era 2 was released in 2000, followed by Era: The Mass in 2003. The trilogy is characterized by a mixture of rock, synth, and pseudo-Latin Gregorian chant.
