= Richard Hack =

American screenwriter and author

- Born: March 20, 1951 (age 75)
- Education: Pennsylvania State University
- Occupation: Writer
- Known for: Biographical books and screenplays

Richard Hack (born March 20, 1951) is an American writer best known for his biographical books and screenplays. He is a frequent guest on talk shows and an outspoken critic of bias in television news.

== Background ==
Born in Drexel Hill, Pennsylvania, Hack attended the Lynnewood School, and Haverford High School, on the Main Line in suburban Philadelphia. He later attended Pennsylvania State University and holds a master's degree in Environmental Design.

Hack moved to Los Angeles where he was hired by TV Guide magazine as its West Coast national programming editor. By the early 1980s, Hack began writing the TeleVisions column for the daily entertainment trade paper, The Hollywood Reporter. During the next decade, Hack often appeared on The Tonight Show and Today reporting on Hollywood.

During the same period, he was a frequent guest on Oprah Winfrey, Good Morning America, Larry King Live, Charlie Rose, Tomorrow, Entertainment Tonight, and Access Hollywood.

In 1990, Hack left The Hollywood Reporter to become Vice President of Creative Affairs at Dove Audio and Entertainment, a production company that specialized in miniseries and books-on-tape. While at Dove, Hack adapted Sidney Sheldon’s The Sands of Time, Memories of Midnight, and The Stars Shine Down as mini-series, which he also produced, and wrote his first book, Next to Hughes with Robert Maheu.

Since leaving Dove, Hack moved to a horse ranch in Maui, where he stabled polo ponies, and established a home on the Intracoastal in Florida.

His bestseller Hughes: The Private Diaries, Memos and Letters, a memoir on billionaire Howard Hughes, was released on September 11, 2001. Hack was being interviewed live on the Today show by Matt Lauer when the first plane crashed into the World Trade Center, and Lauer consequently had to cut their interview short to report on the ongoing events. The abrupt ending of their interview and the early reports of the attack from the Today show, is shown in a continuous loop, as part of an exhibit in the National September 11 Memorial & Museum in New York City.

His subsequent book, PuppetMaster: The Secret Life of J. Edgar Hoover was the basis of the 2011 film J. Edgar, directed by Clint Eastwood.

== Published works ==
- 1991: Scanners II: The New Order (writing as Professor Janus Kimball)
- 1993: Next to Hughes (with Robert Maheu)
- 1994: Richard Hack’s Home Video Companion for Parents
- 1994: Unfinished Lives
- 1995: LoveMates: An Astrological Guide to Romance
- 1995: The Dinosaur Who Wouldn't Brush His Teeth (writing as Dr. Dandelion)
- 1995: Jackson Family Values (with Margaret Maldanado Jackson)
- 1995: Memories of Madison County (with Jana St. James)
- 1996: Waffle the Bear's Amazing Adventure (writing as Dr. Dandelion)
- 1996: Your Life: An Owner’s Manual
- 1997: When Money Is King: How Revlon's Ron Perlman Mastered the World of Finance to Create One of America's Greatest Business Empires, and Found Glamour, Beauty, and the High Life in the Bargain
- 1998: Open House
- 2000: Madness in the Morning: Life and Death in TV's Early Morning Ratings War
- 2001: Hughes: The Private Diaries, Memos and Letters
- 2002: Clash of the Titans: How the Unbridled Ambition of Ted Turner and Rupert Murdoch Has Created Global Empires That Control What We Read and Watch
- 2004: PuppetMaster: The Secret Life of J. Edgar Hoover
- 2009: Duchess of Death: The Unauthorized Biography of Agatha Christie
- 2013: "Baby Boomers' Guide to the Fountain of Youth"
- 2017: "The Lion & the Bluebird: The Peter Bistrian Story"

== The Aviator misattribution ==
It is sometimes stated that Hack's book Hughes served as the basis for Martin Scorsese's 2004 film about Howard Hughes, The Aviator.

However, two competing films about Hughes were in development at the same time. The other film was to have been directed by Christopher Nolan, with star Jim Carrey and financing from Castle Rock Entertainment. Its script was going to be based on Hack's biography. That film was never produced. However, The Aviator star Leonardo DiCaprio has referred to Hack's biography in interviews about the film.
