= Sidney Sheldon's The Tides of Memory =

2013 novel by Tilly Bagshawe

First edition (US) Publ. William Morrow

Sidney Sheldon's The Tides of Memory is a 2013 thriller written by Tilly Bagshawe. Sheldon's family commissioned Bagshawe to write the novel in Sheldon's style.

== Plot summary ==
The Tides of Memory is a thriller that tells the story of Alexia De Vere, an up-and-coming superstar politician of England's conservative party. She enjoys her power as the intelligent and ruthless wife of a rich member of England's upper class, Teddy De Vere. She enjoys using her power, as it gives her the control to and even destroy, lives. Alexia's personal life is fraught with trials. Her daughter Roxie, who uses a wheelchair after a suicide attempt, blames her ruined life on her mother. Bryan's son Michael does not hesitate to risk the family's reputation to start his personal business. Teddy, her devoted husband, is ready to protect Alexia no matter what. Alexia is appointed England's Home Secretary, the second most powerful politician in the country. Her career is threatened by jealous colleagues, protesters, a stalker, Russian oligarchs, and someone who poisoned her dog. Alexia also has a secret from her past involving the drowning of a camper at an upscale summer camp in Kennebunkport, Maine, USA.
