= The Naked Face (film) =

1984 film by Bryan Forbes

- U.S. film poster
- Directed by: Bryan Forbes
- Written by: Bryan Forbes
- Based on: The Naked Face (1970 novel) by Sidney Sheldon
- Produced by: Yoram Globus; Menahem Golan
- Starring: Roger Moore; Rod Steiger; Elliott Gould; Anne Archer; Art Carney
- Cinematography: David Gurfinkel
- Edited by: Philip Shaw
- Music by: Michael J. Lewis
- Production company: Golan-Globus Productions; Northbrook Films
- Distributed by: Cannon Films
- Release dates: June 1985 (Mystfest); June 13, 1984 (U.S.)
- Running time: 103 minutes
- Country: United States
- Language: English

The Naked Face is a 1984 American thriller film written and directed by Bryan Forbes, and starring Roger Moore, Rod Steiger, Elliott Gould, Anne Archer and Art Carney. It is based on Sidney Sheldon's 1970 novel, and follows a psychiatrist (Moore) who is framed for the murder of one of his patients.

The film was released in the United States by Cannon Films on June 13, 1984. It was Forbes' last theatrical film as director before his death in 2013.

== Plot ==
A patient of Chicago psychoanalyst Dr. Judd Stevens is murdered after a session, stabbed while wearing a raincoat belonging to the doctor. Police detectives McGreavy and Angeli investigate. McGreavy bitterly resents the doctor from a previous case in which Stevens' testimony led to a cop killer being institutionalized rather than sent to prison.

The patient's personal problems are in question until Stevens' secretary is also found brutally murdered. Stevens realizes he is the murderer's target, while the two detectives treat him as their prime suspect.

A widower, Stevens expresses concern to his physician brother-in-law about the cops' behavior. McGreavy in particular is so aggressive in his interrogations, Angeli reports him to a superior and gets McGreavy thrown off the case.

Posing as doormen, two gunmen break into Stevens' apartment. He holds them off until the brother-in-law and two paramedics arrive. Not trusting the cops, Stevens instead made an emergency call to the hospital for help.

Choosing a name out of the Yellow Pages at random, Stevens hires an old, quirky private investigator named Morgens who lives in a rundown apartment filled with clocks and cats. Morgens saves his life by finding a bomb planted in Stevens' car. After he reports this latest attempt on his life, Angeli promises to lend Stevens a more sympathetic ear than his partner had. McGreavy, however, has secretly cut a deal with their captain to keep an eye on the case from a distance.

One evening, Morgens phones Stevens and claims to know the killer's true identity, but refuses to reveal it over the phone because nobody can be trusted, not even the police. He tells Stevens to meet him after midnight at the Navy Pier and mentions the name "Don Vinton." But when Stevens and Angeli arrive, they find the murdered body of Morgens, holding a cuckoo clock.

After doing some research, Stevens realizes that Don Vinton is an Italian code name for the head of an organized crime syndicate. Offering to hide Stevens in a safe house, Angeli instead drives him to a countryside mansion where the phony doormen appear. Angeli draws a gun but points it at Stevens, telling him he trusted the wrong cop.

Stevens is taken to a crime boss, discovering that the mobster's wife is Ann Blake, a quiet woman who has been seeing Stevens as a patient. Don Vinton feels he simply can't have anyone knowing his private business, despite the fact that Ann told the psychiatrist practically nothing during their sessions.

Stevens is taken to a warehouse to be done away with permanently. Angeli, expecting a payoff, is killed instead. Stevens tries to escape but is quickly re-captured, then beaten savagely by the crime boss until McGreavy and a team of cops arrive just in time, having been called by Ann. Don Vinton is killed and the rest of his men are arrested.

At a cemetery where Stevens goes to visit his wife's grave once a week, Ann Blake turns up to apologize for causing Stevens all this trouble at the cost of so many lives. He has quit his private practice, so she asks if that means he can see a former patient socially. It does and they begin to leave the cemetery together, but Ann is shot and killed by a mob sniper.

== Cast ==
- Roger Moore as Dr. Judd Stevens
- Rod Steiger as Lieutenant McGreavy
- Elliott Gould as Detective Angeli
- Art Carney as Morgens
- Anne Archer as Ann Blake
- David Hedison as Dr. Peter Hadley
- Deanna Dunagan as Mrs. Hadley
- Ron Parady as Cortini
- Dick Sollenberger as Captain Bertelli
- John Kapelos as Frank
- Jimmie F. Skaggs as Fallon

== Production ==
Though the film was produced and released in 1984, Sidney Sheldon wrote its source novel in 1970, before psychological profiling became a widely accepted method of forensic crime-fighting work.

While the original novel was set in New York City, filming took place on-location in Chicago.

Forbes later said the film's production "was a nightmare from beginning to end."

== Reception ==
In a negative review at the Chicago Tribune, Richard Christiansen wrote "The film has plenty of problems, including harsh lighting and murky photography, but its principal fault is that it has a perfectly dreadful story and absolutely silly dialogue."

The film was nominated for Best Film at the 1984 Mystfest Film Festival in Cattolica, Italy.

== Foreign remakes ==
The film has been remade twice:

- Sheriff's Star (1992), a Ukrainian film directed by Nikolai Litus and starring Irina Alfyorova.
- Kshana Kshana (2007), an Indian Kannada-language film directed by Sunil Kumar Desai and starring Aditya.
