= If Tomorrow Comes =

If Tomorrow Comes may refer to:

- If Tomorrow Comes (film), a 1971 American TV film
- If Tomorrow Comes (novel), a 1985 novel by Sidney Sheldon
- If Tomorrow Comes (miniseries), a 1986 miniseries based on the novel
- If Tomorrow Comes (TV series), a 2011–2012 South Korean series
- If Tomorrow Comes..., a 2009 album by Maino
