= Master of the Game (novel) =

1982 American novel by Sidney Sheldon

- 1982 1st edition cover
- Author: Sidney Sheldon
- Language: English
- Genre: Thriller novel
- Publisher: Warner Books
- Publication date: 1982
- Publication place: United States
- Media type: Print (Paperback and Hardback)
- ISBN: 0-688-01365-1
- Preceded by: Rage of Angels
- Followed by: If Tomorrow Comes

Master of the Game is a novel by Sidney Sheldon, first published in hardback format in 1982. Spanning four generations in the lives of the fictional McGregor/Blackwell family, the critically acclaimed novel spent four weeks at number one on The New York Times Best Seller list, and was later adapted into a 1984 television miniseries.

On August 4, 2009 (two years after Sheldon's death), William Morrow and Company released a sequel, Sidney Sheldon's Mistress of the Game, written by Tilly Bagshawe.

== Publication history ==
Master of the Game has been translated into numerous languages, and reprinted seven times. It was originally published by William Morrow & Co. in 1982. In 1983, the book was reprinted four times: in January, by HarperCollins, in June by Thorndike Pr., in paperback format by Warner Books in August, and by Pan Books in December. The novel was re-released by Warner Books in 1988. In 1993, Master Of The Game was part of an omnibus edition by a publishing company named Diamond Books, which was owned by HarperCollins Publishers. The other two books in the omnibus were Bloodline (1977) and Rage of Angels (1980), both major bestsellers by Sheldon. The most recent version of the book was printed in April 2005 by HarperCollins Ltd.

An abridged audiobook of the novel was published on cassette in 1988 by Dove Books on Tape, featuring Roddy McDowall as the narrator. An unabridged audiobook was published in 2009 on CD by Phoenix Books, featuring Shannon Engemann as the narrator, and made available in 2016 on Audible digital download and iTunes digital download.

== Plot ==
Kate Blackwell, matriarch of the Blackwell family and head of multinational business empire Kruger-Brent Int., celebrates her 90th birthday. She sees the ghosts of her past but refuses to join them until a member of the family is ready to take over. The novel revolves around four generations of the empire's rise and Kate's dedication to the conglomerate.

Kate's father, Jamie McGregor, leaves Scotland for Klipdrift, South Africa to find his fortune in the growing diamond trade of the 1860s. He is swindled and left for dead by merchant Salomon van der Merwe but is saved by Banda, van der Merwe's servant, and they steal millions' worth of diamonds in a dangerous heist. An unrecognizable Jamie returns to Klipdrift under a new name and impregnates Margaret, van der Merwe's daughter, for revenge, revealing his true identity to everyone after announcing the unwed Margaret's pregnancy to the supposedly moral and religious town, shaming the very religious van der Merwe. Jamie's wealth and business helps the town thrive. Jamie secretly takes control of the local bank and ruins van der Merwe financially, driving the latter to kill himself. Margaret gives birth to a son, and after leaving the baby on Jamie's doorstep after trying to reconnect with him, Jamie grows to love Jamie Jr. and agrees to marry Margaret to keep Jamie Jr. close to him. One night Jamie drunkenly mistakes his wife for his mistress, which results in Kate's birth. During the Bantu rebellion, Banda kidnaps Kate before rebels can take her, but Jamie Jr. is kidnapped and left to die in the desert. News of this causes Jamie to have a stroke, leaving him helpless in the care of Margaret, who runs Kruger-Brent with Jamie's right-hand man, David Blackwell. While captured during the Boer War, Kate realizes the need for power so she will never feel helpless again.

Kate grows up stubborn and obsessively in love with David, who is about 20 years older, but after her mother's death becomes serious about running the company and goes to business school. Upon her return, she learns of David's engagement to a woman whose family wants him to leave Kruger-Brent and run their company. Kate manipulates David into breaking off his engagement and eventually they marry. During World War I, Kate sees an opportunity to manufacture weapons. David is against it and stops her, but when he enlists for the war, she starts production, which causes a strain in their marriage upon his return. She becomes pregnant with his child but also begins to realize her obsession with Kruger-Brent and wonders if the company is becoming more important to her than her marriage. David is killed in an explosion in one of the company's mines, causing Kate to prematurely give birth to Anthony "Tony" Blackwell.

Kate makes Kruger-Brent a global success, though her demanding nature causes Tony to stutter in her presence. Tony opts for an art career and goes to an art school in France. He shows promise, but Kate pays a critic to negatively criticize Tony's work, leading him to give up his art and join Kruger-Brent. While working, he learns that Dominique, his French girlfriend, was actually a model working under one of Kruger-Brent's smaller companies and was paid by his mother to spy on him, and he gains the courage to cut Kate out of his life. Kate uses his hatred of her to manipulate him into marrying Marianne Hoffman so Kate can obtain the Hoffman electronics empire as well as grandchildren to inherit the company. Despite warnings from Marianne's doctor about her health, Kate persuades her to have children, and she dies giving birth to twin girls. Tony learns of how his mother persuaded Marianne to carry out the pregnancy at the same time Dominique reveals his mother was responsible for the end of his art career. Tony goes insane and tries to kill Kate to "save her" from the company. She is wounded, and he is then lobotomized and sent to an asylum while Kate takes care of both the company and her identical granddaughters, Eve and Alexandra.

Eve, the elder twin, is manipulative, evil, and despises Alexandra, a trusting and sweet girl. Eve has secretly attempted to kill Alexandra several times. Kate decides to name Eve heir to Kruger-Brent and Alexandra as the head of the conglomerate's charities, but disinherits Eve when she discovers Eve's true nature. Eve meets George Mellis, an heir like her who has been disinherited by his wealthy family, and they plot to have George marry Alexandra and kill her, leaving George with Alexandra's fortune while Kate will have no choice but to take Eve back to run the company. Eve manages to help George marry Alexandra, but she taunts him to the point that he nearly beats her to death. A talented surgeon, Keith Webster, fixes her face, and Kate reconciles with Eve and plans to put her back in her will. Eve decides she no longer needs George and decides to get rid of him. She intercepts Alexandra and prevents her rendezvous with George. Eve then pretends to be Alexandra and kills him. The police find his body and build a case against Eve. Keith realizes the truth when Dr. John Harley, the family's doctor whom Eve visited under the guise of a suicidal Alexandra, says he was able to tell the twins apart because of Eve's facial scar from her assault though Keith knows he left no scars on Eve's face and has a post surgical photo to prove it. Keith threatens to show the photo to the police if Eve doesn't marry him, and although she complies she cheats on him openly with a younger man. Keith refuses to testify at the coroner's inquest and Kate gives Eve an alibi, believing Eve murdered George but thinking she will punish Eve in her own way. Before she can do so, Keith deliberately destroys Eve's face during a laugh line removal procedure, making Eve devoted to Keith in fear that he will leave her alone with her ugliness. Kate considers this punishment enough. Alexandra marries George's psychiatrist, Dr. Peter Templeton, and they have a son named Robert.

Back in the present, Robert, now eight, is a classical pianist prodigy. Kate tries to meddle with Robert's future, but is rebuffed by Alexandra and Peter who say Robert will choose his own life and won't be forced to take over Kruger-Brent. Kate relents, saying she would never interfere in anyone's life choices. She then offers to introduce young Robert to a renowned musician as she once offered to help with Tony's art career.

== Reception ==
Master of the Game debuted at #9 on The New York Times Best Seller list, spent four weeks at number one, eight weeks at #2, and remained on the list itself for a total of 38 weeks. The book became the fourth bestselling novel of 1982 in the United States, as recorded by The New York Times. The novel was also selected to be a Main Selection of The Literary Guild.

In critical reviewing, The New York Review of Books stated that the book was "compulsively readable", and praised the author by saying "Any writer who can get his audience to ask breathlessly, 'What next?' needs no help from this or any other envious reviewer." Publishers Weekly called the book an "engaging and absorbing family saga", while the Los Angeles Times Review of Books commented that Sheldon was "a genius... at writing potboilers. In Master of the Game he has outdone even himself". The Los Angeles Times also reviewed the lack of sex in the book. "This viewer hoped for a wee spot of sex to relieve the monotony. The business of sexual union is depicted with curious, witless brevity" The New York Times disagreed, stating that "If your reading taste runs to rape, sodomy, homosexuality, and numerous other fleshy diversions, be assured; Mr. Sheldon has something for you." In Massachusetts, the Worcester Sunday Telegram reviews that "the title of this book is an apt description of the author. In the business of creating hard-to-put-down bestsellers, Sidney Sheldon is indeed the master of the game.", while USA Today praises Sheldon by saying that he is"a master storyteller at the top of the game." In Europe, the London Review of Books categorizes the main protagonist of the novel, Kate Blackwell as being "presented as some kind of role model, but it is the sort of role made popular in olden times by Joan Crawford".

The Los Angeles Times concludes the book review with "This book is really a number of silly little stories strung loosely together like 'schlenters' (fools diamonds) about to fall off a string of dental floss.", referring to terms used in South Africa, while the London Review of Books ended with "This particular story is so schematically written that it could be used as a script for a film which has not yet been made but will undoubtedly proceed, as of right, to the wide screen."

== Adaptations ==
A television miniseries adaptation aired in the US in three installments beginning on February 19, 1984, starring Dyan Cannon as Kate Blackwell, Harry Hamlin as Tony Blackwell, Ian Charleson as Jamie McGregor, Cliff DeYoung as Brad Rogers, Fernando Allende as George Mellis, Liane Langland as Eve and Alexandra Blackwell, Donald Pleasence as Salomon van der Merwe, Cherie Lunghi as Margaret McGregor, Jean Marsh as Mrs. Talley, Barry Morse as Dr. John Harley, Johnny Sekka as Banda, Angharad Rees as Marianne Hoffman, Maryam d'Abo as Dominique Masson, David Suchet as André d'Usseau, with guest stars Leslie Caron as Solange Dunas, and David Birney as David Blackwell. Several notable actors appeared in smaller roles, including Alan Dobie as MacMillan, Jimmy Nail as Schmidt and Stratford Johns as Zimmerman.

The miniseries was produced by CBS Television and Rosemont Productions International Ltd. It was nominated for the Emmy Award for "Outstanding Achievement in Music Composition for a Limited Series or a Special" for the first part of the series. The miniseries was released on DVD on May 4, 2009. The series was also shown on BBC One in the UK later in the year, beginning on September 2.

The novel was also adapted into a radio drama series by Nuran Devres, titled Oyunun Kuralı (the Rule of the Game), starring Tomris Oğuzalp as Kate and Cahit Şaher as Tony.

== See also ==
- List of bestselling novels in the United States in the 1980s
