= Morning, Noon and Night =

Morning, Noon and Night may refer to:

- Morning, Noon and Night (novel), a novel by Sidney Sheldon
- Morning, Noon and Night (film), a 1933 Fleischer Studios animated short film featuring the von Suppé music
- Morning, Noon and Night, a trio of plays written in 1968 by Terrence McNally, Israel Horovitz, and Leonard Melfi, see Noon
- Morning, Noon and Night (convenience store), a Scottish convenience store chain
- Morning Noon Night, a 2002 album by Canadian singer-songwriter Jim Guthrie
- "Morning, Noon & Night", a song recorded by Big Joe Turner

== See also ==
- Ein Morgen, ein Mittag und ein Abend in Wien (Morning, Noon, and Night in Vienna), an 1844 overture by Franz von Suppé
