= Are You Afraid of the Dark? (disambiguation) =

Are You Afraid of the Dark? is a horror anthology television series created by D. J. MacHale and Ned Kandel.

Are You Afraid of the Dark? may also refer to:

- Are You Afraid of the Dark? (book series), a 1995 book series based on the television series
- Are You Afraid of the Dark? (novel), a 2004 novel by Sidney Sheldon
