= Nothing Lasts Forever (Sheldon novel) =

Novel by Sidney Sheldon

- First edition
- Author: Sidney Sheldon
- Language: English
- Genre: Crime Medical novel
- Publisher: William Morrow
- Publication date: 1994
- Publication place: United States
- Media type: Print (Hardback & Paperback)
- Pages: 398 pp
- ISBN: 0-688-08491-5
- OCLC: 29845917
- Dewey Decimal: 813/.54 20
- LC Class: PS3569.H3927 N67 1994
- Preceded by: The Stars Shine Down
- Followed by: Morning, Noon and Night

Nothing Lasts Forever is a 1994 novel by Sidney Sheldon.

This medical thriller tells the story of three female doctors trying to prove themselves in a profession dominated by men. Each of them has their own story, and each of their tales are well connected and intertwined with each other. But suddenly there is chaos, one dies, another is about to get the hospital shut down, and the third faces the death penalty for murder.

The story was turned into a CBS miniseries, from the executive producer David Gerber. It starred Brooke Shields, Vanessa Williams and Gail O'Grady.
