= Madolyn Smith =

American former actress

- Born: April 21, 1957 (age 69); Albuquerque, New Mexico, U.S.
- Other name: Madolyn Smith Osborne
- Education: University of Southern California
- Occupation: Actress
- Years active: 1980–1994, 2010
- Known for: Urban Cowboy; 2010: The Year We Make Contact; Funny Farm; All of Me; Class of '96
- Spouse: Mark Osborne (m. 1988)
- Children: 2

Madolyn Smith (born April 21, 1957) is a retired American actress, known for her roles in the films Urban Cowboy (1980), 2010: The Year We Make Contact (1984), and Funny Farm (1988).

== Career ==
Smith first came to public attention with her role as Pam in the 1980 film Urban Cowboy. She later co-starred in the films 2010: The Year We Make Contact (1984), the sequel to 2001: A Space Odyssey, and the comedy All of Me (1984). Reviewing the latter film, Pauline Kael wrote in The New Yorker that Smith was a "talented and stunning brunette ... who knows how to make guile and bitchery funny, and who has a comic charge comparable to Lily Tomlin's." In the early 1980s she also appeared in several TV movies, including Pray TV, Rehearsal for Murder and Deadly Intentions. She portrayed Jehan Sadat, wife of Egyptian president Anwar Sadat, in the 1983 TV miniseries Sadat, and played Ernie Kovacs' wife Dorothy in the 1984 TV movie Ernie Kovacs: Between the Laughter.

Smith starred as Tracy Whitney in the 1986 TV miniseries If Tomorrow Comes, based on the Sidney Sheldon novel of the same name. She subsequently costarred in films like Funny Farm (1988) opposite Chevy Chase and The Super (1991) with Joe Pesci; the 1990 TV movies The Plot to Kill Hitler and The Rose and the Jackal; and the 1990 miniseries The Kennedys of Massachusetts.

Smith guest-starred in a 1989 episode of the sitcom Cheers titled "What's Up, Doc?". She was the first choice of the creators to replace Shelley Long. She also appeared in multiple episodes of the 1993 drama series Class of '96. Her last TV appearance was in a 1994 episode of Due South, after which she retired. Smith later provided some narration in the 2010 documentary film Louis Sullivan: The Struggle for American Architecture.

== Personal life ==
Born in Albuquerque, New Mexico, Smith graduated from the University of Southern California. She married National Hockey League player Mark Osborne in 1988.

== Filmography ==
Film and Television Roles
Year	Title	Role	Notes
1980	Urban Cowboy	Pam	
1981	Trapper John, M.D.	Bonnie Wicks	Episode: "That Old Gang of Mine"
1982	Pray TV	Liz Oakes	TV movie
1982	Rehearsal for Murder	Karen Daniels	TV movie
1983	The Other Woman	Cindy Barnes	TV movie
1983	Casablanca		Episode: "Master Builder's Woman"
1983	Sadat	Jihan Sadat	Miniseries
1984	All of Me	Peggy Schuyler	
1984	2010	Caroline Floyd	
1984	Ernie Kovacs: Between the Laughter	Dorothy Kovacs	TV movie
1985	Deadly Intentions	Katherine Raynor	TV movie
1986	If Tomorrow Comes	Tracy Whitney	Miniseries
1987	The Caller	The Girl	
1988	Funny Farm	Elizabeth Farmer	
1989	Cheers	Dr. Sheila Rydell	Episode: "What's Up, Doc?" (as Madolyn Smith Osborne)
1990	The Plot to Kill Hitler	Countess Nina von Stauffenberg	TV movie
1990	The Kennedys of Massachusetts	Gloria Swanson	Miniseries (as Madolyn Smith Osborne)
1990	The Rose and the Jackal	Rose O'Neal Greenhow	TV movie (as Madolyn Smith Osborne)
1991	Final Approach	Casey Halsey	
1991	The Super	Naomi Bensinger	(as Madolyn Smith Osborne)
1993	Class of '96	Dean Keller	4 episodes (as Madolyn Smith Osborne)
1994	Due South	Mackenzie King	Episode: "Diefenbaker's Day Off" (as Madolyn Smith-Osborne)
2010	Louis Sullivan: The Struggle for American Architecture	Louis Sullivan (voice)	Documentary film (as Madolyn Smith Osborne)
