= After the Darkness =

After the Darkness may refer to:

- Sidney Sheldon's After the Darkness, a 2010 novel by Tilly Bagshawe
- Paglipas ng Dilim (After the Darkness), a 1920 play by Precioso Palma

== See also ==
- After Darkness (disambiguation)
