= Tell Me Your Dreams =

1998 novel by Sidney Sheldon

- First edition (US)
- Author: Sidney Sheldon
- Language: English
- Genre: Thriller novel
- Publisher: William Morrow (US); HarperCollins (UK)
- Publication date: 1998
- Publication place: United States
- Pages: 363
- ISBN: 0-446-60720-7
- OCLC: 41880695
- Preceded by: The Best Laid Plans
- Followed by: The Sky Is Falling

Tell Me Your Dreams is a 1998 novel by American writer Sidney Sheldon on Dissociative Identity Disorder or Split Personality.

== Plot summary ==
The main characters of the book are Ashley Patterson, an introverted workaholic, her co-workers, Toni Prescott, an outgoing singer and dancer, shy artist Alette Peters and Ashley's father, Dr. Steven Patterson.

The three women struggle to get along because of their very different personalities. Toni and Alette are usually friendly with each other, as Alette often helps keep the peace, but Toni strongly dislikes Ashley and frequently criticizes her. Despite their differences, all three share emotional struggles caused by their mothers telling them they would never succeed.

Ashley fears that somebody is following her. She finds her house lights turned on when she returns from work, her personal effects in disarray, and someone has written "You will die" on her mirror with a lipstick. She thinks someone's broken into her house. She requests a police escort, but the next morning, the police officer assigned to this duty is found dead in her apartment. Two other murders have already taken place, with an identical pattern. All the murdered men had been castrated and were having sex before being murdered. Evidence points to the same woman being involved in all three cases. When a gift from one of the murdered men to Toni is found among Ashley's things, she is identified as the killer and arrested. At this point, it is revealed that the three women are three selves of a woman suffering from multiple personality disorder (MPD).

Sheriff Dowling took a deep breath. "Ashley Patterson...Toni Prescott...Alette Peters, they're all the same fucking person."

Ashley's father persuades an attorney friend, David Singer, to represent Ashley. The second half of the novel deals with the trial, complete with endless squabbling between opposing psychiatrists as to whether or not MPD is real. Finally when David introduces Toni, the violent alter of Ashley, the court is convinced that Ashley is innocent. Ashley is committed to an insane asylum and in the course of therapy is introduced to her two "alters" and relives the horrific events that shattered her mind. She was sexually abused during her childhood, and this made her develop a strong hatred towards men.

In the asylum, Ashley is treated for MPD by Dr. Gilbert and Dr. Otto Lewis. Gilbert falls for her and during her crisis, he too feels her pain and wants to comfort her. It is revealed that her father, Dr. Steven, was the one who sexually abused her, causing her to develop Dissociative Identity Disorder resulting in the creation of the alter Toni, and becomes a thing of her mother's detest. While living in Italy during her teenage years, she was once again assaulted by her father, leading to the creation of Alette. The structuring of both the alters is very interesting. The first alter represents her struggle and fear as a helpless child without sexual maturity, and (Toni) develops into a protective one and becomes murderous when faced with similar conditions.The second alter (Alette) represents her feeling of shame and the pain of being breached, thus developing into a source of console exhibiting warmth and motherly love who has good rapport with Ashley.

However, Toni is enraged when she learns that the woman her father is about to marry has a three-year-old daughter and is afraid that the girl would suffer the same fate she had. Dr. Gilbert drains anger out of Toni by showing the news everyday, making Toni softer with each passing day.

This softer side of Toni is only a front to show Dr. Gilbert she has finally accepted everything so she and Alette can get out of the asylum to kill her father, who is staying in The Hamptons for Christmas. Soon, Dr. Gilbert releases her from the asylum as he believes she is cured.

...listen to me. We go along with the doctor. We make him believe that we're really trying to help him. We string him along. We're in no hurry. And I promise you that one day I'll get us out of here.

In the end, Ashley is shown to be traveling on a train to The Hamptons, where her father is staying, when Toni suddenly shows up to kill him.

Toni in the last part of the novel:

There could have been a terrible ending for her, but this was the happy ending she had prayed for. I'm on my way at last. And as the train headed toward The Hamptons, she began to sing softly.
