= The Doomsday Conspiracy =

1991 novel by Sidney Sheldon

- First edition
- Author: Sidney Sheldon
- Language: English
- Genre: Thriller
- Publisher: William Morrow
- Publication date: 1991
- Publication place: United States
- Media type: Print (hardback & paperback)
- Pages: 412
- ISBN: 0-688-08489-3
- Preceded by: Memories of Midnight
- Followed by: The Stars Shine Down

The Doomsday Conspiracy is a thriller novel by American writer Sidney Sheldon published in 1991. The story concerns an American naval officer who encounters a murderous and mysterious force and actions during an investigation in a balloon accident in the Swiss Alps.

== Synopsis ==
Robert Bellamy, an agent of the Office of Naval Intelligence (ONI), receives a mission on behalf of the NSA: to locate the witnesses of the crash of an experimental meteorological balloon in Switzerland, for which he is only given the date, the place where it happened, and the fact that the witnesses were passengers of a bus tour. He is given an unlimited budget but is told he must work strictly undercover. After he finds the first witness, he discovers that the meteorological balloon was actually an alien spaceship. He tracks the witnesses one by one and reports their names to the NSA. Without his knowledge, the names of the witnesses are then communicated to the intelligence organizations of their respective countries, and each of them is assassinated shortly after. These actions are coordinated under the name "Operation Doomsday", under the leadership of a figure known only as Janus.

Robert's personal history is shown through flashbacks: he rose in the military ranks under the mentorship of Admiral Ralph Whittaker, and during a combat flight in Vietnam his plane was taken down, with Whittaker son's dying in the crash and Robert being badly injured. Doctors declare that he has no chance of survival, but a nurse named Susan convinces them to operate on him and encourages him to keep his fighting spirit. He and Susan fall in love after his recovery and marry. Robert is then recruited to become a spy for the ONI, but this job takes over his personal life until Susan divorces him and marries a business tycoon named Monte Banks, while Robert isolates himself and dedicates even more to his work.

In a conversation with the last witness, he mentions to Robert an additional one, a woman whom he had not seen in the bus. When Robert tries to contact the other bus passengers to corroborate this information, he finds out that all of them are dead. He deduces that this is an international effort since they died in different countries, and he also concludes that the final step of the operation would be his own death to eliminate all knowledge about the alien ship. He then goes into hiding right as Janus sends an instruction to kill him.

Robert goes for help to Li, one of his friends who lives in Paris. Li explains to him about Operation Doomsday, revealing that aliens have been in communication with the governments of Earth for a while, demanding a stop of industrial pollution to save the Earth's environment, before revealing that he is a member of the operation and shooting Robert. Robert wins the fight and kills him, but he is badly wounded and realizes that he will eventually be killed unless he negotiates.

The mysterious last witness is revealed to be an alien who survived the crash of the spaceship and disguised herself as a woman. She contacts Robert through a piece of the spaceship that he got from one of the witnesses, and they arrange to meet back in Switzerland where the ship crashed. Robert also calls the NSA and asks to meet Janus there. In the final confrontation, Janus is revealed to be Admiral Whittaker, Robert's mentor. He also confesses that he sabotaged Robert's marriage to keep him at the ONI, and eventually decided to have him killed for not being committed enough to his job. Monte Banks is revealed to be part of the Doomsday conspiracy, as he owns many industries that would lose money if they were not able to pollute. Both are abducted by the aliens, who task Robert with the mission of spreading environmental awareness on Earth.

== Influence ==
Dan Brown, the author of The Da Vinci Code, named The Doomsday Conspiracy as the book that inspired him to write thriller fiction, citing its "simplicity of the prose and efficiency of the storyline". (Note: The two sources provided here differ on how Sheldon inspired Brown. He indicates on Page 3 of his 2006 witness statement that Sheldon's book was an attention-holding page turner that reminded him how fun it was to read, but the BBC source indicates that he thought he could "do better" than Sheldon.)

MF Doom adapted part of the text for samples in his debut album, Operation: Doomsday.
