= Windmills of the Gods (miniseries) =

- Based on: Windmills of the Gods by Sidney Sheldon
- Written by: John Gay
- Directed by: Lee Philips
- Starring: Jaclyn Smith; Robert Wagner; Ian McKellen; Michael Moriarty
- Music by: Perry Botkin
- Countries of origin: United States; United Kingdom
- Original language: English

Production
- Executive producer: Sidney Sheldon
- Producer: Michael Viner
- Cinematography: Gayne Rescher
- Running time: 187 minutes
- Production company: ITC Entertainment

Original release
- Network: CBS
- Release: February 7 – February 9, 1988

Windmills of the Gods is a 1988 American two-part television miniseries directed by Lee Philips and starring Jaclyn Smith and Robert Wagner. It is based on the 1987 novel of the same name written by Sidney Sheldon, who also served as executive producer. It was broadcast in two parts by CBS on February 7, 1988, and February 9, 1988. It was the fifth miniseries based on a Sheldon book, and the third adaptation starring Jaclyn Smith.

== Cast ==
- Jaclyn Smith as Mary Ashley
- Robert Wagner as Mike Slade
- Franco Nero as President of Romania Alex Ionescu
- Christopher Cazenove as Dr. Louis Desforges
- Michael Moriarty as President of United States Paul Ellison
- Ian McKellen as Chairman
- Ruby Dee as Dorothy, Mary Ashley's Secretary
- Susan Tyrrell as Neusa Muñoz Angel
- Jeffrey DeMunn as Stanton Rogers
- David Ackroyd as Dr. Edward Ashley
- Stephanie Faracy as Florence Schiffer
- Ari Meyers as Beth Ashley
- Richard K. Olsen as Ben Cohn
- Betsy Palmer as Mrs. Hart Brisbane
- John Pleshette as CIA Agent Eddie Maltz
- John Standing as Sir George
- J.T. Walsh as Colonel Bill McKinney
- Jean-Pierre Aumont
- Lisa Pelikan as Hannah Murphy, American Girl Jailed In Romania
- Nicholas Ball as Harry Lantz
