= The Other Side of Midnight =

1973 novel by Sidney Sheldon

- First edition
- Author: Sidney Sheldon
- Language: English
- Genre: Thriller
- Publisher: William Morrow
- Publication date: 1973
- Media type: Print (Paperback)
- Pages: 598
- ISBN: 0-446-35740-5
- OCLC: 22474536
- Followed by: Memories of Midnight

The Other Side of Midnight is a novel by American writer Sidney Sheldon published in 1973. The book reached No. 1 on the New York Times Best Seller list.

It was made into a 1977 film, and followed by a sequel written by Sheldon titled Memories of Midnight.

== Plot ==
[Much of this plot explanation is based on the movie and not the novel] Set in between the two World Wars, Noelle Page is born to a poor family in Marseille, France, though she is led to believe she is better than everyone else. She is initially devoted to her father, who capitalizes on her beauty when she comes of age and forces her to be the mistress of Auguste Lanchon, a well-off boutique owner. She comes to an epiphany that if she can control men, she can be powerful. She escapes to Paris, where she is enchanted by American pilot Lawrence "Larry" Douglas, who promises to marry her when he returns from London. When he does not return, she develops pneumonia, and is saved by Jewish medical intern Israel Katz, who selflessly helps her get back on her feet. Furious over Larry's betrayal, she aborts their unborn child in the most painful way and devotes the rest of her life planning revenge against him. Meanwhile, Larry returns to the United States and marries Catherine, though their relationship is strained after World War II, since Catherine feels like Larry returned as a different man.

Noelle uses the war to her advantage. She hires a private investigator and learns of Larry and Catherine's marriage. She seduces two men, actor-singer Philippe Sorel and director Armand Gautier, and becomes a popular name in theater and film. At one point, she risks her plan to help Israel — the only man who has treated her with kindness — escape to Africa from the Nazis. She attracts the attention of Constantin "Costa" Demiris, a powerful Greek whose business extends to every industry in the world. She becomes his mistress and moves to his private villa. She learns that Larry is having a difficult time adjusting to a regular life and his aggressive pilot skills make him unsuited to a commercial airline setting, and convinces Demiris to hire him. Larry and Catherine move to Greece for his new job, whereupon Noelle discovers that Larry does not even remember her. She treats him poorly as an employee, pushing him to angrily rape her when she humiliates him. She gets excited and falls in love with him again. Larry cannot recall her claims of their past, but stays with her for her power. However, he becomes unsettled when his other mistress, Helena — compromising his and Noelle's relationship — is badly beaten and then suddenly disappears. Noelle insists that Larry and Catherine, whose marriage is malfunctional, divorce so they can be together. When Catherine constantly refuses and fails an attempted suicide, Noelle plots with Larry to kill her. Larry pretends to reconcile with Catherine and talks her into going with him on a trip. He tries to abandon her in a sea cave, but is forced to return for her when the coast guard notices him exiting alone. While being treated for shock and exposure upon rescue from the cave, Catherine tries to tell the doctor about Larry's plot to kill her, but the doctor thinks she is hallucinating. Catherine wakes up in the middle of the night and overhears Larry and Noelle plotting her death, so she escapes during a heavy thunderstorm. She goes into a boat, but falls overboard, apparently drowning.

Catherine's claims against them cause Larry and Noelle to be put on trial for her murder. Demiris is noticeably absent, but visits Noelle in jail. He claims to still love her and offers to pay the judge off if she will stay with him forever. Towards the end of the trial, Demiris' lawyer, Napoleon Chotas, informs Larry, Noelle, and Larry's lawyer Stavros that Demiris made a deal with the judge: if they plead guilty, Larry will be banned from Greece and will serve a short sentence in America while Noelle's passport will be taken and she will stay with him forever. They both agree to the deal. However, after pleading guilty, they realize that there was never a deal made when the judge thanks them for having a conscience and admitting to the murder despite the lack of evidence against them. Chotas offers Stavros a position in his firm in exchange for his silence. They are sentenced to death, and Demiris, sitting in the courtroom, looks pleased. They are executed months later.

In the end, Demiris donates money to a convent near the sea, where a woman implied to be Catherine is kept, having been found on the shore.

== Adaptations ==
=== Film and television ===
- The Other Side of Midnight (1977), directed by Charles Jarrott. The cast includes Marie-France Pisier, John Beck, Susan Sarandon, Christian Marquand and Josette Banzet.
- Oh Bewafa (India, 1980)
- In Japan, The Other Side of Midnight was adapted and broadcast as a television drama, starring Asaka Seto, Kōji Kikkawa, Koyuki, Toshiyuki Hosokawa, and Tetsuji Tamayama, with music by Miki Imai.
- In Turkey, it was adapted into a radio drama starring Olcay Poyraz as Catherine, Arsen Gürzap as Noelle Page, and Kerim Afşar as Larry Douglas.

== Sequel ==
In 1990, Sheldon released a sequel titled Memories of Midnight. It was adapted into a 1991 television mini-series starring Jane Seymour as Catherine Alexander. In Japan, it was adapted and broadcast as a radio drama, with a soundtrack by Yoko Kanno and Maaya Sakamoto.
