= If Tomorrow Comes (novel) =

Novel by Sidney Sheldon

- Author: Sidney Sheldon
- Language: English
- Genre: Crime fiction
- Publisher: Warner Books
- Publication date: 1985
- Publication place: United States
- Media type: Print
- Pages: 416
- ISBN: 0-446-35742-1
- Preceded by: Master of the Game
- Followed by: Windmills of the Gods

If Tomorrow Comes is a 1985 crime fiction novel by American author Sidney Sheldon. It is a story portraying an ordinary woman who is framed by the Mafia, her subsequent quest for vengeance towards them, and her later life as a con-artist. The novel was adapted into a three-part TV miniseries with the same name in 1986, starring Madolyn Smith and Tom Berenger.

== Plot ==
Tracy is a successful bank manager in Philadelphia, engaged to a wealthy heir, whose child she is carrying. Then her mother commits suicide, after being scammed by the New Orleans Mafia and left in debt. Tracy gets a gun to frighten the scammer, Joe Romano, into admitting her mother's innocence, but he tries to rape her and is wounded in the struggle. Her attorney convinces her that she will get a much shorter sentence if she pleads guilty, but the judge sentences her to serve fifteen years in the Southern Louisiana Penitentiary for Women. She realises that the judge and the attorney are both working for Romano's boss, mafia Don Anthony Orsatti. As she goes to jail, her employer and her fiancé abandon her and the unborn child, which she miscarries under the horrendous abuse she suffers from her prison mates.

Tracy now decides to avenge herself on all the men who have ruined her life. Granted an official pardon for saving the life of the warden's daughter, she uses her banking knowledge to frame Romano as an informant by planting an unexpectedly large sum of money in his account; the paranoid Orsatti has him murdered. Then she gets the boyfriend of one of her jail-mates to trick Orsatti into thinking that her former attorney has been fixing card games behind his back, resulting in his also being murdered. While the judge is vacationing in Russia, she sends him coded letters intercepted by the KGB that convince them that he is an undercover spy, and he is sentenced to fourteen years of hard labor in Siberia. She stalks her ex-fiancé and his new wife but decides that they look so bored and unhappy with each other that no further punishment is needed.

With a criminal record, however, her career is over, and Tracy reinvents herself as a professional con-woman, thief, and mistress of disguise, stealing from those who she believes deserve to be robbed. In the course of a colorful crime spree all over Europe with FBI, INTERPOL and the Federal Police stalking her, she falls in love with one of her co-conspirators, Jeff Stevens, and they plan to take their winnings and live a law-abiding life in Brazil. But on the plane, she finds herself sitting next to a wealthy criminal mastermind, Maximilian Pierpont, who shows a strong interest in her, and we are left wondering if she will try to steal from him too.

== Characters ==
- Tracy Whitney: The protagonist. An ex-banker who is falsely implicated and sent to jail. Upon her release, after a number of unsuccessful attempts to procure a job, she reluctantly becomes a con-artist. Soon enough, she becomes one of the best in the world.
- Jeff Stevens: Another con-artist and Tracy's love interest.
- Joe Romano: A member of the New Orleans Mafia. He works for the mafia don Anthony Orsatti.
- Anthony Orsatti: The don of the New Orleans Mafia.

== Adaptation ==
The novel was adapted into the three-part TV miniseries If Tomorrow Comes in 1986, starring Madolyn Smith and Tom Berenger.

The Malayalam film 22 Female Kottayam was inspired by this novel. The film was remade into Tamil as Malini 22 Palayamkottai which itself was dubbed into Telugu as Ghatana.

The 2004 Bollywood Film Ek Hasina Thi also borrowed elements from the novel.

== Sequels ==
Author Tilly Bagshawe has written two novels featuring the Tracy Whitney character: Sidney Sheldon's Chasing Tomorrow (2014) and Sidney Sheldon's Reckless (2015).
