= Deadly Intentions... Again? =

- Genre: Thriller
- Written by: William Wood
- Directed by: James Steven Sadwith
- Starring: Harry Hamlin; Joanna Kerns; Conchata Ferrell; Kevin McNulty; Fairuza Balk; Eileen Brennan
- Theme music composer: J. Peter Robinson
- Country of origin: United States
- Original language: English

Production
- Executive producers: Allen S. Epstein; Jim Green
- Production location: Vancouver
- Cinematography: Ron Orieux
- Editor: Scott Vickrey
- Running time: 100 mins
- Production companies: Green/Epstein Productions; Lorimar Television

Original release
- Network: ABC
- Release: February 11, 1991

Deadly Intentions... Again? is a 1991 American made-for-television thriller film and a sequel to the 1985 film Deadly Intentions.

== Plot ==
After serving time for the attempted murder of his first wife, the main character, a doctor, begins plotting to kill his second.

== Cast ==
- Harry Hamlin : Charles Raynor
- Joanna Kerns : Sally Raynor
- Fairuza Balk : Stacey
- Rochelle Greenwood : Nora
- Conchata Ferrell : Joanie
- Kevin McNulty : Doctor Uttley
- Bill Dow : Bill Garner
- Jenn Griffin : Ticket Agent
- Bernadette Leonard : Sheila
- Eileen Brennan : Charlotte Raynor
