= The Sky Is Falling (Sheldon novel) =

2001 novel by Sidney Sheldon

- Author: Sidney Sheldon
- Language: English
- Genre: Crime novel
- Publisher: William Morrow
- Publication date: 2001
- Publication place: United States
- Media type: Print (hardback & paperback)
- Pages: 416 pp (hardback edition)
- ISBN: 0-446-61017-8
- OCLC: 47349371
- Preceded by: Tell Me Your Dreams
- Followed by: Are You Afraid Of The Dark?

The Sky Is Falling is a 2001 crime novel by Sidney Sheldon. The book focuses on Dana Evans, a TV anchorwoman trying to find the killer who murdered the Winthrop family.

== Plot ==
The main character of this book is Dana Evans, an anchorwoman for the press, who was also featured, though not as a main character, in another Sidney Sheldon book, The Best Laid Plans.

The book begins with Dana Evans returning from Sarajevo with an armless adoptee, Kemal after filming war coverage for three months. Soon after, the last member of one of the most respected families in the world, Gary Winthrop dies after being shot by robbers. Dana decides to set out to find why anybody would want to kill the family well known for its kindness and contributions to charity (all of Gary's relatives had died in suspicious circumstances one at a time before him). Dana starts by visiting Roger Hudson, one of Taylor Winthrop, Gary's father's friends to start looking for answers.

Meanwhile, Kemal is facing difficulties at his current school from Ricky Underwood, who teases him about having only one arm. After being repeatedly warned by the school principal for getting into fights and swearing, things finally reach a breaking point where the principal expels Kemal. Dana's boss's secretary, Elliot Cromwell, helps Dana enroll Kemal in another school and refers her to an organization who help buy Kemal a prosthetic arm. As Jeff Connors, Dana's fiancé takes care of Kemal, Dana thinks about a motive for murdering the Winthrops. She rules out money, as when the Winthrop family dies, the fortune goes to charity. She settles on revenge as a motive, and starts hunting for clues by visiting the places where the Winthrops died.

Dana's search turns up cold, as all she meets say that the Winthrops were too good to have enemies. Finally, she gets the name Joan Sinisi, Taylor's secretary who filed a charge against Taylor, but later dropped it. After several failed attempts to contact her, Sinisi finally agrees to meet Dana after having the notion that someone is watching her. Sinisi later dies after being pushed off her penthouse window before being able to come to the meeting place. Dana then hears from the FRA, whose head, General Booster, kicks her out. At the same time, Jeff is forced to go to visit his ex-wife, who has breast cancer. Thus Dana employs a nanny to look after Kemal.

Dana eventually comes to Russia, where she finds out the pen she'd been given by her friends was a tracking device and destroys it and meets a military official named Sasha Shdandoff. Sasha promises to tell Dana why the Winthrops were killed, but she must first get him out of Russia, as someone is attempting to kill him. Dana accepts, and Sasha leads her to Krasnoyarsk-26, a closed town in Krasnoyarsk Krai. After disguising Dana as a prostitute and going in with her, Sasha explains that Krasnoyarsk-26 exists for the sole purpose of creating plutonium, the key ingredient in nuclear weapons. One hundred thousand scientists and technicians work there, and must sever all ties with the outside world before working there. It is impossible to shut down the plant as it warms the city above it, and without it the city's population would freeze to death. Taylor Winthrop was murdered by his business associate after he got too greedy and decided to take all the plutonium. Sasha then says he will reveal more when he is out of Russia. After talking to Roger and Pamela Hudson, who have guided her through her adventure, Dana returns to find Sasha dead. After a sniper attempts to kill her, Dana realizes that Roger was Taylor's business associate, who is trying to kill her now after knowing the truth.

Dana is then forced into a cat-and-mouse chase from Russia to the United States, finding out that several people that she trusts are working to kill her. She is ultimately able to elude her enemies, but the Hudsons trick her into coming to their house after claiming they have Kemal, who, after realizing his nanny is also trying to kill him and Dana and is feeding him sleeping pills, was able to escape the apartment, but was tranquilized and brought to the Hudsons. Dana goes to the Hudsons' house in the hope of saving Kemal, but finds it was a trap and that Kemal had already been left for dead in a burning school. The Hudsons' doorman, Cesar takes Dana to a park to drown, but Jeff Connors, whose ex-wife asked him to leave after lying that her mastectomy to prevent her cancer from spreading was successful, arrives in the TV studio's helicopter and decapitates Cesar using the helicopter blades. Dana weakly utters Kemal's name before fainting. Jeff gets the hint and is able to rescue Kemal from the burning school. The Hudsons, furious, try to leave on a private plane for Russia, despite the airport ordering them not to by General Booster, but their plane explodes thanks to a bomb planted by Boris Shdanoff, Sasha's brother. Soon after, Dana marries Jeff and gets pregnant, Kemal gets to star in a TV show, Jeff's ex-wife dies from cancer and the Hudsons end up starring as the first criminals on the TV station's new crime program. The book ends with Dana asking her boss, Matt about the murder of a 75-year-old millionaire in his hot tub.

== Book reviews ==
The book was described in a Publishers Weekly review as "[e]fficiently brisk and reliably suspenseful".

- http://www.bookbrowse.com/reviews/index.cfm?book_number=618
