= She's in the Army =

1942 film by Jean Yarbrough

- Directed by: Jean Yarbrough
- Screenplay by: Sidney Sheldon; George Bricker
- Produced by: Ted Richmond
- Starring: Lucile Gleason; Veda Ann Borg; Marie Wilson; Robert Lowery; Lyle Talbot; Warren Hymer
- Cinematography: Harry Neumann
- Edited by: Jack Ogilvie
- Production company: Monogram Pictures
- Distributed by: Monogram Pictures
- Release date: May 15, 1942
- Running time: 63 minutes
- Country: United States
- Language: English

She's in the Army is a 1942 American comedy film directed by Jean Yarbrough and written by Sidney Sheldon and George Bricker. The film stars Lucile Gleason, Veda Ann Borg, Marie Wilson, Robert Lowery, Lyle Talbot and Warren Hymer. The film was released on May 15, 1942, by Monogram Pictures.

== Plot ==
A socialite joins the Women's Ambulance Corps as both a publicity stunt and to win a bet with a newspaper columnist, who wagered $5000 that she couldn't last six weeks.

== Cast ==
- Lucile Gleason as Sgt. Hannah Walters
- Veda Ann Borg as Diane Jordan
- Marie Wilson as Susan Slatterty
- Robert Lowery as Lt. Jim Russell
- Lyle Talbot as Capt. Steve Russell
- Warren Hymer as Cpl. Buck Shane
- Eddie Acuff as Pete
- John Holland as Wally Lundigan
- Gene O'Donnell as Speed
- Charlotte Henry as Helen Burke
- Marvelle Andre as Instructor
- Lorraine Miller as Nightclub Singer
- Pat Moran as Janitor
- Martha Warner as Commander Davis
