= The Sands of Time (Sheldon novel) =

1988 novel by Sidney Sheldon

- First edition
- Author: Sidney Sheldon
- Language: English
- Genre: adventure romance
- Publisher: William Morrow
- Publication date: 1988
- Publication place: United States
- Media type: Print (hardback)
- Pages: 412
- ISBN: 978-0-446-35683-1
- OCLC: 20652560
- Preceded by: Windmills of the Gods
- Followed by: Memories of Midnight

The Sands of Time is a 1988 action novel by author Sidney Sheldon. The novel follows the adventures of four women who are forced to leave their Spanish convent for the outside world of threat, violence and passions; and two men who are pitted against each other in a fight to the death.

== Plot ==
In Pamplona, Spain in 1976, the Basque people are fighting against the Spanish government for their rights to autonomy. ETA leader Jaime Miró, along with friends Ricardo Mellado and Felix Carpio, escape from prison, but at the expense of many civilian lives during a sabotaged bull-running exhibit that was used as a distraction from the police. Following the event, the Prime Minister assigns Colonel Ramón Acoca (head of the anti-ETA group GOE) to hunt down Jaime Miró; Acoca's wife and unborn child were killed in a Basque demonstration assisted by ETA and the Church, so when he suspects Jaime hiding in a convent, he decides to raid it by force despite the implications of it.

The Cistercian Convent of the Strict Observance just outside Ávila, where women of all backgrounds choose to live a life of solitude, worship, and fasting, is run by Reverend Mother Betina. When the GOE raid the convent and proceed to assault and rape the sisters, four sisters manage to escape; the eldest nun, Teresa, is given the task to take the convent's only valuable asset, a cross made of gold, to the nearest convent where it will be safe. The four nuns have different back stories. The latest member of the convent, Sister Lucia, is actually Lucia Carmine, the wealthy daughter of a Mafia Don who went to the convent as a means of escape after she murdered three men involved in her father's arrest, and plans to lie low for a few months before escaping to Switzerland to retrieve her father's offshore money. Sister Graciela is the daughter of a bitter woman who loathes her daughter because she is a reminder of the man who left her, as well as the fact that Graciela "stole" her beauty, and beat her daughter unconscious when she caught her having sex with her current lover; Graciela found peace with God, and voluntarily went to the convent. Sister Megan was abandoned and was never claimed for adoption and opted to join the convent instead of becoming a maid, but longs to know who her real family is. And Sister Teresa was a religious person growing up until her younger, more beautiful sister Monique stole her fiancé, and she went against God until she decided to stay in a convent when her fiancé begged for her forgiveness and said he was coming back for her.

Lucia is determined to make it to the Swiss border without drawing suspicion, and plots to steal the golden cross, pawn it, and use the money to go to Switzerland. They are tricked by a man named Carrillo who poses as a priest, but they manage to subdue him before he rapes Graciela. They change out of their convent clothes to seem inconspicuous while travelling. However, they run into Jaime and his men, along with Jaime's girlfriend Amparo. Afraid that the sisters will give away their location, they decide to take them to their hideout.

Colonel Acoca has figured out that four of the nuns are missing and is convinced that Jaime Miró escaped before the soldiers got there. The Prime Minister doubts that he was there in the first place and believes that Acoca is starting to get out of control, but continues to have the Colonel search for both Miró and the missing nuns, in order to avoid public's suspicion and critics about the brutality and raid to the convent done by his men for no obvious reason. They get a tip from Carrillo, whom they suspect due to the robes left in the store that he was subdued in.

Meanwhile, Sister Teresa, nervous about leaving the convent after years of solitude, has become paranoid of everyone, including the men escorting her to the ETA hideout. She sees a father pushing a baby stroller, and is anxious that it is her fiancé and his child with his sister, but she tries to remind herself that the infant is supposed to be an adult by now.

Meanwhile, Ellen Scott, a CEO of Scott Industries, has incurable cancer. She once was a middle-class worker who saved the life of Milo Scott, the younger brother of Byron Scott, the then-CEO of the company. They married and Ellen went to live in New York, where she saw how Byron mistreated Milo and how greedy and manipulative upper-class people were, turning her into a bitter woman whose only consolation was that Byron would eventually give the company to Milo. However, Byron and his wife produced a daughter named Patricia, and Milo and Ellen feared that Byron would name her the heiress of the company. During a business trip to Spain, the private jet they are travelling in crashes, killing everyone except Milo, Ellen, and Patricia. Ellen convinces Milo that if they take Patricia, they will simply raise her before she comes of age and inherits everything and leave them with nothing, and they abandon her at a farm and claim that they are the only survivors. However, during the reading of Byron's will, it is revealed that Byron's personal assets go to Patricia, but Milo will inherit the company, leaving them both guilty over abandoning Patricia, since they cannot claim her now and face suspicions that they attempted to abandon her. Milo dies of guilt a year later, leaving Ellen to inherit the company. She hires her chief of security, former detective Alan Tucker, to search for a baby abandoned in Avila, Spain, not telling him why. It is implied that the baby is Sister Megan.

Back in Spain, Colonel Acoca informs his colleagues that the nuns are with Jaime Miró, saying one of Jaime's friends are actually his informants. Sister Teresa is slowly going insane, believing that the terrorists were hired by Raoul to kidnap her and take her back. While everyone is sleeping, she leaves the golden cross with Lucia and makes her way to Colonel Acoca's camp, informing them of their location, and begging them not to let her go to her former fiancé. They raid the camp, and Jaime agrees to split the group to avoid capture - Ricardo Mellado with Sister Graciela, Rubio Arzano with Sister Lucia, and Jaime Miró, Felix Carpio, and Amparo with Sister Megan. Acoca interrogates Sister Teresa for their location, but her madness has taken over is of no use, and he has his men rape her until she speaks. She decides that she has been abandoned by God, but evil still exists and steals a pistol to shoot a few of them before she is shot dead.

Meanwhile, Alan Tucker is in Ávila tracking the baby. He visits the priest involved with the orphanage, the hospital, and the orphanage itself and manages to connect that the baby is in fact Patricia Scott, and that Ellen needs to find her as an heiress to the company. He decides to blackmail Ellen, hoping to become her business partner.

Lucia is entertained by Rubio, who believes that she has been in the convent for ten years and does not know what the current state of the world is. She thinks she is falling for him, but is determined to get her money. At the same time, Jaime is reflecting upon his life as a terrorist. His family sought refuge in a Church from the Spaniards, but everyone but him died, and he sought revenge and at the same time did not like the Church, which was why he was reluctant to take the sisters. He and Megan start to become friends, which Amparo is not pleased about. As the group stops at a hotel for the night, the room clerk calls the police, but they manage to escape.

Rubio asks Lucia to say a prayer and shares the only prayer she knows. For the first time in her life, Lucia understands the prayer and what it means to her. While taking a bath in a stream, Lucia almost drowns, and Rubio saves her, and they eventually have sex. Rubio wishes to marry her, and Lucia finds herself wishing she could, but she is still determined to go to Switzerland. They arrive at a town, and Lucia successfully haggles for a passport and money from a pawn shop. While having dinner, Rubio is stabbed when he defends a snide comment someone makes about Lucia. They run to a church, where Lucia tries her best to take care of him, but is forced to go to a hospital to take care of him. They are both arrested because the authorities recognize Rubio as a terrorist and Lucia as a criminal from Italy.

Sister Graciela and Ricardo's trip is quiet as Graciela will not talk to Ricardo despite his best efforts. Although he is exasperated with her cold shoulder, he is reluctantly starting to fall for her. It is not until she is almost attacked by a wild wolf in a cave that she begins to speak to him. She does not want to love him because of her past of falling for another man, but falls for him anyway, and they plan to marry.

Alan Tucker goes to the orphanage to find more information about Megan/Patricia, but comes to a dead end when the owner of the orphanage tells him that the date Megan arrived does not coincide with the date Patricia should have died, and continues the assignment trying to locate Megan. It is revealed that Ellen paid the owner to lie and change the dates.

Amparo is growing angry with Jaime and Megan's relationship. They hide out at a bullfight, where Megan impresses Jaime with her knowledge of the subject. They discover that Rubio and Lucia were arrested, leaving Megan shocked to find out about Lucia's past, as well as Sister Teresa's death. She is also saddened to hear about Sister Teresa's death. Megan grows sympathetic to his ideals even though she believes that violence is wrong. Jaime holds up a bank to get money to continue traveling, and Acoca nearly catches him if it were not for Megan, and he suspects Felix of betraying him. Amparo tells him that one of their friends wants them to meet in the town square, and when he leaves, Megan overhears her calling Acoca, and saves him from getting caught by pretending to be an angry wife looking for her husband. When he confronts Amparo, she tells him that she is sick of the bloodshed and how they are hurting the Basque people as well, and they keep her with the group so as not to escape.

Acoca discovers that Jaime escaped, and tricks him into meeting up in a convent. However, after reuniting with Graciela and Ricardo, he realizes that it is a trap and they head to the countryside. Jaime tricks Amparo by forcing her to take a drink with powder in it, but it is only sleeping pills and they leave while she is asleep. He persuades Megan to wait in France with his aunt until he is done fighting so they can marry, and she talks to Graciela about leaving the convent.

The next morning, they go into a Basque town to find Acoca waiting for them, as he was tipped off by Amparo when she woke up. Surrounded by Basque people, Acoca cannot kill Jaime and leaves, knowing that he will surely be killed by the people who hired him for failing his job. Alan finds Megan, telling her that Ellen has been looking for her. She promises to return to Jaime soon, and Alan realizes that she is Patricia, and Ellen had a hand at hiding the evidence.

During their wedding, Graciela stops and decides to return to the convent. Jaime's men get Rubio and Lucia out of prison by pretending be Acoca's men. Rubio and Lucia are reunited, and Lucia goes to Switzerland to collect thirteen million dollars. Megan knows the truth about her past because of Ellen, but forgives her and is eventually adopted by her. Megan learns how to run the company and inherits it after Ellen dies. Three years later, Jaime has been caught and sentenced to death. She tries to save him with good lawyers and talking to the Prime Minister, but nothing happens. The execution seems to have gone as planned, but when she opens the body bag sent to her, Jaime is in it, still alive, and it is implied that she paid the men responsible for the execution to leave the country and become wealthy men. Lucia and Rubio have settled for a simple life in the French countryside, having twin children. Sister Graciela returns to the convent, where she returns the golden cross and continues life as it was before.

== Characters ==
- Jaime Miró
- Colonel Ramón Acoca, head of the anti-ETA group GOE, sent to capture Miró.
- Reverend Mother Betina, head of the ancient Cistercian convent.
- Sister Teresa, elderly, disappointed in love and the oldest of the four escaping nuns.
- Sister Lucia, formerly Lucia Carmine, the wealthy daughter of an Italian Mafia boss, now impoverished. Lucia is on the run for murder.
- Sister Megan, an orphan who joined the convent.
- Sister Graciela, left home to become a nun.
- Ricardo Mellado and Felix Carpio, escaped terrorists.
- Byron and Susan Scott, owners of the New York company who have a child, Patricia. Byron is Milo's brother.
- Ellen and Milo Scott, executives of Byron's company.
- Alan Tucker, a former detective and Ellen's Chief of Security sent to search for the lost child, Patricia.

The Sisters

Sister Teresa is around 60, having been at the convent for 30 years. Growing up, she was always overshadowed by her stunningly beautiful younger sister Monique. However the rather plain Teresa had a lovely voice, and sang on the radio. A famous theatre director came to see her, but Monique got to him first, and he decided that compared to her sister, Teresa was too ugly to be in his show. This started a rivalry between the two sisters. Teresa fell in love with a young man named Raoul, but he eloped with her sister shortly before the wedding. Heartbroken, Teresa attempted suicide then suffered depression throughout her life. When Raoul sent her a letter stating that Monique left him with their baby and that it was Teresa he wanted all along, she decided to go into the convent because she could not face him.

Sister Lucia as Lucía Maria Carmine, daughter of an Italian Mafia boss, lost everything when her father's business crumbled. Unknown to him, Lucia slept with the chief bodyguard and many other men in their town as a teenager. Years later, the bodyguard, Benito, worked with the police to turn in Lucia's father and brothers, who worked in the family "business". In revenge, Lucia pretends to thank the judge (formerly a family friend) for putting away her father, but poisons him. Then, in prison she seduces Benito, right before stabbing him. Now exposed as a murderer, Lucia attempts to flee the country, deciding to go to Switzerland, where a hidden bank account contains her father's hidden fortune. However, on her way through Spain, she decides to hide out at the convent to hide out from the police.

Beautiful and exotic, Sister Graciela is the daughter of a woman whose fiancé left when he found out she was pregnant. Graciela's mother, also gorgeous, became a whore, resenting her daughter and sleeping with many different men. When Graciela was 14, she was attracted to her mother's current boyfriend, who was a “Moor.” They were caught having sex by Graciela's mother, who threw an iron ashtray at Graciela's head, injuring her. Convinced that she could not go back home, Graciela chose to join the convent.

Sister Megan is a tomboy who was abandoned at a farm as a baby, but then brought to an orphanage because the farmers had no money to take care of her. She developed a love of reading and learned several languages there, daydreaming about who her parents could be. When she reached the age of 15, she decided to join the convent because she loved going to church. She was known as Patricia before the airplane that they are riding crash. Her parents died, but Milo and Ellen together with Patricia, luckily survived. At the moment, Ellen see an opportunity in owning the Scott Industries so they left Patricia at the front door of a farmer in Avila. Later they found out that in the will of Milo's brother, Bryan, (owner of Scott Industry, father of Patricia) is leaving the whole company to his brother and only part of the income goes to Patricia.

== Adaption ==
The book was adapted as a two-part TV miniseries in 1992. The Sands of Time adaption starred James Brolin, Michael Nouri, Roddy McDowell, Deborah Raffin, Amanda Plummer, and Elizabeth Gracen. It was directed by Gary Nelson.
