= Kshana Kshana =

- VCD cover
- Directed by: Sunil Kumar Desai
- Written by: Sunil Kumar Desai
- Produced by: B. R. Thirumalai
- Starring: Aditya; Kiran Rathod; Prema; Vishnuvardhan
- Cinematography: R. Prabhakar
- Edited by: B. S. Kemparaju
- Music by: R. P. Patnaik
- Production company: Trans India Films Division
- Release date: 1 June 2007
- Running time: 154 minutes
- Country: India
- Language: Kannada

Kshana Kshana is a 2007 Indian Kannada language crime thriller film directed by Sunil Kumar Desai. The film stars Aditya, Prema and Kiran Rathod in the lead roles with actor Vishnuvardhan appearing in an extended cameo role.

The film was released on 2 June 2007 across Karnataka to a positive response from the critics. However upon release, the film generally met with average reviews from critics. The core storyline of the movie - the protagonist, a well-known person in their profession, fearing that they are being targeted by an unknown person who wants to kill them for their past unknown deeds, hiring a detective/bodyguard who in turn fakes few attacks on the protagonist to gain their confidence and finally the original assailant turning out to be a person very close to the protagonist - is loosely based on Sidney Sheldon's first novel The Naked Face (1970).

== Plot ==
Samarth returns from Switzerland to Thailand and eventually gets appointed as a bodyguard to the famous actress Maya. He wins over the confidence of Maya and Phalguni along with their family. The real purpose of his visit to India is to trace the psychiatrist killer of his brother and he thinks that Maya has some special relationship with the killer. He manages to almost convince her that she might be the killer of his brother when a don Kishore, who is after Maya, kidnaps her and keeps her in a remote place. Meanwhile, her friend Ananth who is aware of this entire incident, is also abducted. Then enters a specially appointed DCP Vishnu who interrogates everyone involved in this case.

== Cast ==
- Dr. Vishnuvardhan as DCP Vishnu (Extended Cameo Appearance)
- Aditya as Samarth
- Kiran Rathod as Maya
- Prema as Phalguni / Anitha
- Ashutosh Rana as Rana
- Dileep Raj as Ananth
- Kishore as Kishore
- Sridevika as Gayathri
- Sowmya as Veena
- Nagesh
- Ramesh
- Uday Jadugar
- Arun Sagar as Amith
- Ravi Bhat as Dr. Anoop

== Soundtrack ==
Kshana Kshana

Soundtrack album by R. P. Patnaik
- Released: 2007
- Genre: Film soundtrack
- Label: Anand Audio
- Producer: R. P. Patnaik

All music is composed by R. P. Patnaik.

Track listing
| No. | Title | Lyrics | Singer(s) | Length |
|---|---|---|---|---|
| 1. | "I Love You" | K. Kalyan | Rajesh Krishnan, Shreya Ghoshal | 03:46 |
| 2. | "Madira Madhura" | Kaviraj | KK, Malgudi Subha | 05:28 |
| 3. | "Ondu Kotre Eradu Kodtheeni" | K. Kalyan | Udit Narayan, K. S. Chithra | 03:56 |
| 4. | "Love Love" | K. Kalyan | Chaitra H. G. | 04:42 |
| 5. | "Ee Kshana Gharshana" | Kaviraj | Rajesh Krishnan, Sunitha Upadrashta | 04:59 |
| 6. | "Kshana Kshana" | V. Nagendra Prasad | Usha Uthup | 04:15 |

== Reception ==
R. G. Vijayasarathy of Rediff.com rated the film 2.5/5 stars and wrote, "Stylishly presented and technically brilliant, Desai ensured that the film did not suffer from vulgarity or excessive violence. However, what the film suffers from is a weak script". B S Srivani of Deccan Herald wrote, "One can see flashes of the Desai brilliance, but the task of providing ‘relief’ from serious drama seems to sap the director of his ideas. Kshana Kshana would have been better off minus all the frills".
