= The Other Side of Midnight (film) =

1977 film by Charles Jarrott

- Theatrical release poster, artwork by Ted CoConis
- Directed by: Charles Jarrott
- Screenplay by: Herman Raucher; Daniel Taradash
- Based on: The Other Side of Midnight by Sidney Sheldon
- Produced by: Frank Yablans
- Starring: Marie-France Pisier; John Beck; Susan Sarandon; Raf Vallone
- Cinematography: Fred J. Koenekamp
- Edited by: Donn Cambern; Harold F. Kress
- Music by: Michel Legrand
- Production company: Frank Yablans Presentations
- Distributed by: 20th Century-Fox
- Release date: June 8, 1977
- Running time: 165 minutes
- Country: United States
- Language: English
- Budget: $9 million
- Box office: $43 million (worldwide)

The Other Side of Midnight is a 1977 American drama film directed by Charles Jarrott and starring Marie-France Pisier, John Beck, and Susan Sarandon. Herman Raucher and Daniel Taradash wrote the screenplay based on Sidney Sheldon's 1973 novel of the same name.

Today, the film is best known as being part of a package deal 20th Century Fox's American distributors arranged to ensure a film the company had little confidence in, Star Wars, would be exhibited in its initial 1977 release. As it turned out, Star Wars was a smash success that would completely overshadow The Other Side of Midnight.

The film was panned by critics for its long runtime and melodramatic tone, and it received negative reviews by the critics.

== Plot ==
In France just before the outbreak of World War II, young Noelle Page falls in love with Larry Douglas, an American pilot in the Royal Canadian Air Force stationed in France. The couple has a torrid love affair that ends abruptly when Larry receives orders to return to the United States. Larry promises to come back for Noelle and marry her. She later finds out that she is pregnant with his child. However, he never returns.

Vowing revenge after a harrowing abortion, Noelle begins using men for their money and power. She seduces her way into becoming a famous European actress, then arranges to be the mistress of one of the world's wealthiest men, Greek tycoon Constantin Demeris, whom she does not love.

During this time, Larry has met and married Catherine Alexander, a sweet and trusting young woman from Chicago. Larry meets her in Hollywood, where she has gone to produce a film promoting military enlistment. Larry is now a United States Army Air Forces fighter pilot. He seduces the virginal Catherine with some of the same lines he used with Noelle.

After the war, Larry is employed by various civilian airlines. Noelle hires a detective to keep tabs on him, then sabotages any job Larry is able to find. Larry is in no position to refuse a job offer to come to Greece and be a private pilot, unaware that it is Noelle who is hiring him.

Larry initially fails to recognize her. Noelle treats him rudely until Larry is not sure how much more he can take. When he is positive it is her, he bursts into Noelle's hotel suite, where they rekindle their romance. Larry claims he will keep his long-ago promise and stay with her, but when his wife refuses a request for a divorce, Larry and Noelle begin to plot Catherine's murder.

They carry out their plan, but things go wrong. Larry and Noelle ultimately are convicted of murder by a Greek court, which is under the influence of Constantin Demeris. They are executed by a firing squad. Catherine has miraculously survived. Suffering from shock, she ends up living in a convent, under the patronage of Demeris.

== Cast ==
- Marie-France Pisier as Noelle Page
- John Beck as Larry Douglas
- Susan Sarandon as Catherine Alexander Douglas
- Raf Vallone as Constantin Demeris
- Clu Gulager as Bill Fraser
- Christian Marquand as Armand Gautier
- Michael Lerner as Barbet
- Sorrell Booke as Lanchon
- Antony Ponzini as Paul Metaxas
- Louis Zorich as Demonides
- Charles Cioffi as Chotas
- Howard Hesseman as O'Brien
- Titos Vandis as Presiding Judge
- Dimitra Arliss as Sister Theresa
- Josette Banzet as Madame Rosa
- George Keymas as Dr. K
- Lilyan Chauvin as Mrs. Page
- Curt Lowens as Henri Correger
- John Chappell as Doc Peterson
- Charles Siebert as Steve

== Reception ==
According to the 2004 documentary Empire of Dreams, the book's popularity was anticipated to translate to success at the box office, and 20th Century-Fox heavily promoted the film. At the same time, the studio was promoting Star Wars, which was gaining controversy for its growing expense.

Fearing that Star Wars would flop, the studio made a peremptory decision to grant prints of The Other Side of Midnight—a 2-hour-45-minute-long feature with sex and nudity—only to those theaters that agreed to book Star Wars as well.

Ultimately, The Other Side of Midnight was a disappointment at the box office. It opened nationally the weekend of June 17 to 19, when it grossed $2,031,293 from 431 theaters. Although a modest hit, its success was "nothing like Star Wars": Despite a higher budget, Star Wars ultimately grossed a then-record $221 million in the America and Canada in its first run and eventually spawned a multimedia franchise that continues to this day; The Other Side of Midnight earned $24 million.

The Other Side of Midnight holds a 25% rating on Rotten Tomatoes based on eight reviews.

== Home media ==
On March 6, 2007, about 30 years after the film was released in theaters, 20th Century Fox Home Entertainment released The Other Side of Midnight on DVD for the first time as part of Fox's Cinema Classics Collection. The DVD includes a commentary discussion with producer Frank Yablans, director Charles Jarrott, and author Sidney Sheldon, led by film historian Laurent Bouzereau, a stills gallery, and the film's theatrical trailer.

== Sequel ==
Sheldon wrote a 1990 sequel, Memories of Midnight, which was adapted into a 1991 television miniseries starring Jane Seymour as Catherine Alexander.
