= Pray TV (1982 film) =

1982 film by Robert Markowitz

- Genre: Drama
- Written by: Lane Slate
- Directed by: Robert Markowitz
- Starring: John Ritter; Ned Beatty; Richard Kiley; Madolyn Smith; Louise Latham
- Theme music composer: Dennis McCarthy
- Country of origin: United States
- Original language: English

Production
- Producer: Peter S. Greenberg
- Cinematography: Donald H. Birnkrant
- Editor: Peter Parasheles
- Running time: 100 minutes
- Production company: ABC Circle Films

Original release
- Network: ABC
- Release: February 1, 1982

Pray TV is a 1982 American Christian made-for-television drama film which aired on ABC starring John Ritter and Ned Beatty. The project garnered controversy when Rev. Jerry Falwell, the prominent televangelist, undertook a public campaign in an attempt to keep the TV movie from airing.

== Plot ==
A newly ordained minister accepts a summer job with a TV evangelist only to find conflicts between the latter's activities servicing his community's spiritual needs and his power wielded as a TV celebrity.

== Calls received to phone number ==
The telephone number advertised by Rev. Stone received 15,000 real calls.

== Cast ==
- John Ritter as Tom McPherson
- Ned Beatty as Rev. Freddy Stone
- Richard Kiley as Rev. Gus Keiffer
- Madolyn Smith as Liz Oakes
- Louise Latham as Mrs. Oakes
- Jonathan Prince as Bill Oakes
- Michael Currie as Artie Allman
- Kenneth Tigar as Parker
- Lois Hamilton as Bobbi Ellis
- Jason Bernard as Everett
- Frank Birney as Johnson
- James Keane as Fats
- Richard Kennedy as Announcer
- Mel Tormé as himself
- Devo as Dove, the Band of Love
