= Deadly Intentions =

1985 American made-for-television film

- Genre: Crime; Drama; Thriller
- Based on: Deadly Intentions by William Randolph Stevens
- Teleplay by: Andrew Peter Marin
- Directed by: Noel Black
- Starring: Michael Biehn; Madolyn Smith; Cloris Leachman; Cliff DeYoung
- Theme music composer: Georges Delerue
- Country of origin: United States
- Original language: English
- No. of episodes: 2

Production
- Executive producers: Allen S. Epstein; Ray Green
- Producer: Neil T. Maffeo
- Cinematography: Reynaldo Villalobos; Frank Watts
- Editors: David Blangsted; Robert F. Shugrue
- Running time: 200 mins
- Production company: Green-Epstein Productions

Original release
- Network: ABC
- Release: May 19 – May 20, 1985

Deadly Intentions is a 1985 American thriller television miniseries starring Michael Biehn, Madolyn Smith and Cloris Leachman. A sequel titled Deadly Intentions... Again? was released in 1991.

== Plot ==
Charles Raynor, is the outwardly "perfect" doctor husband of Katherine. But Raynor is actually a psychopath, who is carefully plotting the murder of his wife. As the horrible truth slowly dawns upon Katherine, she must find some way to prevent her murder—and to alert disbelieving authorities of her husband's duplicity.

== Cast ==
- Michael Biehn as Charles Raynor
- Madolyn Smith as Katherine Raynor
- Cloris Leachman as Charlotte Raynor
- Morgana King as Anna Livanos
- Jack Kruschen as Alex Livanos
- Kevin McCarthy as Reichman
- Cliff DeYoung as Garner
- Edward Edwards as Tom Horner
- Bruce French as Dr. Reston
- Robert Clarke as Pharmacist
- Dennis Haskins as Airline Attendant
- Kimberly Beck as Sally Raynor
- Michael Currie as Dr. Lawrence
- Sagan Lewis as Barbara

== Inspiration ==
Based on a true story, Deadly Intentions first took shape as a book by William Randolph Stevens.

== See also ==
- List of television films produced for American Broadcasting Company
