= Sidney Sheldon's Mistress of the Game =

2009 novel by Sidney Sheldon and Tilly Bagshawe

- First edition
- Author: Sidney Sheldon; Tilly Bagshawe
- Language: English
- Genre: Thriller
- Publisher: William Morrow
- Publication date: August 4, 2009
- Publication place: United States
- Media type: Print (Hardback)
- Pages: 336
- ISBN: 0-06-172838-1
- Preceded by: Master of the Game
- Followed by: Sidney Sheldon's After the Darkness

Sidney Sheldon's Mistress of the Game is a 2009 novel by Tilly Bagshawe. It is the sequel to Sidney Sheldon's critically acclaimed 1982 novel Master of the Game, which had debuted at number one on the New York Times Bestseller List and was later adapted into a 1984 television miniseries. Mistress of the Game continues the story of the powerful Blackwell family as the lifelong conflict between twins Eve and Alexandra extends to their children.

== Plot ==
Following the death of Kate Blackwell, her twin granddaughters, Eve Blackwell-Webster and Alexandra Blackwell-Templeton, give birth on the same day. Eve, vowing revenge at her whole family, gives birth to Max, whom she raises to hate his father and relatives. Alexandra gives birth to Alexandra "Lexi" Templeton, but dies from complications. Lexi is raised in a loving household with her father Peter and her brother Robbie. As a child, Lexi is kidnapped and raped, and while she is rescued, an explosion leaves her completely deaf.

On their joint eighteen birthday, Max is jealous of Lexi's easy ability to draw Kruger-Brent's board members to her. Robbie, a successful pianist, plans to give his share of the company to Lexi, which would make her 2/3 in control of the company when she turns twenty-five. Eve sends Max to seduce her, forming a romantic relationship with her and sending her to a doctor to cure her hearing. Lexi lets her guard down and willingly gives him the code to her safe, where he finds a memory card filled with racy pictures from her college days and leaks it to the public. The board members unanimously agree to terminate Lexi from Kruger-Brent, giving full control to Max. However, after a year, Lexi's new company "Templeton" restores her professional reputation and outshines Kruger-Brent, which is failing due to Max's unsteady control.

Templeton's African branch comes into conflict with Phoenix Industries, owned by her distant relative, Gabriel McGregor. Though mutually attracted to each other, Gabriel refuses to cheat on his wife, and they agree to be business partners. Gabriel falls into depression after his family is murdered, and he and Lexi form a relationship. Gabriel disapproves of Lexi's obsession with Kruger-Brent, despite Lexi's promises to forget about it. However, she steals from Gabriel's charity fund to buy out most of its companies and causing it to go bankrupt despite Max and Eve's attempts. Max commits suicide. The Kruger-Brent board members agree to sell to Lexi, who restores the company back to its power. Gabriel finds out about her theft and breaks up with her before she can inform him of her pregnancy. But before she can abort the baby, Gabriel returns and reconciles with her, and they marry after the birth of their daughter, Maxine.

Eve, on her deathbed, hallucinates the ghosts of people in her past. She sends a threatening note to Lexi admitting that she knows what she did and has sent another note to the police. The police take Lexi to the police station after her wedding, but Gabriel, Robbie, and two of their loyal servants help her escape to her villa in Maldives with Gabriel and Maxine, where she is hopeful for the future knowing that, unlike Eve, she can still play the game.
