= Stephanie Faracy =

American actress (born 1951 or 1952)

- Born: 1951 or 1952 (age 74–75)
- Occupation: Actress
- Years active: 1976–present

Stephanie Faracy (born 1951 or 1952) is an American actress. She is known for playing supporting roles in films including Heaven Can Wait (1978), Scavenger Hunt (1979), Blind Date (1987), The Great Outdoors (1988), Hocus Pocus (1993), Sideways (2004), Flightplan (2005), and Mike and Dave Need Wedding Dates (2016). On television, Faracy has had leading roles in a number of sitcoms, most significantly True Colors (1990–92). She currently plays Lynn on the series Nobody Wants This (2024–present).

== Life and career ==
Faracy was raised in Elk Grove Village, Illinois, where she attended high school. She studied acting at Illinois Wesleyan University and Yale School of Drama. She began her acting career in New York stage, and in 1976, made her television debut in an episode of ABC sitcom Laverne & Shirley.

She went to star in two unsold sitcom pilots, before playing Corinne in the 1978 comedy film Heaven Can Wait. The following year, Faracy played Angel Childress in the film When You Comin' Back, Red Ryder?, and Babbette in the comedy film Scavenger Hunt.

Faracy has a long-running career on television. From 1979 to 1980, she starred in the CBS sitcom The Last Resort. From 1983 to 1984, she co-starred alongside Bill Bixby and Mariette Hartley in Goodnight, Beantown. Also during the 1980s, Faracy had roles on several miniseries, include The Thorn Birds (1983, as Mary Carson's servant, Judy), Space (1985), and Windmills of the Gods (1988).

In film, she co-starred alongside Bruce Willis and Kim Basinger in the 1987 romantic comedy film Blind Date, and the following year, she played John Candy's wife in the comedy film The Great Outdoors.

In 1990, Faracy starred alongside Martin Mull in the sitcom His & Hers. Later that year, she began starring in the Fox sitcom True Colors about an interracial marriage.

The following years, Faracy continued her career, appearing in supporting roles in both film and television. She has guest-starred on Touched by an Angel, Wings, Murphy Brown, Will & Grace, Frasier, Grey's Anatomy, Ugly Betty, How I Met Your Mother, Castle, Desperate Housewives, Modern Family, How to Get Away with Murder, and The Goldbergs. In 2016, she had a recurring role on the Lifetime comedy-drama series Devious Maids. In 2022, she played Lisa Lawson on the comedy series Uncoupled.

Her film credits include Hocus Pocus (1993), Sideways (2004), Surviving Christmas (2004), Flightplan (2005), Get Him to the Greek (2010), Bad Teacher (2011), and Mike and Dave Need Wedding Dates (2016).

== Filmography ==
=== Film ===
Year	Title	Role	Notes
1978	Heaven Can Wait	Corinne	
1979	When You Comin' Back, Red Ryder?	Angel Childress	
1979	Scavenger Hunt	Babbette	
1987	Blind Date	Susie Davis	
1988	The Great Outdoors	Connie Ripley	
1993	Hocus Pocus	Jenny Dennison	
1994	Family Portrait	Jane Janáček	Short
2004	Sideways	Stephanie's Mother	
2004	Surviving Christmas	Letitia Vangilder	
2005	Flightplan	Anna	
2010	Get Him to the Greek	Wendy	
2011	Bad Teacher	Mrs. Pubich	
2014	Stuck	Stella	
2016	Mike and Dave Need Wedding Dates	Rosie Stangle	

=== Television ===
Year	Title	Role	Notes
1976	Laverne & Shirley	Debra Lee	episode: "Excuse Me, May I Cut In?"
1977	Bumpers	Rozzie Webber	unsold TV pilot
1978	The Fighting Nightingales	Lt. Hope Phillips	TV film
1979–1980	The Last Resort	Gail Collins	main role
1981	Trapper John, M.D.	Lisa Holloway	episode: "Have I Got a Girl for You"
1981	Stephanie	Stephanie	TV film
1981	Insight	Donna	episode: "Little Miseries"
1983	Private Benjamin	Sherry Stern	episode: "Judy's Cousin"
1983	The Thorn Birds	Judy	TV miniseries
1983	Carpool	Jennifer O'Connor	TV film
1983	Fantasy Island	Deborah Barnes	1 episode
1983	Hotel	Judy Gillette	episode: "Hotel"
1983–1984	Goodnight, Beantown	Valerie Wood	main role
1984	Mama Malone	Gina	episode: "The Commitment"
1984	Goldie and the Bears	Goldie Hawkins	TV film
1984	The Love Boat	Honey Malloy	1 episode
1985	Eye to Eye	Tracy Doyle	main character, 7 episodes
1985	Space	Debbie Dee Claggett	TV miniseries
1986	Classified Love	Kate Harris	TV film
1986	American Geisha	Katy	TV film
1986	Magnum, P.I.	Amy Sayler	episode: "Novel Connection"
1986	Murder, She Wrote	Amy Salyer	episode: "Magnum on Ice"
1987	Hotel	Janice Fletcher	episode: "Class of '72"
1988	Windmills of the Gods	Florence Schiffer	TV miniseries
1989	Bridesmaids	Beth	TV film
1990	His & Hers	Dr. Regina 'Reggie' Hewitt	main role
1990–1992	True Colors	Ellen Freeman	main role
1993	Tales of the City	Candi Moretti	TV miniseries
1993	The Only Way Out	Lynn	TV film
1996	Silk Stalkings	Gloria Hemmings	episode: "Family Values"
1996	Touched by an Angel	Sally Redding	episode: "The Quality of Mercy"
1996	Run for the Dream: The Gail Devers Story	Dr. Otis	TV film
1996	Wings	Carol	episode: "Single and Hating It"
1996	Dark Skies	Joan Sayers	episode: "Hostile Convergence"
1996–1998	The Fantastic Voyages of Sinbad the Sailor	(voice)	regular role
1997	Murphy Brown	Carole Fordham	episode: "And That's the Way It Was?"
1997	Pauly	Pamela	episode: "Foreplay"
1997	Boston Common	Lucy Cross	episode: "A Cross to Bear"
1997	Chicago Hope	Myra Dolan	episode: "All in the Family"
1997	Frasier	Mimi	episode: "Voyage of the Damned"
1998	The Pretender	Joyce Cullman	episode: "Gigolo Jarod"
1998	Safety Patrol	Mrs. Marlowe	TV film
1998	Caroline in the City	Faye	episode: "Caroline and the Sandwich"
1999	Maggie Winters	Lucille	episode: "Sometimes You Feel Like a Nut"
1999	The Rockford Files: If It Bleeds... It Leads	Selma Drown	TV film
1999	The Lot	Mary Parker	main role
2000	Stark Raving Mad	Elizabeth Daryl	episode: "Dog Gone"
2000	Any Day Now	Mrs. Adams	episode: "Where's the Justice in That?"
2001	Bette	Mrs. Flynn	episode: "The Invisible Mom"
2001	Providence	Nancy Moore	episode: "Best Man"
2002	The Johnny Chronicles	Linda Monroe	TV film
2003	Charlie Lawrence	Suzette Michaels	main role
2003	Will & Grace	Eva	episode: "Nice in White Satin"
2004	Frasier	Mimi	episode: "Boo!"
2004	Silver Lake	Maureen Patterson	TV film
2005	Out of Practice	Laura	episode: "Key Ingredients"
2005	Stacked	Stella	episode: "Heavy Meddle"
2005	Blue Skies	Pat	TV film
2006	Grey's Anatomy	Mrs. Sullivan	episode: "What I Am"
2006	Separated at Worth	The Mother	TV film
2007	Ugly Betty	Mrs. Tanen	episode: "How Betty Got Her Grieve Back"
2007	ER	Angie	Episode: "Gravity"
2007	How I Met Your Mother	Rhonda	episode: "The Yips"
2008	The New Adventures of Old Christine	Dr. Jacobson	episode: "Between a Rock and a Hard Place"
2008	Back to You	Peg McGinley	episode: "The Wall of Fame"
2009	In the Mix	Judy	TV film
2009	Castle	Patty Schultz	episode: "Fool Me Once..."
2010	Temple Grandin	Betty Goscowitz	TV film
2010	$#*! My Dad Says	Marla Brooks	episode: "Code Ed"
2011	Desperate Housewives	Miss Charlotte	episodes: "Assassins", "Where Do I Belong?"
2012	Modern Family	Dottie	episode: "Election Day"
2012	Happily Divorced	Jane	episode: "Fran-alyze This"
2013	Mary and Martha	Head of Committee	TV film
2013	Dog with a Blog	Grandma James	episode: "Stan Talks to Gran"
2014	The Crazy Ones	Judy	episode: "Simon Roberts Was Here"
2014	Friends with Better Lives	Barbara	episode: "Cyrano de Trainer-Zac"
2015	Togetherness	Kris	episode: "Houston, We Have a Problem"
2016	Devious Maids	Frances	recurring role (season 4)
2016–2017	How to Get Away with Murder	Ellen Freeman	episodes: "Don't Tell Annalise", "Is Someone Really Dead?", "I'm Going Away"
2019	Sneaky Pete	Dotti	recurring role (season 3)
2021	The Goldbergs	Joyce	episode: "A Light Thanksgiving Nosh"
2022	Uncoupled	Lisa Lawson	2 episodes
2024	Nobody Wants This	Lynn	Recurring role
2026	Scarpetta		Post-production
