= The Naked Face =

1970 novel by Sidney Sheldon

- First edition cover with quote from Irving Wallace
- Author: Sidney Sheldon
- Genre: Thriller
- Publisher: William Morrow (US); Hodder & Stoughton (UK)
- Publication date: 1970
- Pages: 320
- ISBN: 0-446-34191-6
- OCLC: 10358523

The Naked Face is the first novel (1970) written by Sidney Sheldon. It was nominated by the Mystery Writers of America for the Edgar Allan Poe Award for Best First Novel by an American author.

== Plot summary ==
Dr. Judd Stevens, M.D., is a caring and successful Manhattan psychoanalyst who must face a horrific prospect; someone is trying to kill him. First, John Hanson, a patient trying to overcome his homosexuality, is murdered. Not long after, Carol Roberts, Stevens' secretary, is found tortured to death. Two police officers, Andrew McGreavy and Frank Angeli, are quick to treat Stevens as the prime suspect, partly due to McGreavy's anger over Stevens' testimony in a previous case. Stevens is later run down by a car, and following his recovery, two men in dark try to kill him in his office.

To prove his innocence and track down the real killer, Stevens hires a private investigator by the name of Norman Z. Moody. He also suspects some of his patients: Harrison Burke (a homicidal paranoiac), Anne Blake (a mysterious patient with whom Stevens is in love) and Teri Washburn (a sex addict and former Hollywood actress). Influenced by Angeli (the one who is somewhat friendly and helpful to him), Stevens begins to consider Moody as a suspect.

However, Moody dies but not before giving a hint on the killer: Don Vinton. Another murder is attempted on Stevens, but he outsmarts the attackers. McGreavy, along with his police force tries to catch Stevens but he escapes and eventually realises that Don Vinton, in Italian, means the Big Man, a title given to the leader of a criminal syndicate: La Cosa Nostra.

He contacts Angeli, who lures him to Anthony DeMarco (a capo of La Cosa Nostra and a megalomaniac), who is revealed to be Anne's husband. He tries to extract information about Anne's sessions with Stevens and forces him to convince Anne to go with her husband (DeMarco) to Europe. It is revealed that he killed Hanson (mistaking him for Stevens) and Carol (to extract information about Anne).

After a struggle at a factory, Stevens manages to kill DeMarco and is rescued by McGreavy.

== Adaptations ==
In 1984 the novel was adapted as a film directed by Bryan Forbes, starring Roger Moore and Rod Steiger. The second adaptation is the Ukrainian feature-length film Sheriff's Star (Zirka Sheryfa) in 1992, directed by Mykola Litus and starring Irina Alfyorova, Arnis Līcītis and Sergei Martynov.

In 2007, Sunil Kumar Desai directed the Indian Kannada film Kshana Kshana which is based on this novel.
