= Eye to Eye (American TV series) =

- Created by: Rich Eustis; Michael Elias
- Based on: The Late Show by Robert Benton
- Starring: Charles Durning; Stephanie Faracy
- Composer: Jimmie Haskell
- Country of origin: United States
- Original language: English
- No. of seasons: 1
- No. of episodes: 6

Production
- Running time: 60 minutes
- Production company: Warner Bros. Television

Original release
- Network: ABC
- Release: March 21 – May 2, 1985

Eye to Eye is a 1985 American detective drama series that aired on Thursday nights from March 21 to May 2, 1985.

== Premise ==
When the ex-partner of semi-retired private eye Oscar Poole is murdered, the man's daughter, Tracy Doyle, becomes Oscar's new partner.

== Cast ==
- Charles Durning as Oscar Poole
- Stephanie Faracy as Tracy Doyle

== Episodes ==
No.	Title	Directed by	Written by	Original release date
1	"Pilot"	Roger Young	Michael Elias & Rich Eustis	March 21, 1985
2	"Singin' the Blues"	Cliff Bole	Robert McKee	March 28, 1985
3	"The Suicide"	Don Weis	Alan Rosen	April 4, 1985
4	"Dumb Death of a Blonde"	William Wiard	Julie Friedgen	April 11, 1985
5	"A Crossword Puzzle"	Cliff Bole	Alan Rosen	April 18, 1985
6	"Hide and Seek"	Vincent McEveety	George Lee Marshall	May 2, 1985
