= Bloodline (1979 film) =

Film by Terence Young

- Theatrical release poster
- Directed by: Terence Young
- Screenplay by: Laird Koenig
- Based on: Bloodline by Sidney Sheldon
- Produced by: David V. Picker; Sidney Beckerman
- Starring: Audrey Hepburn; Ben Gazzara; James Mason; Claudia Mori; Irene Papas; Michelle Phillips; Maurice Ronet; Romy Schneider; Omar Sharif; Beatrice Straight; Gert Fröbe
- Cinematography: Freddie Young
- Edited by: Bud Molin
- Music by: Ennio Morricone
- Distributed by: Paramount Pictures (United States); CIC (West Germany)
- Release dates: June 29, 1979 (United States); December 20, 1979 (West Germany)
- Running time: 116 minutes (Note: The original theatrical runtime is 116 minutes, but a 141-minute extended cut was created for television. This cut was released along with the theatrical cut in 2024, as part of a collector's edition Blu-ray by Vinegar Syndrome.)
- Countries: United States; West Germany
- Language: English
- Budget: $12 million
- Box office: $8.2 million

Bloodline (also known as Sidney Sheldon's Bloodline) is a 1979 thriller film directed by Terence Young and starring Audrey Hepburn, Ben Gazzara, James Mason, Claudia Mori, Irene Papas, Michelle Phillips, Maurice Ronet, and Romy Schneider. Adapted by Laird Koenig from the 1977 novel of the same name by Sidney Sheldon, it follows international pharmaceutical heiress Elizabeth Roffe who is targeted for death by unknown members of her extended family, while a serial killer simultaneously crisscrosses Europe, murdering women in snuff films. It was the only R-rated film ever made by Hepburn. Bloodline was the second film Hepburn made after coming back from an eight-year retirement from acting. Despite this, it was her first film in three years since her comeback role in Robin And Marian (1976).

== Plot ==
Sam Roffe, President of Roffe & Sons Pharmaceuticals, dies in what appears to be a mountain climbing accident, leaving his daughter Elizabeth a billion-dollar empire. Roffe's board members see an opportunity to settle old scores, jockey for higher position, and reap lucrative profits. However, an investigation into Sam's death discloses that it was a murder and that a power struggle is going on within the company.

Lead investigator Max Hornung informs Elizabeth of his list of suspects, which includes her closest advisers and financially strapped family members. During this time, she marries CEO Rhys Williams, but he, too, is identified by Hornung as a suspect. As president, Elizabeth follows her father's wishes and refuses to let shares of Roffe & Sons sell on the world market. Her choice prevents the board members from selling their shares, as the company's by-laws prohibit it until all board members agree; on the other hand, her death would allow for a unanimous decision.

After several attempts on Elizabeth's life, an international chase across Europe ensues. Hornung is able to connect these murder attempts to a series of homicides of prostitutes, which have been recorded on snuff films by using Roffe film stock. He has a witness in a black Gucci leather coat (several suspects are linked to this coat).

Elizabeth returns to her father's villa in Sardinia during a sirocco for protection from the unseen murderer, who sets her house on fire and shouts "Now try to make it look like an accident!" Rhys and one of the shareholders, Sir Alec Nichols, both show up to save her, but Hornung figures out that Sir Alec is the killer and shoots him dead before he can murder Elizabeth in a symbolic snuff film. As Hornung had previously discovered, Sir Alec, a prominent British politician, was heavily in debt due to his young wife Vivian's gambling addiction. Elizabeth ultimately embraces Rhys.

== Cast ==
- Audrey Hepburn as Elizabeth Roffe
- Ben Gazzara as Rhys Williams
- James Mason as Sir Alec Nichols
- Claudia Mori as Donatella
- Irene Papas as Simonetta Palazzi
- Michelle Phillips as Vivian Nichols
- Maurice Ronet as Charles Martin
- Romy Schneider as Hélène Martin
- Omar Sharif as Ivo Palazzi
- Beatrice Straight as Kate Erling
- Gert Fröbe as Inspector Max Hornung
- Marcel Bozzuffi as Man In Black
- Pinkas Braun as Dr. Wal
- Ivan Desny as Jeweler
- Vadim Glowna as Dr. Joeppli
- Walter Kohut as Krauss
- Wolfgang Preiss as Julius Prager
- Maurice Colbourne as Jon Swinton
- Charles Millot as Commissaire Bloche
- Hans von Borsody as Peasant Guard
- Guy Rolfe as Tod Michaels

== Production ==
Paramount paid Sidney Sheldon $1.25 million plus ten percent of the box office gross for the film rights to his novel before it was published. According to producer Sidney Beckerman, this was a record sum paid by a film studio for the rights to a book until Peter Benchley was paid a reported $2 million for the film rights to The Island a short time later. John Frankenheimer was originally set to direct, but left the project to work on Prophecy instead and was replaced by Terence Young. Jacqueline Bisset was approached about playing the lead role, but it went instead to Audrey Hepburn, who was considerably older than Elizabeth Roffe in the novel so the part was rewritten for her. Hepburn was paid a $1.25 million salary plus ten percent of the box office gross.

=== Filming ===
Principal photography took place from October 8 to December 22, 1978, in New York City, London, Surrey, Paris, Sardinia, Rome and several locations in West Germany. Hepburn was 49 years old during filming, and according to IMDb, Elizebeth's character age was originally supposed to be 23. However, when Hepburn signed onto the role, the character age was changed to 35, though on film she appears to be much older still.

== Extended version ==
An extended version running 141 minutes was created for network TV broadcast. This cut removes almost all of the serial killer plot thread.

== Release ==
Bloodline was given a theatrical release in the United States on June 29, 1979.

=== Home media ===
Paramount Home Entertainment released Bloodline on VHS in 1980. A DVD edition of the film was never released. In September 2024, Vinegar Syndrome released the film on Blu-ray for the first time in a two-disc set featuring both the theatrical cut and the extended 155-minute television cut.

== Reception ==
=== Box office ===
Bloodline grossed a total of $8,218,695 at the U.S. box office during its original theatrical run in the summer of 1979.

=== Critical response ===
Vincent Canby of The New York Times wrote, "As he demonstrated in his James Bond films (Dr. No, From Russia With Love and Thunderball), Terence Young is a director of some comic style, but though Bloodline is often laughable, it has no sense of humor. It's the kind of fiction that is glumly disapproving of its own sordid details, such as one about a lady who has her knees nailed to the floor (offscreen) for not paying her gambling debts." Roger Ebert wrote, "After six months, a week, and two days of suspense, we can now relax: The worst movie of 1979 has opened ... See Sidney Sheldon's Bloodline, and weep for the cinema." Gene Siskel of the Chicago Tribune gave the film one-and-a-half stars out of four and called it "trash", writing of Hepburn that "she has so much class that you sit there wondering what a woman like her is doing in a movie like this." Variety stated, "Bloodline is bloodless. With a plot that becomes more ludicrous the more one thinks about it, this Geria production for Par release plays woodenly."

Kevin Thomas of the Los Angeles Times wrote, "As an unabashed potboiler it's suitably lurid and preposterous, but unfortunately it merely simmers. The task of making clear the heavily populated, incredibly thick plot of Sheldon's best seller requires so much exposition—and so much zigzagging over Europe—that adaptor Laird Koenig and director Terence Young have scant opportunity to develop characters or work in much action. It's amusing but isn't nearly as much fun as pictures of this kind should be." Gary Arnold of The Washington Post called the film "surely one of the most perfunctory murder mysteries ever committed to foolscap. Not a bloody thing ever develops. After lining up the characters, Sheldon doggedly shifts scenes, suspects and red herrings until accumulating enough pages to call it a hefty read." Jack Kroll wrote in Newsweek that "if I were Sidney Sheldon, I'd demand to have my name removed from the title of this torpid turkey ... Junk movies should be fun – this one is just dumb."
