= The Rose and the Jackal =

- Directed by: Jack Gold
- Screenplay by: Eric Edson
- Produced by: Wendy Dytman; Paula Weinstein; Steve White; Stratton Leopold
- Starring: Christopher Reeve; Madolyn Smith; Granville Van Dusen; Carrie Snodgress; Kevin McCarthy
- Cinematography: Dietrich Lohmann
- Music by: Michael J. Lewis
- Production company: Turner Network Television
- Release date: April 16, 1990
- Running time: 100 minutes
- Country: United States
- Language: English

The Rose and the Jackal is a 1990 American made-for-television Western adventure film produced by TNT starring Christopher Reeve and Madolyn Smith. The plot revolves around Union agent Allan Pinkerton, played by Reeve, falling in love with female spy Rose O'Neal Greenhow.

The film's title served as the inspiration for the name of the Order of the Confederate Rose, a women's auxiliary to the Sons of Confederate Veterans.
