= Sidney Sheldon's After the Darkness =

2010 novel by Tilly Bagshawe

- First edition
- Author: Tilly Bagshawe
- Language: English
- Genre: Thriller novel
- Publisher: William Morrow
- Publication date: May 25, 2010
- Publication place: United States
- Media type: Print (Hardback)
- Pages: 352
- ISBN: 978-0-06-172830-3
- Preceded by: Sidney Sheldon's Mistress of the Game
- Followed by: Sidney Sheldon's Angel of the Dark

Sidney Sheldon's After the Darkness is a 2010 thriller novel written by Tilly Bagshawe and published under the name of Sidney Sheldon, who died in 2007. The second novel Bagshawe wrote in continuation of Sheldon's work, after Sidney Sheldon's Mistress of the Game (2009), it was published in the United States by William Morrow on May 25, 2010. The story concerns Grace Brookstein, a young New York socialite convicted of fraud after her financier husband disappears at sea and $75 billion goes missing from his hedge fund.

== Background ==
After Sheldon's death in 2007, his family commissioned Bagshawe to continue producing novels under his name. Bagshawe said that she read through Sheldon's body of work in preparation and tried "to be true to him and sound like his voice". HarperCollins promoted the book as a story for "the post-Bernie Madoff era", alluding to the Madoff investment scandal that had surfaced in 2008, and published a separate British edition.

== Plot ==
Grace Brookstein lives in luxury during the financial crisis in the United States. Her husband, the billionaire financier Lenny Brookstein, sails from their Nantucket estate and disappears in a storm. A body washes ashore more than a month later and, with $75 billion reported missing from the Quorum, the hedge fund Lenny founded and Grace co-owns, the coroner rules his death a suicide. Grace is arrested, convicted of fraud, money laundering and perjury, and imprisoned at Bedford Hills.

Abandoned by her sisters after the conviction, Grace attempts suicide in prison and survives. With help from two cellmates she escapes, intending to prove that Lenny was framed. Detective Mitch Connors leads the pursuit but comes to doubt the case against her, and a private investigator's review of the autopsy convinces Grace that the recovered body had been mutilated and that Lenny was murdered. She concludes that John Merrivale, Lenny's partner at Quorum, stole the money, killed Lenny and engineered her conviction, and she traces him to a remote estate in Madagascar.

There she finds Lenny alive. He reveals that the missing fortune never existed: Quorum had been insolvent since around 2004, its losses concealed behind falsified accounts while the remaining cash paid dividends and redemptions. When the 2008 crash set off a run on the fund, Lenny and Merrivale staged his suicide, murdering a homeless man and disfiguring the body so that it would be identified as Lenny's, and left Grace to take the blame. Grace shoots and wounds Lenny. In the gunfight that follows, Merrivale critically wounds Connors and is killed by police; Grace is also injured.

Returned to the United States, Lenny is tried for fraud and murder and sentenced to death; he waives his appeals and is executed. Grace receives a presidential pardon. Once Connors recovers, she declines his marriage proposal, agreeing only to a dinner, and in the epilogue she walks off into the anonymity of New York.

== Reception ==
Publishers Weekly called the book an "absorbing, if overheated" thriller that turns a sheltered rich wife into an avenger, and judged that readers of Sheldon's own novels would find few connections to them. Reviewing the novel for MyShelf.com, Elise Cooper found that Bagshawe convincingly reproduced Sheldon's clipped, plot-driven style and credited the book with an ending readers would not anticipate, though she argued the story would have been stronger without the subplot of an investigator who descends into murderous obsession.
