= After Darkness =

After Darkness may refer to:

- After Darkness (1985 film), a Swiss horror film
- After Darkness (2019 film), an American-Mexican science fiction film
- After Darkness (novel), a 2014 novel by Christine Piper

== See also ==
- After the Darkness (disambiguation)
