= Are You Afraid of the Dark? (novel) =

Novel by Sidney Sheldon

- First edition
- Author: Sidney Sheldon
- Language: English
- Genre: Thriller
- Publisher: William Morrow
- Publication date: 2004
- Pages: 337
- ISBN: 0-06-055934-9
- OCLC: 54365479
- Dewey Decimal: 813/.54 22
- LC Class: PS3569.H3927 A83 2004
- Preceded by: The Sky is Falling

Are You Afraid of the Dark? is a 2004 novel and the last novel by bestselling thriller writer Sidney Sheldon.

== Plot ==
Four people die separately in four different accidents in four different places across the world - Richard Stevens in New York, Mark Harris in Paris, Franz Verbrugge in Berlin and Gary Reynolds in Denver. The four dead share a crucial link: they work for a powerful think tank, headed by Tanner Kingsley. Two women Diane Stevens and Kelly Harris - the widows of Richard Stevens and Mark Harris respectively, run into each other in New York. They both had just met with Tanner Kinglsey to discuss about their husbands' death. To know more about Kelly and her husband's case, Diane invites her to a cafe to talk. In the cafe they are attacked by goons and they flee to Diane's apartment. They soon realise that even the apartment is not safe, so they escape to a hotel.

Soon, the two find themselves under ruthless attack wherever they go. They deduce that Tanner Kingsley is behind all this. It turns out that there is a connection between the deaths of their husbands and that of Gary Reynolds and Franz Verbrugge. Prior to their death, they had been working on a project Prima - a machine that could control the weather. Upon realizing the threat that it could pose to the world, they decide to meet a senator to talk about it. Tanner Kingsley gets to know of this plan and has the four of them killed, making it look like accidents.

Armed with this knowledge, the two women travel to Long Island to meet with the senator. Upon reaching there, they realise that the senator, who is an ex-lover of Tanner, was in on the whole plan of killing the four men and also knew about Prima. Tanner orders his bodyguard Flint to kill the two women, but Kelly gets the better of Flint and kills him. The two women hide in an inn run by an old acquaintance of Kelly, Grace. To make the whole world know of Tanner's plan to control the weather, Diane and Kelly inform various newspaper agencies about it, in the pretense of an invitation to the 'Prima Unveiling Party'. Not wanting any media attention on his machine, Tanner plans to have it destroyed by his once brilliant, now deranged brother Andrew. Tanner has another version of the machine - Prima II hidden in the Tamoa Island in the South Pacific. Tanner plans to operate it discreetly and control governments across the world.

When Tanner and the senator are on a flight, they are caught in an unexpected electrical storm which kills them. It is later revealed that the storm was created by Andrew, who ultimately destroys Prima and dies in the process. Upon learning of this news, the two women decide to go together to Washington to the FBI, to tell them what they know. The book ends with Diane and Kelly who have grown close in the sequence of events, getting closure for their husbands' death.
