= Bloodline (Sheldon novel) =

1977 novel by Sidney Sheldon

- First edition
- Author: Sidney Sheldon
- Language: English
- Genre: Thriller
- Publisher: William Morrow
- Publication date: 1977
- Publication place: United States
- English publication date: 1977

Bloodline is a 1977 novel by American writer Sidney Sheldon. The book was at near the top of 1978's The New York Times Best Seller list.

== Plot ==
Roffe and Sons is a family firm, an international empire filled with desperate, cash-hungry family members. The family consists of

- Anna Roffe, whose husband Walther Gassner married her only because of her bloodline
- Simonetta, the wife of Ivo Palazzi, a womanizer being blackmailed by his mistress, Donatella
- Helene Roffe, the three time divorcee who marries Charles Martel. Martel invests in a vineyard by stealing his wife's jewelry, but the money drowns.
- Alec Nichols, whose mother was a Roffe, whose gambling-addicted and spendthrift wife Vivian, pushes him into increasing debts.

It is clear that everyone in the family is in need of money. The firm Roffe and Sons is managed by Sam Roffe and his assistant Rhys Williams. Sam Roffe was expecting a son, but instead got a daughter, Elizabeth. Elizabeth was declined love from her father during childhood, but escaped the reality by reading about her great-great grandfather, Samuel Roffe.

Samuel Roffe was born in a Jewish ghetto, which was systematically and strictly controlled by officials. The ghetto gate was opened after sunrise and locked before sunset. Anyone caught outside the gate after sunset was captured and sent to prison camps. In the midst of this chaos, along with the trauma of his mother's death, Samuel Roffe aspires to become a doctor. He wanders around the Wal house, the house of a rich Jewish doctor, and falls for his daughter. Wal accepts to teach him about medicine, and Samuel learns a lot. But later, Wal's daughter's marriage is fixed, which she rejects as she believes she is in love with Samuel. The Wals give Samuel six months to prove himself worthy of his daughter's hand, and he manages to do that by making a vaccine.

The bloodline goes on, to reach the present situation, with Roffe and Sons being the second largest company in the world. Elizabeth is sent to a Swiss boarding school, and later expected to host parties like her mother. She does not get involved in the family business, until she receives the news that her father died in a hiking accident.

All the money-hungry family members ask her to sell the stocks and make the company public, but Elizabeth refuses, sensing that her father was against making the company public. She later discovers in a confidential report that someone is sabotaging the company. She narrowly escapes death twice: once in a car accident and another in a lift accident, in which her secretary dies. While searching for the culprit, she falls for Rhys Williams.

Rhys and Elizabeth later get married as Elizabeth could not handle the company on her own so she insisted on marrying Rhys Williams who would become the president of the company. With Rhys Williams handling the company, Elizabeth investigates on who is sabotaging the company. In Zurich Kriminalpolizei, detective Max Hornung is assigned with the investigation of the lift accident targeted on Elizabeth. After further investigation, Max suspects one of Elizabeth's family members to be the culprit .

Meanwhile, Elizabeth comes to a conclusion that Rhys Williams is the murderer of her father based on the research she does herself. To be safe, Elizabeth flees to her villa in Sardinia where she is escorted by a police chief. Later, she wakes up to find out that she was drugged and the power supply has been cutoff in the house. Amidst the darkness, she hears the footsteps of her killer approaching, and she runs towards a tower and climbs into it.

After a dramatic climax, Elizabeth finds out that her killer was none other than Alec who wants to kill Elizabeth in order to sell the stock to repay off his debts. Alec threatens to kill Elizabeth by pointing a gun at her, but detective Hornung and Rhys Williams arrive just in time with the police chief and save Elizabeth. Alec perishes in the fire he himself set to the villa, thinking about his wife Vivian and the murders he committed of young girls with a red ribbon tied around their necks for her.

== Film adaptation ==
In 1979, a motion picture adaptation of Bloodline was released starring Audrey Hepburn as Elizabeth. Since the 50-year-old Hepburn was considerably older than Sheldon's character, Sheldon revised his novel to place the literary version of Elizabeth into the same age range as the actress. The film adaptation was a critical and box office failure.
