= The Best Laid Plans (novel) =

1997 thriller novel by Sidney Sheldon

- First edition
- Author: Sidney Sheldon
- Language: English
- Genre: suspense, thriller
- Publisher: William Morrow
- Publication date: Sep 1997
- Publication place: United States
- Pages: 384
- ISBN: 0-688-14911-1

The Best Laid Plans is a 1997 thriller novel by Sidney Sheldon. The story details the rise of a handsome, charismatic attorney named Oliver Russel, to political fame, while his jilted fiancée, Leslie Stewart, grows a media empire to eventually destroy his career and image. Possible inspiration for the title comes from a paraphrasing of the Robert Burns poem "To a Mouse" into modern English.

== Synopsis ==
The novel begins with an introduction to Leslie Stewart, one of the protagonists of the book, from her childhood to her current occupation as an advertising executive in Lexington, Kentucky. Her firm picks up a new client named Oliver Russell, who is running for governor of Kentucky against the incumbent governor. He does not have much money for a significant campaign and so Leslie donates money to his campaign without informing anyone, while also handling his campaign without cost, though the campaign is rather small-scale. Oliver and Leslie also go out on a series of dates, after one of which Oliver offers to give her a drug known as liquid Ecstasy, saying that it is an aphrodisiac. However, Leslie refuses and Oliver appears to discard it. They plan their wedding, but a few days prior to it, Oliver goes to Paris for a sudden meeting.

When Oliver returns from Paris married to another woman, evoking memories of her own father's elopement with a younger woman, Leslie vows to take revenge against him. However, she keeps her thoughts concealed. The other woman is Jan Davis, daughter of Kentucky Senator Todd Davis, who is revealed to have funded his campaign earlier on the condition that Oliver marries his daughter. Leslie asks Davis to introduce her to one of his friends, a magnate named Henry Chambers, who has recently divorced and lives in Arizona. Oliver soon becomes governor through the help of Senator Davis and his political manager, Peter Tager. A few more deaths occur and are linked to the use of liquid Ecstasy.

A brief introduction followed by marriage sees Leslie manage the Phoenix Star, a newspaper owned by Henry. With his failing health and subsequent death, Leslie becomes the sole owner of his properties. In spite of all the other businesses, Leslie takes an immense liking for the media empire, with which she intends to destroy Oliver. Meanwhile, Dana Evans, who stars in Sheldon's other novel The Sky Is Falling, is introduced, and appears as an inquisitive reporter who adopts a boy from war-torn Sarajevo while reporting from there. Throughout the novel, Oliver appears to have several affairs, and soon Senator Davis announces plans to make him the President of the United States. Leslie soon acquires the Washington Tribune, a large media conglomerate also employing Dana.

Oliver becomes the President, and Leslie uses her media empire to slander his name by pushing several stories critical of him (including one about his affairs) to the front page. However, soon into Oliver's first term, a young woman is found dead in the penthouse suite of a luxury hotel in Washington D.C., and Ecstasy is found in her system during the autopsy. The death is soon linked to him by several pieces of evidence, including a blackmail note from a clerk for the hotel and the lack of an alibi presented by Oliver. A cover-up ensues, and two witnesses and a reporter from the Washington Tribune are killed, causing Dana to take on the story. Leslie forces a story detailing the murders and the fact that a warrant has been taken out against the President to the front page of the paper, but it is then unveiled that Peter Tager is, in fact, behind the liquid Ecstasy deaths, as well as the cover-up of the young woman's murder. Oliver is revealed to have been hiding an affair with the wife of the Italian Ambassador, explaining his lack of an alibi.

Meanwhile, Oliver has to handle the U.S.'s response to Libyan purchases of armaments, as well as a peace deal being offered by the United Arab Emirates regarding the Arab nations and Israel. Senator Davis opposes the deal due to his oil interests, and threatens Oliver to not go through with the peace deal. The book ends with Oliver following through with the peace deal among the Arab Nations and Israel, while Leslie is left shocked and embarrassed by a mistake her media empire will never be able to live down.

== Main characters ==
- Oliver Russell — a handsome, charismatic attorney who goes on to become the governor of Kentucky, then the President of the United States, with the help of the Senator.
- Leslie Chambers (née Stewart) — the jilted fiancée of Oliver, she vows to take revenge on Oliver for leaving her. She goes on to marry a magnate named Henry Chambers, who soon passes away from health issues, and inherits his business. She grows her own media empire, with the aim of magnifying Oliver's faults to destroy his political career and public image.
