= The Stars Shine Down =

1992 novel by Sidney Sheldon

- First edition
- Author: Sidney Sheldon
- Language: English
- Genre: Thriller
- Publisher: William Morrow
- Publication date: Oct 1992
- Publication place: United States
- Media type: Print
- Pages: 400
- ISBN: 0-688-08490-7
- Preceded by: The Doomsday Conspiracy
- Followed by: Nothing Lasts Forever

The Stars Shine Down is a 1992 novel by Sidney Sheldon.

== Plot summary ==
The novel tells the story of Lara Cameron, a successful real estate developer from a broken family in Nova Scotia. Lara's mother and her male twin die during their birth and her Scottish father, who collects rents for boarding houses, doesn't want her. Early in life, she learns to fend for herself and how to get her own way in a male-dominated world. After her father's death due to a sudden heart failure, Lara takes up her father's job along with her own kitchen work in the boarding house. She meets a man called Charles Cohn who is much impressed by her. He hands her a contract for building. To acquire a fine piece of land, she makes a deal with the owner of the boarding house to secure her first building in exchange for her body. Thrilled at her success, she moves to Chicago to start her real estate career. Even though she encounters many problems, she is able to overcome them all and become one of America's most successful businesswomen, and receives the nickname, "Iron Butterfly." She falls in love with a talented pianist, Philip Adler, and marries him. She is on the verge of losing everything she has achieved as well as the one man she loves, but the Iron Butterfly miraculously recovers from all her shattered dreams and gains back all her hopes and the only man she ever truly loved.

== Reception ==
Kirkus Reviews gave the book a positive review, calling it "compulsively readable". A negative review by Publishers Weekly criticized the characterization, and called the book "a barely tepid potboiler".
