= Windmills of the Gods =

1987 novel by Sidney Sheldon

- First edition
- Author: Sidney Sheldon
- Language: English
- Publisher: William Morrow
- Publication date: 1987
- Pages: 384
- ISBN: 0-688-06570-8
- OCLC: 14273555
- Dewey Decimal: 813/.54 19
- LC Class: PS3569.H3927 W5 1987
- Preceded by: If Tomorrow Comes
- Followed by: The Sands of Time

Windmills of the Gods is a 1987 thriller novel by American writer Sidney Sheldon.

== Plot summary ==
Mary Ashley, a professor at Kansas State University, is offered an ambassadorship by Paul Ellison, the US president. She rejects the offer because her husband, Dr. Edward Ashley, does not want to leave his medical practice, and she is not willing to be separated from him. She also feels that it is harder to find a good physician for a small Kansas town than an ambassador to a foreign country. When her husband suddenly dies in a traffic accident, Ashley accepts the President's offer in order to fill the void in her life. She is sent to Romania, behind the Iron Curtain, and adapts to the role of ambassador.

She takes an instant distaste to her second in command, Mike Slade, but is unable to remove him due to his appointment being a presidential order. Her success as an ambassador turns her into a public face for understanding between the United States and Romania. She begins a relationship with Louis Desforges, a widowed French physician that saves her from attempts to kidnap and poison her, until he gets killed by Slade.

Interspersed with that narration, the novel shows gatherings of members of the Patriots for Freedom, a secret society of powerful men that orchestrate political events trying to divide the Eastern and Western Blocs. They hire an Argentinian assassin nicknamed Angel to kill her, but the information is leaked and the attempt foiled.

In the climax of the novel, it is revealed that Mike Slade is an agent who infiltrated the Patriots for Freedom and foiled their plans, while Desforges was an agent of the Patriots who saved her only so she could be publicly killed by Angel. The members of the Patriots are arrested and their chairman (revealed to be the Vice President of the United States) is killed by Angel after refusing to pay for the failed assassination.

Once this threat is neutralized, Mary attempts to resign her post, believing that her success was created to be used as a political tool, but the president convinces her to remain in the position under the protection of Slade. In the final scene, another cell of the Patriots for Freedom composed only of women (presumably led by the dead Veep's widow) is shown deliberating about their next course of action.

== TV version ==
A TV miniseries, starring Jaclyn Smith, was released in 1988.
