= If Tomorrow Comes (miniseries) =

- Also known as: Sidney Sheldon's If Tomorrow Comes
- Genre: Crime; Drama; Mystery
- Based on: If Tomorrow Comes by Sidney Sheldon
- Screenplay by: Carmen Culver
- Story by: Sidney Sheldon
- Directed by: Jerry London
- Starring: Madolyn Smith; Tom Berenger; David Keith
- Theme music composer: Nick Bicât
- Country of origin: United States
- Original language: English
- No. of episodes: 3

Production
- Executive producer: Bob Markell
- Producers: Carmen Culver; Nick Gillott
- Production locations: Fondation Ephrussie de Rothschild, Villa Ile-de-Frances, Cap Ferrat, Alpes-Maritimes, France; Cannes, Alpes-Maritimes, France; Amsterdam, North Holland, Netherlands; Ahmanson Mansion - 401 South Hudson Place, Hancock Park, Los Angeles, California; PTC carousel, Pacific Ocean Park, Santa Monica, California; Spring Street Towers - 650 S. Spring Street, Downtown, Los Angeles, California; Lee International Studios, Shepperton, Surrey, England; London; New Orleans
- Cinematography: Dennis C. Lewiston; Paul Lohmann
- Editors: Dick Darling; Bernard Gribble; George W. Brooks
- Running time: 314 minutes
- Production company: CBS Entertainment Production

Original release
- Network: CBS
- Release: March 16 – March 18, 1986

Sidney Sheldon's If Tomorrow Comes is a 1986 American television miniseries based on the 1985 novel of the same name by Sidney Sheldon, starring Madolyn Smith, Tom Berenger and David Keith. It was directed by Jerry London and the screenplay was written by Carmen Culver.

== Plot summary ==
Trying to get justice for her wronged mother, financial expert Tracy Whitney is instead framed by a gangster for bank fraud and sent to prison for fifteen years by a corrupt judge and a crooked attorney. At first a victim, Tracy makes alliances, learns valuable skills from her fellow inmates, and plots her escape. She abandons her plan in order to save the warden's young daughter from drowning, earning herself a pardon.

After exacting revenge on the men responsible for her sentence, Whitney accepts an offer from the brutal Gunther Hartog to become his apprentice; under his tutelage, she becomes a master con artist and disguise expert. While plotting her biggest score, she crosses paths with another veteran con artist, Jeff Stevens, to whom she is attracted but is not sure she can trust. Trailing behind them is the unstable insurance investigator Daniel Cooper.

== Cast ==
- Madolyn Smith as Tracy Whitney
- Tom Berenger as Jeff Stevens
- David Keith as Daniel Cooper
- Jack Weston as Uncle Willie
- Richard Kiley as Gunther Hartog
- Liam Neeson as Inspector André Trignant
- Barry Jenner as Zeller
- Lane Smith as Warden Brannigan
- CCH Pounder as Ernestine Littlechap
- Maryam d'Abo as Solange

== Production and broadcast ==
To play Tracy Whitney, Smith used sixteen different costumes, including a scene where she dons a latex mask, black hood, and wig to pose as an elderly woman. She called the miniseries "a very classy soap opera" that is "fun and adventuresome". The seven-hour miniseries was broadcast on CBS in three parts on March 16, 17 and 18, 1986. It drew a respectable audience and placed as the top 15th show in the Nielsen ratings.

== Home media ==
If Tomorrow Comes was released on VHS by Starmaker Entertainment in 1995, and in a two-disc DVD set from Image Entertainment on March 1, 2011.
