= Morning, Noon and Night (novel) =

1995 novel by Sidney Sheldon

Morning, Noon And Night
- First edition
- Author: Sidney Sheldon
- Language: English
- Genre: Crime novel
- Publisher: William Morrow
- Publication date: 1995
- Publication place: United States
- Media type: Print (hardback & paperback)
- Pages: 375 pp
- ISBN: 0-446-60221-3
- OCLC: 35267924

Morning, Noon and Night is a 1995 novel by Sidney Sheldon.

== Plot ==
The Stanford family is one of the most respected in America - but behind the facade of fame and glamour lies a hidden web of blackmail, drugs and murder. When Harry Stanford, one of the wealthiest men in the world, mysteriously drowns while cruising on his yacht off the rugged coast of Corsica, it sets off a chain of events that reverberates around the globe. At the family gathering following the funeral in Boston, a strikingly beautiful young woman appears. She claims to be Stanford's daughter and entitled to a share of the tycoon's estate. Is she genuine, or is she an impostor? Sweeping from the splendors of the Italian Riviera, to the fashion salons of Paris and New York, and the opulence of Boston and Florida, Morning, Noon & Night twists and turns its way through intrigue, smoke and mirrors to a surprise ending you'll never forget.
