= Tilly Bagshawe =

British author and journalist

- Born: Matilda Emily Mary Bagshawe; 12 June 1973 (age 53); London, England, United Kingdom
- Occupations: Author, journalist
- Spouse: Robin Nydes
- Children: 4
- Relatives: Louise Mensch (sister)
- Writing career
- Pen name: M. B. Shaw
- Language: English
- Period: 2005–present
- Genres: Romance, chick lit, mystery
- Website: tillybagshawe.com

Matilda Emily Mary Bagshawe (born 12 June 1973), known professionally as Tilly Bagshawe, is a British author and journalist. She is a New York Times bestselling author, best known for her continuation of works in the style of American author Sidney Sheldon, notably Sidney Sheldon's Mistress of the Game and Sidney Sheldon's After the Darkness.

== Life ==
Bagshawe was born on 12 June 1973 at Lambeth Hospital, London. She is one of three daughters of Nicholas Wilfrid Bagshawe and his wife, Daphne Margaret (née Triggs). Her father is from the Bagshawe family of Roman Catholic gentry, who originally came from Wormhill Hall, near Buxton, Derbyshire, and Oakes-in-Norton, near Sheffield. Her great-grandfather was the marine artist Joseph Ridgard Bagshawe, himself a grandson of the 19th-century marine artist Clarkson Stanfield, and a nephew of Edward Gilpin Bagshawe, Catholic Bishop of Nottingham. Her paternal grandmother, Mary Frideswide, was the daughter of Charles Robertson, a stockbroker and benefactor of St Philip's Priory, Begbroke, and one of the co-founders of Westminster Cathedral. Her elder sister is Louise Mensch, a novelist and former Conservative Member of Parliament.

Bagshawe was educated at Woldingham School, Surrey. At the age of seventeen she gave birth to a daughter, Persephone, as a single mother. She subsequently completed her studies and entered St John's College, Cambridge at eighteen, bringing her infant daughter with her.

After graduating, she pursued a career in the City of London as a headhunter, becoming, by the age of 26, the youngest-ever partner at what was then described as the world's leading executive search firm. She subsequently moved into journalism, contributing regularly to The Sunday Times, the Daily Mail, and the Evening Standard before turning to fiction.

She is married to Robin Nydes, an American businessman; the couple have four children and divide their time between London and Los Angeles.

== Writing career ==
Bagshawe's debut novel, Adored (2005), became a bestseller on both sides of the Atlantic. From 2009 onwards she was commissioned to continue the fiction series originated by Sidney Sheldon, producing eight novels in that series to date. She also writes crime fiction under the pen name M. B. Shaw.

== Bibliography ==
=== Novels ===
- Bagshawe, Tilly (July 2005). Adored. New York: Grand Central Publishing. ISBN 978-0-446-57688-8.
- Bagshawe, Tilly (June 2006). Showdown. New York: Grand Central Publishing. ISBN 978-0-446-57689-5.
- Bagshawe, Tilly (January 2008). Do Not Disturb. London: Orion. ISBN 978-0-7528-7419-7.
- Bagshawe, Tilly (2009). Flawless. London: Orion. ISBN 978-1-4091-0099-7.
- Bagshawe, Tilly (2010). Scandalous. London: HarperCollins. ISBN 978-0-00-732651-8.
- Bagshawe, Tilly (2011). Fame. Naperville, Illinois: Sourcebooks Landmark. ISBN 978-1-6121-8463-0.
- Bagshawe, Tilly (2012). Friends and Rivals. London: HarperCollins. ISBN 978-0-00-745777-9.
- Bagshawe, Tilly (April 2014). The Inheritance. Swell Valley, Book 1. London: HarperCollins. ISBN 978-0-00-747251-2.
- Bagshawe, Tilly (2015). The Show. Swell Valley, Book 2. London: HarperCollins. ISBN 978-0-00-752302-3.
- Bagshawe, Tilly (2016). The Bachelor. Swell Valley, Book 3. London: HarperCollins. ISBN 978-0-00-813281-1.
- Bagshawe, Tilly (February 2022). The Secrets of Sainte Madeleine. London: HarperCollins. ISBN 978-0-00-852186-7.
- Bagshawe, Tilly (November 2024). The Secret Keepers. London: HarperCollins. ISBN 978-0-00-852189-8.

=== Sidney Sheldon series ===
- Bagshawe, Tilly (August 2009). Sidney Sheldon's Mistress of the Game. New York: William Morrow. ISBN 978-0-06-172838-1.
- Bagshawe, Tilly (May 2010). Sidney Sheldon's After the Darkness. New York: William Morrow. ISBN 978-0-06-172830-5.
- Bagshawe, Tilly (April 2012). Sidney Sheldon's Angel of the Dark. New York: William Morrow. ISBN 978-0-06-207341-9.
- Bagshawe, Tilly (April 2013). Sidney Sheldon's The Tides of Memory. New York: William Morrow. ISBN 978-0-06-207342-6.
- Bagshawe, Tilly (October 2014). Sidney Sheldon's Chasing Tomorrow. New York: HarperCollins. ISBN 978-0-06-234407-6.
- Bagshawe, Tilly (November 2015). Sidney Sheldon's Reckless. New York: William Morrow. ISBN 978-0-06-230405-6.
- Bagshawe, Tilly (June 2018). Sidney Sheldon's The Silent Widow. London: HarperCollins. ISBN 978-0-00-822963-4.
- Bagshawe, Tilly (2019). Sidney Sheldon's The Phoenix. London: HarperCollins. ISBN 978-0-00-829008-5.

=== M. B. Shaw – Iris Grey Mysteries ===
- —— (2017). Murder at the Mill. London: Trapeze. ISBN 9781409166190.
