= Memories of Midnight =

1990 novel by Sidney Sheldon

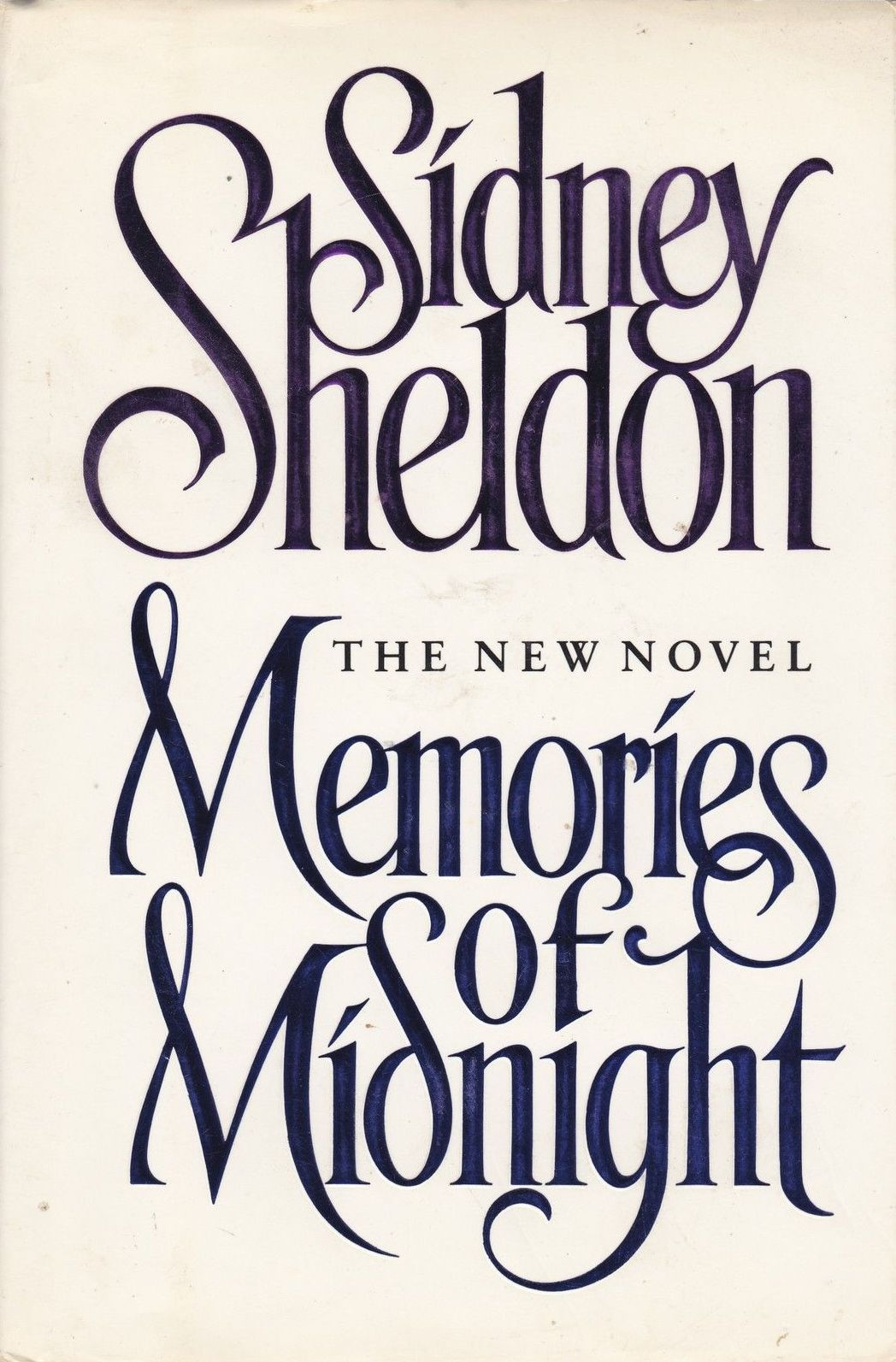
- First edition cover
- Author: Sidney Sheldon
- Language: English
- Publisher: William Morrow
- Publication date: 1990
- Publication place: United States
- Media type: Print (hardback & paperback)
- Preceded by: The Other Side of Midnight

Memories of Midnight, sometimes known as The Other Side of Midnight (Book 2), is a 1990 novel by Sidney Sheldon. It is a sequel to Sheldon's 1973 bestseller The Other Side of Midnight.

== Plot summary ==
The novel begins at the end of The Other Side of Midnight, with Catherine Douglas recovering in a convent, knowing only her name. Everyone except Constantin Demiris, known as Costa, thinks she was killed by her husband, Larry Douglas, and his mistress, Noelle Page. Catherine requests to leave the convent to uncover her past, which Costa permits.

In Greece Catherine remembers Larry and Noelle trying to drown her, and tells Costa, her apparent benefactor. Worried that she will realise they were wrongfully convicted, he sends her to London to work in one of his offices.

Frederick Stavros begins to feel guilty for sending Larry and Noelle to their death, as he was their lawyer and they were all tricked into pleading guilty by Napoleon Chotas. He dies shortly after confiding in a priest, who then tells an employee of Spyros Lambrou, the brother of Costa's wife Melina. Spyros Lambrou uses this news to destroy Costa, who has been mistreating his sister.

Fearing for his life, Chotas leaves a package with attorney Peter Demonides, and sends a tape to tell Costa this. When Chotas apparently dies in a house-fire the next day, Peter delivers the package to Costa, rather than the authorities, and starts working for him. Meanwhile, Catherine befriends Kirk Reynolds, who falls in love with her. She tells him that her husband and his mistress were executed for her attempted murder. Kirk is doubtful that Greek law would sentence anyone to death for attempted murder, but checks with his acquaintance, Peter Demonides, and dies the next day.

Spyros tries to destroy Costa by convincing drug dealer Tony Rizzoli to trick Costa into taking a drug shipment into the USA. Costa kills Tony, destroys his shipment, and threatens to kill Melina. Melina assures Spyros that she can take care of herself. Spyros's house is attacked but he and his wife survive. Melina finally believes that Costa wants to kill them, so kills herself and frames Costa for the murder. Meanwhile, Costa has ordered the killing of Catherine.

Costa is arrested for Melina’s murder. Only Sypros can give him an alibi for the murder, but he refuses. Chotas reappears, in a wheelchair, having survived the house fire. He defends Costa in court, convincing Spyros into testifying in return for all of Costa’s assets, arguing that forcing him into poverty would be worse than death. Meanwhile, Costa and Chotas arrange for Costa’s assets to be transferred to a firm owned by Chotas, so Spyros will get nothing.

Catherine falls in love with her psychoanalyst, Alan Hamilton. Three strange men arrive in London, and Catherine suspects them, but only at the last minute realizes that in fact it is their office boy who intends to kill her. He locks her in the basement and turns up the thermostat of the boiler, which will explode when it reaches 400 °C (752 °F). She survives by hiding in a nearby bomb shelter, learns the truth about Costa and his conviction, and eventually marries Alan.

In the meantime, Costa is being tried for a murder he didn't commit, but Spyros testifies on the last day of the trial, freeing him. On the drive home, Chotas tells Costa that even though he liked Noelle Page, he still helped kill her. He also says he has donated all Costa’s assets to the convent, since he does not wish to continue living after what Costa did to him. Finally, he drives the car off a cliff, killing Costa and himself.

== Adaptation ==
In 1991, the book was adapted for television as a two-part miniseries directed by Gary Nelson starring Omar Sharif as Constantin Demiris and Jane Seymour as Catherine Alexander. The miniseries follows the events of the book very closely. However, the connection with the preceding book (The Other Side of Midnight), which had been turned into a 1977 motion picture, was lost as the story was set in the contemporary world, rather than immediately post-WWII.
