= Sidney Sheldon =

American writer (1917–2007)

- Born: Sidney Schechtel; February 11, 1917; Chicago, Illinois, U.S.
- Died: January 30, 2007 (aged 89); Rancho Mirage, California, U.S.
- Education: Northwestern University
- Occupations: Novelist; screenwriter; television producer; playwright
- Spouses: Jane Kaufman Harding (m. 1945; div. 1946) Jorja Curtright (m. 1951; died 1985) Alexandra Joyce Kostoff (m. 1989)
- Writing career
- Period: 1941–2007
- Genres: Crime fiction, thriller, comedy

Sidney Sheldon (February 11, 1917 – January 30, 2007) was an American writer. He was prominent in the 1940s and 50s, first working on Broadway plays, and then in motion pictures, notably writing the successful comedy The Bachelor and the Bobby-Soxer (1947), which earned him an Oscar in 1948. He went on to work in television. Over the course of 20 years, he created The Patty Duke Show (1963–66), I Dream of Jeannie (1965–70), and Hart to Hart (1979–84). After turning 50, he began writing best-selling romantic suspense novels, such as The Other Side of Midnight (1973), Master of the Game (1982), and Rage of Angels (1980).

Sheldon's novels have sold over 300 million copies in 51 languages. He is consistently cited as one of the top 10 best-selling fiction writers of all time.

== Early life ==
Sheldon was born Sidney Schechtel in Chicago, Illinois. His parents, of Ukrainian Jewish ancestry, were Ascher "Otto" Schechtel (1894–1967), manager of a jewelry store, and Natalie Marcus. At age 10, Sidney made his first sale, $5 for a poem. During the Great Depression, he worked at a variety of jobs, and after graduating from East High School in Denver, Colorado, he attended Northwestern University on a scholarship, and contributed short plays to drama groups. He had to drop out after six months to help support his family. Sheldon enlisted in the military during World War II as a pilot in the War Training Service, a branch of the Army Air Corps. His unit was disbanded, but he was discharged because of a recurring slipped disc before he was deployed.

== Career ==
In 1937, Sheldon moved to Hollywood, where he reviewed scripts and collaborated on a number of B movies.

=== Broadway ===
Sheldon began writing musicals for the Broadway stage while continuing to write screenplays for both MGM Studios and Paramount Pictures. He earned a reputation as a prolific writer; for example, at one time, Ben Roberts and he had three musicals on Broadway - a rewritten The Merry Widow, Jackpot, and Dream with Music. Sheldon received a Tony Award in 1959 for his musical Redhead, starring Gwen Verdon. His other stage plays include Alice in Arms, The King of New York, The Judge, and Roman Candle. Only Roman Candle has been published as a book. The play Gomes was performed only in London and not on Broadway.

=== Film ===
Sheldon's success on Broadway brought him back to Hollywood, where his first assignment was The Bachelor and the Bobby-Soxer, which earned him the Academy Award for Best Original Screenplay in 1947. He was one of the writers on the screenplay for the 1948 musical film Easter Parade and sole writer for the 1950 musical film Annie Get Your Gun, both of which featured the songs of Irving Berlin. Some of his other writing credits include South of Panama; Gambling Daughters; Dangerous Lady; Borrowed Hero; Mr. District Attorney in the Carter Case; Fly-by-Night; She's in the Army; Nancy Goes to Rio; Three Guys Named Mike; No questions asked; Rich, Young and Pretty; Just This Once; Remains to be Seen; Dream Wife (directed as well); You're Never Too Young; The Birds and the Bees; Anything Goes; Pardners; The Buster Keaton Story (directed as well); All in a Night's Work; and Billy Rose's Jumbo.

=== Television ===
When television became the new popular medium, Sheldon decided to try his hand at it. "I suppose I needed money," he remembered. "I met Patty Duke one day at lunch. So I produced The Patty Duke Show, and I did something nobody else in TV ever did. For seven years, I wrote almost every single episode of the series."

After seeing Duke's performance as Helen Keller in The Miracle Worker (1962), Sheldon cast the actress as the two sitcom leads, identical cousins, Patty and Cathy Lane. Following the show's success, Sheldon had signed an agreement with Screen Gems to handle the development of various television series.

In 1965, Sheldon created, produced, and wrote I Dream of Jeannie starring Barbara Eden and Larry Hagman. He wrote all but two dozen scripts in five years, sometimes using three pseudonyms (Mark Rowane, Allan Devon, and Christopher Golato), while simultaneously writing scripts for The Patty Duke Show. He later said that he did this because he felt his name was appearing too often in the credits as creator, producer, copyright owner, and writer of these series.

Production for I Dream of Jeannie ended in 1970 after five seasons. "During the last year of I Dream of Jeannie, I decided to try a novel," he said in 1982. "Each morning from 9 until noon, I had a secretary at the studio take all calls. I mean every single call. I wrote each morning — or rather, dictated — and then I faced the TV business."

In 1970, Sheldon wrote all 17 episodes of the short-lived series Nancy.

In 1979, Sheldon created and wrote for the series Hart to Hart starring Robert Wagner and Stefanie Powers. The show aired on ABC and ran for five seasons.

=== Novels ===
In 1969, Sheldon wrote his first novel, The Naked Face, which earned him a nomination for the Edgar Allan Poe Award from the Mystery Writers of America in the category of Best First Novel. His next novel, The Other Side of Midnight, climbed to number one on The New York Times Best Seller list, as did several ensuing novels, a number of which were also made into motion pictures or TV miniseries. His novels often featured determined women who persevere in a tough world run by hostile men. The novels contained suspense and devices to keep the reader turning the page:

"I try to write my books so the reader can't put them down," he explained in a 1982 interview. "I try to construct them so when the reader gets to the end of it, he or she has to read just one more chapter. It's the technique of the old Saturday afternoon serial - leave the guy hanging on the edge of the cliff at the end of the chapter."

Most of his readers were women. Asked why this was the case, he said: "I like to write about women who are talented and capable, but most important, retain their femininity. Women have tremendous power — their femininity, because men can't do without it." Books were Sheldon's favorite medium. "I love writing books," he commented. "Movies are a collaborative medium, and everyone is second-guessing you. When you do a novel, you're on your own. It's a freedom that doesn't exist in any other medium." He was the author of 18 novels, which have sold over 300 million copies.

Three years before his death, the Los Angeles Times called Sheldon "Mr. Blockbuster" and "prince of potboilers".

== Personal life ==
Sheldon was first married to Jane Kaufman Harding (1945–1946). Later, he wrote, "Regretfully, in less than a month, Jane and I realized we had made a mistake. We spent the next nine months trying in vain to make the marriage work."

He was married for 30 years to Jorja Curtright, a stage and film actress, who later became an interior designer. She played Suzanne in the 1955 film, Love Is a Many-Splendored Thing, and appeared as Madame Zolta in season one of I Dream of Jeannie in episode 25, "Bigger Than a Bread Box". Curtright died of a heart attack in 1985. Their daughter, Mary Sheldon, became a novelist, as well.

Sheldon married Alexandra Joyce Kostoff, a former child actress, in Las Vegas in 1989.

Sheldon struggled with bipolar disorder for years; he contemplated suicide at 17 (talked out of it by his father, who found him with a bottle of whiskey and several bottles of sleeping pills), as detailed in his autobiography published in 2005, The Other Side of Me.

== Death ==
A resident of Palm Springs, California, Sheldon died on January 30, 2007, of pneumonia at Eisenhower Medical Center in Rancho Mirage, California, 12 days before his 90th birthday. His remains were cremated; the ashes were interred in Westwood Village Memorial Park Cemetery.

== Awards ==
Sheldon won an Academy Award for Writing Original Screenplay (1947) for The Bachelor and the Bobby-Soxer and a Tony Award (1959) for his musical Redhead, and was nominated for an Emmy Award for his work on I Dream of Jeannie, an NBC sitcom. Sheldon was inducted into the Hollywood Walk of Fame in 1988 had a Golden Palm Star on the Palm Springs Walk of Stars dedicated to him in 1994. In 1990, Sheldon received the Golden Plate Award of the American Academy of Achievement.

== Works ==
=== Novel series ===
==== Midnight ====
1. The Other Side of Midnight (1973)
2. Memories of Midnight (1990)

==== Ambitious Women ====
1. The Stars Shine Down (1992)
2. The Best Laid Plans (1997)
3. The Sky Is Falling (2001)

=== Novels not in series ===
- The Naked Face (1970)
- A Stranger in the Mirror (1976)
- Bloodline (1977)
- Rage of Angels (1980)
- Master of the Game (1982)
- If Tomorrow Comes (1985)
- Windmills of the Gods (1987)
- The Sands of Time (1988)
- The Doomsday Conspiracy (1991)
- Nothing Lasts Forever (1994)
- Morning, Noon, and Night (1995)
- Tell Me Your Dreams (1998)
- Are You Afraid of the Dark? (2004)

=== Autobiography ===
- The Other Side of Me (2005)

=== Broadway plays ===
- The Merry Widow (1943)
- Jackpot (1944)
- Dream with Music (1944)
- Alice in Arms (1945)
- Redhead (1959)
- Roman Candle (1960)
- The King of New York (1961)
- The Judge (1962)

=== London plays ===
- Gomes

=== Children's books and young-adult works ===
- The Adventures of Drippy the Runaway Raindrop

These books were published to introduce English-language novels in Japan. Some of the books have also been translated to Spanish, German, and Portuguese. The English versions of these books are not available outside of Japan.

- Man on the Run
- The Dictator
- The Revenge!
- The Twelve Commandments
- We Are Not Married
- The Money Tree
- The Adventure of a Quarter
- The Chase
- Ghost Story
- The Strangler
- The Million Dollar Lottery

=== Short story and poetry ===
- "Need to Know" (1986) is an unpublished short story that was adapted by Mary Sheldon as a teleplay for The Twilight Zone by the same name.
- "The Eagle" (2001) is a poem written in the aftermath of the 9/11 attacks.

=== Sidney Sheldon books by Tilly Bagshawe ===
After his death in 2007 an authorized british author namely Tilly Bagshawe wrote thriller novels using his names and characters

- Mistress of the Game (2009), a sequel to Master of the Game
- After the Darkness (2010)
- Angel of the Dark (2012)
- The Tides of Memory (2013)
- Chasing Tomorrow (2014), sequel to If Tomorrow Comes
- Reckless (2015), second sequel to If Tomorrow Comes
- The Silent Widow (2018)
- The Phoenix (2019)

=== Films as writer ===
- Mr. District Attorney in the Carter Case (1941)
- She's in the Army (1942)
- The Bachelor and the Bobby-Soxer (1947)
- Easter Parade (1948)
- The Barkleys of Broadway (1949)
- Annie Get Your Gun (1950)
- Nancy Goes to Rio (1950)
- Three Guys Named Mike (1951)
- Rich, Young and Pretty (1951)
- No Questions Asked (1952)
- Just This Once (1952)
- Dream Wife (1953) (also director)
- Remains to be Seen (1953)
- You're Never Too Young (1955)
- Pardners (1956)
- Anything Goes (1956)
- The Birds and the Bees (1956)
- The Buster Keaton Story (1957)
- All in a Night's Work (1961)
- Billy Rose's Jumbo (1962)
- The Other Side of Midnight (1977)
- Bloodline (1979)

=== Television ===
- Colgate Theatre (episode "Adventures of a Model," 1958)
- The Patty Duke Show
- I Dream of Jeannie
- Nancy
- Hart to Hart (co-wrote pilot, 1979)
- Rage of Angels (1983 miniseries, based on his book)
- Rage of Angels: The Story Continues (1986 miniseries, based on his book, a sequel to Rage of Angels)
- Master of the Game (1984 miniseries, based on his book)
- If Tomorrow Comes (1986 miniseries, based on his book)
- Windmills of the Gods (1988 miniseries, based on his book)
- Memories of Midnight (1991 miniseries, based on his book)
- A Stranger in the Mirror (1993 made-for-TV movie)
