= List of The New York Times number-one books of 1989 =

The American daily newspaper The New York Times publishes multiple weekly lists ranking the best-selling books in the United States.

== Fiction ==
The following list ranks the number-one best-selling fiction books, in the hardcover fiction category.

Date	Book	Author
January 1	The Sands of Time	Sidney Sheldon
January 8	The Sands of Time	Sidney Sheldon
January 15	The Sands of Time	Sidney Sheldon
January 22	The Sands of Time	Sidney Sheldon
January 29	The Sands of Time	Sidney Sheldon
February 5	Midnight	Dean Koontz
February 12	Midnight	Dean Koontz
February 19	Midnight	Dean Koontz
February 26	Star	Danielle Steel
March 5	Star	Danielle Steel
March 12	Star	Danielle Steel
March 19	Star	Danielle Steel
March 26	The Satanic Verses	Salman Rushdie
April 2	The Satanic Verses	Salman Rushdie
April 9	The Satanic Verses	Salman Rushdie
April 16	The Satanic Verses	Salman Rushdie
April 23	The Satanic Verses	Salman Rushdie
April 30	The Satanic Verses	Salman Rushdie
May 7	The Satanic Verses	Salman Rushdie
May 14	The Satanic Verses	Salman Rushdie
May 21	The Satanic Verses	Salman Rushdie
May 28	While My Pretty One Sleeps	Mary Higgins Clark
June 4	While My Pretty One Sleeps	Mary Higgins Clark
June 11	The Russia House	John le Carré
June 18	The Russia House	John le Carré
June 25	The Russia House	John le Carré
July 2	The Russia House	John le Carré
July 9	The Russia House	John le Carré
July 16	The Russia House	John le Carré
July 23	The Russia House	John le Carré
July 30	The Russia House	John le Carré
August 6	Polar Star	Martin Cruz Smith
August 13	Polar Star	Martin Cruz Smith
August 20	The Russia House	John le Carré
August 27	The Russia House	John le Carré
September 3	Clear and Present Danger	Tom Clancy
September 10	Clear and Present Danger	Tom Clancy
September 17	Clear and Present Danger	Tom Clancy
September 24	Clear and Present Danger	Tom Clancy
October 1	Clear and Present Danger	Tom Clancy
October 8	Clear and Present Danger	Tom Clancy
October 15	Clear and Present Danger	Tom Clancy
October 22	Clear and Present Danger	Tom Clancy
October 29	Clear and Present Danger	Tom Clancy
November 5	The Dark Half	Stephen King
November 12	The Dark Half	Stephen King
November 19	The Dark Half	Stephen King
November 26	Daddy	Danielle Steel
December 3	Daddy	Danielle Steel
December 10	Daddy	Danielle Steel
December 17	Daddy	Danielle Steel
December 24	The Dark Half	Stephen King
December 31	Daddy	Danielle Steel

== Nonfiction ==
The following list ranks the number-one best-selling nonfiction books, in the hardcover nonfiction category.

Date	Book	Author
January 1	All I Really Need to Know I Learned in Kindergarten	Robert Fulghum
January 8	All I Really Need to Know I Learned in Kindergarten	Robert Fulghum
January 15	All I Really Need to Know I Learned in Kindergarten	Robert Fulghum
January 22	All I Really Need to Know I Learned in Kindergarten	Robert Fulghum
January 29	All I Really Need to Know I Learned in Kindergarten	Robert Fulghum
February 5	All I Really Need to Know I Learned in Kindergarten	Robert Fulghum
February 12	Blind Faith	Joe McGinniss
February 19	Blind Faith	Joe McGinniss
February 26	All I Really Need to Know I Learned in Kindergarten	Robert Fulghum
March 5	All I Really Need to Know I Learned in Kindergarten	Robert Fulghum
March 12	All I Really Need to Know I Learned in Kindergarten	Robert Fulghum
March 19	All I Really Need to Know I Learned in Kindergarten	Robert Fulghum
March 26	All I Really Need to Know I Learned in Kindergarten	Robert Fulghum
April 2	All I Really Need to Know I Learned in Kindergarten	Robert Fulghum
April 9	All I Really Need to Know I Learned in Kindergarten	Robert Fulghum
April 16	All I Really Need to Know I Learned in Kindergarten	Robert Fulghum
April 23	All I Really Need to Know I Learned in Kindergarten	Robert Fulghum
April 30	All I Really Need to Know I Learned in Kindergarten	Robert Fulghum
May 7	All I Really Need to Know I Learned in Kindergarten	Robert Fulghum
May 14	All I Really Need to Know I Learned in Kindergarten	Robert Fulghum
May 21	A Woman Named Jackie	C. David Heymann
May 28	A Woman Named Jackie	C. David Heymann
June 4	A Woman Named Jackie	C. David Heymann
June 11	A Woman Named Jackie	C. David Heymann
June 18	A Woman Named Jackie	C. David Heymann
June 25	A Woman Named Jackie	C. David Heymann
July 2	Summer of '49	David Halberstam
July 9	A Woman Named Jackie	C. David Heymann
July 16	It's Always Something	Gilda Radner
July 23	It's Always Something	Gilda Radner
July 30	It's Always Something	Gilda Radner
August 6	It's Always Something	Gilda Radner
August 13	All I Really Need to Know I Learned in Kindergarten	Robert Fulghum
August 20	All I Really Need to Know I Learned in Kindergarten	Robert Fulghum
August 27	It's Always Something	Gilda Radner
September 3	All I Really Need to Know I Learned in Kindergarten	Robert Fulghum
September 10	All I Really Need to Know I Learned in Kindergarten	Robert Fulghum
September 17	All I Really Need to Know I Learned in Kindergarten	Robert Fulghum
September 24	All I Really Need to Know I Learned in Kindergarten	Robert Fulghum
October 1	All I Really Need to Know I Learned in Kindergarten	Robert Fulghum
October 8	All I Really Need to Know I Learned in Kindergarten	Robert Fulghum
October 15	All I Really Need to Know I Learned in Kindergarten	Robert Fulghum
October 22	All I Really Need to Know I Learned in Kindergarten	Robert Fulghum
October 29	All I Really Need to Know I Learned in Kindergarten	Robert Fulghum
November 5	All I Really Need to Know I Learned in Kindergarten	Robert Fulghum
November 12	All I Really Need to Know I Learned in Kindergarten	Robert Fulghum
November 19	All I Really Need to Know I Learned in Kindergarten	Robert Fulghum
November 26	My Turn	Nancy Reagan with William Novak
December 3	My Turn	Nancy Reagan with William Novak
December 10	My Turn	Nancy Reagan with William Novak
December 17	My Turn	Nancy Reagan with William Novak
December 24	All I Really Need to Know I Learned in Kindergarten	Robert Fulghum
December 31	All I Really Need to Know I Learned in Kindergarten	Robert Fulghum

== See also ==
- Publishers Weekly list of bestselling novels in the United States in the 1980s
