= Poor Little Rich Girl: The Barbara Hutton Story =

1987 film by Charles Jarrott

- Part 1 print advertisement
- Based on: Poor Little Rich Girl: The Life and Legend of Barbara Hutton by C. David Heymann
- Teleplay by: Dennis Turner
- Directed by: Charles Jarrott
- Starring: Farrah Fawcett; David Ackroyd; Stéphane Audran; Amadeus August; Nicholas Clay; Bruce Davison; Carmen Du Sautoy; Anne Francis; Sascha Hehn; Kevin McCarthy; Tony Peck; Zoë Wanamaker; Clive Arrindell; Linden Ashby
- Theme music composer: Richard Rodney Bennett
- Country of origin: United States
- Original language: English

Production
- Executive producer: Lester Persky
- Producers: Nick Gillott; Tomlinson Dean
- Cinematography: Alan Hume; John Lindley
- Editor: Bill Blunden
- Running time: 240 minutes
- Production companies: Lester Persky Productions; ITC Entertainment

Original release
- Network: NBC
- Release: November 16, 1987

Poor Little Rich Girl: The Barbara Hutton Story is a 1987 television biographical drama starring Farrah Fawcett. The film chronicles the life of Barbara Hutton, a wealthy but troubled American socialite. Released as both a television film and a miniseries, the film won a Golden Globe Award for Best Miniseries or Television Film. Fawcett earned her fifth Golden Globe Award nomination, for Best Actress in a Miniseries of Television Film. Poor Little Rich Girl: The Barbara Hutton Story was based on C. David Heymann's Poor Little Rich Girl: The Life and Legend of Barbara Hutton.

== Plot ==
The true story of one of the richest women in America, heiress to the Woolworth fortune, who had vast wealth and seven husbands.

== Cast ==
Starring

- Farrah Fawcett as Barbara Hutton
  - Matilda Johansson as Barbara at age 5
  - Fairuza Balk as Barbara at age 12
- David Ackroyd as Graham Mattison
- Stéphane Audran as Pauline de la Rochelle
- Amadeus August as Court Haugwitz-Hardenberg Reventlow
- Nicholas Clay as Prince Alexis Mdivani
- Bruce Davison as Jimmy Donahue
  - John Lindros as Jimmy at age 11
- Carmen Du Sautoy as Roussie Mdivani
- Anne Francis as Marjorie Merriweather Post
- Sascha Hehn as Baron Gottfried von Cramm
- Kevin McCarthy as Franklyn Laws Hutton
- Tony Peck as James Douglas III
- Zoë Wanamaker as Jean Kennerly

Also starring

- Clive Arrindell as Prince Igor Troubetzkoy
- Linden Ashby as Lance Reventlow
  - Robert Holman as Lance at ages 5–7
  - Jonathan Brandis as Lance at age 11
- Debbie Barker as Jill St. John
- Brenda Blethyn as Tiki Tocquet
- Nigel Le Vaillant as David Herbert
- Miriam Margolyes as Elsa Maxwell
- Carolyn Seymour as Dorothy Cadwell Taylor Dentice di Frasso
- Tracy Brooks Swope as Peggy

Special appearance by

- Burl Ives as F.W. Woolworth
- James Read as Cary Grant

Co-starring

- Michael Shannon as Morley Kennerly
- Jana Shelden as Irene Olive Curley Bodde Hutton Moffett
- Toria Fuller as Edna Woolworth Hutton
- Blain Fairman as James P. Donahue
- Susan McDonald as Nurse
- Patricia Northcott as Jessie May Woolworth Donahue
- Liza Ross as Aunt Grace
- Nancy Gair as Louise Astor Van Alen
- Julie Eccles as Doris Duke
- David Gilliam as Phil Plant
- Peter Scranton as Jack Pauling
- John Golightly as Inspector Clair
- Julie Ronnie as Sally
- Ronald Leigh-Hunt as Raymond Needham
- James Woolley as Clifford Turner
- Vernon Dobtcheff as Jules Glaenzer
- Nicholas Le Prevost as Sir Patrick Hastings
- Tim Bannerman as Norman Birkett
- Sneh Gupta as Moharoni
- Ellen Garber as Woman friend
- Jeremy Anthony as Maurice Doan
- Neville Jason as Raymond Doan
- Kenny Baker as Burlesque artist (uncredited)

Winston Churchill, Adolf Hitler, Queen Elizabeth II and Queen Elizabeth The Queen Mother also appear in archival footage.

== Crew ==
- Written by: Dennis Turner
- Directed by: Charles Jarrott
- Producer: Nick Gillott
- Music: Richard Rodney Bennett

== Reception ==
=== Critical response ===
Film critic and journalist John J. O'Connor of The New York Times wrote in his review: "This television portrait gives us a Barbara Hutton who is shy and decidedly uncertain of herself. For the most part, she is the victim of scavengers. [...] Actually, according to Mr. Heymann's book, Miss Hutton was more forward and adventurous than is indicated here by the script constraints put on Ms. Fawcett. She may have been shy but she wasted no time in pouncing on any object or person that caught her fancy." Television critic and journalist Jeff Jarvis wrote in his review: "What the stock market did to itself on Bloody Monday, Farrah Fawcett does to herself here. Her value as an actress soared after The Burning Bed and Extremities. Now comes the crash in Poor Little Rich Girl, a two-night miniseries of miseries about Woolworth heiress Barbara Hutton.... Fawcett should have more faith in her talent. If she keeps making herself look awful when she acts, she’s going to be left with only one part to play: Godzilla."

=== Awards ===
- 45th Golden Globe Awards
  - Best Miniseries or Television Film (won)
  - Best Actress in a Miniseries or Television Film (Farrah Fawcett) (nominated)
- 40th Primetime Emmy Awards
  - Outstanding Costume Design for a Miniseries or a Special (won)
  - Outstanding Hairstyling for a Miniseries or Special (won)
  - Outstanding Makeup for a Miniseries or Special (won)

=== Release ===
Poor Little Rich Girl: The Barbara Hutton Story aired on NBC on November 16, 1987. The film was released on DVD on December 16, 2008, by A+E Networks Home Entertainment.
