= Liz: The Elizabeth Taylor Story =

- Genre: Biography; Drama
- Written by: Burr Douglas
- Directed by: Kevin Connor
- Starring: Sherilyn Fenn; Nigel Havers; Katherine Helmond; Kevin McCarthy; Angus Macfadyen; William McNamara; Corey Parker; Ray Wise; Casey Ahern
- Music by: Ken Thorne
- Country of origin: United States
- Original language: English

Production
- Executive producer: Lester Persky
- Producer: Hugh Benson
- Production locations: RMS Queen Mary - 1126 Queens Highway, Long Beach, California
- Cinematography: Douglas Milsome
- Editors: Barry Peters; Corky Ehlers
- Running time: 210 minutes
- Production company: Lester Persky Productions
- Budget: $14 million

Original release
- Network: NBC
- Release: May 21 – May 22, 1995

Liz: The Elizabeth Taylor Story is a 1995 American made-for-television biographical film chronicling the life of British-American actress Elizabeth Taylor, directed by Kevin Connor and based on the book, 'Liz: An Intimate Biography of Elizabeth Taylor' by C. David Heymann.

The film stars Sherilyn Fenn (as Elizabeth Taylor), Katherine Helmond, Nigel Havers, Angus Macfadyen, William McNamara and Ray Wise. It originally aired in two parts on NBC on May 21 and 22, 1995.

== Cast ==
- Sherilyn Fenn as Elizabeth Taylor
- Nigel Havers as Michael Wilding
- Katherine Helmond as Hedda Hopper
- Angus Macfadyen as Richard Burton
- William McNamara as Montgomery Clift
- Kevin McCarthy as Sol Siegel
- Christine Healy as Sara Taylor
- Corey Parker as Eddie Fisher
- Ray Wise as Mike Todd
- Eric Gustavson as Nicky Hilton
- Daniel McVicar as Rock Hudson
- Judith Jones as Debbie Reynolds
- Charles Frank as John Warner
- Michael McGrady as Larry Fortensky
- John Saxon as Richard Brooks

== See also ==
- Liz & Dick — a 2012 Lifetime biopic.
- Burton & Taylor — a 2013 BBC Four bio pic.
