= Marinaccio =

Marinaccio is an Italian surname. Notable people with the surname include:

- Dave Marinaccio (born 1952), American advertising executive and author
- Ron Marinaccio (born 1995), American baseball player
