= Charles Sumner Woolworth =

American businessman (1856–1947)

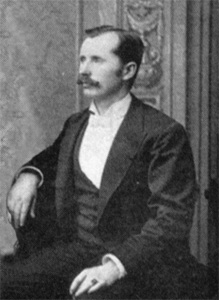
- Born: August 1, 1856; Rodman, New York, U.S.
- Died: January 7, 1947 (aged 90); Scranton, Pennsylvania, U.S.
- Resting place: Dunmore, Pennsylvania, U.S.
- Known for: Founding C. S. Woolworth Company and Chairman of F. W. Woolworth Company
- Title: Chairman
- Term: 1919–1944
- Predecessor: Frank Winfield Woolworth
- Successor: Foot Locker (2001–)
- Political party: Republican
- Spouse: Anna Elizabeth Ryals (m. 1886; died 1913)
- Children: 3
- Relatives: Frank Winfield Woolworth (brother); Seymour H. Knox I (cousin); Barbara Hutton (grandniece)

Charles Sumner Woolworth (August 1, 1856 – January 7, 1947), was an American entrepreneur who went by the nickname of "Sum", opened and managed the world's first five-and-dime store in Utica, New York, and was founder of the "C. S. Woolworth & Co" chain of 5¢ & 10¢ stores. Sum's brother, Frank Winfield Woolworth, was first to venture into the retail business with his own store, and soon after, he asked Sum to join him. Frank founded "F. W. Woolworth & Co", which later merged with other Woolworth affiliate stores to be the F. W. Woolworth Company. After the death of his brother, Sum became the longest serving Chairman of the F. W. Woolworth Company. During the early years, Sum also partnered with a long-time friend, Fred Kirby, to open a "Woolworth and Kirby" store in Wilkes-Barre, Pennsylvania. When Fred bought out Sum's share, that store grew to become a "friendly rival" affiliate store, in close alliance with the two Woolworth brothers.

In 1904, Sum and Frank Woolworth were affiliated with six (6) chains. Frank developed the back office side of the business. Sum developed the front of the business, pioneering self-service methods, customer service, training new managers, brightly lit stores, and frequently-changed window displays to lure customers inside. In 1912 C. S. Woolworth & Co, with the other affiliated chains, merged 596 stores under the corporate name "F. W. Woolworth Company". After the death of his brother, Frank Winfield Woolworth, Charles Sumner Woolworth became the reluctant Chairman of the Board of F. W. Woolworth Company (now Foot Locker), for 25 years. As a philanthropist and business man, he was involved with several institutions and businesses in Scranton, Pennsylvania, and other areas.

== Biography ==
Charles Sumner Woolworth, known by everyone as Sum, was born on August 1, 1856, in Rodman, New York, to John Hubbell Woolworth and Fanny McBrier. Growing up, he worked on his family's farm. His paternal ancestors were English farmers who left England around 1665 settling in the Massachusetts Bay Colony area. Meanwhile, his mother's parents, the McBriers, were Scots-Irish from County Down, Ulster, who had come to the United States in 1827. When his brother Frank sought work and fortune as an apprentice in Augsbury and Moore dry goods store, in Watertown, New York, Sum became eager to follow. At 21, Sum joined Frank as an apprentice salesman in the same store, which had since become Moore and Smith. While Frank liked the back end of the business in accounting and purchasing, Sum liked the front end of the business, meeting customers and working on innovative ways to display merchandise.

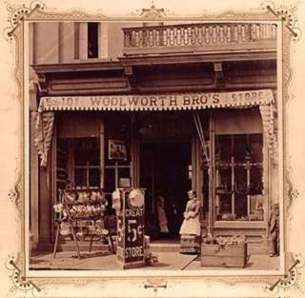
Second successful "Woolworth Bros" store, opened on November 6, 1880, in at 125 Penn Ave., Scranton, Pennsylvania. Later bought by brother Charles "Sum", becoming the first "C. S. Woolworth" store. C. 1881

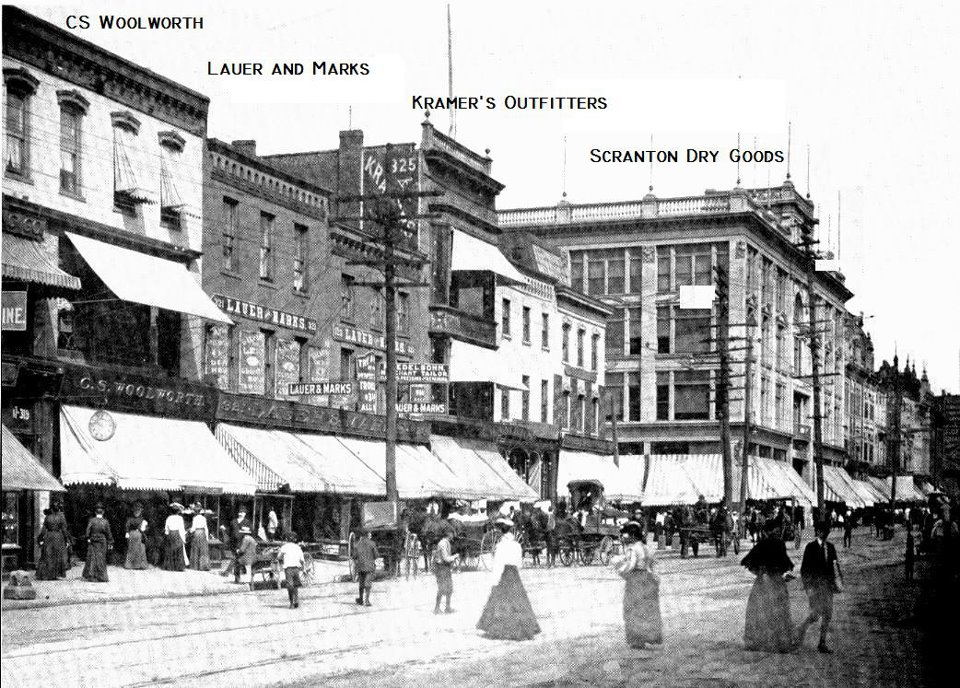
C. S. Woolworth store at 319 Lackawanna Avenue, Scranton, Pennsylvania. Other buildings along the avenue are identified. C. 1885–1900.

With a loan from his former boss, William Moore, Frank opened a five-cent store in Utica, New York, on February 22, 1878. Though it initially appeared to be successful, business soon dropped off and the store failed in early May 1878, after Frank earned enough to pay back his debt to William Moore. Within days, Frank acted on a tip from a close friend and visited Lancaster, Pennsylvania, and quickly decided to re-locate there. He opened his first successful "Woolworth's Great Five Cent Store" on June 21, 1879, on North Queen Street, using the same sign from Utica. The idea of an entire store devoted to such low-priced items was unprecedented, anywhere. The Lancaster store was the first successful store of this type. At the end of the first day in Lancaster, Frank counted his profit, and with renewed enthusiasm, he invited his brother, Sum, to join him. Together, they opened a second store in Harrisburg, Pennsylvania, called "5¢ Woolworth Bros Store", on July 19, 1879, with Sum as manager. During this time, Frank decided to test the possibility of 10¢ items, by devoting a table to the higher-priced items, inside his Lancaster and Harrisburg stores. The ten-cent items were a hit. The success of the Harrisburg store prompted the landlord to seek a higher rent from the Woolworth brothers. Due to the rent dispute, Frank and Sum closed the Harrisburg store and relocated to York, Pennsylvania, in March 1880. The York store closed three months later, on June 30, 1880. This fourth location is often missed, or the city misidentified, in some accounts of the early history of the Woolworth brothers.

Not to be deterred, based on a tip, they both agreed that Sum would scout out Scranton, Pennsylvania, for the next location. Sum liked what he saw in Scranton, and found a good location with a low rental price. He decided to take a chance to rent a space which was larger than needed, and planned to block off the unused portion of the space. This became a Woolworth brothers' pattern going forward, so they could expand the merchandise sales area without the need to move their location. The Scranton store was the first to formally be called a 5 & 10¢ store, opening on November 6, 1880, with the banner over the door which read, "5¢ & 10¢ Woolworth Bro's Store". Scranton was a huge success. Thus began the era of the "five-and-dime" store. As sales grew at a steady pace, in 1881 Frank suggested that Sum buy out Frank's share in the Scranton store, to begin his own affiliated store under his own name. The first affiliate, a franchise of sorts, of the Woolworth brothers was named, "C. S. Woolworth". Frank and Sum were very close brothers. They fully trusted and respected one another. Frank pushed Sum into this idea, because Frank had the vision of what many stores, owned by close friends or relatives, could become. Frank's view of the big picture, the central office perspective, was right. Sum grew his business from the front end, the customer and sales perspective. Sum's Scranton store, at 125 Penn Avenue, soon proved to be too small. His next location was a block away, at 319 Lackawanna Avenue. Again, business was booming and the sales floor soon required more space. Sum expanded the store by adding the next-door property at 317 Lackawanna Avenue.

Sum partnered with one of his long-time friends, Fred Kirby, in 1884, to open a store in Wilkes Barre, Pennsylvania, near Scranton. Fred had experience at Augsbury and Moore of Watertown, New York, as head of wholesale operations. They each put up $600 for a store called "Woolworth and Kirby". The store did very well, and in 1887 Fred bought out Sum's share, in a mutual agreement, and began to expand to more stores.

Frank had incorporated his fast growing chain of stores as "F. W. Woolworth & Co" in 1905. The partner affiliates started to individually incorporate their businesses starting in 1905, following Frank's advice. Sum did not feel the need to do so, because he had a smaller number of stores. Clearly in photographs and on Woolworth postcards, he had incorporated at some point before 1911, as "C. S. Woolworth & Co". Both Frank and Sum invited close friends and relatives into the business over the years. They also sold stock only to relatives, friends and employees. The stock was not sold publicly during this period of growth. This was very much like an early version of a franchise.

Sum continued to develop the front end part of the business and expanded to more stores at a modest pace, while Frank developed his concepts for the back end for the business and aggressively expand to more stores. Sum expanded slower than the other affiliates, but his stores were very high profit stores. Sum liked working with customers and often personally served customers on the sales floor. He would solicit customers' thoughts and ideas, and often incorporated those ideas in the stores. Sum developed his stores with clean high-lustre wood floors, bright interiors, self-service display cases, mahogany counters, glass dividers and show cases, enticing window displays which changed regularly, and low prices for commonly sought-after merchandise. Sum's hands-on approach, carefully selecting managers, resulted in a higher net profit per square foot, for all of his stores versus those of the other affiliates. Frank, who trusted and relied on his brother, managed with a hands-off approach, leaning on his department and store managers. Seeing Sum's high store profits, Frank incorporated Sum's layout and methods in all of his stores, which also became a standard for all of their affiliated stores.

Sum had "C. S. Woolworth" stores in downtown Scranton, westside of Scranton, Pittston, Bradford, Carbondale, and Sunbury, Pennsylvania; Auburn, Elmira, Binghamton, Gloversville, and Glens Falls, New York; Haverhill, Massachusetts, and Portland, Bangor, and Augusta, Maine. Frank expanded his chain of stores rapidly to 337 stores, plus others in partnership with his cousin, Seymour H. Knox. Frank was aggressive. Some of his partners developed additional partners of their own. Seymour Knox, for instance, partnered with Earle Perry Charlton, who began their joint venture with a store in Fall River, Massachusetts. Charlton eventually went on his own. Frank continued to perfect his purchasing concepts for all of the affiliates, and convinced the affiliate partners to "club" together to maximize the lower cost of centralized inventory purchasing. Frank started to buy some factories for certain merchandise, so he could control product costs. He also encouraged the partner rivals to expand, as he aggressively expanded, as well. Woolworth's was so popular and successful, other stores in various cities complained. Some cities attempted to pass laws which would limit or shut out Woolworth stores. The Woolworth brothers' formula is still used by nearly all retail stores, large and small, today.

The Woolworth syndicate of affiliates grew at unprecedented speed for its time. Success did not come without competition. Several very competitive chains sprang up, in direct competition to Woolworth affiliates. Some of those were started by former Woolworth store managers. With competition and success there was a need for more innovation. Sum and Frank differentiated Woolworth's product range from competitors by buying directly from European factories. They developed personal contacts with European factory owners on buying trips to Great Britain and Germany, starting in 1890. Frank also purchased surplus items and sold them at cost, as well as selling teaser items below cost.

Earle Perry Charlton realized, if he continued his operation in New England, he would be in direct competition with Sum and Frank Woolworth, Seymour Knox, and Fred Kirby. He decided to look to Canada. To get capital, he sold nine of his twelve stores to Frank. Charlton's first Canadian stores were in Montreal on Catherine West & Lawrence Street, and St Joseph's Street, and in Ottawa on Sparks Street. He followed those with eight stores in Canada, west of the Rocky Mountains, followed by a return to the US with several store California, including one in South Broadway, Los Angeles, California. He opened stores in Tacoma, Washington, and Sherbrooke, Quebec, and then a very large store in Market Street, San Francisco, California, mere weeks before the 1906 San Francisco earthquake.

In 1912, each of the owners in the syndicate of Woolworth affiliated stores agreed to incorporate all 596 of their stores, as one entity, as "F. W. Woolworth Company". The merger generated more than $30 million in the stock flotation. Frank was elected President of the new combined corporation. The others, Sum Woolworth, Fred Kirby, Seymour Knox, Earle Charlton, and William Moore, became directors.

The Woolworth brothers' many trips to Europe opened their vision of new markets. Keeping with their pattern of bringing relatives and friends into the business, in 1909, Sum and Frank put their second cousin, Fred Moore Woolworth, in charge of opening a subsidiary in Great Britain, "F. W. Woolworth Co Ltd". Fred was joined by three established men in the Woolworth operation, Byron Miller, Samuel Balfour and Charles Hubbard, as well as an Englishman with whom they had dealings, William Lawrence Stephenson. Given wide leeway, the brand took hold rapidly through the UK, in spite of the breakout of war, growing to forty-four stores and exceeding £4 million in profits for 1914–1915.

Likewise, the Woolworth brothers began a significant operation in Germany by 1900, where products were collected and packed for shipping to New York City for re-distribution around the US. In 1914, European made merchandise accounted for 25% of all goods in Woolworth stores. When war broke out, and eventually transatlantic shipping ground to a halt, Frank Woolworth had US factories copy the best-selling products which had been imported from Europe. After the war, Woolworth's European operation grew with the increased demand for their products. The warehouse and shipping operation in Sonneberg was rebuilt and expanded, to include its own train station. A subsidiary in Germany was launched on November 2, 1926.

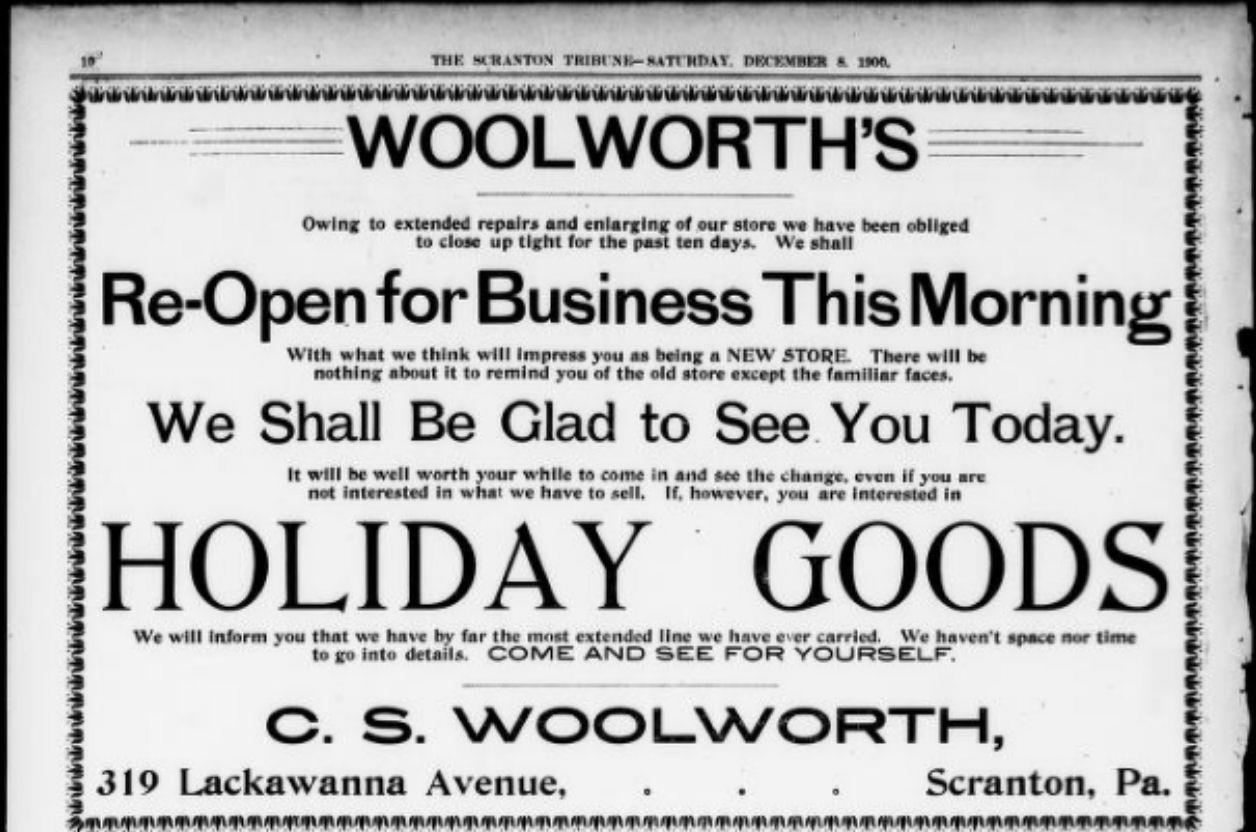
C. S. Woolworth store advertisement, announcing the opening of the expanded and remodeled store at 317-319 Lackawanna Ave., Scranton PA – Dec 8, 1900.

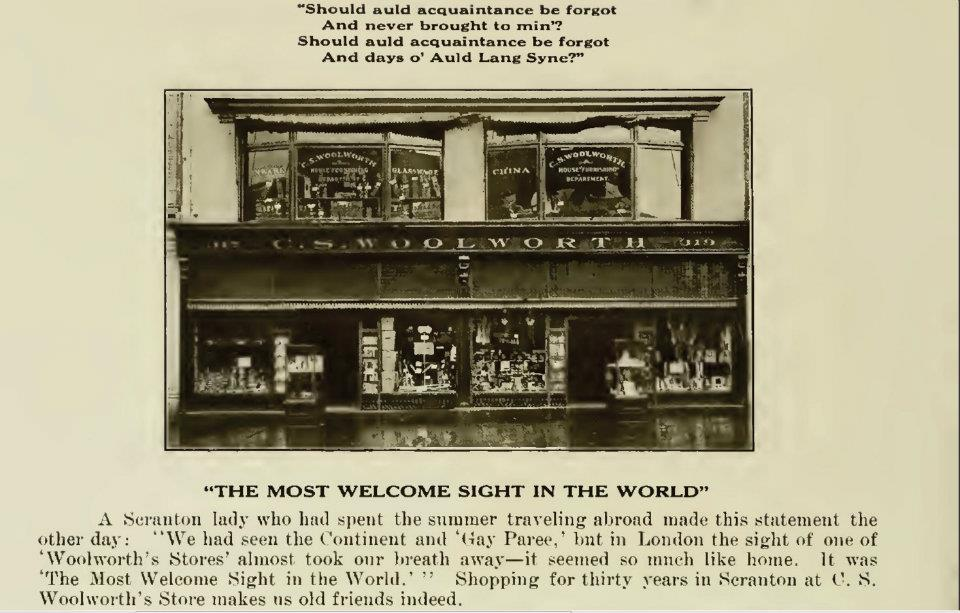
C. S. Woolworth store newspaper picture showing the expanded and remodeled store at 317-319 Lackawanna Ave., Scranton PA – Dec 8, 1900. C. S. Woolworth stores eventually merged into the F. W. Woolworth Company.

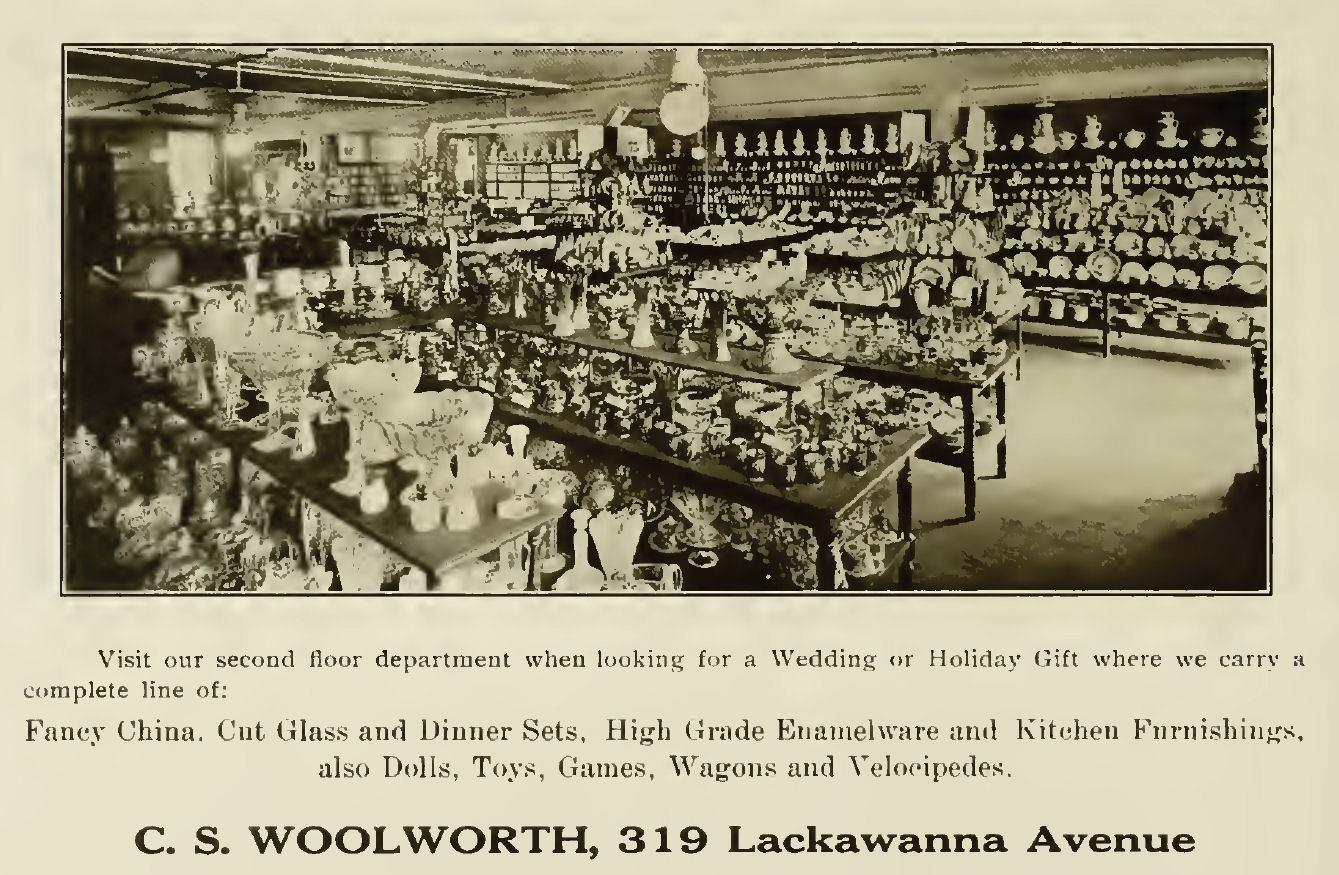
C. S. Woolworth store newspaper picture showing the expanded 2nd floor at 317-319 Lackawanna Ave., Scranton PA – Dec 8, 1900.

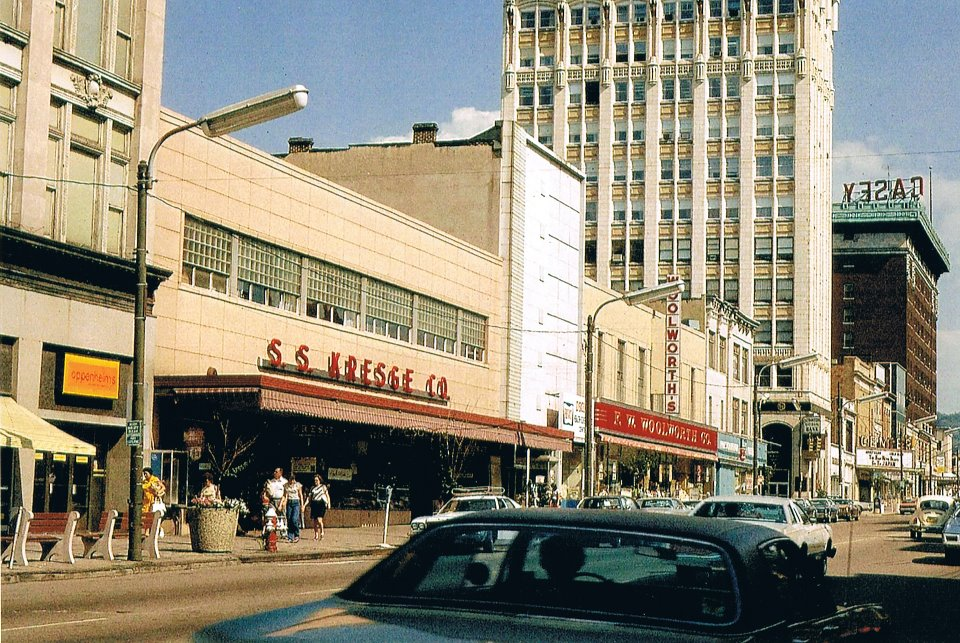
F. W. Woolworth and S. S. Kresge stores on Lackawanna, Avenue, in downtown Scranton, Pennsylvania. The two stores were often found near one another in downtown areas. ca.1978.

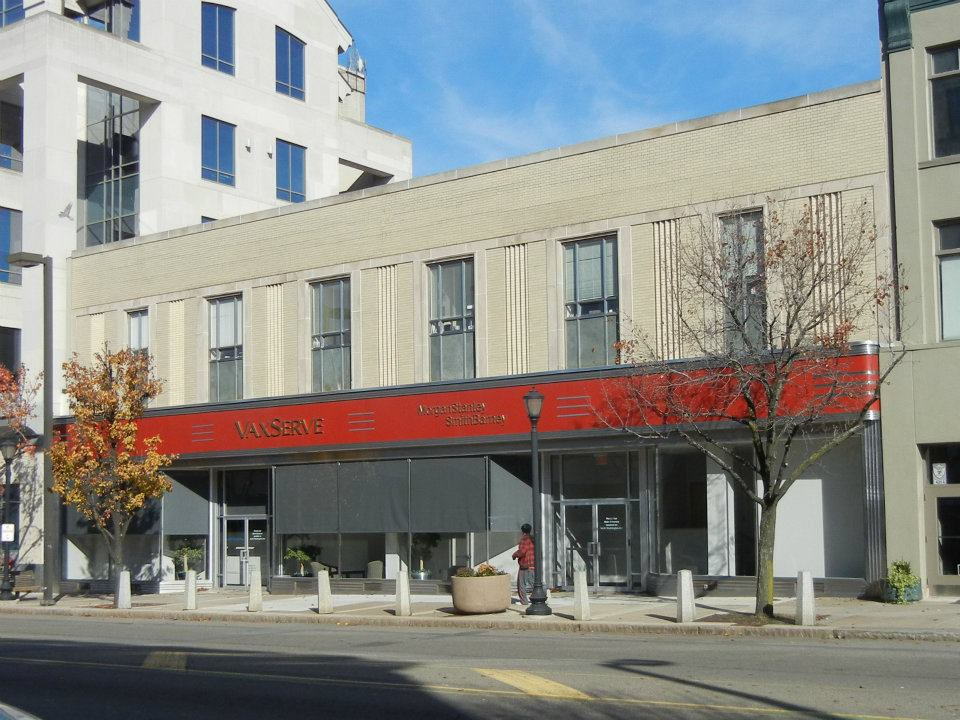
Former F. W. Woolworth, now StanleyMorgan-SmithBarney-VaxServe, at 423-429 Lackawanna Ave, Scranton, PA. 25 November 2011.

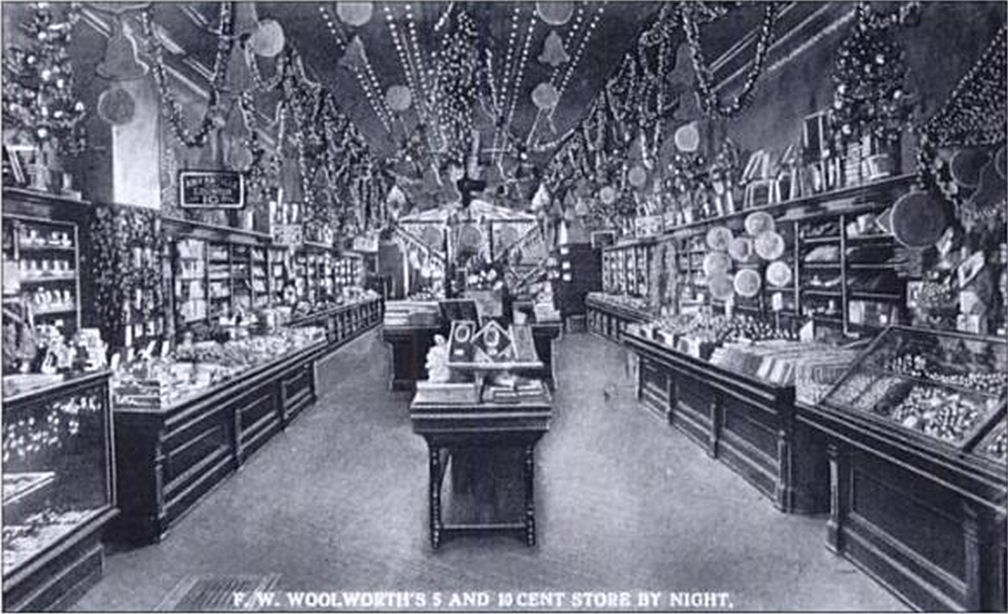
A Woolworth's postcard of the store interior at Christmas season, in New Albany, Indiana. Vintage postcards were typically seen in Woolworth stores. ca.1910.

Sum Woolworth maintained his home base in Scranton. He did not like the political side of the business after the 1912 merger, while the other director partners sought to establish themselves. Sum concentrated on training up-and-coming managers at his Pennsylvania stores. These newly trained managers were dispersed across the entire company, maintaining and setting a style and tone for Woolworth stores worldwide. While keeping a low profile, and seldom mentioned in books and articles about the Woolworth chain, Sum's influence was remarkable and extensive through the entire life of Woolworth companies, as well as across all retailing, to this day.

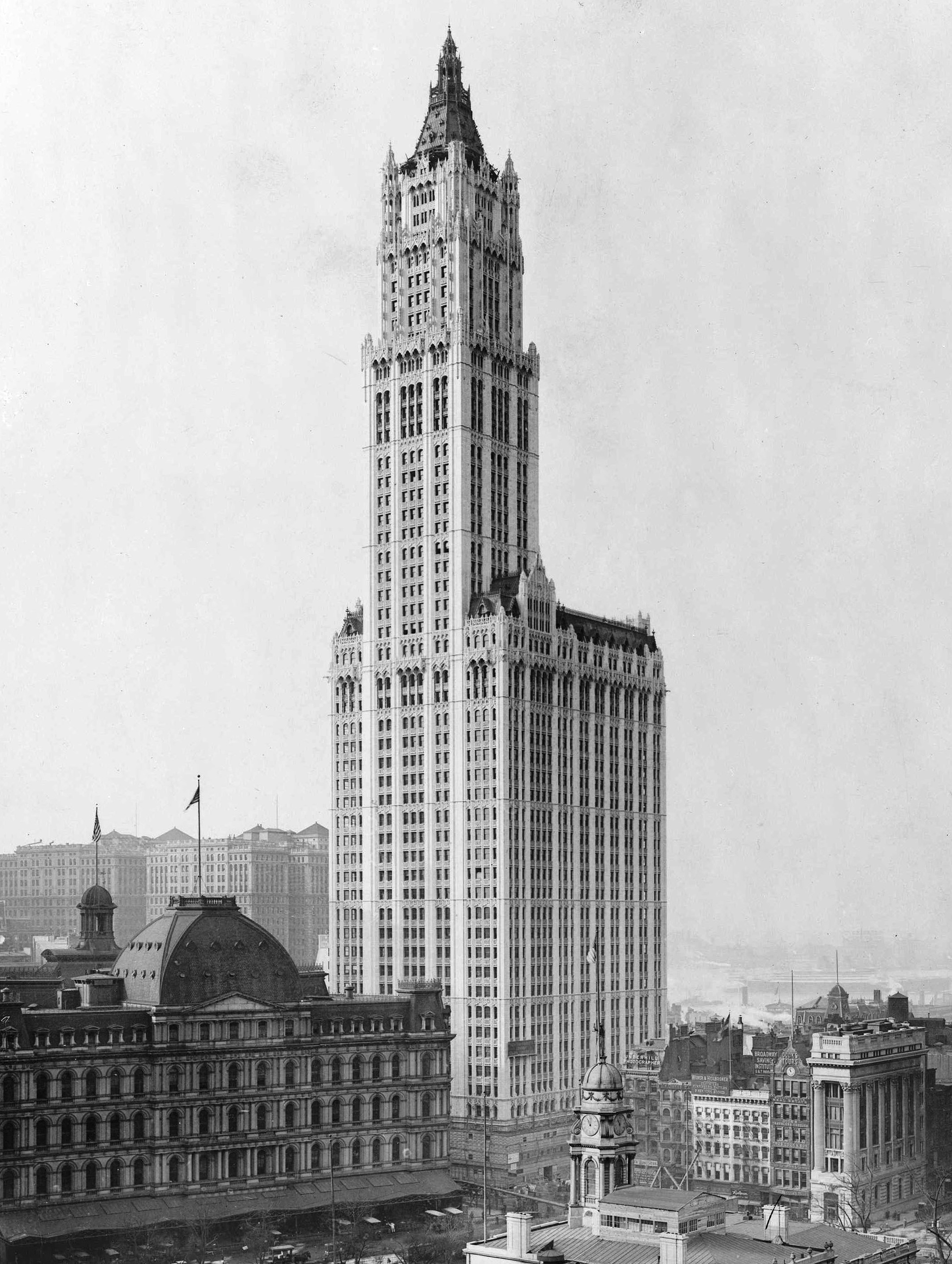
ca. 1913 – The Woolworth Building, 233 Broadway, Manhattan borough, New York City, New York, United States, was the world's tallest building until 1930, financed with cash by Frank W. Woolworth. Many pictures of the World Trade Center twin towers showed the Woolworth Building between them. Later, the WTC twin towers were in the background area of this view.

Frank aggressively grew the chain from the start, yet he always had a paternal approach to his earliest stores, in the US and in England. Similar to his pattern in Lancaster, Pennsylvania, where he built his first successful store, and later, his first "skyscraper" store, in 1910 Frank commissioned the design and construction of a new headquarters in New York City. The Woolworth Building was owned by the Woolworth company (aka Venator Group (1998 to 2001), aka Foot Locker, Inc (2001 to present)) for 85 years. The building was sold in 1998 to the Witkoff Group. The building was a pioneering achievement, designed by American architect Cass Gilbert, and completed in 1913. It was the tallest building in the world (roof height of 792 feet/57 floors), until 1930. It was also unique in that it was financed with cash, and never had a mortgage until recently. When opened on April 24, 1913, all interior lights and exterior flood lights were turned on, when President Woodrow Wilson pushed a button in the White House. Worldwide, people took notice of the Woolworth brothers, their formula and success. Many rivals began to appear on the scene. While Frank was outgoing and gregarious, openly flashing the brand, Sum worked one-on-one with people, improving the Woolworth store experience for customers. Between 1910 and 1920, they seemed unstoppable.

Recent news of the Woolworth Building: "In August 2012, The New York Times reported that an investment group led by Alchemy Properties, a New York developer, bought the top 30 floors of the landmark on July 31 for $68 million (~$94.1 million in 2025) from the Witkoff Group and Cammeby's International. The firm plans to renovate the space into luxury apartments and convert the penthouse into a five-level living-space. The lower 28 floors are still owned by the Witkoff Group and Cammeby International, who plans to lease them as office space."

When Frank died in 1919, Sum was chosen as the Chairman of the Board of F. W. Woolworth Company. Sum served as Chairman for 25 years, with a solid, steady approach on the board. Sum stepped down as Chairman, on February 9, 1944, due to ill health. He was 87 at the time, and remained Honorary Chairman, and a Director.

== Death ==
Charles Sumner Woolworth died on January 7, 1947, in his sleep.

== Legacy ==
During his lifetime, the chain grew from two stores in Pennsylvania, to over 3,000 stores worldwide. There were stores in the UK and Ireland (768), Germany (82), Cuba (8), and Canada (144).Eventually, the store in downtown Scranton relocated to 423-429 Lackawanna Ave, which also had an entrance on N. Washington Avenue. It was a prime location for foot traffic as a short cut between stores on those two streets. People often comment about the lunch counter, buying a large hamburger, an ice cream sundae or a milk shake (the type which is primarily ice cream blended with flavoring and a small amount of milk), and popping a balloon to find out the price of a banana split (a slip of paper with the price was inside the balloon). In later years, another store was opened in the Keyser Oak Shopping Center, in the north section of Scranton. This store had a sizable pet section. It was known for having the largest piranha in captivity (as stated by the sign on the aquarium tank). Woolworth's was popular for a family's first parakeet or turtle. As customers began to do more of their shopping in newly built shopping centers, with large parking lots, Woolworth's added new stores in the shopping centers.

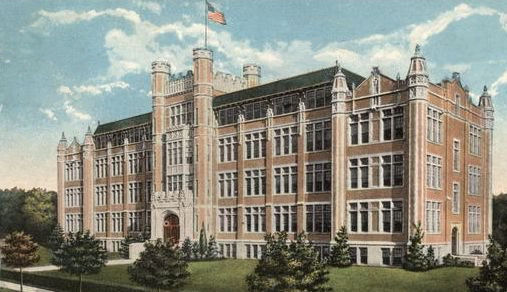
September 29, 1921 – Scranton, Pennsylvania. Women's Domestic Institute (WDI) was a correspondence school, and part of International Correspondence Schools (ICS), both were subsidiaries of International Textbook Company (ITC), and all three were located in Scranton, Pennsylvania. C. S. Woolworth helped found the International Textbook Co, and donated funds to open the Women's Domestic Institute.

Sum's other extensive enterprises include: Serving as a Director of the United States Lumber Company (six million dollars in capital, and owning timber lands and mills in Mississippi, with offices in Scranton); A Director of the Mississippi Central Railroad (it ran from Halliesburg to Natchez, Mississippi, with one hundred and sixty miles of track); A Director of the Scranton Trust Company; Vice-President of the People's National Bank of Scranton; and served on boards of other Scranton businesses. He donated funds to help start the Women's Domestic Institute (WDI) in 1916, and open doors on a new building on September 29, 1921, at 1000 Wyoming Avenue, Scranton, Pennsylvania. The WDI was part of the International Correspondence Schools (ICS); both were subsidiaries of International Textbook Company (ITC), of which Sum was among the founders. ICS and ITC were also located in Scranton, Pennsylvania. The WDI building is now home to Scranton Preparatory School, a Jesuit, private, coeducational high school.

On March 1, 1933, during the movement to boycott Jewish businesses in Germany, Nazi troops sang in front of the Berlin Woolworth Company store. The Hitlerites believed that the Woolworth brothers were Jewish. Yet, they were in fact, Methodist. There is some evidence that Hitler was very fond of Woolworth's stores, as it was one of the few businesses which Hitler did not nationalize. In 1932, the Woolworth Board of Directors was very concerned about their very successful German subsidiary, as National Socialist Party nationalism and anti-American sentiment grew stronger. The directors were somewhat perplexed by the situation, because of the high level of Woolworth investment in Germany. Woolworth's had a sizable workforce at its large warehouse and shipping depot in Sonneberg, Germany. New laws were passed in Germany which prevented profits within Germany from leaving Germany. Essentially, the "F. W. Woolworth CO GMBH" became an entity on its own. The Woolworth Company took a $2 million financial hit to profits, yet the executives tried to stay optimistic that the situation would resolve itself. As war ensued, the twist of fate proved that Woolworth stores were not destroyed by Hitler, but rather, by Allied bombing (US, UK and Canadian Air Forces). Sixty-six stores, of a total of eighty-two, were destroyed. After the war, the German subsidiary recovered at extraordinary speed. While the German stores rebuilt and re-established business, they thrived, while stores in North America and the United Kingdom struggled.

The Woolworth UK subsidiary was sold off in 1982 for a quick cash to cover Woolco real estate debt as a result of deals made for quick expansion in the 1960s. Woolworth in North America (Venator Group) closed its remaining US and Canada Woolworth and Woolco stores on July 17, 1997. Woolworth GMBH in Germany was sold; with the new owner it continued and thrived for another decade. In 2009, Woolworth GMBH went into bankruptcy. In 2010, the Tingelmann Group bought 162 stores from Woolworth GMBH, and soon increased the number of stores to more than 200 by the close of 2011. Tingelmann announced plans to add another 300 stores.

Sum was a staunch Republican in politics. Sum was named after a well-known Massachusetts politician and senator of the time, Charles Sumner, who was a leader of the antislavery forces in Massachusetts and a leader of the Radical Republicans in the United States Senate during the American Civil War, and worked to control the ex-Confederates so as to guarantee equal rights to the Freedmen.

Business positions
Preceded by Frank Woolworth	Chairman of F. W. Woolworth Co; 1919–1944	Succeeded by Foot Locker
Preceded by Frank Woolworth	President of F. W. Woolworth Co; 1919–1944	Succeeded by Foot Locker
