= James Paul Donahue Jr. =

American Socialite

- Born: June 11, 1915; Greenwich, Connecticut, United States
- Died: December 6, 1966 (aged 51); Manhattan, New York, United States
- Occupation: Socialite
- Relatives: F. W. Woolworth (grandfather); Barbara Hutton (cousin)

James Paul Donahue Jr. (June 11, 1915 – December 6, 1966) was an heir to the Woolworth estate and a New York City socialite.

== Early life ==
Jimmy Donahue was the second son of James Paul Donahue (1887–1931), the scion of an Irish American family which had made a fortune in the fat rendering business (Retail Butchers' Fat Rendering Company), by his wife Jessie (née Woolworth) Donahue (1886–1971), one of the three daughters of Frank Winfield "F. W." Woolworth, founder of the Woolworth retail chain. His older brother was Woolworth Donahue (1913–1972) who brought a cheetah to Cannes following a safari.

Donahue was a nephew of Edna Woolworth (1883–1917), a wealthy socialite and a nephew by marriage of Franklyn Laws Hutton (1877–1940), a co-founder of the brokerage firm E. F. Hutton & Co. He was also the first cousin and confidant of the American socialite Barbara Hutton (1912–1979).

Donahue was a high school dropout. He initially attended the Hun School in Princeton, New Jersey, and after his parents were advised to remove him from there, he was shifted to the Choate School in Connecticut. However, he was expelled from that school at age 17. Following his expulsion from Choate he took tap dance lessons with the tap dance master Bill "Bojangles" Robinson. Despite his mother's opposition, he made a brief debut as a dancer in a Broadway musical production that closed ten days after its opening in September 1933.

=== Draft ===
In 1944, the then-29-year-old Donahue was notified in Florida, where he had been flying with the Civil Air Patrol for two years (and carried on the Army Air Force reserve inactive list while flying with CAP), that he had been classified 1-A by his draft board and would be inducted. He fought reporting to New York but the draft board denied his request. Thereafter, he returned to New York where he was sworn into the U.S. Army

== Career ==
Having been born into a wealthy family, Donahue never felt the need to earn a living, and indeed he lived lavishly, travelling the world with a valet in tow and staying at the most expensive hotels. He was known within his circle by the nickname "Jeem".

A playboy by nature, he was a gay man at a time when homosexual acts were illegal. Though press agents arranged for him to be seen with female escorts, his pursuits, until he met Wallis, Duchess of Windsor, were exclusively homosexual. In 1950, he was 35 when befriended by the Duke of Windsor and the Duchess. He claimed he had had a four-year affair with Simpson. This claim was verified by Lady Pamela Hicks, daughter of Lord Mountbatten, a cousin of the Duke of Windsor.

Donahue died in 1966 at the age of 51. He is buried in the Woolworth Family Mausoleum at Woodlawn Cemetery in the Bronx, New York.
