= Dave Marinaccio =

Dave Marinaccio (b. 1952 born in Connecticut) is an American advertising executive and a best-selling author. His works include All I Really Need to Know I Learned from Watching Star Trek (1994), All the Other Things I Really Need to Know I Learned from Watching Star Trek the Next Generation (1998), and Admen, Mad Men, and the Real World of Advertising: Essential Lessons for Business and Life (2015). He is Chief Creative Officer at LMO Advertising, located in Arlington, Virginia.

== Biography ==
His father, Alexander Teresio Marinaccio, was of Italian descent. Marinaccio attended Catholic elementary school and public high school in Enfield, Connecticut, after which he graduated from the University of Connecticut with a BS degree in Home Economics (he has told how he initially entered that course of study to be near a certain university student). After college he worked at several jobs, then tried his hand at stand-up comedy with The Second City workshop in Chicago, Illinois. From there he moved into advertising, working first as a copywriter at the firm J. Walter Thompson. After stints at Foote, Cone & Belding, DMB&B, DDB Needham, and Bozell Worldwide, he helped found LMO Advertising where he is the "M." His career in advertising has spanned 35 years.

While working as a copy writer, he was urged to write a book about his near-obsession with the 1960s television series Star Trek. In the book, he explains how he is able to date hot young women by using the lesson he learned from Captain Kirk.

== See also ==
- All I Really Need to Know I Learned in Kindergarten by Robert Fulghum
