= You Only Move Twice =

- The Simpsons episode
- Hank Scorpio greeting the Simpson family upon their arrival in Cypress Creek.
- Episode no.: Season 8 Episode 2
- Directed by: Mike B. Anderson
- Written by: John Swartzwelder
- Production code: 3F23
- Original air date: November 3, 1996

Guest appearances
- Albert Brooks as Hank Scorpio (credited as A. Brooks); Sally Stevens as 'Scorpio' Singer (uncredited)

Episode features
- Chalkboard gag: "I did not learn everything I need to know in kindergarten"
- Couch gag: Everyone parachutes into the living room, except Homer, who falls flat on the floor.
- Commentary: Matt Groening; Josh Weinstein; Ken Keeler; Dan Castellaneta; Mike B. Anderson

Episode chronology
| ← Previous "Treehouse of Horror VII" | Next → "The Homer They Fall" |
- The Simpsons season 8

"You Only Move Twice" is the second episode of the eighth season of the American animated television series The Simpsons. It first aired on the Fox network in the United States on November 3, 1996. The episode, based on a story idea by Greg Daniels, has the family move to a new town. Homer starts to work for a friendly, sympathetic boss, Hank Scorpio, who, unbeknownst to Homer, is a supervillain. Bart, Lisa and Marge each have individual secondary storylines. John Swartzwelder wrote the episode, which was directed by Mike B. Anderson.

The episode's title is a reference to the James Bond film You Only Live Twice. Many elements of the episode parody the Bond films, with a character modeled after Bond making a brief appearance. Setting the second and third acts in a new town, Cypress Creek, required the animators to create entirely new layouts and background designs. Albert Brooks, in his fourth appearance on The Simpsons, guest stars as the voice of Hank Scorpio, one of the most popular one-time characters in the entire series. The episode has received critical acclaim. IGN named "You Only Move Twice" the best episode of the eighth season and Albert Brooks as one of the best guest stars in the history of the show.

== Plot ==
Smithers is offered a job at the Globex Corporation but turns it down. Being the next-longest tenured employee of the plant, Homer gets the job. He informs his family that the new job pays better but involves them moving to Cypress Creek. The family initially opposes the move, but they watch a video about the planned community and, seeing that it is much nicer than Springfield, agree to move there. Abandoning their house, the Simpsons pack up and leave town.

In Cypress Creek, Homer's new boss, Hank Scorpio, stops by the family's new house to introduce himself. Scorpio takes a shine to Homer and makes him the chief motivator in the nuclear division. Meanwhile, Bart starts school, but he soon finds that his new class is far above the standards of Springfield Elementary and is sent to a remedial education class. Lisa goes for a nature walk and discovers she is allergic to all the wildlife around Cypress Creek. Marge tries to go about her daily chores, but discovers that the house has an automated system to do chores for her. Marge loses her sense of purpose and begins drinking wine.

On Homer's first day at work, Scorpio gives him a tour of the company and listens with interest to his secret dream of owning the Dallas Cowboys football team. He tells Homer that his dream may come true someday. Homer does an excellent job of motivating his team. During a meeting with Homer, Scorpio excuses himself, turns to a screen, and threatens the United Nations Security Council by saying they have 72 hours to deliver an unspecified amount of gold or face the consequences via a doomsday device, and blows up the 59th Street Bridge as proof of his capabilities. Homer remains oblivious to Scorpio's supervillainous tendencies, which include work on the aforementioned doomsday device and attempting to kill his arch-nemesis, Mr. Bont, with a laser. Bont escapes, Homer tackles him, and Scorpio praises Homer. Scorpio's guards shoot Bont.

At dinner, Homer proudly tells the family how well he is doing at work, but he discovers they hate Cypress Creek and want to return to Springfield. Dejected, Homer visits Scorpio for advice while the United States Army Special Forces assault Globex HQ. Scorpio advises Homer to do what's best for his family. Scorpio straps on a flamethrower and holds his ground while Homer sadly walks away, kicking a grenade in the process. The next day, the family returns to Springfield, and Homer receives the Denver Broncos as a present from Scorpio, who has successfully managed to seize the East Coast of the United States.

== Production ==
For the town of Cypress Creek, the animators had to design entirely new background paintings such as this one.

The episode, along with "El Viaje Misterioso de Nuestro Jomer", was produced for the seventh season. The episode's original concept came from a story idea by Greg Daniels. The writing staff came up with three major concepts. The first involves the Simpson family moving away from Springfield. The writers initially hoped the audience would be fooled into thinking the move was permanent. As a result, they tried to work in as many characters during the episode's first act to make it seem that the family was really leaving. The second involved Homer getting a new job with an employee-friendly boss—in stark contrast to the tyrannical Mr. Burns. The third was that Homer's new boss would be a supervillain resembling Ernst Stavro Blofeld. This element was meant to be in the background, unbeknownst to Homer.

The writers sought to give every family member their own story. They spent some time arguing over whether to include the depressing idea of Marge becoming an alcoholic in the episode. There was originally another idea involving Grampa Simpson. He is left behind in Springfield and receives recorded greeting phone calls from the family. The plot went on for four sequences, all of which were cut from the episode because of time constraints but were later included in the DVD release.

The show's writers did not worry too much about perfecting Scorpio's lines because they knew Albert Brooks, who was voice acting the character, would rewrite or ad lib most of them. Entire sections of Scorpio's dialogue such as his hammock speech are Brooks's lines, not the writers'. Dan Castellaneta described how, after he prepared something for Homer to say in response to Brooks's new Scorpio lines, Brooks would deliver totally different lines on the next take. Show runner Josh Weinstein said Homer's reactions are exactly like those of someone talking to Albert Brooks. In all, his recordings were over two hours long.

For "about a week", he was to reprise the role of Scorpio for The Simpsons Movie, but the staff felt that a new character was a better idea and created the character of Russ Cargill for Brooks to voice.

The animators needed to design completely new sets for the episode. Christian Roman, John Reiss and Mike Anderson storyboarded the episode. In the original animatic, Santa's Little Helper and Snowball II were not present, so the animators went back and added them, even though they are not a part of the story. It is a common misconception that Scorpio's design was modeled after Richard Branson. The final design, which underwent an overhaul, was hailed by the writers as "the perfect madman". All the students in Bart's remedial class were initially given hair modeled on Ralph Wiggum's, but the staff felt that the children looked "kinda troubled", so their designs were altered.

Mr. Bont, the man Homer tackles, was initially supposed to be James Bond, but Fox would not let the writers use the name because of concerns over possible lawsuits. They finally decided on "Bont" because it was the most similar name they could legally use.

== Cultural references ==
At the beginning of the episode, Waylon Smithers hums "I work for Monty Burns, M-M-M-M-M-M-Monty Burns" to the tune of "Hooray for Hollywood". The sign at the elementary school displays http://www.studynet.edu. Weinstein called it "one of the show's most obviously dated jokes" because the idea of a school having its own website was almost a novelty in 1996.

The final scene at Globex contains several references to action and James Bond films. The episode's title and many references are from the Bond film You Only Live Twice, as well as an allusion to A View to a Kill. Homer tackles and inadvertently helps get a character modeled after Sean Connery's Bond killed, following a parody of the laser scene from Goldfinger. Miss Goodthighs from the 1967 James Bond parody Casino Royale makes an appearance in the episode. She can be seen attacking a character modeled after U.S. Army General Norman Schwarzkopf.

"Scorpio", the song played over the end credits, is a parody of various Bond themes. Ken Keeler originally wrote it to be three seconds longer and sound more like the Goldfinger theme, but the final version was shorter and the lyrics were sped up. The writers wanted the song to be sung by Shirley Bassey, who sang several Bond themes, but they could not get her to record the part. It appears on Go Simpsonic with The Simpsons.

Homer's disappointment at being given the Denver Broncos in lieu of the Dallas Cowboys was a reference to the Cowboys' success at the time. When the episode was aired, the Cowboys had won a then-record five Super Bowls and were the defending Super Bowl champions while the Broncos had yet to win a league title; moreover, the American Football Conference of which the Broncos were part had not won the Super Bowl since the 1983 season. Ironically, in real life the Broncos have been the far more successful team since the episode was aired, appearing in four Super Bowls and winning three. In contrast, the Cowboys have not appeared in the Super Bowl or the NFC Championship Game since 1996. Since Homer Simpson took "ownership" of the Broncos in this episode, as of October 2025, the team has not lost to the Dallas Cowboys. In the eight games that the two teams have played since this episode aired, the Broncos are 8-0, outscoring the Cowboys by a combined score of 276-183.

== Reception ==
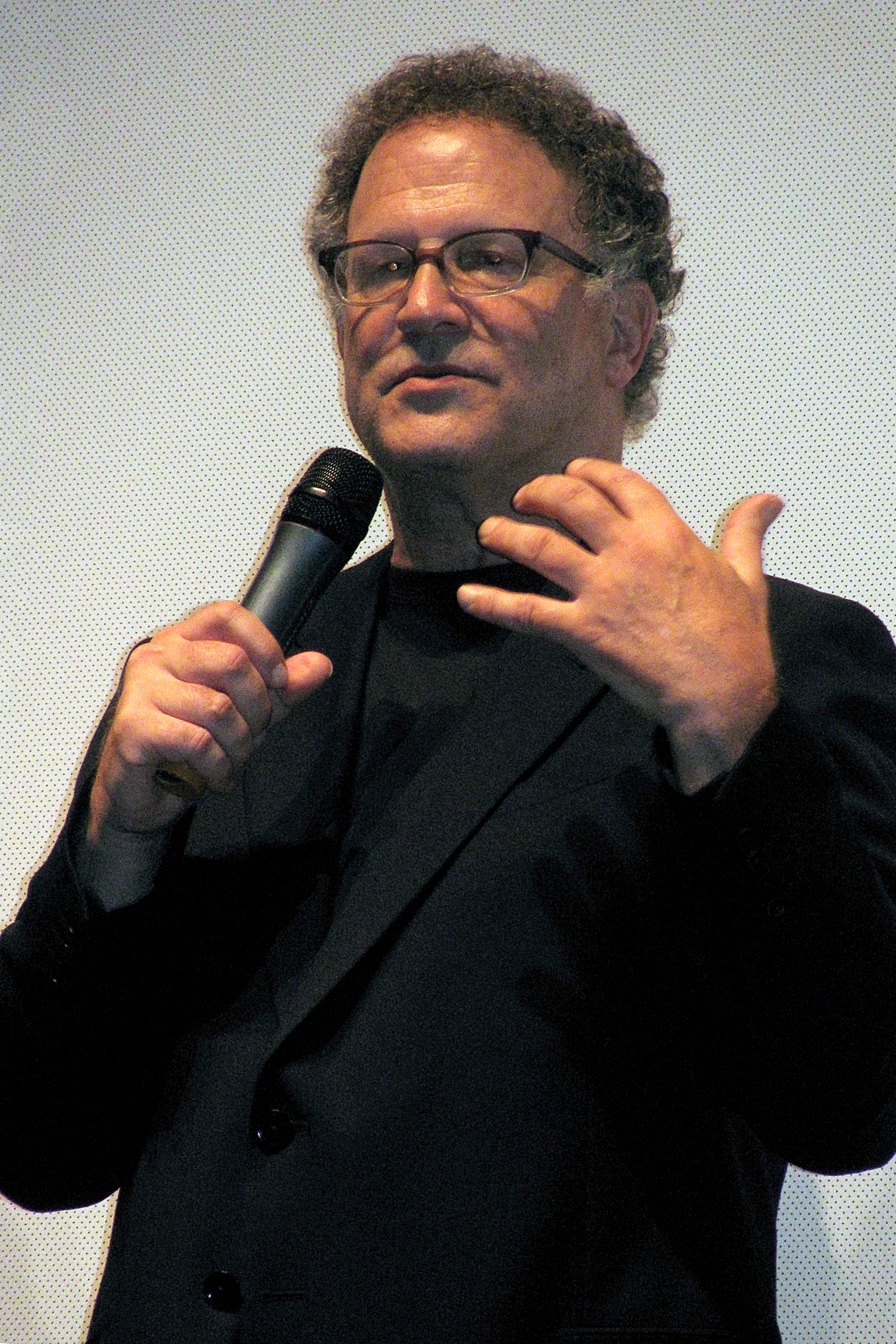
Albert Brooks, who voiced the character of Hank Scorpio

After its original broadcast, "You Only Move Twice" finished 50th in the Nielsen ratings for the week of October 28 – November 3, 1996, with a rating of 8.5, equivalent to approximately 8.2 million viewing households. It was the second highest-rated show on the Fox network that week, following The X-Files.

Since airing, the episode has received universal acclaim from fans and television critics. In 2006, IGN named Brooks The Simpsons' best guest star citing Scorpio as his best role. The Phoenix.com also placed Brooks at the top of their best guest voices list of Simpsons characters. In his book Planet Simpson, author Chris Turner says Brooks is second only to Phil Hartman among the show's guest stars writing that he "brings hilarious satirical seamlessness to Scorpio's paradoxical nature". He believes the delivery of Scorpio's final line—"But Homer, on your way out if you wanna kill somebody, it would help me a lot."—seals Brooks's place in The Simpsons' history. The Simpson family's new street address, 15201 Maple Systems Road, is writer Ken Keeler's favorite street name in the show.

IGN also picked the episode as the best of the eighth season, saying it "is a wonderful example of slowly building up the comedy [...] it's impossible to fathom this one not being very high up on any list of the best Simpsons episodes of all time." Reviewer Robert Canning gave the episode a "Masterful" score of ten out of ten, saying the episode "may well be the greatest Simpsons episode of all time". Gary Russell and Gareth Roberts, authors of the book I Can't Believe It's a Bigger and Better Updated Unofficial Simpsons Guide, called it "a tremendous episode" saying it has "some really good moments, most of them involving Bart, Lisa, and Marge's loathing for Cypress Creek. The remedial kids are fab (especially Warren), and Lisa's second chipmunk encounter is inspired. Scorpio is a good character, especially his Christopher Walken-esque killing spree." They named the owl grabbing the chipmunk during Lisa's trip to the forest one of the greatest sight gags in the show's history. Chris Turner also felt that the remedial boy Gordy's line may be "the broadest parody of a Canadian accent in the history of American pop culture". Ben Rayner of the Toronto Star included "You Only Move Twice" on his list of the best episodes of The Simpsons. In his review of The Complete Eighth Season DVD set, Raul Burriel described it as one of the "most clever episodes the series has ever given us". Entertainment.ie named it among the 10 greatest Simpsons episodes of all time. In 2019, Consequence of Sound ranked it number seven on its list of top 30 Simpsons episodes. In 2020, Al Jean acknowledged "You Only Move Twice" as an episode many consider a favorite. In The A.V. Club, Erik Adams called it one of the best episodes of the season. He praises the climactic scene: "It's as good an approximation of this type of James Bond sequence as you'll see outside of the first Austin Powers movie, with the added twist that Homer's resignation holds our attention better than any cauldron of scalding-hot green liquids. Character and relationship holds sway—even when one of those characters is strapping on a flamethrower."
