= David Herbert =

British writer and interior decorator

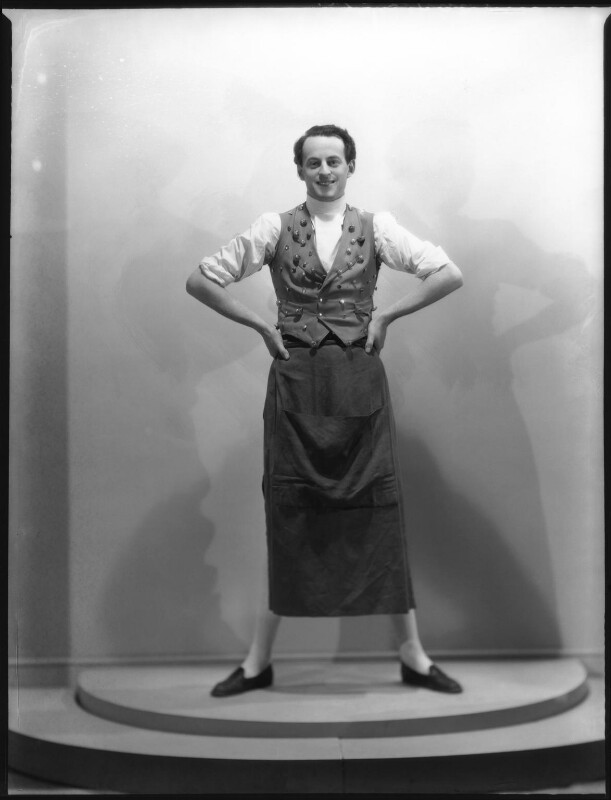
David Herbert in 1940

The Honourable David Alexander Reginald Herbert (3 October 1908 – 3 April 1995) was a British socialite and writer, seen in the 1920s as one of the Bright Young Things.

== Early life and education ==
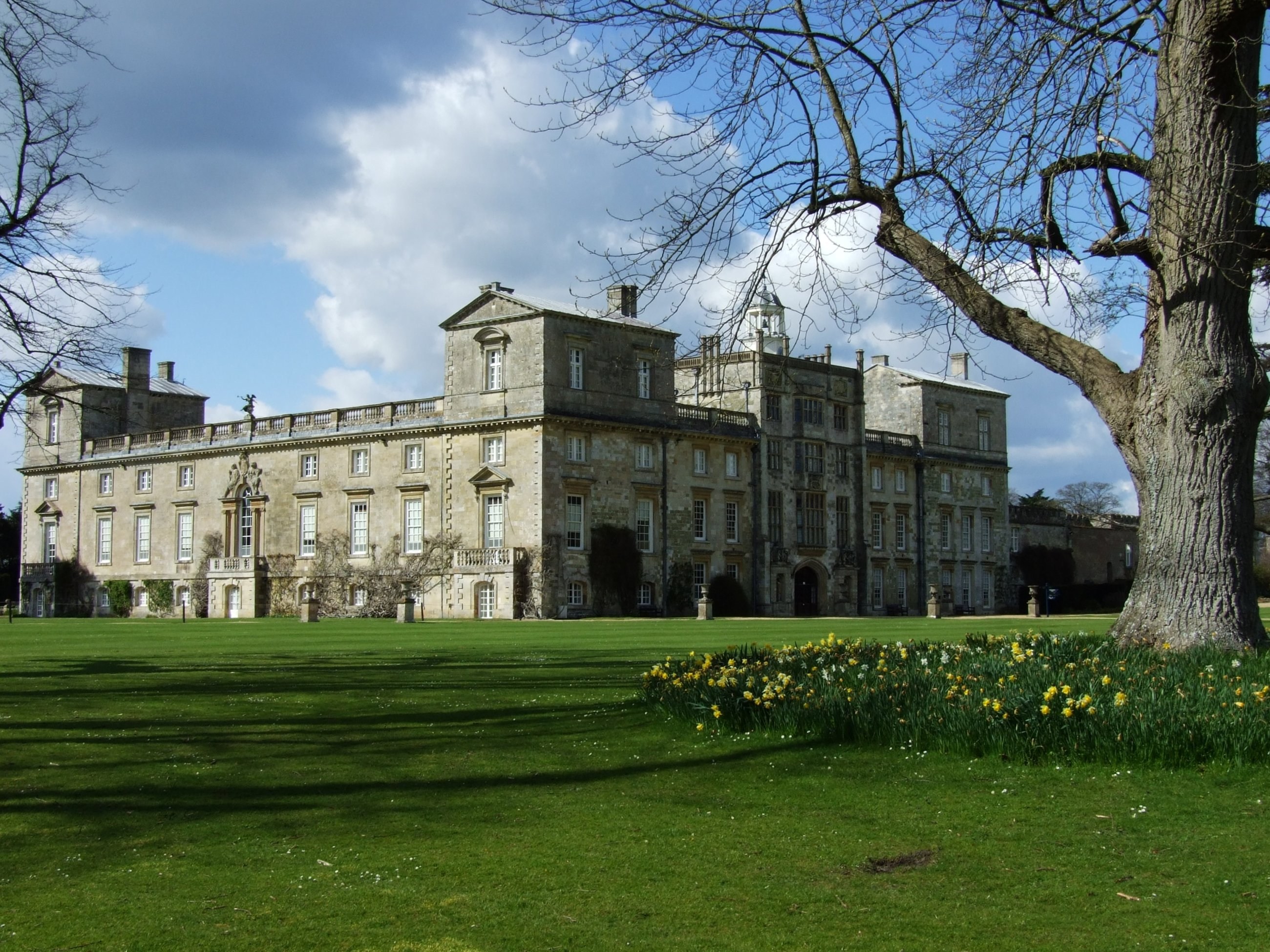
Wilton House

David Herbert was the second son of Reginald Herbert, 15th Earl of Pembroke. He spent some of his early years at Castletown House in Ireland, while his father was an aide de camp to Sir Arthur Paget, Commander-in-Chief, Ireland. At the age of four, he moved to the family seat of Wilton House, near Salisbury, and from there was educated as a boarder at Wixenford School and Eton College.

== Career ==
Herbert had brief periods as a film actor, appearing in 1930's Knowing Men, and as a cabaret performer. He briefly shared an apartment with Noël Coward in the East End, and was satirized by Lord Berners as the character Daisy Montgomery in his 1936 satiric novel, The Girls of Radcliff Hall. He was also scathingly satirized as "Peter Barclay" in William Bayer's novel Tangier.

He first visited Tangier, Morocco, in 1933 with Poppet John, a daughter of Augustus John, and took a property there where he could afford to maintain a standard of living beyond his means in England. Apart from a house with a large garden, there were cottages, in which his servants lived, a cook, a housemaid, two gardeners, and a Moroccan manservant-chauffeur. He spent almost fifty years in Tangier, where he was known for his vibrant personality, frequent lavish parties, good taste, and ruthless snobbery. He was referred to by Ian Fleming as 'the Queen Mother of Tangier'. He was labelled as the 'most terrible snob' by author Patrick Thursfield, who attended his famous parties.

During the Second World War, Herbert served in the Royal Naval Volunteer Reserve.

Herbert's books recall his years in the company of such figures as Cecil Beaton, Lady Diana Cooper, Noël Coward, Paul and Jane Bowles, Cyril Connolly, Brian Howard, Barbara Hutton, Osbert Sitwell and Tallulah Bankhead. These include Second Son: An Autobiography (1972), which included a foreword by Paul Bowles and photographs by Cecil Beaton, Engaging Eccentrics: Recollections (1990), his second volume of autobiography, and Relations and Revelations: Advice to Jemima (1992), a book of memories and opinions written in the form of advice to his great-niece Jemima.

== Death ==
Herbert died of kidney failure in 1995 and was buried in the cemetery at Saint Andrew's Church, Tangier. He had been a devout Anglican. On his tombstone was engraved, "He loved Morocco".

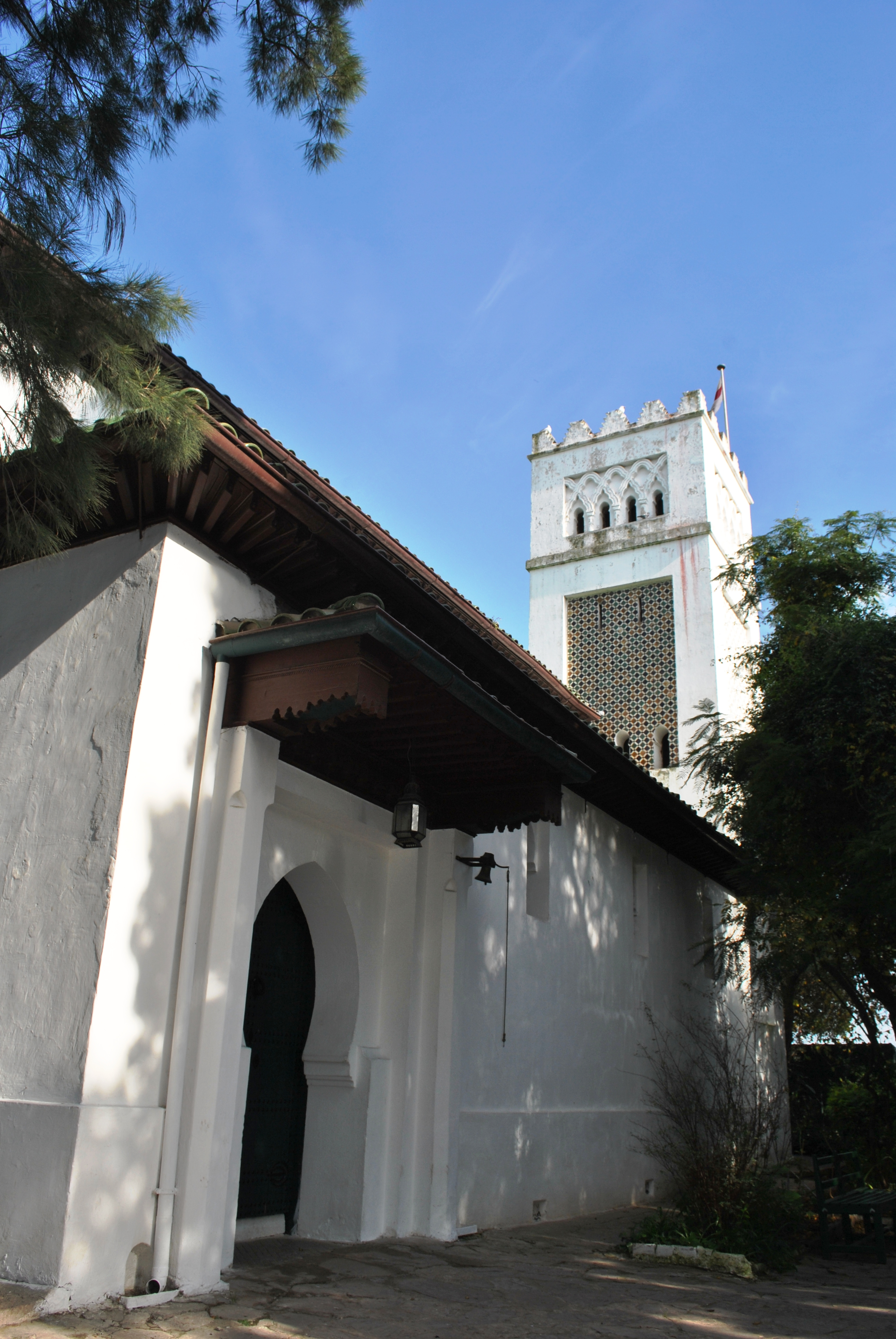
Church of St. Andrew's, Tangier, Morocco

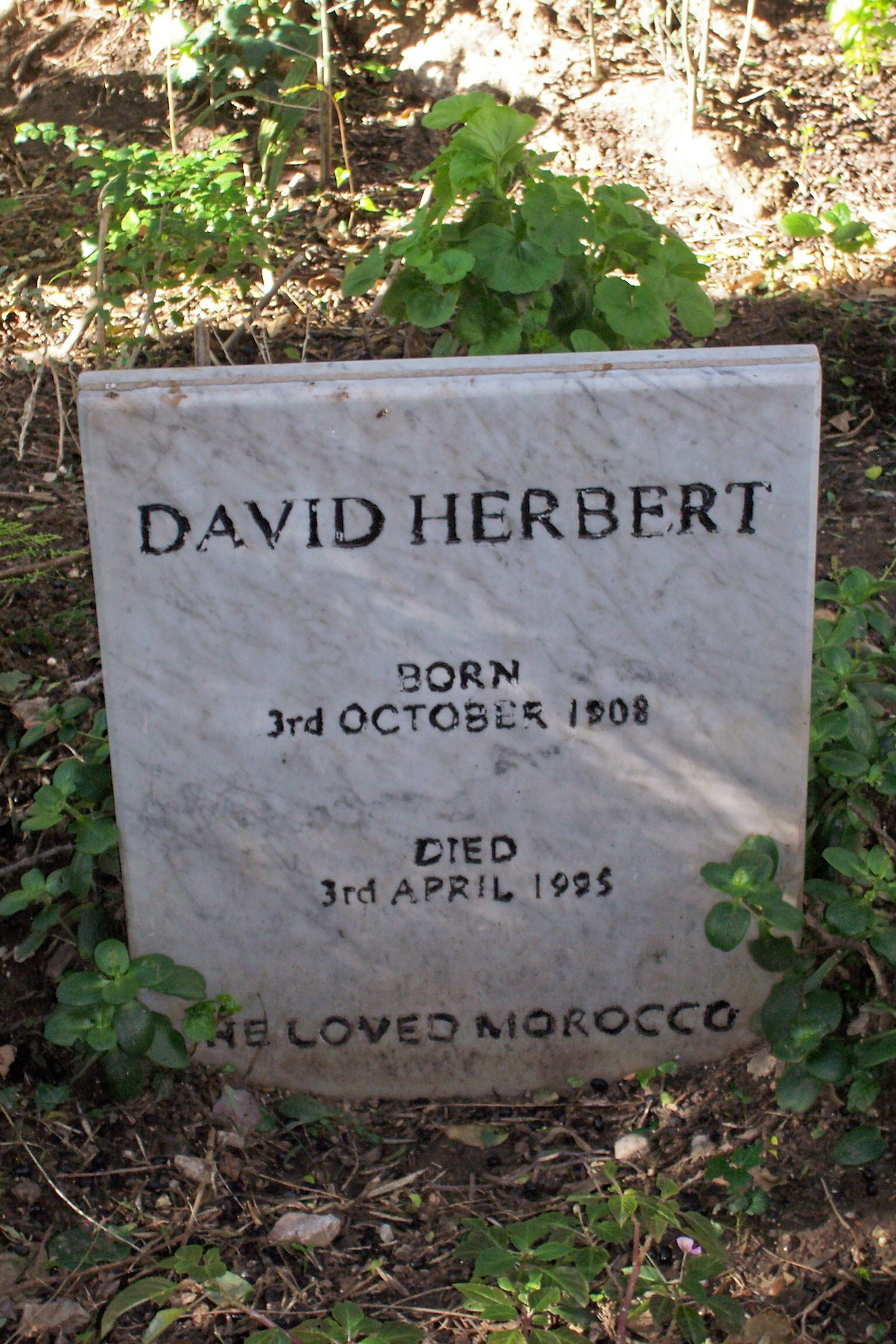
tomb of David Herbert
