= Lester Persky =

American producer

- Born: July 6, 1925; New York City, New York, U.S.
- Died: December 16, 2001 (aged 76); Los Angeles, California, U.S.
- Other names: P. J. Lester
- Occupations: Film, television and theatre producer

Lester Persky (July 6, 1925 – December 16, 2001) was an American film, television, and theatre producer.

== Early life and career ==
Born in Brooklyn, New York, Persky attended Brooklyn College before serving in the Merchant Navy during World War II. After the war, he worked at The New York Times and later as a copywriter at an advertising agency. Persky later opened his own successful ad agency.

In 1964, Andy Warhol used some of Persky's collection of old TV ads as part of Warhol's film Soap Opera (1964).

As a producer, Persky won a Primetime Emmy Award for his work on the miniseries A Woman Named Jackie. Persky also attempted to produce a miniseries based on the life of Howard Hughes with Terry Moore serving as a consultant.

== Death ==
On December 16, 2001, Persky died of complications following heart surgery in Los Angeles.

== Filmography ==
Film
Year	Film	Notes
1968	Boom!	Associate producer
1971	Fortune and Men's Eyes	Producer
1977	Equus	Producer
1979	Hair	Producer
1979	Yanks	Producer
Television
Year	Title	Notes
1987	Poor Little Rich Girl: The Barbara Hutton Story	Executive producer
1991	A Woman Named Jackie	Executive producer
1995	Liz: The Elizabeth Taylor Story	Executive producer
