= Haugwitz family =

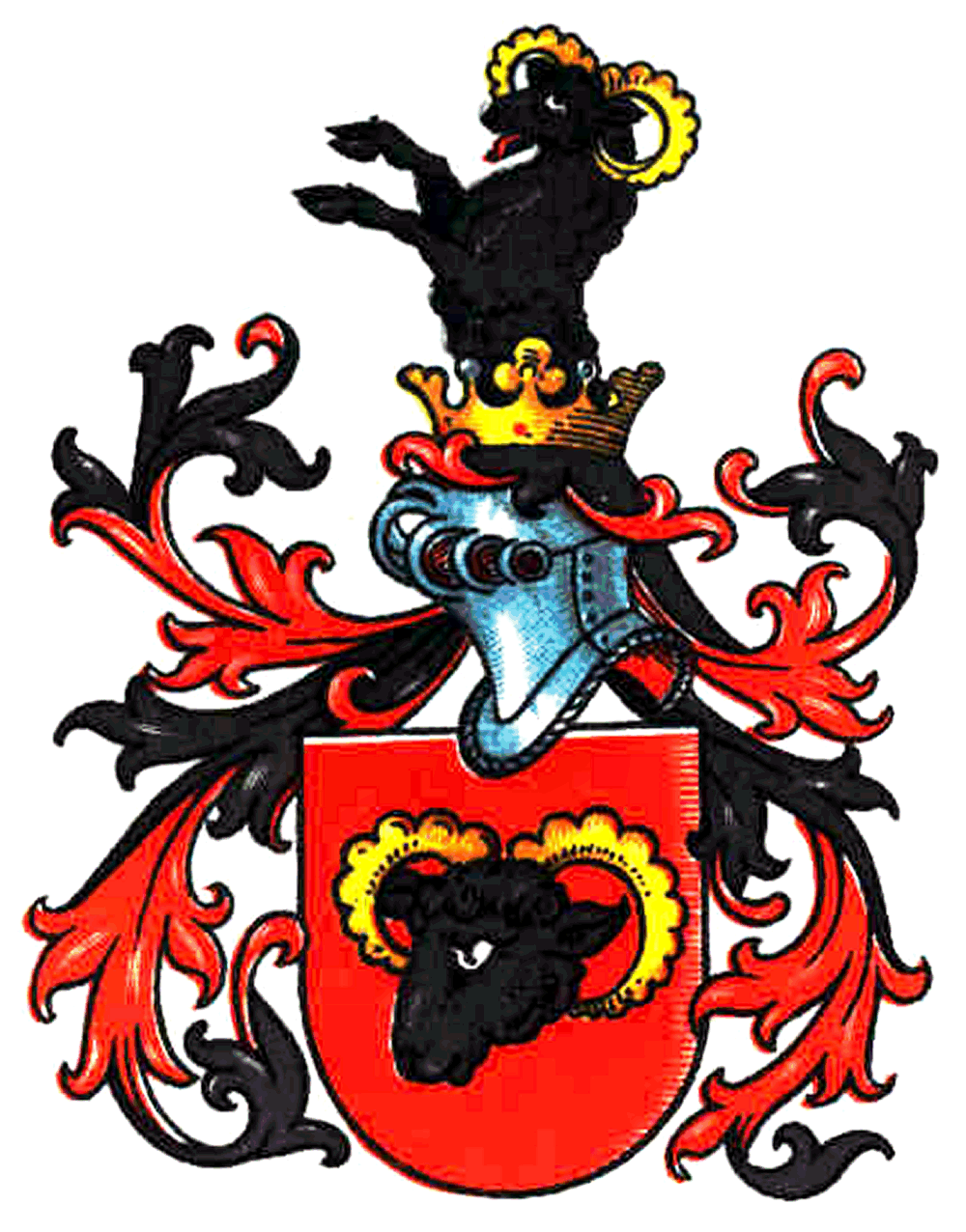
Coat of arms of the Counts von Haugwitz

The Haugwitz family (German: Graf von Haugwitz, Czech: Haugvicové) is an old and influential Saxon noble family originating from the Meissen region.

== History ==
The Haugwitzs are an ancient aristocratic family from the Lusatia region.

It spread to the area of Germany (Meissen), Silesia (where more than 12 lineages were created), then to Bohemia and Moravia. At the beginning of the 15th century, the important representatives of the family included Mikuláš Haugvic from Tuhaneč, the court Marshal of Queen Sophia, the wife of Wenceslaus IV of Bohemia. In 1346, the brothers Otto, Sweydiger, and Kilian von Haugwitz settled in Biskupice, Silesia, who founded the new dynastic Haugvic family from Biskupice, which continued to function independently and eventually became the most important Haugvic faction in Bohemia, Moravia, and Silesia. This lasted from 1494 to 1668.

== Lines of the family ==
As of now, four lines of the Haugwitz family are public:

- 1) Haugwitz from the Meissen line (to this day in Germany)
- 2) Haugwitz family from Malá Obíše (to this day in Austria, Canada, Denmark, Sweden)
- 3) Haugwitz family from the Prussian line (to this day in Moravia)

== Notable members ==
- Anna Margareta von Haugwitz, wife of Swedish count, statesman and military commander Carl Gustaf Wrangel
- Georg von Haugwitz
- Johann IX. von Haugwitz (1524-1595), Bishop of Meissen
- August Adolph von Haugwitz
- Friedrich Wilhelm Graf von Haugwitz (1702, Saxony – 1765), Austrian statesman
- Christian August Heinrich Kurt Graf von Haugwitz (1752, Silesia – 1832), Prussian statesman
- Luise von Haugwitz (1782–1855)
- Lawrence (Lance) Graf von Haugwitz-Hardenberg-Reventlow (1936–1972), only child of heiress Barbara Hutton
