= C. David Heymann =

American author (1945–2012)

C. David Heymann (14 January 1945 – 9 May 2012), born Clemens Claude Oscar Heymann, was an American author; whose bestselling biographies of celebrities and political figures gained criticism for historical disputes, inaccuracies and inventions.

== Early life ==
Heymann was born in New York City into a German-Jewish family. He earned a degree in hotel management at Cornell University in 1966, and English Literature at State University of New York. Heymann pursued a Master's degree in writing at the University of Massachusetts at Amherst, and a doctorate in English Literature at the State University of New York.

== Career ==
Heymann's first two publications, biographies on poets Ezra Pound and James Russell Lowell, were not commercial successes. His next attempt, Poor Little Rich Girl: The Life and Legend of Barbara Hutton was an instant bestseller. Published by Random House, it was made into the 1987 television biographical drama Poor Little Rich Girl: The Barbara Hutton Story starring Farrah Fawcett. Several bestselling biographies followed in succession, mostly focusing on the Kennedy family; in particular, Robert F. Kennedy, John F. Kennedy, Jacqueline Kennedy Onassis and their children. The unauthorized biography, A Woman Named Jackie: An Intimate Biography of Jackie Kennedy, sold over one million copies in hardcover and reached #1 on the New York Times bestseller list. It was named People's Magazine's best book of 1989 and was adapted into the 1991 NBC television miniseries A Woman Named Jackie starring Roma Downey.

== Controversies ==
Although Heymann's books were commercial bestsellers, many were criticized by critics and historians; and even recalled due to factual disputes, inaccuracies and unsubstantiated claims. The first was Heymann's 1983 biography, Poor Little Rich Girl: The Life and Legend of Barbara Hutton, which claimed a Beverly Hills doctor, Dr. Edward A. Kantor, prescribed drugs to Barbara Hutton in 1943, when in fact, the doctor in question was only 14 years old at the time. The publisher recalled and destroyed the remaining 60,000 copies of the book. Heymann blamed his "six researchers" for the inaccuracies. Following the incident, Heymann said that he attempted suicide. He moved to Isreal and told reporters that he worked for Mossad, the Israeli spy agency.

Media attention to the Hutton book shed new light on Heymann's previous work. Pound historian Hugh Kenner publicly denounced Heymann's claim that he misappropriated an interview with Pound by an Italian interviewer, originally published in Venice, and represented it in his book as if he interviewed Pound himself. In 1984, Heymann gave an interview with The Washington Post in defense of his work: “There’s a great degree of difference in the amount of accuracy required between a book about Ezra Pound and a book about Barbara Hutton,” he said. “She’s not a historical personage — she was a social figure. What I wanted to do was a mise en scène of a life.”

NPR reported on Heyman's inaccuracies in his book, American Legacy: The Story of John and Caroline Kennedy, where several claims made by Heyman were found to be "apparent inventions". These fabrications were pointed out by a listener, Donna Morel, who said that she hopes her work will "prompt a recall of Heymann's defamatory books, and incite the publishing industry to establish fact checking standards." NPR standards and practices addressed the errors in a statement: "The problems include material in the excerpt referred to on this page, which is largely based on a purported conversation between Sen. Edward Kennedy and his niece, Caroline Kennedy. Heymann wrote that the Kennedys spoke during a flight from Paris to New York City on Nov. 20, 2002. But, it appears Sen. Kennedy could not have been on such a flight. He was on the Senate floor to vote the evening of Nov. 19, 2002. On Nov. 20, 2002, Sen. Kennedy was still in Washington, D.C., where he participated in the presentation of the 2002 Robert F. Kennedy Human Rights Award. It also isn't certain that the person who supposedly overheard the Kennedys' conversation — Thurston Gauleiter — existed. Research by attorney Donna Morel and by NPR turn up no evidence of him." Morel contacted several other media outlets, including The New Yorker, to point out their use of Heymann's books as factual research. The magazine used a quote found in Heymann's 2007 book, American Legacy: The Story of John and Caroline Kennedy, by Andy Warhol; which was published 20 years after the artist's death. The New Yorker retracted the quote after finding no evidence of the Warhol interview.

Investigative journalist, David Cay Johnston, wrote an expose for Newsweek on Heymann's 2014 biography, Joe DiMaggio and Marilyn Monroe: Legends in Love. Johnston, who first broke the story of inaccuracies in Heymann's first bestseller, once confronted him on his findings of "exaggeration, errors, and outright fabrication of sources and stories." Heymann responded that he "had no tape recordings, no paper trail of plane tickets and lodging receipts, and no recollection of how to find various locations where he had allegedly conducted research and interviews." Johnston further revealed in other books, interviews with sources long dead at the time Heymann began writing the book, sources who stated they never even spoke with Heymann, and other sources who said that Heymann wrote “dramatic lies.” Johnston wrote, "He also cited interviews with writer George Plimpton; Pierre Salinger, the Kennedy White House press secretary; and Jack Newfield. All three men were dead by 2005."

Elizabeth Taylor went to court in an attempt to block publication of Heymann's 1995 bestseller, Liz: An Intimate Biography. In his 2009 bestseller, Bobby and Jackie: A Love Story, Heymann asserted that the former first lady and her brother-in-law, Robert F. Kennedy, entered into a love affair shortly after the president's assassination.

== Personal life ==
Heymann had a daughter, Chloe Heymann, with his first wife, Jeanne Lunin. Their marriage ended in divorce. His second marriage to Rebecca Coughlan was annulled in 1996. He was survived by his third wife, Beatrice Schwartz, at the time of his death on May 9, 2012. He had a son, Paris Fineberg-Heymann, from an unknown relationship.

== List of works ==
- Ezra Pound: The Last Rower. A Political Profile (1976)
- American Aristocracy: The Lives and Times of James Russell, Amy, and Robert Lowell (1980)
- Poor Little Rich Girl: The Life and Legend of Barbara Hutton (1983) - film Poor Little Rich Girl: The Barbara Hutton Story
- A Woman Named Jackie: An Intimate Biography of Jacqueline Bouvier Kennedy Onassis (1989)
- Liz: An Intimate Biography of Elizabeth Taylor (1995)
- RFK: A Candid Biography of Robert F. Kennedy (1998)
- The Georgetown Ladies' Social Club: Power, Passion, and Politics in the Nations' Capital (2003)
- American Legacy: The Story of John & Caroline Kennedy (2007)
- Bobby and Jackie: A Love Story (2009)
- Joe and Marilyn: Legends in Love (2014)
