= A Woman Named Jackie =

- Based on: Biography by C. David Heymann
- Teleplay by: Roger O. Hirson
- Directed by: Larry Peerce
- Starring: Roma Downey; Stephen Collins; William Devane; Joss Ackland; Wendy Hughes; Ashley Crow; Andrew Buckley; Sarah Michelle Gellar; Bob Gunton
- Theme music composer: Lalo Schifrin
- Country of origin: United States
- Original language: English
- No. of episodes: 3

Production
- Producers: Lorin Bennett Salob; Lester Persky (exec. producer)
- Cinematography: Mike Fash
- Editors: Susan B. Browdy; Eric A. Sears
- Running time: 246 minutes

Original release
- Network: NBC
- Release: October 13 – October 15, 1991

A Woman Named Jackie is a 1991 American television miniseries chronicling the life of Jacqueline Kennedy Onassis. It was based on the 1989 book by C. David Heymann of the same title.

The miniseries was split into three parts:

- A Woman Named Jackie, Part 1: The Bouvier Years (October 13, 1991)
- A Woman Named Jackie, Part 2: The Kennedy Years (October 14, 1991)
- A Woman Named Jackie, Part 3: The Onassis Years (October 15, 1991)

== Cast ==
Actor	Role
Roma Downey	Jacqueline Kennedy Onassis
Stephen Collins	John F. Kennedy
William Devane	John Vernou "Black Jack" Bouvier III
Joss Ackland	Aristotle Onassis
Wendy Hughes	Janet Lee Bouvier
Ashley Crow	Lee Bouvier Radziwill
Andrew Buckley	John F. Kennedy Jr.
Nadia Dajani	Christina Onassis
Sarah Michelle Gellar	Teenage Jacqueline Bouvier
Josef Sommer	Joseph P. Kennedy Sr.
Eve Gordon	Marilyn Monroe
Brian Smiar	Lyndon B. Johnson

== Award and nominations ==
Year	Award	Category	Nominee(s)	Result	Ref.
1992	Primetime Emmy Awards	Outstanding Miniseries	Lester Persky, Lorin Bennett Salob, and Tomlinson Dean	Won	
1992	Primetime Emmy Awards	Outstanding Individual Achievement in Costume Design for a Miniseries or a Special	Shelley Komarov (for "Part I")	Nominated	
1992	Primetime Emmy Awards	Outstanding Sound Mixing for a Drama Miniseries or a Special	Walter Hoylman, Jerry Clemans, Robert L. Harman, and Allen L. Stone (for "Part III")	Nominated	

== See also ==
- Cultural depictions of Jacqueline Kennedy Onassis
- Cultural depictions of John F. Kennedy
- Assassination of John F. Kennedy in popular culture
