= Robert Fulghum =

American author and minister (born 1937)

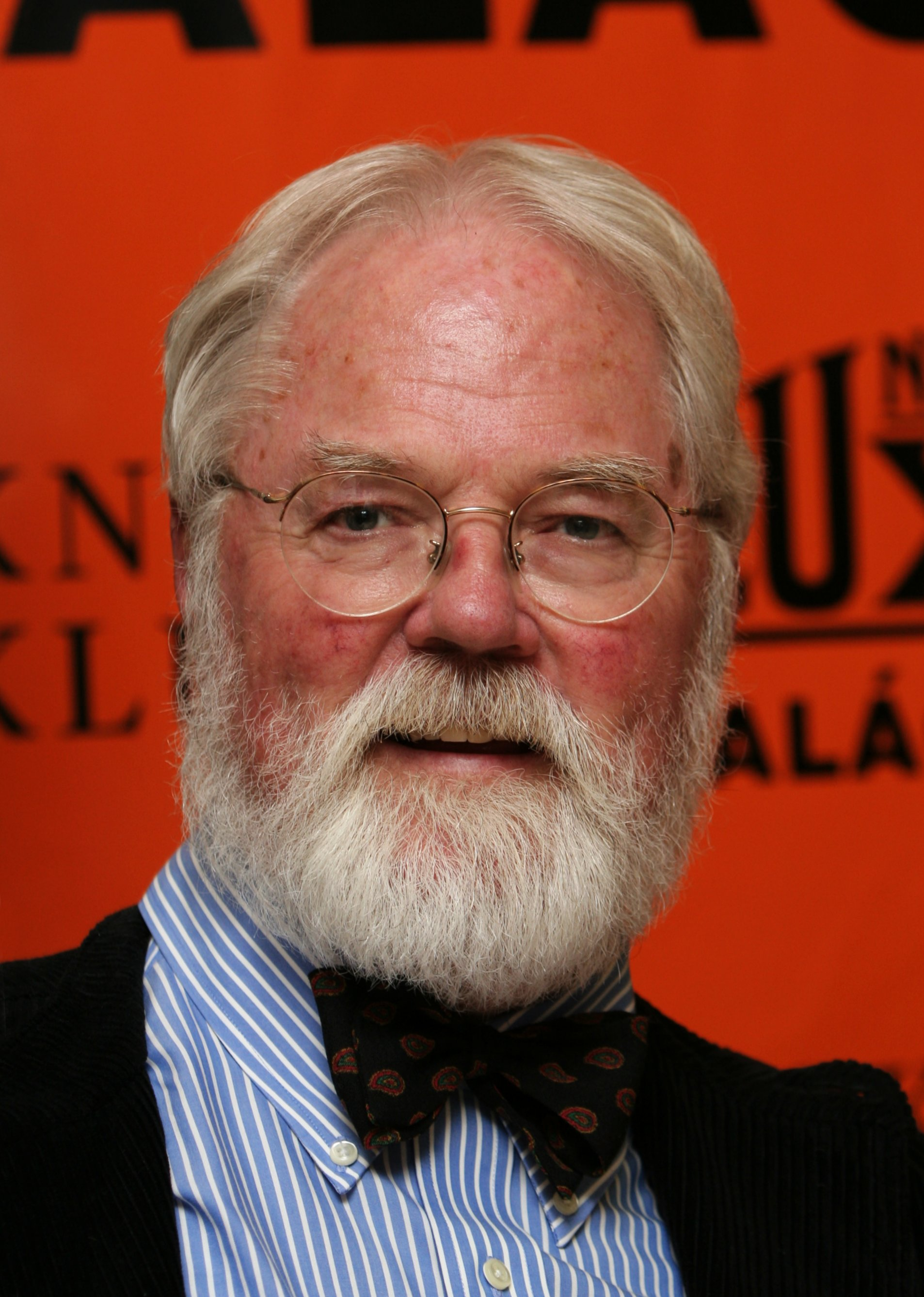
- Robert Fulghum in 2007
- Born: Robert Lee Fulghum; 1937 (age 88–89); Waco, Texas, U.S.
- Occupation: Writer
- Spouses: Marcia McClellan (1957–1973); Lynn Edwards (1975–2000); Willow Bader (2010–2016)
- Children: 3
- Writing career
- Genres: Essays, fiction
- Subjects: Spirituality, Philosophy
- Website: www.robertleefulghum.com

Robert Lee Fulghum (/ˈfʊldʒəm/; born 1937) is an American author and Unitarian Universalist minister.

== Early career ==
Robert Fulghum was born in 1937 . After growing up in Waco, Texas, he received his Bachelor of Arts at Baylor University in 1958. He received his Bachelor of Divinity at Starr King School for the Ministry in 1961 and was ordained as a Unitarian Universalist minister. Fulghum served the Bellingham Unitarian Fellowship in Bellingham, Washington from 1960 to 1964, and the Edmonds Unitarian Universalist Church in Edmonds, Washington, where he is Minister Emeritus.

== Writing ==
Fulghum came to prominence in the United States when his first collection of writings, All I Really Need to Know I Learned in Kindergarten (1988), stayed on The New York Times bestseller lists for nearly two years. The collection of essays is subtitled "Uncommon Thoughts on Common Things". A twenty-fifth anniversary edition of Kindergarten was published – updating and revising the original text, with the addition of twenty-five new stories.

There are more than 17 million copies of his books in print, published in 27 languages in 103 countries.

== Performances ==
Fulghum performed in two television adaptations of his work for PBS, and is a Grammy nominee for the spoken word award. He has been a speaker at numerous colleges, conventions, and public events across the United States and Europe. He has been a nationally syndicated newspaper columnist.

== Novels ==
Fulghum wrote a novel in three volumes. The first, Third Wish, was continued in Third Wish II, The Rest of the Story, Almost, and completed with the third volume, Third Wish, Granted. The novel was published in several languages, including English.

His next novel, If You Love Me Still, Will You Love Me Moving? Tales from the Century Ballroom, was inspired by Fulghum's love of dancing, especially tango, and was first published in Czech (as Drž mě pevně, miluj mě zlehka) in 2011.

Eventually, his books of essays were transformed into two stage productions. The first shares the same title as his first book, and was conceived and adapted by Ernest Zulia, with music and lyrics by David Caldwell. The play is based on all eight books, and is an optional musical. The second is entitled Uh-Oh, Here Comes Christmas. To date there have been more than 2,000 national and international productions of these plays.

== Personal life ==
Fulghum has been married three times. He has three children and six grandchildren. He lives in Moab, Utah, and on the Greek island of Crete.

== Works ==
His collections include:

- All I Really Need to Know I Learned in Kindergarten
- It Was on Fire When I Lay Down on It
- Uh-Oh: Some Observations from Both Sides of the Refrigerator Door
- Maybe (Maybe Not)
- From Beginning to End—The Rituals of Our Lives
- True Love
- Words I Wish I Wrote
- What on Earth Have I Done
- The Ongoing Adventures of Captain Kindergarten
- If You Love Me Still, Will You Love Me Moving?
- The Argentine Tango Chronicles
- Crisis In The Cheese Aisle (in Czech only)
- The Mender of Destinies (in Czech only)
