= Frank Winfield Woolworth =

American businessman (1852–1919)

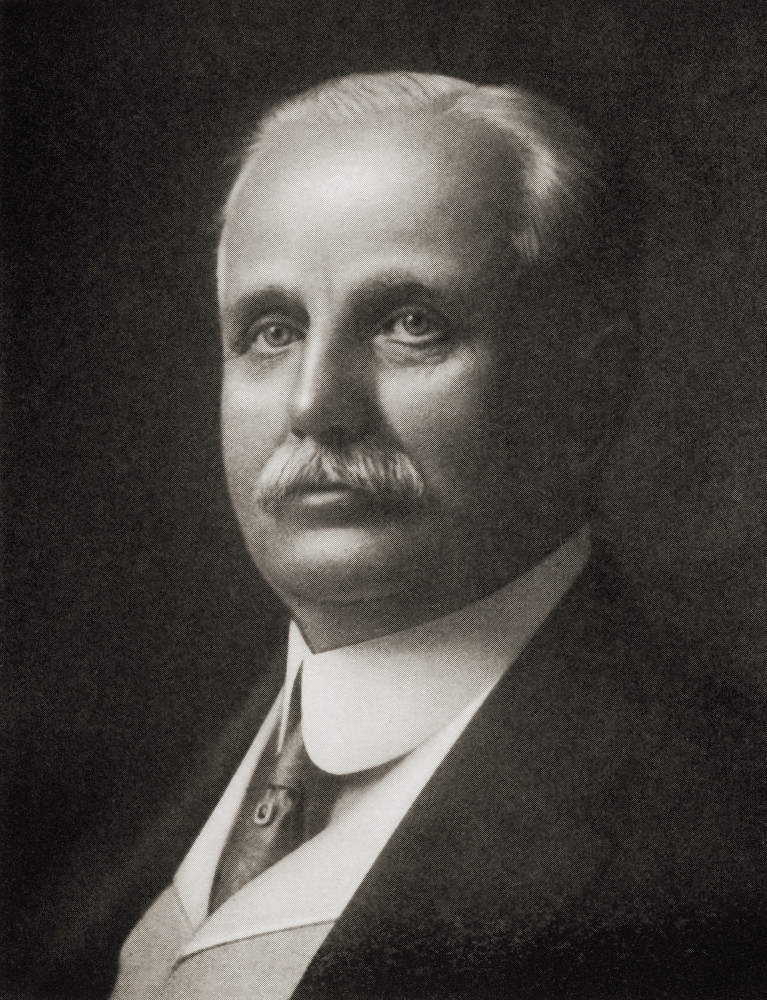
- Born: April 13, 1852; Rodman, New York, US
- Died: April 8, 1919 (aged 66); Glen Cove, New York, US
- Resting place: Woodlawn Cemetery
- Education: Watertown Commercial College
- Years active: 1873−1918
- Known for: Founded F. W. Woolworth Company (now Foot Locker)
- Political party: Republican
- Spouse: Jennie Creighton (m. 1876)
- Children: 3
- Relatives: Charles S. Woolworth (brother); Barbara Hutton (granddaughter); Lance Reventlow (great-grandson); Seymour H. Knox I (cousin)

Frank Winfield Woolworth (April 13, 1852 – April 8, 1919) was an American entrepreneur, the founder of F. W. Woolworth Company, and the operator of variety stores known as "Five-and-Dimes" (5- and 10-cent stores or dime stores) which featured a selection of low-priced merchandise. He pioneered the now-common practices of buying merchandise directly from manufacturers and fixing the selling prices on items, rather than haggling. He was also the first to use self-service display cases, so that customers could examine what they wanted to buy without the help of a sales clerk.

== Early life ==
Woolworth was born in Rodman, New York to John (1821–1907) and Fanny (née McBrier; 1832–1878) Woolworth; his brother was entrepreneur Charles Sumner Woolworth (1856–1947). His parents were devout Methodists and sympathetic to the Northern side during the Civil War, and they raised their sons in those beliefs. His paternal ancestors were English farmers who left England around 1665 settling in the Massachusetts Bay Colony area. Meanwhile, his mother's parents, the McBriers, were Scots-Irish from County Down, Ulster, who had come to the United States in 1827.

At age four, Woolworth told his parents that he would become a peddler like those who sometimes came calling. He and Charles would play "store", and Frank would set up merchandise to sell to his brother. Woolworth finished his schooling at age 16, yet he was unfit to begin working in any legitimate store with only basic knowledge and no experience. He applied to many shops in the area, every time being rejected. He attended a business college for two terms in Watertown, New York, with a loan from his mother.

== Career ==
In 1873, Woolworth worked as a stock boy in a general store called Augsbury & Moore's Drygoods in Watertown, and his experiences there served as the starting point to his own business venture and innovations. He was considered to be an inept salesman and was given jobs such as washing the windows, where he found a creative niche arranging the store's front display; his work was so impressive that his boss assigned him that role. Typical business practices of the day was that a few of each type of item be displayed on a counter if small and behind if not. Clerks were responsible for obtaining what the customer wanted and making the transaction. From exposure to this Woolworth developed the notion that goods should sell themselves, something which became increasingly prominent in his retail career.

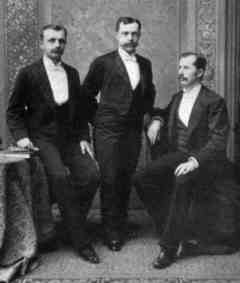
Frank and Charles Woolworth with Seymour H. Knox I

Under the employment of Moore & Smith, Woolworth had an opportunity to sell a large surplus of goods. He organized a store in Great Bend that opened on February 10, 1878, but sales were disappointing; the store failed in May. Accounts differ on the genesis of the five-and-dime concept. Gail Fenske suggests that Woolworth had heard of a "five-cent counter craze" while questioning his own sales ability at his first job. Jean Maddern Pitrone suggests that the idea was conceived after a travelling salesman told Woolworth of stores in Michigan with five-cent counters. Plunkett-Powell suggests that Woolworth overheard the concept during a discussion between William Moore and a young man who had opened his own cut-rate goods store.

Woolworth memorialized in an architectural detail of the Woolworth Building

Woolworth borrowed $300 (~$10,366 in 2025) and opened a five-cent store in Utica, New York, on February 22, 1879. It failed within weeks. He opened his second store in April 1879 in Lancaster, Pennsylvania, where he expanded the concept to include merchandise priced at ten cents. By 1889, Woolworth had twelve thriving stores and in ten years, from 1879 to 1889, his sales had increased by 240%. By 1900, Woolworth's chain had grown to fifty-nine stores, with sales of over $5 million (~$159 million in 2025). Woolworth's desire for control stretched further than just the bounds of his company. Wanting to implement his ideas on a much larger scale, F. W. adopted a policy of acquiring smaller chains of his competitors. This policy, combined with “the development of the five and ten cent idea, the exploitation of the idea through a chain, [and] the squeezing out of his middleman competitors for the purpose of controlling goods manufacturing and distribution” resulted in the dominance of the low-priced segment of the American retailing industry.

In 1911, the F. W. Woolworth Company was incorporated with 586 stores. In 1913, Woolworth built the Woolworth Building in New York City at a cost of $13.5 million (~$323 million in 2025) in cash. At the time, it was the tallest building in the world at 792 feet.

Woolworth often made unannounced visits to his stores, where he would shoplift items to test the staff's attentiveness. Managers or clerks who caught him doing so were sometimes rewarded with promotions.

== Personal life ==
On June 11, 1876, Woolworth married Jennie Creighton (1853–1924). They were the parents of Helena Maud Woolworth McCann (1878–1938), Jessie May Woolworth Donahue (1886–1971), and Edna Woolworth Hutton (1883–1917), who died from suffocation due to mastoiditis. Rumors have persisted that she died by suicide. She was the mother of Barbara Hutton. Frank and Jennie's marriage was a happy one and Jennie regretted the demands that financial success put on Frank's time with her. By 1916 she displayed the symptoms of advanced dementia.

== Death ==
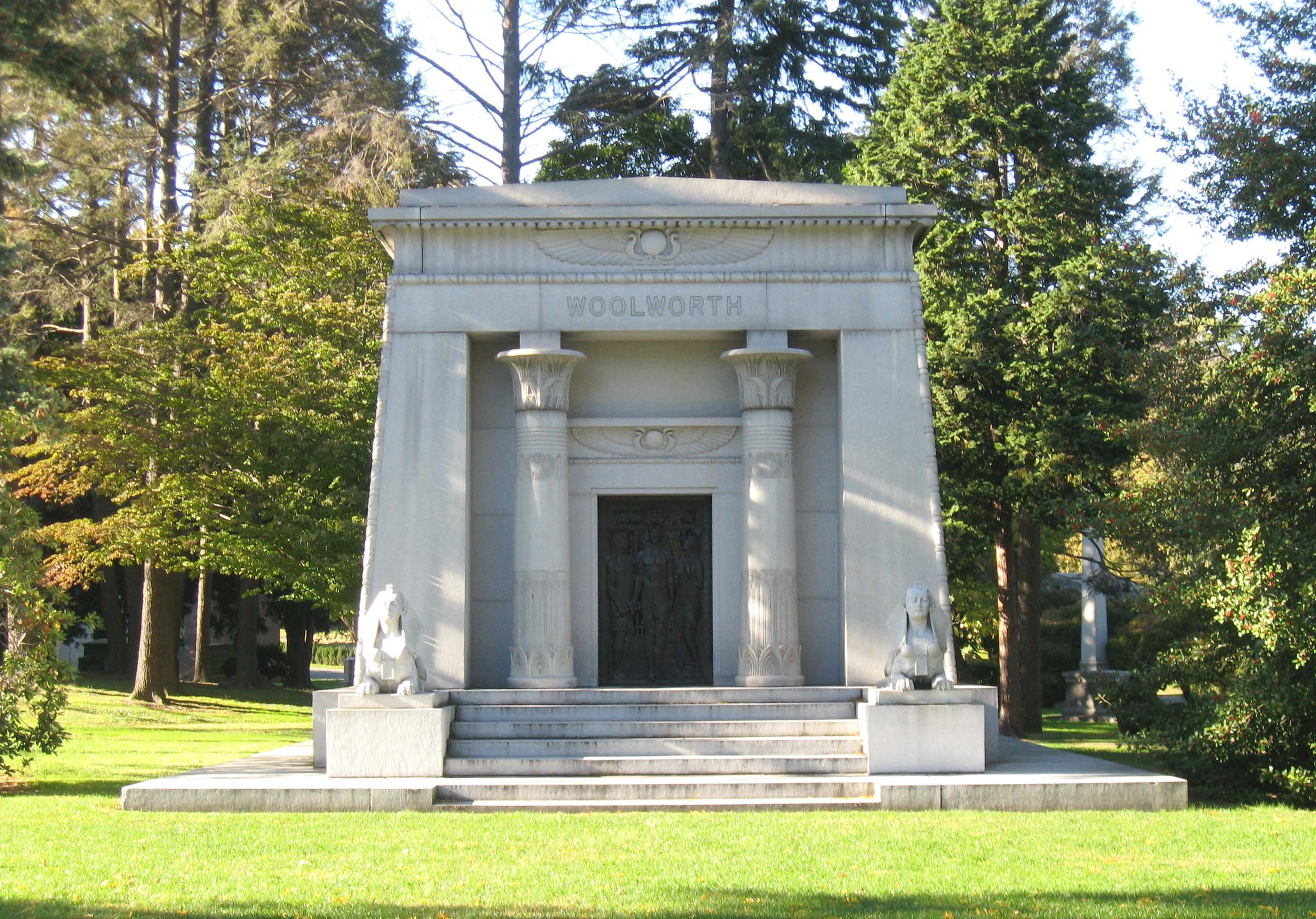
Woolworth's tomb in Woodlawn Cemetery, Bronx

Woolworth died of septic shock from an infected tooth on April 8, 1919, five days before his 67th birthday. At the time of his death, Woolworth was worth approximately $76.5 million or the equivalent of 1/1214th of the US GNP. His company owned more than 1,000 stores in the United States and other countries and was a $65 million ($804,328,215 in 2009 dollars) corporation. He died without signing his newest will, so his mentally handicapped wife received the entire estate under the provision of his older 1889 will. When she died in 1924, her estate was worth $57.5 million.

Woolworth is interred in the Woodlawn Cemetery in the Bronx, New York City.

== Legacy ==
- Bronze busts honoring Woolworth and seven other industry magnates stand outside between the Chicago River and the Merchandise Mart in downtown Chicago, Illinois.
- Woolworth was inducted into the Junior Achievement (US) Business Hall of Fame in 1995.
- A cemetery east of Watertown, New York, where he started his first store, is named for him.

=== Woolworth Company ===
In the 1960s, after Woolworth's death, the company began expanding into various individual specialty store concepts, including sportswear, which led to the development of the Foot Locker sporting goods store in 1974. For a while there was a chain of discount stores called Woolco. By 1997, the original chain he founded had been reduced to 400 stores, and other divisions of the company began to be more profitable than the original chain. The original chain went out of business on July 17, 1997, as the firm changed its name, initially to Venator, but in 2001 adopted its sporting goods brand, Foot Locker, Inc. In 2012 the New York Stock Exchange celebrated Woolworth's 100th anniversary. The UK stores, under separate ownership since 1982, continued operating under the Woolworth name after the US operation ceased and by the 2000s traded as Woolworths. The final UK stores ceased trading January 6, 2009. The UK Woolworths brand was bought by Shop Direct Group in the UK and operated online only but it ceased being operated as Woolworths in 2015. Woolworth stores continue to operate in Germany. Although both the Australian and the South African companies took their names from Woolworth's US and UK stores, they have no connection to the F.W. Woolworth Company.

== See also ==
- List of Woolworth buildings
