= Barbara Hutton =

American philanthropist and socialite (1912–1979)

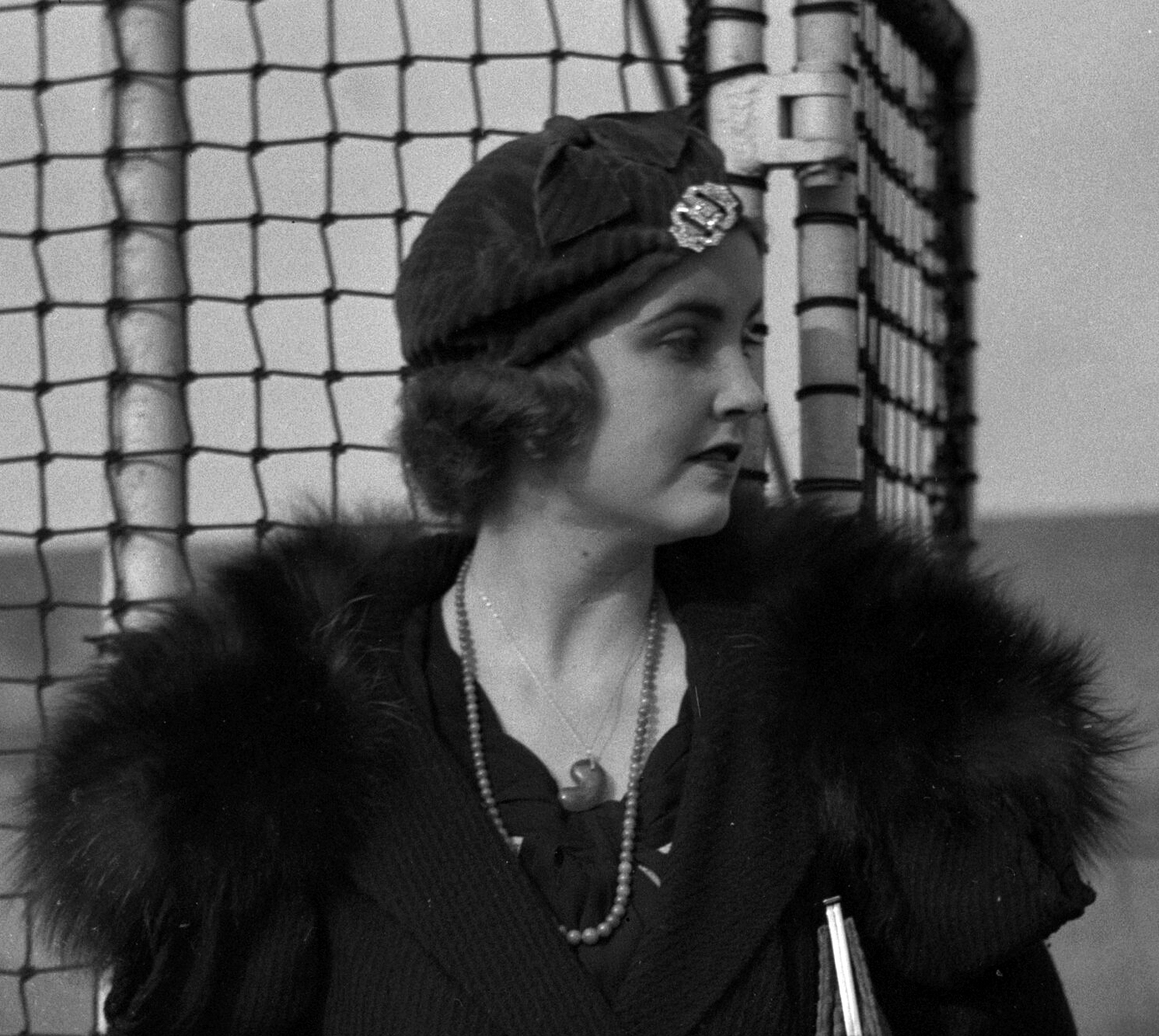
- Hutton in the 1930s
- Born: Barbara Woolworth Hutton; November 14, 1912; New York City, U.S.
- Died: May 11, 1979 (aged 66); Beverly Hills, California, U.S.
- Resting place: Woodlawn Cemetery, The Bronx, New York
- Occupations: Philanthropist, heiress
- Years active: 1933–1979
- Spouses: Alexis Mdivani (m. 1933; div. 1935); Count Curt Haugwitz-Hardenberg-Reventlow (m. 1935; div. 1938); Cary Grant (m. 1942; div. 1945); Prince Igor Troubetzkoy (m. 1947; div. 1951); Porfirio Rubirosa (m. 1953; div. 1954); Baron Gottfried von Cramm (m. 1955; div. 1959); Prince Pierre Doan (m. 1964; div. 1966)
- Children: Lance Reventlow
- Relatives: Frank Winfield Woolworth (maternal grandfather); Charles S. Woolworth (maternal granduncle); Edward Francis Hutton (paternal uncle); Dina Merrill (paternal first cousin)

Barbara Woolworth Hutton (November 14, 1912 – May 11, 1979) was an American debutante, socialite, heiress and philanthropist. She was dubbed the "Poor Little Rich Girl"— first when she was given a lavish and expensive debutante ball in 1930 amid the Great Depression and later due to a notoriously troubled private life.

Heiress to one-third of the estate of her grandfather, the retail tycoon Frank Winfield Woolworth, Barbara Hutton was one of the wealthiest women in the world. She endured a childhood marked by neglect by her father and the early loss, at age four, of her mother, who died from suffocation due to mastoiditis. Rumors have persisted that she committed suicide. This set the stage for a life of difficulty forming relationships. Married and divorced seven times, she acquired grand foreign titles but was maliciously treated and often exploited by several of her husbands. Publicly she was much envied for her possessions, her beauty and her apparent life of leisure; privately she remained deeply insecure, often taking refuge in drink, drugs and playboys.

Hutton was an inconsistent and insecure parent to her one child, exacerbated when the divorce from her second husband ended in a bitter custody battle, and she subsequently developed anorexia nervosa. Her son Lance Reventlow died in a 1972 plane crash, leaving Hutton devastated. A life of lavish spending, paired with exploitation by those entrusted to manage her estate, brought Hutton to the verge of bankruptcy before her death.

== Early life ==
Born in New York City, Barbara Hutton was the only child of Edna Woolworth (1883–1917), the daughter of Frank W. Woolworth, the founder of the successful Woolworth five-and-dime stores. Barbara's father was Franklyn Laws Hutton (1877–1940), a wealthy co-founder of E. F. Hutton & Company (owned by Franklyn's brother Edward Francis Hutton), a respected New York investment banking and stock brokerage firm. She was a niece by marriage of cereal heiress Marjorie Merriweather Post, who was for a time (1920–1935) married to E. F. Hutton; thus their daughter, actress-heiress Dina Merrill (born Nedenia Hutton), was a first cousin to Barbara Hutton. Merrill related on A&E's Biography that for a time Barbara lived with them following the death of her mother and abandonment by her father.

Edna Hutton reportedly died on May 2, 1917, age 33, from suffocation due to mastoiditis, but rumor persists that she committed suicide by poison in despair over her husband's philandering, especially as the coroner decided that no autopsy was necessary. Four-year-old Barbara discovered her mother's body; the trauma haunted her for the rest of her life. After her mother's death, she lived with various relatives, and was raised by a governess. Hutton attended Miss Hewitt's Classes, now The Hewitt School in New York's Lenox Hill neighborhood and Miss Porter's School for Girls in Farmington, Connecticut. She became an introverted child who had limited interaction with other children of her own age. Her closest friend and only confidante was her cousin Jimmy Donahue, the son of her mother's sister. Donahue inherited a portion of the Woolworth estate with Barbara and also grew up to have notorious, and public, drug, alcohol and relationship problems.

In 1924, Barbara Hutton's grandmother Jennie (Creighton) Woolworth died and bequeathed to her $26.1 million (~$388 million in 2025). Another $2.1 million in stock from Edna's inheritance was placed in a separate trust – both trusts were administered by Franklyn Hutton. By the time of her 21st birthday in 1933, Barbara Hutton's father had increased her inheritance to $42 million ($967 million in 2023) not including the additional $8 million from her mother's estate, making her one of the wealthiest women in the world.

In accordance with New York's high society traditions, Barbara Hutton was given a lavish débutante ball in 1930 on her 18th birthday, where guests from the Astor and Rockefeller families, amongst other elites, were entertained by stars such as Rudy Vallee and Maurice Chevalier. The ball cost $60,000, a fortune in the days of the Depression. Public criticism was so severe that she was sent on a tour of Europe to escape the onslaught of the press.

She lived in the family home at 4 East 80th Street on the Upper East Side.

== Marriages ==
Popular poet Ogden Nash took note of Hutton's public private life in the following light verse:

Said Aimee McPherson to Barbara Hutton,

"How do you get a marriage to button?"
"You'll have to ask some other person."

Said Barbara Hutton to Aimee McPherson

Barbara Hutton married:

1. 1933: Alexis Mdivani, a self-styled Georgian prince, divorced 1935
2. 1935: Count Curt Heinrich Eberhard Erdmann Georg Haugwitz-Hardenberg-Reventlow, divorced 1938
3. 1942: Cary Grant, divorced 1945
4. 1947: Prince Igor Troubetzkoy, divorced 1951
5. 1953: Porfirio Rubirosa, divorced 1954
6. 1955: Baron Gottfried Alexander Maximilian Walter Kurt von Cramm, divorced 1959
7. 1964: Pierre Raymond Doan, a Vietnamese chemist, divorced 1966

=== Alexis Mdivani ===
Her first husband, Alexis Mdivani, used her great wealth to his advantage. As a social climber, member of an exiled Georgian nobility with the rank of aznauri (untitled nobility), he and his siblings were part of the "Marrying Mdivanis" from Georgia who claimed to be "princes" after they fled Tbilisi in 1921 due to the Soviet invasion of Georgia. Alexis was already married to Louise Van Alen, a friend Barbara met at Bailey's Beach in Rhode Island and a member of the Astor family, when he met Barbara in Biarritz, France. Their meeting was engineered by Alexis' manipulative sister Isabelle Roussadana Mdivani (aka Roussie) who was always propelling her family into wealthy marriages even if a divorce was required. Roussie and Alexis devised a plan that would enable Alexis to divorce Louise, seduce Barbara, and force her into marriage all at once when Alexis, Louise, Barbara, Roussie, and others were visiting San Sebastian, Spain. Roussie timed Louise and other witnesses to visit a guest cottage while Alexis seduced Barbara. The group caught the couple, prompting Barbara to flee to Paris to avoid facing the scandal, but Roussie threatened Barbara with negative publicity if she did not marry her brother. Alexis and Barbara were married on June 22, 1933, in the Russian Orthodox Church in Paris, France. Barbara's father provided a $1 million dowry. After spending millions of Barbara's inheritance on a home, polo ponies, clothes and men's jewelry, Alexis and Barbara divorced in March 1935.

=== Kurt Haugwitz-Hardenberg-Reventlow ===
Count Kurt von Haugwitz-Hardenberg-Reventlow, with whom she had her only child, a son named Lance, was her second husband. Reventlow dominated her through verbal and physical abuse, which escalated to a savage beating that left her hospitalized and put him in jail. He also persuaded her to give up her American citizenship, and to take his native Danish citizenship for tax purposes, which she did in December 1937 in a New York federal court. At this point she lapsed into drug abuse. Hutton then developed anorexia, which would plague her for the rest of her life and would leave her unable to have further children. Lance Reventlow, the son, became a race car driver and builder of his own well-respected sports car, the Scarab, in the golden age of American sports car racing.

Hutton's divorce from Reventlow gave her custody of their son after a bitter court dispute. As her father had done, she left the raising of her child to a governess and private boarding schools.

In 1938, Hutton had a brief affair with Howard Hughes in London at the Savoy Hotel, where Hughes spent several afternoons with Hutton. Hughes, at the time, was engaged to Katharine Hepburn and had come to London to meet with government officials and arrange permission to overfly Europe as part of a plan to circumnavigate the globe by air. Hutton later recalled that "he felt he must absolutely be in control of a situation."

Hughes had met Hepburn on the set of one of Cary Grant's movies, while visiting with Grant. Howard Hughes and Cary Grant were close, long-time friends.

=== Cary Grant ===
In 1937, Hutton and her then husband moved into their newly built home, Winfield House, in London's Regent's Park. They had purchased the property from the Crown Estate Commission in 1936 and were granted permission to build a new home on the land. As World War II threatened in 1939, Hutton moved to California. She supported the commandeering of Winfield House by the British Forces and its use for various wartime services during the war.

Hutton was active during the war, giving money to assist the Free French Forces and donating her yacht to the Royal Navy. Using her high-profile image to sell war bonds, she received positive publicity after being derided by the press as a result of her marriage scandals. In Hollywood, she met Cary Grant, one of the biggest movie stars of the day, and later married him on July 8, 1942. According to the U.S. Embassy website, following their marriage, Grant was in London for the war effort and visited Winfield House. Hearing that the U.S. broadcaster Edward R. Murrow criticized Hutton for abandoning her London home, Grant suggested that Murrow visit the house before leveling unfounded criticism. Following the war, Hutton gifted Winfield House to the U.S. Government to be used as the official residence for the US Ambassador.

The press dubbed Hutton and Grant, "Cash and Cary", though Grant did not need her money nor did he need to benefit from her name, and he appeared to genuinely care for Hutton. Nevertheless, this marriage also failed. Grant did not seek or receive any money from Hutton in their divorce settlement.

=== Igor Troubetzkoy ===
Hutton left California and moved to Paris, France, before acquiring a palace in Tangier. Hutton then began dating Igor Troubetzkoy, an expatriate Russian prince of very limited means but world renown. In the spring of 1948 in Zürich, Switzerland, she married him. That year, he was the driver of the first Ferrari ever to compete in Grand Prix motor racing when he raced in the Monaco Grand Prix, and later won the Targa Florio. He ultimately filed for divorce. Hutton's subsequent attempted suicide made headlines around the world. Labeled by the press as the "Poor Little Rich Girl", her life made great copy and the media exploited her for consumption by a fascinated public.

=== Porfirio Rubirosa ===
Her next marriage, lasting 53 days (December 30, 1953 – February 20, 1954), was to Dominican diplomat Porfirio Rubirosa, a notorious international playboy who meanwhile continued his affair with actress Zsa Zsa Gabor. In order to marry Rubirosa, Hutton was granted Dominican citizenship.

In a scathing review of the marriage ceremony in the Milwaukee Sentinel, Phyllis Battelle coined the oft-quoted phrase: "The bride, for her fifth wedding, wore black and carried a scotch-and-soda."

Hutton then spent time with Americans James Douglas and Philip Van Rensselaer. Her lavish spending continued; already the owner of several mansions around the world, in 1959 she built a luxurious Japanese-style palace on a 30-acre (120,000 m^{2}) estate in Cuernavaca, Mexico.

=== Gottfried von Cramm ===
Her next husband was an old friend, German tennis star Baron Gottfried von Cramm. This marriage also ended in divorce. He later died in an automobile crash near Cairo, Egypt, in 1976.

=== Raymond Doan ===
In Tangier, Hutton met her seventh husband, Prince Pierre Raymond Doan Vinh na Champassak. This marriage, too, was short-lived. Doan's title was bought for him by Hutton from the former royal family of the Kingdom of Champasak (roughly located in modern Laos).

=== Other relationships ===
Hutton lived with Frederick McEvoy, purchasing a chalet at a ski resort in Franconia, New Hampshire, after her marriage to actor Cary Grant. The couple never married and remained friends until McEvoy's death in 1951. Hutton frequently appeared intoxicated in public and was notorious throughout her life for lavish spending. She was known to make gifts to total strangers.

== Art and jewelry ==
Over the years, apart from an important inheritance which included Old Master paintings and important sculptures, she also personally acquired a magnificent collection of her own which included a spectrum of arts, porcelain, and valuable jewelry, including elaborate historic pieces that had once belonged to Marie Antoinette and Empress Eugénie of France and important pieces by Fabergé and Cartier. Among her pieces of jewelry was the 40-carat (8.0 g) Pasha Diamond, which she purchased as an unusual octagonal brilliant-cut but had recut into a round brilliant, bringing it down to 36 carats (7.2 g).

== Final years and death ==
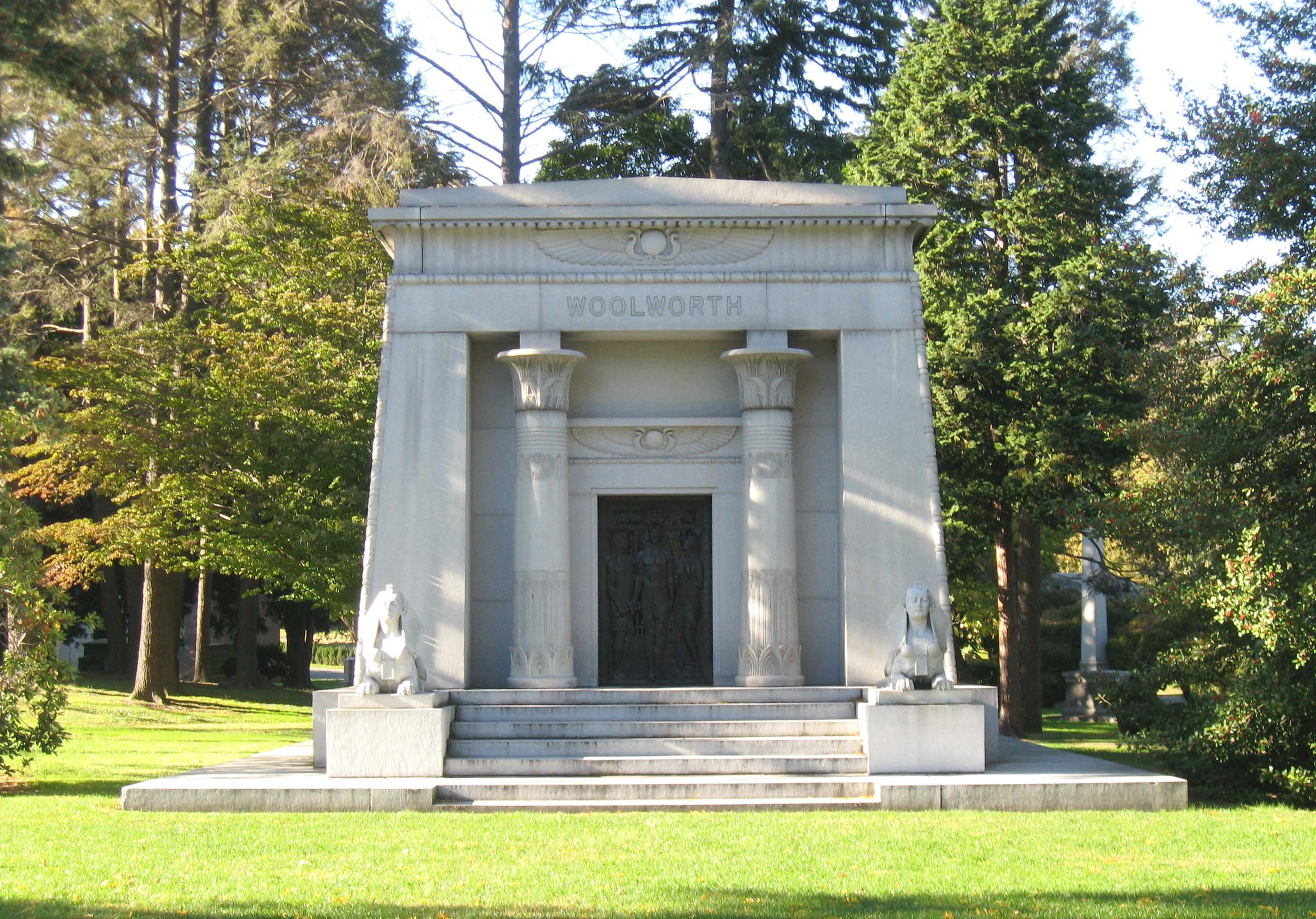
Woolworth family mausoleum

The death of her only son Lance Reventlow in a plane crash in 1972 sent Hutton into a state of despair. By this time, her fortune had diminished, allegedly due in part to questionable deals by her longtime lawyer, Graham Mattison. She liquidated assets to raise funds to live, yet continued to spend money on strangers willing to pay attention to her. She spent her final years in Los Angeles, living at the Beverly Wilshire Hotel, where she died from a heart attack in May 1979, aged 66. One biographer wrote that, at her death, $3,500 was all that remained of her fortune, but some close to her said that was not the case. She was interred in the Woolworth family mausoleum at Woodlawn Cemetery in The Bronx, New York.

== In popular culture ==
- Poor Little Rich Girl: The Barbara Hutton Story (1987), based on David Heymann's biography, a television miniseries starring Farrah Fawcett as Barbara Hutton with Fairuza Balk portraying her at age 12 and Matilda Johansson at age 5. James Read portrays Cary Grant.
- Phantom Thread (2018), an haute couture dressmaker (played by Daniel Day-Lewis) in 1950s London struggles with inspiration and relationships. The character Barbara Rose (played by Harriet Sansom Harris) is inspired by Barbara Hutton around the time of her marriage with Rubirosa.
- Rubirosa (2018), a Mexican web television series co-starring Gabriela de la Garza as Barbara Hutton.
- As The Money Burns (2020–present), a history podcast reconstructing the Great Depression through the lives of heirs and heiresses. As a primary heiress, Barbara appears in multiple episodes beginning with the second episode "Welcome to Newport, Part 1" which covers the summer before the 1929 Wall Street Crash. Other episodes include her debutante ball, her bow at Buckingham Palace, and other key events and moments in her life.

== See also ==
- Woolworths
- Lady Hutton (yacht)
- List of people from Morelos
