= All I Really Need to Know I Learned in Kindergarten =

Book by Robert Fulghum

All I Really Need To Know I Learned in Kindergarten
- Author: Robert Fulghum
- Publisher: Ivy Books
- Publication date: Oct 30, 1989
- Pages: 186
- ISBN: 978-0-8041-0526-2

All I Really Need To Know I Learned in Kindergarten is a book of short essays by American minister and author Robert Fulghum. It was first published in 1986.

The title of the book is taken from the first essay in the volume, in which Fulghum lists lessons normally learned in American kindergarten classrooms and explains how the world would be improved if adults adhered to the same basic rules as children, i.e. sharing, being kind to one another, cleaning up after themselves, and living "a balanced life" of work, play, and learning.

The book contains fifty short essays, ranging in length from approximately 200 to 1,000 words, which are ruminations on topics ranging from surprises, holidays, childhood, death, and the lives of interesting people including Mother Teresa. In his introduction, Fulghum describes these as having been "written over many years and addressed to friends, family, a religious community, and myself, with no thought of publication in book form."

== Reception ==
Although widely published, quoted and cited in other essays, Fulghum's essays (especially the title piece) have also been criticized as trite and saccharine. Fulghum addresses this in an essay in his subsequent book, It Was on Fire When I Lay Down on It wherein he mentions "grown-up" subjects such as sexuality.

== Musical adaptation ==
Fulghum worked with Ernie Zulia (director) and David Caldwell (composer and music director) to create a musical based on Kindergarten, bearing the same title. It was premiered at Mill Mountain Theatre (Roanoke, VA) in June 1992, and was also presented by the Phoenix Theatre (Indianapolis) in 1996. The same personnel also created another musical production of the third book in his trilogy, Uh Oh, called Uh Oh, Here Comes Christmas, which also premiered at Mill Mountain Theater, in December 1998.

== Cultural influence ==
Over nearly two decades, the title essay, "All I Really Need To Know I Learned in Kindergarten", has spawned countless parodies involving television shows, movies, books, and other phenomena. The standard format mirrors Fulghum's own work, starting with "All I Really Need To Know I Learned From [name]", followed by a list of quotes and/or in-jokes from the subject being parodied.

Bart Simpson's chalkboard gag in "You Only Move Twice" is "I did not learn everything I need to know in kindergarten." Fulghum was a member of the Rock Bottom Remainders, a rock and roll music group of authors whose members also included Simpsons co-creator Matt Groening, and author Stephen King.
