= List of The New York Times number-one books of 1986 =

The American daily newspaper The New York Times publishes multiple weekly lists ranking the best-selling books in the United States.

== Fiction ==
The following list ranks the number-one best-selling fiction books, in the hardcover fiction category.

Date	Book	Author
January 5	The Mammoth Hunters	Jean M. Auel
January 12	The Mammoth Hunters	Jean M. Auel
January 19	The Mammoth Hunters	Jean M. Auel
January 26	The Mammoth Hunters	Jean M. Auel
February 2	The Mammoth Hunters	Jean M. Auel
February 9	The Mammoth Hunters	Jean M. Auel
February 16	Lie Down with Lions	Ken Follett
February 23	Lie Down with Lions	Ken Follett
March 2	Lake Wobegon Days	Garrison Keillor
March 9	The Bourne Supremacy	Robert Ludlum
March 16	The Bourne Supremacy	Robert Ludlum
March 23	The Bourne Supremacy	Robert Ludlum
March 30	The Bourne Supremacy	Robert Ludlum
April 6	The Bourne Supremacy	Robert Ludlum
April 13	The Bourne Supremacy	Robert Ludlum
April 20	The Bourne Supremacy	Robert Ludlum
April 27	The Bourne Supremacy	Robert Ludlum
May 4	A Perfect Spy	John le Carré
May 11	A Perfect Spy	John le Carré
May 18	A Perfect Spy	John le Carré
May 25	I'll Take Manhattan	Judith Krantz
June 1	A Perfect Spy	John le Carré
June 8	I'll Take Manhattan	Judith Krantz
June 15	A Perfect Spy	John le Carré
June 22	Last of the Breed	Louis L'Amour
June 29	Last of the Breed	Louis L'Amour
July 6	Last of the Breed	Louis L'Amour
July 13	Last of the Breed	Louis L'Amour
July 20	Wanderlust	Danielle Steel
July 27	Wanderlust	Danielle Steel
August 3	Wanderlust	Danielle Steel
August 10	Wanderlust	Danielle Steel
August 17	Red Storm Rising	Tom Clancy
August 24	Red Storm Rising	Tom Clancy
August 31	Red Storm Rising	Tom Clancy
September 7	Red Storm Rising	Tom Clancy
September 14	It	Stephen King
September 21	It	Stephen King
September 28	It	Stephen King
October 5	It	Stephen King
October 12	It	Stephen King
October 19	It	Stephen King
October 26	It	Stephen King
November 2	It	Stephen King
November 9	It	Stephen King
November 16	It	Stephen King
November 23	Whirlwind	James Clavell
November 30	Whirlwind	James Clavell
December 7	Whirlwind	James Clavell
December 14	Whirlwind	James Clavell
December 21	It	Stephen King
December 28	It	Stephen King

== Nonfiction ==
The following list ranks the number-one best-selling nonfiction books, in the hardcover nonfiction category.

Date	Book	Author
January 5	Iacocca: An Autobiography	Lee Iacocca with William Novak
January 12	Yeager: An Autobiography	Chuck Yeager and Leo Janos
January 19	Iacocca: An Autobiography	Lee Iacocca with William Novak
January 26	Yeager: An Autobiography	Chuck Yeager and Leo Janos
February 2	Yeager: An Autobiography	Chuck Yeager and Leo Janos
February 9	Iacocca: An Autobiography	Lee Iacocca with William Novak
February 16	Iacocca: An Autobiography	Lee Iacocca with William Novak
February 23	Bus 9 to Paradise	Leo Buscaglia
March 2	Bus 9 to Paradise	Leo Buscaglia
March 9	Bus 9 to Paradise	Leo Buscaglia
March 16	Bus 9 to Paradise	Leo Buscaglia
March 23	You're Only Old Once!	Dr. Seuss
March 30	You're Only Old Once!	Dr. Seuss
April 6	You're Only Old Once!	Dr. Seuss
April 13	You're Only Old Once!	Dr. Seuss
April 20	You're Only Old Once!	Dr. Seuss
April 27	You're Only Old Once!	Dr. Seuss
May 4	You're Only Old Once!	Dr. Seuss
May 11	The Triumph of Politics	David Stockman
May 18	The Triumph of Politics	David Stockman
May 25	Fatherhood	Bill Cosby
June 1	Fatherhood	Bill Cosby
June 8	Fatherhood	Bill Cosby
June 15	Fatherhood	Bill Cosby
June 22	Fatherhood	Bill Cosby
June 29	Fatherhood	Bill Cosby
July 6	Fatherhood	Bill Cosby
July 13	Fatherhood	Bill Cosby
July 20	Fatherhood	Bill Cosby
July 27	Fatherhood	Bill Cosby
August 3	Fatherhood	Bill Cosby
August 10	Fatherhood	Bill Cosby
August 17	Fatherhood	Bill Cosby
August 24	Fatherhood	Bill Cosby
August 31	Fatherhood	Bill Cosby
September 7	Fatherhood	Bill Cosby
September 14	Fatherhood	Bill Cosby
September 21	Fatherhood	Bill Cosby
September 28	Fatherhood	Bill Cosby
October 5	Fatherhood	Bill Cosby
October 12	His Way	Kitty Kelley
October 19	His Way	Kitty Kelley
October 26	His Way	Kitty Kelley
November 2	His Way	Kitty Kelley
November 9	His Way	Kitty Kelley
November 16	His Way	Kitty Kelley
November 23	His Way	Kitty Kelley
November 30	A Day in the Life of America	David Elliot Cohen and Rick Smolan
December 7	A Day in the Life of America	David Elliot Cohen and Rick Smolan
December 14	A Day in the Life of America	David Elliot Cohen and Rick Smolan
December 21	Fatherhood	Bill Cosby
December 28	Fatherhood	Bill Cosby

== See also ==
- Publishers Weekly list of bestselling novels in the United States in the 1980s
