= Scruples (miniseries) =

Television series

- Scruples mini-series title card
- Genre: Drama
- Based on: Scruples by Judith Krantz
- Teleplay by: James Lee
- Directed by: Alan J. Levi
- Starring: Lindsay Wagner; Barry Bostwick; Marie-France Pisier; Efrem Zimbalist Jr. Kim Cattrall; Gene Tierney; Nick Mancuso; Gavin MacLeod
- Composer: Charles Bernstein
- Country of origin: United States
- Original language: English
- No. of episodes: 3 x 90 minutes

Production
- Executive producer: Paul R. Picard
- Producer: Leonard B. Kaufman
- Cinematography: Joseph F. Biroc
- Editors: Howard Deane; Erwin Dumbrille
- Production companies: Lou Step Productions; Warner Bros. Television

Original release
- Network: CBS
- Release: February 25 – February 28, 1980

Scruples is a 1980 American television miniseries based on the 1978 novel by Judith Krantz. It was produced by Warner Bros. Television and starred Lindsay Wagner. Scruples included the final screen appearance of Gene Tierney.

== Plot ==
Wilhelmina Hunnewell Winthrop is a plain young woman, and a "poor relative" of the Winthrops, a wealthy Boston family. After she graduates from high school, she is given a sum of money by an aunt and goes to live in Paris with family friends. There, she undergoes a transformation of both body and soul, first losing weight, then gaining Parisian style under the guidance of Liliane, the elegant French woman who is her hostess. She is also introduced to Edouard, Liliane's nephew, who gives her the nickname "Billy". It is her first intimate love affair, but when the aristocratic but impecunious Edouard discovers that Billy is just a poor relative of the Winthrop family, he shows his true colors and ends the relationship.

Billy returns to America and moves to New York City, where she is hired by Ikehorn Enterprises as a secretary. During a business meeting in California, she becomes romantically involved with the wealthy CEO, Ellis Ikehorn, who is far older than she. The couple then marry and the next several years are happy ones, as Billy and Ellis live a glamorous life. However, Ellis later suffers a stroke, and Billy moves them from Manhattan to the exclusive Bel Air neighborhood of Los Angeles for the better climate.

Billy hires a male nurse, Jake Cassidy, to look after Ellis, but Billy lives as a recluse in their enormous house and looks aimlessly for some purpose in her life, eventually developing a compulsion to shop in Beverly Hills. Ellis advises her to find something to do at which she is good, perhaps in fashion. Sometime later, Ellis dies and leaves Billy an enormous fortune. Jake, motivated by debt, then tries to blackmail Billy, but fails.

Heeding Ellis's advice, Billy decides to open a luxury boutique on Rodeo Drive called "Scruples". She hires a young French designer, Valentine O'Neil, to design couture clothing for the customers, and also hires Valentine's close friend, Spider Elliot, a former fashion photographer, who becomes the creative director of the store. Valentine and Spider have a history of rocky relationships of their own, though, with Valentine first getting herself involved with her closeted gay boss and later with Billy's married attorney Josh Hillman, and Spider's involvement with troubled model-turned-actress, Melanie Adams.

With Scruples a success, Billy then marries Vito Orsini, a film director. As she is also part owner of a Hollywood studio (assets left to her by Ellis), she helps Vito to finance his new film, Mirrors. Studio boss Curt Arvey is not happy with Billy's interference in his studio, and intends to sabotage any chance of the film's success. During this scenario, Billy also becomes friends with Dolly Moon, a flamboyant supporting actress in Vito's film.

A power struggle later ensues when Curt Arvey attempts to confiscate Vito's film before it can be finished, and keeps it locked in the studio's vaults. Billy and Spider manage to steal the film back, so Vito can finish editing the film at home. Meanwhile, Billy is once again menaced by Jake Cassidy, who breaks into her home and attempts to rape her, but he is apprehended by the police just in time. The story ends as Vito's film wins an Academy Award for Best Picture, and Billy announces that she is pregnant with their first child. At the same time, Spider and Valentine realize that their long friendship has turned into love.

== Cast ==
Actor	Role
Starring
Lindsay Wagner	Billy Ikehorn
Barry Bostwick	Spider Elliott
Marie-France Pisier	Valentine O'Neill
Also starring
Efrem Zimbalist, Jr.	Ellis Ikehorn
Connie Stevens	Maggie McGregor
Nick Mancuso	Vito Orsini
Robert Reed	Josh Hilman
Gene Tierney	Harriet Toppingham
Louise Latham	Mary Ann Evans
Genevieve	Lilianne de Vertdulac
Michael Callan	Alan Wilton
Gary Graham	Jake Cassidy
Sarah Marshall	Susan Arvey
Milton Selzer	Sid Amos
Paul Carr	Pat O'Byrnne
John Hancock	Lieutenant Tony Bakersmith
Anna Lee	Aunt Wilhelmina
Lelia Goldoni	Joanne Hillman
George Gaynes	John Prince
Guest stars
Kim Cattrall	Melanie Adams
Francois-Marie Benard	Edouard
Gavin MacLeod	Curt Arvey
Murphy Cross	Dolly Moon

== History ==
Based on the 1978 novel by Judith Krantz, Scruples was a ratings success for the CBS network, capitalizing on the public's new-found taste for glossy television melodramas that would dominate the ratings for much of the 1980s, and for the miniseries format that had become popular with productions such as Rich Man, Poor Man (1976) and Roots (1977). It launched a cycle of similarly opulent and melodramatic, female-centric miniseries productions based on bestselling novels over the next decade, including Bare Essence (1982), A Woman of Substance (1984), Lace (1984), Hollywood Wives (1985), Sins (1986), Crossings (1986), If Tomorrow Comes (1986), Roses Are for The Rich (1987), and Lucky Chances (1990). Several other popular miniseries of this era were adapted from other Krantz novels, including Mistral's Daughter (1984), I'll Take Manhattan (1987), and Till We Meet Again (1989).

Due to the success of the Scruples miniseries, a pilot for a potential weekly series (featuring a different cast including Shelley Smith and Dirk Benedict) was produced in 1981, but was unsuccessful. In 2012, another pilot for a potential weekly series was made, starring Claire Forlani and Chad Michael Murray, but this, too, was unsuccessful.

Lindsay Wagner went on to appear in another Judith Krantz miniseries adaptation, Princess Daisy, in 1983. Barry Bostwick also appeared in the TV adaptations of Krantz's novels I'll Take Manhattan in 1987 and Till We Meet Again in 1989.

== Home media ==
Scruples was released on a double-cassette home video in the mid-1990s by Warner Home Video.

The film was released on DVD in 2008, but only in Australia (region 4). In January 2010, Warner Bros. made the miniseries available on DVD in the U.S. as a three-disc set via the Warner Archive Collection, an online service in which customers could purchase "made-to-order" DVDs from the Warner Bros. library.
