= Family album =

Family album may refer to:

- A photo album containing family photographs

== Literature ==
- Family Album (novel), a 1985 novel by Danielle Steel
- Family Album (play) a 1935 short play by Noël Coward

== Music ==
- Family Album (David Allan Coe album) or the title song, 1978
- Family Album (Faun Fables album), 2004
- Family Album (Stoneground album), 1971
- The Family Album, an album by Rick Wakeman, 1987
- Family Album, an album by Lia Ices, 2021
- Steve Ashley's Family Album, a 1983 album by Steve Ashley

== Film and television ==
- Family Album (1993 TV series), an American sitcom
- Family Album (2023 film), an Uruguayan-Argentine comedy film by Guillermo Rocamora
- Family Album (2024 Argentine film), a documentary film by Laura Casabé
- Family Album (2024 Peruvian film), a Peruvian-Colombian drama film by Joel Calero
- Family Album (miniseries), a 1994 American miniseries based on the Danielle Steel novel
- "Family Album" (The Colbys), an episode
