= List of The New York Times number-one books of 1980 =

The American daily newspaper The New York Times publishes multiple weekly lists ranking the best-selling books in the United States.

== Fiction ==
The following list ranks the number-one best-selling fiction books, in the hardcover fiction category.

Date	Book	Author
January 6	Jailbird	Kurt Vonnegut
January 13	Jailbird	Kurt Vonnegut
January 20	Smiley's People	John le Carré
January 27	Smiley's People	John le Carré
February 3	Smiley's People	John le Carré
February 10	Smiley's People	John le Carré
February 17	Princess Daisy	Judith Krantz
February 24	Princess Daisy	Judith Krantz
March 2	Princess Daisy	Judith Krantz
March 9	Princess Daisy	Judith Krantz
March 16	Princess Daisy	Judith Krantz
March 23	The Bourne Identity	Robert Ludlum
March 30	The Bourne Identity	Robert Ludlum
April 6	The Bourne Identity	Robert Ludlum
April 13	The Bourne Identity	Robert Ludlum
April 20	The Bourne Identity	Robert Ludlum
April 27	The Bourne Identity	Robert Ludlum
May 4	The Bourne Identity	Robert Ludlum
May 11	The Bourne Identity	Robert Ludlum
May 18	The Bourne Identity	Robert Ludlum
May 25	The Bourne Identity	Robert Ludlum
June 1	The Bourne Identity	Robert Ludlum
June 8	The Bourne Identity	Robert Ludlum
June 15	The Bourne Identity	Robert Ludlum
June 22	The Bourne Identity	Robert Ludlum
June 29	The Bourne Identity	Robert Ludlum
July 6	The Bourne Identity	Robert Ludlum
July 13	Rage of Angels	Sidney Sheldon
July 20	Rage of Angels	Sidney Sheldon
July 27	Rage of Angels	Sidney Sheldon
August 3	Rage of Angels	Sidney Sheldon
August 10	Rage of Angels	Sidney Sheldon
August 17	Rage of Angels	Sidney Sheldon
August 24	Rage of Angels	Sidney Sheldon
August 31	Rage of Angels	Sidney Sheldon
September 7	Rage of Angels	Sidney Sheldon
September 14	Rage of Angels	Sidney Sheldon
September 21	Rage of Angels	Sidney Sheldon
September 28	Firestarter	Stephen King
October 5	Firestarter	Stephen King
October 12	Firestarter	Stephen King
October 19	The Key to Rebecca	Ken Follett
October 26	The Key to Rebecca	Ken Follett
November 2	The Covenant	James Michener
November 9	The Covenant	James Michener
November 16	The Covenant	James Michener
November 23	The Covenant	James Michener
November 30	The Covenant	James Michener
December 7	The Covenant	James Michener
December 14	The Covenant	James Michener
December 21	The Covenant	James Michener
December 28	The Covenant	James Michener

== Nonfiction ==
The following list ranks the number-one best-selling nonfiction books, in the hardcover nonfiction category.

Date	Book	Author
January 6	Aunt Erma's Cope Book	Erma Bombeck
January 13	Aunt Erma's Cope Book	Erma Bombeck
January 20	Aunt Erma's Cope Book	Erma Bombeck
January 27	The Brethren	Bob Woodward and Scott Armstrong
February 3	The Brethren	Bob Woodward and Scott Armstrong
February 10	The Brethren	Bob Woodward and Scott Armstrong
February 17	The Brethren	Bob Woodward and Scott Armstrong
February 24	The Brethren	Bob Woodward and Scott Armstrong
March 2	The Brethren	Bob Woodward and Scott Armstrong
March 9	The Brethren	Bob Woodward and Scott Armstrong
March 16	The Brethren	Bob Woodward and Scott Armstrong
March 23	Donahue: My Own Story	Phil Donahue
March 30	Donahue: My Own Story	Phil Donahue
April 6	Free to Choose	Milton and Rose Friedman
April 13	Free to Choose	Milton and Rose Friedman
April 20	Free to Choose	Milton and Rose Friedman
April 27	Free to Choose	Milton and Rose Friedman
May 4	Free to Choose	Milton and Rose Friedman
May 11	Free to Choose	Milton and Rose Friedman
May 18	Men in Love	Nancy Friday
May 25	Thy Neighbor's Wife	Gay Talese
June 1	Thy Neighbor's Wife	Gay Talese
June 8	Thy Neighbor's Wife	Gay Talese
June 15	Thy Neighbor's Wife	Gay Talese
June 22	Thy Neighbor's Wife	Gay Talese
June 29	Thy Neighbor's Wife	Gay Talese
July 6	Thy Neighbor's Wife	Gay Talese
July 13	Thy Neighbor's Wife	Gay Talese
July 20	Thy Neighbor's Wife	Gay Talese
July 27	Thy Neighbor's Wife	Gay Talese
August 3	Shelley: Also known as Shirley	Shelley Winters
August 10	Shelley: Also known as Shirley	Shelley Winters
August 17	Shelley: Also known as Shirley	Shelley Winters
August 24	Shelley: Also known as Shirley	Shelley Winters
August 31	Shelley: Also known as Shirley	Shelley Winters
September 7	Shelley: Also known as Shirley	Shelley Winters
September 14	Shelley: Also known as Shirley	Shelley Winters
September 21	Crisis Investing	Doug R. Casey
September 28	Crisis Investing	Doug R. Casey
October 5	Crisis Investing	Doug R. Casey
October 12	Crisis Investing	Doug R. Casey
October 19	Crisis Investing	Doug R. Casey
October 26	Crisis Investing	Doug R. Casey
November 2	Crisis Investing	Doug R. Casey
November 9	Cosmos	Carl Sagan
November 16	Cosmos	Carl Sagan
November 23	Cosmos	Carl Sagan
November 30	Cosmos	Carl Sagan
December 7	Cosmos	Carl Sagan
December 14	Cosmos	Carl Sagan
December 21	Cosmos	Carl Sagan
December 28	Cosmos	Carl Sagan

== See also ==
- Publishers Weekly list of bestselling novels in the United States in the 1980s
