= List of The New York Times number-one books of 1985 =

The American daily newspaper The New York Times publishes multiple weekly lists ranking the best-selling books in the United States.

== Fiction ==
The following list ranks the number-one best-selling fiction books, in the hardcover fiction category.

Date	Book	Author
January 6	The Talisman	Stephen King and Peter Straub
January 13	The Talisman	Stephen King and Peter Straub
January 20	The Sicilian	Mario Puzo
January 27	The Sicilian	Mario Puzo
February 3	If Tomorrow Comes	Sidney Sheldon
February 10	If Tomorrow Comes	Sidney Sheldon
February 17	If Tomorrow Comes	Sidney Sheldon
February 24	If Tomorrow Comes	Sidney Sheldon
March 3	If Tomorrow Comes	Sidney Sheldon
March 10	If Tomorrow Comes	Sidney Sheldon
March 17	If Tomorrow Comes	Sidney Sheldon
March 24	If Tomorrow Comes	Sidney Sheldon
March 31	Family Album	Danielle Steel
April 7	Family Album	Danielle Steel
April 14	Family Album	Danielle Steel
April 21	Family Album	Danielle Steel
April 28	Thinner	Richard Bachman
May 5	Thinner	Richard Bachman
May 12	Thinner	Richard Bachman
May 19	Thinner	Richard Bachman
May 26	If Tomorrow Comes	Sidney Sheldon
June 2	Jubal Sackett	Louis L'Amour
June 9	Hold the Dream	Barbara Taylor Bradford
June 16	The Cider House Rules	John Irving
June 23	Skeleton Crew	Stephen King
June 30	Skeleton Crew	Stephen King
July 7	Skeleton Crew	Stephen King
July 14	Skeleton Crew	Stephen King
July 21	Skeleton Crew	Stephen King
July 28	Skeleton Crew	Stephen King
August 4	Skeleton Crew	Stephen King
August 11	Skeleton Crew	Stephen King
August 18	Skeleton Crew	Stephen King
August 25	Skeleton Crew	Stephen King
September 1	Lucky	Jackie Collins
September 8	Lucky	Jackie Collins
September 15	Lake Wobegon Days	Garrison Keillor
September 22	Lake Wobegon Days	Garrison Keillor
September 29	Lake Wobegon Days	Garrison Keillor
October 6	Lake Wobegon Days	Garrison Keillor
October 13	Texas	James Michener
October 20	Texas	James Michener
October 27	Texas	James Michener
November 3	Texas	James Michener
November 10	Texas	James Michener
November 17	Texas	James Michener
November 24	The Mammoth Hunters	Jean M. Auel
December 1	The Mammoth Hunters	Jean M. Auel
December 8	The Mammoth Hunters	Jean M. Auel
December 15	The Mammoth Hunters	Jean M. Auel
December 22	The Mammoth Hunters	Jean M. Auel
December 29	Lake Wobegon Days	Garrison Keillor

== Nonfiction ==
The following list ranks the number-one best-selling nonfiction books, in the hardcover nonfiction category.

Date	Book	Author
January 6	Iacocca: An Autobiography	Lee Iacocca with William Novak
January 13	Iacocca: An Autobiography	Lee Iacocca with William Novak
January 20	Iacocca: An Autobiography	Lee Iacocca with William Novak
January 27	Iacocca: An Autobiography	Lee Iacocca with William Novak
February 3	Iacocca: An Autobiography	Lee Iacocca with William Novak
February 10	Iacocca: An Autobiography	Lee Iacocca with William Novak
February 17	Iacocca: An Autobiography	Lee Iacocca with William Novak
February 24	Iacocca: An Autobiography	Lee Iacocca with William Novak
March 3	Iacocca: An Autobiography	Lee Iacocca with William Novak
March 10	Iacocca: An Autobiography	Lee Iacocca with William Novak
March 17	Iacocca: An Autobiography	Lee Iacocca with William Novak
March 24	Iacocca: An Autobiography	Lee Iacocca with William Novak
March 31	Iacocca: An Autobiography	Lee Iacocca with William Novak
April 7	Iacocca: An Autobiography	Lee Iacocca with William Novak
April 14	Iacocca: An Autobiography	Lee Iacocca with William Novak
April 21	Iacocca: An Autobiography	Lee Iacocca with William Novak
April 28	Iacocca: An Autobiography	Lee Iacocca with William Novak
May 5	Iacocca: An Autobiography	Lee Iacocca with William Novak
May 12	Iacocca: An Autobiography	Lee Iacocca with William Novak
May 19	Iacocca: An Autobiography	Lee Iacocca with William Novak
May 26	Iacocca: An Autobiography	Lee Iacocca with William Novak
June 2	Iacocca: An Autobiography	Lee Iacocca with William Novak
June 9	A Passion for Excellence	Tom Peters and Nancy Austin
June 16	Iacocca: An Autobiography	Lee Iacocca with William Novak
June 23	Iacocca: An Autobiography	Lee Iacocca with William Novak
June 30	Iacocca: An Autobiography	Lee Iacocca with William Novak
July 7	Iacocca: An Autobiography	Lee Iacocca with William Novak
July 14	Iacocca: An Autobiography	Lee Iacocca with William Novak
July 21	Yeager: An Autobiography	Chuck Yeager and Leo Janos
July 28	Yeager: An Autobiography	Chuck Yeager and Leo Janos
August 4	Yeager: An Autobiography	Chuck Yeager and Leo Janos
August 11	Yeager: An Autobiography	Chuck Yeager and Leo Janos
August 18	Yeager: An Autobiography	Chuck Yeager and Leo Janos
August 25	Yeager: An Autobiography	Chuck Yeager and Leo Janos
September 1	Yeager: An Autobiography	Chuck Yeager and Leo Janos
September 8	Yeager: An Autobiography	Chuck Yeager and Leo Janos
September 15	Yeager: An Autobiography	Chuck Yeager and Leo Janos
September 22	Yeager: An Autobiography	Chuck Yeager and Leo Janos
September 29	Elvis and Me	Priscilla Beaulieu Presley with Sandra Harmon
October 6	Elvis and Me	Priscilla Beaulieu Presley with Sandra Harmon
October 13	Elvis and Me	Priscilla Beaulieu Presley with Sandra Harmon
October 20	Elvis and Me	Priscilla Beaulieu Presley with Sandra Harmon
October 27	Elvis and Me	Priscilla Beaulieu Presley with Sandra Harmon
November 3	Elvis and Me	Priscilla Beaulieu Presley with Sandra Harmon
November 10	Elvis and Me	Priscilla Beaulieu Presley with Sandra Harmon
November 17	Elvis and Me	Priscilla Beaulieu Presley with Sandra Harmon
November 24	Elvis and Me	Priscilla Beaulieu Presley with Sandra Harmon
December 1	Yeager: An Autobiography	Chuck Yeager and Leo Janos
December 8	Yeager: An Autobiography	Chuck Yeager and Leo Janos
December 15	Yeager: An Autobiography	Chuck Yeager and Leo Janos
December 22	Yeager: An Autobiography	Chuck Yeager and Leo Janos
December 29	Yeager: An Autobiography	Chuck Yeager and Leo Janos

== See also ==
- Publishers Weekly list of bestselling novels in the United States in the 1980s
