= Morton L. Janklow =

American literary agent (1930–2022)

Morton L. "Mort" Janklow
- Born: Morton Lloyd Janklow; May 30, 1930; New York City, U.S.
- Died: May 25, 2022 (aged 91); Water Mill, New York, U.S.
- Education: Syracuse University; Columbia Law School
- Occupation: Literary agent
- Spouses: Marjorie Perrin (m. 1953; div. 1959) Linda LeRoy (m. 1960)
- Children: 2
- Relatives: Mervyn LeRoy (father-in-law); Harry Warner (grandfather-in-law)

Morton Lloyd Janklow (May 30, 1930 – May 25, 2022) was an American literary agent, the primary partner in Janklow & Nesbit Associates, a New York–based literary agency. His clients included Barbara Taylor Bradford, Thomas Harris, Judith Krantz, Pope John Paul II, Nancy Reagan, Anne Rice, Sidney Sheldon, Danielle Steel, Barbara Walters, and four U.S. presidents.

== Early life ==
Janklow was born in Queens on May 30, 1930. His family was Jewish. His father, Maurice, worked as a lawyer; his mother was Lillian (Levantin). Janklow attended Far Rockaway High School, where he was editor of the school newspaper and captain of its tennis team. He intended to study at an Ivy League school but went to Syracuse University, one of only a handful of colleges that would accept a 16-year-old high school graduate. He earned a degree in political science from Syracuse in 1950. He was subsequently admitted to Columbia Law School, where he obtained his law degree in 1953.

== Career ==
After practicing law in the US Army during the mid-1950s, Janklow worked for the law firm Spear and Hill starting in 1960, eventually becoming a partner. He also established a company called Trans-Video, which purchased a San Diego–based cable television franchise before selling it to Cox Broadcasting in the mid-1960s for a considerable return. This enabled him and his fellow partner at Spear, Jerome Traum, to start their own law firm, Janklow & Traum, in 1967.

Janklow became a literary agent in 1972, when his friend and client, William Safire, asked him to handle a book he was writing about Richard Nixon. Janklow successfully negotiated a $250,000 deal with publisher William Morrow and Company for Before the Fall (1975). He also ushered in a new era in authors' rights when he successfully sued William Morrow for violating their contract when it tried to abandon the book. According to him, "they said, 'You can't force a publisher to print a book; that's never been done' ... we took the publisher out of the captain's seat and put the author in it. The publisher is replaceable; the author is not." Another version of this story emphasized Janklow's role in changing the standard publishing agreement to be more fair for authors. Janklow is quoted as saying "I'm not trying to force the publisher to publish the book. I'm just trying to force the publisher to pay for it." He ultimately recouped about one-third of his advance, a ground-breaking amount at a time when writers normally had to return all the money.

Janklow formed Morton L. Janklow Associates in 1977, distinct from his law firm. That same year, he arranged a deal worth over $1 million with Ballantine Books for Full Disclosure, another work by Safire. This was reportedly the highest advance paid for a first novel at the time. He later worked out a $3.2 million contract for the paperback rights to Princess Daisy (1980) by Judith Krantz. Janklow was noted for receiving commissions of 15 percent, when the standard rate for agents was 10 percent. He was also able to gain signing bonuses, subsidiary rights for television and movie spin-offs, and book club and international publishing deals. He even made headway in areas over which authors seldom had influence over, such as advertising and promotional campaigns, as well as details of a book cover and jacket. Janklow subsequently partnered with Lynn Nesbit, another agent working for International Creative Management, to form Janklow & Nesbit Associates in 1989. She yielded clients such as Toni Morrison, Robert Caro, Tom Wolfe, John le Carré, and Nora Ephron.

In 1982, Janklow founded the Morton L. Janklow Program for Advocacy in the Arts at Columbia University and later established the Morton L. Janklow Professorship of Literary and Artistic Property Law; Janklow also taught in the program.

== Notable clients ==
- Barbara Taylor Bradford
- Thomas Harris
- Judith Krantz
- Michael Moore
- Pope John Paul II
- Nancy Reagan
- Ronald Reagan
- Anne Rice
- William Safire
- Sidney Sheldon
- Danielle Steel
- Barbara Walters

== Personal life ==
Janklow married his first wife, Marjorie Perrin, in 1953. They divorced in 1959. One year later, he married Linda LeRoy, the daughter of Mervyn LeRoy and granddaughter of Harry Warner. They had two children: Angela and Luke.

Janklow died on the morning of May 25, 2022, at his home in Water Mill, New York, five days before his 92nd birthday. He had heart failure prior to his death.

== Bibliography ==
- Ferrari-Adler, Jofie (January 2008), "Agents & Editors: A Q&A With Agent Lynn Nesbit", Poets & Writers
- Gladwell, Malcolm (October 11, 2010), "Talent Grab", The New Yorker, pp. 88–89
- Janklow, Morton (September 27, 2009), "Remembering Bill Safire", The Daily Beast
- Marquis (1991). Marquis Who's Who in the World, 1991-1992. Wilmette, IL: A. N. Marquis. ISBN 0-8379-1110-9.
- Morrisroe, Patricia (February 2, 1987). Mega Mort.
