= Publishers Weekly list of bestselling novels in the United States in the 1980s =

This is a list of bestselling novels in the United States in the 1980s, as determined by Publishers Weekly. The list features the most popular novels of each year from 1980 through 1989.

The standards set for inclusion in the lists – which, for example, led to the exclusion of the novels in the Harry Potter series from the lists for the 1990s and 2000s – are currently unknown.

== 1980 ==
1. The Covenant by James A. Michener
2. The Bourne Identity by Robert Ludlum
3. Rage of Angels by Sidney Sheldon
4. Princess Daisy by Judith Krantz
5. Firestarter by Stephen King
6. The Key to Rebecca by Ken Follett
7. Random Winds by Belva Plain
8. The Devil's Alternative by Frederick Forsyth
9. The Fifth Horseman by Larry Collins and Dominique Lapierre
10. The Spike by Arnaud de Borchgrave and Robert Moss

== 1981 ==
1. Noble House by James Clavell
2. The Hotel New Hampshire by John Irving
3. Cujo by Stephen King
4. An Indecent Obsession by Colleen McCullough
5. Gorky Park by Martin Cruz Smith
6. Masquerade by Kit Williams
7. Goodbye, Janette by Harold Robbins
8. The Third Deadly Sin by Lawrence Sanders
9. The Glitter Dome by Joseph Wambaugh
10. No Time for Tears by Cynthia Freeman

== 1982 ==
1. E.T., The Extraterrestrial by William Kotzwinkle
2. Space by James A. Michener
3. The Parsifal Mosaic by Robert Ludlum
4. Master of the Game by Sidney Sheldon
5. Mistral's Daughter by Judith Krantz
6. The Valley of Horses by Jean M. Auel
7. Different Seasons by Stephen King
8. North and South by John Jakes
9. 2010: Odyssey Two by Arthur C. Clarke
10. The Man from St. Petersburg by Ken Follett

== 1983 ==
1. Return of the Jedi by James Kahn
2. Poland by James A. Michener
3. Pet Sematary by Stephen King
4. The Little Drummer Girl by John le Carré
5. Christine by Stephen King
6. Changes by Danielle Steel
7. The Name of the Rose by Umberto Eco
8. White Gold Wielder by Stephen R. Donaldson
9. Hollywood Wives by Jackie Collins
10. The Lonesome Gods by Louis L'Amour

== 1984 ==
1. The Talisman by Stephen King and Peter Straub
2. The Aquitaine Progression by Robert Ludlum
3. The Sicilian by Mario Puzo
4. Love and War by John Jakes
5. The Butter Battle Book by Dr. Seuss
6. "...And Ladies of the Club" by Helen Hooven Santmyer
7. The Fourth Protocol by Frederick Forsyth
8. Full Circle by Danielle Steel
9. The Life and Hard Times of Heidi Abromowitz by Joan Rivers
10. Lincoln by Gore Vidal

== 1985 ==
1. The Mammoth Hunters by Jean M. Auel
2. Texas by James A. Michener
3. Lake Wobegon Days by Garrison Keillor
4. If Tomorrow Comes by Sidney Sheldon
5. Skeleton Crew by Stephen King
6. Secrets by Danielle Steel
7. Contact by Carl Sagan
8. Lucky by Jackie Collins
9. Family Album by Danielle Steel
10. Jubal Sackett by Louis L'Amour

== 1986 ==
1. It by Stephen King
2. Red Storm Rising by Tom Clancy and Larry Bond
3. Whirlwind by James Clavell
4. The Bourne Supremacy by Robert Ludlum
5. Hollywood Husbands by Jackie Collins
6. Wanderlust by Danielle Steel
7. I'll Take Manhattan by Judith Krantz
8. Last of the Breed by Louis L'Amour
9. The Prince of Tides by Pat Conroy
10. A Perfect Spy by John le Carré

== 1987 ==
1. The Tommyknockers by Stephen King
2. Patriot Games by Tom Clancy
3. Kaleidoscope by Danielle Steel
4. Misery by Stephen King
5. Leaving Home by Garrison Keillor
6. Windmills of the Gods by Sidney Sheldon
7. Presumed Innocent by Scott Turow
8. Fine Things by Danielle Steel
9. Heaven and Hell by John Jakes
10. The Eyes of the Dragon by Stephen King

== 1988 ==
1. The Cardinal of the Kremlin by Tom Clancy
2. The Sands of Time by Sidney Sheldon
3. Zoya by Danielle Steel
4. The Icarus Agenda by Robert Ludlum
5. Alaska by James A. Michener
6. Till We Meet Again by Judith Krantz
7. The Queen of the Damned by Anne Rice
8. To Be the Best by Barbara Taylor Bradford
9. One by Richard Bach
10. Mitla Pass by Leon Uris

== 1989 ==
1. Clear and Present Danger by Tom Clancy
2. The Dark Half by Stephen King
3. Daddy by Danielle Steel
4. Star by Danielle Steel
5. Caribbean by James A. Michener
6. The Satanic Verses by Salman Rushdie
7. The Russia House by John le Carré
8. The Pillars of the Earth by Ken Follett
9. California Gold by John Jakes
10. While My Pretty One Sleeps by Mary Higgins Clark
