= Scruples (novel) =

1978 novel by Judith Krantz

- First edition (publ. Crown Publishers)
- Author: Judith Krantz
- Language: English
- Publication date: 1978

Scruples is a 1978 novel by Judith Krantz, first published by Crown. It was her debut novel. A direct sequel, Scruples Two, was published in 1992.

The novel details the life story of protagonist Wilhelmina Hunnewell Winthrop ("Billy"), as she evolves from the overweight "poor relation" in an aristocratic Boston Brahmin family to become a thin, stylish woman who is left a vast fortune by the death of her much older first husband and who founds an upscale Beverly Hills boutique called "Scruples".

The book helped define a new sub-genre of the romance novel — the bonkbuster.

== Plot ==
Born the only child of a distinguished scientist, who is a member of the venerable Winthrop family but must work for a living, Wilhelmina is nicknamed "Honey", a diminutive of her middle name. In her infancy, her mother dies and she is raised by her distant father and a housekeeper. She grows up isolated from her extended family and, with the help of the housekeeper, turns to food for comfort. Around the time she graduates from high school, she is left $10,000 by a maiden aunt, who begs her to spend it foolishly while she is still young. In a last-ditch effort to "find herself", Honey goes to live in Paris with a French family. There, she undergoes a transformation of both body and soul, first changing her name to Billy, then losing weight, and then gaining Parisian style under the guidance of Liliane, the elegant Frenchwoman who is her hostess. She is also introduced to Edouard, Liliane's relative. It is her first sexual affair, but when the aristocratic but impecunious Edouard discovers that Billy has no money, he shows his true colors and ends the relationship.

Billy returns to America and to a Boston stunned by her new body and beauty. Feeling "not in her skin", and unwilling, at 19, to start college, she moves to New York to attend the Katharine Gibbs secretarial school and prepare to earn a living. She meets Jessica, her New York roommate, who teaches her about men and sex and becomes her closest friend, and embarks on a whirlwind adventure of sexual discovery. When she graduates from Katie Gibbs, she is hired by Ikehorn Enterprises, and during a business meeting in Barbados, she sleeps with and subsequently marries the CEO, Ellis Ikehorn, who is far older than she. The next several years are happy ones, as Billy and Ellis live a glamorous life filled with parties, homes all over the world, and regular appearances on the Best-Dressed List. Ellis, however, suffers two debilitating strokes, and Billy moves them from Manhattan to Bel Air, for the better climate.

But Billy lives as a recluse in their enormous house and looks aimlessly for some purpose in her life, eventually developing a compulsion to shop in Beverly Hills. Seven years after Ellis' stroke, he dies, leaving Billy an enormous fortune but also an enormous amount of guilt. Billy realizes that she will never find "what she is looking for" so she decides to open a luxury boutique called "Scruples." She hires Valentine O'Neil to design couture clothing for the customers and Valentine's close friend, Spider Elliot, a former fashion photographer who appoints himself the Style Director and arbiter of elegance. The meeting, various romances, and career vicissitudes of Valentine and Spider, along with the development of their relationship, comprise a major subplot in the novel.

The story ultimately develops around Billy's second marriage to Vito Orsini, a film producer, a film that he is making, and then around the Oscars. A second subplot concerns Billy's new friend Dolly Moon, a flamboyant supporting actress in Vito's current film project, Mirrors, Dolly's pregnancy, her relationship with an accountant, and a burglary at Price Waterhouse, where the Oscar ballots are tabulated and the results stored. The story ends at the Oscars, where Billy awaits the announcement that Vito's film has won and Dolly dramatically goes into labor. At the same time, Spider and Valentine realize that their friendship has turned into love.

== TV adaptations ==
The novel was adapted as a hugely successful television miniseries in 1980, starring Lindsay Wagner as Billy, Barry Bostwick as Spider, Kim Cattrall as Melanie, Marie-France Pisier as Valentine, Connie Stevens as Maggie, and film legend Gene Tierney (in her final role) as Harriet Toppington.

Due to the success of the mini-series, a pilot for a potential weekly series (featuring a different cast) was produced the following year, but was unsuccessful. In this version, Shelley Smith played Billy Ikehorn, and Dirk Benedict played Spider.

Another pilot for a potential Scruples series was made in 2012 by Warner Bros. Television for ABC, though this also was unsuccessful when the network opted to pass on the project. Co-produced by Natalie Portman, it starred Claire Forlani as Billy. The cast also included Chad Michael Murray as Spider, Karine Vanasse as Valentine, Gary Cole as Royce Franklin, Hart Bochner as Ellis Ikehorn, and Mimi Rogers as Harriet Toppington.
