= Stephanie Dunnam =

American actress

- Born: March 28, 1959 (age 67); Oak Harbor, Washington, U.S.
- Occupation: Actress
- Years active: 1981–present

Stephanie Dunnam (born March 28, 1959) is an American actress.

== Life and career ==
Dunnam was born in Oak Harbor, Washington and moved to Dallas, Texas, when she was four years old after her parents divorced. Her father was a weapons officer on the USS Midway on an American air base in Japan and she went to live with him there at the age of 13. It was there that she was introduced to acting and theatre through the community theatre group on the base. She returned to the United States during high school and attended Richardson High School in Richardson, Texas where she studied with Barney Hammond and gives him credit for teaching her a professional ethic and instilling in her the drive to excel artistically. In 1982, Dunnam made her big screen debut appearing in the action film Silent Rage and later was featured in the made-for-television movie Miss All-American Beauty. She appeared in the 1983 horror film, Play Dead opposite Yvonne De Carlo. Later in 1983, she was cast as one of lead characters in the CBS prime time soap opera, Emerald Point N.A.S. as Kay Mallory Matthews. The series was canceled after 22 episodes in 1984. Later in 1984, Dunnam starred opposite Stefanie Powers in the eight-hour CBS miniseries, Mistral's Daughter based on Judith Krantz's 1982 novel of the same name, as Theodora 'Teddy' Lunel, the daughter of Powers' character.

Dunnam made guest appearances in a number of television series, including Magnum, P.I., Scarecrow and Mrs. King, Moonlighting, Frasier, Home Improvement, Murder, She Wrote, Chicago Hope, ER, The Practice and Boston Public. From 1987 to 1988 she played Karen Atkinson in the ABC prime time soap opera, Dynasty appearing in ten episodes.

Dunnam performed on Broadway tours of The Heidi Chronicles and The Sisters Rosensweig. She also performed in other stage productions, off-Broadway and regional theater, include The School for Scandal, The Master Builder, The Lady's Not for Burning, The Rivals, The Importance of Being Earnest, Lost Highway, Cat's Cradle, An American Daughter, The Grapes of Wrath, Happy Days and The Lion in Winter.
