= Winthrop (surname) =

Winthrop is a surname. Notable people with the surname include:

== People ==
- Beekman Winthrop (1874–1940), New York lawyer and Governor of Puerto Rico
- Clara Winthrop (1876–after 1935), American philanthropist
- Egerton Leigh Winthrop (1838-1916), American lawyer and clubman who was prominent in New York society during the Gilded Age
- Fitz-John Winthrop (1637-1707), American governor of the Colony of Connecticut from 1698 until his death
- Frederic Bronson Winthrop (1863-1944), American philanthropist and lawyer who was prominent in New York society during the Gilded Age
- John Winthrop (c. 1587–1649), English-born founding governor of the Massachusetts Bay Colony
- John Winthrop, the Younger (1606–1676), English-born governor of Connecticut
- John Winthrop (1714–1779), American astronomer and professor at Harvard College
- Robert Winthrop (1764-1832), American Royal Navy Vice Admiral
- Robert Charles Winthrop (1809–1894), American lawyer and philanthropist
- Theodore Winthrop (1828–1861), American writer, lawyer, and world traveler
- Thomas L. Winthrop (1760–1841), American Lieutenant Governor of Massachusetts
- Waitstill Winthrop (1641/2-1717), American colonial magistrate, military officer, and politician of New England

== Fictional characters ==
- Eliza Winthrop, the main character in Nancy Garden's Annie on My Mind (1982)
- Ethan Winthrop, a character on the daytime drama Passions
- Ivy Winthrop, a character on the daytime drama Passions
- Jane Winthrop, a character on the daytime drama Passions
- Sarah Winthrop, a character on the daytime drama Passions
- Franklin Winthrop, a character in the HBO series Oz
- Louis Winthorpe III, a character from the movie Trading Places played by Dan Aykroyd
- Wilhelmina "Billy" Hunnewell Winthrop, the main character in Judith Krantz's bestselling novels Scruples and Scruples Two, stepmother to the main character of Lovers, Gigi Orsini
- Cosmo Winthrop III, a character on the racing video game Downhill Domination

== See also ==
- Winthrop
