= Merete Van Kamp =

Danish model, actress and singer

- Born: 1967 (age 58–59); Kolding, Denmark
- Occupations: Model; actress; singer
- Years active: 1978 –2026
- Known for: Princess Daisy a mini-series, Dallas TV series as character Grace Van Owen
- Spouse: Jean Claude Friederich
- Children: 1
- Awards: The Golden HALO Award
- Website: https://shop.thevankampstudio.com

Merete Van Kamp (born 1967) is a Danish model, actress and singer.

== Early life ==
Merete Van Kamp was born in Kolding, Denmark in 1961. She began modeling with Parker Zed modelling agency in Hamburg, Germany followed by L'Agence in Paris, France and Elite in Los Angeles California USA internationally. Then Merete Van Kamp was recruited by the Talent agent John LaRocca.

== Career ==
Merete Van Kamp's first film role was in the 1983 espionage thriller The Osterman Weekend, directed by Sam Peckinpah playing opposite John Hurt.

She was then chosen out of 700 actresses to play the lead roles of Princess Daisy Valenski and Dani Valenski in the NBC television miniseries Princess Daisy, written by Judith Krantz. From 1985 to 1986, she had a regular role as Grace Van Owen on the television series Dallas. From 1987 to 1997, Merete Van Kamp was training vocals and dance to record an album for EMI-France entitled Pleasure and Pain, produced by Frank Langolff, who composed seven of the nine tracks (the other two were Rick F. James compositions).

She guest-starred in several episodes of Hotel and Remington Steele and has appeared in feature films, including You Can't Hurry Love with Bridget Fonda, and Mission Kill, with Robert Ginty and Olivia d'Abo, directed by David Winters. She was the lead in Lethal Woman (with Shannon Tweed), Poison Ivy: The New Seduction (the third of the four-film series), and Westbrick Murders with Eric Roberts. Van Kamp appeared on the series De 7 Drab in 2010.

In 2017, Merete Van Kamp founded Le Van Kamp Studio in Paris, and began writing a drama thriller series and making her ACTORS do skids at Teatre ALLIORS in Paris, France that she would be writing .

== Filmography ==
Merete Van Kamp film and television credits
Year	Title	Role	Notes	Ref.
1983	The Osterman Weekend	Zuna Brickman	Theatrical film	
1983	Princess Daisy	Princess Daisy Valenski / Dani Valenski	TV miniseries	
1984	Remington Steele	Gwen Whitewood	1 episode	
1985	Mission Kill	Sydney Borghini	Theatrical film	
1985–1986	Dallas	Grace Van Owen	Regular role	
1988	You Can't Hurry Love	Monique	Theatrical film	
1988	Hotel	Devon Sloan	2 episodes	
1988	The Most Dangerous Woman Alive	Lt. Christine Newhouse (Diana)	Theatrical film, aka Lethal Woman	
1997	Poison Ivy: The New Seduction	Catherine Greer	Theatrical film	
2004	Lotto	Upperclass Lady		
2008	Craig	Leila	Theatrical film	
2010	De 7 Drab	Elizabeth Wæver	1 episode	
2010	The Protectors	Petra Grashof	1 episode	
2010	Westbrick Murders	Rebecca Sommerson	Theatrical film	
2014	The Will	Ann Stockwell	Theatrical film	
2015	I Got Something to say	Wife		
