= Sea Airs =

Studio album by Rick Wakeman
- Released: November 1989
- Recorded: 1985–89
- Length: 47:30
- Label: President
- Producer: Rick Wakeman

Rick Wakeman chronology
| Country Airs (1986) | Sea Airs (1989) | Night Airs (1990) |

Sea Airs is a piano album written by rock musician Rick Wakeman and released in November 1989. It is the second in a trilogy of New Age piano albums. The first album in the trilogy is Country Airs and the third album in the trilogy is Night Airs.

== Track listing ==
| No. | Title | Length |
|---|---|---|
| 1. | "Harbour Lights" | 5:15 |
| 2. | "The Pirate" | 4:39 |
| 3. | "Storm Clouds" | 3:34 |
| 4. | "Lost at Sea" | 3:25 |
| 5. | "The Mermaid" | 3:26 |
| 6. | "Waves" | 3:29 |
| 7. | "The Fisherman" | 3:30 |
| 8. | "Flying Fish" | 3:14 |
| 9. | "The Marie Celeste" | 4:37 |
| 10. | "Time and Tide" | 4:30 |
| 11. | "The Lone Sailor" | 3:43 |
| 12. | "The Sailor´s Lament" | 4:35 |

== Personnel ==
- Rick Wakeman - piano, production

== Trivia ==
By accident, a couple of the tracks on Sea Airs were destined for Night Airs and vice versa. However, they somehow ended up on the wrong CDs. As the CDs had already been pressed and mastered the only solution was for Rick Wakeman to change the titles of the tracks involved at the last minute. However, he has never owned up to which tracks ended up on the wrong CDs.
