= Free to Choose (book) =

Book and television series produced by the Friedmans

Free to Choose: A Personal Statement
- Authors: Milton Friedman; Rose Friedman
- Language: English
- Genre: Nonfiction
- Publisher: Harcourt
- Publication date: 1980
- Publication place: United States
- Media type: Hardback
- Pages: xii, 338
- ISBN: 0-15-133481-1
- OCLC: 797729203
- Dewey Decimal: 330.12/2
- LC Class: HB501 .F72

Free to Choose: A Personal Statement is a 1980 book by economists Milton and Rose Friedman that advocates free market principles. It was a response to an earlier landmark book and television series The Age of Uncertainty, by the noted economist John Kenneth Galbraith.

The Friedmans maintain that the free market works best for all members of a society, provides examples of how the free market engenders prosperity, and maintains that it can solve problems where other approaches have failed. Published in January 1980, the 297-page book contains ten chapters. It was atop the The New York Times Best Seller list for six weeks. The book was accompanied by a ten-part television series of the same name broadcast by PBS in 1980 and updated in 1990.

== Positions advocated ==
The Friedmans advocate laissez-faire economic policies, often criticizing interventionist government policies and their cost in personal freedoms and economic efficiency in the United States and abroad. They argue that international free trade has been restricted through tariffs and protectionism while domestic free trade and freedom have been limited through high taxation and regulation. They cite the 19th-century United Kingdom, the United States before the Great Depression, and modern Hong Kong as ideal examples of a minimalist economic policy. They contrast the economic growth of Japan after the Meiji Restoration and the economic stagnation of India after its independence from the British Empire, and argue that India has performed worse despite its superior economic potential due to its centralized planning. They argue that even countries with command economies, including the Soviet Union and Yugoslavia, have been forced to adopt limited market mechanisms in order to operate.

The authors argue against government taxation on gas and tobacco and government regulation of the public school systems. The Friedmans claim that the Federal Reserve exacerbated the Great Depression by neglecting to prevent the decline of the money supply in the years leading up to it. They further argue that the American public falsely perceived the Depression to be a result of a failure of capitalism rather than the government, and that the Depression allowed the Federal Reserve Board to centralize its control of the monetary system despite its responsibility for it.

On the subject of welfare, the Friedmans argue that the United States has maintained a higher degree of freedom and productivity by avoiding the nationalizations and extensive welfare systems of Western European countries such as the United Kingdom and Sweden. However, they also argue that welfare practices since the New Deal under "the HEW empire" have been harmful. They argue that public assistance programs have become larger than originally envisioned and are creating "wards of the state" as opposed to "self-reliant individuals." They also argue that the Social Security System is fundamentally flawed, that urban renewal and public housing programs have contributed to racial inequality and diminished quality of low-income housing, and that Medicare and Medicaid are responsible for rising healthcare prices in the United States. They suggest completely replacing the welfare state with a negative income tax as a less harmful alternative.

The Friedmans also argue that declining academic performance in the United States is the result of increasing government control of the American education system tracing back to the 1840s, but suggest a voucher system as a politically feasible solution. They blame the 1970s recession and lower quality of consumer goods on extensive business regulations since the 1960s, and advocate abolishing the Food and Drug Administration, the Interstate Commerce Commission, the Consumer Product Safety Commission, Amtrak, and Conrail. They argue that the energy crisis would be resolved by abolishing the Department of Energy and price floors on crude oil. They recommend replacing the Environmental Protection Agency and environmental regulation with an effluent charge. They criticize labor unions for raising prices and lowering demand by enforcing high wage levels, and for contributing to unemployment by limiting jobs. They argue that inflation is caused by excessive government spending, the Federal Reserve's attempts to control interest rates, and full employment policy. They call for tighter control of Fed money supply despite the fact that it will result in a temporary period of high unemployment and low growth due to the interruption of the wage-price spiral. In the final chapter, they take note of recent current events that seem to suggest a return to free-market principles in academic thought and public opinion, and argue in favor of an "economic bill of rights" to cement the changes.

== See also ==
- List of The New York Times number-one books of 1980
- The Commanding Heights
