= Country Airs =

Studio album by Rick Wakeman
- Released: 1 April 1986
- Studio: Herne Place, Sunningdale
- Genre: Instrumental
- Length: 38:13
- Label: Coda; President (1992 edition)
- Producer: Rick Wakeman

Rick Wakeman chronology
Live at Hammersmith (1985)	Country Airs (1986)	The Family Album (1987)

Alternative cover
- Front of the 1992 re-recorded edition

Country Airs is a studio album by English keyboardist Rick Wakeman. It was released in 1986 by Coda Records, and features piano instrumentals inspired by the countryside. The album marked a stylistic shift in Wakeman's output, having established himself primarily with progressive rock, concept albums, and commercial-oriented music at the start of the 1980s.

The album reached number one on the UK New Age chart. It was followed by two sequels, Sea Airs and Night Airs, released in 1989 and 1990, respectively for President Records. A re-recording with four new compositions was released in 1992, also published by President. Wakeman later revealed that he regretted this version, doing it only because Coda had gone bankrupt, and refused to sell him the rights to the original. The 1992 edition features Wakeman playing a digital piano, rather than an acoustic one.

In 2017, the album was re-issued on CD as "Country Airs - The Original Version" with the original recordings, plus two bonus tracks.

== Track listing ==
Side one
No.	Title	Length
1.	"Dandelion Dreams"	4:10
2.	"Stepping Stones"	3:46
3.	"Ducks And Drakes"	3:54
4.	"Morning Haze"	3:04
5.	"Waterfalls"	3:54

Side two
No.	Title	Length
6.	"Quiet Valleys"	4:21
7.	"Nature Trails"	3:10
8.	"Heather Carpets"	3:57
9.	"Lakeland Walks"	3:55
10.	"Wild Moors"	3:23

1992 CD reissue
No.	Title	Length
1.	"Dandelion Dreams"	4:12
2.	"Stepping Stones"	3:46
3.	"Ducks And Drakes"	3:55
4.	"Morning Haze"	3:06
5.	"Waterfalls"	3:55
6.	"Quiet Valleys"	4:22
7.	"Nature Trails"	3:20
8.	"Heather Carpets"	3:58
9.	"Lakeland Walks"	3:54
10.	"Wild Moors"	3:24

2017 CD reissue bonus tracks - "The Original Version"
No.	Title	Length
11.	"Sunrise To Sunset"	3:10
12.	"Sunset To Sunrise"	5:26

== Personnel ==
- Rick Wakeman – grand piano, production
