= Night Airs =

Studio album by Rick Wakeman
- Released: November 1990
- Recorded: 1990
- Length: 44:45
- Label: President Records
- Producer: Rick Wakeman

Rick Wakeman chronology
Sea Airs (1989)	Night Airs (1990)	Phantom Power (1990)

Night Airs is the third album in a trilogy of piano albums by British rock musician Rick Wakeman. The first album in the trilogy is Country Airs, and the second is Sea Airs.

== Track listing ==
No.	Title	Length
1.	"The Sad Dream"	4:59
2.	"Twilight"	4:17
3.	"The Sleeping Child"	4:39
4.	"Mr. Badger"	4:44
5.	"Jack Frost"	3:45
6.	"The Lone Star"	4:13
7.	"Rain Shadows"	5:04
8.	"Fox By Night"	3:44
9.	"Night Owls"	4:32
10.	"An Evening Romance"	4:58

== Trivia ==
By accident, a couple of the tracks on Sea Airs were destined for Night Airs and vice versa. However, they somehow ended up on the wrong CDs. As the CDs had already been pressed and mastered the only solution was for Rick Wakeman to change the titles of the tracks involved at the last minute. However, he has never owned up to which tracks ended up on the wrong CDs.

== Personnel ==
- Rick Wakeman - piano, production
