= Goodbye, Janette =

1981 novel by Harold Robbins

- Author: Harold Robbins
- Language: English
- Genre: Novel
- Publisher: Simon & Schuster
- Publication date: 1981
- Publication place: United States
- Media type: Print (hardback & paperback)
- Pages: 382 pp (hardback edition)
- Preceded by: Memories of Another Day
- Followed by: Spellbinder

Goodbye, Janette is a 1981 bestselling novel by Harold Robbins, and his 16th novel.

Though critically panned, it sold well. Over 77,000 copies were sold in the United Kingdom in ten days, and it had an advance printing of 3.75 million copies. The erotic novel concerns a woman and her daughters who survive a World War II prison camp and move into the world of high fashion, with liberal doses of sadomasochism in the plot.

The novel ranked seventh on the Publishers Weekly bestseller list for 1981.
