= Winthrop =

Winthrop may refer to:

== Places ==
=== United States ===
- Winthrop, Arkansas
- Winthrop, Connecticut is a village in Deep River, Connecticut
- Winthrop, Indiana
- Winthrop, Iowa
- Winthrop, Maine
  - Winthrop (CDP), Maine
- Winthrop, Massachusetts
- Winthrop, Minnesota
- Winthrop, Missouri
- Winthrop, New York
- Winthrop, Washington
  - Mount Winthrop

=== Elsewhere ===
- Winthrop, Ontario, Canada
- Winthrop, Western Australia
- Winthrop (crater), the lava-flooded remnant of a lunar impact crater in the Oceanus Procellarum

== People with the surname ==
- Winthrop (surname)

== People with the given name ==
- Winthrop W. Aldrich
- Winthrop Ames
- Winthrop Smillie Boggs
- Winthrop G. Brown
- Winthrop Chandler
- Winthrop M. Crane
- Winthrop More Daniels
- Winthrop Kellogg Edey
- Winthrop Sargent Gilman
- Winthrop Graham
- Winthrop Jordan
- Winthrop Kellogg
- Winthrop Welles Ketcham
- Winthrop Palmer
- Winthrop Mackworth Praed
- Winthrop Rockefeller (born: Winthrop Aldrich Rockefeller)
- Winthrop Paul Rockefeller
- Winthrop Rutherfurd
- Winthrop Sargeant
- Winthrop Sargent
- Winthrop Sargent (politician)
- Winthrop H. Smith
- Winthrop H. Smith Jr.
- Winthrop E. Stone
- Paul Winthrop McCobb
- Geoffrey Winthrop Young

== Other uses ==
- Winthrop (comic strip), a discontinued comic strip created by Dick Cavalli
- Winthrop House, a dormitory at Harvard University
- Winthrop Laboratories, a pharmaceuticals company that became part of Sterling Drug
- Winthrop University, in Rock Hill, South Carolina
- NYU Winthrop Hospital, in Mineola, New York
