= Princess Daisy (miniseries) =

1983 film directed by Waris Hussein

- Genre: Drama; Romance
- Based on: Princess Daisy by Judith Krantz
- Written by: Diana Hammond
- Directed by: Waris Hussein
- Starring: Merete Van Kamp; Lindsay Wagner; Paul Michael Glaser; Robert Urich; Claudia Cardinale; Rupert Everett; Stacy Keach
- Music by: Lalo Schifrin
- Country of origin: United States
- Original language: English

Production
- Executive producer: Steve Krantz
- Producer: Lillian Gallo
- Cinematography: Tony Imi; Charles Rosher Jr.
- Editor: Robert F. Shugrue
- Running time: 190 minutes
- Production companies: Steve Krantz Productions; NBC Productions

Original release
- Network: NBC
- Release: November 6 – November 7, 1983

Princess Daisy is a 1983 American television miniseries directed by Waris Hussein, based on the 1980 novel of the same name by Judith Krantz.

== Plot ==
Princess Daisy tells the story of a young girl who is sent to England to live with her father, Prince Valensky, after her mother's death in a car crash. Unfortunately, Daisy is immediately separated from her twin sister Dani, who is a special needs child not accepted by their father. When Daisy turns 16, their father dies in a plane accident. The girl is forced to take care of her life herself, especially when her half-brother starts seeing in her more than just a sister.

== Cast ==
Actor	Role
Starring
Lindsay Wagner	Francesca Valensky
Paul Michael Glaser	Fred North
Claudia Cardinale	Anabelle de Fourdemont Valensky
Robert Urich	Patrick Shannon
Rupert Everett	Ram Valensky
Sada Thompson	Masha
Jim Metzler	John
Stacy Keach	Prince Alexander "Stash" Valensky
Special guest stars
Barbara Bach	Vanessa Valerian
Ringo Starr	Robin Valerian
Introducing
Merete Van Kamp	Princess Daisy & Dani Valensky

== Critical reception ==
Richard Corliss wrote of the miniseries, "Not even trash can guarantee the happy ending, and, alas, it happened to Jane Doe: Princess Daisy proved a small screen bust." However, The Guardian was more positive; while it criticized the acting, it concluded, "Despite all that, Princess Daisy is much better quality kitsch than Lace. It has all the same, essential mini-series requirements: vulgar opulence, beautiful people, international locations, the lot. But it also has a strong, closely packed story line, with the kind of fairy tale elements—the mirror image twin, the evil step-relation—that can remind you of childhood frissons; and it has characters in place of those perambulating coat hangers we had last week. And if we customers don't take the trouble to distinguish between good and bad rubbish, you know exactly what kind we will get in future."
