= Play Dead (1983 film) =

- Film poster
- Directed by: Peter Wittman
- Written by: Lothrop W. Jordan
- Produced by: Francine Roudine
- Starring: Yvonne De Carlo; Stephanie Dunnam; David Cullinane; Glenn Kezer; Ron Jackson
- Music by: Robert Farrar
- Distributed by: Troma Entertainment
- Release date: May 10, 1985 (Corpus Christi, Texas)
- Running time: 86 minutes
- Country: United States
- Language: English

Play Dead (also known as Killer Dog and Satan's Dog) is a 1985 American horror film directed by Peter Wittman and starring Yvonne De Carlo.

== Plot summary ==
Hester is a wealthy heiress who was jilted years ago by her lover to marry her sister. Using her weapon of choice, a 200 lb. Rottweiler, Hester not only exacts her revenge on her sister and lover, but has now set her sights on the offspring of the ill-fated reunion.

== Production and release ==
Although the film was shot in 1981, it was not released until 1985.

== Reception ==
"If you’re an aficionado of crap cinema (like I am), you may want to check out Play Dead."
