= Crown Publishing Group =

American publishing company

- Parent company: Random House (Penguin Random House)
- Status: Active
- Founded: 1933
- Founders: Nat Wartels; Bob Simon
- Country of origin: United States
- Headquarters location: New York City, U.S.
- Distribution: Worldwide
- Official website: crownpublishing.com, crownlinepublishing.com

The Crown Publishing Group is a subsidiary of Penguin Random House that publishes across several fiction and non-fiction categories. Originally founded in 1933 as a remaindered books wholesaler called Outlet Book Company, the firm expanded into publishing original content in 1936 under the Crown name, and was acquired by Random House in 1988. Under Random House's ownership, the Crown Publishing Group was operated as an independent division until 2018, when it was merged with the rest of Random House's adult programs.

== History ==
=== Outlet Book Company ===
The company was founded in 1933 as the Outlet Book Company by Nat Wartels and Bob Simon. Outlet Book Company began by featuring overstock and remaindered books, but soon moved into reprints of backlist, out-of-print, largely non-fiction titles, then into reprints of bestselling fiction and non-fiction, and eventually into original titles. It was under the Crown name that they began to publish original content in 1936.

Crown acquired bankrupt publishers such as Covici-Friede, Henkle-Yewdale, and Robert M. McBride in the 1940s. Other publishers acquired by Crown include Arcadia House; Howell, Soskin; and Julian Press. Clarkson Potter became affiliated with Crown in 1963.

Under the direction of Wartels, Alan Mirken, Joseph Reiner and others, Crown Books became one of the Outlet Book Company's lead imprints for original publishing which included such landmark fiction and non-fiction as Judith Krantz's Princess Daisy, Jean M. Auel's The Clan of the Cave Bear and Alex Comfort's The Joy of Sex in its early high-profile years.

Crown Publishing Group had its headquarters at 225 Park Avenue South in Midtown Manhattan, occupying 80,000 square feet (7,400 m^{2}) of space. Random House received the space when it acquired the company. In 1990 Random House signaled intentions to sublease the space.

=== Random House ===
The Outlet Book Company's Crown Books remained an independent company until 1988 when it was purchased by Random House.

In 2008, the Doubleday Business/Currency, Doubleday Religion, and WaterBrook Multnomah divisions were moved from Doubleday to Crown when Doubleday was merged with Knopf. Doubleday Religion was replaced with the Catholic imprint Image in 2011.

In 2018, Crown was combined with the main Random House Publishing Group.

== Imprints ==
Following the 2018 reorganization, the imprints that constitute Crown Publishing continued to be tied together into three imprint groups within Random House. The "trade" group includes the imprints Crown, Crown Archetype, Broadway Books, Hogarth, Three Rivers Press, and Tim Duggan Books. An illustrated and prescriptive nonfiction group comprises Clarkson Potter, Harmony Books, Rodale Books, and Ten Speed Press (which includes sub-imprints Lorena Jones Books and Watson-Guptill). A third group collects the business, conservative politics, and Christianity imprints Currency (formerly Doubleday/Crown Business), Crown Forum, Convergent, Image (formerly Doubleday Religion), Multnomah, and WaterBrook.

Former imprints of the Crown Publishing Group included Amphoto Books, Bell Tower Press, Orion Books (unconnected to Orion Publishing), Shaye Areheart, and some related subsidiaries like Gramercy Publishing Company. These have either been discontinued or transferred to other Random House units.
