= Judith Krantz's Till We Meet Again =

1989 television miniseries

- Created by: Judith Krantz (novel); Andrew Peter Marin
- Directed by: Charles Jarrott
- Starring: Courteney Cox; Mia Sara; Lucy Gutteridge; Hugh Grant; Michael York; Maxwell Caulfield; Barry Bostwick; Bruce Boxleitner
- Countries of origin: United Kingdom; United States
- Original language: English
- No. of episodes: 2

Production
- Running time: approx. 240 minutes
- Production companies: Steve Krantz Productions; Yorkshire Television

Original release
- Network: ITV; CBS
- Release: November 19 – November 21, 1989

Judith Krantz's Till We Meet Again is a 1989 two-episode television miniseries based on the 1988 Judith Krantz novel, Till We Meet Again. Its stars include Mia Sara, Bruce Boxleitner, Hugh Grant, Maxwell Caulfield, and Courteney Cox.

The story revolves around Eve, Delphine and Frederique (Freddy), three young women who are looking to get themselves set up in a world that changes quickly. Along the way they find romance and become swept up in war, danger and family intrigue. Events from 1913 to 1952 are included.

== Plot ==
=== Part 1 ===
The story starts in Dijon in 1913. Eve (Lucy Gutteridge) is the daughter of a prominent doctor, and is destined to be married off to Roger Grillont (James Langton), but instead she falls in love with a low-class theater performer, Alain Marais (Maxwell Caulfield). Alain believes that she is an orphan from the same social class as him, and loses his interest after finding out that she is a rich, privileged girl. Nevertheless, she follows him to live in Paris, where her neighbor Vivianne de Biron (Juliet Mills) helps her land a job as a showgirl. Alain disapproves of her profession, comparing it with prostitution, following which she leaves him.

By 1915 World War I is in full motion. Eve meets Paul de Lancel (Michael York) while performing for the army and falls in love with him. Paul's aristocratic family disapproves of Paul serving in the army, because it requires him to abandon his work at the Ministry of Foreign Affairs, as well as his duties as a husband to Laure (Susannah Harker) and their newborn son Bruno. Laure is devastated by Paul's absence and kills herself, after which her family swears revenge by keeping Bruno and raising him to hate his father. By 1917, Paul and Eve meet again in Paris and soon marry. She quits her career to support her husband's political career.

In 1930, Paul is stationed as a Consul General at the Consulate in Los Angeles. Here, their daughter Freddy (Elisabeth Harnois) starts getting flying lessons from stunt flyer Terrence 'Mac' McGuire (Barry Bostwick). By 1936, a now-teenaged Freddy (Courteney Cox) is an avid flyer and a tomboy. Her sister Delphine (Mia Sara), meanwhile, leads a reckless life with parties and alcohol. For the first time in their lives, they move to their home country of France to live with their grandparents at Chateau Valmont. They meet their half brother Bruno (Hugh Grant), who is now a political science student and a nazi sympathizer with a deep hatred for Paul. He reveals Eve's scandalous showgirl past to Freddy and Delphine.

In 1937, Freddy and Delphine return to Los Angeles. A stubborn Freddy accepts a stunt job from movie stunt coordinator Swede Castelli (Denis Arndt) and is kicked out of the house by her father. She moves in with Mac and starts a relationship with him despite a 23-year age gap. Delphine, meanwhile, is jailed for her reckless party behavior and is sent back to France to live with her grandparents. There, she finds work as a movie actress and falls in love with Jewish movie director Armand Sadowski (Charles Shaughnessy). Bruno warns her that Armand will have the same fate as Jewish Germans as soon as the war breaks out, but Delphine continues to see him.

One day Freddy prepares for a stunt scene that Mac considers too dangerous. He replaces her last-minute, crashes the plane and dies.

=== Part 2 ===
The year is 1940, and World War II is in full motion. Freddy is stationed as an Air Transport Auxiliary pilot in England and becomes good friends with co-pilot Jane Longbridge (Serena Gordon). She meets Jane's older brother Tony (John Vickery) and soon marries him and becomes pregnant. Unbeknownst to her, Tony's best man Jock Hampton (Bruce Boxleitner) is in love with her. Meanwhile, in France, Bruno takes over control of the chateau after the country surrenders to Germany and the family's vineyard becomes occupied by the German army. Bruno happily collaborates with German Captain Ruttemann. Delphine desperately tries to find Armand, who was taken prisoner in Dunkirk. Bruno helps her set up a meeting with a German official to gather information but the official makes sexual advances which she rejects. Bruno is enraged at her for disrespecting the German army and violently rapes her.

Soon after, Bruno sets up a champagne trading business with the German army and is spotted by Charles Martin, a loyal worker who has been with De Lancels for decades. Bruno shoots and kills Charles in cold blood in front of Charles' son Edward (Nick Wright). Armand, meanwhile, is assigned to do labor work at the vineyard in Chateau Valmont where Eve recognizes him. When it turns out he has no vineyard skills he is to be sent off to a concentration camp. He and other prisoners revolt and manage to escape with help from Eve. He flees to Paris where he is reunited with Delphine. Paul, who was previously stationed in England, now serves the army in France and sees his wife for the first time in years. He tells her that Freddy has given birth to a daughter in England. At the chateau Paul learns of Bruno's champagne trading business and orders him to leave the country. Bruno attempts to murder Paul but fails and leaves France.

After the war ends, Freddy moves back to Los Angeles, where she starts a business venture in aviation. She becomes a workaholic which comes at the cost of her marriage. Tony is unhappy and seeks comfort with alcohol and other women. Soon after he asks for a divorce and moves back to England. Jock, who is now working for Freddy, tells her that he has always loved her and was aware of Tony's adultery. Freddy feels betrayed that Jock never told her anything about the mistresses and runs off to fly a plane. The plane crashes and she is seriously injured. Following her recovery she sells the shares of her company.

In 1952 Paul dies of a heart attack. Bruno interrupts his funeral to spit on his grave. There Edward recognizes him as his father's killer. It also turns out that Bruno prepared a scheme that he would own the chateau after Paul's death, following which he kicks Eve, Freddy and Delphine out. Edward takes revenge on Bruno by shooting and killing him; Bruno's death is ruled as an accident. In the final scene Freddy, who was afraid to fly following her serious flying accident, conquers her fear of flying and kisses Jock.

== Cast ==
Actor	Role
Starring
Michael York	Paul de Lancel
Courteney Cox	Marie-Frederique "Freddy" de Lancel
Mia Sara	Delphine de Lancel
Lucy Gutteridge	Eve de Lancel
Hugh Grant	Bruno de Lancel
Charles Shaughnessy	Armand Sadowski
Maxwell Caulfield	Alain Marais
John Vickery	Anthony Alistair Wilmot "Tony" Longbridge
Barry Bostwick	Terrence "Mac" McGuire
Bruce Boxleitner	Jock Hampton
Also starring
Denis Arndt	Swede Castelli
Juliet Mills	Vivianne de Biron

== Ratings ==
Viewership and ratings per episode of Judith Krantz's Till We Meet Again
No.	Title	Air date	Timeslot (ET)	Rating/share (households)	Viewers (millions)	Ref(s)
1	"Part 1"	November 19, 1989	Sunday 9:00 p.m.	14.8/23	19.9	
2	"Part 2"	November 21, 1989	Tuesday 8:00 p.m.	11.7/18	16.1	
