= I'll Take Manhattan =

1986 novel by Judith Krantz

- First edition cover
- Author: Judith Krantz
- Language: English
- Publisher: Crown Publishers
- Publication date: April 20, 1986
- Publication place: United States
- Media type: Print (hardback and paperback)
- Pages: 437
- ISBN: 978-0-5175-6110-2

I'll Take Manhattan is a 1986 novel by American author Judith Krantz, originally published on April 20, 1986, by Crown Publishers. It has been described as Krantz's best novel because it is the one most closely rooted in her own experience as a writer and socialite.

In 1987, the novel was adapted into a CBS television miniseries of the same name.
