= Mistral's Daughter =

- Based on: Mistral's Daughter by Judith Krantz
- Screenplay by: Terence Feely; Rosemary Anne Sisson
- Directed by: Douglas Hickox; Kevin Connor
- Starring: Stefanie Powers; Stacy Keach; Lee Remick; Robert Urich; Timothy Dalton; Joanna Lumley; Stephanie Dunnam
- Theme music composer: Vladimir Cosma
- Country of origin: United States
- Original language: English
- No. of episodes: 8

Production
- Producers: Herbert Hirschman; Steve Krantz
- Editors: John Bloom; Barry Peters
- Running time: 390 minutes
- Production company: Steve Krantz Productions

Original release
- Network: CBS
- Release: September 24 – October 1, 1984

Mistral's Daughter is a 1984 American television miniseries, adapted from Judith Krantz's 1982 best-selling novel of the same name.

== Plot summary ==
In 1925, Jewish artist's model Maggy Lunel (Stefanie Powers) arrives in Paris and overcomes her shyness by posing nude for struggling artist Julien Mistral (Stacy Keach). She enrages the reigning artist model queen Kiki (Annie Jouzier) by replacing her as Montmartre's newest sensation. Paintings of her become an overnight success, and Mistral signs a contract with art dealer Adrien Avigdor (Ian Richardson). His business is arranged by wealthy American heiress Kate Browning (Lee Remick), who is in love with him. At an art gallery, Mistral sells a portrait of Maggy that he promised to her, prompting Maggy to leave him. Through good friend Paula Deslandes (Stéphane Audran) she is set up with banker Perry Kilkullen (Timothy Dalton). Meanwhile, Mistral realizes he has lost his muse and moves to Provence with Kate, where he finds new inspiration. Mistral and Kate marry.

Kilkullen is pressured by his lawyer to break off his affair with Maggy, because he is still married – though just on paper – to American Mary Jane (Alexandra Stewart). Kilkullen refuses, though, and unsuccessfully attempts to divorce Mary Jane when he finds out that Maggy is pregnant. By 1929, Maggy has given birth to an illegitimate child whom she calls Teddy. Stuck in America trying to get a divorce, Kilkullen invites Maggy and Teddy to live with him in New York City. Upon arrival, Maggy learns that Kilkullen has died in an accident. Broke, she attempts to sell her jewelry to Harry Klein (Shane Rimmer), who sets her up with dress designer Alberto Bianchi (Victor Spinetti). She climbs her way to the top in New York's fashion industry and befriends several of the city's elite, such as socialite Lally Longbridge (Joanna Lumley) and publisher Jason Darcy (Robert Urich). Meanwhile, Kate loses her entire fortune at the Wall Street crash of 1929, and relocates to New York in attempt to sell Mistral's work in a new environment. The exposition is a success, though the elite quickly realize that Maggy has posed nude for Mistral. Mary Jane convinces Bianchi that the scandal could badly influence his company, prompting him to fire Maggy. With the money that she earns from selling her jewelry, she starts her own modeling agency.

When World War II sweeps the world, Darcy is sent overseas and asks Maggy to elope before he leaves, but she rejects the idea. Kate moves into a house in Connecticut and tries to persuade Mistral and Avigdor to join her, but Mistral does not see any danger and is only invested in painting; Avigdor – who is Jewish – cannot leave his sick mother behind. Paula joins the resistance and promises to help Avigdor cross the border, but she is caught by the Nazis before she can. Nazi officer Schmidt (Wolf Kahler), who sympathizes with Mistral's work and therefore allows him to continue to work – sees portraits from Avigdor in Mistral's residence, and warns him not to help Jews. When all of Avigdor's friends are shot by the Nazis, he seeks refuge with Mistral, but Mistral refuses to help him in fear of being sent to a concentration camp as well. After the War, Kate moves back to France and gives birth to Mistral's daughter, Nadine. Back in America, Teddy (Stephanie Dunnam), now a young adult, has been kicked out of college for accompanying male Harvard students, and expresses her desire to become an artist's model as well. She is set up with photographer Melvin Allen Berg, whom she used to date, and they become romantically involved. She leaves him to go to France in order to pose for Mistral. Mistral is unsatisfied with his private life: he does not love Kate, he perceives his daughter Nadine as a mistake, and he flirts with other women in front of Kate, such as Nancy (Kristin Scott Thomas). He becomes infatuated with Teddy and courts her. When Teddy becomes pregnant, Mistral vows to leave Kate, but Kate refuses to grant him the divorce. Their daughter, Fauve, is considered illegitimate, and Teddy dies in a boating accident shortly after. Maggy takes Fauve to live with her in America.

Sixteen years later, Fauve (Philippine Leroy-Beaulieu) is sent to spend the summer with her father in Provence. He tries to help her with her painting skills, but she is more involved with dating Avigdor's son Eric (Pierre Malet) and reading about Jewish history and architecture. Fauve decides to remain in France to spend more time with Eric, much to Maggy's disdain. Mistral fears that Fauve will become estranged from him and decides to put her in his will (giving her one-third of his paintings) to keep her close. Kate is infuriated upon finding out and takes her revenge by telling Fauve about Mistral's collaborating actions during the War. She immediately leaves her father and returns to America, where she decides to work at her grandmother's company. Kate, who has found out a year previous that she was terminally ill, dies of lung cancer, and Mistral's health deteriorates as well. Nadine (Caroline Langrishe), who has felt neglected by him for most of her life, is assigned to take care of him, but she ignores her father's cry for help when he has an attack, causing him to die. Nadine is happy to finally get her hands on his will, and is furious when she finds out that Fauve is entitled to his most important pieces of work. Fauve travels to France and is introduced to Mistral's most impressive life work. Through a letter, she learns that Mistral has written a letter to the Synagogue in Cavaillon to beg for mercy. She rekindles her relationship with Eric and decides to follow her true passion of painting. The miniseries ends with Maggy accepting Darcy's marriage proposal.

== Cast ==
Actor	Role
Starring
Stefanie Powers	Magali 'Maggy' Lunel
Lee Remick	Katherine "Kate" Browning
Stacy Keach	Julien Mistral
Robert Urich	Jason Darcy
Timothy Dalton	Perry Kilkullen
Stéphane Audran	Paula Deslandes
Ian Richardson	Adrien Avigdor
Stephanie Dunnam	Theodora "Teddy" Lunel
Cotter Smith	Melvin "Falk" Allenberg
Pierre Malet	Eric Avigdor
Philippine Leroy-Beaulieu	Fauve Mistral
Also starring
Alexandra Stewart	Mary Jane Kilkullen
Joanna Lumley	Lally Longbridge
Caroline Langrishe	Nadine
Jonathan Hyde	Philippe

== Production ==
Catherine Deneuve was originally offered the lead, but rejected it.

By the time Pierre Malet joined the cast as Eric Avigdor, nobody was assigned to play Fauve yet. Malet suggested his girlfriend Philippine Leroy-Beaulieu, who thus assumed the role. She received $100,000 for the role.

The impressionistic paintings featured in the film were actually the work of John Bratby, a member of the English provincial realist artist group known as the Kitchen Sink school, founded by Bratby in the late 1950s.

The series' theme song, performed instrumentally for the series, was later released by Greek singer Nana Mouskouri, titled "Only Love". She also released a French version, "L'Amour en Héritage" and a German version, "Aber die Liebe bleibt". Of the latter, an alternative version under the title "Der wilde Wein" was also recorded. "Only Love" has since been covered multiple times and became a major hit for Norwegian artist Sissel in a Norwegian version, called "Kjærlighet".

Most of the production was filmed on location in France, over a period of 20 weeks. The entire production reportedly cost over $15 million.

== Reception ==
Judith Krantz praised Leroy-Beaulieu for her portrayal of Fauve, going as far as predicting that she would become a great star.

Reviewer of The New York Times praised Lee Remick for portraying Kate "to fresh-faced clawing perfection".

== Soundtrack ==
=== Charts ===
Chart (1985)	Peak position
Australia (Kent Music Report)	78
