= I'll Take Manhattan (miniseries) =

- Genre: Drama
- Directed by: Richard Michaels, Douglas Hickox
- Starring: Valerie Bertinelli; Barry Bostwick; Francesca Annis; Jane Kaczmarek; Jack Scalia; Perry King
- Theme music composer: Lee Holdridge
- Country of origin: United States
- No. of episodes: 4

Production
- Producer: Stanley Kallis
- Production locations: Toronto; Milton, Ontario
- Cinematography: Steven Poster; Larry Pizer
- Editors: Michael Brown; John C. Horger
- Running time: 375 minutes
- Production companies: I'll Take Manhattan Productions; Steve Krantz Productions

Original release
- Network: CBS
- Release: March 1 – March 22, 1987

I'll Take Manhattan is a four-part 1987 American television miniseries, adapted from Judith Krantz's 1986 novel of the same name. Screened by CBS, it tells the story of the wealthy Amberville family, who run their own publishing company in New York. After the death of the patriarch of the family, the company is taken over by his unscrupulous brother Cutter. Zachary's children, especially his energetic and intelligent daughter Maxi, begin a battle to regain control of their father's company.

I'll Take Manhattan was the highest-rated miniseries of the 1986–87 US television season with a 22.9/35 rating/share.

== Plot summary ==
=== Part 1 ===
In the late 1940s, Zachary 'Zach' Amberville (Barry Bostwick), a former World War II fighter pilot and now successful businessman, falls in love with his employee Nina Stern (Jane Kaczmarek). However, Nina prefers her career over marriage. Broken hearted, Zach leaves Manhattan for London, where he falls in love with aristocratic ballerina Lily Davina Adamsfield (Francesca Annis). After a failed audition, she agrees to marry Zach, and follows him to New York City. When Nina learns about this, she gets upset. Lily, meanwhile, settles as a housewife and gives birth to Zachary's child. She is worried that her ballet career is now nothing more than a hobby, and acts out by behaving as a spoiled rich wife, even being nicknamed 'The Ice Queen'. Her lack of interest in raising her children comes to notice with Zach, who feels that discipline is not the key factor in parenting. When their eldest son Toby (Tim Daly) is eight years old, he is diagnosed with retinitis pigmentosa, meaning that he will be blind one day.

At a formal party, Zachary runs into his younger brother Cutter (Perry King), who is both charismatic and immature. In the past, he did not contact the family unless he needed money and so Zachary is immediately wary of Cutter's arrival in town. Cutter himself, meanwhile, falls for Lily and they engage in a sexual relationship. Months later, Lily gives birth to Cutter's baby.

=== Part 2 ===
New York, 1960. Zachary and Lily have grown apart, encouraging Zachary to get back in touch with Nina. Nina is initially reluctant to reconcile with him, though soon falls for his charms and agrees to work for him, on condition that they have a baby. Elsewhere, Cutter has impregnated Lily again and is pushing her to have an abortion. Lily offers to divorce Zachary to be with him, but Cutter leaves her during a trip to San Francisco. In a letter to Lily, he claims to be scouting for a location for a better life, though he actually becomes intimate with a woman named Daphne. Lily feels betrayed and schemes her way back into Zachary's life by claiming to be pregnant with his child. Zachary, who believes her, abandons Nina to start another life with Lily.

In San Francisco, Cutter starts working as a broker and seduces the boss's daughter Candice Alexander (Lynne Griffin), a beautiful but shy woman. Her father Jonas (Walter Gotell) is opposed to the relationship, feeling that Cutter is only interested in Candice because she comes from money, and hires a private detective to gather evidence to prove this. Instead, Cutter assures a prominent part in her life by causing a horse accident that leaves Candice crippled: he marries her afterwards and manipulates Jonas into financially supporting them. Meanwhile, Lily gives birth to a son, whom she names Justin.

Ten years later, Zachary's magazine company grows into an empire, which saddens one of his loyal workers Pavka Meyer (Paul Hecht). His daughter Maxime 'Maxi' (Valerie Bertinelli) is now 17 years old and gets expelled from a strict all-girls school due to her rebellious behavior including skipping school to gamble with her friend India West (Julianne Moore). She starts working as a photographer at her father's company, in the department of Rocco Cipriani (Jack Scalia). She falls in love with him, and they soon have sex.

Cutter resumes his unfaithful behavior, and after an escapade with both Candice's sister Nanette (Kate Vernon) and Alice Chambers, he continues his affair with Lily, which Nanette and colleague Booker witness. Nanette informs her sister about Cutter's cheating behavior, causing Candice to get drunk and confront him. Cutter dismisses her claims, and states that Nanette has lied out of jealousy, before actually visiting Nanette to hit her. Nanette takes revenge by sending Candice pictures of Lily and Cutter having sex. Candice is heartbroken and commits suicide by jumping from her hotel room. The photos are then sent to Zachary, who is now aware of both his wife and brother's betrayal. Instead of leaving his wife, Zachary threatens to take the children and murder Cutter if she ever meets with his brother again.

In another sub-plot, Lily meets with Nina and claims that she did not trick Zachary into reconciling with her, leaving Nina to believe that Zachary did not want to be with her.

=== Part 3 ===
Moving to the present day, Maxi’s romance with Rocco blooms further. Maxi shares her excitement with India, as well as the news that she is pregnant with Rocco’s child. However, Maxi also reveals that she still hasn’t told Rocco that she is Zachary Amberville’s daughter. With the encouragement of Toby (who is now fully blind), Maxi reveals the news of her pregnancy to her parents and her desire to get married. In private, Lilly expresses her concerns about Maxi being too young to get married while Zachary says they shouldn’t stand in the way of their daughter’s happiness. Zachary and Lilly’s marriage, meanwhile, is still in a tense place after Lilly and Cutter’s affair. In return for Lilly keeping her promise to never see Cutter again, Zachary, in turn, promises to try not to hold what Lilly did over her.

Maxi meets with Rocco and tells him the truth about her pregnancy, her real age, and her real parentage. Despite being upset at Maxi not being truthful to him, he still happily agrees to marry her. The two get married in a lavish ceremony (despite Rocco’s hopes for a small ceremony.) Shortly afterward, Zachary and Lilly are in a restaurant when they spot Cutter for the first time since the affair was revealed. Zachary storms over to Cutter and warns him to stay away from his family. He also warns his brother that one day, people will know him the way Zachary does.

Maxi gives birth to a daughter which she names Angelica. At Lilly’s instance, Maxi hires a nanny to help with raising her. Maxi and Rocco’s marriage becomes rocky as the two fight over their lifestyle choices, Maxi’s disapproval of raising their family in Rocco’s meager apartment, and Rocco’s insistence that they do not always rely on Maxi’s family’s wealth. Finally, an argument about a baby stroller opens up the fact that Rocco and Maxi have different views on life, and the two separate and eventually divorce.

Visiting India on a movie set months later, Maxi ends up connecting with India’s co-star. The two sleep together and end up in a quick marriage that ends in a quick divorce.

Toby, despite his blindness, works as a head chef in a five-star restaurant. When he is almost killed in a kitchen fire, he laments to Maxi in the hospital that he has been in denial about the loss of his eyesight. The accident also causes a sense of guilt in Lilly and especially Zachary, who feels that he may have pushed Toby beyond his abilities. Talking alone with his son, Zachary tells Toby that while Toby needs to accept the limitations of blindness, he still shouldn’t give up taking risks and challenging himself within his limits.

The now-divorced Maxi takes Angelica on a whirlwind trip to Monte Carlo, where she meets a wealthy Australian businessman. In a case of déjà vu, Maxi ends up in another quick marriage that also quickly ends in divorce (Maxi’s third). Returning home, Maxi and India jokingly proclaim that they will both not deal with the headaches of marriage from that point. However, after getting some tough love from Toby regarding how irresponsible she has been acting with her life (echoing the tough love talk Maxi had given him after his near-fatal accident), Maxi realizes she needs to finally grow up for her daughter’s sake.

Meanwhile, Cutter tries to land a job with a high-profile firm. George Peterson, the head of the firm, hopes that hiring Cutter will be a way into business with the Amberville empire. However, when George speaks with Zachary about hiring Cutter. Zachary advises George not to hire his brother, calling him “bad news.” Peterson, in turn, tells Cutter that they can’t do business together. Zachary and Lilly have a tense discussion that night about Cutter, resulting in Zachary implying that their marriage may have to come to an end, as Zachary realizes he still can’t fully let go of Lilly and Cutter’s affair.

Zachary decides to fly alone to some property he owns in Canada to clear his mind. Before he leaves, he meets with Nina and apologizes to her for everything that happened between them. Declaring that he never stopped loving her, Zachary lets Nina know that when he returns, he wants to give their relationship another chance. The two have a passionate kiss before Zachary leaves, unaware that Cutter has spied on them from his car.

Following him to Canada, Cutter confronts Zachary when the two are each on horseback in the woods. Zachery admits that he persuaded the company not to hire Cutter. Out of angry spite, Cutter viciously throws his affair with Lilly in Zachary’s face, as well as the fact that Zach is raising the child (Justin) Cutter and Lilly conceived. The two men engage in a violent fistfight that ends with Cutter knocking his brother unconscious and then pushing him off a cliff.

Zachery is found barely alive by a search crew and taken to a hospital where Lilly and Maxi meet him, along with Cutter. Maxi sneaks in alone to see her semi-comatose father. Despite her pleas for him to get well, Zachary ends up dying of his injuries. Lilly and Maxi embrace in tears at the loss of the man they both loved.

Returning to a sequence that opened the miniseries, Maxi, Lilly, and Cutter attend a board meeting five months after Zachary’s death where it is revealed that Cutter will take over control of his late brother’s company. Maxi protests the decision when Cutter also reveals, to Maxi’s shock and horror, that he and Lilly have secretly married.

With India’s help, Maxi finds out about Cutter’s previous marriage to Candice and her resulting suicide. She confronts her uncle and threatens to blackmail him, accusing him of taking advantage of her mother’s vulnerable state when he married her. Realizing that the best way to take down her uncle is on the inside, Maxi agrees to not expose Cutter on the condition that Cutter gives her control of one of the magazines for a year. Specifically, Maxi wants to control the first magazine her father published, Buttons & Bows.

== Cast ==
| Actor | Role |
Starring
| Valerie Bertinelli | Maxime "Maxi" Amberville-Cipriani |
| Barry Bostwick | Zach Amberville |
| Francesca Annis | Lily Davina-Amberville |
| Jane Kaczmarek | Nina Stern |
| Jack Scalia | Rocco Cipriani |
| Paul Hecht | Pavka Meyer |
| Timothy Daly | Toby Amberville |
| Julianne Moore | India West |
| Adam Storke | Justin Amberville |
| Perry King | Cutter Amberville |
Also starring
| Ken Olin | Nat Lammerman |
| Kate Vernon | Nanette Alexander |
| Brett Cullen | Dennis Brady |
| Lynne Griffin | Candice Alexander |
| Georgia Slowe | Young Lily Davina |
| Adam LeFevre | "Jumbo" Booker |
| Doug Davidson | Male Model |
| Staci Love | Angelica Cipriani |
Special guest appearances by
| Barbara Barrie | Sarah Amberville |
| Fritz Weaver | Mr. Amberville |
Featuring
| Alisan Porter | Young Maxime "Maxi" Amberville |
| Keram Malicki-Sánchez | Young Justin Amberville |
| Hillary Wolf | Young Angelica Cipriani |
| Chris Noth | Fred Knox |
| Katharine Houghton | Pepper Delafield |
| Donald Trump | Himself |
