= Steve Krantz =

American film producer and writer

- Born: Stephen Falk Krantz; May 20, 1923; New York City, U.S.
- Died: January 4, 2007 (aged 83); Los Angeles, California, U.S.
- Education: Columbia University
- Occupations: Film producer, writer
- Known for: Krantz Films
- Spouse: Judith Krantz (m. 1954)
- Children: 2, including Tony Krantz

Stephen Falk Krantz (May 20, 1923 – January 4, 2007) was a film producer and writer, most active from 1966 to 1996. He set up his own production company, Krantz Films, in 1966 and ran it as its founding head until 1974.

== Career ==
Born in Brooklyn, New York City, Krantz graduated from Columbia University and went on to serve in the U.S. Army Air Forces in the Pacific during World War II as a second lieutenant.

He worked as a comedy writer for Milton Berle and Steve Allen. His later years were devoted to the production of animated cartoons in Canada. After firing Shamus Culhane from the animator's supervising director job on Rocket Robin Hood, director Ralph Bakshi and background artist Johnnie Vita were brought to Toronto, not knowing that Krantz and producer Al Guest were in the middle of a lawsuit.

Failing to reach a settlement with Guest, Krantz told Bakshi to grab the series' model sheets and return to the United States. When the studio found out, a warrant for Bakshi's arrest was issued by the Toronto police. Bakshi's animation studio, Bakshi Productions, took over Rocket Robin Hood and another Krantz Films–produced series, Spider-Man, beginning Krantz's working relationship with Bakshi.

By 1968, Krantz was producing live-action shows (such as the Canadian supernatural series Strange Paradise). Krantz agreed to produce Bakshi's animated film Heavy Traffic, but told Bakshi that Hollywood studio executives would be unwilling to fund the film because of its content and Bakshi's lack of film experience. Bakshi later pitched a film adaptation of Robert Crumb's comic strip Fritz the Cat, and Krantz sent Bakshi to San Francisco in an attempt to persuade Crumb to sign the contract. Krantz later acquired the film rights through Crumb's then-wife, Dana, who had Crumb's power of attorney and signed the contract. Fritz the Cat was released on April 12, 1972, opening in Hollywood and Washington, D.C. A major hit, it became the most successful independent animated feature of all time.

Towards the end of the year, Krantz began coproducing Heavy Traffic with Samuel Z. Arkoff, but Krantz had not compensated Bakshi for his work on Fritz the Cat, and halfway through the production of Heavy Traffic, Bakshi asked when he would be paid. Krantz responded, "The picture didn't make any money, Ralph. It's just a lot of noise." Bakshi found Krantz's claims dubious, as the producer had recently purchased a new BMW and a mansion in Beverly Hills. Bakshi soon accused Krantz of ripping him off, which the producer denied. When Bakshi attempted to work with Albert S. Ruddy on another film, Krantz locked Bakshi out of the studio and called several directors, including Chuck Jones, in search of a replacement. Arkoff threatened to withdraw his financial backing unless Krantz rehired Bakshi, which Krantz did a week later.

After 1974, live-action motion pictures dominated Krantz's filmography. He wrote two novels, including Laurel Canyon (Pocket Books, 1979, paperback original), which was a best-seller.

== Personal life ==
Krantz married magazine writer Judith Tarcher on February 19, 1954. In the mid-1970s, as Judith Krantz, she began her career as a best-selling novelist. Judith's first book, Scruples, was published in 1978, and reached number one on the New York Times bestseller list.

The couple had two sons, including film and television writer, director and producer Tony Krantz.

His sister-in-law (via his wife's brother) was puppeteer and ventriloquist Shari Lewis, famous for performing Lamb Chop. He was of Jewish faith.

== Death ==
He died in Los Angeles, California, on January 4, 2007, from complications of pneumonia, aged 83.
