= The Family Album =

Studio album by Rick Wakeman
- Released: 14 September 1987
- Genre: New-age
- Length: 47.55 (original vinyl), 58:51 (CD)
- Label: President
- Producer: Rick Wakeman

Rick Wakeman chronology
Country Airs (1986)	The Family Album (1987)	The Gospels (1987)

The Family Album is a new-age album by Rick Wakeman for which he recorded a song for every member of his family including his parents, pets and even his computer.

Years later, after divorcing his wife Nina and the passing of his parents, Wakeman has stated he no longer listens to this album as it brings him sadness. The original vinyl edition of the album only contained 12 tracks in a different running order. "Wiggles", "The Day After The Fair" and Mackintosh" were omitted.

== Track listing ==
Side one
No.	Title	Length
1.	"Nina (Rick's Wife)"	5:16
2.	"Adam (Rick's Second Eldest Son)"	2:43
3.	"Mum"	4:48
4.	"Chloe (German Shepherd)"	3:59
5.	"Oliver (Rick's Eldest Son)"	3:18
6.	"Kookie (Cat)"	3:52

Side two
No.	Title	Length
7.	"Black Beauty (Black Rabbit)"	3:43
8.	"Oscar (Rick And Nina's Son)"	5:02
9.	"Dad"	3:39
10.	"Tilly (Golden Retriever)"	4:44
11.	"Benjamin (Rick's Third Son)"	3:16
12.	"Jemma (Rick And Nina's Daughter)"	3:35

CD bonus tracks
No.	Title	Length
8.	"Wiggles (Black And White Rabbit)"	2:53
14.	"The Day After The Fair"	4:23
15.	"Mackintosh"	3:40

Note: The main melody for "Nina" was later used by Wakeman for "The Meeting", a song from the 1989 album Anderson Bruford Wakeman Howe.

== Personnel ==
- Rick Wakeman - keyboards

=== Production ===
- John Burns - engineer
