= Family Album (miniseries) =

- DVD cover
- Genre: Drama; Romance
- Based on: Family Album by Danielle Steel
- Screenplay by: Karol Ann Hoeffner
- Story by: Danielle Steel
- Directed by: Jack Bender
- Starring: Jaclyn Smith; Michael Ontkean; Joe Flanigan; Joel Gretsch; Brian Krause; Kristin Minter
- Music by: Lee Holdridge
- Country of origin: United States
- Original language: English
- No. of episodes: 2

Production
- Executive producer: Douglas S. Cramer
- Production locations: Greystone Park & Mansion; Los Angeles National Cemetery; 28124 Pacific Coast Hwy.
- Cinematography: Michael Watkins
- Editor: Mark Melnick
- Running time: 240 minutes
- Production company: NBC Productions (in association with) The Cramer Company

Original release
- Network: NBC
- Release: October 23 – October 24, 1994

Family Album, also known as Danielle Steel's Family Album, is a 1994 NBC television miniseries based on the 1985 novel of the same name by Danielle Steel. Directed by Jack Bender, it was broadcast in two parts on October 23 and 24, 1994. The drama centers on the life chronology of a Hollywood actress who becomes a successful film director in an era when directing was dominated by men.

== Plot ==
The film begins with Ward Thayer in his study, reminiscing about his life and family while perusing a photo album following the funeral of his wife, Faye Price Thayer. Flashing back to 1951, Faye Price is a famous Hollywood actress who, while entertaining the troops during the Korean War, falls in love with Ward Thayer, a rich heir. Seven years later, they are married, with four children. Ward loses his job and considers suicide, but Faye offers to start acting again. Originally, this upsets Ward, because he was not fond of moving to Fairfax, California. On the set of her new movie, the director and producer fight each other and the director eventually leaves the set. Faye offers to direct the scene herself. At first, nobody thinks she will be able to, but she turns out to direct the scene with a lot of success. She is soon offered directing jobs at television series, including Zane Grey Theater. Meanwhile, her home life is less fortunate. Ward has been depressed since going bankrupt and he has started an affair. When Faye finds out, she immediately kicks him out of the house. However, she soon agrees to give him another chance and they decide to work together on films as director and producer. Their film debut becomes a blockbuster success with positive reviews and she is contracted by Universal.

Years later, their children have grown up. Lionel is a student, hoping to be a photographer one day, Greg is still in school and wants to become a football player, Valerie is an actress waiting for her big break and Anne is the quiet youngest sister. Greg admits his grades aren't good enough and that he dropped out of school to join the marines and serve in Vietnam. Ward pays Lionel a surprise visit and discovers his son is gay. Faye is surprised, but accepts the news. Ward, however, is outraged and cuts him out of his life, while forbidding his daughters to ever contact him again. Anne is furious and decides to run away. Faye is devastated, but can't afford to quit her job and look for her. Greg prepares to leave for the service and the entire family comes together to say goodbye, but Ward refuses to speak to Lionel. Later, Faye receives a phone call from the police, informing her that Anne has been arrested for drug possession. Faye picks her up and is shocked to find out she is pregnant. Ward convinces her to try to make her give up her child. Anne is in tears after giving birth, but reluctantly agrees to give up the baby for adoption.

Tragedy reaches the Thayer family when it is announced that Greg died in Da Nang, only a few days before peace was declared. At the funeral, Ward finally acknowledges his now only son Lionel, but still has trouble accepting that he is gay. Meanwhile, Faye is nominated for an Oscar. Valerie is jealous of her mother's success and they get into a fight when she announces she dropped out of UCLA for the lead role in a cheap horror film, in which she is required to go nude. The Oscar nomination takes all of Faye's time. This makes Anne feel very neglected and she starts to hang out at her friend's place a lot. During this time, she bonds with the father of this family, Bill O'Hara, a windower who is the father of Anne's best friend. Faye forgives Ward and they reunite. During Easter holiday at their beach house, Lionel and his partner, John, arrive with egg-dying materials; Lionel admits his father invited them. Afterward, the Thayer family deal with another tragedy when Lionel and John get into a car accident. Lionel survives but John dies. He has trouble dealing with his loss and spends all his time working as a photographer.

Later, Anne upsets her parents by admitting she is dating the much older Bill. Ward is furious and confronts Bill with the fact he is seeing a 17-year-old girl. However, Anne and Bill are still determined to marry and it doesn't take long before she gets pregnant again. Meanwhile, Valerie finally gets her big break, when she is given the second lead role in her mother's newest film project. The lead player, George Waterson, at first treats her badly, because he thinks she is a horrible actress. However, she eventually wins his heart and they start a secret relationship. Lionel finds love as well with Paul Steel, a drug addicted actor who was recently fired. In the end, the movie directed by Faye and starring Valerie becomes a great success and Val enjoys her overnight stardom. Later, Anne gives birth to a son. The labor and baby reminds her of her first pregnancy and she blames her mother for having given up her first baby. Ten years later, Val makes Anne realize that Faye was actually a great mother, but didn't have a lot of time. Anne tries to apologize, but she is too afraid. Suddenly, Faye dies. Anne feels guilty for not having apologized, but Ward assures her that Faye knew how much she loved her.

== Differences between the film and the novel. ==
- In the novel, Valerie is one of a set of twins. In the film, she is a singleton.
- In the novel, Lionel's sweetheart John dies in a Christmas tree fire. In the film, he dies in a car crash.
- In the novel, Paul is Lionel's much-older first beau, with whom he ends up parting. Then, he falls in love with John. Then, sometime after John's death, he starts a relationship with a nice gentleman whose name is not given. In the film, John is Lionel's first sweetheart, then he meets and falls for Paul.
- In the novel, Bill's last name is Stein. In the film, it is O'Hara.

== Cast ==
- Jaclyn Smith as Faye Price Thayer
- Michael Ontkean as Ward Thayer
- Joe Flanigan as Lionel Thayer
- Kristin Minter as Valerie "Val" Thayer
- Leslie Horan as Anne Thayer / Anne O'Hara
- Brian Krause as Greg Thayer
- Tom Mason as Bill O'Hara
- Joel Gretsch as John
- Paul Satterfield as Paul Steel
- John Waters as Vincent

== Production and broadcast ==
Family Album was adapted by Karol Ann Hoeffner from the 1985 novel of the same name by Danielle Steel. Produced by Douglas S. Cramer and directed by Jack Bender, the four-hour miniseries was broadcast on NBC in two parts on October 23 and 24, 1994.

== Critical reception ==
David Hiltbrand of People wrote, "This hackneyed attempt to blend Hollywood glamor with family values is cosmetically appealing, but underneath that veneer crawl the worms of artifice, predictability and bad acting."

Michael Watkins was nominated for a Primetime Emmy Award for Outstanding Cinematography for a Miniseries or Movie in 1995 for Family Album.
