= Barry Bostwick =

American actor (born 1945)

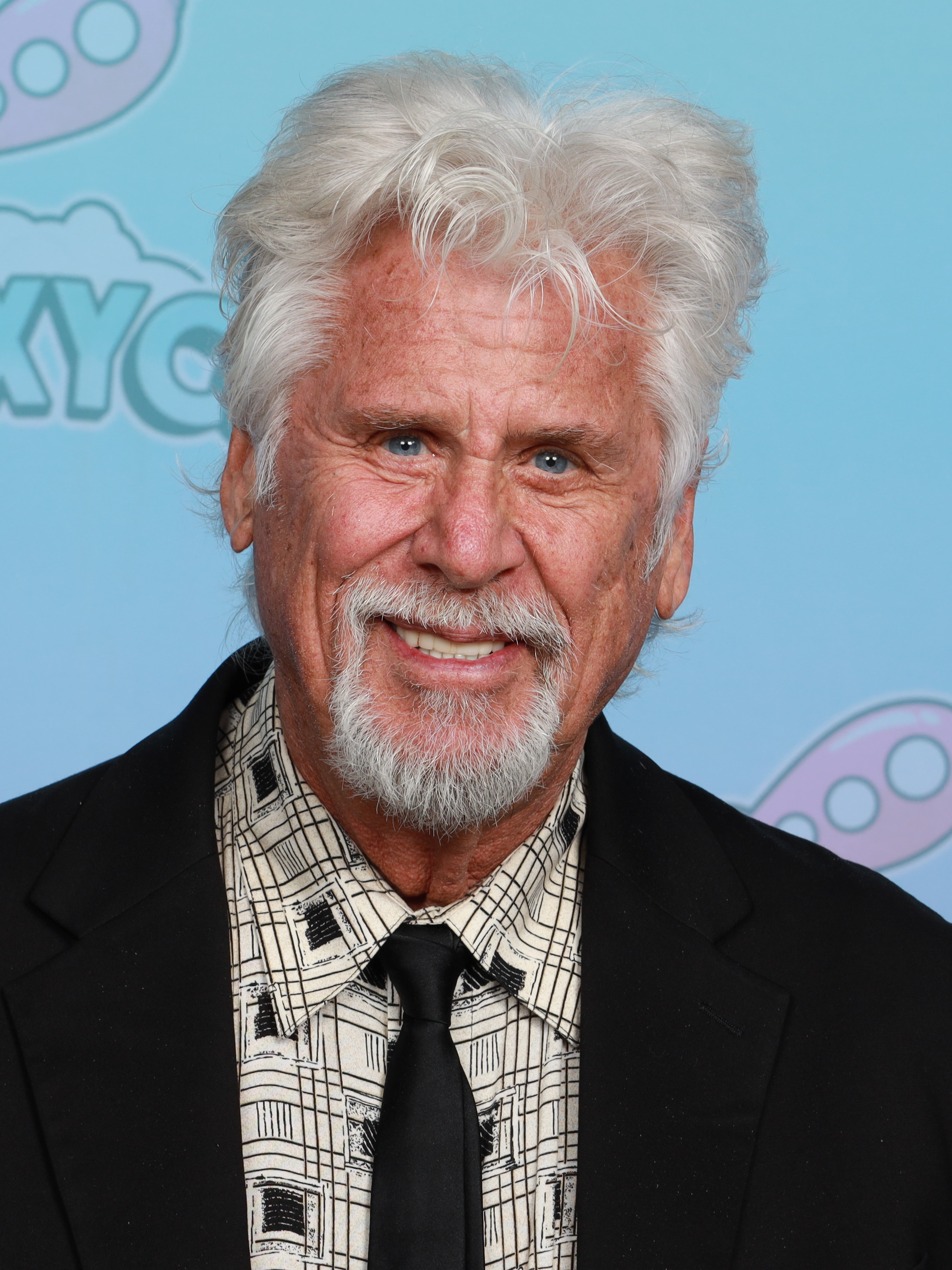
- Bostwick in 2025
- Born: Barry Knapp Bostwick; February 24, 1945 (age 81); San Mateo, California, U.S.
- Education: United States International University (BA); New York University (MFA)
- Occupation: Actor
- Years active: 1967–present
- Spouses: Stacey Nelkin (m. 1987; div. 1991); Sherri Jensen (m. 1993)
- Children: 2

Barry Knapp Bostwick (born February 24, 1945) is an American actor. He is best known for portraying Brad Majors in The Rocky Horror Picture Show (1975) and Mayor Randall Winston in the sitcom Spin City (1996–2002). Bostwick has also had considerable success in musical theatre, winning a Tony Award for his role in The Robber Bridegroom and performing the role of Danny Zuko in the original Broadway production of Grease.

== Early life, family and education ==
Bostwick was born February 24, 1945, in San Mateo, California. He is the son of Elizabeth "Betty" (née Defendorf), a housewife, and Henry "Bud" Bostwick, a city planner and actor. Barry's only sibling, older brother Henry "Pete" Bostwick, died at age 32 in a car accident on July 20, 1973.

Bostwick attended San Diego's United States International University in 1967, majoring in acting, got his start on the Hillbarn Theatre stage now located in Foster City, and worked for a time as a circus performer. He also attended NYU's Graduate Acting Program, graduating in 1968.

== Career ==
Bostwick was a member of First National Nothing, who released one album, 1970's If You Sit Real Still and Hold My Hand, You Will Hear Absolutely Nothing. The album describes them as "A rock-theater commune made up of musicians, actors, dancers, singers, designers, writers, composers, and friends that started a long, long time ago as a lost tribe in California and has ended up as a theatrical performing company in New York City."

In 1970, Bostwick was a member of a pop band called The Klowns, assembled and promoted by Ringling Bros. and Barnum & Bailey Circus, whose members performed wearing stylized clown makeup and costumes. Their sole album, released in 1970, was produced by Jeff Barry, and generated a minor Billboard hit single, "Lady Love."

Bostwick replaced C.C. Courtney in the musical Salvation. His next stage appearance was in the 1971 rock opera Soon, which closed after three performances. In 1972, Bostwick originated the role of bad boy Danny Zuko in the stage production of Grease, earning a Tony Award nomination for his performance. This was followed by a voice role as Terr in the English-dubbed version of Fantastic Planet in 1973. He starred with Tim Curry and Susan Sarandon in The Rocky Horror Picture Show (1975), portraying Brad Majors. He won a Tony Award for his performance in the 1977 musical The Robber Bridegroom. In 1981, Bostwick starred in the TV series adaptation of the 1978 film Foul Play, with his role modeled after Chevy Chase's. The following year, he starred in Megaforce. In 1984, Bostwick played George Washington in the CBS four-part miniseries on Washington's life. In 1986, he portrayed Washington again in the two-part sequel, George Washington - The Forging of a Nation.

Bostwick starred, along with Carl Weintraub, as Rick Armstrong in the short-lived ABC sitcom Dads during the 1986–87 season. From 1996 to 2002, Bostwick portrayed Randall Winston, the mayor of New York City in the sitcom Spin City opposite Michael J. Fox and his successor, Charlie Sheen. In 2006, Bostwick replaced Peter Scolari as Mr. Tyler, the father of Amanda Bynes's and Jennie Garth's lead characters, on What I Like About You.

Bostwick had a recurring role between 2004 and 2007 on Law & Order: Special Victims Unit. He has also had leading roles in various mini-series, including George Washington, its sequel George Washington II: The Forging of a Nation, Scruples, A Woman of Substance, War and Remembrance, and Till We Meet Again.

Bostwick served as host of the nationally televised annual A Capitol Fourth celebration on the National Mall in Washington, D.C. for eight years. Bostwick was also seen in a Pepsi Twist commercial. In the Cold Case episode "Creatures of the Night," in which he is the main suspect, the theme of the episode revolves around The Rocky Horror Picture Show, which is among his best-known performances to date.

In 2003, Bostwick appeared on Scrubs as a patient diagnosed with prostate cancer, a disease Bostwick had in real life. In 2008, he appeared in an episode of TV series Ugly Betty as an attorney to the Meade family. In 2007, Bostwick gained a recurring role, as Grandpa Clyde Flynn on the animated television series, Phineas and Ferb. Bostwick is also the spokesperson for Optimum Voice. In June 2009, he played Father Jimmy, the ineffective exorcist, in the independent horror comedy The Selling, written by Gabriel Diani and directed by Emily Lou.

Other television credits include guest appearances in Charlie's Angels, Hawaii Five-O, The Golden Palace, Grace Under Fire, and Las Vegas.

Bostwick was supposed to appear on the third season of Private Practice as "the Captain," a father of the Addison Montgomery character, but had to resign due to a scheduling conflict. In 2011, Bostwick portrayed a small-town sheriff in the John Landis–produced thriller Some Guy Who Kills People.

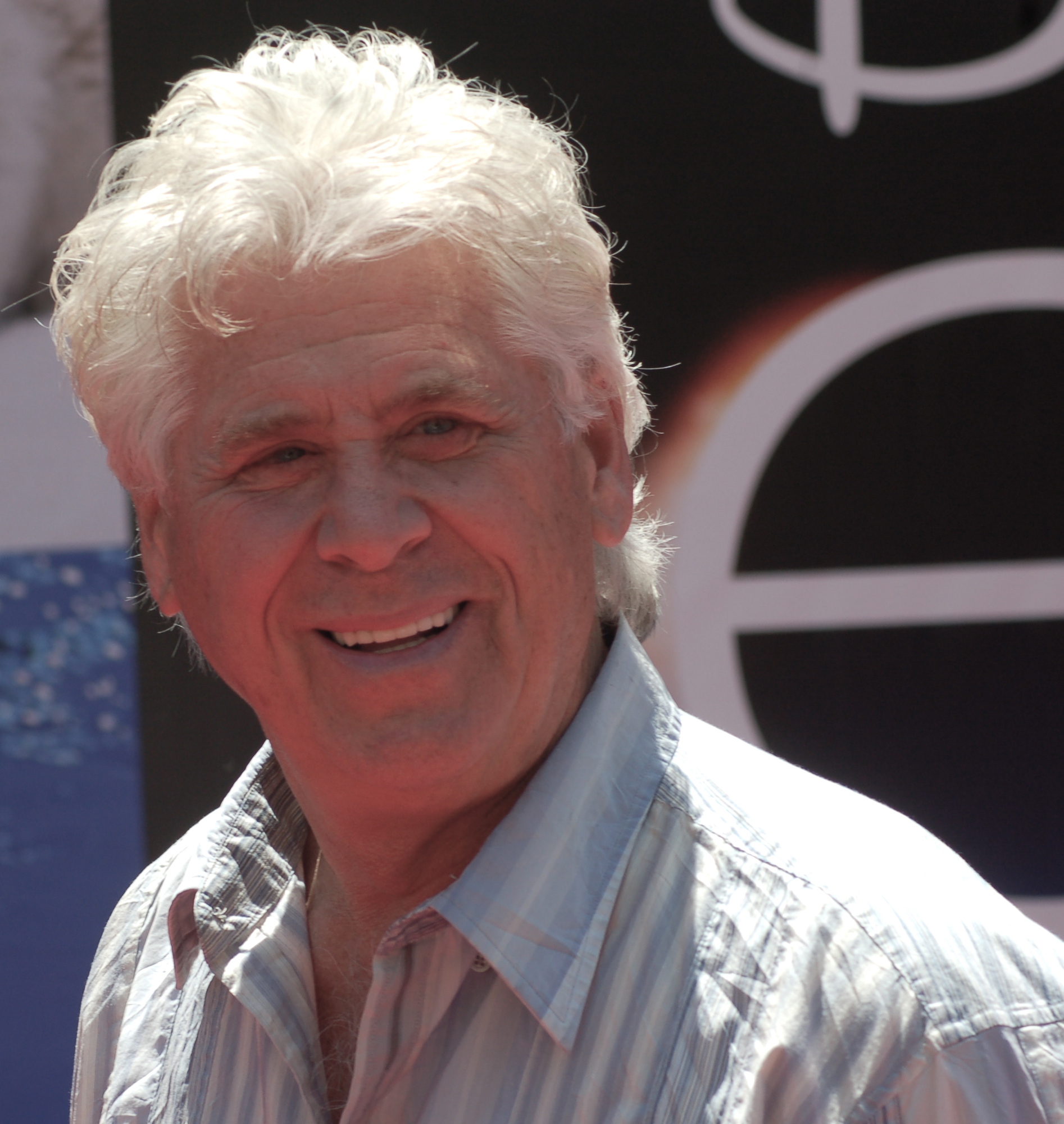
Bostwick at the premiere for Earth in 2009

In October 2010, Bostwick briefly appeared in the Rocky Horror-themed Glee episode.

From 2010 to 2014, Bostwick had a recurring role as Roger Frank on the sitcom Cougar Town which starred Courteney Cox. In season three of the show, Bostwick's character becomes mayor of the town the comedy is set in, Gulf Haven. In 2015, he portrayed Collin Winthrop, father of the Gig Harbor Killer, in the season-ending CSI: Crime Scene Investigation episode "The End Game." He has also had a return to cult musical horror films in the form of Terrance Zdunich's Alleluia! The Devil's Carnival, which is a sequel to the 2012 short film The Devil's Carnival, of which he was not previously a cast member, being a newcomer to the franchise. He starred in Darren Lynn Bousman's segment of the anthology film Tales of Halloween, which was his second time acting under Bousman after Alleluia! The Devil's Carnival, and appeared in the comedy horror film Helen Keller vs. Nightwolves.

In 2020, Bostwick executive produced and starred in the short film Molly Robber as Ron Baker; the film won an Audience Award at the 2020 Austin Film Festival and was an official selection at the 2021 Tribeca Film Festival.

== Personal life ==
Bostwick married Stacey Nelkin in 1987, and they were divorced in 1991. He married his second wife Sherri Ellen Jensen in 1993; they have two children.

In 1997, Bostwick was diagnosed with prostate cancer, and had his prostate removed in July of that year. In 2004, he won the Gilda Radner Courage Award from Roswell Park Comprehensive Cancer Center.

== Select filmography ==
=== Film ===
Year	Title	Role	Notes	Reference(s)
1971	Jennifer on My Mind	Minstrel #1		
1973	Fantastic Planet	Adult Terr / Fourth Draag Master / Draag	Voice, English version	
1974	Road Movie	Hank		
1975	The Wrong Damn Film	Alex Rounder		
1975	The Rocky Horror Picture Show	Brad Majors		
1978	Movie Movie	Johnny Danko / Dick Cummings		
1982	Megaforce	Commander Ace Hunter		
1990	The Greatest Adventure: Stories from the Bible	Joseph	Voice, episode: "Joseph and His Brothers"	
1993	Eight Hundred Leagues Down the Amazon	Garral		
1993	Weekend at Bernie's II	Arthur Hummel		
1994	In the Heat of Passion II: Unfaithful	Phillip		
1995	Project: Metalbeast	Miller	Direct-to-video	
1996	The Secret Agent Club	Vincent Scarletti		
1996	Spy Hard	Norm Coleman		
2003	101 Dalmatians II: Patch's London Adventure	Thunderbolt	Voice, direct-to-video	
2003	Swing	Freddie		
2004	The Skulls III	Nathan Lloyd		
2004	Chestnut: Hero of Central Park	Thomas Trundle		
2007	Nancy Drew	Dashiel Zachary Biedermeyer		
2007	Evening	Mr. Wittenborn		
2009	Hannah Montana: The Movie	Mr. Bradley		
2010	Miss Nobody	Father Grisham		
2010	Bedrooms	Roger		
2010	Moby Dick	Captain Ahab		
2010	It's a Dog Gone Tale: Destiny's Stand	Arlen Hanley		
2011	The Selling	Father Jimmy		
2012	Some Guy Who Kills People	Sheriff Walt Fuller		
2012	FDR: American Badass!	Franklin D. Roosevelt		
2013	Finding Joy	Alan		
2015	Alleluia! The Devil's Carnival	The Watchword		
2015	The Scorpion King 4: Quest for Power	Sorrell Raskov		
2015	Home Run Showdown	Big Al		
2016	The Land Before Time XIV: Journey of the Brave	Grandpa Longneck	Voice, direct-to-video	
2016	Range 15	President		
2016	Three Days in August	John		
2017	A Mermaid's Tale	Art	Direct-to-video	
2018	Incredibles 2	Mayor of New Urbem	Voice Cameo	
2018	Santa Girl	Santa Claus		
2019	Grand-Daddy Day Care	Dynamite Dan North		
2019	3 from Hell	Narrator		
2019	Undercover Brother 2	The Man		
2020	American Pie Presents: Girls' Rules	PeePaw		
2020	Molly Robber	Ron Baker	Short film	
2021	Single All the Way	Harold		
2022	In Search of Tomorrow	Himself	Documentary film	
2023	Outlaw Johnny Black	Tom Sheally		
2025	Love, Danielle	Bryce		

=== Television ===
Year	Title	Role	Notes	Reference(s)
1978	Charlie's Angels	Ted Machlin	Episode: "The Jade Trap"	
1979	Murder by Natural Causes	Gil Weston	Television film	
1979	You Can't Take It With You	Anthony Kirby Jr.	Television film	
1979	Hawaii Five-O	Lucas Sandover	Episode: "Year of the Horse"	
1980	Scruples	Spider Elliot	Television miniseries	
1981	Red Flag: The Ultimate Game	Maj. Jay Rivers	Television film	
1982	Working	Steelworker	American Playhouse production	
1983	Summer Girl	Gavin Shelburne	Television film	
1983	An Uncommon Love	Mr. Kinser	Television film	
1984	Saturday Night Live	Host	May 5, 1984	
1984	George Washington	George Washington	Television miniseries	
1985	A Woman of Substance	Major Paul McGill	Television miniseries	
1985	Deceptions	Grant Roberts	Television film	
1986	George Washington II: The Forging of a Nation	George Washington	Television film	
1986	Betrayed By Innocence	Nick DeLeon	Television film	
1987	I'll Take Manhattan	Zachary Amberville	Television miniseries	
1988	War and Remembrance	Lieutenant Carter "Lady" Aster	Television miniseries	
1988	Body of Evidence	Mark Dwyer	Television film	
1988	Addicted to His Love	Larry Hogan	Television film	
1989	Till We Meet Again	Terrence 'Mac' McGuire	Television miniseries	
1989	Parent Trap III	Jeffrey Wyatt	Television film	
1989	Parent Trap: Hawaiian Honeymoon	Jeffrey Wyatt	Television film	
1990	Aladdin	Genie of the Lamp / Genie of the Ring	Television film	
1990	Challenger	Comm. Francis R. Scobee	Television film	
1990	The Great Air Race	Roscoe Turner	Television miniseries	
1992	The Golden Palace	Nick DiCarlo	Episode: "Just a Gigolo"	
1993	The Last U-Boat	Captain Hawkins	Television film	
1993	Between Love and Hate	Justin Conrad	Television film	
1993	Praying Mantis	Don McAndrews	Television film	
1994	Once in a Lifetime	Dr. Matthew Dane	Television film	
1995	The Secretary	Eric Bradford	Television film	
1995	The Return of Hunter	Matt Sherry	Television film	
1995	Grace Under Fire	Professor Jack Drayson	Episode: "Mother & Son & Father Reunion"	
1995	High Society	Mark Finnegan	Episode: "Finnigan's Rainbow"	
1995	919 Fifth Avenue	Mr. Lawrence Van Degen	Television film	
1996–2002	Spin City	Mayor Randall Winston	Main role, 144 episodes	
1996	A Different Kind of Christmas	Frank Mallory	Television film	
1997	Lexx	Thodin	Episode: "I Worship His Shadow"	
1998	One Hot Summer Night	Art Brooks	Television film	
1998	The New Batman Adventures	Irv Kleinman	Voice, episode: "Mean Seasons"	
1999	Behind the Music	Himself	Episode: "The Rocky Horror Picture Show"	
2003	Scrubs	Mr. Randolph	Episode: "My Dirty Secret"	
2004–2007	Law & Order: Special Victims Unit	Oliver Gates	Recurring role, 5 episodes	
2005	Las Vegas	Martin	Episode: "Down and Dirty"	
2005	Cold Case	Roy Brigham Anthony	Episode: "Creatures of the Night"	
2005–2006	What I Like About You	Jack Tyler	2 episodes	
2007–2012	Phineas and Ferb	Grandpa Clyde Flynn	Voice, 8 episodes	
2007	Ugly Betty	Roger Adams	2 episodes	
2007	Love Is a Four Letter Word	Mr. Harper	Television film	
2008	Depth Charge	President Taylor	Television film	
2008	Holiday Baggage	Pete Murphy	Television film	
2009	Nip/Tuck	Roger Payne	Episode: "Don Hoberman"	
2009	Supernatural	The Amazing Jay	Episode: "Criss Angel is a Douchebag"	
2009	Ghost Whisperer	Don Sullivan	Episode: "Till Death Do Us Start"	
2009–2010	'Til Death	George Von Stuessen	2 episodes	
2010–2014	Cougar Town	Roger Frank	Recurring role (seasons 1–3), 8 episodes	
2010	Glee	Tim Stanwick	Episode: "The Rocky Horror Glee Show" (cameo)	
2010	Secrets of the Mountain	Henry Beecham	Television film	
2012	Hot in Cleveland	Hugh	Episode: "What's Behind the Door"	
2012	The New Normal	Marty Sawyer	Episode: "Pardon Me"	
2013	Blast Vegas	Sal	Television film	
2013	Teen Beach Movie	Big Poppa	Television film	
2013	Masters of Sex	Morris	Episode: "Brave New World"	
2013	Scandal	Fitzgerald "Jerry" Grant II	2 episodes	
2013	The Haunting Of	Himself	Episode: "The Haunting of Barry Bostwick"	
2013	Psych	Roland Armitage	Episode: "Psych: The Musical"	
2014	Enlisted	Russell	Episode: "Vets"	
2014	Franklin & Bash	Jacob "Falcon" Riley	Episode: "Falcon's Nest"	
2014	New Girl	Robert	Episode: "LAXmas"	
2015	CSI: Crime Scene Investigation	Collin Winthrop	Episode: "The End Game"	
2015	The Haunted Hathaways	Council Member #1	Episode: "Haunted Family"	
2015	Gigi Does It		Episode: "Love Thyself"	
2016	American Dad!	VanDouzen	Voice, episode: "The Life Aquatic with Steve Smith"	
2016	Childrens Hospital	Grandpa Richie	Episode: "Grandparents Day"	
2016–2017	Still the King	Coy Phisher	Recurring role, 9 episodes	
2016–2018	Girlfriends' Guide to Divorce	George McCarthy	Recurring role, 6 episodes	
2017	The Great Indoors	Mather	Episode: "The Explorers' Club"	
2017–2018	Milo Murphy's Law	Clyde Rickenbacker	Voice, 2 episodes	
2017	American Housewife	Thomas Otto	Episode: "Family Secrets"	
2017	Signed, Sealed, Delivered: Home Again	Bill Haywith	Television film	
2017	Tangled: The Series	Doctor St. Croix	Voice, episode: "Great Expotations"	
2017	Christmas in Mississippi	Mr. Kriss	Television film (Lifetime)	
2018	Will & Grace	Professor Jerry Wise	Episode: "Three Wise Men"	
2018	Signed, Sealed, Delivered: To the Altar	Bill Haywith	Television film	
2019	Christmas in Louisiana	Timothy Winter	Television film (Lifetime)	
2019	The Goldbergs	Professor Majors	Episode: "A 100% True Ghost Story"	
2021	Doogie Kameāloha, M.D.	Will	Episode: "Aloha - The Hello One"	

=== Stage productions ===
Year	Title	Role	Notes
1969	Cock-A-Doodle-Dandy	Porter, The Cock	Broadway debut
1969	Hamlet	Ghost, Osric, Player	
1970	House of Leather	Donny Brook	Closed after one night
1971	Soon	Kelly	
1972	Grease	Danny Zuko	Nominated – Tony Award for Best Actor in a Musical
1976	They Knew What They Wanted	Joe	Nominated – Tony Award for Best Featured Actor in a Play
1977	The Robber Bridegroom	Jamie Lockhart	Tony Award for Best Actor in a Musical
1981	The Pirates of Penzance	The Pirate King	
1991	Nick & Nora	Nick Charles	opposite Joanna Gleason
2014	Camelot	Merlin	

=== Video games ===
Year	Title	Role	Notes	Reference(s)
2018	Lego The Incredibles	Mayor	Voice role	
2022	Need for Speed Unbound	Holden Parker III	Voice role	

=== Web ===
Year	Title	Role	Notes
2013	Research.	Dr. Rust	
2015	Murder?	Barry Bostwick	
2015–2016	Inside the Extras Studio	Milt Hamilton	20 episodes
2018	The World According to Billy Potwin	Grandpa Davis	1 episode
2020	The Rocky Horror Show: Musical Livestream	Brad Majors	

== Awards and nominations ==
Year	Association	Category	Nominated work	Result
1972	Tony Awards	Best Actor in a Musical	Grease	Nominated
1976	Tony Awards	Best Featured Actor in a Play	They Knew What They Wanted	Nominated
1977	Drama Desk Awards	Outstanding Actor in a Musical	The Robber Bridegroom	Nominated
1977	Tony Awards	Best Actor in a Musical	The Robber Bridegroom	Won
1978	New York Film Critics Circle Awards	Best Supporting Actor	Movie Movie	Nominated
1979	National Society of Film Critics Awards	Best Supporting Actor	Movie Movie	Nominated
1989	Golden Globe Awards	Best Supporting Actor – Series, Miniseries or Television Film	War and Remembrance	Won
2013	Fangoria Chainsaw Awards	Best Supporting Actor	Some Guy Who Kills People	Nominated
