= Leo Janos =

American speechwriter and ghostwriter (1933–2008)

Leo Janos (1933 – 2008) was an American speechwriter and ghostwriter who was known for writing speeches for the President Lyndon Johnson. He authored and co-authored notable books including Skunk Works, Yeager: An Autobiography, and Crime of Passion.

In January 2008, he died at the age of 74 due to cancer.

== Career ==
In 1965, he became an editor of Ameryka magazine.

In 1966, he was selected by President Johnson as his speechwriter, a post he worked on until 1968.

His book, Skunk Works, has been reviewed by Kirkus Reviews.
