= Wanderlust (Steel novel) =

1986 novel by Danielle Steel

- First edition
- Author: Danielle Steel
- Language: English
- Genre: Romance novel
- Publisher: Delacorte Press
- Publication date: 1986
- Publication place: United States
- Media type: Print (hardback & paperback)
- ISBN: 0-385-29463-8
- OCLC: 12420441
- Dewey Decimal: 813/.54 19
- LC Class: PS3569.T33828 W3 1986

Wanderlust is a romance novel by American author Danielle Steel. The book was originally published on June 1, 1986, by Dell Publications, receiving a small number of both positive and negative editorial reviews. It is Steel's 20th novel.

== Plot ==
The plot follows Audrey Driscoll, who travels from America to China, Germany, England and North Africa. She is repeatedly made to choose between her desire for her adventure, or to abide by her conscience.
