= A Perfect Spy =

1986 novel by John le Carré

- First UK edition
- Author: John le Carré
- Cover artist: Howard J. Shaw
- Language: English
- Genre: Spy fiction
- Publisher: Hodder & Stoughton (UK); Alfred A. Knopf (US)
- Publication date: 17 March 1986
- Publication place: United Kingdom
- Media type: Print (hardback and paperback)
- Pages: 475 (hardback edition); 688 (paperback edition)
- ISBN: 0-394-55141-9 (hardback edition); 0671042750 (paperback edition)
- OCLC: 13093947
- Dewey Decimal: 823/.914 L456
- LC Class: PR6062.E33 L43 1986

A Perfect Spy (1986) is a novel by British author John le Carré about the mental and moral dissolution of a high-level intelligence officer. Major aspects of the novel are lifted from the life of the author, including the relationship between the protagonist, Magnus Pym, and his father Rick Pym.

== Plot overview ==
A Perfect Spy is the life story of Magnus Pym, a British intelligence officer and double agent. The book opens in Vienna where Magnus is ostensibly a diplomat and also a spy, living with his wife Mary who assists with diplomatic matters and their son Tom. After returning to England to attend his father's funeral, Pym mysteriously disappears. As his fellow intelligence officers frantically search for him it becomes clear that, throughout most of his career, Magnus worked as a spy for the Czechoslovak secret service. Although intrigue, wit, and suspense make up much of the novel, the story of Magnus Pym is partly an unadorned recollection of his childhood and memories of his father Rick Pym.

The non-linear narrative cuts back and forth between the present-day manhunt for Pym (being conducted by his mentor, boss, and longtime friend, Jack Brotherhood), and Pym's first-person reminiscences of his life as, in hiding at a seaside boarding house, he writes a memoir explaining to his family and friends why he betrayed his country. It incorporates flashbacks to Pym's childhood with his father, the enterprising charismatic rogue and con-man, Rick; to his early years at school and university; to his youthful love affairs; to his introduction to espionage and state secrets; and to his encounters with long-time friend and Czech spy Axel. The portraits reveal Pym as a man who for so long has manipulated his appearance to those closest to him that, in the end, he was unable to hold together the conflicting personae within him. The novel ends with Pym killing himself as police surround his safe house.

== Autobiographical aspects ==
A large part of the novel is a thinly disguised account of le Carré's own early life. Before he became a novelist, David Cornwell (John le Carré) was an intelligence officer for MI6, the British intelligence service, although there are no allegations that he ever betrayed his country and spied for another country like the character Magnus Pym. Like Magnus, le Carré lost his mother at an early age, was sent to an abusive prep school, studied languages at the University of Berne in Switzerland, in the 1950s worked for the Intelligence Corps of the British Army in Austria interrogating Czech defectors, and at the University of Oxford spied on far-left student groups for MI5, the British security service.

Rick Pym, the charismatic con man father of Magnus in the novel, is based on le Carré's father, Ronnie Cornwell. Ronnie was "an epic con man of little education, immense charm, extravagant tastes, but no social value", and associate of the Kray twins, London organised crime figures. He made and lost several fortunes through elaborate confidence schemes, and was jailed for insurance fraud. Le Carré's relationship with his father was troubled, and he has said:

"Although I've never been to a shrink, writing A Perfect Spy is probably what a very wise shrink would have advised me to do anyway."

== Literary significance ==
Matthew Bruccoli calls it "the book that is and may always be Le Carré's masterpiece". Philip Roth said it was "the best English novel since the war." David Denby, writing in 2014, agreed with Roth's view.

In a 1994 interview with The Paris Review, Le Carré said that The Perfect Spy was "the novel of mine that is closest to my heart."

== Adaptations ==
A 1987 TV adaptation of the same name was produced by the BBC starring Peter Egan.

In 1993, a BBC radio adaptation in eight parts by Rene Basilico was broadcast, with James Fox as Magnus Pym, James Grout as Jack Brotherhood, Brenda Bruce as Miss Dubber and Harriet Walter as Mary Pym.

In 2017, a radio adaptation of the same name was produced by BBC Scotland, directed by Bruce Young, starring Julian Rhind-Tutt, Bill Paterson, and Michael Maloney.

In an audiobook recording of le Carré reading aloud an abridged version of this book, he introduces the book as The Perfect Spy rather than A Perfect Spy.
