= Princess Daisy (novel) =

1980 novel by Judith Krantz

- First edition (US)
- Author: Judith Krantz
- Language: English
- Genre: Romance novel
- Publisher: Crown (US), Sidgwick & Jackson (UK)
- Publication date: 1980
- Publication place: United States
- Media type: Print (Hardback & Paperback)
- ISBN: 0-283-98647-6 (UK hardback edition)
- OCLC: 16497568

Princess Daisy is a 1980 novel by American author Judith Krantz.

== Plot summary ==
The novel tells the story of Princess Marguerite "Daisy" Alexandrovna Valensky. She is the daughter of Prince Alexander "Stash" Valensky, a wealthy Russian-born polo player and former playboy living in London, and his wife Francesca Vernon, a beautiful and talented American actress. Stash and Francesca, madly in love, are thrilled by her pregnancy and the news that she is carrying twins. However, a problem during delivery denies one of the twin girls, named Danielle by the doctor who delivered her, enough oxygen, and she is born brain-damaged, while Daisy is healthy. Francesca suffers from acute post-partum depression and enters a fugue state for several weeks. Stash, who has a fear and disgust of illness, disability and abnormality after a childhood spent watching his beloved mother slowly waste away from tuberculosis, is unable to accept or love Danielle, and cannot even bring himself to name her, leaving the doctor to name her after his own mother. When Francesca recovers from her depression, he lies to her, telling her that the second-born twin died soon after birth. She discovers the truth and flees with both infants to California, where she is helped by her former agent and his wife. For several years, she lives a secluded life in Carmel and grants Stash short visits with Daisy.

Francesca dies in a car accident, and Daisy and Dany are reunited with their father, who immediately places Dany in an expensive but remote home for disabled children, much to Daisy's distress. When Daisy turns 16, her father dies in a plane accident, after which her older half-brother, Ram, who has become obsessed with her, seduces and then brutally rapes her. To get her away from Ram, her father's mistress, Anabel (a mother figure to the girl), sends her to the University of California, Santa Cruz, where she forms what will be a lifelong friendship with Kiki Kavanaugh, an auto industry heiress from Grosse Pointe, Michigan. Because of Daisy's total estrangement from Ram, who is a trustee of her inheritance, she neglects to read his letters regarding her stock portfolio at a crucial moment and thus loses everything her father left her. As a result, she is forced to drop out of college and go to work. She paints portraits of rich, horse-mad people's children on ponies in order to pay Dany's bills and also works in a demanding job at a production company that makes television commercials.

When Anabel becomes ill and needs money for treatment, Daisy must make a decision to abandon her private life. Up to this point, Daisy has lived out of the public eye, refusing to trade on her title for financial gain, but she ultimately accepts an opportunity to do so, allowing her name to be used for a line of perfume and makeup, and starring in the commercials to promote them, for which she insists upon and is paid $1M. She meets Patrick Shannon, the CEO of the company who creates the Princess Daisy line of cosmetics and perfume, and they fall in love. Ram, who learns of their relationship, is enraged and goes to a tabloid and reveals the secret existence of Danielle to ruin Daisy. He then commits suicide in despair. Through these events, Daisy learns to trust Shannon, comes to terms with her sister's disability, and makes peace with the life she has been given.

== Reception ==
The book hit number one a week before publication on The New York Times Best Seller List. Rights to the paperback edition were sold for $3.2 million, the highest price ever paid for a fiction reprint at that time. The book received a scathing review by Clive James.

== Adaptation ==
Princess Daisy was adapted into a 1983 miniseries of the same name.
