= Family Album (novel) =

1985 novel by Danielle Steel

- First edition
- Author: Danielle Steel
- Language: English
- Genre: Romance novel; Drama
- Publisher: Delacorte Press
- Publication date: 1985
- Publication place: United States
- Media type: Print (hardcover & paperback)
- ISBN: 0-385-29392-5

Family Album is a 1985 romance novel by American Danielle Steel. It was adapted into a 1994 TV miniseries starring Jaclyn Smith. It is Steel's eighteenth novel.

== Plot ==
Family Album tells the story of Faye Price (later Thayer), since World War II to her death in present day. It relates her professional life as an actress in Hollywood's golden era to finally becoming one of the first female directors in Hollywood. But more important to her is her family life, from her marriage, the birth of her children, separations and reconciliations with her husband, the struggles to raise her children, and the problems they go through once grown up until, in the end, they come through stronger from the ordeal.

== Adaptation ==
Family Album was adapted by Karol Ann Hoeffner into a 1994 NBC television miniseries starring Jaclyn Smith as Faye and Michael Ontkean as Ward. Though the plot was simplified from the original novel, it retains the basic story.
