= Judith Krantz =

American writer (1928–2019)

- Born: Judith Bluma-Gittel Tarcher; January 9, 1928; New York City, U.S.
- Died: June 22, 2019 (aged 91); Los Angeles, California, U.S.
- Education: Wellesley College
- Occupation: Novelist
- Spouse: Steve Krantz (m. 1954; died 2007)
- Children: 2, including Tony Krantz
- Relatives: Mallory Lewis (niece)

Judith Krantz (née Tarcher; January 9, 1928 – June 22, 2019) was an American magazine writer, fashion editor, and novelist. Her first novel Scruples (1978) was a New York Times best-seller and was translated into 50 languages. Scruples, which describes the glamorous and affluent world of high fashion in Beverly Hills, California, helped define a new sub-genre of the romance novel — the bonkbuster or "sex-and-shopping" novel. She also became a "celebrity author" through her extensive touring and promotion. Her later books included Princess Daisy (1980), Mistral's Daughter (1982) Till We Meet Again (1988), Dazzle (1990), and Spring Collection (1996). Her autobiography, Sex and Shopping: The Confessions of a Nice Jewish Girl, was published in 2000.

== Biography ==
=== Early years ===
Judith Bluma-Gittel Tarcher was born on January 9, 1928, in New York City, the daughter of Mary (Braeger), a Lithuanian-born attorney, and Jack D. Tarcher, an advertising executive. Her family was Jewish. The "youngest, smartest, and shortest girl" in her year, she graduated from the Birch Wathen School at age 16. Krantz then enrolled at Wellesley College.

Krantz told The Boston Globe in 1982 that she attended Wellesley with three goals: to date, to read every novel in the library, and to graduate. "Torchy", as her dormmates named her, held the dorm dating record as the only one to have 13 consecutive dates with 13 different men. Her grades were not as impressive as her extracurricular activities. Krantz earned one A-plus in English, but had a B− average in her major and C average in everything else. Krantz had the opportunity to improve her marks when she took a short-story class during her sophomore year. Although the professor enjoyed her writing, he refused to give her an A because she had poor spelling, and he thought the B would teach her a lesson. Krantz claims to have learned the lesson well—she did not write fiction again for 31 years.

After graduating from Wellesley in 1948, Krantz moved to Paris, where she worked in fashion public relations. She enjoyed attending elegant parties, borrowing couture gowns, and meeting prominent people such as Marlene Dietrich, Orson Welles and Hubert de Givenchy.

==== Magazines ====
The following year, Krantz returned to New York City, where began a career in magazine journalism. She worked in the fiction department at Good Housekeeping before being promoted to fashion editor and having the opportunity to write several articles for the magazine.

In 1953 Krantz attended a Fourth of July party hosted by her high school friend, Barbara Walters. There she met the future film and television producer Steve Krantz. The two were married the following year, on February 19, 1954. Three years later, she gave birth to their first son, and she gave up her full-time job, choosing instead to write part-time from home. She wrote many freelance articles for Maclean's, McCall's, Ladies' Home Journal, and Cosmopolitan. Her best-known article was "The Myth of the Multiple Orgasm", which was published in Cosmopolitan. Her magazine career gave Krantz an opportunity to interview many prominent women.

=== Novels ===
In 1976, Krantz's husband decided to take flying lessons. Despite Krantz having a fear of flying, she joined the flying lessons with him, after which her fears were subdued. Subsequently, she wrote fiction for the first time since college. Although her husband had been insisting for years that she was a natural storyteller, Krantz believed that she was writing the book simply to prove to him that she was not able to write good fiction.

She completed her first novel, Scruples, nine months later. The year it was published, 1978, Krantz turned 50. The books were not copyrighted under her own name but by Steve Krantz Productions. Scruples reached the number one spot on The New York Times bestseller list. There were two sequels: Scruples Two (1992) and Lovers (1994).

Her second novel, Princess Daisy, followed in 1980 and netted her $5 million before its publication. It also became a number one best seller, with the paperback rights selling for a then-record $3.2 million. It concerns the fabulously wealthy and glamorous Daisy, daughter of a Russian prince, who has to confront and overcome many harsh realities. The book is notable for having received one of the most scathing reviews ever written, by Clive James. Krantz continued her run of success with Mistral's Daughter (1982) (a multi-generational saga) and I'll Take Manhattan (1986), (about writer and socialite Maxi Amberville, a thinly disguised portrait of the author). Mistral's Daughter went beyond the formula (with only four sex scenes, all at the beginning of the book), delving into women's empowerment, art, Jewish spirituality, and the persecution of Jewish people in France during World War II. Till We Meet Again (1988) which starts in the music halls of 1910s Paris and continues on until after the Second World War, was the last to make the annual top ten bestseller lists, though the later novels continued to be popular.

Spring Collection (1996) returns to the world of fashion, while The Jewels of Tessa Kent (1998) explores mother-daughter relationships; Krantz reportedly had a difficult relationship with her own mother. She retired from writing that year at the age of 70, saying she had nothing left to say to her readers. Over 80 million copies of her books are in print in over 50 languages. Seven of her novels have also been adapted for television (as either films or mini-series), with her husband having served as executive producer for some of them. She also wrote one original mini-series for television, Judith Krantz's "Secrets", in 1992.

=== Family ===
Krantz served on the advisory board of Compassion & Choices, an organization dedicated to providing choices for the dying. In 2006, she joined the Board of the Los Angeles Music Center.

Krantz's husband, Steve Krantz, died in 2007 of pneumonia. The couple had two sons, Tony Krantz and Nicholas Krantz, both of whom reside in the Los Angeles area. Krantz was the sister-in-law of children's entertainer and television host Shari Lewis, who was married to Krantz's brother, Jeremy P. Tarcher, publisher of nonfiction books on health, psychology and New Age spirituality. Jeremy's daughter, Krantz's niece, is entertainer Mallory Lewis. Krantz has two grandchildren, Michael Krantz and Kate Krantz.

=== Death ===
Krantz died on June 22, 2019, at her home in the Bel Air neighborhood of Los Angeles.

== Works ==
=== Novels ===
- Scruples (1978) (adapted as a 1980 miniseries)
- Princess Daisy (1980) (adapted as a 1983 miniseries)
- Mistral's Daughter (1982) (adapted as a 1984 miniseries)
- I'll Take Manhattan (1986) (adapted as a 1987 miniseries)
- Till We Meet Again (1988) (adapted as a 1989 miniseries)
- Dazzle (1990) (adapted as a 1995 miniseries)
- Scruples Two (1992)
- Lovers (1994)
- Spring Collection (1996)
- The Jewels of Tessa Kent (1998)

=== Non-fiction ===
- Sex and Shopping: The Confessions of a Nice Jewish Girl (2000) (autobiography)

=== Original television work ===
- Judith Krantz's "Secrets" (1992 TV 65-episode serialized drama; only shown internationally; not based on a source novel)
- Torch Song (1993) (adapted as a 1993 made-for-TV movie)
