= Bibliography of Ronald Reagan =

The bibliography of Ronald Reagan includes numerous books and articles about Ronald Reagan. According to J. David Woodard, a political science professor, more than 11,000 books on Reagan have been published.

== Biographies ==
- Boot, Max. Reagan: His Life and Legend (2024)
- Brands, H.W. Reagan: The Life (2015)
- Hayward, Steven F. The Age of Reagan: The Conservative Counterrevolution, 1980–1989 (2010)
- Hayward, Steven F. The Age of Reagan: The Fall of the Old Liberal Order, 1964–1980 (2001)
- Benze, James G. Jr. Nancy Reagan: On the White House Stage (2005)
- Burgan, Michael. Ronald Reagan (DK Biography, 2010)
- Cannon, Lou. President Reagan: The Role of a Lifetime (1991)
- Cannon, Lou. Governor Reagan: His Rise to Power (2003)
- D’Souza, Dinesh. Ronald Reagan: How An Ordinary Man Became an Extraordinary Leader (1997)
- Evans, Thomas W. The Education of Ronald Reagan: The General Electric Years (2006)
- Kleinknecht, William. The Man Who Sold the World: Ronald Reagan and the Betrayal of Main Street America (2009)
- Mann, Robert. Becoming Ronald Reagan: The Rise of a Conservative Icon (2019)
- Morris, Edmund. Dutch: A Memoir of Ronald Reagan (1999)
- Pemberton, William E. Exit with Honor: The Life and Presidency of Ronald Reagan (1998)
- Reeves, Richard. President Reagan: The Triumph of Imagination (2005)
- Roberts, Jason. "Nancy Reagan." in Katherine A.S. Sibley, ed., A Companion to First Ladies (2016)
- Spitz, Bob. Reagan: An American Journey (2018)
- Sullivan, George. Mr. President (1997)

== Politics and domestic issues ==
- Aldrich, John H., and David W. Rohde. Change and Continuity in the 1984 Elections (1987)
- Brandt, Karl Gerard. Ronald Reagan and the House Democrats: Gridlock, Partisanship, and the Fiscal Crisis (University of Missouri Press, 2009).
- Congressional Quarterly. Congress and the Nation, 1981–1984 (1985); 1162 pp. highly detailed coverage of all major issues based on CQ Weekly Report; Congress and the Nation, 1985–1989 (1990); 1194 pp. highly detailed coverage of all major issues
- Crafton, William. "The Incremental Revolution: Ronald Reagan and Welfare Reform in the 1970s," Journal of Policy History (2014) 26#1 pp. 27–47. online
- Cunningham, Sean P. Cowboy Conservatism: Texas and the Rise of the Modern Right (2010).
- Berman, Larry, ed. Looking Back on the Reagan Presidency (1990), essays by academics
- Brinkley, Alan and Davis Dyer. The American Presidency (2004)
- Brownlee, W. Elliot and Hugh Davis Graham, eds. The Reagan Presidency: Pragmatic Conservatism and Its Legacies (2003)
- Bunch, Will. Tear Down This Myth: How the Reagan Legacy Has Distorted Our Politics and Haunts Our Future (2009). Review and excerpt.
- Busch, Andrew E. Reagan's Victory: The Presidential Election of 1980 and the Rise of the Right, (2005) online review by Michael Barone
- Campagna; Anthony S. The Economy in the Reagan Years: The Economic Consequences of the Reagan Administrations Greenwood Press. 1994
- Cannon, Lou. Ronald Reagan: The Presidential Portfolio. Public Affairs. ISBN
- Collins, Chuck, Felice Yeskel, and United for a Fair Economy. "Economic Apartheid in America: A Primer on Economic Inequality and Insecurity." (2000). on tax policies.
- Cook, Daniel M. and Polsky, Andrew J. "Political Time Reconsidered: Unbuilding and Rebuilding the State under the Reagan Administration." American Politics Research(4): 577–605. ISSN 1532-673X Fulltext in SwetsWise. Argues Reagan slowed enforcement of pollution laws and transformed the national education agenda.
- Dallek, Matthew. The Right Moment: Ronald Reagan's First Victory and the Decisive Turning Point in American Politics. (2004). Study of 1966 election as governor.
- Ehrman, John. The Eighties: America in the Age of Reagan. (2005)
- Ferguson Thomas, and Joel Rogers, Right Turn: The Decline of the Democrats and the Future of American Politics 1986.
- Germond, Jack W. and Jules Witcover. Blue Smoke & Mirrors: How Reagan Won & Why Carter Lost the Election of 1980. 1981. Detailed journalism.
- Greenstein Fred I. ed. The Reagan Presidency: An Early Assessment 1983, essays by political scientists
- Hayward, Steven F. The Age of Reagan, 1964–1980: The Fall of the Old Liberal Order (2001) vol 1; The Age of Reagan: The Conservative Counterrevolution: 1980–1989 (2009) vol 2; the most comprehensive coverage of the era from a Reaganite perspective
- Johnson, Haynes. Sleepwalking through History: America in the Reagan Years (1991); hostile
- Jones, Charles O. ed. The Reagan Legacy: Promise and Performance (1988) essays by political scientists
- Kirst Michael W. "Coalition Building For School Finance Reform: The Case of California" Journal of Education Finance 4#1 (1978), pp. 29–45 online
- Levy, Peter B. Encyclopedia of the Reagan-Bush Years (1996), short articles
- Patterson, James T. Restless Giant: The United States from Watergate to Bush vs. Gore. (2005), standard scholarly synthesis.
- Perlstein, Rick. Reaganland: America's Right Turn, 1976–1980. (2020).
- Rossinow, Doug. The Reagan Era: A History of the 1980s (2015).
- Salamon Lester M., and Michael S. Lund. eds. The Reagan Presidency and the Governing of America 1985. articles by political scientists
- Schmertz, Eric J. et al. eds. Ronald Reagan's America 2 Volumes (1997) articles by scholars and officeholders
- Short, C. Brant. Ronald Reagan and the Public Lands: America's Conservation Debate, 1979-1984 (Texas A&M UP, 2000)
- Stine, Jeffrey K. "Natural Resources and Environmental Policy." in The Reagan. Presidency: Pragmatic Conservatism and Its Legacies (2003) pp. 233–256.
- Weatherford, M. Stephen and Mcdonnell, Lorraine M. "Ronald Reagan as Legislative Advocate: Passing the Reagan Revolution's Budgets in 1981 and 1982." Congress & the Presidency (1): 1–29. Fulltext in Ebsco; Argues RR ignored the details but played a guiding role in setting major policies and adjudicating significant trade-offs, and in securing Congressional approval.

== Foreign affairs ==
- Aldous, Richard. Reagan and Thatcher: The Difficult Relationship (2012), on relations with Britain
- Andrew, Christopher. For the President's Eyes Only: Secret Intelligence and the American Presidency from Washington to Bush (1996) pp 457–502.
- Arnson, Cynthia J. Crossroads: Congress, the Reagan Administration, and Central America Pantheon, 1989
- Avner, Yehuda, The Prime Ministers: An Intimate Narrative of Israeli Leadership (The Toby Press, 2010). ISBN 978-1-59264-278-6
- Baier, Brett and Catherine Whitney. Three Days in Moscow: Ronald Reagan and the Fall of the Soviet Empire (William Morrow, 2018).
- Busch, Andrew E.; "Ronald Reagan and the Defeat of the Soviet Empire" in Presidential Studies Quarterly. Vol: 27. Issue: 3. 1997. pp. 451+
- Dobson, Alan P. "The Reagan Administration, Economic Warfare, and Starting to Close down the Cold War." Diplomatic History (3): 531–56. online. Argues Reagan's public rhetoric against the USSR was harsh and uncompromising, giving rise to the idea that his administration sought to employ a US defense buildup and NATO economic sanctions to bring about the collapse of the USSR. Yet many statements by Reagan and Shultz suggest they desired negotiation with the Soviets from a position of American strength, not the eventual demise of the USSR.
- Dujmovic, Nicholas. "Reagan, Intelligence, Casey, and the CIA: A Reappraisal," International Journal of Intelligence & Counterintelligence (2013) 26#1 pp. 1–30.
- Draper, Theodore. A Very Thin Line: The Iran-Contra Affair (1991)
- Fitzgerald, Frances. Way Out There in the Blue: Reagan, Star Wars and the End of the Cold War. political history of S.D.I. (2000). ISBN.
- Ford, Christopher A. and Rosenberg, David A. "The Naval Intelligence Underpinnings of Reagan's Maritime Strategy." Journal of Strategic Studies (2): 379–409. Fulltext in Ingenta and Ebsco; Reagan's maritime strategy sought to apply US naval might against Soviet vulnerabilities on its maritime flanks. It was supported by a major buildup of US naval forces and aggressive exercising in seas proximate to the USSR; it explicitly targeted Moscow's strategic missile submarines with the aim of pressuring the Kremlin during crises or the early phases of global war. The maritime strategy represents one of the rare instances in history when intelligence helped lead a nation to completely revise its concept of military operations.
- Haftendorn, Helga and Jakob Schissler, eds. The Reagan Administration: A Reconstruction of American Strength? Berlin: Walter de Guyer, 1988. by European scholars
- Inboden, William (2022). The Peacemaker: Ronald Reagan, the Cold War, and the World on the Brink. Dutton. ISBN 978-1-5247-4589-9. two scholarly book reviews online
- Kengor, Paul (2006). The Crusader. New York: Regan Books. ISBN 978-0-06-113690-0.
- Jeffrey W. Knopf, "Did Reagan Win the Cold War?" Strategic Insights, Volume III, Issue 8 (August 2004)
- Kyvig, David. ed. Reagan and the World (1990), scholarly essays on foreign policy
- Mann, James. The Rebellion of Ronald Reagan: A History of the End of the Cold War (Penguin, 2010)
- Pach, Chester. "The Reagan Doctrine: Principle, Pragmatism, and Policy." Presidential Studies Quarterly(1): 75–88. Fulltext in SwetsWise and Ingenta; Reagan declared in 1985 that the U.S. should not "break faith" with anti-Communist resistance groups. However, his policies varied as differences in local conditions and US security interests produced divergent policies toward "freedom fighters" in Afghanistan, Nicaragua, Mozambique, Angola, and Cambodia.
- Ratnesar, Romesh. "Tear Down This Wall: A City, a President, and the Speech that Ended the Cold War" (2009)
- Salla; Michael E. and Ralph Summy, eds. Why the Cold War Ended: A Range of Interpretations Greenwood Press. 1995.
- Schmertz, Eric J. et al. eds. Ronald Reagan and the World (1997) articles by scholars and officeholders.
- Shultz, George P. Turmoil and Triumph My Years As Secretary of State (1993), detailed autobiography
- Schweizer, Peter. Reagan's War: The Epic Story of His Forty Year Struggle and Final Triumph Over Communism (2002)
- Velasco, Jesús. Neoconservatives in U.S. Foreign Policy under Ronald Reagan and George W. Bush: Voices behind the Throne (Woodrow Wilson Center Press, 2010)
- Wallison, Peter J. Ronald Reagan: The Power of Conviction and the Success of His Presidency. Westview Press, 2003. 282 pp.
- Wills, David C. The First War on Terrorism: Counter-Terrorism Policy during the Reagan Administration. 2004.
- Wilson, James Graham (2014). The Triumph of Improvisation: Gorbachev's Adaptability, Reagan's Engagement, and the End of the Cold War. Ithaca: Cornell University Press. ISBN 978-0801452291. Archived from the original on November 4, 2013.
- Wilson, James Graham. "How Grand Was Reagan's Strategy, 1976–1984?" in Diplomacy and Statecraft. Vol: 18. Issue: 4. 2007. 773–803.
- Woodward, Bob. Veil: The Secret Wars of the CIA, 1981-1987 (1987)

== Governor of California ==
- Anderson, Totton J. and Eugene C. Lee. "The 1966 Election in California," Western Political Quarterly (1967) 20#2 pp. 535–54 in JSTOR
- Cannon, Lou. Governor Reagan: His rise to power (PublicAffairs, 2005)
- De Groot, Gerard J. "‘A Goddamned Electable Person’: The 1966 California Gubernatorial Campaign of Ronald Reagan." History 82#267 (1997) pp: 429–48
- Hamilton, Gary G., and Nicole Woolsey Biggart. Governor Reagan, Governor Brown: A sociology of executive power (Columbia University Press, 1984)
- Holden, Kenneth. Making of the Great Communicator: Ronald Reagan's Transformation From Actor To Governor (2013)
- Putnam, Jackson K. "Governor Reagan: A Reappraisal." California History (2006): 24–45. in JSTOR
- Reeves, Michelle. "Obey the Rules or Get Out": Ronald Reagan's 1966 Gubernatorial Campaign and the 'Trouble in Berkeley'." Southern California Quarterly (2010): 275–305. in JSTOR
- Schuparra, Kurt. Triumph of the Right: The Rise of the California Conservative Movement, 1945–1966 (ME Sharpe, 1998)

== Rhetoric, media and values ==
- Aden, R. C. "Entrapment and Escape: Inventional Metaphors in Ronald Reagan's Economic Rhetoric." Southern Communication Journal 54 (1989): 384–401
- Bates, Toby Glenn. The Reagan Rhetoric: History and Memory in 1980s America (2011)
- Cunningham, Sean P. Cowboy Conservatism: Texas and the Rise of the Modern Right (2010)
- Dallek, Robert. Ronald Reagan: The Politics of Symbolism. (1999)
- Denton Jr., Robert E. Primetime Presidency of Ronald Reagan: The Era of the Television Presidency (1988)
- FitzWater, Marlin . Call the Briefing! Bush and Reagan, Sam and Helen, a Decade with Presidents and the Press. 1995. Memoir by Reagan's press spokesman.
- Goodnight, G. Thomas. "Ronald Reagan's Re-formulation of the Rhetoric of War: Analysis of the 'Zero Option,' 'Evil Empire,' and 'Star Wars' Addresses." Quarterly Journal of Speech 72 (1986): 390–414
- Greffenius, Steven. The Last Jeffersonian: Ronald Reagan's Dreams of America. June, July, & August Books. 2002
- Hertsgaard Mark. On Bended Knee: The Press and the Reagan Presidency 1988. Criticizes the press.
- Houck, Davis, and Amos Kiewe, eds. Actor, Ideologue, Politician: The Public Speeches of Ronald Reagan (Greenwood Press, 1993)
- Lewis, William F. "Telling America's Story: Narrative Form and the Reagan Presidency", Quarterly Journal of Speech: 280–302
- Jones, John M. "'Until Next Week': The Saturday Radio Addresses of Ronald Reagan" Presidential Studies Quarterly. Volume: 32. Issue: 1. 2002. pp. 84+
- Kengor, Paul. God and Ronald Reagan: A Spiritual Life Regan Books, 2004. ISBN.
- Kiewe, Amos, and Davis W. Houck. A Shining City on a Hill: Ronald Reagan's Economic Rhetoric, 1951–1989. 1991
- Meyer, John C. "Ronald Reagan and Humor: A Politician's Velvet Weapon", Communication Studies 41 (1990): 76–88
- Moore, Mark P. "Reagan's Quest for Freedom in the 1987 State of the Union Address." Western Journal of Communication 53 (1989): 52–65
- Muir, William Ker. The Bully Pulpit: The Presidential Leadership of Ronald Reagan (1992), examines his speeches
- Noonan, Peggy. When Character Was King: A Story of Ronald Reagan (2001) memoir by a Reagan speechwriter
- Ritter, Kurt W. Ronald Reagan: The Great Communicator. Greenwood, 1992
- Shogan, Colleen J. "Coolidge and Reagan: The Rhetorical Influence of Silent Cal on the Great Communicator", Rhetoric & Public Affairs 9.2 online at Project Muse; argues that Coolidge and Reagan shared a common ideological message, which served as the basis for modern conservatism. Even without engaging in explicitly partisan rhetoric, Reagan's principled speech served an important party-building function.
- Smith, Hedrick, et al. Reagan the Man, the President. (1980)
- Stahl, Lesley. "Reporting Live" (1999) memoir by TV news reporter
- Strock, James M. Reagan on Leadership (2011, Reagan Centennial Edition, foreword by Tom Peters), examines Reagan's leadership, management, and communications practices.
- Stuckey, Mary. Getting Into the Game: The Pre-Presidential Rhetoric of Ronald Reagan. Praeger, 1989
- Stuckey, Mary. Playing the Game: The Presidential Rhetoric of Ronald Reagan. Praeger, 1990
- Thomas, Tony. The Films of Ronald Reagan (1980)
- Troy, Gil. Morning in America: How Ronald Reagan Invented the 1980s (2004). Study of Reagan's image.
- Vaughn, Stephen. Ronald Reagan in Hollywood: Movies and Politics.Cambridge U. Press, 1994.
- Vaughn, Stephen (2002). "Ronald Reagan and the Struggle for Black Dignity in Cinema, 1937-1953". The Journal of African American History. 87 (1): 83–97. doi:10.1086/JAAHv87n1p83. JSTOR 1562493. S2CID 141324540.
- Wills, Garry. Reagan's America: Innocents at Home (1987)
- Golway, Terry. Ronald Reagan's America with CD: His Voice, His Dreams, and His Vision of Tomorrow (2008).

== Historiography and memory ==
- Baumgardner, Paul. "The Law: 'Something He and His People Naturally Would Be Drawn To': The Reagan Administration and the Law-and-Economics Movement." Presidential Studies Quarterly 49.4 (2019): 959–975. [ online]
- Brookhiser, Richard. "Reagan: His Place in History," American Heritage (2004) 55#4 pp. 34–39. online
- Cooper, James. "In Search of the Gipper: Ronald Reagan and the 1980s." Presidential Studies Quarterly 47.4 (2017): 831–834.
- Ehrman, John. "The Age of Reagan? Three Questions for Future Research," Journal of the Historical Society (2011) 11#1 pp. 111–31
- Hartung, William D. "Reagan Redux: The Enduring Myth of Star Wars" World Policy Journal 15#3 (1998), pp. 17–24 online
- Johns, Andrew L., ed. A Companion to Ronald Reagan (Wiley-Blackwell, 2015). xiv, 682 pp.; topical essays by scholars emphasizing historiography; contents free at many libraries
- Kengor, Paul. "Reagan among the professors: His surprising reputation." Policy Review 98 (1999): 15+. Reports that " many articles in the top journals have been fair, as have a number of influential books...from respected historians, presidential scholars, and political scientists -- people who were not Reagan supporters and are certainly not right-wingers."
- Troy, Gil. "Toward a Historiography of Reagan and the 1980s: Why Have We Done Such A Lousy Job?." in Ronald Reagan and the 1980s (Palgrave Macmillan, New York, 2008. 229–247).

== Primary sources ==
- Reagan, Ronald.; Hubler, Richard G. Where's the Rest of Me? The Ronald Reagan Story (1965), with Richard G. Hubler. Re-released in 1981.
- Reagan, Ronald. Abortion and the Conscience of the Nation (1983)
- Reagan, Nancy (with William Novak). My Turn: The Memoirs of Nancy Reagan (1989).
- Reagan, Ronald. Speaking My Mind: Selected Speeches (1989)
- Reagan, Ronald (with Robert Lindsey) An American Life: The Autobiography (1990), with Robert Lindsey.
- Reagan, Nancy. I Love You, Ronnie: The Letters of Ronald Reagan to Nancy Reagan (2000)
- Reagan, Ronald. Reagan: A Life in Letters (2003)
- Reagan, Ronald (edited by Douglas Brinkley). The Reagan Diaries (2007)
- Reagan, Ronald. The Notes: Ronald Reagan's Private Collection of Stories and Wisdom, edited by Douglas Brinkley, HarperCollins (2011)

=== By aides ===
- Anderson, Martin. Revolution: The Reagan Legacy (1990). Martin was one of Reagan's top economic policy advisers.
- Deaver, Michael and Mickey Herskowitz. Behind the Scenes (1987). Deaver was Reagan's Deputy Chief of Staff from 1981 to 1985.
- Deaver, Michael (with a foreword by Nancy Reagan). A Different Drummer: My Thirty Years with Ronald Reagan (2001).
- Emery, Christopher (with a foreword by Barbara Bush). White House Usher: Stories from the Inside (2017). Emery was a White House Usher from 1986 to 1994. ISBN 978-1634926560.
- Gergen, David. Eyewitness to Power: The Essence of Leadership (2000). Gergen was Reagan's White House Communications Director from 1981 to 1984.
- Haig, Alexander. Inner Circles: How America Changed the World (1994). Haig was Reagan's first Secretary of State from 1981 to 1982.
- Noonan, Peggy. What I Saw at the Revolution: A Political Life in the Reagan Era (1990). Noonan was a primary speechwriter and Special Assistant to Reagan from 1984 to 1986. ISBN 0-8129-6989-8.
- Regan, Donald. For the Record: From Wall Street to Washington (1988). Regan was Reagan's Secretary of the Treasury from 1981 to 1985 and Chief of Staff from 1985 to 1987. ISBN 0-8129-6989-8.
- Shultz, George P. Turmoil and Triumph My Years As Secretary of State (1993). Shultz was Reagan's second Secretary of State from 1982 to 1989.
- Weinberger, Caspar. In the Arena: A Memoir of the 20th Century (1991). Weinberger was Reagan's Secretary of Defense from 1981 to 1987.

== Works cited ==
- Woodard, J. David (2012). Ronald Reagan: A Biography. ABC-Clio. ISBN 978-0-313-39639-7.
