= List of The New York Times number-one books of 1988 =

The American daily newspaper The New York Times publishes multiple weekly lists ranking the best-selling books in the United States.

== Fiction ==
The following list ranks the number-one best-selling fiction books, in the hardcover fiction category.

Date	Book	Author
January 3	The Tommyknockers	Stephen King
January 10	The Tommyknockers	Stephen King
January 17	The Tommyknockers	Stephen King
January 24	The Bonfire of the Vanities	Tom Wolfe
January 31	The Bonfire of the Vanities	Tom Wolfe
February 7	The Bonfire of the Vanities	Tom Wolfe
February 14	The Bonfire of the Vanities	Tom Wolfe
February 21	The Bonfire of the Vanities	Tom Wolfe
February 28	The Bonfire of the Vanities	Tom Wolfe
March 6	The Bonfire of the Vanities	Tom Wolfe
March 13	The Bonfire of the Vanities	Tom Wolfe
March 20	The Icarus Agenda	Robert Ludlum
March 27	The Icarus Agenda	Robert Ludlum
April 3	The Icarus Agenda	Robert Ludlum
April 10	The Icarus Agenda	Robert Ludlum
April 17	The Icarus Agenda	Robert Ludlum
April 24	The Icarus Agenda	Robert Ludlum
May 1	The Icarus Agenda	Robert Ludlum
May 8	The Icarus Agenda	Robert Ludlum
May 15	Zoya	Danielle Steel
May 22	Zoya	Danielle Steel
May 29	Zoya	Danielle Steel
June 5	Zoya	Danielle Steel
June 12	Zoya	Danielle Steel
June 19	Zoya	Danielle Steel
June 26	Zoya	Danielle Steel
July 3	Alaska	James Michener
July 10	Alaska	James Michener
July 17	Alaska	James Michener
July 24	Alaska	James Michener
July 31	Alaska	James Michener
August 7	The Cardinal of the Kremlin	Tom Clancy
August 14	The Cardinal of the Kremlin	Tom Clancy
August 21	The Cardinal of the Kremlin	Tom Clancy
August 28	The Cardinal of the Kremlin	Tom Clancy
September 4	The Cardinal of the Kremlin	Tom Clancy
September 11	The Cardinal of the Kremlin	Tom Clancy
September 18	The Cardinal of the Kremlin	Tom Clancy
September 25	The Cardinal of the Kremlin	Tom Clancy
October 2	The Cardinal of the Kremlin	Tom Clancy
October 9	The Cardinal of the Kremlin	Tom Clancy
October 16	The Cardinal of the Kremlin	Tom Clancy
October 23	The Cardinal of the Kremlin	Tom Clancy
October 30	The Queen of the Damned	Anne Rice
November 6	The Queen of the Damned	Anne Rice
November 13	The Queen of the Damned	Anne Rice
November 20	The Sands of Time	Sidney Sheldon
November 27	The Sands of Time	Sidney Sheldon
December 4	The Sands of Time	Sidney Sheldon
December 11	The Sands of Time	Sidney Sheldon
December 18	The Sands of Time	Sidney Sheldon
December 25	The Sands of Time	Sidney Sheldon

== Nonfiction ==
The following list ranks the number-one best-selling nonfiction books, in the hardcover nonfiction category.

Date	Book	Author
January 3	Time Flies	Bill Cosby
January 10	Time Flies	Bill Cosby
January 17	Trump: The Art of the Deal	Donald Trump with Tony Schwartz
January 24	Trump: The Art of the Deal	Donald Trump with Tony Schwartz
January 31	Trump: The Art of the Deal	Donald Trump with Tony Schwartz
February 7	Trump: The Art of the Deal	Donald Trump with Tony Schwartz
February 14	Trump: The Art of the Deal	Donald Trump with Tony Schwartz
February 21	Trump: The Art of the Deal	Donald Trump with Tony Schwartz
February 28	Trump: The Art of the Deal	Donald Trump with Tony Schwartz
March 6	Trump: The Art of the Deal	Donald Trump with Tony Schwartz
March 13	Trump: The Art of the Deal	Donald Trump with Tony Schwartz
March 20	Trump: The Art of the Deal	Donald Trump with Tony Schwartz
March 27	Trump: The Art of the Deal	Donald Trump with Tony Schwartz
April 3	Trump: The Art of the Deal	Donald Trump with Tony Schwartz
April 10	Love, Medicine and Miracles	Bernie S. Siegel
April 17	Trump: The Art of the Deal	Donald Trump with Tony Schwartz
April 24	Love, Medicine and Miracles	Bernie S. Siegel
May 1	Love, Medicine and Miracles	Bernie S. Siegel
May 8	Love, Medicine and Miracles	Bernie S. Siegel
May 15	Moonwalk	Michael Jackson
May 22	Moonwalk	Michael Jackson
May 29	For The Record	Donald T. Regan
June 5	For The Record	Donald T. Regan
June 12	For The Record	Donald T. Regan
June 19	For The Record	Donald T. Regan
June 26	A Brief History of Time	Stephen W. Hawking
July 3	Talking Straight	Lee Iacocca with Sonny Kleinfield
July 10	Talking Straight	Lee Iacocca with Sonny Kleinfield
July 17	A Brief History of Time	Stephen W. Hawking
July 24	A Brief History of Time	Stephen W. Hawking
July 31	A Brief History of Time	Stephen W. Hawking
August 7	A Brief History of Time	Stephen W. Hawking
August 14	A Brief History of Time	Stephen W. Hawking
August 21	A Brief History of Time	Stephen W. Hawking
August 28	A Brief History of Time	Stephen W. Hawking
September 4	A Brief History of Time	Stephen W. Hawking
September 11	A Brief History of Time	Stephen W. Hawking
September 18	A Brief History of Time	Stephen W. Hawking
September 25	A Brief History of Time	Stephen W. Hawking
October 2	A Brief History of Time	Stephen W. Hawking
October 9	A Brief History of Time	Stephen W. Hawking
October 16	A Brief History of Time	Stephen W. Hawking
October 23	A Brief History of Time	Stephen W. Hawking
October 30	A Brief History of Time	Stephen W. Hawking
November 6	A Brief History of Time	Stephen W. Hawking
November 13	A Brief History of Time	Stephen W. Hawking
November 20	The Last Lion	William Manchester
November 27	The Last Lion	William Manchester
December 4	Gracie	George Burns
December 11	Gracie	George Burns
December 18	Gracie	George Burns
December 25	Gracie	George Burns

== See also ==
- Publishers Weekly list of bestselling novels in the United States in the 1980s
