= Joel Chasnoff =

American-Israeli stand-up comedian and writer

- יואל צ'זנוף
- Joel Chasnoff at the Improv Olympic, 2009
- Born: Joel Chasnoff; December 15, 1973 (age 52); Chicago, Illinois, United States
- Education: University of Pennsylvania

Comedy career
- Years active: 1997 - present
- Medium: stand-up, television, film
- Subjects: Jewish culture, pop culture, family
- Website: www.JoelChasnoff.com

Joel Chasnoff (Hebrew: יואל צ'זנוף; born December 15, 1973) is an American-Israeli stand-up comedian and writer with stage and screen credits in eight countries, and author of the comic memoir The 188th Crybaby Brigade, about his year as a tank soldier in the Israeli Army.

== Early life ==
Joel Chasnoff grew up in Evanston, Illinois, a suburb of Chicago, in a Conservative Jewish household with his parents and two younger brothers. His mother converted to Judaism before marrying his father. He attended Solomon Schechter Day School, where he describes himself as the smallest boy in his class and relied on humor to stand out.

His second-grade teacher, who was a native of Israel, helped inspire his connection to Israel. As a teen he traveled to Israel several times, including at age 13 with his family. He returned for a second trip at age 17, and later co-led a six-week Jewish teen tour to Poland and Israel. He was impressed by Israeli soldiers when he visited, and said he felt guilty about not doing something to help defend the country himself.

Chasnoff attended the University of Pennsylvania, studying mathematics and psychology. While at university, he was a member of the Mask and Wig club. His first professional acting job was as an entertainer at Philadelphia Phillies home games from 1995 to 1996. He also gave a standup performance at Hillel on campus, taped the show, and sent it to other Hillel locations.

== Israel Defense Forces ==
After graduating university and a half-hearted attempt at a stand-up career in New York City, Chasnoff immigrated to Israel and enlisted in the Israel Defense Forces at age 24. From 1997 to 1998 he served as a tank gunner in the 188th Armored Brigade in south Lebanon. His unit was responsible for defending Israel's north, including the Golan Heights and the Syrian border. His service included two months of Basic Training, two months of Tank School, three months of Advanced Warfare Training, followed by a tour of duty in South Lebanon, where he participated in operations against Hezbollah. During one such operation, Chasnoff wreaked havoc when he refused to fire on a pair of enemy combatants in an Open Fire Zone.

During his time of service Chasnoff attempted to marry his Israeli girlfriend, only to discover that he was not considered halakhically Jewish by the official Rabbinate of Israel and was thus unable to marry in the Jewish state.

== Comedy ==
After being discharged from the IDF, Chasnoff returned to the United States to pursue his comedy career, first at the Improv Olympic in Chicago and eventually in New York City. In 2016, he returned to Israel with his family. He has stage and screen credits in ten countries, including the U.S., Israel, Canada, Australia, the U.K., Switzerland, Japan, Korea, and Singapore. He's been the warm-up act for Jon Stewart and Lewis Black of The Daily Show, and went on a USO Comedy Tour of the Far East entertaining United States Marines. He has performed at more than 1,000 comedy clubs, colleges, festivals, and Jewish events across North America, Israel, and Europe.

His comedy, both stand-up and written, relies on non-degrading observations about the details of American life and his Jewish upbringing.

=== The 188th Crybaby Brigade ===
On February 9, 2010 Simon & Schuster published Chasnoff's comedic memoir about his experiences in the IDF. In August 2010 it climbed to #3 on the Denver Post bestseller list.

== Personal life ==
Chasnoff lives in Ra'anana, Israel with his wife, a native-born Israeli, and their children.

== Publishing History ==
- The 188th Crybaby Brigade: A Skinny Jewish Kid from Chicago Fights Hezbollah - A Memoir By: Joel Chasnoff, (Simon & Schuster, February 9, 2010)
- The Big Book of Jewish Humor, William Novak, Moshe Waldoks, (Collins, 2006)
- The Complete Idiot's Guide to Jokes, Larry Getlen, (Alpha, September 5, 2006)
- Israel 201: Israel 201: Your Next-Level Guide to the Magic, Mystery, and Chaos of Life in the Holy Land, Benji Lovitt, Joel Chasnoff, (Gefen, 2023)
