= Lovitt =

Lovitt is a surname. Notable people with the surname include:

- Benji Lovitt (born 1974), Israeli-American comedian, educator and writer
- Colin Lovitt, Australian barrister
- Hayley Lovitt (born 1986), American actress and production coordinator
- John Lovitt (1832–1908), Canadian ship’s captain, shipowner, shipbuilder, entrepreneur and politician
- Robin Lovitt (born 1963), American convicted murderer

== See also ==
- Cape Lovitt, is the westernmost point of New Zealand
- Lovitt Records, is an independent record in Greensboro, North Carolina
