= Where Have All the Leaders Gone? =

2007 book by Lee Iacocca

- Author: Lee Iacocca & Catherine Whitney
- Language: English
- Genre: Business
- Publication date: 2007
- Publication place: United States
- Media type: Print (Hardback & Paperback)

Where Have All the Leaders Gone? is a book by Lee Iacocca, the former CEO of Chrysler, published in 2007. Iacocca discusses the characteristics of a good leader, citing these Cs: Curiosity, Character, Courage, Conviction, Charisma, Creative, Communicate, Competent, Common Sense and the one he regards as most important, Crisis.

== Reception ==
A review in BusinessWeek said that "the book often comes off as a rant", and that "Anyone expecting a volume strictly focused on corporate leadership, with tips on managing a complex corporation, will be disappointed."

Library Journal said, "His mix of straightforward lists...and conversational and conversational asides makes for fast reading, although many readers may be surprised by his level of vitriol toward George W. Bush".
