= Benji Lovitt =

Israeli-American comedian, educator and writer (born 1974)

- בנג'י לוביט
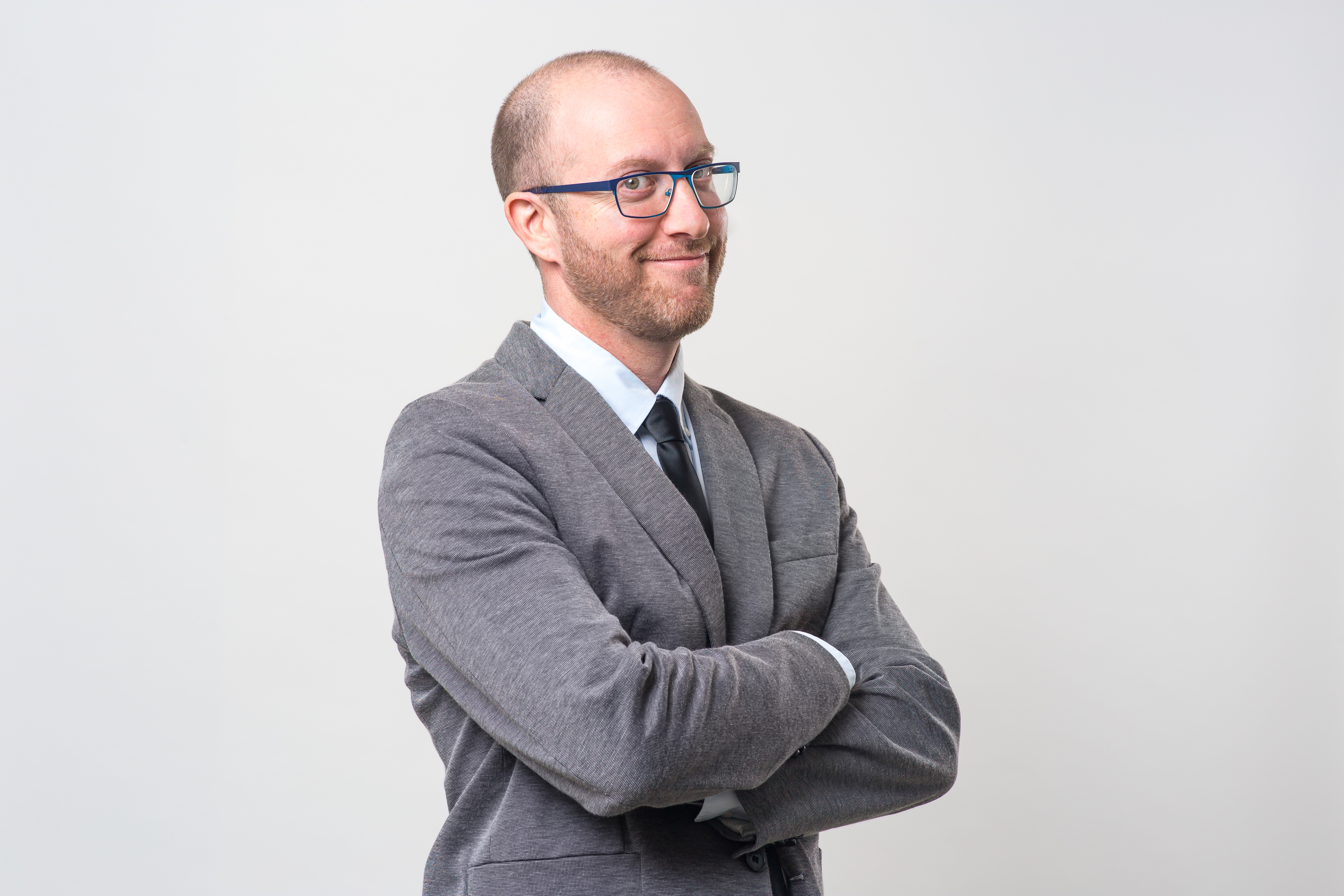
- Born: Benjamin Nathan Lovitt; September 27, 1974 (age 52); Dallas, Texas
- Education: University of Texas

Comedy career
- Genres: Israeli comedy, Jewish comedy, observational comedy
- Subjects: Israel, Jewish culture, Middle East, current events
- Website: www.benjilovitt.com

Benji Lovitt (Hebrew: בנג׳י לוביט) is an Israeli-American comedian, educator and writer.

== Biography ==
Benjamin (Benji) Lovitt was born in Dallas, Texas, attended J.J. Pearce High School, and earned a Bachelor of Arts in Psychology degree from The University of Texas at Austin.

Lovitt visited Israel for the first time when he was 15 years old as part of a Young Judaea trip, and he returned a few years later to spend a gap year before college as a participant on Young Judaea's Year Course program.

After university, Lovitt lived in Houston for several years, working at a start-up while trying standup for the first time at the Laff Stop comedy club. He then moved to Atlanta and continued performing as a hobby in the Punchline, Eddie’s Attic, and other venues. Unfulfilled in corporate work, he took a job at the Israeli Consulate to the Southeast United States, coordinating events on college campuses. In 2003, Lovitt moved to New York City to work for Young Judaea Israel Programs before making aliyah at the end of the Second Lebanon War in 2006.

== Stand-Up Career ==
In 2009, the Jewish Agency for Israel sent Lovitt on a six-city speaking tour across the United States to perform standup comedy about life in Israel. Since that time, he has performed in clubs and for Jewish organizations around the world, including South Africa, Australia, England, and more. Lovitt has opened for comedians including Jim Gaffigan, Elon Gold, and Yohay Sponder.

During Operation Protective Edge in the summer of 2014, Lovitt performed together with other comedians for Israeli civilians confined to bomb shelters or otherwise impacted by rockets launched by terrorists and for Israeli soldiers, with proceeds donated to the Friends of the IDF's Lone Soldier Program .

Lovitt also produced videos on Jewish holidays, aliyah and other topics.

== Content Creation Career ==
Lovitt is a regular blogger for the Times of Israel and previously provided guest columns for The Jerusalem Post. Articles by Lovitt can also be found at eJewish Philanthropy, the Jewish Daily Forward, Ynet, Israel21c, PresenTense Magazine, Jewish Boston and other online publications.

Lovitt's annual column "Things I love about Israel" Yom Ha'atzmaut highlight the unique aspects of Israeli society from the perspective of an oleh.

Lovitt's January 2014 article in eJewish Philanthropy about bringing short-term Israel program participants to Tel Aviv is credited as inspiring Birthright Israel to launch the Tel Aviv Urban Experience in 2015.

In 2023, Benji marked Israel's 75th anniversary by co-authoring the book “Israel 201, Your Next-Level Guide to the Magic, Mystery and Chaos! of Life in the Holy Land" with Joel Chasnoff. The book examines the daily life of Israelis and tries to give its readers insight into some unique aspects of Israeli culture. In 2023, the book won a National Jewish Book Award.
