= William Kleinknecht =

American journalist and author

William Kleinknecht is an American journalist and author. He has reported for the Detroit Free Press, New York Daily News, and The Star-Ledger.

== Books ==
- The New Ethnic Mobs: The Changing Face of Organized Crime in America (1996)
- The Man Who Sold the World: Ronald Reagan and the Betrayal of Main Street America (2009)
- States of Neglect: How Red-State Leaders Have Failed Their Citizens and Undermined America (The New Press, 2024)
