= Yohay Sponder =

Israeli comedian (born 1982)

- יוחאי ספונדר
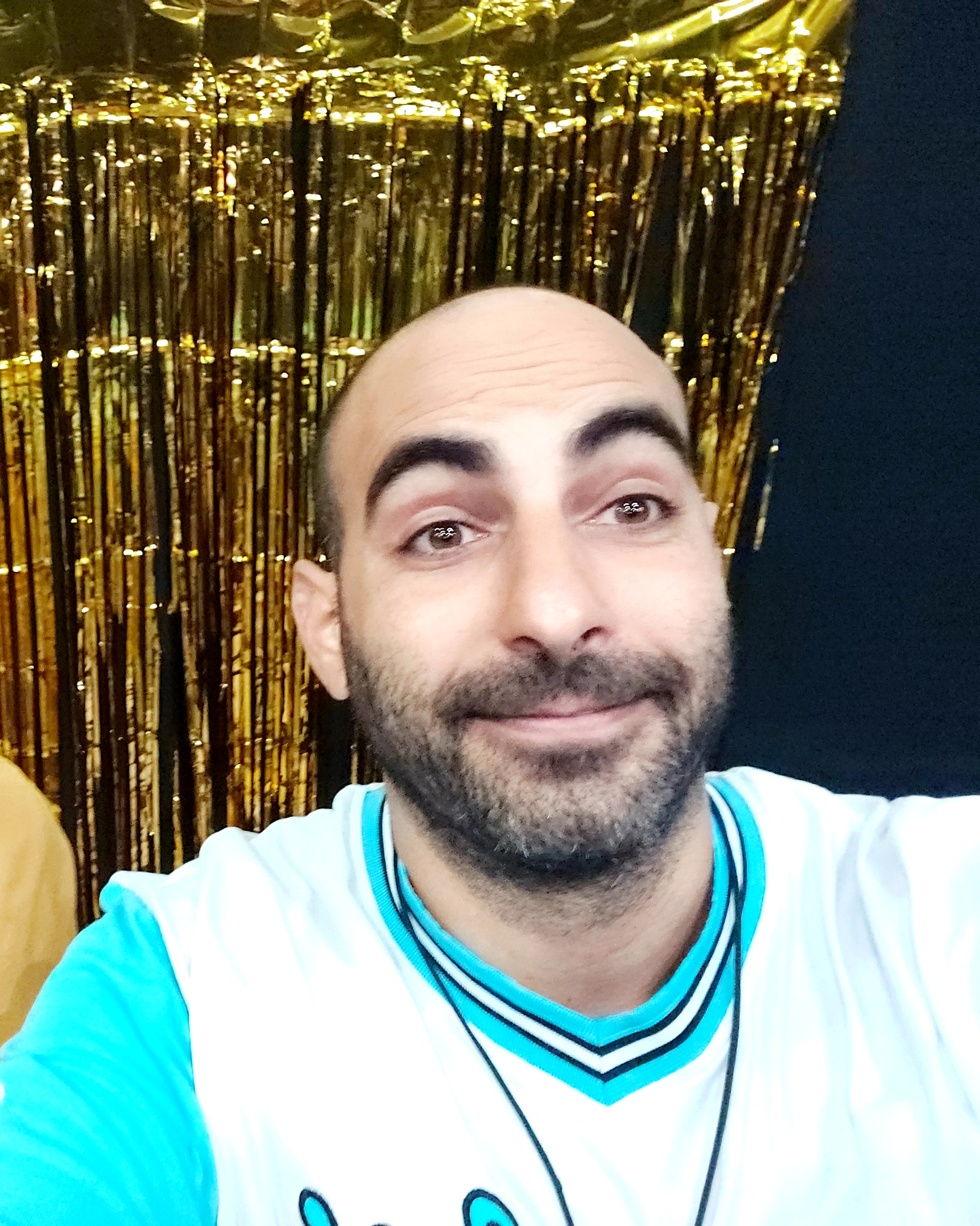
- Sponder in 2022
- Born: Yohay Sponder; 14 October 1982 (age 44); Givat Yoav, Israel
- Occupations: Stand-up comedian; actor

Yohay Sponder (Hebrew: יוחאי ספונדר, born 14 October 1982) is an Israeli stand-up comedian and actor. Sponder's father was the son of Polish Holocaust survivors. His mother's family is Moroccan. Sponder grew up in the Golan Heights and served in the Israel Defense Forces in the Armored Corps. A cousin of Sponder's was killed in combat in the October 7 attacks, leading him to regard comedy as his reserve duty. Sponder embarked on his "Self Loving Jew" show in English, to portray the Israeli experience since the Hamas led attacks.

== Personal life ==
In 2021, Sponder married a woman who attended one of his stand-up performances and now serves as his booking manager. They and their child live in Ramat Gan.

Sponder turned vegan after growing up on a farm.

== Career ==
After his discharge, he began performing stand-up comedy shows throughout Israel, beginning at the Camel Comedy Club and Comedy Bar in Tel Aviv.

In 2009, he appeared on TV for the first time on the show, "Beep Comedy House," which was broadcast on Beep Channel and Channel 2. Sponder hosted a stand-up segment on the radio program "Night Birds of Prophecy" with David Lifshitz and Avi Nussbaum on Army Radio (Galei Tzahal). Additional TV appearances include the American television program "West Coast Comedy" on HULU cable in 2013; hit Israeli sitcom “Kupa Rashit" (Checkout) in 2018; Kan 11's "Viral Relationships" with comedian Shahar Hason in 2020.

In 2012, Sponder began performing in English in collaboration with Hason, eventually launching their weekly "Funny Monday" show in Tel Aviv, one of the earliest and biggest contributions to English-language comedy in Israel. "It’s partly from Americans making aliyah and partly from tourists, but Israel now has a bigger English comedy scene than Amsterdam, Madrid and other European cities," he told The Jerusalem Post in 2022.

In 2024, Sponder launched his international “Self-Loving Jew” tour with performances in North America and Europe and performed with Jay Leno in a fundraiser in Los Angeles. His performances have been the target of anti-Israel protests and boycott campaigns. Two weeks before a show scheduled for January 25, 2025 at the Boom Chicago comedy club in Amsterdam, a protester entered the venue shouting "Free Palestine" and "How dare you let this Jew perform here", according to Sponder's spokeswoman. Boom Chicago canceled Sponder's appearances, citing safety concerns and advice from a consultation with police that Amsterdam police reportedly said they were not aware of. After thirty rejections from other venues to reschedule the performance, it took place on February 23, 2025, at a location disclosed to ticketholders the day before the event.

Sponder is noted for wearing a prominent Star of David necklace onstage.

He is represented by the United Talent Agency.

== See also ==
- Self-hating Jew
