= Talking Straight =

1988 book by Lee Iacocca

- Author: Lee Iacocca
- Publication date: 1988
- ISBN: 0-553-05270-5

Talking Straight (1988 Bantam Books) is a book written by Lee Iacocca, then CEO of Chrysler Motors, with Sonny Kleinfeld. It was written partly in response to Akio Morita's Made in Japan, a non-fiction book praising Japan's post-war hard-working culture. Talking Straight praised the innovation and creativity of Americans.
