= My Turn (memoir) =

1989 memoir by Nancy Reagan

- Author: Nancy Reagan with William Novak
- Language: English
- Genre: Memoir
- Published: October 18, 1989 Random House
- Publication place: United States
- Media type: Print
- Pages: 432
- ISBN: 0-8129-9211-3
- OCLC: 312416393
- Dewey Decimal: 973.927092
- LC Class: E878.R43 A3

My Turn: The Memoirs of Nancy Reagan is an autobiography authored by former First Lady of the United States Nancy Reagan with William Novak. It was published by Random House in 1989.

== Content ==
Reagan recalls her influence within the Reagan administration, her love of her husband, strained relationship with family members and her bout with breast cancer.

=== The White House staff ===
According to Fred Barnes, a former news columnist and current television pundit on Fox News, Reagan's book was a confirmation of many speculated reports about the Reagan White House. Reagan argues against the media about her image, saying she was not "as bad, or as extreme in my power or my weakness, as I was depicted." She comments on President Reagan's White House staff frequently: of James Baker, former White House Chief of Staff, she says that "his main interest was Jim Baker"; Michael Deaver, a Reagan adviser for two decades, "caught a bad case of Potomac fever"; William Clark, a Reagan staffer, was a "bad choice" for top positions within the administration and a "user" who unjustly spoke for President Reagan. Donald Regan, former Treasury Secretary and White House Chief of Staff who often had a contested relationship with Nancy Reagan, was talked about in detail. In her memoir, Reagan denied forming a plan to oust him from the staff, saying that there was not "a plot to get rid of Don Regan. There was no cabal. I wasn't in cahoots with anybody to bring about his downfall." On the Cold War front, Reagan takes credit for assembling a meeting in Geneva between her husband and Soviet General Secretary Mikhail Gorbachev.

=== Her husband ===
One of the most discussed matters in the book is her husband, and how much influence she exerted over him while in office. In the book, she explains that she found it proper and just to talk to the president and advise him on anything. She admits that she consulted an astrologer, Joan Quigley, but says it only started after the 1981 attempt on President Reagan's life. She acknowledges that she altered the President's schedule without his knowledge based on astrological advice, but argues that "no political decision was ever based [on astrology]". She also writes about how after the shooting, she became very fretful and worried about her husband every time he left the White House. She wrote, "I'm a worrier, and now I really had something to worry about: that it might happen again, and that this time, I would lose him forever. Astrology was simply one of the ways I coped with the fear I felt after my husband almost died."

=== Her children ===
Perhaps the most recorded problem of Nancy Reagan's was that of her children and stepchildren, Maureen, Michael, Patti, and Ron. The most-publicized controversy erupted between Nancy and her daughter Patti Davis. Reagan wrote of it, "there is still time for us to improve our relationship, and now that our public years are over, I'm hoping Patti and I will be able to reach some kind of understanding." This was written in 1989 and Reagan and her daughter eventually reconciled. However, in the book, she faults her for not attending her grandmother's funeral, and for being a difficult child.

Regarding Michael, Reagan speaks of a controversy between them. In 1984, the first lady said on television that she and Michael were in an "estrangement right now". Michael responded that Nancy was trying to cover up for the fact she had not met his daughter, Ashley, who had been born nearly a year earlier. They also made peace.

Reagan was thought to be closest to her stepdaughter, Maureen, during her White House years.

== References and further reading ==
- Benze, James G. Jr. (2005). Nancy Reagan: On the White House Stage. United States: University Press of Kansas. ISBN 0-7006-1401-X.
- Reagan, Nancy (2002). I Love You, Ronnie: The Letters of Ronald Reagan to Nancy Reagan. United States: Random House. ISBN 0-375-76051-2.
- Reagan, Nancy; William Novak (1989). My Turn: The Memoirs of Nancy Reagan. New York: Random House. ISBN 0-394-56368-9.
- Reagan, Nancy (1980). Nancy: The Autobiography of America's First Lady. United States: HarperCollins. ISBN 978-0-688-03533-4.
- Reagan, Nancy (1982). To Love a Child. United States: Bobbs-Merrill. ISBN 0-672-52711-1.
