= Lee Iacocca =

American businessman (1924–2019)

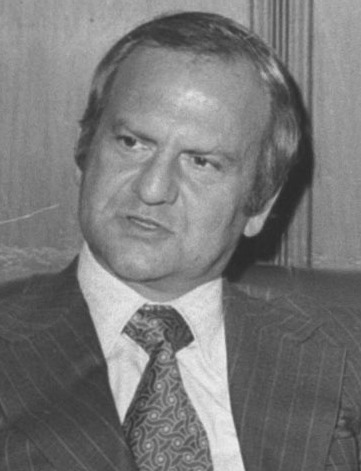
- Iacocca in 1972
- Born: Lido Anthony Iacocca; October 15, 1924; Allentown, Pennsylvania, U.S.
- Died: July 2, 2019 (aged 94); Los Angeles, California, U.S.
- Education: Lehigh University (BS); Princeton University (MS)
- Occupations: President and CEO of the Ford Motor Company (1970–1978); Chairman, president, and CEO of the Chrysler Corporation (1978–1992); Acting chairman of Koo Koo Roo (1998)
- Years active: 1946–1992
- Spouses: Mary McCleary (m. 1956; died 1983); Peggy Johnson (m. 1986; ann. 1987); Darrien Earle (m. 1991; div. 1994)
- Children: 2
- Engineering career
- Discipline: Industrial engineering; mechanical engineering
- Employer: Ford Motor Company
- Projects: Ford Mustang; Lincoln Continental Mark III; Ford Escort; Mercury Cougar; Mercury Marquis
- Awards: Ralph Coates Roe Medal (1984); Jefferson Award for Public Service (1985); National Academy of Engineering (1986)
- Writing career
- Genres: Autobiography; memoir; non-fiction
- Subjects: American economy; international trade; leadership; management; politics
- Notable works: Iacocca: An Autobiography (1984); Talking Straight (1988); Where Have All the Leaders Gone? (2007)
- Movement: Economic nationalism

Lido Anthony "Lee" Iacocca (/ˌaɪ.əˈkoʊkə/ EYE-ə-KOH-kə; October 15, 1924 – July 2, 2019) was an American author, engineer, executive, and syndicated columnist who developed the Ford Mustang, Continental Mark III, and Ford Pinto cars while at the Ford Motor Company in the 1960s, and then revived the Chrysler Corporation as its CEO during the 1980s. He was president of Chrysler from 1978 to 1991 and chairman and CEO from 1979 until his retirement at the end of 1992. He was one of the few executives to preside over the operations of two of the United States' Big Three automakers.

Iacocca authored or co-authored several books, including Iacocca: An Autobiography (with William Novak), and Where Have All the Leaders Gone?.

== Early life and education ==
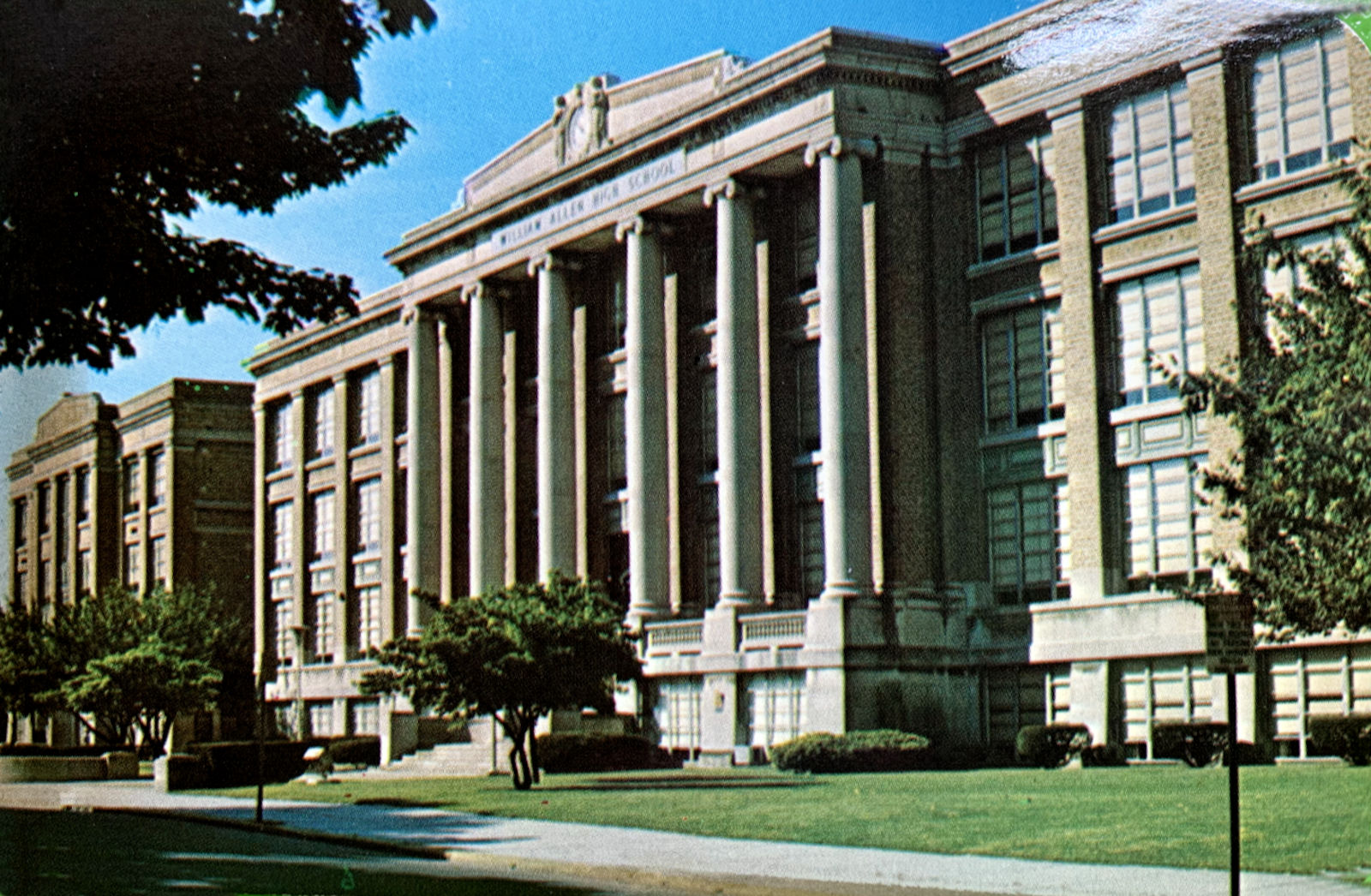
Allentown High School, now William Allen High School, in Allentown, Pennsylvania, where Iacocca graduated with honors in 1942, before obtaining an undergraduate industrial engineering degree from Lehigh and a master's degree in mechanical engineering from Princeton.

Iacocca was born in Allentown, Pennsylvania, on October 15, 1924, to Nicola Iacocca and Antonietta Perrotta, Italian Americans from San Marco dei Cavoti, who settled in the steel producing region of the Lehigh Valley in eastern Pennsylvania. Members of his family opened a restaurant, Yocco's Hot Dogs, which has since grown to five locations in Allentown and its suburbs. Iacocca was reportedly christened with the unusual name "Lido" because he was conceived during his parents' honeymoon in the Lido district in Venice. However, he denied the basis for his christened name in his autobiography, calling it romantic but untrue; his father, Iacocca wrote, travelled to Lido with the brother of his future wife, long before the marriage.

Iacocca attended Allentown High School in Allentown, where he graduated with honors in 1942. He then attended Lehigh University in neighboring Bethlehem, Pennsylvania, where he graduated with a degree in industrial engineering. At Lehigh University, he was a member of Tau Beta Pi, the engineering honor society, and Theta Chi fraternity.

After graduating from Lehigh, he won the Wallace Memorial Fellowship and attended Princeton University, where he earned a master's degree in mechanical engineering in 1946.

== Career ==
=== Ford Motor Company (1946 to 1978) ===
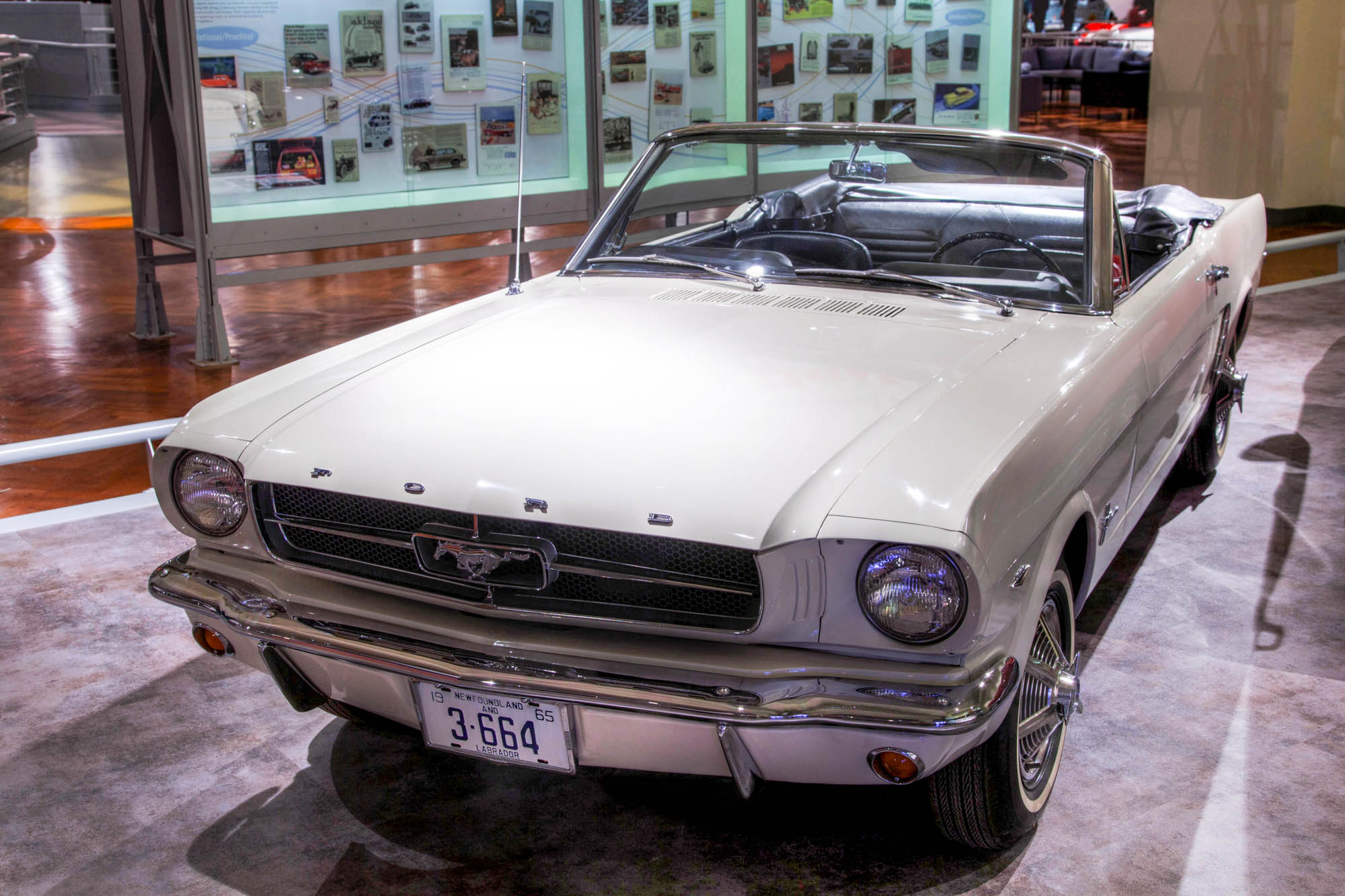
A 1965 Ford Mustang convertible from what is considered the first generation of Mustangs. Iacocca was instrumental in the Mustang's development.

Iacocca joined Ford Motor Company in August 1946 as an engineer. After this brief stint in engineering, he asked to be moved to sales and marketing, where his career flourished. While working in the Philadelphia district as assistant sales manager, Iacocca gained national recognition with his "56 for '56" campaign, offering loans on 1956 model year cars with a 20% down payment and $56 (~$663.00 in 2025) in monthly payments for three years. His campaign went national, and Iacocca was called to the Dearborn headquarters, where he quickly moved up through the ranks. On November 10, 1960, Iacocca was named vice-president and general manager of the Ford Division; in January 1965 Ford's vice-president, car and truck group; in 1967, executive vice-president; and president on December 10, 1970.

Iacocca participated in the design of several successful Ford automobiles, most notably the Ford Mustang, the Continental Mark III, the Ford Escort and the revival of the Mercury brand in the late 1960s, including the introduction of the Mercury Cougar and Mercury Marquis. He promoted other ideas that did not reach the marketplace as Ford products, including cars ultimately introduced by Chrysler: the K car and the minivan. Iacocca also convinced company boss Henry Ford II to return to racing, claiming several wins at the Indianapolis 500, NASCAR, and the 24 Hours of Le Mans.

Eventually, he became the president of the Ford Motor Company, but he clashed with Henry Ford II. On July 13, 1978, Iacocca was fired from Ford, even though the company posted a $2 billion profit for the year (about $9.87 billion in 2025).

==== Ford Pinto ====
In 1968, Iacocca foresaw the need for domestically produced, small, fuel-efficient vehicles, and proposed a vehicle that weighed less than 2,000 pounds and would be priced at less than $2,000 (about $19,000 in 2025). Although Ford's European subsidiary was already selling such a model, the Ford Escort, a team of Ford designers was assigned to create the exterior and interior of an entirely new car, which would be named Pinto. The Pinto entered production beginning with the 1971 model year. Iacocca was described as the "moving force" behind the Ford Pinto.

In 1977, there were allegations that the Pinto's structural design allowed its fuel-tank filler neck to break off and the fuel tank to be punctured in a rear-end collision, resulting in deadly fires. In 1978, all 1971–76 Pintos were recalled and had safety shielding and reinforcements installed to protect the fuel tank.

=== Chrysler (1978 to 1992) ===
Iacocca was strongly courted by Chrysler at a time when the company appeared to be on the verge of going out of business and had just sold its loss-making Chrysler Europe division to Peugeot in an effort to generate cash because the company was losing millions already in North America. This was partially due to recalls of its Dodge Aspen and Plymouth Volare, both of which, Iacocca later said, were among the causes for Chrysler's woes and customer dissatisfaction. Iacocca joined Chrysler and began rebuilding the entire company from the ground up and bringing in many former associates from Ford.

Also from Ford, Iacocca brought to Chrysler the "Mini-Max" project, which, in 1983, bore fruit in the highly successful Dodge Caravan and Plymouth Voyager. Henry Ford II had wanted nothing to do with the Mini-Max, a restyled version of the minivan, which Toyota was selling in huge numbers in Asia and Latin America, and his opinion doomed the project at Ford. Hal Sperlich, the driving force behind the Mini-Max at Ford, had been fired a few months before Iacocca. He had been hired by Chrysler, where the two would make automotive history together.

Iacocca arrived shortly after Chrysler's introduction of the subcompact Dodge Omni and Plymouth Horizon. Bearing a strong resemblance to the Volkswagen Rabbit, the front-wheel-drive Omni and Horizon became instant hits, selling over 300,000 units each in their debut year, showing what was to come for Chrysler. The Omni was a derivative of Chrysler Europe's Chrysler Horizon, one of the first deliberately designed "World Cars", which resulted in the American and European cars looking nearly identical externally. However, underneath remarkably similar-looking sheetmetal, engines, transmissions, suspensions, bumpers, and interior design were quite different. Initially the U.S. cars even used VW-based engines (while the European models used Simca engines), as American Chrysler did not have an engine of an appropriate size for the Omni until the 2.2L engine from the Chrysler K-Car became available. Ironically, some later year base model U.S. Omnis used a French Peugeot-based 1.6L engine.

==== 1979 Chrysler bailout ====
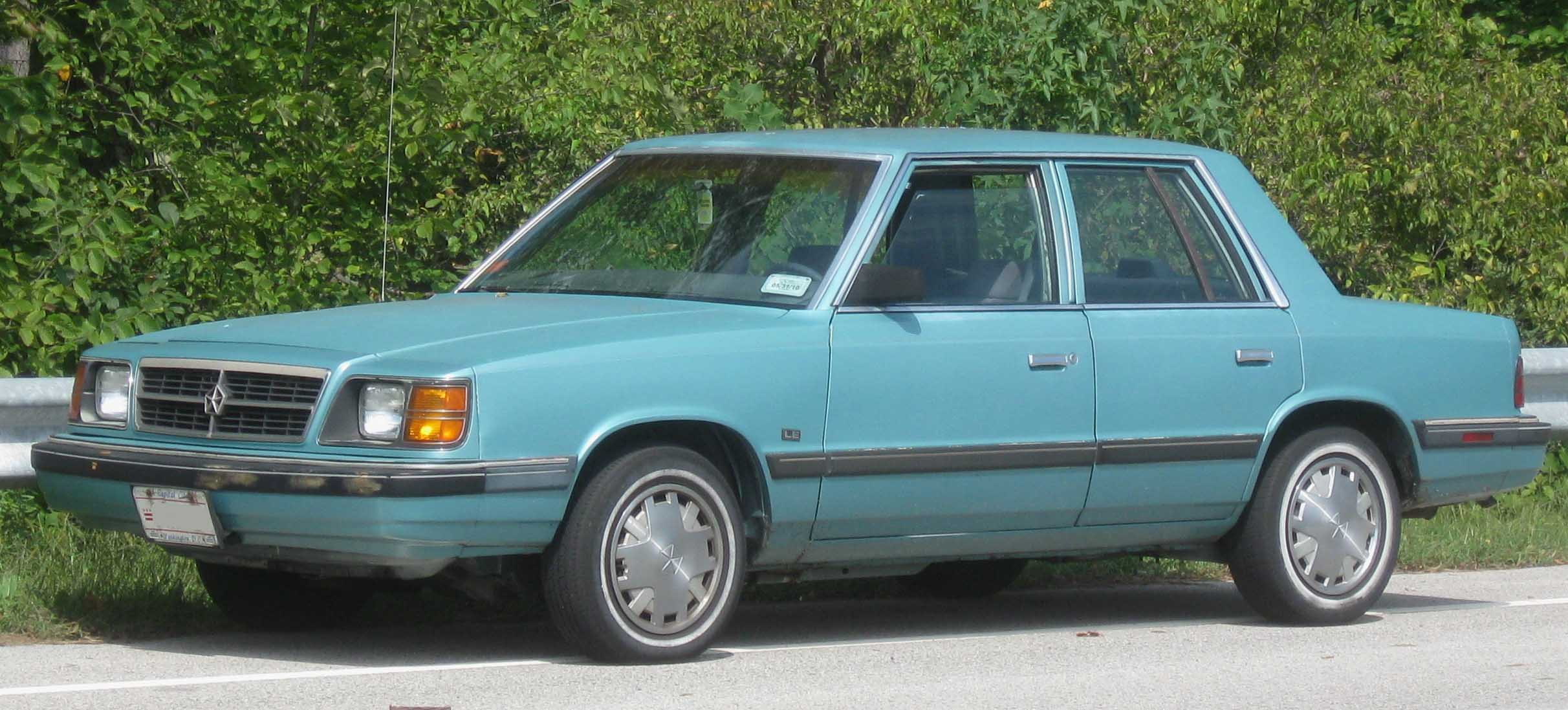
The Dodge Aries, a Chrysler K-Car

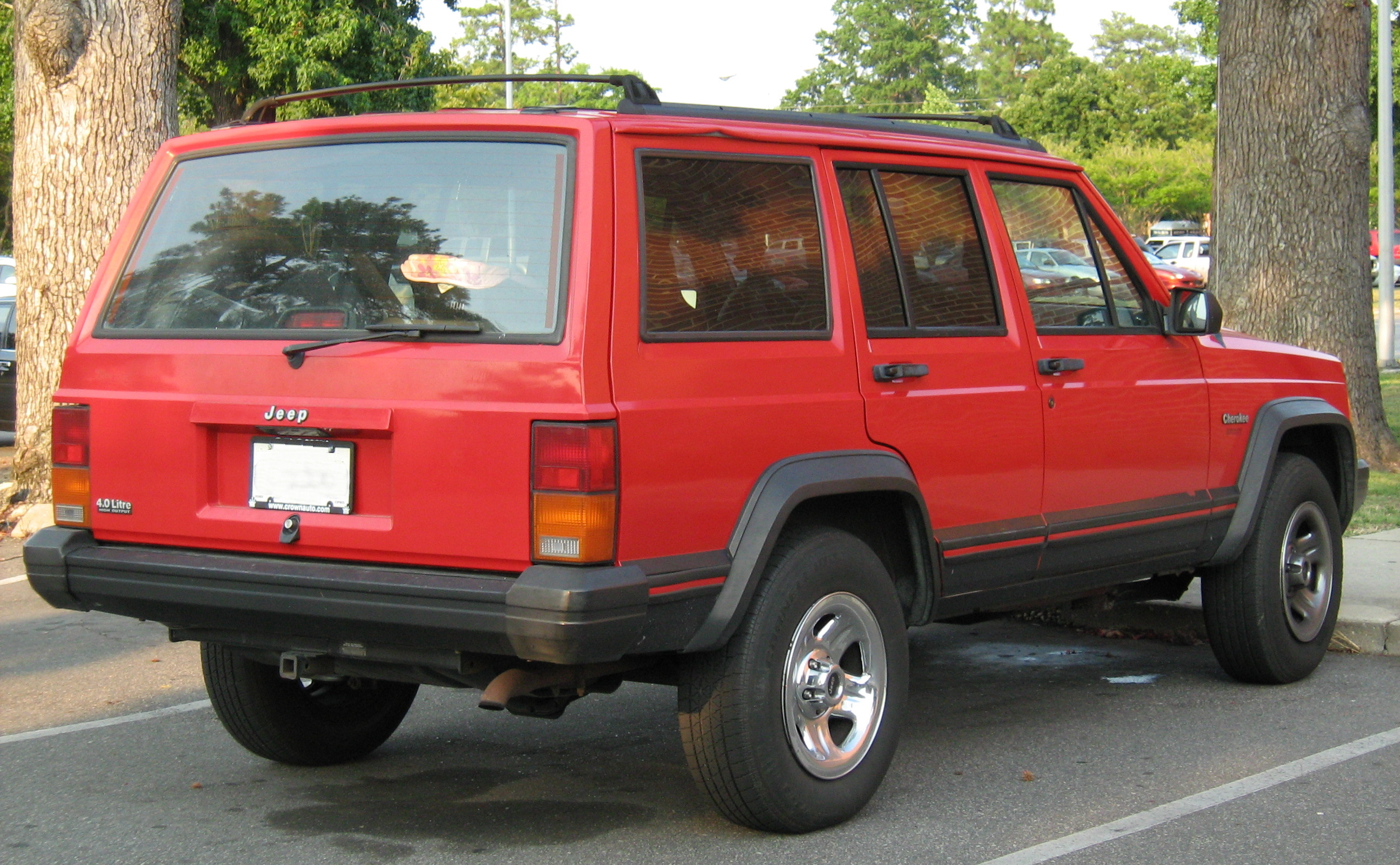
Iacocca's desire to obtain Jeep Cherokee's design was the driving force behind Chrysler's 1987 acquisition of American Motors Corporation.

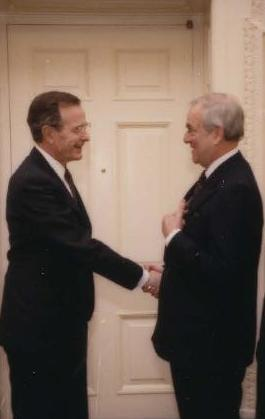
Iacocca and then US President George H. W. Bush at the White House in January 1991

Realizing that the company would go out of business if it did not receive a large infusion of cash, Chrysler approached the United States Congress in 1979 and requested a loan guarantee. Chairman and CEO John J. Riccardo resigned on September 17, 1979, because he believed that the company would be more likely to receive government aid under new management. His retirement took effect three days later and he was succeeded by Iacocca. Iacocca was able to obtain the guarantee, but Chrysler was required to reduce costs and abandon some longstanding projects, such as the turbine engine, which had been ready for consumer production in 1979 after nearly 20 years of development.

Chrysler released the first of the K-Car line, the Dodge Aries and Plymouth Reliant, in 1981. Similar to the later minivan, these compact automobiles were based on design proposals that Ford had rejected during Iacocca's (and Sperlich's) tenure. Released in the middle of the major 1980–1982 recession, the small, efficient, and inexpensive front-wheel drive cars sold rapidly. In addition, Iacocca re-introduced the big Imperial as the company's flagship. The new model had all of the newest technologies of the time, including fully electronic fuel injection and all-digital dashboard.

Chrysler introduced the minivan, considered Sperlich's "baby", in late 1983. It led the automobile industry in sales for 25 years. Because of the K-cars and minivans, along with the reforms Iacocca implemented, the company turned around quickly and was able to repay the government-backed loans seven years earlier than expected.

Iacocca led Chrysler's acquisition of AMC in 1987, which brought the profitable Jeep division under the corporate umbrella. It created the short-lived Eagle division. By this time, AMC had already finished most of the work on the Jeep Grand Cherokee, which Iacocca wanted. The Grand Cherokee would not be released until 1992 for the 1993 model year, the same year that Iacocca retired.

Throughout the 1980s, Iacocca, with the help of his longtime friend and advertisement executive, Leo-Arthur Kelmenson, appeared in a series of commercials developed by Kenyon & Eckhardt for the company's vehicles, employing the ad campaign, "The pride is back", to denote the turnaround of the corporation. He also voiced what was to become his trademark phrase: "If you can find a better car, buy it."

Iacocca retired as president, CEO, and chairman of Chrysler at the end of 1992.

=== 1995 return to Chrysler ===
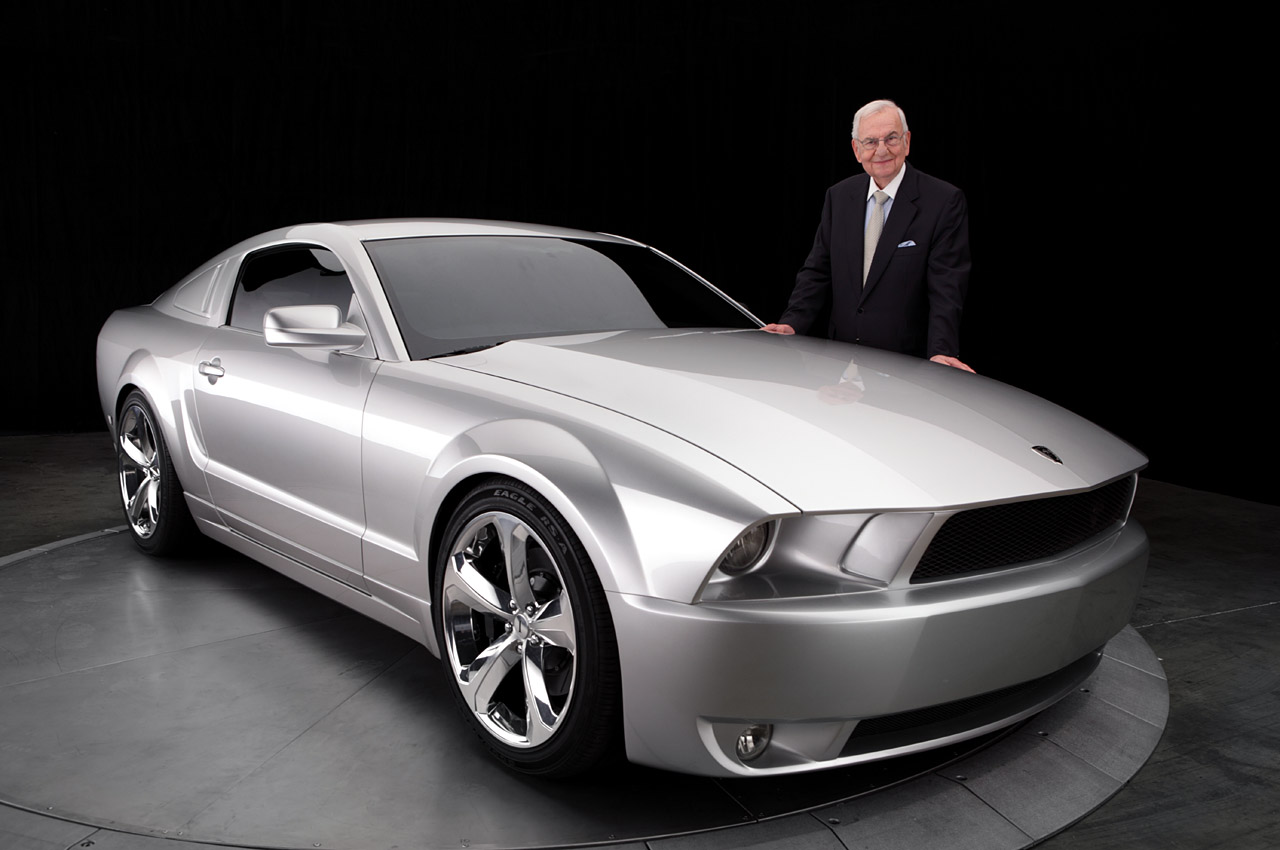
Iacocca with the 2009 Ford Mustang in April 2009

In 1995, Iacocca helped billionaire Kirk Kerkorian attempt a hostile takeover of Chrysler, which was ultimately unsuccessful. The next year, Kerkorian and Chrysler made a five-year agreement which included a gag order preventing Iacocca from speaking publicly about Chrysler.

In July 2005, Iacocca returned to the airwaves as Chrysler's pitchman, along with celebrities such as Jason Alexander and Snoop Dogg, to promote Chrysler's "Employee Pricing Plus" program; the ads reprise the "If you can find a better car, buy it" line, Iacocca's trademark of the 1980s. In return for his services, Iacocca and DaimlerChrysler agreed that his fees, plus a $1 donation per vehicle sold from July 1 through December 31, 2005, would be given to the Iacocca Foundation for type 1 diabetes research.

=== Chrysler bankruptcy ===
In an April 2009 Newsweek interview, Iacocca reflected on his time spent at Chrysler and the company's current situation. He said:

This is a sad day for me. It pains me to see my old company, which has meant so much to America, on the ropes. But Chrysler has been in trouble before, and we got through it, and I believe they can do it again. If they're smart, they'll bring together a consortium of workers, plant managers and dealers to come up with real solutions. These are the folks on the front lines, and they're the key to survival. Let's face it, if your car breaks down, you're not going to take it to the White House to get fixed. But, if your company breaks down, you've got to go to the experts on the ground, not the bureaucrats. Every day I talk to dealers and managers, who are passionate and full of ideas. No one wants Chrysler to survive more than they do. So I'd say to the Obama administration, don't leave them out. Put their passion and ideas to work.

Because of the Chrysler bankruptcy, Iacocca lost part of his pension from a supplemental executive retirement plan, and a guaranteed company car during his lifetime. The losses occurred after the bankruptcy court approved the sale of Chrysler to Chrysler Group LLC, with ownership of the new company by the United Auto Workers, the Italian carmaker Fiat and the governments of the United States and Canada.

== Other work and activities ==
=== Books ===
External videos
- Presentation by Iacocca on Where Have All the Leaders Gone?, April 23, 2007, C-SPAN

In 1984, Iacocca co-wrote an autobiography with William Novak: Iacocca: An Autobiography. It was the best selling non-fiction hardback book of 1984 and 1985. The book used heavy discounting, which would become a trend among publishers in the 1980s. Iacocca donated the proceeds of the book's sales to type 1 diabetes research.

In 1988, with Sonny Kleinfeld, Iacocca co-authored Talking Straight, a book meant as a counterbalance to Akio Morita's Made in Japan, a non-fiction book praising Japan's post-war hard-working culture. Talking Straight praised the innovation and creativity of Americans.

On April 17, 2007, Simon & Schuster published Iacocca's book, Where Have All the Leaders Gone?, co-written with Catherine Whitney.

=== Businesses ===
Iacocca partnered with producer Pierre Cossette to bring a production of The Will Rogers Follies to Branson, Missouri, in 1994. He also invested in Branson Hills, a 1,400-acre housing development.

In 1993, he had joined the board of MGM Grand, led by his friend Kirk Kerkorian. He started a merchant bank to fund ventures in the gaming industry, which he called "the fastest-growing business in the world". In 1995, he sold his interests in several Indian gaming projects to Full House Resorts, a casino operator led by his friend Allen Paulson, becoming a major shareholder and later a member of the board of directors.

Iacocca founded Olivio Premium Products in 1993. Olivio's signature product was an olive oil-based margarine product. Iacocca appeared in commercials for Olivio.

Iacocca joined the board of restaurant chain Koo Koo Roo in 1995. In 1998, he stepped up to serve as acting chairman of the troubled company, and led it through a merger with Family Restaurants (owner of Chi-Chi's and El Torito). He sat on the board of the merged company until stepping down in 1999.

In 1997, Iacocca founded Iacocca, a company formed to develop and market electric bikes with a top speed of 15 mph and a range of 20 miles between recharging at wall outlets. They produced E-Bike SX, which became the first widely popular electric bicycle in the US. In 1999, Iacocca became the head of EV Global Motors.

=== Activism and philanthropy ===
In May 1982, President Ronald Reagan appointed Iacocca to head the Statue of Liberty-Ellis Island Foundation, which was created to raise funds for the restoration of the Statue of Liberty and the renovation of Ellis Island. Iacocca continued to serve on the board of the foundation until his death.

Following the death of Iacocca's wife Mary from type 1 diabetes, he became an active supporter of research for the disease. He was one of the main patrons of the research of Denise Faustman at Massachusetts General Hospital. In 2000, Iacocca founded Olivio Premium Products, which manufactures the Olivio line of food products made from olive oil. He donated all profits from the company to type 1 diabetes research. In 2004, Iacocca launched Join Lee Now, a national grassroots campaign, to bring Faustman's research to human clinical trials in 2006.

Iacocca was an advocate of "Nourish the Children", an initiative of Nu Skin Enterprises, since its inception in 2002, and served as its chairman. He helped donate a generator for the Malawi VitaMeal plant.

Iacocca led the fundraising campaign to enable Lehigh University in Bethlehem, Pennsylvania, to adapt and use vacant buildings formerly owned by Bethlehem Steel, including Iacocca Hall on the Mountaintop Campus at the university. These structures currently house the College of Education, the biology and chemical engineering departments, and The Iacocca Institute, which is focused on global competitiveness.

=== Acting ===
Iacocca played Park Commissioner Lido in "Sons and Lovers", the 44th episode of Miami Vice, which premiered on May 9, 1986. The name of the character is his birth name, which was not used in the public sphere due to the trouble of mispronunciation or misspelling.

== Personal life ==
=== Marriages and family ===
Iacocca married Mary McCleary on September 29, 1956 and they had two daughters. She died from type 1 diabetes on May 15, 1983. Before her death, Iacocca became a strong advocate for better medical treatment of type 1 diabetes patients, who frequently faced debilitating and fatal complications, and he continued this work after her death.

Iacocca's second marriage was to Peggy Johnson. They married on April 17, 1986, but in 1987, after nineteen months, Iacocca had the marriage annulled. He married for the third time in 1991 to Darrien Earle. They were divorced three years later.

Iacocca resided in the Bel Air neighborhood of Los Angeles in his later years.

== Death ==
On July 2, 2019, Iacocca died at his home in Bel Air, at the age of 94, from complications of Parkinson's disease.

His funeral mass was held on July 10, 2019, at St. Hugo of the Hills Catholic Church and he is buried at White Chapel Memorial Cemetery in Troy, Michigan.

== Politics ==
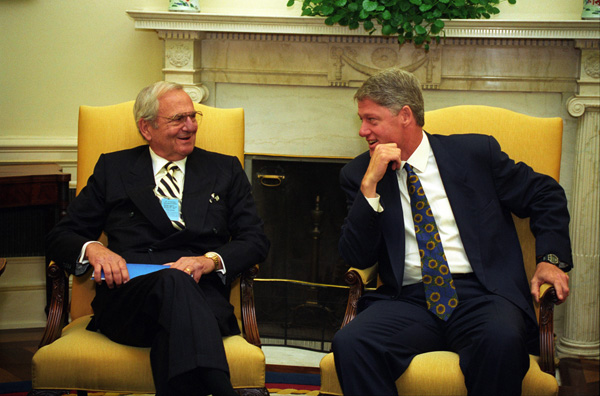
Iacocca meeting with then President Bill Clinton in the Oval Office in September 1993

In his 2007 book, Where Have All the Leaders Gone?, Iacocca described how he considered running for president in 1988 and was in the planning stages of a campaign with the slogan "I Like I", before ultimately being talked out of it by his friend Tip O'Neill.

Pennsylvania Governor Bob Casey discussed with Iacocca an appointment to the U.S. Senate in 1991 after the death of Senator John Heinz, but Iacocca declined.

Politically, Iacocca supported the Republican Party candidate George W. Bush in the 2000 U.S. presidential election. In the 2004 U.S. presidential election, he endorsed Bush's Democratic Party opponent, John Kerry. In the 2006 Michigan gubernatorial election, Iacocca appeared in televised political ads endorsing Republican candidate Dick DeVos, who lost. Iacocca endorsed New Mexico governor Bill Richardson for president in the 2008 U.S. presidential election. In the 2012 U.S. presidential election, he endorsed Mitt Romney for president.

== In popular culture ==
The high amount of publicity that Iacocca received during his turnaround of Chrysler made him a celebrity and gave him a lasting impact in popular culture. In addition to his acting role in Miami Vice, Iacocca also made appearances on Good Morning America, Late Night With David Letterman and the 1985 Bob Hope TV special Bob Hope Buys NBC? while concurrently it was common to see depictions of elderly, bespectacled businessmen with charismatic, salesman-like personas, such as in an ad campaign by the Rainier Brewing Company. Iacocca's success serving as Chrysler's pitchman influenced other companies to feature executives in their marketing, such as how fast food chain Wendy's has successfully utilized company founder Dave Thomas as a corporate mascot since the early 1990s. Iacocca's image was also invoked by rival automaker Ford in the marketing campaign for the 1993 Mercury Villager minivan, which depicted a competing car company led by an unhappy boss with a physical resemblance to Iacocca viewing the Villager with consternation because it is outselling their minivan. Fictional businessmen and middle managers, such as Michael Scott on The Office, have been shown reading Iacocca's books and attempting to emulate his methods. In a manner similar to Ronald Reagan, period pieces produced in subsequent decades have used images of Iacocca and the Chrysler K-car to invoke the 1980s. The 2009 film Watchmen, which is set in an alternative history 1985, took this in a unique direction by showing Iacocca (portrayed by Walter Addison) being assassinated by the film's antagonists, which has been said to have angered Iacocca when he learned about it. In Ordinary People, a song from Neil Young released in Chrome Dreams II and Bluenote Café, Lee Iacocca is quoted in the lyrics as a notable representative of the capitalistic world.

Iacocca, portrayed by Jon Bernthal, is a major character in the 2019 film Ford v Ferrari, which is a dramatization of the 1960s Ford GT40 program. The film was released shortly after Iacocca's death.

Tom Paxton wrote a song about the bailouts called "I Am Changing My Name To Chrysler," which mentions Iacocca prominently in the chorus. It was critical of the bailout for serving corporate interests ahead of supposed good business or capitalist principles.

He was also portrayed by Phil Hartman on Saturday Night Live.

== Awards ==
In 1985, Iacocca received the S. Roger Horchow Award for Greatest Public Service by a Private Citizen, an award given out annually by Jefferson Awards.

== Written works ==
=== Books ===
- Iacocca, Lee and William Novak (1986 reissue). Iacocca: An Autobiography. Bantam. ISBN 0553251473
- Iacocca, Lee and Sonny Klenfield (1988) Talking Straight. Bantam. ISBN 0-553-05270-5
- Liberty for All, Peter B. Kaplan, Lee Iacocca, Barbara Grazzini, 2002 ISBN 0966333713
- Iacocca, Lee (2007). Where Have All the Leaders Gone. Scribner. ISBN 978-1-4165-3247-7.

=== Columns ===
- Iacocca, Lee (1982), How to Cut Interest Rates, Newsweek
- Iacocca, Lee (1983), Sacrifice and Pay Back Billions Now, Los Angles Times
- Iacocca, Lee (1986), Goals, not Gestures, for U.S.-Japan Trade, Los Angles Times
- Iacocca, Lee (1987), Preying on Business is Un-American: Wall Street Manipulators are Causing Paralysis, Not Reform, Los Angles Times
- Iacocca, Lee (1987), Let’s Tell the World: We’re Not Trade Patsies Anymore, Los Angles Times
- Iacocca, Lee (1989), From Toshiba to Trucks, We’re Being Run Over by Foreign Lobbies, Los Angles Times
- Iacocca, Lee (1989), What They Die For, We Burn, Los Angles Times
- Iacocca, Lee (1990), We Can’t Even Throw the Rascals Out: Congress: What does it mean incumbents getting reelected? That we’re pleased with their work?, Los Angles Times

== See also ==
- Ford Mustang Iacocca Silver 45th Anniversary Edition
- Ford Carousel garageable van project

Business positions
Preceded by Semon Knudsen	President of the Ford Motor Company; December 10, 1970–July 13, 1978	Succeeded by Philip Caldwell
Preceded by John J. Riccardo	President of the Chrysler Corporation; November 2, 1978–January 14, 1991	Succeeded by Bob Lutz
Preceded by John J. Riccardo	Chairman and CEO of the Chrysler Corporation; September 20, 1979–December 31, 1992	Succeeded by Robert James Eaton
