= Moshe Waldoks =

American rabbi

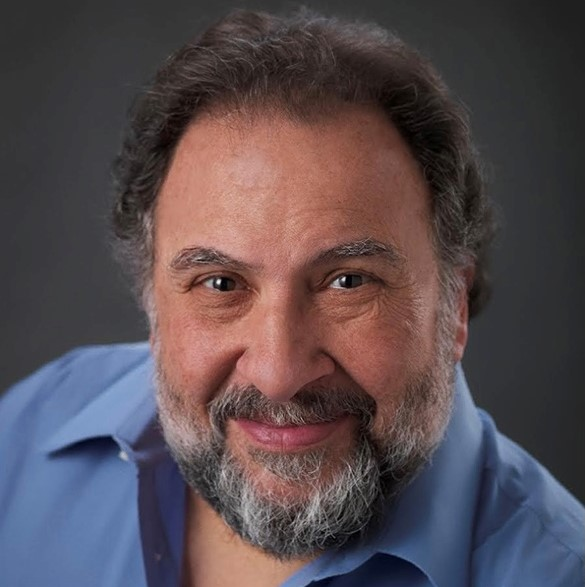
- Born: July 17, 1949 (age 76); Toledo, Ohio, United States
- Education: New York University; Hebrew University; Brandeis University

Moshe Waldoks is an American rabbi who co-edited The Big Book of Jewish Humor.

== Background and Family ==
Waldoks was born on July 17, 1949, in Toledo, Ohio to Holocaust survivors who arrived from displaced person's camps surrounding Munich two weeks earlier. His father Yidel, a native of the Vohlynia, Western Ukraine city of Lutzk and its environs, was a sole survivor of a large nuclear and extended family. Yidel's wife and daughter perished in the wake of the Einsatzgruppen, the Nazi mobile killing units that entered Poland in 1941. His mother, Bronia Lipnicka, was from Sosnowitz in Upper Silesia that was annexed into the Reich immediately after the invasion of Poland on September 1, 1939. She, her mother and one sister survived a large nuclear and extended family in a Nazi labor camp in Czechoslovakia.

Waldoks was raised in a Yiddish speaking home and was enrolled in Yiddish speaking yeshivot for his primary and part of his early high school education - Yeshiva of Eastern Parkway and BTA, Brooklyn Talmudical Academy, a high school associated with Yeshiva University.

Waldoks is married to Anne Pomerantz Waldoks, a clinical psychologist, and is the father of 3 daughters.

== Education ==
Waldoks attended the Washington Square campus of NYU from 1966 to 1968 and then completed undergraduate studies at the Hebrew University in Jerusalem, where he studied The History of Jewish Thought. In 1971, he entered into a doctoral program at Brandeis University in the department of Near East and Jewish studies. He completed his doctorate in 1984, with a dissertation on Hillel Zeitlin, a Warsaw-based Yiddish journalist, Hebrew writer and mystic who was murdered by the Nazis in 1942.

== Career ==
Upon his arrival in Boston in 1971, Waldoks became engaged in community activism and served on numerous boards of Jewish organizations. He was on the executive committee of the Jewish Community Relations Council for 17 years. From 1974 to 1977, while a graduate student, Waldoks helped establish a full time position as Hillel Director at Tufts University. From 1979 to 1986, he taught Jewish studies at Clark University in Worcester, MA and served in many adjunct positions at Colleges and Universities in the Boston area.

In 1981 he, along with-co-editor William Novak, published THE BIG BOOK OF JEWISH HUMOR (HarperCollins). A 25th anniversary edition with additional material was published in 2006. In 1994, Waldoks co-edited the Best of American Humor (Simon & Schuster). From 1982 to 1990, Waldoks produced close to two hundred cable television programs for the then early pre-internet years of community cable stations. This series named Aleph was the first Jewish television show in the Boston area. From 1986 to 1998, Waldoks traveled and performed as a stand-up comedian, storyteller, philosopher and sage for over 100 communities in the United States and Canada. He also performed at National conferences and many fundraising events.

Since 1974, Waldoks has been heavily involved in interfaith relations. First with the Christian, particularly the Catholic, community; later the Tibetan-Buddhist community, and in recent years with the Muslim community. In 1985, Waldoks visited the former Soviet Union to connect with Jewish "refusniks" who were held back from leaving the country for a variety of reasons, security and otherwise. In 1988, he participated in the Polish Bishops Conference in Tinietz, a monastery located in a Krakow suburb. This trip, sponsored by the ADL, was a groundbreaking opportunity to assess the situation of Jewish-Catholic relations in Poland that had hardly been influenced by the Vatican II encyclicals Nostra Aetate of 1965, when Pope John XXIII provided the most inclusive statement of the Church and the Jews. In 1989 and 1990 Waldoks was instrumental in helping to convene the first Jewish-Tibetan Dialogue with the Dalai Lama, first in the New York area and in the following year at the seat of the Tibetan government in Exile in Dharamsala, India. In 1999, Waldoks participated as one of the Jewish leaders in a Catholic-Jewish pilgrimage to Israel and Rome sponsored by the New England Region of the Anti-Defamation League.

In 1996, Waldoks was ordained as a non-denominational Rabbi by his mentors Rabbis Zalman- Schachter-Shalomi, Everett Gendler, and Arthur Green. In 1998, he took on the transformation of a moribund synagogue, Temple Beth Zion, in Brookline, Massachusetts and was successful over the next 21 years in creating a community rebranded as TBZ, of which he became founding rabbi, serving on a part-time basis.

In 2008 Waldoks was named by Newsweek magazine as one of the top 25 pulpit rabbis in the United States.
