= William Novak =

American author

William Novak (born 1948) is an American author who has co-written or ghostwritten numerous celebrity memoirs for people including Lee Iacocca, Nancy Reagan, and Magic Johnson. He is also the editor, with Moshe Waldoks, of The Big Book of Jewish Humor. He has also written several "private" books, which he described in a 2015 essay for The New York Times.

He is the father of actor and writer B. J. Novak and composer Jesse Novak. He is Jewish.

== Books ==
- High Culture: Marijuana in the Lives of Americans. New York: Alfred A. Knopf, 1980, ISBN 9780394503950
- The Great American Man Shortage and Other Roadblocks to Romance (and What to Do About It). New York: Rawson Associates, 1983, ISBN 0892562307
- Lee A. Iacocca with William Novak, Iacocca: An Autobiography. New York: Bantam Books, 1984, ISBN 9780553050677
- Sydney Biddle Barrows with William Novak, Mayflower Madam: The Secret Life of Sydney Biddle Barrows, New York: Arbor House, 1986, ISBN 0877957223
- Herb Schmertz with William Novak. Good-Bye to the Low Profile: The Art of Creative Confrontation, Boston: Little, Brown, 1986, ISBN 0316773662
- Tip O'Neill with William Novak, Man of the House: The Life and Political Memoirs of Speaker Tip O'Neill, New York: Random House, 1987, ISBN 0394552016
- Nancy Reagan with William Novak, My Turn: The Memoirs of Nancy Reagan. New York: Random House, 1989, ISBN 0394563689
- Earvin "Magic" Johnson with William Novak, My Life, New York: Random House, 1992, ISBN 0679415696
- Oliver L. North with William Novak, Under Fire: An American Story, New York: HarperCollins, ISBN 0060183349
- Claire Sylvia with William Novak, A Change of Heart: A Memoir, Boston: Little, Brown, 1997, ISBN 0316821497
- An Incredible Dream: Ralph Roberts and the Story of Comcast. Philadelphia: Comcast Corporation, 2012, ISBN 9781451675351
- Max Kargman with William Novak, The Education of Max Kargman, Boston: Foundation Books, 2003.
- Susan Whitman Helfgot with William Novak, The Match: Complete Strangers, A Miracle Face Transplant, Two Lives Transformed, New York: Simon & Schuster, 2010, ISBN 9781439195482

=== As editor ===
- William Novak and Moshe Waldoks, The Big Book of Jewish Humor. New York: Harper & Row, 1981, ISBN 9780060148942
- William Novak and Moshe Waldoks with Donald Altschiller, The Big Book of New American Humor: The Best of the Past 25 Years. New York: HarperPerennial, 1990, ISBN 9780060965518
- Die Laughing: Killer Jokes for Newly Old Folks, New York: Touchstone, 2016, ISBN 9781501150791
