= Frédéric Sessa =

French freediver

Frédéric Sessa (Sète 1985) is a French free-diver. Between 10 July 2010 and 2 September 2010, he held the world record in Dynamic with Fins DYN (Free-diving discipline recognised by AIDA International), with 255 meters.
