= Hôtel de Ville, Sète =

Town hall in Sète, France

Hôtel de Ville
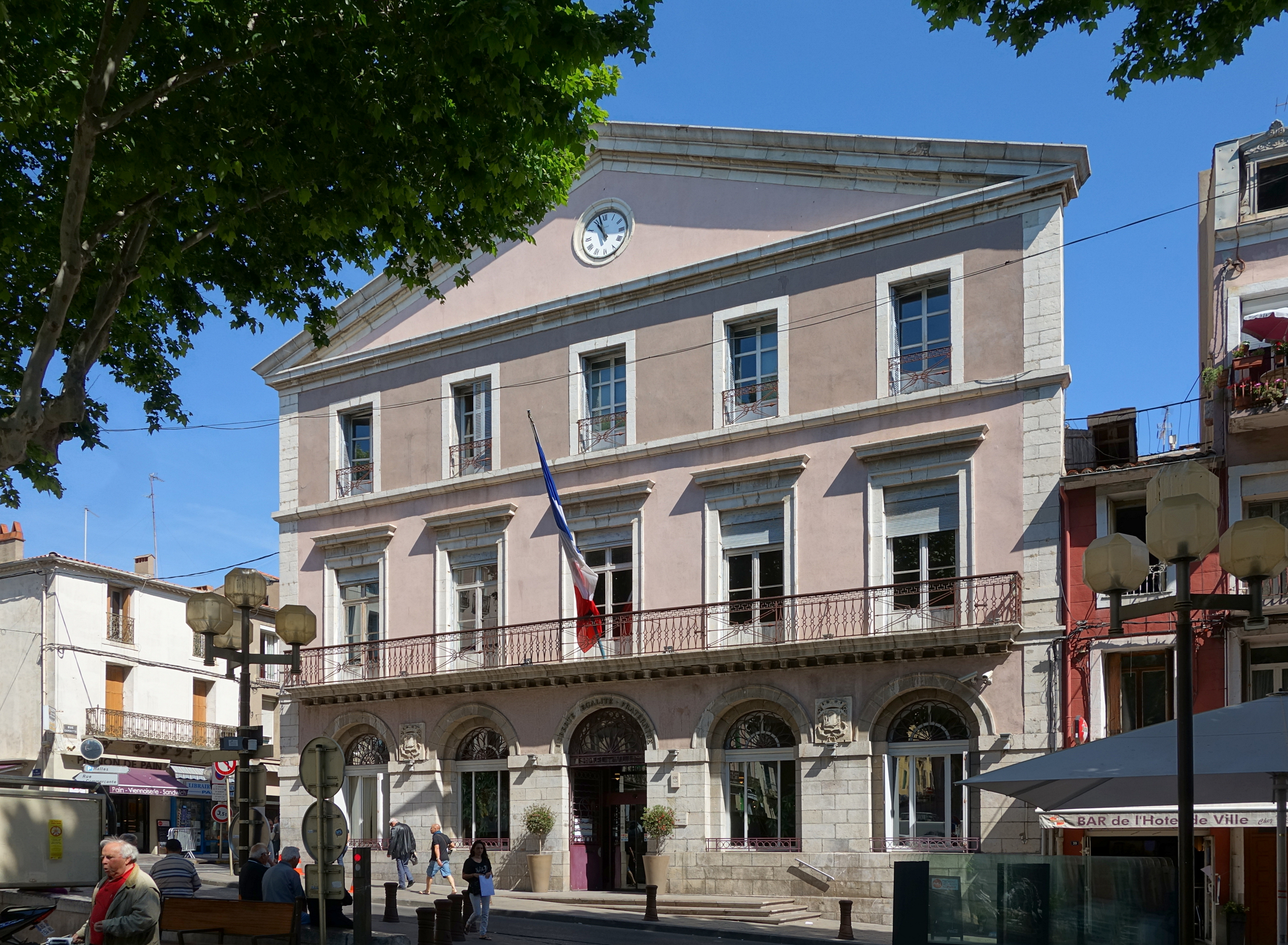
- The main frontage of the Hôtel de Ville in June 2014
- Interactive map of the Hôtel de Ville area

General information
- Type: City hall
- Architectural style: Neoclassical style
- Location: Sète, France
- Coordinates: 43.4020°N 3.6958°E
- Completed: 1719

The Hôtel de Ville (French pronunciation: [otɛl də vil], City Hall) is a municipal building in Sète, Hérault, in southern France, standing on Rue Paul Valéry.

== History ==
After the port of Sète was established in 1666, a series of developments took place around the quayside. These included the consecration of the Church of Saint-Louis in 1703, and a series of residential properties one of which was commissioned by the local prosecutor, Sieur Marcha. The site he selected was on the north side of what is now Rue Paul Valéry. The building was designed in the neoclassical style, built in brick with a stucco finish and was completed in 1719.

The design involved a symmetrical main frontage of five bays facing onto Rue Paul Valéry. The central bay featured a round headed opening with a moulded surround. The other bays on the ground floor contained round headed windows with moulded surrounds, while the first floor featured five French doors and a full-width balcony fronted by iron railings. The second floor was fenestrated by casement windows with stone surrounds and, at roof level, there was a pediment with a clock in the tympanum.

The building remained in residential use until 1723, when it was acquired by the town council for municipal use. A programme of conversion works was then instigated which allowed the ground floor to be used as an assembly hall until 1887. The building also accommodated the local savings bank from 1838 until that part of the building was redeployed as a police station in 1884.

Following the liberation of the town by French Forces of the Interior on 21 August 1944, during the Second World War, local people gathered under the balcony of the town hall to celebrate their newly found freedom.

A monumental fountain referred to as "La Pouffre" was inaugurated in the square in front of the town hall on 14 March 1869. It was removed in the 1960s and replaced by a car park. However, in the early 1980s, the mayor, Yves Marchand, decided to remove the car park, and to commission a new fountain with a similar style. The new fountain depicted an octopus surrounded by dolphins which spouted water. It was designed by Pierre Nocca and inaugurated in 1987.
