= Sète =

Administrative division in Occitania, France

Sète Seta (Occitan)
- Commune
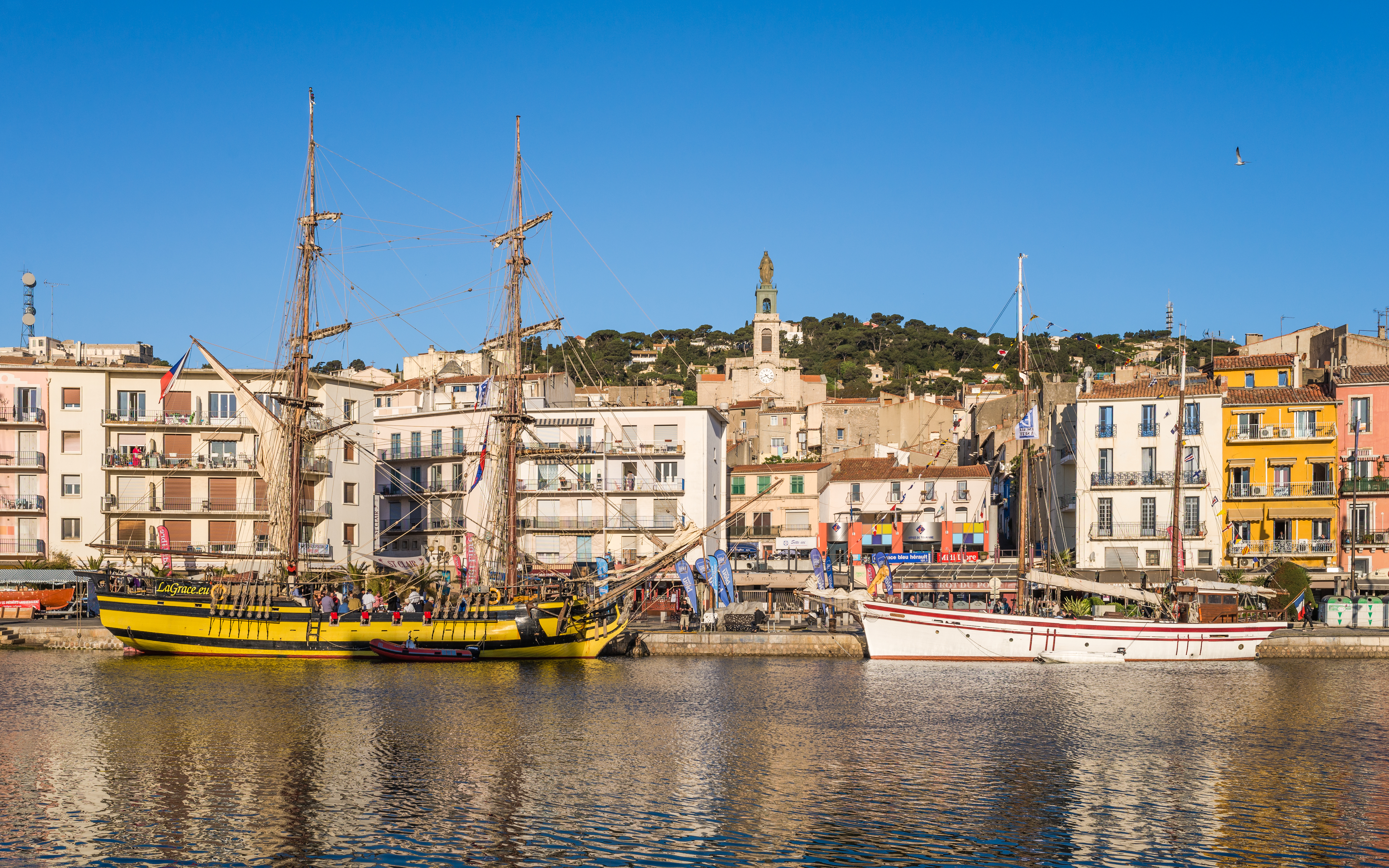
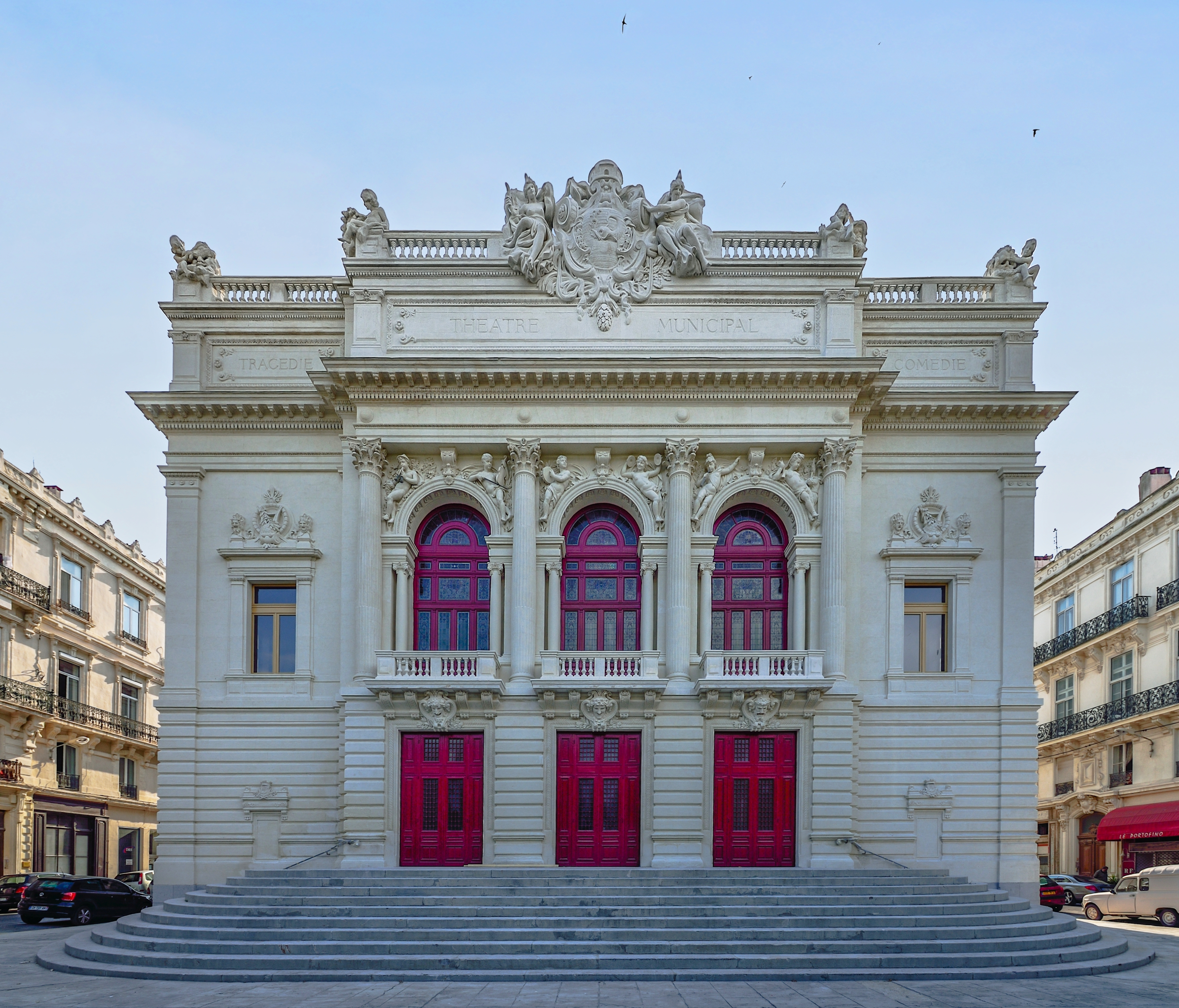
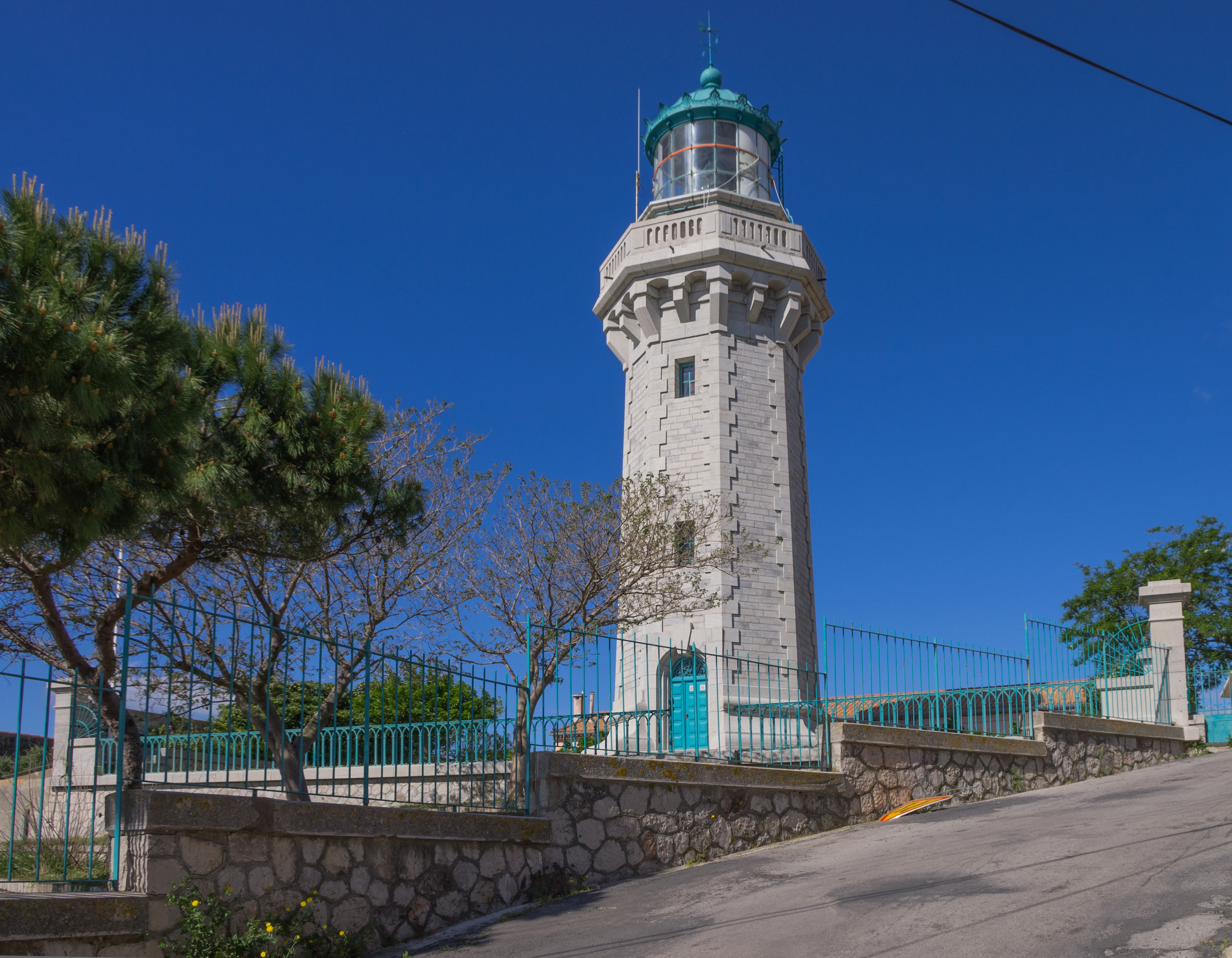
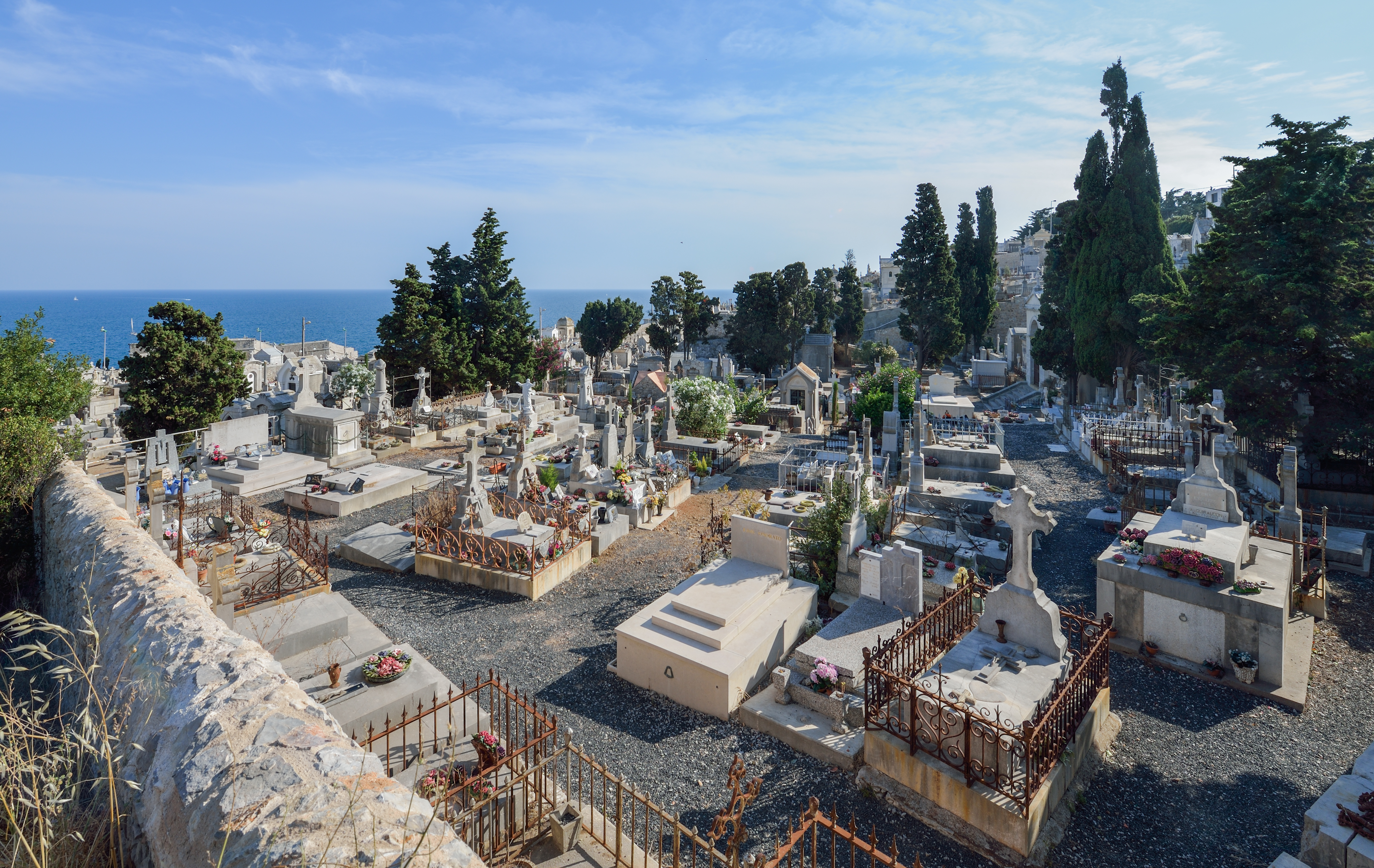
- Clockwise from top: The Royal Canal, the Mont Saint-Clair lighthouse, the Sète naval cemetery, and the Molière theatre.

- Coat of arms
- Location of Sète
- Location within France Location within Occitanie
- Coordinates: 43°24′19″N 3°41′51″E
- Country: France
- Region: Occitania
- Department: Hérault
- Arrondissement: Montpellier
- Canton: Sète
- Intercommunality: CA Sète Agglopôle Méditerranée

Government
  - Mayor (2025–2026): Hervé Marquès (DVD)
- Area^{1}: 24.21 km^{2} (9.35 sq mi)
- Elevation: 4 m (13 ft)
- Highest elevation: 176 m (577 ft)
- Lowest elevation: 0 m (0 ft)
- Population (2023): 45,337
  - Density: 1,873/km^{2} (4,850/sq mi)
- Demonym: Sétois
- Time zone: UTC+01:00 (CET)
  - Summer (DST): UTC+02:00 (CEST)
- INSEE/Postal code: 34301 /34200
- ^{1} French Land Register data, which excludes lakes, ponds, glaciers > 1 km^{2} (0.386 sq mi or 247 acres) and river estuaries.

Sète (French pronunciation: [sɛt]; Occitan: Seta, [ˈsetɔ]), also historically spelled Cette (official until 1928) and Sette, is a resort town and commune in the Hérault department, in the region of Occitania, southern France. Its inhabitants are called Sétois (male) and Sétoises (female) in French, "Setòris" and "Setòria" in Occitan.

Known as the Venice of Languedoc and the singular island (in Paul Valéry's words), it is a port and a seaside resort on the Mediterranean with its own cultural identity, traditions, cuisine and dialect. It is the hometown of such artists as Paul Valéry, Maurice-Elie Sarthou, Jean Vilar, Georges Brassens, Hervé Di Rosa, Manitas de Plata, and Robert Combas. Since May 12, 2025, Hervé Marquès is the mayor of the city.

== Geography ==
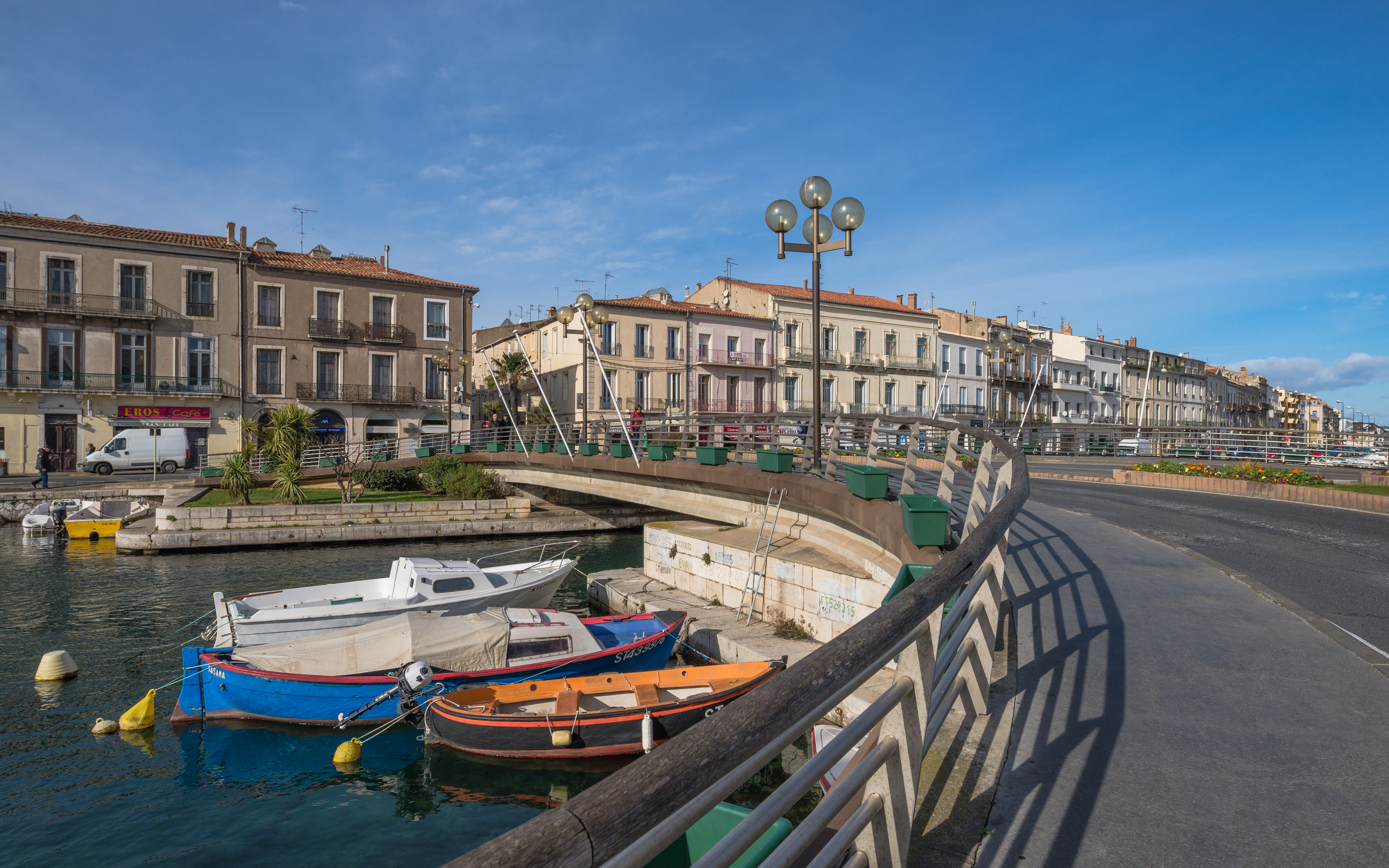
Virla Bridge

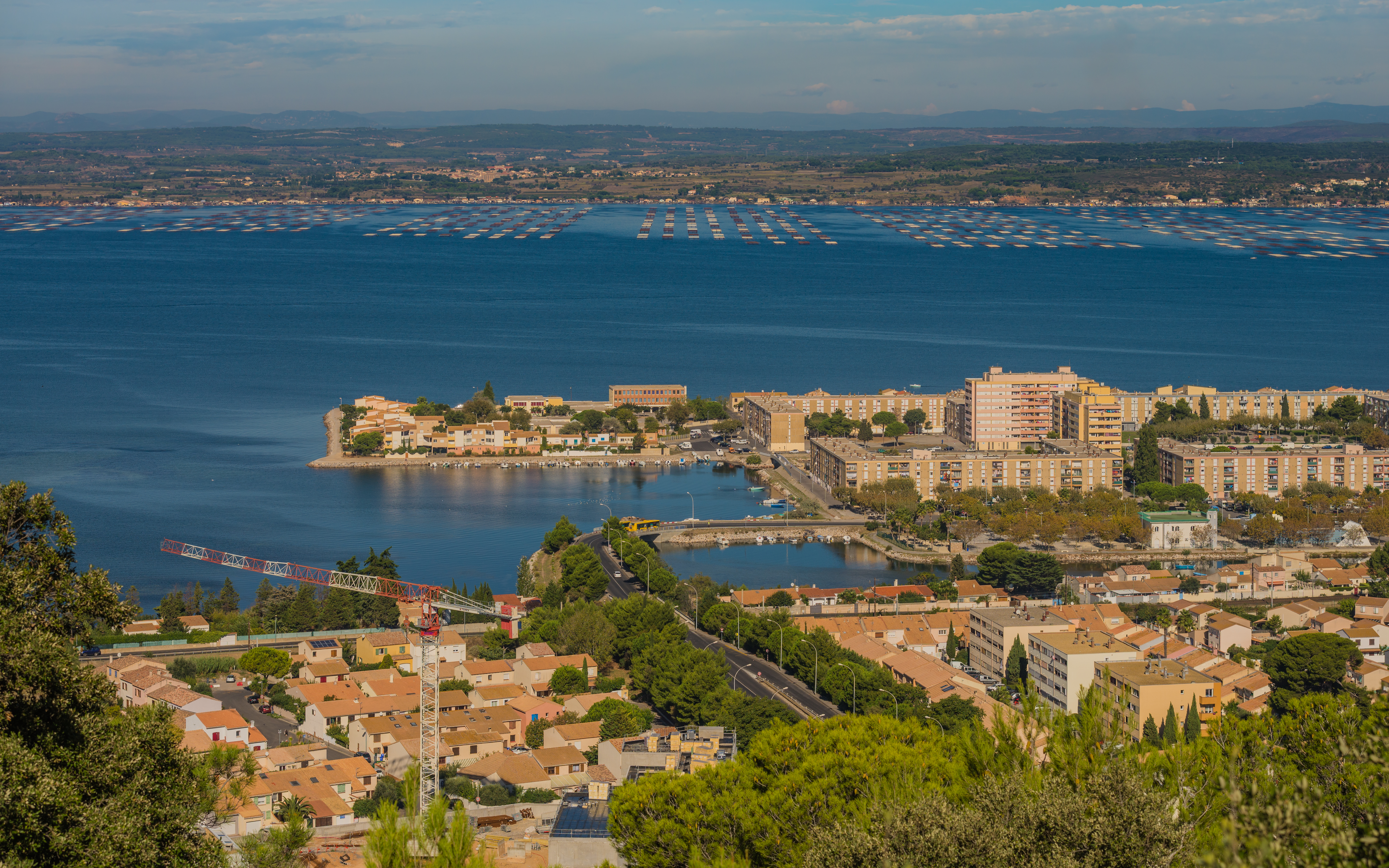
Southwestern part of the Île de Thau neighbourhood and the Étang de Thau

Built upon and around Mont St Clair, Sète is situated on the south-eastern end of the Étang de Thau, an enclosed salt water lake used primarily for oyster and mussel fields. To its other side lies the Mediterranean, and the town has a network of canals which are links between the Étang de Thau and the Mediterranean Sea.

=== Climate ===
Sète has a mediterranean climate (Köppen climate classification Csa). The average annual temperature in Sète is 15.4 °C (59.7 °F). The average annual rainfall is 560.7 mm (22.07 in) with October as the wettest month. The temperatures are highest on average in August, at around 23.9 °C (75.0 °F), and lowest in January, at around 8.0 °C (46.4 °F). The highest temperature ever recorded in Sète was 41.0 °C (105.8 °F) on 12 August 1923; the coldest temperature ever recorded was −12.0 °C (10.4 °F) on 10 February 1956.

Climate data for Sète (1981–2010 averages, extremes 1920−present)
Month	Jan	Feb	Mar	Apr	May	Jun	Jul	Aug	Sep	Oct	Nov	Dec	Year
Record high °C (°F)	20.2 (68.4)	21.8 (71.2)	27.1 (80.8)	31.0 (87.8)	34.6 (94.3)	40.3 (104.5)	37.8 (100.0)	41.0 (105.8)	34.2 (93.6)	32.1 (89.8)	25.4 (77.7)	20.4 (68.7)	41.0 (105.8)
Mean daily maximum °C (°F)	10.8 (51.4)	11.6 (52.9)	14.6 (58.3)	16.9 (62.4)	20.6 (69.1)	24.9 (76.8)	27.8 (82.0)	27.4 (81.3)	23.7 (74.7)	19.3 (66.7)	14.3 (57.7)	11.4 (52.5)	18.6 (65.5)
Daily mean °C (°F)	8.0 (46.4)	8.6 (47.5)	11.3 (52.3)	13.5 (56.3)	17.2 (63.0)	21.2 (70.2)	23.9 (75.0)	23.7 (74.7)	20.3 (68.5)	16.5 (61.7)	11.6 (52.9)	8.8 (47.8)	15.4 (59.7)
Mean daily minimum °C (°F)	5.3 (41.5)	5.5 (41.9)	7.9 (46.2)	10.1 (50.2)	13.8 (56.8)	17.4 (63.3)	20.0 (68.0)	19.9 (67.8)	16.8 (62.2)	13.6 (56.5)	9.0 (48.2)	6.2 (43.2)	12.2 (54.0)
Record low °C (°F)	−11.0 (12.2)	−12.0 (10.4)	−6.2 (20.8)	1.2 (34.2)	4.2 (39.6)	6.5 (43.7)	12.0 (53.6)	11.0 (51.8)	6.0 (42.8)	2.4 (36.3)	−1.8 (28.8)	−7.2 (19.0)	−12.0 (10.4)
Average precipitation mm (inches)	51.4 (2.02)	51.8 (2.04)	39.7 (1.56)	48.3 (1.90)	42.3 (1.67)	25.2 (0.99)	11.5 (0.45)	26.4 (1.04)	56.7 (2.23)	90.9 (3.58)	65.2 (2.57)	51.3 (2.02)	560.7 (22.07)
Average precipitation days (≥ 1.0 mm)	5.2	4.4	4.5	5.5	5.0	3.4	2.0	3.1	4.0	5.9	5.3	5.0	53.5
Average relative humidity (%)	76	74	70	70	72	69	66	68	74	76	75	76	72.2
Source 1: Météo France
Source 2: Infoclimat.fr (humidity and snowy days, 1961–1990)

== History ==
The name first appeared in Ptolemy (Geography II.10.2.): Σήτιον ὄρος, later in Avienius' (Ora Maritima): Setius... mons and on the maps of Aniane: fiscum..qui nuncupatur Sita

During the 11th century Catharism appeared in the Languedoc region.

=== 1600–1900 ===
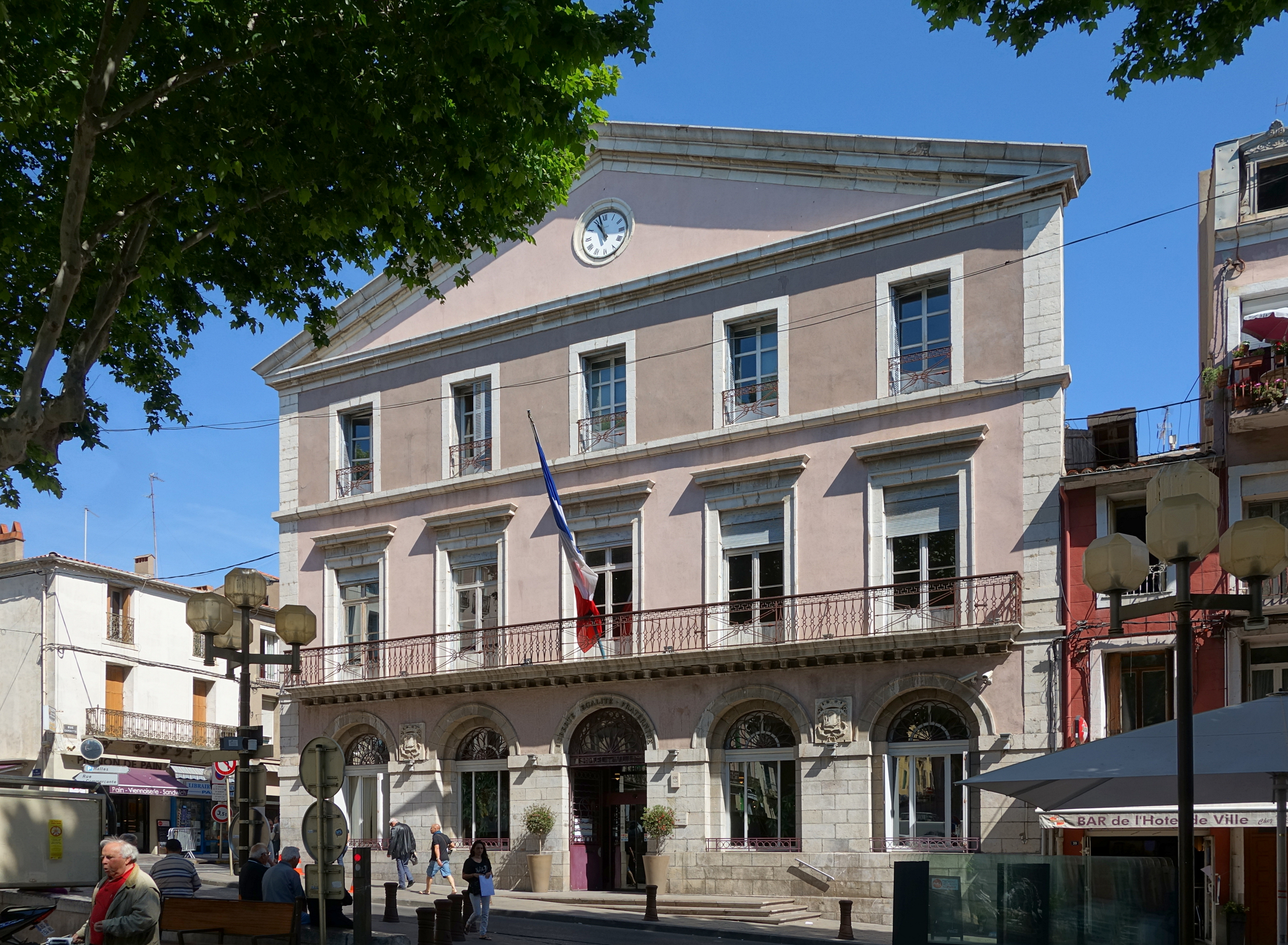
The Hôtel de Ville

On 29 July 1666, the first stone was officially set on the Saint-Louis pier. The Canal du Midi was completed in 1681 and Vauban visited the port in 1684. Saint-Louis church was consecrated in 1703. From 24 to 26 July 1710, during the War of the Spanish Succession the British attacked Sète, but were soon fought back by Adrien Maurice de Noailles, Duke of Noailles. Between 1710 and 1711, Saint-Pierre and Butte-Ronde forts were built.

The Hôtel de Ville was acquired in 1723 and the Richelieu citadel and the Castellas tower were built in 1744.

=== 19th century ===
Between 1807 and 1809 the British tried to burn the town. On 21 May 1821, the first stone of the breakwater was set (finished in 1869). On 9 June 1839 the Montpellier–Sète railway was opened. On 6 May 1872 the chamber of commerce was established. Between 1882 and 1888 construction works on the port took place. On 24 June 1894 Sante Geronimo Caserio, an Italian anarchist from Lombardy and apprentice baker in Sète stabbed to death president Sadi Carnot in Lyon. In 1895, the boys' high school, later renamed the Lycée Paul Valéry, was opened.

=== 20th century ===
In 1901 an electric tramway network was built (used until 1935). In 1902, the Nelson family opened Chateau Nelson. On 20 January 1928, the name of the town changed from Cette to Sète. In 1934, FC Sète 34 won the Ligue 1 and Coupe de France and became the first football club to win both the same year. On 23 May 1939: the SS Sinaia left the port with Spanish Republicans seeking asylum in Lázaro Cárdenas's Mexico. On 12 November 1942: the town was occupied by the German troops of the Wehrmacht. On 25 June 1944 Sète railway station, Balaruc-les-Bains's and Frontignan's oil refineries were bombarded by the American 15th Air Force. On 20 August 1944 Sète was liberated. On 11 July 1947, the packet steamship SS President Warfield leaves for Palestine with 4,530 Jews who survived the Shoah. The port official M. Leboutet had authorised captain Ike Aronowicz to sail to Colombia and, after five days on the Atlantic Ocean, the ship took the name SS Exodus and changed direction towards Palestine. 27 km (17 miles) from the coast, they were stopped by five British torpedo boats. 75 passengers accepted asylum in France, while the others were brought to Hamburg via Gibraltar. In 1960, the Théâtre de la Mer was built. In 1962, the technical college Joliot-Curie was opened. In 1966–1978 major construction works on the port took place. In 1970, the Museum Paul Valéry was opened. From 1981 to 1984, a new public hospital was built. On 31 October 1991, the espace Georges Brassens, a museum dedicated to the singer, opened.

=== 21st century ===
In 2004, a plan to preserve the Lido and prevent further coastal damage was made. In 2005 a new neighbourhood called Villeroy was created. In 2006 the "espace Georges Brassens" was renovated. In January 2007, the Languedoc-Roussillon manages the port of Sète. In 2014, une ville humanitaire, saw the creation of "les Anges de la Rue". In 2016, a great wine spill occurred at the Nelson Château.

== Population ==
Historical population

Year	Pop.	±% p.a.
1793	8,031	—
1800	6,984	−1.98%
1806	8,438	+3.20%
1821	9,061	+0.48%
1831	10,638	+1.62%
1836	11,648	+1.83%
1841	13,413	+2.86%
1846	19,041	+7.26%
1851	19,124	+0.09%
1856	21,064	+1.95%
1861	22,438	+1.27%
1866	24,177	+1.50%
1872	25,826	+1.11%
1876	28,690	+2.66%
1881	35,517	+4.36%
1886	37,058	+0.85%
1891	36,541	−0.28%
1896	32,729	−2.18%
1901	33,246	+0.31%

Year	Pop.	±% p.a.
1906	33,892	+0.39%
1911	33,049	−0.50%
1921	36,503	+1.00%
1926	37,005	+0.27%
1931	36,953	−0.03%
1936	37,324	+0.20%
1946	31,203	−1.78%
1954	33,454	+0.87%
1962	36,301	+1.03%
1968	40,476	+1.83%
1975	39,258	−0.44%
1982	39,545	+0.10%
1990	41,510	+0.61%
1999	39,542	−0.54%
2007	42,972	+1.05%
2012	44,558	+0.73%
2017	43,229	−0.60%
2023	45,337	+0.80%

Source: EHESS and INSEE (1968-2023)

== Patron saint ==
In 1703, when the Saint-Louis church was consecrated, Louis IX, patron of the port, also became the patron saint of the town. He has been celebrated every year on 25 August, with canal jousting competitions, music and fireworks, except during wartime.

== Transport ==
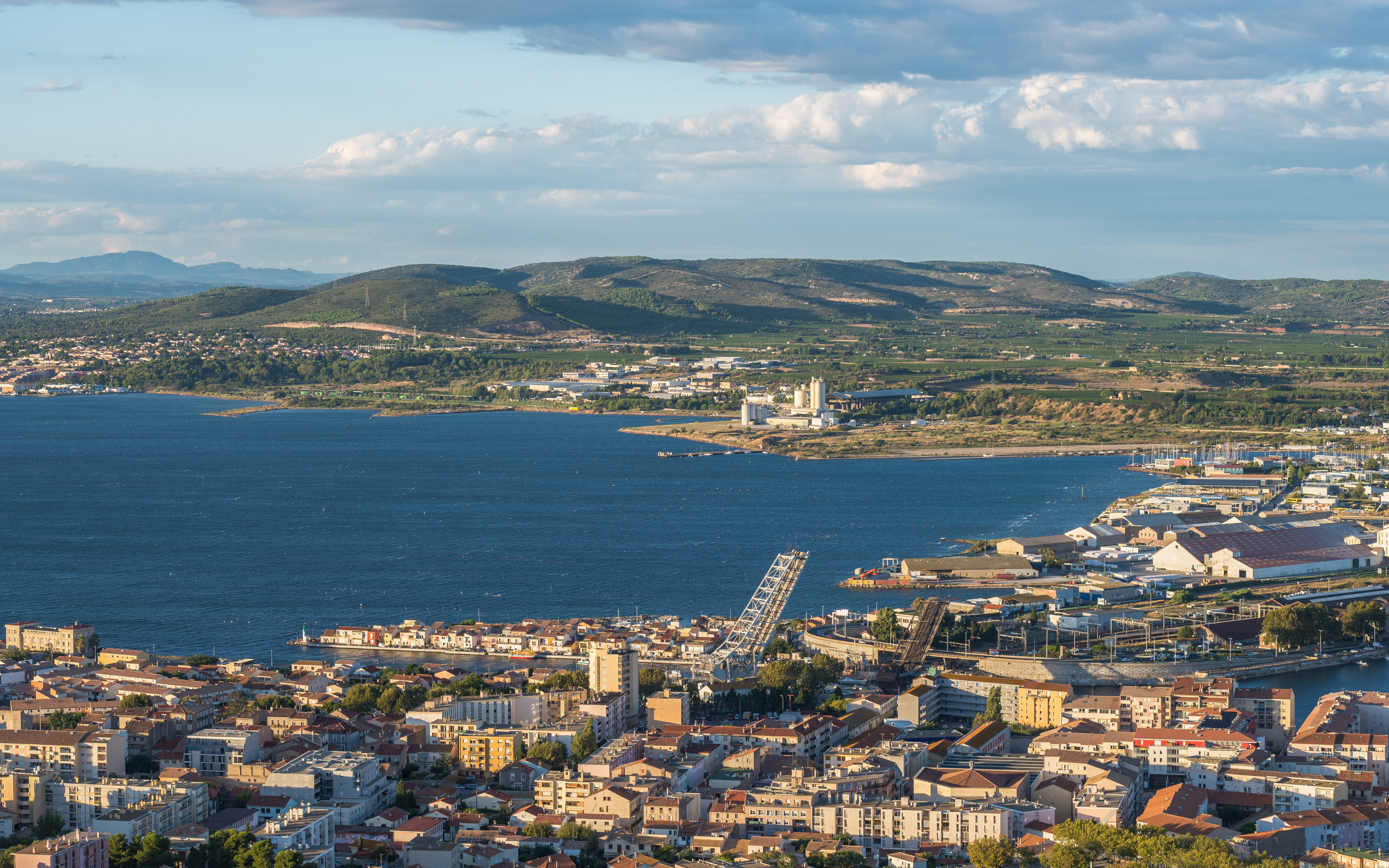
Sète and the Étang de Thau

Sète is the eastern starting point of the Canal du Midi, and the ending point of the Canal du Rhône à Sète. Its train station Gare de Sète is approximately 20 minutes by train from Montpellier, and is also served by long-distance trains to Bordeaux, Toulouse, Marseille and Paris. Car ferries sail between Sète and Morocco.

== Culture ==
Sète is a centre of water jousting, and hosts a major tournament during the town festival, the St-Louis.

Paul Valéry's poem Le Cimetière Marin, depicts the graveyard above Sète's harbour. Valéry is buried in the graveyard, and the nearby Paul Valéry Museum contains a collection of his drawings and manuscripts.

Espace Georges-Brassens is a museum dedicated to the Sétois singer-songwriter.

Agnès Varda's first film, La Pointe Courte, was filmed in the environs of Sète.

Director Abdellatif Kechiche set his 2007 film The Secret of the Grain, Mektoub, My Love: Canto Uno (2017) and Mektoub, My Love: Intermezzo (2019) in Sète.

The 2010 French romantic comedy film Beautiful Lies, directed by Pierre Salvadori and starring Audrey Tautou, was mostly shot in Sète.

== Notable people ==
Sète was the birthplace of:

- David Serene (born 1970), footballer and veterinarian
- Paul Valéry (1871–1945), author and poet of the Symbolist school
- Paul-Marie Masson (1882–1954), composer and musicologist
- Jean Vilar (1912–1971), actor and creator of the Avignon theatre festival
- Georges Brassens (1921–1981), singer and songwriter
- Manitas de Plata (1921–2014), flamenco guitarist
- Gilbert Py (born 1933), Opera tenor
- Ives Roqueta (1933-2015), writer and occitan activist
- Alain de Pouzilhac (born 1945), CEO of France 24 and former president of France Médias Monde
- Simon Sutour (born 1952), Senator of the department Gard
- Robert Combas (born 1957), sculptor and painter
- Hervé Di Rosa (born 1959), painter and sculptor
- Nathalie Ferlut (born 1968), comics cartoonist
- David Darmon (born 1975), footballer
- Mathieu Peisson (born 1982), water polo player and Olympian at the 2016 Summer Olympics
- Frédéric Sessa (born 1985), free-diver
- Valentine Schlegel (1925-2021), French sculptor and ceramicist.
- Fidji Simo (born 1985), CEO of AGI Deployment at OpenAI

Other famous inhabitants include:

- Agnès Varda (1928-2019), film director

== International relations ==
Sète is twinned with:

- Neuburg an der Donau, Germany, since 1986
- El Jadida, Morocco, since 1992
- Cetara, Italy, since 2003

== Gallery ==
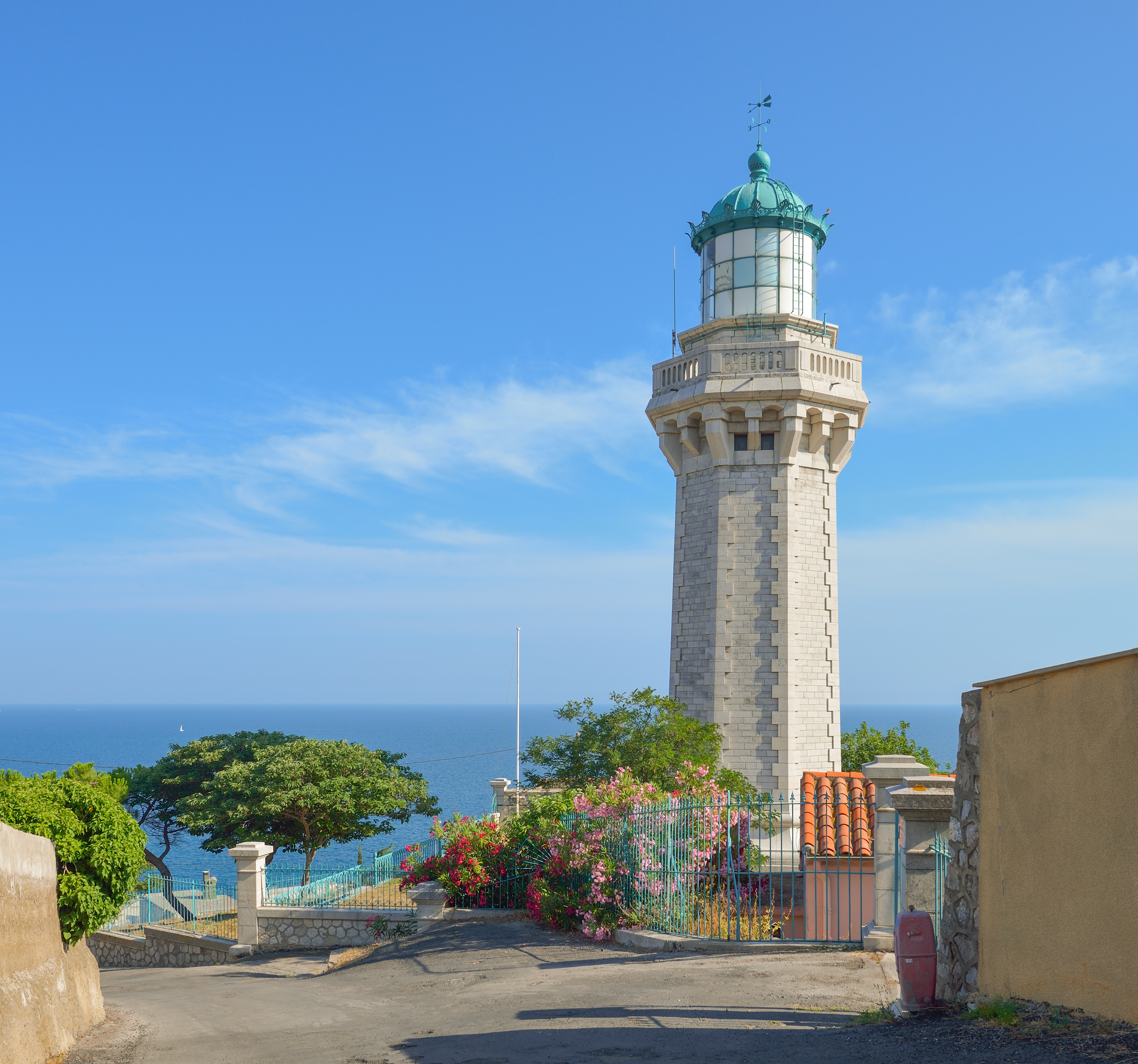
Lighthouse of the Mount Saint-Clair

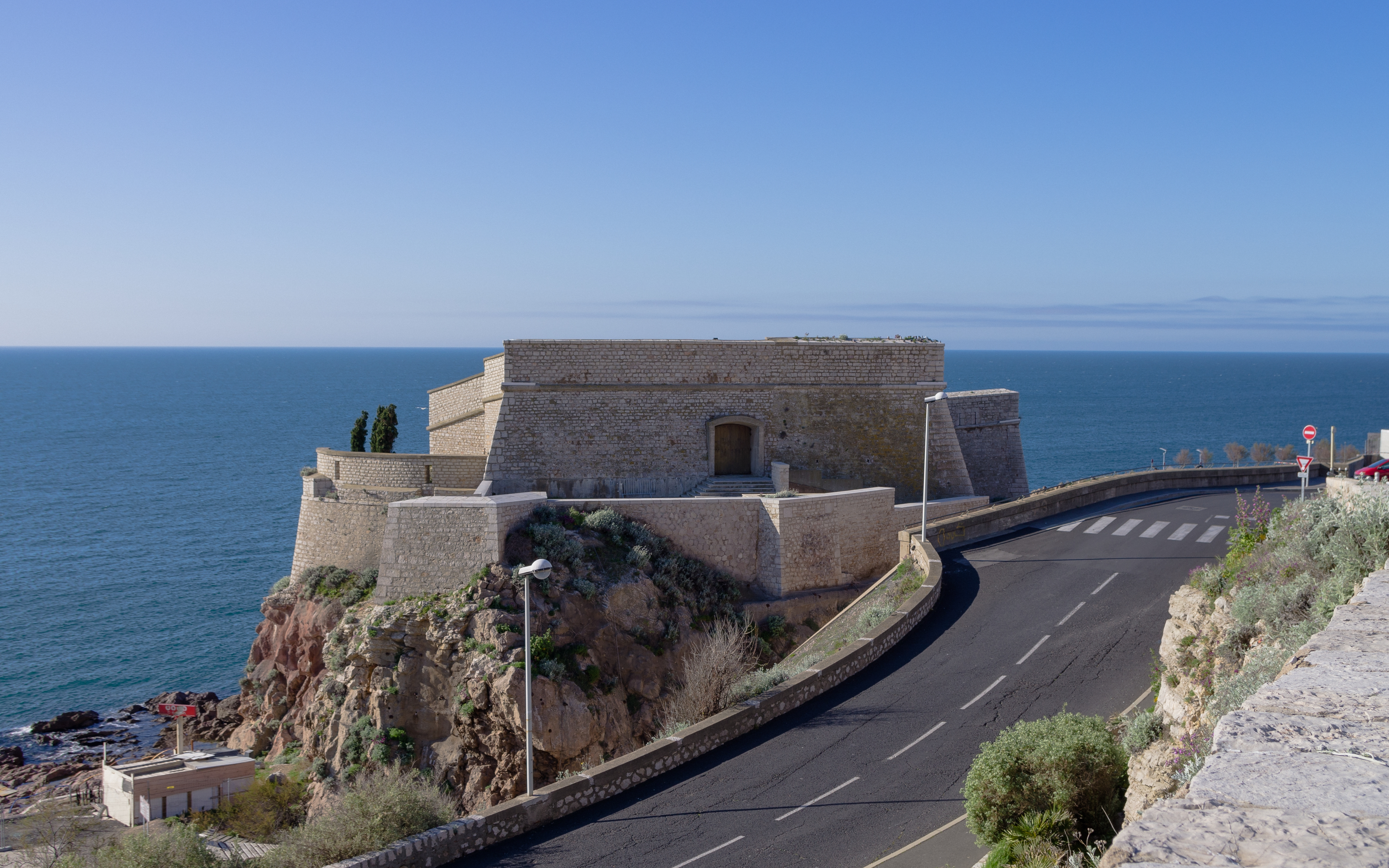
Théatre de la Mer.

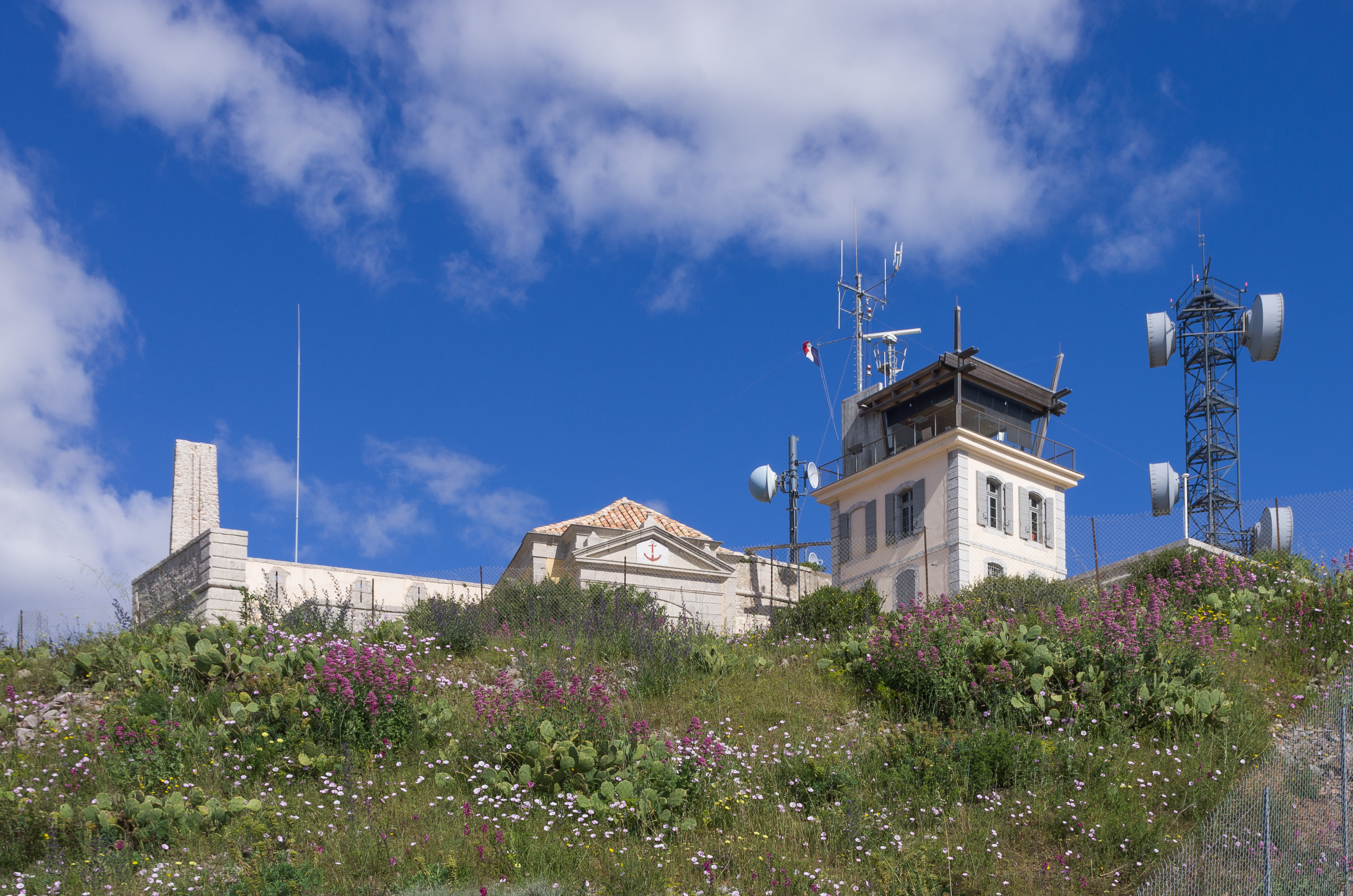
Fort Richelieu.

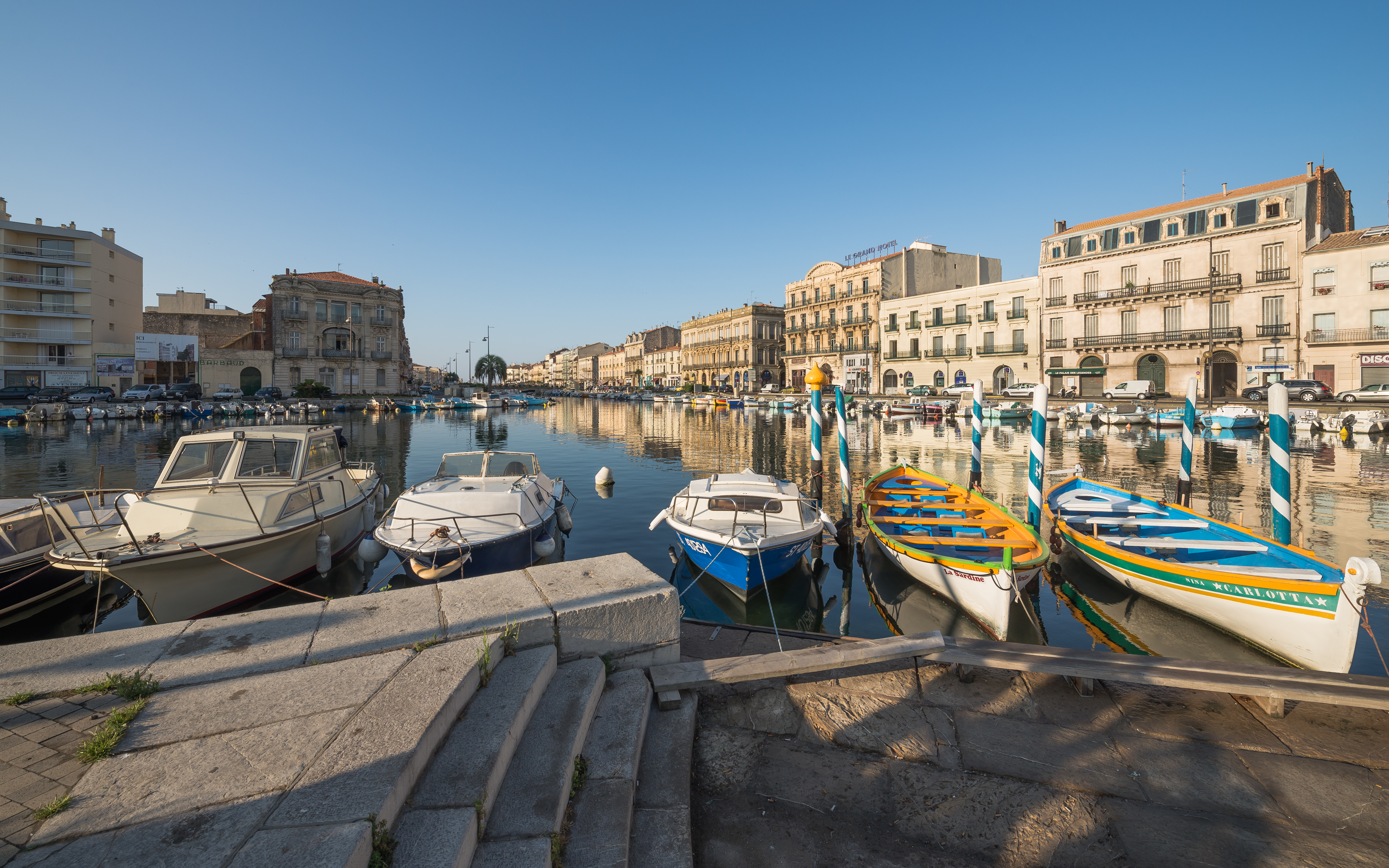
Maréchal de Lattre de Tassigny Embankment.

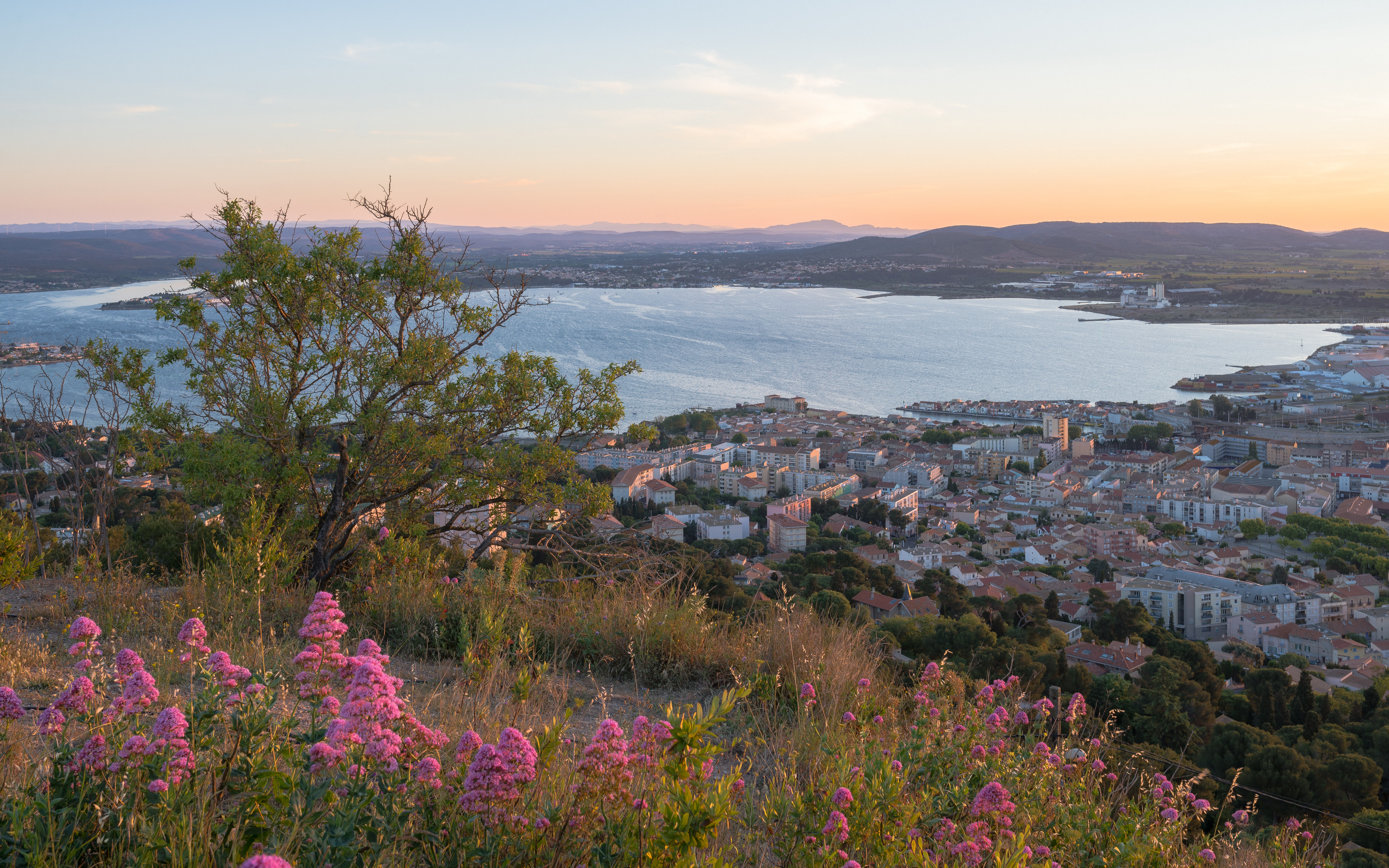
Sète and the Étang de Thau.

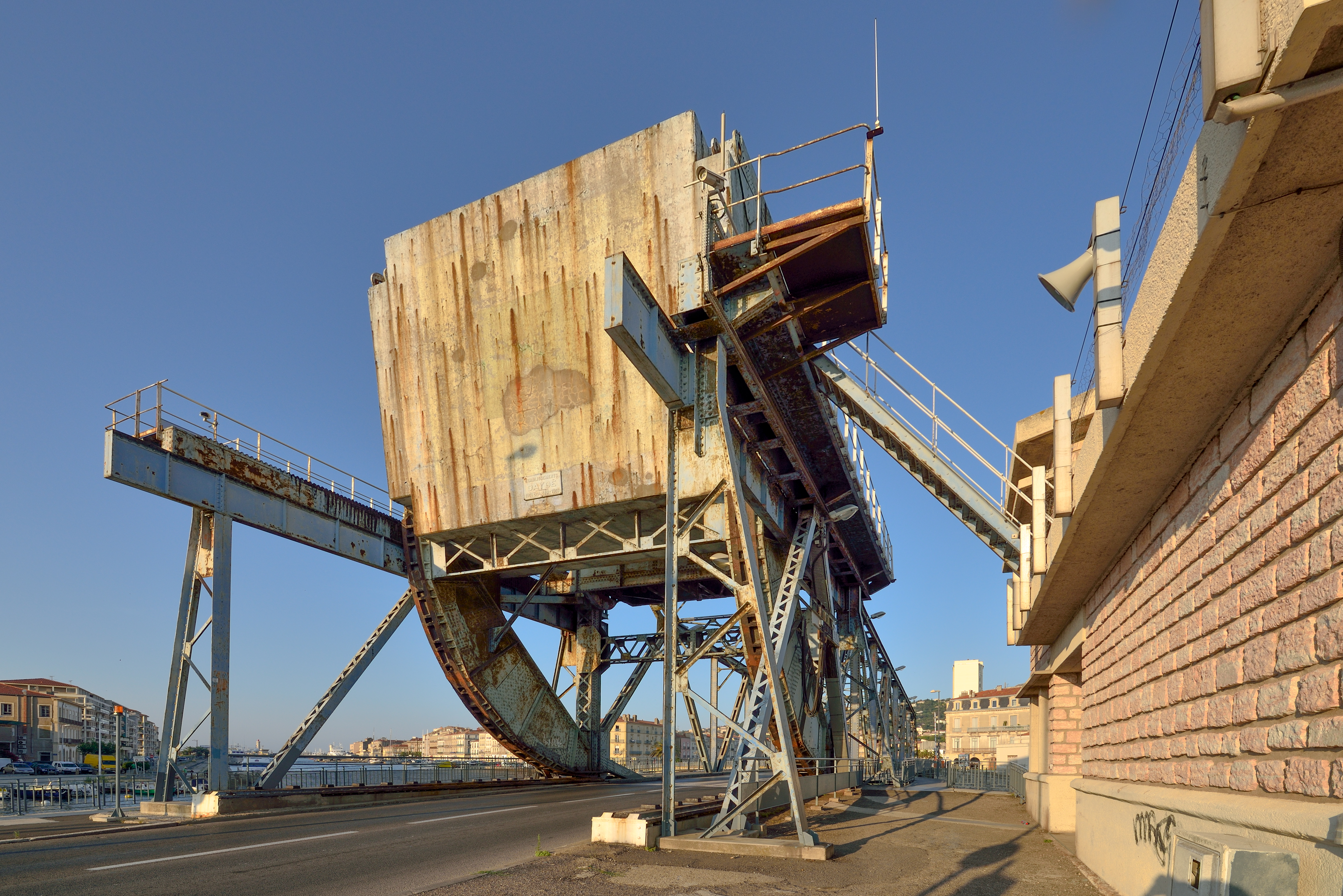
Tivoli Bridge over one of the canals of the town.

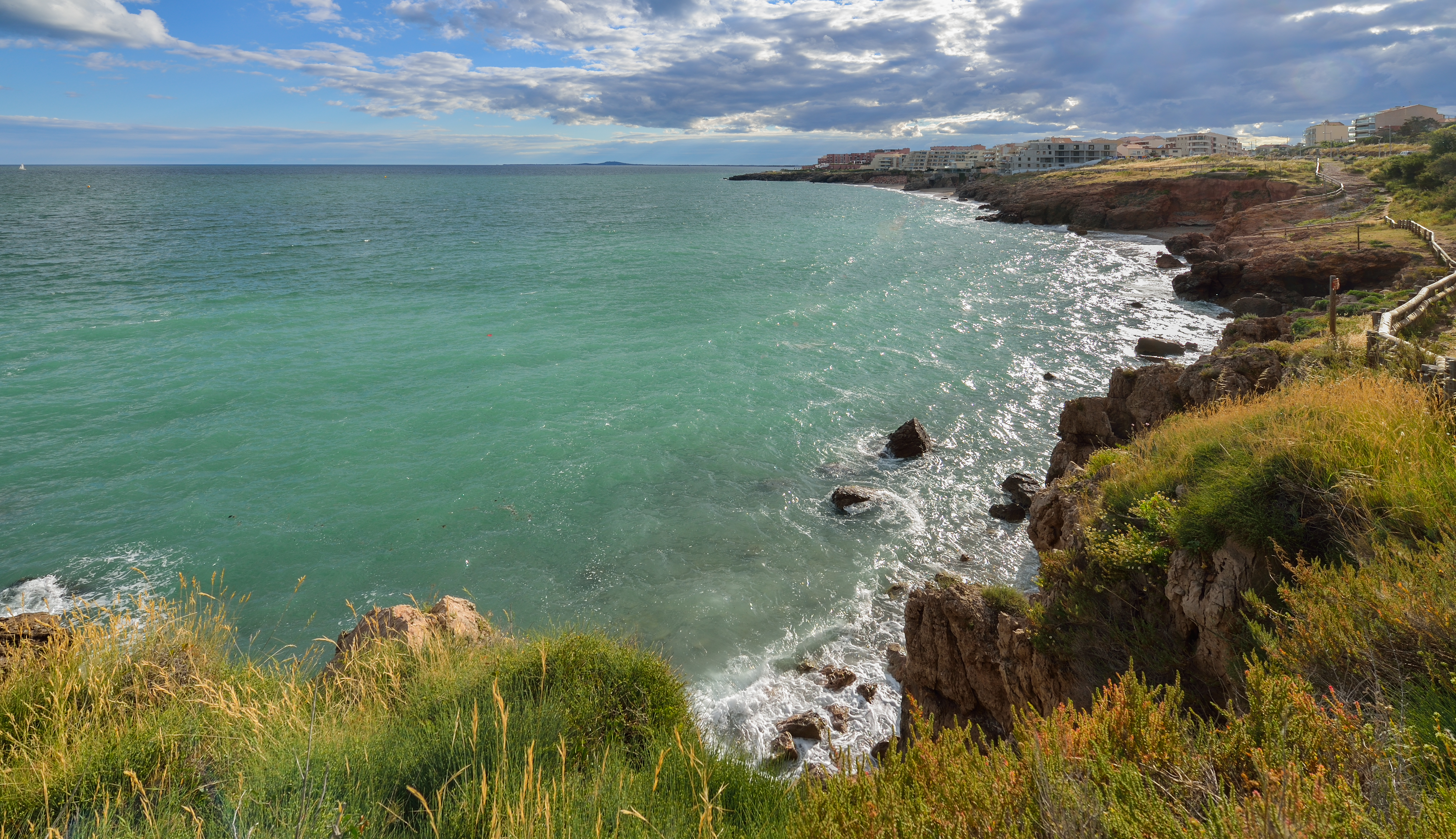
Crique de l'Anau, a cove in the Mediterranean Sea.

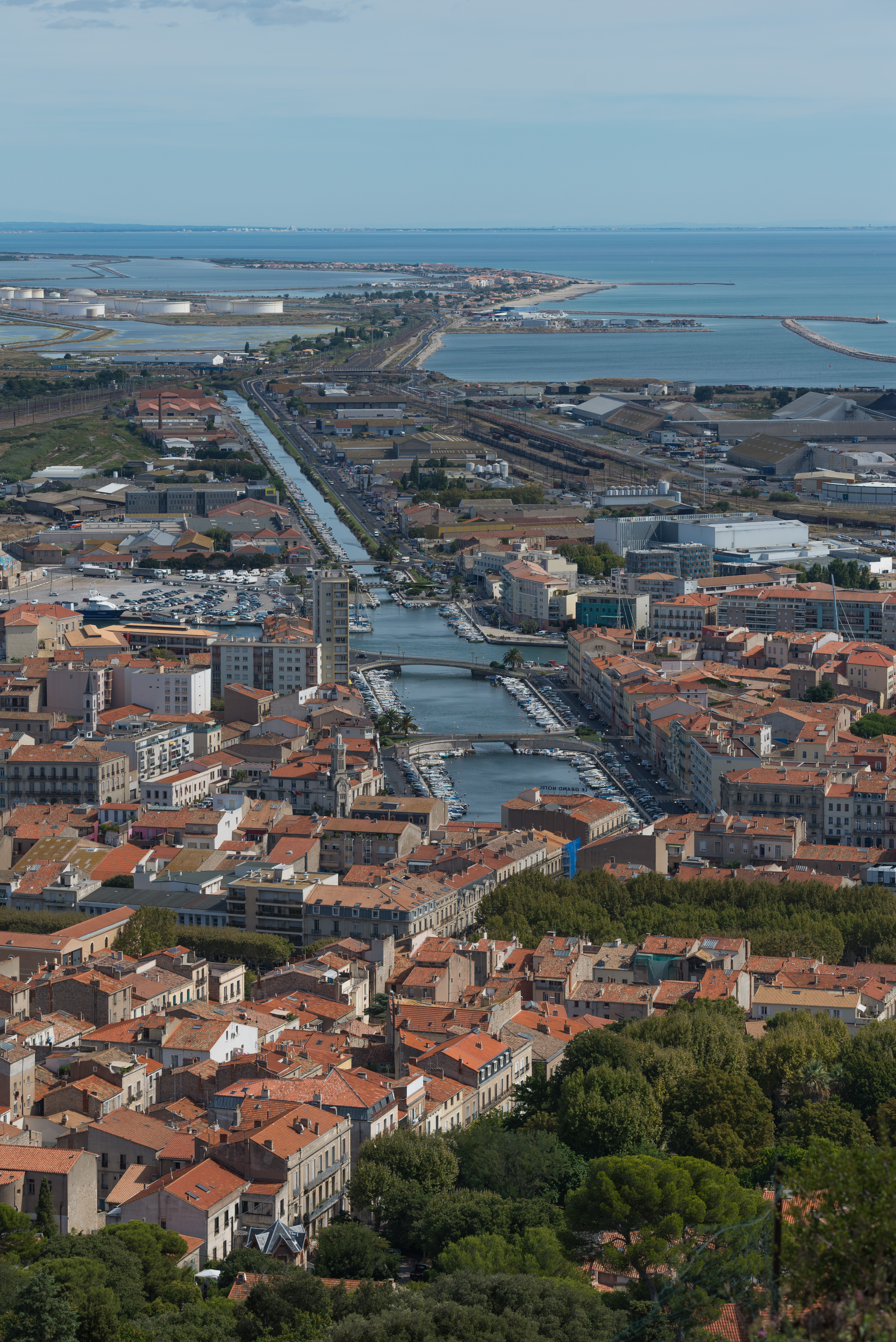
Canal de la Peyrade

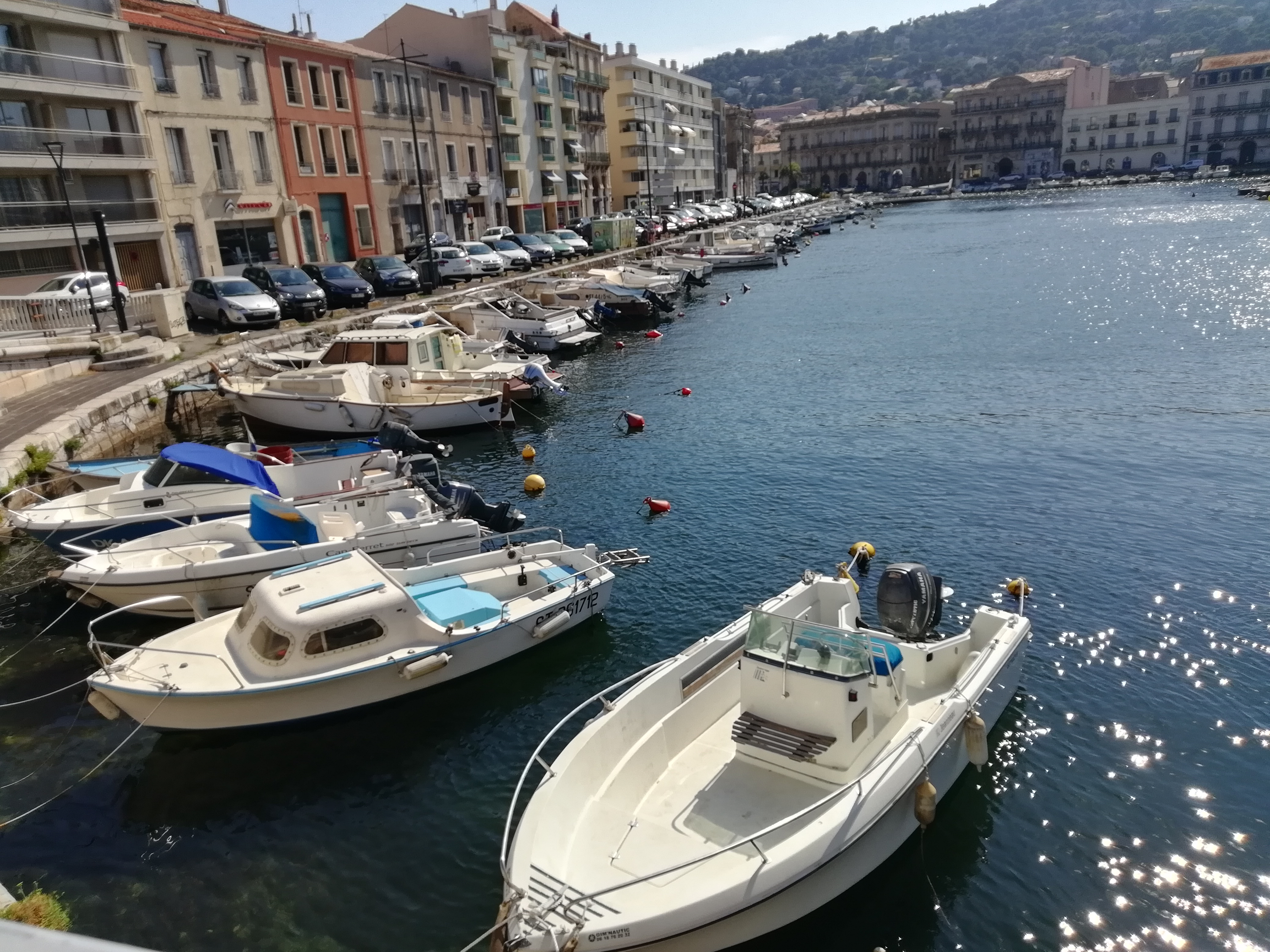

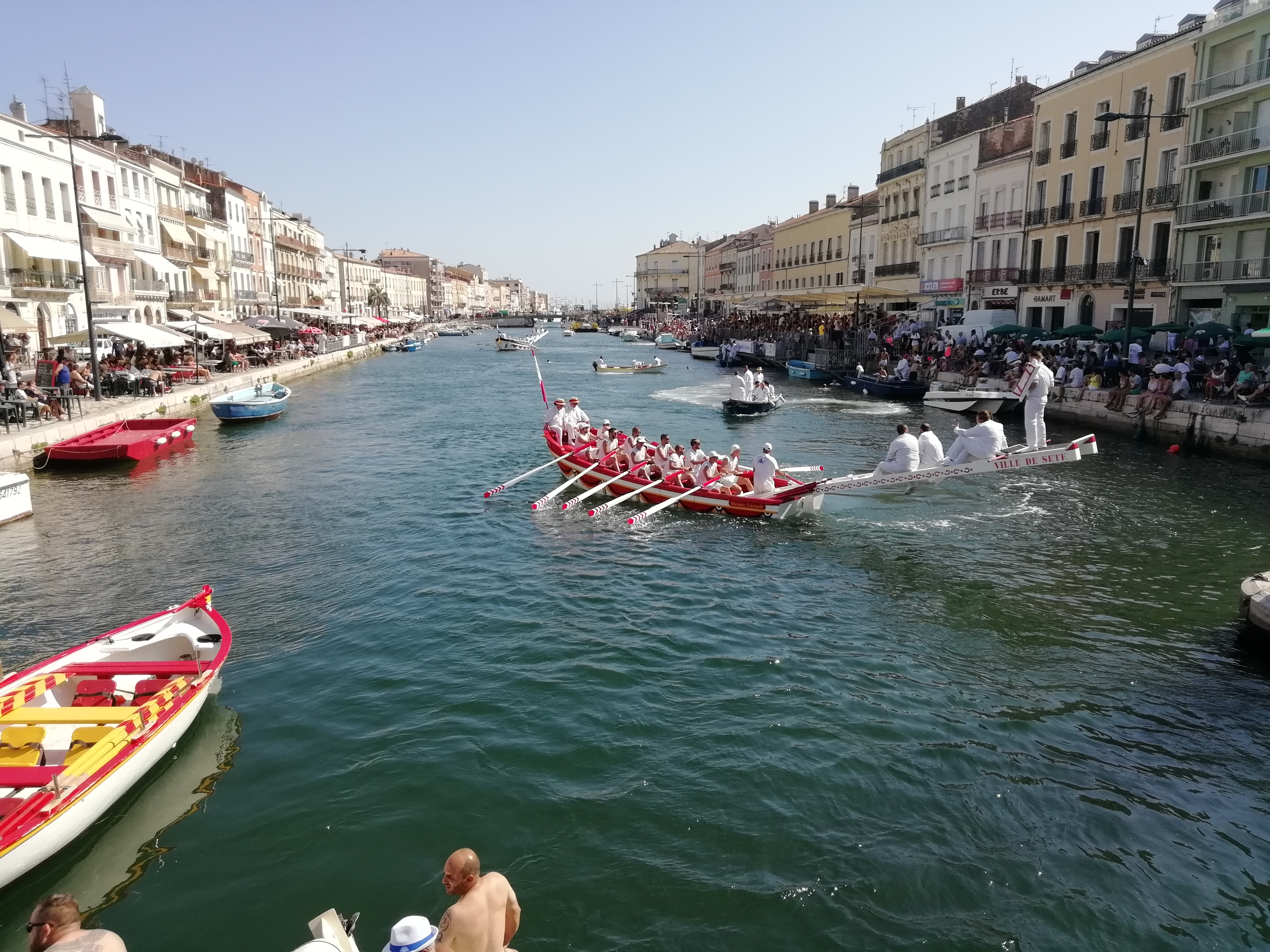

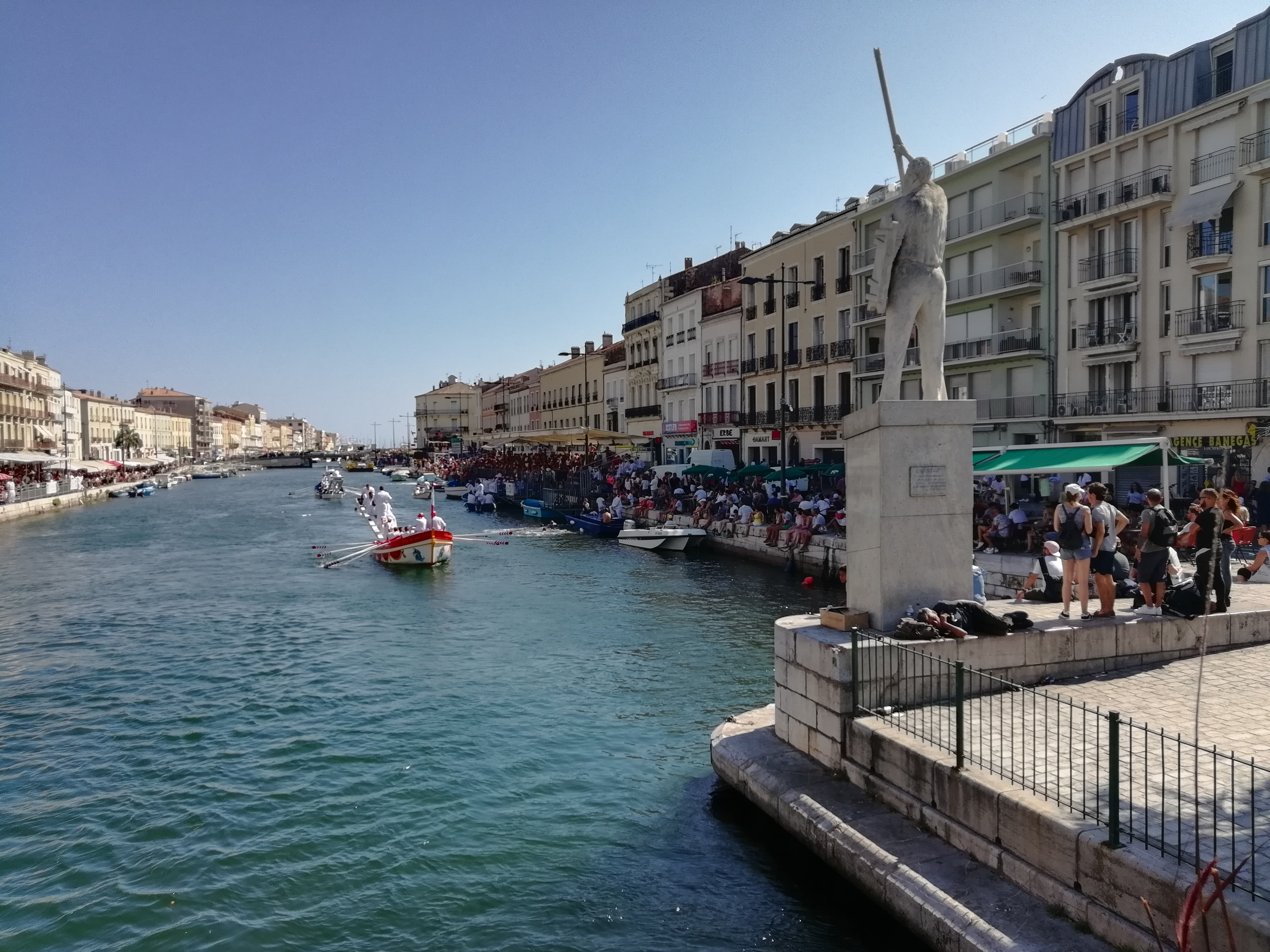

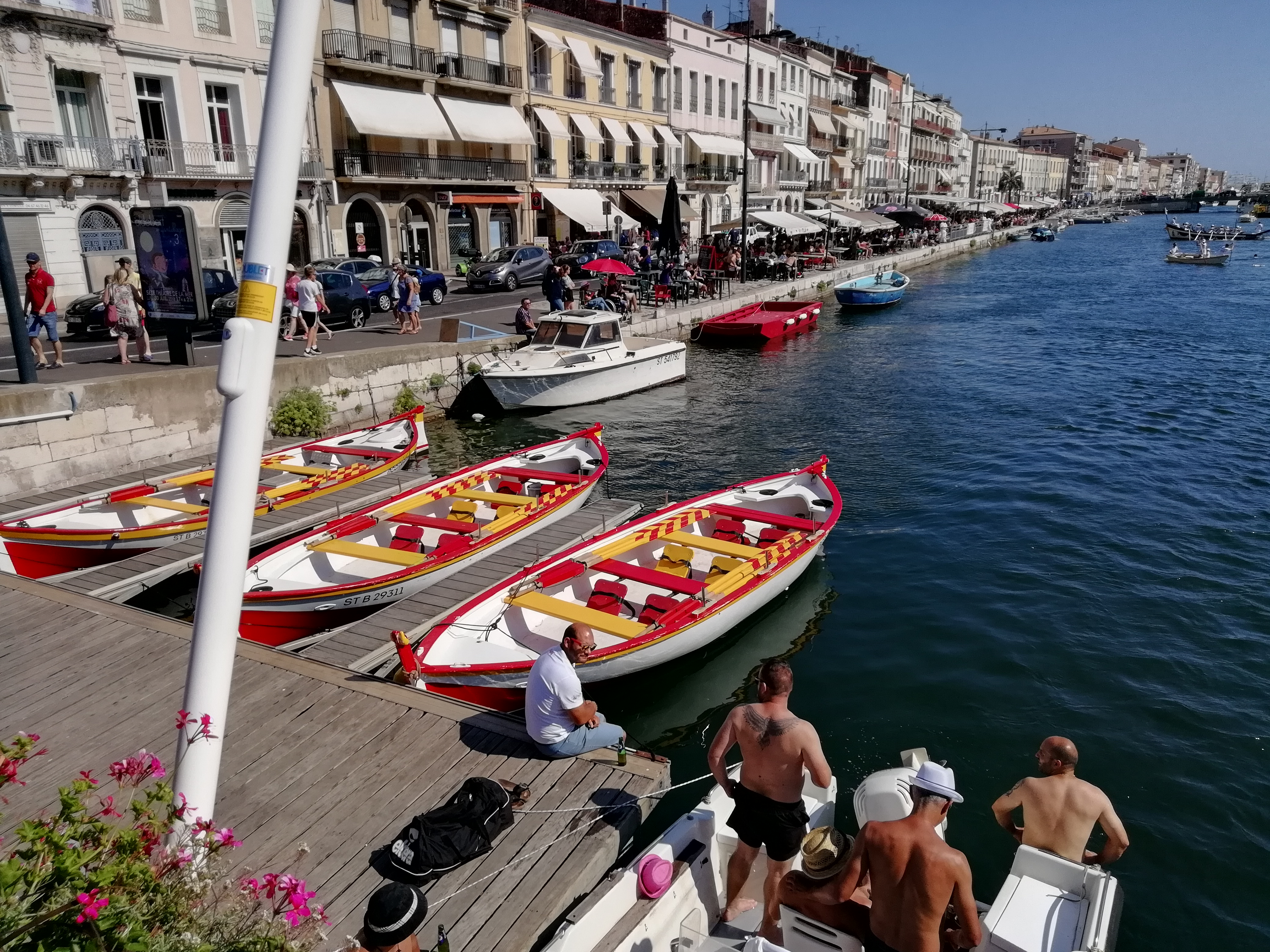

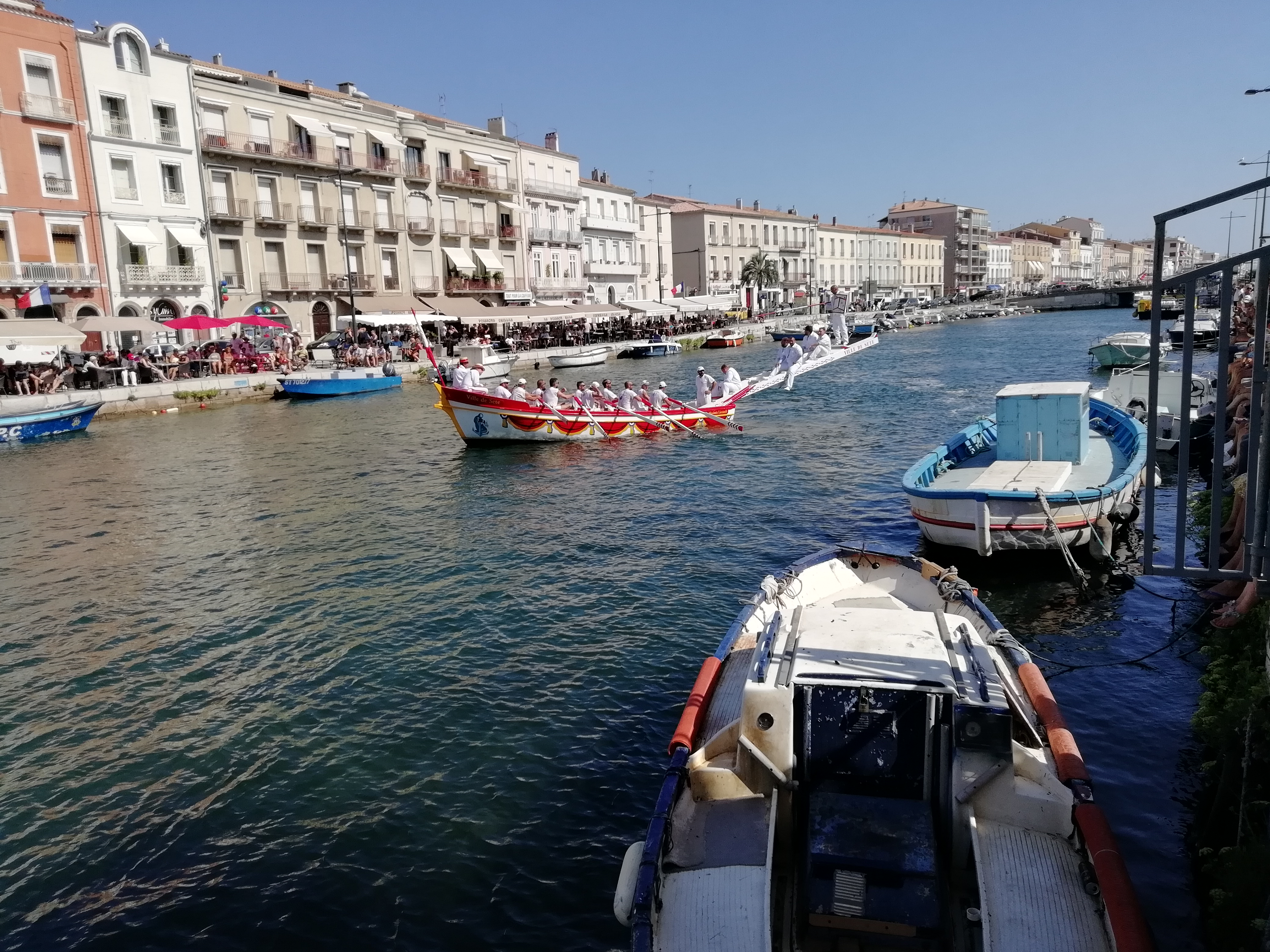

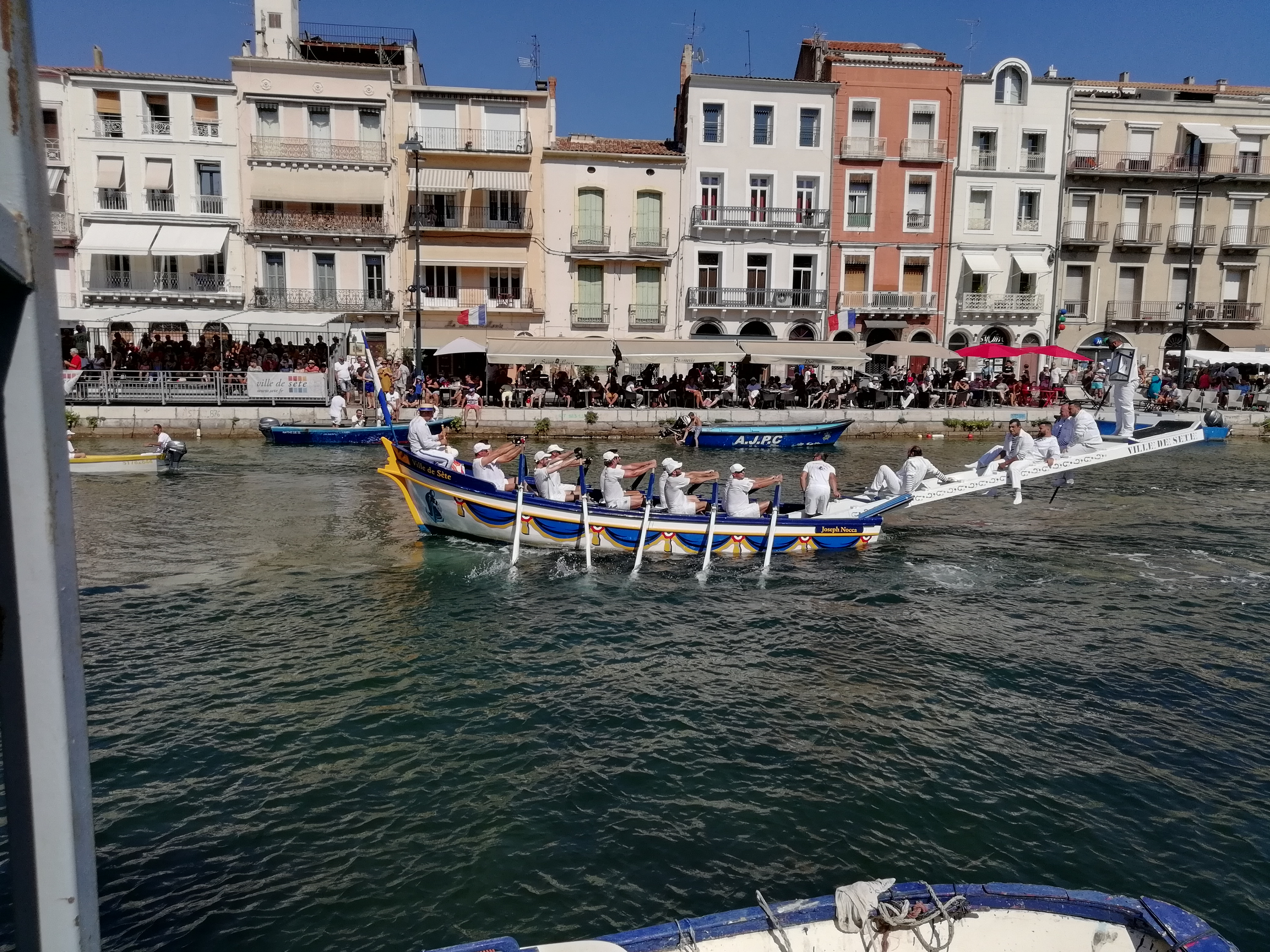

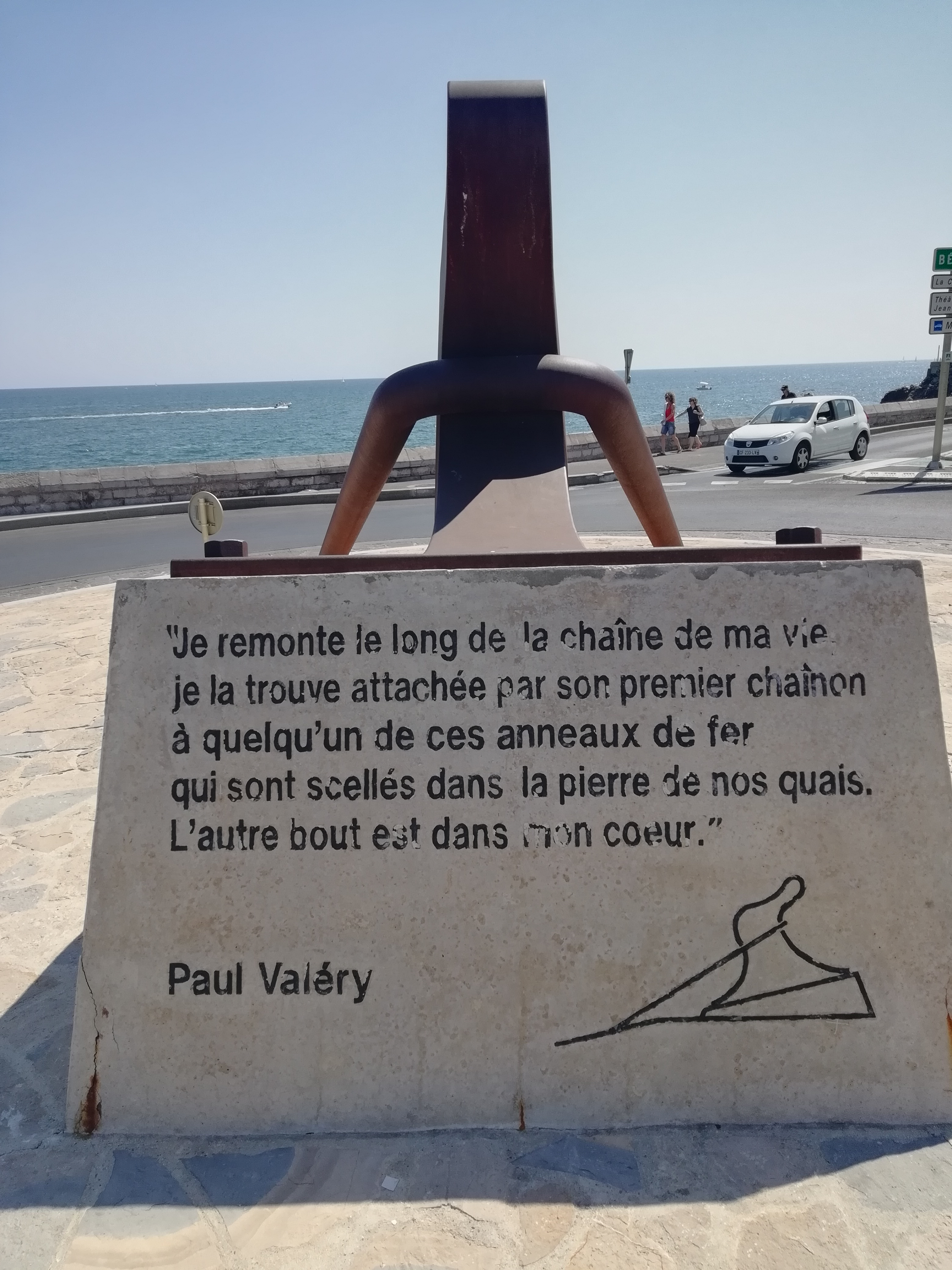

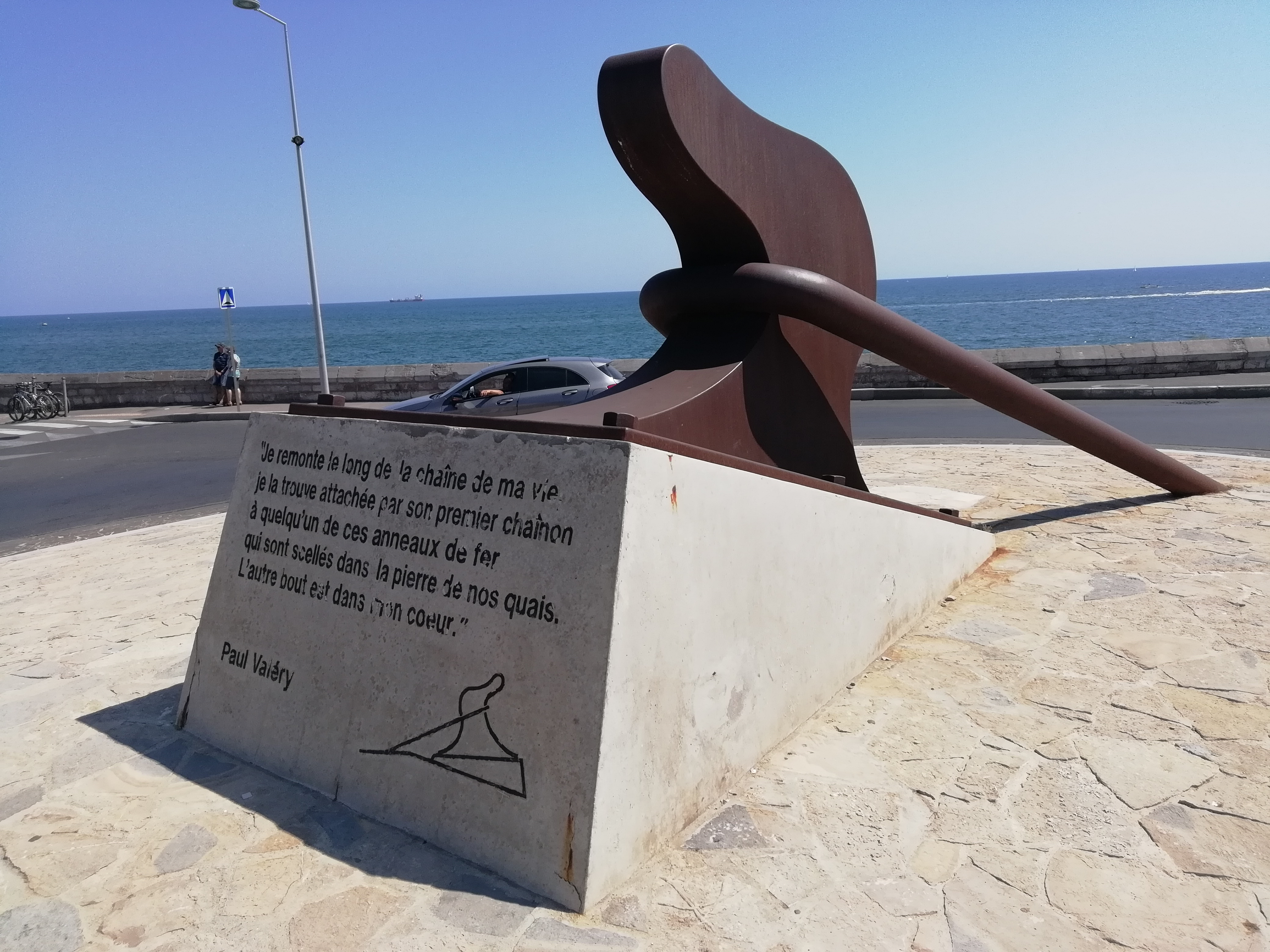

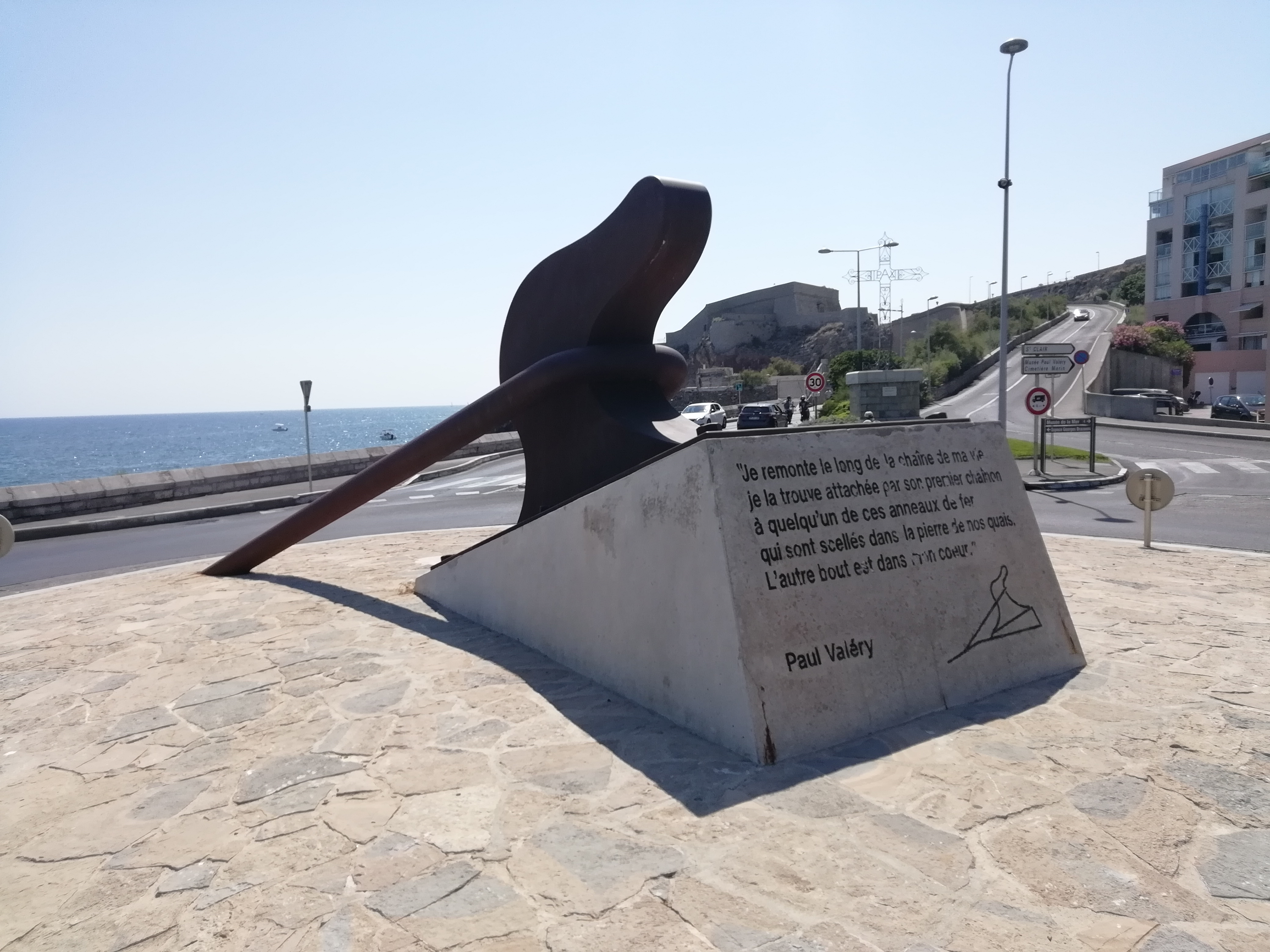

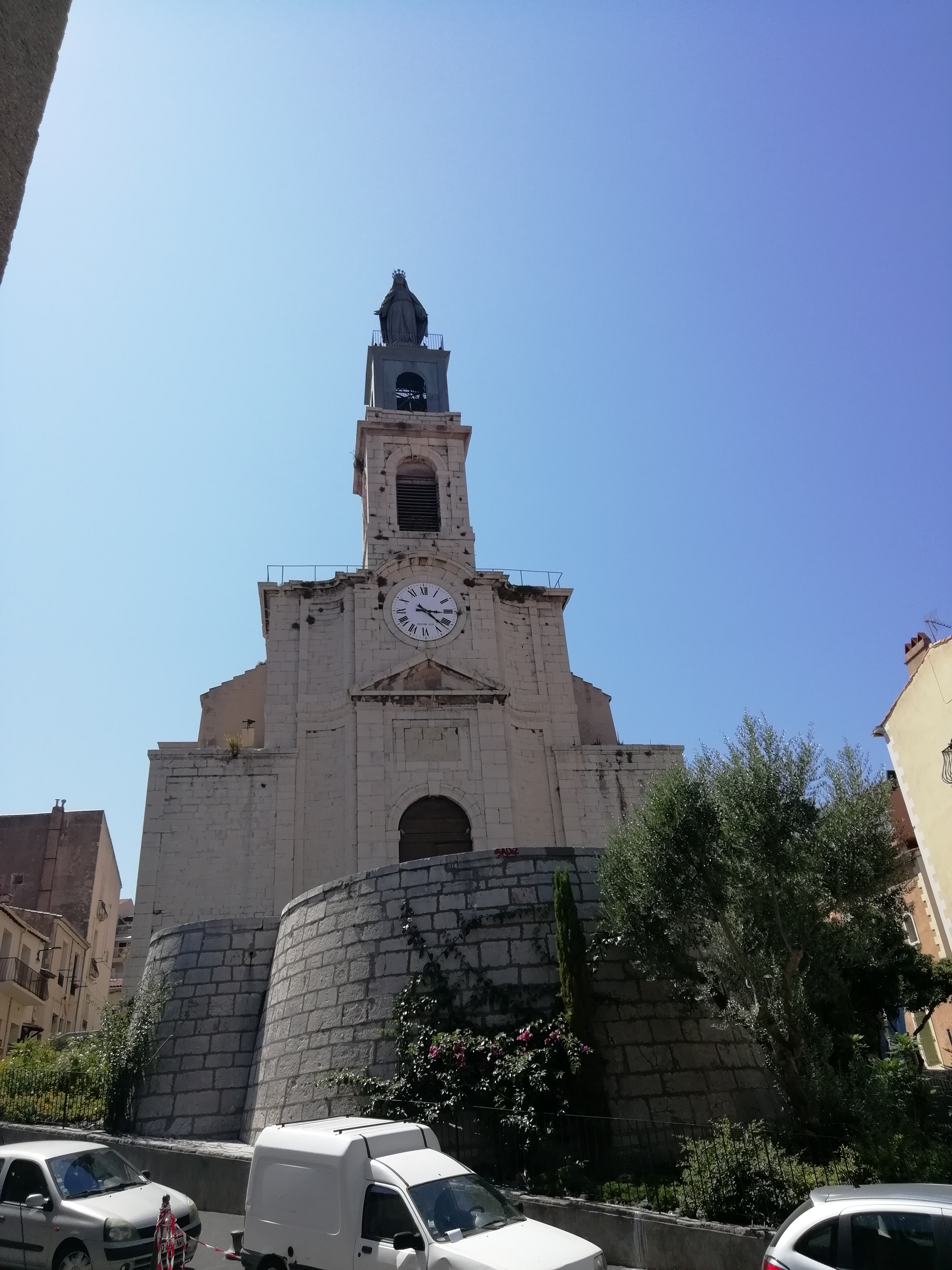

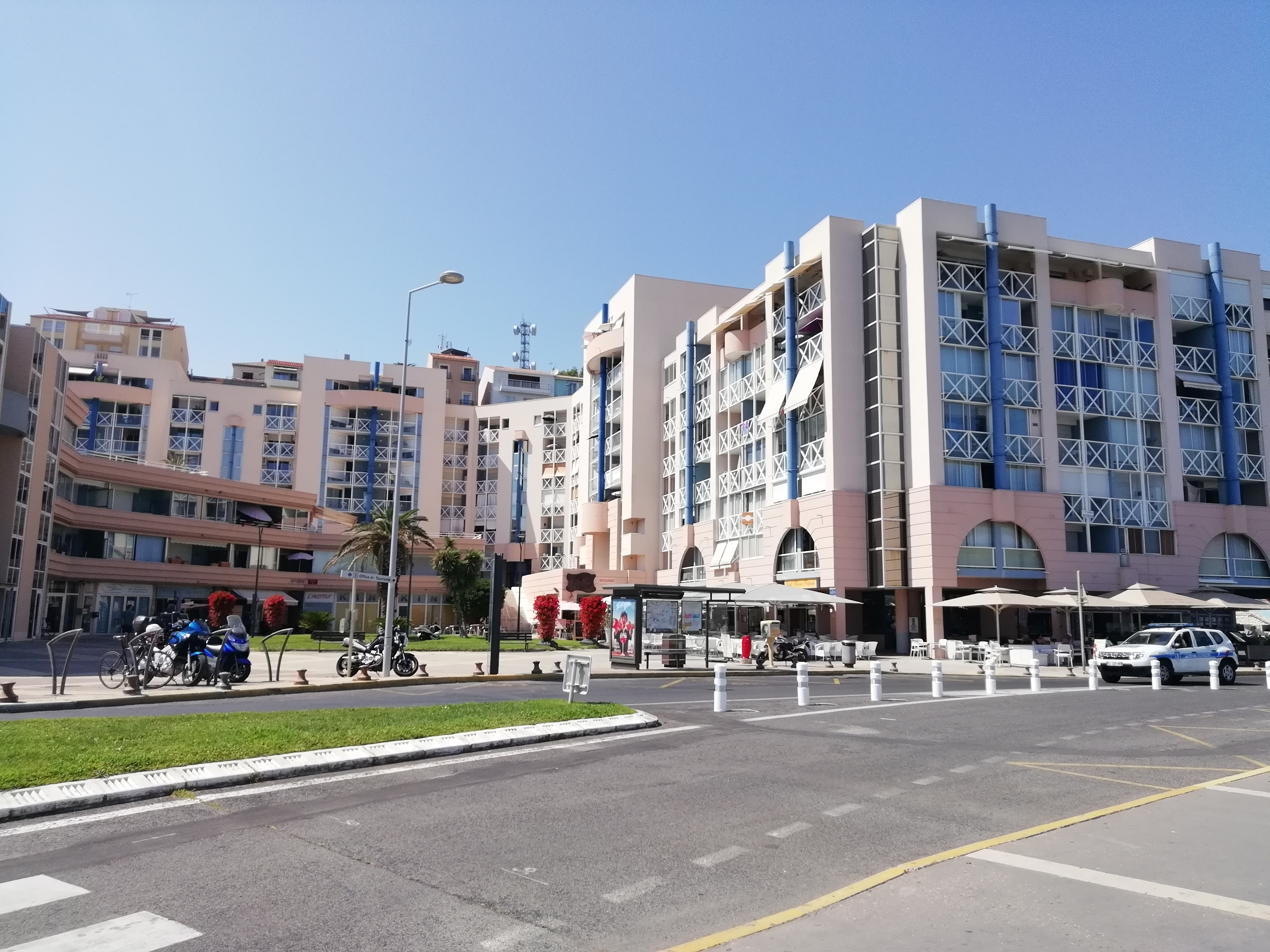

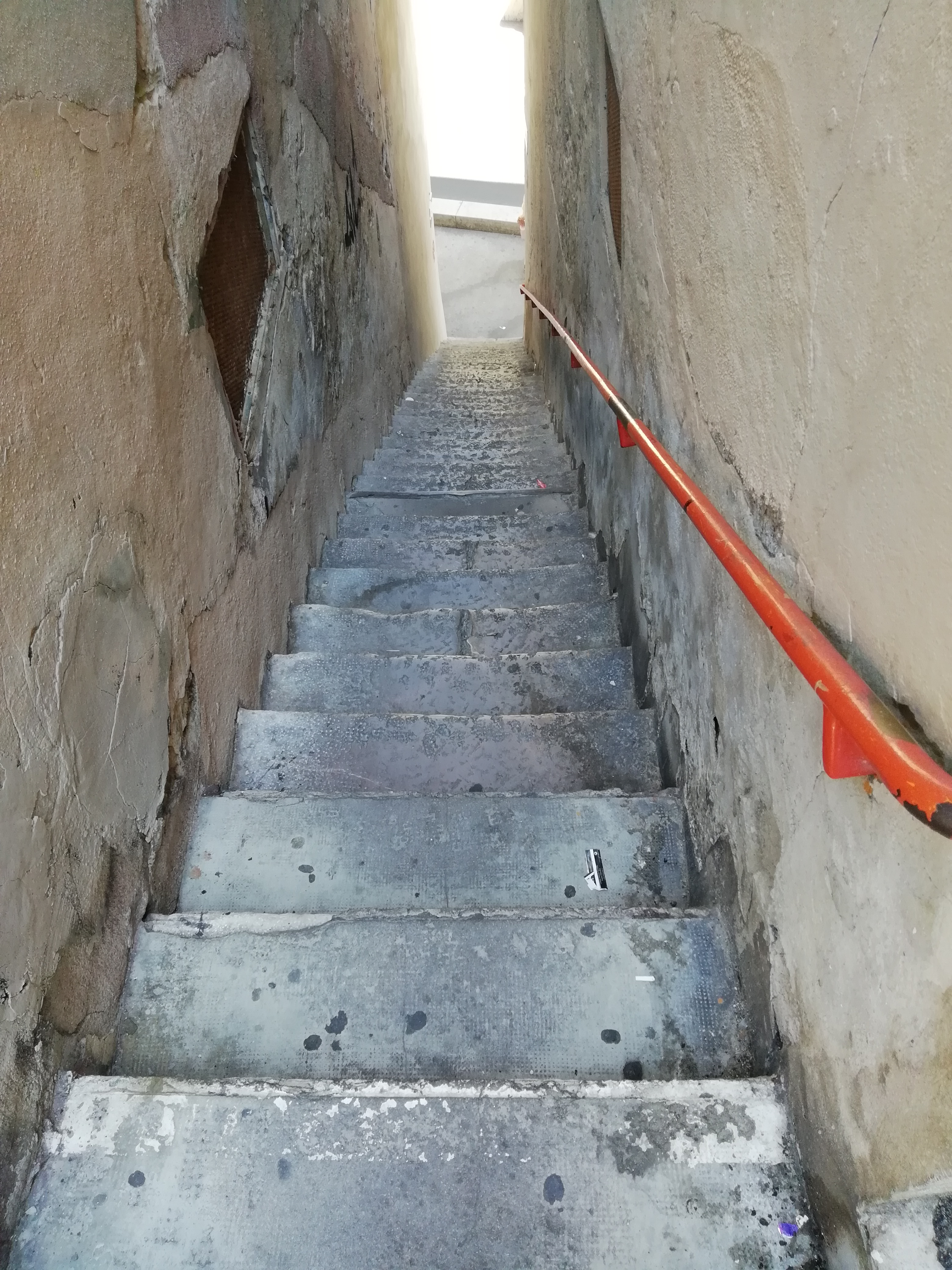

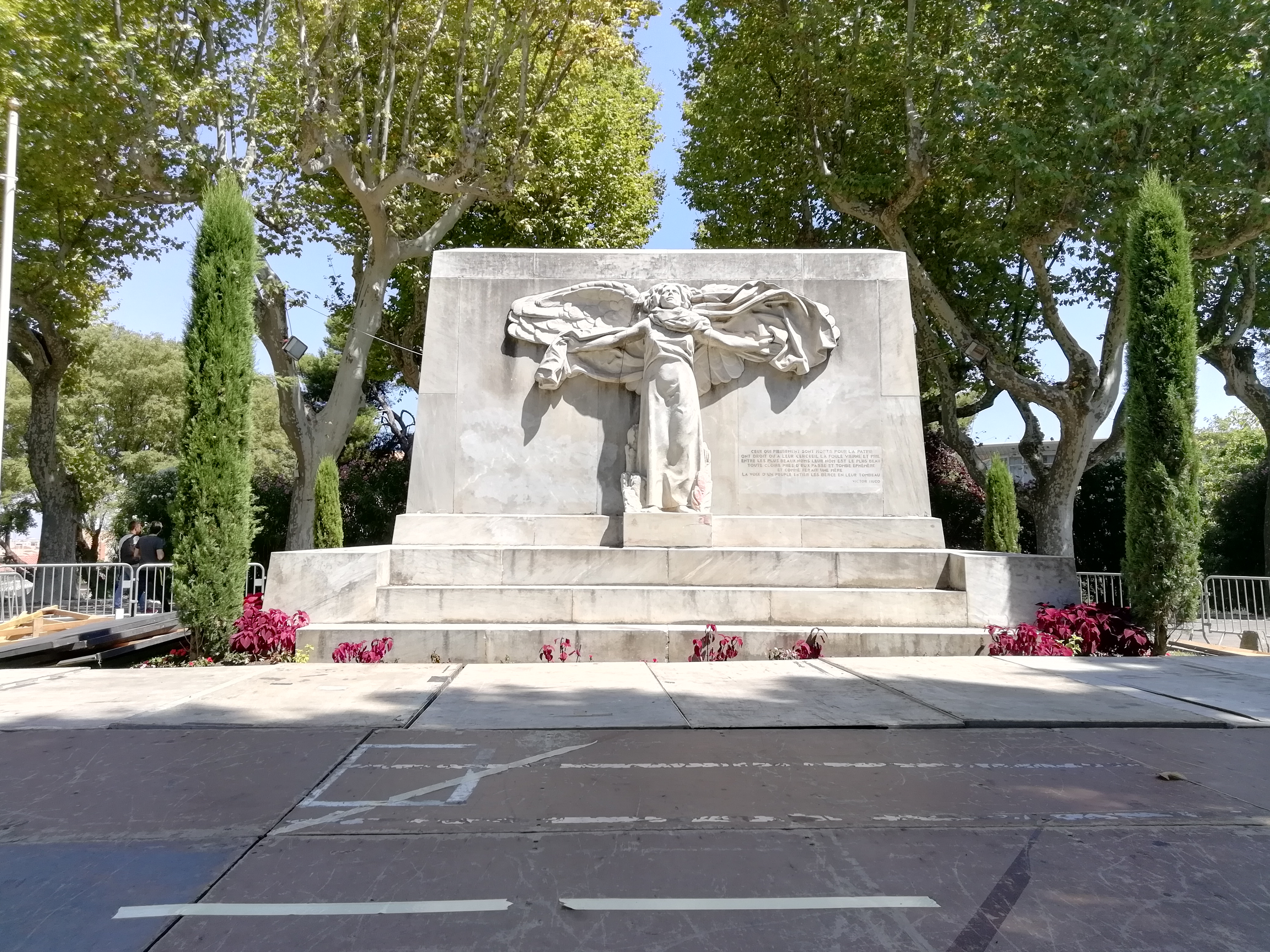

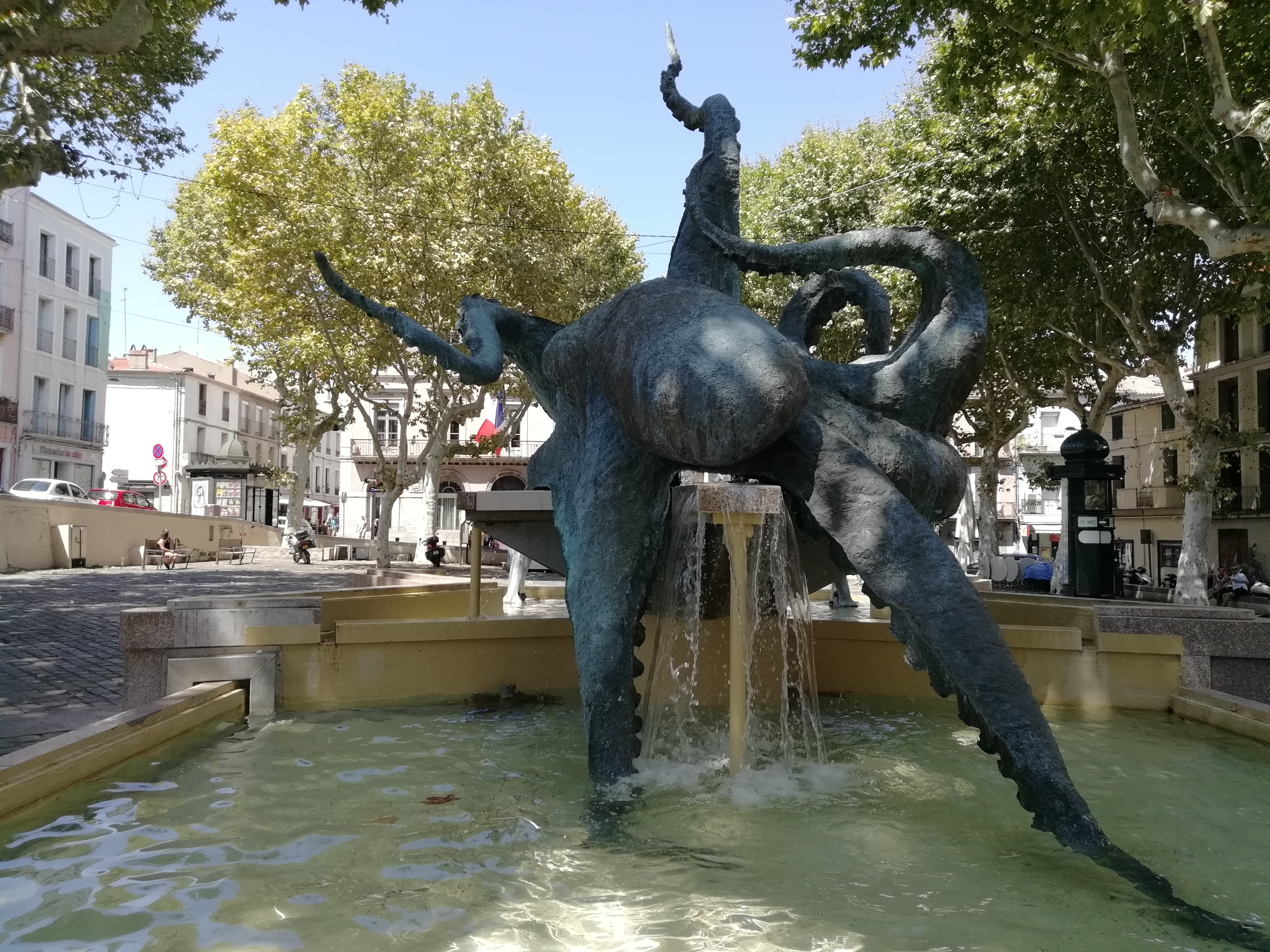

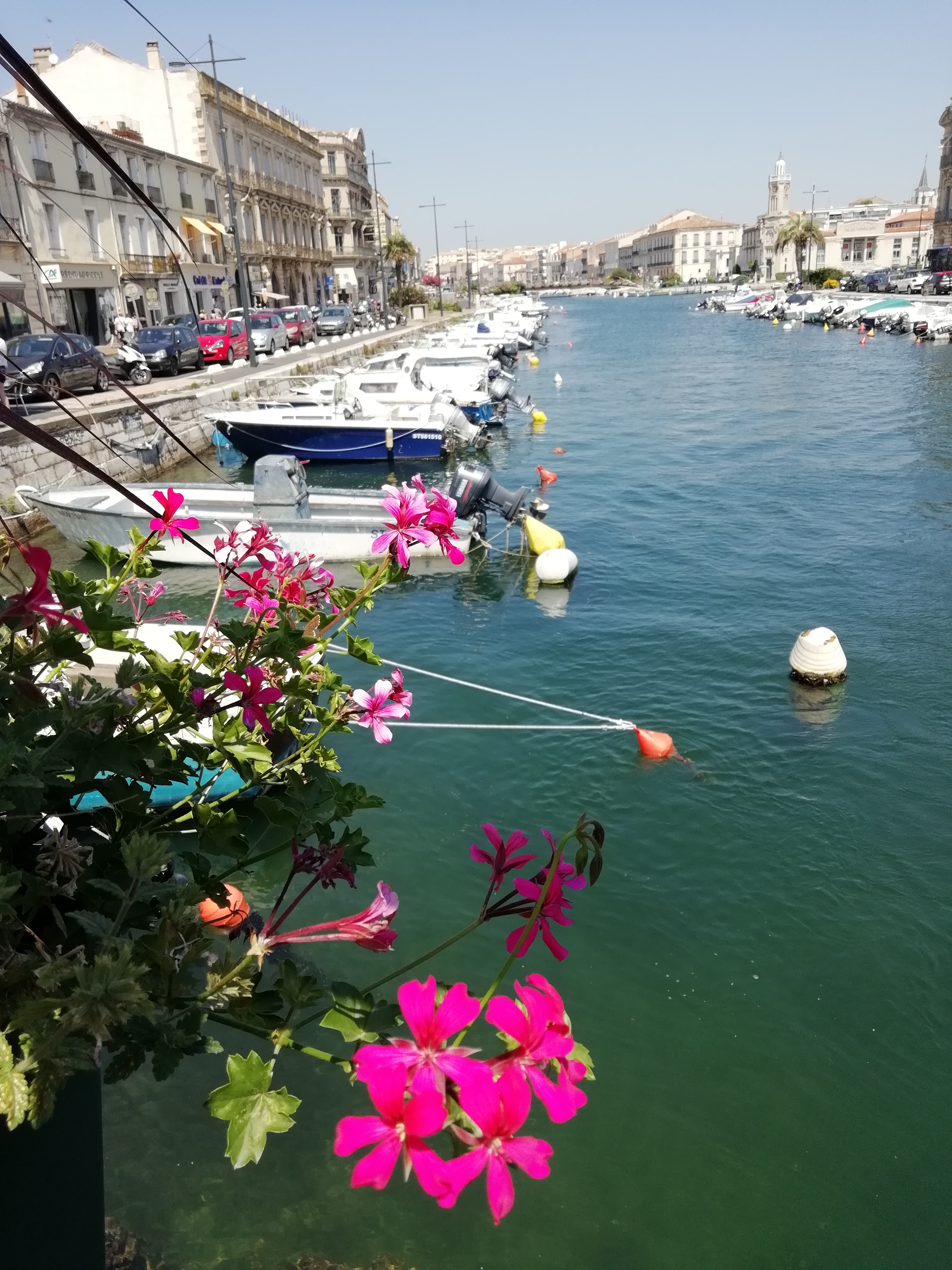

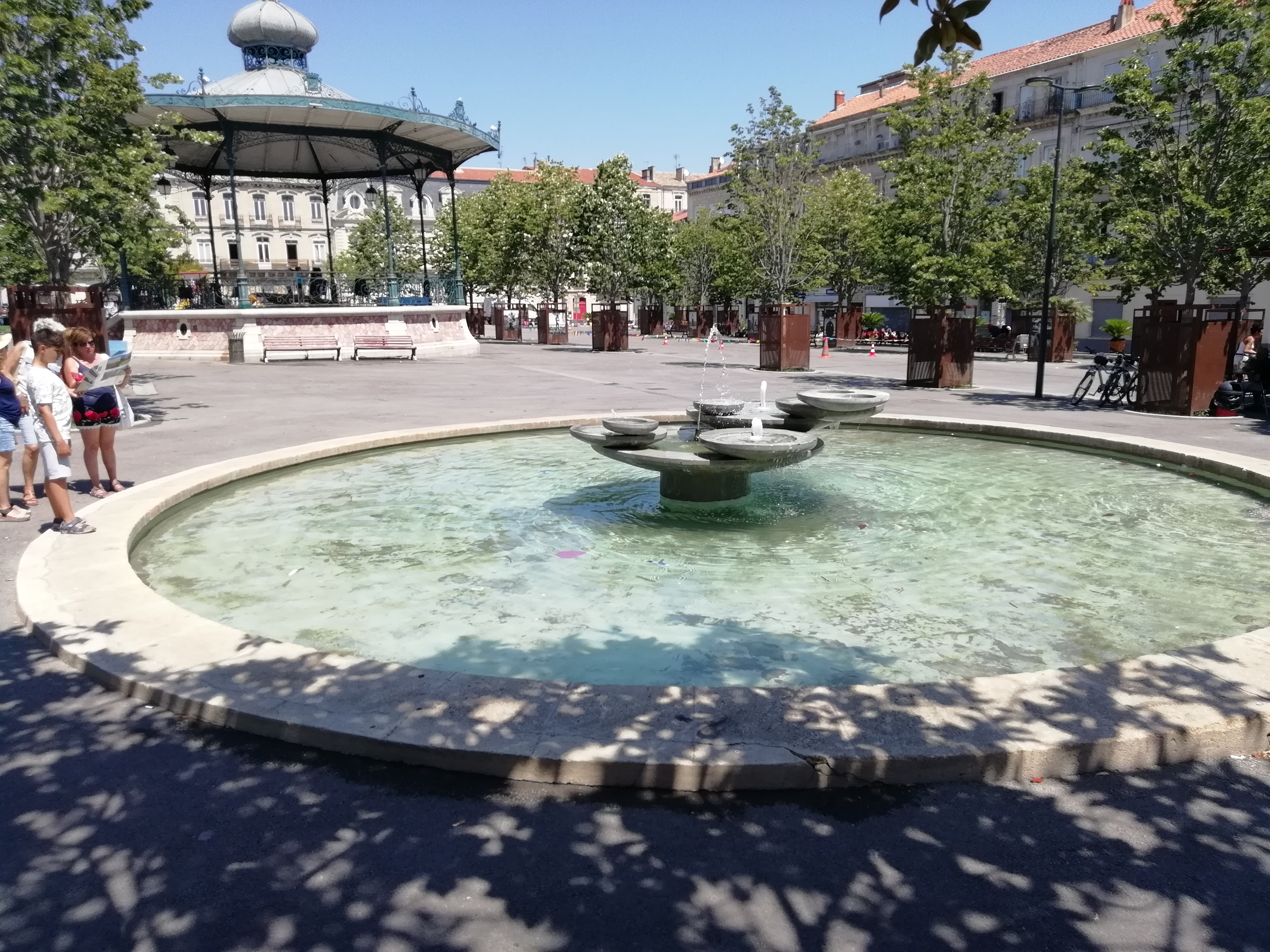

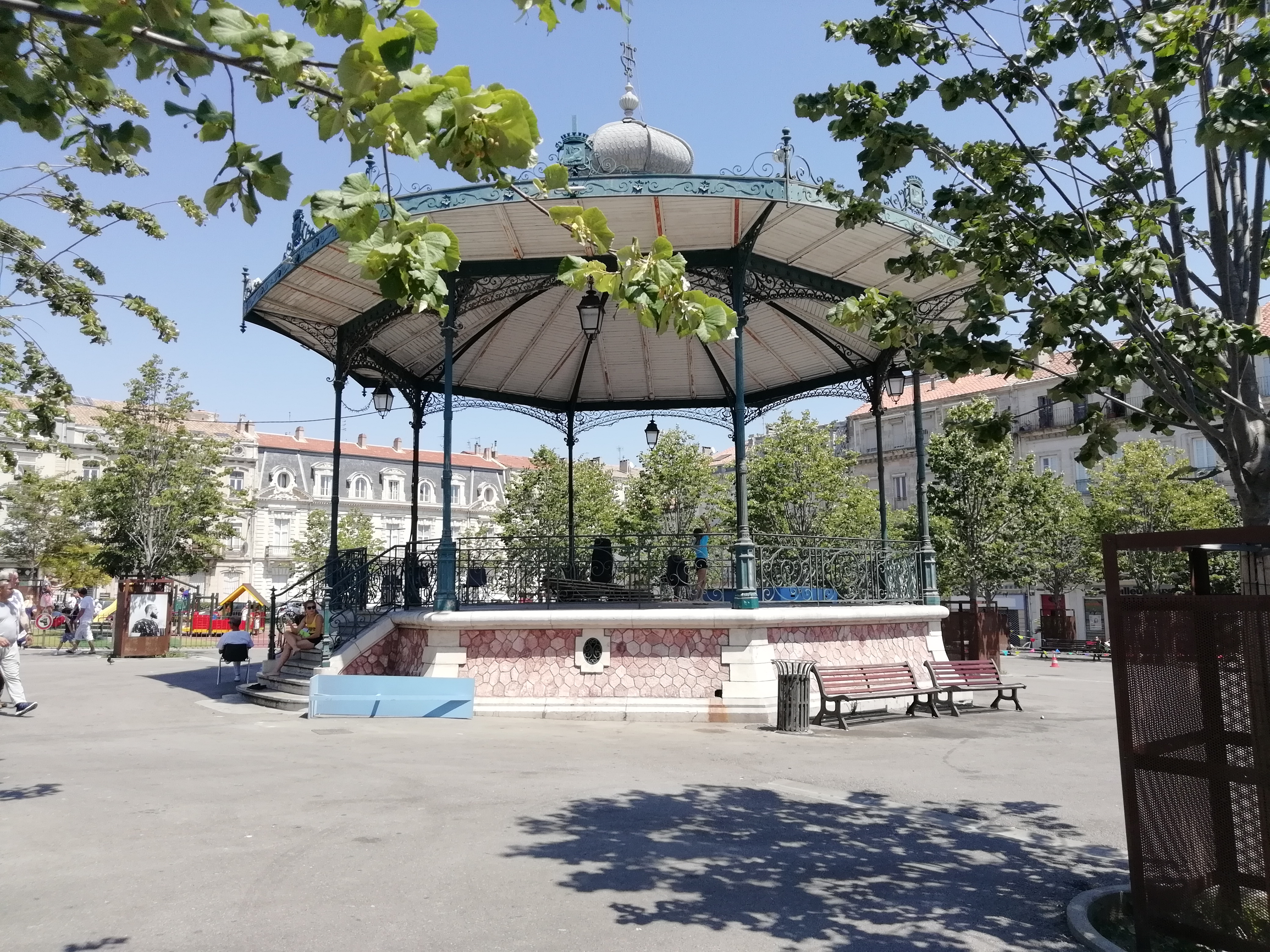

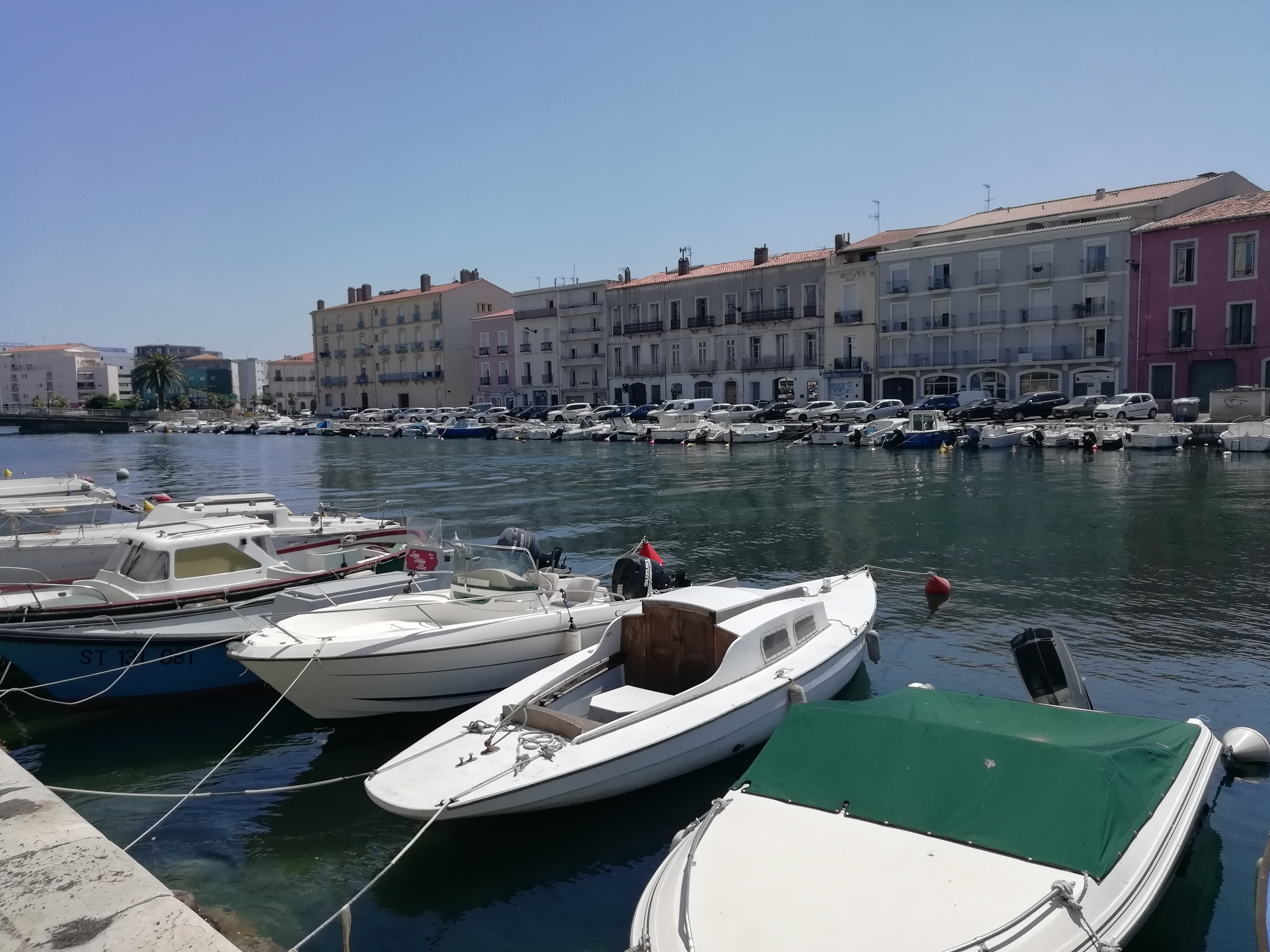

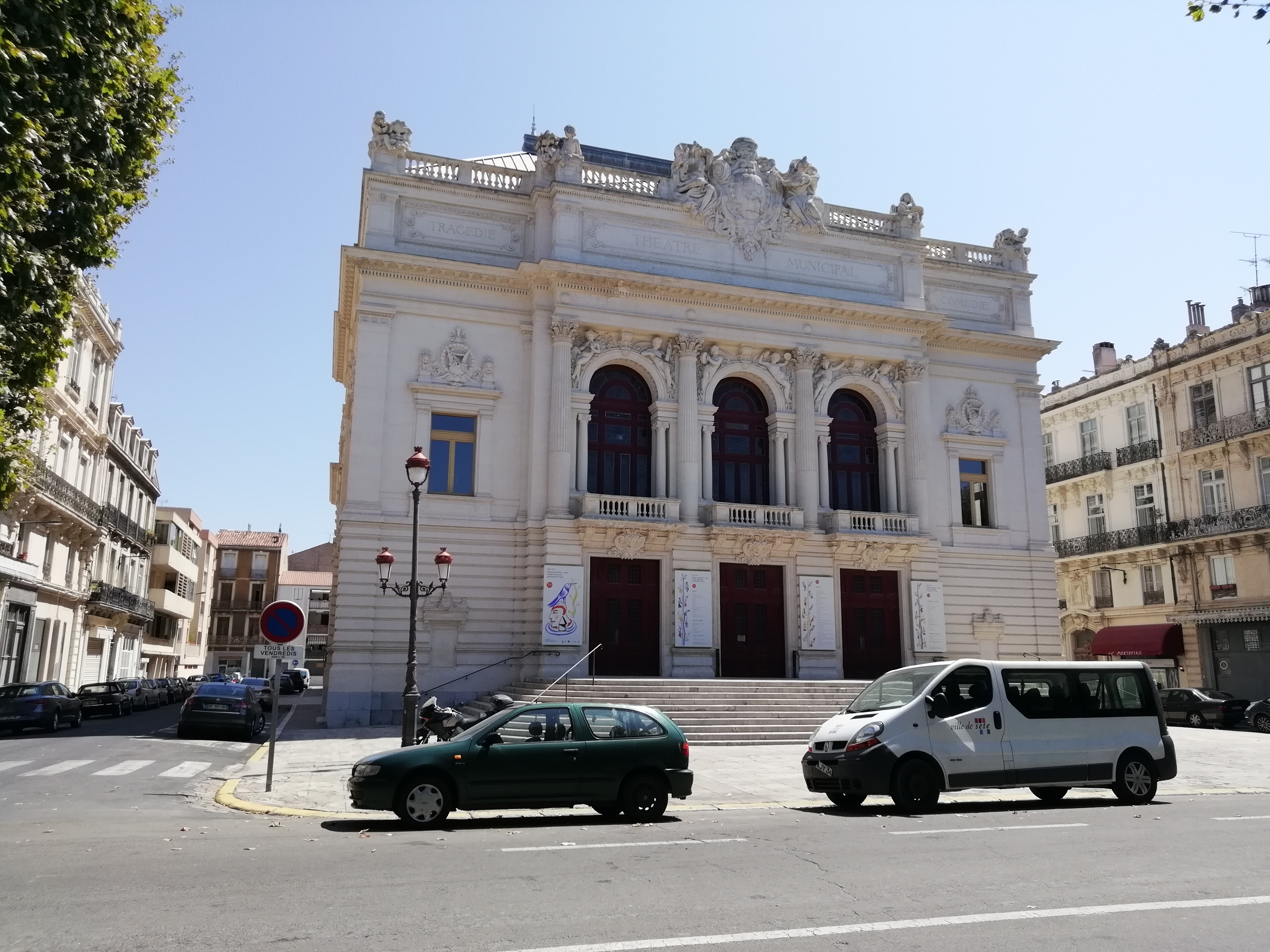

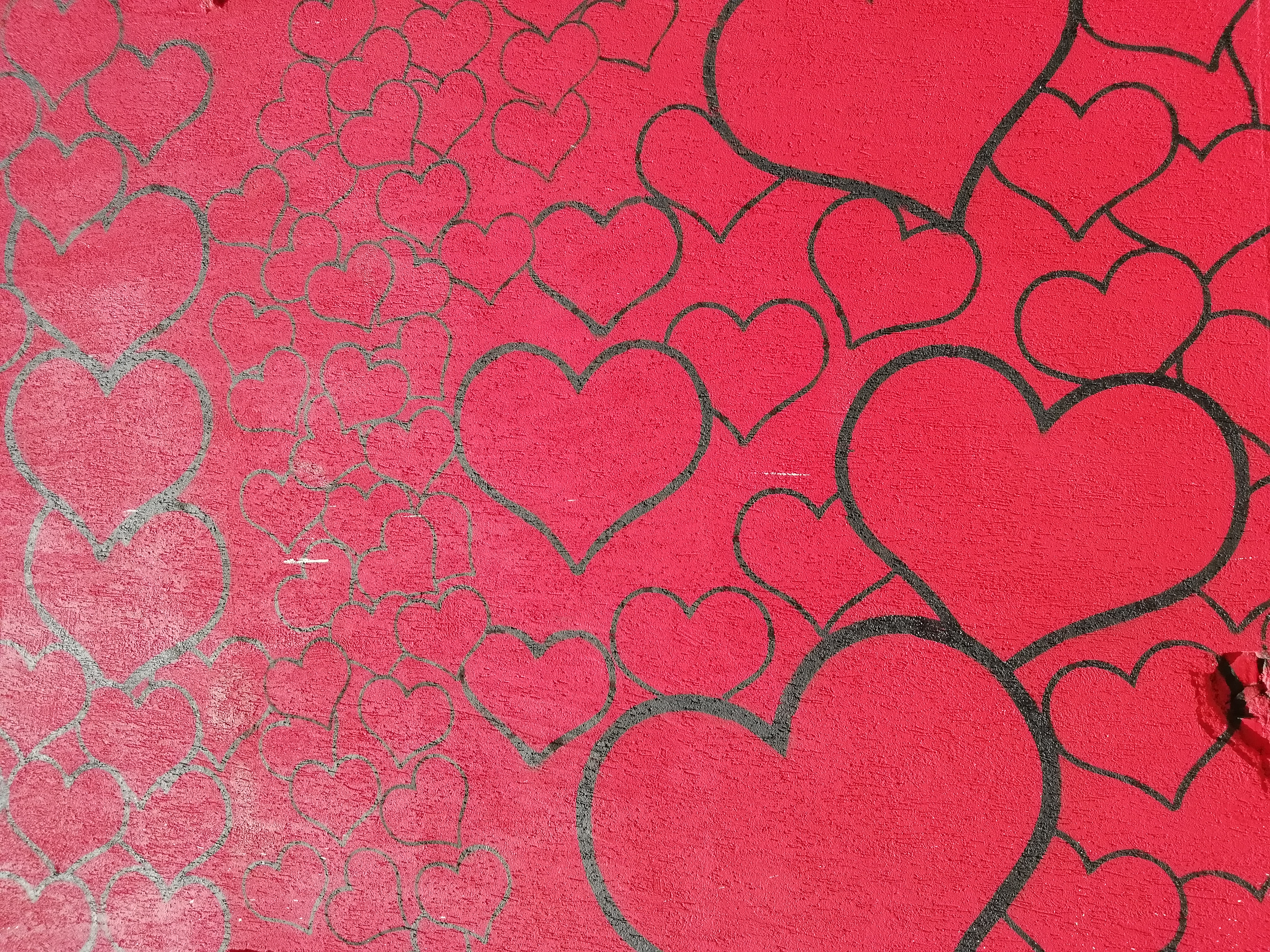

== See also ==
- Communes of the Hérault department
