= Samuel Herschel Schulman =

Exodus 1947's survivor (1928–2019)

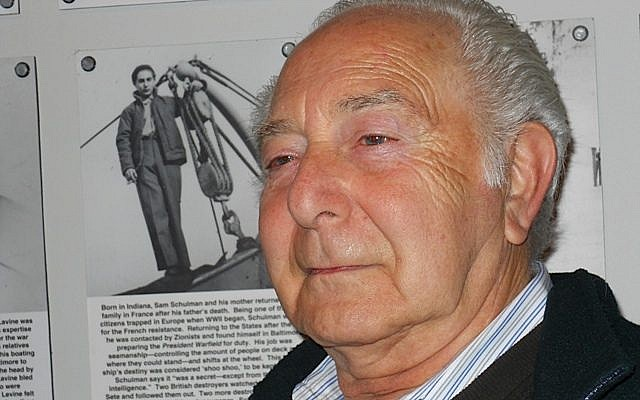
- Sam Schulman at the Virginia Holocaust Museum, Richmond, in 2003
- Born: July 8, 1928; Terre Haute, Indiana, U.S.
- Died: July 5, 2019 (aged 90); Richmond, Virginia, U.S.
- Other name: Sam Schulman
- Occupations: Seaman, Watchmaker/Jeweler
- Known for: Crew member on the Aliyah Bet ship Exodus 1947; early founder of Kibbutz Mishmar HaNegev; veteran of the 1948 Arab–Israeli War

Samuel Herschel Schulman (July 8, 1928 – July 5, 2019) was the last surviving American crew member of the ship Exodus 1947, which tried to bring thousands of Holocaust survivors from Europe to Mandatory Palestine. Born in Terre Haute, Indiana, to Jewish immigrants from Poland, he moved to Paris in 1932, surviving the Holocaust in hiding in central France.

After the war, he was repatriated to the United States where he joined the Aliyah Bet, the clandestine immigration movement to bring Jews who survived the Holocaust in Europe to Mandatory Palestine, and then fought with Israel in the 1948 Arab–Israeli War.

Schulman returned to the United States in the 1950s and was drafted to the US Army during the Korean War, serving two years training soldiers at Camp Edwards on Cape Cod, Massachusetts. After being released from the army, he went into the jewelry business in New York City.

== Early life ==
=== Indiana ===
Samuel Schulman was born in Terre Haute, Indiana, on July 8, 1928.

His parents Hillel and Sarah Schulman (née Sobkowska) immigrated to the United States from Warsaw, Poland, in the 1920s. After his father died of appendicitis in 1932, he moved to Poland with his mother to be with her family.

Sarah Schulman remarried to an Orthodox rabbi, Moses Maidenbaum, and moved to Paris, France, in 1933.

=== France ===
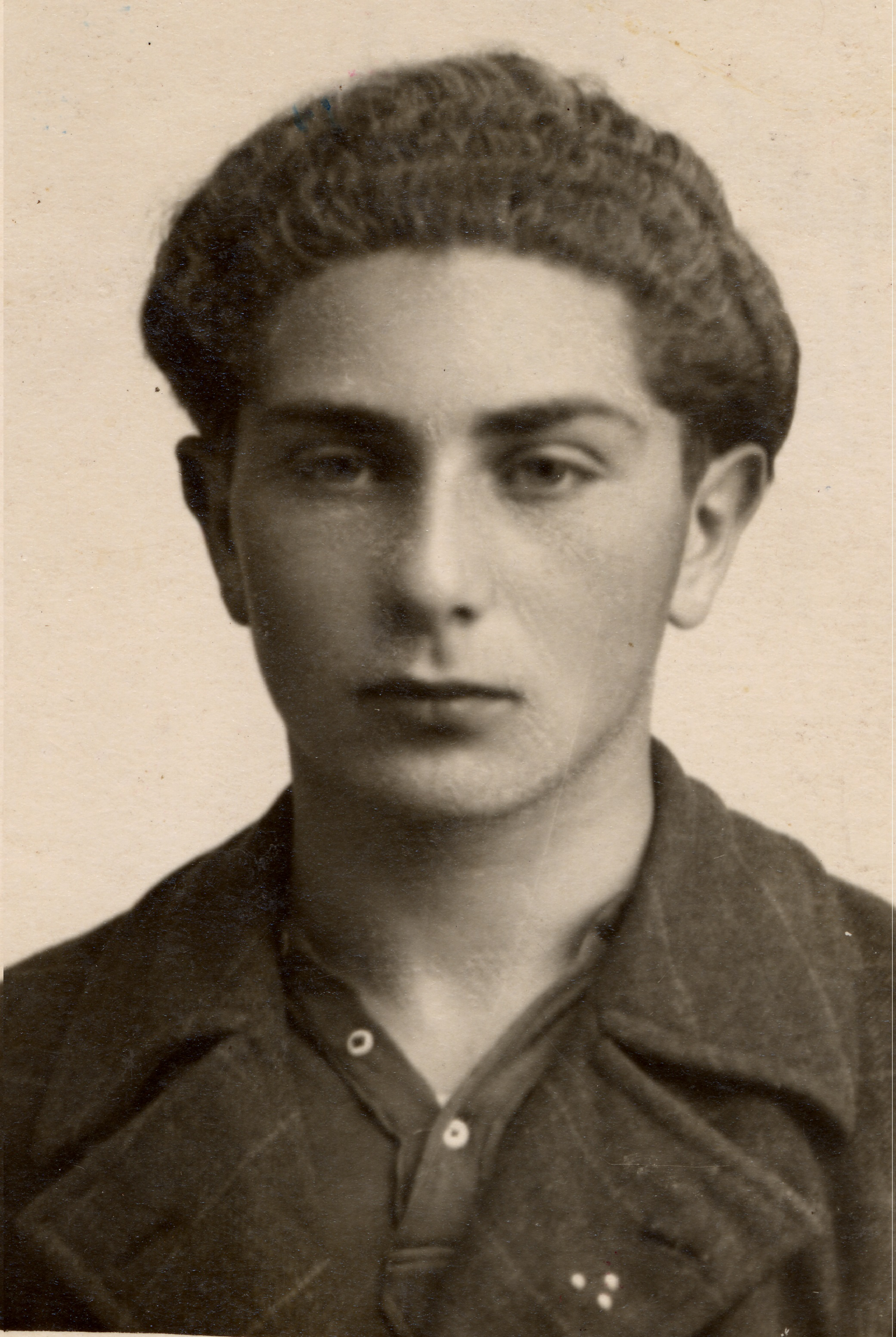
Sam Schulman in Pionnat, France, 1944 (Courtesy: Schulman Family)

In May 1940, Germany invaded France and occupied Paris the following month. Sarah Schulman and her son had to register as Jews in order to obtain ration cards; she had to wear a Jewish star, but Sam Schulman, an American citizen, was exempt. Since Sarah Schulman was officially stateless, she could not return to the United States.

In July 1942, after the Gestapo conducted a round-up of Parisian Jews, Sam Schulman and his mother fled Paris. His step-father was on a business trip to the United States when the war broke out and could not return to France.

Schulman and his mother were smuggled on a freight train to Limoges, in the unoccupied zone, from where they continued to La Creuse. They remained in hiding in the small town of Pionnat, France, from 1942 to 1945. While Schulman and his mother survived the Holocaust, most of his family in Poland, including his grandmother, aunts and uncles, were murdered in Auschwitz.

In February 1946, Schulman and his mother were repatriated to United States through the Hebrew Immigrant Aid Society (HIAS).

== Exodus 1947 and Aliyah Bet ==
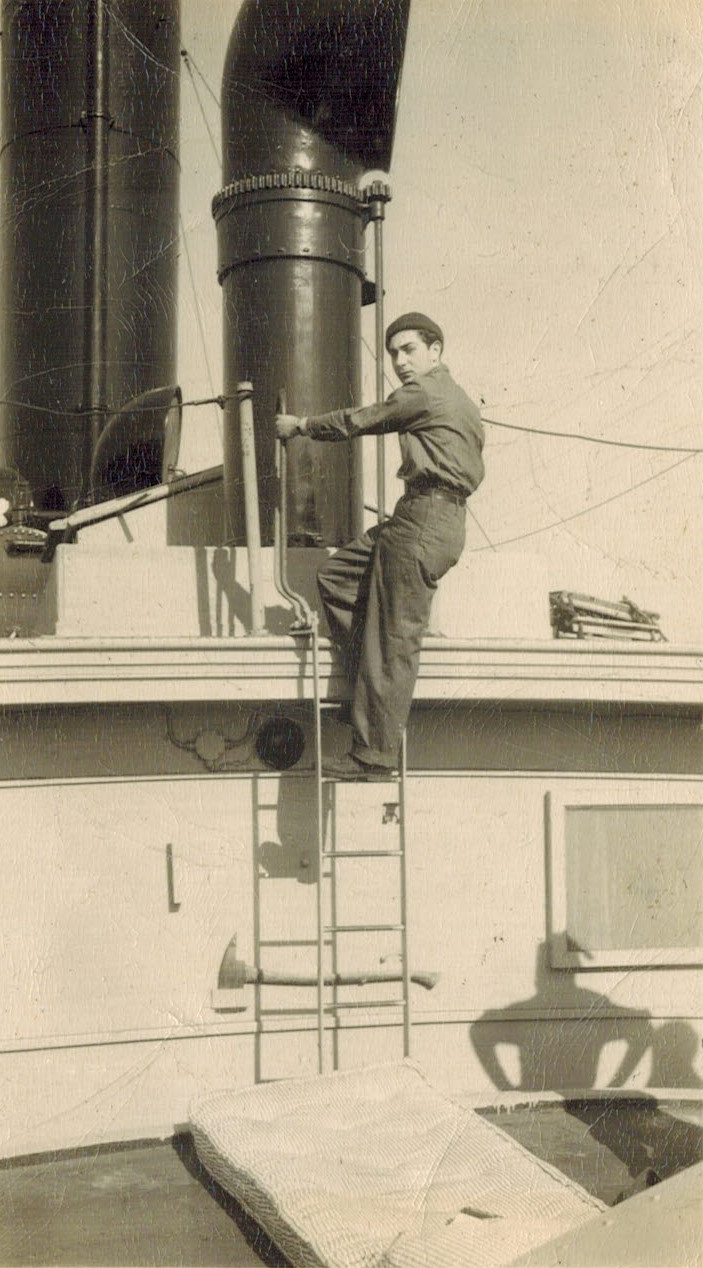
Sam Schulman aboard Exodus 1947

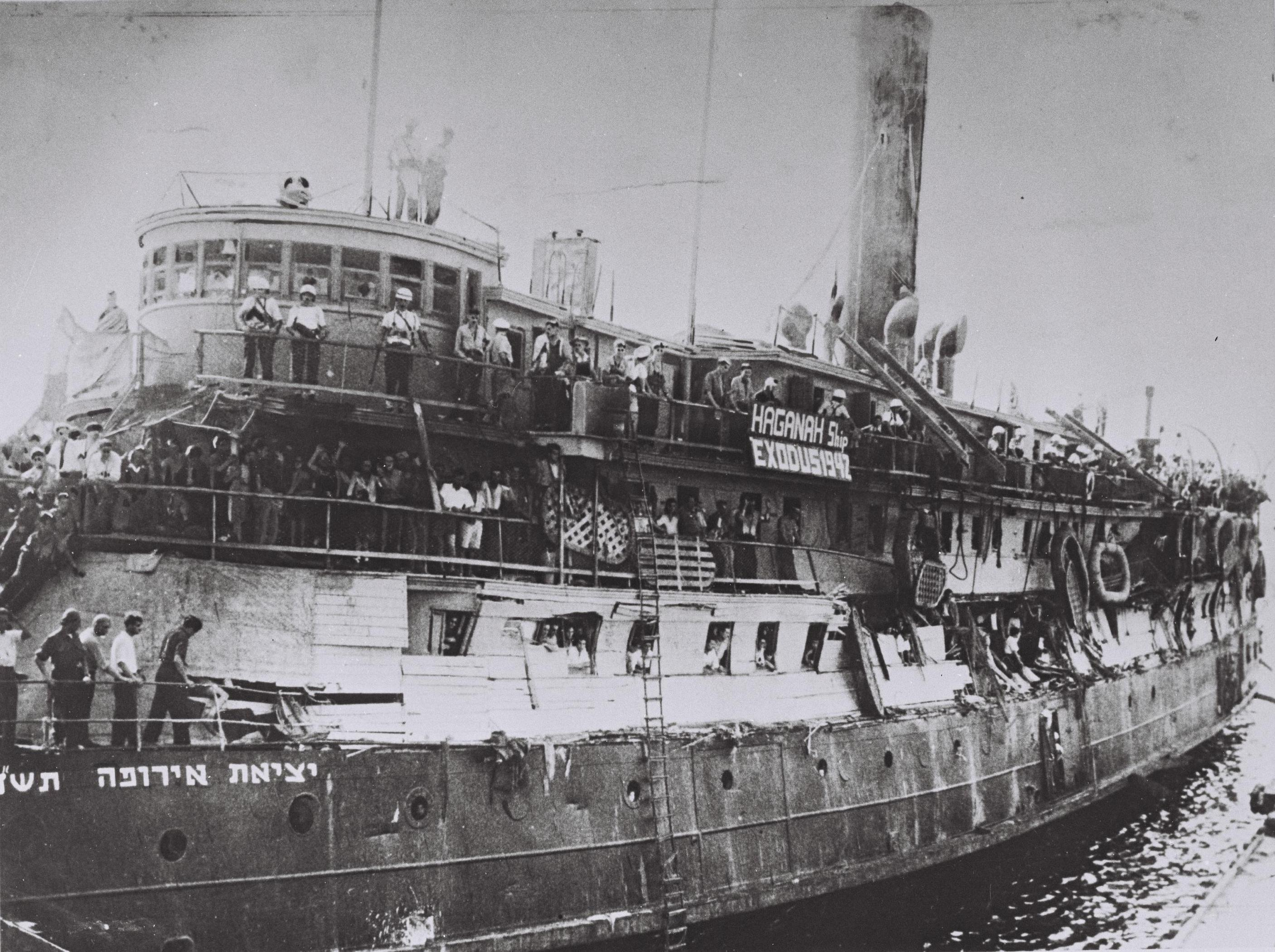
Exodus 1947 in the Port of Haifa after her capture

In March 1947, Schulman was instructed by a contact in the Haganah in New York to go to Baltimore, Maryland, where he thought he would board a ship as a passenger to British-mandate Palestine. When he got to the Baltimore Harbor on March 23, 1947, he learned that he was to become part of the Mossad LeAliyah Bet and serve as a crew member aboard the Aliyah Bet ship Exodus 1947.

Exodus 1947 left Sète, France, on July 11, 1947, carrying 4,515 Jewish refugees. Ike Aronowicz was the ship's captain and the Haganah commander of the operation was Yossi Harel. The ship was manned by a crew of some 35 volunteers, mostly American Jews, including Samuel Schulman.

Schulman also sailed on two other Aliyah Bet ships, the Pan Crescent and Pan York, which left from the port of Burgas, Bulgaria, on December 27, 1947, with over 15,000 immigrants. Several days later they were stopped by British warships and forced to anchor at Famagusta, Cyprus.

About his experience on the ships, Schulman once said:

“The Exodus might have been the most famous of all the Aliya Bet ships, but the Pan ships brought the largest number of refugees from Europe at one time.”

Schulman spent six weeks in a British internment camp on Cyprus before being smuggled out by the Haganah in January 1948 on the Jewish passenger liner the Kedmah under the alias of one of the immigrants approved by the monthly British quota to Mandatory Palestine.

Exodus 1947 was popularized in Leon Uris' 1958 bestselling novel Exodus, and later made into a Hollywood film based on the book starring Paul Newman.

== Israel ==
Arriving in the port of Haifa in January 1948, Schulman headed south to help settle Kibbutz Mishmar HaNegev with friends he knew from his youth movement days in France.

He would then fight with Israel in the 1948 Arab–Israeli War, training seamen in navigation at a naval base in Haifa.

In June 1987, Schulman and other Aliya Bet volunteers were honored by Israeli President Chaim Herzog for their contributions to the State of Israel. At this first reunion of the American volunteers in Jerusalem, Herzog said:

"Out of six million American Jews, it was you who jumped into the breach."

In a letter to mark the occasion, then-Minister of Defense, Yitzhak Rabin, wrote:

"Your participation in the struggle of the Jewish People to bring the Holocaust survivors to Eretz Israel will be inscribed in the history of the People of Israel as a bright chapter of volunteering spirit and as a meaningful contribution to the establishment of Israel."

In November 2018, Schulman received a medal and certificate from Israeli Minister of Jerusalem and Heritage Affairs, Ze'ev Elkin, for his contribution to bringing Jewish immigrants to Mandatory Palestine.

== United States ==
Shortly after his return to the United States from Israel in 1949, Schulman was drafted to the Korean War. He spent two years training soldiers at Camp Edwards on Cape Cod, Massachusetts, rising to the rank of Sergeant First Class.

After the war, Schulman studied at Brooklyn College and then at the Joseph Bulova School of Watchmaking in Queens, NY, on the GI Bill. He went on to set up a watchmaking business in the diamond exchange district on Canal Street and the Bowery in lower Manhattan where he worked for 40 years.

== Personal life ==
Sam Schulman married Eileen Azif of Mt. Vernon, New York in 1964 and had two sons. His daughter-in-law is Noa Furman, Deputy Permanent Representative of Israel to the United Nations.

A long-time resident of Larchmont, New York, Sam Schulman moved to Richmond, Virginia in 2014. He died a few days before his 91st birthday.

== See also ==
- SS Exodus
- Aliyah Bet
- Yossi Harel
- Ike Aronowicz
- Underground to Palestine
- John Stanley Grauel
