= Jewish Unity Association =

The Jewish Unity Association (founded 1947) was an Australian organisation that sought to increase cooperation within the various denominations of Jewish religiosity and act as a brake on anti-Semitism, which was gaining ground in the country.

== History ==
The association was formed in 1947 by the Jewish Unity Committee as a way of broadening its appeal to the general Hebrew community, and encourage a deeper appreciation of Jewish culture. Office holders in the new organisation included Maurice Allen LL.B. as president, George Berger and Haim Brezniack (Chaim Brezniak?) as vice-presidents, with Jules Cohen and Nate Zusman as secretaries.

The first action of the group was to protest the return to occupied Germany of over 4,500 Jewish refugees, passengers on SS Exodus 1947, who intended resettlement in Palestine, which since 1920 had been administered by Great Britain.

In February 1948 the association launched its quarterly magazine, Unity, with Julian Rose its first editor. They then attempted affiliation with the NSW Board of Jewish Deputies, receiving 23 votes to 19, insufficient to reach the Board's necessary two-thirds majority. Rose stated that the reason for the Association's application was their desire to combat anti-Semitism, which was not shared by the Board. Issue number 12 appeared in August 1950. The magazine survived its second year of publication but the first issue for 1951 was late then was no more.

The association, under the leadership of Chaim Brezniak re-branded itself as the Council to Combat Facism and Anti-Semitism.
