= Sam Philipe =

Israeli sculptor

Sam Philipe סם פיליפ
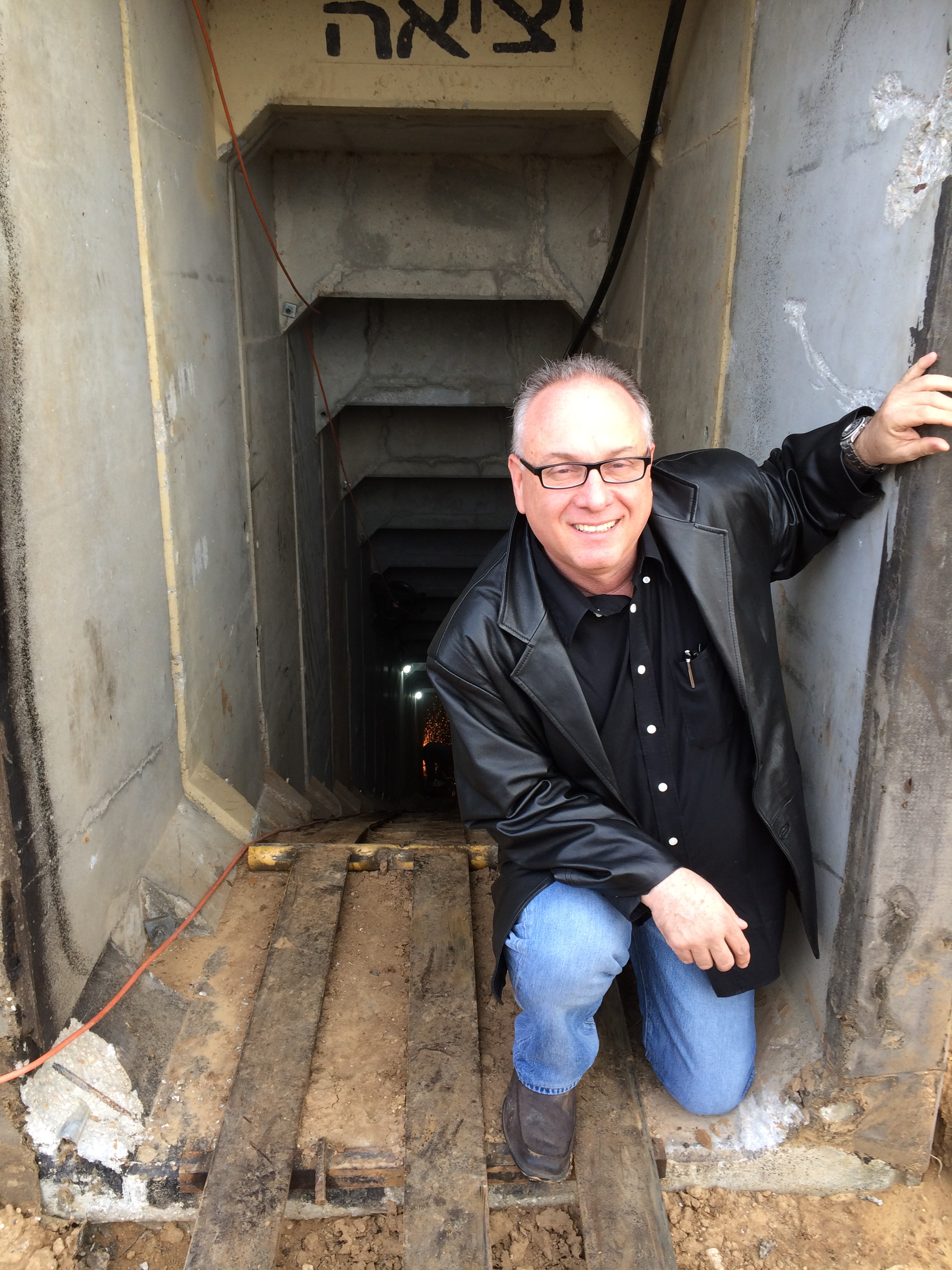
- Born: Jerusalem
- Known for: Biblical sculpture, jewelry

Sam Philipe (Hebrew: סם פיליפ) is an Israeli sculptor. He is known for his sculptures of biblical and New Testament figures.

== Early life and education ==
Shlomo (Sam) Philipe (Hebrew: סם פיליפ) was born in Jerusalem to an old Jerusalem family. After serving in the Israel Defense Forces as a combat medic, he spent a year in New York City restoring antique furniture and studying art. When he returned to Israel, he earned a living sculpting animals in chocolate.

== Art career ==
Philipe opened a studio in Jerusalem in 1989. In addition to sculpture, he began to design jewelry and Jewish ceremonial art.

Philipe's sculptures have been presented to government leaders around the world as gifts from the Israeli government. Philipe's statue "Jesus' blessing" was presented to Pope John Paul II on behalf of the Ministry of Religious Affairs. King Hussein of Jordan received a sculpture embodying Isaiah's prophecy of the lion and the lamb; George H. W. Bush, an elephant with the Star of David; and Princess Diana, a guardian angel. Yitzhak Rabin was presented with a sculpture depicting a paratrooper praying at the Western Wall.

Outdoor sculptures by Philipe have been installed at various locations in Jerusalem, and Israel; among them Ammunition Hill and Yad Labanim Soldiers House near Sacher Park. Many of his smaller sculptures, crafted from sterling silver and 24 karat gold, are mounted on polished stone bases using stones from the desert. Philipe often uses blocks of Jerusalem stone or black basalt from the Galilee as pedestals for his work.

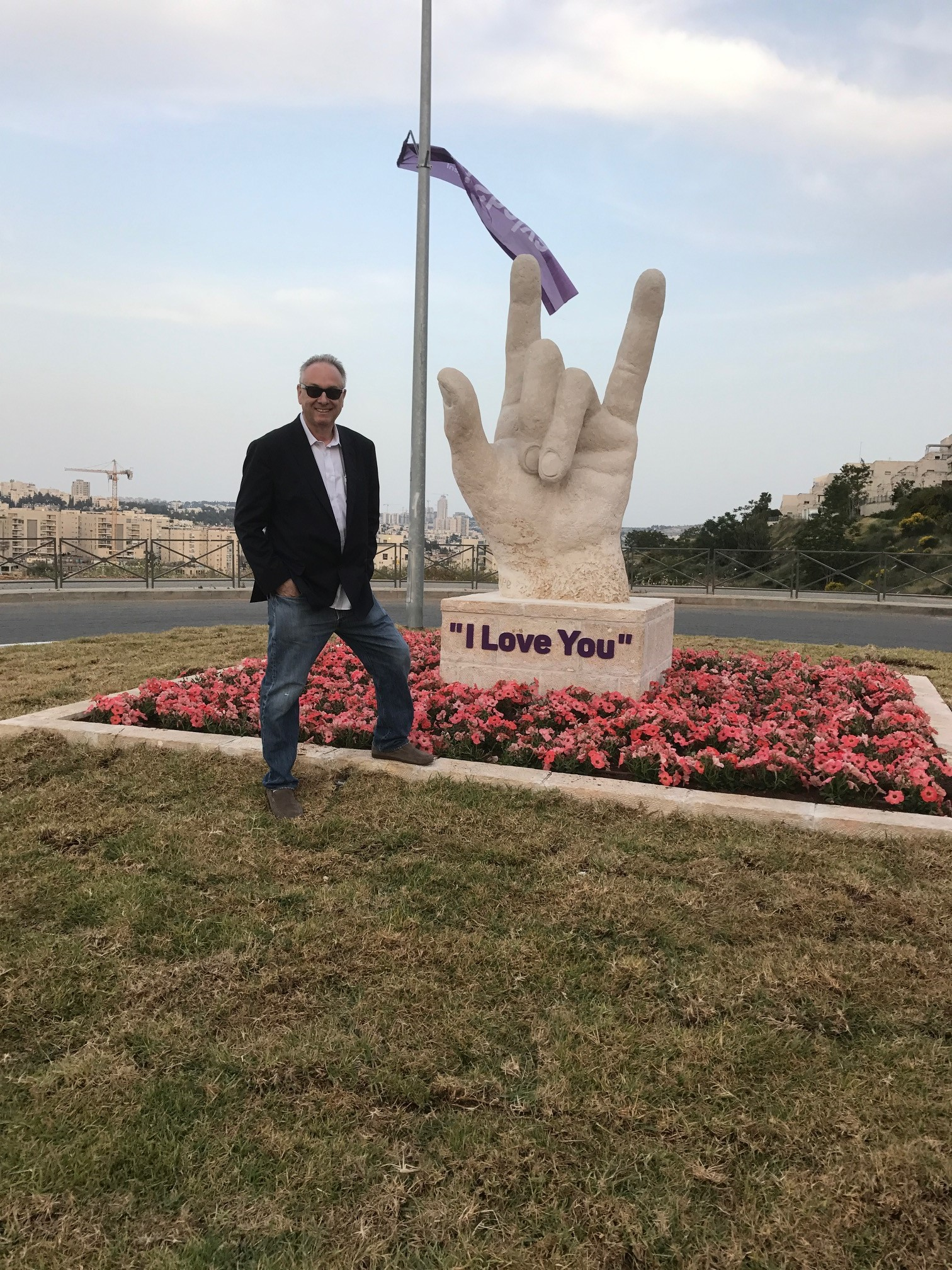
"I Love You," Shalva campus, Jerusalem

In February 2011, his bronze sculpture "Binding of Isaac" was displayed at Mamilla Mall as part of its "Stories of the Bible" exhibit.

"Mother and child," a sculpture by Philipe, is displayed at the Revi Karuna Memorial Museum in Alleppey, India. His seven-foot bronze statue of the Prodigal son was installed in the museum courtyard in March 2012.

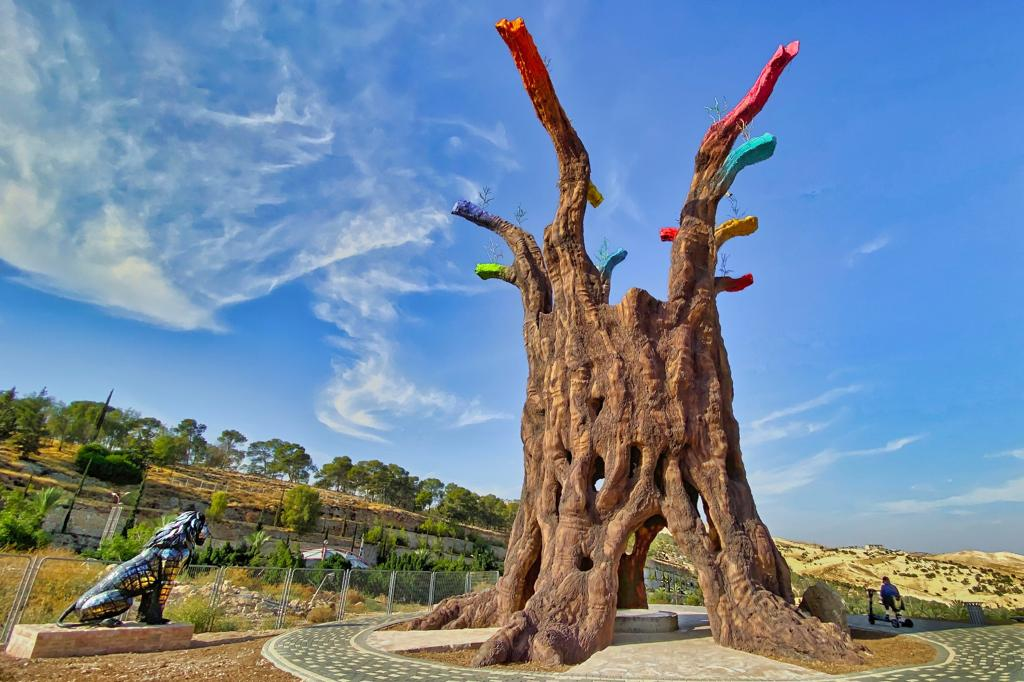
Tree of Life monument, Ma'aleh Adumim

"Reut" (Camaraderie in Arms) is a 10-foot bronze on Mount Scopus, overlooking the Judean Desert, depicting a combat medic embracing a wounded soldier. His inspiration for the work was an Israeli army doctor, Uri Freund, who was awarded the IDF medal of distinguished service for going out under heavy crossfire to rescue his wounded commander.

To mark the 70th anniversary of the voyage of the SS Exodus, Philipe designed a memorial sculpture featuring a bronze relief of the Land of Israel. The monument was unveiled at Haifa Port in July 2017.

Philipe's goal is to "reach God through art." He creates sculptures based on Bible themes in the belief that his work transports viewers back to ancient times and allows them to feel a connection to the Bible in their own life.

== Selected projects ==
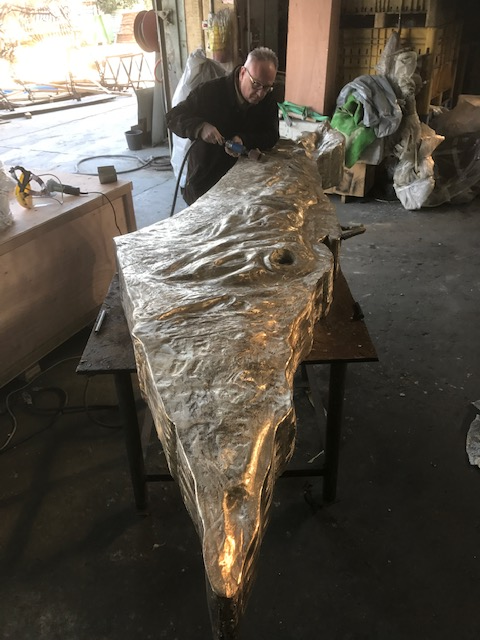
Sam Philipe working on the Exodus Memorial in the foundry

SS Exodus Memorial, Haifa 2017

The Exodus, nicknamed the "Ship that Launched a Nation" by writer Ruth Gruber, was an American Aliyah Bet ship that attempted to bring in 5,400 desperate Holocaust survivors. The Exodus' story fundamentally affected the United Nations vote on the United Nations Partition Plan for Palestine dividing Mandatory Palestine into two States, one Jewish and one Arab. The sculpture consists of a relief map of Israel with a model of the Exodus anchor.

Machal Memorial, Ammunition Hill, Jerusalem 2018

The Memorial commemorates the 5,000 foreign volunteers who helped defend the new state of Israel in the 1948 War of Independence. The rock is adorned with sculpted models of the three military corps that the volunteers served in, Navy, Air Force and Army. .

Tree of Life, Ma'aleh Adumim

In June 2022, Tree of Life, a 60-ton steel and concrete sculpture based on Kabbalistic symbolism, was installed in Park Shamir overlooking a lake at the entrance to Ma'aleh Adumim. The sculpture, shaped like the trunk of an old, gnarled olive tree, is 18 meters high and 7 meters wide.

Hands of Choice, Tzfat

The Hands of Choice is a memorial in Tzfat created to honor ordinary Jews who chose to save Jews, even at the cost of their own lives. The design is two upturned hands cupping a Star of David. Each facet of the Star has a Jerusalem stone panel inscribed with the names of these heroic Jews."

== Gallery ==
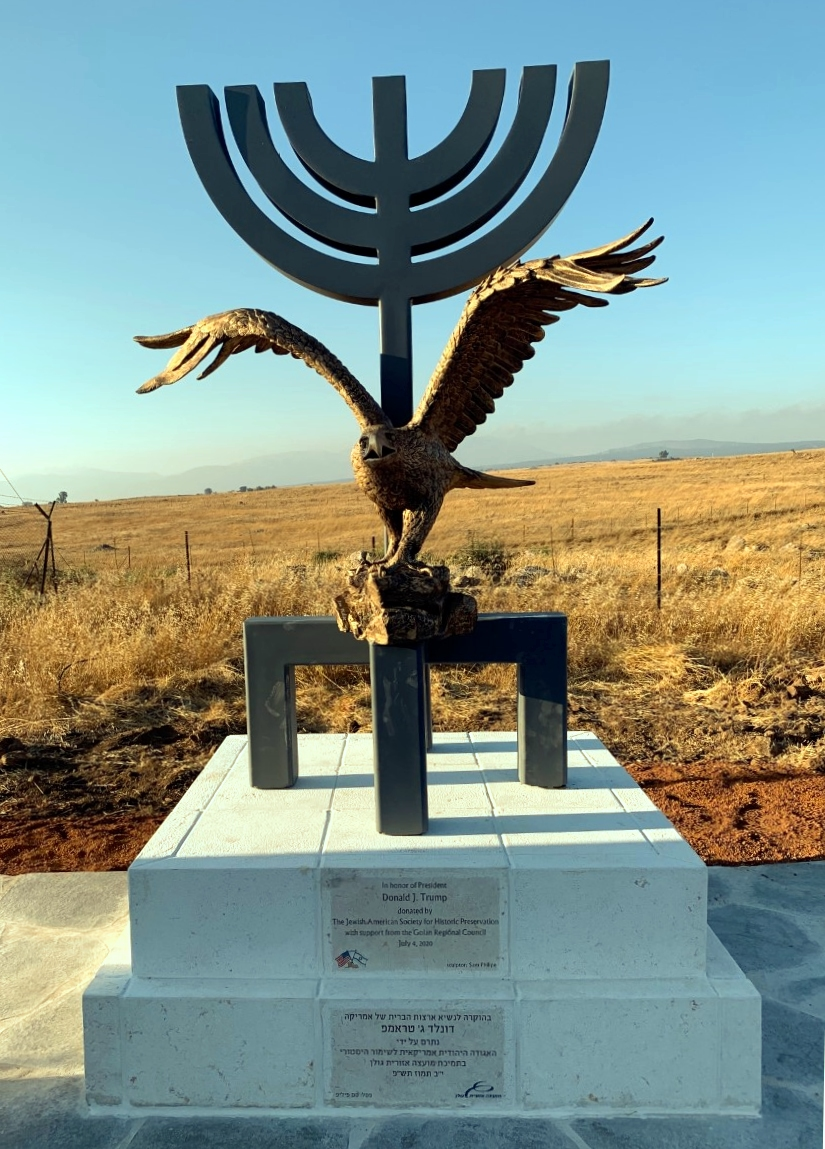
Golan Heights Eagle

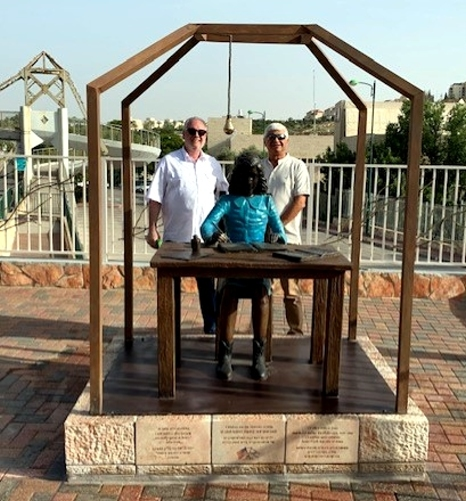
Anne Frank Children's Human Rights Memorial, Ma'ale Adumim

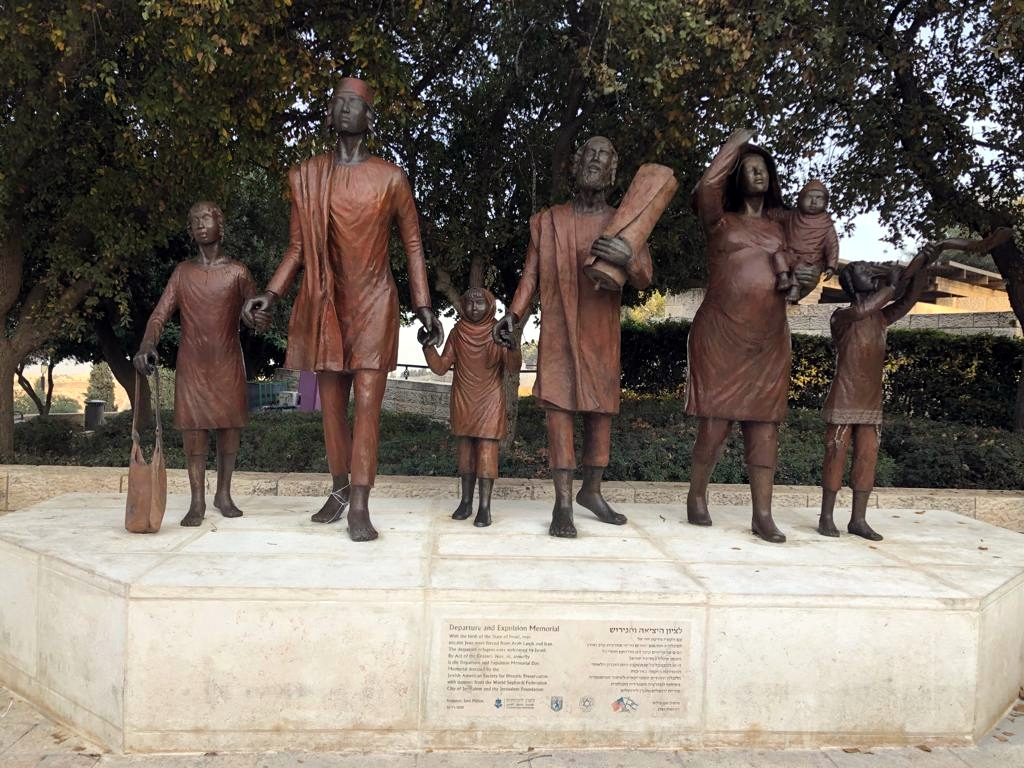
Departure and Expulsion Memorial

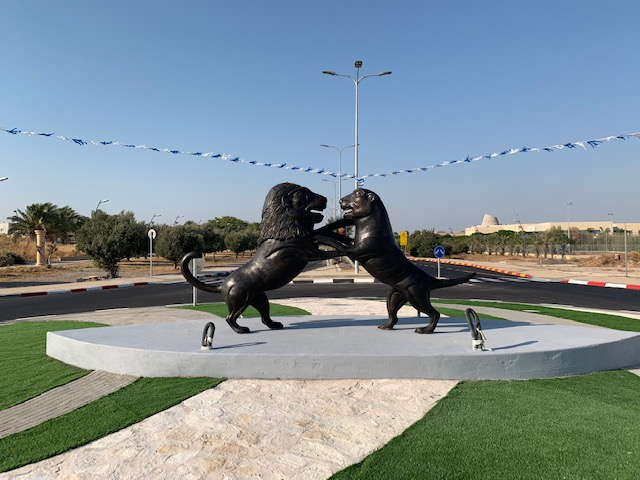
Temple Lions, Beit Shean Roundabout

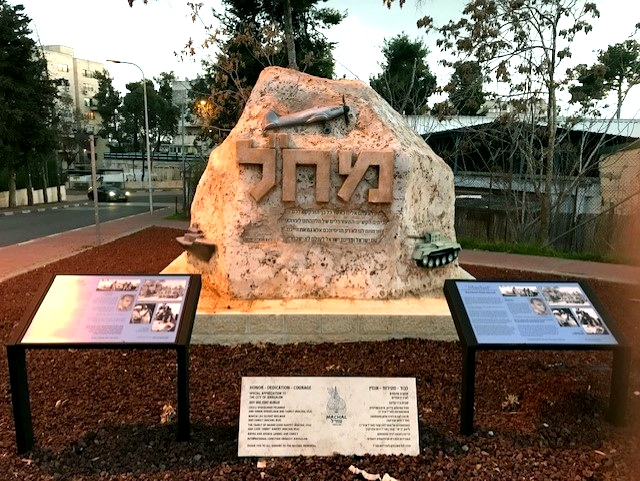
Machal Memorial, opposite Ammunition Hill, Jerusalem

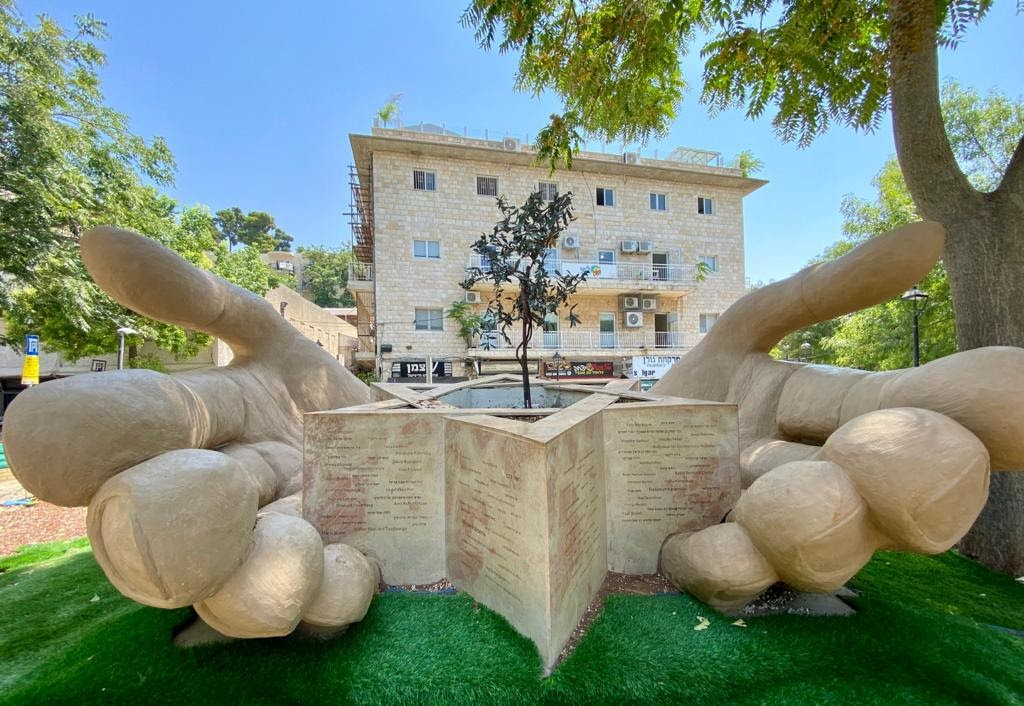
Hands of Choice monument, Tzfat

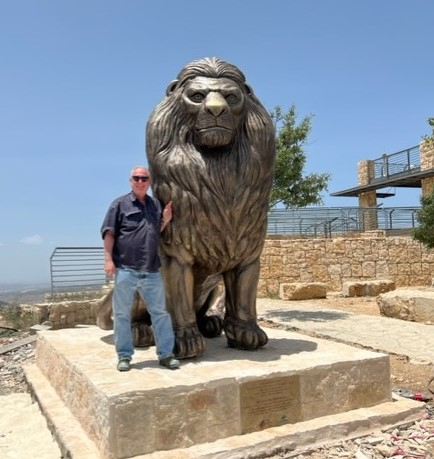
Mitzpeh HaEleph Gush Etzion

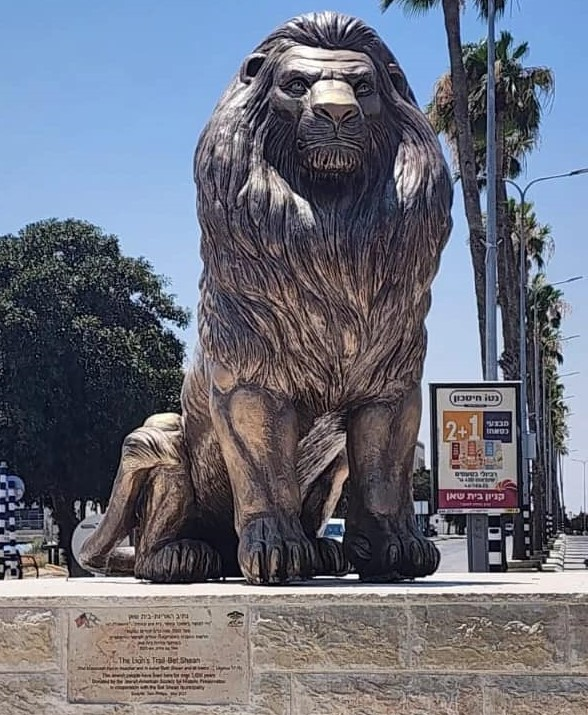
Lion's Trail Beit Shean

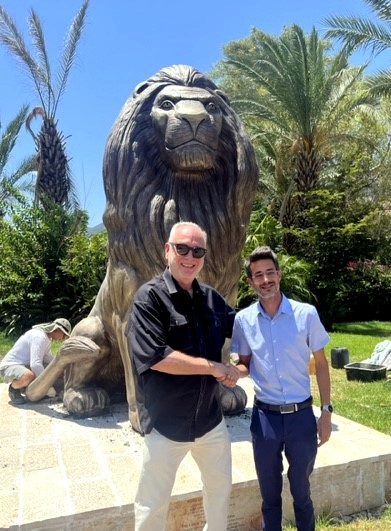
Lion's Trail Kiryat Shemona

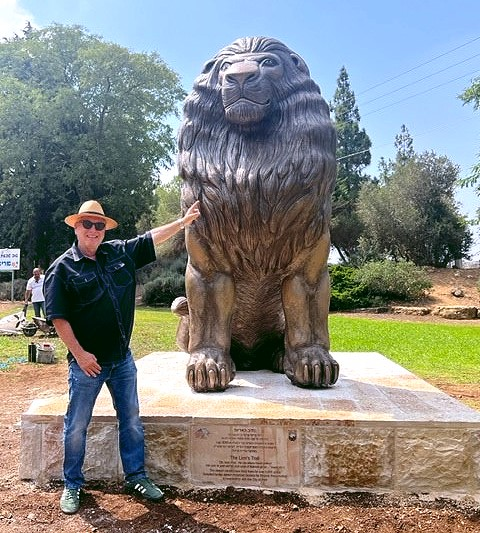
Lion's Trail Ariel

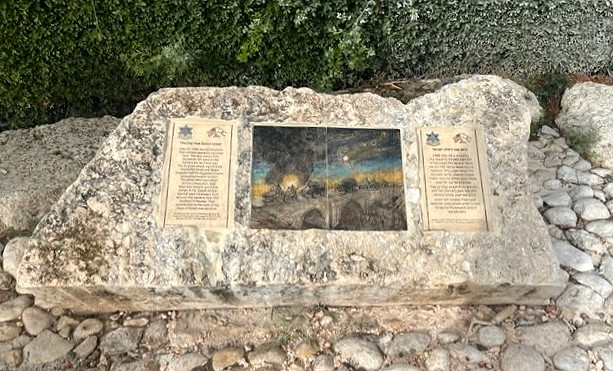
Ad Halom, Ashdod Air Force Memorial - 1948 War of Independence

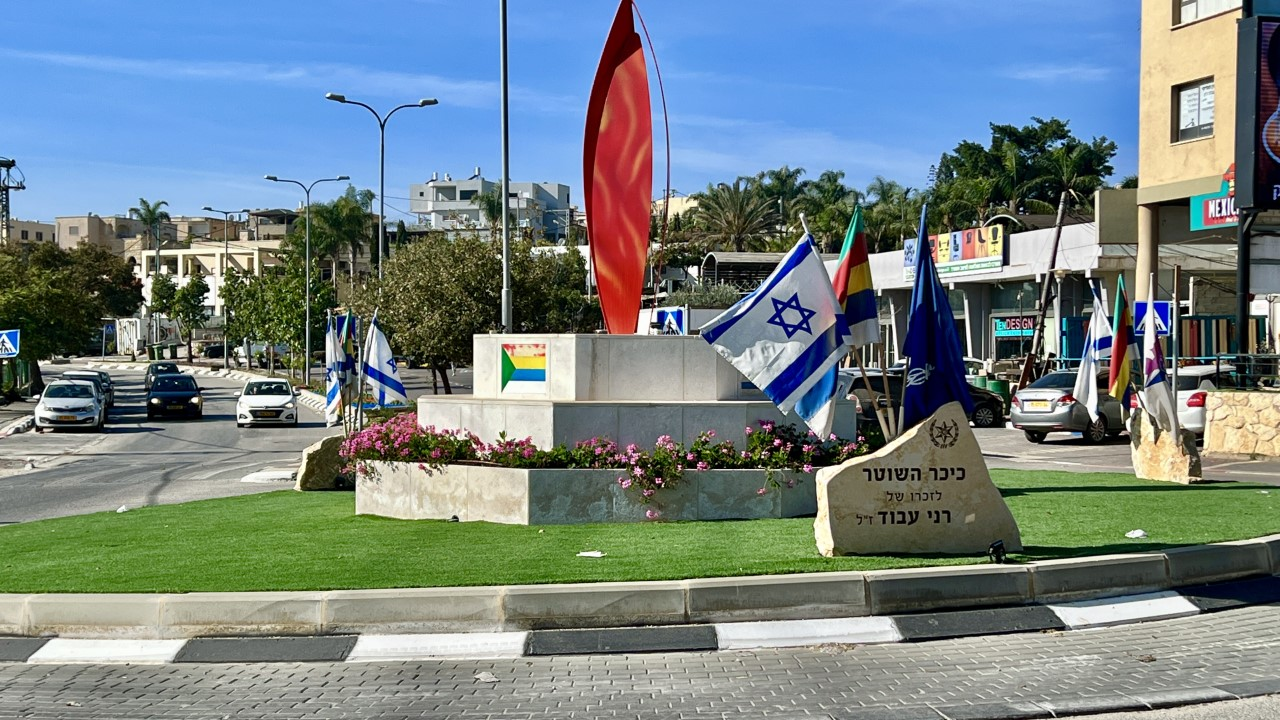
Druze-Israeli Friendship Memorial Daliyat al-Karmel

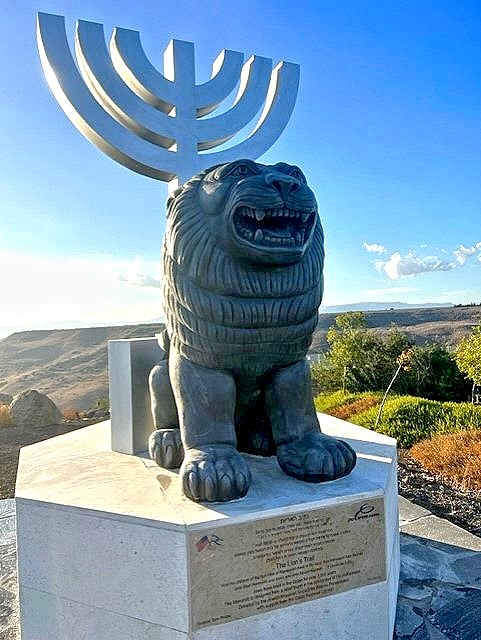
Golan Lion, Ein HaKeshatot

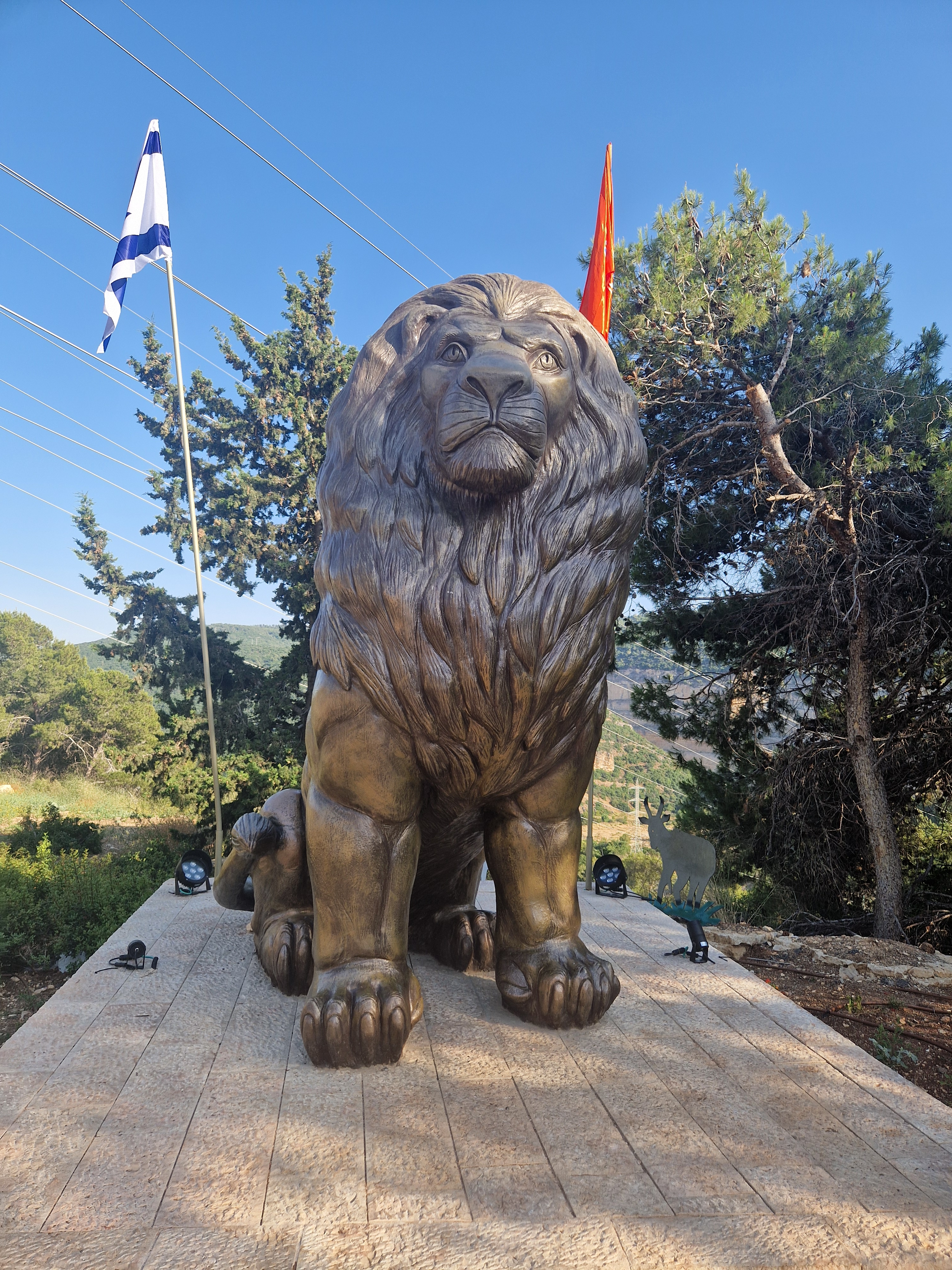
A lion statue at the entrance to Nesher Park

== See also ==
- Visual arts in Israel
- Religious art
- Outdoor sculpture
