= SS Exodus =

United States packet steamship

Coordinates: 32.8201°N 35.0045°E

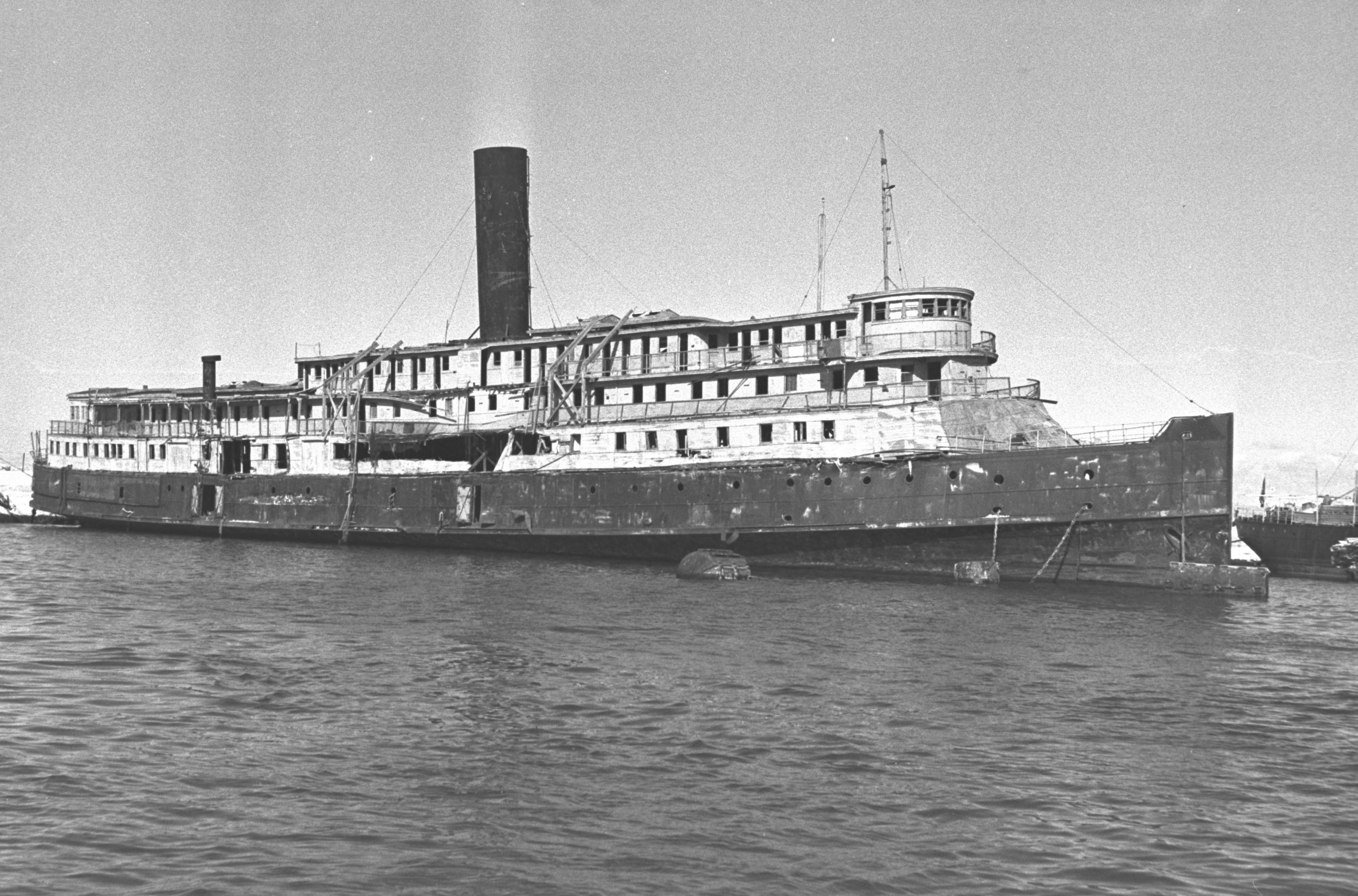
- Exodus 1947 derelict in Haifa in 1952

History
- Name: 1927: Florida (intended); 1927–44, 1945–47: President Warfield; 1944–45: USS President Warfield; 1947: Exodus 1947
- Namesake: 1927: S. Davies Warfield; 1947: The Exodus
- Owner: 1928–42: Baltimore Steam Packet Co; 1942–43: Ministry of War Transport; 1943–47: War Shipping Administration; 1947: Haganah
- Operator: 1928–42: Baltimore Steam Packet Co; 1942–43: Coast Lines, Ltd; 1944–45: United States Navy; 1947: Mossad LeAliyah Bet
- Port of registry: 1928–42, 1943–47: (United States) Baltimore; 1942–43: (United Kingdom) Southampton; 1947: Israel
- Route: 1928–42: Norfolk – Baltimore
- Ordered: 22 August 1927
- Builder: Pusey and Jones, Wilmington
- Yard number: 399
- Completed: 1928
- In service: 1928
- Out of service: 1947
- Identification: US official number 227753; code letters MOVN (1928–33); call sign KGQC (1934–42, 1943–47); UK official number 167862 (1942–43); call sign BKMS (1942–43); US Navy pennant number: IX-169 (1944–45)
- Fate: Sunk as breakwater

General characteristics
- Type: packet boat
- Tonnage: as built: 1,814 GRT, 1,706 NRT; from 1942: 4,273 GRT, 2,611 NRT
- Length: 320.0 ft (97.5 m)
- Beam: 56.6 ft (17.3 m)
- Draught: 18 ft 6 in (5.64 m)
- Depth: 16.9 ft (5.2 m)
- Decks: as built: 1; from 1942: 2
- Installed power: 486 NHP
- Propulsion: quadruple expansion engine
- Speed: 15 kn (28 km/h)
- Capacity: 540 passengers
- Troops: 605
- Complement: 70
- Armament: 1942: 1 × three-inch 12-pounder gun; 4 × 20mm guns

Exodus 1947 was a packet steamship that was built in the United States in 1928 as President Warfield for the Baltimore Steam Packet Company – named for the company's recently deceased president. From her completion in 1928 until 1942 she carried passengers and freight across the Chesapeake Bay between Norfolk, Virginia and Baltimore, Maryland.

From 1942 President Warfield served in the Second World War as a barracks and training ship for the British Armed Forces. In 1944 she was commissioned into the United States Navy as USS President Warfield (IX-169), a station and accommodation ship for the D-Day landing on Omaha Beach.

In 1947, she was renamed Exodus 1947 to take part in Aliyah Bet. She took 4,515 Jewish migrants from France to Mandatory Palestine. Most were Holocaust survivors who had no legal immigration certificates for Palestine. The Royal Navy boarded her in international waters and took her to Haifa, where ships were waiting to return the migrants to refugee camps in Europe.

== Building ==
Pusey and Jones built President Warfield in Wilmington, Delaware, as hull number 399. She was launched in 1927 and completed in 1928. She was a sister ship of the Baltimore Steam Packet Co's State of Maryland and State of Virginia, which had been completed in 1922 and 1923 respectively.

The ship was originally to be called Florida. However, S. Davies Warfield, who was President of the Baltimore Steam Packet Co and its parent company, the Seaboard Air Line Railroad, died while she was being built, so she was named President Warfield in his honor.

Like her sisters, President Warfield's registered length was 320.0 ft (97.5 m), her beam was 56.6 ft (17.3 m) and her depth was 16.9 ft (5.2 m). As built, her tonnages were 1,814 GRT and 706 NRT. She had a single propeller, powered by a quadruple expansion steam engine.

== Baltimore Steam Packet ==
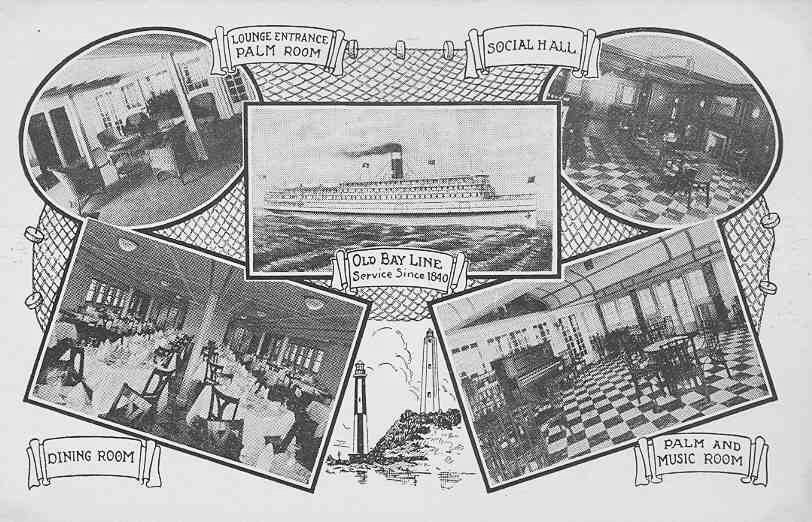
1928 postcard promoting the Baltimore Steam Packet Co packet boats

The Baltimore Steam Packet Co registered President Warfield in Baltimore. Her US official number was 227753, and until 1933 her code letters were MOVN.

Until 1942 President Warfield and her sisters worked a packet route on the Chesapeake Bay between Norfolk, Virginia and Baltimore, Maryland. She was built as a coal-burner, but in 1933 she was converted to oil fuel. In 1934 her code letters were superseded by the new call sign KGQC.

President Warfield was modernised with the installation of a fire sprinkler system in 1938, and wireless direction finding and ship-to-shore telephone in 1939.

== Second World War ==
On July 12, 1942, the War Shipping Administration (WSA) acquired President Warfield and several other US East Coast packet ships for the British Ministry of War Transport. Having been built only for service in the relatively sheltered waters of the Chesapeake Bay, President Warfield needed to be altered to cross the North Atlantic safely. Her superstructure was cut back, and a "turtle-back" covering was built onto the forward end of her superstructure to withstand heavy seas. She was fitted with cargo ship masts and derricks. She was fitted with one three-inch 12-pounder gun on her stern as main armament, plus four 20mm anti-aircraft guns. She was repainted in plain gray. The alterations increased President Warfield's tonnages to 4,273 GRT and 2,611 NRT.

In September 1942 President Warfield sailed to Britain via Boston, Halifax, Nova Scotia and St John's, Newfoundland. From Boston onward she was escorted in convoys. Coast Lines of Liverpool, England, provided British Merchant Navy crews for President Warfield and the other coastal packet ships to bring them from the US to Britain. A crew commanded by Captain JR Williams took over President Warfield, and on September 21, 1942, she left St John's in Convoy RB 1 to Liverpool.

=== Convoy RB 1 ===
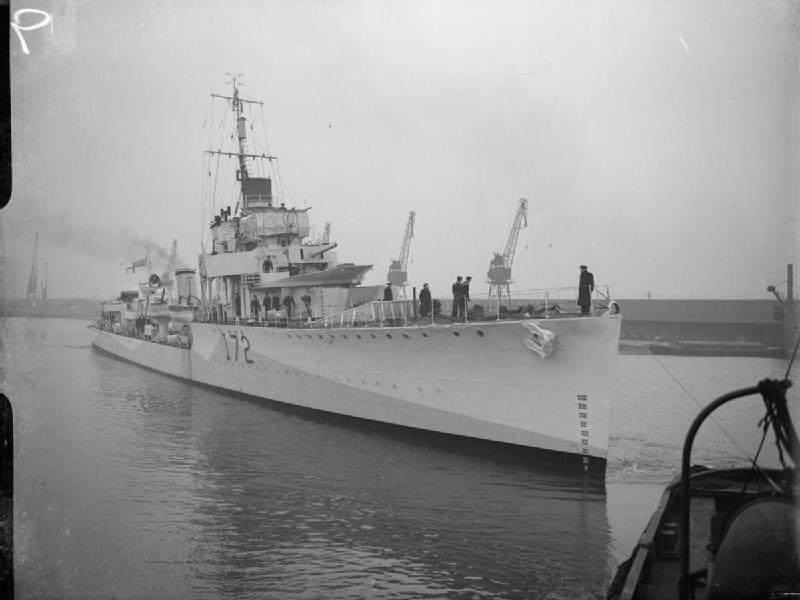
HMS Veteran, one of Convoy RB 1's escorts, which was sunk with all hands as the convoy dispersed

Convoy RB 1 officially comprised eight merchant ships, escorted by two Royal Navy destroyers: HMS Vanoc and Veteran. On the afternoon of September 25 a U-boat wolf pack attacked the convoy about 800 nautical miles (1,500 km) west of Ireland. U-216 fired a spread of four torpedoes, two of which hit RB 1's commodore ship—the 4,989 GRT packet ship Boston—sinking her with the loss of 17 of her crew. HMS Veteran and the packet ships New Bedford and Northland rescued 49 survivors.

The 3,117 GRT packet ship Southland twice sighted a periscope, but each time drove off the submarine with rapid fire from her 12-pounder gun. A torpedo was fired at President Warfield, but the packet boat quickly turned parallel to it and the torpedo passed by about 30 feet (9 m) off her port beam. Two minutes later President Warfield sighted a submarine near her port quarter and opened fire with her 12-pounder. HMS Veteran joined in the action with depth charges.

Just before midnight, U-96 fired a spread of two torpedoes, hitting Boston's 4,989 GRT sister ship, New York, which was the vice-commodore's ship. 38 men were killed, the survivors abandoned ship, and an hour and a half later U-91 sank her drifting hulk. HMS Veteran stopped to rescue survivors but U-404 torpedoed the destroyer, sinking her with all hands in the early hours of September 26.

The convoy dispersed but the attack continued. Late on the evening of September 26, U-619 torpedoed the steamship Yorktown, sinking her with the loss of 18 men. Two days later the destroyer HMS Sardonyx rescued 42 survivors. President Warfield escaped further attack, and reached Belfast, Northern Ireland independently. Other surviving ships from the convoy reached Derry and Greenock.

The convoy lost a total of three packet ships, one destroyer and 131 men, but the other five ships safely reached the British Isles. Posthumous decorations were awarded to some of the officers lost. In May 1943 the master and chief engineer of each of the five surviving ships, including Captain Williams and his Chief Engineer, was made an OBE.

=== European war service ===
From Belfast, President Warfield continued to England, where she moored in the River Torridge at Instow on the north coast of Devon. There she served as a Combined Operations training and barracks ship for the Royal Marines and Commandos. She provided accommodation for 105 officers and 500 other ranks.

In July 1943, the British Government returned President Warfield to US control. On May 21, 1944, she was commissioned into the US Navy as USS President Warfield, with the pennant number IX-169. In July she served as a station and accommodations ship off Omaha Beach on the coast of Normandy.

After service in England and on the Seine in France, she arrived at Norfolk, Virginia, July 25, 1945. She left active Navy service on September 13, was struck from the US Naval Vessel Register on October 11 and was returned to the War Shipping Administration on November 14. She then spent about a year moored in the James River, where she was one of many ships laid up as surplus after the end of the war.

== Jewish refugees ==
After World War II, about 250,000 European Jews were living in displaced persons camps in Germany and Austria. Zionist organizations began organizing an underground network known as the Brichah ("escape", in Hebrew), which moved thousands of Jews from the camps to ports on the Mediterranean where ships took them illegally to Palestine. This was part of the Aliyah Bet immigration that began after the war. At first many made their way to Palestine on their own. Later, they received financial and other help from sympathizers around the World. The ships were crewed mostly by volunteers from the United States, Canada and Latin America. Under Aliyah Bet, more than 100,000 people tried to illegally migrate to Palestine.

The British government opposed large-scale immigration. Displaced person camps run by American, French and Italian officials often turned a blind eye to the situation, with only British officials restricting movement in and out of their camps. In 1945 the British government reaffirmed its 1939 policy limiting Jewish immigration which it adopted after a quarter of a million European Jews arrived fleeing Nazism, and Palestine's Arab population rebelled. The British government deployed naval and military forces to turn back the refugees. More than half of 142 voyages were stopped by British patrols, and most intercepted migrants were sent to internment camps in Cyprus, the Atlit detention camp in Palestine, or to Mauritius. About 50,000 people ended up in camps, more than 1,600 drowned at sea, and only a few thousand reached Palestine.

Of the 64 vessels that sailed in Aliyah Bet, Exodus 1947 was the largest. She carried 4,515 passengers, the largest-ever number of illegal immigrants to Palestine. The story received much international attention, thanks in large part to dispatches from American journalist Ruth Gruber. The incident took place near the end of Aliyah Bet and toward the end of the British mandate, after which Britain withdrew from Palestine and the state of Israel was founded. Historians say Exodus 1947 helped unify the Jewish community of Palestine and the Holocaust-survivor refugees in Europe as well as significantly deepening international sympathy for the plight of Holocaust survivors and rallying support for the idea of a Jewish state. One called the story of the Exodus 1947 a "spectacular publicity coup for the Zionists."

== Voyage preparations ==
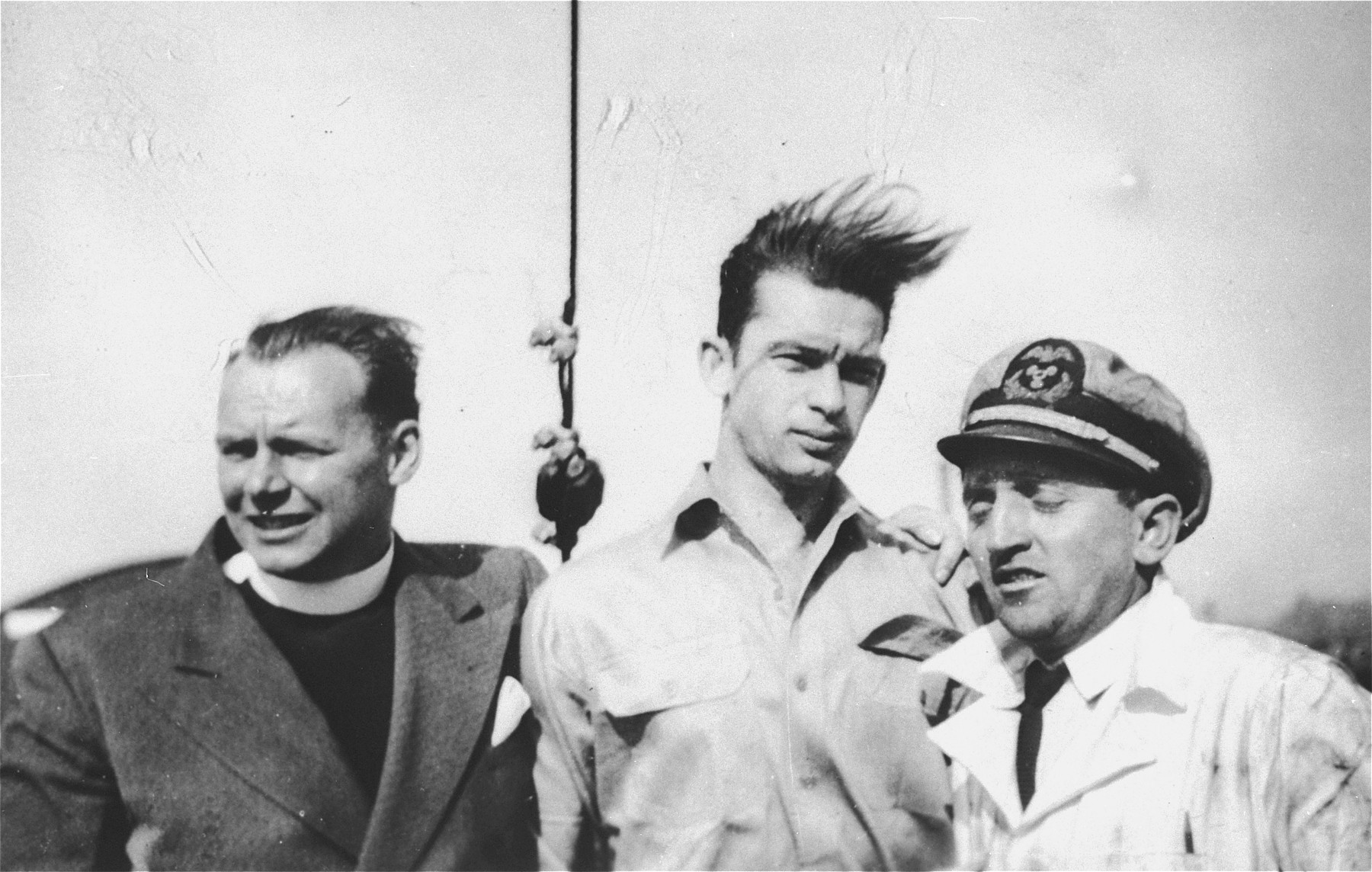
John Stanley Grauel, Yaakov Oron (Garbash) and Aryeh Kolomeitzev (later Kole) aboard President Warfield before she sailed to Europe

On November 9, 1946, the Potomac Shipwrecking Company of Washington, D.C. bought President Warfield from the WSA for $8,028. The company was acting for the Haganah Jewish paramilitary organization, and two days later sold her for $40,000 to the Weston Trading Company of New York, which was a Haganah front organization. Zionist supporters in Baltimore funded her purchase. Haganah transferred her to Mossad LeAliyah Bet, the branch of Haganah that ran Aliyah Bet.

Haganah spent another $125,000 to $130,000 repairing, overhauling and modifying the ship for her voyage to Palestine. Britain had recently announced that it would begin deporting illegal immigrants to Cyprus rather than Atlit. Mossad LeAliyah Bet responded by deciding that migrants should resist capture. President Warfield was deemed well-suited for this because she was relatively fast, sturdy enough to not easily capsize, made of steel which would help her to withstand ramming, and was taller than the Royal Navy destroyers that would be trying to board her.

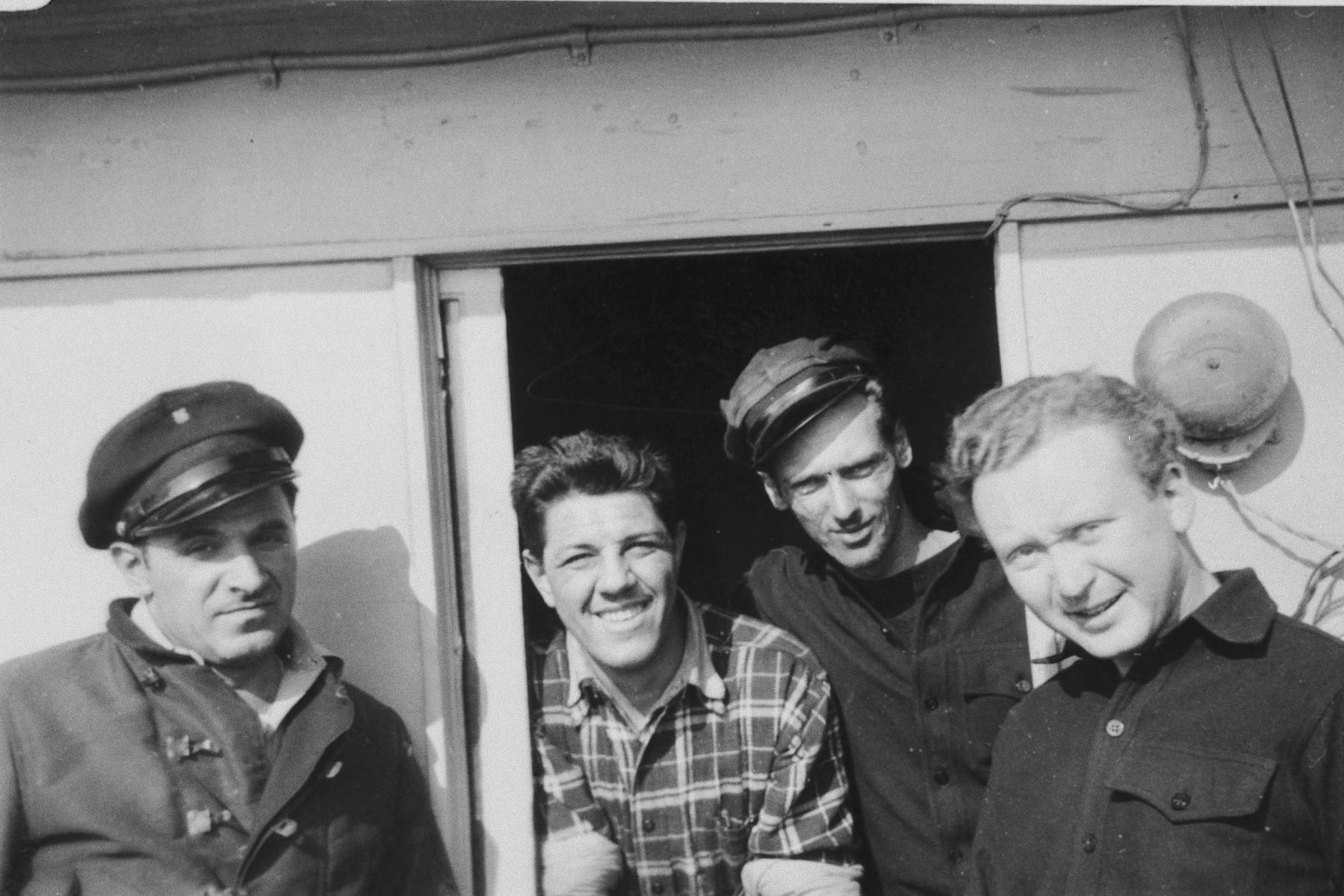
Four members of the crew aboard President Warfield in Baltimore. On the right is Second Officer William Bernstein, who was killed in July 1947 when the Royal Navy boarded the ship.

President Warfield was also chosen because of her derelict condition. It was risky to put passengers on her, and it was felt this would either compel the British authorities to let her pass the blockade because of the danger, or damage Britain's international reputation.

For months, teams of Palestinian Jews and Americans worked on Exodus 1947 in order to make it harder for British forces to her take over. Metal pipes, designed to spray out steam and boiling oil, were installed around the ship's perimeter. Lower decks were covered in nets and barbed wire. Her engine room, boiler room, wheelhouse and radio room were covered in wire and reinforced to prevent entry by British soldiers.

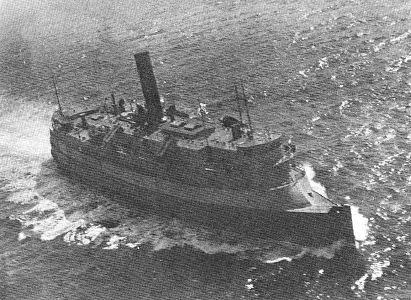
President Warfield off Cape Hatteras, North Carolina, in February 1947, on her abortive first attempt to reach France

Haganah re-registered President Warfield under the Honduran flag of convenience. On February 25, 1947, she left Baltimore for Marseille, but she ran into bad weather in the Virginia Capes and then a heavy sea about 75 nautical miles (139 km) east of Diamond Shoals. Her forward hold began to leak, and she radioed the United States Coast Guard for help. The tanker E. W. Sinclair picked up her distress message, found President Warfield and stood by. The coast guard cutter USCGC Cherokee arrived to tow her back to safety, but the weather eased and President Warfield was able to reach Norfolk, VA under her own power.

After her damage was surveyed in Norfolk, President Warfield spent a fortnight in Philadelphia being repaired. She then sailed via the Azores to Porto Venere in Italy, where she was refitted and bunkered. In July 1947, she arrived at Sète on the south coast of France.

== Voyage to Palestine ==
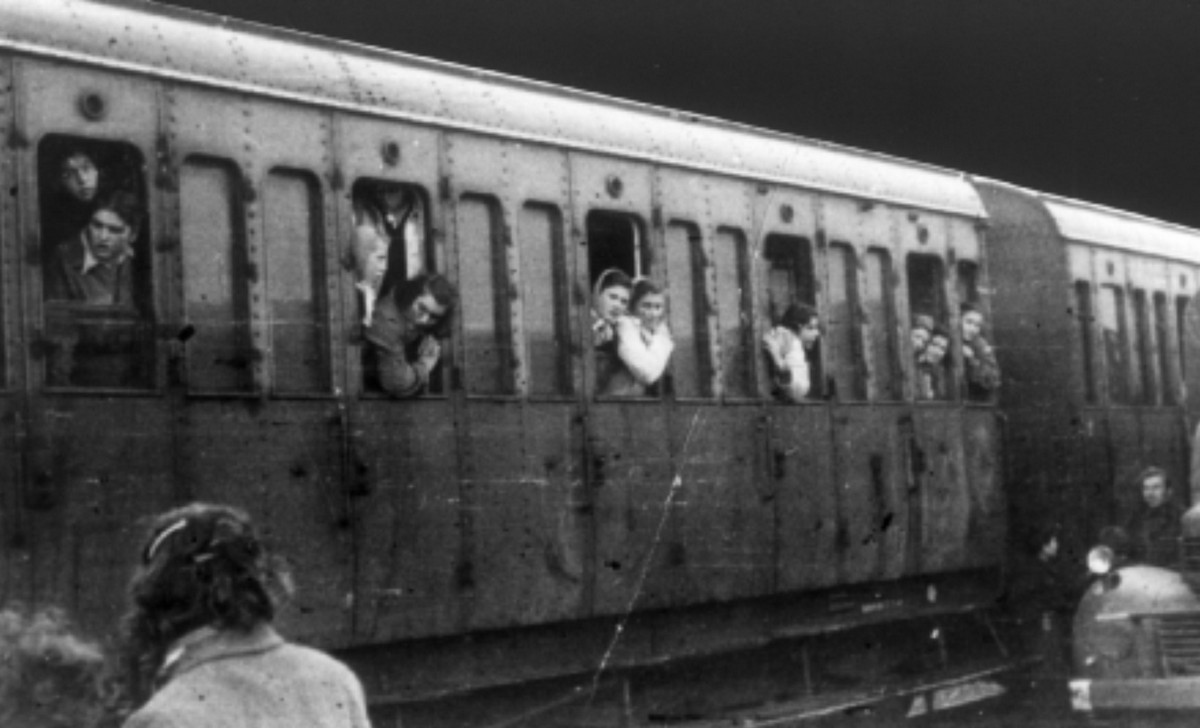
Jewish refugees on a train on their way to Sète to embark on President Warfield

As a packet boat President Warfield had been certificated to carry 540 passengers. In the war she had been converted to provide berths for 605 troops. But more than 4,500 Jewish refugees arrived in Sète. Haganah issued them with 2,000 forged passports, with visas for Colombia, with which French immigration officers allowed them to embark on President Warfield. Each passport was used more than once in the same boarding, with a crewman collecting them and passing them back to refugees still waiting in the queue. Haganah secured the immigration officers' co-operation with bottles of alcohol and a group of Jewish young women to keep them occupied.

According to Israeli historian Aviva Halamish, the ship was never meant to "sneak out toward the shores of Palestine", but rather "to burst openly through the blockade, by dodging and swiftly nipping through, beaching herself on a sand bank and letting off her cargo of immigrants at the beach." The ship was too large and unusual to go unnoticed. Even as people began boarding the ship at the port of Sète near Montpellier, a Royal Air Force aircraft circled overhead and a Royal Navy warship waited a short distance out at sea.

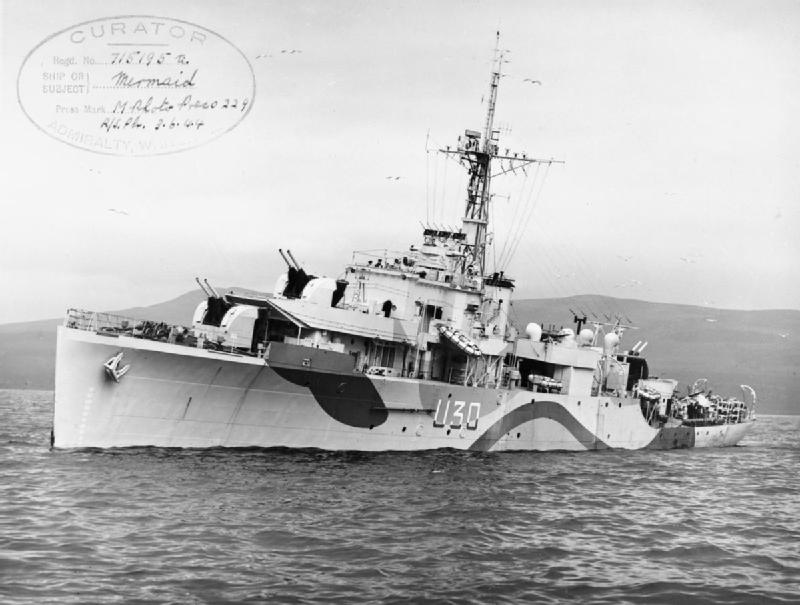
HMS Mermaid, which shadowed Exodus 1947 on the first part of her voyage to Palestine

President Warfield left Sète sometime between two and four in the morning of July 11, 1947, claiming to be bound for Istanbul. She carried 4,515 refugees including 1,600 men, 1,282 women, and 1,017 young people and 655 teenagers. Palmach (Haganah's military wing) captain Ike Aronowicz was her Captain and Haganah commissioner Yossi Harel commanded the operation. The ship was manned by a crew of some 35 volunteers, mostly American Jews.

All Aliyah Bet ships were renamed with Hebrew names designed to inspire and rally the Jews of Palestine. On July 17, Mossad LeAliyah Bet renamed the ship Exodus 1947 (and, in Hebrew, Yetz'iat (sic) Tasbaz, or Yetzi'at Eiropa Tashaz, "Flight from Europe 5707") after the biblical Jewish Exodus from Egypt to Canaan, and the refugees raised a flag with the Star of David. The name was proposed by Israeli politician and military figure Moshe Sneh, who at the time was in charge of illegal migration for the Jewish Agency. The name was later described by Israel's second Prime Minister Moshe Sharett (then Shertok) as "a stroke of genius, a name which by itself, says more than anything which has ever been written about it."

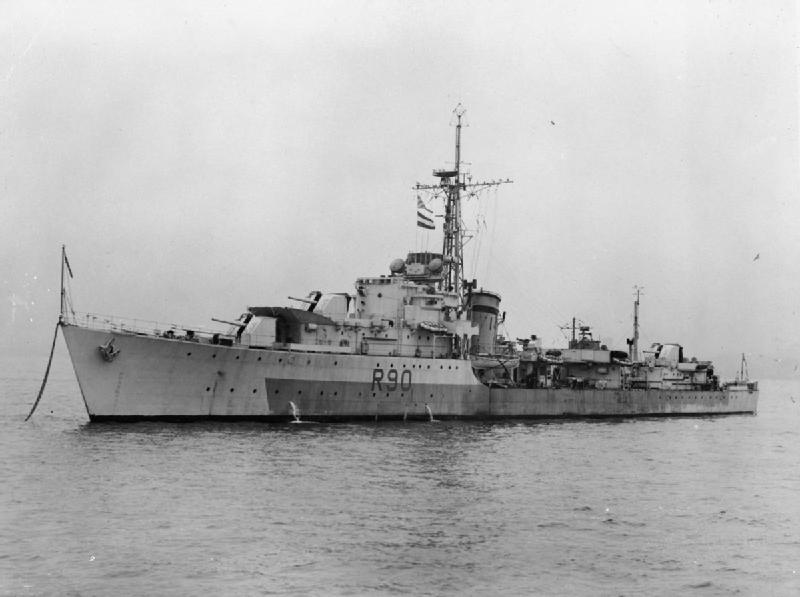
HMS Cheviot, which relieved HMS Mermaid

As the ship left port, the sloop HMS Mermaid and RAF aircraft shadowed her. Later, the destroyer HMS Cheviot relieved Mermaid. Each day during the voyage, the Royal Navy ship shadowing her came within hailing distance of Exodus 1947 and asked whether she was carrying any migrants to Palestine. Instead of answering the question, Exodus 1947 responded by playing one of Edward Elgar's Pomp and Circumstance Marches over her public address system.

Exodus 1947 carried enough supplies to last two weeks. Passengers were given cooked meals, hot drinks, soup, and one liter of drinking water daily. They washed in salt water. The ship had only 13 lavatories. A British military doctor, inspecting the ship after the battle, said that it was badly over-crowded, but that hygiene was satisfactory and the ship appeared well prepared to cope with casualties. Several babies were born during the week-long journey. One woman, Paula Abramowitz, died in childbirth. Her infant son died a few weeks later, in Haifa.

=== Interception ===
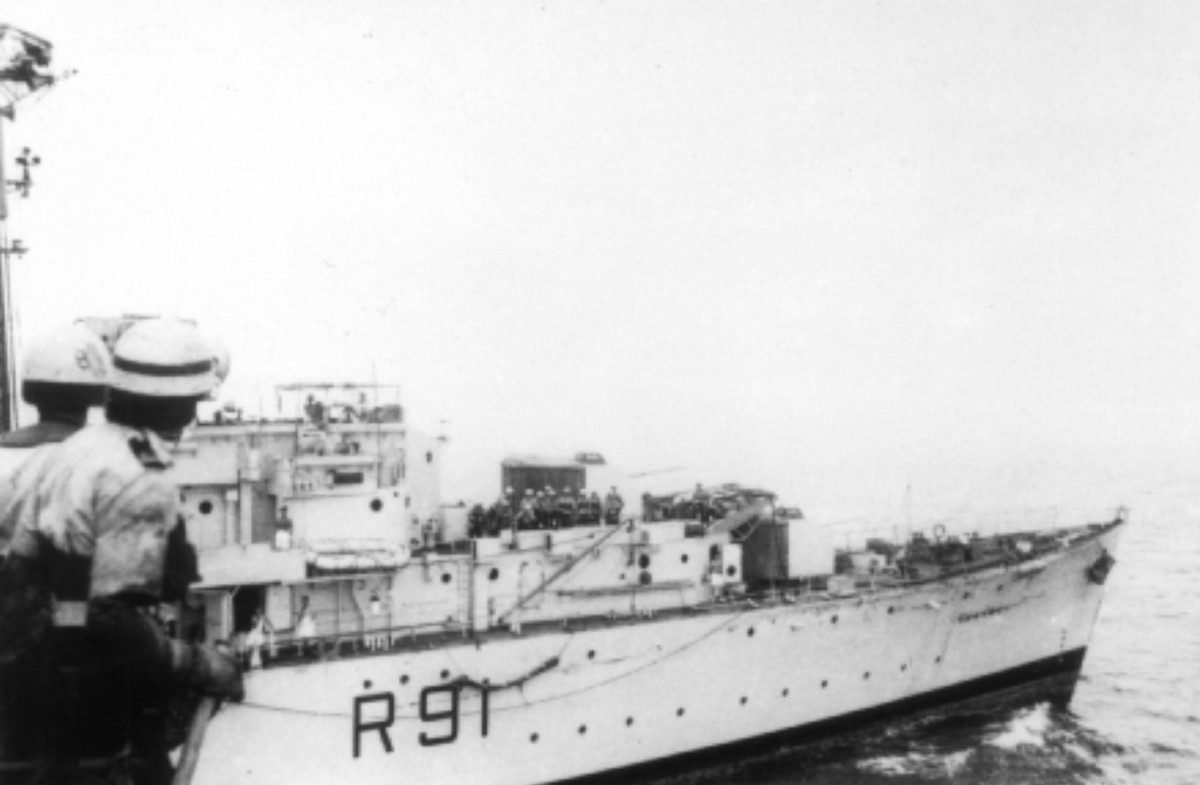
HMS Childers seen from Exodus 1947

During the journey, the people aboard Exodus 1947 prepared to be intercepted. The ship was divided into sections crewed by different groups, and each practiced resistance sessions. Her defences were augmented with sandbags around her wheelhouse and chicken wire along her upper decks. Small arms were issued to key personnel. As Exodus 1947 neared Palestinian territorial waters, her Royal Navy escort was increased to five destroyers and two minesweepers, led by the light cruiser HMS Ajax.

At about 0200 hrs on July 18, about 20 nautical miles (40 km) from the Palestinian coast, two Royal Navy destroyers came alongside Exodus 1947, one either side, converged on her, and jammed her between them. The destroyer HMS Childers struck Exodus 1947's port side' holing on her saloon deck above the waterline. Exodus 1947 released her liferafts to fall onto the decks of the two destroyers. The destroyers dropped gangways onto Exodus 1947 and sent a boarding party of 50 Royal Marines, armed with clubs and tear gas, onto the packet boat.

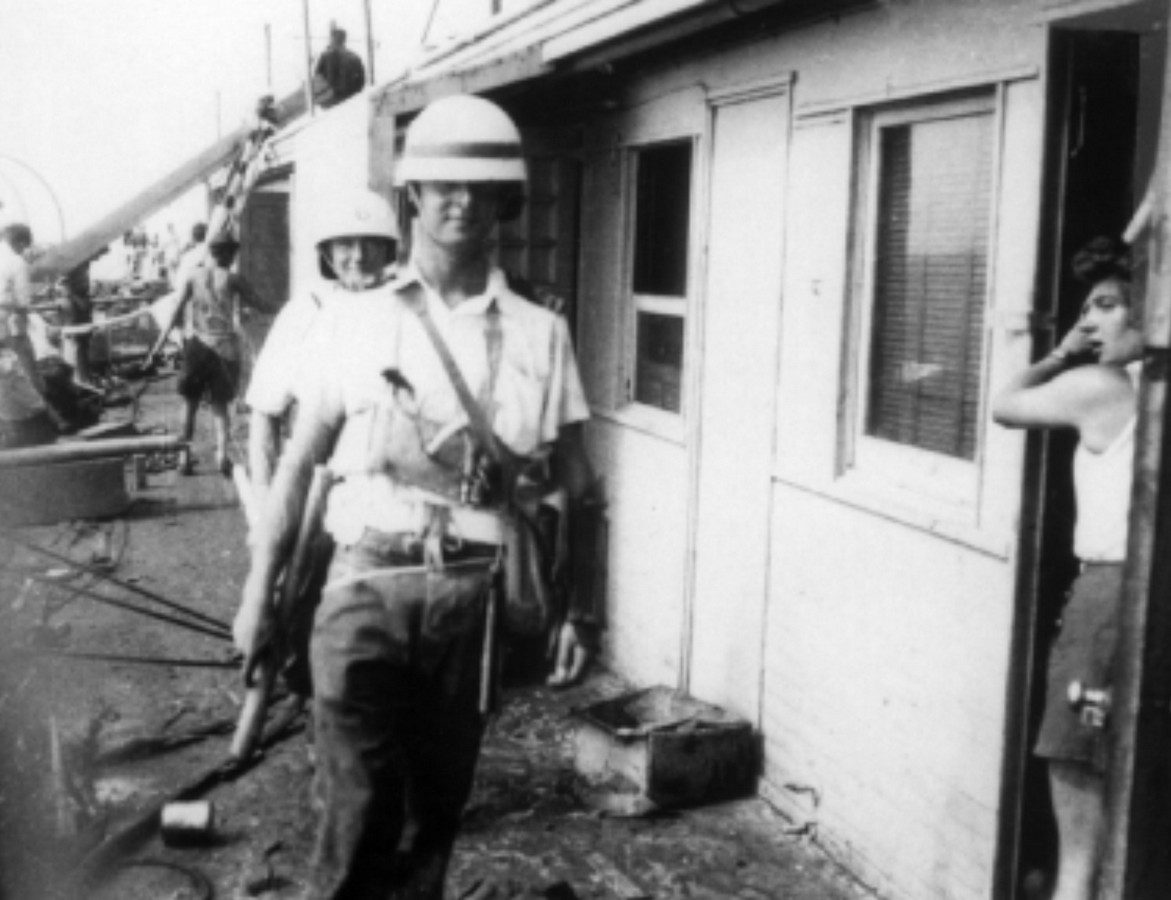
Helmeted members of the Royal Navy boarding party aboard Exodus 1947

Passengers and Haganah members aboard resisted the Marines. The second officer, an American Machal volunteer, Bill Bernstein, died from a skull fracture after being clubbed in the wheelhouse. Two passengers died of gunshot wounds. Two British sailors were treated afterwards for fractured scapula, and one for a head injury and lacerated ear, and 146 others were injured. About 10 Exodus 1947 passengers and crew were treated for mild injuries resulting from the boarding, and about 200 were treated for illnesses and maladies unrelated to it.

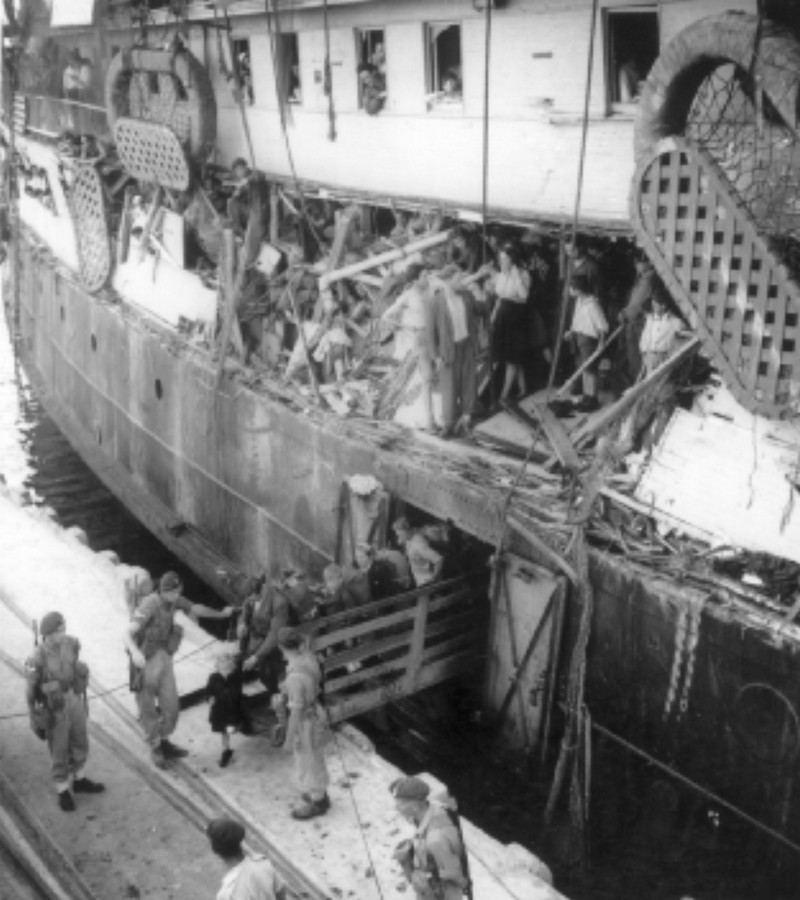
Close-up of Exodus 1947 just after her arrival in Haifa, showing some of the damage she sustained when the two destroyers intercepted her

Due to the high public profile of Exodus 1947 the British government decided to deport the migrants back to France. Foreign Secretary Ernest Bevin suggested this and the request was relayed to General Sir Alan Cunningham, High Commissioner for Palestine, who agreed with the plan after consulting the Navy. Before then, intercepted migrants were placed in internment camps on Cyprus, which was at the time a British colony. This new policy was meant to be a signal to both the Jewish community and the European countries which assisted immigration that whoever they sent to Palestine would be sent back to them.

Not only should it clearly establish the principle of refoulement as applies to a complete shipload of immigrants, but it will be most discouraging to the organisers of this traffic if the immigrants ... end up by returning whence they came.

== Repatriation ==
=== Attempted return to France ===
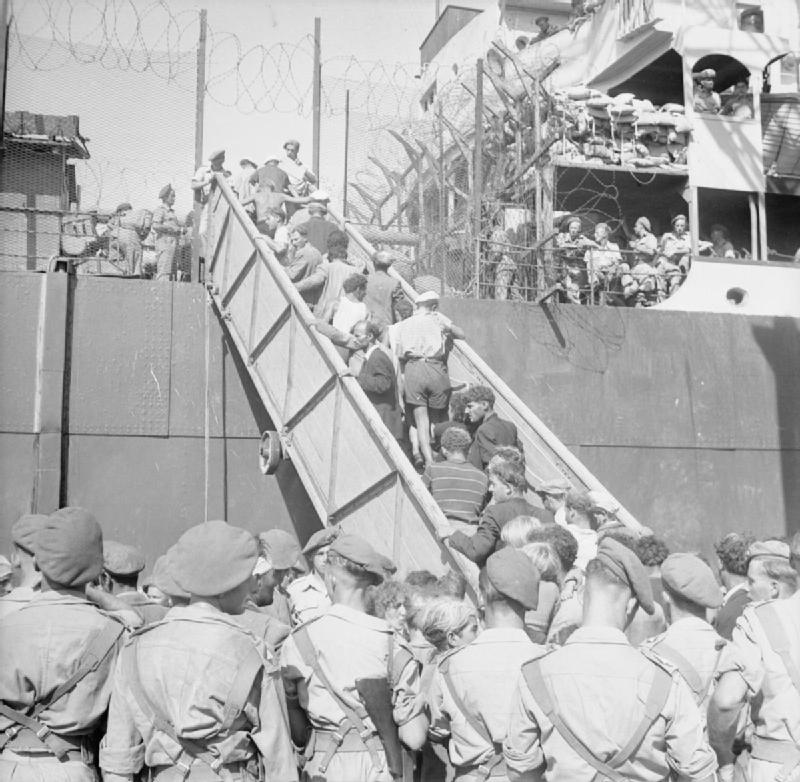
British troops putting Jewish refugees aboard Empire Rival

The Royal Navy brought Exodus 1947 into Haifa, where her passengers were transferred to three larger and more seaworthy ships for deportation: Empire Rival, Ocean Vigour and Runnymede Park. Members of the United Nations Special Committee on Palestine (UNSCOP) witnessed the transfer. The three ships left Haifa on July 19 for Port-de-Bouc near Marseille. Foreign Secretary Bevin insisted that the French get their ship back as well as its passengers.

When the ships arrived at Port-de-Bouc on August 2, the French Government said it would allow disembarkation of the passengers only if it was voluntary on their part. Haganah agents, both on board the ships and using launches with loudspeakers, encouraged the passengers not to disembark. Thus the migrants refused to disembark and the French refused to cooperate with British attempts at forced disembarkation. This left the British with the option of returning the passengers to Germany. Realizing that they were not bound for Cyprus, the migrants conducted a 24-day hunger strike and refused to cooperate with the British authorities.

Media coverage of the contest of wills put pressure on Britain to find a solution. The matter was reported to the UNSCOP members who had been deliberating in Geneva. For three weeks the refugees on the ships held firm in difficult conditions, rejecting offers of alternative destinations. Britain concluded that the only option was to send the Jews to camps in the British-controlled zone of post-war Germany.

=== Operation Oasis ===
The ships went from Marseille to Hamburg, which was then in the British occupation zone. Britain realized that returning the refugees to camps in Germany would elicit a public outcry, but Germany was the only territory under British control that could immediately accommodate so many people.

Britain's position was summed up by John Coulson, a diplomat at the British Embassy in Paris, in a message to the Foreign Office in London in August 1947: "You will realize that an announcement of decision to send immigrants back to Germany will produce violent hostile outburst in the press. ... Our opponents in France, and I dare say in other countries, have made great play with the fact that these immigrants were being kept behind barbed wire, in concentration camps and guarded by Germans." Coulson advised that Britain apply as best they could a counter-spin to the story: "If we decide it is convenient not to keep them in camps any longer, I suggest that we should make some play that we are releasing them from all restraint of this kind in accordance with their wishes and that they were only put in such accommodation for the preliminary necessities of screening and maintenance." The mission of bringing the Jewish refugees of Exodus 1947 back to Germany was known in diplomatic and military circles as "Operation Oasis".

=== Disembarkation in Germany ===
On August 22, a Foreign Office cable warned diplomats that they should be ready to emphatically deny that the Jews would be housed in former concentration camps in Germany and that German guards would not be used to keep the Jews in the refugee camps. It further added that British guards would be withdrawn once the Jews were screened.

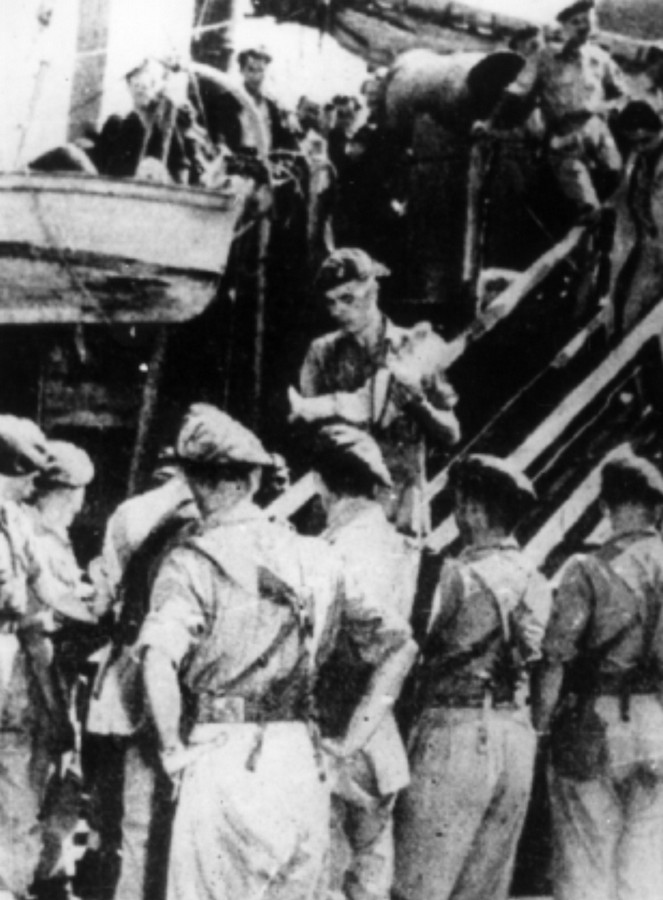
British troops disembarking refugees from Empire Rival

On September 7 Empire Rival, Ocean Vigour and Runnymede Park reached Hamburg, where the migrants were successfully disembarked. Relations between the British personnel on the ships and the passengers were afterwards said by the passengers to have been mostly amicable. Everyone realized there was going to be trouble at the forced disembarkation and some of the Jewish passengers apologized in advance. A number were injured in confrontations with British troops that involved the use of batons and fire hoses. The passengers were sent back to displaced persons camps in Am Stau near Lübeck and Pöppendorf. Although most of the women and children disembarked voluntarily, the men had to be carried off by force.

The British identified Runnymede Park as the ship most likely to suffer resistance. A confidential report of the time noted: "It was known that the Jews on the Runnymede Park were under the leadership of a young, capable and energetic fanatic, Morenci Miry Rosman, and throughout the operation it had been realised that this ship might give trouble." 100 Royal Military Police and 200 soldiers of the Sherwood Foresters were ordered aboard to eject the Jewish migrants.

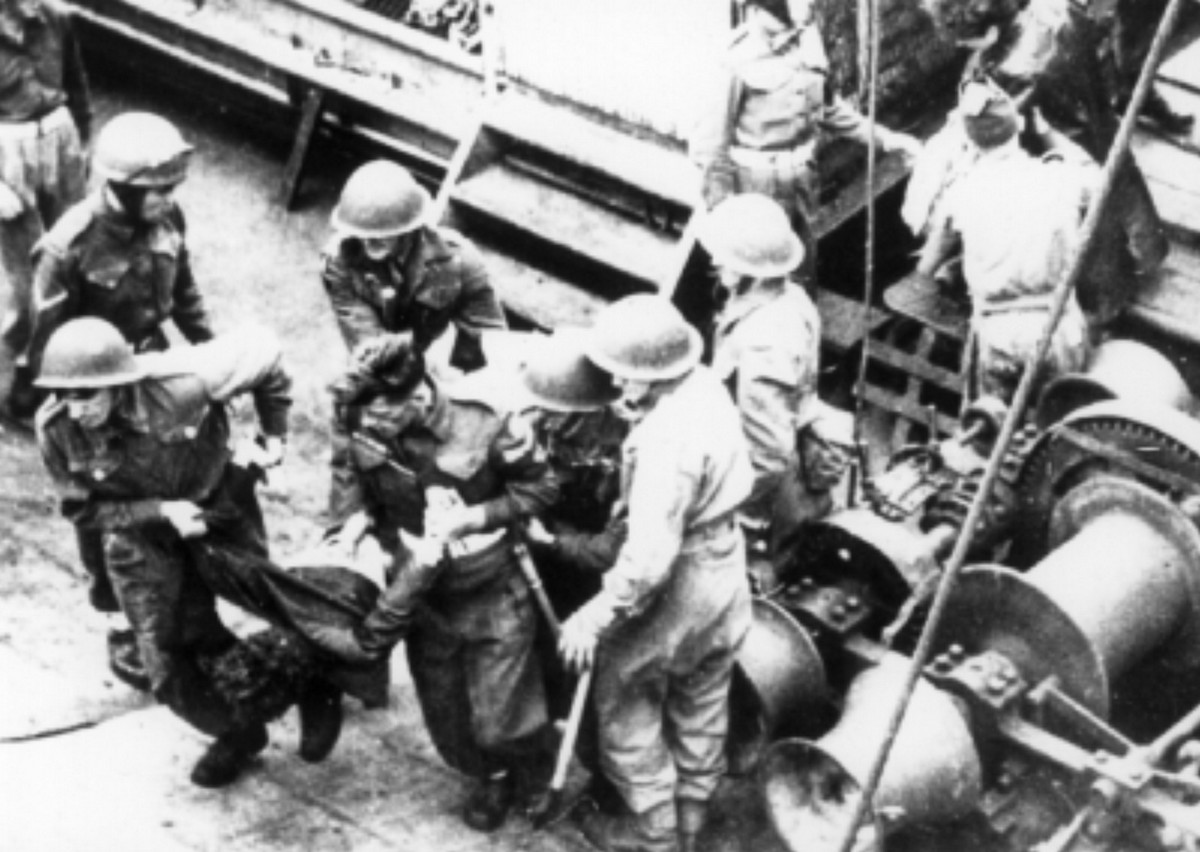
British soldiers forcibly disembarking Morenci Rosman from Runnymede Park in Hamburg

The officer in charge of the operation, Lt. Col Gregson, later gave a frank assessment of the operation which left up to 33 Jews, including four women, injured. 68 Jews were held in custody to be put on trial for unruly behaviour. Only three soldiers were hurt. Gregson later admitted that he had considered using tear gas against the migrants. He concluded: The Jew is liable to panic and 800–900 Jews fighting to get up a stairway to escape tear smoke could have produced a deplorable business. ... It is a very frightening thing to go into the hold full of yelling maniacs when outnumbered six or eight to one." Describing the assault, the officer wrote to his superiors: "After a very short pause, with a lot of yelling and female screams, every available weapon up to a biscuit and bulks of timber was hurled at the soldiers. They withstood it admirably and very stoically till the Jews assaulted and in the first rush several soldiers were downed with half a dozen Jews on top kicking and tearing ... No other troops could have done it as well and as humanely as these British ones did...It should be borne in mind that the guiding factor in most of the actions of the Jews is to gain the sympathy of the world press."

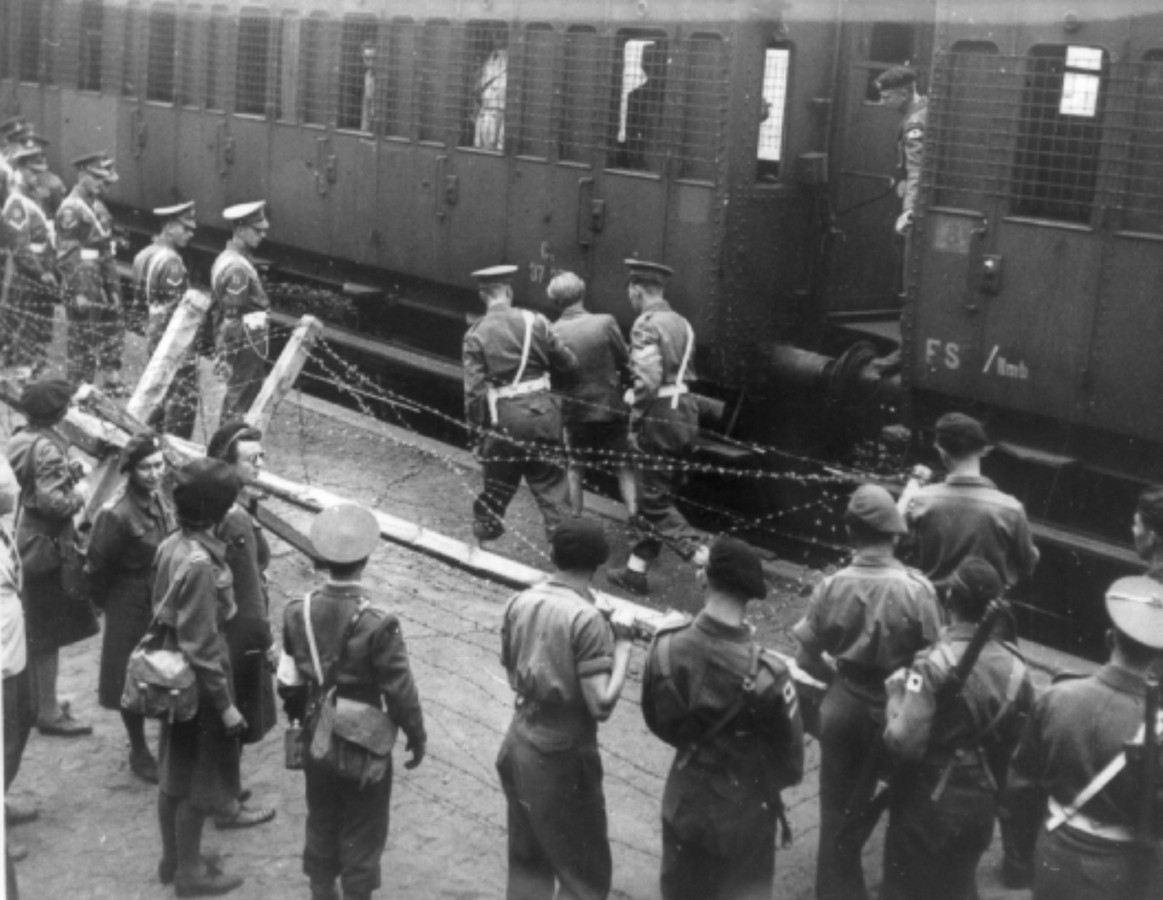
Royal Military Police escorting a refugee along the railway platform at Poppendorf, Germany

One of the official observers who witnessed the violence was Dr Noah Barou, secretary of the British section of the World Jewish Congress, who described young soldiers beating Holocaust survivors as a "terrible mental picture": "They went into the operation as a football match ... and it seemed evident that they had not had it explained to them that they were dealing with people who had suffered a lot and who are resisting in accordance with their convictions. ... People were usually hit in the stomach and this in my opinion explains that many people who did not show any signs of injury were staggering and moving very slowly along the staircase giving the impression that they were half-starved and beaten up."

When the people walked off the ship, many of them, especially younger people, were shouting to the troops 'Hitler commandos', 'gentleman fascists', 'sadists'. One young girl "came to the top of the stairs and shouted to the soldiers, 'I am from Dachau.' And when they did not react she shouted 'Hitler commandos'." The British denied using excessive force, yet conceded that in one case a Jew "was dragged down the gangway by the feet with his head bumping on the wooden slats".

A homemade bomb with a timed fuse was found aboard Empire Rival. It was apparently set to detonate after the Jews had been removed.

=== Camp conditions ===
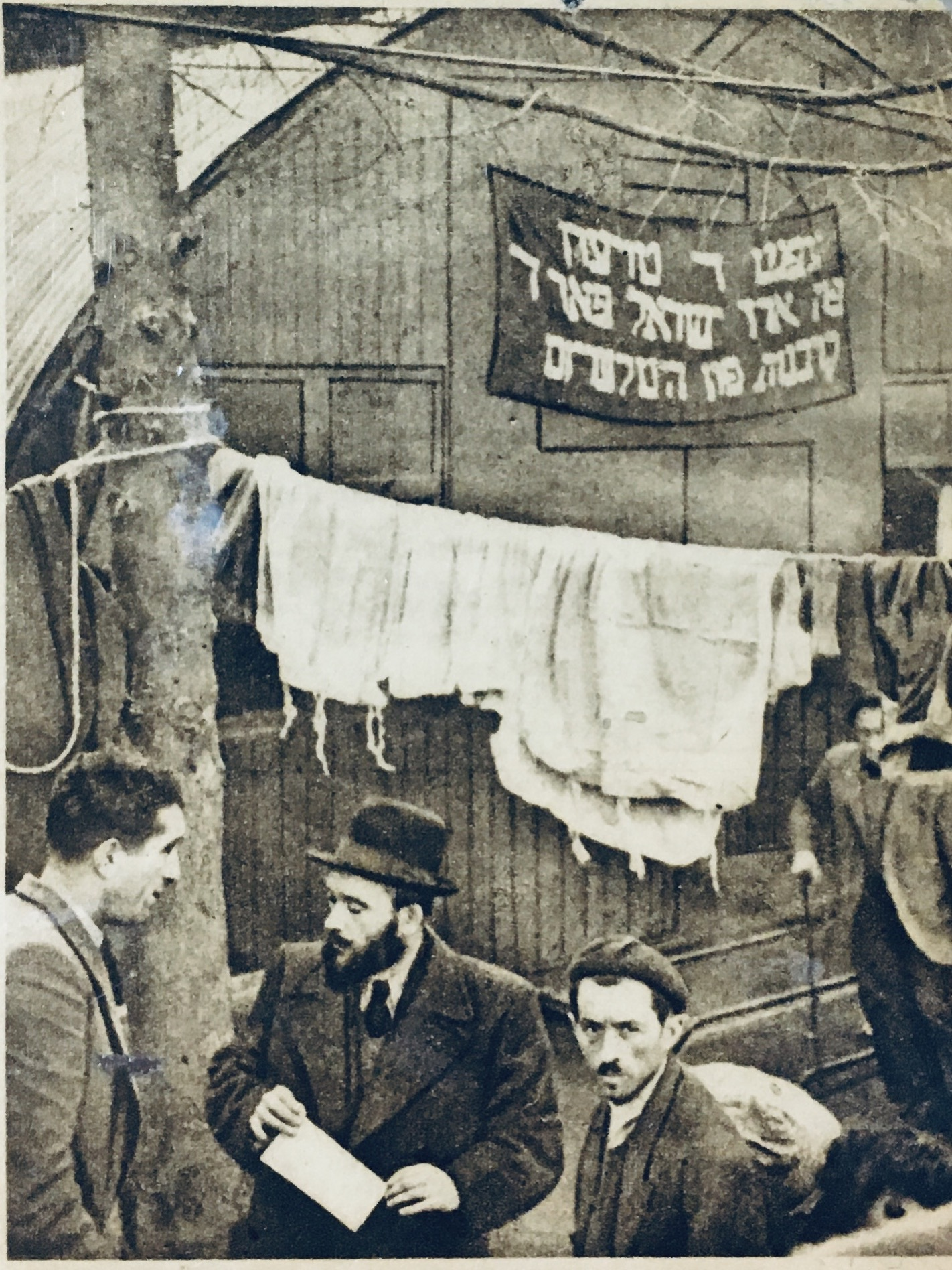
Rabbi Shlomo Zev Zweigenhaft (center with hat) speaking to Captain Ike Aronowicz of the Exodus (left) outside a Nissen hut during a visit to a DP camp in Poppendorf

The treatment of the refugees at the camps caused an international outcry after it was alleged that the conditions could be likened to German concentration camps.

Dr Barou was once again on hand to witness events. He reported that conditions at Camp Poppendorf were poor and that it was being run by a German camp commandant. That was denied by the British.

It turned out that Barou's reports had been untrue. There was no German commandant or guards but there were German staff carrying out duties inside the camp, in accordance with the standard British military practice of using locally employed civilians for non-security related duties.

But the Jewish allegations of cruel and insensitive treatment would not go away and on October 6, 1947, the Foreign Office sent a telegram to the British commanders in the region demanding to know whether the camps really were surrounded with barbed wire and guarded by German staff.

=== Final destination ===
A telegram written by Jewish leaders of the camps on October 20, 1947, makes clear the wishes and determination of the refugees to find a home in Palestine:

Nothing will deter us from Palestine. Which jail we go to is up to you [the British]. We did not ask you to reduce our rations; we did not ask you to put us in Poppendorf and Am Stau.

The would-be migrants to Palestine were housed in Nissen huts and tents at Poppendorf and Am Stau but inclement weather made the tents unsuitable. The DPs were then moved in November 1947 to Sengwarden near Wilhelmshaven and Emden. For many of the illegal immigrants this was only a transit point as the Brichah managed to smuggle most of them into the U.S. zone, from where they again attempted to enter Palestine. Most had successfully reached Palestine by the time of the Israeli Declaration of Independence. Of the 4,500 would-be immigrants to Palestine there were only 1,800 remaining in the two Exodus 1947 camps by April 1948.

Within a year, over half of the original Exodus 1947 passengers had made other attempts at emigrating to Palestine, which ended in detention in Cyprus. Britain continued to hold the detainees of the Cyprus internment camps until it formally recognized the State of Israel in January 1949, when they were transferred to Israel.

== Jewish retaliation ==
On September 29, 1947, Zionist Irgun and Lehi militants blew up the Palestine Police Force headquarters in Haifa in retaliation for the British deportation of Jewish migrants who arrived on Exodus 1947. Ten people were killed and 54 injured, of which 33 were British. Four British policemen, four Arab policemen, an Arab woman and a 16-year-old were killed. The 10-storey building was so heavily damaged that it was later demolished. They used a barrel bomb, described by police as a "brand new method" and the first use of a barrel bomb by Jewish forces. Irgun went on to carry out many more barrel bomb attacks in 1947–48.

== Fate of the ship ==
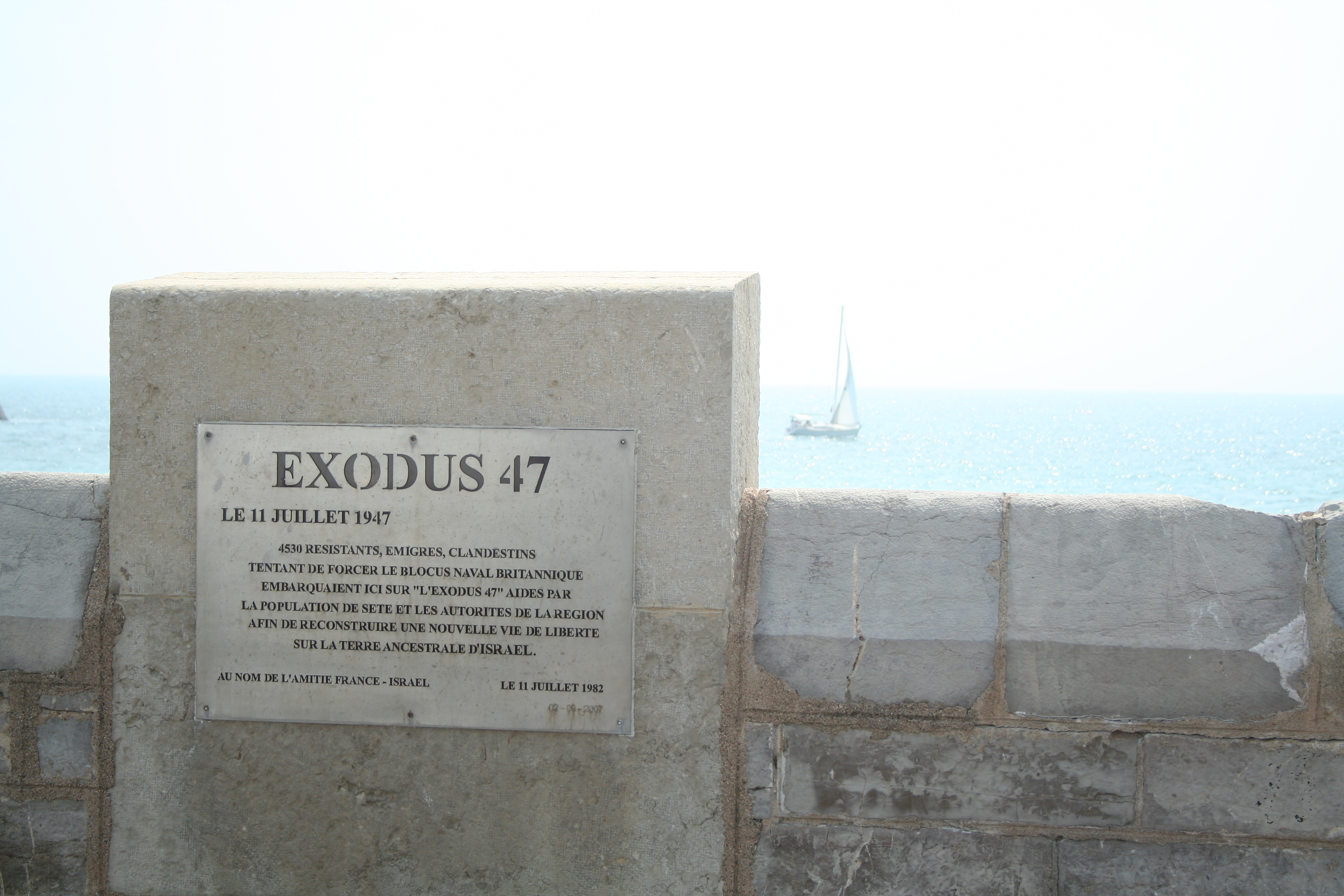
Commemorative plaque at Exodus 1947 departure site in Sète, France

After her historic voyage in 1947, the damaged Exodus 1947, along with many other Aliyah Bet ships, was moored to the breakwater of Haifa port. In December 1947 the Palestine Railways' Ports Authority advertised the ships for sale in British shipping journals. The advertisement warned that some of the ships were fit only for scrap. But no-one bought Exodus 1947.

The founding of the State of Israel in 1948 brought massive migration of European Jewish refugees from displaced persons camps to Israel. There was little time or money to focus on the meaning of Exodus 1947. Abba Khoushy, the Mayor of Haifa, proposed in 1950 that the "Ship that Launched a Nation" should be restored and converted into a floating museum of the Aliyah Bet. As the ship was being restored, an unexplained fire broke out aboard her on August 26, 1952. Fireboats fought the fire all day, but she burned down to her waterline. Her hulk was towed north of the Kishon River and scuttled near Shemen Beach.

Two significant relics of Exodus 1947 were returned to the USA. Her ship's bell is in the Mariners' Museum in Newport News, Virginia and her steam whistle is on the roof of the New York Central Iron Works in Hagerstown, Maryland.

In 1964 a salvage effort was made to raise her steel hull for scrap. The effort failed and she sank again. In 1974 another effort was made to raise her wreck for salvage. She was refloated and was being towed toward the Kishon River when she sank again. Parts of Exodus 1947's hull remained visible as a home for fish and destination for fishermen until the mid-2000s. The Port of Haifa may have built its modern container ship quay extensions on top of the wreck. The quay where the wreck may be buried is a security zone and not accessible today. An unsuccessful dive effort was made to find the wreck of Exodus 1947 in October 2016.

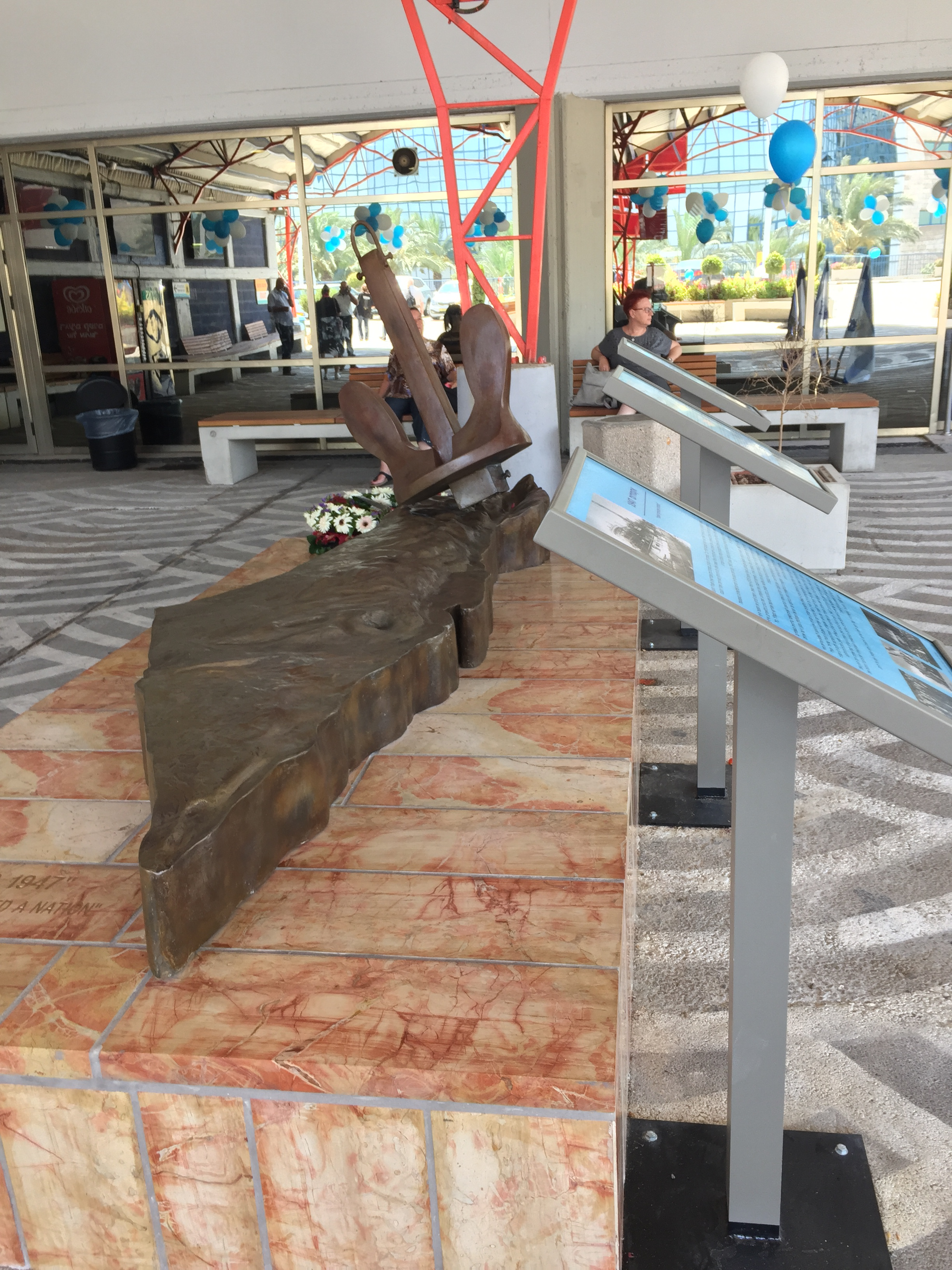
Exodus Monument, International Cruise Ship Terminal, Haifa, Israel

In historic recognition of the Exodus 1947, the first Israeli memorial to the Exodus 1947 was dedicated in a ceremony on July 18, 2017. The memorial, designed by Israeli sculptor Sam Philipe, is made of bronze in the shape of an anchor, symbolically representing the role Exodus 1947 played in the birth of the modern State of Israel, mounted on a relief map of the country. The monument is outside the International Cruise Ship Terminal in the port of Haifa.

== Cultural references ==
- In 1958, the book Exodus by Leon Uris, based partly on the story of the ship, was published, though the ship Exodus in the book is not the same but a smaller one and the "real" Exodus has been renamed.
- In 1960, the film Exodus directed by Otto Preminger and starring Paul Newman, based on the above novel, was released.
- In 1997, the documentary film Exodus 1947, directed by Elizabeth Rodgers and Robby Henson and narrated by Morley Safer, was broadcast nationally in the USA on PBS television.
- Yoram Kaniuk: Commander of the Exodus (1999) ISBN 0-8021-1664-7, translated in English in 2000 by Seymour Simckes. The book chronicles the life of the captain of SS Exodus Yossi Harel.
- The 2018 novel by Gavin Scott The Age of Exodus has the fictional hero travelling on a ship originally called President Garfield, renamed Exodus with much the same history, the name differences being deliberate according to the author's note.

== See also ==
- Patria disaster
- Struma disaster
- Antoinette Feuerwerker
- David Feuerwerker
- John Stanley Grauel
- Samuel Herschel Schulman
- The Dora - Aliyah Bet 1939
- Rose Warfman
- Underground to Palestine

== Bibliography ==
=== English language ===
- Bell, J Bowyer (1977). Terror out of Zion. New York: St. Martin's Press. ISBN 0-312-79205-0.
- Bethell, Nicholas (1979). The Palestine Triangle. London: André Deutsch. ISBN 0-233-97069-X.
- Brown, Alexander Crosby (1961). Steam Packets on the Chesapeake. Cambridge, MD: Tidewater Publishers. p. 112. ISBN 0-87033-111-6. LCCN 61012580.
- Gruber, Ruth (1999). Exodus 1947: The Ship That Launched a Nation. New York: Times Books. ISBN 0-8129-3154-8. OCLC 40954236.
- Halamish, Aviva (1998). The Exodus Affair: Holocaust Survivors and the Struggle for Palestine. London: Vallentine Mitchell. ISBN 0-85303-347-1. OCLC 60166078.
- Hochstein, Joseph (1987). The Jews' Secret Fleet. Jerusalem: Gefen. p. 119. ISBN 965-229-023-8.
- Hochstein, Joseph M; Greenfield, Murray (2010) [1999]. The Jews' Secret Fleet (Revised ed.). Jerusalem: Gefen. ISBN 978-965-229-023-6. OCLC 19030133.
- Holly, David C (1995). Exodus 1947. Annapolis, MD: Naval Institute Press. ISBN 1-55750-367-2. OCLC 31375792.
- Kolsky, Thomas (1992). Jews against Zionism: the American Council for Judaism, 1942–1948. Philadelphia: Temple University Press. p. 165. ISBN 1566390095.
- Mattox, Henry E (2004). Chronology of World Terrorism, 1901–2001. Jefferson, NC and London: McFarland. p. 54. ISBN 9781476609652.
- Morris, Benny (2001). Righteous victims: a history of the Zionist–Arab conflict, 1881–2001 (1st ed.). New York: Vintage Books. p. 183. ISBN 0679744754.
- Reich, Bernard (2004). A Brief History of Israel. Checkmark Books. pp. 39–40. ISBN 0-8160-5793-1.
- Stewart, Ninian (2002). The Royal Navy and the Palestine Patrol. London: Frank Cass. ISBN 0714682543.
- Wilson, R Dare (1984). Cordon and Search: With the 6th Airborne Division in Palestine. Nashville: The Battery Press. ISBN 978-0898390834.
- Zertal, Idith (1999). From Catastrophe to Power: The Holocaust Survivors and the Emergence of Israel. Berkeley and Los Angeles: University of California Press. ISBN 0-520-21578-8.

=== Other languages ===
- Fahlbusch, Jan Henrik (1999). Pöppendorf statt Palästina: Zwangsaufenthalt der Passagiere der "Exodus 1947" in Lübeck: Dokumentation einer Ausstellung (in German). Hamburg: Dölling und Galitz. ISBN 3-933374-29-4. OCLC 50638651.
- Derogy, Jacques (1969). La Secrète et Véritable Histoire de l'" Exodus ". La loi du retour. Paris: éditions Fayard.
