= John Stanley Grauel =

American minister and Zionist leader (1917–1986)

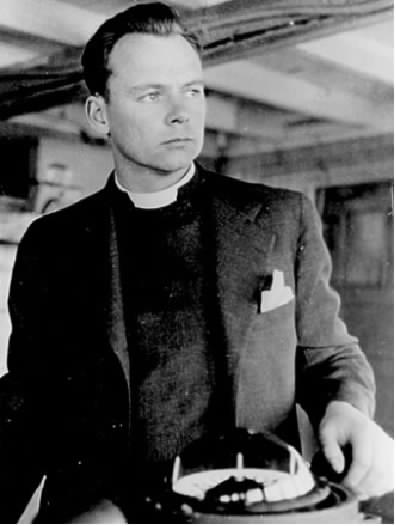
- Born: December 12, 1917; Worcester, Massachusetts
- Died: September 6, 1986 (aged 68); Roosevelt, New Jersey
- Known for: crew of Exodus and testimony to UNSCOP

John Stanley Grauel (December 12, 1917 – September 6, 1986, also nicknamed "John the Priest" after Prester John) was a Methodist minister and American Christian Zionist leader. He was a crew member of the Aliyah Bet ship Exodus 1947 and a secret Haganah operative. Grauel is sometimes credited with being the key individual who persuaded the United Nations Special Committee on Palestine to recommend for the Partition Resolution of November 1947, creating the State of Israel. In a speech to the Jewish Agency, Golda Meir, referred to his testimony as the first appeal by a "priest, a perfectly worthy gentile, a priori, no Jewish witness was to be believed."

== Early life and education ==
John Stanley Grauel was born in Worcester, Massachusetts, in 1917. His mother was deeply religious and impressed her son with her beliefs. The family became a migrant family during the Great Depression until settling in Virginia. Grauel studied at the Randolph–Macon College as a pre theological student. His father died from cancer in 1936 and Grauel supported the family doing various jobs. In 1941, he completed his education, graduating from the Theological Seminary, in Bangor, Maine, as a Methodist minister. During his final year he got married, but his wife and son died due to complications at childbirth.

== In Haganah and Exodus 1947 ==
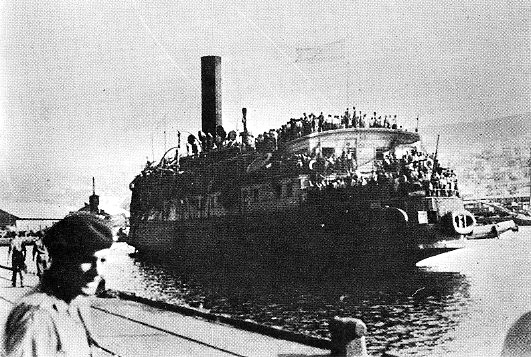
Exodus in the Port of Haifa

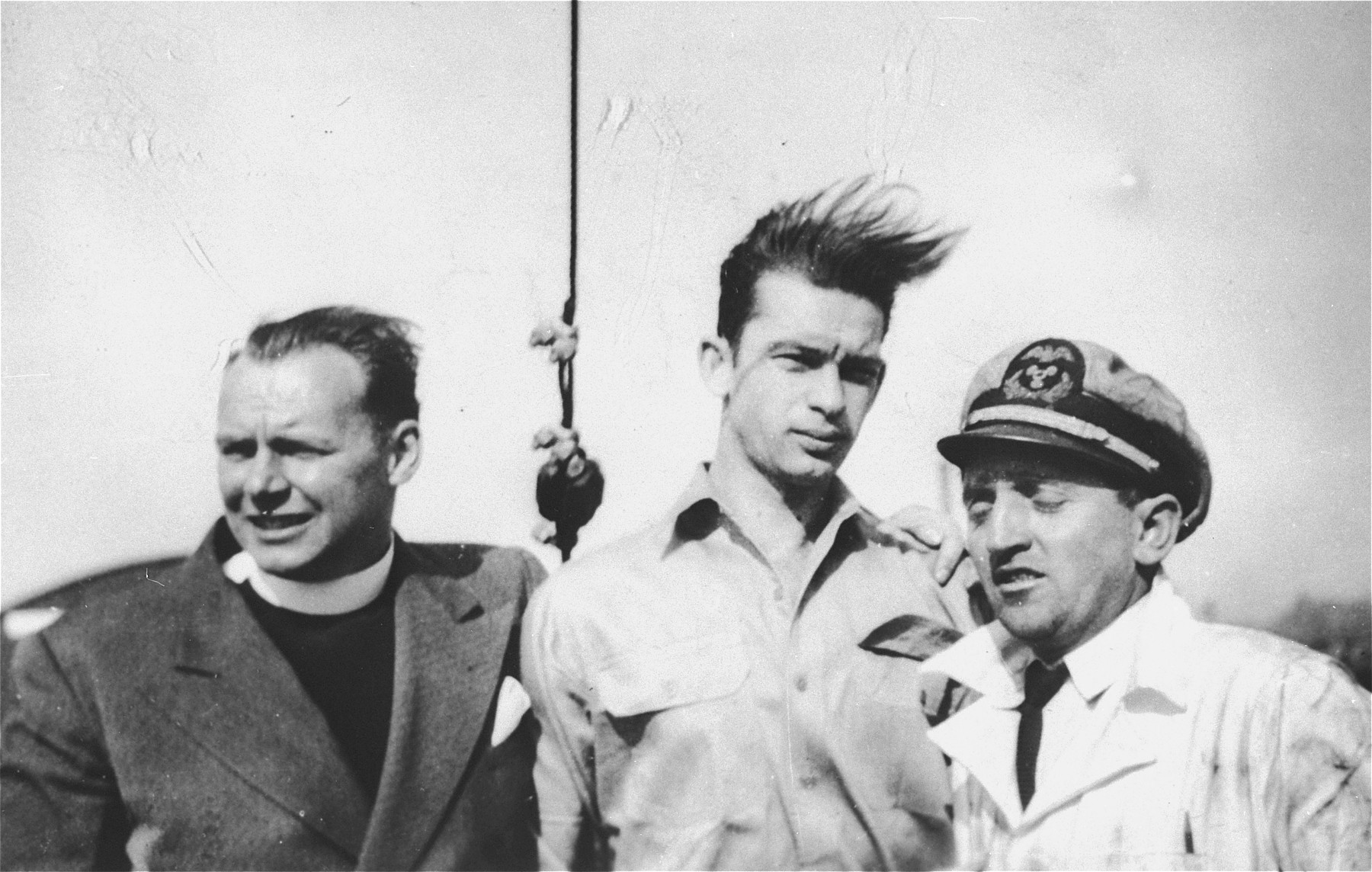
From left: John Stanley Grauel, Yaakov Oron (Garbash) and Aryeh Kolomeitzev, on the deck of President Warfield (later Exodus 1947) before its departure for Europe. (The engineer Kolomeitzev did not sail with the ship)

Grauel became very aware of the European Holocaust and the Zionist movement in 1942 through his close friendship with Judge Joseph Goldberg of Worcester. Also in 1942, he joined the American Palestine Committee, which was dedicated to the establishment of a Jewish state. In 1943 he gave up the local ministry to assume a position as a director of the committee's Philadelphia office. In 1944, attending his first Zionist meeting he met David Ben-Gurion, the Zionist leader and future prime minister of Israel. Grauel learned of the Haganah, the Jewish underground army in Palestine, and the longtime humanitarian efforts of Haganah to save Jewish lives from the Holocaust by smuggling Jews into Palestine. Reverend Grauel enlisted in the effort immediately, leading a double life working for the America Palestine Committee and the Jewish underground.

Grauel became part of the Mossad LeAliyah Bet and sailed aboard the illegal refugee ship Exodus 1947 on March 23, 1947. Haganah put him aboard as a secret operative, under the cover of a foreign correspondent for the Episcopal journal, The Churchman. Grauel's mission was to get the story of Exodus 1947 out to the World. In Europe he organized and transferred refugees from the displaced persons camps to the ship. Filling multiple roles, he acted as an administrative executive, quartermaster, cook, and a liaison for the crew and the refugees. Exodus 1947, heavily overburdened with 4,515 refugees, was intercepted and captured by Royal Navy destroyers off the coast of Haifa, Palestine, in a brief violent boarding that left two refugees and one crew member dead. Grauel was arrested by the British. He was put under house arrest at the Savoy Hotel. Learning that the hotel lobby was filled with journalists from around the world, he got in to tell them about Exodus 1947 and answer all their questions. With help from Haganah, he escaped before the police arrived.

=== Testimony to UNSCOP ===
After his escape, Haganah helped bring Grauel to meet Jorge García Granados, a member of the United Nations Special Committee on Palestine and give firsthand testimony, emphatically declaring that there were no weapons aboard Exodus 1947 during the violent boarding. He was brought later to give a direct testimony before the United Nations Special Committee on Palestine. His firsthand testimony was extremely effective in eliciting sympathy and understanding for the cause of unrestricted Jewish refugee immigration to Palestine.

Golda Meir, a later Prime Minister of Israel, observed that Reverend Grauel's testimony and advocacy for the creation of the Jewish State fundamentally and positively changed the United Nations to support the creation of Israel. Grauel said that his testimony before the United Nations Special Committee on Palestine was given more credence because he was a Christian, rather than a Jewish crew member.

== Later humanitarian efforts ==
Throughout his life he maintained close associations with Jewish concerns. In the 1950s and 1960s he led investigations into the terrible conditions of Jews living in Morocco and Algeria. In 1975 he led one of the first Jewish youth tours of the Nazi concentration camps in Europe. Reverend Grauel was drawn to numerous humanitarian efforts including the American Civil Rights and Native American struggles.

The State of Israel recognized Rev. Grauel through the Humanity Medal, the Fighter for Israel Medal, and the Medal of Jerusalem.

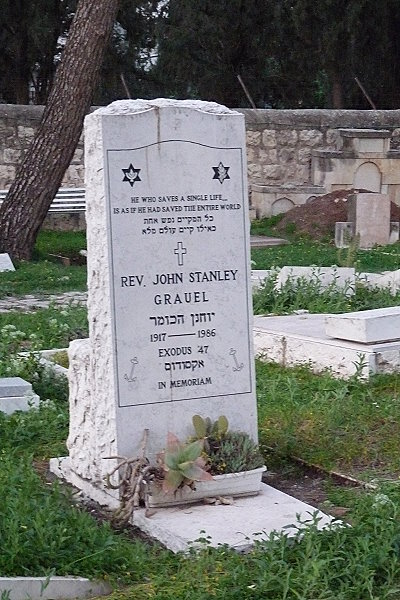
Grauel's gravestone in the Alliance Christian Missionary Cemetery, German Colony, Jerusalem, Israel

He died at his home in Roosevelt, New Jersey, on September 6, 1986 and was buried in the Alliance Church International Cemetery at the Cemetery at the German Colony, Jerusalem, Israel, at services attended by an Israeli Naval Honor Guard, B'nai B'rith, members of Aliyah Bet and fellow crew members of Exodus 1947.
