= Yossi Harel =

Israeli intelligence officer (1918–2008)

Yosef Harel
- יוסף הראל
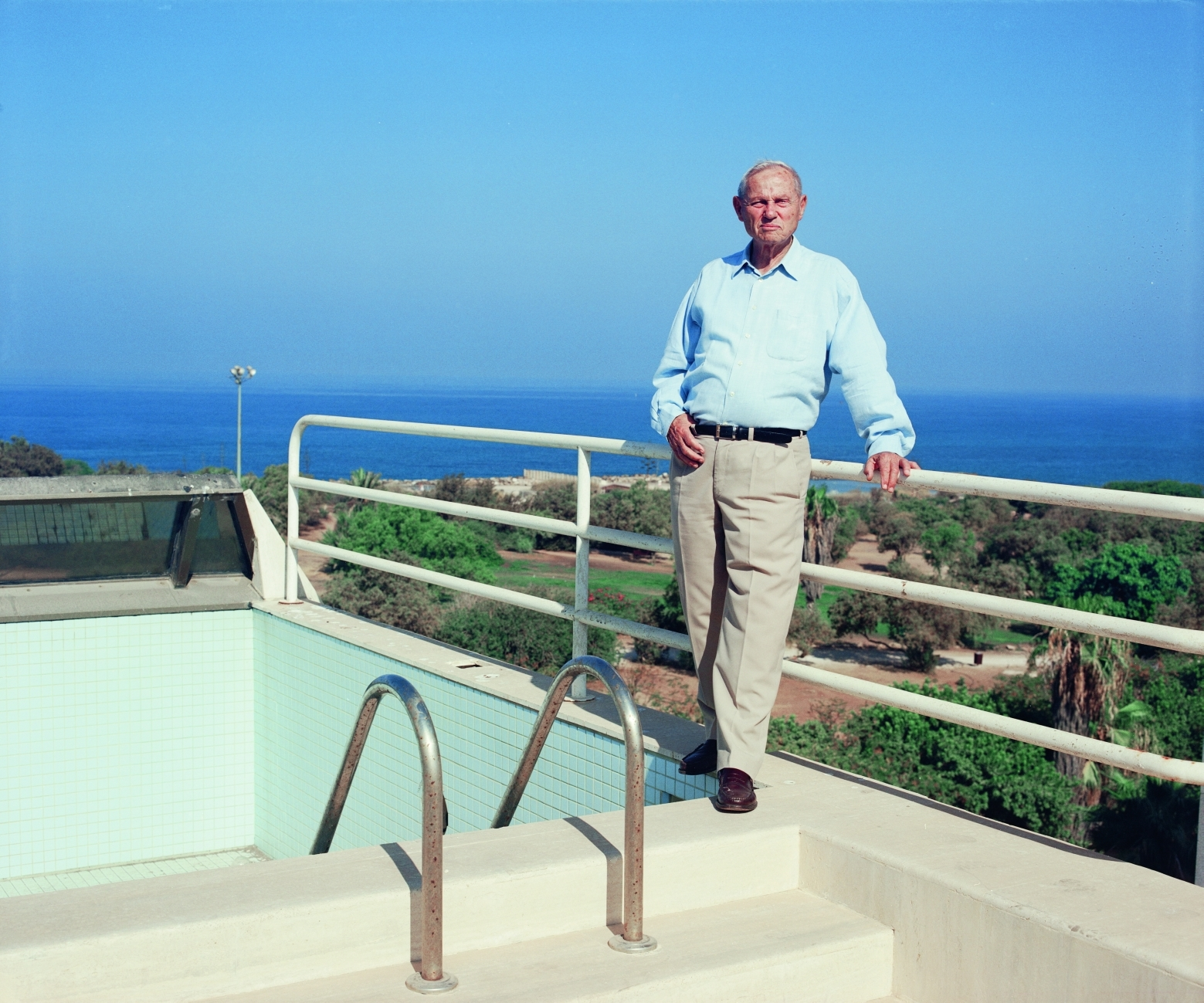
- Harel in c. 2004
- Born: Yosef Hamburger; January 4, 1918; Jerusalem, Mandatory Palestine
- Died: April 26, 2008 (aged 90); Tel Aviv, Israel
- Resting place: Kibbutz Sdot Yam, near Caesarea
- Education: MIT
- Occupation: Intelligence officer
- Known for: Commander of the Exodus 1947
- Spouse(s): Esther Vaisch (first wife), Julie Berez (second wife)
- Children: 3
- Awards: Exodus Prize (2007)

Yosef "Yossi" Harel (Hebrew: יוסף "יוסי" הראל; January 4, 1918 – April 26, 2008) was the commander of the Exodus 1947 operation and a leading member of the Israeli intelligence community.

== Biography ==
Yosef Hamburger (later Harel) and his twin brother Natan were born in Jerusalem to Moshe and Batya Hamburger. He was a sixth generation Jerusalemite. He attended Tachkemoni School and as a teenager, worked in a quarry and laid telegraph cables for the post office. At the age of 15, he joined the Haganah.

Harel's first marriage was to Esther Vaisch and they had one daughter, Nurit. In 1951 he married Julie Berez with whom he had two children, Sharon and David. His daughter, Sharon Harel, is the third wife of Sir Ronald Cohen.

Harel died of a heart attack in Tel Aviv on April 26, 2008, at the age of 90. He is buried at Kibbutz Sdot Yam, near Cesarea.

== Military and intelligence career ==
During the 1936–1939 Arab revolt in Palestine, Harel fought in the Special Night Squads under Orde Wingate. He joined the British Army after the outbreak of World War II and was sent to Greece in 1941 as part of the Allied expeditionary force to fight the Axis invasion of Greece. He was severely wounded during fighting in Greece and left deaf in one ear, and subsequently discharged. Between 1945 and 1948, he played a leading role in the clandestine immigration enterprise in Palestine, commanding four Aliyah Bet ships: Knesset Israel, the Exodus 1947, Atzma'ut and Kibbutz Galuyot. After the establishment of the State of Israel, Harel served as a liaison officer to IDF Chief of Staff Yaakov Dori during the 1948 Arab-Israeli War, helping coordinate military operations. He then studied mechanical engineering at MIT in the United States. Just before he finished his studies, Moshe Dayan, as Chief of Staff, called him back to Israel to investigate the Lavon Affair, in which an Israeli spy and sabotage ring was uncovered in Egypt. He recommended the Prime Minister, David Ben-Gurion, to dismiss the people responsible for the fiasco. Ben-Gurion assigned him to rebuild military intelligence from the ground up and made him head of Unit 131, an Israel Defense Forces intelligence unit.

== Legacy and commemoration ==
Harel is the subject of a biography in Hebrew by Yoram Kaniuk, Exodus: The Odyssey of a Commander (1999; English title: Commander of the Exodus, ISBN 0-8021-1664-7), which has been translated into many languages. He rose to fame after the release of the 1960 Otto Preminger film Exodus, which was based on the 1958 Leon Uris novel of the same name. His character in the novel, Ari Ben Canaan, was portrayed by Paul Newman.

In 2007 the government of Italy awarded the Exodus prize to Harel. The prize is given annually to individuals who promote peace and humanitarianism at La Spezia in Italy, where the ship Exodus 1947 was renovated.
