= Exodus (Uris novel) =

1958 novel by Leon Uris

- First edition
- Author: Leon Uris
- Language: English
- Genre: Historical fiction
- Publisher: Doubleday
- Publication date: 1958
- Publication place: United States
- Media type: Print (hardcover and paperback)
- Pages: 608 pages
- ISBN: 0385050828

Exodus is a historical novel by the American novelist Leon Uris about the founding of the State of Israel beginning with a compressed retelling of the voyages of the 1947 immigration ship Exodus. It explores events through the histories of the various main characters and the ties of their personal lives to the birth of the new Jewish state.

Published by Doubleday in 1958, it became an international publishing phenomenon, the biggest bestseller in the United States since Gone with the Wind (1936). It was still number one on The New York Times Best Seller list eight months after its release.

Otto Preminger directed a 1960 film based on the novel, featuring Paul Newman as Ari Ben Canaan. It focuses mainly on the ship's and immigrants' escape from Cyprus and subsequent events in Palestine.

== The origins of Exodus ==
Uris covered the Suez Crisis as a war correspondent in 1956. Two accounts are credited for telling about how he came to write the novel. The first suggests Uris, motivated by an intense interest in Israel, financed his own research for the novel by selling the film rights in advance to MGM and writing articles about the Sinai campaign. It has also been reported that Uris undertook two years of research, and extensive travel - including 12,000 miles within Israel, in addition to conducting 1,200 interviews as a basis for his novel.

Uris would say of his thinking:

There is a whole school of American Jewish writers who spend their time damning their fathers, hating their mothers, wringing their hands and wondering why they were born. This isn't art or literature. It's psychiatry. These writers are professional apologists. Every year you find one of their works on the best-seller list. Their work is obnoxious and makes me sick to my stomach. I wrote Exodus because I was just sick of apologizing—or feeling that it was necessary to apologize.

Others claim Uris was approached by a public relations firm in the mid-1950s with the idea of a writing a propaganda novel on behalf of Israel.

Whatever the genesis of the work, it generated a new sympathy in the United States and some other nations for the newly established State of Israel. The book has been widely praised as successful propaganda for Israel. Uris acknowledged after the book was published that he wrote it from a pro-Israel perspective, stating that: "I set out to tell a story of Israel. I am definitely biased. I am definitely pro-Jewish." Then–Prime Minister of Israel, David Ben-Gurion remarked that: "As a literary work, it isn't much. But as a piece of propaganda, it's the greatest thing ever written about Israel".

The book also contributed greatly to general knowledge of the Holocaust for Jews and non-Jews alike. The general public learned more about the plight of the European Jews widely affected by Nazi Germany conquests.

== Plot ==
In 1946, American foreign correspondent Mark Parker and American nurse Kitty Fremont reunite as old friends. Kitty is an American volunteer at the Karaolos internment camp on Cyprus, where thousands of Jews—Holocaust survivors—are being held by the British, who refused to allow them to go to Palestine. Separately, another pair of friends, Jewish fighters Ari Ben Canaan and David Ben Ami, also reunite.

Ari obtains a cargo ship, which was renamed as SS Exodus, with the intention to smuggle 302 Jewish children from the camp for an illegal voyage to Mandate Palestine before being discovered by military authorities. When the British learn the refugees are aboard a ship in Famagusta harbor, they blockade it, preventing the ship's departure. The refugees stage a hunger strike, during which the camp's doctor dies. Ari has wired the ship with explosives and threatens to blow up the ship and the refugees if the British try to board. When the British attempt to gain time by negotiating, Ari announces that every day 10 children will commit suicide on deck for the world to see. The British relent and allow the Exodus safe passage.

A generation previously, Ari's father Jossi and uncle Yakov migrated to Palestine following the Pogroms in the Russian Empire. They were disappointed that the regional Jews do not farm, and they take money from overseas philanthropists. The brothers change their names to Akiva (Yakov) and Barak (Jossi). Jossi tries to understand the Palestinians, and uses demonstrations of force to gain their respect. The Balfour Declaration was issued during World War I. The two brothers become senior in the Jewish community government, and debate using terrorism to fight the British authorities.

The United Nations Partition Plan for Palestine is approved, and the conflict with the Palestinians begins in earnest. The Haganah forces prevail over three Arab generals who vie for fame. They adopt siege warfare tactics. The Jewish victory at Safed, incorrectly rumored as using an atom bomb, frightens the Arab Palestinian fighters, who flee to Lebanon. Israel proclaims its independence and gradually defeats the Arab nations to survive.

== Themes ==
The main plot of the novel, writes Bonnie Helms, who included it in her "150 Great Books" (1986), involves a "story of great courage." Among the characters are "freedom fighters" Ari and Barak Ben Canaan and Dov Landau, whose stories are told in flashbacks. American nurse Kitty Fremont and German refugee Karen Hansen work alongside them to help overcome British immigration restrictions. The novel includes several love stories, although they often occur among violence and terrorism. "Uris gives the reader a strong sense of the past, present, and the future of the Jewish people," states Helms.

The characters in Exodus were inspired to seek their meaning and identity in relation to their social settings. Their personal experiences had been founded both in religion and geography. According to William Darby, "The leading characters in Exodus only find romantic happiness when they understand that they must conjoin nationalistic, religious and personal aims."

Years after the book's success, Uris explained why he thinks it received such an enthusiastic reception:

Exodus is the story of the greatest miracle of our times, an event unparalleled in the history of mankind: the rebirth of a nation which had been dispersed 2,000 years before. It tells the story of the Jews coming back after centuries of abuse, indignities, torture, and murder to carve an oasis in the sand with guts and with blood....Exodus is about fighting people, people who do not apologize either for being born Jews or the right to live in human dignity.

The novel blames the 1948 Palestinian expulsion and flight on the Palestinians, leading some scholars to label the text a work of Nakba denial.

== Characters ==
=== Ari Ben Canaan ===
Ari Ben Canaan, a sabra born and raised on a kibbutz, goes on to become one of the mainstays of the Israeli freedom movement. The handsome Ben Canaan is described as six feet and three inches tall, with dark hair and ice-blue eyes. His father, Barak Ben Canaan (formerly Jossi Rabinsky, born in the Russian Pale of Settlement), heads the Jewish Agency for Palestine. His uncle Akiva (formerly Yakov Rabinsky) leads the Maccabees, a militant organization (based on the Irgun). The brothers came to Palestine after their father was murdered in a pogrom.

As a young man, Ari was in love with a young woman, Dafna, who was tortured, raped, and murdered by Arabs. Dafna later becomes the namesake of the youth village, Gan Dafna, around which a large part of the story unfolds. As part of the Mossad Aliyah Bet (an organization which organized Jewish immigration to Palestine), Ari is extremely creative in devising techniques to bring Jews from all over the world to Palestine – more than allowed by the British quota. During World War II, he served as an officer in the Jewish Brigade of the British army, and he uses this experience to benefit his activities. This is his main occupation until Israel gains freedom, when he joins the Israeli army and is assigned to the Negev desert. He sees himself as part of a new breed of Jew who will not "turn the other cheek". There are similarities to his character and Moshe Dayan, the Israeli military leader and politician; many parallels can be drawn between Ari and Dayan: both the fictional Ari and the real-life Dayan were trained by the same British General and had similar World War II experiences. Ben Canaan is also reported, however, to be based upon Yehudah Arazi. His character most likely was based on Yossi Harel, the commander of the Exodus 1947 operation and a leading member of the Israeli intelligence community.

=== Katherine "Kitty" Fremont ===
Katherine "Kitty" Fremont is described in the novel as being tall, blonde, blue-eyed, and beautiful. An American nurse newly widowed, Kitty meets Ari Ben Canaan in Cyprus. Grieving for her lost husband and the recent death of her daughter from polio, Kitty develops a maternal attachment toward Karen Hansen Clement, a German refugee in a Cyprus displaced persons (DP) camp. This attachment and her attraction toward Ben Canaan result in her becoming, initially with reluctance, involved in the freedom struggle. She eventually becomes irritated at Ari's lack of emotion towards violent deaths, but comes to understand and accept his dedication to Israel.

=== Mark Parker ===
Mark Parker is an American journalist and Kitty Fremont's friend. He is credited as the whistleblower of the Exodus after it left on its voyage to Palestine, as a blackmail against the British.

=== Bruce Sutherland ===
Bruce Sutherland is a British military officer (rank of brigadier) whose mother was Jewish. After a lifetime of soldiering, he is posted to Cyprus, with instructions to maintain security at the detention camps. Like many British aristocrats he has a stifling, formal manner of speech. Internally, he is torn between his sympathies with the Jews he is required to guard and his duties as a British officer; the horrors he witnessed when his battalion liberated Bergen-Belsen is also a factor. He retires from the army at his own request after a mass escape engineered and led by Ari Ben Canaan. Despite this, he moves to Palestine to settle, becomes good friends with Ben Canaan, and acts as a very unofficial military advisor.

=== Karen Hansen Clement ===
Karen Hansen Clement, described as tall, with long brown hair and green eyes, is a German teenager who was brought up for a while by foster parents in Denmark. She was sent there by her family when Hitler rose to power in Germany. Her family was subsequently interned in concentration camps, where her mother and two younger brothers die. Before she is transported to Israel, Karen is placed in a Cypriot refugee camp and is one of the passengers on the Exodus. Karen does meet her father again in Israel, but he is a broken man who is unable to communicate or recognize his daughter; the experience leaves her unnerved and shattered. Despite this, she maintains her gentle and dainty personality. At the end of the novel she is murdered by fedayeen from Gaza.

=== Dov Landau ===
Dov Landau, described as being blond, blue-eyed, small, and young-looking for his age, is an angry teenager who lost his entire family to the Holocaust; he has not merely survived the horrors of the Warsaw Ghetto Uprising and of Auschwitz, but has learned from them to turn circumstances to his advantage. A master forger, he narrowly escapes the gas chamber by displaying his talent to the camp doctor. The doctor is not able to tell the difference between his own signature and the five copies that Dov makes. Dov works as a forger but is then assigned to work in a Sonderkommando, which he barely survives. After the camp is liberated, he ends up in Cyprus and eventually Israel as part of the escape organized by Ari Ben Canaan. He joins the Maccabees (based on the Irgun), a Jewish militant organization that is headed by Barak's brother Akiva. He is driven by a thirst for revenge "that only God or a bullet can stop". He falls in love with Karen and later becomes a Major in the Israeli army. He becomes unofficially engaged to Karen, but after she is murdered by the fedayeen, he forces himself to go on working for Israel, to make her proud of him.

=== Jordana Ben Canaan ===
Jordana Ben Canaan, described as tall, red-haired, and blue-eyed, is Ari's fiery younger sister, a leader of the Palmach (Haganah elite unit), and the lover and fiancée of David Ben Ami. Jordana is typical of the young native-born girls and, initially hostile toward Kitty—believing that American women are no good for anything other than dressing up prettily—changes her opinion when Kitty saves Ari's life and later becomes more identified with Israel's struggle. After the death of David Ben Ami, Jordana sinks into depression but never mentions his name.

=== Barak Ben Canaan ===
Barak Ben Canaan (born Jossi Rabinsky) is 6 feet, 3 inches tall, red-haired, and blue-eyed and the father of Ari Ben Canaan. He was born in the Russian Pale of Settlement. After their father was murdered in a pogrom, he and his brother Yakov walked overland to Palestine, where they settled. There, he met and married his wife Sarah, and his son Ari and daughter Jordana were born. He became a kibbutz pioneer and eventually head of the Jewish Agency. After his brother Yakov/Akiva joins the Maccabees, he cuts off all contact with Akiva. Near the end of the novel, Barak dies of cancer and is buried next to Akiva.

=== Akiva ===
Akiva (born Yakov Rabinsky), is of medium height, brown-eyed, and dark haired. He is Barak Ben Canaan's brother, a poet, and leader of the radical underground group the "Maccabees". While Akiva's organization bears some resemblance to the real-life Irgun (Etze"l), the character himself may be inspired by Avraham Stern of Lehi. Near the end of the book, he is shot by the British during the Acre prison break; his brother Barak is later buried next to him.

=== David Ben Ami ===
David Ben Ami is black-haired and brown-eyed, and a close colleague of Ari Ben Canaan, both in the Haganah and later in the IDF. He is also Jordana's lover and a friend of Kitty Freemont's. He was born in Jerusalem, is university educated, and plans to take a doctorate. Steeped in religious and mystical lore, he is also a specialist in Biblical archaeology and warfare. In this regard, his knowledge is valuable in the relief of besieged Jerusalem. He is killed in action after leading a suicide mission to capture the Old City of Jerusalem.

=== Rebecca Landau/Zev Gilboa ===
Two Jewish suicide bombers who sacrifice themselves in acts of final desperation to kill their adversaries. Landau's targets are German soldiers during the Warsaw Ghetto uprising during World War II; Gilboa's are Arab fighters at the siege of Fort Esther during the 1948 Arab–Israeli War.

== Reviews and critical commentary ==
The book became an international bestseller upon its release in 1958, and the biggest bestseller in the United States since Gone with the Wind in 1936. It remained number one on the New York Times bestseller list for nineteen weeks. By the time it came out in paperback in 1965, the hardback had already sold more than five million copies and was in the top 10 of The New York Times Best Seller list. The success of the book generated sympathy for the newly established State of Israel.

Various reasons were cited by reviewers as to why Exodus was so well received. Among them was the fact that the book, a historical novel, came out ten years after the widely publicized Exodus Affair, which involved a ship named SS Exodus, from which the book took its title. In 1947 the British Royal Navy seized the ship as it was about to cross into the territorial waters of Palestine and deported all its passengers – Jewish refugees trying to immigrate illegally, many of them Holocaust survivors – back to Europe. When it came out, Uris's book aroused the public's interest in the fate of that ship and its passengers.

Others credited the book for being an "antidote to the public silence of American Jews" after Israel became a state ten years earlier. "Something fundamental changed among American Jews as a result of the book," writes historian Matthew Silver. Jews were now able to reconnect to a "resurrected" Jewish homeland after two thousand years, he said.

The appeal of Exodus impacted Jews as well as non-Jews. Liberal Jews, writes anthropologist Jonathan Boyarin, used the Exodus narrative to connect their sympathy for the new state of Israel with their sympathy for the civil rights struggle of American blacks. Black author Julius Lester recalled that after reading the book its effect was "so extraordinary that I wanted to go and fight for Israel, even die, if need be, for Israel." He explained:

Israel spoke to the need I had as a young black man for a place where I could be free of being an object of hatred. I did not wish I were Jewish, but was glad that Jews had a land of their own, even if blacks didn't.

The book also affected the political relationship of certain countries to their Jewish populations, most of whom died during the Holocaust. Exodus describes in detail the plight of Jews living in Eastern European countries, such as Poland. Poland had dozens of concentration camps while it was occupied by the Nazis. Its government saw Uris's book as thereby "anti-Polish", and defaming the country's honor. The government subsequently began removing printed references to Polish informers and the country's indifference to the fate of Jews, while describing accounts of Polish aid to Jews during those years.

The Jewish population in the Soviet Union was greatly inspired by Exodus. Those involved in the dissident samizdat movement had to make secret copies of the book after it was painstakingly translated. Translator Leah Pliner notes that some of the story had to be cut out, including romances between Jewish and non-Jewish characters, not to offend Jewish readers' expectations. She recalls having to make 300 copies on a mimeograph machine, and by the time tens of thousands had been distributed, the samizdat version of Exodus became a source of inspiration. "The enormous significance of Exodus to the growth and stimulation of the Jewish movement," writes historian Leonard Schroeter, "can hardly be overstated."

Historian Aviva Halamish notes that the book describes the emigration of Jews to Palestine with a "heartrending story of genuine, unassuming heroism." Eileen Battersby of the Irish Times said the story "cast an emotive, bombastic spell" on readers, while journalist Quentin Reynolds said Exodus was exciting both "as a novel and as a historical document."

Alan Elsner of the Jewish Journal describes his own re-reading of the book as "disturbing and unsettling in many ways." He notes that parts of the novel were unfaithful to the actual events. For instance, while the novel describes children going on a hunger strike, which successfully forced the British to let the ship land in Palestine, in reality the British deported the Jewish passengers back to Germany. But although this did become an international incident by the press, which Elsner says discredited British policy, it "did not fit Uris' dramatic purpose." Despite such inaccuracies, he adds, "Exodus still packs an emotional wallop." The novel also perpetuates such historical myths as King Christian X donning a yellow star in solidarity with the Jews of Denmark.

Eric Homberger of The Guardian, describing Uris as a "master storyteller" and "educator of the American public in the Zionist interpretation of modern Jewish history," noted some literary license with historical facts and some stereotypical characters. Writer Saul Bellow admits that while some reviewers feel that the book was not of high literary caliber, it was nonetheless effective as a document: "We need such documents now," he said.

The book was first criticized in 1960 by Aziz S. Sahwell of the Arab Information Center for historical inaccuracies and its depiction of Arabs. This criticism has been maintained by others. Edward Said said in 2001 that the novel still provides "the main narrative model that dominates American thinking" with respect to the foundation of Israel. British writer Robert Fisk wrote in 2014 that it was "a racist, fictional account of the birth of Israel in which Arabs are rarely mentioned without the adjectives 'dirty' and 'stinking' [and] was one of the best pieces of Socialist-Zionist propaganda that Israel could have sought". Norman Finkelstein espoused a similar view as Robert Fisk, in his 2008 work Beyond Chutzpah. In addition, Rashid Khalidi has stated that the book has served "to confirm and deepen preexisting prejudices" about Palestinians and Arabs in general.

== See also ==
- "Babylon" (Mad Men): Don Draper reads the book throughout, and others mention its upcoming film release and bestseller status.
- Wladislaw Dering sued Leon Uris for libel because of allegations made against Dering in the novel. This lawsuit inspired the fictionalized account of a lawsuit that formed the basis of Uris' later bestselling novel, QB VII (1970).
- Bay Area thrash metal band Exodus named themselves after the novel.
