= Exodus (soundtrack) =

Soundtrack album by Ernest Gold
- Released: 1961
- Label: RCA Victor

Exodus is a soundtrack album by Ernest Gold with the Sinfonia of London from the 1960 film Exodus directed by Otto Preminger.

The main theme from the film ("Theme of Exodus") has been widely remixed and covered by many artists. The most popular version was an instrumental by Ferrante and Teicher, which reached number two on the Billboard Hot 100 in 1960. It was kept of out the number one spot by "Wonderland by Night" by Bert Kaempfert. This version became a gold record.

== Cover versions and sampling ==
Versions of "Theme of Exodus" were recorded by Andy Williams, Eddie Harris, Edith Piaf, Mantovani, Peter Nero, Connie Francis, Tova Porat, the 1960s British instrumental band The Eagles, and The Duprees, who sang the theme with lyrics written by Pat Boone.

Hard rock guitarist Leslie West performed the song with his earliest band The Vagrants and also in subsequent bands.

The band The Skatalites recorded a ska-version of the theme, which was covered by Bad Manners on the 1982 album Forging Ahead.

Pianist George Greeley recorded a 10 1/2 minute concert version on his 1961 Warner Bros. album Popular Piano Concertos of Famous Film Themes.

Other artists included piano player Anthony Burger for the Homecoming titled "I Do Believe", a disco version titled "Exo-Disco" by Huey Lewis & the American Express, a remix by techno-crossover pianist Maksim Mrvica, and it has even been used as the sample for the T.I. song "Bankhead".

The original version was used as a theme song for professional wrestler Mr. Perfect, and later a takeoff of the original version would become his longtime theme song.

Trey Spruance of the Secret Chiefs 3 rescored the theme for "surf band and orchestra" on the album 2004 Book of Horizons. The Chopsticks (a Hong Kong female duo, made up of Sandra Lang (仙杜拉) and Amina (亞美娜)), covered this as a medley song with "Hava Nagila" on their 1971 album All of a Sudden. The artist Nina Paley used the entire theme song to satirical effect in her animated short, titled after the lyrics, "This Land is Mine" in 2012, which was worked into her 2018 film Seder-Masochism. Furthermore, Howard Stern tends to use it for comedic effect when discussing aspects of Jewish life.

American electronic musician Moby sampled, reversed, and looped a 4-bar string section from the track "Fight For Survival" on his 2000 song “Porcelain”.

== Track listing ==
Side 1

1. "Theme of Exodus"
2. "Summer in Cyprus"
3. "Escape"
4. "Ari"
5. "Karen"
6. "Valley of Jezreel"
7. "Fight For Survival"

Side 2

1. "In Jerusalem"
2. "The Brothers"
3. "Conspiracy"
4. "Prison Break"
5. "Dawn"
6. "Fight for Peace"

== Awards and nominations ==
=== Academy Awards ===
- The music score, written by Ernest Gold, won the Academy Award for Best Original Score at the 1960 Oscars.

=== Grammy Award ===
- Ernest Gold won Best Soundtrack Album and Song of the Year at the 1961 Grammy Awards for the soundtrack and theme to Exodus respectively. It is the only instrumental song to ever receive that award to date. Oddly, the first notes of the great dramatic theme are identical to the opening theme of a somewhat obscure orchestral piece by Quincy Porter, New England Episodes, premiered in 1958 in Washington, DC.
- The world premiere of the complete film score with the Prague Philharmonic Orchestra conducted by Nic Raine from Tadlow Music received a Sammy Award for Best Newly Recorded Vintage Film Score of 2009.
- Sammy Awards for 2009

== Soundtrack chart positions ==
Chart (1961)	Peak position
Billboard Top LPs — Monaural	1
Billboard Top LPs — Stereo	1
