= Theme of Exodus =

Grammy winning song

Single by Ernest Gold

from the album Exodus
- B-side: "Summer In Cyprus"
- Released: 1960
- Genre: Epic, film score
- Length: 2:45
- Label: RCA Victor
- Songwriter: Ernest Gold
- Producer: Ernest Gold

"Theme from Exodus"

Single by Ferrante & Teicher

from the album Golden Piano Hits
- B-side: "Twilight"
- Released: October 1960
- Genre: Easy listening, film score
- Length: 2:54
- Label: United Artists
- Songwriter: Ernest Gold
- Producer: Don Costa

Ferrante & Teicher singles chronology
| "Theme from The Apartment" (1960) | "Theme from Exodus" (1960) | "Love Theme from One Eyed Jack" (1961) |

"Exodus"

Single by Eddie Harris

from the album Exodus to Jazz
- B-side: "Alicia"
- Released: February 1961
- Genre: Jazz
- Length: 2:01
- Label: United Artists
- Songwriter: Ernest Gold

Eddie Harris singles chronology
| "Exodus" (1961) | "My Buddy" (1961) |

"Theme of Exodus", is a melody composed by Ernest Gold. It serves as the main theme music to Otto Preminger's epic film Exodus, based on the 1958 novel of the same name by Leon Uris, which tells the story of founding of the modern State of Israel.

It was released on the soundtrack album for the picture. All music was written by Gold, who won both Best Soundtrack Album and Song of the Year at the 1961 Grammy Awards for the soundtrack and theme to Exodus respectively. It is the only instrumental theme to ever receive that award.

In 1960 Pat Boone wrote lyrics for it, and the song has become widely known as 'The Exodus Song' or 'This Land is Mine', from the chorus. It has also been recorded by Billy Eckstine, Hank & Carol Diamond, The Four Lads, The Chordettes, Andy Williams, The Lettermen, Bobby Vinton, Peter & Gordon, The Imperials, and others.

Following its initial film appearance, the theme has been recorded by many artists in both instrumental and vocal versions, and has also appeared in a number of subsequent films and television programs. Bob Marley incorporated portions of the theme into his song "Exodus".

An instrumental version of the song by Ferrante & Teicher made No. 3 in Canada in December 1960, No. 1 on the Cashbox Top 100 and No. 2 on the Billboard Hot 100 in January 1961, No. 6 in the UK in April 1961 and No. 2 on the Australian Kent Music Report charts also in April 1961. It reached No. 1 in New Zealand.

A jazz arrangement by saxophonist Eddie Harris hit the pop Top 40 and R&B charts in 1961, the single coming from his debut album Exodus to Jazz.

Swedish pop band the Hounds released a cover of "Theme of Exodus", retitled "Exodus". Initially released by record label Gazell on 14 July 1966 with "Sloop John B" as the B-side, it was re-issued on 6 October 1966 with "A Car, A Boat, A House, A Girl Like You" on the B-side. Their rendition reached No. 3 on Tio i Topp and No. 11 on Kvällstoppen in Sweden, becoming their first major hit single.

In 2012 artist Nina Paley published a short animated film entitled 'This Land is Mine' satirizing the history of the land called Israel/Palestine/Canaan/the Levant with the Andy Williams recording as the soundtrack.
