= Ike Aronowicz =

Israeli sailor and captain of the immigrant ship SS Exodus (1923–2009)

- 'אייק ארונוביץ
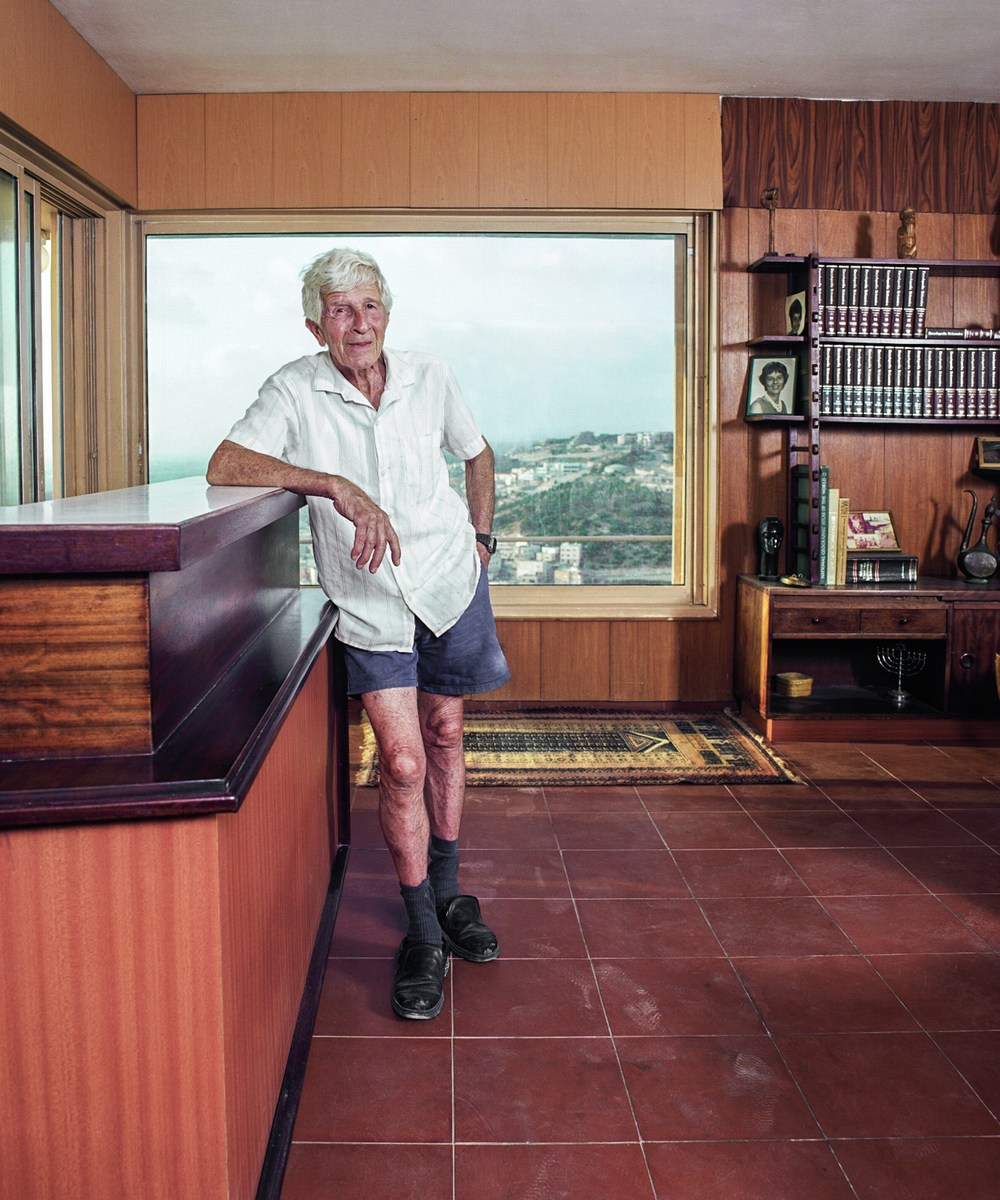
- Aronowicz in 2005
- Born: Yitzhak Aronowicz; 27 August 1923; Łódź, Poland
- Died: 23 December 2009 (aged 86); Israel
- Known for: captain of the immigrant ship SS Exodus

Yitzhak Aronowicz (Hebrew: יצחק "אייק" ארונוביץ'; 27 August 1923 – 23 December 2009) was an Israeli sailor, best known as the captain of the immigrant ship SS Exodus, which unsuccessfully tried to dock in British-era Palestine with Holocaust survivors on 11 July 1947, after the end of World War II. His surname was later spelled as Ahronovitch.

== Biography ==
Yitzhak (Ike) Aronowicz was born in Łódź. He grew up in the Free City of Danzig (now Gdańsk, Poland) and immigrated to Mandate Palestine at the age of 10. At the age of 23, he became the captain of the SS Exodus. He was married to Irene, a non-Jewish American woman from Berkeley, California.

Aronowicz died in Israel on 23 December 2009, aged 86. He was survived by two daughters, seven grandchildren, and two great-grandchildren.

== Naval career ==
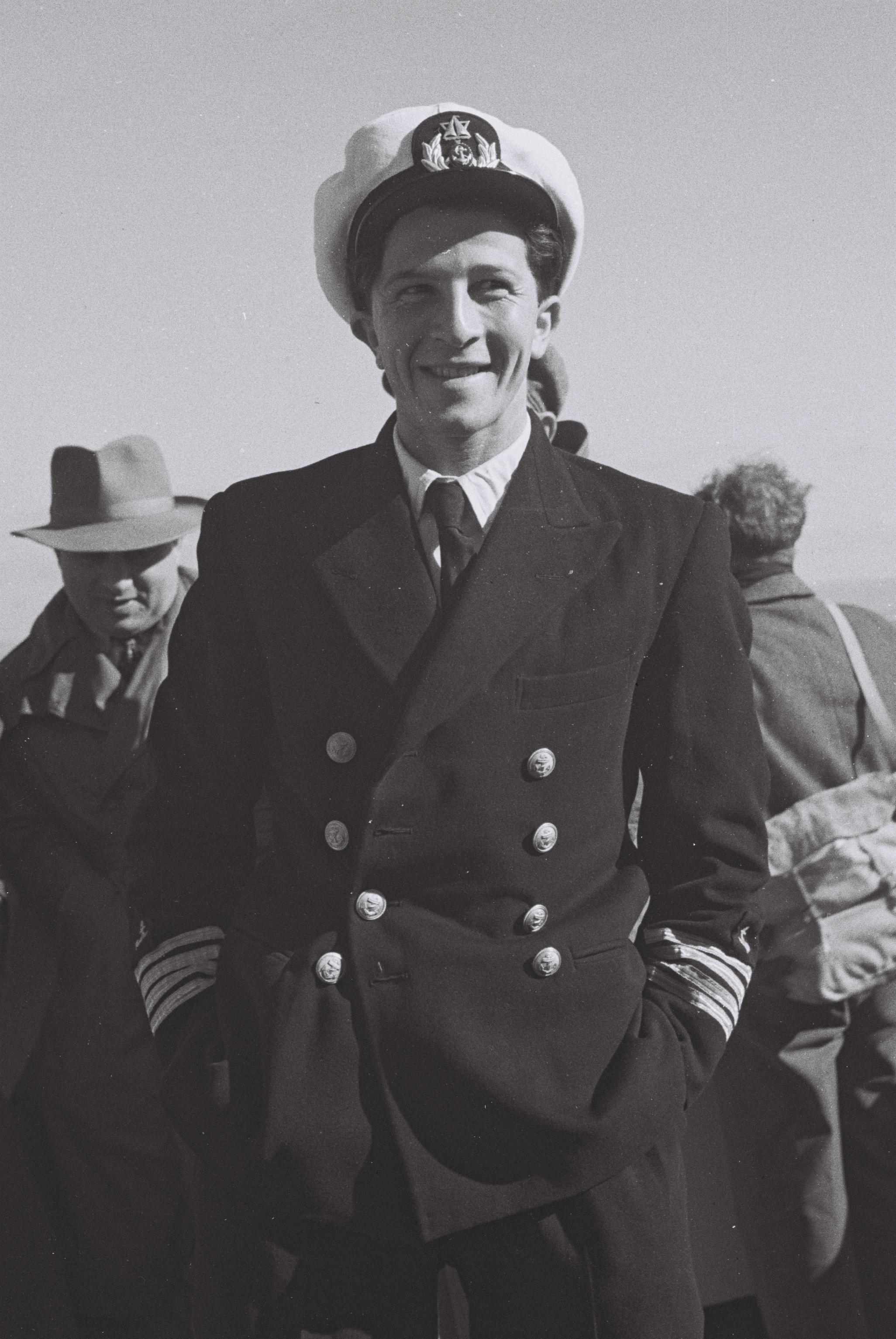
Ike Aronowicz as captain of the SS Exodus

Aronowicz was captain of the Exodus on its voyage from the port of Sète, France, a fishing town, on 11 July 1947, carrying 4,515 passengers. The ship was intercepted by a fleet of British war ships led by the British Royal Navy cruiser Ajax. A convoy of destroyers trailed the ship very early on in its voyage. Two British destroyers rammed the ship. After several hours of hand-to-hand combat between passengers armed with smoke bombs trying to prevent British sailors from boarding the ship, the British opened fire. Two immigrants and a crewman were killed, and many passengers seriously wounded. The ship was towed to Haifa, where it was abandoned. The passengers were deported to France, and then to Lübeck, Germany. In late 1947, Aronowicz served as the captain of the Pan York, another ship attempting to bring Jewish refugees to Palestine in defiance of the British blockade.

In 1949, following the establishment of the State of Israel, he took an officers course in London – for third, then second, and then first officer. In 1951, he led a sailors' strike which was broken up by the Israeli government. In 1958, he left to study in United States, earning a BA in international relations from Georgetown University and an MBA in economics from Columbia University. During this time, he worked as a driver for the Israeli Embassy. After completing his studies, he returned to Israel and established his own shipping company, running lines to China, Singapore, and Iran.

== Commemoration ==
In a statement after his death Shimon Peres, the Israeli president, said Ahronovitch had "made a unique contribution to the state which will never be forgotten".
