= Exodus (1960 film) =

1960 film by Otto Preminger

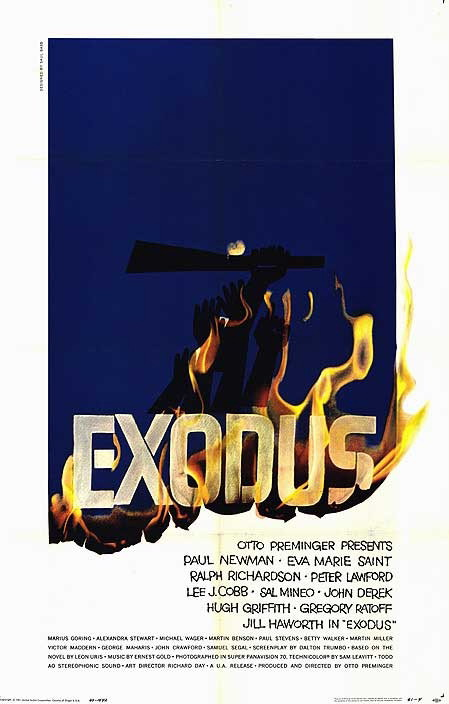
- Theatrical release poster by Saul Bass
- Directed by: Otto Preminger
- Screenplay by: Dalton Trumbo
- Based on: Exodus; 1958 novel by Leon Uris
- Produced by: Otto Preminger
- Starring: Paul Newman; Eva Marie Saint; Ralph Richardson; Peter Lawford; Sal Mineo; Jill Haworth; Lee J. Cobb; John Derek
- Cinematography: Sam Leavitt
- Edited by: Louis R. Loeffler
- Music by: Ernest Gold
- Production companies: Carlyle-Alpina, S.A.
- Distributed by: United Artists
- Release date: December 15, 1960 (Warner Theatre)
- Running time: 208 minutes
- Country: United States
- Language: English
- Budget: $4.5 million
- Box office: $8.7 million (US/ Canada) $20 million (worldwide)

Exodus is a 1960 American epic historical drama film about the founding of the State of Israel. Produced and directed by Otto Preminger, the screenplay was adapted by Dalton Trumbo from the 1958 novel of the same name by Leon Uris. The film stars an ensemble cast including Paul Newman, Eva Marie Saint, Ralph Richardson, Peter Lawford, Lee J. Cobb, Sal Mineo, John Derek, and George Maharis. The film's soundtrack music was written by Ernest Gold.

Preminger openly hired screenwriter Trumbo, who had been on the Hollywood blacklist for over a decade for being a communist and refusing to testify before the House Un-American Activities Committee, forcing him to work under assumed names. (He won the 1957 Academy Award for Best Screenplay under the pseudonym "Robert Rich.") Together with Spartacus, also written by Trumbo, Exodus is credited with ending the practice of blacklisting in the US motion picture industry.

Released on December 15, 1960, by United Artists, the film earned $8.7 million at the box office in the United States and Canada, and $20 million worldwide.

== Plot ==
After the Second World War, Katherine "Kitty" Fremont, a widowed American nurse, is sightseeing in Cyprus following a tour of duty for the U.S. Public Health Service in Greece. Her guide mentions the Karaolos internment camp on Cyprus, where thousands of Jews — many Holocaust survivors — are being detained. The British refuse them passage to Palestine. British General Sutherland, who knew her late husband, suggests Kitty volunteer at the internment camp. Feeling uncomfortable around Jews, she initially refuses but reconsiders.

At Karaolos, Kitty grows fond of Karen Hansen Clement, a Danish-Jewish teenager she meets in the camp, and offers to take her to America, but Karen declines. Her mother and siblings were Holocaust victims, and she is searching for her missing father while promoting the Zionist cause.

When Haganah rebel Ari Ben Canaan, a wartime captain in the British Army's Jewish Brigade, smuggles 611 Jews aboard a cargo ship for an illegal voyage to Palestine, military authorities blockade Famagusta harbor to prevent the ship's departure. Karen is among the Karaolos internees aboard the ship bound for Palestine. When Kitty learns Karen is aboard the ship, she uses her influence with Sutherland to be permitted to board to ensure Karen and other refugees boarded voluntarily. Karen confirms she has boarded voluntarily. The refugees stage a hunger strike, and Ari threatens to blow them up with the ship if not permitted to sail. When Kitty volunteers to stay onboard to provide medical services, Ari insists she must join the hunger strike. Eventually, the British permit the ship, renamed Exodus, to sail.

As opposition to partitioning Palestine into Arab and Jewish states intensifies, Karen's beau, Dov Landau, joins the Irgun, a radical pro-Zionist militant group led by Akiva Ben Canaan, Ari's uncle. Akiva interrogates Dov, who confesses to being a Sonderkommando in Auschwitz, where he learned dynamiting skills. Akiva's violent activities run counter to his brother Barak, Ari's father, who heads the mainstream Jewish Agency, working to create a Jewish state through political and diplomatic means. Barak fears the Irgun will derail these efforts.

Karen relocates to Gan Dafna, a Jewish kibbutz near Mount Tabor, close to the moshav where Ari was raised. Kitty and Ari fall in love, but Kitty pulls back after meeting Ari's family and learning about his previous love. Dafna, who was kidnapped, tortured, and murdered by Arabs, is the namesake of the Gan Dafna kibbutz. Ari helps locate Karen's father, Dr. Clement, now committed to a mental hospital in Jerusalem and in a dissociative state caused by the horrors he suffered in a Nazi concentration camp.

Akiva is imprisoned by the British in Acre fortress, and sentenced to hang after the Irgun bomb the King David Hotel. Ari plots an escape to free Akiva and Haganah and Irgun prisoners. Dov, who eluded capture, turns himself in to utilize his dynamiting expertise to facilitate the Acre Prison break. Hundreds of prisoners escape, and Akiva is fatally wounded in pursuit. Wounded, Ari makes it to Gan Dafna and is moved to Abu Yesha, an Arab village nearby where his lifelong Arab friend, Taha, is the mukhtar. Ari develops a life-threatening infection, and Kitty saves his life, rekindling their romance.

Dr. Lieberman is arrested by the British after they discover an illegal weapons cache hidden in the children's village. Taha warns Ari that Arab nationals plan to attack Gan Dafna and massacre the Jews. Ben Canaan orders the children evacuated as a detachment of Palmach troops arrives to reinforce Gan Dafna's defenses. Ecstatic over the prospect of the new nation, Karen visits Dov on night patrol at the Gan Dafna perimeter and proclaims her love for him. He vows they will marry after the war, but Karen is ambushed returning to Gan Dafna and murdered by Arabs. Taha's body is found hanging in Dov's village, killed by the Grand Mufti. A Star of David is carved into his body with a swastika and signs saying "Jude" are on village walls.

Karen and Taha are buried in one grave. Ari eulogizes them, saying that one day Jews and Arabs will peacefully share the land. Ari, Kitty, Dov, and a Palmach contingent board trucks to fight in the 1948 Arab–Israeli War.

== Cast ==
- Paul Newman as Ari Ben Canaan
- Eva Marie Saint as Kitty Fremont
- Ralph Richardson as Gen. Sutherland
- Peter Lawford as Maj. Caldwell
- Lee J. Cobb as Barak Ben Canaan
- Sal Mineo as Dov Landau
- John Derek as Taha
- Hugh Griffith as Plato Mandria
- Martin Miller as Dr. Odenheim
- Gregory Ratoff as Lakavitch
- Felix Aylmer as Dr. Ernst Lieberman
- David Opatoshu as Akiva Ben Canaan
- Jill Haworth as Karen Hansen Clement
- Marius Goring as Von Storch
- Alexandra Stewart as Jordana Ben Canaan
- Michael Wager as David Ben Ami
- Martin Benson as Mordechai
- Paul Stevens as Reuben
- Victor Maddern as Sergeant
- George Maharis as Yoav
- Esther Ofarim as Mrs. Hirschberg
- Barry Pillinger as staff car driver

== Production ==
Exodus was filmed on location in Israel and Cyprus. Although filming key elements of Exodus on the Mediterranean island of Cyprus was authentic, as it was the location of the British internment camps for Jewish refugees trying to reach Palestine, it was difficult, as the island was in the middle of a Greek insurgency against British rule, led by the Greek nationalist organisation EOKA. EOKA was considered a terrorist organisation by the British authorities in Cyprus, who were opposed to the filming of a movie on the island that seemed to combine anti-British sentiments with a storyline that appeared to show terrorist action could be successful. As a result, the British authorities refused to help Otto Preminger with the logistical side of filming. The only assistance given by the British authorities was the placement of an armed guard on the large number of decommissioned rifles used as props in the film, to prevent them from falling into the hands of EOKA and being recommissioned.

Relations between the director and actors were difficult, particularly with the male lead, Paul Newman. After Newman's suggested changes to the script were rejected by Preminger, and the actor given a dressing down for making the suggestions, Newman hid a mannequin on a high balcony on which he was due to play out a fight scene. At the end of the scene, Newman pretended to stumble, and threw the mannequin over the balcony. Not realising this was a practical joke, Preminger collapsed and required medical attention. At other times, Preminger and Newman were barely on speaking terms.

Leon Uris, author of the source novel Exodus, was originally signed to write a screenplay of the film, but Preminger rejected his script as excessively anti-British and anti-Arab. Preminger instead hired blacklisted writer Dalton Trumbo, with whom he collaborated on a script in forty days. Trumbo had never visited Israel, resulting in initial errors, such as locating the site of the Acre prison break, located in a coastal city, as taking place in the middle of the desert. Trumbo also made less use of Biblical themes than Uris wanted. His biographer wrote that Trumbo refused "to go back to Old Testament times, and follow the Jews through the centuries of the Diaspora and the horror of the Holocaust". Trumbo and Preminger did not share Uris's preoccupation with history as moulding the Israeli national character.

Paul Newman and Eva Marie Saint had previously appeared together as George Gibbs and Emily Webb, teenage lovers who subsequently marry in a 1955 musical version of Thornton Wilder's Our Town with Frank Sinatra as the stage manager, an episode of the anthology television series Producers' Showcase. Newman and Saint sing a duet during the malt shop sequence.

The Karen Hansen part was originally offered to Hayley Mills, but her parents turned it down. It was one of John Derek's last appearances as an actor.

== Reception ==
Bosley Crowther of The New York Times described the film as a "dazzling, eye-filling, nerve-tingling display of a wide variety of individual and mass reactions to awesome challenges and, in some of its sharpest personal details, a fine reflection of experience that rips the heart". The film's "principal weakness", Crowther wrote, "is that it has so much churning around in it that no deep or solid stream of interest evolves—save a vague rooting interest in the survival of all the nice people involved".

Philip K. Scheuer of the Los Angeles Times described the film as "a kaleidoscopic yet memorable impression of highlights from the long-time best seller by Leon Uris", with a "generally excellent" screenplay by Trumbo. Variety declared, "There is room to criticize Exodus—its length might be shortened to advantage; perhaps Preminger tried to crowd too much incident from the book for dramatic clarity, and some individual scenes could be sharpened through tighter editing. But the good outweighs the shortcomings. Preminger can take pride in having brought to the screen a Twentieth Century birth of a nation."

Richard L. Coe of The Washington Post stated that the film "has this vitality of the immediate and will be of incalculable influence in reaching those unfamiliar with the background of Israel ... It is safe to say that in several years, when this film will have played much of the world, its influence will have become critical." The Monthly Film Bulletin wrote, "Exodus lacks the historical imagination to cope with its theme on one level, the human awareness to dramatise it on the other. At the end of three and a half hours, its approach remains more exhausting than exhaustive. And the determination to be fair to all sides—almost the only character the script is prepared to dislike is the Nazi leader of the Arab terrorists—produces some strange consequences."

Roger Angell of The New Yorker wrote, "Such a bubbling pot of intrigue, violence, and hatred would almost seem to guarantee a lively film, but Mr. Preminger has approached his task with a painstaking reverence that would have been more suitable if he had been filming the original work of this title. He permits nearly everyone in his large cast to state his ideological and political convictions before and after each new turn of events, and the result is an awesome talkfest that is all too rarely interrupted by the popping of rifles."

Filmmaker Gideon Bachmann, who was present in Palestine in 1947, wrote for Film Quarterly (published by University of California Press) that, "[The film] distorts facts: the actual event upon which its title is based occurred in 1947, and the result of world-wide attempts to force the British to let the refugees into Palestine was that they were, instead, shipped back to Germany to another detention camp. Other 'facts' abound- the whole atmosphere of underground activity in pre-Israel Palestine is treated by Preminger in shallow cat-chase-dog international espionage style, whereas in reality it constitutes, of course, one of the most outstanding achievements of the human spirit in our age. For one who has lived through that period and that time in that place, Exodus is sacrilege.” Bachmann further criticized the film for Trumbo's "confused and anticlimactic" script, ultimately condemning Exodus as a hackneyed melodrama.

The film holds an approval rating of 65% on Rotten Tomatoes based on 17 reviews, with an average rating of 6/10. On Metacritic, it has a 70/100, based on 11 reviews, indicating "generally favorable reviews.

By September 1961, although having only played 22 locations overseas, the film had earned theatrical rentals of $14 million worldwide.

== Awards and nominations ==
Award	Category	Nominee(s)	Result
Academy Awards	Best Supporting Actor	Sal Mineo	Nominated
Academy Awards	Best Cinematography – Color	Sam Leavitt	Nominated
Academy Awards	Best Music Score of a Dramatic or Comedy Picture	Ernest Gold	Won
Golden Globe Awards	Best Supporting Actor – Motion Picture	Sal Mineo	Won
Golden Globe Awards	Best Original Score – Motion Picture	Ernest Gold	Nominated
Golden Globe Awards	Most Promising Newcomer – Female	Jill Haworth	Nominated
Grammy Awards	Best Sound Track Album or Recording of Music Score from Motion Picture or Television	Exodus – Ernest Gold	Won
International Film Music Critics Awards	Best Re-Recording of an Existing Score	Ernest Gold; Nic Raine and James Fitzpatrick	Won
Laurel Awards	Top Male Dramatic Performance	Lee J. Cobb	4th Place
Laurel Awards	Top Male Dramatic Performance	Paul Newman	4th Place
Laurel Awards	Top Male Supporting Performance	Sal Mineo	Won
Satellite Awards	Best Classic DVD	The Towering Inferno (as part of Paul Newman: The Tribute Collection)	Nominated

- The film was screened at the 1961 Cannes Film Festival, but was not entered into the competition for the Golden Palm.

== Soundtrack ==
The musical score, by Ernest Gold, won the Academy Award for Best Music Score of a Dramatic or Comedy Picture at the 33rd Academy Awards, and the main theme has been widely recorded by other artists.

A version of the theme by Ferrante & Teicher reached number 2 on the Billboard Hot 100 in January 1961. Other versions were recorded by jazz saxophonist Eddie Harris, Mantovani, Grant Green, Manny Albam, Andy Williams, Peter Nero, Connie Francis, Quincy Jones, the 1960s British instrumental band the Eagles and the Duprees, who sang the theme with lyrics written by Pat Boone.

Other artists to record the song include Edith Piaf (who sang French lyrics), gospel pianist Anthony Burger (in the Gaither Vocal Band's "I Do Believe"), and classical pianist Maksim Mrvica. Davy Graham reinvented the main theme on his 1963 album The Guitar Player. Trey Spruance of the Secret Chiefs 3 rescored the theme for "surf band and orchestra" on the album 2004 Book of Horizons. Howard Stern uses it for comedic effect when discussing aspects of Jewish life. The WWF used the main theme as wrestler Mr. Perfect's song. A portion of the theme was played live by 1970s Southern rock band Black Oak Arkansas, whose three lead guitarists used eBows to play the theme in harmony, embedded into an arrangement of the Buddy Holly song "Not Fade Away".

== Legacy ==
Often characterized as a "Zionist epic", the film has been identified by many commentators as having been enormously influential in stimulating Zionism and support for Israel in the United States. While Preminger's film softened the anti-British and anti-Arab sentiment of the novel, the film remains contentious for its depiction of the Arab–Israeli conflict. Like the novel, the film blames the 1948 Palestinian expulsion and flight on the Palestinians, making it a work of Nakba denial.

== See also ==
- List of American films of 1960
- SS Exodus
