= The Pans =

Common nickname for ships SS Pan Crescent and SS Pan York

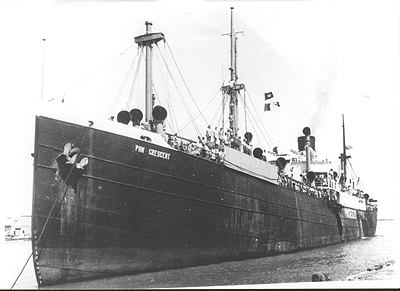
Atzma'ut (Pan Crescent)

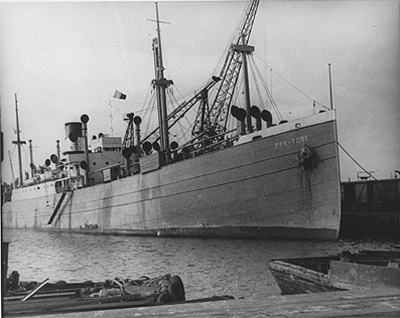
Kibbutz Galuyot (Pan-York)

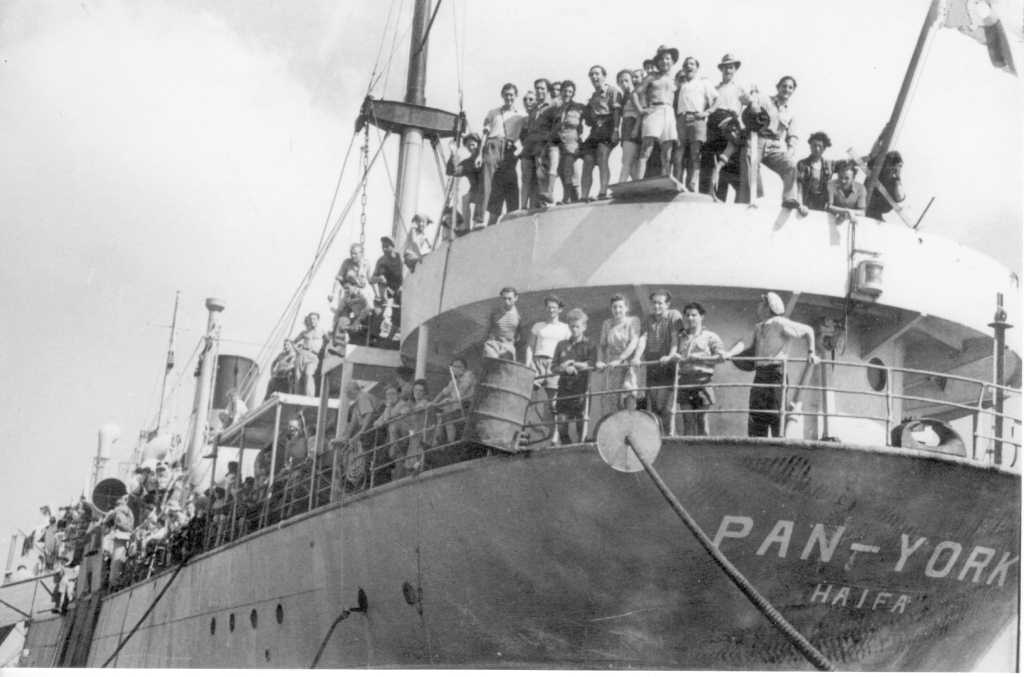
Pan-York, 1948

The Pans was a common nickname for two similar ships, SS Pan Crescent and the SS Pan York, purchased by Mossad LeAliyah Bet in the United States in 1947 and got operational names Atzma'ut ("Independence") and Kibbutz Galuyot ("Ingathering of the Exiles": Kibbutz Galuyot) respectively, to become two largest ships that attempted to take part in the illegal immigration (Aliyah Bet) to Mandatory Palestine. Both could carry about 7,500 passengers each.

The operation was commanded by Yossi Harel, who sailed Kibbutz Galuyot commanded by Nissan Leviathan. The commander on Atzma'ut was Dov Magen. The captains were Gad Hilev (Kibbutz Galuyot) and Ike Aronowicz (Atzma'ut).

Atzma'ut and Kibbutz Galuyot were intercepted by the Royal Navy (by the cruisers HMS Mauritius and HMS Phoebe) at an early stage of its trip under Panama flags in December 1947, the captains surrendered, sailed to the Cyprus internment camps, and moored there. After the Israeli Declaration of Independence the ships hoisted the Israeli flags and sailed off to Haifa. In early July 1948 the ships carried out emigration from Cyprus In the next months they also brought immigrants to Israel from Italy, Marseille and North Africa.
