= Louis Teicher =

American pianist

Louis Milton Teicher (pronounced as TIE-cher; August 24, 1924 – August 3, 2008) was an American piano player, half of the piano duo Ferrante & Teicher.

"No one was more blessed than I to have Lou Teicher as my best friend since we met at the Juilliard School of Music at the ages of 9 and 6. Although we were two individuals, at the twin pianos our brains worked as one. Lou was certainly one of the world's most gifted pianists. I will miss him dearly and as pianists it's ironic how we both ended up living on keys," his longtime partner Arthur Ferrante, who lived on Longboat Key, Florida, said in a statement at the time of Teicher's death. Ferrante subsequently died on September 19, 2009.

Teicher was born in Wilkes-Barre, Pennsylvania to a Jewish family. He became a resident of Englewood Cliffs, New Jersey in the 1970s.

Teicher died due to heart failure at his summer home in Highlands, North Carolina, aged 83.
