= Theme from The Apartment =

Single by Ferrante & Teicher

from the album The World's Greatest Themes
- B-side: "Lonely Room"
- Released: May 1960
- Genre: Easy listening
- Length: 2:51
- Label: United Artists
- Songwriter(s): Charles Williams
- Producer(s): Don Costa

Ferrante & Teicher singles chronology
"Lovers Symphony" (1959)	"Theme from The Apartment" (1960)	"Exodus" (1960)

"Theme from The Apartment" is a tune composed by Charles Williams. The song was originally released in 1949 and entitled "Jealous Lover", and was originally featured in the 1949 film The Romantic Age.

== Ferrante & Teicher recording ==
In 1960, the song was performed by Ferrante & Teicher It reached No. 9 on the Cashbox chart, No. 10 on the Billboard Hot 100, No. 24 on the Billboard R&B chart, and No. 44 on the UK Singles Chart. It was featured on their 1960 album The World's Greatest Themes. The song was arranged and produced by Don Costa.

It ranked No. 53 on Billboard magazine's Top 100 singles of 1960.

== Charts ==
=== Weekly charts ===
Chart (1960–61)	Peak position
Canada (CHUM Hit Parade)	22
New Zealand (Lever Hit Parade)	3
UK Singles Chart	44
U.S. Billboard Hot 100	10
U.S. Billboard Hot R&B Sides	24
U.S. Cash Box Top 100	9

=== Year-end charts ===
Chart (1960)	Rank
U.S. Billboard Hot 100	53
U.S. Cash Box	40

== Other versions ==
- Mantovani and His Orchestra released a version of the song on their 1951 album Mantovani Concert.
- Lew Douglas and His Orchestra released a version of the song on their 1960 album Themes From...
- Jack Lemmon released a version of the song as a single in 1960 in the UK, but it did not chart.
- Enoch Light and The Light Brigade released a version of the song on their 1960 album Big Bold and Brassy Percussion in Brass.
- Semprini released a version of the song as a single in 1960 in the UK, but it did not chart.
- Billy Vaughn and His Orchestra released a version of the song on their 1960 EP Themes from Billy Vaughn.
- Guy Lombardo and His Royal Canadians released a version of the song as a single in 1961, but it did not chart.
- The Boston Pops Orchestra released a version of the song on their 1963 EP Our Man in Boston.
- Sly and Robbie featuring Franklyn Bubbler Waul released a version of the song on their 1997 album Mambo Taxi.

== In popular culture ==
- The song was featured in the 1960 film The Apartment.
