= Karaolos prisoner of war camp =

Karaolos
- Prisoner-of-war camp Refugee camp Internment camp
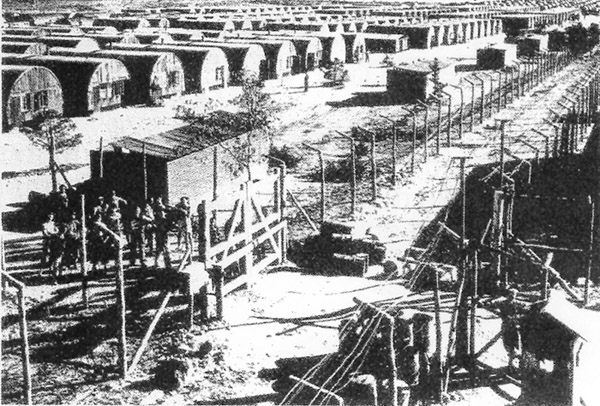
- The Karaolos camp was used to house Jewish internees in 1946–49.
- Location: Karaolos, Cyprus
- Operated by: British Empire
- Operational: 1916 – 1921; 1946 – 1949
- Inmates: Ottomans (1916 – 1920); Russians (1920 – 1921); Jews (1946 – 1949)

The Karaolos prisoner-of-war camp was established in Cyprus in 1916 with the intent of housing Ottoman troops captured during the course of World War I. The Ottomans were repatriated in February 1920, on the same year the camp received refugees of the Russian Civil War housing them for a year. Between 1946 and 1949, Karaolos resumed operation as part of the system of Cyprus internment camps used for the detention of Jewish refugees attempting to settle in Mandatory Palestine.

== Background ==
At the outbreak of the First World War Cyprus was nominally a part of the Ottoman Empire, while in fact being administered by the British Empire as agreed in the Cyprus Convention of 1878. On 5 November 1914, the Ottomans entered the conflict on the side of the Central Powers, prompting Britain to void the Cyprus Convention and annex the island as the two states were now at war. A number of security measures including telegraph and newspaper censorship, and martial law were introduced although Cyprus remained relatively isolated from the nearby theaters of operations. As it did not possess harbors big enough to accommodate large warships, local authorities shifted their focus to supplying the fighting fronts in its periphery with food as well as housing those wounded in actions, prisoners of war as well as refugees.

== Operation ==
The Karaolos prisoner of war camp was established in September 1916, when 2,000 Ottoman soldiers captured during the course of the Arab Revolt, the Gallipoli Campaign and the Sinai and Palestine Campaigns were transported to the island. It was located in the Karaolos area 2 kilometres (1.2 miles) northwest of Famagusta's old town. It is variously claimed that the camp once stood on what today is a UNFICYP camp on the west side of the Ismet Inonu Bulvari or at the current address of the Gulseren Education Battalion military camp. The camp was erected on land seized from local farmers, whose requests for compensation were rejected by the colonial authorities. The locale was specially selected for the low density of its Muslim population (20.7%), as an additional security measure.

Turkish Cypriots did in fact attempt a prison break operation, however it was exposed by British intelligence before it could be executed. A total of 217 Ottoman POWs died in detention, a number were killed while attempting to escape from the camp, while the majority fell victim to poor living conditions. The prisoners received meals consisting of mashed and boiled marrow, bread made from barley flour, carob and olives. According to eyewitness accounts they were dressed in ragged clothing and did not possess shoes. They spent their free time creating improvised trench art, such as prayer beads made of olive seeds and wooden cigarette boxes. A number of prisoners were conscripted into labor units that performed stevedoring. Following the end of the war some chose to stay on the island while the rest were repatriated in February 1920.

On 14 November 1920, the remnants of Pyotr Wrangel's Anti-Bolshevik White Army evacuated their last stronghold in Russia. A few hundred of those refugees of the Russian Civil War, traveled to Karaolos through Istanbul, settling in 20 huts previously used by the Ottoman POWs. Most departed from Cyprus a year later, while a few settled on the island permanently. In 1946, Karaolos became part of the system of Cyprus internment camps intended to prevent Jewish refugees from settling in Mandatory Palestine, with 30,000 being housed in the wider Famagusta region. Karaolos incorporated Camps 55, 60, 61, 62 and 63, consisting of army tents and a few Nissen huts. A number of internees managed to escape through a tunnel with the assistance of Jewish resistance organizations and local sympathizers from AKEL. From November 1946 to the time of the Israeli Declaration of Independence in May 1948, Cyprus detainees were allowed into Palestine at a rate of 750 people per month. On January 24, 1949, the British began sending these detainees to Israel, with the last of them departing for Israel on February 11, 1949.

== See also ==
- Exodus (1960 film)
