= Cyprus internment camps =

British internment camps in Cyprus

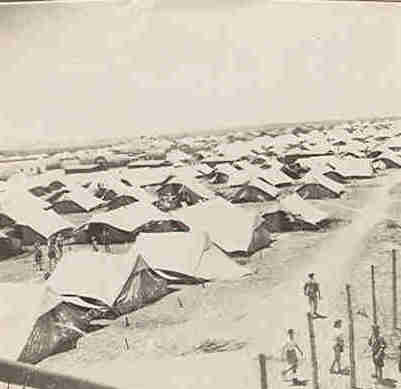
Cyprus deportation camp

The Cyprus internment camps were camps maintained in Cyprus by the British government for the internment of Jews who had immigrated or attempted to immigrate to Mandatory Palestine in violation of British policy. There were a total of 12 camps, which operated from August 1946 to January 1949, and in total held 53,510 Jews.

Britain informed the UN that it would no longer administer the Mandate for Palestine on February 14, 1947. This prompted the UN General Assembly to recommend partition of Palestine into independent Jewish and Arab states on November 29. Some 28,000 Jews were still interned in the camps when the Mandate was dissolved, partition was enacted, and the independent State of Israel was established at midnight local time on May 14, 1948. About 11,000 internees remained in the camps as of August 1948, with the British releasing and transporting them to Haifa at the rate of 1,500 a month. Israel began the final evacuation of the camps in December 1948, with the last 10,200 internees (mainly men of military age) being evacuated to Israel during January and February 1949.

== History ==
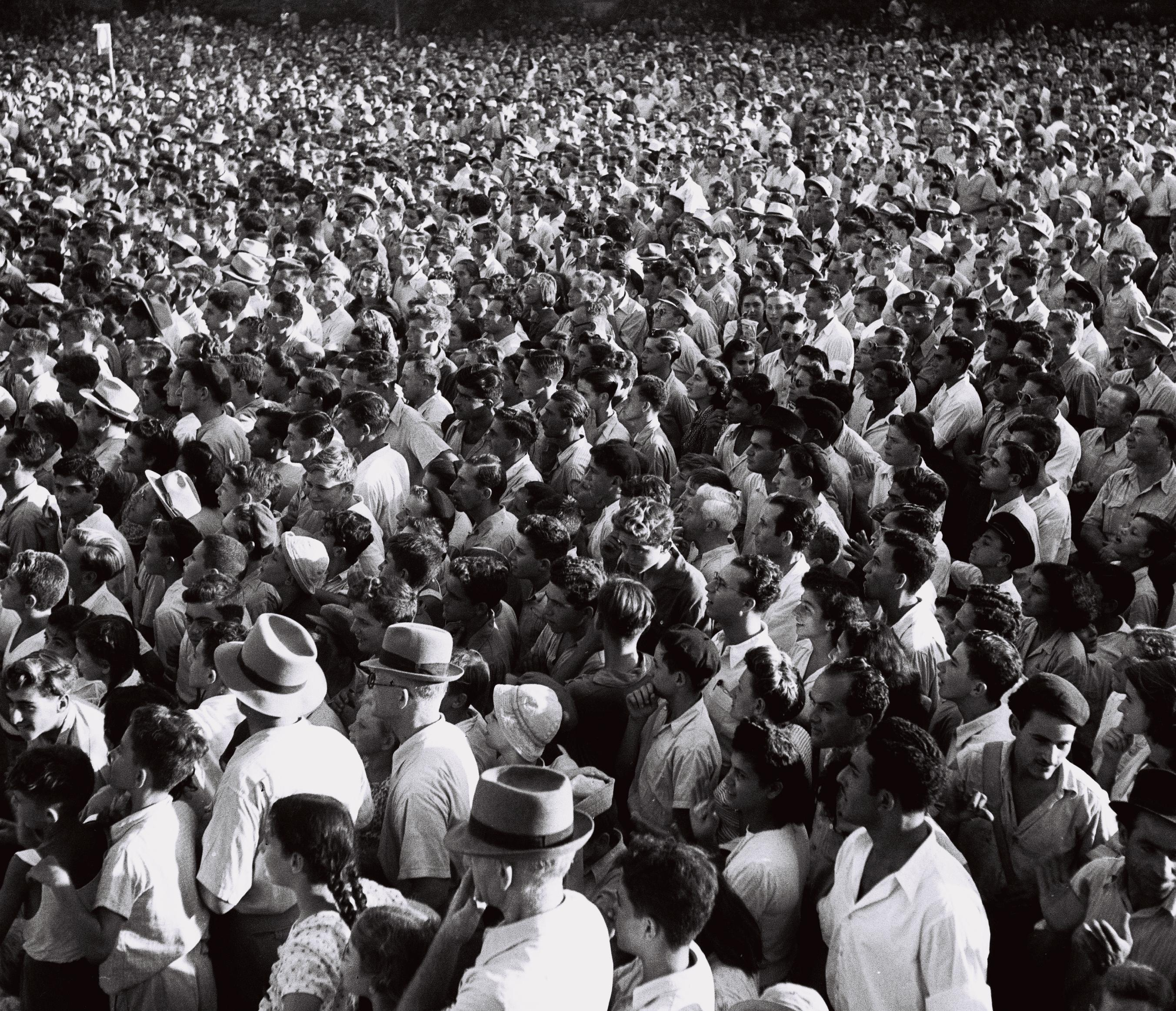
Anti-deportation protest rally, Tel Aviv, 1946

In the White Paper of 1939, the British government decided that future Jewish immigration to Palestine would be limited to 75,000 over the next five years, with further immigration subject to Arab consent. At the end of World War II, there were still 10,938 immigration certificates remaining but the five years had expired. The British government agreed to continue issuing 1,500 certificates per month, but the influx of Jews, especially from the displaced person camps in Europe, well exceeded that number. It was decided in August 1946 to hold many of the illegal immigrants on Cyprus. Previous places of detention had included Atlit detainee camp in Palestine, and a camp in the Mauritius. A few thousand refugees, mostly Greeks but also a "considerable number" of Jews from the Balkans, had reached Cyprus during the war years.

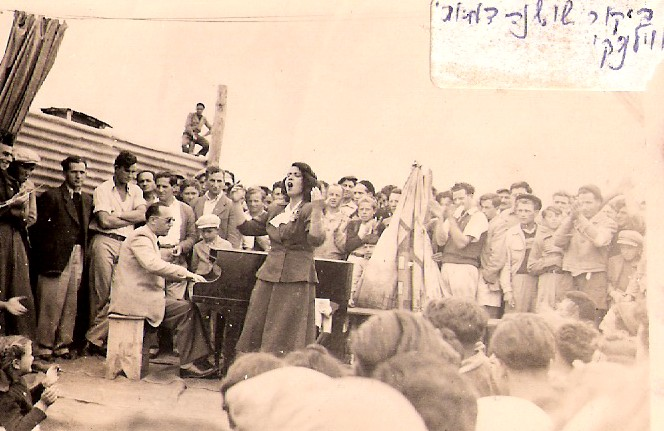
Moshe Vilenski playing piano and Shoshana Damari singing at Internment Camps in Cyprus (ca. 1947–48)

At its peak there were nine camps in Cyprus, located at two sites about 50 km apart. They were Caraolos, north of Famagusta, and Dekhelia, outside of Larnaca. The first camp, at Caraolos, had been used from 1916 to 1923 for Turkish prisoners of war.

The majority of Cyprus detainees were intercepted before reaching Palestine, usually by boat. Some were on vessels that had successfully run the British blockade, but were caught in Palestine. Most of them were Holocaust survivors, about 60% from the displaced person camps and others from the Balkans and other Eastern European countries. A very small group of Moroccan Jews was also in the camps. The prisoners were mostly young, 80% between 13 and 35, and included over 6,000 orphans. About 2,000 children were born in the camps. The births took place in the Jewish wing of the British Military Hospital in Nicosia. Some 400 Jews died in the camps, and were buried in Margoa cemetery.

== Escape attempts ==
A number of escape attempts took place while the camps were active. The most significant was in August 1948, when an estimated 100 inmates escaped a detention camp via a secret tunnel the British believed had been dug over a period of six months. The British believed that the escapees were being met by Jewish representatives in Cyprus, and "selected male specialists" among the refugees were being put on small boats capable of reaching Israel in 24 hours, which were being brought to Cyprus at night. Some 29 refugees were arrested over the incident and given prison sentences ranging from four to nine months. One man managed to escape while being transported from court to prison. In January 1949, as the British began deporting the final batch of inmates to Israel, an unspecified number of Jews who had escaped the camps and had remained at large in Cyprus turned themselves in so they could be sent to Israel.

== Evacuation ==
In October 1946, the British government decided to gradually allow 96,000 Jews to immigrate to Palestine at the rate of 1,500 a month. Half of those admitted would be inmates of the camps in Cyprus; the British feared that if the population of the camps continued growing, there would be an uprising among the prisoners.

When on February 14, 1947, Britain informed the United Nations that it would no longer administer the mandate for Palestine, some 28,000 Jews were still interned in the camps of Cyprus. After the declaration of independence of the State of Israel in May 1948, there were still 24,000 illegal immigrants in the Cypriot internment camps, who expected to be released quickly but faced the refusal of the British authorities to charter ships under their flag to take them to the Promised Land. The Jewish Agency prepared itself the organization of transports for the absorption of immigrants.

Two weeks later, with immigration still stalled, the Cypriot detainees appealed to the UN to pressure for their release. On June 7, a hunger strike took place. Finally, emigration from Cyprus began in early July 1948 with two large ships Atzma'ut and Kibbutz Galuyot which carried more than 4,100 immigrants from its camps. However, in order not to help Israel in the War of Independence, the British still banned immigration of men of conscription age, i.e. those aged 18 to 45. Between the British authorities and the detainees, a struggle ensued over permission to release the fathers of 170 babies with their children. About 11,000 internees, mainly men of military age, imprisoned for most of the war, remained in the camps in August 1948. In January 1949, an undetermined number of Jews who had previously been able to escape the camps and had remained free in Cyprus, surrendered in order to be sent to Israel.

Despite the initial refusal and procrastination of the British, aliyah was finally approved and the camps were definitively evacuated on February 11, 1949, although some families and individuals remained in Cyprus until November 1949 for health reasons or because they had young babies.

== Immigration quota system ==
From November 1946 to the time of the Israeli Declaration of Independence in May 1948, Cyprus detainees were allowed into Palestine at a rate of 750 people per month. During 1947-48, special quotas were given to pregnant women, nursing mothers, and the elderly. Released Cyprus detainees amounted to 67% of all immigrants to Palestine during that period. Following Israeli independence, the British began deporting detainees to Israel at a rate of 1,500 per month. They amounted to 40% of all immigration to Israel during the war months of May–September 1948. The British kept about 11,000 detainees, mainly men of military age, imprisoned throughout most of the war. On January 24, 1949, the British began sending these detainees to Israel, with the last of them departing for Israel on February 11, 1949.

== Camp conditions ==
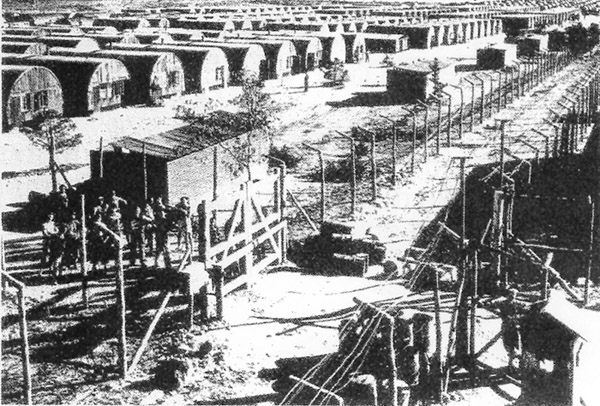
Cyprus winter camp

The American Jewish Joint Distribution Committee (the "Joint") provided most of the detainees' needs, including welfare and medical aid, two nurseries, and extra food rations. The Jewish Agency sent teachers and social workers from Palestine but refused to give direct aid to the detainees on the grounds that it would grant legitimacy to the camps.

Conditions in the camps were very harsh, with poor sanitation, crowding, lack of privacy, and shortage of clean water being the main complaints. The local Joint director Morris Laub considered that the German prisoners of war housed in adjacent camps were treated better.

== In popular media ==
The 1960 film Exodus, adapted from the book of the same name by Leon Uris, starts with the arrival of Jews in a camp. The presence of Palestine volunteers is also shown.

Ruth Gruber documents the daily life of Jewish detainees and conditions in the camps of Xylotympou and Caraolos in her book Exodus 1947: The Ship that Launched a Nation.

The book series "Promise of Zion" by Robert Elmer references the camps as the main character avoids being captured with other Jews on board a ship, and again when he returns to Cyprus in search of his mother. The camps' living condition are described in more detail here.

== See also ==
- Karaolos prisoner of war camp
