= Ferrante & Teicher =

American piano duo

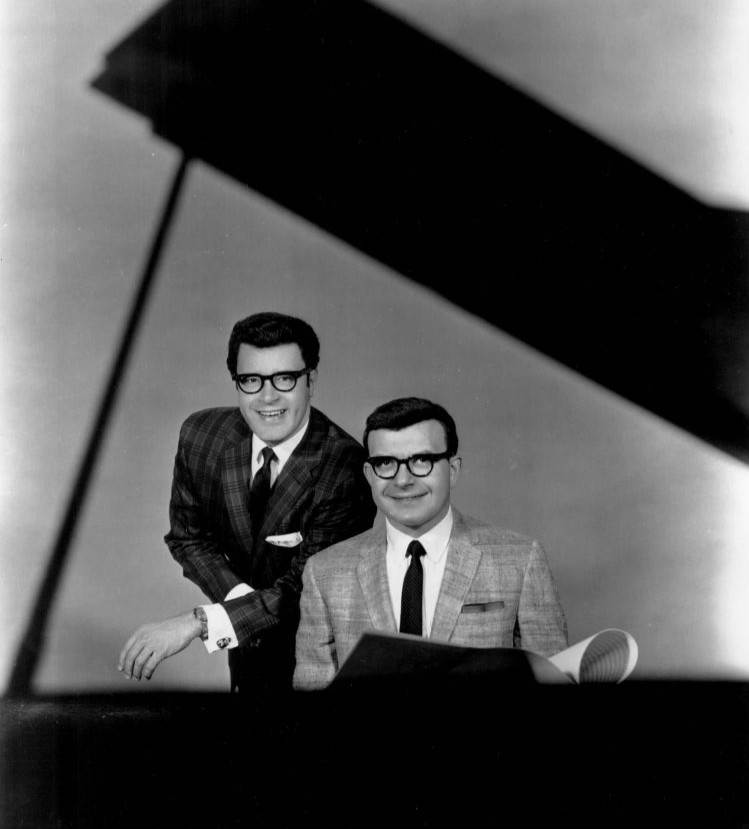
- Ferrante & Teicher, c 1960

Background information
- Genres: Space age pop; Musical; Easy listening; Classical music
- Instrument: Piano
- Years active: 1947–1989
- Labels: DME; London; UAR; His Master's Voice
- Members: Arthur Ferrante; Louis Teicher

Ferrante & Teicher were a duo of American pianists known for their arrangements of familiar classical pieces, movie soundtracks, and show tunes, as well as their signature style of florid, intricate, and fast-paced piano playing performances.

== Career ==
Arthur Ferrante (September 7, 1921, New York City – September 19, 2009, Longboat Key, Florida), and Louis Teicher (August 24, 1924, Wilkes-Barre, Pennsylvania – August 3, 2008, Highlands, North Carolina) met while studying at the Juilliard School of Music in New York in 1930. Musical prodigies, they began performing as a piano duo while still in school. After graduating, they joined the Juilliard faculty.

In 1947, they launched a full-time concert career, at first playing nightclubs, then quickly moving up to playing classical music with orchestral backing. Steven Tyler of Aerosmith relates the story that in the 1950s the two students practiced in the home of his grandmother Constance Neidhart Tallarico. Between 1950 and 1980, they were a major American "easy listening" act and scored four big U.S. hits: "Theme from The Apartment" (Pop #10), "Theme from Exodus" (Pop #2), "Tonight" (Pop #8), and "Midnight Cowboy" (Pop #10). They performed and recorded regularly with pops orchestras popular standards by George Gershwin, Jerome Kern, Cole Porter, Richard Rodgers, the Sherman Brothers and others. In 1973, they did the Hollywood Radio Theater theme for the Rod Serling radio drama series, The Zero Hour.

The duo also experimented with prepared pianos, adding paper, sticks, rubber, wood blocks, metal bars, chains, glass, mallets, and other found objects to piano string beds. In this way they were able to produce a variety of bizarre sounds that sometimes resembled percussion instruments and at other times resulted in special effects that sounded as if they were electronically synthesized.

Both men were initiated as honorary members of Tau Kappa Epsilon at Central State University (now University of Central Oklahoma) while on tour.

Ferrante and Teicher ceased performing in 1989 and retired to Longboat Key and Siesta Key, respectively, close to each other on the west coast of Florida. They continued to play together occasionally at a local piano store.

CDs of their music, some of it not previously released, have continued to appear.

Louis Teicher died of a heart attack in August 2008, at age 83. Arthur Ferrante died of natural causes on September 19, 2009, twelve days after his 88th birthday; he had once said he wanted to live one year for each piano key. Arthur was survived by his wife, Jena; his daughter, Brenda Eberhardt; and two granddaughters.

== Cultural influence ==
The album cover of Pavement's debut Slanted and Enchanted is an altered version of Ferrante & Teicher's album Keyboard Kapers (a reissue of Dynamic Twin Pianos).

== Discography ==
=== Albums ===
==== 1950s ====
- Mississippi Boogie/African Echoes (1952) Joe Davis Records
- Piano Playhouse (1952) MGM E209
- Hi-Fireworks (1953) Columbia CL-573
- Can-Can & Me & Juliet (1954) Columbia CL-6264
- Continental Holiday (1954) Columbia CL-6291
- Xmas Hi-Fivories (1954) Westminster WL-3044
- Rhapsody (1955) Urania URA-78011
- Rachmaninoff Two-Piano Suites (1955) Westminster XWN-18059
- Original Variations for Two Pianos (1955) Westminster XWN-18169
- Ravel/Debussy (1955) Westminster XWN-18219
- Encores! (1955) Westminster XWN-18786
- Postcards from Paris (1955) Westminster WP-6001
- Adventure in Carols (1955) Westminster WP-6021
- Soundblast (1956) Westminster WP-6041 (Re-released as Soundproof WPS-107 using the 1958 Soundproof cover)
- Heavenly Sounds in Hi-Fi (1957) ABC ABCS-221 (Re-released in 1966 under the title Heavenly Sounds of Ferrante & Teicher, ABCS-555)
- Soundproof (1958) Westminster WP-6014
- Ferrante & Teicher with Percussion (1958) ABCS-248 (Re-released in 1966 under the title Temptation, ABCS-561)
- Blast Off (1959) ABCS-285 (Overdubbed with strings and re-released in 1966 under the title We've Got Rhythm, ABCS-556)
- Play Light Classics (1959) ABCS-313
- Themes from Broadway Shows (1959) ABCS-336

==== 1960s ====
- Dream Concerto (1960) UAS-6103
- Dynamic Twin Pianos (1960) WWS-8504
- The World's Greatest Themes (1960) UAS-6121
- Latin Pianos (1960) UAS-6135
- Golden Piano Hits (1961) WWS-8505
- Broadway to Hollywood (1961) Columbia CS 8407
- Goodbye Again OST (1961) UAS-5091
- Love Themes (1961) WWS-8514
- West Side Story (1961) UAS-6166
- Tonight! (1961) UAS-6171
- Golden Themes from Motion Pictures (1962) UAS-6210
- Pianos in Paradise (1962) UAS-6230
- Snowbound (1962) UAS-6233
- The Keys to Her Apartment (1962) UAS-6247
- Keyboard Kapers (1963) UAS–6284 (reissue of Dynamic Twin Pianos)
- Love Themes from Cleopatra (1963) UAS-6290
- Holiday for Pianos (1963) UAS-6298
- Concert for Lovers (1963) UAS-6315
- Exotic Love Themes (1963) UAS-6340
- Fifty Fabulous Favorites (1964) UAS-6343
- My Fair Lady (1964) UAS-6361
- The Enchanted World of Ferrante & Teicher (1964) UAS-6375
- The People's Choice (1964) UAS-6385
- Springtime (1964) UAS-6406
- By Popular Demand (1965) UAS-6416
- Only the Best (1965) UAS-6434
- A Rage to Live OST (1965) UAS-5130
- The Ferrante & Teicher Concert—Part 1 (1965) UAS-6444
- The Ferrante & Teicher Concert—Part 2 (1965) UAS-6475
- For Lovers of All Ages (1966) UAS-6483
- You Asked for It!(1966) UAS-6526
- We Wish You a Merry Christmas (1966) UAS-6536
- The Twin Piano Magic Volume 2 (1966) ABC-Paramount 559
- The Piano Artistry (1967) S 21004 - Unart (Canada)
- Our Golden Favorites (1967) UAS-6556
- A Man & a Woman (1967) UAS-6572
- In the Heat of the Night (1967) UAS-6624
- Live for Life (1967) UAS-6632
- The Painted Desert (1968) UAS-6636
- A Bouquet of Hits (1968) UAS-6659
- Love in the Generation Gap (1968) UAS-6671
- Listen to the Movies with Ferrante & Teicher (1969) UAS-6701
- Midnight Cowboy (1969) UAS-6725 (#49CAN)

==== 1970s ====
- Getting Together (1970) UAS-5501 (#75CAN)
- Love Is a Soft Touch (1970) UAS-6771
- The Best of Ferrante & Teicher (1970) UAS-73
- The Music Lovers (1971) UAS-6792
- It's Too Late (1971) UAS-5531
- Fiddler on the Roof (1972) UAS-5552
- Play the Hit Themes (1972) UAS-5588
- Salute Nashville (1972) UAS-5645
- Hear and Now (1973) UA-LA018F
- The Roaring Twenties (1973) UA-LA072F
- Killing Me Softly (1974) UA-LA118F
- Dial "M" for Music (1974) UA-LA195F
- The Very Best of Ferrante & Teicher (1974) UA-LA379E
- Greatest Love Themes of the 20th Century (1975) UA-LA101-G2
- In a Soulful Mood (1975) UA-LA227G
- Beautiful, Beautiful (1975) UA-LA316G
- Body & Soul (1975) UA-LA360G
- The Carpenters Songbook (1976) UA-LA490G
- Fill the World with Love (1976) UA-LA547G
- Spirit of "'76" (1976) UA-LA573G
- Piano Portraits (1977) UA-LA585G
- Feelings (1977) UA-LA662G
- Rocky & Other Knockouts (1977) UA-LA782G
- Star Wars (1978) UA-LA855G
- You Light Up My Life (1978) UA-LA908G
- Supermen (1979) UA-LA941G
- Classical Disco (1979) UA-LA980G

==== 1980s ====
- 30th Anniversary—On Stage (1984) Avant-Garde (Bainbridge) AVG-1001
- A Few of Our Favorites—On Stage (1985) Avant-Garde (Bainbridge) AVG-1002
- American Fantasy—On Stage (1986) Avant-Garde (Bainbridge) AVG-1003
- Dos Amigos (1988) Avant-Garde (Bainbridge) AVG-1004

==== 1990s ====
- 40th Anniversary—On Stage (1992) Avant-Garde (Intersound) AVG-1005
- All-Time Great Motion Picture Themes (1993) 0777-7-98823-2
- The Ernie Kovacs Record Collection (1997) Varèse Sarabande – VSD-5789
- The Ferrante & Teicher Collection (1998) Avant-Garde (Varèse Sarabande Vintage) AVG-1006

==== 2000s ====
- The Sound of Music (2000) Avant-Garde/Varèse Sarabande Records AVG-1007
- Denizens of the Deep (2001) Avant-Garde /Varèse Sarabande Records 302 066 261 2
- Can-Can and Me & Juliet/Continental Holiday (2001) Sony/Collectables Records CDL-CD-6692
- Christmas Is So Special (2000) 724352905720
- Great 1970's Motion Picture Themes (2001) 72435-30518-2
- America Forever (2002) Avant-Garde/Varèse Sarabande Records 302 066 312 2

=== Singles ===
Year	Titles (A-side, B-side) Both sides from same album except where indicated	Chart positions				Album
Year	Titles (A-side, B-side) Both sides from same album except where indicated	US	US – AC	CB	CAN CHUM/RPM	Album
1951	"Susannah's Last Stand" b/w "Caravan"	-	-	-	-	Hi-Fireworks
1952	"Tabu" b/w "Semper Fidelis"	-	-	-	-	Hi-Fireworks
1958	"Che Si Dice (Keh See Deechay; That Is Said)" b/w "How High the Moon"	-	-	-	-	Ferrante and Teicher with Percussion
1958	"Aflame" b/w "How High the Moon"	-	-	-	-	Ferrante and Teicher with Percussion
1959	"Side Saddle" b/w "Prairie Blues"	-	-	-	-	Non-album tracks
1959	"Lovers Symphony" b/w "Dream Concerto"	-	-	-	-	Dream Concerto
1960	"Theme from The Apartment" b/w "Lonely Room"	10	-	9	22	The World's Greatest Themes
1960	"Exodus" b/w "Twilight" (from Tonight)	2	-	1	3	Golden Piano Hits
1961	"Love Theme from One Eyed Jacks" /	37	-	39	40	Love Themes
1961	"Gone with the Wind"	-	-	110	-	Love Themes
1961	"Goodbye Again" b/w "Possessed" (from The Many Moods of Ferrante & Teicher)	85	-	84	-	Non-album track
1961	"Tonight" b/w "Dream of Love" (from The Many Moods of Ferrante & Teicher)	8	2	6	14	Music from the Motion Picture West Side Story and Other Motion Picture and Broadway Hits
1962	"Smile" /	94	18	93	-	Tonight
1962	"Street of Palms (Via Margalene)"	-	-	133	-	Non-album tracks
1962	"Lisa" /	98	-	81	-	Non-album tracks
1962	"Negligee"	-	-	tag	-	Pianos in Paradise
1962	"Lida Rose" b/w "Take Me Along"	-	-	144	-	Themes from Broadway Shows
1962	"Theme from Taras Bulba" b/w "Theme from the Eleventh Hour" (from Concert for Lovers)	116	-	107	-	Non-album tracks
1963	"Theme from Lawrence of Arabia" b/w "Paris Joy Ride" (from Holiday for Pianos)	84	-	102	-	Non-album tracks
1963	"Antony and Cleopatra Theme" b/w "Caesar and Cleopatra Theme"	83	-	115	-	Love Themes from Cleopatra
1963	"Crystal Fingers" b/w "Greensleeves" (from Concert for Lovers)	127	-	132	-	Non-album tracks
1964	"It's All Right" b/w "Corn Pone"	-	-	-	-	Non-album tracks
1964	"The Seventh Dawn" b/w "You're Too Much" (from The Keys to Her Apartment)	124	-	-	-	Non-album tracks
1965	"The Greatest Story Ever Told" b/w "To Spring" (from Springtime)	101	-	143	-	By Popular Demand
1965	"Country Boy" b/w "The Knack" (From "A Man and a Woman" and Other; Motion Picture Themes)	-	-	-	-	Only the Best
1966	"Khartoum" b/w "Firebird"	-	21	-	-	You Asked for It!
1966	"A Man and a Woman" b/w "Dark Eyes" (from The Piano Artistry of Ferrante & Teicher)	-	24	-	-	"A Man and a Woman" and Other Motion Picture Themes
1967	"Live for Life" b/w "Pavanne" (from In the Heat of the Night)	-	27	-	-	Live for Life
1968	"Here Is Where I Belong" b/w "Rock-a-Bye Baby" (from Midnight Cowboy)	-	-	-	-	Non-album tracks
1968	"A Boy and a Girl" b/w "Prelude to Love" (from Love in the Generation Gap)	-	-	-	-	Non-album tracks
1969	"Andrea" b/w "Joanna"	-	-	-	-	Listen to the Movies with Ferrante & Teicher
1969	"Midnight Cowboy" b/w "Popi" (original pressings) "Rock-a-Bye-Baby" (later pressings)	10	2	10	11	Midnight Cowboy
1970	"Lay Lady Lay" b/w "Theme from 'Z' (To Yelasto Pedi)"	99	16	71	71	Getting Together
1970	"Pieces of Dreams" b/w "Magical Connection"	-	28	-	-	Love Is a Soft Touch
1971	"The Music Lovers" b/w "Love Is Now"	-	39	-	-	The Music Lovers
1971	"Diamonds Are Forever" b/w "There's a New Day Coming"	-	-	-	-	Ferrante & Teicher Play the Hit Themes
1972	"Love Theme from the Godfather" b/w "There's a New Day Coming"	-	28	110	-	Ferrante & Teicher Play the Hit Themes
1972	"Everything You Always Wanted to Know; About Sex but Were Afraid to Ask" b/w "Tranquillo"	-	-	-	-	Hear and Now
1973	"American Pie" b/w "Oh to Be Young Again"	-	-	-	-	Hear and Now
1973	"Last Tango in Paris" b/w "Grass Roots" (from Salute Nashville)	-	-	115	-	Killing Me Softly
1976	"Theme from Breakheart Pass" b/w "Theme from Mahogany" (from Piano Portraits)	-	-	-	-	Non-album track
1976	"Gonna Fly Now (Theme from 'Rocky')" b/w "You Take My Heart Away" (Non-album track)	-	-	-	-	Rocky and Other Knockouts
1977	"Theme from 'New York, New York'" b/w "A Bridge Too Far (Main Theme)"	-	-	-	-	Rocky and Other Knockouts
1978	"Theme from Star Trek" b/w "Swinging on a Star"	-	-	-	-	Star Wars

=== Track appearances ===
- Filme, Die Man Nicht Vergisst, United Artists Records
- Great Motion Picture Themes, United Artists Records, 1960
- Music to Read James Bond By, United Artists Records, 1965
- Music to Read James Bond By Vol. 2, United Artists Records, 1965
- Dusty Fingers Volume One, "Lady Love", Strictly Breaks Records, 1997
- Ultra-Lounge—Christmas Cocktails Part Two, Capitol Records, 1997
- Ultra-Lounge Vol. 16—Mondo Hollywood, Capitol Records, 1997
- The Best of Blue Juice, Blue Note, 2001
- Hard to Find Orchestral Instrumentals II, Eric Records, 2003
