= Raymond Murray =

United States Marine Corps general (1913–2004)

Raymond LeRoy Murray
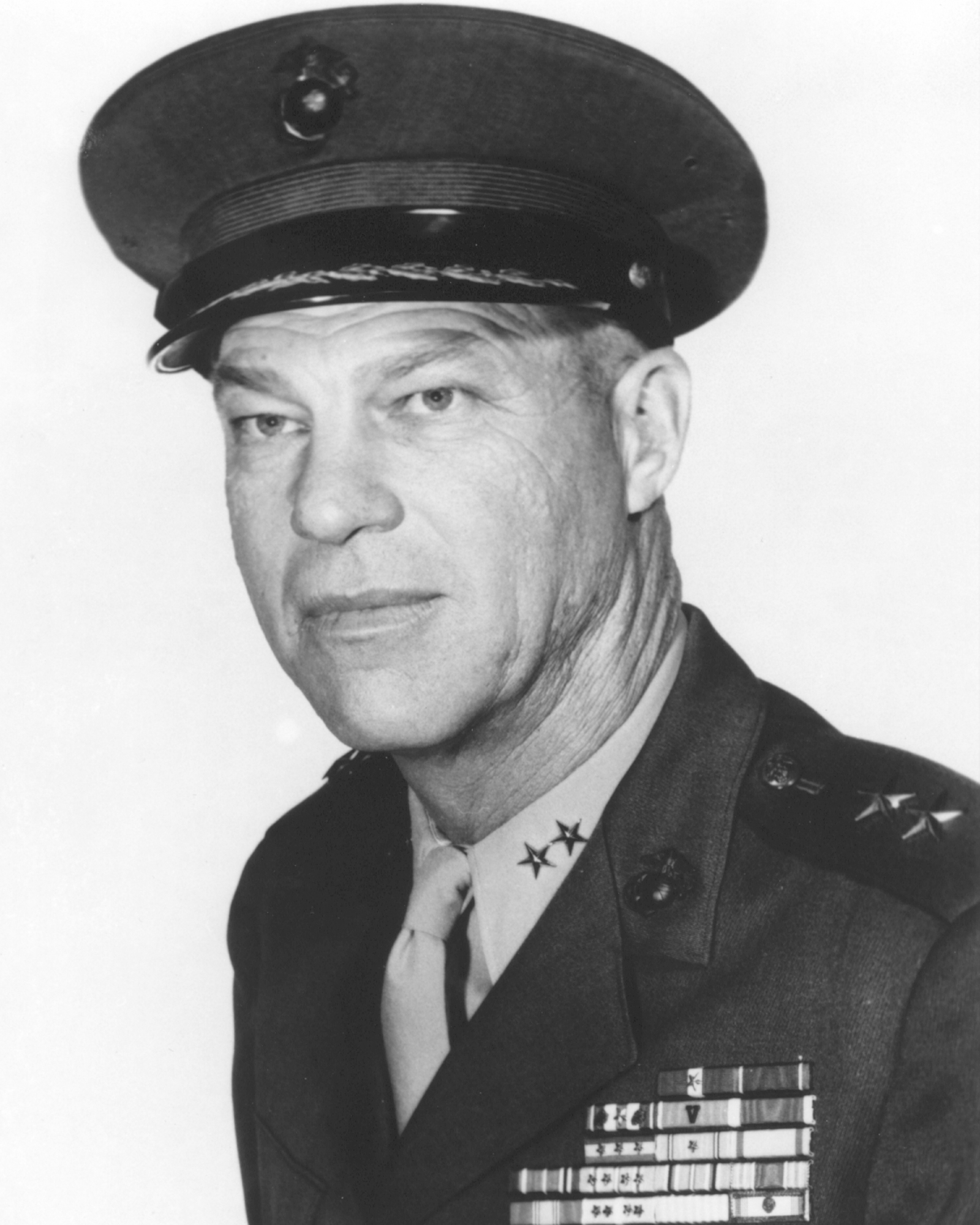
- Born: January 30, 1913; Los Angeles, California, US
- Died: November 11, 2004 (aged 91); Encinitas, California, US
- Military career
- Allegiance: United States
- Branch: United States Marine Corps
- Service years: 1935–1968
- Rank: Major general
- Commands: 2nd Battalion 6th Marines; 3rd Marine Regiment; 5th Marine Regiment; Basic School; 1st Infantry Training Regiment; Camp Pendleton; MCRD Parris Island
- Conflicts: World War II; Battle of Guadalcanal; Battle of Tarawa; Battle of Saipan; Korean War; Battle of Inchon; Second Battle of Seoul; Battle of Chosin Reservoir; Vietnam War
- Awards: Navy Cross (2); Distinguished Service Cross; Silver Star (4); Legion of Merit (2); Purple Heart

Major General Raymond Leroy Murray (January 30, 1913 – November 11, 2004) was a highly decorated United States Marine Corps officer who earned two Navy Crosses, one during World War II and a second during the Korean War. He retired from active duty on August 1, 1968.

As a lieutenant colonel on Saipan during World War II, General Murray was awarded his first Navy Cross for extraordinary heroism under fire, June 15, 1944, while commanding the 2nd Battalion 6th Marines, 2nd Marine Division. He was the inspiration for the battalion commander in Leon Uris's 1953 novel Battle Cry. During the Korean War, he was twice again cited for extraordinary heroism, earning the Army Distinguished Service Cross during the period of November 29 to December 4, 1950, and a second Navy Cross on December 6 and 7, 1950, as commander of the 5th Marines, 1st Marine Division (Reinforced).

== Marine Corps career ==
=== Early years ===
On July 9, 1935, following graduation from Texas A&M College, he accepted his commission as a Marine second lieutenant.

After completing the Basic School at the Philadelphia Navy Yard in March 1936, Lieutenant Murray joined the 2nd Marine Brigade in San Diego, California. Embarking with the brigade for China in September 1937, he served for a short time with the 2nd Battalion in Shanghai. In January 1938, he joined the Marine detachment at the American Embassy in Peiking. He was promoted to first lieutenant in August 1938. Upon his return to San Diego in September 1940, he again saw duty with the 2nd Brigade.

While there, he was promoted to captain in March 1941. That May, Captain Murray sailed for duty in Iceland with the 6th Marines (Reinforced), 1st Provisional Marine Brigade.

He later graduated from the British Force Tactical School. After the brigade was disbanded, he returned to San Diego in April 1942, and the following month was promoted to major.

=== World War II ===
In October 1942, Major Murray embarked with the 6th Marines for the Pacific theatre. For conspicuous gallantry on Guadalcanal in January 1943, as commander of the 2nd Battalion 6th Marines, he was awarded his first Silver Star. He was promoted to lieutenant colonel in June 1943. Lieutenant Colonel Murray was awarded a second Silver Star Medal for conspicuous gallantry while commanding the same unit on Tarawa in November 1943. Serving in this same capacity on Saipan, his heroism in remaining at his post although seriously wounded and continuing to direct his battalion during the initial assault, earned him his first Navy Cross on June 15, 1944.

Returning to the United States in August 1944, Lieutenant Colonel Murray entered the Command and Staff School at Quantico the following month. After brief duty as an instructor, he was named assistant chief of staff, G-3, 1st Special Marine Brigade, moving with the brigade to Camp Lejeune, North Carolina, in February 1946. In October 1946, he departed for duty in the Pacific area as deputy chief of staff, Headquarters Marine Garrison Forces, Pacific, and the following April was named Inspector of Marine Garrison Forces.

He returned to Quantico in July 1948 for temporary duty on the Marine Corps Board at Marine Corps Schools. Transferred to Camp Pendleton, California in January 1949, Lieutenant Colonel Murray served consecutively as assistant chief of staff, G-4; as commanding officer, 3rd Marine Regiment; and as executive officer, 5th Marine Regiment, 1st Marine Division.

=== Korean War ===
In July 1950, when the 1st Provisional Marine Brigade was formed for duty in Korea, he was ordered overseas with the 5th Marine Regiment, which was to be the nucleus for the brigade. As commanding officer, 5th Marines, he was awarded his third and fourth Silver Star Medals (Army) and the Legion of Merit during action in August and September 1950.

With his unit, he participated in the battles of the Naktong River perimeter, Wolmi-Inchon, Seoul and Wonsan; and in the Marine advance north toward the Yalu River. He was subsequently awarded the Army Distinguished Service Cross for extraordinary heroism in the 1st Division's historic breakout from the Chosin Reservoir area to the sea at Hamhung, and two days later took part in the action which earned him his second Navy Cross. Shortly afterward, with his regiment committed to fighting on the Central Korean front, he was advanced to the rank of colonel, in January 1951.

=== Post-war years ===
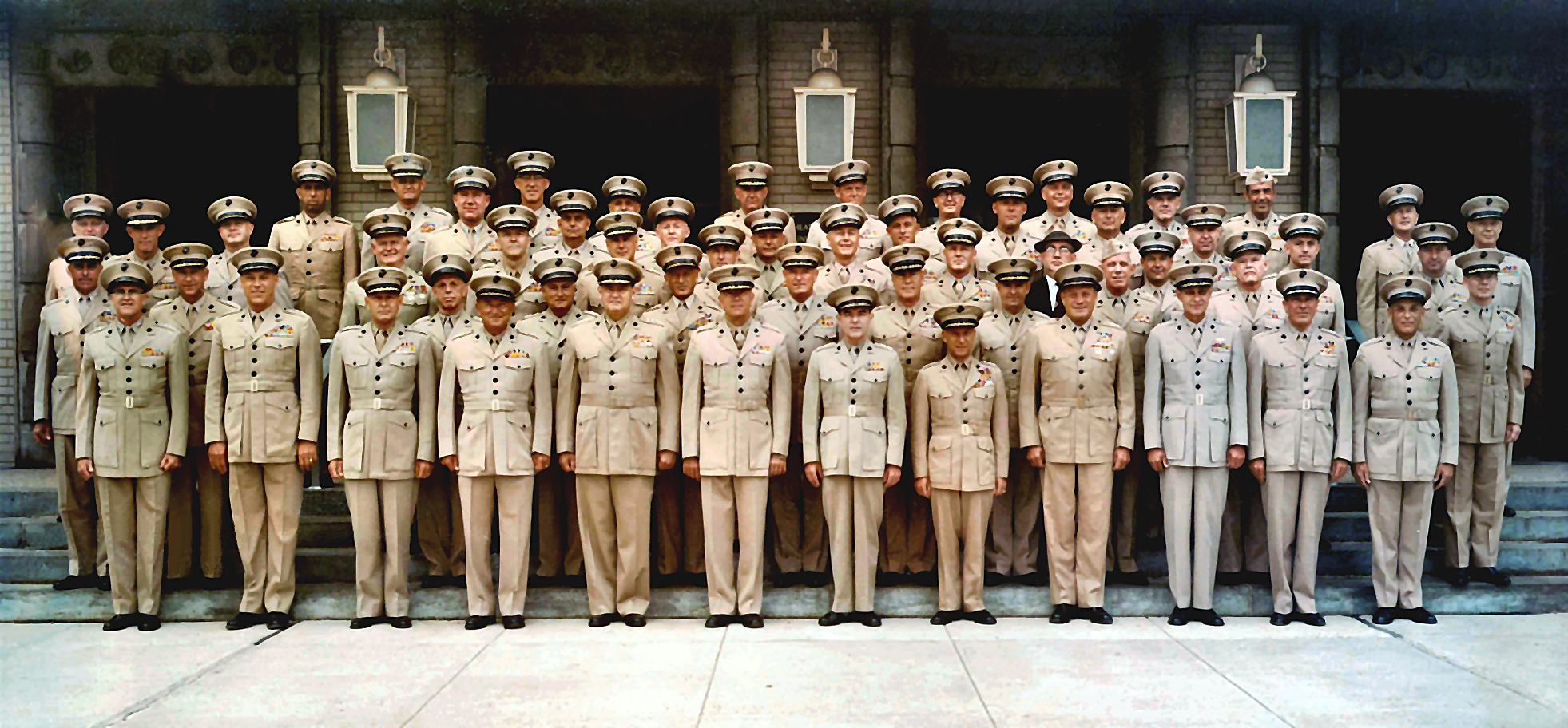
Murray (2nd from left, front row) at the 1967 General Officers Symposium

Following his return from Korea, Colonel Murray served from May until August 1951 at Headquarters Marine Corps, Washington, D. C., then entered the National War College. On completing the course in June 1952, he saw two years duty as commanding officer, The Basic School, Marine Corps Schools, Quantico. In July 1954, he was ordered to the Marine Corps Base, Camp Pendleton.

Colonel Murray remained at Camp Pendleton four years, serving first as commanding officer, 1st Infantry Training Regiment, until February 1955; then as chief of staff of the Marine Corps Base, until July 1957. During his final year there, he was assigned to the 1st Marine Division, serving as Division Inspector, chief of staff, and assistant chief of staff, respectively. In July 1958, he assumed duties as chief of staff, Marine Corps Base, Camp Lejeune. He was promoted to brigadier general in June 1959.

General Murray departed for Okinawa, Japan, in July 1959, assuming duties as assistant division commander, 3rd Marine Division, in August 1959. In July 1960, he reported to Camp Pendleton, as Deputy Base Commander, and subsequently, in March 1961, became commanding general of the Marine Corps Base, Camp Pendleton. He served in the latter capacity until June 1962. On July 1, 1962, he began a two-year assignment as commanding general, Marine Corps Recruit Depot Parris Island. While serving in this capacity, he was promoted to major general on February 1, 1963.

Transferred to Headquarters Marine Corps in June 1964, General Murray was assigned as Inspector General of the Marine Corps. In August 1966, he assumed duties as assistant chief of staff, C-3. Detached from Headquarters in September 1967, he reported to the Far East the following month and began his last tour of active duty as deputy commander, III Marine Amphibious Force in South Vietnam. He returned to the United States in February 1968 and entered the U.S. Naval Hospital at Bethesda, Maryland, where he remained until he retired from active duty on August l, 1968.

Murray was active in the Marine Corps Oral History Program and received a Certificate of Appreciation from the commandant of the Marine Corps, Paul X. Kelley in June 1986. He died in 2004 and was buried in Oceanside's Mission San Luis Rey Cemetery.

== Awards and honors ==

1st Row	Navy Cross with one award star		Distinguished Service Cross		Silver Star with one award star & 2 oak leaf clusters
2nd Row	Legion of Merit with Combat "V" and Gold Star	Purple Heart	Navy Presidential Unit Citation with three service stars	China Service Medal	
3rd Row	American Defense Service Medal with Base clasp	American Campaign Medal	European-African-Middle Eastern Campaign Medal	Asiatic-Pacific Campaign Medal with four service stars	
4th Row	World War II Victory Medal	National Defense Service Medal with one service star	Korean Service Medal with four service stars	Vietnam Service Medal with one service star	
5th Row	Order of Military Merit, Eulji Cordon Medal	Korean Presidential Unit Citation with two service stars	United Nations Korea Medal	Vietnam Campaign Medal	

In 2007 a continuation high school was named after him as Major General Raymond Murray High School.

=== First Navy Cross citation ===
Citation:

The President of the United States of America takes pleasure in presenting the Navy Cross to Lieutenant Colonel Raymond Leroy Murray (MCSN: 0-5127), United States Marine Corps, for extraordinary heroism as Commanding Officer of the Second Battalion, Sixth Marines, SECOND Marine Division, in action against enemy Japanese forces during the assault on Saipan, Marianas Islands, on 15 June 1944. Although sustaining two severe and painful wounds which necessitated his crawling from place to place during the initial stages of the landing, Lieutenant Colonel Murray refused to be evacuated and continued to direct the operations of his Battalion until his condition became so serious from pain and loss of blood that he was ordered to return aboard ship by the Regimental Commander. By remaining at his post, seriously wounded though he was, during the initial and crucial stages of the assault, Lieutenant Colonel Murray set a fine example for his officers and men and aided materially in overcoming the handicaps resulting from the heavy initial casualties, thereby contributing materially to the success of the operations. His outstanding courage, determination and devotion to duty were in keeping with the highest traditions of the United States Naval Service.

=== Second Navy Cross citation ===
Citation:

The President of the United States of America takes pleasure in presenting a Gold Star in lieu of a Second Award of the Navy Cross to Lieutenant Colonel Raymond Leroy Murray (MCSN: 0-5127), United States Marine Corps, for extraordinary heroism in connection with military operations against an armed enemy of the United Nations while serving as Commanding Officer of the Fifth Marines, FIRST Marine Division (Reinforced), in action against enemy aggressor forces in the Republic of Korea on 6 and 7 December 1950. Charged with the tremendous responsibility of taking over the perimeter defense of Hagaru-ri, and subsequently pressing the attack to Koto-ri in conjunction with another Marine regiment, (the then) Lieutenant Colonel Murray, with his ranks depleted by casualties and all his officers and men exhausted from several days of fierce fighting in sub-zero temperatures, launched vigorous attacks to the eastward to seize a vital enemy-held ridge and consolidate his positions. Affording protection for the airstrip where approximately one thousand vehicles containing division supplies, ammunition and equipment were assembled, he remained until all the wounded had been evacuated. Before directing his regiment in forming a rear guard for the entire column. Throughout the night, he beat of vicious onslaughts continuously launched by the enemy and, on the following morning, carried out a brilliantly executed counterattack, taking two hundred prisoners and leaving an ineffective and decimated enemy in his wake as he continued on to his destination, arriving that evening with units intact and ready to continue the attack to the south. By his great personal valor, daring combat tactics and superb leadership throughout this bitter offensive and defensive action, Lieutenant Colonel Murray served as a constant inspiration to his regiment in completing this extremely hazardous mission against tremendous odds, and his courageous devotion to duty reflects the highest credit upon himself, his gallant officers and men, and the United States Naval Service.

=== Distinguished Service Cross citation ===
Citation:

The President of the United States of America, under the provisions of the Act of Congress approved July 9, 1918, takes pleasure in presenting the Distinguished Service Cross to Lieutenant Colonel Raymond Leroy Murray (MCSN: 0-5127), United States Marine Corps, for extraordinary heroism in connection with military operations against an armed enemy of the United Nations while Commanding the Fifth Marines, FIRST Marine Division (Reinforced), in action against enemy aggressor forces in Korea from 29 November to 4 December 1950. Charged with the tremendous responsibility of taking over the perimeter defense of Hagaru-ri, and subsequently pressing the attack to Koto-Ri in conjunction with another Marine regiment, (the then) Lieutenant Colonel Murray, with his ranks depleted by casualties and all his officers and men exhausted from several days of fierce fighting in sub-zero temperatures, launched vigorous attacks to the eastward to seize a vital enemy-held ridge and consolidate his positions. Affording protection for the airstrip where approximately one thousand vehicles containing division supplies, ammunition and equipment were assembled, he remained until all the wounded had been evacuated before directing his regiment in forming a rear guard for the entire column. Throughout the night, he beat of vicious onslaughts continuously launched by the enemy and, on the following morning, carried out a brilliantly executed counterattack, taking two hundred prisoners and leaving an ineffective and decimated enemy in his wake as he continued on to his destination, arriving that evening with units intact and ready to continue the attack to the south which contributed materially to the successful breakthrough of United Nations Forces in the Chosin Reservoir area and are in keeping with the highest traditions of the military service.

=== First Silver Star citation ===
Citation:

The President of the United States of America takes pleasure in presenting the Silver Star to Major Raymond Leroy Murray (MCSN: 0-5127), United States Marine Corps, for conspicuous gallantry and intrepidity as Commanding Officer of the Second Battalion, Sixth Marines (Reinforced), in action against enemy Japanese forces on Guadalcanal Island, Solomon Islands, 26 January 1943. When his battalion, maneuvering into a position in the vicinity of the Pha River and the Coast Road, suddenly encountered withering fire from an enemy strong point, Major Murray, with inspiring leadership and utter disregard for his own personal safety, directed the hazardous advance of his troops to their post and committed them to action. During the remainder of the day and night he was constantly in the most exposed front lines, despite hostile fire from the trees and concealed foxholes, and, through his splendid courage and excellent tactical skill, his command was responsible for the complete destruction or forced retreat of the enemy. Major Murray's heroic conduct and valiant devotion to duty contributed greatly to the success of this vital mission and were in keeping with the highest traditions of the United States Naval Service.

=== Second Silver Star citation ===
Citation:

The President of the United States of America takes pleasure in presenting a Gold Star in lieu of a Second Award of the Silver Star to Lieutenant Colonel Raymond Leroy Murray (MCSN: 0-5127), United States Marine Corps, for conspicuous gallantry and intrepidity as Commanding Officer of the Second Battalion, Sixth Marines, SECOND Marine Division, during action against enemy Japanese forces at Tarawa Atoll, Gilbert Islands, from 24 to 28 November 1943. Landing his battalion on a separate island to prevent the enemy from escaping from the eastern end of Betio, then under attack by our forces, Lieutenant Colonel Murray fearlessly countered strong hostile resistance when the island was later secured to lead his men in determined attacks against the fanatic Japanese, forcing them to fall back from one island to another until they were destroyed and the Atoll seized and occupied. By his forceful leadership, his valiant fighting spirit and dauntless courage under fire, Lieutenant Colonel Murray served as an inspiration to his command during the fierce hostilities and contributed materially to the success of our sustained drive against the Japanese in the Pacific War Area. His unwavering devotion to duty throughout was in keeping with the highest traditions of the United States Naval Service.

=== Third Silver Star citation ===
Citation:

The President of the United States of America, authorized by Act of Congress July 9, 1918, takes pleasure in presenting a Bronze Oak Leaf Cluster in addition to a previously awarded Gold Star in lieu of a Third Award of the Silver Star (Army Award) to Lieutenant Colonel Raymond Leroy Murray (MCSN: 0-5127), United States Marine Corps, for conspicuous gallantry and intrepidity while commanding the Fifth Marines, FIRST Marine Division (Reinforced), in action against enemy aggressor forces in the amphibious landing resulting in the capture of Inchon, Korea, on 15 September 1950 in the Inchon-Seoul operation. His actions contributed materially to the success of this operation and were in keeping with the highest traditions of the military service.

=== Fourth Silver Star citation ===
Citation:

The President of the United States of America, authorized by Act of Congress July 9, 1918, takes pleasure in presenting a Second Bronze Oak Leaf Cluster in addition to a previously awarded Gold Star in lieu of a Fourth Award of the Silver Star (Army Award) to Lieutenant Colonel Raymond Leroy Murray (MCSN: 0-5127), United States Marine Corps, for conspicuous gallantry and intrepidity in action against an armed enemy of the United Nations in Korea during the period 3 August to 6 September 1950. While serving as Commanding Officer of the Fifth Marine Regiment, FIRST Marine Division (Reinforced), Colonel Murray displayed exceptional ability in directing the operations of his regiment against organized enemy resistance of superior strength. With complete disregard for his own safety, Colonel Murray made numerous visits to forward elements of his assault battalions to obtain first hand information necessary for sound tactical judgment in the employment of his regiment. On 11 August, as the regiment was advancing along the road to Sachon, it was halted by heavy enemy fire directed from well concealed emplacements on high ground overlooking the route of movement. Moving up to the front, constantly exposed to enemy small arms fire, Colonel Murray personally directed the tactical employment of his troops until the situation became stabilized. His cool and positive control of the command, fearless determination, and indomitable courage were an inspirational propellant for his valiantly fighting men and furthered the United Nations campaign for peace. Colonel Murray, through his valor and notable proficiency as a combat commander, reflects great credit on himself and the military service.

== See also ==
- Battle of Chosin Reservoir

== Autobiography ==
- Murray, Raymond L. (2009). Highpockets, the man, the Marine, the legend : an autobiography of Major General Raymond L. Murray (arranged, researched and written by Zona Gayle Murray). San Diego: Direct2Press.com. ISBN 978-0-578-03549-9.
