= A God in Ruins =

A God in Ruins may refer to:

- A God in Ruins (Atkinson novel), a 2015 novel by Kate Atkinson
- A God in Ruins (Uris novel), a 1999 novel by Leon Uris
