= Lillicrap =

Lillicrap is a surname. Notable people with the surname include:

- Cameron Lillicrap (born 1963), Australian international rugby union player
- Charles Lillicrap (1887–1966), British naval architect
- Christopher Lillicrap (born 1949), British television presenter, writer and composer
- James Lillicrap (d. 1851), British Royal Navy officer
- John Lillicrap (1866–1937), New Zealand politician
- Siwan Lillicrap (born 1987), Welsh international rugby union player
- Timothy Lillicrap, Canadian neuroscientist and AI researcher
