= La Salle Secondary School =

High school in Kingston, Ontario, Canada

- School Logo

Location
- Kingston, Ontario, K7L 5H6; Canada; 44.272°N 76.406°W

Information
- School type: Secondary
- Motto: Facite Omnia Bene (Do all things well)
- Founded: 1966
- School board: Limestone District School Board
- School number: 12
- Principal: Jen Grasse
- Grades: 7-12
- Language: English
- Area: Former Pittsburgh Township
- Colours: Black and Gold
- Mascot: Black Knight
- Team name: Black Knights
- Website: lasalle.limestone.on.ca

La Salle Secondary School is a high school located in Kingston, Ontario, Canada. La Salle is a medium-sized school, consisting of an average student count of 700. The school schedule is composed of four courses and MSIP. The student body is predominantly composed of students from the adjacent suburbs, the military base, as well as many rural communities located along or near Highway 2, and Highway 15.

== Daily schedule ==
The four courses are the same as any public high school in the Kingston region, with the exception of lasting an hour compared to the usual hour and fifteen minutes. The fifteen minutes from each class is added on to MSIP (Multi-Subject Instructional Period). This creates the five period day. This class is meant as an extra hour to work on class work, talk to teachers and allow students to interact with students from different grades.

== Athletics ==
La Salle's team colours are black and gold. Their athletic teams are all known as the "Black Knights". The school competes in many sports including cross-country, soccer, hockey, rugby, football, basketball, cheerleading, curling, field hockey, badminton, skiing, skateboarding, and tennis. La Salle Secondary School is a AA-level school, a designation determined by enrollment levels. This creates a disadvantage in athletics; however their senior girls' basketball team won KASSAA in 2007 and 2008, and won the EOSSAA AA championship in 2008–2013.

Their Senior boys' rugby team has also been very competitive, winning KASSAA, going undefeated for three straight seasons in 1999, 2000, 2001 also in 2013, also winning back to back years in 2007 and 2008, and winning AA EOSSAA in 2006, 2007, and 2008. The Senior boys' football team has been the Kingston AA representative in provincials for the past couple of years, with their best finish coming in 2008 in the EOSSAA final, before losing to a strong Gananoque Trojan team. The sir team in the 2010s found great success in the second half with a 2016 kassaa championship win over the frontenac falcons and they followed that up with AA EOSSAA championship and a AA ofsaa national capital bowl championship. The Jr Football team had quite a run in 2011 as the league switched to AA/AAA format meaning the AA football teams have their own Championship which the JR Black Knights won becoming the first KASSAA AA jr football champions. They ended up in the EOSSAA final where they lost to the defspe crer was hereending AA OFSAA champion St Mary's Crusaders 16 - 9. In 2014 the jr black knights won Eossaa and the Aa national capital bowl.

The LaSalle Black Knights play all of their home Football games on Berk Brean Field. Named after former head coach Berkeley Brean, who coached Football and Rugby at the school in the 1980s and 1990s.

== Notable alumni ==
- Timothy Lillicrap, Canadian neuroscientist and AI researcher
- Matt McQuillan, professional golfer
- Taylor Robertson, CFL retired player
- Matt Kirk, CFL retired player
- Jay McClement, NHL player
- Bryan Allen, NHL player
- Doug Falconer, CFL retired player
- Karl Pruner actor
- Tye Kartye, NHL player

== See also ==
- Education in Ontario
- List of secondary schools in Ontario
