= Doug Falconer (Canadian football) =

Canadian football player (1952–2021)

- Falconer in 1985

No. 33
- Position: Defensive back

Personal information
- Born: January 30, 1952; Calgary, Alberta, Canada
- Died: July 25, 2021 (aged 69); Kingston, Ontario, Canada

Career information
- High school: Base Borden Collegiate, LaSalle Secondary
- College: University of Ottawa
- CFL draft: 1976: 6th round, 46th overall pick

Career history
- 1976: Toronto Argonauts
- 1976: Hamilton Tiger-Cats
- 1976: Ottawa Rough Riders
- 1977–1978: Calgary Stampeders
- 1979: Saskatchewan Roughriders
- 1979: Montreal Alouettes

Awards and highlights
- Vanier Cup champion (1975); Central Bowl champion (1975); Yates Cup Champion (1975); CFL Grey Cup Champion (1976); Ottawa Sports Hall of Fame (2015); University of Ottawa Football Hall of Fame (2015); NHL Breakout World Championship of Inline Hockey (1998)

Doug Falconer (January 30, 1952 – July 25, 2021) was a Canadian-American film producer, singer-songwriter, recording artist and professional Canadian football player, having played in the Canadian Football League (CFL).

== Early life ==
Falconer was born in Calgary, Alberta. His father was a member of the Canadian Armed Forces. Growing up, Falconer was constantly on the move. After attending no less than five public schools across Canada, Falconer split his high school years between Base Borden Collegiate Institute in Borden, Ontario outside of Toronto and then La Salle Secondary School in Kingston, Ontario.

While attending high school, Falconer was a four-sport star. He participated in football, basketball, track and field athletics and soccer. In his senior year at La Salle, Falconer scored 42 points in the Eastern Ontario Secondary School Basketball Championship game in a 33-point come-from-behind win. He was the city's scoring champion in both basketball and football. He was also the city's long jump and high jump champion that same year.

Following high school, Falconer went on to play basketball at St. Lawrence College where he played at the guard position. Falconer was a member of the 1971–72 St. Lawrence College O.C.A.A. Eastern Division Championship team.

In 1973, Falconer transferred to the University of Ottawa where he played as a wide receiver and as a defensive back on the football team. He once scored two touchdowns as a wide receiver against McGill University and intercepted 2 passes as a defensive back against the University of Windsor in the 1975 Churchill Bowl. Falconer was a member of the legendary 1975 National Championship Vanier Cup Team.

In 1976, the prestigious "Achievement Award" in recognition of Distinguished Performance in the Field of Amateur Sports was presented to Falconer by the Premier of Ontario, William Davis.

== Professional career ==
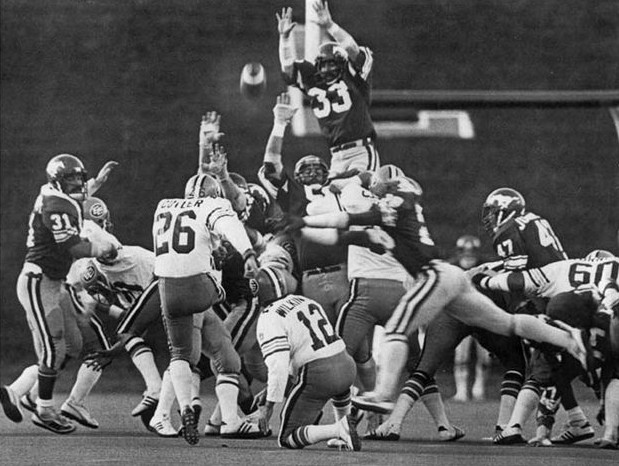
Falconer (No. 33) attempts to block Dave Cutler's field goal.

Following his university career, Falconer went on to play professional football in the Canadian Football League in 1976 with the Ottawa Rough Riders (8 games), the Toronto Argonauts (2 games) and the Hamilton Tiger-Cats (3 games). He was a member of the 64th Grey Cup champion Ottawa Rough Riders. In 1976 during the Rough Riders' run to the Grey Cup Championship against the Toronto Argonauts Falconer intercepted a Chuck Ealey pass in the end zone late in the game to prevent a winning drive. He did it again against the Montreal Alouettes. This time he picked off a Sonny Wade pass in the end zone late in the fourth quarter to help secure the win for the Rough Riders. He played for the Calgary Stampeders for 2 seasons (32 games) and in 1978 against the Winnipeg Blue Bombers he intercepted a Ralph Brock pass late in the fourth quarter and returned it 35 yards for the winning touchdown in a game that secured the Stampeders a playoff berth. In 1979, he played 2 games apiece for the Saskatchewan Roughriders and Montreal Alouettes.

== Post-football ==
Falconer moved to Los Angeles in 1981 where he helped pioneer the sport of inline hockey in California. In 1998 at the age of 47 he was captain of the NHL Breakout World Championship team, competing against teams from around the world including Canada, Sweden and USA. The Championship Trophy was awarded to Falconer and his teammates by Willie O'Ree. He died on July 25, 2021, in Kingston, Ontario, at the age of 69.

== University of Ottawa Gilbert-Fraser-Morrison Scholarship ==
In 2008, Falconer established the University of Ottawa Gee Gees football teams’ first ever entrance scholarship. The scholarship has been named after the three coaches who were an inspiration to Falconer through High School and University. They are Don Gilbert, Falconer's head football coach at the University of Ottawa, Doug Fraser and Bob Morrison, Falconer's basketball and football coaches at La Salle Secondary in Kingston. The Gilbert-Fraser-Morrison Scholarship is awarded annually to a LaSalle Secondary School and/or a Kingston area high school student athlete planning to attend and play football at the University of Ottawa.

== University of Ottawa Football Hall of Fame ==
In 2015, Falconer was inducted into the University of Ottawa Football Hall of Fame as a member of the 1975 undefeated National Champion University of Ottawa Gee Gees football team.

== City of Ottawa Sports Hall of Fame ==
In 2015, Falconer was inducted into the City of Ottawa Sports Hall of Fame as a member of the 1975 undefeated National Champion University of Ottawa Gee Gees football team.

== Falconer Pictures ==
Falconer was Chairman of Falconer Pictures, a feature film and TV production company in Los Angeles. In 2009, Falconer executive produced My Bollywood Bride starring Sex and the City's Jason Lewis. In 2011, Falconer was executive producer on the epic film The Warrior's Way starring Oscar winner Geoffrey Rush and Kate Bosworth and produced by Oscar winner Barrie M. Osborne (The Lord of the Rings). In 2015, Falconer was executive producer on critically acclaimed western Forsaken starring Kiefer Sutherland, Donald Sutherland, Demi Moore and Brian Cox. Forsaken was an Official Selection at the 2015 Toronto International Film Festival (TIFF). Forsaken was nominated for five 2016 Canadian Screen Awards.

Falconer's other producer credits include the 2016 film Ace the Case starring Oscar winner Susan Sarandon and the 2017 film Humanity Bureau starring Oscar winner Nicolas Cage. Falconer also produced the 2019 action thriller Daughter of the Wolf starring Gina Carano (Haywire, Deadpool, Fast & Furious 6) and Oscar winner Richard Dreyfuss (Jaws, Close Encounters of the Third Kind, The Goodbye Girl). Daughter of the Wolf was nominated for three 2020 Canadian Screen Award nominations including Best TV Movie. In 2020, Falconer co-produced the feature film Endless along with Thunder Road Pictures (A Star is Born, John Wick) and Mind's Eye Entertainment (Forsaken, The Tall Man). Falconer also produced the suspense thriller Dangerous starring Oscar winner Mel Gibson (Braveheart), Scott Eastwood, Famke Janssen and Tyrese Gibson. Falconer Pictures' film Wander, a southwestern suspense thriller starring Aaron Eckhart, Oscar winner Tommy Lee Jones, Katheryn Winnick and Heather Graham was released on December 4, 2020.

Films in development before Falconer's death included Stan Lee's Annihilator, written by Dan Gilroy (The Bourne Legacy), Why Should White Guys Have All the Fun?, a Reginald Lewis biopic starring Jamie Foxx, The 500, written by Angelo Pizzo (Rudy, Hoosiers) and The Magician, a Marlin Briscoe biopic, written by Gregory Allen Howard (Ali, Remember the Titans).
