= The Angry Hills (film) =

1959 film by Robert Aldrich

- Directed by: Robert Aldrich
- Written by: A. I. Bezzerides
- Based on: The Angry Hills; 1955 novel by Leon Uris
- Produced by: Raymond Stross
- Starring: Robert Mitchum; Stanley Baker; Elisabeth Müller
- Cinematography: Stephen Dade
- Edited by: Peter Tanner
- Music by: Richard Rodney Bennett
- Production company: Raymond Productions
- Distributed by: Metro-Goldwyn-Mayer
- Release date: 29 July 1959
- Running time: 105 minutes
- Countries: United Kingdom; United States
- Language: English
- Budget: $1,190,000
- Box office: $1,285,000

The Angry Hills is a 1959 American-British war film directed by Robert Aldrich and starring Robert Mitchum, Stanley Baker and Elisabeth Müller. It is based on the novel by Leon Uris.

== Plot ==
Set in Greece in 1941, before and after the Axis invasion, the film follows an American journalist who possesses a list of Greek resistance leaders. Having memorized the list he destroys it and is then pursued by various groups of people keen to have it: Communist resistance fighters, the Gestapo and Greek collaborators.

== Cast ==
- Robert Mitchum as Michael Morrison
- Stanley Baker as Konrad Heisler
- Elisabeth Mueller as Lisa Kyriakides
- Gia Scala as Eleftheria
- Theodore Bikel as Dimitrius Tassos
- Sebastian Cabot as Chesney
- Peter Illing as Leonidas
- Leslie Phillips as Ray Taylor
- Donald Wolfit as Dr. Stergiou
- Marius Goring as Cmdr. Eric Oberg
- Jackie Lane as Maria Tassos
- Kieron Moore as Andreas
- George Pastell as Papa Panos
- Patrick Jordan as Bluey Ferguson
- Marita Constantinou as Kleopatra
- Stanley Van Beers as Tavern Proprietor
- George Eugeniou
- Alec Mango as Papa Philibos

== Production ==
Uris' novel was published in 1955. Because of its Greek setting, Uris was hired to write the screenplay for Boy on a Dolphin.

Film rights were bought by Raymond Stross in England, who said he wanted Clark Gable for the lead. Stross eventually set up the film with MGM and New York's Cine World Productions, and announced Robert Mitchum would star. According to Mitchum, Alan Ladd was meant to play the lead but the producers drove out to Ladd's house and met him after "he'd just crawled out of his swimming pool and was all shrunken up like a dishwasher's hand. They decided he wouldn't do for the big war correspondent. So, what happened? Some idiot said, 'Ask Mitchum to play it. That bum will do anything if he has five minutes free.' Well I had five minutes free so I did it."

Pier Angeli was wanted for the female lead. Elizabeth Mueller was cast instead.

Leon Uris did the first draft of the screenplay. However Aldrich had it rewritten by A.I. Bezzerides, who had written Kiss Me Deadly for Aldrich.

The film was shot from June to December 1958 with location shooting in Greece and interiors at MGM-British Studios.

Robert Aldrich had just made Ten Seconds to Hell in Germany. He later recalled:

I stayed to make The Angry Hills for Raymond Stross. He understood that Metro was buying film by the yard then, and Mitchum was reasonably hot. So they thought that as long as it was an hour and a half with Mitchum and some Greek scenery, it would work. Obviously it didn't... The Strosses of this world just hang back there and let you work your ass off, till you're all through, and then say, "Fine. Goody-bye. Thank you, very much." Despite whatever promises about length or final cut they made to you, they take it back then and do what they were going to do in the first place.

== Box office ==
According to MGM records the film earned $510,000 in the US and Canada and $775,000 elsewhere, resulting in a loss of $497,000.

It had admissions of 588,260 in France.

== Legacy ==
Robert Aldrich later said the film was "disappointing not because it's not a good picture but because it could have been good. It had a potential that was never remotely realised... you feel sad about The Angry Hills... I'd know how to make The Angry Hills better in a thousand ways."
