= Billboard year-end top 30 singles of 1955 =

Ranking of recorded music

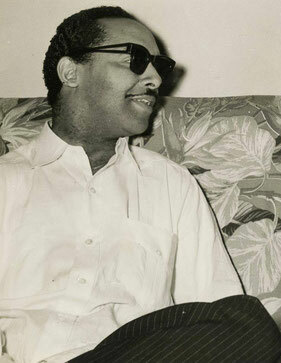
"Cherry Pink And Apple Blossom White" by Perez Prado was the number one song of 1955.

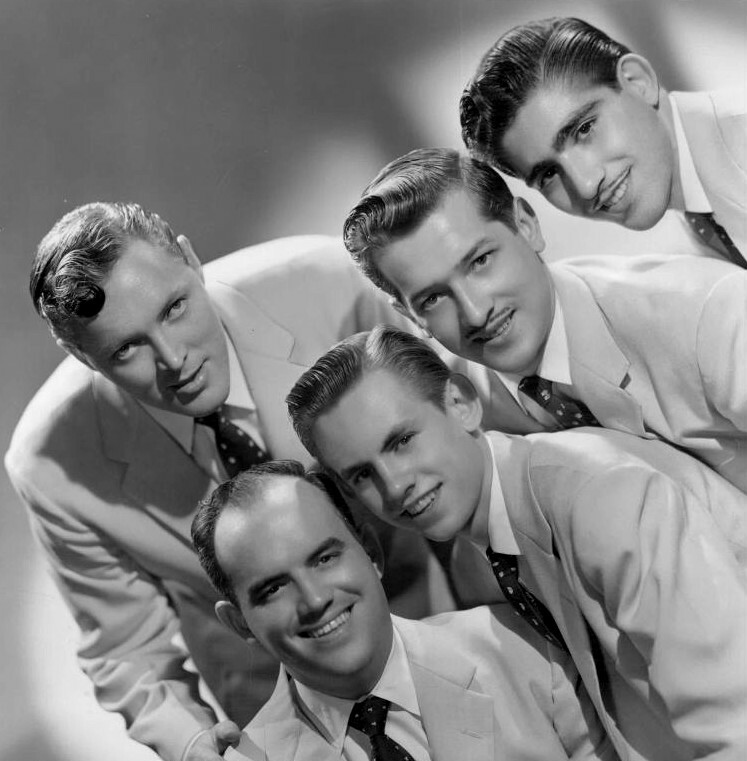
"Rock Around the Clock" by Bill Haley & His Comets was the number two song of 1955, and a breakthrough hit for rock and roll.

This is a list of Billboard magazine's top 30 singles of 1955 according to retail sales.

| No. | Title | Artist(s) |
|---|---|---|
| 1 | "Cherry Pink And Apple Blossom White" | Perez Prado |
| 2 | "Rock Around the Clock" | Bill Haley & His Comets |
| 3 | "The Yellow Rose of Texas" | Mitch Miller |
| 4 | "Autumn Leaves" | Roger Williams |
| 5 | "Unchained Melody" | Les Baxter |
| 6 | "The Ballad of Davy Crockett" | Bill Hayes |
| 7 | "Love Is a Many-Splendored Thing" | The Four Aces |
| 8 | "Sincerely" | The McGuire Sisters |
| 9 | "Ain't That a Shame" | Pat Boone |
| 10 | "The Wallflower (Dance with Me, Henry)" | Georgia Gibbs |
| 11 | "The Crazy Otto Medley" | Johnny Maddox |
| 12 | "Melody of Love" | Billy Vaughn |
| 13 | "Sixteen Tons" | Tennessee Ernie Ford |
| 14 | "Learnin' the Blues" | Frank Sinatra |
| 15 | "Hearts of Stone" | The Fontane Sisters |
| 16 | "Tweedle Dee" | Georgia Gibbs |
| 17 | "Moments to Remember" | The Four Lads |
| 18 | "Mr. Sandman" | The Chordettes |
| 19 | "Let Me Go, Lover!" | Joan Weber |
| 20 | "A Blossom Fell" | Nat King Cole |
| 21 | "Unchained Melody" | Al Hibbler |
| 22 | "The Ballad of Davy Crockett" | Fess Parker |
| 23 | "Honey-Babe" | Art Mooney |
| 24 | "The Ballad of Davy Crockett" | Tennessee Ernie Ford |
| 25 | "Ko Ko Mo (I Love You So)" | Perry Como |
| 26 | "Hard to Get" | Gisele MacKenzie |
| 27 | "The Naughty Lady of Shady Lane" | The Ames Brothers |
| 28 | "That's All I Want from You" | Jaye P. Morgan |
| 29 | "Only You (And You Alone)" | The Platters |
| 30 | "It's a Sin to Tell a Lie" | Somethin' Smith and the Redheads |

== See also ==
- 1955 in music
- List of Billboard number-one singles of 1955
