= 2/6 =

2/6 may refer to:

- 2nd Battalion, 6th Marines
- February 6 (month-day date notation)
- 2 June (day-month date notation)
- Half crown (British coin)
