= Mitla Pass (novel) =

1988 novel by Leon Uris

- First edition (publ. Doubleday)
- Author: Leon Uris
- Publisher: Doubleday
- Publication date: November 1, 1988
- ISBN: 0553282808

Mitla Pass (1988) is a novel written by the American novelist Leon Uris.

Gideon Zadok is an American author who is to follow an airborne team to secure the Mitla Pass during the Suez Crisis and thereby becomes involved in the Mitla incident when Colonel Zechariah (whose real world counterpart is Ariel Sharon) decides to capture it despite other orders. During the course of these events, readers are taken back to previous events from Zadok's marriage, some of his deeds in the US Marine Corps, and also his parents' life and history, which goes from the shtetls of Russia, through their early years in Palestine, and on to Baltimore and the First World War.

The book was an immediate best-seller.

== Critical reaction ==
Kirkus Reviews called it "a big breast-beater of a book about how one man vanquishes the demons devouring his soul. This foray draws heavily on the writer's own life, his experiences in Hollywood, and the Jewish immigrant heritage that by turns drag him down and, when finally confronted, allow him to realize himself." Publishers Weekly said the "sour, self-indulgent characters and surprisingly awkward dialogue suggest that only the staunchest Uris fans will enjoy his new novel."

A New York Times reviewer said that "Readers may find 'Mitla Pass' less satisfying than, say, 'Exodus' or 'Trinity,' but no matter.; the old pro still knows how to spin a yarn."
