= 2nd Battalion, 6th Marines =

2nd Battalion, 6th Marine Regiment
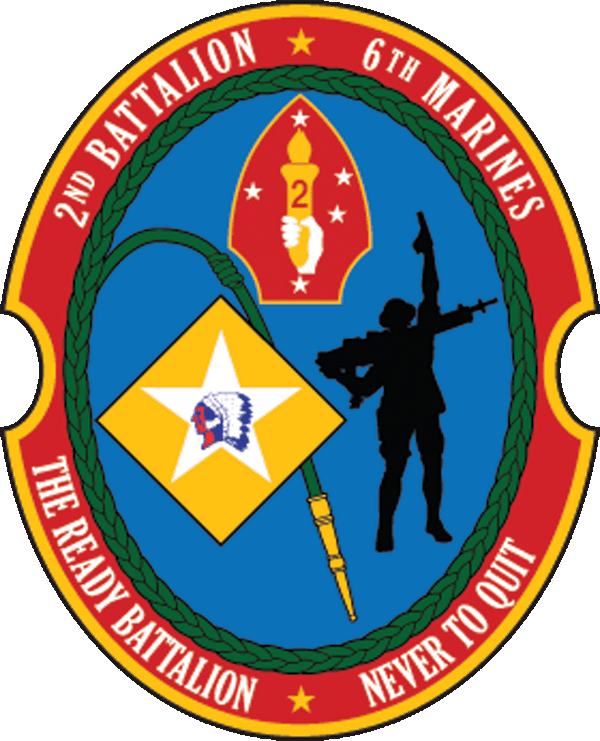
- 2nd Battalion, 6th Marine Regiment insignia
- Active: August 14, 1917 – present
- Country: United States
- Branch: United States Marine Corps
- Type: Infantry battalion
- Role: Locate, close with and destroy the enemy by fire and maneuver
- Part of: 6th Marine Regiment; 2nd Marine Division
- Garrison/HQ: Marine Corps Base Camp Lejeune
- Nicknames: "The Ready Battalion", "Spartans"
- Motto: "Never to Quit"
- Engagements: World War I; Battle of Belleau Wood; Battle of Soissons; Battle of Blanc Mont Ridge; Meuse-Argonne offensive; World War II; Battle of Guadalcanal; Battle of Tarawa; Battle of Saipan; Multinational Force in Lebanon War on terror; Operation Enduring Freedom; Operation Iraqi Freedom; Operation Inherent Resolve

Commanders
- Current commander: LtCol Chase A. Bradford
- Notable commanders: William A. Worton; John R. Allen; Marcus J. Mainz; Ryan B. Cohen

2nd Battalion, 6th Marines (2/6) is an infantry battalion in the United States Marine Corps based out of Camp Lejeune, North Carolina. Also known as "The Ready Battalion" or "2/6 Spartans", it consists of approximately 800 Marines and Sailors and falls under the command of the 6th Marine Regiment and the 2nd Marine Division.

== Subordinate units ==
- Headquarters and Services Company
- Echo Company
- Fox Company
- Golf Company
- Weapons Company

== History ==
=== World War I ===
2nd Battalion, 6th Marines was activated on July 11, 1917, to serve as reinforcements during World War I. On January 19, 1918, the battalion went to League Island, Philadelphia in order to head out to France as part of the 4th Brigade, American Expeditionary Force. The battalion fought at the Battle of Belleau Wood for which they were awarded the Croix de Guerre with Palm from the French government. Beginning October 3, 1918, the 6th Regiment led the offensive to take Blanc Mont Ridge, pushing the Germans out of the Champagne Region of France. In November 1918, 2/6 also took part in the Meuse-Argonne Offensive which was the last major offensive of the war. The battalion returned to Marine Corps Base Quantico on June 19, 1919. They were deactivated shortly thereafter on August 20, 1919.

=== World War II ===
From May to July 1941 2/6 reassigned to the 1st Provisional Marine Brigade and deployed to occupy Reykjavík, Iceland to relieve British forces. In March 1942 the battalion returned to San Diego and was reassigned to the 2nd Marine Division. Lieutenant Colonel William A. Worton served as Battalion Commander at the time.

In the fall of 1942 2/6 sailed to Wellington, New Zealand where it began advanced combat training. This was followed by movement to Guadalcanal on January 1, 1943. The 2/6 also took part in the Battle of Tarawa, beginning on November 21, 1943, the battle's second day.

On June 15, 1944, the battalion landed on Saipan in the Marianas Islands to take part in the Battle of Saipan. Following the end of the war, 2/6 landed at Nagasaki to take part in the Occupation of Japan from September 1945 until July 1946. In August 1946 the battalion relocated to Camp Pendleton, California.

As part of the post war draw down of forces, 2/6 was deactivated on October 1, 1947.

The exploits of the 2/6 were immortalized in the World War II classic novel, "Battle Cry", by Leon Uris. Although the characters were fictional, the movements of the 2/6 were historically accurate and were based on Uris' own experiences in the 2/6 during World War II as a PFC.

=== The 1960s through the 1990s ===
From February to June 1983, 2nd Battalion, 6th Marines became part of the Multinational Peace-Keeping Force in Lebanon and were present during the 1983 United States embassy bombing. They returned on October 23, 1983, as relief for 1st Battalion, 8th Marines after the bombing of the Marine barracks.

On March 3, 1989, 2nd Battalion, 6th Marines was deactivated and placed into a cadre status. 2/6 was reactivated on July 23, 1994, at Cuzco Wells, Guantanamo Bay, Cuba. Then took part in Operation Sea Signal, the security and processing of Haitian migrants. In September of that same year the battalion's main force returned to Guantanamo Bay to provide security for Cuban migrants.

A year later in September 1995 2/6 was sent to support United Nations and NATO peace keeping operations in the former Yugoslavia. From September 1995 to February 1996, 2/6 served as the tactical reserve for Operation Joint Endeavor Implementation Forces (IFOR) and on numerous occasions as the stand-by TRAP force for Operation Deny Flight. For these actions the battalion received the Joint Meritorious Unit Citation.

From April to May 2000, Echo company, Weapons Co and elements of Headquarters and Services' (H&S) Surveillance, Targeting and Acquisition (STA) deployed to Kosovo and took part in Operation Dynamic Response.

=== Global war on terror ===
From February 2002 to August 2002, the battalion was assigned to the 22nd Marine Expeditionary Unit (Special Operations Capable) as the Battalion Landing Team. From February 2003 to May 2003, the entire Battalion deployed to Kuwait to participate in the 2003 invasion of Iraq.

From August 2003 to April 2004, 2/6 deployed to Okinawa, Japan for a UDP, becoming a part of the 4th Marine Regiment. From August 2004 to July 2005, 2/6 became a part of the 4th MEB, acting as the Brigade's Anti-Terrorism Battalion. While in this capacity the battalion deployed Marines and Sailors to guard the American embassies in Baghdad and Kabul. From September 2005 to April 2006, the battalion deployed to Fallujah, Iraq in support of Operation Iraqi Freedom. They operated in the areas around the city of Fallujah as part of Regimental Combat Team 5. From April 2007 through October 2007, the battalion again deployed to Fallujah, Iraq. There they pacified a formerly hostile city through the development of professional local city police.

From August 2008 through March 2009, the battalion was deployed as the ground combat element of the 26th Marine Expeditionary Unit where during that time, they were deployed to the Gulf of Aden off the coast of Somalia to assist in anti piracy operations. On June 12, 2010, the battalion deployed to Marjah, Helmand province, Afghanistan in support of Operation Enduring Freedom. They returned from Marjah, Helmand Province, Afghanistan January 6, 2011. 2nd Battalion 6th Marines deployed to Trek-Nawa, Helmand Province, Afghanistan in support of Operation Enduring Freedom from December 2011 until June 2012.

== Notable veterans ==
- Robert H. Barrow, served 1956-57, later became 27th Commandant of the Marine Corps
- Robert D. Bohn, Major General, USMC. Served as Battalion commander 1964-65.
- Clifton B. Cates, General, USMC. Served with 96th Company, 2nd Battalion during World War I. Later became 19th Commandant of the Marine Corps.
- John P. Condon, Major General, USMC. Served as Machine Gun Platoon leader, Company H in 1936.
- John R Allen is the president of the Brookings Institution, a retired United States Marine Corps four-star general, and former commander of the NATO International Security Assistance Force and U.S. Forces – Afghanistan (USFOR-A).
- Joseph Dunford, current Chairman of the Joint Chiefs of Staff, and former Commandant of the Marine corps, was battalion commander from 1996 to 1998
- Graves B. Erskine, General, USMC. Served with 79th Company, 2nd Battalion during World War I.
- Thomas Holcomb, General, USMC. Commanded 2nd Battalion during World War I. Later became 17th Commandant of the Marine Corps.
- Charles I. Murray, Brigadier General, USMC. Served with 79th Company, 2nd Battalion during World War I.
- Leon Uris, author and screenwriter of Battle Cry
- George D. Webster, Brigadier General, USMC. Commanded the battalion in 1956.
- William A. Worton, Major General, USMC. Served with 79th Company, 2nd Battalion during World War I.
- Daniel Joseph Daly, First Sergeant, USMC. Served as Company First Sergeant with 73rd Company [WWI]

== See also ==
- History of the United States Marine Corps
- List of United States Marine Corps battalions
- Organization of the United States Marine Corps
