= The Haj (novel) =

1984 novel by Leon Uris

- Author: Leon Uris
- Subject: Palestinian–Jewish relations before and after Israel's independence
- Publisher: Doubleday
- Publication date: 1984
- Pages: 566

The Haj is a novel published in 1984 by American author Leon Uris that tells the story of the birth of Israel from the viewpoint of a Palestinian Arab.

"Haj" in the novel's title refers to the pilgrimage to Mecca, which every able-bodied Muslim who can afford to do so is obliged to make at least once in their lifetime. The title is used ironically to depict the title character's "journey to destruction." The book was described by some reviewers as "propaganda."

The Haj was a best-seller, reaching second place in the Publishers Weekly best-seller list for hardcover novels in May 1984.

== Plot summary ==
The book begins in 1922. The title character is Ibrahim, who becomes the chieftain of a fictitious Palestinian village in that year. He is friendly with Gideon Asch, the Haganah leader who watches over the nearby kibbutz. ("He respected a fairness in Gideon that he was not able to practice himself.") But Ibrahim rejects "Gideon's offers of aid and friendship."

In his New York Times review, Anatole Broyard wrote that "The other 'good' Arab character, as Mr. Uris has it, is Dr. Nuri Mudhil, a badly crippled archeologist. He, too, despairs of traditional Arab attitudes. 'We are a people living in hate, despair and darkness,' Mudhil says. 'The Jews are our bridge out of darkness.'''

As depicted in the book, in 1947, in the runup to the Arab-Israel War of 1948, Arab nations spread false rumors of Jewish atrocities to cause mass flight. Kirkus Reviews recounted in its review that in the novel, "the women of Ibrahim's family are raped by rival Arab henchmen. And though the family survives, thanks to Gideon and a 'very sympathetic' Irgun officer, their arrival in Arab territory on the West Bank is greeted by Arab disdain, neglect, cruelty."

The books ends as "Ibrahim slips back into primitivism" and kills his daughter.

== Critical reaction ==
Kirkus Reviews called the book "a crude propaganda novel," and said "the narration is rudimentary, often clumsy; the dialogue is amateurish, riddled with anachronisms; flat little history-lessons are thrown in haphazardly; and there's no real characterization—just illustrations of the defects in Arab culture. In sum: a dreary, ugly lecture/ novel—sure to attract an audience, but likely to embarrass all but the most unthinking Jewish readers."

New York Times reviewer Anatole Broyard wrote that "except for Ibrahim, the haj of the title, his characters here are all one dimensional: the Jews are mostly good, the Arabs and the British mostly bad." Broyard chided the writing style, said that it was "not even good propaganda," and said that "after struggling with the bad writing, the oversimplifications, the heavy bias, the endless round of brutality and betrayals, one is glad to get back to the familiar miseries of real life."

Writing for The Washington Post, Webster Schott called the book "ambitious, demanding, exhaustive, The Haj achieves moments of belief" and that "[Uris'] setting comes to life as part of a system. But the machinery of Uris' novel demands leaps of credulity in his characters while he tries (with success) to make us understand why Jordan is the logical starting point for a settlement in Near East conflicts, why sexual equality in Israel is a political threat to Arab states and why the concept of a Greater Syria has narcotic effects north of Suez."

The Palestinian Research and Educational Center asserted that reviewers agreed that the book was "cheap anti-Palestinian racism parading as literature".
