= Matt Kirk =

Canadian football player (born 1981)

Profile
- Position: Defensive tackle

Personal information
- Born: June 30, 1981 (age 45); Kingston, Ontario, Canada
- Listed height: 6 ft 4 in (1.93 m)
- Listed weight: 250 lb (113 kg)

Career information
- High school: La Salle
- University: Queen's
- CFL draft: 2004: 5th round, 38th overall pick

Career history
- 2005: Ottawa Renegades
- 2006–2008: BC Lions
- 2009–2011: Hamilton Tiger-Cats

Awards and highlights
- Grey Cup champion (2006); 2003, 2004 First Team OUA All-Star; 2003 Second Team All-Canadian; 2003 J. P. Metras Trophy
- Stats at CFL.ca

Matt Kirk (born June 30, 1981) is a Canadian former professional football defensive tackle who played in the Canadian Football League (CFL). He was selected by the Ottawa Renegades in the 2004 CFL draft. He played CIS Football at Queen's.

Kirk also played for the BC Lions and Hamilton Tiger-Cats.

== Early life ==
Kirk was born in Kingston, Ontario, and was an active and talented athlete, playing hockey, rugby, and track and field. His hockey career included being drafted in the 11th round of the 1997 OHL Draft by the Peterborough Petes. His focus would soon change to football though, where he won two high school football championships at La Salle Secondary School both during his Jr Seasons.

Kirk, attended Queen's University studying Sociology/Health and played football for the Queen's Golden Gaels from 2001 to 2004. He started every game at defensive end in 2001 and had 2 sacks. In 2002, Kirk started every game at defensive end. On September 7, 2002, he had 1 sack for a 6-yard loss. In playoff action against the Western Mustangs he had 8 solo tackles. He also recorded Queen's only sack of the Yates Cup game. In 2003, he switched to the defensive tackle position and was named an OUA First Team All-Star. He also earned Canadian Interuniversity Sport Second Team All-Canadian honours and won the J. P. Metras Trophy as the CIS lineman of the year. In 2004, he repeated as an OUA First Team All-Star.

== Professional career ==
Kirk was drafted by the Ottawa Renegades in the fifth round of the 2004 CFL draft and played 13 games of the 2005 CFL season, recording 3 tackles and 13 special teams tackles. He was selected by the BC Lions 14th overall in the second round of the 2006 Ottawa dispersal draft and was also a member of the BC Lions' 94th Grey Cup championship team.

On February 17, 2009, Kirk signed as a free agent with the Hamilton Tiger-Cats.
