= Armageddon: A Novel of Berlin =

1963 novel by Leon Uris

Armageddon
- First edition
- Author: Leon Uris
- Language: English
- Genre: Historical, War novel
- Publisher: Dell Books
- Publication date: 1963
- Publication place: United States
- Media type: Print (Hardback & Paperback)
- Pages: 632 pp (1st Edition)
- ISBN: 0-440-10290-1
- OCLC: 19004169

Armageddon, or Armageddon: A Novel of Berlin, is a 1964 novel by Leon Uris about post-World War II Germany and the Berlin Airlift. The novel starts in London during World War II, and goes through to the Four Power occupation of Berlin and the Soviet blockade by land of the city's western boroughs. The description of the Berlin Airlift is quite vivid as is the inter-action between people of the five nations involved as the three major Western Allies rub along with the Soviet occupiers of East Berlin and East Germany. The book finishes with the end of the airlift but sets the scene for the following 40 years of Cold War.

== Plot ==
The book explains some important consequences of defeating Nazi Germany:

- Division of territory into four zones of occupation including the last minute trading of Saxony and Thuringia by the Western Allies in return for a presence in Berlin (again in four sectors) at the heart of what had been the Third Reich.
- How relationships between British, American, French and Russian individuals at a personal, a military and a political level developed and with Germans at a personal and political level, while De-Nazifying Germans and identifying likely leaders to play their part in the re-building of the city of Berlin from the ruins.
- The effects of the Soviet Blockade of Berlin and the measures taken by US, British and French governments to supply West Berlin from the air. Specific air corridor and flight safety guarantee arrangements from the 1940s were still in place for every western civil flight in & out of Berlin until the early 1990s.

== Characters ==
=== Sean O'Sullivan ===
Sean O'Sullivan, initially a Captain, finally a Lieutenant Colonel in the United States Army, is one of the main characters in the novel. Posted to G-5, the newly formed US military government, he bears an intensive hatred for the Nazis and wider Germans, as his brothers, Liam and Tim, were killed in action during World War Two. Despite his hatred, he is posted as a military governor to a fictional German region, Romabaden, likely part of Bavaria. After serving as governor, he is asked to accompany his superior General Hansen to Berlin though he wishes to complete his studies and become a professor. Following General Hansen, he finds himself working with the Germans there and meets Ernestine Falkstein, niece of the opposing politicians towards Hitler. O'Sullivan is initially icy towards Ernestine due to his hatred of the Nazis though eventually dates her. Towards the end of the novel, it is revealed Ernestine's father Bruno worked for the Nazis and used slave labor and O'Sullivan covered that up, shattering their relationship. O'Sullivan also meets his Soviet counterpart, Igor Karlovy. Initially rivals, they develop a close friendship. Towards the end, O'Sullivan aids Igor to get his mistress over to West Berlin. O'Sullivan finally leaves Berlin, guilty he covered up for Ernestine's father and his friend Dante Arosa, who broke a non-fraternization rule.

=== Eric Hansen ===
Eric Hansen, was a US Army Major General and later full General and the military governor of the United States Zone. He is O'Sullivan's superior and initially disagreed with O'Sullivan over the latter's policy of treating Germans and support for a concertation camp's commandant's wife. Hansen did slowly support O'Sullivan's governing of a German city and made him his aide in Berlin. Hansen's nickname is 'Eric the Red' which reflects his often temper. He encountered the Soviets just after WWI and learnt their mindset quickly. This is reflected in how he liaised with Soviet counterpart, Marshal Popov. Initially not trusting the main pro-West German politician Falkenstein, he formed a close working relationship with Falkenstein. In the novel, Hansen persuaded the US leaders to not give up on Berlin and initiate an airlift. The West Berliners were thus very appreciative of his efforts. Hansen is a fictional portrayal of General Lucius D. Clay.

== See also ==
- Allied-occupied Germany
- The Good German, another novel in the same setting
