= The Angry Hills =

1955 novel by Leon Uris

- First edition
- Author: Leon Uris
- Cover artist: H. Lawrence Hoffman
- Language: English
- Genre: Historical fiction
- Publisher: Random House
- Publication date: 1955
- Publication place: United States
- Media type: Print
- Pages: 249

The Angry Hills (1955) is a novel written by the American novelist Leon Uris. It was adapted into a motion picture by the same name in 1959.

== Plot ==
Set in Greece during World War II, resistance fighters create problems for the German Army during the occupation of Athens.

Michael "Mike" Morrison is an American author and recent widower who is in Greece during World War II to receive an inheritance. When everything is almost finished, the Greek lawyer asks him to take a letter to a friend in London. Soon everything is turned into a living Hell to Morrison as the Germans invade Greece and the letter turns out to be of extreme importance to the resistance movement.

== Adaptation ==
In the movie version, set in Athens, in Piraeus and in village areas, Mike is played by Robert Mitchum, as a journalist. He happens to have met a leading figure of the Hellenic resistance movement years earlier and now that gentleman sees him as the means to get the list of useful Hellenic figures to British Intelligence.

Along the way he joins resistance fighters keen to liberate their nation from Nazi oppression but must also deal with at least one British traitor named Bluey and several Greek traitors or collaborators.
