= Mila 18 =

1961 novel by Leon Uris

- Author: Leon Uris
- Subject: Warsaw Ghetto Uprising during World War II
- Publisher: Doubleday
- Publication date: 1961
- Pages: 539

Mila 18 is a historical novel by Leon Uris set in German-occupied Warsaw, Poland, before and during World War II. Mila 18 debuted at #7 on The New York Times Best Seller list and peaked at #2 in August 1961. Leon Uris's work, based on real events, covers the Nazi occupation of Poland and the atrocities of systematically dehumanising and eliminating the Jewish people of Poland. The name "Mila 18" is taken from the headquarters bunker of Jewish resistance fighters underneath the building at ulica Miła 18 (18 Mila Street, in English, 18 Pleasant Street). (See Miła 18.) The term ghetto takes on a clearer meaning as the courageous Jewish leaders fight a losing battle against not only the Nazis and their henchmen, but also profiteers and collaborators among themselves. Eventually, as the ghetto is reduced to rubble, a few courageous individuals with few weapons and no outside help assume command of ghetto defence, form a makeshift army and make a stand.

== Summary ==
As in many other books by Uris, the story is largely told from the standpoint of a newspaperman; in this case, an American-Italian journalist, Christopher de Monti, who is assigned to Warsaw after covering the Spanish Civil War. Although meant to be a dispassionate and neutral observer, he meets and becomes intimate with both the Nazi hierarchy and the Jews of Warsaw. He has a passionate affair with the wife of one of the Jewish community leaders, while also dealing with prostitutes provided by the Nazis.

As the ghetto is surrounded and reduced to rubble, he throws in his lot with the gallant defenders. He is one of the few survivors and manages to escape with a young woman, Gabriela Rak, who is pregnant with the child of one of the defenders, Andrei Androfski, a former Polish army officer.

=== Characters ===
- Andrei Androfski is a Polish army Ulany Brigade officer, and a Jew. He is hot-headed and several other characters comment that he is best at leading cavalry charges – i.e. hopelessly fighting until the end. He remains in the ghetto after the fall of the bunker at Mila 18 and is presumed dead afterwards.
- Gabriela Rak is Andrei Androfski's girlfriend, although they decide not to marry due to Andrei's Jewish descent. She worked at the American Embassy in Warsaw before the war and at the end of the book was carrying Andrei's child.
- Christopher de Monti is a journalist whose father is Italian and mother is American. While opposed to fascism and being determined to bring out the truth to the world, he does not aid the fighters on the ghetto until he is compelled to enter the ghetto by the Nazi propaganda officer in Poland. He is the only person to know the location of all the ghetto's diaries.
- Alexander Brandel is one of the leaders of the uprising and the father of Wolf Brandel. He started a diary, which was later expanded to 24 volumes by members of the ghetto. Loosely based on Emanuel Ringelblum.
- Wolf Brandel is the son of Alexander and one of the leaders of the uprising. He escapes the ghetto with a handful of survivors including his girlfriend Rachael Bronski. At the end of the book Christopher de Monti writes that Rachael and Wolf are off fighting in another Jewish resistance group.
- Rachael Bronski is the daughter of Paul and Deborah Bronski and the girlfriend of Wolf Brandel. Along with being a talented musician and an excellent soldier she assists Wolf with the command of his part of the army. When the uprising comes to an end Rachael and Wolf escape with a few others out of the sewers and to safety.
- Deborah Bronski is Christopher de Monti's lover and the wife of Paul Bronski. She is also the sister of Andrei Androfski. While Deborah does not feel any love for Paul, especially after he opposes the resistance in the ghetto, she refuses to leave him until he dies. Deborah has two children – Rachael and Stephan Bronski.
- Paul Bronski is the husband of Deborah Bronski and, although a Jew, does not wish to be associated with other Jews in any way. He works at the Jewish Council and believes in cooperating with the Germans and opposing the Jewish resistance. He commits suicide eventually after not being able to cope with the pressure from both sides. Loosely based on Adam Czerniaków.
- Franz Koenig is an ethnic German living in Poland who receives higher and higher status after the Nazi invasion. As the war progresses, Koenig becomes more and more corrupted. He succeeds Paul Bronski in leading the Warsaw Medical Institute.

== Planned movie ==
In August 2017, it was announced by film producer and Miramax co-founder Harvey Weinstein that he would produce a movie based on the novel, appointing himself as director. However, after the news of the producer's sexual misconduct against several women, his future in the business was put into question.

== See also ==
- Miła 18
- Warsaw Ghetto
- Warsaw Ghetto Uprising
