= Honey-Babe =

Single by Art Mooney and His Orchestra
- B-side: "No Regrets"
- Released: December 1954
- Genre: Big band
- Length: 2:55
- Label: MGM
- Songwriter(s): Max Steiner, Paul Francis Webster

Art Mooney and His Orchestra singles chronology
"Bip Bam" (1954)	"Honey-Babe" (1954)	"Sunset to Sunrise" (1955)

"Honey-Babe" is a song written by Max Steiner and Paul Francis Webster which was featured in the 1955 film Battle Cry. It was commercially recorded by Art Mooney and His Orchestra, reaching No. 6 on the U.S. pop chart in 1955.

The song ranked at No. 23 on Billboard magazine's Top 30 singles of 1955.

Since its release, the song has been used as a cadence, with countless variations and adaptations in verses, in all branches of the US military to the present day.

== Other versions ==
- The Sauter-Finegan Orchestra released the original version of the song as a single in February 1955, but it did not chart.
- Cyril Stapleton and His Orchestra featuring Gordon Langhorn released a version of the song as the B-side to his 1955 hit single "Blue Star".
- Lightnin' Hopkins' version of the song was released on his 1991 compilation album The Complete Aladdin Recordings.
