= KINARM =

Kinesiological Instrument for Normal and Altered Reaching Movement (KINARM) is an interactive robotic tool to allow researchers to quantify sensory, motor and cognitive function of the brain through behavioural tasks using the upper limb. There are two types of KINARMs - the KINARM Exoskeleton and the KINARM End-Point. The technology is used by both basic and clinical researchers in order to develop a greater understanding of the neurological impacts of a variety of injuries and diseases. KINARMs allow researchers to collect more objective and quantitative data to quantify brain function than traditional methods. The devices are created by BKIN Technologies Ltd., doing business as Kinarm, in Kingston, Ontario.

== History ==
The first KINARM robot to be created was the KINARM Exoskeleton. It was developed in 1999 by Stephen Scott, a neuroscientist and researcher at Queen's University. The KINARM Exoskeleton was commercialized in 2004 when BKIN Technologies was founded by Dr. Scott and Dr. Ian Brown with the assistance of PARTEQ Innovations.

== Product ==
KINARM robots quantify the user's ability to interact with a two-dimensional virtual reality environment using their upper limbs. The KINARM Exoskeleton uses a motorized exoskeleton to measure and manipulate the function of the upper limbs and is produced in both human and non-human primate (NHP) versions. The KINARM End-Point uses hand-held robotic rods and is used primarily for human use. Both robot labs are available with gaze-tracking technology.

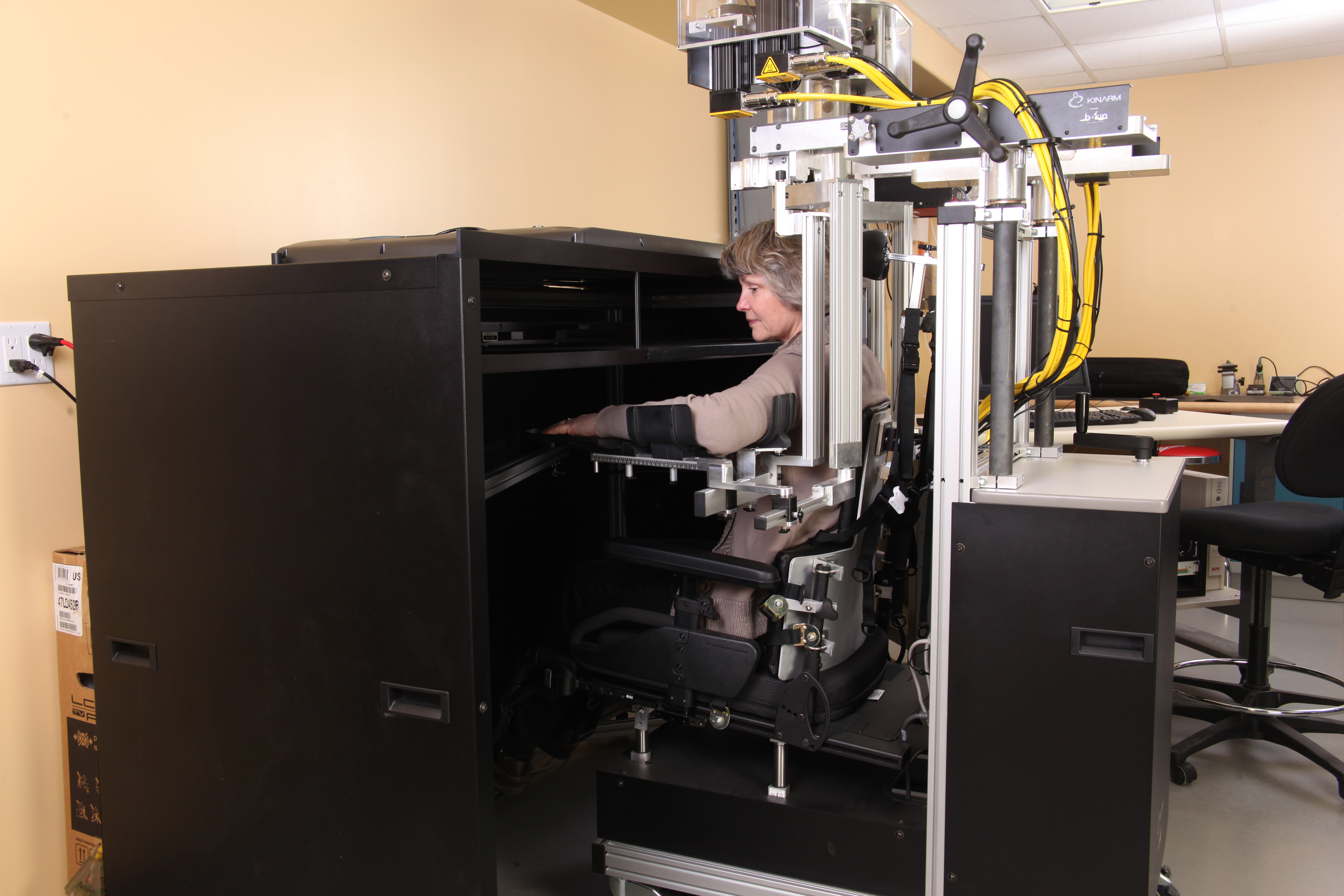
The KINARM Exoskeleton Lab.

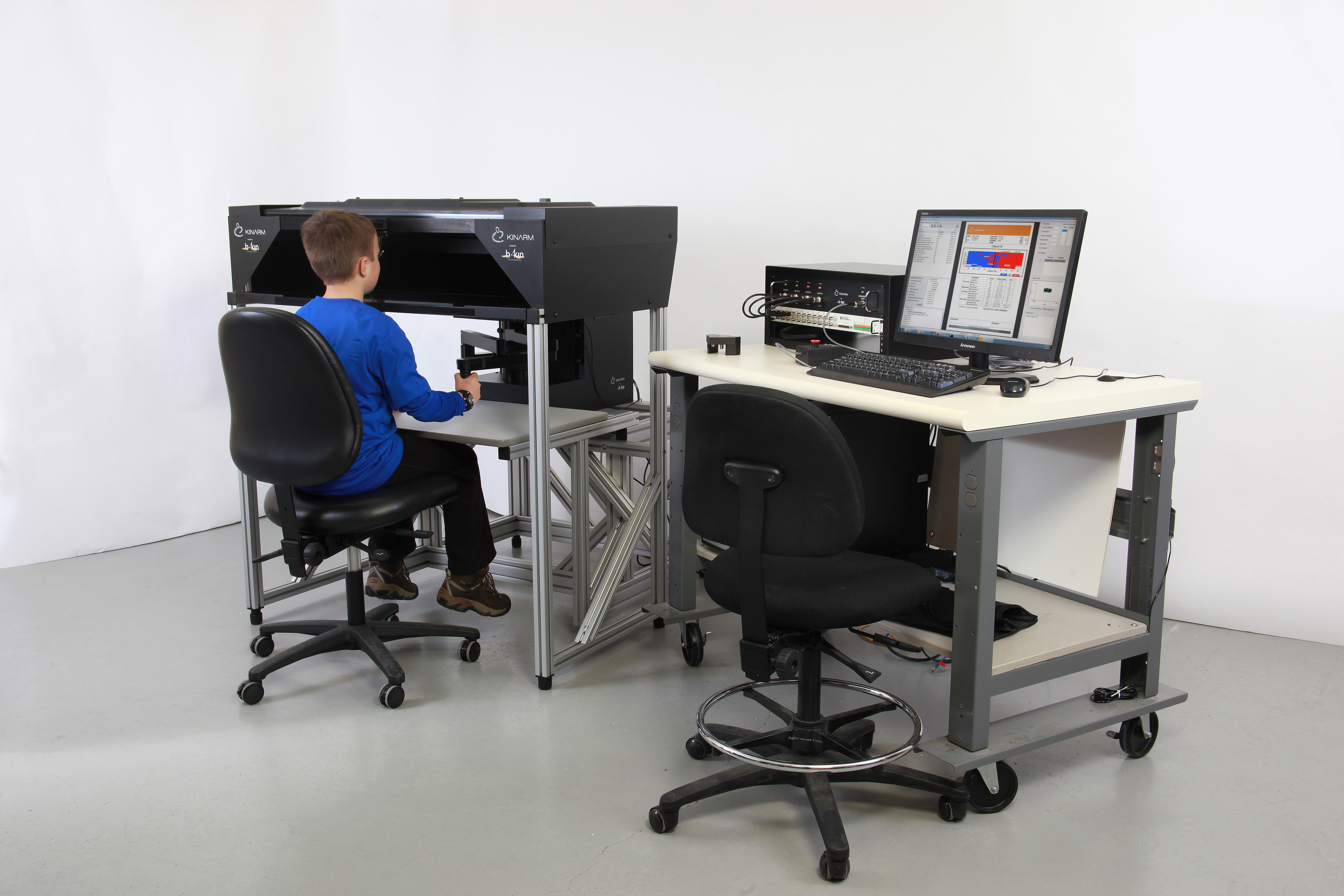
The KINARM End-Point Lab.

As of 2026, there were roughly 150 KINARM labs distributed in 16 countries worldwide.

== KINARM standard tests ==
The KINARM Standard Tests (KST) form a library of automated behavioural tasks designed for use with KINARMs. The KST reference database of typical behaviour has been extensively used in research publications and has created a universal platform to conduct research on brain function.

== Applications ==
There are over 500 published peer-reviewed journal articles that use KINARM Labs.

== See also ==
- Motor control
- Neuropsychology
- Powered exoskeleton
