= Redemption (Uris novel) =

1995 novel by Leon Uris

- Author: Leon Uris
- Publisher: HarperCollins
- Publication date: 1995-01-01
- Publication place: United States
- Media type: Print (hardcover)
- Pages: 848
- ISBN: 978-0060183332
- Preceded by: Trinity

Redemption (first published 1995) is a novel by author Leon Uris. It is a sequel to his epic 1976 book, Trinity.

Set mainly in the first half of the twentieth century in the years leading to the Irish Easter Rising, it tells the stories of the Irish revolutionary Conor Larkin's family, his brothers Liam and Dary, and Liam's son Rory.

After emigrating from Ireland to New Zealand, Liam establishes his own dynasty and sets to repeat the same cycle of conflict with his own sons as his father, Tomas.

Rory becomes a World War I war hero in the Gallipoli campaign. Rory's uncle Dary takes Catholic clerical vows, only to have a powerful love drive him to question both celibacy and his calling.
