= Loida Nicolas Lewis =

Filipino-born American businesswoman (born 1942)

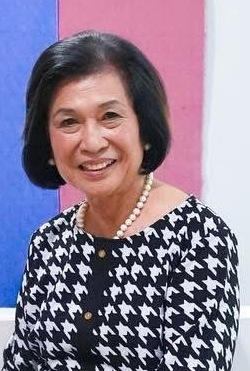
- Lewis in 2026
- Born: Loida Mañalac Nicolas; 1942 (age 83–84); Sorsogon, Sorsogon, Commonwealth of the Philippines
- Education: St. Theresa's College Manila (AB); University of the Philippines Diliman (LLB)
- Occupations: Businesswoman, civic leader, motivational speaker, author, and lawyer
- Spouse: Reginald F. Lewis (m. 1969; died 1993)
- Children: Leslie Malaika Lewis and Christina Lewis

Loida Nicolas Lewis (born 1942) is a Filipino-born American businesswoman who is the widow of TLC Beatrice founder and CEO Reginald Lewis. She resides in New York City.

== Early life ==
Lewis was born and raised in Sorsogon City, Sorsogon, the daughter of Francisco Nicolas and Magdalena Mañalac. Her sister, Imelda, was the former Lead Convenor of the National Anti-Poverty Commission during the administration of Gloria Macapagal-Arroyo and Chairperson of the Commission on Filipinos Overseas during the administration of Benigno Aquino III.

She earned her B.A. in humanities (cum laude) from St. Theresa's College Manila, and her Bachelor of Laws (LL. B.) from the University of the Philippines - Diliman. She placed 7th in her UP class 1967, passed the Bar Exams, and was admitted to practice in the Philippines in 1968.

In 1974, she became the first Asian woman to pass the New York State Bar without studying in a US Law School, making her eligible to practice law in both the Philippines and in the United States.

Lewis began to work for the Law Students Civil Research Council in New York, Manhattan Legal Services and when she passed the New York Law Bar, she worked as an associate with Antonio Martinez Law Office on immigration cases. When she won her discrimination case against the Federal Government, she finally worked as an attorney for the Immigration and Naturalization Service from 1978 until 1988. Lewis has had a major impact as an immigration lawyer, particularly when it comes to the rights of Filipino immigrants living in America. She co-wrote the book "How to Get a Green Card" with Ilona Bray JD, 12th Edition, published by NOLO.

Nicolas-Lewis met her husband-to-be Reginald F. Lewis on a blind date in New York City in 1968 and were then married a year later. It was in December 1987 when her husband Reginald acquired Beatrice International in a $985 million leveraged buyout, creating the largest African American-owned company in the United States. Reginald died from brain cancer in 1993. Lewis served as an informal adviser and confidant to her late husband. After a year of mourning, Loida N. Lewis served as CEO and Chair of TLC Beatrice International, the multinational food company that her husband entrusted to her. In an article written by Coco Marett entitled "How Loida Got Her Groove Back," the author states: "But despite her position and her wealth following her takeover of TLC Beatrice, Lewis remained far from flamboyant. In fact, the humble businesswoman's first move was to sell the company jet and limousines, and move her office from its top floor luxury suite in Manhattan to a more humble and inconspicuous space." This allowed her to maximize the profits of her late husband's company, which she sold in 1999.

Lewis is Chair and CEO of TLC Beatrice, LLC, a family investment firm.

In March 2023, Lewis published her memoir, "Why Should Guys Have All The Fun? An Asian American Story of Love, Marriage, Motherhood, and Running a Billion Dollar Empire" — a take off from her husband's best-selling autobiography, "Why Should White Guys Have All The Fun?" posthumously published in 1995. Her memoir was also published in digital and Audible format. In 2024, she launched The Loida Lewis Podcast.

== Personal life ==
Loida and Reginald were wed in Manila in 1969, and have two daughters, Leslie Malaika Lewis and Christina Lewis.

Lewis has spoken to audiences around the United States and the world to promote the biography of her late husband, "Why Should White Guys Have All the Fun? How Reginald Lewis Created a Billion Dollar Business Empire."

After her husband's death, Lewis also became active in political causes, co-founding the National Federation of Filipino-American Associations (NaFFAA) in 1997, alongside publisher Alex Esclamado, lawyer Rodel Rodis, and recognized civic leader Gloria Caoile, with the goal to empower Filipino-Americans. Their founding conference in Washington D.C. was a historical first, with over 1,000 community leaders, high school and college students, young professionals, civil rights activists, and Filipino World War II Veterans in attendance. As Lewis spoke in front of the White House, she emphasized the importance of justice for veterans, encouraged the youth to fight for their 'lolos' and 'lolas' and to keep their legacy of heroism alive.

In 2000, Lewis succeeded Esclamado as the National Chair of NaFFAA, where she played a crucial role in bringing Hillary Clinton, who was First Lady at that time, to the Federation's third conference in New York. Lewis also advocated for dual citizenship and overseas voting during Philippine national elections, stating that Filipino-Americans have "an important role to play in making sure that elected officials are accountable to the Filipino people."

== The Reginald F. Lewis Foundation ==
Shortly before his death in 1993, Reginald F. Lewis gave Harvard Law School the largest grant by an individual, up to that time, in the school’s history. The Law School’s International Law Center was renamed in his honor. Among other programs, the Foundation grant supports fellowships that teach minority lawyers to be law professors.

The RFL International Law Center is home to the International Legal Studies Library and contains one third of the Law Library’s international law collection. It also houses the Graduate Program where approximately 150 lawyers and scholars from around the world come to pursue LL.M or S.J.D. degrees, or to conduct research and write. The Reginald F. Lewis International Law Center is the first major facility at Harvard named in honor of an African American.

Loida Lewis currently Chairs the Reginald F. Lewis (RFL) Foundation, which also supports the Reginald F. Lewis College of Business at Virginia State University.

== See also ==
- List of first women lawyers and judges in New York
