= Christina Lewis =

American entrepreneur, investor, philanthropist, and writer

- Born: 1980 (age 45–46)
- Education: Harvard University (AB)
- Occupation: Entrepreneur
- Spouse: Daniel Halpern
- Children: 3
- Parents: Reginald F. Lewis (father); Loida Nicolas Lewis (mother)
- Honors: Champion of Change, White House (2014)
- Website: christinalewis.com

Christina Lewis Halpern is an American social entrepreneur, investor, philanthropist, and writer.

== Life and education ==
Lewis was born around 1980. She grew up in New York City with her parents and sister. Her father, Reginald F. Lewis, was a pioneer on Wall Street and the first African American to own a billion-dollar company in the US. Her mother, Loida Nicolas Lewis, is a Filipino-born American businesswoman who served as chair and CEO of TLC Beatrice after her husband died.

Lewis attended Harvard University where she graduated in 2002 with an A.B. in French and American history literature.

== Career ==
Lewis is the founder of Beatrice Advisors, a family office that she launched in June 2024.

In 2020, Lewis founded the Giving Gap] (formerly Give Blck) a philanthropic platform.

In 2013, she founded All Star Code, a computer science education non-profit focused on boys of color in technology. The Obama administration awarded Lewis with a Champion of Change acknowledgement in 2014.

Lewis is an executive producer of an untitled biopic, based on her father financier Reginald Lewis' life and posthumously-published memoir Why Should White Guys Have All the Fun? As of 2022, the project was being developed by Charles King of MACRO. She is also a member of the WIE Suite and vice chair of the Reginald F. Lewis Foundation.

In the early years of her career Lewis was a journalist and spent five years as a staff writer for the Wall Street Journal and one year as a crime reporter in Stamford, Connecticut.

== Personal life ==
Lewis lives in New York City with her husband and their three children.
