= Tye Kartye =

Canadian ice hockey player (born 2001)

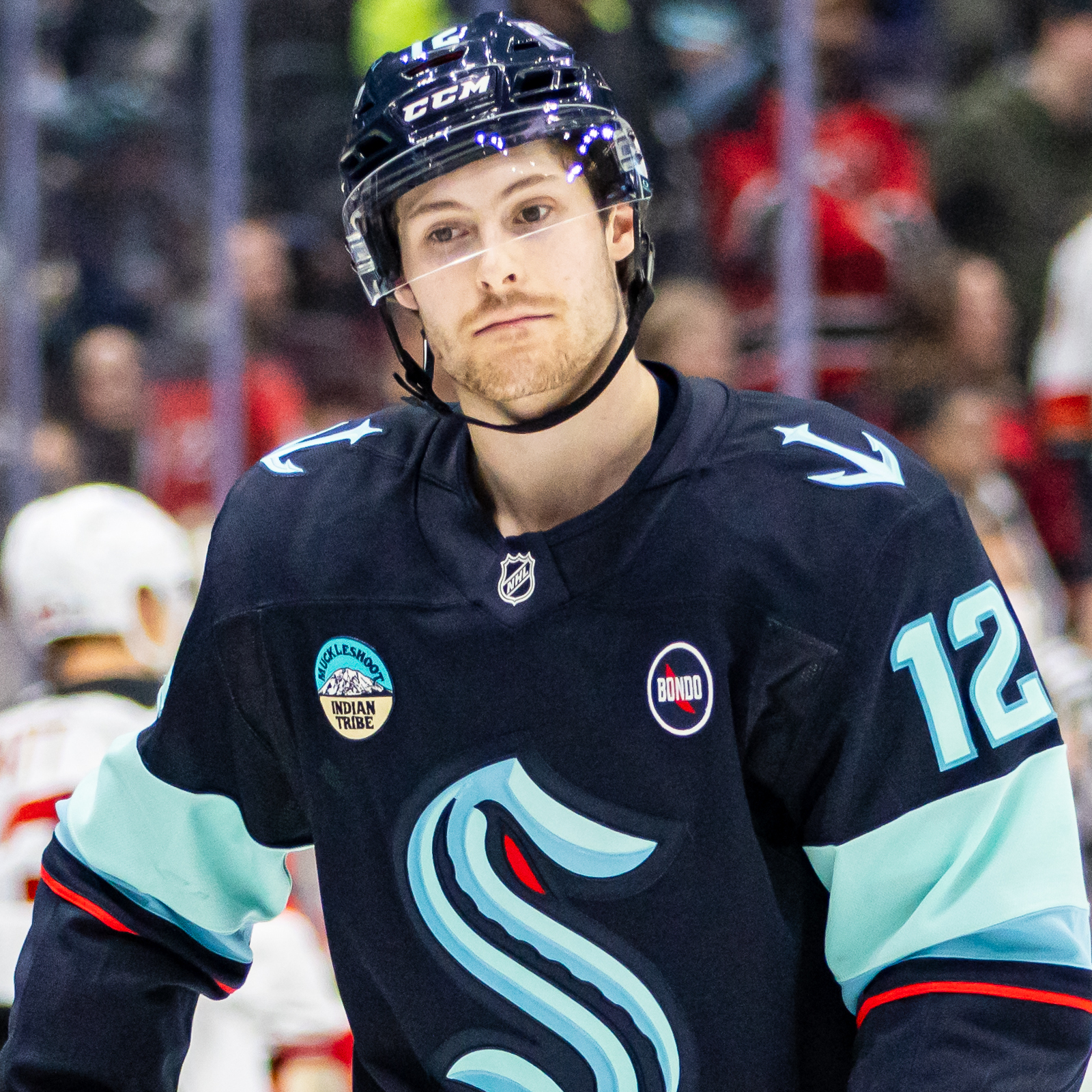
- Kartye with the Seattle Kraken in 2025
- Born: April 30, 2001 (age 25) Kingston, Ontario, Canada
- Height: 6 ft 0 in (183 cm)
- Weight: 202 lb (92 kg; 14 st 6 lb)
- Position: Left wing
- Shoots: Left
- NHL team Former teams: New York Rangers; Seattle Kraken
- NHL draft: Undrafted
- Playing career: 2022–present

Tye Kartye (/ˈkɑːrtjeɪ/ KAR-tyay; born April 30, 2001) is a Canadian professional ice hockey player who is a left winger for the New York Rangers of the National Hockey League (NHL). He has previously played for the Seattle Kraken.

== Early life ==
Kartye was born April 30, 2001, in Kingston, Ontario. His mother Richelle worked as a clinical nurse educator, while his father Todd was a secondary school chemistry teacher. Sister Talya is a Registered Nurse. Kartye played minor ice hockey with the Greater Kingston Jr. Frontenacs of the Eastern AAA Hockey League. In his final season with the Frontenacs, Kartye recorded 28 goals and 51 points in 36 games. Kartye also played hockey for La Salle Secondary School, helping to win their first Kingston Area Secondary Schools Athletic Association championship in 2017.

== Playing career ==
=== Junior ===
The Sault Ste. Marie Greyhounds of the Ontario Hockey League (OHL) selected Kartye in the eighth round, with the 158th overall pick, of the 2017 OHL Priority Selection. He failed to make the team during the 2017–18 season, but returned the next year physically stronger. Kartye signed with the Greyhounds on September 5, 2018, joining the team for the 2018–19 season. Kartye scored his first junior ice hockey goal on November 21, 2018, in a 7–4 victory over the Sudbury Wolves. Playing both left wing and centre, Kartye scored four goals and recorded 20 assists in 64 games during his rookie season. Kartye added two goals and three points in 11 playoff games, as the Greyhounds lost to the Saginaw Spirit in the OHL Western Conference semifinals.

Kartye returned to the Greyhounds for the 2019–20 season as one of several second-year players that general manager Kyle Raftis hoped would take a bigger role. Although the Greyhounds struggled in the first half, Kartye showed personal improvement: playing on the top line with Jaromír Pytlík and Zack Trott, he recorded 35 points, including 14 goals, in as many games by Christmas break. By the time that the season was suspended due to the impacts of the COVID-19 pandemic, Kartye was third on the Greyhounds with 25 goals and 53 points in 64 games. Head coach John Dean praised Kartye's dedication and consistency even during an otherwise frustrating season.

Although the OHL planned a 64-game regular season that would begin December 2020, the 2020–21 OHL season was repeatedly delayed and ultimately canceled. Because he had not been drafted by any National Hockey League (NHL) team, Kartye remained with the Greyhounds as one of five overage players for the 2021–22 season. Kartye scored his first OHL hat-trick on October 14, 2021, in a 6–3 victory over the Barrie Colts. On November 5, he was named an alternate captain behind Ryan O'Rourke. He recorded his 100th OHL point two weeks later, with a goal in a 4–3 win over the Windsor Spitfires. Kartye added another hat-trick on April 4, during Sault Ste. Marie's 8–2 rout of the Sarnia Sting. Kartye finished the season with 45 goals and 79 points in 63 regular season games. He also appeared in 10 postseason games, recording seven goals and nine points as the Greyhounds lost to the Flint Firebirds in the Western Conference semifinals. He was named to the 2021–22 OHL Third All-Star Team and was a finalist for the Leo Lalonde Memorial Trophy, given to the top overage player in the league. In three seasons of junior hockey, Kartye finished his OHL career with 74 goals and 156 points in 191 games.

=== Professional ===
==== Seattle Kraken (2022–2026) ====
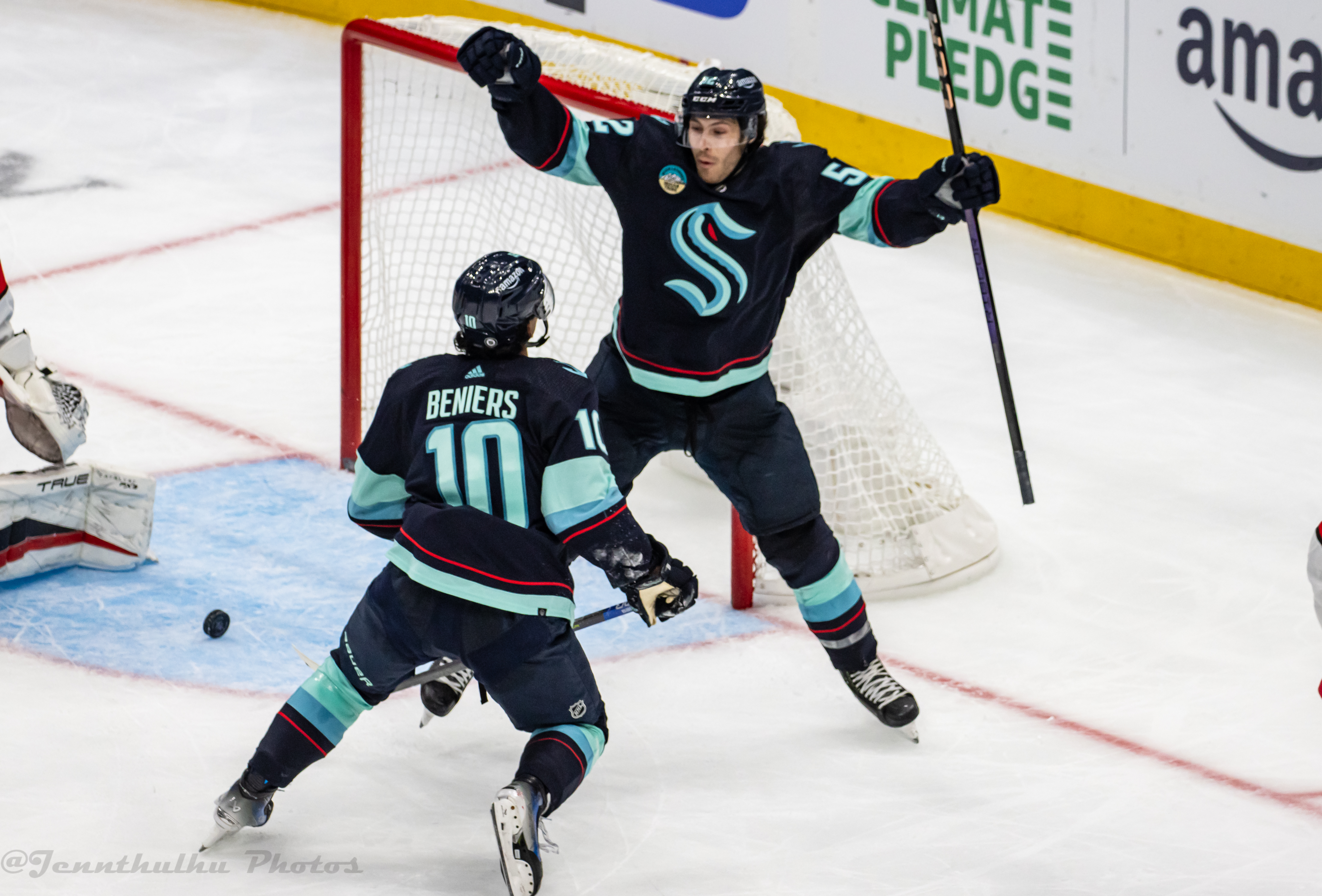
Kartye celebrating after scoring his first NHL regular-season goal.

On March 1, 2022, the Seattle Kraken signed Kartye to a three-year, entry-level contract. During the 2022–23 season, Kartye recorded 28 goals and 29 assists in 72 games for the Coachella Valley Firebirds. He led all rookies in scoring with 57 points, and was one of only eight rookies league-wide to play in all 72 of his team's games during the regular season. Following the season he was awarded the Dudley "Red" Garrett Memorial Award, and named to the AHL Rookie All-Star team.

On April 16, 2023, Kartye was recalled by the Seattle Kraken. He made his NHL debut for the Kraken on April 26, in game 5 of the Western Conference first round against the Colorado Avalanche during the 2023 Stanley Cup playoffs. He replaced Jared McCann, who was injured on a late hit by Cale Makar in game 4. He played on the Kraken's top line alongside Matty Beniers and Jordan Eberle, and scored his first career NHL goal against Alexandar Georgiev during the second period. He became the eighth player in NHL history to score a playoff goal in his NHL debut, and the first since Makar in 2019.

After the 2024–25 season, the Kraken signed Kartye to a two-year contract with an average annual value of $1.25 million. Prior to being placed on waivers he recorded three goals and five assists in 40 games during the 2025–26 season. He ranked third on team with 98 hits. In three seasons with the Kraken he recorded 20 goals and 21 assists in 180 career regular season games.

==== New York Rangers (2026–present) ====
The Kraken placed Kartye on waivers on February 26, 2026, and the New York Rangers claimed him the next day. There, he joined a group of bottom-six forwards hoping to contribute defensively during the Rangers' retool.

== Career statistics ==
			Regular season					Playoffs
Season	Team	League	GP	G	A	Pts	PIM	GP	G	A	Pts	PIM
2016–17	Kingston Frontenacs	ETA	36	18	14	32	18	10	6	3	9	18
2017–18	Kingston Frontenacs	ETA	36	28	23	51	34	7	5	4	9	4
2018–19	Sault Ste. Marie Greyhounds	OHL	64	4	20	24	33	11	2	1	3	2
2019–20	Sault Ste. Marie Greyhounds	OHL	64	25	28	53	28	—	—	—	—	—
2021–22	Sault Ste. Marie Greyhounds	OHL	63	45	34	79	57	10	7	2	9	4
2022–23	Coachella Valley Firebirds	AHL	72	28	29	57	74	18	6	2	8	8
2022–23	Seattle Kraken	NHL	—	—	—	—	—	10	3	2	5	2
2023–24	Seattle Kraken	NHL	77	11	9	20	37	—	—	—	—	—
2024–25	Seattle Kraken	NHL	63	6	7	13	43	—	—	—	—	—
2024–25	Coachella Valley Firebirds	AHL	3	2	2	4	4	—	—	—	—	—
2025–26	Seattle Kraken	NHL	40	3	5	8	21	—	—	—	—	—
2025–26	New York Rangers	NHL	24	5	9	14	17	—	—	—	—	—
NHL totals			204	25	30	55	118	10	3	2	5	2

== Awards and honours ==
Award	Year	Ref
OHL
Third All-Star Team	2022	
AHL
All-Rookie Team	2023	
Dudley "Red" Garrett Memorial Award	2023	
