= Reginald Lewis =

American businessman (1942–1993)

Reginald F. Lewis
- Born: Reginald Francis Lewis; December 7, 1942; Baltimore, Maryland, U.S
- Died: January 19, 1993 (aged 50); New York City, New York, U.S.
- Education: Virginia State University; Harvard Law School
- Spouse: Loida Nicolas-Lewis
- Children: Leslie and Christina Lewis

Reginald Francis Lewis (December 7, 1942 – January 19, 1993) was an American businessman. He was one of the richest Black American men in the 1980s, and the first African-American to build a billion-dollar company: TLC Beatrice International Holdings Inc.

In 1993, Forbes listed Lewis among the 400 richest Americans, with a net worth estimated at $400 million.

== Biography ==
=== Early life ===
Lewis was born in Baltimore, Maryland to Carolyn and Clinton Lewis. His father was a small business owner, and his mother was a teacher. By age 9, his mother and father were divorced. Lewis grew up in a middle-class neighborhood, but he earned his own money as a paper-boy, delivering the Baltimore Afro-American newspaper to 10 neighbors. He soon built his route to 100 customers and later sold it for a profit; even though he really didn't own it. He attended Baltimore's Catholic schools until high school when he was rejected by the white Catholic high schools in 1954. Lewis then chose the racially segregated Dunbar High School in Baltimore. At Dunbar he started at quarterback on the football team, played shortstop for the varsity baseball team, was a forward on the basketball team and was team captain of all three. He won a football scholarship to Virginia State University (VSU) and joined the Alpha Phi chapter of Kappa Alpha Psi. After graduating from VSU with a degree in political science in 1965, he took part in a summer program at Harvard set up by the Rockefeller Foundation that introduced African Americans to the study of law. While there, he made such an impression that Harvard invited him to attend school that fall. At the time, this made him the only person in the 148-year history of Harvard Law School to be accepted before even applying. He completed his Juris Doctor at Harvard Law in 1968.

=== Career ===
Recruited to top New York law firm Paul, Weiss, Rifkind, Wharton & Garrison LLP immediately after law school, Lewis left to start his own firm two years later. After 15 years as a corporate lawyer with his own practice, he moved to the other side of the table by creating TLC Group L.P., a private equity firm, in 1983.

His first major deal was the purchase of the McCall Pattern Company, a home sewing pattern business, for $22.5 million. Lewis had learned from an article in Fortune that the Esmark holding company, which recently purchased Norton Simon, planned to divest from the McCall Pattern Company, a maker of home sewing patterns founded in 1870. With fewer people sewing at home, McCall was seemingly on the decline—but it had posted profits of $6 million in 1983 on sales of $51.9 million. At the time, McCall was number two in its industry, holding 29.7 percent of the market, compared to industry leader Simplicity Patterns with 39.4 percent.

He managed to negotiate the price down, then raised $1 million from family and friends and borrowed the rest from institutional investors and investment banking firm First Boston Corp.

Within a year, he turned the company around by freeing capital tied in fixed assets, such as buildings and machinery, and finding a new use for machinery during downtime by manufacturing greeting cards. He then started to recruit managers from rival companies. He strengthened McCall by containing costs, improving quality, beginning to export to China, and emphasizing new product introductions. This combination led to the company's most profitable year in its history. With the addition of McCall real estate worth an estimated $6 million that the company retained ownership, he later sold McCall at a 90-1 return, resulting in a tremendous profit for investors. Lewis's share was 81.7 percent of the $90 million.

In 1987, Lewis bought Beatrice International Foods from Beatrice Companies for $985 million, renaming it TLC Beatrice International Holdings Inc., a snack food, beverage, and grocery store conglomerate that was the largest African-American owned and managed business in the U.S. The deal partly was financed through Mike Milken of the maverick investment bank Drexel Burnham Lambert. In order to reduce the amount needed to finance the leveraged buyout, Lewis planned to sell some of the division's assets simultaneous with the takeover.

When TLC Beatrice reported revenue of $1.8 billion in 1987, it became the first black-owned company to have more than $1 billion in annual sales. At its peak in 1996, TLC Beatrice International Holdings Inc. had sales of $2.2 billion and was number 512 on Fortune magazine's list of 1,000 largest companies.

=== Philanthropy ===
In 1987, Lewis established the Reginald F. Lewis Foundation, which funded grants of approximately $10 million to various non-profit programs and organizations while he was alive. His first major grant was an unsolicited $1 million to Howard University in 1988; the federal government matched the grant, making the gift $2 million, which was used to fund an endowment for scholarships, fellowships, and faculty sabbaticals.

In 1992, Lewis donated $3 million to Harvard Law School, the largest grant at the time in the school's history. The school renamed its International Law Center the Reginald F. Lewis International Law Center, the first major facility at Harvard named in honor of an African American.

While alive, Lewis made known his desire to support a museum of African-American culture. In 2005, the Reginald F. Lewis Museum of Maryland African American History & Culture opened in Baltimore with the support of a $5 million grant from his foundation. Prior to the opening of the National Museum of African American History and Culture in Washington D.C. it was the East Coast's largest African-American museum occupying an 82,000 square-foot facility with permanent and special exhibition space, interactive learning environments, auditorium, resource center, oral history recording studio, museum shop, café, classrooms, meeting rooms, outside terrace, and reception areas. It highlights the history and accomplishments of African Americans with a special focus on Maryland's African-American community. The museum is also a Smithsonian affiliate.

Lewis was counsel to the New York-based Commission for Racial Injustice.

=== Death ===
On January 19, 1993, Lewis died at age 50 from brain cancer. His wife Loida Nicolas Lewis took over the company a year after his death and sold it in 1999.

== Personal life ==
Lewis was married to Loida Nicolas Lewis, a Filipina lawyer. They had two daughters, Leslie and Christina. Lewis was Catholic.

== See also ==
- A God in Ruins (Uris novel), which features a character similar to Lewis
