= Art Mooney =

American singer and bandleader (1911–1993)

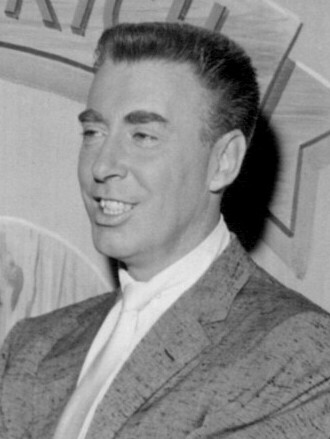
- Mooney as a celebrity guest on Strike It Rich
- Born: Arthur Joseph Mooney, February 11, 1911; Lowell, Massachusetts, U.S.
- Died: September 9, 1993 (aged 82); North Miami, Florida, U.S.
- Occupations: Singer, bandleader

Arthur Joseph Mooney (February 11, 1911 – September 9, 1993) was an American singer and bandleader. His biggest hits were "I'm Looking Over a Four Leaf Clover" and "Baby Face" in 1948 and "Nuttin' For Christmas," with Barry Gordon, in 1955. His fourth million selling song "Honey-Babe" (1955) was used in the motion picture, Battle Cry, having reached the Top 10 in the US.

He also made a popular 1948 recording of "Bluebird of Happiness." Mooney's name, as well as his star on the Hollywood Walk of Fame, was prominently featured in the 1990 motion picture The Adventures of Ford Fairlane.

== Death ==
He died at age 82 in North Miami, Florida of lung disease on September 9, 1993. He was survived by his wife, Vera, his sister, Marce Kaminsky, and 13 nieces and nephews.

== Singles ==
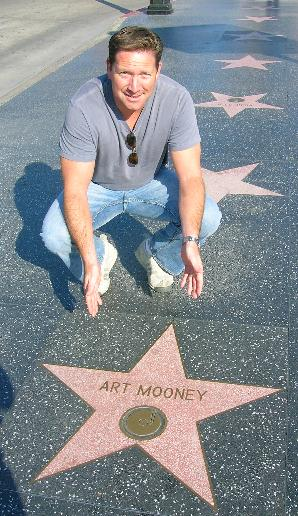

Year	Title	Chart positions
Year	Title	US
1948	"I'm Looking Over a Four Leaf Clover"	1
1948	"Baby Face"	3
1948	"Bluebird of Happiness"	5
1949	"Beautiful Eyes"	18
1949	"Doo Dee Doo On an Old Kazoo"	21
1949	"Again"	7
1949	"Merry-Go-Round Waltz"	29
1949	"Twenty-Four Hours of Sunshine"	13
1949	"Hop-Scotch Polka (Scotch Hot)"	16
1949	"Toot, Too, Tootsie (Good-Bye)"	19
1949	"I Never See Maggie Alone"	21
1950	"If I Knew You Were Comin' I'd've Baked a Cake"	28
1950	"M-I-S-S-I-S-S-I-P-P-I"	23
1955	"Honey-Babe"	6
1955	"Nuttin' For Christmas"	6
1956	"Daydreams"	73
1956	"Giant"	77
1958	"March from the River Kwai & Colonel Bogey"	88
1959	"Smile"	107
1960	"Banjo Boy"	100
1960	"Captain Buffalo"	-
1960	"I Ain't Down Yet"	108
