= Chen Yutian =

Chinese research scientist

- Born: Chen Yutian (陈御天); 1984 (age 41–42); Taizhou, Zhejiang, China
- Education: Tsinghua University; UC Irvine
- Scientific career
- Fields: Computer science

Chen Yutian (Chinese: 陈御天; pinyin: Chén Yùtiān; born 1984) is a Chinese research scientist currently employed at Deepmind.

== Biography ==
Chen earned his B.E. of Electronic Engineering from Tsinghua University in June 2007. He went to the University of California, Irvine, in the United States to pursue a doctoral degree, and received M.S. and Ph.D. of Computer Science in machine learning respectively in December 2009 and June 2013 respectively under the supervision of Professor Max Welling.

== Awards ==
Here are the list of awards won by Chen Yutian:

- ICS Dean’s Fellowship, University of California, Irvine (2007)
- Amazon AWS in Education Machine Learning Grant (2014)
