= Dharshan Kumaran =

English chess grandmaster (born 1975)

Personal information
- Born: 7 June 1975 (age 51)

Chess career
- Country: England
- Title: Grandmaster (1997)
- FIDE rating: 2505 (July 2026)
- Peak rating: 2505 (January 1995)

Dharshan Kumaran (born 7 June 1975) is an English chess grandmaster who has retired from ranked tournaments and is a researcher of neuroscience collaborating with leaders in that field. He won the World Under-12 Championship in 1986, won the World Under-16 Championship in 1991. He finished 3rd equal in the World Under-20 Championship in 1994 and competed in the highest level competitions as recently as 2001.

He works as a neuroscientist, specialising in research at DeepMind, an inter-body collaboration led by University College London. He has authored (mostly co-authored) 75 articles in this field as noted in Google scholar's library of papers in neuroscience (between 2003 and 2022). The most cited of these, namely by more than 20,000 articles, is '"Human-level control through deep reinforcement learning" which he co-authored in 2015 with others including V Mnih, K Kavukcuoglu, D Silver, AA Rusu, J Veness and MG Bellemare, a 4-page article in Nature in 2015.
