= A God in Ruins (Uris novel) =

1999 novel by Leon Uris

- First edition
- Author: Leon Uris
- Language: English
- Published: 1999 (HarperCollins)
- Publication place: United States
- Media type: Print (hardcover) & Paperback
- Pages: 496 pp
- ISBN: 0-06-018377-2
- OCLC: 40668126
- Dewey Decimal: 813/.54 21
- LC Class: PS3541.R46 G63 1999

A God in Ruins is a 1999 novel by Leon Uris.

Set between the 1940s and 2008, the book follows the life of Quinn Patrick O'Connell, a Jewish orphan adopted by a Catholic family and now the fictional Democratic candidate for the 2008 United States Presidency, running against incumbent, Thornton Tomtree. The book is set in the last week of the election campaign, with flashbacks to earlier periods.

== Characters ==
=== Quinn Patrick O'Connell ===
Quinn Patrick O'Connell was detached from his parents at the age of one and adopted by the Irish O'Connell family at the age of three. He has lived in a ranch in Colorado and studied in the University of Colorado at Colorado Springs. He went on to become a Colorado state senator, and later Governor of Colorado, gun control being his main platform.

During this time he has had two relationships, with Greer Little and Rita Maldonado. Both women lead him through his election campaign and set him up for the 2008 presidency.

Throughout his life, Quinn wishes to find his birth parents, but is unable to do so as even his adopted parents have no information whatsoever. He is found by his brother, a Jewish policeman, and confronts the nation before the 2008 elections, setting off Kristallnacht-like riots throughout the country.

Having served on an elite unit called RAM in the Marine Corps, eventually with the rank of Marine Gunner, O'Connell is known for his honesty and high moral principles – a trait which goes a long way to help him in his election campaign.

=== Thornton Tomtree ===
Thornton "T3" Tomtree is a technological genius who invents an apparently unhackable computer named "The Bulldog". While good with technology, he is portrayed as an insincere politician, who is mainly in it for power and influence. His political career is led by a childhood friend, Darnell Jefferson, in the novel the first African-American billionaire.

== Reception ==
Kirkus Reviews found that the book fell short, commenting "Uris himself offers a rather woozy moral message bordering on bombast in a novel that may widen his audience and boost sales, but hardly matches the author’s messianic ambitions." January Magazine found it disappointing, a "blemish on his otherwise sterling record", poorly executed and reading more like a screenplay than a novel.

== See also ==
- Reginald Lewis
