= Battle Cry (film) =

1955 film by Raoul Walsh

- DVD cover
- Directed by: Raoul Walsh
- Screenplay by: Leon Uris
- Based on: Battle Cry by Leon Uris
- Produced by: Jack L. Warner; Raoul Walsh
- Starring: Van Heflin; Aldo Ray; Mona Freeman; Nancy Olson; James Whitmore; Raymond Massey; Tab Hunter; Dorothy Malone; Anne Francis
- Narrated by: James Whitmore
- Cinematography: Sidney Hickox
- Edited by: William H. Ziegler
- Music by: Max Steiner
- Distributed by: Warner Bros.
- Release date: March 12, 1955
- Running time: 149 minutes
- Country: United States
- Languages: English; Navajo
- Box office: $8 million (US/ Canada rentals)

Battle Cry is a 1955 American war drama film starring Van Heflin, Aldo Ray, James Whitmore, Tab Hunter, Nancy Olson, Anne Francis, Dorothy Malone, Raymond Massey, and Mona Freeman. The film is based on the 1953 novel by former Marine Leon Uris, who also wrote the screenplay, and was produced and directed by Raoul Walsh. The film was shot at Camp Pendleton, California, and featured a large amount of cooperation from the United States Marine Corps.

== Plot ==
In January 1942, All-American athlete Danny Forrester is one of many young men responding to a call for Marine Corps recruits. Traveling by train from Baltimore, Maryland, Forrester encounters other recruits en route to the Marine training camp near San Diego, including womanizing lumberjack Andy Hookans, bookish Marion Hotchkiss, Navajo Indian Shining Lighttower, troublemaking "Spanish" Joe Gomez, L.Q. Jones of Arkansas, Speedy of Texas, and the Philadelphian Ski, who is eager to escape the slums, but upset to leave his girlfriend Susan.

After arduous weeks of boot camp, the men are accepted into radio school and assigned to the battalion commanded by Maj. Sam "High Pockets" Huxley. The Marines receive communication instruction from Sgt. Mac and spend weekends in San Diego. Ski drowns his sorrows in a sleazy bar to forget that Susan has married another man. Mac and his fellow Marines try to rescue him from the bar and get in a brawl. Danny is saved from excessive drinking by the married USO worker Elaine Yarborough, and begins a relationship with her, until Mac, noticing a change in his performance, arranges for him to call his girlfriend Kathy long-distance. Recognizing the young man's loneliness, Mac and Huxley grant him a furlough to Baltimore, where Danny elopes with Kathy. The meditative Marion, hoping to write about his wartime experiences, begins seeing the beautiful and mysterious Rae, but learns why she won't reveal her identity to him when she shows up with other B-girls ordered by Joe, at a party celebrating the regiment's orders to ship out. The men are warmly received in Wellington, New Zealand. Andy tries to woo the married Pat Rogers, suggesting he fill the void left by her husband, whom he believes is fighting in Africa. Pat reveals her husband was killed in action, and later invites Andy to visit her parents' farm. Despite their attraction, they settle on a chaste friendship.

The Sixth Regiment, now known as "Huxley's Harlots," is sent as reinforcements to Guadalcanal to "mop up" a resistant band of Japanese soldiers. Ski is killed by a sniper, but the battle-weary survivors return to New Zealand, where Pat nurses the malaria-stricken Andy and risks a short-term romance with him. To restore the men's stamina, newly promoted Lieutenant-Colonel Huxley orders a gruelling 60-mile hike. When other companies are trucked back to camp, Huxley has his men march, blistered and near collapse, in record-breaking time. Huxley is frustrated his men's performance doesn't result in orders for Tarawa with the main invasion, once again being used as reinforcements to mop up Japanese holdouts afterward. Pat attempts to pre-emptively break up with Andy but she accepts his surprise proposal of marriage, then admits she is pregnant. The pair marry with Huxley's approval, and Andy considers deserting to stay with her. Huxley asks Pat to convince Andy to return voluntarily.

At Tarawa, many of Huxley's men are killed fulfilling their mission and they move to Hawaii to once again wait in reserve. Huxley risks court-martial to convince General Snipes his men are restless and their talents are wasted on mopping up operations. Offended by Huxley's "impudence," Snipes nonetheless assigns the battalion to the initial invasion of Red Beach on Saipan. Huxley's unit is isolated from the rest of the division and suffer heavily from artillery fired from the hills above them. Huxley is killed, and Danny and Andy are seriously wounded but the battalion holds out until naval gunfire suppresses the Japanese and the surviving Marines complete their mission.

Recuperating from the loss of a leg in a rest camp, a depressed Andy won't communicate with Pat or his concerned friends. Tough words from Mac make him realize that Pat still loves him. Andy returns to her and his baby son after completing rehabilitation. Danny also receives a medical discharge and returns to Baltimore accompanied by Mac, who is visiting the families of fallen Marines. Danny reunites with the waiting Kathy, as fresh recruits board the train.

== Cast ==
- Van Heflin as Major / Lieutenant Colonel Sam "High Pockets" Huxley, Commanding Officer, 2nd Battalion, 6th Marine Regiment
- Aldo Ray as Private First Class Andy Hookens
- Nancy Olson as Pat Rogers / Mrs. Pat Rogers
- James Whitmore as Master Technical Sergeant Mac
- Tab Hunter as Private First Class / Corporal Danny Forrester
- Mona Freeman as Kathy, Danny's Girl / Mrs. Danny Forrester
- Dorothy Malone as Mrs. Elaine Yarborough, USO Manager
- Raymond Massey as Major General Snipes
- Anne Francis as Rae, The Party Girl
- William Campbell as Private First Class "Ski" Wronski
- John Lupton as Private / Corporal Marion "Sister Mary" Hotchkiss
- Justus E. McQueen (later L. Q. Jones) as Private L. Q. Jones
- Perry Lopez as Private Joe "Spanish Joe" Gomez
- Fess Parker as Private "Speedy"
- Willis Bouchey as Mr. Forrester
- Jonas Applegarth as Private Lighttower, Navajo Phonetalker
- Felix Noriego as Private Crazy Horse, Navajo Phonetalker
- Carleton Young as Major Jim Wellman, Battalion Executive Officer
- Rhys Williams as Pat, Rogers's Father
- Allyn Ann McLerie as Ruby, Waitress In Diner
- Gregory Walcott as Sgt. Jim Beller, the Drill Instructor

== Production ==
According to Tab Hunter others who auditioned for the part played by Dorothy Malone included Phyllis Thaxter and Meg Myles.

== Music ==
The film featured the song "Honey-Babe" by Art Mooney which reached #6 on the U.S. pop chart in 1955.

== Reception ==
Bosley Crowther of The New York Times criticized the film for being too focused on love rather than war, which was the opposite of what the Marines had experienced in the Pacific during World War II.

The success of the film reginited Malone's career.

== Awards and nominations ==
Award	Category	Nominee	Result	Ref.
Academy Awards	Best Scoring of a Dramatic or Comedy Picture	Max Steiner	Nominated	

== See also ==
- List of American films of 1955
- List of films set in New Zealand
