= Trinity (novel) =

1976 novel by Leon Uris

- First edition
- Language: English
- Publisher: Doubleday
- Publication date: 1976

Trinity is a novel by American author Leon Uris, published in 1976 by Doubleday. It spent 21 weeks atop The New York Times Best Sellers list in 1976 and 14 weeks in 1977.

The book tells the story of the intertwining lives of the following families: the Larkins and O'Neills, Catholic hill farmers from the fictional town of Ballyutogue in County Donegal; the Macleods, Protestant shipyard workers from Belfast; and the Hubbles.

The book describes a number of historical events, from the Great Famine of the 1840s to the Easter Rising in 1916.

== Plot ==
Conor's best friend Seamus O'Neill begins school in town under a Protestant named Andrew Ingram. Conor, needed at home, helps his father in the fields, until he becomes an apprentice at a blacksmith shop. As the years pass, the boys become friends with Mr. Ingram, who teaches them of the power of books and the history of their Irish forefathers. Seamus goes to college in Belfast, and Conor heads to Derry. In Bogside Conor witnesses the extent of the disaster that has befallen the Irish people. Bogside is in tatters and a state of despair that has stricken its inhabitants since before the Great Famine that had taken place between 1845 and 1852. Held down by the Protestant reign in Derry's labor unions, the Catholics are dying slowly without hope.

In Derry, Conor discovers other like-minded Irish tired of the oppression of the Catholics by the Protestants. This small group, with the support of the few Irish politicians, becomes the Republican Brotherhood, the roots of Sinn Féin, and the whisper of freedom throughout Ireland.

== Reviews ==
- Kirkus Reviews
- The New York Times

== Sequel ==
A 1995 sequel, Redemption, ties up many loose ends in the saga.
