= Stephen H. Scott =

Canadian neuroscientist and engineer (born 1964)

Stephen Scott FRSC
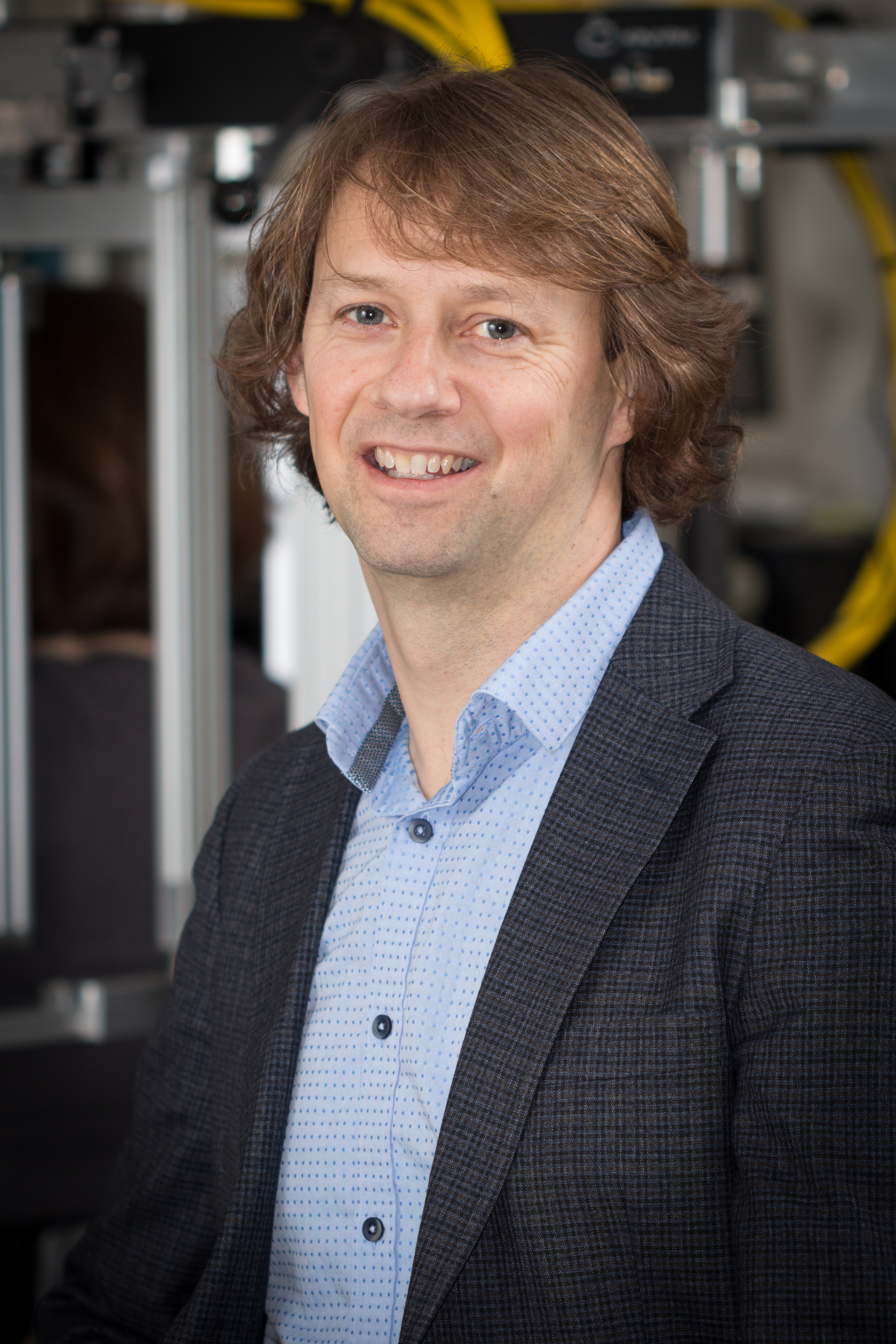
- Born: 5 July 1964 (age 62); Grimsby, Ontario, Canada
- Education: University of Waterloo (B.A.Sc) (M.A.Sc.); Queen's University (PhD)
- Spouse: Anne Vivian-Scott
- Scientific career
- Fields: Neuroscience; Motor control
- Workplaces: Queen's University; Université de Montréal
- Website: LIMB Lab Website

Stephen Harold Scott FRSC (born 5 July 1964) is a Canadian neuroscientist and engineer who has made significant contributions to the field of sensorimotor neuroscience and the methods of assessing neurological function. He is a professor in both the Department of Biomedical and Molecular Sciences and the Department of Medicine at Queen's University. In 2013, he was named the GlaxoSmithKline-Canadian Institutes of Health Research (GSK-CIHR) Chair in Neurosciences at Queen's. He is the Co-Founder and Chief Scientific Officer of Kinarm (also BKIN Technologies), the technology transfer company that commercializes and manufactures his invention the Kinarm.

== Education ==
Scott received his Bachelor's of Applied Science in Systems Design Engineering from the University of Waterloo in 1988. He went on to complete his Masters of Applied Science in Systems Design Engineering at the University of Waterloo in 1989, and then completed his PhD in Physiology at Queen's University in 1993.

== Career ==
Scott pursued his scientific career as a post-doctoral fellow(1993-1995) and then as a chercheur adjoint(1995-1997) at the Université de Montréal. He joined the Department of Biomedical and Molecular Sciences at Queen's University in 1997.

During his time at Queen's University, he developed the KINARM, a robotic device that objectively and quantitatively assesses the sensorimotor and cognitive impairments associated with a range of damages and diseases. The KINARM is now being sold worldwide for both basic and clinical research purposes.

His current research focuses on the use of optimal control principles during voluntary motor actions, as well as collaborating with clinical researchers to understand how robotics can improve our assessment of brain function.

== Awards and honours ==
Scott was the 2012 recipient of the Barbara Turnbull Award, which recognizes outstanding research into spinal cord injury in Canada. He also received the Mihran and Mary Basmajian Award in 2002 for his research into the adaptive learning of the limbs.

In 2022, Scott was elected as a Fellow of the Royal Society of Canada for his work understanding the computational, neural, mechanical and behavioural aspects of voluntary motor control.

== Notable Publications ==
- Kalaska, J.F., Scott, S.H., Cisek, P. and Sergio, L.E. (1997) Cortical control of reaching movements. Current Opinion in Neurobiology 7:849-859. DOI
- Scott, S.H., Gribble, P., Graham, K. and Cabel, D.W. (2001) Dissociation between hand motion and population vectors from neural activity in motor cortex. Nature 413:161-165. DOI.
- Gribble, P.L. and Scott, S.H. (2002) Overlap of multiple internal models in primary motor cortex. Nature 417:938-941. DOI
- Singh, K. and Scott, S.H. (2003) A motor learning strategy reflecting neural circuitry for limb control. Nature Neuroscience 6:399-403. DOI
- Scott, S.H. and Norman, K.E. (2003) Computational approaches to motor control and their potential role for interpreting motor dysfunction. Current Opinion in Neurology 16:693-698.
- Scott, S.H. (2004) Optimal feedback control and the neural basis of motor control. Nature Reviews Neuroscience 5:532-546. DOI
- Kurtzer, I. Herter, T.M. and Scott, S.H. (2005) Random change in cortical load representation suggests distinct control of posture and movement. Nature Neuroscience 8:498-504. DOI
- Nozaki, D., Kurtzer, I. and Scott, S.H. (2006) To learn with one limb or two? Limited transfer between unimanual and bimanual skills within the same limb. Nature Neuroscience 9:1364-1366.
- Scott, S.H. (2012) The computational and neural basis of voluntary motor control and planning. Trends in Cognitive Sciences 16:541-549. DOI
