= Leon Uris =

American author (1924–2003)

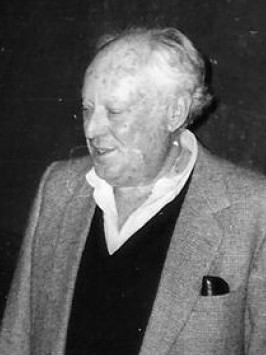
- Uris in 1989
- Born: August 3, 1924; Baltimore, Maryland, U.S.
- Died: June 21, 2003 (aged 78); Shelter Island, New York, U.S.
- Resting place: Quantico National Cemetery
- Occupation: Author
- Spouses: Betty Beck (m. 1945; div. 1968) Marjorie Edwards (m. 1968; died 1969) Jill Peabody (m. 1970; div. 1988)
- Children: 5
- Writing career
- Genre: Historical fiction
- Notable works: Exodus (1958); Mila 18 (1961); QB VII (1970)

Leon Marcus Uris (August 3, 1924 – June 21, 2003) was an American author of historical fiction. He wrote several bestselling novels, including Exodus (published in 1958), QB VII (published in 1970), and Trinity (published in 1976).

== Life and career ==
Uris was born in Baltimore, Maryland, the son of Jewish American parents Wolf William (Yiddish: וואָלף וויליאם יוריס; Belarusian: Вольф Уільям Урыс) and Anna (née Blumberg; Russian: ана блумберг урис; Yiddish: אננא בלאָמבערג יוריס) Uris. His father, born in Volkovysk in the Russian Empire (now Vawkavysk, Belarus), was a paperhanger, then a storekeeper. His mother was first-generation Russian American. William spent a year in Palestine after World War I before entering the United States. He derived his last name from Yerushalmi, meaning "man of Jerusalem". (His brother Aron, Leon's uncle, took the name Yerushalmi.) "He was basically a failure", Uris later said of his father. "I think his personality was formed by the harsh realities of being a Jew in Czarist Russia. I think failure formed his character, made him bitter."

Uris in Israel in the 1950s

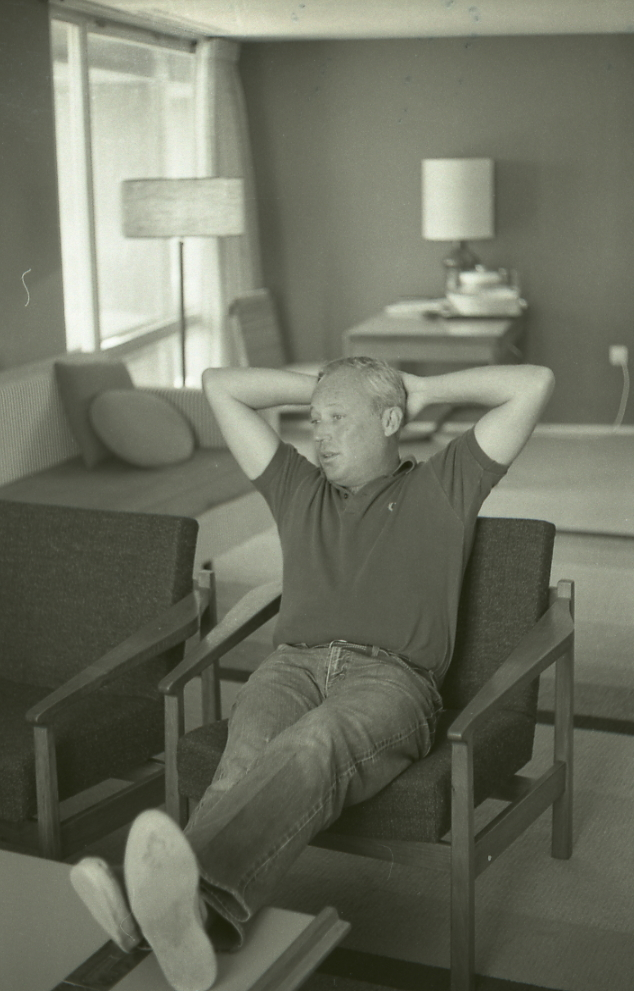
Leon Uris during a 1967 visit to Israel

At age six, Uris reportedly wrote an operetta inspired by the death of his dog. He attended schools in Norfolk, Virginia, and Baltimore, but never graduated from high school, and failed English three times. When he was 17 and in his senior year of high school, the Japanese attacked Pearl Harbor and he enlisted in the United States Marine Corps. He served in the South Pacific with the 2nd Battalion, 6th Marines Regiment, where he was stationed in New Zealand, and fought as a radioman in combat on Guadalcanal and Tarawa from 1942 through 1944. He was sent to the US after suffering from dengue fever, malaria and a recurrence of asthma that made him miss the devastation of his battalion at the Battle of Saipan, which was featured in Battle Cry. While recuperating from malaria in San Francisco, he met Betty Beck, a Marine sergeant; they married in 1945.

Released from service he worked for a newspaper, and wrote in his spare time. Esquire magazine bought an article in 1950, and he began to devote himself to writing more seriously. Drawing on his experiences in Guadalcanal and Tarawa, he produced the best-selling Battle Cry, a novel depicting the toughness and courage of U.S. Marines in the Pacific. He then went to Warner Brothers in Hollywood helping to write the eponymous movie which was extremely popular with the public, but not the critics. He went on to write The Angry Hills, a novel set in war-time Greece.

His best-known work may be Exodus, which was published in 1958. Most sources indicate that Uris, motivated by an intense interest in Israel, financed his research for the novel by selling the film rights in advance to MGM and by writing newspaper articles about the Sinai campaign, which is said to have involved two years of research, and thousands of interviews. (Note: Thirty years after the publication of Exodus, public relations man Edward Gottlieb claimed to have commissioned the novel to make the American public sympathetic toward Israel; however, research by Martin Kramer, a Middle East scholar, found no evidence that Gottlieb's claim was true.) It was a worldwide best-seller, translated into a dozen languages, and was made into a feature film in 1960, starring Paul Newman, directed by Otto Preminger, as well as into a short-lived Broadway musical, Ari, in 1971, for which Uris wrote the book and lyrics.

Exodus illustrated the history of Palestine from the late 19th century through the founding of the state of Israel in 1948. The novel blames the 1948 Palestinian expulsion and flight on the Palestinians, making it a work of Nakba denial. Exodus was also extraordinarily influential among Russian Refuseniks. Two typewritten Russian translations were circulated as samizdat – illegal, hand-copied works that were passed secretly from hand to hand – and the story was retold orally in the prison camps, with the oral version eventually being written in a notebook which was passed from one generation of prisoners to the next.

Uris's 1967 novel Topaz was adapted for the screen and directed by Alfred Hitchcock in 1969. His subsequent works included Mila 18, about the Warsaw Ghetto Uprising; Armageddon: A Novel of Berlin, a chronicle which ends with the lifting of the Berlin Blockade in 1949; Trinity, about Irish nationalism, and the sequel, Redemption, covering the early 20th century and World War I.

QB VII, about the role of a Polish doctor in a German concentration camp, is a dramatic four-part courtroom novel written by Uris that was published in 1970, highlighting the events leading to a libel trial in the United Kingdom. It is loosely based on a court case for defamation (Dering v Uris) that arose from Uris's earlier best-selling novel Exodus. It was Uris's second consecutive #1 New York Times Best Seller. The Haj was set in the history of the Middle East. He also wrote the screenplays for Battle Cry and Gunfight at the O.K. Corral.

== Personal life ==
Uris was married three times. His first wife was Betty Beck, whom he married in 1945. They had three children before divorcing in 1968. He then married Marjorie Edwards in 1968, who committed suicide by gunshot the following year.

His third and last wife was photographer Jill Peabody, daughter of Frances Gleason and Alfred Peabody of Boston. They had two children. They married in 1970, when Jill was 22 years old and he was 45. He and wife Jill worked together on his book Ireland: A Terrible Beauty, for which she provided illustrations and on Jerusalem: A Song of Songs. They divorced in 1988, and soon after Uris settled in New York City.

=== Political activities ===
Uris was a co-founder of the Writers and Artists for Peace in the Middle East, a pro-Israel group.

=== Death ===
Leon Uris died of kidney failure at his Long Island home on Shelter Island in 2003, aged 78. His papers can be found at the Harry Ransom Center, University of Texas in Austin, where the University of Texas Press published a literary biography about him. The collection includes all of Uris's novels, with the exception of The Haj and Mitla Pass, as well as manuscripts for the screenplay Gunfight at the O.K. Corral. He was survived by his five children and two grandchildren.

== Selected titles ==
- Battle Cry, 1953
- The Angry Hills, 1955
- Exodus, 1958
- Exodus Revisited, 1960 (GB title: In the Steps of Exodus)
- Mila 18, 1961
- Armageddon: A Novel of Berlin, 1963
- Topaz, 1967
- The Third Temple (with Strike Zion by William Stevenson), 1967
- QB VII, 1970
- Ireland: A Terrible Beauty, 1975 (with Jill Uris)
- Trinity, 1976
- Jerusalem: A Song of Songs, 1981 (with Jill Uris)
- The Haj, 1984
- Mitla Pass, 1988
- Redemption, 1995
- A God in Ruins, 1999
- O'Hara's Choice, 2003

== See also ==
- Dering v Uris
- List of bestselling novels in the United States
