= Dering v Uris =

1964 English libel suit

Dering v Uris and Others was a 1964 English libel suit brought by Polish-born Władysław Dering against the American writer Leon Uris. It was described at the time as the first war crimes trial held in Britain.

Dering alleged that Uris had libelled him in a footnote in his novel Exodus, which described his participation in medical experiments in Auschwitz concentration camp during the Holocaust. The case was tried in the High Court of Justice before Mr Justice Lawton and a jury between April and May 1964. On 6 May, the jury returned a verdict for Dering, but awarded him contemptuous damages of one halfpenny, the smallest coin in the currency. As a result, Dering became liable for the defendants' legal costs.

The trial attracted wide media coverage. In particular, The Times provided extensive coverage of the case, printing large portions of the testimony presented in court. Uris's novel QB VII and its 1974 miniseries adaptation are loosely based on this case.

== Background ==
Władysław Alexander Dering was a Polish doctor who was imprisoned at Auschwitz during the Second World War for resistance activities. After the war, he reached Britain, but was detained by the British government as an alleged war criminal, while the Polish government sought his extradition. In 1948, he was released, the Home Secretary having decided that there was insufficient evidence to support a prima facie case against him. Dering thereupon joined the Colonial Medical Service, running a hospital in Hargeisa, British Somaliland. For his services, he was appointed an OBE in 1960. The same year, he returned to England and established a medical practice in North London.

After his return, his family drew his attention to a passage in the novel Exodus by American author Leon Uris. The passage, on page 155, read:

Here in Block X Dr. Wirths used women as guinea pigs and Dr. Schumann sterilized by castration and X-ray and Clauberg removed ovaries and Dr. Dehring performed 17,000 'experiments' in surgery without anaesthetics.

Dering issued writs for libel against Uris, his British publishers William Kimber & Co Ltd, and the printers. The printers settled the case before the trial for £500 (equivalent to £8,855 in 2025) and an apology. Uris and William Kimber admitted the words at issue were defamatory against Dering, but pleaded that the words were true in substance and in fact, save for some particularized exceptions.

== The trial ==
The trial opened in the High Court of Justice in London on 13 April 1964 before Mr Justice Lawton and a jury. Colin Duncan QC (with Brian Neill) appeared for Dering, while Lord Gardiner (with David Hirst and Louis Blom-Cooper) represented the defendants.

In court, Dering denied having carried out experimental operations. He claimed he removed prisoners' sexual organs because Schumann had asked Dering to assist him by removing the organs. He did not feel he could refuse, because he thought it was better for him to perform the operations than if they were performed by an untrained person. Furthermore, he claimed the organs he removed were already damaged, and that he removed them for the benefit of the prisoners' health. He also claimed he feared for his life if he did not comply with Schumann's request. Finally, he denied having operated without anaesthetics, and claimed that of the 17,000 operations he performed at Auschwitz, only about 130 were not ordinary proper operations.

The defence admitted that the figure of 17,000 'experiments' was inflated, and that some anaesthetic was administered. However, they disputed Dering's claim that his life would have been in danger if he had not carried out the operations. They also disputed Dering's claim that the anaesthesia was effective. The defence presented a number of witnesses who had been operated upon by Dering, as well as prisoner-doctors who had worked with Dering. The doctors testified that they had refused the Nazi doctors' requests to assist them in their experiments, and had not been punished as a consequence. During the testimony of Dr Adélaïde Hautval, an imprisoned French psychiatrist who worked in the camp's hospital she testified that she had refused to assist the Nazi doctors in the experiments:

Gardiner: As a result were you shot?

Hautval: No

Gardiner: Were you punished in any way?

Hautval: No.

She then testified that she told Dr Wirths that performing the operations was against her conception of medicine.

Hautval: He asked me, "Cannot you see that these people are different from you?" and I answered him that there were several people different from me, beginning from him.

Gardiner: I shall not ask you again whether you were shot. Did Dr Wirths say anything further?

Hautval: He never said anything.

On May 7, the jury awarded Dering a halfpenny in damages, the smallest coin of the realm. Dering was refused permission to appeal. Since the publisher and author had paid a marginally larger token sum of £2 into court, Dering was liable for all the legal costs amounting to £25,000 from that point (equivalent to £442,734 in 2025), due to court rules. Dering died, however, soon afterwards in July 1965, leaving Kimber saddled with the heavy legal costs.

At a news conference held at the Howard Hotel by Uris and publisher Kimber, Uris is reported to have made a comment that future editions of Exodus would omit Dering's name.

The trial received extensive coverage. Breaking with tradition whereby it only reported judgments, The Times Law Report sent two reporters to report on the trial. The Times' reports were later published in book form (Auschwitz in England, 1965). It was said that the newspaper's circulation rose for the first time since the end of the Second World War as a result of its coverage.

Uris had copied his data from Underground: The Story of a People by Joseph Tenenbaum when he referred to doctors working in Auschwitz.

Lawton, who had flirted with fascism in the 1930s, described Hautval in regard to her testimony as "perhaps one of the most impressive and courageous women who had ever given evidence in the courts of this country".

When the files of the United Nations War Crimes Commission were unsealed for the first time in 1987, it was revealed that the commission had concluded there was a "prima facie" case to charge Dering with war crimes. One witness, Dr. Jan Olbrych, told the commission he personally witnessed Dering castrate scores of men. Another former Auschwitz inmate, Józef Cyrankiewicz, who would serve as Poland's prime minister from 1947 to 1970, testified that Dering "treated the prisoners in a brutal way. It was common knowledge that Dering carried out experimental operations in Block 10."

== See also ==
- Just following orders
