= Don Peppers =

- Occupations: Author, advertising executive

Don Peppers is an American advertising executive, author, and was a founding partner of Peppers & Rogers Group.

== Biography ==
Peppers graduated from the United States Air Force Academy in 1972 with a B.S. degree in astronautical engineering, and earned a master's degree in public affairs with a concentration in foreign policy from Princeton's School of Public and International Affairs in 1974.

Peppers's career in advertising began at Saatchi and Saatchi in 1982 as an account executive. Two years later, he moved to Levine, Huntley, Schmidt & Beaver, where he was new business director and gained a reputation as a rainmaker. In 1988, he moved to Lintas as an executive vice president and in 1990 to Chiat/Day/Mojo as worldwide head of new business development.

In finding new business, Peppers gained a reputation for his self-promotion and outrageous tactics, such as sending flowers to prospective clients and putting life-sized cardboard cutouts of himself outside their homes, according to The New York Times. In 1995, he drew on these experiences in a book on sales techniques, Life's a Pitch...Then You Buy.

Peppers and Martha Rogers founded the consulting business Peppers & Rogers Group together in 1992. Bob Dorf joined the firm in 1993 and became its president. The company was headquartered in Stamford, Connecticut before moving to Norwalk, Connecticut in 2000. At that time it had 178 employees in Connecticut and 218 worldwide. TeleTech Holdings, Inc. purchased an eighty percent stake in the company in 2010.

Peppers was named to the first "Forty Under Forty" list published by Crain's New York Business in 1988.

== Partial bibliography ==
- The One to One Future: Building Relationships One Customer at a Time (1993) with Martha Rogers
- Life's a Pitch...Then You Buy (1995)
- Enterprise One to One: Tools for competing in the Interactive Age (Doubleday, 1997) with Martha Rogers (professor)
