= Douglas S. Cramer =

American television producer (1931–2021)

Douglas Schoolfield Cramer (August 22, 1931 – June 4, 2021) was an American television producer who worked for Paramount Television and Spelling Television, producing series such as Mission: Impossible, The Brady Bunch, and Dynasty.

== Career ==
Cramer, a native of Louisville, Kentucky and graduate of Walnut Hills High School in Cincinnati, Ohio, began his career in advertising, serving as a broadcast supervisor on Lever Brothers and General Foods programs at Ogilvy & Mather in New York City. In 1962, he became Director of Program Planning at ABC Television. In 1966, he became vice president of television program development at 20th Century Fox; he later became executive vice president in charge of production for Paramount Television in 1968, in which role he was responsible for such television shows as Star Trek, The Odd Couple, The Brady Bunch, and Mission: Impossible. In 1971, Cramer left Paramount to form his own production company, which had produced the Wonder Woman television series.

Cramer joined Aaron Spelling's production company in 1976. Cramer was an executive producer on the 1980s series Dynasty, its spin-off series The Colbys, and the 1991 miniseries Dynasty: The Reunion.

Cramer produced 20 of the 22 miniseries adaptations of Danielle Steel's novels; the exceptions being Jewels (1992) and the first, Now and Forever (1983).

Cramer was nominated for an Emmy Award for Outstanding Special – Drama or Comedy in 1975 for QB VII, and again for Outstanding Drama Series in 1982 for Dynasty.

Cramer provided audio commentary for the pilot episode of the Wonder Woman television series starring Lynda Carter (who joined him on the commentary) on the Region 1 DVD for the first season.

== Art collection ==
Cramer was one of America's leading collectors of contemporary art; works from his collections, including pieces by Roy Lichtenstein, Ellsworth Kelly, and Mark di Suvero, have been shown at some of the leading art museums in the United States, and have been auctioned at Sotheby's and Christie's (1997, 2012). In May 1997, Cramer sold 22 contemporary sculptures at Christie's in New York, for a total of $2.9 million, with proceeds of the sale going to the Douglas S. Cramer Foundation. In 2008, Cramer sold Man-Crazy Nurse #2 by Richard Prince for $7.4 million.

While working in New York City, he starting buying prints by 20th-century Modernists, then by the younger artists there who were friends with Jim Dine, Jasper Johns, Roy Lichtenstein, Ellsworth Kelly, Agnes Martin, Eva Hesse, and others. In Los Angeles, Cramer started collecting Californian artists. He became one of the founders of the Los Angeles Museum of Contemporary Art and was president of its board of trustees from 1990 to 1993. At MOCA alone, he spearheaded art auctions, donated major artworks, and provided funds for a 1997 Ellsworth Kelly retrospective. He ended a 13-year tenure at MOCA in 1996, rotating off the board in accordance with a policy enacted in 1993. He donated hundreds of artworks to museums, including sculptures by Anthony Caro and Richard Serra to Tate Modern in London and works by Kelly, Joel Shapiro, and Andy Warhol to the Museum of Modern Art in New York City, where he was a member of the board from 1993 on.

Cramer also established the Douglas S. Cramer Foundation with two buildings and five different exhibition spaces on his 420-acre ranch, called La Quinta Norte, in the Santa Ynez Valley, near Los Olivos, California.

== Personal life ==
From 1966 to 1972, Cramer was married to famed Los Angeles Times gossip columnist Joyce Haber. Together they had two children, Douglas S. Cramer III and Courtney Cramer. In 1994 (the year after Haber's death), Cramer attempted to produce a fictionalized, two-act play about the marriage, entitled The Last Great Dish.

Cramer moved to the east coast in 1997, subsequently came out as gay, and, in 2006, married artist Hubert "Hugh" Bush. In the later years of Cramer's life, the couple resided in Miami Beach, Florida.

On June 4, 2021, Cramer died from heart and kidney failure at his home on Martha's Vineyard, at the age of 89.

== Selected credits ==
- Star Trek (1968–1969), 24 episodes
- The Cat Creature (1973, TV Movie)
- QB VII (1974, miniseries)
- Wonder Woman (1975–1977)
- Who Is the Black Dahlia? (1975, TV movie)
- The San Pedro Beach Bums (1977)
- The Love Boat (1977–1986)
- Dynasty (1981–1989)
- The Colbys (1985–1987)
- Nightingales (1989)
- Dynasty: The Reunion (1991, TV Movie)
- Family Album (1994, miniseries)
- The Ring (1996, miniseries)
