= Alexander Ector Orr =

American businessman (1831–1914)

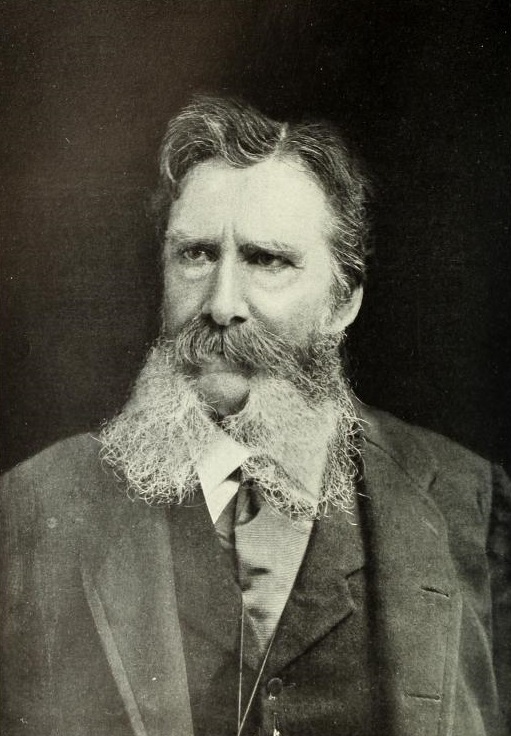
- Orr in 1904
- Born: March 2, 1831; Strabane, Ulster, Ireland
- Died: June 3, 1914 (aged 83); New York City, New York, U.S.
- Resting place: Green-Wood Cemetery
- Relatives: Charles Alexander Munn Sr. (nephew); Gurnee Munn (grandnephew)

Signature
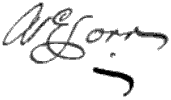

Alexander Ector Orr (1831–1914) was an Ulster-born American businessman known as the "father of the New York City Subway".

== Early life ==
Orr was born in Strabane, County Tyrone, to William and Mary Orr née Moore. His father was a merchant, and Orr claimed descent from Clan MacGregor. His parents hoped for him to join the British East India Company, but when he was 15, Orr suffered an accident which left him on crutches for three years and hindered him from joining the EIC. His doctor prescribed a sea voyage to heal, over the course of which Orr visited several seaboard cities of the Southern United States. Orr was sufficiently impressed by the United States that emigrated. He arrived in New York in 1851, where he "at once took up a commercial life".

== Career ==
Upon arrival in New York, Orr obtained a position in the office of a South Street shipping and commission merchant. He later served in the office of Wallace & Wicks.

His marriage to Juliet Dows significantly enhanced his prominence in New York and the city of Brooklyn, where he moved with Juliet. He joined his father-in-law's firm, David Dows & Co., as a clerk in the same year. Dows & Co. was the largest east-coast receiver of grain sent to New York from Chicago. In 1859, he joined the New York Produce Exchange as a member. In 1861, he became a partner at Dows & Co.

Once established, Orr invited several of his family members to join him in the United States. His nephews, Charles Alexander Munn and Noel Spencer Munn, arrived from Londonderry in 1870, and became the Dows organization's representatives in Chicago. This business was eventually spun off into the closely related Munn, Orr, & Co., which dealt in meatpacking and produce. Orr became very wealthy through his business interests, and served as director of numerous large corporations, including the Mechanics National Bank, National Bank of Commerce, Rock Island and Pacific Railroad, and the Metropolitan Life Insurance Company. He served on the boards of 29 corporations over the course of his career. He was president of the Produce Exchange in 1887 and 1888, and president of the New York Chamber of Commerce in the years between 1894 and 1899.

In 1906, after the Armstrong investigation forced John A. McCall to resign as president of the New York Life Insurance Company, Orr was elected to the position, which he served 18 months in.

=== Public service and philanthropy ===
In 1875, Orr was appointed to the Canal Commission by Governor Samuel J. Tilden, which exposed the corrupt "Canal Ring". He was an elector for Tilden in the 1876 presidential election. Orr was a lifelong "goo-goo" and a supporter of civil service reform, encouraging Seth Low and Alfred C. Chapin's efforts towards those causes in pre-consolidation Brooklyn. He also served on the arbitration board which dealt with contractors building the Brooklyn Bridge.

In 1894, he was appointed president of the Board of Rapid Transit Commissioners, the body created by the Rapid Transit Act of 1894 to plan the New York City Subway. In this position, he arranged much of the financing for the construction of the subway system. In 1900, he secured a final plan and contract for the system; he presided over its groundbreaking on March 24, 1900. Ten years after he joined the body, on October 27, 1904, Orr, along with chief engineer William Barclay Parsons, contractor John B. McDonald, and fellow commissioners August Belmont and John Starin, spoke at the inauguration of the Interborough Rapid Transit Company's main line.

Orr occupied leading roles in the Society for the Reformation of Juvenile Delinquents, the Long Island State Hospital, the Anti-Vice Commission, the American Geographical Society, the Academy of Music, and the Green-Wood Cemetery Corporation. A member of the Protestant Episcopal Church, he was one of the incorporators of Garden City Cathedral and the treasurer of the Diocese of Long Island. His club memberships included the Down Town Association, the City Club, the Hamilton Club of Brooklyn, and the Atlantic Yacht Club.

== Personal life ==
In 1858, Orr married Juliet Buckingham Dows, the daughter of grain dealer Ammi Dows. Juliet died in 1872, and Orr remarried Margaret Shippen Luquer in 1873. Margaret died a year before Orr, in 1913.

He had three daughters with his first wife: Jane, Mary, and Juliet. Juliet married the painter Albert Henry Munsell, and Jane married the cleric and Assyriologist James Buchanan Nies. His grandson through Juliet, Alexander Ector Orr Munsell (1895-1983), gave up most his inheritance in order to become a communist activist. Orr's nephew, Charles Alexander Munn, married the Chicago heiress Carrie Louise Gurnee and became one of the founders of Palm Beach.

The Orrs built a large house on Montauk which later became known as Tick Hall. The estate, the greatest of Montauk's so-called "seven sisters", was sited by Frederick Law Olmsted and designed by Stanford White. Dick Cavett later lived at the house between 1967 and 2017.

Upon his death in 1914, Orr's estate was valued at more than $10 million. He was interred at Green-Wood Cemetery.

== Legacy ==
Although he is not a well-known figure in the 21st century, Orr was widely respected in his time and has been described as the "Father of the New York subway". Upon his death, the New York Times editorial board wrote that:

To him more than to any other one man were due the conception and planning of subway communication, which has already become the greatest municipal achievement of the time, and which is destined to still greater utility, affecting millions yet unborn, but which at the time that he first engaged in the study of it was so doubtful a matter that he was deemed a “dreamer” for the faith that he had in it. A dreamer he was not, but a seer, with remarkable power to carry into effect what he saw. Withal a modest, simple, kindly, and loyal man, who made sweeter the lives of those whose privilege it was to be associated with him.

— The New York Times, June 5, 1914

In December 2024, a Blue Plaque in honor of Orr was unveiled in Strabane.
