= Alexander Orr =

Alexander Orr may refer to:

- Alexander D. Orr (1761–1835), American farmer and politician from Maysville, Kentucky
- Alexander Ector Orr (1831–1914), businessman in New York City, influential in the building of the New York City Subway system
