= Carrie Nye =

American actress (1936–2006)

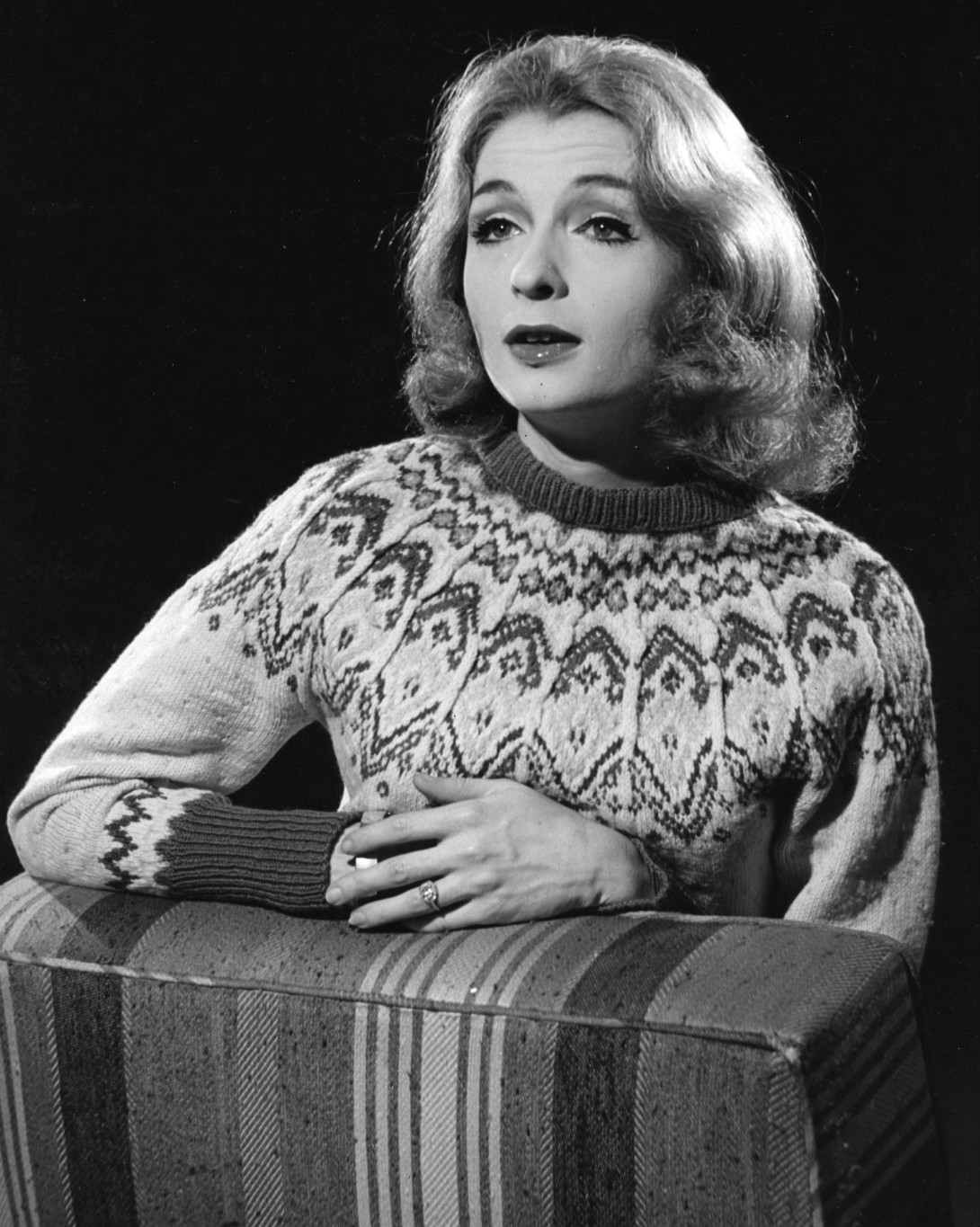
- Nye in Mary, Mary (1961)
- Born: Carolyn Nye McGeoy; October 14, 1936; Greenwood, Mississippi, U.S.
- Died: July 14, 2006 (aged 69); New York City, U.S.
- Education: Stephens College; Yale University
- Occupation: Actress
- Years active: 1955–2004
- Spouse: Dick Cavett (m. 1964)

Carolyn Nye McGeoy (October 14, 1936 – July 14, 2006), known professionally as Carrie Nye, was an American actress. In her career spanning 32 years, she was nominated for a Tony Award in 1965, a Primetime Emmy Award in 1980, and a Drama Desk Award in 1981.

== Early life ==
Nye was born Carolyn Nye McGeoy on October 14, 1936, in Greenwood, Mississippi, the only child of Frank Rice McGeoy Jr., a cotton planter and president of the Bank of Greenwood, and Emma Evelynne (Reddett) McGeoy. Nye was interested in dancing when she was a child. She was trained in ballet and planned on a career as a dancer. Her focus changed when a summer camp activity gave her a part in a play by Tennessee Williams. "That did it", she said.

She attended Greenwood High School, Stephens College in Columbia, Missouri, and the Yale School of Drama, graduating in 1959. She met Dick Cavett at Yale. They married in 1964.

Nye was a member of the Delta Debutante Society, and she made her debut in Greenville, Mississippi.

== Career ==
Most of Nye's work was on the stage. She joined the Williamstown Theatre Festival in 1955 and portrayed a number of roles at the festival through the 1960s and 1970s. Among her credits were the leads in The Skin of Our Teeth and A Streetcar Named Desire. She was in the American Shakespeare Festival that performed Troilus and Cressida at the White House during the Kennedy administration.

She made her debut on Broadway in 1960 in A Second String. The following year she portrayed Tiffany Richards in the original cast of Mary, Mary. She received a Tony Award nomination in 1965 for her portrayal of Helen Walsingham in Half a Sixpence. She appeared in two more productions on Broadway during the 1960s, A Very Rich Woman (1965) and Cop-Out (1969).

Nye made her feature film debut in The Group (1966), the film adaptation of Mary McCarthy's novel. Other film appearances included The Seduction of Joe Tynan (1979), the classic horror film Creepshow (1982), Too Scared to Scream (1985), and the Shelley Long comedy Hello Again (1987).

Nye was featured in a number of television movies during the 1970s, including Screaming Skull (1973) and The Users (1978). She also acted in the television movie Divorce His, Divorce Hers (1973), which starred Elizabeth Taylor and Richard Burton. Nye wrote a humorous essay that year published in Time about the experience. In 1978, Nye was a semi-regular panelist on the PBS quiz show We Interrupt This Week. She received a Primetime Emmy Award nomination in 1980 for her portrayal of Tallulah Bankhead in the television film The Scarlett O'Hara War. That same year she returned to Broadway to perform the role of Lorraine Sheldon in a revival of The Man Who Came to Dinner. She was nominated for a Drama Desk Award for her performance.

In 1984, Nye was cast on the daytime soap opera Guiding Light as Susan Piper, an unscrupulous real estate agent going to great lengths, including murder, trying to reclaim a cottage that harbors a deep secret. Her portrayal of the villainous character proved popular for some time, culminating in a location shoot in Barbados, ending with a memorable death scene where she fell into quicksand.

When Nye's friend Ellen Weston became head writer of Guiding Light in 2003, she created another character for Nye, the mysterious Caroline Carruthers. Despite acclaim for Nye's performance, this storyline was unpopular, changing history for several of the show's core characters (whom she had crossed paths with in her first stint) and Nye's character was written off after six months.

== Personal life and death ==
Nye was married to Dick Cavett, from June 4, 1964, until her death. They met at Yale and had no children. Nye and Cavett bought Tick Hall, a house in Montauk, New York, designed by Stanford White. It burned down in 1997, but with the assistance of architects and preservationists, she and Cavett built an exact replica of the house. Their accomplishment became the subject of a documentary film From the Ashes: The Life and Times of Tick Hall (2003).

Nye died of lung cancer on July 14, 2006, aged 69, at home in Manhattan.

== Awards and nominations ==
Year	Award	Category	Nominated work	Result	Ref.
1981	Drama Desk Awards	Outstanding Featured Actress in a Play	The Man Who Came to Dinner	Nominated	
1980	Primetime Emmy Awards	Outstanding Supporting Actress in a Limited Series or a Special	The Scarlett O'Hara War	Nominated	
1965	Tony Awards	Best Supporting or Featured Actress in a Musical	Half a Sixpence	Nominated	
