= Adélaïde Hautval =

French psychiatrist, Righteous Among the Nations (1906–1988)

- Born: Marthe Adélaïde Haas; 1 January 1906; Le Hohwald, German Empire
- Died: 12 October 1988 (aged 82); Groslay, Val-d'Oise, France
- Other name: Haïdi
- Education: University of Strasbourg (Doctorate, 1933)
- Occupation: Psychiatrist
- Known for: Opposing Nazi medical practices at Auschwitz; Righteous Among the Nations
- Criminal penalty: Imprisonment in Ravensbrück and Auschwitz
- Awards: Righteous Among the Nations (1965); Chevalier of the Légion d'honneur

Adélaïde Haas Hautval (1 January 1906 – 17 October 1988) was a French physician and psychiatrist who resisted Nazi medical practices during the Holocaust. Arrested in 1942 after crossing the demarcation line without authorisation, she was interned in several camps, including Pithiviers and Beaune-la-Rolande, before being deported in January 1943 to Auschwitz concentration camp as part of the Convoi des 31000. At Auschwitz, Hautval provided medical care to Jewish prisoners and refused to participate in forced sterilisation experiments. She was later transferred to Ravensbrück, where she remained imprisoned until liberation in 1945.

After the war, she resumed her medical career and testified in the 1964 British libel trial Dering v Uris, offering crucial evidence concerning medical crimes at Auschwitz. In 1965, she was recognised by Yad Vashem as one of the Righteous Among the Nations for her moral courage and efforts to protect Jewish lives.

== Early life ==
Marthe Adélaïde Haas was born on 1 January 1906 in Le Hohwald, a village in the Alsace region of eastern France. She was the seventh and youngest child of Philippe Haas, a Protestant minister active in the region during the 1890s, and Sophie Lydie Kuntz, daughter of Jean-Hippolyte Kuntz, proprietor of the Grand Hotel Du Hohwald. In 1910 the family moved to Guebwiller. Known affectionately as "Heidi" in childhood, she later adopted the name "Hautval" in memory of her native village. She was raised in a devout Protestant family, and later attributed her moral opposition to Nazi persecution to her Christian convictions.

She studied medicine at the University of Strasbourg and specialised in psychiatry, training in various institutions across France and Switzerland. During the evacuation of Alsace in 1939, she was relocated to the Dordogne region with much of the local population. She continued her psychiatric work at the Lannemezan facility in the Hautes-Pyrénées.

== Arrest and imprisonment ==
In 1942, following the death of her mother in Paris, Hautval sought permission to cross the demarcation line to attend the funeral in her native Alsace. During a following journey on 29 May 1942, near the boundary between the free and occupied zone, she was arrested by French gendarmes at Vierzon for lacking the required Ausweis (travel authorisation) and transferred to German custody.

While imprisoned in Bourges, Hautval was held alongside Jewish detainees and openly expressed solidarity with them, repeatedly defending them before the Gestapo. As an act of protest, she initially fashioned a makeshift yellow badge for herself; in response, the Gestapo forced her to wear an official yellow star and an armband identifying her as a "friend of the Jews". She was then transferred through a series of internment sites for Jewish deportees, first to Pithiviers internment camp, then two months later to Beaune-la-Rolande internment camp, before being held in a prison in Orléans. In November 1942, she was sent to the Fort de Romainville. In January 1943, she was deported via the Compiègne transit camp to Auschwitz concentration camp, together with 230 other French female political prisoners, in a transport later known as the Convoi des 31000.

Upon arrival at Auschwitz, camp doctor Eduard Wirths assigned Hautval to practise gynaecology. She complied initially but withdrew when she discovered the department was conducting forced sterilisation experiments on Jewish women, using x-rays and surgical removal of the ovaries. She was referred to by fellow prisoners as "the saint", according to later survivor testimony, for secretly providing medical aid to Jewish prisoners in her barracks, despite the risks involved.

In August 1944, she was transferred to Ravensbrück concentration camp, where she remained imprisoned until the arrival of Allied forces in April 1945.

== Later life and legacy ==
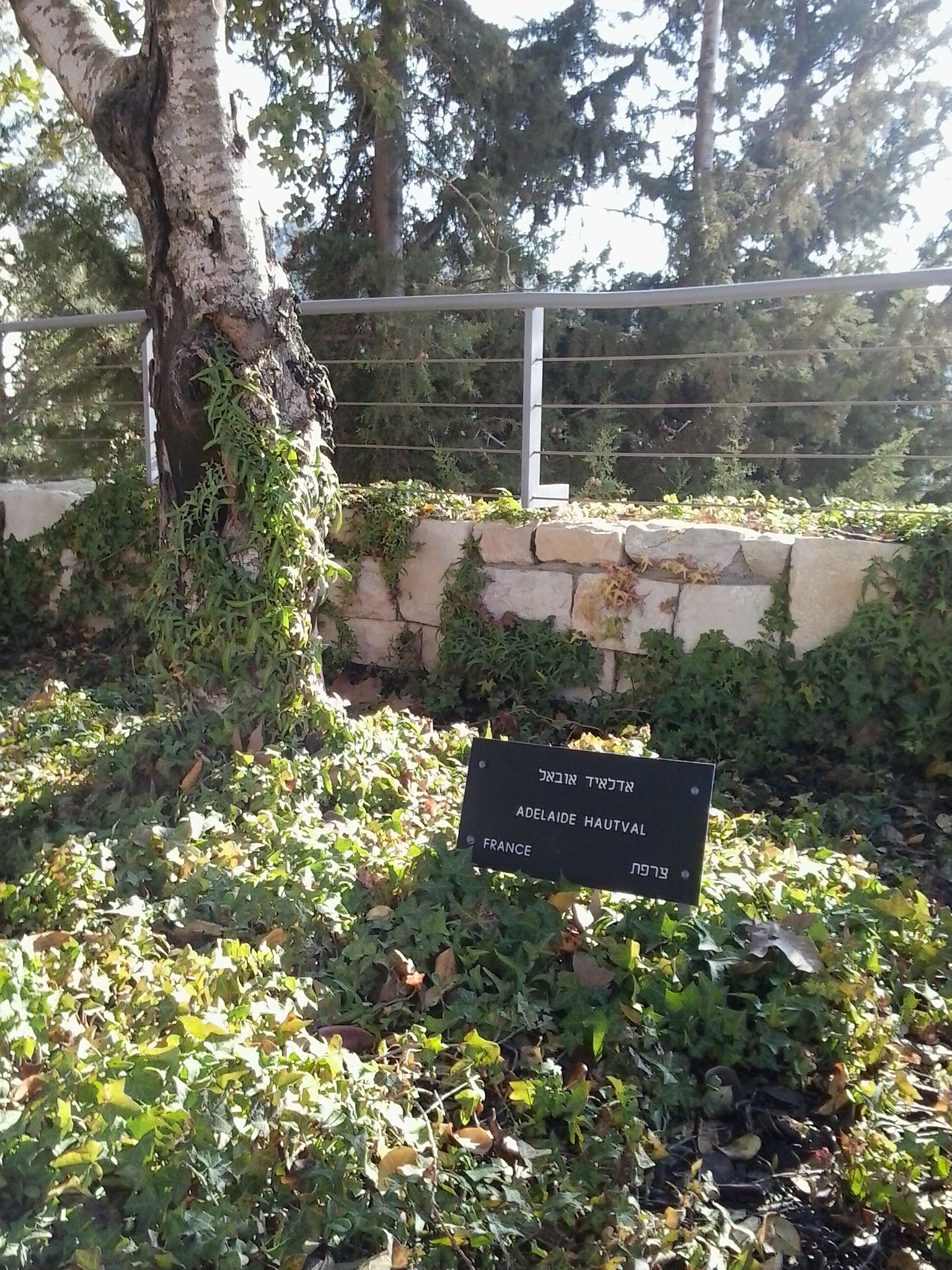
The tree planted at Yad Vashem honoring Adélaïde Hautval

Following liberation, Hautval returned to France and resumed her medical practice. In 1964, she gave testimony in the British High Court during the Dering v Uris libel trial. The Polish doctor Władysław Dering had sued the novelist Leon Uris for naming him in the book Exodus as having conducted medical experiments in Auschwitz. Dering argued that disobedience would have led to execution, but Hautval, under oath, testified that she had disobeyed orders and survived nonetheless. Her testimony played a critical role in the case. Justice Frederick Lawton later described her as "perhaps one of the most impressive and courageous women who had ever given evidence in the courts of this country".

In 1965, Hautval was honoured by Yad Vashem as one of the Righteous Among the Nations, acknowledging her exceptional moral courage in protecting Jewish lives under the Nazi regime.

Later in life, Hautval was diagnosed with Parkinson disease. In 1987, she completed her memoirs, which were published posthumously in 1991 as Médecine et crimes contre l'humanité ("Medicine and Crimes Against Humanity"). She died by suicide in 1988.

In 1993, a street in front of the University of Strasbourg's medical faculty was renamed in her honour. In 2015, the Parisian hospital formerly named after Charles Richet was renamed Adélaïde-Hautval Hospital, recognising her contributions and correcting the historical record.

== Memorials ==
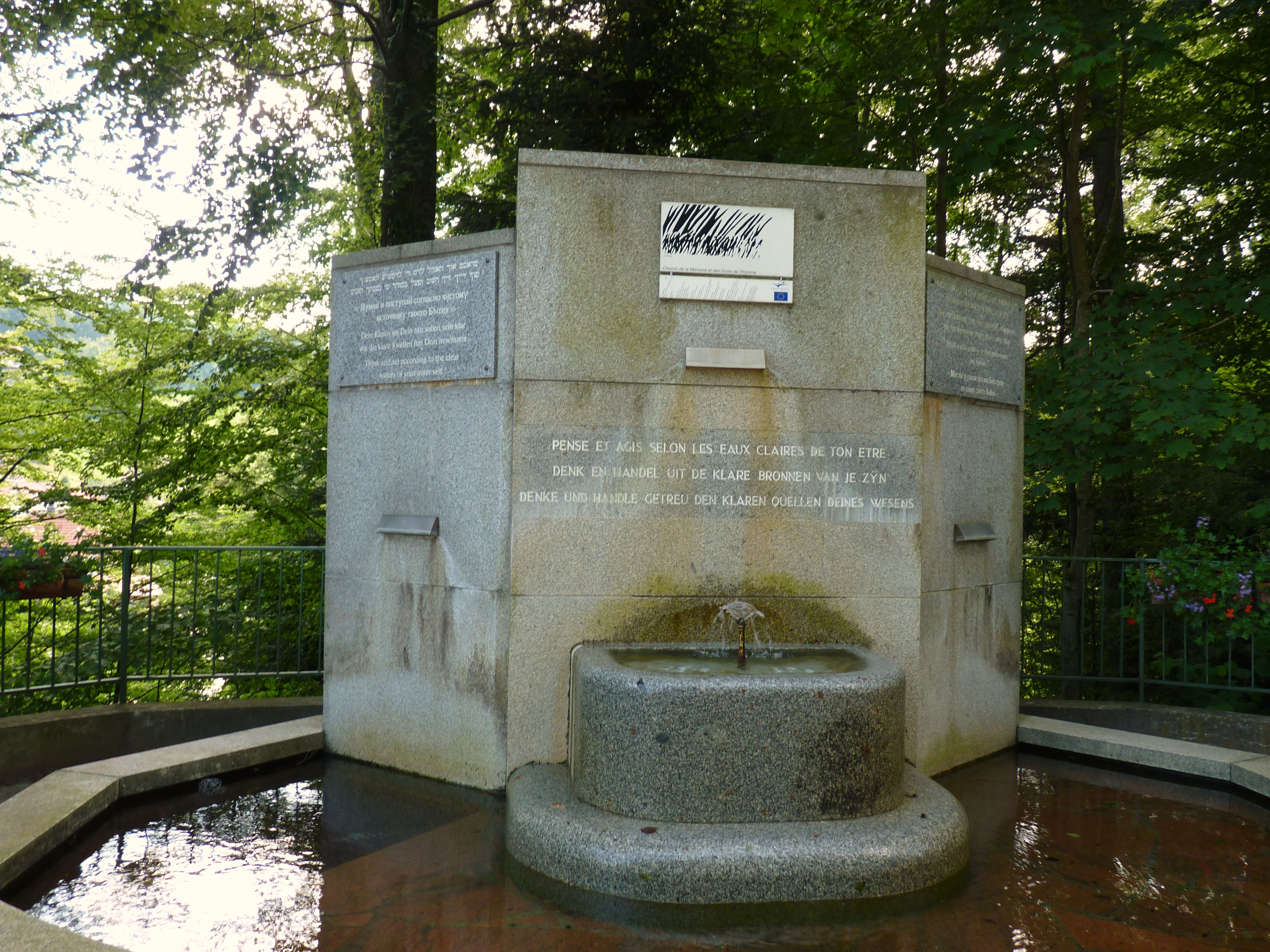
The Fontaine Haïdi Hautval in Le Hohwald (1991)

On 11 November 1991, a fountain and memorial stone known as the Fontaine Haïdi Hautval (The Haïdi Hautval Fountain) was erected in her birthplace of Le Hohwald. Its face bears the inscription Pense et agis selon les eaux claires de ton être ("Think and act according to the clear waters of your being") one of Adélaïde Hautval's favorite maxims.

== See also ==
- Convoi des 31000
