= Joyce Haber =

American novelist

Joyce Haber (December 28, 1930 – July 29, 1993) was one of Hollywood's last powerful gossip columnists, "capable of canonizing a film or destroying a star". Upon graduating from the New York Barnard College with a B.A. Degree in English in 1953, she was hired by Time Magazine as their Hollywood Reporter. Starting in May 1966 she was hired by the Los Angeles Times as a reporter. In September 1967 she started writing her gossip column succeeding Hedda Hopper, who died in 1966.

In 1970, as retaliation for American actress Jean Seberg's public support of the Black Panther Party, Haber agreed to plant an unfounded rumour in her column that Seberg's pregnancy resulted from a liaison with a leader of the Black Panthers. Seberg's premature infant daughter died two days after birth and thereafter suffered from depression, which ultimately led to her suicide in 1979.

Haber left the Los Angeles Times in 1975 to complete her roman a clef book titled The Users. It was her only novel, rose to the top of the New York Times Bestseller List, and was made into a tele-film with the same name.

== Personal life ==
Haber was married to television producer Douglas S. Cramer from 1964–1972. Together they had two children, Douglas S. Cramer III and Courtney Cramer.

In 1994 (after Haber's death), Cramer attempted to produce The Last Great Dish, a two-act play about their marriage, but never got it off the ground.

== Death ==
On July 29, 1993, Haber died of kidney and liver failure at Cedars-Sinai Medical Center in Los Angeles, having been admitted a couple weeks prior. She was 62 years old at the time.

== Filmography ==
Year	Title	Role	Notes
1971	The Christian Licorice Store	Hollywood Party Guest #3	
1972	Conquest of the Planet of the Apes	Zelda	(final film role)
