= The Users (film) =

1978 television film directed by Joseph Hardy

- VHS cover
- Genre: Drama
- Based on: The Users by Joyce Haber
- Written by: Dominick Dunne; Robert J. Shaw
- Directed by: Joseph Hardy
- Starring: Jaclyn Smith; Tony Curtis; Red Buttons; Alan Feinstein; Joan Fontaine; John Forsythe; George Hamilton; Darren McGavin; Carrie Nye; Michelle Phillips
- Music by: Maurice Jarre
- Country of origin: United States
- Original language: English

Production
- Producer: Dominick Dunne
- Cinematography: Richard L. Rawlings
- Editor: Byron 'Buzz' Brandt
- Running time: 150 minutes
- Production company: Aaron Spelling Productions

Original release
- Network: ABC
- Release: October 1, 1978

The Users is a 1978 American made-for-television drama film directed by Joseph Hardy. The film, whose executive producer was Aaron Spelling, is based on a Joyce Haber novel released in the same year. The film focuses on the insiders of the Hollywood film industry.

== Plot ==
Elena Scheider (Smith) is a prostitute with class who is hired by film producer Adam Baker (Hamilton) to seduce Randy Brent (Curtis), an actor who is working in Phoenix on his latest film The Last Man, presumably, a post-apocalyptic, dystopian thriller film. Since the death of his wife, who committed suicide by overdose seven years ago, Randy has retired from the screen and he is now seen as a has-been. The Last Man is his first venture since the tragedy, but he has trouble shooting the love scenes. Elena successfully seduces him and he soon falls in love with her. It does not take long before she moves in with him in his mansion in Hollywood.

In Hollywood, she is immediately welcomed by all the insiders, including Randy's celebrity daughter Marina (Phillips) and wealthy socialite Grace St. George (Fontaine). Elena and Marina become close friends and Marina tells her about her disastrous love life, which exists mainly of movie producers, who use her for their own gain. The only man she trusts is a man married to a powerful woman. Elena later learns from her masseur Harvey Parkes (Baseleon) that the married man is Adam, whose intimidating wife Nancy (Nye) is aware of the affair.

It soon becomes clear to Elena that everyone in Hollywood is using each other for their own career. She spontaneously marries Randy in Las Vegas, Nevada and turns to Grace for help to become a Hollywood insider as well, visiting the right parties and wearing the right clothes. Meanwhile, Randy's film is nearing its release. Marty Lesky (Feinstein) is determined on releasing it as a made-for-TV movie, claiming it is too bad for a theatrical release. Elena and Marina try to prevent Randy from fading from the screen again and try to get him his next movie role before the film comes out.

Elena seduces Warren Ambrose (Buttons), a powerful studio owner whose newest project Rogue's Gallery promises to be a huge success. The film makers are reluctant to hire Randy, claiming Robert Redford or Paul Newman are more suited for the role. Warren suggests Elena talk to Reade Jamieson (Forsythe), the wealthy executive producer. They immediately feel attracted to each other and Reade tells her the man who is casting the roles is Henry Waller (McGavin), the screenwriter. She returns home and catches Randy with Andrew Lyons (Douglas Warner), a screenwriter who wants to cast Randy in his newest project.

Elena, furious to find out this way about her husband's sexuality, leaves him. However, when she finds out that he tried to commit suicide later that evening, she takes him back. Meanwhile, Marina finds out Adam is just like any other man, when Nancy reveals that he only slept with her so she would play the female lead in Rogue's Gallery. With the help from Grace, Elena throws Henry a party, but he refuses to come, explaining he will not consider casting Randy. She visits him in his hotel and is successful in seducing him. She spends the night with him, thereby ensuring Randy the lead role. She returns home the next day and splits with Randy after giving him the news. In the end, Rogue's Gallery is a contender for the 51st Academy Awards. Randy and Marina are both very famous again and Elena and Reade are happily married.

== Cast ==
- Jaclyn Smith as Elena Scheider, a prostitute who dreams of a glamorous life in Hollywood.
- Tony Curtis as Randall 'Randy' Brent, an actor who was once very famous, but is now a has-been.
- John Forsythe as Reade Jamieson, a powerful business magnate who is the executive producer of Rogue's Gallery.
- Michelle Phillips as Marina Brent, Randy's daughter who is an actress as well.
- George Hamilton as Adam Baker, a film producer who has an affair with Marina.
- Joan Fontaine as Grace St. George, a wealthy socialite who knows all the gossip in Hollywood.
- Darren McGavin as Henry Waller, the writer of the novel Rogue's Gallery and its screenplay.
- Red Buttons as Warren Ambrose, the owner of a film studio who uses his position to seduce women.
- Alan Feinstein as Marty Lesky, a press agent and lawyer who is known as an infamous womanizer.
- Carrie Nye as Nancy Baker, Adam's wealthy and intimidating wife, who is aware of his affair with Marina.
- Michael Baseleon as Harvey Parkes, the Brent's masseur who knows all the latest gossip.
- John Pleshette as Kip Nathan, the director of The Last Man.
- Joanne Linville as Elena's Mother, who is under the care of Elena since her health worsened.
- Douglas Warner as Andrew Lyons, a gay screenwriter who has affairs with several powerful Hollywood men.
- Judy Landers as Merry Redfield, an aspiring actress.

== Reception ==
The Users was received with mixed reviews. The Video Movie Guide gave the film two out of five stars, praising its cast but called it a 'standard television production' with 'standard dialogue'.
