= Adélaïde-Hautval Hospital =

Former public hospital in Villiers-le-Bel, France (1965–2019)

- AP-HP
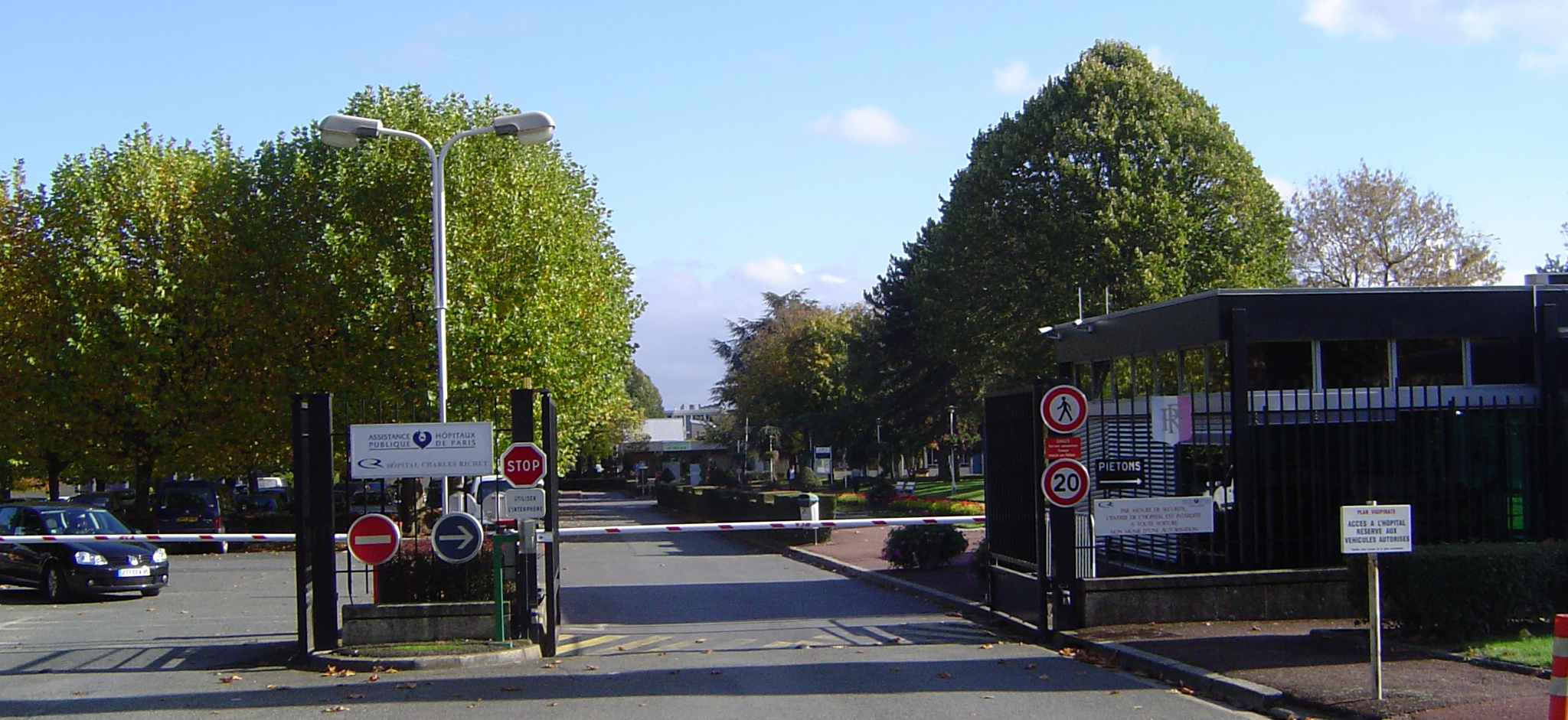
- Entrance of the hospital in 2009, when it was still named Hôpital Charles-Richet

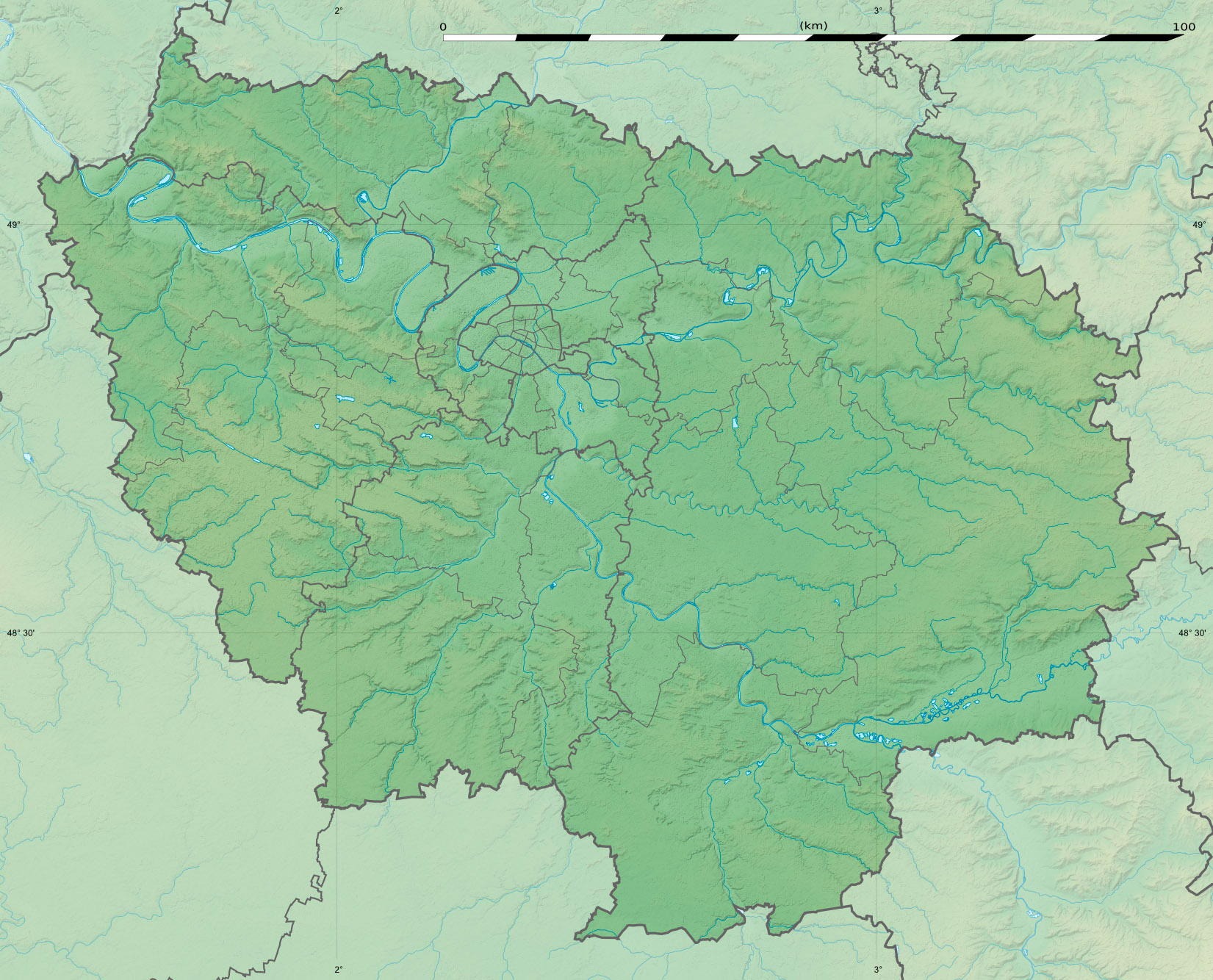
- Location in Île-de-France

Geography
- Location: Rue du Haut-du-Roy, Villiers-le-Bel, Île-de-France, France
- Coordinates: 49.0094°N 2.3911°E

Organisation
- Care system: Public
- Type: Geriatric hospital
- Affiliated university: AP-HP

Services
- Emergency department: No
- Beds: 285

History
- Former name: Hôpital Charles-Richet (1965–2015)
- Constructed: 1965
- Opened: 1965
- Closed: 2017 (Note: The hospital officially closed in March 2017. The premises continued to house an EHPAD, which closed on 15 October 2021.)

Links
- Lists: Hospitals in France

Adélaïde-Hautval Hospital (French: Hôpital Adélaïde-Hautval) was a public hospital in Villiers-le-Bel, in the Val-d'Oise department of France. Operated by the Assistance publique – Hôpitaux de Paris (AP-HP), it opened in 1965 under the name Hôpital Charles-Richet and specialised in elder care. The hospital formed part of the Hôpitaux Universitaires Paris Nord Val de Seine group and offered 285 beds across acute care, rehabilitation, long-term care, and EHPAD services before its closure in 2019.

Originally named after the Nobel Prize-winning physiologist Charles Richet, the hospital was renamed in 2015 following public controversy over Richet's support for eugenics and racist theories. After an internal review, AP-HP concluded that Richet's published views were incompatible with the values of the public healthcare system. The hospital was subsequently renamed in honour of Dr Adélaïde Hautval, a French physician recognised for her resistance during the Nazi occupation and her defence of Jewish patients at Auschwitz.

The hospital ceased all clinical services in 2017, but the site continued operating as a transitional EHPAD until late 2021, when it was closed due to infrastructure deficiencies and the high cost of renovation. In 2023, a new 7,300 m² multiservice gerontological platform was inaugurated on the same grounds by the non-profit operator ARPAVIE. The facility includes a 110-bed EHPAD, day centres, caregiver support services, and home care programmes. In parallel, parts of the former hospital site were sold to Grand Paris Aménagement and are being redeveloped into an eco-district with 370 housing units, scheduled for completion in 2028.

== History ==
=== Establishment and early function ===
The hospital was inaugurated in 1965 under the name Hôpital Charles-Richet. It was constructed as a pavilion-style facility, consisting of 15 buildings spread across 8.3 hectares of wooded land on Rue du Haut-du-Roy in Villiers-le-Bel. The buildings covered a total surface area of 37,570 square metres, were designed to feel more personal and less institutional for geriatric care. Its services included acute care, rehabilitation, long-term care, palliative medicine, and support for dependent elderly residents (known as Établissement d'hébergement pour personnes âgées dépendantes EHPAD).

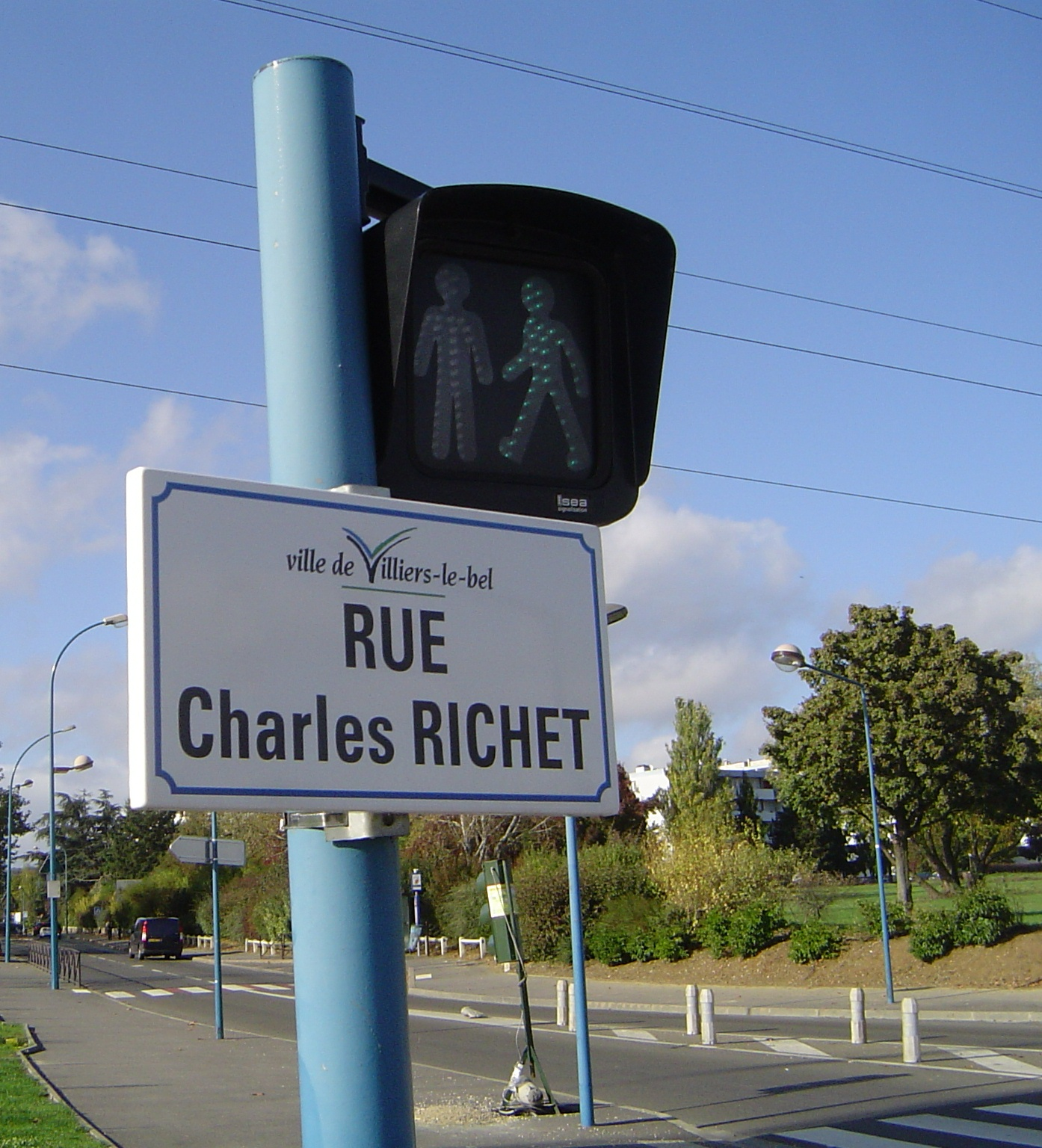
Former street sign for Rue Charles Richet in Villiers-le-Bel, removed following the hospital's renaming due to Richet's association with eugenicist views.

=== Naming controversy and renaming ===
In the early 2010s, public concern grew over the hospital's namesake, Charles Richet, a Nobel Prize-winning physiologist whose later works expressed support for eugenics and racist theories, notably in La Sélection humaine and L'Homme stupide. While his scientific contributions had once justified naming a hospital in his honour, a 2014 petition brought renewed attention to his published views.

In response, the AP-HP, the public hospital trust that operates hospitals across the Paris region, initiated an internal review of Richet's writings to assess whether these concerns were based on outdated readings of his work. In a public statement, the organisation concluded that the tone and content of the texts were incompatible with the values of the public healthcare system. Although Richet's scientific work had long been valued, the AP-HP noted the "intolerable" nature of his eugenic ideas and acknowledged that his writings may have contributed to harmful ideologies in the interwar period. The agency also cited the symbolic importance of aligning public institutions with ethical standards, particularly in light of France's republican and humanist values.

Following the review, AP-HP Director General Martin Hirsch and the mayor of Villiers-le-Bel, Jean-Louis Marsac, jointly agreed to remove Richet's name. In early 2015, the hospital was renamed in honour of Adélaïde Hautval (1906–1988), a French physician known for her moral resistance under Nazi occupation. Imprisoned at Auschwitz for defending Jewish patients, Hautval was later recognised as Righteous Among the Nations by Yad Vashem.

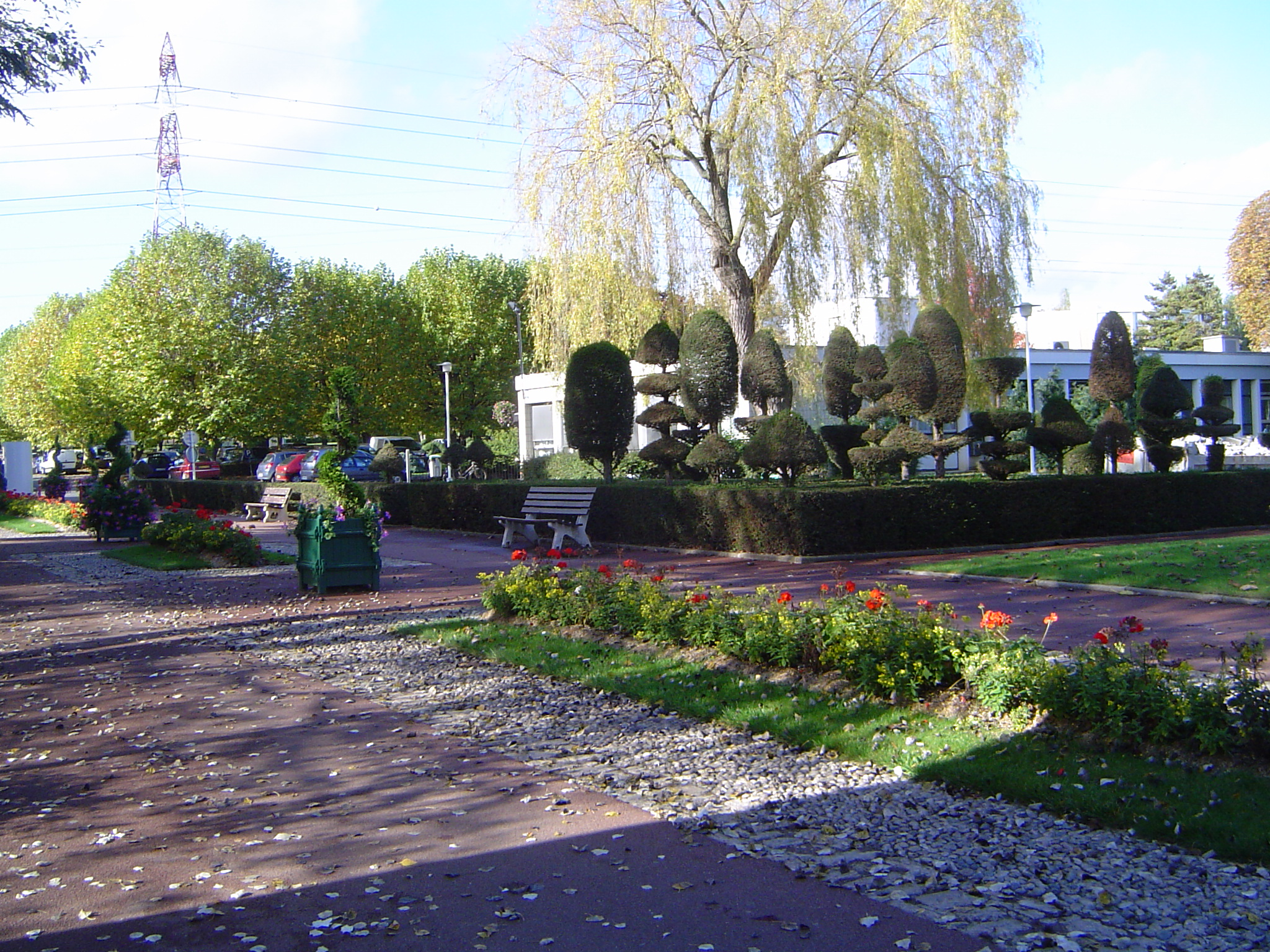
Main entrance of the hospital in 2009.

=== Closure and redevelopment ===
In May 2015, Hirsch announced a long-term transformation plan for the Adélaïde-Hautval Hospital, citing severe infrastructure deficiencies and the prohibitive €105 million cost of renovations. The plan included the progressive closure of the hospital, with all services to be transferred to nearby modern facilities, both within the AP-HP network and at regional partner hospitals. These included Beaujon, Bichat Claude-Bernard, Bretonneau, and Louis-Mourier (within the Hôpitaux Universitaires Paris Nord Val de Seine group), as well as public hospitals in Gonesse, Aulnay-sous-Bois, and Eaubonne-Montmorency.

The transition began in 2016, with 285 beds progressively reassigned and medical services redeployed in coordination with the regional health agency (Agence régionale de santé ARS) for Île-de-France. By March 2017, the full redeployment was completed, and the site no longer served as a hospital. Parts of the former hospital buildings were then used as temporary shelter for migrants. The premises continued to house an EHPAD with 184 residents, which remained in operation as part of a transitional arrangement. Originally intended to close in 2017, the closure was postponed multiple times first to 2019, then to 2021. That facility was eventually closed on 15 October 2021 to allow for the construction of a new geriatric care platform on the same site.

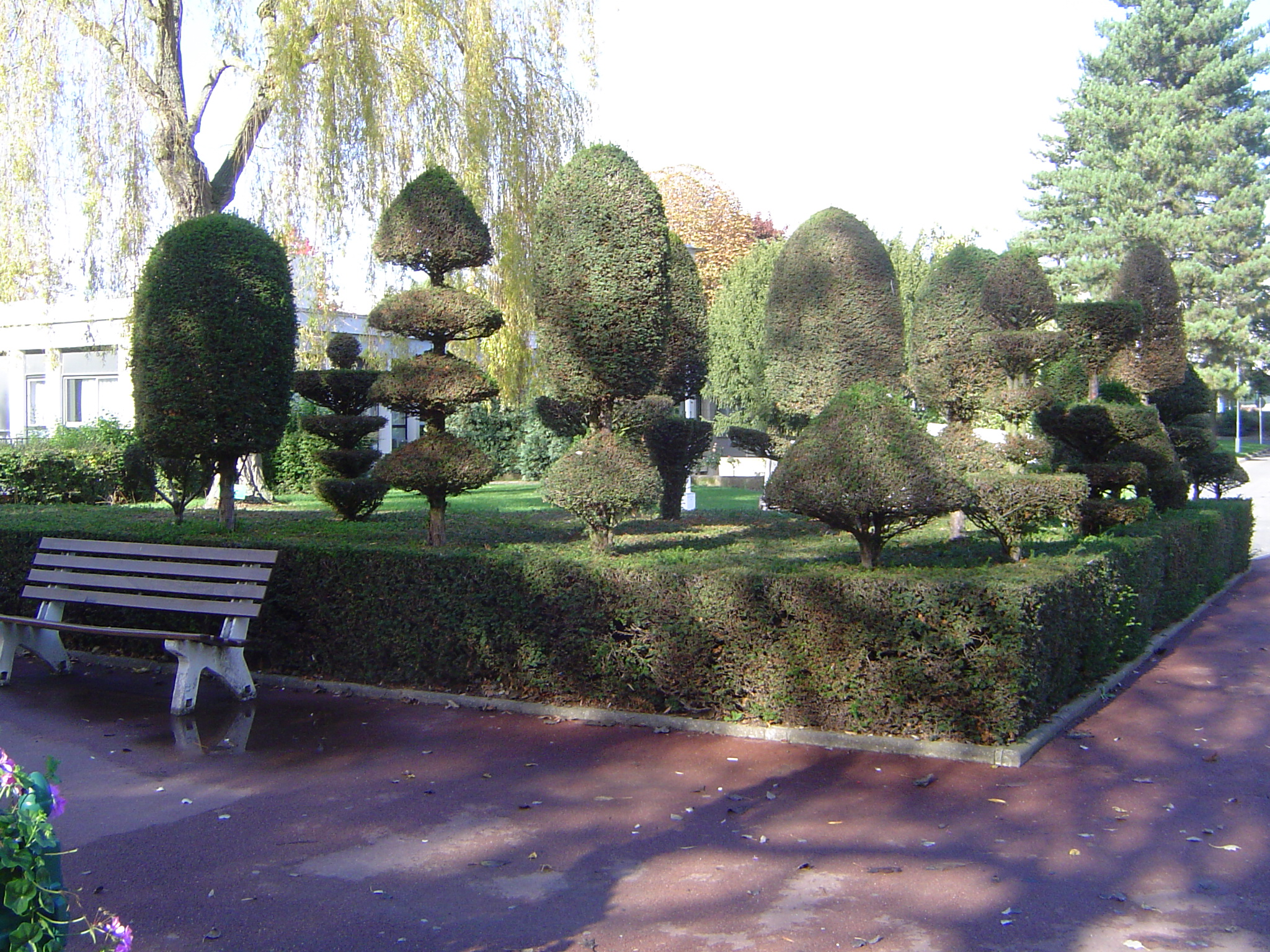
View of the hospital grounds and shrubbery.

=== Successor facilities and multiservice platform ===
In 2023, the non‑profit group ARPAVIE inaugurated a significantly expanded multiservice gerontological platform on the former hospital site, now officially listed at 1–3 rue Hélène Bertaux. The 7,300 m² facility was developed by Icade for CDC Habitat, co-funded by the Banque des territoires, the French Government, the Val-d'Oise departmental council, and the Agence régionale de santé Île-de-France. Operated by ARPAVIE, the platform includes a 110-bed EHPAD, two Pôles d'activités de soins adaptés (daytime care units for cognitive disorders), a 20-place day centre, a 20-place temporary accommodation unit, a Plateforme d'accompagnement des aidants (caregiver support centre), and home-based services via a combined nursing and assistance service (SPASAD) and a 50-place in-home nursing service (SSIAD). Several staff from the former hospital were rehired as part of an agreement with AP-HP, maintaining institutional continuity.

=== Redevelopment of original site ===
In parallel with the construction of the new geriatric platform, parts of the former 8.2-hectare hospital site were transferred to Grand Paris Aménagement, a public urban planning and development agency, which announced plans to redevelop the surrounding land into an eco-district with approximately 370 housing units, a community garden while preserving architectural elements. Partial demolition was scheduled to begin by 2024.

The new neighbourhood, scheduled for completion by 2028, will include a mix of residential units, local services, green space, and improved public transport. Of the 370 planned homes, only 18 percent will be reserved for social housing, with the majority aimed at owner-occupiers as part of a wider strategy to diversify the area's demographic profile. The site will also be served by a high-capacity bus line linking Villiers-le-Bel to Villepinte and Roissy, with a planned central station to host shops and amenities.

Although several outdated hospital structures are being demolished, others are slated for preservation and rehabilitation. The project places emphasis on low density and ecological integration, aiming to obtain eco-district certification. Feedback from residents during public consultation supported the overall plan, though concerns were raised regarding parking, traffic, and the nature of future commercial spaces. Environmental activists criticised the project as profit-driven arguing it prioritised real estate investment over community needs. Authorities nonetheless confirmed that the redevelopment would proceed.

== See also ==
- Résidence Plateforme Gérontologique Adélaïde Hautval
- Adélaïde Hautval
- Charles Richet
