= Down Town Association =

Social club in New York City

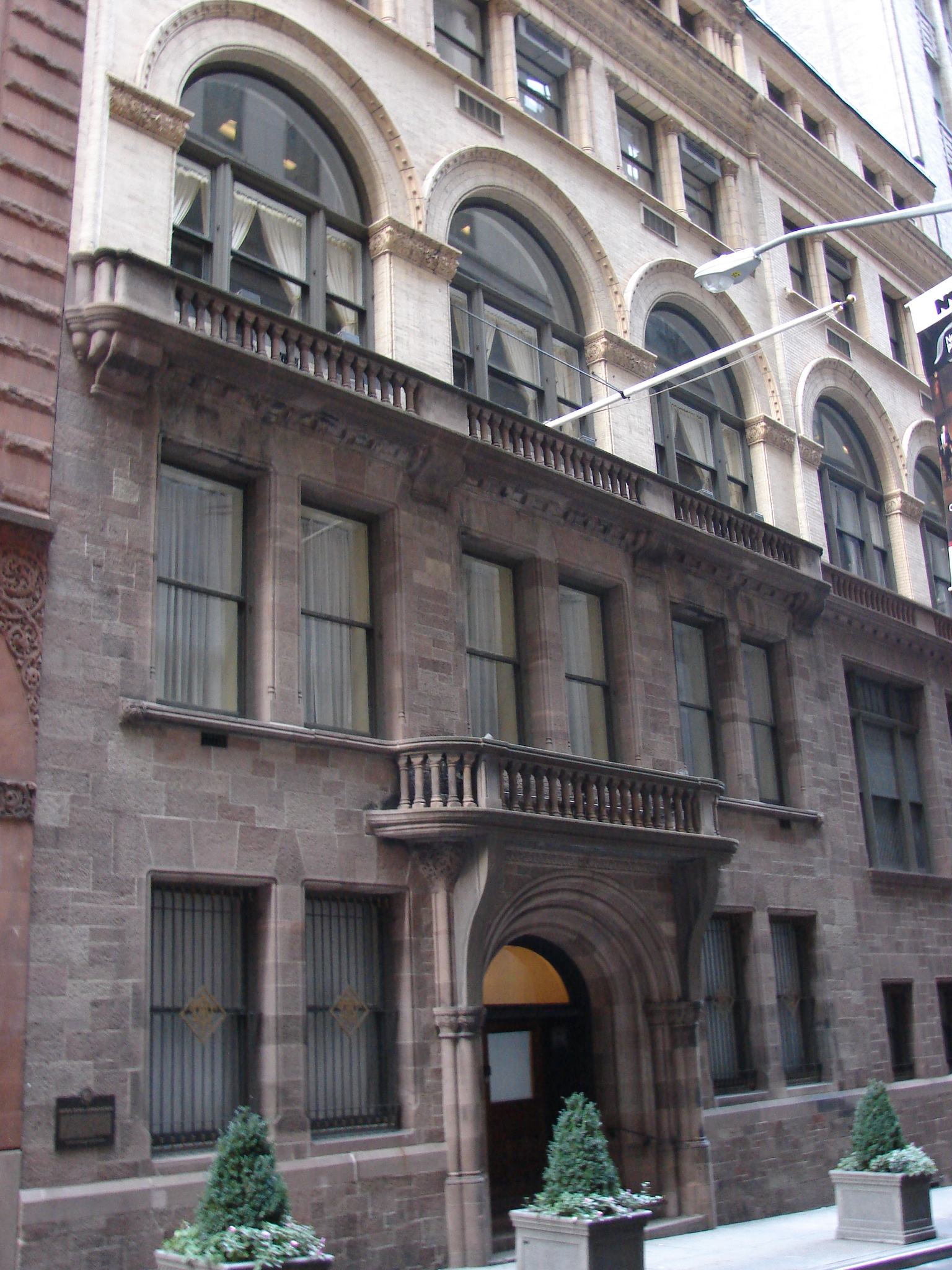
Down Town Association

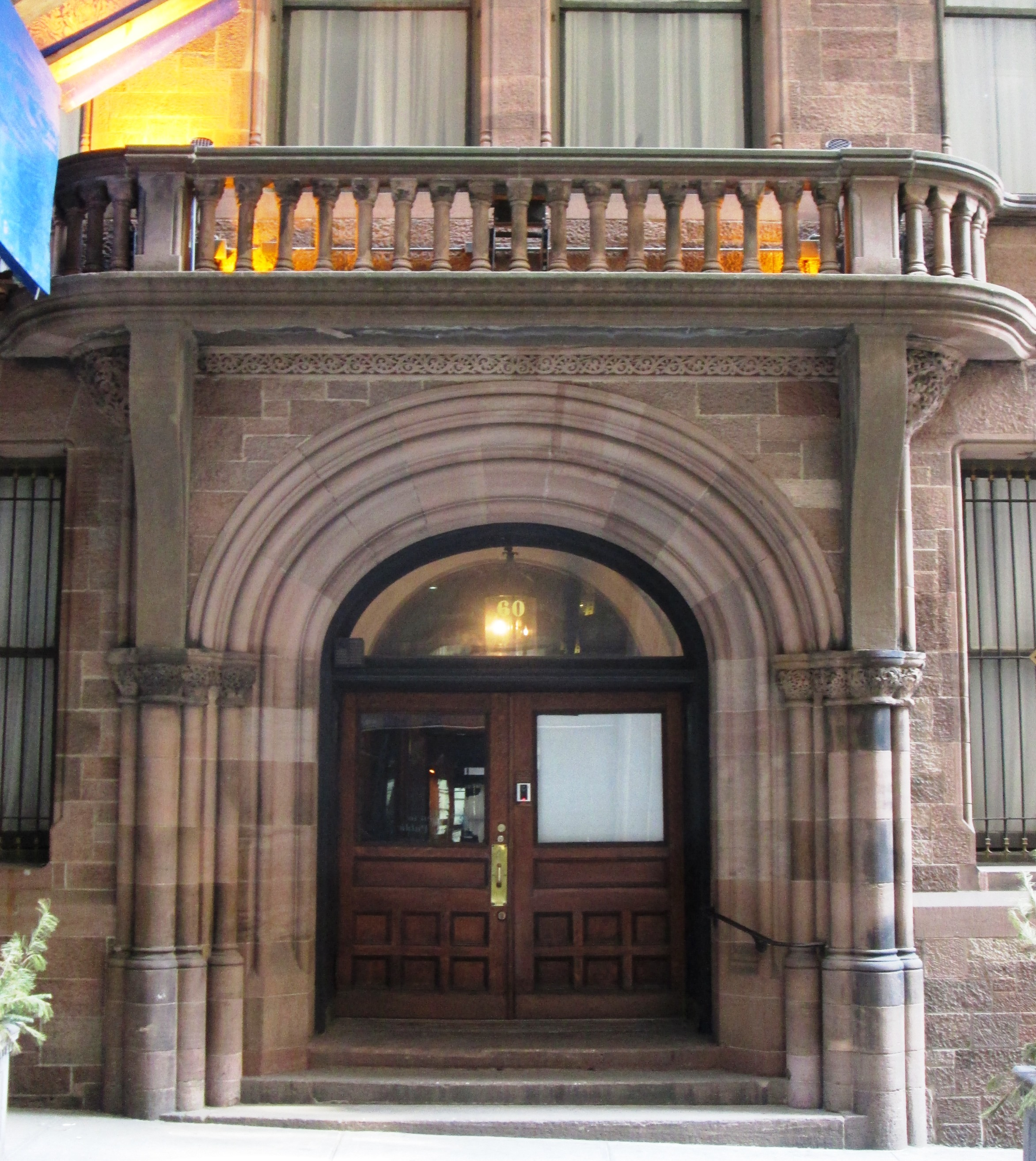
Entrance

The Down Town Association in the City of New York, usually referred to as the Down Town Association or the DTA, for short, is a private club in the Financial District of Manhattan, New York City. It has the following mission statement filed with the US Internal Revenue Service: “The association was created to furnish its members engaged in commercial and professional pursuits in the city of New York, facilities for social intercourse, and such accommodations as required during the intervals of business while at a distance from their residences, also the advancement of literature and art by establishing and maintaining a library, reading room, and gallery of art.”

Located at 60 Pine Street, between William and Pearl Streets, it is both the fifth oldest private club in New York and the first private club formed in lower Manhattan (1859). The Club has EIN 13-5035020 and the tax status "501(c)(7) Social and Recreation Clubs." In 2023 it claimed total revenue of $6,914,068 and total assets of $38,842,208.

Its third location and current club house (dedicated in 1887) holds the distinction of being the first purposely built private club house in New York City at a time when most clubs were still renting space inside former townhouses and mansions.

== History ==
The organizational meeting which resulted in the formation of the Association was held at the Astor House on December 23, 1859. The first general meeting of the Association was held on February 14, 1860, and a charter was granted by an act of the legislature of the State of New York on April 17, 1860.

The clubhouse opened on May 23, 1887. Land, building and furnishings cost $306,669.25. In 1902, a major renovation converted the original Victorian interiors to Edwardian and a partial sixth floor containing a laundry and other staff quarters was added to the original five story structure. In 1910, Charles Wetmore of the firm of Warren & Wetmore, a member of the Association, was engaged to plan an addition which was completed on March 16, 1911, at a cost of $175,556.76. The addition, in an exterior style sympathetic to the original, added several private dining rooms as well as the magnificent Jacobean-style paneled reading room on a new mezzanine level.

Until 1995, the DTA was solely a luncheon club. The DTA is now one of a few remaining private clubs in Lower Manhattan, with dinner and events on many evenings, a new gym on the top floor and full staffing throughout the day from early breakfast to evening drinks. Membership was originally restricted to men but women have been accepted as members since 1985.

== Clubhouse ==
The Romanesque Revival Clubhouse, a New York City landmark since 1997, was designed by Charles C. Haight, a member of the Association. The clubhouse is the oldest clubhouse in New York built for and still occupied by its members, and is the third such oldest in the United States, behind the Union League of Philadelphia and the Hope Club of Providence.

=== Interior ===
The clubhouse entry on Pine Street gives onto a marble accented lobby with a mosaic tiled floor and fireplace. A cast iron staircase rises four floors from the rear of the lobby. A large bar and lounging room, paneled in white oak, is reached a few steps down past the staircase. The first floor rear is a large main bar and gathering area for members.

The principal rooms above the first floor are the Reading Room, the Pine Street Room and larger Wainwright Room, now the Club's ballroom, on the second floor, the A la Carte Dining Room and the Buffet Room and Babcock Room, named for Samuel D. Babcock, the Club's third president, on the third floor and six private dining rooms and the Game Room on the fourth floor. The Game Room, now a members only room, was formerly a private dining room but now contains pocket billiards tables, games tables, a bar and a large collection of hunting trophies. A fitness facility on the fifth floor was built in the former employees locker room.

As originally conceived, and used until the early 1990s, the first floor was for pre-lunch preparation, either at the coat check, the men's or ladies washrooms, the barber or at the bar and oyster bar. The Reading Room was principally used after lunch and was where members could take coffee, port, a cigar, or a nap. All other rooms were for the service of lunch and each had a unique menu. Meals in these rooms were delivered from service pantries and through an extensive system of dumbwaiters from the kitchens which occupied fully half the fifth floor. As the demand for lunch service only transformed into today's full-service, full-day schedule, the kitchen was moved and several of the dining rooms were converted to other uses, principally meetings and banquets and also a gym.

== Notable members ==
The membership has included the leading businessmen of New York, including many who went on to careers in public service. The members are drawn heavily from the legal and financial professions.

The membership has included the political and business elite of New York, including Alexander Ector Orr, the "father of the New York City Subway", Franklin D. Roosevelt and Grover Cleveland, who both served as both New York governor and U.S. president; Thomas E. Dewey, the 47th governor of New York; Wendell Willkie,. the lawyer businessman who ran for President in 1940; William Donovan, first director of the Office of Strategic Services; and Gherardi Davis, the lawyer, author and politician who served as president and bequeathed the Club his large collection of silver cutlery and other items. Membership has also included four secretaries of state, including John Foster Dulles, five Attorneys General, one Secretary of Defense and two Secretaries of War. Two members have served as Ambassador to the Court of St. James and one member each as Ambassador to Switzerland, Luxembourg and Thailand.

== See also ==
- List of American gentlemen's clubs

== Sources ==
- Sixty Years of The Down Town Association of the City of New York 1860-1920. William Rhinelander Stewart. Printed for distribution to the members of the Association October 7, 1920.
- https://therealdeal.com/2018/09/24/benny-fong-buys-down-town-association-digs-in-sale-leaseback-deal/
