= Montauk Association Historic District =

Historic district in New York, United States

- U.S. National Register of Historic Places
- U.S. Historic district
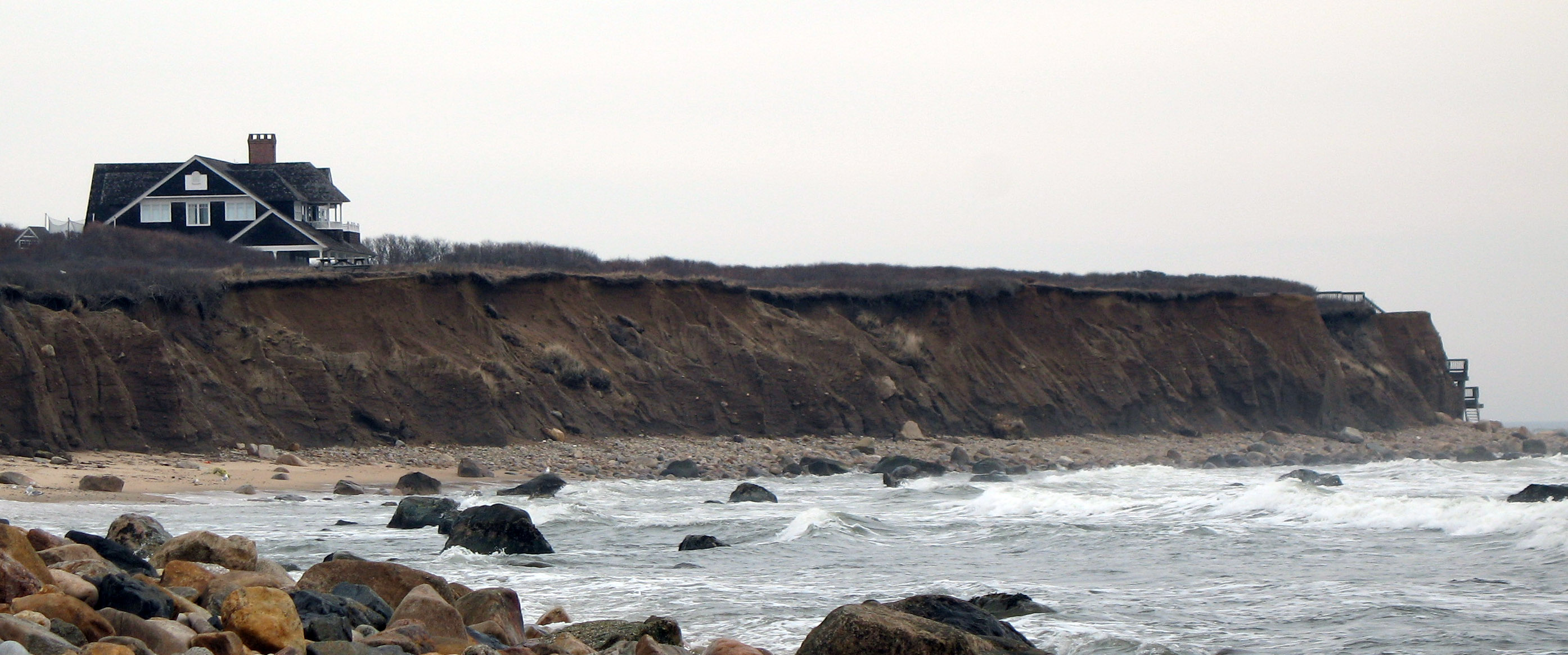
- A Montauk Association House in Ditch Plains

- Location within New York Location within the United States
- Nearest city: Montauk, New York
- Coordinates: 41°2′38″N 71°54′24″W
- Area: 100 acres (40 ha)
- Built: 1881
- Architect: Olmsted, Frederick Law; McKim, Mead & White
- Architectural style: Shingle Style
- NRHP reference No.: 76001282
- Added to NRHP: October 22, 1976

The Montauk Association Historic District is a 100-acre (40 ha) historic district that was listed on the National Register of Historic Places in 1976. It is a complex of large Shingle style cottages for wealthy New York City families' summer use, designed by McKim, Mead and White within a site plan designed by Frederick Law Olmsted in 1881. In 1976, the district included nine buildings deemed to be contributing to the historic character of the area, and two other contributing sites. It is bounded on the south by the Atlantic Ocean, on the west by the hamlet of Ditch Plains, and on the north and east by marsh and scrubland.

It includes seven large Shingle style homes that, together with a clubhouse and other supporting buildings, comprised the Montauk Association, and which were built during 1881–1884. The Montauk Association as an entity no longer exists. The district also includes the sites of two former buildings of the Montauk Association, a community laundry and a community stable, which remain as archeological sites. Another former building, the casino and clubhouse of the association, was burned in 1933 and has been replaced by a modern house, the Tweed House. Another modern house, the Wright House, stands separately to the northwest of the complex of cottages. There are also several small sheds and garages which are unobtrusive and do not unduly detract.

The seven cottages are:

- Agnew Cottage (1884)
- Benson House (1883)
- Sanger House (1883)
- Hoyt House (1883)
- Andrews House (1884)
- de Forest House (1882)
- Orr House (1883)

All seven were designed by McKim, Mead and White and are placed carefully in the natural landscape, conforming to a site plan designed by landscape designer Frederick Law Olmsted. They were placed into the natural landscape and linked by pathways, leaving the natural landscape mostly undisturbed.

== See also ==
- Tick Hall
