= QB VII =

1970 novel by Leon Uris

First edition (publ. Doubleday)

QB VII by Leon Uris is a dramatic courtroom novel published in 1970. The four-part novel highlights the events leading to a libel trial in the United Kingdom. The novel was Uris's second consecutive #1 New York Times Best Seller and third overall. The novel is loosely based on a court case for defamation (Dering v Uris) that arose from Uris's earlier best-selling novel Exodus.

== Title ==
"QB VII" is an abbreviation of Queen's Bench Courtroom Number Seven.

== Plot ==
A famous author, Abraham Cady, stands trial for libel. In his book The Holocaust, he named eminent surgeon Sir Adam Kelno as one of the Jadwiga concentration camp's most sadistic inmates/doctors. Cady wrote the book after discovering the Jadwiga concentration camp was the site of his family's extermination.

Kelno has denied his involvement in sadistic practices, and asserts he worked hard to save prisoners, at great personal risk. Furious at his depiction by Cady, Kelno brings libel charges against him.

In the end, Kelno wins his case but is awarded one half-penny, the smallest coin of the realm, because his past actions were found to have been so bad that the minor inaccuracies in the book could not have damaged his reputation further.

The book was loosely based on a libel case involving the author and brought by Polish doctor Wladislaw Dering. Dering alleged that Uris had defamed him in his book Exodus.

== Reception ==
A review in TIME magazine called QB VII a "vulgar affront" and a "rather gratuitous endurance test".

== Television miniseries ==
The book was adapted into an Emmy-winning American television miniseries QB VII which aired on ABC on April 29 and 30, 1974.
