= Martha Rogers (professor) =

American author (born 1955)

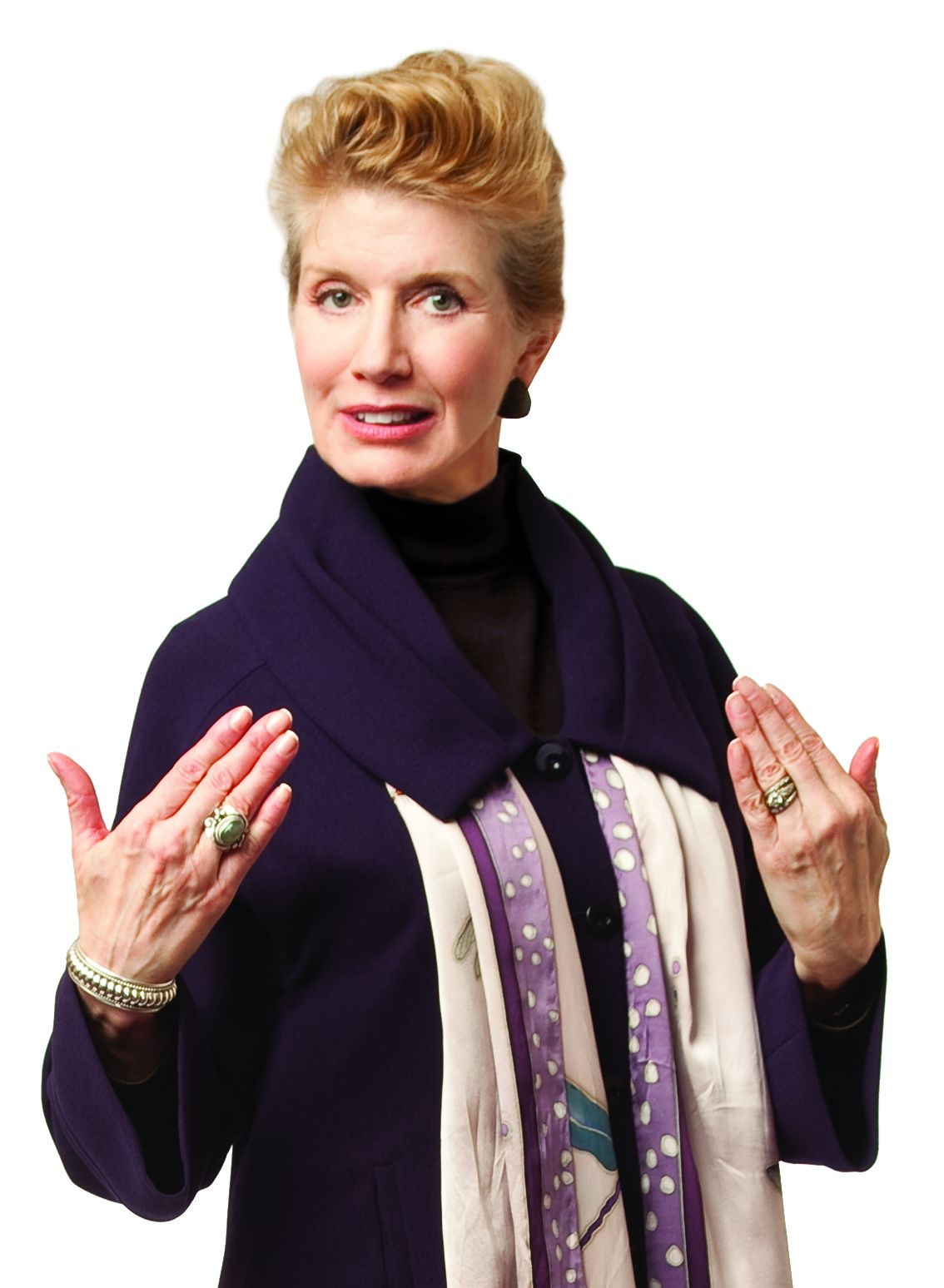
- Born: March 10, 1955 (age 71)
- Occupations: Author, speaker, founding partner of Peppers & Rogers Group
- Spouse: Dick Cavett (m. 2010)
- Website: 1to1media.com/speaking/

Martha Rogers (born March 10, 1955) is an American author, customer strategist, and founding partner of Peppers & Rogers Group, a management consulting firm. Rogers is an adjunct professor at the Fuqua School of Business at Duke University and a co-director of the Duke Center for Customer Relationship Management (CRM).

== Biography ==
Rogers graduated from Birmingham-Southern College in 1974 and earned her PhD at the University of Tennessee as a Bickel fellow.

Rogers has been published in academic and trade journals, including the Harvard Business Review, Journal of Advertising Research, and the Journal of Public Policy and Marketing.

Rogers has co-authored nine customer strategy books with Don Peppers. Peppers and Rogers are often credited with having launched the CRM revolution with their first book, The One to One Future: Building Relationships One Customer at a Time (1993). Inc. Magazine managing editor George Gendron called this book "one of the two or three most important business books ever written", while Business Week called it the "bible of the new marketing". In 2011, the authors released a second, updated edition of their textbook, Managing Customer Relationships: A Strategic Perspective.

In 2010, Rogers married television personality and talk show host Dick Cavett in New Orleans, Louisiana.

== Bibliography ==
- Extreme Trust: Honesty as a Competitive Advantage, (2012) ISBN 978-1-59184-467-9
- Managing Customer Relationships: A Strategic Framework (2nd ed., 2011) ISBN 978-0-470-42347-9
- Rules to Break and Laws to Follow (2008) ISBN 978-0-470-22754-1
- Return on Customer (2005) ISBN 978-0385510301
- One to One B2B (2001) ISBN 978-0-385-49409-0
- The One to One Fieldbook (1999) ISBN 0-385-49369-X
- The One to One Manager (1999) ISBN 0-385-49408-4
- Enterprise One to One (1997) ISBN 0-385-48755-X
- The One to One Future (1993) ISBN 0-7499-1492-0
