= Dick Cavett =

American television personality, comedian and former talk show host (born 1936)

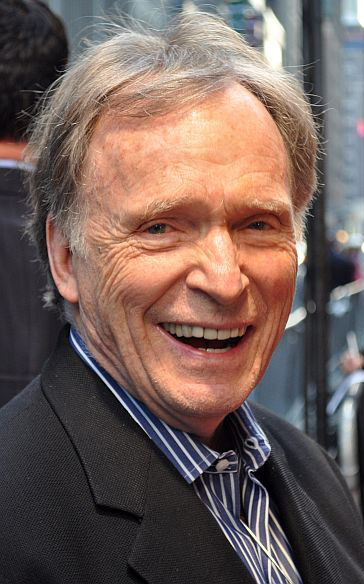
- Cavett in 2010
- Born: Richard Alva Cavett; November 19, 1936 (age 90); Buffalo County, Nebraska, U.S.
- Education: Yale University (BA)
- Occupations: Television personality; comedian
- Years active: 1956–present
- Spouses: Carrie Nye (m. 1964; died 2006) Martha Rogers (m. 2010)

Richard Alva Cavett (/ˈkævɪt/ KAV-it; born November 19, 1936) is an American television personality, comedian and former talk show host. He appeared regularly on nationally broadcast television in the United States from the 1960s through the 2000s.

In later years, Cavett has written an online column for The New York Times, promoted DVDs of his former shows, as well as a book of his Times columns, and hosted replays of his TV interviews with various celebrities on Turner Classic Movies.

== Early life and education ==
Cavett was born on November 19, 1936, in Buffalo County, Nebraska, but sources differ as to the specific town, locating his birthplace in either Gibbon, where his family lived, or nearby Kearney, the location of the nearest hospital. Cavett has said that his birth certificate gives Kearney as his birthplace, but has given conflicting answers on whether he was actually born there.

His mother, Erabel "Era" (née Richards), and his father, Alva B. Cavett, both worked as teachers. Cavett's grandparents all lived in Grand Island, Nebraska. His paternal grandparents were Alva A. Cavett and Gertrude Pinsch. His paternal grandfather was from Diller, Nebraska, and his paternal grandmother was an immigrant from Aachen, Germany, which is why he also speaks fluent German. His maternal grandparents were the Rev. R. R. and Etta Mae Richards. The Rev. Mr. Richards was from Carmarthen, Wales, and was a Baptist minister who served parishes across central Nebraska. Cavett himself is a self-described agnostic.

Cavett's parents taught in Comstock, Gibbon, and Grand Island, where Cavett started kindergarten at Wasmer Elementary School. Three years later, both of his parents landed teaching positions in Lincoln, Nebraska, where Cavett completed his education at Capitol, Prescott, and Irving schools and Lincoln High School. When Cavett was ten, his mother died of cancer at age 36. His father subsequently married Dorcas Deland, also a teacher, originally from Alliance, Nebraska. On September 24, 1995, Lincoln Public Schools dedicated the new Dorcas C. and Alva B. Cavett Elementary School in their honor.

In eighth grade, Cavett directed a live Saturday-morning radio show sponsored by the Junior League and played the title role in The Winslow Boy. One of his high-school classmates was actress Sandy Dennis. Cavett was elected president of the student council in high school, and was a gold medalist at the state gymnastics championship.

Before leaving for college, he worked as a caddie at the Lincoln Country Club. He also began performing magic shows for $35 a night under the tutelage of Gene Gloye. In 1952, Cavett attended the convention of the International Brotherhood of Magicians in St. Louis, Missouri, and won the Best New Performer trophy. Around the same time, he met fellow magician Johnny Carson, 11 years his senior, who was doing a magic act at a church in Lincoln.

While attending Yale University, Cavett played in and directed dramas on the campus radio station, WYBC, and appeared in Yale drama productions. In his senior year, he changed his major from English to drama, graduating in 1958. He also took advantage of any opportunity to meet stars, routinely going to shows in New York to hang around stage doors or venture backstage. He would go so far as to carry a copy of Variety or an appropriate piece of company stationery in order to look inconspicuous while sneaking backstage or into a TV studio. Cavett took many odd jobs ranging from store detective to label typist for a Wall Street firm, and as a copyboy at Time magazine.

== Career ==
=== Oregon Shakespearean Festival Association ===
In 1956, Cavett joined the Oregon Shakespeare Festival, which is based in Ashland, Oregon, for its 16th season. Cavett appeared as the Bishop of Ely and the second murderer in Tragedy of Richard the Third; a page to the king in Love's Labour's Lost; servant Gregory in The Tragedy of Romeo & Juliet; a lord in The Tragedy of Cymbeline; and Quintus, son of Titus, in The Lamentable Tragedy of Titus Andronicus.

=== The Tonight Show ===
Cavett was cast in a film by the Signal Corps, but further jobs were not forthcoming. He was an extra on The Phil Silvers Show in 1959, a TV remake of the film Body and Soul for the DuPont Show of the Month the same year, and Playhouse 90 ("The Hiding Place") in 1960. He briefly revived his magic act while working as a typist and as a mystery shopper in department stores.

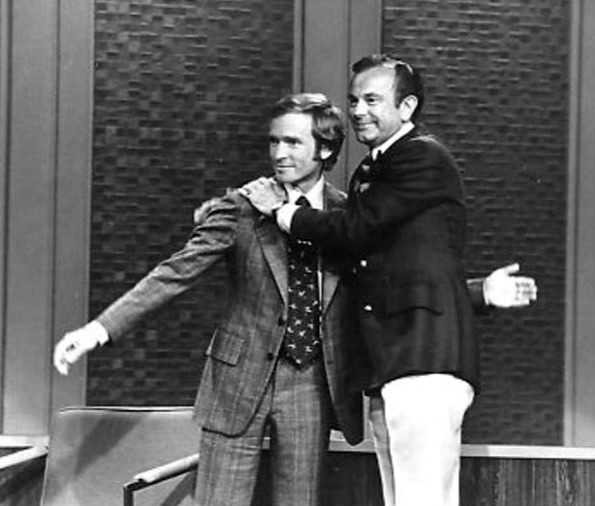
Dick Cavett and Jack Paar

Cavett was a copyboy at Time magazine when he read a newspaper item about Jack Paar, then host of The Tonight Show. The article described Paar's concerns about his opening monologue and constant search for material. Cavett wrote some jokes, put them into a Time envelope, and went to the RCA Building. He ran into Paar in a hallway and handed him the envelope. He then went to sit in the studio audience. During the show, Paar worked in some of the lines that Cavett had fed him.

Afterward, Cavett got into an elevator with Paar, who invited him to contribute more jokes. Within weeks, Cavett was hired, originally as talent coordinator. Cavett wrote for Paar the famous line "Here they are, Jayne Mansfield" as an introduction for the buxom actress.

Cavett appeared on the show in 1961, acting as interpreter for Miss Universe of 1961, Marlene Schmidt of Germany.

While at Time, Cavett wrote a letter to film comedian Arthur Jefferson, better known as Stan Laurel of the comedy team Laurel and Hardy. The two soon met at Laurel's Hollywood apartment. On the evening of that first visit, Cavett wrote a tribute to him that Paar read on his show. Laurel saw the broadcast which he deeply appreciated. Cavett visited the legendary comedian several times. Their final time together came three weeks prior to Laurel's death in 1965.

In his capacity as talent coordinator for The Tonight Show, Cavett was sent to the Blue Angel nightclub to see Woody Allen's act, and immediately afterward struck up a friendship. The very next day, the funeral of playwright George S. Kaufman was held at the Frank E. Campbell funeral home. Allen could not attend, but Cavett did, where he met Groucho Marx in an anteroom. From the funeral, Cavett followed Marx (who later told Cavett that Kaufman was "his personal god") three blocks up Fifth Avenue to the Plaza Hotel, where Marx invited him to lunch.

Years later, Cavett gave the introduction to Marx's one-man show An Evening with Groucho Marx at Carnegie Hall and began by saying, "I can't believe that I know Groucho Marx."

Cavett continued with The Tonight Show as a writer after Johnny Carson assumed hosting duties. For Carson he wrote the quip "Having your taste criticized by Dorothy Kilgallen is like having your clothes criticized by Emmett Kelly." Cavett appeared on the show once, to do a gymnastics routine on the pommel horse. After departing The Tonight Show, Cavett wrote for Jerry Lewis's ill-fated talk show.

=== Stand-up comic ===
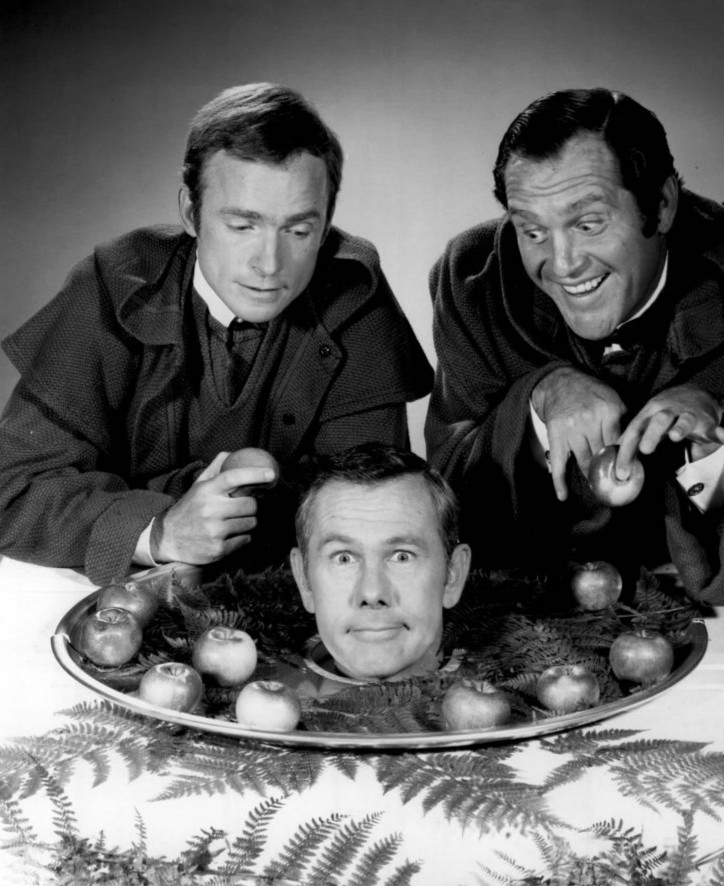
Cavett, Alan King and Johnny Carson in 1968

Cavett began a brief career as a stand-up comic in 1964 at The Bitter End in Greenwich Village. His manager was Jack Rollins. One of his jokes from this period was:

I went to a Chinese-German restaurant. The food is great, but an hour later you're hungry for power.

Cavett also played Mr. Kelly's in Chicago and Enrico Banducci's hungry i in San Francisco. In San Francisco, he met Lenny Bruce, about whom he said, "I liked him and wish I had known him better ... but most of what has been written about him is a waste of good ink, and his most zealous adherents and hardest-core devotees are to be avoided, even if it means working your way around the world in the hold of a goat transport."

In 1965, Cavett did some commercial voiceovers, including a series of mock interviews with Mel Brooks for Ballantine beer. In the next couple of years he appeared on game shows, including What's My Line. He wrote for Merv Griffin and appeared on Griffin's talk show several times, and then on The Ed Sullivan Show. In the late 1960s or early 1970s, he narrated a National Association of Broadcasters PSA featuring A Boy Wandering Around a Forest.

After doing The Star and the Story, a rejected television pilot with Van Johnson, Cavett hosted a special, Where It's At, for Bud Yorkin and Norman Lear.

In 1968, Cavett was hired by ABC to host This Morning. According to a New Yorker article, the show was too sophisticated for a morning audience, and ABC first moved the show to prime time, and subsequently to a late-night slot opposite Johnny Carson's The Tonight Show.

=== The Dick Cavett Show ===
External videos
- Dick Cavett on Fame, George Harrison and The Worst Interview He Ever Did, 14:08, The Greene Space at WNYC & WQXR
- Lester Maddox and Jim Brown Get Into Heated Debate on Segregation, 13:14, The Dick Cavett Show, December 18, 1970

Intermittently since 1968, Cavett has been host of his own talk show, in various formats and on various television and radio networks. Cavett has been nominated for at least 10 Emmy Awards and has won three. In 1970, he co-hosted the Emmy Awards Show (from Carnegie Hall in New York) with Bill Cosby (from Century Plaza in Los Angeles). His most popular talk show was his ABC program, which ran from 1969 to 1974. From 1962 to 1992, The Tonight Show Starring Johnny Carson was arguably the most popular late-night variety and talk show. Unlike many contemporary shows that attempted to compete with Carson in the same timeslot but were quickly cancelled, Cavett managed to remain on the air for five years despite ABC being a smaller network with fewer affiliates than NBC at the time.

Cavett earned a reputation as "the thinking man's talk show host" and received favorable reviews from critics. As a talk show host, Cavett has been noted for his ability to listen to his guests and engage them in intellectual conversation. Clive James described Cavett "as a true sophisticate with a daunting intellectual range" and "the most distinguished talk-show host in America." He is also known for his ability to remain calm and mediate between contentious guests as well as his resonant voice.

Cavett's show often focused on controversial people or subjects, often pairing guests with opposing views on social or political issues, such as Jim Brown and Lester Maddox.

On February 11, 1970, Cavett hosted a tribute to the life and works of Sir Noël Coward, who had just been knighted in December 1969. Coward appeared as a guest, along with Alfred Lunt, Lynn Fontanne, Tammy Grimes, and Brian Bedford, each of whom were enjoying a successful run on Broadway in the revival of Coward's play, Private Lives. In reviewing the show for The New York Times, television critic Jack Gould said, "The age of youth? Balder dash! The over‐70 set walked off yesterday morning with a television program that combined the engaging qualities of lightly recalled nostalgia, the sophisticated stiletto, and a demonstration of genuine affection that had more substance than adolescent wails on how love will save the world. Sir Noël Coward, Alfred Lunt and Lynn Fontanne, friends of a lifetime, met on Dick Cavett's show on the American Broadcasting Company network. They exchanged quips, pleasantries and thoughts about the theater with the beguiling charm of talented luminaries. Mr. Cavett was clearly overawed, and for once, the ad libs frequently went over his head. It was an enchanting show ... and the badinage was warm and delightful ... a fun night, and to take out of context a line or here or there could not convey the whole. To go to bed with a chuckle provided by gifted and nice people, onstage as off, is review enough."

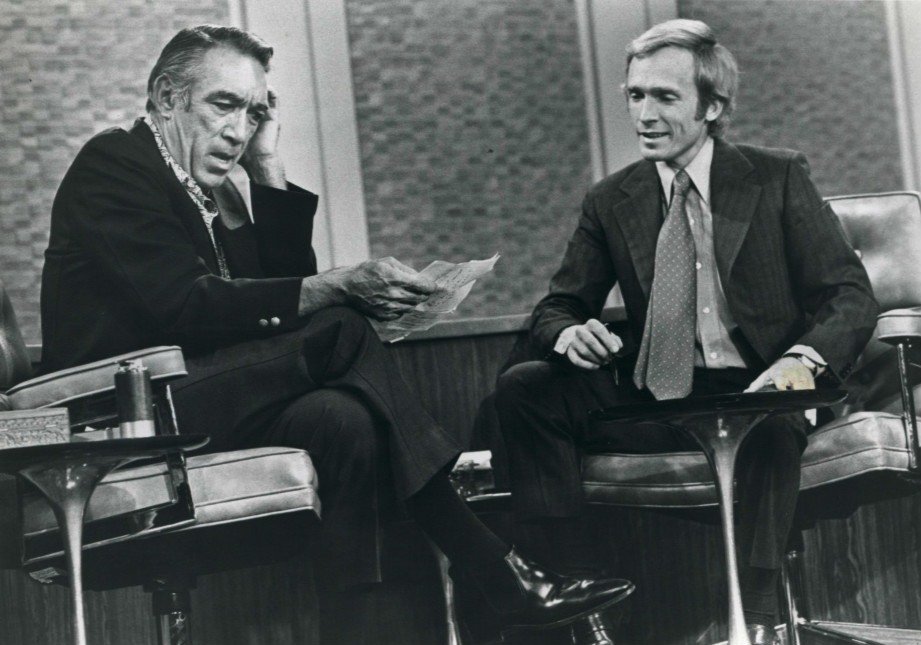
With Anthony Quinn in 1971

One show from June 1971 featured a debate between future senator and presidential candidate John Kerry and fellow veteran John O'Neill over the Vietnam War. O'Neill had been approached by the Nixon administration to work through the Vietnam Veterans for a Just Peace to counter Kerry's influence on the public. The debate went poorly for the pro-war side, so angering President Nixon that he is heard discussing the incident on the Watergate tapes, saying, "Well, is there any way we can screw him [Cavett]? That's what I mean. There must be ways." H.R. Haldeman, White House Chief of Staff, answered, "We've been trying to." Cavett's name comes up a total of 26 times on the tapes, as he repeatedly highlighted the wrongdoings of the Nixon administration on his show.

Cavett hosted many pop stars, both in interview and performance, such as David Bowie, Sly Stone, Jimi Hendrix and Janis Joplin. Several of his Emmy Award nominations and one Emmy Award were for Outstanding Musical or Variety Series, and in 2005 Shout Factory released a selection of performances and interviews on a three-DVD set, The Dick Cavett Show: Rock Icons, showcasing interviews of and performances by rock musicians who appeared on the Dick Cavett show from 1969 to 1974.

Clips from his TV shows (actual or enacted for the occasion) have been used in films, for example Annie Hall (1977), Forrest Gump (1994), Apollo 13 (1995), Frequency (2000) and Apollo 10½: A Space Age Childhood (2022) Cavett was surprised at footage from his TV show appearing in Apollo 13. He said at the time of the film's release, "I'm happily enjoying a movie, and suddenly I'm in it."

=== 1970s ===
Cavett has appeared as himself in various other television shows, such as The Odd Couple as well as serving as a host for Saturday Night Live in 1976. He also had a cameo role in Woody Allen's Annie Hall (1977) and he played himself in the movie Power Play (1977).

Cavett was present when actor Marlon Brando broke the jaw of paparazzo photographer Ron Galella on June 12, 1973. Galella had followed Cavett and Brando to a restaurant after the taping of The Dick Cavett Show in New York City.

=== 1980s ===
Cavett appeared in Kate & Allie (1986), Cheers (1983), and in Robert Altman's Health (1980). In a cameo in A Nightmare on Elm Street 3: Dream Warriors (1987), as part of a dream sequence, he turned into Freddy Krueger and slashed his guest, Zsa Zsa Gabor, halfway through the interview. In Tim Burton's Beetlejuice (1988), he played a rare cameo as a character (Delia's agent) other than himself. Cavett often appeared on television quiz and game shows, including What's My Line?, To Tell the Truth, Password, and the $25,000 Pyramid.

Cavett narrated the HBO documentary series Time Was. Each episode covered a decade, ranging from the 1920s to the 1970s. The show originally aired in November 1979 and ran for six months. Cavett hosted a documentary series for HBO in the early 1980s titled Remember When . . . that examined changes in American culture over time and he hosted HBO's monthly review series HBO Magazine.

In April 1981, Cavett traveled to Stockholm, Sweden, to interview pop group ABBA on the occasion of their tenth anniversary as a group. The special, titled Dick Cavett Meets ABBA, was taped by the Swedish TV network SVT and was broadcast mainly in Europe.

In 1988, Cavett made a special appearance on Wheel of Fortune during their week of shows at Radio City Music Hall, walking on stage after someone solved the puzzle "Dick Cavett". In 1974, Cavett's company, Daphne Productions, co-produced with Don Lipp Productions a short-lived ABC game show, The Money Maze, although Cavett's name did not appear on the credits. He also had a brief stint as the Narrator in Stephen Sondheim's Into the Woods.

=== 1990s ===
In 1995, Cavett lent his voice for The Simpsons episode "Homie the Clown". He also appeared in footage from The Dick Cavett Show in Robert Zemeckis' Forrest Gump (1994), and Ron Howard's Apollo 13 (1995).

=== 2000s ===
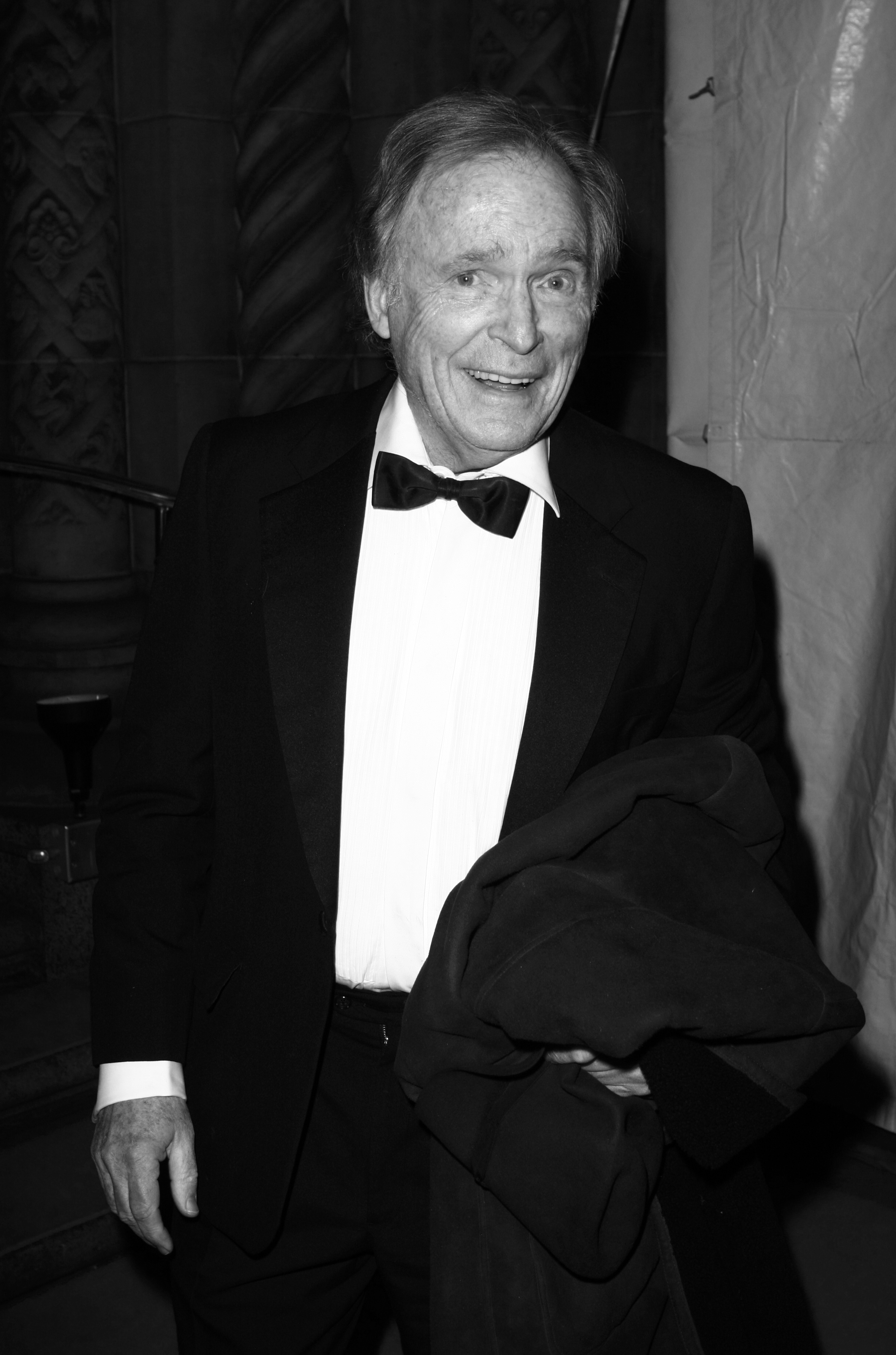
Cavett in 2008

From November 2000 to January 2002, he played the narrator in a Broadway revival of The Rocky Horror Show.

Cavett is featured in the 2003 documentary From the Ashes: The Life and Times of Tick Hall about the fire that destroyed his home in Montauk, New York and his effort to rebuild it.

Cavett's signature tune has long been a trumpet version of the vocalise "Glitter and Be Gay" from Leonard Bernstein's Candide. The tune was first played at the midpoint of his ABC show, and later became the theme of his PBS show. The tune is also played as he walks on stage during guest appearances on other talk shows.

In 2008, Cavett entered an Iraq war dispute with a New York Times blog entry criticizing General David Petraeus, stating "I can't look at Petraeus—his uniform ornamented like a Christmas tree with honors, medals, and ribbons—without thinking of the great Mort Sahl at the peak of his brilliance." Cavett went on to recall Sahl's expressed contempt for General William Westmoreland's display of medals, and criticized Petraeus for not speaking in plain language.

=== 2010s ===
In 2011, Cavett appeared as a talking head in the Robert Weide two-part documentary series Woody Allen: A Documentary for American Masters which aired on PBS.

In December 2012, for their annual birthday celebration to "The Master", The Noël Coward Society invited Cavett as the guest celebrity to lay flowers in front of Coward's statue at New York's Gershwin Theatre, commemorating the 113th birthday of Sir Noël. Coward had made an appearance on Cavett's ABC late-night television show in 1970 after being knighted by Queen Elizabeth II in December 1969.

Cavett starred in Hellman v. McCarthy (Literary Legends Declare War!) in New York City's Abingdon Theatre. Cavett re-enacted his show of January 25, 1980, when literary critic Mary McCarthy appeared as a guest, and declared every word playwright Lillian Hellman wrote was "a lie, including 'and' and 'the'." Hellman later sued McCarthy for libel. The suit spanned more than four years. Cavett's off-Broadway play opened March 14, 2014, and closed April 13, 2014, in its limited run. He subsequently came to Los Angeles to appear in a production at Theatre 40, and delighted audiences by remaining onstage after the performance and doing a 10-minute monologue.

=== 2020s ===
In January 2020, Cavett appeared on The Late Show with Stephen Colbert promoting the new HBO special, Ali and Cavett: The Tales of the Tapes. There he talked about his career as a comedian and talk show host, as well as his relationship with Muhammad Ali.

=== Writing ===
Cavett has co-authored two books with Christopher Porterfield: Cavett (1974), his autobiography, and Eye on Cavett (1983). Cavett has also written a blog, published by The New York Times, entitled "Talk Show: Dick Cavett Speaks Again".

== Influence and impact ==
In January 2020, when Cavett appeared as a guest on Late Show with Stephen Colbert, Colbert stated that he was a huge admirer of Cavett, and had seen all of his talk shows. Colbert also stated, "People ask me who my influences are, and of course Johnny Carson, and of course David Letterman, but the one people don't automatically know is what a huge influence you were on me, the way you interviewed people was so honest, you had such interesting and unusual guests and asked such interesting and deep questions".

== Personal life ==
=== Family ===
While taking a class at Yale School of Drama as an undergraduate, Cavett met his future wife, Caroline Nye McGeoy (known professionally as Carrie Nye), a native of Greenwood, Mississippi. After graduation, the two acted in summer theater at the Williamstown Theatre Festival in Williamstown, Massachusetts; and Cavett worked for two weeks in a local lumberyard to be able to buy an engagement ring. On June 4, 1964, they were married in New York. They remained married until Nye's death in 2006. In 2010, Cavett married author Martha Rogers in New Orleans, Louisiana. From this marriage, Cavett has two stepchildren. Rogers and Cavett reside in Ridgefield, Connecticut. They were formerly residents of Montauk, Long Island, and sold their estate there in 2021 for $23.6 million.

=== Depression ===
Cavett has openly discussed his bouts of clinical depression, an illness that first affected him during his freshman year at Yale. According to an interview published in a 1992 issue of People magazine, Cavett contacted Nathan Kline in 1975 seeking treatment. Kline prescribed antidepressant medication, which according to Cavett was successful in treating his depression.

In 1980, Cavett experienced what he characterized as his "biggest depressive episode". While on board a Concorde before takeoff, Cavett broke out into a sweat and became agitated. After he was removed from the plane, Cavett was taken to Columbia Presbyterian Hospital in New York City, where he later underwent electroconvulsive therapy. Regarding this method of treatment, Cavett is quoted as saying, "In my case, ECT was miraculous. My wife was dubious, but when she came into my room afterward, I sat up and said, 'Look who's back among the living.' It was like a magic wand."

Cavett was also the subject of a 1993 video produced by the Depression and Related Affective Disorders Association called A Patient's Perspective.

In 1997, Cavett was sued by producer James Moskovitz for breach of contract after failing to show up for a nationally syndicated radio program (also called The Dick Cavett Show). Cavett's lawyer, Melvyn Leventhal, said at the time that Cavett left because of a manic-depressive episode. The case was later dropped.

== Works ==
=== Film ===
Year	Title	Role	Notes
1972	VD Blues	Himself/host	
1977	Annie Hall	Himself	
1978	Power Play	Himself	
1980	Simon	Himself	
1980	Health	Himself	
1981	Rich and Famous	Himself	Uncredited
1983	Parade of Stars	Fred Allen	
1987	A Nightmare on Elm Street 3: Dream Warriors	Himself	
1988	After School	Himself	
1988	Moon over Parador	Himself	
1988	Beetlejuice	Bernard	
1991	Year of the Gun	Ben Gershon	
1994	Forrest Gump	Himself	
1995	Apollo 13	Himself	
1996	Good Money	Doug	
1997	Elvis Meets Nixon	Narrator	
2000	Frequency	Himself	
2000	Behind the Seams	Detective	
2001	From The Ashes: The Life and Times of Tick Hall	Himself	
2005	Duane Hopwood	Fred	
2012	Excuse Me for Living	Reverend Pilatus	
2012	Driving Me Crazy	Mr. Johnson	
2014	River of Fundament	Wake Guest	

=== Television ===
Year	Title	Role	Notes
1959	The Phil Silvers Show	Student in Front Row	Episode: "Bilko's Godson"
1959	DuPont Show of the Month	Unknown	
1960	Playhouse 90	Unknown	Episode: "The Hiding Place"
1960–1984	The Tonight Show	Marlene Schmidt / Guest host	Also writer
1963	The Jerry Lewis Show	—N/a	Writer
1966–1967	What's My Line?	Occasional Guest Panelist	
1968–1986	The Dick Cavett Show	Himself (host)	
1971	The Most Deadly Game	Himself	Episode: "I, Said the Sparrow"
1972	Alias Smith and Jones	Sheriff	Episode: "21 Days to Tenstrike"
1974–1975	Feeling Good	Himself (host)	Children's Television Workshop, PBS
1975	The Odd Couple	Himself	Episode: "Two Men on a Hoarse"
1976	Saturday Night Live	Himself (host)	
1983	The Edge of Night	Moe Everhardt	
1983	Cheers	Himself	Episode: "They Called Me Mayday"
1984	Hotel	Himself	Episode: "Outsiders"
1986	Kate & Allie	Himself	Episode: "High Anxiety"
1987	Amazing Stories	Himself	Episode: "Mirror, Mirror"
1988	Another World	Oliver Twist (magician/hypnotist)	
1990	True Blue	Unknown	Episode: "Blue Monday"
1993	Barbarians at the Gate	Himself	Television film
1995	The Simpsons	Himself	Episode: "Homie the Clown"
2011	Bored to Death	Himself	Episode: "The Black Clock of Time"
2011	Woody Allen: A Documentary	Himself	Two part documentary, PBS
2012	Are We There Yet?	Harold Bradlee	Episode: "The Spelling Bee Episode"
2012	Gossip Girl	Himself	Episode: "Con Heir"
2014	Theatre Talk	Himself (Guest)	Episode: Dick Cavett (2014)
2016	Childrens Hospital	Himself	Episode: "Show Me a Hero"
2017	Full Frontal with Samantha Bee	Himself	May 31, 2017
2020	The Late Show with Stephen Colbert	Himself	Episode: "Patrick Stewart/Dick Cavett"

=== Theater ===
Year	Title	Role	Notes
1977	Otherwise Engaged	Simon	Broadway
1988	Into the Woods	The Narrator	Broadway
2000–02	The Rocky Horror Show	Narrator	Broadway

=== Bibliography ===
- Cavett by Dick Cavett and Christopher Porterfield, Bantam Books, August 1974. ISBN 0-15-116130-5.
- Eye on Cavett by Dick Cavett and Christopher Porterfield, Arbor House, 1983. ISBN 0-87795-463-1.
- Talk Show: Confrontations, Pointed Commentary, and Off-Screen Secrets by Dick Cavett, Times Books, 2010. ISBN 0-8050-9195-5.
- Brief Encounters: Conversations, Magic Moments, and Assorted Hijinks by Dick Cavett, Henry Holt and Co., 2014. ISBN 978-0-8050-9977-5.

Media offices
Preceded by Pat Sajak	College Bowl host 1987	Succeeded by Peyton Manning; 2021
