= Le Hohwald =

- Commune
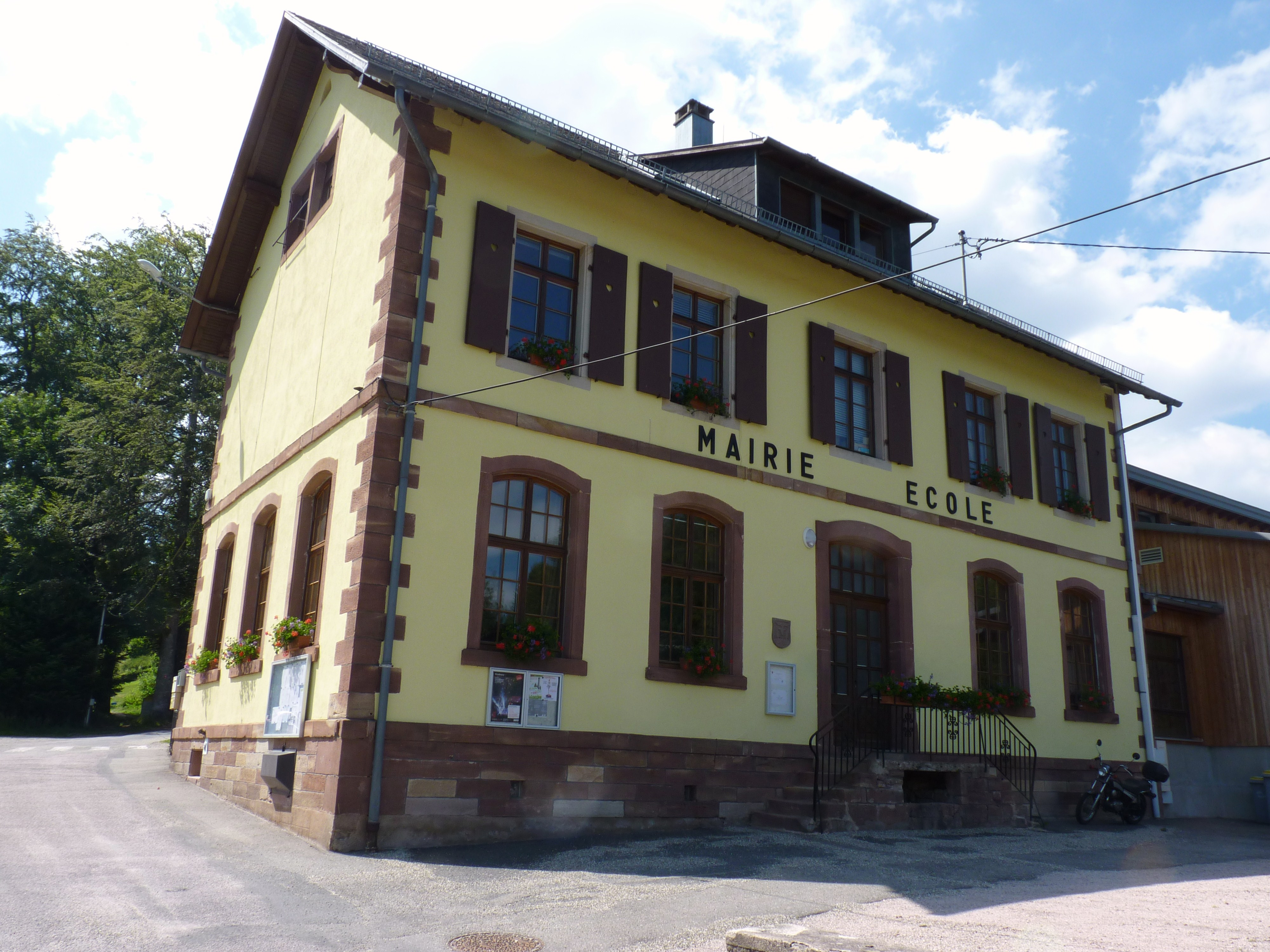
- The town hall in Le Hohwald

- Coat of arms
- Location of Le Hohwald
- Location within France Location within Grand Est
- Coordinates: 48°24′18″N 7°19′49″E
- Country: France
- Region: Grand Est
- Department: Bas-Rhin
- Arrondissement: Sélestat-Erstein
- Canton: Obernai

Government
  - Mayor (2020–2026): Patrick Conrad
- Area^{1}: 20.84 km^{2} (8.05 sq mi)
- Highest elevation: 1,091 m (3,579 ft)
- Lowest elevation: 450 m (1,480 ft)
- Population (2023): 521
  - Density: 25.0/km^{2} (64.7/sq mi)
- Time zone: UTC+01:00 (CET)
  - Summer (DST): UTC+02:00 (CEST)
- INSEE/Postal code: 67210 /67140
- ^{1} French Land Register data, which excludes lakes, ponds, glaciers > 1 km^{2} (0.386 sq mi or 247 acres) and river estuaries.

Le Hohwald (French pronunciation: [lə ovald]; German: Hohwald) is a commune in the Bas-Rhin department in Alsace in north-eastern France.

== Geography ==
=== Climate ===
Le Hohwald is a hill village, with altitude above sea level in the commune ranging from 450 meters to nearly 1100 meters, positioned some fifty kilometres to the west-south-west of Strasbourg and some ten kilometres to the south-west of Mont Sainte-Odile. Its position in the lee of mountains protects it from north winds and from many of the frequent fogs and mists that are a feature of the climate elsewhere in Alsace, and supports claims of an unexpectedly benign climate all the year round.

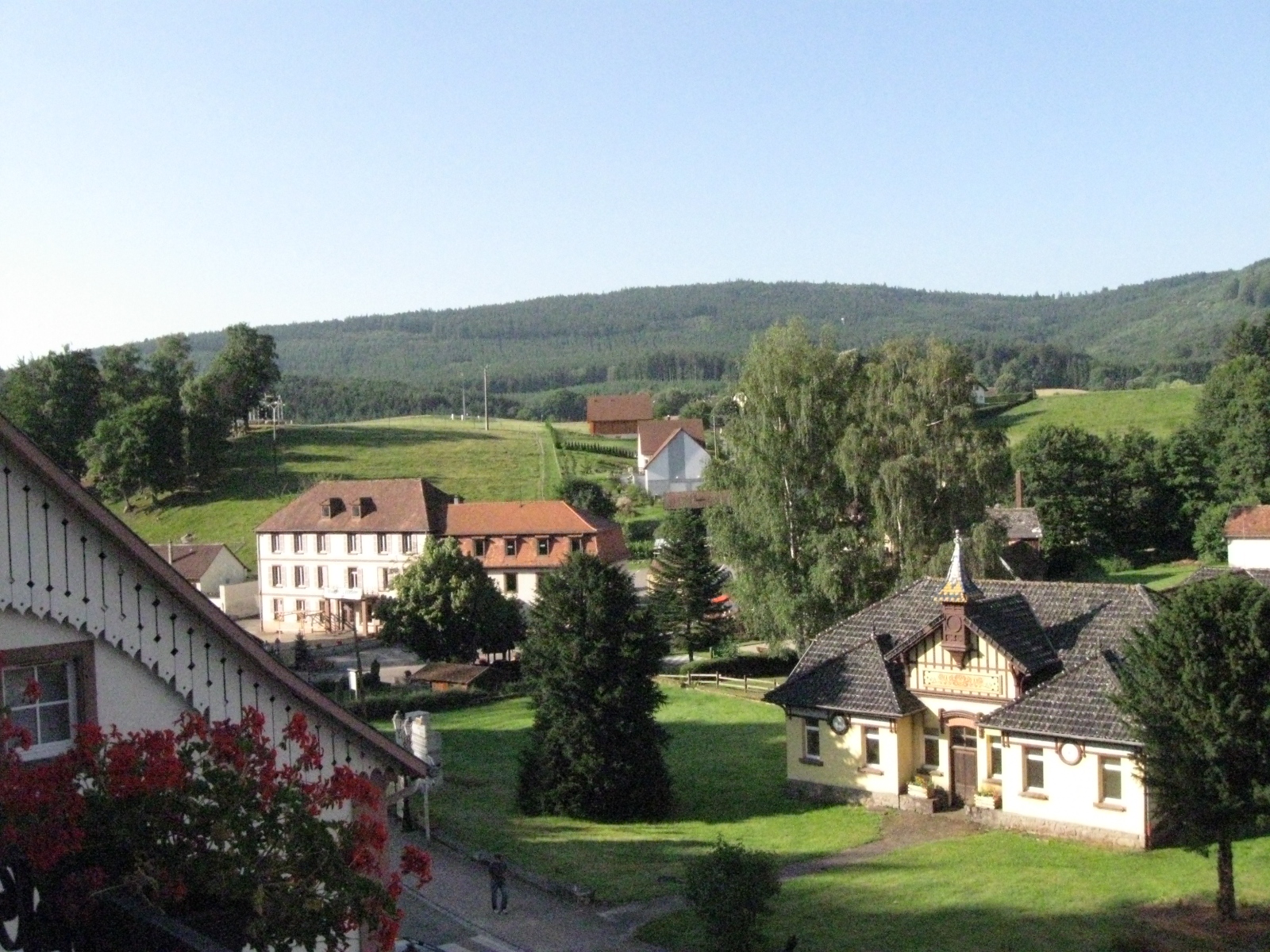
Le Hohwald view

On average, Le Hohwald experiences 93.7 days per year with a minimum temperature below 0 °C (32.0 °F), 5.5 days per year with a minimum temperature below −10 °C (14.0 °F), 19.3 days per year with a maximum temperature below 0 °C (32.0 °F), and 4.1 days per year with a maximum temperature above 30 °C (86.0 °F). The record high temperature was 35.6 °C (96.1 °F) on July 25, 2019, while the record low temperature was −20.5 °C (−4.9 °F) on February 7, 1991.

Climate data for Le Hohwald (1991–2020 normals, extremes 1990–present)
| Month | Jan | Feb | Mar | Apr | May | Jun | Jul | Aug | Sep | Oct | Nov | Dec | Year |
|---|---|---|---|---|---|---|---|---|---|---|---|---|---|
| Record high °C (°F) | 16.8 (62.2) | 19.5 (67.1) | 22.2 (72.0) | 26.7 (80.1) | 30.0 (86.0) | 34.1 (93.4) | 35.6 (96.1) | 34.8 (94.6) | 30.0 (86.0) | 25.6 (78.1) | 20.0 (68.0) | 17.4 (63.3) | 35.6 (96.1) |
| Mean daily maximum °C (°F) | 4.0 (39.2) | 4.9 (40.8) | 8.8 (47.8) | 13.1 (55.6) | 17.1 (62.8) | 20.8 (69.4) | 22.9 (73.2) | 22.7 (72.9) | 18.0 (64.4) | 13.2 (55.8) | 7.8 (46.0) | 4.7 (40.5) | 13.2 (55.7) |
| Daily mean °C (°F) | 1.0 (33.8) | 1.4 (34.5) | 4.6 (40.3) | 8.0 (46.4) | 11.9 (53.4) | 15.4 (59.7) | 17.3 (63.1) | 17.2 (63.0) | 13.2 (55.8) | 9.2 (48.6) | 4.6 (40.3) | 1.8 (35.2) | 8.8 (47.8) |
| Mean daily minimum °C (°F) | −2.0 (28.4) | −2.2 (28.0) | 0.3 (32.5) | 3.0 (37.4) | 6.8 (44.2) | 10.0 (50.0) | 11.7 (53.1) | 11.8 (53.2) | 8.5 (47.3) | 5.3 (41.5) | 1.3 (34.3) | −1.1 (30.0) | 4.4 (40.0) |
| Record low °C (°F) | −15.5 (4.1) | −20.5 (−4.9) | −18.1 (−0.6) | −8.6 (16.5) | −2.6 (27.3) | 0.5 (32.9) | 3.1 (37.6) | 2.6 (36.7) | 0.0 (32.0) | −6.2 (20.8) | −12.0 (10.4) | −20.2 (−4.4) | −20.5 (−4.9) |
| Average precipitation mm (inches) | 114.1 (4.49) | 95.7 (3.77) | 97.8 (3.85) | 70.4 (2.77) | 98.5 (3.88) | 82.9 (3.26) | 80.0 (3.15) | 77.7 (3.06) | 75.4 (2.97) | 104.5 (4.11) | 102.5 (4.04) | 129.6 (5.10) | 1,129.1 (44.45) |
| Average precipitation days (≥ 1.0 mm) | 12.9 | 11.5 | 11.1 | 10.8 | 12.7 | 11.2 | 11.6 | 10.9 | 10.0 | 12.0 | 12.7 | 14.6 | 142.0 |
Source: Meteociel

=== Economy ===
The tourist business is important to the local economy with more than 120 km of marked paths for walkers in the surrounding forests, other sport and recreational activities advertised including fishing and skiing, and numerous hotels, pensions and restaurants in and around the village.

== Visitor attractions ==
The arboretum started as an experimental plantation of Douglas Fir established in 1885. Today the range of trees is more remarkable, including a rare sequoia discovered in 1960 and a snake-tailed spruce.

Visitors to the village will also encounter an unusual range of art works, including 17 sculptures representing animals and philosophical concepts.

At the upper exit to the village a fountain dedicated to the fate of Haïdi Hautval, supported by an inscription in no fewer than eleven languages, recalls a locally famous figure from history.

== History ==
Le Hohwald, which is still a young commune, owes its birth to a decree of the court of Colmar of 16 April 1867. It groups together various hamlets which were administratively part of five communes: Breitenbach, Erlenbach, Barr, Andlau and Ottrott and were grouped together in a single entity comprising about 500 inhabitants at its birth. Towards the end of the Middle Ages, the territory was shared by three co-owners: the bishop of Strasbourg with the lords of the Val de Villé in co-ownership, the lordship of Barr and the abbey of Andlau.

The first inhabitants of Hohwald seem to have settled after the Thirty Years' War. The town of Strasbourg, which owned the land, encouraged immigrants from Switzerland (mostly Anabaptists) to settle in the area. They usually settled in the stubble fields to raise livestock and clear the land. They gradually built farms and sawmills to exploit the wood, which later became hamlets. However, the area did not really develop until the middle of the 17th century.

From the 19th century onwards, Le Howald emerged from its isolation thanks to the construction of roads and a railway. A health resort was established and many prominent people from all over Europe came to the town at the beginning of the 20th century.

Throughout the 19th century, the Hohwald was known as a world-renowned tourist resort. A few rich people from Strasbourg set up their second homes here and some farms were converted into guesthouses or hotels.

Important personalities from the political or artistic world, such as Sarah Bernhardt (1844-1923), the actor Benoît Constant Coquelin, known as Coquelin aîné (1841-1909), Marshal Joffre (1852-1931), Chancellor Konrad Adenauer (1876-1967) and Queen Juliana of the Netherlands (1909-2004) made the Hohwald their holiday resort during the summer. Émile Mathis (1880-1956), the manufacturer of Mathis cars in the inter-war period (factories in La Meinau, a south-western district of Strasbourg), built the Mathis villa, typical of the Art Deco style of the thirties - due to the architect Armand-Albert Rateau - in which he came to recharge his batteries and where he welcomed the political and industrial personalities of the time.

The Hohwald is covered by a vast expanse of forest, about 9/10ths of which belongs to the town of Strasbourg.

== See also ==
- Communes of the Bas-Rhin department
