= Tick Hall =

Historic house in Montauk, New York, USA

Coordinates: 41°2′37.2″N 71°54′5.8″W

Tick Hall was a historic house in Montauk, New York, originally built by Stanford White. It burned down in 1997, with only the chimney left standing, and was rebuilt by its owner, Dick Cavett. It was reconstructed without written plans or formal architectural photos.

The house was built by Alexander Ector Orr, who passed it on to his friend Harrison Tweed, who in turn sold it to Cavett. Scott Morris directed From The Ashes: The Life and Times of Tick Hall, a documentary film about the rebuilding that aired in 2003. Tick Hall was one of a group of seven houses the architectural firm McKim, Mead & White designed in 1879. The entire district was added to the National Register of Historic Places in 1976.
