= QB VII (miniseries) =

1974 American TV miniseries

- Created by: Leon Uris
- Written by: Edward Anhalt, Wilford Lloyd Baumes, Leon Uris
- Starring: Ben Gazzara; Anthony Hopkins; Leslie Caron; Lee Remick
- Composer: Jerry Goldsmith
- Country of origin: United States
- No. of episodes: 2

Production
- Executive producer: Douglas S. Cramer
- Running time: 390 minutes
- Production companies: The Douglas S. Cramer Company; Screen Gems

Original release
- Network: ABC
- Release: April 29 – April 30, 1974

QB VII is an American television miniseries produced by Screen Gems; it was also the final program from Columbia Pictures's television division to be made under the Screen Gems banner. It began airing on ABC on April 29, 1974. Adapted for the screen by Edward Anhalt from the 1970 novel QB VII by Leon Uris, it was produced by Douglas S. Cramer and directed by Tom Gries. The original music was written by Jerry Goldsmith and the cinematography by Paul Beeson and Robert L. Morrison.

The six-and-a-half-hour miniseries won seven of the fourteen Primetime Emmy Awards for which it was nominated.

== Plot ==
Adam Kelno, a Polish doctor, escapes from a Nazi concentration camp. During his recovery, he romances his nurse, Angela, and eventually marries her and settles in England.

After the end of World War II, the communist authorities of Poland try to extradite Kelno for war crimes committed while working for the Nazis, where he allegedly performed medical experiments on Jewish prisoners. They fail to prove their case and Kelno is vindicated, but afterwards he takes his wife to Kuwait to escape the notoriety. His efforts to bring modern medicine and vaccinate the children of the region earns him recognition and a knighthood. He returns to England to set up a practice in one of the poorest London neighborhoods.

During World War II, Abraham Cady, an American writer serving in the Royal Air Force, is wounded. He also marries his nurse, Samantha. They move to California, where Cady becomes an Oscar-winning screenwriter, and raise their son. Cady's father, an Orthodox Jew, lives with them, sharing his faith with his intrigued grandson, much to the ire of the atheistic Cady. When their son becomes of age, Cady and Samantha move to London; his father moves to Israel. Cady's philandering and his growing distance from his wife leads to their divorce. He takes up with Lady Margaret, an American-born aristocrat. Cady reconnects with his Jewish heritage while in Israel to see his ill father, who dies shortly after his arrival.

Cady remains in Israel to write a book, called The Holocaust. He names Kelno as a Nazi collaborator who performed forced sterilizations on Jewish prisoners. Kelno brings a lawsuit for libel against Cady, which is heard in the London courts.

Kelno insists on his innocence. Cady is defiant when confronted by Kelno and reporters outside the courtroom. In court, Kelno denies sterilizing healthy Jews at the behest of the SS, but Cady's barrister presents evidence that Kelno castrated hundreds of healthy Jews as punishments or as medical experiments, and that some of them died as a result.

Kelno is devastated when his son, a medical intern, turns on him and throws him out. Cady, too, loses his son, who dies while serving in the Israeli Air Force.

The jury finds in favor of Kelno but only rewards him one half-penny, "the lowest coin in the realm," for damages to Kelno's reputation.

== Cast ==
Starring

- Ben Gazzara as Abraham Cady

Co-starring

- Anthony Hopkins as Dr. Adam Kelno
- Leslie Caron as Angela Kelno

Special guest stars

- Juliet Mills as Samantha Cady
- Dan O'Herlihy as David Shawcross
- Robert Stephens as Robert Highsmith
- Anthony Quayle as Tom Bannister
- Milo O'Shea as Dr. Stanislaus Lotaki
- John Gielgud as Clinton-Meek
- Edith Evans as Dr. Parmentier
- Jack Hawkins as Justice Gilray

Guest stars

- Judy Carne as Natalie
- Kris Tabori as Ben Cady
- Joseph Wiseman as Morris Cady
- Lee Remick as Lady Margaret Alexander Wydman
- Anthony Andrews as Stephen Kelno
- Signe Hasso as Lena Kronska
- Sam Jaffe as Dr. Mark Tessler
- Alan Napier as Semple

== DVD releases ==
QB VII was released as a Region 1 DVD on May 29, 2001.

== See also ==
- List of Holocaust films
