= James B. Nies =

American episcopal minister (1856–1922)

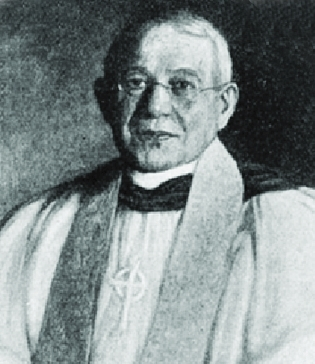
James B. Nies

James Buchanan Nies (22 November 1856 - 1922) was an American episcopal minister and Assyriologist. He graduated Columbia College, Columbia University in 1882 where he was a member of the Philolexian Society, the college's literary and debate society. He was president of the American Oriental Society in 1921.

== Selected publications ==
=== Articles ===
- "Notes on a Cross Jordan Trip Made October 23rd to November 7th, 1899", Palestine Exploration Quarterly, Vol. 33 (1901), No. 4, pp. 362–368.
- "The Opportunity of the American School of Archaeology in Palestine", Journal of Biblical Literature, Vol. 20, No. 1 (1901), pp. 31–37.
- "The Boomerang in Ancient Babylonia", American Anthropologist, New Series, Vol. 16, No. 1 (January–March 1914), pp. 26–32.
- "A Net Cylinder of Entemena", Journal of the American Oriental Society, Vol. 36 (1916), pp. 137–139.

=== Books ===
- Historical, Religious and Economic Texts and Antiquities. Yale University Press, New Haven, 1920. (With Clarence E. Keiser)
- Ur Dynasty Tablets. Texts chiefly from Tello and Drehem written during the reigns of Dungi, Bur-Sin, Gimil-Sin, and Ibi-Sin &c. J.C. Hinrichs, Leipzig, 1920.
